= List of songs recorded by Celine Dion =

Songs by Canadian singer

Songs recorded by Celine Dion
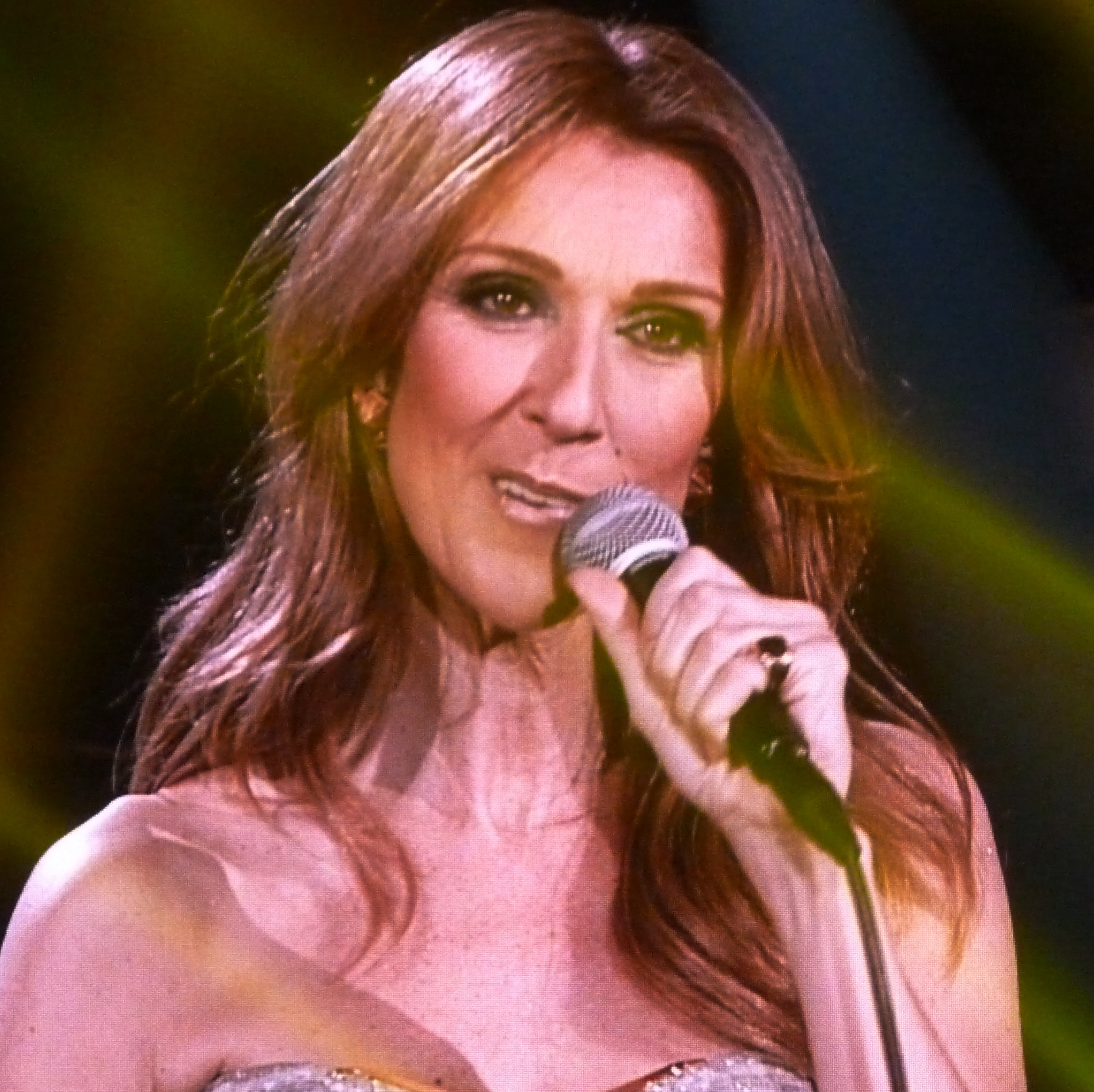
- Dion in 2013
- Released songs: 476
- Unreleased songs: 97

Canadian singer Celine Dion has recorded songs for 27 studio albums, including three Christmas albums, as well as eight greatest hits.

== A ==
- "À cause" (D'elles, 2007)
- "À la plus haute branche" (Encore un soir, 2016)
- "A Mother's Prayer" (Miracle, 2004)
- "A New Day Has Come" (A New Day Has Come, 2002)
- "A New Day Has Come" (Radio Remix) (A New Day Has Come, 2002)
- "À Paris" (500 choristes avec...., 2005)
- "À quatre pas d'ici" (Du soleil au cœur, 1983)
- "A Song for You" (Taking Chances, 2007)
- "À vous" (Encore un soir, 2016)
- "A World to Believe In" (Taking Chances, 2007)
- "A World to Believe In" (U.S.A. Mix) (featuring Yuna Ito) (Complete Best, 2008)
- "A World to Believe In: Himiko Fantasia" (A World to Believe In, 2008)
- "Adeste Fideles (O Come All Ye Faithful)" (These Are Special Times, 1998)
- "Ain't Gonna Look the Other Way" (A New Day... Live in Las Vegas, 2004)
- "All Because of You" (A New Day Has Come 2002 Limited Edition Bonus Track, 2002)
- "All by Myself" (Falling into You, 1996)
- "All the Way" (featuring Frank Sinatra) (All the Way... A Decade of Song, 1999)
- "Alone" (Taking Chances, 2007)
- "Always Be Your Girl" (Loved Me Back to Life, 2013)
- "Amar Haciendo el Amor" (Let's Talk About Love bonus track, 1997)
- "Ammore Annascunnuto" (Live) (Ultimate Box, 2008)
- "Amoureuse" (C'est pour toi, 1985)
- "Another Year Has Gone By" (These Are Special Times, 1998)
- "Apprends-moi" (1 fille & 4 types, 2003)
- "Ashes" (Deadpool 2 (Original Motion Picture Soundtrack), 2018)
- "At Last" (A New Day Has Come, 2002)
- "At Last" (Live) (A New Day... Live in Las Vegas, 2004)
- "At Seventeen" (Loved Me Back to Life, 2013)
- "Attendre" (Sans attendre, 2012)
- "Au secours" (La voix du bon Dieu, 1981)
- "Aún Existe Amor" (A New Day Has Come, 2002)
- "Autour de moi" (La voix du bon Dieu, 1981)
- "Ave Maria" (These Are Special Times, 1998)
- "Avec toi" (C'est pour toi, 1985)

== B ==
- "Baby" (Courage, 2019)
- "Baby Close Your Eyes" (Miracle, 2004)
- "Be the Man" (Let's Talk About Love bonus track, 1997)
- "Be the Man" (Karaoke Version) (Let's Talk About Love bonus track, 1997)
- "Be the Man (On This Night)" (The Collector's Series, Volume One, 2000)
- "Beautiful Boy" (Miracle, 2004)
- "Beauty and the Beast" (featuring Peabo Bryson) (Celine Dion, 1992)
- "Beauty and the Beast" (featuring Maurice Davis) (For Our Children: The Concert, 1992)
- "Because You Loved Me" (Falling into You, 1996)
- "Because You Loved Me" (Live) (A New Day... Live in Las Vegas, 2004)
- "Benjamin" (Du soleil au cœur, 1983)
- "Berceuse" (D'elles, 2007)
- "Best of All" (Courage, 2019)
- "Bewitched" (Mona Lisa Smile soundtrack, 2003)
- "Billy" (The Best of Celine Dion, 1988)
- "Blue Christmas" (These Are Special Times, 1998)
- "Boundaries" (Courage, 2019)
- "Brahms' Lullaby" (For Our Children Too!, 1996)
- "Brahms' Lullaby" (These Are Special Times, 1998)
- "Breakaway" (Loved Me Back to Life, 2013)

== C ==
- "Call the Man" (Falling into You, 1996)
- "Calling You" (Live) (À l'Olympia, 1994)
- "Can't Fight the Feelin'" (Taking Chances, 2007)
- "Can't Help Falling In Love" (VH1 Divas Las Vegas, 2002)
- "Can't Live With You, Can't Live Without You" (featuring Billy Newton-Davis) (Spellbound, 1989)
- "Ce n'était qu'un rêve" (La voix du bon Dieu, 1981)
- "Céline et Pinotte" (Chants et contes de Noël, 1983)
- "Celle qui m'a tout appris" (Sans attendre, 2012)
- "C'est pour toi" (C'est pour toi, 1985)
- "C'est pour vivre" (The Best of Celine Dion, 1988)
- "C'est pour vivre" (with the V'là l'bon vent choir) (C'est pour toi, 1985)
- "Change My Mind" (Courage, 2019)
- "Chante-moi" (Mélanie, 1984)
- "Cherche encore" (D'eux, 1995)
- "Christmas Eve" (These Are Special Times, 1998)
- "Come to Me" (Miracle, 2004)
- "Come Together Now" (as part of the Come Together Now Collaborative) (2005)
- "Comme on disait avant" (Mélanie, 1984)
- "Comme un cœur froid" (Incognito, 1988)
- "Comment t′aimer" (B-side to "Je ne veux pas", 1987)
- "Contre nature" (1 fille & 4 types, 2003)
- "Coulda Woulda Shoulda" (One Heart, 2003)
- "Courage" (Courage, 2019)
- "Cry Just a Little" (B-side to "Love Can Move Mountains" single, 1992)

== D ==
- "D'abord, c'est quoi l'amour" (Incognito, 1988)
- "D'amour ou d'amitié" (Tellement j'ai d'amour..., 1982)
- "D'amour ou d'amitié" (Live) (Céline Dion en concert, 1985)
- "Dance with My Father" (So Amazing: An All-Star Tribute to Luther Vandross, 2005 & My Love: Ultimate Essential Collection, 2008)
- "Dans un autre monde" (S'il suffisait d'aimer, 1998)
- "Dans un autre monde" (Live) (Au cœur du stade, 1999)
- "Declaration of Love" (Falling into You, 1996)
- "Délivre-moi" (Incognito, 1988)
- "Des milliers de baisers" (1 fille & 4 types, 2003)
- "Des mots qui sonnent" (Dion chante Plamondon, 1991)
- "Des mots qui sonnent" (Live) (À l'Olympia, 1994)
- "Destin" (D'eux, 1995)
- "Destin" (Live) (Live à Paris, 1996)
- "Did You Give Enough Love" (Celine Dion, 1992)
- "Didn't Know Love" (Loved Me Back to Life, 2013)
- "Dis-moi si je t'aime" (C'est pour toi, 1985)
- "Do You Hear What I Hear" (featuring Rosie O'Donnell) (These Are Special Times - Collector's Edition DVD, 1998)
- "Don't Save It All for Christmas Day" (These Are Special Times, 1998)
- "Dreamin' of You" (Falling into You, 1996)
- "Du soleil au cœur" (Les chemins de ma maison, 1983)

== E ==
- "Écoutez-moi" (Tellement j'ai d'amour..., 1982)
- "Elle" (C'est pour toi, 1985)
- "Elle" (Live) (À l'Olympia, 1994)
- "Elvis Medley Finale" (with Anastacia, Shakira and Cher) (VH1 Divas Las Vegas, 2002)
- "En amour" (Les premières années, 1994)
- "En attendant ses pas" (S'il suffisait d'aimer, 1998)
- "Et je t'aime encore" (1 fille & 4 types, 2003)
- "Et je t'aime encore" (Live) (A New Day... Live in Las Vegas, 2004)
- "Et puis un jour" (Les chemins de ma maison, 1983)
- "Et s'il n'en restait qu'une (je serais celle-là)" (D'elles, 2007)
- "Everybody's Talkin' My Baby Down" (The Colour of My Love, 1993)
- "Everybody's Talkin' My Baby Down" (Live) (Falling into You bonus track, 1996)
- "Eyes on Me" (Taking Chances, 2007)

== F ==
- "Fade Away" (Taking Chances, 2007)
- "Fais ce que tu voudras" (Les chansons en or, 1986)
- "Faith" (One Heart, 2003)
- "Falling in Love Again" (Courage, 2019)
- "Falling into You" (Falling into You, 1996)
- "Félix Leclerc Medley : Bozo / Le p'tit bonheur / Moi, mes souliers / Attends-moi 'ti-gars / Le train du nord" (Live) (Céline Dion en concert, 1985)
- "Feliz Navidad" (These Are Special Times, 1998)
- "Femme comme chacune" (D'elles, 2007)
- "Fever" (Live) (A New Day... Live in Las Vegas, 2004)
- "Fly" (Falling into You, 1996)
- "Flying on My Own" (Courage, 2019)
- "For the Lover That I Lost" (Courage, 2019)
- "Forget Me Not" (One Heart, 2003)

== G ==
- "Glory Alleluia" (Céline Dion chante Noël, 1981)
- "God Bless America" (God Bless America, 2001)
- "Goodbye's (The Saddest Word)" (A New Day Has Come, 2002)
- "Grand-maman" (La voix du bon Dieu, 1981)
- "Greatest Love of All" (Tribute to Whitney Houston (Grammy Awards), 2012)

== H ==
- "Halfway to Heaven" (Celine Dion, 1992)
- "Hand in Hand" (German version of "Ne partez pas sans moi," released as a single in 1988)
- "Happy to Meet You" (with Herry Monster, Elmo and Big Bird) (Elmopalooza! soundtrack, 1998)
- "Happy Xmas (War Is Over)" (These Are Special Times, 1998)
- "Have a Heart" (Unison, 1990)
- "Have You Ever Been in Love" (A New Day Has Come, 2002)
- "Heart of Glass" (Courage, 2019)
- "Hello Mister Sam" (Les chemins de ma maison, 1983)
- "Here, There And Everywhere" (In My Life, 1998)
- "How Did You Get Here" (Courage, 2019)
- "How Do You Keep the Music Playing" (Loved Me Back to Life, 2013)
- "How Does a Moment Last Forever" (Beauty and the Beast soundtrack, 2017)
- "Hymn" (Snowtime! soundtrack, 2016)
- "Hymne à l'amitié" (Les oiseaux du bonheur, 1984)

== I ==
- "I Believe in You (Je crois en toi)" (with Il Divo) (On ne change pas, 2005)
- "I Don't Know" (Falling into You, 1996)
- "I Drove All Night" (One Heart, 2003)
- "I Drove All Night" (Live) (A New Day... Live in Las Vegas, 2004)
- "I Drove All Night" (Hex Hector Extended Vocal Import Mix) (My Love: Ultimate Essential Collection bonus track, 2008)
- "I Feel Too Much" (Unison, 1990)
- "I Got Nothin' Left'" (Taking Chances, 2007)
- "I Hate You Then I Love You" (featuring Luciano Pavarotti) (Let's Talk About Love, 1997)
- "I Have to Dream" (Children on Their Birthdays soundtrack, 2002)
- "I Knew I Loved You" (We All Love Ennio Morricone, 2007 & My Love: Ultimate Essential Collection, 2008)
- "I Know What Love Is" (One Heart, 2003)
- "I Love You" (Falling into You, 1996)
- "I Love You, Goodbye" (Celine Dion, 1992)
- "I Met an Angel (On Christmas Day)" (B-side of "That's The Way It Is" single, 1999)
- "I Remember L.A." (The Colour of My Love, 1993)
- "I Surrender" (A New Day Has Come, 2002)
- "I Want You to Need Me" (All the Way... A Decade of Song, 1999)
- "I Want You to Need Me" (Thunderpuss Radio Mix) (My Love: Ultimate Essential Collection bonus track, 2008)
- "I Will Be Stronger" (Courage, 2019)
- "If I Can Dream" (with Elvis Presley (American Idol), 2007 & (The Best of Celine Dion & David Foster), 2012)
- "If I Could" (Miracle, 2004)
- "If I Could" (Live) (A New Day... Live in Las Vegas, 2004)
- "If I Ruled The World" (with Tony Bennett) (Duets: An American Classic, 2006)
- "If I Were You" (Celine Dion, 1992)
- "If Love Is Out of the Question" (Unison, 1990)
- "If That's What It Takes" (Falling into You, 1996)
- "(If There Was) Any Other Way" (Unison, 1990)
- "If Walls Could Talk" (All the Way... A Decade of Song, 1999)
- "If We Could Start Over" (Unison, 1990)
- "If You Asked Me To" (Celine Dion, 1992)
- "If You Asked Me To" (Live) (Falling into You bonus track, 1996)
- "If You Could See Me Now" (Celine Dion, 1992)
- "I'll Be" (Love Again Soundtrack, 2023)
- "I'm Alive" (A New Day Has Come, 2002)
- "I'm Alive" (Live) (A New Day... Live in Las Vegas, 2004)
- "I'm Loving Every Moment with You" (Unison, 1990)
- "I'm Your Angel" (featuring R. Kelly) (These Are Special Times, 1998)
- "Immensité" (D'elles, 2007)
- "Immortality" (Let's Talk About Love, 1997)
- "Imperfections" (Courage, 2019)
- "In His Touch" (One Heart, 2003)
- "In Some Small Way" (Miracle, 2004)
- "Incognito" (Incognito, 1987)
- "Incredible" (featuring Ne-Yo) (Loved Me Back to Life, 2013)
- "Introduction" (Celine Dion, 1992)
- "It's a Man's Man's Man's World" (Live) (Taking Chances World Tour: The Concert, 2010)
- "It's All Coming Back to Me Now" (Falling into You, 1996)
- "It's All Coming Back to Me Now" (Classic Paradise Mix) (Falling into You bonus track, 1996)
- "It's All Coming Back to Me Now" (Radio Edit) (All the Way... A Decade of Song, 1999)
- "It's All Coming Back to Me Now" (Live) (A New Day... Live in Las Vegas, 2004)
- "It's Hard to Say Goodbye" (featuring Paul Anka) (A Body of Work, 1998) / (Different version: Duets, 2013)
- "I've Got the World on a String" (Live) (A New Day... Live in Las Vegas, 2004)
- "I Wish" (Live) (A New Day... Live in Las Vegas, 2004)

== J ==
- "J'ai besoin d'un chum" (Dion chante Plamondon, 1991)
- "J'ai vu maman embrasser le Père Noël" (Céline Dion chante Noël, 1981)
- "J'attendais" (D'eux, 1995)
- "J'attendais" (Live) (Live à Paris, 1996)
- "Je chanterai" (S'il suffisait d'aimer, 1998)
- "Je cherche l'ombre" (D'elles, 2007)
- "Je crois toi" (S'il suffisait d'aimer, 1998)
- "Je crois toi" (Live) (Au cœur du stade, 1999)
- "Je danse dans ma tête" (Dion chante Plamondon, 1991)
- "Je danse dans ma tête" (Live) (À l'Olympia, 1994)
- "Je lui dirai" (1 fille & 4 types, 2003)
- "Je n'ai pas besoin d'amour" (Sans attendre, 2012)
- "Je ne suis pas celle" (D'elles, 2007)
- "Je ne veux pas" (The Best of Celine Dion, 1988)
- "Je ne vous oublie pas" (On ne change pas, 2005)
- "Je nous veux" (Encore un soir, 2016)
- "Je sais pas" (D'eux, 1995)
- "Je sais pas" (Live) (Live à Paris, 1996)
- "Je sais pas" (Live) (Au cœur du stade, 1999)
- "Je t'aime encore" (One Heart, 2003)
- "J'irai où tu iras" (D'eux, 1995)
- "J'irai où tu iras" (Live) (duet with Jean-Jacques Goldman) (Live à Paris, 1996)
- "J'irai où tu iras" (Live) (duet with Jean-Jacques Goldman) (Au cœur du stade, 1999)
- "J'irai où tu iras" (Demo Version) (featuring Jean-Jacques Goldman) (D'eux 15th Anniversary Edition bonus track, 2010)
- "Jours de fièvre" (Incognito, 1988)
- "Joyeux Noël" (Céline Dion chante Noël, 1981)
- "Just a Little Bit of Love" (Let's Talk About Love, 1997)
- "Just Walk Away" (The Colour of My Love bonus track, 1993)

== L ==
- "La diva" (D'elles, 2007)
- "La do do la do" (Les chemins de ma maison, 1983)
- "La mémoire d'Abraham" (D'eux, 1995)
- "La mer et l'enfant" (Sans attendre, 2012)
- "La première fois (Arc-en-ciel)" (Live) (Céline Dion en concert, 1985)
- "La première fois (Finale)" (Live) (Céline Dion en concert, 1985)
- "La religieuse" (single, 1988)
- "La voix du bon Dieux" (La voix du bon Dieu, 1981)
- "L'abandon" (S'il suffisait d'aimer, 1998)
- "Là-bas" (featuring Jean-Jacques Goldman) (Les Enfoirés au Grand Rex, 1994)
- "L'amour est enfant de bohême" (Live) (Céline Dion en concert, 1985)
- "L'amour existe encore" (Dion chante Plamondon, 1991)
- "L'amour existe encore" (Live) (À l'Olympia, 1994)
- "L'amour peut prendre froid" (featuring Johnny Hallyday) (Sans attendre, 2012)
- "L'amour viendra" (La voix du bon Dieu, 1981)
- "Le ballet" (D'eux, 1995)
- "Le ballet" (Live) (Live à Paris, 1996)
- "Le ballet" (Demo Version) (D'eux 15th Anniversary Edition bonus track, 2010)
- "Le blues du businessman" (Dion chante Plamondon, 1991)
- "Le blues du businessman" (Live) (À l'Olympia, 1994)
- "Le bonheur en face" (Encore un soir, 2016)
- "Le conte de Karine" (Chants et contes de Noël, 1983)
- "Le fils de Superman" (Dion chante Plamondon, 1991)
- "Le fils de Superman" (Live) (À l'Olympia, 1994)
- "Le loup, la biche et le chevalier (Une chanson douce)" (Miracle, 2004)
- "Le piano fantôme" (Tellement j'ai d'amour..., 1982)
- "Le p'tit renne au nez rouge" (Céline Dion chante Noël, 1981)
- "Le miracle" (Sans attendre, 2012)
- "Le monde est stone" (Dion chante Plamondon, 1991)
- "Le temps qui compte" (D'elles, 2007)
- "Le tour du monde" (with the Dion sisters) (Tellement j'ai d'amour..., 1982)
- "Le vieux monsieur de la rue Royale" (Tellement j'ai d'amour..., 1982)
- "Le vol d'un ange" (1 fille & 4 types, 2003)
- "Les chansons d'amour" (Medley) (La Soirée des Enfoirés 96, 1996)
- "Les chemins de ma maison" (Les chemins de ma maison, 1983)
- "Les cloches du hameau" (These Are Special Times, 1998)
- "Les derniers seront les premiers" (D'eux, 1995)
- "Les derniers seront les premiers" (Live) (Live à Paris, 1996)
- "Les enfants oubliés" (Céline Dion chante Noël, 1981)
- "Les jours comme ça" (Sans attendre, 2012)
- "Les oiseaux du bonheur" (Les oiseaux du bonheur, 1984)
- "Les paradis" (D'elles, 2007)
- "Les petits pieds de Léa" (Sans attendre, 2012)
- "Les roses blanches" (La voix du bon Dieu, 1981)
- "Les uns contre les autres" (Dion chante Plamondon, 1991)
- "Les yeux au ciel" (Encore un soir, 2016)
- "Let Your Heart Decide" ("Tous les secrets" single, 2006 and Astérix & les Vikings soundtrack, 2006)
- "L'étoile" (Encore un soir, 2016)
- "Let's Talk About Love" (Let's Talk About Love, 1997)
- "Let's Talk About Love" (Live) (Au cœur du stade, 1999)
- "Lettre de George Sand à Alfred de Musset" (D'elles, 2007)
- "L'hymne" (with Fred Pellerin, La guerre des tuques 3D soundtrack, 2015)
- "Little Bit of Love" (Celine Dion, 1992)
- "Live for the One I Love" (All the Way... A Decade of Song, 1999)
- "Lolita (Trop jeune pour aimer)" (Incognito, 1987)
- "Look at Us Now" (Courage, 2019)
- "Love Again" (Love Again soundtrack, 2023)
- "Love by Another Name" (Unison, 1990)
- "Love Can Move Mountains" (Celine Dion, 1992)
- "Love Can Move Mountains" (Live) (À l'Olympia, 1994)
- "Love Can Move Mountains" (Live) (Falling into You bonus track, 1996)
- "Love Can Move Mountains" (Live) (Let's Talk About Love bonus track, 1997)
- "Love Can Move Mountains" (Other version on Touched By an Angel: The Album, 1998)
- "Love Can Move Mountains" (Radio Edit) (All the Way... A Decade of Song, 1999)
- "Love Doesn't Ask Why" (The Colour of My Love, 1993)
- "Love Is All We Need" (One Heart, 2003)
- "Love Is on the Way" (Let's Talk About Love, 1997)
- "Love Lights the World" (With David Foster featuring Peabo Bryson and Color Me Badd) (Love Lights the World, 1994)
- "Love of My Life" (Love Again soundtrack, 2023)
- "Love You Blind" (B-side of "If You Asked Me To " single, 1992)
- "Loved Me Back to Life" (Loved Me Back to Life, 2013)
- "Lovers Never Die" (Courage, 2019)
- "Lovin' Proof" (The Colour of My Love, 1993)
- "Lullabye (Goodnight, My Angel)" (Loved Me Back to Life, 2013)
- "Lying Down" (Courage, 2019)

== M ==
- "Ma chambre" (Incognito, 1988 French edition)
- "Ma faille" (Encore un soir,2016)
- "Ma force" (Encore un soir, 2016)
- "Ma Nouvelle-France" (Ma Nouvelle-France soundtrack, 2004)
- "Make You Happy" (Falling into You, 1996)
- "Mamy Blue" (Les chemins de ma maison, 1983)
- "Map to My Heart" (Taking Chances bonus track, 2007)
- "Medley acoustique : Ce n'était qu'un rêve / D'amour ou d'amitié / Mon ami m'a quittée / L'amour existe encore / Un garçon pas comme les autres (Ziggy)" (Au cœur du stade, 1999)
- "Medley Starmania : Quand on arrive en ville / Les uns contre les autres / Le monde est stone / Naziland, ce soir on danse" (Live) (À l'Olympia, 1994)
- "Mejor Decir Adiós" (duet with Paul Anka) (Amigos, 1996)
- "Mélanie" (Mélanie, 1984)
- "Michel Legrand Medley: Quand on s'aime / Brûle pas tes doigts / La valse du lilas / Quand ça balance / Les moulins de mon cœur" (Live) (Céline Dion en concert, 1985)
- "Miles to Go (Before I Sleep)" (Let's Talk About Love, 1997)
- "Miracle" (Miracle, 2004)
- "Misled" (The Colour of My Love, 1993)
- "Misled" (MK's History Remix) (My Love: Ultimate Essential Collection bonus track, 2008)
- "Moi quand je pleure" (Sans attendre, 2012)
- "Mon ami m'a quittée" (Les chemins de ma maison, 1983)
- "Mon ami m'a quittée" (Live) (Céline Dion en concert, 1985)
- "Mon homme" (1 fille & 4 types, 2003)
- "Mon rêve de toujours" (Mélanie, 1984)
- "My Heart Will Go On" (Let's Talk About Love, 1997)
- "My Heart Will Go On" (No lead vocals) (These Are Special Times bonus track, 1998)
- "My Heart Will Go On" (Richie Jones Mix) (Let's Talk About Love bonus track, 1997)
- "My Heart Will Go On" (Live) (Au cœur du stade, 1999)
- "My Heart Will Go On" (Live) (A New Day... Live in Las Vegas, 2004)
- "My Heart Will Go On" (Tony Moran's Anthem Vocal Mix) (My Love: Ultimate Essential Collection bonus track, 2008)
- "My Love" (Taking Chances, 2007)
- "My Love" (Live) (My Love: Essential Collection, 2008)
- "My Precious One" (Miracle, 2004)

== N ==
- "Nadie lo entiende" (with Café Quijano) (¡Qué grande es esto del amor!, 2003)
- "Naked" (One Heart, 2003)
- "Nature Boy" (A New Day Has Come, 2002)
- "Nature Boy" (Live) (A New Day... Live in Las Vegas, 2004)
- "Ne bouge pas" (1 fille & 4 types, 2003)
- "Ne me plaignez pas" (Les chemins de ma maison, 1983)
- "Ne me quitte pas" (Sans attendre, 2012)
- "Ne partez pas sans moi" (Incognito, 1987)
- "New Dawn" (Taking Chances, 2007)
- "Next Plane Out" (The Colour of My Love, 1993)
- "No Living Without Loving You" (The Colour of My Love, 1993)
- "Nobody's Watching" (Courage, 2019)
- "Noël blanc" (Céline Dion chante Noël, 1981)
- "Nothing Broken but My Heart" (Celine Dion, 1992)

== O ==
- "O Holy Night" (These Are Special Times, 1998)
- "On ne change pas" (S'il suffisait d'aimer, 1998)
- "On ne change pas" (Live) (Au cœur du stade, 1999)
- "On s'est aimé à cause" (D'elles, 2007)
- "On traverse un miroir" (Incognito, 1987)
- "One Heart" (One Heart, 2003)
- "Only One Road" (The Colour of My Love, 1993)
- "Only One Road" (Live) (Falling into You bonus track, 1996)
- "Open Arms" (Loved Me Back to Life Japanese Edition bonus track, 2013)
- "Ordinaire" (Encore un soir, 2016)
- "Ouverture" (Live) (Céline Dion en concert, 1985)
- "Over the Rainbow" (Live) (Céline Dion en concert, 1985)
- "Overjoyed" (featuring Stevie Wonder) (Loved Me Back to Life, 2013)
- "Oxygène" (Dion chante Plamondon, 1991)

== P ==
- "Papillon" (S'il suffisait d'aimer, 1998)
- "Parler à mon père" (Sans attendre, 2012)
- "Partout je te vois" (Incognito, 1987)
- "Paul et Virginie" (Du soleil au cœur, 1983)
- "Père Noël arrive ce soir" (Céline Dion chante Noël, 1981)
- "Petit Papa Noël" (Céline Dion chante Noël, 1981)
- "Petit Papa Noël" (featuring The Chipmunks) (A Very Merry Chipmunk, 1994)
- "Piaf chanterait du rock" (Dion chante Plamondon, 1991)
- "Plus haut que moi" (duet with Mario Pelchat) (Pelchat, 1993)
- "Plus qu'ailleurs (Encore un soir, 2016)
- "Pour que tu m'aimes encore" (D'eux, 1995)
- "Pour que tu m'aimes encore" (Live) (Live à Paris, 1996)
- "Pour que tu m'aimes encore" (Live) (Au cœur du stade, 1999)
- "Pour que tu m'aimes encore" (Demo Version) (D'eux 15th Anniversary Edition bonus track, 2010)
- "Pour vous" (C'est pour toi, 1985)
- "Pourquoi je crois encore au Père Noël" (Chants et contes de Noël, 1983)
- "Prayer" (A New Day Has Come, 2002)
- "Prière païenne" (D'eux, 1995)
- "Prière païenne" (Live) (Live à Paris, 1996)
- "Promenade en traîneau" (Céline Dion chante Noël, 1981)

== Q ==
- "Quand on n'a que l'amour" (Live) (À l'Olympia, 1994)
- "Quand on n'a que l'amour" (Live) (Live à Paris, 1996)
- "Quand on n'a que l'amour" (featuring Maurane, La Soirée des Enfoirés 96, 1996)
- "Quand on s'aime" (featuring René Simard) (Hier... encore, 2003)
- "Que toi au monde" (Sans attendre, 2012)
- "Quelqu'un que j'aime, quelqu'un qui m'aime" (Dion chante Plamondon, 1991)
- "Qui peut vivre sans amour?" (Sans attendre, 2012)

== R ==
- "Rain, Tax (It's Inevitable)" (A New Day Has Come, 2002)
- "Real Emotion" (The Colour of My Love, 1993)
- "Refuse to Dance" (The Colour of My Love, 1993)
- "Regarde-moi" (D'eux, 1995)
- "Regarde-moi" (Live) (Live à Paris, 1996)
- "Retiens-moi" (1 fille & 4 types, 2003)
- "Reveal" (One Heart, 2003)
- "Rien n'est vraiment fini" (1 fille & 4 types, 2003)
- "Right in Front of You" (A New Day Has Come, 2002)
- "Right Next to the Right One" (Taking Chances, 2007)
- "River Deep, Mountain High" (Falling into You, 1996)
- "River Deep, Mountain High" (Live) (Falling into You bonus track, 1996)
- "River Deep, Mountain High" (Live) (Live à Paris, 1996)

== S ==
- "Sainte nuit" (Céline Dion chante Noël, 1981)
- "Save Your Soul" (Loved Me Back to Life, 2013)
- "Say Yes" (Courage, 2019)
- "Seduces Me" (Falling into You, 1996)
- "Send Me a Lover (Kumbaya Album Nineteen Ninety Four, 1994)
- "Seul un oiseau blanc" (La voix du bon Dieu, 1981)
- "Shadow of Love" (Taking Chances, 2007)
- "Show Some Emotion" (Celine Dion, 1992)
- "Si c'était à refaire" (Encore un soir, 2016)
- "Si Dieu existe" (featuring Claude Dubois) (Duos Dubois, 2010)
- "Si je n'ai rien de toi" (Sans attendre, 2012)
- "Si j'étais quelqu'un" (D'elles, 2007)
- "S'il suffisait d'aimer" (S'il suffisait d'aimer, 1998)
- "S'il suffisait d'aimer" (Live) (duet with Jean-Jacques Goldman) (Au cœur du stade, 1999)
- "Skies of L.A." (Taking Chances, 2007)
- "Sleep Tight" (Miracle, 2004)
- "Sola Otra Vez" (Falling into You bonus track, 1996)
- "Somebody Loves Somebody" (Loved Me Back to Life, 2013)
- "Something So Right" (with Miss Piggy, Kermit and The Muppets) (Muppets Most Wanted, 2014)
- "Sorry for Love" (A New Day Has Come, 2002)
- "Sorry for Love" (2003 Version) (One Heart, 2003)
- "Soul" (Courage Japanese Bonus Track, 2019)
- "Soul Medley: Sex Machine / Soul Man / Lady Marmalade / Sir Duke / Respect / I Got the Feelin' / I Got You (I Feel Good)" (Live) (Taking Chances World Tour: The Concert, 2010)
- "Sous le vent" (duet with Garou, Seul, 2001)
- "Stand by Your Side" (One Heart, 2003)
- "Super Love" (A New Day Has Come bonus track, 2002)
- "Superwoman" (Diane Warren: The Cave Sessions Vol. 1, 2021)
- "Sur le même bateau" (S'il suffisait d'aimer, 1998)
- "Surprise Surprise" (Taking Chances, 2007)

== T ==
- "Taking Chances" (Taking Chances, 2007)
- "Taking Chances" (I-Soul Extended Remix) (Taking Chances, 2007)
- "Tant de temps" (featuring Henri Salvador) (Sans attendre, 2012)
- "Tell Him" (featuring Barbra Streisand) (Let's Talk About Love, 1997)
- "Tellement j'ai d'amour pour toi" (Tellement j'ai d'amour..., 1982)
- "Tellement j'ai d'amour pour toi" (Live) (Céline Dion en concert, 1985)
- "Ten Days" (A New Day Has Come, 2002)
- "Terre" (S'il suffisait d'aimer, 1998)
- "Terre" (Live) (Au cœur du stade, 1999)
- "Testimony" (With Miscellenaous artists) (VH1 Divas Live, 1998)
- "Thank You" (Loved Me Back to Life, 2013)
- "Thankful" (Loved Me Back to Life, 2013)
- "That's Just the Woman in Me" (Taking Chances, 2007)
- "That's the Way It Is" (All the Way... A Decade of Song, 1999)
- "That's the Way It Is" (The Metro Club Remix) (My Love: Ultimate Essential Collection bonus track, 2008)
- "The Chase" (Courage, 2019)
- "The Christmas Song (Chestnuts Roasting on an Open Fire)" (These Are Special Times, 1998)
- "The Christmas Song (Chestnuts Roasting on an Open Fire)" (with David Foster) (The Christmas Album, 1993)
- "The Colour of My Love" (The Colour of My Love, 1993)
- "The First Time Ever I Saw Your Face" (Miracle, 2004)
- "The Gift" (Love Again, 2023)
- "The Greatest Reward" (A New Day Has Come, 2002)
- "The Hard Way" (Courage, 2019)
- "The Last to Know" (Unison, 1990)
- "The Magic of Christmas Day (God Bless Us Everyone)" (These Are Special Times, 1998)
- "The Magic of Christmas Day (God Bless Us Everyone)" (featuring Rosie O'Donnell (A Rosie Christmas, 1999)
- "The Power of Love" (The Colour of My Love, 1993)
- "The Power of Love" (Live) (À l'Olympia, 1994)
- "The Power of Love" (Live) (Falling into You bonus track, 1996)
- "The Power of Love" (Live) (Live à Paris, 1996)
- "The Power of Love" (Radio Edit) (All the Way... A Decade of Song, 1999)
- "The Power of the Dream" (It's All Coming Back To Me Now single, 1996)
- "The Prayer" (featuring Andrea Bocelli) (These Are Special Times, 1998)
- "The Reason" (Let's Talk About Love, 1997)
- "The Reason" (featuring Carole King, VH1 Divas Live, 1998)
- "The Reason" (Backing vocals) (Love Makes the World, 2001)
- "The Reason I Go On" (Taking Chances bonus track, 2007)
- "The Show Must Go On" (featuring Lindsey Stirling, single release, 2016)
- "Then You Look at Me" (All the Way... A Decade of Song, 1999)
- "There Comes a Time" (My Love: Essential Collection, 2008)
- "These Are the Special Times" (These Are Special Times, 1998)
- "Think Twice" (The Colour of My Love, 1993)
- "Think Twice" (Live) (Falling into You bonus track, 1996)
- "This Time" (Taking Chances, 2007)
- "Tire l'aiguille" (La voix du bon Dieu, 1981)
- "To Love You More" (The Colour of My Love Japanese re-release bonus track, 1995)
- "To Love You More" (Tony Moran Mix) (Let's Talk About Love bonus track, 1997)
- "To Love You More" (Radio Edit) (All the Way... A Decade of Song, 1999)
- "Todo Para Ti" (With Miscellaneous artists) ("What More Can I Give" single, 2003)
- "Toi et moi" (featuring Charles Aznavour) (Duos, 2008)
- "Toi sur ta montagne" (Les chemins de ma maison, 1983)
- "Tonight We Dance (Extravagance!)" (Tycoon, 1992)
- "Tous les blues sont écrits pour toi" (S'il suffisait d'aimer, 1998)
- "Tous les secrets" (On ne change pas, 2005)
- "Tout l'or des hommes" (1 fille & 4 types, 2003)
- "Tout près du bonheur" (featuring Marc Dupré) (Refaire le monde, 2006)
- "Toutes ces choses" (Encore un soir, 2016)
- "Treat Her Like a Lady" (Let's Talk About Love, 1997)
- "Trois heures vingt" (Du soleil au cœur, 1983)
- "Trop jeune à dix-sept ans" (Du soleil au cœur, 1983)
- "Tu es là" (C'est pour toi, 1985)
- "Tu nages" (1 fille & 4 types, 2003)
- "Tu restes avec moi" (Tellement j'ai d'amour..., 1982)
- "Tu sauras" (Encore un soir, 2016)

== U ==
- "Un amour pour moi" (Mélanie, 1984)
- "Un enfant" (Chants et contes de Noël, 1983)
- "Un garçon pas comme les autres (Ziggy)" (Dion chante Plamondon, 1991)
- "Un garçon pas comme les autres (Ziggy)" (Live) (À l'Olympia, 1994)
- "Un garçon pas comme les autres (Ziggy)" (Live) (Live à Paris, 1996)
- "Une chance qu'on s'a" (featuring Jean-Pierre Ferland) (Sans attendre, 2012)
- "Une colombe" (Mélanie, 1984)
- "Une colombe" (Live) (Céline Dion en concert, 1985)
- "Unfinished Songs" (From the movie Song for Marion (released in the United States as Unfinished Song) (Loved Me Back to Life, 2013)
- "Unison" (Unison, 1990)
- "Unison" (Remix) (Let's Talk About Love bonus track, 1997)
- "Up Where We Belong" (duet with Paul Baillargeon) (Live) (Céline Dion en concert, 1985)
- "Us" (Let's Talk About Love, 1997)

== V ==
- "Va où s'en va l'amour" (Mélanie, 1984)
- "Valse adieu" (Hidden track) (1 fille & 4 types, 2003)
- "Visa pour les beaux jours" (Tellement j'ai d'amour..., 1982)
- "Vivre et donner" (Les chemins de ma maison, 1983)
- "Voices That Care" (With various artists) ("Voices That Care" single, 1991)
- "Vole" (D'eux, 1995)
- "Vole" (Live) (Live à Paris, 1996)
- "Voler" (with Michel Sardou) (Être une femme 2010, 2010)

== W ==
- "Waiting on You" (Love Again, 2023)
- "Water and a Flame" (Loved Me Back to Life, 2013)
- "Water from the Moon" (Celine Dion, 1992)
- "We Are the World 25 for Haiti" (as part of Artists for Haiti, 2010)
- "What a Feeling" (Céline Dion en concert, 1985)
- "What a Wonderful World" (Miracle, 2004)
- "What a Wonderful World" (Live) (A New Day... Live in Las Vegas, 2004)
- "What More Can I Give" (with the All Stars, 2003)
- "When I Fall in Love" (featuring Clive Griffin) (The Colour of My Love, 1993)
- "When I Need You" (Let's Talk About Love, 1997)
- "When the Wrong One Loves You Right" (A New Day Has Come, 2002)
- "Where Does My Heart Beat Now" (Unison, 1990)
- "Where Does My Heart Beat Now" (Live) (À l'Olympia, 1994)
- "Where Is the Love" (Let's Talk About Love, 1997)
- "White Christmas" (with David Foster and other artists) (The Christmas Album, 1993)
- "Why Oh Why" (Let's Talk About Love, 1997)
- "Wicked Game" (featuring Chris Isaak) (Spotify Singles, 2020)
- "Wishful Thinking" (duet with Dan Hill) (Real Love, 1989)
- "With This Tear" (Celine Dion, 1992)

== Y ==
- "Y'a pas de mots" (with Marc Dupré) (Entre deux mondes, 2010)
- "You and I" (A New Day... Live in Las Vegas, 2004)
- "You and Me" (featuring Charles Aznavour, Duos, 2008)
- "(You Make Me Feel Like A) Natural Woman" (Falling into You bonus track, 1996)
- "(You Make Me Feel Like A) Natural Woman" (with Aretha Franklin, Gloria Estefan, Mariah Carey, Shania Twain and Carole King, VH1 Divas Live, 1998)
- "You Shook Me All Night Long" (with Anastacia, VH1 Divas Las Vegas, 2002)
- "Your Light" (Falling into You bonus track, 1996)
- "You've Got a Friend" (with Gloria Estefan, Shania Twain and Carole King, VH1 Divas Live, 1998)

== Z ==
- "Ziggy" (English version of "Un garçon pas comme les autres (Ziggy)") (Tycoon, 1992)
- "Zora sourit" (S'il suffisait d'aimer, 1998)

== Unreleased/unfinished/rare songs ==
- "Aren't They All Our Children" (With Miscellaneous artists) (The Concert for World Children's Day DVD, 2002)
- "Ave Maria" (Schubert)
- "Bad"
- "Bozo"
- "Brûle pas tes doigts"
- "Cabaret"
- "Can't Help Falling In Love" (The Colour of My Love Concert Video/DVD, 1995)
- "Can't We Try"
- "Cent mille chansons" (featuring Eddy Marnay)
- "C'est Noël"
- "Chain of Fools"
- "Chante"
- "Chattanooga Choo Choo"
- "Conga" (featuring Gloria Estefan)
- "Dans la main d'un magicien" ("Opération Beurre de pinottes" soundtrack, 1985)
- "Emotion" (with Destiny's Child)
- "Encore et encore" (featuring Francis Cabrel)
- "Girls Just Want to Have Fun"
- "Hand in Hand" (German version of Ne partez pas sans moi) (1988)
- "Hard to Say I'm Sorry"
- "Have You Ever Been in Love" (Spanish version) (2002/2003)
- "Hello Mego"
- "Here We Are"
- "Hold On I'm Coming" (featuring Michael Bolton)
- "Hommage à Garou"
- "Hommage à Luc Plamondon"
- "I Finally Found Someone"
- "I Have to Dream" (Children on Their Birthdays DVD, 2002)
- "If You Only Believe"
- "Imagine"
- "I'm Gonna Make You Love Me" (One minute and half long version for The Hudson's Bay commercial)
- "Is Nothing Sacred Anymore"
- "Is This What I Get for Loving You" (Unreleased working tape from a Phil Spector production session) (1996)
- "It's Only Love" (featuring Bryan Adams) (1999)
- "Je n'ai pas peur de mourir avec toi"
- "Je reviendrai à Montréal"
- "Knock on Wood" (featuring Carole Fredericks)
- "La ballade de Michel" (Opération beurre de pinottes soundtrack, 1985)
- "La petite vie"
- "La souris verte"
- "La vie en rose"
- "Le petit roi"
- "L'envie" (featuring Johnny Hallyday)
- "L'envie d'aimer"
- "Les fleurs malades" (featuring Jean Lapointe)
- "Les yeux de la faim" (With Miscellaneous artists) (Les yeux de la faim 7, 1985)
- "L'hymne à l'amour"
- "Listen to Me" (featuring Warren Wiebe) (Celebration, 1989)
- "Listen to the Magic Man" (English version of "Dans la main d'un magicien", The Peanut Butter Solution soundtrack, 1985)
- "L'ombre s'enfuit"
- "L'univers a besoin d'amour" (1986) / (featuring Paul Baillargeon known as "L'univers a besoin d'amour (Version feux), 1986)
- "Medley : Une colombe / L'oiseau / Le temps qui court"
- "Memory"
- "Mes ailes à moi" (One-minute-long French version of "You And I ", for Air Canada commercials)
- "Mes blues passent pu dans' porte" (featuring Breen Leboeuf)
- "Michael's Song" (French version of "La ballade de Michel", The Peanut Butter Solution soundtrack, 1985)
- "Mon Ami, Geh Nicht Fort" (German version of "Mon ami m'a quittée") 1984
- "My Heart Belongs to Daddy"
- "My Way"
- "Nur Das Leben" (German version of C'est pour vivre)
- "O Canada"
- "Over the Rainbow" (1985)
- "Papa Don't Preach"
- "Paroles, paroles" (featuring Alain Delon)
- "Prenez-moi"
- "Quand ça balance"
- "Quand les hommes vivront d'amour"
- "Run Like a River"
- "Saturday Night's Alright (For Fighting)"
- "Saving All My Love for You"
- "Seulement qu'une aventure"
- "Something"
- "Sometimes I Feel Like a Motherless Child"
- "Somewhere"
- "Somos Novios/It's Impossible" (Spanglish duet with Luis Miguel)
- "Sorry Seems to Be the Hardest Word"
- "Stayin' Alive / You Should Be Dancing" (Au cœur du stade Video/DVD, 1999)
- "Summertime"
- "Tears in Heaven"
- "That's What Friends Are For"
- "The Best"
- "Greatest Love of All"
- "The Star-Spangled Banner"
- "Ton fils"
- "Ton visage"
- "Tonight I'll See the Morning With Him" (unreleased working tape from a Phil Spector production session) (1996)
- "Twist and Shout" (Celine Dion... Live in Memphis Video), 1997)
- "Un jour un enfant"
- "Un pays pour nous"
- "Vois comme c'est beau" (featuring Claudette Dion) (Hymnes à l'amour, vol. 2, 1985)
- "Was Bedeute Ich Dir" (German version of "D'amour ou d'amitié") (1984)
- "What Am I to Do" (Unreleased working tape from a Phil Spector production session (1996)
- "What I Did for Love"
- "When You're Gone" (featuring Bryan Adams) (1999)
- "Wind Beneath My Wings"
- "With One More Look at You/Watch Closely Now"
- "Would I Know"
