= Celine Dion albums discography =

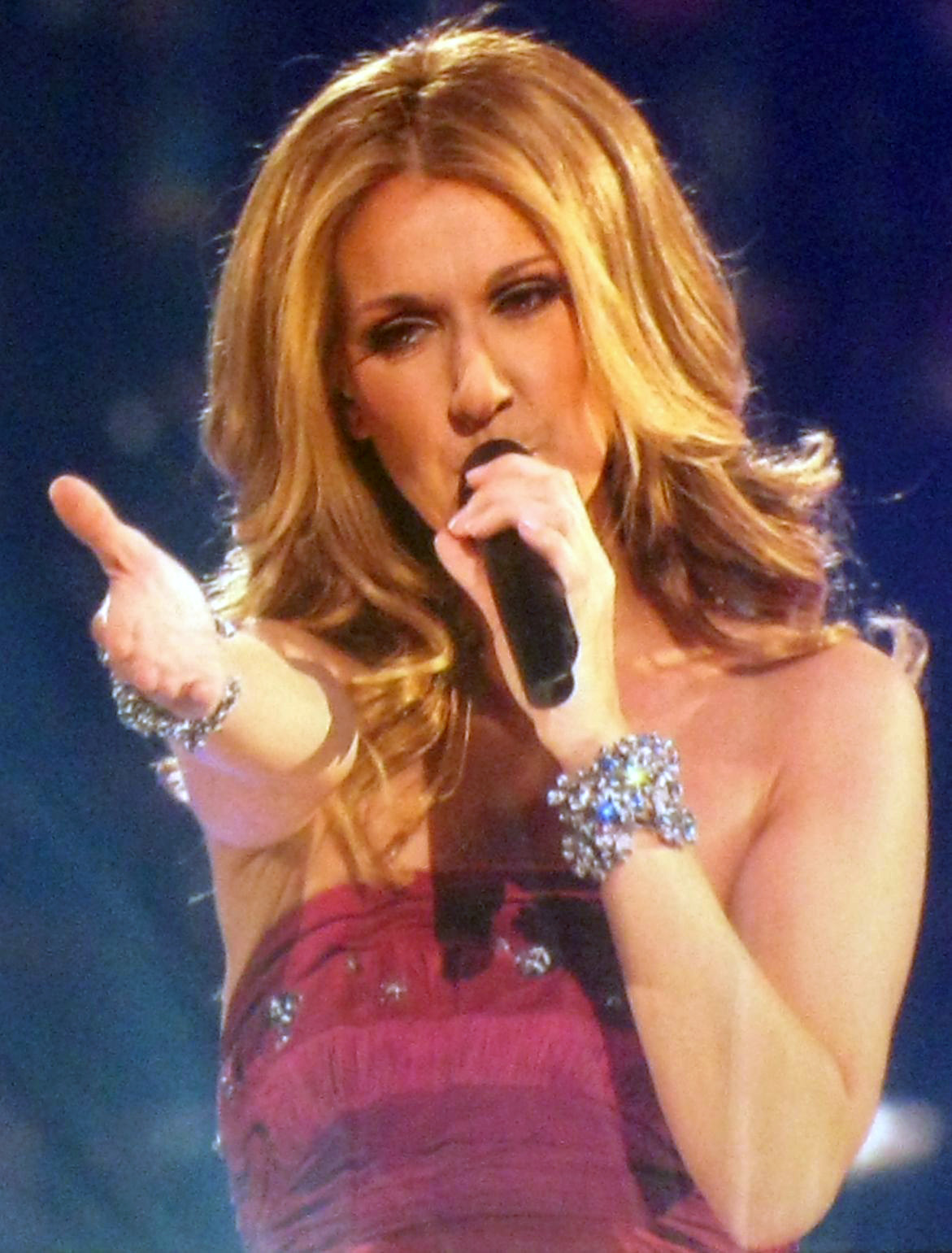
- Dion performing on the Taking Chances World Tour in August 2008
- Studio albums: 27
- Soundtrack albums: 2
- Live albums: 7
- Compilation albums: 20
- Box sets: 25

Canadian singer Celine Dion has released 27 studio albums, 2 soundtrack albums, 7 live albums, 20 compilation albums, and 25 box sets. Often described as the "Queen of power ballads", Dion is the best-selling Canadian artist of all time and the best-selling artist of the Nielsen SoundScan era in Canada (from 1996 to the present). She is also the second best-selling female artist of the Nielsen era in the United States, with over 53.2 million albums sold since Nielsen began tracking sales in 1991. Guinness World Records recognises her as the Top Selling Album Act in Europe, with 33 million certified album sales since 1996. In 2003, Dion was honoured by the International Federation of the Phonographic Industry for selling 50 million albums in Europe. Billboard ranked her the second best-selling female album artist of the 2000s in the United States, with 17.3 million albums sold via SoundScan. According to Billboard, Dion is the sixth greatest Billboard 200 female solo artist of all time, as well as the eighth greatest female solo artist of all time in Billboard's overall chart history.

Her debut album, La voix du bon Dieu, was issued in 1981. In the 1980s, Dion released her French-language albums in Canada, with several compilation albums also issued in France. Her first English-language album, Unison, was released in 1990 and has sold over four million copies worldwide. It was followed by Dion chante Plamondon in 1991 and Celine Dion in 1992. The latter became one of six of her albums to be certified Diamond in Canada for shipments of at least one million units. Dion's popularity became firmly established with her 1993 album, The Colour of My Love, which topped charts in several countries, including the United Kingdom, Canada, and Australia, and has sold 20 million copies worldwide. In the United States, it was certified six-times platinum. Released in 1995, D'eux became the best-selling French-language album in history, with sales of 12 million copies worldwide. In France alone, D'eux spent 44 weeks at number one and has sold 4.5 million units, becoming the best-selling album of all time. It also became Dion's first of six Diamond-certified albums in France.

Falling into You (1996) and Let's Talk About Love (1997) were major successes for Dion, both reaching number one in numerous countries and becoming two of the best-selling albums of all time, with sales of over 32 million and 31 million copies, respectively. Both albums were certified Diamond in the United States, with Falling into You later certified twelve-times platinum and Let's Talk About Love certified eleven-times platinum for 11 million units. Let's Talk About Love became the first album to be certified ten-times platinum by the IFPI for sales of over 10 million copies in Europe.

In 1998, Dion released another French-language album, S'il suffisait d'aimer, and her first English-language holiday album, These Are Special Times, which became the fourth best-selling Christmas album in the United States in the Nielsen SoundScan era, with sales of 5.6 million copies. Worldwide, it has sold over 12 million units. A greatest hits compilation with seven new recordings, All the Way... A Decade of Song was issued in November 1999, topping charts worldwide and selling over 22 million copies globally. In the United States, All the Way... A Decade of Song became the best-selling greatest hits album by a female artist in the Nielsen SoundScan era, surpassing eight million sales. In Japan, it was certified two-times Million for shipments of two million copies.

In March 2002, after a two-year break, Dion returned with the album A New Day Has Come, which topped charts in many countries and has sold 12 million copies worldwide. During the five-year run of her Las Vegas residency show, A New Day..., Dion released five studio albums: One Heart (2003), 1 fille & 4 types (2003), Miracle (2004), D'elles (2007), and Taking Chances (2007). In 2012, she began recording songs for new French- and English-language albums. Sans attendre was released in November 2012, topped charts in Francophone countries, and became the best-selling album of 2012 in France, where it was certified Diamond. Loved Me Back to Life followed in November 2013 and became Dion's 13th number-one album in the Nielsen SoundScan era in Canada and her 11th to debut at the top. It also reached number two in the United States and number three in the United Kingdom and France. Loved Me Back to Life was certified four-times platinum in Canada, two-times platinum in France, and platinum in the United Kingdom. In August 2016, a few months after the death of her husband and manager René Angélil, Dion released the French-language album Encore un soir, which topped charts in Francophone countries and was certified Diamond in France. In 2019, Dion released her 12th English studio album, Courage, which debuted at number one on the Billboard 200, becoming her first US number-one album in 17 years.

Dion has sold an estimated 200 to 250 million records worldwide, and is recognized as one of the world's best-selling music artists. In 1997–1998, Dion sold more than 60 million albums and was estimated to sell a record once every 1.2 seconds. She is also recognized as the world's top-selling artist of the 1990s. In 2004, she received the Chopard Diamond Award at the World Music Awards in recognition of being the best-selling female artist of all time. In 2007, Dion received the Legend Award at the World Music Awards for her global success and contribution to the music industry. She is also the first and only female singer to have achieved three 8-million sellers in the United States since 1991. Her albums Falling into You, Let's Talk About Love, All the Way... A Decade of Song, The Colour of My Love, and These Are Special Times are among the top 100 certified albums according to the Recording Industry Association of America (RIAA). Four of her albums — Let's Talk About Love, All the Way... A Decade of Song, Falling into You, and These Are Special Times — are among the top 10 best-selling Canadian albums in the SoundScan era in Canada.

== Studio albums ==
=== 1980s ===
Title	Album details	Peak chart positions		Sales	Certifications
Title	Album details	CAN QC	BEL	Sales	Certifications
La voix du bon Dieu	Released: 6 November 1981; Label: Super Étoiles; Formats: LP, cassette	—	—	CAN: 100,000	
Céline Dion chante Noël	Released: 4 December 1981; Label: Super Étoiles; Formats: LP, cassette	—	—		
Tellement j'ai d'amour...	Released: 7 September 1982; Label: Saisons; Formats: LP, cassette	3	—	CAN: 150,000	CAN: Platinum
Les chemins de ma maison	Released: 7 September 1983; Label: Saisons; Formats: LP, cassette	1	—	CAN: 100,000	CAN: Gold
Chants et contes de Noël	Released: 3 December 1983; Label: Saisons; Formats: LP, cassette	17	—		
Mélanie	Released: 22 August 1984; Label: TBS; Formats: LP, cassette	1	—		CAN: Gold
C'est pour toi	Released: 27 August 1985; Label: TBS; Formats: LP, cassette	1	—		
Incognito	Released: 2 April 1987; Label: CBS; Formats: CD, LP, cassette	1	65	WW: 500,000	CAN: 2× Platinum
"—" denotes releases that did not chart or were not released.

=== 1990s ===
Title	Album details	Peak chart positions										Sales	Certifications
Title	Album details	CAN	AUS	BEL	FRA	GER	JPN	NLD	SWI	UK	US	Sales	Certifications
Unison	Released: 2 April 1990; Label: Columbia, Epic; Formats: CD, LP, cassette	15	117	56	—	—	—	—	—	55	74	World: 4,000,000; US: 1,227,000	CAN: 7× Platinum; AUS: Gold; FRA: Gold; UK: Gold; US: Platinum
Dion chante Plamondon (Des mots qui sonnent)	Released: 4 November 1991; Label: Columbia, Epic; Formats: CD, LP, cassette	57	—	17	4	—	—	—	—	—	—	World: 2,000,000; FRA: 660,000; US: 275,000	CAN: 2× Platinum; BEL: Gold; FRA: 2× Platinum
Celine Dion	Released: 30 March 1992; Label: Columbia, Epic; Formats: CD, LP, MD, cassette	3	15	—	—	—	59	—	—	70	34	World: 5,000,000; UK: 50,000; US: 3,024,000 (Note: As of May 2016, Celine Dion has sold 2,400,000 copies in the United States according to Nielsen SoundScan, with an additional 624,000 units sold at BMG Music Club. SoundScan does not count albums sold through clubs like the BMG Music Service, which were significantly popular in the 1990s.)	CAN: Diamond; AUS: Platinum; JPN: Gold; UK: Gold; US: 2× Platinum
The Colour of My Love	Released: 9 November 1993; Label: Columbia, Epic; Formats: CD, LP, MD, cassette	1	1	1	7	16	7	2	9	1	4	World: 20,000,000; CAN: 1,500,000; JPN: 1,013,450; UK: 1,816,915; US: 4,600,000	CAN: Diamond; AUS: 9× Platinum; BEL: 2× Platinum; FRA: Platinum; GER: Gold; JPN: 3× Platinum; NLD: 3× Platinum; SWI: Platinum; UK: 5× Platinum; US: 6× Platinum
D'eux (The French Album)	Released: 30 March 1995; Label: Columbia, Epic; Formats: CD, LP, cassette	29	138	1	1	69	50	1	1	7	—	World: 12,000,000; FRA: 4,500,000; UK: 250,000; US: 300,000	CAN: 7× Platinum; BEL: 6× Platinum; FRA: Diamond; NLD: Platinum; SWI: 4× Platinum; UK: Gold
Falling into You	Released: 11 March 1996; Label: Columbia, Epic; Formats: CD, LP, cassette	1	1	1	1	5	6	1	1	1	1	World: 32,000,000; AUS: 1,000,000; UK: 2,193,998; US: 11,887,000 (Note: As of November 2019, Falling into You has sold 10,900,000 copies in the United States according to Nielsen SoundScan, with an additional 987,000 units sold at BMG Music Club. SoundScan does not count albums sold through clubs like the BMG Music Service, which were significantly popular in the 1990s.)	CAN: Diamond; AUS: 13× Platinum; BEL: 4× Platinum; FRA: Diamond; GER: 5× Gold; JPN: 4× Platinum; NLD: 6× Platinum; SWI: 3× Platinum; UK: 7× Platinum; US: 12× Platinum
Let's Talk About Love	Released: 14 November 1997; Label: Columbia, Epic; Formats: CD, LP, cassette	1	1	1	1	1	5	1	1	1	1	World: 31,000,000; CAN: 1,700,000; UK: 2,000,000; US: 10,711,000 (Note: As of February 2013, Let's Talk About Love has sold 9,601,000 copies in the United States according to Nielsen SoundScan, with an additional 1,110,000 units sold at BMG Music Club. SoundScan does not count albums sold through clubs like the BMG Music Service, which were significantly popular in the 1990s.)	CAN: Diamond; AUS: 7× Platinum; BEL: 4× Platinum; FRA: Diamond; GER: 3× Platinum; JPN: Million; NLD: 5× Platinum; SWI: 6× Platinum; UK: 6× Platinum; US: 11× Platinum
S'il suffisait d'aimer	Released: 31 August 1998; Label: Columbia, Epic; Formats: CD, LP, cassette	1	—	1	1	11	37	4	1	17	—	World: 4,000,000; CAN: 500,000; GER: 120,000; JPN: 41,000; UK: 100,000; US: 112,000	CAN: 4× Platinum; BEL: 2× Platinum; FRA: Diamond; NLD: Gold; SWI: 2× Platinum; UK: Gold
These Are Special Times	Released: 30 October 1998; Label: Columbia, Epic; Formats: CD, LP, MD, cassette	1	6	12	23	3	4	3	1	20	2	World: 12,000,000; JPN: 500,000; US: 5,600,000	CAN: Diamond; AUS: Platinum; BEL: Platinum; GER: Gold; JPN: 2× Platinum; NLD: Gold; SWI: 2× Platinum; UK: Platinum; US: 6× Platinum
"—" denotes releases that did not chart or were not released.

=== 2000s ===
Title	Album details	Peak chart positions										Sales	Certifications
Title	Album details	CAN	AUS	BEL	FRA	GER	JPN	NLD	SWI	UK	US	Sales	Certifications
A New Day Has Come	Released: 25 March 2002; Label: Columbia, Epic; Formats: CD, SACD, MD, cassette	1	1	1	1	2	15	1	1	1	1	World: 12,000,000; AUS: 160,000; US: 3,307,000	CAN: 6× Platinum; AUS: 2× Platinum; BEL: 2× Platinum; FRA: 3× Platinum; GER: 3× Gold; JPN: Gold; NLD: Platinum; SWI: 3× Platinum; UK: Platinum; US: 3× Platinum
One Heart	Released: 24 March 2003; Label: Columbia, Epic; Formats: CD, cassette	1	6	1	1	6	27	3	1	4	2	World: 5,000,000; UK: 204,075; US: 1,800,000	CAN: 3× Platinum; AUS: Platinum; BEL: Gold; FRA: Platinum; GER: Gold; SWI: Platinum; UK: Gold; US: 2× Platinum
1 fille & 4 types	Released: 13 October 2003; Label: Columbia, Epic; Formats: CD, CD/DVD, LP, cassette	1	—	1	1	26	—	30	2	—	—	CAN: 100,000; FRA: 750,000; US: 26,000	CAN: Platinum; BEL: Platinum; FRA: 2× Platinum; SWI: Platinum
Miracle	Released: 11 October 2004; Label: Columbia, Epic; Formats: CD, CD/DVD	1	15	1	4	34	168	4	6	5	4	World: 2,000,000; UK: 109,963; US: 944,000	CAN: Platinum; BEL: Gold; FRA: Gold; SWI: Gold; UK: Gold; US: Platinum
D'elles	Released: 18 May 2007; Label: Columbia, Epic; Formats: CD, CD/DVD, digital download	1	—	1	1	52	—	50	3	—	—	FRA: 300,000	CAN: 2× Platinum; BEL: Gold; FRA: Platinum; SWI: Gold
Taking Chances	Released: 7 November 2007; Label: Columbia, Epic; Formats: CD, CD/DVD, digital download	1	12	3	2	5	6	4	1	5	3	World: 3,100,000; FRA: 150,000; UK: 392,998; US: 1,100,000	CAN: 4× Platinum; AUS: Platinum; BEL: Gold; FRA: Gold; GER: Gold; JPN: Gold; NLD: Gold; SWI: Platinum; UK: Platinum; US: Platinum
"—" denotes releases that did not chart or were not released.

=== 2010s ===
Title	Album details	Peak chart positions										Sales	Certifications
Title	Album details	CAN	AUS	BEL	FRA	GER	JPN	NLD	SWI	UK	US	Sales	Certifications
Sans attendre	Released: 2 November 2012; Label: Columbia; Formats: CD, LP, digital download	1	—	1	1	44	—	20	2	158	—	World: 1,500,000; FRA: 800,000; CAN: 300,000	CAN: 3× Platinum; BEL: Platinum; FRA: Diamond; SWI: Gold
Loved Me Back to Life	Released: 1 November 2013; Label: Columbia; Formats: CD, LP, digital download	1	9	2	3	9	34	1	3	3	2	World: 1,500,000; UK: 350,000; US: 300,000	CAN: 4× Platinum; BEL: Gold; FRA: 2× Platinum; UK: Platinum; SWI: Gold
Encore un soir	Released: 26 August 2016; Label: Columbia; Formats: CD, LP, digital download	1	132	1	1	16	—	7	1	88	— (Note: Encore un soir did not enter the Billboard 200, but peaked at number 82 on the Top Current Albums and number 96 on the Top Album Sales chart.)	World: 1,500,000; FRA: 800,000	CAN: 2× Platinum; BEL: Platinum; FRA: Diamond; SWI: Platinum
Courage	Released: 15 November 2019; Label: Columbia; Formats: CD, LP, digital download	1	2	1	2	4	49	10	1	2	1	World: 600,000; CAN: 83,000; FRA: 77,000; US: 113,000	CAN: Platinum; FRA: Platinum; UK: Silver
"—" denotes releases that did not chart or were not released.

== Soundtrack albums ==
Title	Album details	Peak chart positions										Certifications
Title	Album details	CAN	CAN QC	BEL	FRA	JPN	POL Phys.	PRT	SWI	UK OST	US OST	Certifications
Love Again	Released: 12 May 2023; Label: Columbia; Formats: CD, digital, streaming	77	1	10	43	—	32	24	19	2	20	
I Am: Celine Dion (Je suis: Céline Dion)	Released: 21 June 2024; Label: Columbia; Formats: CD, digital, LP, streaming	68	1	20	25	43	75	169	81	— (Note: In the United Kingdom, I Am: Celine Dion appeared on the UK Compilation Chart, where it peaked at number two.)	15	FRA: Gold; UK: Gold
"—" denotes releases that did not chart or were not released.

== Live albums ==
=== 1980s ===
Title	Album details	Peak chart positions
Title	Album details	CAN QC
Céline Dion en concert	Released: 11 November 1985; Label: TBS; Formats: LP, cassette	19

=== 1990s ===
Title	Album details	Peak chart positions										Sales	Certifications
Title	Album details	CAN	CAN QC	AUS	BEL	EUR	FRA	GER	NLD	SWI	UK	Sales	Certifications
À l'Olympia	Released: 21 November 1994; Label: Columbia, Epic; Formats: CD, cassette	31	3	—	19	60	10	—	—	—	—	CAN: 200,000	CAN: Platinum; EU: Platinum; FRA: Platinum
Live à Paris	Released: 21 October 1996; Label: Columbia, Epic; Formats: CD, cassette	7	1	122	1	6	1	63	9	1	53	CAN: 280,000	CAN: 2× Platinum; BEL: Platinum; EU: 2× Platinum; FRA: 2× Platinum; NLD: Gold; SWI: Platinum
Au cœur du stade	Released: 27 August 1999; Label: Columbia, Epic; Formats: CD, cassette	15	1	—	1	—	9	37	23	1	146		CAN: Gold; BEL: Platinum; FRA: 2× Platinum; SWI: Platinum
"—" denotes releases that did not chart or were not released.

=== 2000s ===
Title	Album details	Peak chart positions										Sales	Certifications
Title	Album details	CAN	CAN QC	AUS	BEL	FRA	GER	NLD	SWI	UK	US	Sales	Certifications
A New Day... Live in Las Vegas	Released: 14 June 2004; Label: Columbia, Epic; Formats: CD, CD/DVD	2	1	69	4	9	20	12	13	22	10	US: 530,000	UK: Silver; US: Gold

=== 2010s ===
Title	Album details	Peak chart positions										Certifications
Title	Album details	CAN	AUS	BEL	FRA	GER	JPN	NLD	SWI	UK	US	Certifications
Taking Chances World Tour: The Concert (Tournée mondiale Taking Chances: le spectacle)	Released 29 April 2010; Label: Columbia, Epic; Formats: CD/DVD, digital download	1 (Note: position on the Music DVD Chart)	4 (Note: position on the Music DVD Chart)	3	5	3 (Note: position on the Music DVD Chart)	16 (Note: position on the Music DVD Chart)	11	1 (Note: position on the Music DVD Chart)	11	1 (Note: position on the Music DVD Chart)	CAN: Diamond (Note: French-language version certified Diamond and English-language version certified 4× Platinum) (Note: certified as video); CAN: 4× Platinum (Note: French-language version certified Diamond and English-language version certified 4× Platinum) (Note: certified as video); FRA: Gold; UK: Gold; US: Platinum^{[c]}
Céline une seule fois / Live 2013	Released 16 May 2014; Label: Columbia; Formats: 2CD/DVD, 2CD/BD	10	—	4	2	56	—	12	11	—	—	FRA: Gold
"—" denotes releases that did not chart or were not released.

== Compilation albums ==
=== 1980s ===
Title	Album details	Peak chart positions
Title	Album details	CAN QC
Du soleil au cœur	Released: 20 September 1983; Label: Pathé Marconi/EMI; Formats: LP, cassette	—
Les plus grands succès de Céline Dion	Released: 17 September 1984; Label: TBS; Formats: LP, cassette	—
Les oiseaux du bonheur	Released: 1984; Label: Pathé Marconi/EMI; Formats: LP, cassette	—
Les chansons en or	Released: 22 April 1986; Label: TBS; Formats: CD, LP, cassette	15
The Best of Celine Dion	Released: 2 May 1988; Label: Carrere; Formats: CD, LP, cassette	—
"—" denotes releases that did not chart or were not released.

=== 1990s ===
Title	Album details	Peak chart positions										Sales	Certifications
Title	Album details	CAN	AUS	BEL	FRA	GER	JPN	NLD	SWI	UK	US	Sales	Certifications
Les premières années	Released: 10 January 1994; Label: Versailles; Formats: CD	—	—	12	—	—	—	—	—	—	—		FRA: Gold
Gold Vol. 1 (Les premières chansons vol. 1)	Released: 2 October 1995; Label: BR Music, Budde Music, D-Sharp, Empire Music, MVM; Formats: CD	—	—	32	30	—	64	—	—	135	—		FRA: 2× Gold
Gold Vol. 2 (Les premières chansons vol. 2)	Released: 2 October 1995; Label: Versailles; Formats: CD	—	—	51	—	—	—	—	—	—	—		FRA: Gold
La Romance (14 Love Songs from the Heart)	Released: March 1996; Label: Formats: CD	—	196	—	—	—	—	—	—	—	—		
C'est pour vivre	Released: 3 February 1997; Label: Leader Music, Music Club International; Formats: CD	—	—	32	—	—	—	—	—	49	—		
The Collection 1982–1988	Released: 4 July 1997; Label: Arcade, BR Music, Divucsa; Formats: CD	—	—	20	—	—	—	37	—	—	—		
All the Way... A Decade of Song	Released: 12 November 1999; Label: Columbia, Epic; Formats: CD, SACD, MD, cassette	1	1	1	1	1	1	1	1	1	1	World: 22,000,000; UK: 1,318,223; US: 9,300,000 (Note: As of November 2019, All the Way... A Decade of Song has sold 8,200,000 copies in the United States according to Nielsen SoundScan, with an additional 1,100,000 units sold at BMG Music Club. SoundScan does not count albums sold through clubs like the BMG Music Service, which were significantly popular in the 1990s.)	CAN: Diamond; AUS: 5× Platinum; BEL: 3× Platinum; FRA: 2× Platinum; GER: 7× Gold; JPN: 2× Million; SWI: 3× Platinum; UK: 4× Platinum; US: 7× Platinum
"—" denotes releases that did not chart or were not released.

=== 2000s ===
Title	Album details	Peak chart positions										Sales	Certifications
Title	Album details	CAN	AUS	BEL	FRA	GER	JPN	NLD	SWI	UK	US	Sales	Certifications
The Early Singles	Released: 21 February 2000; Label: BR Music; Formats: CD	—	—	—	—	—	—	—	—	—	—		
The Collector's Series, Volume One (Tout en amour)	Released: 20 October 2000; Label: Columbia, Epic; Formats: CD, cassette	4	51	33	1	28	13	15	12	30	28	World: 3,000,000; US: 914,000	AUS: Gold; FRA: Gold; GER: Gold; JPN: Gold; NLD: Gold; SWI: Gold; UK: Silver; US: Gold
On ne change pas (Best Of – 3 CD)	Released: 30 September 2005; Label: Columbia, Epic; Formats: CD, CD/DVD, digital download	2	—	1	1	72	—	59	2	—	—		CAN: 3× Platinum; BEL: Platinum; FRA: 3× Platinum; SWI: Gold
Complete Best	Released: 27 February 2008; Label: Epic/Sony; Formats: CD	—	—	—	—	—	3	—	—	—	—	JPN: 173,100	JPN: Gold
My Love: Essential Collection (The Essential)	Released 24 October 2008; Label: Columbia, Epic; Formats: CD, digital download	2	24	1	1	24	—	1	9	5	8	US: 543,667	CAN: 4× Platinum; AUS: Platinum; BEL: Platinum; GER: Gold; NLD: Platinum; UK: 5× Platinum
"—" denotes releases that did not chart or were not released.

=== 2010s ===
Title	Album details	Peak chart positions						Sales	Certifications
Title	Album details	AUS	BEL	FRA	JPN	KOR	NZL	Sales	Certifications
The Best of Celine Dion & David Foster	Released: 19 October 2012; Label: Sony; Formats: CD, digital download	—	—	—	—	38	—		
Un peu de nous	Released: 21 July 2017; Label: Columbia; Formats: 3CD	—	6	1	—	—	—	FRA: 80,082	FRA: Gold
The Best So Far... 2018 Tour Edition	Released: 30 May 2018; Label: SMEJ; Formats: Blu-spec CD2, CD, digital download	4	—	—	24	—	4		NZL: Platinum
"—" denotes releases that did not chart or were not released.

== Box sets ==
=== 1990s ===
Title	Album details
Celine Dion / Unison	Released: 12 February 1996; Label: Epic; Formats: 2CD
Gold Vol. 1 / Unison / Gold Vol. 2	Released: 4 November 1996; Label: Versailles; Formats: 3CD
Les premières chansons vol. 1 / Les premières chansons vol. 2	Released: 19 October 1998; Label: Versailles; Formats: 2CD

=== 2000s ===
Title	Album details	Peak chart positions				Certifications
Title	Album details	CAN	JPN	SWE	UK	Certifications
Des mots qui sonnent / Celine Dion / À l'Olympia	Released: 23 October 2000; Label: Columbia; Formats: 3CD	—	—	—	—	
Unison / Celine Dion / The Colour of My Love	Released: 26 March 2002; Label: Epic; Formats: 3CD	—	—	—	—	
S'il suffisait d'aimer / D'eux	Released: 19 May 2003; Label: Columbia; Formats: 2CD	—	—	—	—	
À l'Olympia / Au cœur du stade	Released: 15 September 2003; Label: Columbia; Formats: 2CD	—	—	—	—	
All the Way... A Decade of Song & Video / All the Way... A Decade of Song	Released: 19 September 2003; Label: Epic; Formats: DVD/CD	—	—	—	—	
Let's Talk About Love / A New Day Has Come	Released: 27 September 2004; Label: Columbia; Formats: 2CD	—	—	—	—	
1 fille & 4 types / D'eux / S'il suffisait d'aimer	Released: 15 September 2006; Label: Columbia; Formats: 3CD	—	—	—	—	
Let's Talk About Love / Falling into You / A New Day Has Come	Released: 29 October 2007; Label: Columbia; Formats: 3CD	97	—	3	106	SWE: Gold
Let's Talk About Love / Celine Dion	Released: 26 February 2008; Label: Columbia; Formats: 2CD	—	—	—	—	
Ultimate Box	Released: 27 February 2008; Label: Epic/Sony; Formats: 2CD/3DVD	—	109	—	—	
Celine Dion / S'il suffisait d'aimer	Released: 5 September 2008; Label: Columbia; Formats: 2CD	—	—	—	—	
The Colour of My Love / The Colour of My Love Concert	Released: 12 September 2008; Label: Columbia; Formats: CD/DVD	—	—	—	—	
"—" denotes releases that did not chart or were not released.

=== 2010s ===
Title	Album details	Peak chart positions
Title	Album details	FRA
D'elles / D'eux	Released: 13 September 2010; Label: Columbia; Formats: 2CD	111
Unison / Celine Dion / The Colour of My Love / D'eux / One Heart	Released: 9 January 2012; Label: Columbia; Formats: 5CD	—
Unison / Falling into You / Let's Talk About Love	Released: 2 October 2012; Label: Columbia; Formats: 3CD	—
La collection: Des mots qui sonnent / D'eux / S'il suffisait d'aimer / Au cœur du stade / 1 fille & 4 types / D'elles	Released: 18 November 2013; Label: Columbia; Formats: 5CD/DVD	126
1 fille & 4 types / Sans attendre	Released: 18 August 2014; Label: Columbia; Formats: 2CD	76
Celine Dion Collection	Released: 3 June 2016; Label: Columbia; Formats: 10CD	123
On ne change pas / My Love: Essential Collection	Released: 12 August 2016; Label: Columbia; Formats: 2CD	80
S'il suffisait d'aimer / Live à Paris	Released: 12 August 2016; Label: Columbia; Formats: 2CD	128
Loved Me Back to Life / A New Day Has Come	Released: 12 August 2016; Label: Columbia; Formats: 2CD	152
Encore un soir / Sans attendre	Released: 17 August 2018; Label: Columbia; Formats: 2CD	79
"—" denotes releases that did not chart or were not released.

== See also ==
- Celine Dion singles discography
- Celine Dion videography
- List of best-selling Western artists in Japan
- Best-selling albums in the United States since Nielsen SoundScan tracking began
- List of best-selling albums
- List of best-selling albums by women
- List of best-selling albums in Australia
- List of best-selling albums in Belgium
- List of best-selling albums in Brazil
- List of best-selling albums in Canada
- List of best-selling albums in Europe
- List of best-selling albums in France
- List of best-selling albums in Germany
- List of best-selling albums in Japan
- List of best-selling albums in New Zealand
- List of best-selling albums in the United States
- List of best-selling albums of the 1990s in the United Kingdom
- List of best-selling Christmas/holiday albums in the United States
- List of best-selling music artists
- List of diamond-certified albums in Canada
- List of fastest-selling albums
