= Les premières années =

Compilation album by Celine Dion
- Released: 10 January 1994
- Recorded: 1982–1988
- Genre: Pop
- Length: 63:55
- Label: Versailles
- Producer: Didier Barbelivien; Urs Peter Keller; Eddy Marnay; Romano Musumarra; Rudi Pascal; Atilla Şereftuğ

Celine Dion chronology
The Colour of My Love (1993)	Les premières années (1994)	À l'Olympia (1994)

Les premières années (lit. 'The first years') is a French-language compilation album by Canadian singer Celine Dion. It was released in France by Versailles on 10 January 1994. The album includes 18 tracks recorded between 1982 and 1988, among them the Eurovision-winning song "Ne partez pas sans moi". In France, Les premières années received a gold certification. It was also issued in Belgium, where it reached number 12 on the Wallonia chart.

== Background and release ==
After the success of "Un garçon pas comme les autres (Ziggy)", which reached number two on the French Singles Chart in 1993, Versailles released Les premières années on 10 January 1994. The compilation presents Dion's early and less widely available recordings from the 1980s. Along with the singles, it includes album tracks and singles B-sides ("En amour", "Comment t'aimer").

== Critical reception ==
AllMusic rated the album two and a half out of five stars.

== Commercial performance ==
Following the success of D'eux, Les premières années was certified gold in France in November 1995 for sales exceeding 100,000 copies. After its release in Belgium, the album entered the Wallonia chart in June 1995 and reached number 12 in November 1995.

== Track listing ==
No.	Title	Writer(s)	Producer(s)	Length
1.	"D'amour ou d'amitié"	Eddy Marnay; Jean-Pierre Lang; Roland Vincent	Marnay; Rudi Pascal	4:00
2.	"Visa pour les beaux jours"	Marnay; Christian Loigerot; Thierry Geoffroy	Marnay; Pascal	3:25
3.	"En amour"	Marnay; Loigerot; Geoffroy	Marnay	3:20
4.	"Les oiseaux du bonheur"	Marnay; André Popp	Marnay; Pascal	3:39
5.	"Tellement j'ai d'amour pour toi"	Marnay; Hubert Giraud	Marnay; Pascal	2:57
6.	"La religieuse"	Didier Barbelivien	Barbelivien	3:27
7.	"C'est pour toi"	Marnay; François Orenn	Marnay; Pascal	4:01
8.	"Ne partez pas sans moi"	Nella Martinetti; Atilla Şereftuğ	Urs Peter Keller; Şereftuğ	3:07
9.	"Mon ami m'a quittée"	Marnay; Loigerot; Geoffroy	Marnay; Pascal	2:59
10.	"Avec toi"	Marnay; Loigerot; Geoffroy	Marnay; Pascal	3:27
11.	"Mon rêve de toujours"	Marnay; Jean-Pierre Goussaud	Marnay; Pascal	4:18
12.	"Du soleil au cœur"	Marnay; Jean-Claude Massoulier; Popp	Marnay; Pascal	2:42
13.	"À quatre pas d'ici"	Marnay; Andy Hill; Peter Sinfield	Marnay; Pascal	3:54
14.	"Un amour pour moi"	Marnay; Loigerot; Geoffroy	Marnay; Pascal	3:18
15.	"Billy"	Marnay; Patrick Lemaître	Marnay	3:05
16.	"Comment t'aimer"	Marnay; Romano Musumarra	Musumarra	4:00
17.	"Je ne veux pas"	Marnay; Musumarra	Musumarra	4:06
18.	"C'est pour vivre"	Marnay; Popp	Marnay; Pascal	4:10
Total length:				63:55

== Charts ==
=== Weekly charts ===
Weekly chart performance
Chart (1995)	Peak position
Belgian Albums (Ultratop Wallonia)	12

=== Year-end charts ===
Year-end chart performance
Chart (1995)	Position
Belgian Albums (Ultratop Wallonia)	66
Belgian Francophone Albums (Ultratop Wallonia)	24

== Certifications ==
Certifications
Region	Certification	Certified units/sales
France (SNEP)	Gold	100,000^{*}
^{*} Sales figures based on certification alone.

== Release history ==
Release history
Region	Date	Label	Format	Catalog
France	10 January 1994	Versailles	CD	VER 474653 2
