= Céline Dion en concert =

Live album by Celine Dion
- Released: 20 December 1985
- Recorded: 31 May 1985
- Venue: Place des Arts (Montreal)
- Genre: Pop
- Length: 48:49
- Languages: French; English
- Label: TBS

Celine Dion chronology
C'est pour toi (1985)	Céline Dion en concert (1985)	Les chansons en or (1986)

Céline Dion en concert (lit. 'Celine Dion in concert') is the first live album by Canadian singer Celine Dion. Released in Quebec, Canada on 20 December 1985 through TBS and distributed by Trans‑Canada Disques, the album documents Dion's performance at Place des Arts in Montreal on 31 May 1985. Along with her early French‑language hits, the set includes English‑language interpretations of songs such as "Up Where We Belong", "What a Feeling", and "Over the Rainbow". The album reached number 19 on the Quebec chart.

== Background and conception ==
In 1985, Dion embarked on a tour of 50 Canadian cities. One of the tour's notable dates was the concert held on 31 May 1985 at Montreal's Place des Arts, which was recorded and later issued on cassette and vinyl on 20 December 1985.

The album includes several of Dion's early songs—"D'amour ou d'amitié", "Mon ami m'a quittée", "Une colombe", and "Tellement j'ai d'amour pour toi"—along with English‑language covers that show the range of material performed during the show. Dion also performed medleys honouring Félix Leclerc and Michel Legrand, and included the "Habanera" aria from Georges Bizet's opera Carmen.

Her 1985 tour received industry recognition, earning a nomination for Show of the Year at the Félix Awards. Harvey Robitaille won Sound Engineer of the Year for his work on the tour.

== Track listing ==
No.	Title	Writer(s)	Length
1.	"Ouverture (La première fois)"	Eddy Marnay; Paul Baillargeon	4:14
2.	"Mon ami m'a quittée"	Marnay; Christian Loigerot; Thierry Geoffroy	3:05
3.	"Hommage à Félix Leclerc": "Bozo"; "Le p'tit bonheur"; "Moi, mes souliers"; "Attends-moi "ti-gars""; "Le train du nord"	Leclerc	5:05
4.	"Up Where We Belong" (with Paul Baillargeon)	Will Jennings; Jack Nitzsche; Buffy Sainte-Marie	3:12
5.	"Tellement j'ai d'amour pour toi"	Marnay; Hubert Giraud	3:00
6.	"D'amour ou d'amitié"	Marnay; Jean-Pierre Lang; Roland Vincent	3:30
7.	"Over the Rainbow"	Yip Harburg; Harold Arlen	3:33
8.	"Hommage à Michel Legrand": "Quand on s'aime"; "Brûle pas tes doigts"; "La valse du lilas"; "Quand ça balance"; "Les moulins de mon cœur"	Marnay; Legrand	6:05
9.	"Carmen (L'amour est enfant de bohême)"	Georges Bizet	3:40
10.	"What a Feeling"	Keith Forsey; Irene Cara; Giorgio Moroder	4:10
11.	"Une colombe"	Marcel Lefebvre; Baillargeon	3:15
12.	"Les chemins de ma maison"	Marnay; Patrick Lemaître; Alain Bernard	3:50
13.	"Finale (La première fois)"	Marnay; Baillargeon	2:10
Total length:			48:49

== Charts ==
Chart performance
Chart (1985)	Peak position
Quebec Albums (ADISQ)	19

== Release history ==
Release history
Region	Date	Label	Format	Catalog	Ref.
Canada	20 December 1985	TBS	Cassette; vinyl	TBS4‑504; TBS 504	
