= Du soleil au cœur =

Compilation album by Celine Dion
- Released: 20 September 1983
- Recorded: 1982–1983
- Studios: Family Sound (Paris); Montmartre (Paris); St‑Charles (Longueuil)
- Genre: Pop
- Length: 35:55
- Language: French
- Label: Pathé‑Marconi
- Producers: René Angélil; Eddy Marnay; Rudi Pascal

Celine Dion chronology
Les chemins de ma maison (1983)	Du soleil au cœur (1983)	Chants et contes de Noël (1983)

Singles from Du soleil au cœur
- 1. "D'amour ou d'amitié" Released: December 1982; 2. "Mon ami m'a quittée" Released: November 1983

Du soleil au cœur (lit. 'Sunshine in the heart') is the first album by Canadian singer Celine Dion released in France. Issued on 20 September 1983 through Pathé‑Marconi, the compilation introduced French audiences to Dion's early recordings by drawing from her Canadian studio albums Tellement j'ai d'amour... (1982) and Les chemins de ma maison (1983). It also includes one new track, "À quatre pas d'ici", a French adaptation of the UK number‑one single "The Land of Make Believe" by Bucks Fizz.

== Background and conception ==
Du soleil au cœur compiles tracks previously released on Dion's Canadian albums Tellement j'ai d'amour... and Les chemins de ma maison. Its release followed the success of "D'amour ou d'amitié", which reached number five in France and earned a gold certification, making Dion the first Canadian artist to receive this recognition in the country. The compilation was issued to present Dion's early work to a wider French audience and reflects her growing collaboration with lyricist Eddy Marnay. In 2002, the album was reissued on CD by Sony Music with five additional tracks from Dion's early recordings.

== Track listing ==
All tracks were produced by Eddy Marnay and Rudi Pascal, except "Le vieux monsieur de la rue Royale", produced by Marnay and René Angélil.

No.	Title	Writer(s)	Length
1.	"D'amour ou d'amitié"	Marnay; Jean-Pierre Lang; Roland Vincent	3:58
2.	"La do do la do"	Marnay; Christian Gaubert	3:00
3.	"Mon ami m'a quittée"	Marnay; Christian Loigerot; Thierry Geoffroy	3:00
4.	"Ne me plaignez pas" (extended)	Marnay; Steve Thompson	3:44
5.	"Tellement j'ai d'amour pour toi"	Marnay; Hubert Giraud	2:56
6.	"Du soleil au cœur"	Marnay; Jean-Claude Massoulier; André Popp	2:40
7.	"À quatre pas d'ici"	Marnay; Andy Hill; Peter Sinfield	3:57
8.	"Les chemins de ma maison"	Marnay; Patrick Lemaître; Alain Bernard	4:15
9.	"Hello Mister Sam"	Marnay; Loigerot; Geoffroy	4:13
10.	"Le vieux monsieur de la rue Royale"	Marnay; Alain Noreau	4:12
Total length:			35:55

== Notes ==
- The 2002 CD reissue includes five bonus tracks: "Trois heures vingt", "Benjamin", "La voix du bon Dieu", "Trop jeune à dix-sept ans", and "Paul et Virginie".

== Release history ==
Release history
Region	Date	Label	Format	Catalog	Ref.
France	20 September 1983	Pathé‑Marconi	Cassette; vinyl	1652334; 1652331	
France	4 April 2002	Sony Music	CD	SMM 5032582	
Switzerland	16 May 2008	Sony Music	CD	SMM 5032582	
