= C'est pour toi =

Studio album by Celine Dion
- Released: 27 August 1985
- Recorded: 1984–1985
- Studios: #1 (Boucherville); C.B.E. (Paris); Montmartre (Paris); PSM (Quebec City)
- Genre: Pop
- Length: 33:23
- Language: French
- Label: TBS
- Producers: Paul Baillargeon; Eddy Marnay; Rudi Pascal

Celine Dion chronology
Les oiseaux du bonheur (1984)	C'est pour toi (1985)	Céline Dion en concert (1985)

Singles from C'est pour toi
- 1. "C'est pour toi" Released: August 1985; 2. "C'est pour vivre" Released: October 1985

C'est pour toi (lit. 'It's for you') is the seventh studio album by Canadian singer Celine Dion. Released in Quebec, Canada on 27 August 1985 through TBS and distributed by Trans‑Canada Disques, the album includes songs written by Eddy Marnay, Paul Baillargeon, André Popp, Christian Loigerot, Thierry Geoffroy, François Orenn, and Peter Sipos. Production was handled by Marnay, Baillargeon, and Rudi Pascal. C'est pour toi became Dion's third consecutive album to top the Quebec albums chart, remaining at number one for 12 weeks.

== Background and conception ==
Between 1982 and 1984, Dion released three commercially successful albums. Tellement j'ai d'amour... (1982) reached number three in Quebec and was certified platinum in Canada, while Les chemins de ma maison (1983) and Mélanie (1984) both topped the chart and were certified gold. In early 1985, Dion embarked on her first concert tour, performing in 50 cities across Quebec, Ontario, and New Brunswick.

During breaks between concerts, Dion recorded C'est pour toi. The album, released on 27 August 1985, consists mainly of ballads. Five tracks written and produced by Eddy Marnay and Paul Baillargeon were recorded in Boucherville, Quebec, while the remaining five were recorded in Paris, France.

== Commercial performance ==
C'est pour toi reached number one on the Quebec albums chart and remained there for 12 consecutive weeks. The title track, released as the lead single, peaked at number three in Quebec and contributed to the album's visibility.

== Track listing ==
No.	Title	Writer(s)	Producer(s)	Length
1.	"C'est pour toi"	Eddy Marnay; François Orenn	Marnay; Rudi Pascal	3:56
2.	"Tu es là"	Marnay; Paul Baillargeon	Marnay; Baillargeon	2:43
3.	"Dis-moi si je t'aime"	Marnay; Baillargeon	Baillargeon	2:49
4.	"Elle"	Marnay; Baillargeon	Marnay; Baillargeon	2:45
5.	"Pour vous"	Marnay; Peter Sipos	Marnay; Baillargeon	3:12
6.	"Les oiseaux du bonheur"	Marnay; André Popp	Marnay; Pascal	3:33
7.	"Avec toi"	Marnay; Christian Loigerot; Thierry Geoffroy	Marnay; Pascal	3:23
8.	"Amoureuse"	Marnay; Baillargeon	Baillargeon	3:14
9.	"Virginie... Roman d'amour"	Marnay; Loigerot; Geoffroy	Marnay; Pascal	3:46
10.	"C'est pour vivre"	Marnay; Popp	Marnay; Pascal	4:02
Total length:				33:23

== Charts ==
Chart performance
Chart (1985)	Peak position
Quebec Albums (ADISQ)	1

== Release history ==
Release history
Region	Date	Label	Format	Catalog	Ref.
Canada	27 August 1985	TBS	Cassette; vinyl	TBS4‑503; TBS 503	
