= La voix du bon Dieu (song) =

Single by Celine Dion

from the album La voix du bon Dieu
- Language: French
- B-side: "Autour de moi"
- Released: November 1981
- Studio: St-Charles (Longueuil)
- Genre: Pop
- Length: 3:16
- Label: Super Étoiles
- Songwriter: Eddy Marnay
- Producers: Eddy Marnay; René Angélil

Celine Dion singles chronology
"Ce n'était qu'un rêve" (1981)	"La voix du bon Dieu" (1981)	"L'amour viendra" (1982)

Audio
- "La voix du bon Dieu" on YouTube

"La voix du bon Dieu" (lit. 'Good Lord's voice') is the second single by Canadian singer Celine Dion, released in November 1981 in Quebec, Canada. It also serves as the title track of her debut album, La voix du bon Dieu. The song entered the Quebec chart on 28 November 1981, spending 13 weeks on the ranking and peaking at number 11. The single's B-side includes the track "Autour de moi".

== Background and release ==
The version of "La voix du bon Dieu" included on Dion's debut album contains generic backing vocals. A new arrangement was later created for her second album, Tellement j'ai d'amour..., which retained Dion's original 1981 vocal track but added harmonies performed by members of the Dion family. A third version was recorded for her 1984 French album Les oiseaux du bonheur, with a newly recorded vocal and a softer orchestral arrangement.

The second version of the song was subsequently included on Dion's 1986 compilation Les chansons en or and her 2005 French greatest hits album On ne change pas. The third version appeared on the 1997 compilation C'est pour vivre and on the 2002 French CD reissue of her debut album, released under the title Du soleil au cœur.

== Formats and track listing ==
- Canadian 7-inch single
1. "La voix du bon Dieu" – 3:16
2. "Autour de moi" – 2:58

== Charts ==
Chart performance
Chart (1981)	Peak position
Quebec (ADISQ)	11
