= These Are Special Times =

Studio album by Celine Dion
- Released: 30 October 1998
- Recorded: 1998
- Studios: Avatar, Clinton Recording, The Dream Factory, Nervious Music, Right Track Recording, WTM (New York City); Chartmaker, Enterprise Recorders, The Record Plant, Sony Sound Stage (Los Angeles); Cove City Sound (Glen Clove); Criteria (Miami); Crystal Cathedral (Garden Grove); Le Studio (Morin-Heights); The Warehouse (Vancouver)
- Genres: Christmas; pop; classical
- Length: 64:35
- Languages: English; French; Italian; Spanish
- Labels: Columbia; Epic
- Producers: Bryan Adams; David Foster; R. Kelly; Ric Wake

Celine Dion chronology
S'il suffisait d'aimer (1998)	These Are Special Times (1998)	Au cœur du stade (1999)

Singles from These Are Special Times
- 1. "I'm Your Angel" Released: 13 October 1998

These Are Special Times is the seventeenth studio album and sixth English‑language release by Canadian singer Celine Dion, and her first English‑language Christmas album. It was released in Europe on 30 October 1998 by Columbia Records and in the United States on 3 November 1998 by Epic Records. The album contains renditions of established Christmas songs as well as several original recordings, including "I'm Your Angel" and "The Prayer". Dion worked mainly with producers David Foster and Ric Wake, who were responsible for most of the album's production. These Are Special Times followed the commercial success of her earlier English‑language albums, Falling into You (1996) and Let's Talk About Love (1997).

Upon release, These Are Special Times received generally positive reviews from music critics, who praised Dion's vocal performance and the album's polished production. It has been certified six times platinum by the RIAA for shipments of six million copies in the United States. In Canada, it sold one million copies and was certified diamond by CRIA. With worldwide sales estimated at over 12 million copies, it is among the best‑selling Christmas albums.

Two singles were released from the album. "I'm Your Angel" was issued as the lead single on 16 November 1998 and reached number one on the US Billboard Hot 100. "The Prayer", a duet with Andrea Bocelli, was released as a promotional single on 1 March 1999 and won the Golden Globe Award for Best Original Song at the 56th Golden Globe Awards. Both "I'm Your Angel" and "The Prayer" were nominated for the Grammy Award for Best Pop Collaboration with Vocals at the 41st and 42nd Annual Grammy Awards, respectively. In 2021, Billboard ranked These Are Special Times as the eighth greatest holiday album of all time.

== Background ==
Dion released two French‑language Christmas albums early in her career: Céline Dion chante Noël (1981) and Chants et contes de Noël (1983). In 1993, she recorded "The Christmas Song" for David Foster's The Christmas Album. The following year, Dion appeared on Alvin and the Chipmunks' rendition of "Petit Papa Noël" for their album A Very Merry Chipmunk.

In 1996, she recorded "Brahms' Lullaby" for the charity compilation For Our Children Too, benefiting the Elizabeth Glaser Pediatric AIDS Foundation. Both "The Christmas Song" and "Brahms' Lullaby" were later included on These Are Special Times in 1998.

== Content ==
Dion worked on These Are Special Times with longtime collaborators David Foster and Ric Wake, who produced most of the album. It includes seven original songs: "Don't Save It All for Christmas Day" (co‑written by Dion; later recorded by Avalon in 2000 and Clay Aiken in 2004); "Another Year Has Gone By" (written and produced by Bryan Adams); a solo version of "The Magic of Christmas Day" (first recorded as a 1999 duet with Rosie O'Donnell for the charity album A Rosie Christmas); "The Prayer" (a duet with Andrea Bocelli, with each artist also recording a solo version for the 1998 Quest for Camelot soundtrack); "Christmas Eve"; "These Are the Special Times" (written by Diane Warren and later recorded by Christina Aguilera in 2000); and "I'm Your Angel" (a duet with R. Kelly, written and produced by Kelly).

The album also includes new arrangements of Christmas standards such as "O Holy Night", "Blue Christmas" (with Diana Krall on acoustic piano), "Adeste Fideles", and "Ave Maria", along with contemporary holiday songs like "Happy Xmas (War Is Over)" and "Feliz Navidad". On "Feliz Navidad" and "Les cloches du hameau", Dion is joined by members of her family.

In October 2007, These Are Special Times was reissued as a collector's edition, which included a DVD of Dion's CBS television special of the same name. In November 2022, the album was released as a 2‑LP limited edition opaque gold vinyl. Because of R. Kelly's legal issues, "I'm Your Angel" was removed from this edition and replaced with "I Met an Angel (On Christmas Day)", originally issued as the B‑side to Dion's 1999 single "That's the Way It Is". Digital editions of the album have also been updated to reflect this change.

== Promotion ==
Dion promoted These Are Special Times in the United States with a holiday television special that aired on CBS on 25 November 1998. The program included guest appearances by Andrea Bocelli, who joined Dion for a performance of "The Prayer", and Rosie O'Donnell, who performed with her on "Do You Hear What I Hear?". Dion also performed selections from the album ("O Holy Night", "These Are the Special Times"), several of her chart‑topping singles ("The Power of Love", "Because You Loved Me", "My Heart Will Go On"), and other well‑known songs ("Let's Talk About Love", "The First Time Ever I Saw Your Face").

The special drew strong viewership, ranking number one for the night and attracting an audience of more than sixteen million viewers. It later received two Emmy Award nominations.

Dion and Bocelli continued promoting "The Prayer" with high‑profile live performances at the 41st Grammy Awards on 24 February 1999 and at the 71st Academy Awards on 21 March 1999.

== Critical reception ==
Professional ratings
Review scores
Source	Rating
AllMusic	3/5 stars
Billboard (Paul Verna)	positive
Billboard (Chuck Taylor)	positive
Entertainment Weekly	B−
Yahoo Music UK	7/10

These Are Special Times received generally positive reviews from music critics. Paul Verna of Billboard praised Dion's vocal maturity and the album's polished production. He described the release as "a grade‑A effort" and "no ordinary holiday project," highlighting Dion's ease and creativity throughout the material. Verna singled out the "grandiose versions" of standards such as "O Holy Night" and "Adeste Fideles", the "modern classics" like "Happy Xmas (War Is Over)" and "Feliz Navidad", and the original songs including "Another Year Has Gone By" and "Don't Save It All for Christmas Day". He also praised "The Prayer", calling Dion's duet with Andrea Bocelli "gorgeous," and highlighted the "Phil Spector‑esque" "Christmas Eve" and Dion's "sparkling" interpretation of "Ave Maria".

Billboard critic Chuck Taylor also responded positively, particularly praising "I'm Your Angel", Dion's duet with R. Kelly. He described the track as "wonderfully restrained" and noted its "elegant, epic instrumental base," which includes sweeping strings, a soulful choir, and subtle percussion. Taylor highlighted the bridge as the song's emotional peak, where Dion and Kelly harmonize in a "gorgeous minor key". Reviewing "The Prayer," he called it "breathtaking," "ultra‑lush," and "one of Dion's most radiant performances," noting that the duet with Bocelli "will send a half‑dozen chills up your spine".

Stephen Thomas Erlewine of AllMusic wrote that "any fan of Dion, or of '90s adult contemporary pop in general, should find this album very enjoyable". Although he felt that the production could be "too slick" at times and that Dion's vocals occasionally sounded "mannered," he concluded that the album is "very effective" due to its strong material and Dion's commitment to the songs. Erlewine praised the album's balance of traditional carols ("Blue Christmas", "The Christmas Song", "Feliz Navidad"), original compositions ("I'm Your Angel", "Don't Save It All for Christmas Day"), hymns ("Adeste Fideles", "Ave Maria"), and spiritually themed pieces ("The Prayer", "O Holy Night"). Reviewers at Yahoo Music UK also responded favorably, awarding the album a score of 7 out of 10 and praising its strong song selection and Dion's consistently assured vocal performances.

== Commercial performance ==
By the end of 1998, These Are Special Times had sold six million copies worldwide, including 738,000 in Canada. It finished 1998 as the best‑selling holiday album of the year in both the United States and worldwide. To date, the album has sold over 12 million copies globally, making it the second best‑selling holiday album by a female artist in history.

=== United States ===
These Are Special Times debuted at number four on the US Billboard 200 with first‑week sales of 126,000 copies. The following week, it rose to number three with sales of 163,000 units. In its third week, the album sold 210,000 copies but slipped to number five.

Sales increased significantly in week four after Dion's CBS television special aired, reaching 409,000 copies and returning the album to number three. One week later, it peaked at number two on the Billboard 200 with sales of 366,000 units. This matched the performance of Amy Grant's Home for Christmas (1992) as the highest‑charting holiday album by a female artist.

The album stayed at number two for a second week, selling 413,000 copies. In its seventh week, it reached its highest weekly sales with 462,000 copies while ranking at number three. Its final week inside the top ten saw sales of 461,000 copies, placing it at number five. The album also led the Top Holiday Albums chart for nine consecutive weeks.

With US sales of 2,684,000 copies in 1998, These Are Special Times was the year's best‑selling holiday album. It also became the fastest‑selling holiday album by a female artist in its release year. On 16 November 2008, it became the first holiday album by a female artist to surpass five million copies in Nielsen SoundScan history. It remains the highest‑selling Christmas album by an artist born outside the United States. As of November 2019, it is the fourth best‑selling Christmas album of the SoundScan era, with 5.6 million copies sold in the US. On 3 November 2022, the album was certified six times platinum by the RIAA for shipments of six million copies.

=== Rest of the world ===
In Canada and Quebec, These Are Special Times reached number one. It shipped one million copies and was certified diamond by the CRIA.

In Japan, the album peaked at number four and sold over 500,000 copies. It also performed well across Australasia and Europe, reaching the top ten in most markets and reaching number one in Switzerland and Norway.

=== Singles ===
"I'm Your Angel" was released as the album's lead single and became Dion's fourth number‑one on the US Billboard Hot 100. It topped the chart for six consecutive weeks. On 9 December 1998, the single was certified platinum by the RIAA for shipments of one million copies in the United States. It also charted strongly internationally, reaching number three in the United Kingdom.

In March 1999, "The Prayer" was sent to US adult contemporary radio stations, where it peaked at number twenty‑two on the Hot Adult Contemporary Tracks chart. Dion later recorded a live duet version with Josh Groban for her 2008 CBS special Celine Dion: That's Just the Woman in Me. Thanks to digital sales, the track entered the Billboard Hot 100 at number seventy.

== Accolades ==
These Are Special Times received several awards and industry recognitions. In 1999, it was honored with the Japan Gold Disc Award for International Pop Album of the Year. At the 56th Golden Globe Awards, Dion and Andrea Bocelli's duet "The Prayer" won the award for Best Original Song.

Both "I'm Your Angel" and "The Prayer" were nominated for Best Pop Collaboration with Vocals at the 41st and 42nd Grammy Awards, respectively. "The Prayer" also received a nomination for the Academy Award for Best Original Song at the 71st Academy Awards.

In 2017, 24/7 Wall St. ranked These Are Special Times as the eighth greatest holiday album of all time, noting its lasting popularity and cultural presence.

== Impact and legacy ==
These Are Special Times has remained a notable release within the holiday music genre. In 2020, while recording her version of "O Holy Night" for the album My Gift, Carrie Underwood mentioned Dion's interpretation as an influence, describing it as "so beautiful and big and classic".

Several songs from the album have been revisited by other performers. Christina Aguilera recorded "These Are the Special Times", and Patti Labelle performed a widely noted version of "Don't Save It All for Christmas Day".

Dion's recordings of holiday standards have also appeared in various rankings. Billboard included her version of "Feliz Navidad" among notable covers of the song, while Esquire placed her rendition of "Happy Xmas (War Is Over)" on its list of "The 65 Best Christmas Songs of All Time". Parade ranked "These Are the Special Times" at number 44 on its list of the "150 Best Christmas Songs of All Time".

MTV described the album as "one of the greatest Christmas albums to ever exist", and Billboard placed Dion's "O Holy Night" at number 68 on its list of the "100 Best Christmas Songs of All Time", describing it as a "bombastically earnest performance". It is the only version of the song included in the ranking.

=== Rankings ===
Publication	Accolade	Rank	Ref.
Prima	Top 10 Best Christmas Albums of All Time	N/A	
House Beautiful	The 20 Best Christmas Albums of All Time	9	
Inside Edition	The 10 Best Christmas Albums of All Time	8	
24/7 Wall St.	50 Best Holiday Albums of All Time	8	
Woman's Day	The 54 Best Christmas Albums	53	

== Track listing ==
No.	Title	Writer(s)	Producer(s)	Length
1.	"O Holy Night"	Traditional	David Foster	5:20
2.	"Don't Save It All for Christmas Day"	Peter Zizzo; Ric Wake; Celine Dion	Wake	4:38
3.	"Blue Christmas"	Jay Johnson; Bill Hayes	Foster	3:50
4.	"Another Year Has Gone By"	Bryan Adams; Eliot Kennedy	Adams	3:25
5.	"The Magic of Christmas Day (God Bless Us Everyone)"	Dee Snider	Wake	4:24
6.	"Ave Maria"	Franz Schubert	Foster	4:56
7.	"Adeste Fideles (O Come All Ye Faithful)"	Traditional	Foster	4:43
8.	"The Christmas Song (Chestnuts Roasting on an Open Fire)"	Mel Tormé; Robert Wells	Foster	4:14
9.	"The Prayer" (with Andrea Bocelli)	Carole Bayer Sager; Foster; Alberto Testa^{[a]}; Tony Renis^{[a]}	Foster; Renis^{[b]}; Bayer Sager^{[b]}	4:30
10.	"Brahms' Lullaby"	Johannes Brahms	Foster	3:34
11.	"Christmas Eve"	Maria Christensen; Curtis Frasca	Wake	4:16
12.	"These Are the Special Times"	Diane Warren	Foster	4:09
13.	"Happy Xmas (War Is Over)"	John Lennon; Yoko Ono	Wake	4:12
14.	"I'm Your Angel" (with R. Kelly)	Kelly	Kelly	5:31
15.	"Feliz Navidad"	José Feliciano	Wake; Humberto Gatica^{[c]}	3:41
16.	"Les cloches du hameau"	Brahms	Wake	3:12
Total length:				64:35

=== Notes ===
- ^{^a} indicates an Italian translation
- ^{^b} signifies a co-producer
- ^{^c} signifies an additional producer
- The Japanese edition also includes an instrumental version of "My Heart Will Go On".
- The 2007 collector's edition includes a bonus DVD containing the These Are Special Times television special.
- The 2020 revised edition replaces "I'm Your Angel" with "I Met an Angel (On Christmas Day)".

== Credits and personnel ==
Credits adapted from AllMusic.

- Bryan Adams – arranger, bass, composer, guitar, producer, string arrangements
- Tawatha Agee – background vocals
- Steve Amerson – background vocals
- Morgan Ames – background vocals
- Randy Andos – trombone
- Jane Barnett – background vocals
- David Barratt – production coordination
- Tony Black – programming
- Juan Bohorquez – assistant engineer, mixing assistant
- Dick Bolks – background vocals
- Alfred Bosco – assistant engineer
- Jeff Bova – programming
- Robert Bowker – background vocals
- Jimmy Bralower – drum programming
- Troy Bright – background vocals
- Martin Briley – background vocals
- Chris Brooke – assistant engineer
- Alexandra Brown – choir, chorus
- Bridgette Bryant – choir, chorus
- Sharon Bryant – background vocals
- Bob Buckley – conductor, string arrangements
- Amick Byram – background vocals
- Bob Cadway – engineer
- Richie Cannata – tenor saxophone
- Johnnie Carl – arranger
- Elin Carlson – background vocals
- Patrick Carroll – drum programming, bass guitar, percussion
- Carmen Carter – choir, chorus
- Lafayette Carthon Jr. – conductor, keyboards, background vocals
- Sue Ann Carwell – background vocals
- John Chiodini – guitar, electric guitar
- Maria Christensen – composer, background vocals
- Dennis Collins – background vocals
- Crystal Cathedral Choir – choir
- Barry Danielian – trumpet
- Donna Davidson – background vocals
- Nathan Dean – mixing assistant
- Russ DeSalvo – guitar
- John Doelp – executive producer
- Chuck Domanico – bass
- Terence Dover – engineer
- Felipe Elgueta – engineer, programming
- Gary Falcone – choir, chorus
- David Foster – arranger, composer, keyboards, piano, producer
- Bob Franceschini – alto saxophone
- Simon Franglen – synclavier
- Roger Freeland – background vocals
- Yvonne Gage – background vocals
- Humberto Gatica – engineer, mixing
- Ayuana George – background vocals
- Stephen George – programming
- Diva Gray – background vocals
- Nikki Gregoroff – background vocals
- Don Hachey – mixing assistant
- Andy Haller – assistant engineer
- Jeff Hamilton – drums
- Brian Harding – assistant engineer, mixing assistant
- Linda Harmon – background vocals
- Bill Harris – alto saxophone
- Don Harris – trumpet
- Dan Hetzel – engineer
- Loris Holland – conductor, keyboards, Hammond organ, vocal arrangement, background vocals
- Jimmy Hoyson – assistant engineer
- Ronn Huff – arranger
- Nancey Jackson – background vocals
- Bashiri Johnson – background vocals
- Tony Kadleck – trumpet
- Shane Keister – arranger, handbell arrangement, piano, synclavier
- Khris Kellow – background vocals
- R. Kelly – arranger, composer, performer, producer
- Rick Kerr – engineer
- Curtis King – background vocals
- Darlene Koldenhoven – background vocals
- Diana Krall – piano
- John Kurlander – engineer
- Rick Logan – background vocals
- Susie Stevens Logan – background vocals
- Lisa Lougheed – background vocals
- Jeremy Lubbock – arranger, string arrangements
- Vito Luprano – executive producer
- Johnny Mandel – orchestral arrangements
- Ethan Mates – mixing assistant
- Rob Mathes – conductor, orchestral arrangements
- Paulette McWilliams – background vocals
- Ozzie Melendez – trombone
- Chieli Minucci – guitar
- Cindy Mizelle – background vocals
- Robert Moe – background vocals
- Jeffrey Morrow – background vocals
- Rob Murphy – assistant engineer, mixing assistant
- Jake Ninan – assistant engineer
- Rafael Padilla – percussion
- Bobbi Page – choir, chorus
- Shawn Pelton – drums
- Randy Phillips – choir, chorus
- Louis Price – choir, chorus
- Tom Rainer – synthesizer
- Jeffrey Ramsey – choir, chorus
- Anthony Ransick – background vocals
- Dave Reitzas – engineer
- Cathy Richardson – background vocals
- John "J.R." Robinson – drums
- Robin Robinson – background vocals
- Stevie Robinson – background vocals
- Olle Romo – programming
- William Ross – arranger, orchestral arrangements
- Kamil Rustam – acoustic guitar
- Johnny Rutledge – background vocals
- Larry Salzman – guitar
- John Scarpulla – baritone saxophone
- Al Schmitt – engineer
- David Shackney – engineer
- Don Shelton – background vocals
- Marc Shulman – guitar
- Ira Siegel – guitar
- Steve Skinner – arranger, drum programming, keyboard programming
- Ramón Stagnaro – acoustic guitar
- Randy Staub – engineer
- Aya Takemura – mixing assistant
- Chris Taylor – guitar
- David Taylor – bass trombone
- Vaneese Thomas – background vocals
- Michael Thompson – electric guitar
- Fonzi Thornton – background vocals
- UB Tirado – mixing assistant
- Terry Trotter – piano
- Rob Trow – background vocals
- Eric Troyer – background vocals
- Carmen Twillie – choir, chorus, background vocals
- Vancouver Orchestra – strings
- Gary Van Pelt – engineer
- Jeff Vereb – mixing assistant
- Frank Vilardi – drums
- Ric Wake – arranger, composer, producer
- Joan Walton – background vocals
- Spencer Washington – background vocals
- John West – background vocals
- Phil Western – engineer, keyboards, programming, string arrangements
- Brenda White-King – background vocals
- George Whitty – engineer, keyboard arrangements, synthesizer arrangements
- Cheryl Wilson – background vocals
- Elisabeth Withers – background vocals
- Steven Wolf – drums
- Thomas R. Yezzi – engineer
- Peter Zizzo – arranger, bass programming, composer, drum programming, guitar, keyboard programming

== Charts ==
=== Weekly charts ===
Weekly chart performance
Chart (1998–2025)	Peak position
Australian Albums (ARIA)	6
Austrian Albums (Ö3 Austria)	2
Belgian Albums (Ultratop Flanders)	16
Belgian Albums (Ultratop Wallonia)	12
Canada Top Albums/CDs (RPM)	1
Canadian Albums (Billboard)	1
Danish Albums (Hitlisten)	6
Dutch Albums (Album Top 100)	3
European Albums (Music & Media)	3
Finnish Albums (Suomen virallinen lista)	4
French Albums (SNEP)	23
German Albums (Offizielle Top 100)	3
Greek Albums (IFPI)	1
Hungarian Albums (MAHASZ)	14
Icelandic Albums (Tónlist)	1
Italian Albums (FIMI)	7
Japanese Albums (Oricon)	4
Malaysian Albums (RIM)	6
New Zealand Albums (RMNZ)	4
Norwegian Albums (VG-lista)	1
Polish Albums (ZPAV)	20
Portuguese Albums (AFP)	179
Quebec (ADISQ)	1
Scottish Albums (Official Charts)	31
South Korean Albums (Circle)	84
Swedish Albums (Sverigetopplistan)	3
Swiss Albums (Schweizer Hitparade)	1
UK Albums (Official Charts)	20
US Billboard 200	2
US Top Holiday Albums (Billboard)	1
US Top Catalog Albums (Billboard)	1

=== Year-end charts ===
1998 year-end chart performance
Chart (1998)	Position
Australian Albums (ARIA)	45
Belgian Albums (Ultratop Flanders)	56
Belgian Albums (Ultratop Wallonia)	64
Canada Top Albums/CDs (RPM)	35
Canadian Albums (SoundScan)	11
Dutch Albums (Album Top 100)	85
German Albums (Offizielle Top 100)	91
Japanese Albums (Oricon)	80
New Zealand Albums (RMNZ)	35
Norwegian Christmas Period Albums (VG-lista)	3
Swedish Albums (Sverigetopplistan)	26
Swiss Albums (Schweizer Hitparade)	21
UK Albums (OCC)	60
US Top Holiday Albums (SoundScan)	1

1999 year-end chart performance
Chart (1999)	Position
Canada Top Albums/CDs (RPM)	68
Dutch Albums (Album Top 100)	80
US Billboard 200	23

2000 year-end chart performance
Chart (2000)	Position
Finnish Foreign Albums (Suomen virallinen lista)	70
US Top Catalog Albums (Billboard)	3

2001 year-end chart performance
Chart (2001)	Position
US Top Catalog Albums (Billboard)	24

2002 year-end chart performance
Chart (2002)	Position
US Top Catalog Albums (Billboard)	32

2003 year-end chart performance
Chart (2003)	Position
US Top Catalog Albums (Billboard)	36

2004 year-end chart performance
Chart (2004)	Position
US Top Catalog Albums (Billboard)	45

2008 year-end chart performance
Chart (2008)	Position
Swedish Albums (Sverigetopplistan)	98
US Top Catalog Albums (Billboard)	41

2012 year-end chart performance
Chart (2012)	Position
Swedish Albums (Sverigetopplistan)	87

2016 year-end chart performance
Chart (2016)	Position
US Top Catalog Albums (Billboard)	48

=== Decade-end charts ===
Decade-end chart performance
Chart (2000–2009)	Position
US Top Catalog Albums (Billboard)	17
US Top Holiday Albums (Billboard)	6

=== All-time charts ===
All-time chart performance
Chart	Position
Greatest of All Time Top Holiday Albums (Billboard)	8
Canadian Artists Albums (SoundScan)	10

== Certifications and sales ==
Certifications
Region	Certification	Certified units/sales
Australia (ARIA)	Platinum	70,000^{^}
Austria (IFPI Austria)	Platinum	50,000^{*}
Belgium (BRMA)	Platinum	50,000^{*}
Canada (Music Canada)	Diamond	1,000,000^{^}
Denmark (IFPI Danmark)	3× Platinum	60,000^{‡}
Finland (Musiikkituottajat)	Gold	44,678
Germany (BVMI)	Gold	250,000^{^}
Italy (FIMI)	Gold	25,000^{‡}
Japan (RIAJ)	2× Platinum	500,000
Netherlands (NVPI)	Gold	50,000^{^}
New Zealand (RMNZ)	2× Platinum	30,000^{^}
New Zealand (RMNZ) digital	Gold	7,500^{‡}
Norway (IFPI Norway)	2× Platinum	100,000^{*}
Sweden (GLF)	Platinum	80,000^{^}
Switzerland (IFPI Switzerland)	2× Platinum	100,000^{^}
United Kingdom (BPI)	Platinum	300,000^{*}
United States (RIAA)	6× Platinum	6,000,000^{‡}
Summaries
Europe (IFPI)	Platinum	1,000,000^{*}
Worldwide	—	12,000,000
^{*} Sales figures based on certification alone.^{^} Shipments figures based on certification alone.^{‡} Sales+streaming figures based on certification alone.

== Release history ==
Release history
Region	Date	Label	Format	Catalog	Edition	Ref.
Europe	30 October 1998	Columbia	CD; cassette	COL 492730 2	Standard	
Japan	31 October 1998	SMEJ	CD	ESCA-7390	Japanese bonus track	
United States	3 November 1998	Epic	CD; cassette	BK 69523	Standard	
Australia	6 November 1998	Columbia	CD; cassette	4926512	Standard	
Germany	28 September 2007	Sony Music	CD	82876 86057 2	Ihre schönsten Weihnachtslieder	
United States	2 October 2007	Legacy Recordings	CD/DVD	88697 15575 2	Collector's edition bonus DVD	
Europe	2 November 2007	Legacy Recordings	CD/DVD	88697 15575 2	Collector's edition bonus DVD	
Japan	21 November 2007	Legacy Recordings	CD/DVD	EICP-882〜EICP-883	Collector's edition bonus DVD	
Australia	8 December 2007	Legacy Recordings	CD/DVD	88697 15575 2	Collector's edition bonus DVD	
Various	12 October 2018	Columbia	LP	1 90758 63851 5	Standard	
Various	6 November 2020	Columbia	Digital; streaming		Revised	
Various	25 November 2022	Columbia	LP	1 9658703241	Revised	
Various	17 November 2023	Columbia	CD	1 9658792692	Revised	

== See also ==
- List of best-selling albums by women
- List of best-selling Christmas albums in the United States
- List of Billboard Top Holiday Albums number ones of the 2010s
- List of Diamond-certified albums in Canada
- List of number-one albums of 1998 (Canada)
