= Chants et contes de Noël =

Studio album by Celine Dion
- Released: 3 December 1983
- Recorded: 1981–1983
- Studios: Montmartre (Paris); St‑Charles (Longueuil)
- Genre: Christmas
- Length: 38:17
- Language: French
- Label: Saisons
- Producers: René Angélil; Eddy Marnay; Rudi Pascal; Anne Renée

Celine Dion chronology
Du soleil au cœur (1983)	Chants et contes de Noël (1983)	Mélanie (1984)

Singles from Chants et contes de Noël
- 1. "Un enfant" Released: December 1983

Chants et contes de Noël (lit. 'Christmas songs and tales') is the fifth studio album and second Christmas release by Canadian singer Celine Dion. Issued in Quebec on 3 December 1983 by Saisons and distributed by Trans‑Canada Disques, the album combines traditional holiday songs with spoken stories for children. It also includes "À quatre pas d'ici", a French adaptation of Bucks Fizz's UK number‑one single "The Land of Make Believe". Upon release, the album reached number 17 on the Quebec chart.

== Background and conception ==
Released only three months after Les chemins de ma maison, Chants et contes de Noël was developed as a family‑oriented holiday project. The cover photograph, showing Dion with her nephews and nieces, reinforces the album's character. The collection includes three narrated stories — "Pourquoi je crois encore au Père Noël", "Céline et Pinotte", and "Le conte de Karine" — along with three Christmas songs previously issued on Céline Dion chante Noël (1981): "Promenade en traîneau", "Joyeux Noël", and "Glory Alleluia". Additional selections include Jacques Brel's "Un enfant" and the pop‑oriented "À quatre pas d'ici".

== Track listing ==
No.	Title	Writer(s)	Producer(s)	Length
1.	"Un enfant"	Jacques Brel; Gérard Jouannest	René Angélil	2:57
2.	"Promenade en traîneau"	Leroy Anderson; Mitchell Parish	Angélil	2:53
3.	"Pourquoi je crois encore au Père Noël" (conte)	Yvan Ducharme; Alain Noreau	Anne Renée; Angélil	5:44
4.	"Joyeux Noël"	Mel Tormé; Robert Wells	Angélil	2:38
5.	"Céline et Pinotte" (conte)	Ducharme; Noreau	Renée; Angélil	6:14
6.	"À quatre pas d'ici"	Eddy Marnay; Andy Hill; Peter Sinfield	Marnay; Rudi Pascal	3:58
7.	"Le conte de Karine" (conte)	Ducharme; Noreau	Renée; Angélil	10:18
8.	"Glory Alleluia"	André Pascal	Angélil	3:35
Total length:				38:17

== Notes ==
- "Promenade en traîneau", "Joyeux Noël", and "Glory Alleluia" were originally released on Céline Dion chante Noël (1981).

== Charts ==
Chart performance
Chart (1983)	Peak position
Quebec Albums (ADISQ)	17

== Release history ==
Release history
Region	Date	Label	Format	Catalog	Ref.
Canada	3 December 1983	Saisons	Cassette; vinyl	SNS 490002; SNS 90002	
