= Please Don't Sympathise =

1982 song by Sheena Easton

"Please Don't Sympathise" is a song by Scottish singer Sheena Easton, recorded for her 1982 album Madness, Money & Music. It was written by Steve Thompson and produced by Christopher Neil. In 1983, Canadian singer Celine Dion recorded a French-language adaptation titled "Ne me plaignez pas" for her album Les chemins de ma maison, and it was later released as a single in 1984.

== Celine Dion version ==
"Ne me plaignez pas"

Single by Celine Dion

from the album Les chemins de ma maison
- Language: French
- B-side: "Vivre et donner"
- Released: April 1984
- Studio: St-Charles (Longueuil)
- Genre: Pop
- Length: 3:00
- Label: Saisons
- Songwriters: Eddy Marnay; Steve Thompson
- Producer: René Angélil

Celine Dion singles chronology
"Un enfant" (1983)	"Ne me plaignez pas" (1984)	"Une colombe" (1984)

Audio
- "Ne me plaignez pas" on YouTube

"Ne me plaignez pas" (lit. 'Don't pity me') is the French-language adaptation of "Please Don't Sympathise", recorded by Canadian singer Celine Dion for her 1983 album Les chemins de ma maison. The French lyrics were written by Eddy Marnay, and the track was produced by René Angélil. Dion also recorded an extended version, which appeared on her 1983 compilation Du soleil au cœur.

In April 1984, "Ne me plaignez pas" was released as the second single from Les chemins de ma maison in Quebec, Canada. On 14 April 1984, it entered the Quebec chart, where it spent eight weeks and reached number 11.

=== Formats and track listing ===
- Canadian 7-inch single
1. "Ne me plaignez pas" – 3:00
2. "Vivre et donner" – 2:28

=== Charts ===
Chart performance
Chart (1984)	Peak position
Quebec (ADISQ)	11
