= Mon ami m'a quittée =

Single by Celine Dion

from the album Les chemins de ma maison
- Language: French
- B-side: "Et puis un jour"
- Released: September 1983
- Studio: St-Charles (Longueuil)
- Genre: Pop
- Length: 3:00
- Label: Saisons; Pathé-Marconi
- Songwriters: Eddy Marnay; Christian Loigerot; Thierry Geoffroy
- Producers: Eddy Marnay; Rudi Pascal

Celine Dion singles chronology
"D'amour ou d'amitié" (1982)	"Mon ami m'a quittée" (1983)	"Un enfant" (1983)

Audio
- "Mon ami m'a quittée" on YouTube

Mon ami m'a quittée (lit. 'My friend left me') is the first single from Celine Dion's album Les chemins de ma maison. It was issued in September 1983 in Quebec, Canada, and in November 1983 in France. The song achieved considerable success in Quebec. On 8 October 1983 it entered the singles chart and reached number one for nine weeks. It remained on the chart for 24 weeks in total. Dion also received two Félix Awards the following year.

"Mon ami m'a quittée" was later issued as a single in France to support Dion's first album released there, Du soleil au cœur. A music video was produced in 1984 for the Sur les chemins de ma maison television special. Dion also recorded a German-language version titled "Mon ami, geh nicht fort". It appeared as the B-side of the "Was bedeute ich dir" single, released in Germany in 1984.

The song was issued again in the Netherlands in 1997 by BR Music to promote the compilation C'est pour toi. In 2005 it was included on Dion's official French compilation album On ne change pas.

== Formats and track listing ==
- Canadian 7-inch single
1. "Mon ami m'a quittée" – 3:00
2. "Et puis un jour" – 3:12
- French 7-inch single
1. "Mon ami m'a quittée" – 3:00
2. "La dodo la do" – 3:00
- French 12-inch single
1. "Mon ami m'a quittée" – 3:00
2. "Ne me plaignez pas" – 3:46
- 1997 Dutch CD single
1. "Mon ami m'a quittée" – 3:00
2. "Hymne à l'amitié" – 3:59

== Charts ==
Chart performance
Chart (1983)	Peak position
Quebec (ADISQ)	1
