= À l'Olympia (Celine Dion album) =

Live album by Celine Dion
- Released: 21 November 1994
- Recorded: 28–29 September 1994
- Venue: Olympia (Paris)
- Genre: Pop
- Length: 68:13
- Languages: French; English
- Labels: Columbia; Epic

Celine Dion chronology
The Colour of My Love (1993)	À l'Olympia (1994)	D'eux (1995)

Singles from À l'Olympia
- 1. "Calling You" Released: December 1994

À l'Olympia (lit. 'At the Olympia') is the second live album by Canadian singer Celine Dion, released on 21 November 1994 by Columbia Records and Epic Records. Recorded during two sold‑out concerts at the historic Paris Olympia, the album documents Dion at a key stage in her expanding international career, combining her established French‑language repertoire with several of her most widely known English‑language songs. The setlist draws heavily from Dion chante Plamondon (1991) and includes live versions of "The Power of Love", "Where Does My Heart Beat Now", "Love Can Move Mountains", and the Academy Award‑nominated "Calling You".

À l'Olympia received positive critical reception for its arrangements and for presenting Dion's vocal work in a live context. Commercially, it performed strongly in Francophone markets, selling over one million copies in Europe and earning a platinum certification from the IFPI. It also achieved platinum status in both Canada and France, supporting Dion's growing visibility across international pop and adult contemporary audiences.

== Content ==
I had been waiting for this moment for a long time, for 10 years in fact... when I was 16 I came to sing three songs as the opening act on this stage; it was my dream which finally came true.

— Celine Dion, on performing at the Paris Olympia for the first time

The album was recorded on 28 and 29 September 1994 during two sold‑out concerts at the historic Paris Olympia. In addition to selections from Dion chante Plamondon, the setlist included Dion's rendition of the Academy Award‑nominated "Calling You" from Bagdad Café, a cover of Jacques Brel's "Quand on n'a que l'amour", and a medley from the rock opera Starmania. The medley includes two songs not previously recorded by Dion: "Quand on arrive en ville" and "Naziland, ce soir on danse", the latter of which she had earlier recorded in English as "Tonight We Dance (Extravagance!)" for the 1992 compilation Tycoon.

Although À l'Olympia was not released in several major music markets—including the United States, the United Kingdom, Japan, and Australia—tracks from the album appeared as B‑sides on various English‑language singles issued in 1995 and 1996. A video release of the concert has not been issued.

"Quand on n'a que l'amour", "Elle", and the "Medley Starmania" were later included on Dion's 2005 French‑language compilation On ne change pas. The Olympia concerts formed part of The Colour of My Love Tour.

== Critical reception ==
Professional ratings
Review scores
Source	Rating
AllMusic	3/5 stars
RPM	positive

À l'Olympia received generally positive commentary from critics. In his review for AllMusic, José F. Promis praised the quality of Dion's live vocals and the overall sound of the performance. Promis wrote that the album presents Dion shortly after achieving her first US number‑one single, "The Power of Love", and noted the setlist's mix of early English‑language hits—such as "Where Does My Heart Beat Now" and "Love Can Move Mountains"—alongside selections from Dion chante Plamondon. He also mentioned tracks like "Des mots qui sonnent", "Le blues du businessman", and "Ziggy" for their energetic live arrangements, and observed that the inclusion of two songs unique to this release, "Elle" and "Calling You", may appeal to collectors.

Ron Rogers of RPM wrote that À l'Olympia is aimed at Dion's "massive francophone audience", as 10 of the 14 tracks are in French. He added, however, that English-speaking listeners should not overlook the album, noting that Dion is a "once-in-a-lifetime voice", and that her "stunning singing ability" makes the material engaging regardless of the language.

== Commercial performance ==
À l'Olympia achieved solid commercial results in Francophone markets and became one of Dion's most successful live albums of the 1990s. The album sold one million copies in Europe and was certified platinum by the IFPI. Its strong performance in France and Belgium was supported by Dion's rising popularity in the region following the success of Dion chante Plamondon and her increasing visibility on European television and radio.

In Canada, the album sold 200,000 copies and was certified platinum by the CRIA. The album also received a platinum certification in France, reflecting Dion's growing status as a major francophone singer.

Chart-wise, À l'Olympia peaked at number three in Quebec, number 10 in France, and number 31 in Canada—where Quebec sales were not included in the national chart at the time. On the Belgian Wallonia chart, available only from April 1995 onward, the album reached number 19. In Switzerland, it also charted modestly, supported by Dion's expanding francophone audience and the success of her earlier studio releases.

The album's commercial momentum was strengthened by Dion's well‑received live performances at the Olympia in Paris, a venue closely associated with major francophone artists. The release contributed to her growing international profile shortly before the global breakthrough of The Colour of My Love (1993).

== Track listing ==
No.	Title	Writer(s)	Length
1.	"Des mots qui sonnent"	Luc Plamondon; Aldo Nova; Marty Simon	4:15
2.	"Where Does My Heart Beat Now"	Robert White Johnson; Taylor Rhodes	8:16
3.	"L'amour existe encore"	Plamondon; Riccardo Cocciante	4:18
4.	"Je danse dans ma tête"	Plamondon; Romano Musumarra	4:27
5.	"Calling You"	Bob Telson	6:41
6.	"Elle"	Eddy Marnay; Paul Baillargeon	3:12
7.	"Medley Starmania": "Quand on arrive en ville"; "Les uns contre les autres"; "Le monde est stone"; "Naziland, ce soir on danse"	Plamondon; Michel Berger	6:33
8.	"Le blues du businessman"	Plamondon; Berger	7:04
9.	"Le fils de Superman"	Plamondon; Germain Gauthier	4:28
10.	"Love Can Move Mountains"	Diane Warren	5:25
11.	"Un garçon pas comme les autres (Ziggy)"	Plamondon; Berger	3:19
12.	"The Power of Love"	Gunther Mende; Candy DeRouge; Jennifer Rush; Mary Susan Applegate	6:08
13.	"Quand on n'a que l'amour"	Jacques Brel	4:07
Total length:			68:13

== Charts ==
=== Weekly charts ===
Weekly chart performance
Chart (1994–1995)	Peak position
Belgian Albums (Ultratop Flanders)	96
Belgian Albums (Ultratop Wallonia)	19
Canada Top Albums/CDs (RPM)	52
Canadian Albums (The Record)	31
European Albums (Music & Media)	60
French Albums (SNEP)	10
Quebec (ADISQ)	3

=== Year-end charts ===
Year-end chart performance
Chart (1995)	Position
Belgian Albums (Ultratop Wallonia)	43
Belgian Francophone Albums (Ultratop Wallonia)	17
French Albums (SNEP)	35

== Certifications and sales ==
Certifications
Region	Certification	Certified units/sales
Canada (Music Canada)	Platinum	200,000
France (SNEP)	Platinum	300,000^{*}
Summaries
Europe (IFPI)	Platinum	1,000,000^{*}
^{*} Sales figures based on certification alone.

== Release history ==
Release history
Region	Date	Label	Format	Catalog
France, Switzerland	21 November 1994	Columbia	CD; cassette	478161
Canada	22 November 1994	Columbia	CD; cassette	80212
