= D'amour ou d'amitié =

Single by Celine Dion

from the album Tellement j'ai d'amour...
- Language: French
- B-side: "Le vieux monsieur de la rue Royale"
- Released: December 1982
- Recorded: July 1982
- Studio: Family Sound (Paris)
- Genre: Pop
- Length: 3:59
- Label: Saisons; Pathé-Marconi
- Songwriters: Eddy Marnay; Jean-Pierre Lang; Roland Vincent
- Producers: Eddy Marnay; Rudi Pascal

Celine Dion singles chronology
"Tellement j'ai d'amour pour toi" (1982)	"D'amour ou d'amitié" (1982)	"Mon ami m'a quittée" (1983)

Audio
- "D'amour ou d'amitié" on YouTube

"D'amour ou d'amitié" (lit. 'Of love or friendship') is a song by Canadian singer Celine Dion, recorded for her French-language album Tellement j'ai d'amour... (1982). Written by lyricist Eddy Marnay and French composers Jean-Pierre Lang and Roland Vincent, it was released as a single in France in December 1982 and in Quebec, Canada, in May 1983. The song became a commercial success, reaching number one in Quebec and the top 10 in France. It was certified gold in both countries, making Dion the first Canadian artist to earn a gold certification in France. In 2005, "D'amour ou d'amitié" was included on her greatest hits album On ne change pas.

== Background and release ==
In 1982, Eddy Marnay wrote lyrics for a melody composed by Jean-Pierre Lang and Roland Vincent, creating "D'amour ou d'amitié". The song deals with the transition from friendship to romantic interest. It was recorded at Family Sound Studio in Paris in July 1982 and produced by Marnay, with assistance from Rudi Pascal. Pathé-Marconi released it as a 7-inch single in France in December 1982, with "Visa pour les beaux jours" as the B-side.

In January 1983, Dion represented Canada as revelation of the year at Midem in Cannes. She performed "D'amour ou d'amitié" for an audience of 3,500 music professionals. Shortly after, the French radio station RTL selected the song as their favorite and played it frequently. Other stations soon followed. Dion also performed the song on Michel Drucker's television show Champs-Élysées. In April 1983, Pathé-Marconi issued a 12-inch maxi-single with additional tracks. In May 1983, a 7-inch single was released in Quebec by Saisons. It was the second single from Tellement j'ai d'amour..., following "Tellement j'ai d'amour pour toi". In early 1984, a German-language version titled "Was bedeute ich dir" was released in Germany. Its B-side included "Mon ami, geh nicht fort", a German version of "Mon ami m'a quittée".

== Commercial performance ==
"D'amour ou d'amitié" became Dion's first major commercial breakthrough. In France, it reached number five in the summer of 1983 and was certified gold on 1 September 1983 for sales of 500,000 copies. By the end of the year, sales exceeded 700,000. Dion became the first Canadian artist to receive a gold certification in France. Following this success, she released her first album in France, Du soleil au cœur, in September 1983.

In Quebec, the song entered the chart on 7 May 1983 and reached number one for four consecutive weeks in July and August. It spent 40 weeks on the chart and was certified gold in April 1985 for sales exceeding 50,000 copies.

== Accolades ==
Thanks to "D'amour ou d'amitié", Dion won the Félix Award for Artist of the Year Achieving the Most Success Outside Quebec.

== Formats and track listing ==
- Canadian 7-inch single
1. "D'amour ou d'amitié" – 3:59
2. "Le vieux monsieur de la rue Royale" – 4:10
- French 7-inch single
1. "D'amour ou d'amitié" – 3:55
2. "Visa pour les beaux jours" – 3:22
- French 12-inch maxi-single
1. "D'amour ou d'amitié" – 3:55
2. "Visa pour les beaux jours" – 3:22
3. "Ce n'était qu'un rêve" – 3:47
4. "L'amour viendra" – 4:20
- German 7-inch single
1. "Was bedeute ich dir" – 3:55
2. "Mon ami, geh nicht fort" – 2:58

== Charts ==
=== Weekly charts ===
Weekly chart performance
Chart (1983)	Peak position
France (SNEP)	5
Quebec (ADISQ)	1

=== Decade-end charts ===
Decade-end chart performance
Chart (1980–1989)	Position
France (SNEP)	183

== Certifications and sales ==
Certifications
Region	Certification	Certified units/sales
Canada (Music Canada)	Gold	50,000^{^}
France (SNEP)	Gold	700,000
^{^} Shipments figures based on certification alone.

== Release history ==
Release history
Country	Date	Format	Label	Ref.
France	December 1982	7-inch	Pathé-Marconi	
France	April 1983	12-inch	Pathé-Marconi	
Canada	May 1983	7-inch	Saisons	
Germany	1984	7-inch	Electrola	
