= Tellement j'ai d'amour pour toi =

Single by Celine Dion

from the album Tellement j'ai d'amour...
- Language: French
- B-side: "Écoutez-moi"
- Released: December 1982
- Studio: St-Charles (Longueuil)
- Genre: Pop
- Length: 2:56
- Label: Saisons
- Songwriters: Eddy Marnay; Hubert Giraud
- Producers: Eddy Marnay; Rudi Pascal

Celine Dion singles chronology
"L'amour viendra" (1982)	"Tellement j'ai d'amour pour toi" (1982)	"D'amour ou d'amitié" (1982)

Audio
- "Tellement j'ai d'amour pour toi" on YouTube

"Tellement j'ai d'amour pour toi" (lit. 'I have so much love for you') is the lead single from Canadian singer Celine Dion's second studio album, Tellement j'ai d'amour.... It was released in December 1982 in Quebec, Canada.

== Background and release ==
On 31 October 1982, Dion won the Outstanding Song Award at the World Popular Song Festival in Tokyo, Japan, where she also received the Yamaha Symphony Orchestra Award for Best Artist. She performed "Tellement j'ai d'amour pour toi" before an estimated television audience of 115 million and a live audience of 12,000. The festival included 1,907 contestants, with 30 entries advancing to the final round.

In 1983, Dion received four Félix Awards, including Quebec Artist Achieving the Most Success Outside the Province of Quebec. "Tellement j'ai d'amour pour toi" became a commercial success in Quebec, entering the chart on 25 December 1982 and peaking at number three. It re-entered the chart on 22 October 1983, remaining there until 14 January 1984 and reaching number 17 during its second run. In total, the single spent 44 weeks on the Quebec chart.

The B-side of the single contains another album track, "Écoutez-moi", which was later included on Dion's 2005 French compilation On ne change pas.

== Formats and track listing ==
- Canadian 7-inch single
1. "Tellement j'ai d'amour pour toi" – 2:56
2. "Écoutez-moi" – 3:03

== Charts ==
Chart performance
Chart (1982–1983)	Peak position
Quebec (ADISQ)	3
