= Les chemins de ma maison =

Studio album by Celine Dion
- Released: 7 September 1983
- Recorded: 1983
- Studios: Montmartre (Paris); St‑Charles (Longueuil)
- Genre: Pop
- Length: 33:09
- Language: French
- Label: Saisons
- Producers: René Angélil; Eddy Marnay; Rudi Pascal

Celine Dion chronology
Tellement j'ai d'amour... (1982)	Les chemins de ma maison (1983)	Du soleil au cœur (1983)

Singles from Les chemins de ma maison
- 1. "Mon ami m'a quittée" Released: September 1983; 2. "Ne me plaignez pas" Released: April 1984

Les chemins de ma maison (lit. 'The paths of my house') is the fourth studio album by Canadian singer Celine Dion. Released in Quebec, Canada on 7 September 1983 through Saisons and distributed by Trans‑Canada Disques, the album represented another stage in Dion's early career. Produced by René Angélil, Eddy Marnay, and Rudi Pascal, it became one of her most successful early releases, reaching number one on the Quebec albums chart for nine weeks and receiving a gold certification in Canada. At the 1984 Félix Awards, it was named Best Selling Album of the Year. Its lead single, "Mon ami m'a quittée", also reached number one in Quebec.

== Background and conception ==
Les chemins de ma maison includes 10 tracks. Five songs, produced by Eddy Marnay and Rudi Pascal, were recorded in Paris, France, while the remaining five, produced by René Angélil, were recorded in Longueuil, Canada. The album includes eight original songs and two covers: "Ne me plaignez pas", a French adaptation of Sheena Easton's 1982 track "Please Don't Sympathise", and "Mamy Blue", written by Hubert Giraud in 1970.

== Commercial performance ==
Les chemins de ma maison debuted at number one in Quebec and remained at the top for nine consecutive weeks. Its lead single, "Mon ami m'a quittée", also spent nine weeks at number one on the Quebec chart. On 1 November 1983, the album was certified gold by the CRIA, and total sales surpassed 100,000 copies.

== Accolades ==
On 28 October 1984, Les chemins de ma maison received the Félix Award for Best Selling Album of the Year and was also nominated for Pop Album of the Year. Dion was named Female Vocalist of the Year and received a nomination for Artist of the Year Achieving the Most Success Outside Quebec.

== Track listing ==
No.	Title	Writer(s)	Producer(s)	Length
1.	"Mon ami m'a quittée"	Eddy Marnay; Christian Loigerot; Thierry Geoffroy	Marnay; Rudi Pascal	3:00
2.	"Toi sur ta montagne"	Marnay; Alain Noreau	René Angélil	3:58
3.	"Ne me plaignez pas"	Marnay; Steve Thompson	Angélil	3:00
4.	"Vivre et donner"	Marnay; Ben Kaye	Angélil	2:28
5.	"Mamy Blue"	Hubert Giraud	Angélil	3:22
6.	"Du soleil au cœur"	Marnay; Jean-Claude Massoulier; André Popp	Marnay; Pascal	2:40
7.	"Et puis un jour"	Marnay; Noreau	Angélil	3:12
8.	"Hello Mister Sam"	Marnay; Loigerot; Geoffroy	Marnay; Pascal	4:12
9.	"La do do la do"	Marnay; Christian Gaubert	Marnay; Pascal	3:00
10.	"Les chemins de ma maison"	Marnay; Patrick Lemaître; Alain Bernard	Marnay; Pascal	4:17
Total length:				33:09

== Charts ==
Chart performance
Chart (1983)	Peak position
Quebec Albums (ADISQ)	1

== Certifications and sales ==
Certifications
Region	Certification	Certified units/sales
Canada (Music Canada)	Gold	100,000

== Release history ==
Release history
Region	Date	Label	Format	Catalog	Ref.
Canada	7 September 1983	Saisons	Cassette; vinyl	SNS4‑90001; SNS 90001	
