= Tellement j'ai d'amour... =

1982 album by Celine Dion

Studio album by Celine Dion
- Released: 7 September 1982
- Recorded: 1982
- Studios: Family Sound (Paris); St‑Charles (Longueuil)
- Genre: Pop
- Length: 30:52
- Language: French
- Label: Saisons
- Producers: René Angélil; François Cousineau; Eddy Marnay; Rudi Pascal

Celine Dion chronology
Céline Dion chante Noël (1981)	Tellement j'ai d'amour... (1982)	Les chemins de ma maison (1983)

Singles from Tellement j'ai d'amour...
- 1. "Tellement j'ai d'amour pour toi" Released: December 1982; 2. "D'amour ou d'amitié" Released: April 1983

Tellement j'ai d'amour... (lit. 'I have so much love...') is the third studio album by Canadian singer Celine Dion, released in Quebec, Canada on 7 September 1982 through Saisons and distributed by Trans‑Canada Disques. Produced by René Angélil, Eddy Marnay, Rudi Pascal, and François Cousineau, it became one of her early commercial successes, reaching number three on the Quebec albums chart and receiving platinum certification in Canada. At the 1983 Félix Awards, it won Best Pop Album of the Year. The album includes "D'amour ou d'amitié", Dion's first number‑one single in Quebec and her first top‑10 entry in France.

== Background and conception ==
Tellement j'ai d'amour... contains nine tracks. Three songs—"D'amour ou d'amitié", "Tellement j'ai d'amour pour toi", and "Visa pour les beaux jours"—were recorded in Paris, France, while the remaining tracks were recorded in Longueuil, Canada. The album also includes a new version of "La voix du bon Dieu", recorded with background vocals by the Dion family.

== Commercial performance ==
The album reached number three in Quebec and remained on the chart for 52 weeks. On 1 December 1983, it was certified platinum by the CRIA. Total sales exceeded 150,000 copies. The lead single, "Tellement j'ai d'amour pour toi", peaked at number three in Quebec. Its follow‑up, "D'amour ou d'amitié", topped the Quebec chart for four weeks and reached number five in France. Both singles were certified gold, and "D'amour ou d'amitié" made Dion the first Canadian artist to receive a gold certification in France.

== Accolades ==
On 31 October 1982, "Tellement j'ai d'amour pour toi" received the Outstanding Song Award at the World Popular Song Festival in Tokyo, Japan, and Dion received the Yamaha Symphony Orchestra Award for Best Artist. At the 1983 Félix Awards, Dion won four awards: Best Pop Album of the Year (Tellement j'ai d'amour...), Newcomer of the Year, Female Vocalist of the Year, and Artist of the Year Achieving the Most Success Outside Quebec.

== Track listing ==
No.	Title	Writer(s)	Producer(s)	Length
1.	"D'amour ou d'amitié"	Eddy Marnay; Jean-Pierre Lang; Roland Vincent	Marnay; Rudi Pascal	3:59
2.	"Le piano fantôme"	Luc Plamondon; François Cousineau	Cousineau; René Angélil	3:35
3.	"Tu restes avec moi"	Marnay; Cousineau	Cousineau; Angélil	3:23
4.	"Tellement j'ai d'amour pour toi"	Marnay; Hubert Giraud	Marnay; Pascal	2:56
5.	"Écoutez-moi"	Marnay; André Popp	Marnay; Angélil	3:03
6.	"Le tour du monde"	Marnay; Jean-Pierre Calvet	Marnay; Angélil	3:07
7.	"Visa pour les beaux jours"	Marnay; Christian Loigerot; Thierry Geoffroy	Marnay; Pascal	3:23
8.	"La voix du bon Dieu" (re-recording)	Marnay	Marnay; Angélil	3:16
9.	"Le vieux monsieur de la rue Royale"	Marnay; Alain Noreau	Marnay; Angélil	4:10
Total length:				30:52

== Notes ==
- The re-recorded "La voix du bon Dieu" features background vocals by the Dion family.

== Charts ==
Chart performance
Chart (1982)	Peak position
Quebec Albums (ADISQ)	3

== Certifications and sales ==
Certifications
Region	Certification	Certified units/sales
Canada (Music Canada)	Platinum	150,000

== Release history ==
Release history
Region	Date	Label	Format	Catalog	Ref.
Canada	7 September 1982	Saisons	Cassette; vinyl	SNS4‑80007; SNS 80007	
