= Céline Dion chante Noël =

Studio album by Celine Dion
- Released: 4 December 1981
- Recorded: 1981
- Studio: St‑Charles (Longueuil)
- Genre: Christmas
- Length: 27:45
- Language: French
- Label: Super Étoiles
- Producer: René Angélil

Celine Dion chronology
La voix du bon Dieu (1981)	Céline Dion chante Noël (1981)	Tellement j'ai d'amour... (1982)

Céline Dion chante Noël (lit. 'Celine Dion sings Christmas') is the second studio album and first Christmas album by Canadian singer Celine Dion. Released in Quebec, Canada on 4 December 1981 through Super Étoiles and distributed by Trans‑Canada Disques, the album contains French‑language versions of well‑known Christmas songs. It was produced by René Angélil.

== Background and conception ==
After the release of Dion's debut album La voix du bon Dieu in November 1981, her manager René Angélil chose to issue a second album only three weeks later. It presents French‑language adaptations of Christmas standards, including "Silent Night", "White Christmas", and "Santa Claus Is Comin' to Town". Recording took place at Studio St‑Charles in Longueuil, Canada, with Angélil supervising the sessions and choosing the material.

== Commercial performance ==
Together with La voix du bon Dieu, the two albums sold 30,000 copies by the end of 1981, and their combined sales reached 125,000 the following year.

== Track listing ==
All tracks were produced by René Angélil.

No.	Title	Writer(s)	Length
1.	"Glory Alleluia"	André Pascal	3:33
2.	"Le p'tit renne au nez rouge"	Johnny Marks; Jacques Larue	2:28
3.	"Petit Papa Noël"	Raymond Vincy; Henri Martinet	3:05
4.	"Sainte nuit"	Franz Xaver Gruber; Joseph Mohr	2:45
5.	"Les enfants oubliés"	Gilbert Bécaud; Louis Amade	3:12
6.	"Noël blanc"	Irving Berlin; Francis Blanche	2:45
7.	"Père Noël arrive ce soir"	John Frederick Coots; Haven Gillespie	1:57
8.	"J'ai vu maman embrasser le Père Noël"	Tommie Connor; Géo Koger; Loulou Gasté	2:30
9.	"Promenade en traîneau"	Leroy Anderson; Mitchell Parish	2:52
10.	"Joyeux Noël"	Mel Tormé; Robert Wells	2:38
Total length:			27:45

== Release history ==
Release history
Region	Date	Label	Format	Catalog	Ref.
Canada	4 December 1981	Super Étoiles	Cassette; vinyl	SPE4‑4102; SPE 4102	
