= Eddy Marnay =

French songwriter (1920–2003)

- Born: 18 December 1920; Algiers, Algeria
- Origin: French Algeria
- Died: 3 January 2003 (aged 82) Paris, France
- Genre: Various
- Occupations: Songwriter, singer
- Years active: 1940s–2003

Edmond Bacri (18 December 1920 – 3 January 2003), known professionally as Eddy Marnay, was a French songwriter. In his career, he wrote more than 4000 songs, including works for Édith Piaf, Frida Boccara and Céline Dion. He was joint winner, as lyricist, of the Eurovision Song Contest in 1969 for "Un Jour, Un Enfant", sung by Frida Boccara. He also wrote the title song for Charlie Chaplin's 1957 film A King in New York.

Céline Dion named one of her twin sons after him in 2010, as Marnay produced and helped write Dion's first five records.
