= Live à Paris (video) =

Video by Celine Dion
- Released: 8 November 1996
- Recorded: October 1995
- Venue: Le Zénith (Paris)
- Genre: Pop
- Length: 96:00
- Languages: French; English
- Labels: Columbia; Epic
- Director: Gérard Pullicino
- Producer: Vito Luprano

Celine Dion chronology
The Colour of My Love Concert (1995)	Live à Paris (1996)	...Live in Memphis 1997 (1998)

Professional ratings
Review scores
Source	Rating
AllMusic	2.5/5 stars

Live à Paris (lit. 'Live in Paris') is the third home video by Canadian singer Celine Dion. It was released on VHS on 8 November 1996 and on DVD on 17 November 2003 by Columbia Records and Epic Records. The concert was filmed at the Zénith Paris in October 1995 before an audience of more than 6,000 people during the D'eux Tour.

== Content ==
Live à Paris presents material from the French-language album D'eux, alongside several of Dion's English-language hits. Jean-Jacques Goldman appears on two songs, "Les derniers seront les premiers" and "J'irai où tu iras", reflecting his central role in the D'eux project.

A CD edition of the concert was issued on 22 October 1996, containing 14 of the 19 songs performed during the show.

== Commercial performance ==
The VHS edition was certified triple platinum in France for sales of 60,000 copies. The DVD reissue later earned a separate platinum certification for sales of 20,000 copies.

== Track listing ==
Standard edition
No.	Title	Writer(s)	Length
1.	"J'attendais"	Jean-Jacques Goldman	4:45
2.	"Destin"	Goldman	3:58
3.	"The Power of Love"	Gunther Mende; Candy DeRouge; Jennifer Rush; Mary Susan Applegate	4:16
4.	"L'amour existe encore"	Luc Plamondon; Riccardo Cocciante	4:09
5.	"Regarde-moi"	Goldman	3:37
6.	"River Deep, Mountain High" (VHS only)	Ellie Greenwich; Jeff Barry; Phil Spector	3:13
7.	"Un garçon pas comme les autres (Ziggy)"	Plamondon; Michel Berger	3:19
8.	"Misled"	Peter Zizzo; Jimmy Bralower	3:27
9.	"Love Can Move Mountains"	Diane Warren	4:02
10.	"Calling You"	Bob Telson	4:48
11.	"Le blues du businessman"	Plamondon; Berger	5:16
12.	"Les derniers seront les premiers" (with Jean-Jacques Goldman)	Goldman	3:25
13.	"J'irai où tu iras" (with Jean-Jacques Goldman)	Goldman	3:23
14.	"Je sais pas"	Goldman; J. Kapler	4:15
15.	"Le ballet"	Goldman	10:27
16.	"Prière païenne"	Goldman	4:44
17.	"Pour que tu m'aimes encore"	Goldman	4:19
18.	"Quand on n'a que l'amour"	Jacques Brel	3:44
19.	"Vole"	Goldman	3:06

DVD bonus features
No.	Title	Length
1.	"Behind the scenes"
2.	"Les derniers seront les premiers" (karaoke)
3.	"Photo gallery"

== Charts ==
=== Weekly charts ===
Weekly chart performance
Chart (1996–2016)	Peak position
Australian Music DVD (ARIA)	14
Belgian Music DVD (Ultratop Wallonia)	9
French Music DVD (SNEP)	7
UK Music Videos (Official Charts)	18

=== Year-end charts ===
Year-end chart performance
Chart (2004)	Position
Belgian Music DVD (Ultratop Wallonia)	45

== Certifications ==
Certifications
Region	Certification	Certified units/sales
VHS
France (SNEP)	3× Platinum	60,000^{*}
DVD
France (SNEP)	Platinum	20,000^{*}
^{*} Sales figures based on certification alone.

== Release history ==
Release history
Region	Date	Label	Format	Catalog
France	8 November 1996	Columbia	VHS	200704
France	8 November 1996	Columbia	LD	200704
Canada	19 November 1996	Epic	VHS	80251
Japan	22 January 1997	Epic	VHS	200704 2
Australia	February 1997	Epic	VHS	ESVU-151
France	17 November 2003	Columbia	DVD	2022829
