= List of awards and nominations received by Celine Dion =

Celine Dion awards and nominations
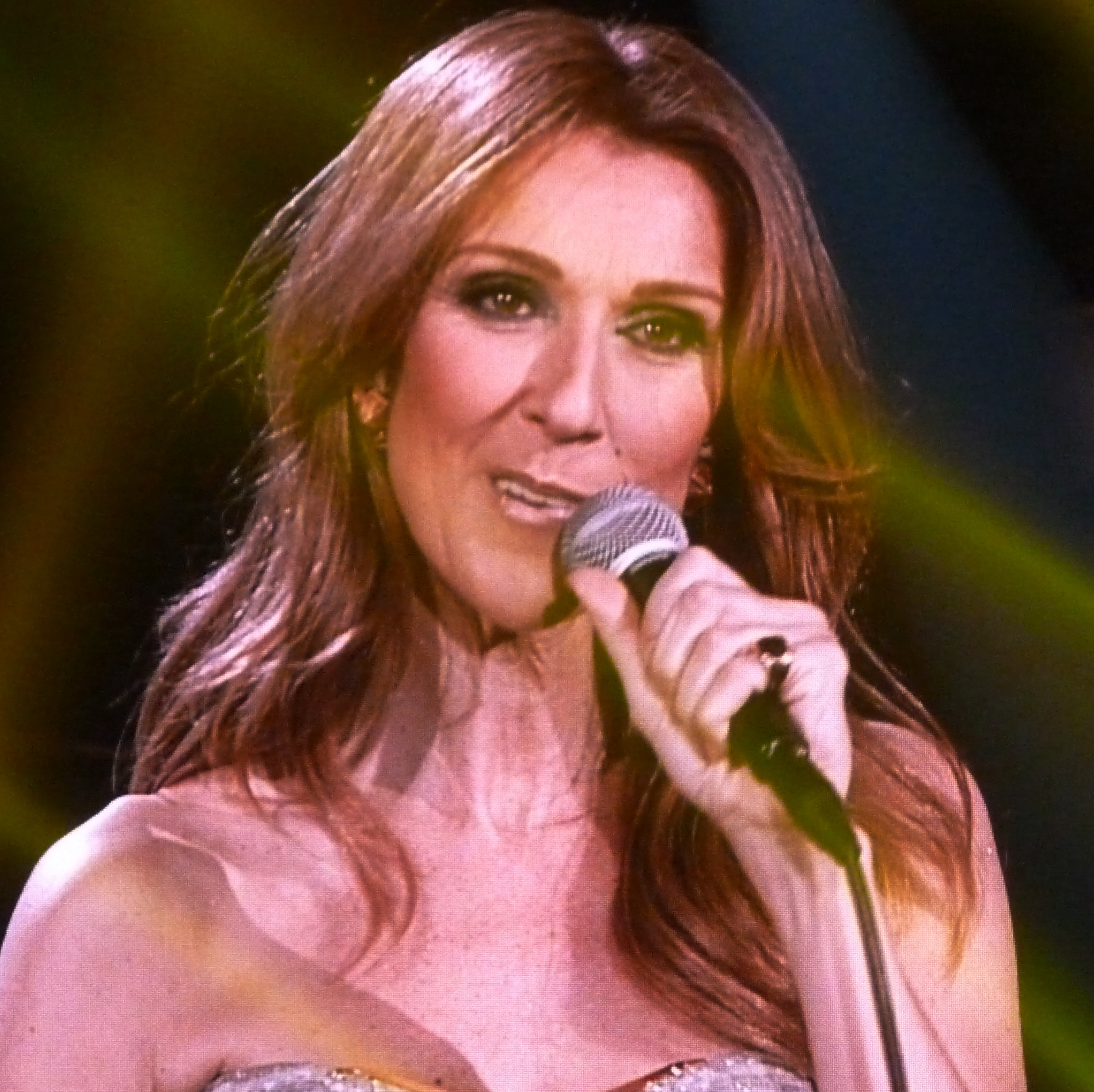
- Dion in 2013
Awards and nominations
Award	Wins	Nominations
American Music Awards	7	15
Amigo Awards	2	2
Billboard Music Awards	9	34
Echo Awards	1	4
Félix Awards	50	97
Grammy Awards	5	16
Guinness World Records	5	5
Japan Gold Disc Awards	8	8
Juno Awards	20	74
MTV Asia Awards	1	1
NRJ Music Awards	2	10
Victoires de la Musique	3	10
World Music Awards	12	12

Totals (Note: Certain award groups do not simply award one winner. They acknowledge several different recipients, have runners-up, and have third place. Since this is a specific recognition and is different from losing an award, runner-up mentions are considered wins in this award tally. For simplification and to avoid errors, each award in this list has been presumed to have had a prior nomination.)
- Wins: 228
- Nominations: 470

Celine Dion is a Canadian singer who has received numerous awards and nominations. At age twelve, she began her career as a Francophone artist in her home country and released her debut single "Ce n'était qu'un rêve" in 1981, a song she wrote with her mother Thérèse and brother Jacques. In 1982, she competed at the Yamaha World Popular Song Festival in Tokyo and won the musician's award for "Top Performer". The following year, she became the first Canadian to receive a Gold record in France for the single "D'amour ou d'amitié" and won her first Félix Award for Newcomer of the Year. Further success came when she won the Eurovision Song Contest in 1988, representing Switzerland.

Dion sought to expand her audience to the Anglophone market and released her English-language debut album, Unison (1990), winning the Juno Award for Album of the Year. Her profile increased following the 1991 Disney duet "Beauty and the Beast", which earned her a Record of the Year nomination and her first Grammy Award for Best Pop Performance by a Duo or Group, while her 1992 self-titled album was nominated for Best Female Pop Vocal Performance. Following this, The Colour of My Love was released in 1993 and won her second Juno Award for Album of the Year. Meanwhile, two of its singles, "When I Fall in Love" and "The Power of Love", were nominated for Best Pop Performance by a Duo or Group with Vocals and Best Female Pop Vocal Performance at the 36th and 37th Grammy Awards, respectively. Dion released D'eux in 1995; its success earned her the Ordre des Arts et des Lettres and established her as the best-selling French-language artist in history.

Dion then released Falling into You (1996) to critical acclaim and global success, winning the Grammy Award for Album of the Year and Best Pop Album. The album also garnered her several honors, including VH1's Artist of the Year, the Bambi Award for Top International Pop Star of the Year, and the World Music Award for World's Overall Best-Selling Recording Artist. In 1997, Dion recorded "My Heart Will Go On", the theme for the film Titanic and supported her follow-up album Let's Talk About Love. The song earned her Record of the Year and Best Female Pop Vocal Performance at the 41st Grammy Awards. Additionally, the album won her six Billboard Music Awards—including Top Billboard 200 Album Artist and Hot Adult Contemporary Artist—along with American Music Awards for Favorite Pop/Rock Female Artist and Favorite Adult Contemporary Artist, and the World Music Award for World's Best-Selling Pop Artist.

Her collaborations with artists, including "Tell Him" with Barbra Streisand, "I'm Your Angel", "The Prayer" with Andrea Bocelli, and "All the Way" with Frank Sinatra, were each nominated for the Grammy Award for Best Pop Collaboration with Vocals. Dion returned to music after a two-year hiatus with A New Day Has Come (2002) and One Heart (2003), winning consecutive American Music Awards for Favorite Adult Contemporary Artist. She received her first songwriting recognitions from the Society of Composers, Authors and Music Publishers of Canada (SOCAN) for her compositions for Marc Dupré in 2006 and 2012. Continuing this success, each of her subsequent studio album releases until her most recent, Courage (2019), received a nomination for the Juno Award for Album of the Year—extending her Guinness World Record to 75 total nominations in her career.

Dion was given the Chopard Diamond Award in 2004 as the best-selling female recording artist in history at that time. She was voted third in VH1's 100 Greatest Women in Music in 2002 while Consequence included her on their "100 Best Vocalists of All Time" list. In 2007, Falling into You was included on the Rock and Roll Hall of Fame's Definitive 200 list. Dion was also awarded the honorary Legion of Honor by President Nicolas Sarkozy in 2008 and was elevated to the Companion of the Order of Canada in 2013. She has received honorary doctorates from Université Laval (2008) and Berklee College of Music (2021).

== Awards and nominations ==
Awards and nominations received by Celine Dion
Award	Year	Category	Nominated work(s)	Result	Ref.
American Music Awards	1995	Favorite Pop/Rock Single	"The Power of Love"	Nominated	
American Music Awards	1997	Favorite Pop/Rock Female Artist	Herself	Nominated	
American Music Awards	1997	Favorite Adult Contemporary Artist	Herself	Nominated	
American Music Awards	1998	Favorite Pop/Rock Female Artist	Herself	Won	
American Music Awards	1998	Favorite Adult Contemporary Artist	Herself	Nominated	
American Music Awards	1999	Artist of the Year	Herself	Nominated	
American Music Awards	1999	Favorite Pop/Rock Female Artist	Herself	Won	
American Music Awards	1999	Favorite Adult Contemporary Artist	Herself	Won	
American Music Awards	1999	Favorite Pop/Rock Album	Lets Talk About Love	Nominated	
American Music Awards	2001	Favorite Pop/Rock Female Artist	Herself	Nominated	
American Music Awards	2001	Favorite Adult Contemporary Artist	Herself	Won	
American Music Awards	2003	Favorite Pop/Rock Female Artist	Herself	Nominated	
American Music Awards	2003	Favorite Adult Contemporary Artist	Herself	Won	
American Music Awards	2003	Favorite Pop/Rock Female Artist	Herself	Nominated	
American Music Awards	2003	Favorite Adult Contemporary Artist	Herself	Won	
Amigo Awards	1997	Best International Female Artist	Herself	Won	
Amigo Awards	1998	Best International Female Artist	Herself	Won	
Arion Music Awards	2003	Best Selling International Album	A New Day Has Come	Won	
Bambi Awards	1996	Top International Pop Star of the Year	Herself	Won	
Bambi Awards	1999	For Sales of Over 10 Million CDs in Germany, Austria and Switzerland	Herself	Won	
Bambi Awards	2012	In Recognition of the Long-Standing Musical Career	Herself	Won	
Banff Television Foundation Awards	2002	All-Time Famous Faces in Canadian Television	Herself	Won	
Best of Las Vegas Awards	2003	Best Overall Show	A New Day...	Won	
Best of Las Vegas Awards	2004	Best Singer	Herself	Won	
Best of Las Vegas Awards	2005	Best Headliner	Herself	Won	
Best of Las Vegas Awards	2006	Best Headliner	Herself	Won	
Best of Las Vegas Awards	2007	Best Singer	Herself	Won	
Best of Las Vegas Awards	2007	Best All Around Performer	Herself	Won	
Best of Las Vegas Awards	2007	Best Show Choreography	A New Day...	Won	
Best of Las Vegas Awards	2008	Best Singer	Herself	Won	
Best of Las Vegas Awards	2012	Best Overall Show	Celine	Won	
Best of Las Vegas Awards	2014	Best Overall Show	Celine	Won	
Best of Las Vegas Awards	2016	Best Singer	Herself	Won	
Best of Montreal Awards	1997	Most Desirable Woman	Herself	Nominated	
Billboard Music Awards	1992	Hot Adult Contemporary Artists	Herself	Nominated	
Billboard Music Awards	1992	Hot Adult Contemporary Singles & Tracks	"If You Asked Me To"	Nominated	
Billboard Music Awards	1994	Top Pop Artists - Female	Herself	Nominated	
Billboard Music Awards	1994	Top Billboard 200 Album Artists - Female	Herself	Nominated	
Billboard Music Awards	1994	Hot 100 Singles Artists - Female	Herself	Nominated	
Billboard Music Awards	1994	Hot Adult Contemporary Artists	Herself	Nominated	
Billboard Music Awards	1994	Hot 100 Singles	"The Power of Love"	Nominated	
Billboard Music Awards	1994	Hot Adult Contemporary Singles & Tracks	"The Power of Love"	Nominated	
Billboard Music Awards	1996	Top Pop Artists	Herself	Nominated	
Billboard Music Awards	1996	Top Pop Artists - Female	Herself	Nominated	
Billboard Music Awards	1996	Top Billboard 200 Album Artists	Herself	Nominated	
Billboard Music Awards	1996	Top Billboard 200 Album Artists - Female	Herself	Nominated	
Billboard Music Awards	1996	Hot 100 Singles Artists	Herself	Nominated	
Billboard Music Awards	1996	Hot 100 Singles Artists - Female	Herself	Nominated	
Billboard Music Awards	1996	Hot Adult Contemporary Artists	Herself	Nominated	
Billboard Music Awards	1996	Hot Adult Top 40 Artists	Herself	Nominated	
Billboard Music Awards	1996	Hot 100 Singles	"Because You Loved Me"	Nominated	
Billboard Music Awards	1996	Hot 100 Singles Airplay	"Because You Loved Me"	Nominated	
Billboard Music Awards	1996	Hot Adult Contemporary Singles & Tracks	"Because You Loved Me"	Nominated	
Billboard Music Awards	1996	Hot Adult Top 40 Singles & Tracks	"Because You Loved Me"	Nominated	
Billboard Music Awards	1996	Top Billboard 200 Albums	Falling into You	Nominated	
Billboard Music Awards	1998	Top Pop Artists - Female	Herself	Nominated	
Billboard Music Awards	1998	Top Billboard 200 Album Artists	Herself	Won	
Billboard Music Awards	1998	Top Billboard 200 Album Artists - Female	Herself	Won	
Billboard Music Awards	1998	Hot Adult Contemporary Artists	Herself	Won	
Billboard Music Awards	1998	Hot Adult Contemporary Singles & Tracks	"My Heart Will Go On"	Nominated	
Billboard Music Awards	1998	Hot Soundtrack Singles	"My Heart Will Go On"	Won	
Billboard Music Awards	1998	Top Billboard 200 Albums	Let's Talk About Love	Nominated	
Billboard Music Awards	1998	Top Billboard 200 Albums	Titanic: Music from the Motion Picture	Won	
Billboard Music Awards	1998	Hot Soundtrack Albums	Titanic: Music from the Motion Picture	Won	
Billboard Music Awards	1999	Top Billboard 200 Album Artists - Female	Herself	Nominated	
Billboard Music Awards	1999	Hot 100 Singles Sales	"I'm Your Angel"	Nominated	
Billboard Music Awards	2000	Top Pop Artists - Female	Herself	Nominated	
Billboard Music Awards	2000	Top Billboard 200 Artists - Female	Herself	Nominated	
Billboard Music Awards	2016	Icon Award	Herself	Won	
Billboard Latin Music Awards	2002	First English-Language Song to Top Hot Latin Tracks	"My Heart Will Go On"	Won	
Billboard Live Music Awards	2008	Top Boxscore	Celine Dion at the Bell Centre in Montreal	Nominated	
Blockbuster Entertainment Awards	1997	Favorite Female Artist - Pop	Herself	Nominated	
Blockbuster Entertainment Awards	1997	Favourite Song from a Movie	"Because You Loved Me"	Nominated	
Blockbuster Entertainment Awards	1999	Favourite Song from a Movie	"My Heart Will Go On"	Won	
Blockbuster Entertainment Awards	1999	Favorite Soundtrack	Titanic: Music from the Motion Picture	Nominated	
Blockbuster Entertainment Awards	2000	Favorite Female Artist - Pop	Herself	Nominated	
Blockbuster Entertainment Awards	2001	Favorite Female Artist - Pop	Herself	Nominated	
Bravo Otto Awards	1998	Gold Otto for Female Singer	Herself	Won	
Brit Awards	1996	Best International Female Artist	Herself	Nominated	
Brit Awards	1997	Best International Female Artist	Herself	Nominated	
Brit Awards	1998	Best International Female Artist	Herself	Nominated	
Canadian Arts and Fashion Awards	2018	International Style Icon Award	Herself	Won	
Canada's Walk of Fame	1999	Inducted into Canada's Walk of Fame	Herself	Won	
Canadian Radio Music Awards	2005	Fan's Choice Awards	Herself	Nominated	
Chérie FM Stars	2005	Honorary Award	Herself	Won	
Chérie FM Stars	2007	Honorary Award for the Entire Career	Herself	Won	
Chérie FM Stars	2007	Female Artist of the Year	Herself	Nominated	
Chérie FM Stars	2007	Album of the Year	D'elles	Nominated	
Chérie FM Stars	2007	French Song of the Year	"Et s'il n'en restait qu'une (je serais celle-là)"	Nominated	
Chicago Film Critics Association Awards	1998	Best Original Score^{[b]}	Titanic: Music from the Motion Picture	Won	
Coca-Cola Full Blast Music Awards	1997	Most Popular International Artist of 1996	Herself	Won	
CRIA Special Awards	1999	Best Selling Canadian Artist of the Century	Herself	Won	
Danish Music Awards	1997	Best International Female Singer	Herself	Nominated	
Danish Music Awards	1998	Best International Female Singer	Herself	Nominated	
Danish Music Awards	1999	Best International Female Singer	Herself	Nominated	
Danish Music Awards	1999	Best International Hit	"My Heart Will Go On"	Nominated	
Dragon Awards	2003	International Female Artist of the Year	Herself	Won	
Dragon Awards	2004	International Female Artist of the Year	Herself	Won	
Echo Awards	1997	International Female Artist of the Year	Herself	Nominated	
Echo Awards	1998	International Female Artist of the Year	Herself	Nominated	
Echo Awards	1999	International Female Artist of the Year	Herself	Won	
Echo Awards	2003	International Female Artist of the Year	Herself	Nominated	
Edison Awards	1995	Best Album	The Colour of My Love	Nominated	
Edison Awards	1998	Best International Female Singer	Herself	Nominated	
Edison Awards	1998	Single of the Year	"Tell Him" (with Barbra Streisand)	Nominated	
Ella Awards	2004	For Contribution to Music and Humanitarian and Community Support	Herself	Won	
Eurovision Song Contest	1988	First Prize	Herself	Won	
Félix Awards	1982	Newcomer of the Year	Herself	Nominated	
Félix Awards	1983	Newcomer of the Year	Herself	Won	
Félix Awards	1983	Artist of the Year Achieving the Most Success Outside Quebec	Herself	Won	
Félix Awards	1983	Female Vocalist of the Year	Herself	Won	
Félix Awards	1983	Pop Album of the Year	Tellement j'ai d'amour...	Won	
Félix Awards	1984	Artist of the Year Achieving the Most Success Outside Quebec	Herself	Nominated	
Félix Awards	1984	Female Vocalist of the Year	Herself	Won	
Félix Awards	1984	Pop Album of the Year	Les chemins de ma maison	Nominated	
Félix Awards	1984	Best Selling Album of the Year	Les chemins de ma maison	Won	
Félix Awards	1985	Artist of the Year Achieving the Most Success Outside Quebec - French Market	Herself	Nominated	
Félix Awards	1985	Female Vocalist of the Year	Herself	Won	
Félix Awards	1985	Song of the Year	"Une Colombe"	Won	
Félix Awards	1985	Best Selling Single of the Year	"Une Colombe"	Won	
Félix Awards	1985	Album of the Year	Melanie	Won	
Félix Awards	1985	Pop Album of the Year	Melanie	Nominated	
Félix Awards	1985	Best Selling Album of the Year	Melanie	Won	
Félix Awards	1985	Show of the Year - Music and Pop Songs	Céline Dion en concert	Nominated	
Félix Awards	1987	Female Vocalist of the Year	Herself	Nominated	
Félix Awards	1987	Video of the Year	"Fais ce que tu voudras"	Nominated	
Félix Awards	1987	Pop Album of the Year	Incognito	Nominated	
Félix Awards	1988	Artist of the Year Achieving the Most Success Outside Quebec - French Market	Herself	Won	
Félix Awards	1988	Female Vocalist of the Year	Herself	Won	
Félix Awards	1988	Most Popular Song of the Year	"Incognito"	Won	
Félix Awards	1988	Best Stage Performance of the Year	Incognito tournée	Won	
Félix Awards	1988	Show of the Year	Incognito tournée	Nominated	
Félix Awards	1990	Anglophone Artist of the Year	Herself	Won	
Félix Awards	1991	Artist of the Year Achieving the Most Success Outside Quebec	Herself	Nominated	
Félix Awards	1991	Artist of the Year Achieving the Most Success in a Language Other Than French	Herself	Won	
Félix Awards	1992	Artist of the Year Achieving the Most Success Outside Quebec	Herself	Nominated	
Félix Awards	1992	Artist of the Year Achieving the Most Success in a Language Other Than French	Herself	Won	
Félix Awards	1992	Female Vocalist of the Year	Herself	Nominated	
Félix Awards	1992	Pop/Rock Album of the Year	Dion Chante Plamondon	Nominated	
Félix Awards	1992	Best Selling Album of the Year	Dion Chante Plamondon	Won	
Félix Awards	1993	Artist of the Year Achieving the Most Success Outside Quebec	Herself	Won	
Félix Awards	1993	Artist of the Year Achieving the Most Success in a Language Other Than French	Herself	Won	
Félix Awards	1993	Female Vocalist of the Year	Herself	Nominated	
Félix Awards	1993	Most Popular Song of the Year	"Quelqu'un que j'aime, quelqu'un qui m'aime"	Nominated	
Félix Awards	1994	Artist of the Year Achieving the Most Success Outside Quebec	Herself	Won	
Félix Awards	1994	Artist of the Year Achieving the Most Success in a Language Other Than French	Herself	Won	
Félix Awards	1994	Female Vocalist of the Year	Herself	Won	
Félix Awards	1994	Video of the Year	"L'amour existe encore"	Nominated	
Félix Awards	1995	Artist of the Year Achieving the Most Success Outside Quebec	Herself	Won	
Félix Awards	1995	Artist of the Year Achieving the Most Success in a Language Other Than French	Herself	Nominated	
Félix Awards	1995	Female Vocalist of the Year	Herself	Nominated	
Félix Awards	1995	Most Popular Song of the Year	"Pour que tu m'aimes encore"	Won	
Félix Awards	1995	Video of the Year	"Pour que tu m'aimes encore"	Nominated	
Félix Awards	1995	Pop/Rock Album of the Year	D'eux	Won	
Félix Awards	1995	Best Selling Album of the Year	D'eux	Nominated	
Félix Awards	1996	Artist of the Year Achieving the Most Success Outside Quebec	Herself	Won	
Félix Awards	1996	Artist of the Year Achieving the Most Success in a Language Other Than French	Herself	Won	
Félix Awards	1996	Female Vocalist of the Year	Herself	Won	
Félix Awards	1996	Special Award	Herself	Won	
Félix Awards	1996	Most Popular Song of the Year	"Je sais pas"	Nominated	
Félix Awards	1996	Video of the Year	"Je sais pas"	Nominated	
Félix Awards	1996	Best Selling Album of the Year	D'eux	Won	
Félix Awards	1996	Show of the Year - Performer	D'eux Tour	Won	
Félix Awards	1997	Artist of the Year Achieving the Most Success Outside Quebec	Herself	Won	
Félix Awards	1997	Artist of the Year Achieving the Most Success in a Language Other Than French	Herself	Won	
Félix Awards	1997	Female Vocalist of the Year	Herself	Won	
Félix Awards	1997	Most Popular Song of the Year	"Les derniers seront les premiers"	Nominated	
Félix Awards	1997	Video of the Year	"Les derniers seront les premiers"	Nominated	
Félix Awards	1997	Pop/Rock Album of the Year	Live à Paris	Won	
Félix Awards	1997	Best Selling Album of the Year	Live à Paris	Won	
Félix Awards	1998	Artist of the Year Achieving the Most Success in a Language Other Than French	Herself	Nominated	
Félix Awards	1999	Artist of the Year Achieving the Most Success in a Language Other Than French	Herself	Won	
Félix Awards	2000	Artist of the Year Achieving the Most Success Outside Quebec	Herself	Nominated	
Félix Awards	2000	Female Vocalist of the Year	Herself	Nominated	
Félix Awards	2000	Show of the Year - Performer	Let's Talk About Love World Tour	Nominated	
Félix Awards	2002	Artist of the Year Achieving the Most Success Outside Quebec	Herself	Won	
Félix Awards	2002	Most Popular Song of the Year	"Sous le vent"	Nominated	
Félix Awards	2002	Video of the Year	"Sous le vent"	Nominated	
Félix Awards	2002	Television Show of the Year - Song	La Fureur - Spécial Céline Dion	Nominated	
Félix Awards	2003	Artist of the Year Achieving the Most Success in a Language Other Than French	Herself	Nominated	
Félix Awards	2003	Female Vocalist of the Year	Herself	Nominated	
Félix Awards	2004	Best Selling Album of the Year	1 fille & 4 types	Won	
Félix Awards	2004	Website of the Year	celinedion.com	Nominated	
Félix Awards	2005	Anglophone Album of the Year	A New Day... Live in Las Vegas	Nominated	
Félix Awards	2005	Anglophone Album of the Year	Miracle	Nominated	
Félix Awards	2006	Female Vocalist of the Year	Herself	Nominated	
Félix Awards	2006	Most Popular Song of the Year	"Je ne vous oublie pas"	Nominated	
Félix Awards	2007	Television Song of the Year - Song	Céline : 25 ans d'amour, 25 ans de télé	Nominated	
Félix Awards	2008	Honorary Award	Herself	Won	
Félix Awards	2009	Artist of the Year Achieving the Most Success Outside Quebec	Herself	Nominated	
Félix Awards	2009	DVD of the Year	Céline sur les Plaines	Won	
Félix Awards	2013	Artist of the Year Achieving the Most Success Outside Quebec	Herself	Nominated	
Félix Awards	2013	Female Vocalist of the Year	Herself	Nominated	
Félix Awards	2013	Most Popular Song of the Year	"Parler à mon père"	Nominated	
Félix Awards	2013	Adult Contemporary Album of the Year	Sans attendre	Won	
Félix Awards	2013	Best Selling Album of the Year	Sans attendre	Won	
Félix Awards	2013	Television Show of the Year - Music	Céline Dion... Sans attendre	Nominated	
Félix Awards	2014	Artist of the Year Achieving the Most Success Outside Quebec	Herself	Nominated	
Félix Awards	2014	Anglophone Album of the Year	Loved Me Back to Life	Nominated	
Félix Awards	2014	Television Show of the Year - Music	Céline... une seule fois	Nominated	
Félix Awards	2017	Female Vocalist of the Year	Herself	Nominated	
Félix Awards	2017	Adult Contemporary Album of the Year	Encore un soir	Won	
Félix Awards	2017	Best Selling Album of the Year	Encore un soir	Won	
Félix Awards	2017	Most Popular Song of the Year	"Encore un soir"	Nominated	
Félix Awards	2019	Song of the Year	"Tu trouveras la paix"	Nominated	
Félix Awards	2025	Song of the Year	"Hymne à l'amour"	Nominated	
Fifi Awards	2004	Women's Fragrance of the Year - Popular Appeal	Celine Dion Parfums	Won	
Fifi Awards	2006	Women's Fragrance of the Year - Popular Appeal	Celine Dion Belong	Nominated	
Fifi Awards	2006	Women's Best Packaging of the Year - Popular Appeal	Celine Dion Belong	Won	
Fifi Awards	2007	Women's Fragrance of the Year - Popular Appeal	Always Belong	Nominated	
Fifi Awards	2007	Women's Best Packaging of the Year - Popular Appeal	Always Belong	Nominated	
Fifi Awards	2008	Women's Fragrance of the Year - Popular Appeal	Enchanting	Nominated	
Fifi Awards	2009	Women's Fragrance of the Year - Popular Appeal	Sensational	Nominated	
FM Select Diamond Award	1997	Top Female International Artist	Herself	Won	
France Bleu Talent Awards	2013	Honorary Award for the Long-Standing Career in France	Herself	Won	
Fryderyk Awards	1998	Best Foreign Album	Let's Talk About Love	Nominated	
GAFFA Awards	1997	Foreign Female Act	Herself	Nominated	
Gemini Awards	1992	Best Performance in a Variety Program or Series	Celine Dion at the Juno Awards of 1991	Nominated	
Gemini Awards	1994	Best Performance in a Variety Program or Series	Celine Dion at the Juno Awards of 1993	Nominated	
Gemini Awards	1995	Best Performance in a Variety Program or Series	Celine Dion in The Colour of My Love Concert	Nominated	
Grammy Awards	1993	Record of the Year	"Beauty and the Beast"	Nominated	
Grammy Awards	1993	Best Pop Performance by a Duo or Group with Vocal	"Beauty and the Beast"	Won	
Grammy Awards	1993	Album of the Year	Beauty and the Beast: Original Motion Picture Soundtrack	Nominated	
Grammy Awards	1993	Best Pop Vocal Performance, Female	Celine Dion	Nominated	
Grammy Awards	1994	Best Pop Performance by a Duo or Group with Vocal	"When I Fall in Love"	Nominated	
Grammy Awards	1995	Best Female Pop Vocal Performance	"The Power of Love"	Nominated	
Grammy Awards	1997	Record of the Year	"Because You Loved Me"	Nominated	
Grammy Awards	1997	Best Female Pop Vocal Performance	"Because You Loved Me"	Nominated	
Grammy Awards	1997	Album of the Year	Falling into You	Won	
Grammy Awards	1997	Best Pop Album	Falling into You	Won	
Grammy Awards	1998	Best Pop Collaboration with Vocals	"Tell Him"	Nominated	
Grammy Awards	1999	Record of the Year	"My Heart Will Go On"	Won	
Grammy Awards	1999	Best Female Pop Vocal Performance	"My Heart Will Go On"	Won	
Grammy Awards	1999	Best Pop Collaboration with Vocals	"I'm Your Angel"	Nominated	
Grammy Awards	1999	Best Pop Album	Let's talk About Love	Nominated	
Grammy Awards	2000	Best Pop Collaboration with Vocals	"The Prayer"	Nominated	
Grammy Awards	2001	Best Pop Collaboration with Vocals	"All the Way..."	Nominated	
Grand Prix de l'UNAC	2013	Song of the Year	"Parler à mon père"	Won	
Hungarian Music Awards	1998	International Album of the Year	Let's Talk About Love	Won	
Hollywood Walk of Fame	2004	Star on the Hollywood Walk of Fame	Herself	Won	
IFPI Hong Kong Top Sales Music Awards	2002	Best Sales Releases, Foreign	A New Day Has Come	Won	
IFPI Special Awards	2003	Special Award for Selling 50 Million Albums in Europe	Herself	Won	
IFPI Special Awards	2003	Special Award for Selling 10 Million Copies of Let's Talk About Love in Europe	Lets Talk about Love	Won	
International Achievement in Arts Awards	1997	Entertainer of the Year for Distinguished Achievement in Music	Herself	Won	
iHeartRadio Much Music Video Awards	1990	Best MOR Video	"Can't Live with You, Can't Live Without You"	Won	
iHeartRadio Much Music Video Awards	1992	Best Adult Contemporary Video	"Je danse dans ma tête"	Won	
iHeartRadio Much Music Video Awards	1997	People's Choice: Favourite International Artist	Herself	Nominated	
iHeartRadio Much Music Video Awards	1998	Peoples Choice: Favourite Artist	"My Heart Will Go On"	Won	
iHeartRadio Much Music Video Awards	1999	MuchMoreMusic Award	"I'm Your Angel"	Nominated	
iHeartRadio Much Music Video Awards	2000	MuchMoreMusic Award	"That's the Way It Is"	Nominated	
iHeartRadio Much Music Video Awards	2002	MuchMoreMusic Award	"A New Day Has Come"	Nominated	
iHeartRadio Much Music Video Awards	2003	MuchMoreMusic Award	"I Drove All Night"	Nominated	
iHeartRadio Much Music Video Awards	2005	MuchMoreMusic Award	"You and I"	Nominated	
IRMA Awards	1996	Best International Female Artist Album	The Colour of My Love	Won	
IRMA Awards	1997	Best International Female Artist Album	Falling into You	Won	
Japan Gold Disc Awards	1996	International Single Grand Prix Award	"To Love You More"	Won	
Japan Gold Disc Awards	1998	International Pop Album of the Year	Let's Talk About Love	Won	
Japan Gold Disc Awards	1998	International Artist of the Year	Herself	Won	
Japan Gold Disc Awards	1999	International Artist of the Year	Herself	Won	
Japan Gold Disc Awards	1999	International Song of the Year	"My Heart Will Go On"	Won	
Japan Gold Disc Awards	1999	International Pop Album of the Year	These Are Special Times	Won	
Japan Gold Disc Awards	1999	International Soundtrack Album of the Year	Titanic: Music from the Motion Picture	Won	
Japan Gold Disc Awards	1999	International Music Video of the Year	VH1 Divas Live	Won	
Japan Gold Disc Awards	2000	International Artist of the Year	Herself	Won	
Japan Gold Disc Awards	2000	International Pop Album of the Year	All the Way... A Decade of Song	Won	
Japan Record Awards	1998	Special Achievement Award	"My Heart Will Go On"	Won	
Juno Awards	1987	Most Promising Female Vocalist of the Year	Herself	Nominated	
Juno Awards	1989	Female Vocalist of the Year	Herself	Nominated	
Juno Awards	1991	Female Vocalist of the Year	Herself	Won	
Juno Awards	1991	Best Dance Recording	"Unison" (Mainstream Mix)	Nominated	
Juno Awards	1991	Album of the Year	Unison	Won	
Juno Awards	1992	Female Vocalist of the Year	Herself	Won	
Juno Awards	1992	Canadian Entertainer of the Year	Herself	Nominated	
Juno Awards	1993	Female Vocalist of the Year	Herself	Won	
Juno Awards	1993	Canadian Entertainer of the Year	Herself	Nominated	
Juno Awards	1993	Single of the Year	"Beauty and the Beast"	Won	
Juno Awards	1993	Single of the Year	"If You Asked Me To"	Nominated	
Juno Awards	1993	Best Dance Recording	"Love Can Move Mountains" (Club Mix)	Won	
Juno Awards	1993	Best Selling Francophone Album	Dion chante Plamondon	Won	
Juno Awards	1993	Album of the Year	Celine Dion	Nominated	
Juno Awards	1994	Female Vocalist of the Year	Herself	Won	
Juno Awards	1994	Canadian Entertainer of the Year	Herself	Nominated	
Juno Awards	1994	Single of the Year	"Love Can Move Mountains"	Nominated	
Juno Awards	1995	Canadian Entertainer of the Year	Herself	Nominated	
Juno Awards	1995	Single of the Year	"The Power of Love"	Nominated	
Juno Awards	1995	Best Selling Album (Foreign or Domestic)	The Colour of My Love	Won	
Juno Awards	1995	Album of the Year	The Colour of My Love	Won	
Juno Awards	1996	Female Vocalist of the Year	Herself	Nominated	
Juno Awards	1996	Album of the Year	D'eux	Nominated	
Juno Awards	1996	Best Selling Album (Foreign or Domestic)	D'eux	Nominated	
Juno Awards	1996	Best Selling Francophone Album	D'eux	Won	
Juno Awards	1997	Female Vocalist of the Year	Herself	Won	
Juno Awards	1997	International Achievement Award	Herself	Won	
Juno Awards	1997	Single of the Year	"Because You Loved Me"	Nominated	
Juno Awards	1997	Album of the Year	Falling into You	Nominated	
Juno Awards	1997	Best Selling Album (Foreign or Domestic)	Falling into You	Won	
Juno Awards	1997	Best Selling Francophone Album	Live à Paris	Won	
Juno Awards	1999	Best Female Vocalist	Herself	Won	
Juno Awards	1999	International Achievement Award	Herself	Won	
Juno Awards	1999	Best Single	"My Heart Will Go On"	Nominated	
Juno Awards	1999	Best Album	Let's Talk About Love	Won	
Juno Awards	1999	Best Pop Album	Let's Talk About Love	Nominated	
Juno Awards	1999	Best Selling Album (Foreign or Domestic)	Let's Talk About Love	Won	
Juno Awards	1999	Best Selling Album (Foreign or Domestic)	Titanic: Music from the Motion Picture	Nominated	
Juno Awards	1999	Best Selling Francophone Album	S'il suffisait d'aimer	Won	
Juno Awards	2000	Best Female Artist	Herself	Nominated	
Juno Awards	2000	Best Album	These Are Special Times	Nominated	
Juno Awards	2000	Best Selling Album (Foreign or Domestic)	These Are Special Times	Nominated	
Juno Awards	2003	Artist of the Year	Herself	Nominated	
Juno Awards	2003	Fan Choice Award	Herself	Nominated	
Juno Awards	2003	Single of the Year	"A New Day Has Come"	Nominated	
Juno Awards	2003	Album of the Year	A New Day Has Come	Nominated	
Juno Awards	2004	Artist of the Year	Herself	Nominated	
Juno Awards	2004	Fan Choice Award	Herself	Nominated	
Juno Awards	2004	Album of the Year	One Heart	Nominated	
Juno Awards	2004	Best Selling Album (Foreign or Domestic)	1 fille & 4 types	Nominated	
Juno Awards	2005	Artist of the Year	Herself	Nominated	
Juno Awards	2005	Album of the Year	Miracle	Nominated	
Juno Awards	2005	Pop Album of the Year	Miracle	Nominated	
Juno Awards	2006	Fan Choice Award	Herself	Nominated	
Juno Awards	2008	Fan Choice Award	Herself	Nominated	
Juno Awards	2008	Artist of the Year	Herself	Nominated	
Juno Awards	2008	Francophone Album of the Year	D'elles	Nominated	
Juno Awards	2008	Album of the Year	D'elles	Nominated	
Juno Awards	2008	Album of the Year	Taking Chances	Nominated	
Juno Awards	2008	Pop Album of the Year	Taking Chances	Nominated	
Juno Awards	2009	Fan Choice Award	Herself	Nominated	
Juno Awards	2009	Single of the Year	Taking Chances	Nominated	
Juno Awards	2009	Music DVD of the Year	Live in Las Vegas: A New Day...	Nominated	
Juno Awards	2011	Music DVD of the Year	Tournée mondiale Taking Chances: le spectacle	Nominated	
Juno Awards	2013	Fan Choice Award	Herself	Nominated	
Juno Awards	2013	Album of the Year	Sans attendre	Nominated	
Juno Awards	2013	Adult Contemporary Album of the Year	Sans attendre	Nominated	
Juno Awards	2014	Fan Choice Award	Herself	Nominated	
Juno Awards	2014	Artist of the Year	Herself	Nominated	
Juno Awards	2014	Adult Contemporary Album of the Year	Loved Me Back to Life	Nominated	
Juno Awards	2014	Album of the Year	Loved Me Back to Life	Nominated	
Juno Awards	2017	Album of the Year	Encore un soir	Nominated	
Juno Awards	2017	Adult Contemporary Album of the Year	Encore un soir	Nominated	
Juno Awards	2021	Adult Contemporary Album of the Year	Courage	Nominated	
Juno Awards	2021	Album of the Year	Courage	Nominated	
Juno Awards	2021	Artist of the Year	Herself	Nominated	
Karv l'anti-gala	2007	Celebrity You Would Most Trust as Premier of Quebec	Herself	Nominated	
Karv l'anti-gala	2007	Female Artist You Would Like to Have as a Mother	Herself	Nominated	
Karv l'anti-gala	2008	Celebrity with the Coolest Look	Herself	Nominated	
Karv l'anti-gala	2008	Artist You Would Like to Have as a Mother	Herself	Nominated	
Karv l'anti-gala	2008	Singer/Group You Would Most Like to Go on Tour With	Herself	Nominated	
Karv l'anti-gala	2008	Celebrity You Would Trust with the Power to Solve the World's Problems	Herself	Nominated	
Karv l'anti-gala	2010	Personality of the year	Herself	Nominated	
Kraków's Walk of Fame	2008	Inducted into Kraków's Walk of Fame	Herself	Won	
Le Journal de Montréal Awards	2009	Artist of the Decade	Herself	Won	
Legion of Honour	2008	Knight of the Legion of Honour for Merits and Contributions to France	Herself	Won	
Lockdown Awards (LiveXLive)	2020	Stronger Together, Favorite Group/All-Star Performance	"The Prayer" (with Lady Gaga, Andrea Bocelli and John Legend)	Won	
Malta Music Awards	1996	Best Selling International Artist	Herself	Won	
Malta Music Awards	1997	Best Selling International Female Artist	Herself	Won	
MetroStar Awards	1987	Female Vocalist of the Year	Herself	Nominated	
MetroStar Awards	1987	Young Artist of the Year	Herself	Nominated	
MetroStar Awards	1987	Female Personality of the Year	Herself	Nominated	
MetroStar Awards	1988	Female Vocalist of the Year	Herself	Nominated	
MetroStar Awards	1988	Young Artist of the Year	Herself	Won	
MetroStar Awards	1988	Female Personality of the Year	Herself	Nominated	
MetroStar Awards	1988	Jury Award	Herself	Nominated	
Midem Awards	1996	Award for Combined European Sales of Over 10 Million Units in 1995	Herself	Won	
Midem Awards	1996	Award for Sales of Over 4 Million Units Worldwide for the Album D'eux	Herself	Won	
Midem Awards	2002	Best Selling Artist in Europe	Herself	Won	
MovieEntertainment Awards	2006	Entertainment Industry's Most Influential Canadian	Herself	Won	
MTV Europe Music Awards	1998	Best Female	Herself	Nominated	
MTV Movie Awards	1994	Best Song from a Movie	"When I Fall in Love"	Nominated	
MTV Movie Awards	1998	Best Song from a Movie	"My Heart Will Go On"	Nominated	
MTV Asia Awards	1999	International Song of the Year	"My Heart Will Go On"	Won	
MTV Video Music Awards	1998	Best Video from a Film	"My Heart Will Go On"	Nominated	
MTV Video Music Awards	1998	Viewers Choice	"My Heart Will Go On"	Nominated	
MTV Video Music Awards Japan	2008	Best Collaboration	"A World to Believe In"	Nominated	
NARM Best Seller Awards	1997	Artist of the Year	Herself	Won	
NARM Best Seller Awards	1997	Recording of the Year	Falling into You	Won	
NARM Best Seller Awards	1997	Pop Recording of the Year	Falling into You	Won	
NARM Best Seller Awards	1998	Soundtrack of the Year	Titanic: Music from the Motion Picture	Won	
National Post Awards	2002	Most Recognized Canadian	Herself	Won	
National TV 2 Awards	1997	Best International Female Artist	Herself	Won	
Nevada Ballet Theatre Awards	2004	Woman of the Year	Herself	Won	
Nevada Commission on Tourism Awards	2007	Entertainer of the New Millennium	Herself	Won	
NRJ Music Awards	2000	Francophone Female Artist of the Year	Herself	Nominated	
NRJ Music Awards	2000	Francophone Album of the Year	Au cœur du stade	Nominated	
NRJ Music Awards	2002	Francophone Duo/Group of the Year	"Sous le vent"	Won	
NRJ Music Awards	2004	Francophone Album of the Year	1 fille & 4 types	Nominated	
NRJ Music Awards	2006	Francophone Female Artist of the Year	Herself	Nominated	
NRJ Music Awards	2008	Francophone Female Artist of the Year	Herself	Nominated	
NRJ Music Awards	2008	Honorary Award	Herself	Won	
NRJ Music Awards	2016	Francophone Female Artist of the Year	Encore un soir	Nominated	
NRJ Music Awards	2025	International Collaboration of the Year	"A New Day"	Nominated	
NRJ Music Awards	2026	Francophone Concert of the Year	Celine Dion Paris 2026–2027	Nominated	
People's Choice Awards	1999	Favorite Female Musical Performer	Herself	Won	
People's Choice Awards	2000	Favorite Female Musical Performer	Herself	Nominated	
People's Choice Awards	2003	Favorite Female Musical Performer	Herself	Nominated	
People's Choice Awards	2019	The Style Star of 2019	Herself	Nominated	
People's Choice Awards	2019	The Most Hype Worthy Canadian of 2019	Herself	Nominated	
Performance Magazine Awards	1998	Best Pop Act	Herself	Won	
Platinum Ticket Awards	1990	For Selling Over 100,000 Tickets of the Unison Tour in Quebec	Herself	Won	
Pollstar Awards	2021	Pop Touring Artist of the Decade		Nominated	
Pop Corn Music Awards	1997	Best Album of the Year	Falling into You	Won	
Pop Corn Music Awards	1997	Best Female Singer of the Year	Herself	Won	
Pop Corn Music Awards	1998	Best Female Singer of the Year	Herself	Won	
Quebec City Awards	2008	Medal of Quebec City	Herself	Won	
Radio France Internationale Awards	1996	Francophone Council Song	"Pour que tu m'aimes encore"	Won	
SOCAN Awards	2003	Pop Music	A New Day Has Come	Won	
SOCAN Awards	2003	International Achievement	A New Day Has Come	Won	
SOCAN Awards	2009	Classic Songs	A New Day Has Come	Won	
SOCAN Francophone Awards	2006	Song of the Year	"Tout près du bonheur"	Won	
SOCAN Francophone Awards	2012	Songwriter of the Year	"Entre deux mondes"	Won	
Sony Music Entertainment Awards	1999	Special plaque for selling over 100 million albums worldwide	Herself	Won	
Sony Music Entertainment Awards	2002	Special plaque for selling over fifteen million albums and singles in the UK	Herself	Won	
Sony Music Entertainment Awards	2008	Special plaque for selling over three million albums in South Africa	Herself	Won	
Sony Music Entertainment Awards	2008	Special Award for selling over one million albums in Poland	Herself	Won	
Sony Music Entertainment Awards	2008	Special plaque for being the only artist with 7 million-selling albums in Canada	Herself	Won	
Time for Peace Awards	1997	Songwriter and Musical Performance	"Fly"	Won	
VH1 Awards	1997	Artist of the Year	Herself	Won	
VH1 Awards	1998	Artist of the Year	Herself	Won	
VH1 Awards	1998	Best Female Artist	Herself	Won	
VH1 Awards	1998	Diva of the Year	Herself	Won	
Victoires de la Musique	1994	Francophone Artist or Group of the Year	Herself	Nominated	
Victoires de la Musique	1995	Francophone Artist or Group of the Year	Herself	Nominated	
Victoires de la Musique	1996	Francophone Artist or Group of the Year	Herself	Won	
Victoires de la Musique	1996	Song of the Year	"Pour que tu m'aimes encore"	Won	
Victoires de la Musique	1996	Music Video of the Year	"Pour que tu m'aimes encore"	Nominated	
Victoires de la Musique	1999	Female Artist of the Year	Herself	Nominated	
Victoires de la Musique	1999	Pop, Rock Album of the Year	S'il suffisait d'aimer	Nominated	
Victoires de la Musique	2000	Musical, Tour or Concert of the Year	Au cœur du stade	Nominated	
Victoires de la Musique	2002	Original Song of the Year	"Sous le vent"	Won	
Victoires de la Musique	2013	Female Artist of the Year	Herself	Nominated	
What's On, Visitors' Choice Awards	2005	Favorite Headliner	Herself	Won	
What's On, Visitors' Choice Awards	2006	Favorite Headliner	Herself	Won	
World Music Awards	1992	World's Best-Selling Canadian Artist	Herself	Won	
World Music Awards	1995	World's Best-Selling French-Canadian Artist	Herself	Won	
World Music Awards	1996	World's Best-Selling Canadian Artist	Herself	Won	
World Music Awards	1997	World's Overall Best-Selling Recording Artist	Herself	Won	
World Music Awards	1997	World's Best-Selling Pop Artist	Herself	Won	
World Music Awards	1997	World's Best-Selling Canadian Recording Artist	Herself	Won	
World Music Awards	1998	World's Best-Selling Canadian Artist/Group	Herself	Won	
World Music Awards	1999	World's Best-Selling Pop Female Artist	Herself	Won	
World Music Awards	2000	World's Best-Selling Canadian Artist	Herself	Won	
World Music Awards	2004	Chopard Diamond Award	Herself	Won	
World Music Awards	2007	Legend Award	Herself	Won	
World Music Awards	2008	World's Best-Selling Canadian Artist	Herself	Won	
World Popular Song Festival	1982	Outstanding Song Award	"Tellement j'ai d'amour pour toi"	Won	
World Popular Song Festival	1982	Yamaha Pops Orchestra's Maestro Award for Best Artist	Herself	Won	
Webby Awards	2020	People's Voice Award for Experimental & Innovation (Social)	Herself	Won	

== Other accolades ==
=== State and academic honors ===
State and academic honors for Dion
Organization	Year	Award	Ref.
Berklee College of Music	2021	Doctorate in Music	
Canadian Broadcast Hall of Fame	1999	Inducted	
Governor General's Awards	1992	Medal of Recognition	
Legion of Honour	2008	Knight of the Legion of Honour	
Library of Congress	2025	National Recording Registry (for "My Heart Will Go On")	
National Order of Quebec	1998	Appointed Officer of the National Order of Quebec	
Order of Canada	1998	Officer of the Order of Canada	
Order of Canada	2008	Companion of the Order of Canada	
Ordre des Arts et des Lettres	1996	Knight of the Ordre des Arts et des Lettres	
Quebec City's 400th Anniversary Society	2008	Commemorative Medallion	
UNESCO	1999	Artist for Peace	
Université Laval	2008	Doctorate in Music	

=== Guinness World Records ===
Key
†	Indicates a former world-record holder

Year	Record	Nominated work(s)	Ref.
1998	† Highest annual earnings ever for a female pop star ($56 million)	Herself	
2003	Most Juno Awards won for Album of the Year	Herself	
2017	Best-selling single (Canada)	"Pour que tu m'aimes encore"	
2017	Best-selling album (France)	D'eux	
2018	Top selling album act in Europe	Herself	
2024	Most Juno Awards nominations	Herself	

=== Listicles ===
Name of publisher, name of listicle, year(s) listed, and placement result
Publisher	Listicle	Year(s)	Result	Ref.
ABC	30 Greatest Women in Music	2013	28th	
American Film Institute	AFI's 100 Years...100 Songs	2004	14th ("My Heart Will Go On")	
Billboard	Artist of the Decade	1999	5th	
Billboard	Adult Contemporary Artist of the Decade	2009	2nd	
Billboard	Kids Artist of the Decade	2009	7th	
Billboard	Top Touring Artists of the Decade	2009	6th	
Billboard	Top Touring Artists of the Decade	2019	21st	
Billboard	Top Pop Artist	1992	36th	
Billboard	Top Pop Artist	1994	7th	
Billboard	Top Pop Artist	1996	3rd	
Billboard	Top Pop Artist	1997	5th	
Billboard	Top Pop Artist	1998	7th	
Billboard	Top Pop Artist	1999	44th	
Billboard	Top Pop Artist	2000	19th	
Billboard	Top Pop Artist	2002	36th	
Billboard	Top Artist	2016	70th	
Billboard	Top Artist	2017	73rd	
Billboard	Top Artist	2018	96th	
Billboard	Top Artist	2020	70th	
Billboard	Top Billboard 200 Artist	1992	84th	
Billboard	Top Billboard 200 Artist	1994	20th	
Billboard	Top Billboard 200 Artist	1996	5th	
Billboard	Top Billboard 200 Artist	1997	3rd	
Billboard	Top Billboard 200 Artist	1998	1st	
Billboard	Top Billboard 200 Artist	1999	13th	
Billboard	Top Billboard 200 Artist	2000	8th	
Billboard	Top Billboard 200 Artist	2002	20th	
Billboard	Top Billboard 200 Artist	2003	22nd	
Billboard	Top Billboard 200 Artist	2008	25th	
Billboard	Top Hot 100 Female Artist	1991	11th	
Billboard	Top Hot 100 Female Artist	1992	6th	
Billboard	Top Hot 100 Female Artist	1993	15th	
Billboard	Top Hot 100 Female Artist	1994	4th	
Billboard	Top Hot 100 Female Artist	1996	2nd	
Billboard	Top Hot 100 Female Artist	1997	7th	
Billboard	Top Hot 100 Female Artist	1998	8th	
Billboard	Top Hot 100 Female Artist	1999	19th	
Billboard	Top Hot 100 Female Artist	2000	13th	
Billboard	Highest Paid Musicians	2008	5th	
Billboard	Highest Paid Musicians	2009	27th	
Billboard	Highest Paid Musicians	2011	8th	
Billboard	Highest Paid Musicians	2012	53rd	
Billboard	Highest Paid Musicians	2013	23rd	
Billboard	Highest Paid Musicians	2014	30th	
Billboard	Highest Paid Musicians	2015	25th	
Billboard	Highest Paid Musicians	2016	37th	
Billboard	Highest Paid Musicians	2018	26th	
Billboard	Highest Paid Musicians	2020	3rd	
Billboard	Top Album Sales Artist	2002	6th	
Billboard	Top 10 Billboard Chart Milestones	2004	First Airplay-only Hot 100 No. 1 for "I'm Your Angel"	
Billboard	Top 20 Women in Music	2007	Placed	
Billboard	SoundScan Top Artists by Album Sales of the Decade	2009	20th	
Billboard	Decade-End Top 25 Boxscores	2009	4th	
Billboard	The 40 Biggest Duets of All Time	2011	38th ("I'm Your Angel)	
Billboard	Greatest of All Time Hot 100 Artists	2018	87th	
Billboard	Greatest of All Time Artists	2019	33rd	
Billboard	The 99 Greatest Songs of 1999	2019	24th ("That's the Way It Is")	
Billboard	15 Greatest Billboard Music Awards Performances Ever	2020	3rd ("The Show Must Go On")	
Billboard	The Greatest Pop Star of 1996	2020	Honorable mention	
Billboard	Greatest of All Time Top Holiday Albums	2021	8th (These are Special Times)	
Billboard	Greatest of All Time Adult Contemporary Artists	2023	19th	
Billboard	The 500 Best Pop Songs: Staff List	2023	279th ("My Heart Will Go On")	
Billboard	Top 100 Women Artists of the 21st Century	2025	48th	
Billboard	Top 50 Love Songs of All Time	2026	13th ("Because You Loved Me")	
Billboard	Top 50 Love Songs of All Time	2026	44th ("The Power of Love")	
Consequence	The 100 Best Vocalists of All Time	2026	49th	
Cosmopolitan	Top 82 Best Love Songs of the 1990s	2024	2nd ("Because You Loved Me")	
Cosmopolitan	Top 82 Best Love Songs of the 1990s	2024	5th ("My Heart Will Go On")	
Deadline Hollywood	Top 20 Best Musical Moments in the History of the Academy Awards Telecast	2021	10th	
Forbes	World's Highest Paid Celebrities	1997	15th	
Forbes	World's Highest Paid Celebrities	1998	12th	
Forbes	World's Highest Paid Celebrities	1999	13th	
Forbes	World's Highest Paid Celebrities	2020	76th	
Forbes	World's Most Generous Celebrities	2006	Placed	
Forbes	World's Highest Paid Women in Music	2014	7th	
Forbes	World's Highest Paid Women in Music	2016	10th	
Forbes	World's Highest Paid Women in Music	2017	4th	
Forbes	World's Highest Paid Women in Music	2019	9th	
Forbes	Top 20 Richest Women in Entertainment	2007	5th	
Forbes	Wealthiest Women in Music	2008	3rd	
Forbes	America's Richest Self-Made Women in Music	2023	5th	
Forbes	The 50 Best Songs of the 1990s	2024	4th ("My Heart Will Go On")	
Forbes	The 25 Greatest '90s Bands and Artists	2024	14th	
Forbes	30 Notable Women Singers of the '90s	2025	7th	
Glamour	The Best Met Gala Looks Through the Years	2024	Placed	
Google	Most Searched Artist of 2016	2016	2nd	
Guinness World Records: British Hit Singles and Albums	Top 500 Most Successful Artists	2005	49th	
Pitchfork	The 250 Best Songs of 1990s	2022	231st ("It's All Coming Back to Me Now")	
Pollstar	Highest Grossing Touring Artists in North America of the 2000s	2009	2nd	
Pollstar	The 50 Highest Grossing Female Headliners (2000–2019)	2020	2nd	
Pollstar	Millennium's Top 25 Most Popular Women in Touring (2001–2025)	2026	5th	
Reader's Digest	25 Greatest Canadian Albums of All Time	2021	22nd (Falling into You)	
Reuters	Century's Best Female Singer	1999	2nd	
Rock and Roll Hall of Fame	The Definitive 200	2007	97th (Falling into You)	
Rolling Stone	50 Greatest Canadian Artists of All Time	2023	10th	
Rolling Stone	20 Greatest Best Song Oscar Performances	2021	15th	
Smooth Radio	The 30 Best Female Singers of All Time	2023	3rd	
Smooth Radio	The Greatest Oscars Music Performances of All Time	2024	1st	
Stylist	50 Female Pop Pioneers	2011	Placed	
The Mirror	Greatest Love Songs of All Time	2025	3rd ("My Heart Will Go On")	
Recording Industry of America and the National Endowment for the Arts	Songs of the Century	2001	246th ("My Heart Will Go On")	
Vanity Fair	54 Unforgettable Met Gala Looks	2024	Placed	
VH1	100 Greatest Women in Music	2002	3rd	
VH1	50 Greatest Women of the Video Era	2003	10th	
VH1	200 Greatest Pop Culture Icons	2003	64th	
VH1	100 Best Songs of the Past 25 Years	2003	24th ("My Heart Will Go On")	
VH1	100 Greatest Women in Music	2012	21st	
Vogue	Met Gala Best Looks of All Time	2024	Placed	
Vogue	The 58 Best Oscars Red Carpet Dresses of All Time	2024	Placed	
W Magazine	The Most Memorable Oscar Dresses of All Time	2019	Placed	
YouGov	World's Most Admired Women	2015	6th	
