= Live à Paris =

Live album by Celine Dion
- Released: 21 October 1996
- Recorded: October 1995
- Venue: Le Zénith (Paris)
- Genre: Pop
- Length: 73:12
- Languages: French; English
- Labels: Columbia; Epic
- Producer: David Foster

Celine Dion chronology
Falling into You (1996)	Live à Paris (1996)	Let's Talk About Love (1997)

Singles from Live à Paris
- 1. "Je sais pas" Released: 12 May 1997; 2. "J'attendais" Released: 30 June 1997

Live à Paris (lit. 'Live in Paris') is the third live album by Canadian singer Celine Dion, released on 21 October 1996 by Columbia Records and Epic Records. Recorded during Dion's mid‑1990s rise in international popularity, the album presents live performances of her French‑language repertoire—mainly songs from D'eux (1995)—along with concert versions of "The Power of Love" and "River Deep, Mountain High". A studio recording of "To Love You More" appears as a bonus track.

Live à Paris was commercially successful, reaching number one in France, Belgium, Switzerland, and Quebec. It was certified double platinum by the IFPI for sales of more than two million copies across Europe.

To mark the 30th anniversary of Live à Paris, the album received its first vinyl release on 4 September 2026, featuring a revised sequence and tracklist that incorporates material from both the original CD and video editions to present a cohesive, expanded version.

== Content ==
Following the commercial success of D'eux, the best‑selling Francophone album of all time, Dion released Live à Paris, which includes 10 of the 12 tracks from D'eux. The concert was recorded at Zénith Paris in October 1995 during the D'eux Tour, presenting Dion's French‑language repertoire at a period of wide public interest. The album also includes several English‑language songs, among them a studio version of "To Love You More", which became a major hit in Japan. The CD does not contain the full concert; all songs appear on the Live à Paris home video, released later in 1996.

The 30th anniversary of Live à Paris was marked by its first vinyl edition, released on 4 September 2026, featuring a newly arranged sequence and tracklist drawing on selections from both the original CD and video versions.

== Critical reception ==
Professional ratings
Review scores
Source	Rating
AllMusic	4/5 stars
The Daily Vault	A−
RPM	positive

Live à Paris received generally positive reviews from music critics, who noted Dion's vocal strength, the clarity of the arrangements, and the recording's ability to convey the atmosphere of her Paris concerts.

AllMusic wrote that the album has "more of a rock feel than any of Dion's other live or studio albums" and praised her stage presence. The review stated that Dion "raises the roof and proves just as adept with harder material as she is with adult contemporary ballads", concluding that the album "showcases her not only as a balladeer, but as a first‑rate rock star".

The Daily Vault awarded the album an A−, describing it as a live release that effectively conveys the energy of Dion's concerts. The reviewer wrote that the album "captures her trademark live performances in one neat package" and stands apart from many live albums due to its "precision, emotional clarity, and sheer vocal force". The review also observed that the setlist illustrates Dion's range, moving between French‑language ballads and more upbeat material.

Lisa Trainor of RPM also praised the album, saying that it would keep Dion "in the mighty ranks of the chart-toppers". She noted that Live à Paris, recorded in front of 6,000 fans at the renowned Paris Zenith Theatre, includes mostly tracks from D'eux, which has earned Dion the distinction of having the most successful French-language album in history. Among the few English songs, she pointed to "River Deep, Mountain High" as an incredibly powerful cover of the Ike & Tina Turner song. She also praised the first promotional single, "Les derniers seront les premiers", writing that it is indicative of Dion's "amazing talent", and noted her "hauntingly beautiful" and "soaring" vocals on "Pour que tu m'aimes encore".

== Commercial performance ==
Live à Paris debuted at number one in France, selling 200,000 copies in its first week. On 1 November 1996, Dion became the first artist to have three albums simultaneously charting in the French top 20. That week, Live à Paris entered at number one—her third chart‑topping album in France that year—while Falling into You remained at number six seven months after its debut, and D'eux held at number 16 more than a year after its release.

Building on the momentum of D'eux, Live à Paris sold two million copies in Europe and was certified double platinum by the IFPI.

The album sold 810,000 copies in France and 280,000 in Canada, earning double platinum certifications in both countries. It also received platinum certifications in Belgium and Switzerland. In non‑Francophone markets such as the Netherlands and Poland, the album was certified gold.

Live à Paris topped the charts for eight weeks in France, four weeks in Belgium's Wallonia, and one week in both Switzerland and Quebec. It peaked at number six in Belgium's Flanders and number seven in Canada. The album also charted in several non‑Francophone territories, reaching number nine in the Netherlands, number 24 in Austria, number 25 in New Zealand, number 46 in Italy, number 53 in the United Kingdom, and number 63 in Germany. On the European Top 100 Albums, it reached number six.

== Accolades ==
Live à Paris received several major awards. It won the Juno Award for Best Selling Francophone Album and earned two Félix Awards: Best Selling Album and Best Pop Rock Album. These honours reflected the album's strong commercial reception and its place within Dion's body of work.

== Track listing ==
No.	Title	Writer(s)	Length
1.	"J'attendais"	Jean-Jacques Goldman	4:58
2.	"Destin"	Goldman	4:11
3.	"The Power of Love"	Gunther Mende; Candy DeRouge; Jennifer Rush; Mary Susan Applegate	4:45
4.	"Regarde-moi"	Goldman	3:49
5.	"River Deep, Mountain High"	Ellie Greenwich; Jeff Barry; Phil Spector	3:29
6.	"Un garçon pas comme les autres (Ziggy)"	Luc Plamondon; Michel Berger	5:03
7.	"Les derniers seront les premiers"	Goldman	3:52
8.	"J'irai où tu iras" (with Jean-Jacques Goldman)	Goldman	3:46
9.	"Je sais pas"	Goldman; J. Kapler	4:25
10.	"Le ballet"	Goldman	10:33
11.	"Prière païenne"	Goldman	4:55
12.	"Pour que tu m'aimes encore"	Goldman	5:10
13.	"Quand on n'a que l'amour"	Jacques Brel	4:41
14.	"Vole"	Goldman	4:07
15.	"To Love You More" (studio recording)	David Foster; Junior Miles	5:28
Total length:			73:12

2026 vinyl edition
No.	Title	Writer(s)	Length
1.	"J'attendais"	Goldman
2.	"Destin"	Goldman
3.	"The Power of Love"	Mende; DeRouge; Rush; Applegate
4.	"L'amour existe encore"	Plamondon; Riccardo Cocciante
5.	"Regarde-moi"	Goldman
6.	"River Deep, Mountain High"	Greenwich; Barry; Spector
7.	"Un garçon pas comme les autres (Ziggy)"	Plamondon; Berger
8.	"Love Can Move Mountains"	Diane Warren
9.	"Calling You"	Bob Telson
10.	"Les derniers seront les premiers"	Goldman
11.	"J'irai où tu iras" (with Jean-Jacques Goldman)	Goldman
12.	"Je sais pas"	Goldman; Kapler
13.	"Le ballet"	Goldman
14.	"Quand on n'a que l'amour"	Jacques Brel
15.	"Le blues du businessman"	Plamondon; Berger
16.	"Prière païenne"	Goldman
17.	"Pour que tu m'aimes encore"	Goldman
18.	"Vole"	Goldman
19.	"À Paris" (studio recording)	Francis Lemarque

=== Notes ===
- "To Love You More" was produced by David Foster.
- The 2026 vinyl edition features "L'amour existe encore", "Love Can Move Mountains", "Calling You", "Le blues du businessman", and a studio recording of "À Paris" as additional tracks, excluding "To Love You More". The only song included on Live à Paris video and not featured on the 2026 vinyl edition is "Misled".
- "À Paris" is a 1946 song covered by Celine Dion in 2005 to support the Paris Olympic bid, and was intended to serve as the official anthem had the city been selected to host the 2012 Summer Olympics.

== Charts ==
=== Weekly charts ===
Weekly chart performance
Chart (1996–1997)	Peak position
Australian Albums (ARIA)	122
Austrian Albums (Ö3 Austria)	24
Belgian Albums (Ultratop Flanders)	6
Belgian Albums (Ultratop Wallonia)	1
Canada Top Albums/CDs (RPM)	8
Canadian Albums (Billboard)	7
Dutch Albums (Album Top 100)	9
European Albums (Music & Media)	6
French Albums (SNEP)	1
German Albums (Offizielle Top 100)	63
New Zealand Albums (RMNZ)	25
Portuguese Albums (AFP)	4
Quebec (ADISQ)	1
Scottish Albums (Official Charts)	81
Swiss Albums (Schweizer Hitparade)	1
UK Albums (Official Charts)	53

=== Year-end charts ===
1996 year-end chart performance
Chart (1996)	Position
Canada Top Albums/CDs (RPM)	72
Dutch Albums (MegaCharts)	95
French Albums (SNEP)	10

1997 year-end chart performance
Chart (1997)	Position
Belgian Albums (Ultratop Flanders)	75
Belgian Albums (Ultratop Wallonia)	25
Canadian Albums (SoundScan)	83
Dutch Albums (MegaCharts)	41
European Albums (Music & Media)	57
French Albums (SNEP)	31

=== All-time charts ===
All-time chart performance
Chart	Position
Canadian Artists Albums (SoundScan)	90

== Certifications and sales ==
Certifications
Region	Certification	Certified units/sales
Belgium (BRMA)	Platinum	50,000^{*}
Canada (Music Canada)	2× Platinum	280,000
France (SNEP)	2× Platinum	600,000^{*}
Netherlands (NVPI)	Gold	50,000^{^}
Poland (ZPAV)	Gold	50,000^{*}
Switzerland (IFPI Switzerland)	Platinum	50,000^{^}
Summaries
Europe (IFPI)	2× Platinum	2,000,000^{*}
^{*} Sales figures based on certification alone.^{^} Shipments figures based on certification alone.

== Release history ==
Release history
Region	Date	Label	Format	Catalog
France	21 October 1996	Columbia	CD; cassette	486606
United Kingdom	28 October 1996	Epic	CD; cassette	4836062
Canada	29 October 1996	Columbia	CD; cassette	80238
Japan	22 January 1997	SMEJ	CD	ESCA-6637
Australia	February 1997	Epic	CD	486606
Various	4 September 2026	Sony	Vinyl LP	19958456891

== See also ==
- Juno Award for Francophone Album of the Year
