= D'eux Tour =

1995–1996 concert tour by Céline Dion

- Tour by Celine Dion
- Cover of the tour program
- Location: Canada; Europe
- Associated album: D'eux
- Start date: 25 September 1995
- End date: 3 February 1996
- No. of shows: 47

Celine Dion concert chronology
- The Colour of My Love Tour (1994–1995); D'eux Tour (1995–1996); Falling into You: Around the World (1996–1997)

The D'eux Tour was the seventh concert tour by Canadian singer Celine Dion, launched to promote her tenth French-language studio album, D'eux (1995). The tour marked Dion's return to extensive live performance in Europe and coincided with the album's growing international success. D'eux ultimately became the best‑selling French‑language album of all time.

== History ==
Following five initial concerts in Quebec City, Dion embarked on a four‑month European tour, performing in 11 countries and giving 42 sold‑out shows. The itinerary included nine dates in Paris, many in venues with capacities exceeding 14,000. Irish band The Corrs served as an opening act during the United Kingdom and Ireland dates. During one performance at the Zénith de Paris, Dion temporarily lost her voice.

== Opening acts ==
- The Corrs (United Kingdom and Ireland)

== Set list ==
The following set list represents performances in Francophone countries and does not reflect all concerts.

1. "J'attendais"
2. "Destin"
3. "The Power of Love"
4. "L'amour existe encore"
5. "Regarde-moi"
6. "River Deep, Mountain High"
7. "Where Does My Heart Beat Now"
8. "Un garçon pas comme les autres (Ziggy)"
9. "Beauty and the Beast"
10. "Misled"
11. "Love Can Move Mountains"
12. "Calling You"
13. "Le blues du businessman"
14. "Des mots qui sonnent"
15. "Les derniers seront les premiers"
16. "J'irai où tu iras"
17. "Unison"
18. "Think Twice"
19. "Je sais pas"
20. "Le ballet"
21. "Prière païenne"
22. "Pour que tu m'aimes encore"
23. "Quand on n'a que l'amour"
24. "Vole"

== Notes ==
- In non‑Francophone countries, the set list consisted primarily of Dion's English‑language repertoire.

== Tour dates ==
List of 1995 concerts
Date (1995)	City	Country	Venue
25 September	Quebec City	Canada	Le Capitole de Québec
26 September	Quebec City	Canada	Le Capitole de Québec
28 September	Quebec City	Canada	Le Capitole de Québec
29 September	Quebec City	Canada	Le Capitole de Québec
30 September	Quebec City	Canada	Le Capitole de Québec
6 October	Montpellier	France	Zénith de Montpellier
7 October	Toulon	France	Zénith Oméga de Toulon
10 October	Marseille	France	Le Dôme de Marseille
11 October	Nice	France	Apollon
13 October	Toulouse	France	Palais des Sports de Toulouse
14 October	Bordeaux	France	Patinoire de Mériadeck
17 October	Lille	France	Zénith de Lille
18 October	Brussels	Belgium	Forest National
20 October	Paris	France	Zénith de Paris
21 October	Paris	France	Zénith de Paris
22 October	Paris	France	Zénith de Paris
23 October	Paris	France	Zénith de Paris
24 October	Paris	France	Zénith de Paris
27 October	Glasgow	Scotland	Scottish Exhibition Hall 4
29 October	Manchester	England	NYNEX Arena
30 October	Sheffield	England	Sheffield Arena
1 November	London	England	Wembley Arena
4 November	Birmingham	England	NEC Arena
5 November	Belfast	Northern Ireland	King's Hall
10 November	Caen	France	Zénith de Caen
11 November	Amnéville	France	Galaxie Amnéville
14 November	Geneva	Switzerland	Arena de Genève
15 November	Lyon	France	Halle Tony Garnier
17 November	Grenoble	France	Palais des Sports
19 November	Zürich	Switzerland	Hallenstadion
20 November	Strasbourg	France	Rhénus Hall
22 November	Düsseldorf	Germany	Philipshalle
24 November	Oslo	Norway	Oslo Spektrum
25 November	Stockholm	Sweden	Stockholm Globe Arena
26 November	Dublin	Ireland	Point Theatre
27 November	Copenhagen	Denmark	Valby-Hallen
29 November	Hamburg	Germany	Halle H at Congress Centrum
1 December	Rotterdam	Netherlands	De Doelen
2 December	Forest	Belgium	Forest National
4 December	Paris	France	Palais Omnisports de Paris-Bercy

List of 1996 concerts
Date (1996)	City	Country	Venue
25 January	Marseille	France	Le Dôme de Marseille
26 January	Lyon	France	Halle Tony Garnier
29 January	Paris	France	Palais Omnisports de Paris-Bercy
30 January	Paris	France	Palais Omnisports de Paris-Bercy
31 January	Paris	France	Palais Omnisports de Paris-Bercy
2 February	Forest	Belgium	Forest National
3 February	Forest	Belgium	Forest National

== Broadcasts and recordings ==
The concert at the Zénith de Paris was recorded before an audience of more than 6,000 and released as the live album Live à Paris in October 1996. A VHS edition followed in November 1996, with a DVD reissue released in November 2003.

== Personnel ==
- Celine Dion – lead vocals

=== Band ===
- Claude "Mego" Lemay – musical director, keyboards
- Dominique Messier – drums
- Marc Langis – bass
- Yves Frulla – keyboards
- André Coutu – guitars
- Paul Picard – percussion
- Terry Bradford – backing vocals
- Elise Duguay – backing vocals
- Rachelle Jeanty – backing vocals

=== Production ===
- René Angélil – management
- Suzanne Gingue – tour director
- Ian Donald – production director
- Michel Dion – assistant to the tour director
- Denis Savage – front of house sound engineer
- Daniel Baron – stage sound engineer
- François Desjardins – sound system technician
- Marc Beauchamp – sound system technician
- Yves Aucoin – lighting director
- Normand Chassé – assistant lighting director
- Jean-François Canuel – lighting technician
- Jean-François Dubois – band gear technician
- Guy Vignola – band gear technician
- Patrick Angélil – production assistant
- Jean-Pierre Angélil – tour assistant
- Louise Labranche – tour assistant
- Eric Burrows – bodyguard
- Louis Hechter – hairstylist
- Annie L. Horth – stylist
- Dominique Giraldeau – choreographer
