= Le ballet =

Promotional single by Celine Dion

from the album D'eux
- Language: French
- Released: January 1996
- Recorded: November–December 1994
- Studio: Méga (Paris)
- Genre: Pop; blues; soul; jazz
- Length: 4:26
- Label: Columbia
- Songwriter: Jean-Jacques Goldman
- Producers: Jean-Jacques Goldman; Erick Benzi

Audio
- "Le ballet" on YouTube

"Le ballet" (lit. 'The ballet') is a song by Canadian singer Celine Dion from her thirteenth studio album, D'eux (1995). Written by Jean-Jacques Goldman and produced by Goldman and Erick Benzi, it was released as a promotional single in France in January 1996. The track became a radio hit, topping the French airplay chart for two weeks, and ranked as the sixth most economically profitable song of 1996 in France.

== Background and release ==
Dion recorded D'eux in November and December 1994 at the Méga Studio in Paris, France. Most of the album was written by Jean-Jacques Goldman, with production handled by Goldman and Erick Benzi. "Le ballet" was selected as the third promotional single and issued in France in January 1996. The following month, it appeared as the B-side of the "Falling into You" single.

"Le ballet" is a blues‑influenced groove built around percussive finger snaps, harmonica, and electric guitar, marking Dion's first exploration of blues vocal stylings. The track reflects the broader sound of D'eux, which incorporates elements of continental pop, folk, jazz, and 1970s soul. It is often cited as an example of Goldman's ability to write about mature themes and emotional nuance.

The song is also known for Dion's playful vocal imitations of instruments. Beginning with her D'eux Tour in 1995, and documented on the Live à Paris album, she used an extended version of "Le ballet" to introduce her band members. She performed it in a similar manner on the Falling Into You Around the World Tour and during her European concerts in 2017. In 2005, the track was included on her greatest hits album On ne change pas.

== Commercial performance ==
"Le ballet" entered the French airplay chart on 27 January 1996 and topped it for two weeks, on 2 and 9 March 1996. It spent 10 weeks inside the top 10 and left the top 20 on 20 April 1996 after 12 weeks on the chart. It became Dion's highest‑charting song on the French airplay chart, surpassing "Je sais pas" (number two) and "Pour que tu m'aimes encore" (number three). According to SACEM, "Le ballet" ranked as the sixth most economically profitable song of 1996 in France.

== Charts ==
=== Weekly charts ===
Weekly chart performance
Chart (1996)	Peak position
France Airplay (SNEP)	1

=== Year-end charts ===
Year-end chart performance
Chart (1996)	Position
France (SACEM)	6
