= D'eux =

Studio album by Celine Dion
- Released: 30 March 1995
- Recorded: November–December 1994
- Studio: Méga (Paris)
- Genre: Pop
- Length: 47:15
- Language: French
- Labels: Columbia; Epic
- Producers: Jean-Jacques Goldman; Erick Benzi

Celine Dion chronology
À l'Olympia (1994)	D'eux (1995)	Falling into You (1996)

Singles from D'eux
- 1. "Pour que tu m'aimes encore" Released: 13 March 1995; 2. "Je sais pas" Released: 21 August 1995

D'eux (lit. 'Of them' or 'about them' or 'from them'; homophonic with deux, meaning "two") is the thirteenth studio album by Canadian singer Celine Dion and her tenth in the French language. Released by Columbia Records and Epic Records on 30 March 1995 in Canada and on 3 April 1995 in France, the album marked a major point in Dion's francophone career. In the United States, it was issued under the title The French Album.

Created and produced mainly by French singer‑songwriter Jean-Jacques Goldman, the project represented a shift in Dion's artistic direction, combining her vocal style with Goldman's contemporary pop and chanson approach. The album was introduced with the single "Pour que tu m'aimes encore", which became one of the most well‑known songs in her French‑language catalogue.

D'eux received critical acclaim and achieved exceptional commercial success. It became the best‑selling album of all time in France, the best‑selling French‑language album worldwide, and the best‑selling non‑English‑language album by a female artist. With global sales estimated at over 12 million copies, it remains one of the most commercially successful and widely discussed francophone albums in popular music.

== Background, release, and content ==
D'eux was recorded at Mega Studio in Paris in November and December 1994. French singer‑songwriter Jean-Jacques Goldman wrote and produced 11 of the album's 12 tracks, creating a set of songs that combined personal themes with mainstream pop production. The remaining track, "Cherche encore", was written by Erick Benzi, who also worked on the album's production.

The album includes a duet with Goldman on "J'irai où tu iras", along with two of Dion's most commercially successful French‑language singles: "Pour que tu m'aimes encore" and "Je sais pas". It also contains "Vole", a song dedicated to Dion's niece, who died from cystic fibrosis. These three titles were later adapted into English—"If That's What It Takes", "I Don't Know", and "Fly"—for Dion's Grammy‑winning album Falling into You.

D'eux was released on 30 March 1995 in Canada and on 3 April 1995 in France. It was then issued across Europe between April and November 1995, and reached the United States in May 1995 under the title The French Album. The record was released in New Zealand in January 1996 and in Japan in October 1996. Dion's 2007 French‑language album, D'elles, later referenced D'eux through its title, using the specifically feminine form.

== Singles ==
The lead single, "Pour que tu m'aimes encore", was released in Quebec and France in March 1995, followed by selected international markets in the months that followed. The song became one of the most commercially successful titles of Dion's Francophone career, reaching number one across several French‑speaking regions. It topped the chart in France for 12 weeks and in Belgium's Wallonia for 15 consecutive weeks, and also reached number one in Quebec for four weeks. It became the best‑selling single of 1995 in both France and Wallonia, selling nearly one million copies in France. Unusually for a French‑language release, it also entered the top 10 in Belgium's Flanders, the Netherlands, Sweden, the United Kingdom, and Ireland, and peaked at number four on the European Hot 100 Singles.

The second single, "Je sais pas", maintained the album's strong chart presence. Released in Quebec in July 1995, in Belgium in August, and in France in October, it topped the charts in France for seven weeks, in Wallonia for two weeks, and in Quebec for four weeks. It reached number seven on the European Hot 100 Singles, and ranked among the best‑selling singles of 1995 in France and Wallonia.

"Le ballet" was released in France in January 1996 as a promotional single, reaching number five on the national airplay chart. It was later issued as the B‑side of the French commercial single "Falling into You".

In Quebec, radio stations began playing "Destin" in January 1996. The track received more than eight months of airplay and peaked at number three. In May 1996, Quebec radio also added "J'irai où tu iras", Dion's duet with Jean-Jacques Goldman, which reached number 14 on the airplay chart.

All singles from D'eux were later included on Dion's 2005 greatest hits compilation, On ne change pas.

== Promotion ==
Dion supported D'eux with an extensive promotional campaign. In late March and early April 1995, she appeared on numerous television programs in Quebec and France, presenting the new material to francophone audiences. Her promotion soon extended beyond French‑speaking markets: in June 1995, Dion performed "Pour que tu m'aimes encore" on Good Morning America and The Tonight Show, marking the first time she introduced a French‑language song on major American television. She also recorded a performance of the single in New York for the British chart program Top of the Pops, reflecting the song's unusual international exposure.

In September 1995, Dion launched the D'eux Tour, beginning with a series of concerts in Quebec. Between October 1995 and February 1996, she performed more than 40 shows across Europe, bringing the album's material to large audiences throughout the region. Her concerts at the Zénith de Paris were recorded and later released in 1996 as the live album Live à Paris and the accompanying home video Live à Paris, both of which contributed to the continued visibility of the D'eux era.

== Critical reception ==
Professional ratings
Review scores
Source	Rating
AllMusic	3/5 stars
Billboard	positive
Le Droit	positive
Le Monde	5/5 stars
La Presse	5/5 stars
Public	19/20
Télérama	5/5 stars
Variety	positive

D'eux received critical acclaim from both francophone and international outlets, with many reviewers noting the album's strong songwriting, detailed production, and Dion's controlled and expressive vocal delivery. Stephen Thomas Erlewine of AllMusic awarded the album three out of five stars, praising Jean-Jacques Goldman's writing and observing that the material suits Dion's adult contemporary approach. He described D'eux as a "well‑crafted and engaging pop record" that "on the whole, sounds good".

Billboard commented on the album's unusual global reach for a French‑language release. Emmanuel LeGrand wrote that D'eux "broke boundaries all around the world", adding that "the magnitude of Dion's success has overshadowed the rest of the crop".

Francophone critics responded very positively. Le Monde awarded the album a perfect rating, noting its musical coherence and the effectiveness of the Dion–Goldman collaboration. La Presse also gave it five out of five stars, and Le Droit highlighted the strength of the partnership between the singer and songwriter.

The French magazine Public rated D'eux 19 out of 20, describing it as "a coherent, handwritten album" that brings together blues, rock, ballads, and soul, with Dion's voice central to its impact. The review added that she "finally touches the French public, like a modern Édith Piaf". Télérama also noted the album's lasting popularity and cultural presence in France. Variety wrote that the album continues to be celebrated by prominent Canadian and European musicians decades after its release.

== Commercial performance ==
D'eux became a major commercial success, ultimately becoming the best‑selling French‑language album in history, with worldwide sales estimated at over 12 million copies.

In France, D'eux debuted at number one and remained at the top of the chart for a record‑breaking 44 weeks, the longest run for any album in the country's chart history. When Dion released Falling into You in March 1996, it entered at number two, directly behind D'eux, which continued its extended stay at number one. According to Billboard, the album sold 2.3 million copies in France between April and December 1995. It topped the French year‑end chart for 1995 and placed fourth in 1996. D'eux was certified diamond in August 1995 and has sold 4.5 million copies in France, making it the highest‑selling album in the country's history.

In Belgium, D'eux spent 37 weeks at number one in Wallonia, a record that still stands, and finished as the best‑selling album of 1995. It also reached number one in Flanders for four weeks. In 1997, it was certified six times platinum and remains among the most commercially successful albums in Belgian chart history.

In Switzerland, the album spent five weeks at number one and ended 1995 as the second best‑selling album of the year, later becoming the top‑selling album of 1996. It was certified four times platinum in 1998 and continues to rank among the country's best‑selling albums. D'eux also reached number one in the Netherlands for two weeks and was certified platinum.

In Quebec, the album spent 34 weeks at number one, becoming one of the province's most commercially successful releases. On the Canadian Albums Chart, it peaked at number 29 and was certified seven times platinum in 1997 for sales of 700,000 copies.

Although recorded entirely in French, D'eux also saw notable results in non‑Francophone markets. In the United Kingdom, it peaked at number seven, the highest position ever achieved by a French‑language album, and was certified gold for 250,000 copies sold. Dion became the first, and remains the only, artist to receive UK gold certification for a French‑language recording. She later achieved the same with S'il suffisait d'aimer.

In the United States, released as The French Album, D'eux sold 300,000 copies. It also reached the top 10 in Portugal, Denmark, and Sweden, and earned platinum certification in Poland and gold in New Zealand.

On the European Top 100 Albums, D'eux peaked at number three and was later certified eight times platinum by the IFPI for sales of eight million copies across Europe.

== Accolades ==
D'eux received wide recognition and numerous awards and nominations. At the Juno Awards of 1996, the album was nominated for Album of the Year, Best Selling Album (Foreign or Domestic), and Best Selling Francophone Album. Dion won Best Selling Francophone Album and was also nominated for Female Vocalist of the Year.

In 1995, Dion earned seven nominations at the Félix Awards and won three categories: Artist of the Year Achieving the Most Success Outside Quebec, Pop/Rock Album of the Year (D'eux), and Most Popular Song of the Year ("Pour que tu m'aimes encore"). Additional nominations included Female Vocalist of the Year, Best Selling Album of the Year (D'eux), and Video of the Year ("Pour que tu m'aimes encore"). The following year, Dion received eight Félix Award nominations and won six, including Artist of the Year Achieving the Most Success Outside Quebec, Female Vocalist of the Year, Best Selling Album of the Year (D'eux), and Show of the Year for the D'eux Tour. "Je sais pas" was also nominated for Most Popular Song of the Year and Video of the Year. Dion's television specials Céline Dion – D'eux and Céline Dion – spécial d'enfer received Gémeaux Awards nominations in 1995 and 1996.

In France, Dion received three nominations at the 1996 Victoires de la Musique: Francophone Artist of the Year, Song of the Year ("Pour que tu m'aimes encore"), and Music Video of the Year ("Pour que tu m'aimes encore"). She won in the first two categories. "Pour que tu m'aimes encore" also received the Radio France Internationale Award in 1996 (Conseil Francophone de la Chanson).

In 1996, Dion was appointed to the Ordre des Arts et des Lettres in recognition of her achievements as the best‑selling French‑language artist in history. She also received a World Music Award for World's Best Selling Canadian Artist of the Year.

== Impact and legacy ==
The francophone press often credited D'eux with reshaping views on the artistic and commercial possibilities of French‑language pop music. Le Journal de Montréal wrote that the album "forever changed the perception of what French pop could achieve commercially and artistically," noting the lyrical sophistication and polished production brought by Jean‑Jacques Goldman.

In 2003, the French public radio station RTL and the music television network M6 ranked D'eux as the greatest French‑language album of all time. The album was also included in Télérama's list of the "100 discs that changed the world," which highlighted its cultural reach and its role in expanding the international visibility of francophone pop.

D'eux has been cited by many francophone artists as an influence on their approach to songwriting, emotional expression, and vocal interpretation. Belgian‑Canadian singer Lara Fabian described the album as a landmark work within the genre and an important moment for French‑language popular music.

As of 2025, D'eux remains the best‑selling French‑language album of all time, with global sales surpassing 12 million copies. Its continued commercial success, critical reception, and cultural impact have contributed to its standing as one of the most widely recognised francophone albums.

== 15th anniversary edition ==
To mark the 15th anniversary of D'eux, Legacy Recordings issued D'eux – 15th anniversary edition in November 2009 in Europe and in December 2009 in Canada. The edition was released on 27 November 2009 in France.

The anniversary edition includes the original album together with rare and previously unreleased material from Jean-Jacques Goldman's personal archives. These recordings comprise three demos—"Pour que tu m'aimes encore", "Le ballet", and "J'irai où tu iras"—as well as instrumental versions of "Vole" and "Pour que tu m'aimes encore". The release also provides opendisc access to unpublished photographs from the album's cover sessions and an alternate version of "J'attendais" with revised lyrics by Goldman.

The bonus DVD contains the 1995 television special Spécial Dimanche, hosted by Sonia Benezra and originally broadcast in Quebec. The program includes live performances of "Je sais pas", "J'irai où tu iras" (with Goldman), "Les derniers seront les premiers", "Pour que tu m'aimes encore", and "Vole", along with interview segments that document the working relationship between Dion and Goldman. The DVD also includes four music videos: "Pour que tu m'aimes encore", "Les derniers seront les premiers", "J'attendais", and "Je sais pas".

D'eux – 15th anniversary edition is packaged in a double digipack with a 40‑page booklet. It includes two previously unpublished texts by Goldman—one written in 1995 for the album's initial release and another prepared for the anniversary edition—together with rare photographs from the cover sessions and a reproduction of Goldman's handwritten lyrics for "Pour que tu m'aimes encore".

== Track listing ==
All tracks were written by Jean-Jacques Goldman, except where noted, and produced by Goldman and Erick Benzi.

No.	Title	Writer(s)	Length
1.	"Pour que tu m'aimes encore"		4:15
2.	"Le ballet"		4:26
3.	"Regarde-moi"		3:57
4.	"Je sais pas"	Goldman; J. Kapler	4:34
5.	"La mémoire d'Abraham"		3:50
6.	"Cherche encore"	Benzi	3:25
7.	"Destin"		4:15
8.	"Les derniers seront les premiers"		3:33
9.	"J'irai où tu iras" (with Jean-Jacques Goldman)		3:27
10.	"J'attendais"		4:24
11.	"Prière païenne"		4:11
12.	"Vole"		2:58
Total length:			47:15

=== Notes ===
- The 15th anniversary edition includes demo versions of "Pour que tu m'aimes encore", "Le ballet", and "J'irai où tu iras", as well as instrumental versions of "Vole" and "Pour que tu m'aimes encore".
- The 15th anniversary edition also includes a bonus DVD containing the 1995 television special Le Sonia Benezra Spécial Dimanche and the music videos for "Pour que tu m'aimes encore", "Les derniers seront les premiers", "J'attendais", and "Je sais pas".

== Personnel ==
Adapted from AllMusic.

- Beckie Bell – choir, chorus
- Erick Benzi – arranger, programming
- Sylvain Beuf – saxophone
- Christopher Deschamps – drums
- Arnaud Dunoyer de Segonzac – piano
- Celine Dion – vocals
- Carole Fredericks – choir, chorus
- Claude Gassian – photography
- Humberto Gatica – mixing
- Jean-Jacques Goldman – arranger
- Emmanuel Goulet – assistant engineer
- Yannick Hardouin – bass
- Neil Jason – bass
- Yvonne Jones – choir, chorus
- Denis Leloup – trombone
- Basile Leroux – guitar
- Vito Luprano – executive producer
- Christian Martínez – trumpet
- Christophe Nègre – saxophone
- Frédéric Perrinet – assistant engineer
- Roland Romanelli – piano
- Antoine Russo – trumpet
- Patrice Tison – guitar
- Brian Vibberts – assistant engineer

== Charts ==
=== Weekly charts ===
Weekly chart performance
Chart (1995–1997)	Peak position
Australian Albums (ARIA)	138
Austrian Albums (Ö3 Austria)	35
Belgian Albums (Ultratop Flanders)	1
Belgian Albums (Ultratop Wallonia)	1
Canada Top Albums/CDs (RPM)	29
Canadian Albums (The Record)	31
Danish Albums (Hitlisten)	5
Dutch Albums (Album Top 100)	1
European Albums (Music & Media)	3
Finnish Albums (Suomen virallinen lista)	23
French Albums (SNEP)	1
German Albums (Offizielle Top 100)	69
Icelandic Albums (Tónlist)	4
Japanese Albums (Oricon)	50
New Zealand Albums (RMNZ)	17
Portuguese Albums (AFP)	2
Quebec (ADISQ)	1
Scottish Albums (Official Charts)	19
Swedish Albums (Sverigetopplistan)	9
Swiss Albums (Schweizer Hitparade)	1
UK Albums (Official Charts)	7

=== Year-end charts ===
1995 year-end chart performance
Chart (1995)	Position
Belgian Albums (Ultratop Flanders)	4
Belgian Albums (Ultratop Wallonia)	1
Belgian Francophone Albums (Ultratop Wallonia)	1
Dutch Albums (MegaCharts)	22
European Albums (Music & Media)	12
French Albums (SNEP)	1
Swiss Albums (Schweizer Hitparade)	2

1996 year-end chart performance
Chart (1996)	Position
Dutch Albums (MegaCharts)	16
European Albums (Music & Media)	13
French Albums (SNEP)	4
Swedish Albums (Sverigetopplistan)	53
Swiss Albums (Schweizer Hitparade)	1

1997 year-end chart performance
Chart (1997)	Position
Belgian Albums (Ultratop Wallonia)	36

2025 year-end chart performance
Chart (2025)	Position
Belgian Albums (Ultratop Wallonia)	187

== Certifications and sales ==
Certifications
Region	Certification	Certified units/sales
Belgium (BRMA)	6× Platinum	300,000^{*}
Canada (Music Canada)	7× Platinum	700,000^{^}
France (SNEP)	Diamond	4,500,000
Netherlands (NVPI)	Platinum	100,000^{^}
New Zealand (RMNZ)	Gold	7,500^{^}
Poland (ZPAV)	Platinum	100,000^{*}
Switzerland (IFPI Switzerland)	4× Platinum	200,000^{^}
United Kingdom (BPI)	Gold	250,000
United States	—	300,000
Summaries
Europe (IFPI)	8× Platinum	8,000,000^{*}
Worldwide	—	12,000,000
^{*} Sales figures based on certification alone.^{^} Shipments figures based on certification alone.

== Release history ==
Release history
Region	Date	Label	Format	Catalog
Canada	30 March 1995	Columbia	CD; cassette	80219
France	3 April 1995	Columbia	CD; cassette	480286
Switzerland	4 April 1995	Columbia	CD; cassette	480286
Germany	12 May 1995	Columbia	CD; cassette	480286
United States	16 May 1995	550 Music	CD; cassette	67107
United Kingdom	25 September 1995	Epic	CD; cassette	480286
Japan	2 October 1996	SMEJ	CD	ESCA-6542
France	27 November 2009	Legacy	CD/DVD	88697559222
Canada	1 December 2009	Legacy	CD/DVD	88697559222
Canada; Europe	1 September 2017	Columbia	LP	88985449561

== See also ==
- Juno Award for Francophone Album of the Year
- List of best-selling albums by women
- List of best-selling albums in Europe
- List of best-selling albums in France
