= Ultratop 40 number-one hits of 1995 =

This is a list of songs that topped the Belgian Walloon (francophone) Ultratop 40 in 1995.

Date	Title	Artist
April 8	"Zombie"	The Cranberries
April 15	"Zombie"	The Cranberries
April 22	"Zombie"	The Cranberries
April 29	"Respect"	Alliance Ethnik
May 6	"Scatman (Ski Ba Bop Ba Dop Bop)"	Scatman John
May 13	"Pour que tu m'aimes encore"	Celine Dion
May 20	"Pour que tu m'aimes encore"	Celine Dion
May 27	"Pour que tu m'aimes encore"	Celine Dion
June 3	"Pour que tu m'aimes encore"	Celine Dion
June 10	"Pour que tu m'aimes encore"	Celine Dion
June 17	"Pour que tu m'aimes encore"	Celine Dion
June 24	"Pour que tu m'aimes encore"	Celine Dion
July 1	"Pour que tu m'aimes encore"	Celine Dion
July 8	"Pour que tu m'aimes encore"	Celine Dion
July 15	"Pour que tu m'aimes encore"	Celine Dion
July 22	"Pour que tu m'aimes encore"	Celine Dion
July 29	"Pour que tu m'aimes encore"	Celine Dion
August 5	"Pour que tu m'aimes encore"	Celine Dion
August 12	"Pour que tu m'aimes encore"	Celine Dion
August 19	"Pour que tu m'aimes encore"	Celine Dion
August 26	"Scatman's World"	Scatman John
September 2	"Scatman's World"	Scatman John
September 9	"Scatman's World"	Scatman John
September 16	"Scatman's World"	Scatman John
September 23	"Scatman's World"	Scatman John
September 30	"Scatman's World"	Scatman John
October 7	"Scatman's World"	Scatman John
October 14	"Scatman's World"	Scatman John
October 21	"Scatman's World"	Scatman John
October 28	"You Are Not Alone"	Michael Jackson
November 4	"Je sais pas"	Celine Dion
November 11	"Je sais pas"	Celine Dion
November 18	"You Are Not Alone"	Michael Jackson
November 25	"You Are Not Alone"	Michael Jackson
December 2	"Gangsta's Paradise"	Coolio featuring L.V.
December 9	"Gangsta's Paradise"	Coolio featuring L.V.
December 16	"Gangsta's Paradise"	Coolio featuring L.V.
December 23	"Gangsta's Paradise"	Coolio featuring L.V.
December 30	"Gangsta's Paradise"	Coolio featuring L.V.

== See also ==
- 1995 in music
