= Tous les secrets =

Single by Celine Dion

from the album On ne change pas
- Language: French
- B-side: "Let Your Heart Decide"
- Released: 10 March 2006
- Studio: Digital Insight; Location
- Genre: Pop
- Length: 2:46
- Label: Columbia
- Songwriters: Kristian Lundin; Sebastian Thott; Didrik Thott; Carl Bjorsell; Jacques Veneruso
- Producer: Kristian Lundin

Celine Dion singles chronology
"Je ne vous oublie pas" (2005)	"Tous les secrets" (2006)	"Tout près du bonheur" (2006)

Audio
- "Tous les secrets" on YouTube

"Tous les secrets" (lit. 'All the secrets') is the second single from Celine Dion's 2005 French-language greatest hits album On ne change pas and a theme song for the animated film Asterix and the Vikings. It was released on 10 March 2006.

== Background and release ==
The song was written by Kristian Lundin, Sebastian Thott, Didrik Thott, Carl Bjorsell, and Jacques Veneruso, and produced by Lundin. Lundin had previously collaborated with Dion on "That's the Way It Is" and "I'm Alive", while Veneruso wrote "Sous le vent", "Tout l'or des hommes", and "Je ne vous oublie pas".

"Tous les secrets" premiered worldwide on 1 September 2005 in Poland, preceding its introduction in any French-speaking market. The track received positive reviews and became a successful single there, marking the first and only release from On ne change pas issued in Poland.

The digital download was released in Canada on 4 October 2005, the same day as the album. The CD single followed in March 2006 in Switzerland, Belgium, and France. "Tous les secrets" was also selected as a theme song for the animated adventure film Asterix and the Vikings, released in April 2006.

The CD single includes an English-language version of the track, titled "Let Your Heart Decide". Both versions were included on the Asterix and the Vikings soundtrack, issued on 3 April 2006.

== Commercial performance ==
"Tous les secrets" peaked at number seven in Quebec, number ten in Greece, number twenty in France, and number thirty-three in Belgium's Wallonia region.

== Music video ==
The music videos for the French and English versions incorporate scenes from the film. They premiered on 27 February 2006 and were later included on the Asterix and the Vikings DVD, released on 25 October 2006.

== Live performances ==
Dion promoted the song with a performance on the French television show Hit Machine, recorded in October 2005 and broadcast on 1 April 2006. A decade later, she performed "Tous les secrets" live during an acoustic medley on her Summer Tour 2016.

== Formats and track listing ==
- French CD single
1. "Tous les secrets" – 2:44
2. "Let Your Heart Decide" – 2:45

== Charts ==
Chart performance
Chart (2006)	Peak position
Belgium (Ultratop 50 Wallonia)	33
Canada AC (Radio & Records)	30
European Hot 100 Singles (Billboard)	63
CIS Airplay (TopHit)	125
France (SNEP)	20
Greece (IFPI)	10
Quebec Radio Songs (ADISQ)	7
Switzerland (Schweizer Hitparade)	75

== Release history ==
Release history
Region	Date	Format	Label	Ref.
Switzerland	10 March 2006	CD	Columbia	
Belgium	24 March 2006	CD	Columbia	
France	27 March 2006	CD	Columbia	
