= List of number-one singles of 1995 (France) =

This is a list of the French SNEP Top 100 Singles number-ones of 1995.

== Number-ones by week ==
=== Singles Chart ===
Week	Date	Artist	Single
1	January 7	Elton John	"Can You Feel the Love Tonight"
2	January 14	Elton John	"Can You Feel the Love Tonight"
3	January 21	Elton John	"Can You Feel the Love Tonight"
4	January 28	Elton John	"Can You Feel the Love Tonight"
5	February 4	Elton John	"Can You Feel the Love Tonight"
6	11 February	20 Fingers feat. Gillette	"Short Dick Man"
7	February 18	20 Fingers feat. Gillette	"Short Dick Man"
8	February 25	20 Fingers feat. Gillette	"Short Dick Man"
9	March 4	The Cranberries	"Zombie"
10	March 11	The Cranberries	"Zombie"
11	March 18	The Cranberries	"Zombie"
12	March 25	The Cranberries	"Zombie"
13	April 1	The Cranberries	"Zombie"
14	April 8	The Cranberries	"Zombie"
15	April 15	The Cranberries	"Zombie"
16	April 22	The Cranberries	"Zombie"
17	April 29	The Cranberries	"Zombie"
18	May 6	Céline Dion	"Pour que tu m'aimes encore"
19	May 13	Céline Dion	"Pour que tu m'aimes encore"
20	May 20	Céline Dion	"Pour que tu m'aimes encore"
21	May 27	Céline Dion	"Pour que tu m'aimes encore"
22	June 3	Céline Dion	"Pour que tu m'aimes encore"
23	June 10	Céline Dion	"Pour que tu m'aimes encore"
24	June 17	Céline Dion	"Pour que tu m'aimes encore"
25	June 24	Céline Dion	"Pour que tu m'aimes encore"
26	July 1	Scatman John	"Scatman (Ski Ba Bop Ba Dop Bop)"
27	July 8	Céline Dion	"Pour que tu m'aimes encore"
28	July 15	Céline Dion	"Pour que tu m'aimes encore"
29	July 22	Céline Dion	"Pour que tu m'aimes encore"
30	July 29	Céline Dion	"Pour que tu m'aimes encore"
31	August 5	Sacred Spirit	"Yeha-Noha"
32	August 12	Sacred Spirit	"Yeha-Noha"
33	August 19	Sacred Spirit	"Yeha-Noha"
34	August 26	Sacred Spirit	"Yeha-Noha"
35	September 2	Sacred Spirit	"Yeha-Noha"
36	September 9	Sacred Spirit	"Yeha-Noha"
37	September 16	Scatman John	"Scatman's World"
38	September 23	Mylène Farmer	"XXL"
39	September 30	Michael Jackson	"You Are Not Alone"
40	October 7	Michael Jackson	"You Are Not Alone"
41	October 14	Céline Dion	"Je sais pas"
42	October 21	Céline Dion	"Je sais pas"
43	October 28	Céline Dion	"Je sais pas"
44	November 4	Céline Dion	"Je sais pas"
45	November 11	Céline Dion	"Je sais pas"
46	November 18	Céline Dion	"Je sais pas"
47	November 25	Céline Dion	"Je sais pas"
48	December 2	Coolio feat. L.V.	"Gangsta's Paradise"
49	December 9	Coolio feat. L.V.	"Gangsta's Paradise"
50	December 16	Coolio feat. L.V.	"Gangsta's Paradise"
51	December 23	Coolio feat. L.V.	"Gangsta's Paradise"
52	December 30	Coolio feat. L.V.	"Gangsta's Paradise"

== See also ==
- 1995 in music
- List of number-one singles in France
- List of artists who reached number one on the French Singles Chart
