= On ne change pas =

Greatest hits album by Celine Dion
- Released: 30 September 2005
- Recorded: 1981–2005
- Genre: Pop
- Length: 135:29
- Language: French; English
- Label: Columbia; Epic
- Producer: René Angélil; Paul Baillargeon; Didier Barbelivien; Erick Benzi; David Foster; Jean-Jacques Goldman; Patrick Hampartzoumian; Daniel Hétu; Urs Peter Keller; David Kreuger; Marcel Lefebvre; Claude Lemay; Kristian Lundin; Per Magnusson; Eddy Marnay; Romano Musumarra; Christopher Neil; Aldo Nova; Rudi Pascal; Serge Perathoner; Jean Roussel; Atilla Şereftuğ; Jannick Top; Jacques Veneruso

Celine Dion chronology
Miracle (2004)	On ne change pas (2005)	D'elles (2007)

Singles from On ne change pas
- 1. "Je ne vous oublie pas" Released: 10 October 2005; 2. "Tous les secrets" Released: 13 March 2006; 3. "I Believe in You (Je crois en toi)" Released: 1 May 2006

On ne change pas (lit. 'We don't change') is the first comprehensive French-language greatest hits album by Canadian singer Celine Dion, released by Columbia Records and Epic Records on 30 September 2005. It includes songs recorded between 1981 and 2005, along with three new tracks, all of which were issued as singles: "Je ne vous oublie pas", "Tous les secrets", and "I Believe in You" (a duet with Il Divo). "Je ne vous oublie pas" reached number two in France and was certified gold, while the other singles peaked at numbers 20 and 30, respectively.

On ne change pas received positive reviews from music critics. Commercially, it reached number one in France and Belgium's Wallonia, and number two in Canada and Switzerland. The album was certified triple platinum in France and Canada, platinum in Belgium, and gold in Switzerland. In 2009, it was re-released under the title Best of – 3 CD (also promoted as Triple Best Of).

== Background ==
On 7 July 2005, celinedion.com announced that a new album presenting Dion's French-language greatest hits would be released in October 2005. The two‑CD compilation, titled On ne change pas, was planned to include previously unreleased material, among them the first single written by Jacques Veneruso, "Je ne vous oublie pas". On 22 August 2005, the track listing was revealed, and the album was scheduled for release on 3 October 2005 in Europe and 4 October 2005 in North America. However, in some European countries, On ne change pas was released earlier, on 30 September 2005. The music video for "Je ne vous oublie pas" premiered on television on 31 August 2005. It was filmed at the Royal Impérial Theatre in Montreal, Quebec, Canada on 29 July 2005 and directed by Didier Kerbrat, who had previously worked with Dion on the video for "Contre nature" in 2004.

== Singles ==
The first single, "Je ne vous oublie pas" was released on CD in France, Belgium and Switzerland on 10 October 2005, a week after the album. It included instrumental version of the song and "Sous le vent" recorded with Les 500 Choristes. The single debuted and peaked at number two, being held from the number-one position by Crazy Frog's hit, "Popcorn". "Je ne vous oublie pas" was certified Silver in France.

"Tous les secrets" had its worldwide premiere on 1 September 2005 in Poland, ahead of any French-speaking country. The song gathered great reviews and became a very successful single reaching no. 1 on RMF FM. Alas, it was the first and only single from On ne change pas in Poland. Then, in Spring 2006 it was released as a second single in Francophone territories and was featured in an animated movie, Asterix and the Vikings. The music video with the fragments from the film premiered on 27 February 2006. "Tous les secrets" CD single was issued in Francophone countries in Europe on 13 March 2006 and included English-language version of the song, titled "Let Your Heart Decide". The music video for "Let Your Heart Decide" was also released. Both versions of the song were featured on the film's soundtrack and the music videos were included on the Asterix and the Vikings DVD. "Tous les secrets" reached number twenty in France.

The third single, "I Believe in You" (duet with Il Divo) was released on a CD in France and Switzerland on 1 May 2005. The single contained another track from Il Divo, "Hasta Mi Final". Both songs were included on Il Divo's album, Ancora. The song reached number thirty in France and in June 2006, it was featured on the official 2006 FIFA World Cup album, called Voices from the FIFA World Cup. "I Believe in You" was also released in January 2006 in the United States as a promotional single from Ancora and reached number thirty-one on the Billboard's Adult Contemporary chart.

== Content ==
Sony Music released several versions of the album, all of which include three new songs: "Je ne vous oublie pas", "Tous les secrets", and "I Believe in You" (a duet with Il Divo). The standard edition was issued as a two‑CD set in a jewel case, while the collector's edition digipak includes a bonus DVD with thirty minutes of exclusive footage and the music video for "Je ne vous oublie pas". The North American edition features Dion's French‑language hits from the 1990s and 2000s, as well as many songs from the 1980s that established her career in Quebec, beginning with her 1981 debut single, "Ce n'était qu'un rêve". The European edition focuses on songs that became popular in France and also includes several rare tracks. It contains hits such as "Pour que tu m'aimes encore", "Je sais pas", "Un garçon pas comme les autres (Ziggy)", "Tout l'or des hommes", "S'il suffisait d'aimer", and "D'amour ou d'amitié", as well as the number‑one single "Sous le vent", previously available only on Garou's debut album, and "Ma Nouvelle-France", recorded for the 2004 film Battle of the Brave (Nouvelle-France).

In November 2005, the ultimate edition was released in Europe and Canada, containing three CDs and a bonus DVD in a longbox. It includes 50 songs recorded between 1981 and 2005, covering all of Dion's French‑language hits and various rare tracks. In late March 2006, a one‑disc edition was issued in Europe and Canada, featuring 19 greatest hits on a single CD. An accompanying On ne change pas DVD was also released in November 2005, containing Dion's French‑language music videos and bonus material. In November 2009, Best of – 3 CD (also promoted as Triple Best Of) was released in Francophone European countries, containing the three CDs from the ultimate edition.

== Promotion ==
In Canada, Dion appeared on Star Académie on 2 October 2005 and performed "Je ne vous oublie pas" live from the Las Vegas stage, while the contestants sang from the studio. On 11 December 2005, she performed the song on the Canadian show L'école des fans and sang several duets with the children.

Dion also visited France in early October 2005, during a break from A New Day..., and recorded various television appearances. On 7 October 2005, she appeared on Star Academy and performed "Je ne vous oublie pas" as well as two of her hits with the contestants: "Pour que tu m'aimes encore" and "On ne change pas". The episode became the most-watched French prime‑time program of the evening, attracting an average of 7,820,800 viewers and achieving a 36.8% audience share, with a peak of 9,080,000 viewers during the performance of "Pour que tu m'aimes encore".

Dion also performed "Je ne vous oublie pas" on Au Nom des Autres on 10 October 2005 and on Hit Machine on 15 October 2005. On 5 November 2005, she appeared on Les 500 Choristes Ensemble, performing several songs, including "Je ne vous oublie pas", "I Believe in You" with Il Divo, "S'il suffisait d'aimer", "Pour que tu m'aimes encore", and "L'envie" with Johnny Hallyday. The broadcast became the most-watched French prime‑time program of the evening, drawing an average of 7,870,720 viewers and a 36.7% audience share, setting a record for the show. Several of Dion's performances were later included on two Les 500 Choristes albums: 500 Choristes Avec.../Vol.1 (2005) and 500 Choristes Avec.../Vol.2 (2006).

On 25 December 2005, Dion performed "I Believe in You" with Il Divo on Vivement Dimanche, and on 27 December 2005 she sang "Je ne vous oublie pas" on Les Disques D'or. On 29 December 2005, she performed three songs on the Symphonic Show, including "Je ne vous oublie pas", "I Believe in You" with Il Divo, and "Le blues du businessman". The performance of "Tous les secrets" on Hit Machine, recorded in October 2005, was broadcast on 1 April 2006.

== Critical reception ==
Professional ratings
Review scores
Source	Rating
AllMusic	4/5 stars

The album received positive reviews. Rob Theakston of AllMusic wrote that "On ne change pas is without no doubt a companion piece to 1999's All the Way... A Decade of Song. Dion amassed quite a back catalog of French-language hits ranging from dance‑pop‑friendly numbers to her familiar ground of passionate, melodramatic ballads. For those unfamiliar with this portion of her career (or for those who don't speak French), getting past the roadblock of not being able to understand the subject material will lead to a greater, more holistic appreciation of the depth and prolific output of her career in such a short span... On the plus side there are a few new tracks including her duet with Il Divo, 'I Believe in You'."

== Commercial performance ==
In Canada, On ne change pas debuted at number two with sales of 34,000 copies. In its second week, the album remained at number two, which became its peak position, selling 16,000 units. In January 2006, On ne change pas was certified triple platinum in Canada for shipments of 300,000 copies. The album also topped the chart in Quebec for three weeks.

In France, the album spent seven consecutive weeks at number one and became the best‑selling compilation of 2005. It sold 109,000 copies in its first week and 71,000 in the second. On ne change pas was certified triple platinum in France and has sold over 790,000 copies there.

The album also reached number one for three consecutive weeks in Belgium's Wallonia and number two in Switzerland, and was certified platinum in Belgium and gold in Switzerland.

== Accolades ==
In 2005, Dion received the Chérie FM Star Honorary Award. In 2006, she was nominated for two Félix Awards: Female Vocalist of the Year and Most Popular Song of the Year for "Je ne vous oublie pas". She was also nominated for the NRJ Music Award for Francophone Female Artist of the Year.

== Track listing ==
Canadian standard edition (disc one)
No.	Title	Writer(s)	Producer(s)	Length
1.	"Je ne vous oublie pas"	Jacques Veneruso	Veneruso; Patrick Hampartzoumian	3:35
2.	"Tous les secrets"	Kristian Lundin; Sebastian Thott; Didrik Thott; Carl Björsell; Veneruso	Lundin	2:46
3.	"Pour que tu m'aimes encore"	Jean-Jacques Goldman	Goldman; Erick Benzi	4:14
4.	"S'il suffisait d'aimer"	Goldman	Goldman; Benzi	3:35
5.	"Sous le vent" (with Garou)	Veneruso	Benzi; Aldo Nova^{[a]}; Humberto Gatica^{[a]}	3:32
6.	"Tout l'or des hommes"	Veneruso	Benzi	3:01
7.	"Je sais pas"	Goldman; J. Kapler	Goldman; Benzi	4:32
8.	"On ne change pas"	Goldman	Goldman; Benzi	4:09
9.	"J'irai où tu iras" (with Jean-Jacques Goldman)	Goldman	Goldman; Benzi	3:26
10.	"Et je t'aime encore"	Goldman; Kapler	Benzi	3:27
11.	"Destin"	Goldman	Goldman; Benzi	4:15
12.	"Je lui dirai"	Goldman	Benzi	3:57
13.	"Les derniers seront les premiers"	Goldman	Goldman; Benzi	3:32
14.	"Vole"	Goldman	Goldman; Benzi	2:57
15.	"Ziggy (un garçon pas comme les autres)"	Luc Plamondon; Michel Berger	Jannick Top; Serge Perathoner	2:58
16.	"L'amour existe encore"	Plamondon; Riccardo Cocciante	Top; Perathoner	3:50
17.	"I Believe in You" (with Il Divo)	Jörgen Elofsson; Per Magnusson; David Kreuger; Matteo Saggese; Plamondon	Magnusson; Kreuger	4:01
Total length:				61:47

Canadian standard edition (disc two)
No.	Title	Writer(s)	Producer(s)	Length
1.	"Je danse dans ma tête"	Plamondon; Romano Musumarra	Musumarra	4:12
2.	"On traverse un miroir"	Isa Minoke; Robert Lafond	Nova	4:40
3.	"Partout je te vois"	Eddy Marnay; Nova	Nova	4:09
4.	"Le blues du businessman"	Plamondon; Berger	Top; Perathoner	4:31
5.	"Incognito"	Plamondon; Jean Roussel	Roussel	4:39
6.	"Lolita (trop jeune pour aimer)"	Plamondon; Daniel Lavoie	Roussel	4:19
7.	"Des mots qui sonnent"	Plamondon; Nova; Marty Simon	Top; Perathoner	3:56
8.	"La voix du bon Dieu"	Marnay	Marnay; René Angélil	3:22
9.	"D'amour ou d'amitié"	Marnay; Jean-Pierre Lang; Roland Vincent	Marnay; Rudi Pascal	4:00
10.	"Mon ami m'a quittée"	Marnay; Christian Loigerot; Thierry Geoffroy	Marnay; Pascal	3:01
11.	"Tellement j'ai d'amour pour toi"	Marnay; Hubert Giraud	Marnay; Pascal	2:58
12.	"Les chemins de ma maison"	Marna; Patrick Lemaître; Alain Bernard	Marnay; Pascal	4:13
13.	"Mélanie"	Marnay; Diane Juster	Angélil	3:48
14.	"Une colombe"	Marcel Lefebvre; Paul Baillargeon	Baillargeon; Lefebvre; Angélil	3:13
15.	"Ma chambre"	Jean-Pierre Ferland; Daniel Mercure	Roussel	4:14
16.	"Ne partez pas sans moi"	Nella Martinetti; Atilla Şereftuğ	Şereftuğ; Urs Peter Keller	3:07
17.	"Fais ce que tu voudras"	Marnay; René Grignon	Marnay	3:43
18.	"Quand on n'a que l'amour" (live)	Jacques Brel	Claude Lemay	3:48
19.	"Ce n'était qu'un rêve"	Thérèse Dion; Jacques Dion; Celine Dion	Daniel Hétu; Angélil	3:49
Total length:				73:42

Canadian / European complete edition (disc one)
No.	Title	Writer(s)	Producer(s)	Length
1.	"Je ne vous oublie pas"	Veneruso	Veneruso; Hampartzoumian	3:35
2.	"Tous les secrets"	Lundin; S. Thott; D. Thott; Björsell; Veneruso	Lundin	2:46
3.	"Sous le vent" (with Garou)	Veneruso	Benzi; Nova^{[a]}; Gatica^{[a]}	3:32
4.	"Tout l'or des hommes"	Veneruso	Benzi	3:01
5.	"Et je t'aime encore"	Goldman; Kapler	Benzi	3:27
6.	"Vole"	Goldman	Goldman; Benzi	2:57
7.	"Je lui dirai"	Goldman	Benzi	3:57
8.	"I Believe in You" (with Il Divo)	Elofsson; Magnusson; Kreuger; Saggese; Plamondon	Magnusson; Kreuger	4:01
9.	"Ma Nouvelle-France"	Plamondon; Patrick Doyle	Christopher Neil	3:11
10.	"Contre nature"	Veneruso	Benzi	4:10
11.	"En attendant ses pas"	Goldman	Goldman; Benzi	4:07
12.	"Le loup, la biche et le chevalier (une chanson douce)"	Maurice Pon; Henri Salvador	David Foster	3:13
13.	"La mémoire d'Abraham"	Goldman	Goldman; Benzi	3:49
14.	"Le monde est stone"	Plamondon; Berger	Top; Perathoner	3:40
15.	"Plus haut que moi" (with Mario Pelchat)	Marnay; Ken Cummings; Mark Blatte	Nova	4:18
16.	"Terre"	Benzi	Goldman; Benzi	4:17
Total length:				58:01

Canadian / European complete edition (disc two)
No.	Title	Writer(s)	Producer(s)	Length
1.	"Pour que tu m'aimes encore"	Goldman	Goldman; Benzi	4:14
2.	"Le blues du businessman"	Plamondon; Berger	Top; Perathoner	4:31
3.	"Zora sourit"	Goldman; Kapler	Goldman; Benzi	3:52
4.	"S'il suffisait d'aimer"	Goldman	Goldman; Benzi	3:35
5.	"Destin"	Goldman	Goldman; Benzi	4:15
6.	"Les derniers seront les premiers"	Goldman	Goldman; Benzi	3:32
7.	"Elle" (live)	Marnay; Baillargeon	Lemay	3:12
8.	"Le ballet"	Goldman	Goldman; Benzi	4:19
9.	"Des mots qui sonnent"	Plamondon; Nova; Simon	Top; Perathoner	3:56
10.	"On ne change pas"	Goldman	Goldman; Benzi	4:09
11.	"Je sais pas"	Goldman; Kapler	Goldman; Benzi	4:32
12.	"Ziggy (un garçon pas comme les autres)"	Plamondon; Berger	Top; Perathoner	2:58
13.	"Quand on n'a que l'amour" (live)	Brel	Lemay	3:48
14.	"Je danse dans ma tête"	Plamondon; Musumarra	Musumarra	4:12
15.	"L'amour existe encore"	Plamondon; Cocciante	Top; Perathoner	3:50
16.	"Dans un autre monde"	Goldman	Goldman; Benzi	4:37
17.	"Je ne veux pas"	Marnay; Musumarra	Musumarra	4:03
Total length:				67:35

Canadian / European complete edition (disc three)
No.	Title	Writer(s)	Producer(s)	Length
1.	"Partout je te vois"	Marnay; Nova	Nova	4:09
2.	"Incognito"	Plamondon; Roussel	Roussel	4:39
3.	"Lolita (trop jeune pour aimer)"	Plamondon; Lavoie	Roussel	4:19
4.	"La voix du bon Dieu"	Marnay	Marnay; Angélil	3:22
5.	"Mélanie"	Marnay; Juster	Angélil	3:48
6.	"Une colombe"	Lefebvre; Baillargeon	Baillargeon; Lefebvre; Angélil	3:13
7.	"Ma chambre"	Ferland; Mercure	Roussel	4:14
8.	"Fais ce que tu voudras"	Marnay; Grignon	Marnay	3:43
9.	"Ce n'était qu'un rêve"	T. Dion; J. Dion; C. Dion	Hétu; Angélil	3:49
10.	"D'amour ou d'amitié"	Marnay; Lang; Vincent	Marnay; Pascal	4:00
11.	"La religieuse"	Didier Barbelivien	Barbelivien	3:32
12.	"Mon ami m'a quittée"	Marnay; Loigerot; Geoffroy	Marnay; Pascal	3:01
13.	"Ne partez pas sans moi"	Martinetti; Şereftuğ	Şereftuğ; Keller	3:07
14.	"Les chemins de ma maison"	Marnay; Lemaître; Bernard	Marnay; Pascal	4:13
15.	"Trois heures vingt"	Marnay; Lemaître	Marnay; Pascal	3:41
16.	"Tellement j'ai d'amour pour toi"	Marnay; Giraud	Marnay; Pascal	2:58
17.	"Les oiseaux du bonheur"	Marnay; André Popp	Marnay; Pascal	3:43
Total length:				63:31

Canadian / European complete edition (disc four)
No.	Title	Director(s)	Length
1.	"Je ne vous oublie pas" (music video)	Didier Kerbrat	3:54
2.	"Si Céline m'etait contee" (video)	Laura Mayne-Kerbrat	24:31
Total length:			28:25

=== Notes ===
- ^{^a} signifies an additional producer
- The European standard edition excludes "La voix du bon Dieu", "Une colombe", "Mélanie", "Fais ce que tu voudras", "On traverse un miroir", "Incognito", "Lolita (trop jeune pour aimer)", "Partout je te vois", "Ma chambre", and "Des mots qui sonnent", and includes "Je ne veux pas", "Le ballet", "Zora sourit", "Dans un autre monde", "Contre nature", "Le loup, la biche et le chevalier (une chanson douce)", and "Ma Nouvelle-France".
- The 2006 one-disc edition contains 19 tracks, including "Medley Starmania".

== Personnel ==
- Olivia Ada Seba – background vocals
- F. Andresson – engineering, mixing
- R. Auclair – assistant engineer
- Jean-Philippe Audin – cello
- J. Bengtsson – flute
- M. Berntoft – guitars
- Carl Björsell – guitars, engineering, background vocals
- Thierry Blanchard – string arrangements
- Nathalie Carlucci – viola
- Hervé Cavelier – violin
- Marie-Céline Chroné – background vocals
- H. Colau – background vocals
- L. Colau – background vocals
- Laurent Coppola – drums
- Hélène Corbellari – violin
- C. Dauphin – viola
- G. Feuillette – background vocals
- Humberto Gatica – engineering
- Emmanuel Guerrero – piano, string arrangements
- Patrick Hampartzoumian – producer, engineering, mixing
- Jean-Marc Haroutiounian – bass
- Nana Hedin – background vocals
- Florence Hennequin – cello
- Il Divo – lead vocals
- U. & H. Janson – conducting
- David Kreuger – producer, arranger, programming
- François Lalonde – assistant engineer
- Kristian Lundin – producer, arranger, programming, mixing, background vocals
- Per Magnusson – producer, arranger, keyboards
- S. Makasso – background vocals
- Z. Makasso – background vocals
- C. Maubourguet – violin
- J. Mbida – background vocals
- A. M. Rakotofiringa – background vocals
- G. Seba – choral director
- Michel L. Seba – background vocals
- Stockholm Orchestra – orchestra
- Didrik Thott – background vocals
- Sebastian Thott – guitars, engineering
- Jacques Veneruso – producer, guitars

== Charts ==
=== Weekly charts ===
Weekly chart performance
Chart (2005)	Peak position
Belgian Albums (Ultratop Flanders)	33
Belgian Albums (Ultratop Wallonia)	1
Canadian Albums (Billboard)	2
Dutch Albums (Album Top 100)	59
European Albums (Music & Media)	46
Finnish Albums (Suomen virallinen lista)	30
French Albums (SNEP)	1
French Compilations (SNEP)	1
German Albums (Offizielle Top 100)	72
Greek Foreign Albums (IFPI)	11
Italian Albums (FIMI)	54
Polish Albums (ZPAV)	19
Quebec (ADISQ)	1
Swiss Albums (Schweizer Hitparade)	2

=== Year-end charts ===
2005 year-end chart performance
Chart (2005)	Position
Belgian Albums (Ultratop Wallonia)	4
French Compilations (SNEP)	1
Swiss Albums (Schweizer Hitparade)	60

2006 year-end chart performance
Chart (2006)	Position
French Compilations (SNEP)	8
Belgian Albums (Ultratop Wallonia)	62

2015 year-end chart performance
Chart (2015)	Position
Belgian Mid Price Albums (Ultratop Wallonia)	36

2016 year-end chart performance
Chart (2016)	Position
Belgian Mid Price Albums (Ultratop Wallonia)	13

2017 year-end chart performance
Chart (2017)	Position
Belgian Mid Price Albums (Ultratop Wallonia)	34

2018 year-end chart performance
Chart (2018)	Position
Belgian Mid Price Albums (Ultratop Wallonia)	33

== Certifications ==
Certifications
Region	Certification	Certified units/sales
Belgium (BRMA)	Platinum	50,000^{*}
Canada (Music Canada)	3× Platinum	300,000^{^}
France (SNEP)	3× Platinum	900,000^{*}
Switzerland (IFPI Switzerland)	Gold	20,000^{^}
^{*} Sales figures based on certification alone.^{^} Shipments figures based on certification alone.

== Best Of – 3 CD ==
In November 2009, Best Of – 3 CD was released in Francophone European countries, containing three CDs from the complete edition of On ne change pas. The album entered the chart in Wallonia (Belgium) in 2012 and peaked at number 73 in 2014. In France, Best Of – 3 CD debuted and peaked on the charts in 2016, reaching number one on the Back Catalog Albums Chart and number seven on the main albums chart. It also entered the charts in Switzerland in 2016, peaking at number nine on the Romandy chart and number 32 on the main Swiss albums chart.

=== Charts ===
Chart performance
Chart (2012–2016)	Peak position
Belgian Albums (Ultratop Wallonia)	73
French Albums (SNEP)	7
French Back Catalog Albums (SNEP)	1
Swiss Albums (Schweizer Hitparade)	32
Swiss Albums (Schweizer Hitparade Romandy)	9

== Release history ==
Release history
Region	Date	Label	Format	Catalog
Europe	30 September 2005	Columbia	2CD	82876726212
Europe	30 September 2005	Columbia	2CD/DVD	82876726222
United States	4 October 2005	Epic	2CD	E2K 97736
Canada	4 October 2005	Columbia	2CD	82876726242
Canada	4 October 2005	Columbia	2CD/DVD	82876726252
Europe	18 November 2005	Columbia	3CD/DVD	82876740692
Canada	29 November 2005	Columbia	3CD/DVD	82876756772
Japan	1 February 2006	SMEJ	2CD	EICP-590〜EICP-591
Europe	6 March 2006	Columbia	CD	828267877327
Canada	4 April 2006	Columbia	CD	82876787732
Europe	23 November 2009; Best Of – 3 CD	Columbia	3CD	88697550862
