= Les derniers seront les premiers =

Promotional single by Celine Dion

from the album Live à Paris
- Language: French
- Released: November 1996
- Recorded: October–November 1995
- Venue: Zénith (Paris)
- Genre: Pop
- Length: 3:53 (live version); 3:33 (album version)
- Label: Columbia
- Songwriter: Jean-Jacques Goldman
- Producers: Jean-Jacques Goldman; Erick Benzi

Audio
- "Les derniers seront les premiers" on YouTube

"Les derniers seront les premiers" (lit. 'The last will be first') is a song by Canadian singer Celine Dion from her thirteenth studio album, D'eux (1995). Written by Jean-Jacques Goldman and produced by Goldman and Erick Benzi, the track was later issued as a live promotional single in November 1996 from Dion's concert album Live à Paris. The live version entered airplay charts in several Francophone markets, reaching number three in Quebec, number 19 in France, and number 47 in Belgium's Wallonia region.

== Background and release ==
Dion recorded D'eux in November and December 1994 at the Méga Studio in Paris, France. Most of the album was written by Jean-Jacques Goldman, with production handled by Goldman and Erick Benzi.

A live version of "Les derniers seront les premiers", recorded during Dion's concerts at the Zénith Paris in October and November 1995 for Live à Paris, was released as a promotional single in November 1996. The song was later included on Dion's 2005 greatest hits compilation On ne change pas.

== Commercial performance ==
"Les derniers seront les premiers" entered airplay charts in several Francophone territories in November 1996. In Quebec, it debuted on 16 November 1996 and peaked at number three, remaining on the chart for 35 weeks. In France, the song reached number 19 in December 1996 in its fourth week on the airplay chart. In Belgium's Wallonia region, it peaked at number 47 on 29 November 1996.

== Music video ==
The live music video was filmed at the Zénith Paris during the D'eux Tour in October and November 1995. Directed by Gérard Pullicino, it was released in November 1996 to promote the Live à Paris CD and DVD. Jean-Jacques Goldman joined Dion on stage at the end of the performance. The video received a nomination for Video of the Year at the 1997 Félix Awards. It was later included on Dion's 2005 greatest hits DVD On ne change pas and in 2009 on the 15th anniversary edition of D'eux.

== Accolades ==
At the 1997 Félix Awards in Quebec, "Les derniers seront les premiers" received nominations for Most Popular Song of the Year and Video of the Year.

== Charts ==
Chart performance
Chart (1996)	Peak position
Belgium (Ultratop Airplay Flanders)	141
Belgium (Ultratop Airplay Wallonia)	47
France Airplay (SNEP)	19
Quebec Radio Songs (ADISQ)	3
