= J'attendais =

Single by Celine Dion

from the album Live à Paris
- Language: French
- B-side: "J'attendais" (album version)
- Released: 30 June 1997
- Recorded: October–November 1995
- Venue: Le Zénith (Paris)
- Genre: Pop
- Length: 4:58 (live version); 4:24 (album version)
- Label: Columbia
- Songwriter: Jean-Jacques Goldman
- Producers: Jean-Jacques Goldman; Erick Benzi

Celine Dion singles chronology
"Call the Man" (1997)	"J'attendais" (1997)	"Tell Him" (1997)

Music video
- "J'attendais" on YouTube

"J'attendais" (lit. 'I was waiting') is a song by Canadian singer Celine Dion from her thirteenth studio album, D'eux (1995). It was written by Jean-Jacques Goldman and produced by Goldman and Erick Benzi. A live version, included on the 1996 album Live à Paris, was issued as a single on 30 June 1997. It reached number 22 in Belgium's Wallonia, number 46 in France, and number 88 in Belgium's Flanders.

== Background and release ==
Dion recorded D'eux in November and December 1994 at the Méga Studio in Paris, France. Most songs were written by Jean-Jacques Goldman, and the album was produced by Goldman and Erick Benzi. The live version of "J'attendais" from Live à Paris was released as a single in France on 30 June 1997 and in Belgium on 4 August 1997.

== Commercial performance ==
In France, "J'attendais" reached number 46 in July 1997. In Belgium, it peaked at number 22 in Wallonia and number 88 in Flanders in August 1997.

== Music video ==
The official live music video was filmed at Le Zénith in Paris, France, during the D'eux Tour in October and November 1995. It was directed by Gérard Pullicino and released in June 1997 to promote the Live à Paris CD and DVD of the same name. In 2009, the video was included on the 15th anniversary edition of D'eux.

== Formats and track listing ==
- French CD single
1. "J'attendais" (live) – 4:58
2. "J'attendais" – 4:24

== Charts ==
Weekly chart performance
Chart (1997)	Peak position
Belgium (Ultratop 50 Flanders)	88
Belgium (Ultratop 50 Wallonia)	22
France (SNEP)	46

== Release history ==
Release history
Region	Date	Format	Label	Ref.
France	30 June 1997	CD	Columbia	
Belgium	4 August 1997	CD	Columbia	
