= Destin (song) =

Song by Celine Dion

from the album D'eux
- Language: French
- Released: 30 March 1995
- Recorded: November–December 1994
- Studio: Méga (Paris)
- Genre: Pop
- Length: 4:15
- Label: Columbia; Epic
- Songwriter: Jean-Jacques Goldman
- Producers: Jean-Jacques Goldman; Erick Benzi

Audio
- "Destin" on YouTube

"Destin" (lit. 'Destiny') is a song by Canadian singer Celine Dion from her thirteenth studio album, D'eux (1995). Written by Jean-Jacques Goldman and produced by Goldman and Erick Benzi, the track was not released as a single but became a radio hit in Quebec, Canada. It entered the airplay chart in January 1996 and peaked at number three.

== Background and release ==
Dion recorded D'eux in November and December 1994 at the Méga Studio in Paris, France. Most songs were written by Jean-Jacques Goldman, with production handled by Goldman and Erick Benzi.

Although not issued as a commercial single, "Destin" became popular on Quebec radio in early 1996. Dion performed the song frequently during her concert tours between 1995 and 2013. In 2005, it was included on her greatest hits compilation On ne change pas.

== Commercial performance ==
"Destin" entered the ADISQ Radio chart in Quebec on 20 January 1996 and peaked at number three. It remained on the chart for 37 weeks.

== Charts ==
1996 weekly chart performance
| Chart (1996) | Peak position |
|---|---|
| Quebec Radio Songs (ADISQ) | 3 |

2026 weekly chart performance
| Chart (2026) | Peak position |
|---|---|
| France (SNEP) | 179 |
