= Je sais pas =

Single by Celine Dion

from the album D'eux
- Language: French
- B-side: "La mémoire d'Abraham"
- Released: 21 August 1995
- Recorded: November–December 1994
- Studio: Méga (Paris)
- Genre: Pop
- Length: 4:33
- Label: Columbia
- Songwriters: Jean-Jacques Goldman; J. Kapler
- Producers: Jean-Jacques Goldman; Erick Benzi

Celine Dion singles chronology
"Pour que tu m'aimes encore" (1995)	"Je sais pas" (1995)	"Next Plane Out" (1995)

Music video
- "Je sais pas" on YouTube

"Je sais pas" (lit. 'I don't know') is a song by Canadian singer Celine Dion from her thirteenth studio album, D'eux (1995). It was written by Jean-Jacques Goldman and J. Kapler, and produced by Goldman and Erick Benzi. The song was issued as the album's second single on 21 August 1995 by Columbia Records. "Je sais pas" reached number one in France, Belgium's Wallonia, and Quebec, and received gold certifications in France and Belgium. Two music videos were created for the track, directed by Greg Masuak.

== Background and release ==
Dion recorded D'eux in November and December 1994 at the Méga Studio in Paris, France. Most songs were written by Jean-Jacques Goldman, with production handled by Goldman and Erick Benzi. "Je sais pas", written by Goldman and his brother J. Kapler, was selected as the second single. It was commercially released on 21 August 1995 in Belgium, on 2 October 1995 in France, and on 18 December 1995 in the Netherlands.

A live version of "Je sais pas" from Live à Paris was also issued as a single in the Netherlands on 12 May 1997. The English-language version, "I Don't Know", appeared on Falling into You in 1996. Dion performed "Je sais pas" regularly during her concerts, and in 2005 it was included on her greatest hits album, On ne change pas.

== Commercial performance ==
In France, "Je sais pas" topped the chart for seven weeks. On the 1995 year-end charts, it ranked number six on sales and number 10 on airplay. The song also spent four weeks at number one in Quebec and two weeks at number one in Belgium's Wallonia. It was certified gold in France and Belgium. On the European Hot 100 Singles, "Je sais pas" reached number seven in December 1995. In the Netherlands, the single entered the chart in January 1996 and peaked at number 34. In May 1997, a live version of "Je sais pas" from Live à Paris was released exclusively in the Netherlands, where it reached number 78.

== Music video ==
Two music videos were created for "Je sais pas" in 1995: the main non-singing version and an alternate performance (singing) version, both directed by Greg Masuak. The video received a nomination for Video of the Year at the 1996 Félix Awards in Quebec. In 2005, both versions were included on Dion's greatest hits DVD collection, On ne change pas. Dion's official YouTube channel uploaded only the alternate singing version in 2011. Edited segments of the non-singing video were later used as music videos for two English-language singles: "Next Plane Out" and "Call the Man".

== Accolades ==
At the 1996 Félix Awards in Quebec, "Je sais pas" was nominated for Most Popular Song of the Year and Video of the Year.

== Formats and track listing ==
- French 7-inch, 12-inch, and CD single
1. "Je sais pas" – 4:35
2. "La mémoire d'Abraham" – 3:51
- French CD maxi-single
1. "Je sais pas" – 4:35
2. "La mémoire d'Abraham" – 3:51
3. "Je danse dans ma tête" (live) – 4:27
- 1997 Dutch CD single
1. "Je sais pas" (live) – 4:26
2. "J'attendais" – 4:24
- 1997 Dutch CD maxi-single
1. "Je sais pas" (live) – 4:26
2. "J'attendais" (live) – 4:58
3. "J'attendais" – 4:24

== Charts ==
=== Weekly charts ===
Weekly chart performance
Chart (1995–1997)	Peak position
Belgium (Ultratop 50 Flanders)	39
Belgium (Ultratop 50 Wallonia)	1
European Hot 100 Singles (Music & Media)	7
France (SNEP)	1
Netherlands (Dutch Top 40 Tipparade)	6
Netherlands (Single Top 100)	34
Netherlands (Single Top 100) 1997 live version	78
Quebec Radio Songs (ADISQ)	1

=== Year-end charts ===
Year-end chart performance
Chart (1995)	Position
Belgium (Ultratop 50 Wallonia)	9
Belgium Francophone (Ultratop 50 Wallonia)	3
European Hot 100 Singles (Music & Media)	47
France (SNEP)	6

== Certifications ==
Certifications
Region	Certification	Certified units/sales
Belgium (BRMA)	Gold	25,000^{*}
France (SNEP)	Gold	250,000^{*}
^{*} Sales figures based on certification alone.

== Release history ==
Release history
Region	Date	Format	Version	Label	Ref.
Belgium	21 August 1995	CD	Original	Columbia	
France	2 October 1995	12-inch; CD	Original	Columbia	
Netherlands	18 December 1995	CD	Original	Columbia	
Netherlands	12 May 1997	CD	Live	Columbia	

== See also ==
- List of number-one singles of 1995 (France)
- Ultratop 40 number-one hits of 1995
