= J'irai où tu iras =

Song by Celine Dion and Jean-Jacques Goldman

from the album D'eux
- Language: French
- Released: 30 March 1995
- Recorded: November–December 1994
- Studio: Méga (Paris)
- Genre: Pop
- Length: 3:27
- Label: Columbia; Epic
- Songwriter: Jean-Jacques Goldman
- Producers: Jean-Jacques Goldman; Erick Benzi

Audio
- "J'irai où tu iras" on YouTube

"J'irai où tu iras" (lit. 'I'll go where you go') is a song by Canadian singer Celine Dion and French singer-songwriter Jean-Jacques Goldman from Dion's thirteenth studio album, D'eux (1995). Written by Goldman and co-produced with Erick Benzi, the track was not released as a single but became popular on Quebec radio, entering the airplay chart in May 1996 and peaking at number 14. In France, the song first appeared on the singles chart in 2017 and later reached number 39.

== Background and release ==
Dion recorded D'eux in November and December 1994 at the Méga Studio in Paris, France. Most of the album was written by Jean-Jacques Goldman, with production handled by Goldman and Erick Benzi.

"J'irai où tu iras" was recorded as a duet between Dion and Goldman. Although not issued as a single, it became popular on Quebec radio in mid‑1996. Dion performed the song regularly in her concerts between 1995 and 2013. In 2005, it was included on her greatest hits compilation On ne change pas.

== Commercial performance ==
"J'irai où tu iras" entered the ADISQ Radio chart in Quebec on 11 May 1996 and peaked at number 14. It remained on the chart for 14 weeks.

In July 2017, during Dion's 2017 tour, the song entered the French Singles chart for the first time, driven by digital sales. It re-entered the chart several times in subsequent years, eventually reaching number 39 in October 2019.

After streaming was incorporated into the singles chart, the song continued to appear there, re-peaking at number 39 in January 2024.

== Charts ==
=== Weekly charts ===
1996 weekly chart performance
Chart (1996)	Peak position
Quebec Radio Songs (ADISQ)	14

2017–2024 weekly chart performance
Chart (2017–2024)	Peak position
France (SNEP)	39

=== Year-end charts ===
2022 year-end chart performance
Chart (2022)	Position
France (SNEP)	199

2023 year-end chart performance
Chart (2023)	Position
France (SNEP)	140

2024 year-end chart performance
Chart (2024)	Position
France (SNEP)	145

2025 year-end chart performance
Chart (2025)	Position
France (SNEP)	150
