= Pour que tu m'aimes encore =

1995 single by Celine Dion

Single by Celine Dion

from the album D'eux
- Language: French
- B-side: "Pour que tu m'aimes encore" (instrumental)
- Released: 13 March 1995
- Recorded: November–December 1994
- Studio: Méga (Paris)
- Genre: Pop
- Length: 4:15
- Label: Columbia; Epic
- Songwriter: Jean-Jacques Goldman
- Producers: Jean-Jacques Goldman; Erick Benzi

Celine Dion singles chronology
"Calling You" (1994)	"Pour que tu m'aimes encore" (1995)	"Je sais pas" (1995)

Music video
- "Pour que tu m'aimes encore" on YouTube

"Pour que tu m'aimes encore" (lit. 'So that you'll love me again') is a song by Canadian singer Celine Dion from her thirteenth studio album, D'eux (1995). Written by Jean-Jacques Goldman and produced by Goldman and Erick Benzi, it was issued as the album's lead single on 13 March 1995 by Columbia and Epic Records. The song received positive reviews from music critics and won Song of the Year at the Victoires de la Musique and Most Popular Song of the Year at the Félix Awards. It became Dion's most successful French-language single and is widely regarded as her signature song. "Pour que tu m'aimes encore" topped the charts in France, Belgium's Wallonia, and Quebec, and became her first, and to date only, French-language single to enter the UK Singles Chart, where it reached the top 10. The accompanying music video was directed by Michel Meyer. According to the Guinness World Records, the song has sold 2.1 million copies in France and another 2.1 million units in Canada.

== Background and release ==
Dion recorded D'eux in November and December 1994 at the Méga Studio in Paris, France. Most songs were written by Jean-Jacques Goldman, and the production was handled by Goldman and Erick Benzi. "Pour que tu m'aimes encore" was selected as the lead single and released commercially on 13 March 1995 in France, followed two weeks later by Belgium. On 28 August 1995, it was issued in the United Kingdom, Ireland, Switzerland, and the Netherlands, in November 1995 in Sweden, and in October 1996 in Japan. The English-language version, "If That's What It Takes", was included on Falling into You in 1996. Dion often performed "Pour que tu m'aimes encore" during her concerts, and it was later included on her greatest hits albums, On ne change pas (2005) and My Love: Ultimate Essential Collection (2008).

== Critical reception ==
Writing for Dotmusic, James Masterton described the song as a "gorgeous ballad". Pan-European magazine Music & Media wrote, "It would be indecent to refuse this Jean-Jaques Goldman-written romantic ballad with a solid beat just because it's in French. Whatever the language, Dion always lets her heart speak". A reviewer from Music Week gave the track three out of five, noting, "You need the words for this slushy stuff so Dion's return to her native tongue will temper the chances of this song in the UK, beautifully sung though it is".

== Commercial performance ==
"Pour que tu m'aimes encore" became Dion's biggest French-language hit. It entered the chart in France in March 1995 and spent 12 weeks at number one. The single was certified platinum in August 1995. It also topped both the sales and airplay year-end charts of 1995 in France. In Belgium's Wallonia, "Pour que tu m'aimes encore" spent 15 weeks at number one, topped the 1995 year-end chart, and was certified platinum. In Quebec, it entered the chart on 25 March 1995 and reached number one for four weeks.

According to the Guinness World Records, the song has sold 2.1 million copies in France and another 2.1 million units in Canada as of May 2017. It also became her first French-language single to enter the top 10 in the United Kingdom, reaching number seven, and was certified silver there. Elsewhere, it peaked at number two in Belgium's Flanders and Iceland, number three in Sweden and the Netherlands, number four on the European Hot 100 Singles, number six in Ireland, number seven in Scotland, number 15 in Hungary, number 17 in Switzerland, number 30 in Austria, number 31 in Lithuania, and number 39 in Germany.

== Music video ==
The music video was directed by Michel Meyer and released in March 1995. It was nominated for Video of the Year at the Victoires de la Musique and the Félix Awards. In 2005, it was included on Dion's greatest hits DVD collection, On ne change pas. On 27 March 2020, the video was remastered in HD on Dion's official YouTube channel.

== Accolades ==
In France, the song received the Victoire de la Musique for Song of the Year, and won the Radio France Internationale Award for Francophone Council Song. In Quebec, it received the Félix Award for Most Popular Song of the Year. The music video was also nominated for Video of the Year at the Victoires de la Musique and the Félix Awards. In May 2017, the Guinness World Records recognized "Pour que tu m'aimes encore" as the Best-selling Single in Canada with 2.1 million units, and the Best-selling Single in France with another 2.1 million copies sold.

== Formats and track listing ==
- European 7-inch, 12-inch, and CD single
1. "Pour que tu m'aimes encore" – 4:15
2. "Pour que tu m'aimes encore" (instrumental) – 4:16
- European CD maxi-single #1
1. "Pour que tu m'aimes encore" – 4:15
2. "Pour que tu m'aimes encore" (instrumental) – 4:16
3. "Prière païenne" – 4:11
- European CD maxi-single #2
1. "Pour que tu m'aimes encore" – 4:15
2. "Pour que tu m'aimes encore" (instrumental) – 4:16
3. "Calling You" (live) – 4:04
- Japanese 3-inch CD single
1. "Pour que tu m'aimes encore" – 4:14
2. "Prière païenne" – 4:11
- UK cassette single
1. "Tu m'aimes encore (To Love Me Again)" – 4:15
2. "Show Some Emotion" – 4:11
- UK CD maxi-single #1
1. "Tu m'aimes encore (To Love Me Again)" – 4:15
2. "Prière païenne" – 4:11
3. "Un garçon pas comme les autres (Ziggy)" – 2:58
4. "Des mots qui sonnent" – 3:56
- UK CD maxi-single #2
1. "Tu m'aimes encore (To Love Me Again)" – 4:15
2. "Send Me a Lover" – 4:31
3. "Show Some Emotion" – 4:11
4. "The Last to Know" – 4:35

== Charts ==
=== Weekly charts ===
Weekly chart performance
Chart (1995–2020)	Peak position
Austria (Ö3 Austria Top 40)	30
Belgium (Ultratop 50 Flanders)	2
Belgium (Ultratop 50 Wallonia)	1
Europe (Eurochart Hot 100)	4
Europe (European Hit Radio)	24
Finland (Suomen virallinen radiosoittolista)	9
France (SNEP)	1
Germany (GfK)	39
Hungary (Rádiós Top 40)	15
Hungary (Single Top 40)	30
Iceland (Íslenski Listinn Topp 40)	2
Ireland (IRMA)	6
Israel (Israeli Singles Chart)	9
Lithuania (M-1)	31
Netherlands (Dutch Top 40)	3
Netherlands (Single Top 100)	4
Quebec Radio Songs (ADISQ)	1
Scottish Singles Sales (Official Charts)	7
Sweden (Sverigetopplistan)	3
Switzerland (Schweizer Hitparade)	17
UK Singles (Official Charts)	7
UK Airplay (Music Week)	8

=== Year-end charts ===
1995 year-end chart performance
Chart (1995)	Position
Belgium (Ultratop 50 Flanders)	8
Belgium (Ultratop 50 Wallonia)	1
Belgium Francophone (Ultratop 50 Wallonia)	1
Europe (Eurochart Hot 100)	13
France (SNEP)	1
Iceland (Íslenski Listinn Topp 40)	34
Netherlands (Dutch Top 40)	6
Netherlands (Single Top 100)	18
UK Singles (OCC)	89

1996 year-end chart performance
Chart (1996)	Position
Sweden (Topplistan)	35

=== Decade-end charts ===
Decade-end chart performance
Chart (1990–1999)	Position
France (SNEP)	4
Netherlands (Dutch Top 40)	56

== Certifications and sales ==
Certifications
Region	Certification	Certified units/sales
Belgium (BRMA)	Platinum	50,000^{*}
Canada (Music Canada)	Platinum	2,100,000
France (SNEP)	Platinum	2,100,000
United Kingdom (BPI)	Silver	200,000^{‡}
^{*} Sales figures based on certification alone.^{‡} Sales+streaming figures based on certification alone.

== Release history ==
Release history
Region	Date	Format	Label	Ref.
France	13 March 1995	12-inch; CD	Columbia	
United Kingdom	28 August 1995	Cassette; CD #1	Epic	
United Kingdom	4 September 1995	CD #2	Epic	
Japan	21 October 1996	3-inch CD	SMEJ	

== See also ==
- List of number-one singles of 1995 (France)
- List of UK top-ten singles in 1995
- Ultratop 40 number-one hits of 1995
