= Au cœur du stade (video) =

Video by Celine Dion
- Released: 30 August 1999
- Recorded: 19–20 June 1999
- Venue: Stade de France (Paris)
- Genre: Pop
- Length: 117:00
- Languages: French; English
- Label: Columbia
- Director: Gérard Pullicino
- Producer: Vito Luprano

Celine Dion chronology
...Live in Memphis 1997 (1998)	Au cœur du stade (1999)	All the Way... A Decade of Song & Video (2001)

Au cœur du stade (lit. 'In the heart of the stadium') is the fifth home video by Canadian singer Celine Dion, released on 30 August 1999 by Columbia Records. The 90‑minute concert was filmed in June 1999 at the Stade de France in Paris during the Let's Talk About Love World Tour. Dion performed two consecutive sold‑out shows, each attended by more than 90,000 spectators, bringing the combined audience to over 180,000. The release was certified diamond in France.

== Content ==
During the concerts, Dion performed "J'irai où tu iras" with Jean-Jacques Goldman. "To Love You More" includes a violin solo by Taro Hakase, while Diana King appears on screen during "Treat Her Like a Lady". The setlist also incorporates several songs associated with the Bee Gees, including "Stayin' Alive" and "You Should Be Dancing". A video duet of "Tell Him" with Barbra Streisand was shown during the concerts but omitted from the DVD.

The DVD provides behind‑the‑scenes material related to the creation of S'il suffisait d'aimer and Let's Talk About Love. It also includes an appearance by Sir George Martin and rare footage of Dion, Streisand, David Foster, and lyricist Linda Thompson discussing "Tell Him". The full "Tell Him" music video is included as a bonus.

A CD edition of the concert was released separately.

== Commercial performance ==
Au cœur du stade received a diamond certification in France in 2001 for sales exceeding 100,000 copies.

== Track listing ==
No.	Title	Writer(s)	Length
1.	"Intro"
2.	"Let's Talk About Love"	Bryan Adams; Jean-Jacques Goldman; Eliot Kennedy	7:38
3.	"Dans un autre monde"	Goldman	4:14
4.	"Je sais pas"	Goldman; J. Kapler	4:23
5.	"The Reason"	Carole King; Mark Hudson; Greg Wells	5:00
6.	"Je crois toi"	Goldman	4:35
7.	"To Love You More" (with Taro Hakase)	David Foster; Junior Miles	4:54
8.	"Treat Her Like a Lady" (with Diana King)	Diana King; Andy Marvel; Billy Mann; Celine Dion	4:05
9.	"Terre"	Erick Benzi	4:12
10.	"J'irai où tu iras" (with Jean-Jacques Goldman)	Goldman	3:48
11.	"S'il suffisait d'aimer"	Goldman	3:54
12.	"On ne change pas"	Goldman	4:21
13.	"I'm Your Angel" (with Barnev Valsaint)	R. Kelly	4:54
14.	"The Power of Love"	Gunther Mende; Candy DeRouge; Jennifer Rush; Mary Susan Applegate	4:21
15.	"Acoustic medley": "Ce n'était qu'un rêve"; "D'amour ou d'amitié"; "Mon ami m'a quittée"; "L'amour existe encore"; "Ziggy"	Thérèse Dion; Celine Dion; Jacques Dion; Eddy Marnay; Jean-Pierre Lang; Roland Vincent; Christian Loigerot; Thierry Geoffroy; Luc Plamondon; Riccardo Cocciante; Michel Berger	10:43
16.	"Love Can Move Mountains"	Diane Warren	5:26
17.	"Stayin' Alive" / "You Should Be Dancing"	Barry Gibb; Robin Gibb; Maurice Gibb	4:25
18.	"Pour que tu m'aimes encore"	Goldman	4:13
19.	"My Heart Will Go On"	James Horner; Will Jennings	4:37

Bonus features
No.	Title	Length
1.	"Behind the scenes: recording of S'il suffisait d'aimer"	25:00
2.	"Behind the scenes: recording of Let's Talk About Love"	56:00
3.	"Construction of the stage"	0:56
4.	"Acoustic medley" (karaoke)	11:07

== Charts ==
Chart performance
Chart (1999–2016)	Peak position
Dutch Music DVD (MegaCharts)	6
French Music DVD (SNEP)	5

== Certifications ==
Certifications
Region	Certification	Certified units/sales
France (SNEP)	Diamond	100,000^{*}
^{*} Sales figures based on certification alone.

== Release history ==
Release history
Region	Date	Label	Format	Catalog
Europe	30 August 1999	Columbia	VHS	2009393
Europe	30 August 1999	Columbia	DVD	2009399
Asia	1999	Columbia	VCD	M2VCD200939
Canada	30 September 1999	Columbia	VHS	2009393
Canada	20 November 2001	Columbia	DVD	2009399
