= Nouvelle France (disambiguation) =

Nouvelle France (French: New France; a.k.a. French North America) was a colonial possession of France in North America.

Nouvelle France or variant, may also refer to:

== Historical topics ==
- Canada (New France), a French colony; the portion of Nouvelle France frequently meant by the term "Nouvelle France"
- Apostolic Vicariate of Nouvelle-France of the Roman Catholic Church in the colony of Canada
- Kingdom of Araucanía and Patagonia, South America; also called "Nouvelle France"
- Compagnie de la Nouvelle France, a French colonial syndicate with a monopoly on the fur trade in New France

== Other uses ==
- Nouvelle-France (film), a 2004 historical romance film
  - Nouvelle-France (soundtrack), a soundtrack album for the eponymous film
- Productions Nouvelle France, a Canadian record label
- Tour de la Nouvelle-France, a former pro-cycling stage race in Canada

== See also ==
- Ma Nouvelle-France, the theme song for the 2004 film Nouvelle-France
- Nouvelle (disambiguation)
- France (disambiguation)
- New France (disambiguation) (French: Nouvelle France)
