= New France, Nova Scotia =

New France, Nova Scotia may refer to:

- New France, Antigonish, Nova Scotia
- New France, Digby, Nova Scotia

== See also ==
- New France (disambiguation)
- Nova Scotia (disambiguation)
