= Au cœur du stade =

Live album by Celine Dion
- Released: 27 August 1999
- Recorded: 19–20 June 1999
- Venue: Stade de France (Paris)
- Genre: Pop
- Length: 64:28
- Languages: French; English
- Labels: Columbia; Epic

Celine Dion chronology
These Are Special Times (1998)	Au cœur du stade (1999)	All the Way... A Decade of Song (1999)

Au cœur du stade (lit. 'In the heart of the stadium') is the fourth live album by Canadian singer Celine Dion, released by Columbia Records on 27 August 1999. It was recorded during two sold‑out concerts at the Stade de France in Paris in June 1999, held during a peak period of Dion's international popularity. The shows drew a combined audience of over 180,000 spectators, making them among the largest concerts of her career.

The album contains primarily French‑language material, largely from S'il suffisait d'aimer (1998), along with live performances of internationally known songs such as "My Heart Will Go On" and "Let's Talk About Love". Au cœur du stade achieved commercial success in several Francophone markets and received multiple certifications, including double platinum in France, platinum in Belgium and Switzerland, and gold in Canada.

== Content ==
Au cœur du stade was recorded at the Stade de France in Paris during Dion's concerts on 19 and 20 June 1999, which formed part of the European leg of the Let's Talk About Love Tour. The concerts attracted a combined audience of over 180,000 people and received extensive coverage in French media.

The album includes live renditions of several songs from S'il suffisait d'aimer, such as "Dans un autre monde", "Je sais pas", and the title track. It also features performances of Dion's earlier French‑language hits, including "Ce n'était qu'un rêve", "D'amour ou d'amitié", and "Mon ami m'a quittée", arranged for the stadium setting. English‑language songs such as "Let's Talk About Love" and "My Heart Will Go On" were also part of the setlist.

The CD edition presents a selection of the concert material, while the full performance—featuring additional songs and behind‑the‑scenes footage—was released later in 1999 on the Au cœur du stade DVD. Promotion for the album included the release of the live video for "Dans un autre monde", which received rotation on French music television channels.

== Critical reception ==
Professional ratings
Review scores
Source	Rating
AllMusic	2.5/5 stars

Au cœur du stade received generally positive commentary from reviewers. Critics noted that the album presented a different aspect of Dion's artistry compared with her English‑language releases. Jose F. Promis of AllMusic wrote that the recording focused on Dion's French‑language repertoire and highlighted material that was particularly popular with Francophone audiences, including "Je sais pas" and "Ziggy". He contrasted the album with Live à Paris, describing Au cœur du stade as a performance that balanced adult contemporary ballads with more pop‑ and rock‑oriented songs, such as "Terre", "Dans un autre monde", and "J'irai où tu iras".

Promis also noted that the "Acoustic Medley" consisted of five full‑length songs rather than abbreviated excerpts, and that much of the setlist drew from Dion's studio album S'il suffisait d'aimer. He concluded that the album served as a representative document of Dion's live performances during this period, and considered it a notable release for fans and collectors of her French‑language work.

== Commercial performance ==
Au cœur du stade achieved significant commercial success across Francophone markets. In France, it was certified double platinum by the SNEP for shipments exceeding 600,000 copies, reflecting Dion's continued commercial strength in the country following S'il suffisait d'aimer. The album also performed strongly in Belgium and Switzerland, earning platinum certifications in both markets, and was certified gold in Canada.

In terms of chart performance, Au cœur du stade reached number one for four weeks in Switzerland, two weeks in France, and one week in both Belgium's Wallonia and Quebec. In Belgium's Flanders, it peaked at number three, and in Canada it reached number 15.

Outside Francophone regions, the album entered the top 40 in several European countries, reaching number 18 in Austria, number 23 in the Netherlands, and number 37 in both Germany and Hungary. On the European Top 100 Albums chart, Au cœur du stade peaked at number nine.

== Track listing ==
No.	Title	Writer(s)	Length
1.	"Let's Talk About Love"	Bryan Adams; Jean-Jacques Goldman; Eliot Kennedy	7:40
2.	"Dans un autre monde"	Goldman	4:25
3.	"Je sais pas"	Goldman; J. Kapler	5:47
4.	"Je crois toi"	Goldman	4:36
5.	"Terre"	Erick Benzi	4:26
6.	"J'irai où tu iras" (with Jean-Jacques Goldman)	Goldman	4:06
7.	"S'il suffisait d'aimer"	Goldman	5:10
8.	"On ne change pas"	Goldman	6:03
9.	"Medley acoustique": "Ce n'était qu'un rêve"; "D'amour ou d'amitié"; "Mon ami m'a quittée"; "L'amour existe encore"; "Ziggy"	Thérèse Dion; Celine Dion; Jacques Dion; Eddy Marnay; Jean-Pierre Lang; Roland Vincent; Thierry Geoffroy; Christian Loigerot; Luc Plamondon; Riccardo Cocciante; Michel Berger	11:33
10.	"Pour que tu m'aimes encore"	Goldman	5:20
11.	"My Heart Will Go On"	James Horner; Will Jennings	5:22
Total length:			64:28

== Charts ==
=== Weekly charts ===
Weekly chart performance
Chart (1999)	Peak position
Austrian Albums (Ö3 Austria)	18
Belgian Albums (Ultratop Flanders)	3
Belgian Albums (Ultratop Wallonia)	1
Canadian Albums (Billboard)	15
Dutch Albums (Album Top 100)	23
European Albums (Music & Media)	9
French Albums (SNEP)	1
German Albums (Offizielle Top 100)	37
Hungarian Albums (MAHASZ)	37
Portuguese Albums (AFP)	11
Quebec (ADISQ)	1
Swiss Albums (Schweizer Hitparade)	1
UK Albums (OCC)	146

=== Year-end charts ===
Year-end chart performance
Chart (1999)	Position
Belgian Albums (Ultratop Flanders)	45
Belgian Albums (Ultratop Wallonia)	15
Belgian Francophone Albums (Ultratop Wallonia)	11
European Albums (Music & Media)	90
French Albums (SNEP)	19
Swiss Albums (Schweizer Hitparade)	47

== Certifications ==
Certifications
Region	Certification	Certified units/sales
Belgium (BRMA)	Platinum	50,000^{*}
Canada (Music Canada)	Gold	50,000^{^}
France (SNEP)	2× Platinum	600,000^{*}
Switzerland (IFPI Switzerland)	Platinum	50,000^{^}
^{*} Sales figures based on certification alone.^{^} Shipments figures based on certification alone.

== Release history ==
Release history
Region	Date	Label	Format	Catalog
Europe	27 August 1999	Columbia	CD; cassette	495240 2; 495240 4
Canada	14 September 1999	Columbia	CD	80438
Japan	25 October 2000	SMEJ	CD	ESCA-8239

== See also ==
- List of number-one singles of 1999 (France)
