= I'm Your Angel =

Single by Celine Dion and R. Kelly

from the album These Are Special Times and R.
- B-side: "S'il suffisait d'aimer"
- Released: 13 October 1998
- Recorded: 1998
- Studio: Battery Studios; Morin-Heights; Cove City Sound; Dream Factory; Right Track
- Genre: R&B; pop; soul; gospel
- Length: 5:31
- Label: Columbia; Epic; Jive
- Songwriter: R. Kelly
- Producer: R. Kelly

Celine Dion singles chronology
"Zora sourit" (1998)	"I'm Your Angel" (1998)	"S'il suffisait d'aimer" (1998)

R. Kelly singles chronology
"Half on a Baby" (1998)	"I'm Your Angel" (1998)	"Home Alone" (1998)

Audio
- "I'm Your Angel" on YouTube

"I'm Your Angel" is a duet recorded by Celine Dion and R. Kelly for Dion's These Are Special Times and Kelly's R. albums. Written and produced by Kelly, it was released on 13 October 1998 as a single to promote both projects. The song became a major commercial success, reaching number one on the Billboard Hot 100 in the United States and earning a platinum certification from the Recording Industry Association of America (RIAA). Internationally, it also performed well, reaching the top five in the United Kingdom and Ireland. The song was later included on Dion's greatest hits albums All the Way... A Decade of Song (1999) and My Love: Essential Collection (2008), and on Kelly's compilation album The R. in R&B Collection, Vol. 1 (2003).

== Critical reception ==
Chuck Taylor from Billboard praised "I'm Your Angel". He wrote that "this wonderfully restrained ballad delights with the most graceful vocal performances either of these artists has ever offered to radio". Taylor added that "what raises the roof is the tune's elegant, epic instrumental base, which includes sweeping strings, a soulful choir, and gentle but determined percussive drive". He concluded that it "sells big at the bridge, where the instrumentation drops and Kelly and Dion harmonize in a gorgeous minor key – it truly makes the song". Launch Yahoo wrote: "The ballad to beat all ballads is his duet with Celine Dion, 'I'm Your Angel,' which, were it not released the same week, could no doubt top the charts". Stephen Thomas Erlewine of AllMusic described it as a standout on R. and called it a "soaring ballad".

A mixed review came from Entertainment Weekly editor Chris Willman: "Dion's earnest take on Vietnam-era Lennon is howler No. 1. No. 2 is her duet with R. Kelly, 'I'm Your Angel,' a slice of squishy-hearted pseudo gospel that might better be called 'Touched by a Marketing VP'". David Browne of EW wrote: "By the time R. winds up — with 'I Believe I Can Fly' and 'I'm Your Angel,' a belt-by-numbers duet with Dion — Kelly has realized his crossover dream". Rob Sheffield of Rolling Stone wrote: "Every guest star who enters Kelly's parlor emerges better for the experience — even Celine Dion, the human anti-NAFTA petition whose dancing on the VH1 Divas special cried out for stricter work-visa controls".

== Commercial performance ==
The song proved commercially successful in the United States and worldwide. It peaked at number one on the Billboard Hot 100 for six weeks, and was the first number one under Billboard's new charting method that included airplay-only tracks. It remains both artists' most recent US number one single as of 2026. It also spent 12 weeks at number one on the Hot Adult Contemporary Tracks, reached number one on the Hot 100 Singles Sales for six weeks, and number 22 on the Billboard Hot 100 Airplay. "I'm Your Angel" also became a top 10 hit in several European countries, including the United Kingdom, Ireland, Switzerland, the Netherlands, and Sweden.

"I'm Your Angel" has sold over 1,550,000 copies in the United States and was certified platinum by the RIAA. The single was also certified gold in Australia for 35,000 copies shipped, and silver in the United Kingdom for 200,000 copies shipped.

== Music video ==
The "I'm Your Angel" music video, directed by Bille Woodruff, premiered on 19 October 1998. Two versions were created: one showing both artists in the recording studio, and one without those scenes. The version without studio footage was included on Dion's All the Way... A Decade of Song & Video DVD. R. Kelly's daughter Joann Kelly appears in the video.

== Live performances ==
Dion performed "I'm Your Angel" during the Let's Talk About Love World Tour—a rendition included on the Au cœur du stade DVD—and again on the Taking Chances World Tour.

== Accolades ==
The single was nominated at the 41st Annual Grammy Awards for Best Pop Collaboration with Vocals, but lost to "I Still Have That Other Girl" by Elvis Costello and Burt Bacharach.

== Removal ==
On 14 January 2019, following Lady Gaga's removal of "Do What U Want", Dion, through her management, had the song withdrawn from her own releases and its video taken down from streaming services in response to renewed allegations of sexual misconduct and abuse against R. Kelly. However, the song remains available on streaming services on R. Kelly's own releases.

== Formats and track listing ==
- Australian CD single
1. "I'm Your Angel" (radio version) – 4:49
2. "I Can't Sleep Baby (If I)" – 5:31
3. "Christmas Eve" – 4:16
4. "S'il suffisait d'aimer" – 3:35
- European CD single
1. "I'm Your Angel" (radio version) – 4:49
2. "S'il suffisait d'aimer" – 3:35
- European CD maxi-single
1. "I'm Your Angel" (radio version) – 4:49
2. "S'il suffisait d'aimer" – 3:35
3. "I Can't Sleep Baby (If I)" – 5:31
- Japanese CD single
1. "I'm Your Angel" (radio version) – 4:49
2. "I Can't Sleep Baby (If I)" – 5:31
3. "Christmas Eve" – 4:16
- UK cassette single
1. "I'm Your Angel" (radio version) – 4:49
2. "I Can't Sleep Baby (If I)" – 5:31
3. "Je crois toi" – 5:05
- UK CD single #1
1. "I'm Your Angel" (radio version) – 4:49
2. "Je crois toi" – 5:05
3. "My Heart Will Go On" – 4:40
- UK CD single #2
1. "I'm Your Angel" (radio version) – 4:49
2. "I Can't Sleep Baby (If I)" – 5:31
3. "To Love You More" (Tony Moran I'll be waiting... vocal mix) – 9:27
- US 7-inch, 12-inch, cassette, and CD single
1. "I'm Your Angel" (album version) – 5:31

== Charts ==
=== Weekly charts ===
Weekly chart performance
Chart (1998–1999)	Peak position
Australia (ARIA)	31
Austria (Ö3 Austria Top 40)	13
Belgium (Ultratop 50 Flanders)	26
Belgium (Ultratop 50 Wallonia)	33
Canada Top Singles (RPM)	11
Canada Adult Contemporary (RPM)	1
Canada CHR (BDS)	14
Canada (Canadian Singles Chart) Import-only single	37
Europe (European Hot 100 Singles)	5
France (SNEP)	97
Finland (Suomen virallinen radiosoittolista)	9
Germany (GfK)	14
Greece (IFPI)	10
Hungary (Rádiós Top 40)	15
Iceland (Íslenski Listinn Topp 40)	7
Ireland (IRMA)	8
Netherlands (Dutch Top 40)	8
Netherlands (Single Top 100)	9
New Zealand (Recorded Music NZ)	5
Norway (VG-lista)	11
Poland Airplay (Music & Media)	7
Quebec Radio Songs (ADISQ)	5
Scottish Singles Sales (Official Charts)	7
Sweden (Sverigetopplistan)	10
Switzerland (Schweizer Hitparade)	7
UK Singles (Official Charts)	3
UK Airplay (Music Week)	24
US Billboard Hot 100	1
US Adult Contemporary (Billboard)	1
US Adult Pop Airplay (Billboard)	28
US Hot R&B/Hip-Hop Songs (Billboard)	5
US Pop Airplay (Billboard)	17
US Top 40 Tracks (Billboard)	21

=== Year-end charts ===
1998 year-end chart performance
Chart (1998)	Position
Australia (ARIA)	72
Canada Adult Contemporary (RPM)	22
Netherlands (Dutch Top 40)	126
Sweden (Hitlistan)	70
UK Singles (OCC)	62
US Adult Contemporary (Billboard)	47

1999 year-end chart performance
Chart (1999)	Position
Canada Top Singles (RPM)	92
Canada Adult Contemporary (RPM)	25
Europe (European Hot 100 Singles)	97
Netherlands (Dutch Top 40)	106
Netherlands (Single Top 100)	72
US Billboard Hot 100	16
US Adult Contemporary (Billboard)	8
US Adult Top 40 (Billboard)	67
US Hot R&B/Hip-Hop Singles & Tracks (Billboard)	66
US Mainstream Top 40 (Billboard)	73

=== Decade-end charts ===
Decade-end chart performance
Chart (1990–1999)	Position
US Billboard Hot 100	50

== Certifications and sales ==
Certifications
Region	Certification	Certified units/sales
Australia (ARIA)	Gold	35,000^{^}
United Kingdom (BPI)	Silver	263,000
United States (RIAA)	Platinum	1,550,000
^{^} Shipments figures based on certification alone.

== Release history ==
Release history
Region	Date	Format	Label	Ref.
United States	13 October 1998	Contemporary hit radio	Jive	
Belgium	9 November 1998	CD	Columbia	
Japan	11 November 1998	Mini CD	SMEJ	
United Kingdom	16 November 1998	Cassette; CD	Epic	
United States	17 November 1998	7-inch vinyl; 12-inch vinyl; cassette; CD	Jive	

== See also ==
- 1998 in British music
- Billboard Year-End Hot 100 singles of 1999
- List of Billboard Hot 100 number-one singles of 1998
- List of Billboard Hot 100 number-one singles of 1999
- List of Billboard Hot 100 number-one singles of the 1990s
- List of Billboard Hot 100 top 10 singles in 1998
- List of Billboard Hot 100 top 10 singles in 1999
- List of number-one adult contemporary singles of 1998 (U.S.)
- List of number-one adult contemporary singles of 1999 (U.S.)
- List of UK top 10 singles in 1998
