= On ne change pas (video) =

Video by Celine Dion
- Released: 18 November 2005
- Recorded: 1986–2005
- Genre: Pop
- Length: 174:00
- Language: French
- Labels: Columbia; Epic

Celine Dion chronology
All the Way... A Decade of Song & Video (2001)	On ne change pas (2005)	Live in Las Vegas: A New Day... (2007)

On ne change pas (lit. 'We do not change') is the seventh home video by Canadian singer Celine Dion, released on 18 November 2005 by Columbia Records and Epic Records. The collection assembles nearly two decades of Dion's French‑language music videos, many of which appeared on DVD for the first time. Spanning recordings from 1986 to 2005, it also includes more than an hour of previously unreleased bonus material. The release followed Dion's first comprehensive French‑language greatest hits album, also titled On ne change pas.

== Content ==
The DVD presents 17 music videos recorded over a 19‑year period, beginning with 1986's "Fais ce que tu voudras" and continuing through to 2005's "Je ne vous oublie pas". The selection traces Dion's evolution as a French‑language artist and reflects her collaborations with a wide range of directors and songwriters across the late 1980s, 1990s, and early 2000s.

Beyond the main program, the DVD includes more than an hour of supplementary material, such as live performances, behind‑the‑scenes footage from concerts and video shoots, and content documenting the creation of several of Dion's French‑language albums. It also includes the music videos for "Ma Nouvelle-France", "Valse adieu", and an alternate version of "Je sais pas".

== Commercial performance ==
On ne change pas debuted at number five on the French Music DVD chart and remained on the listing for 30 weeks. It was later certified triple platinum in France for sales exceeding 60,000 copies. Internationally, the video also reached number 11 on the Italian Music DVD chart.

== Track listing ==
Music videos
No.	Title	Director(s)	Length
1.	"L'amour existe encore"	Alain DesRochers
2.	"Je danse dans ma tête"	DesRochers
3.	"Ziggy"	Lewis Furey
4.	"Des mots qui sonnent"	DesRochers
5.	"Lolita (trop jeune pour aimer)"	Jacques Payette
6.	"Incognito"	Payette
7.	"Fais ce que tu voudras"	François Girard
8.	"Pour que tu m'aimes encore"	Michel Meyer
9.	"Je sais pas"	Greg Masuak
10.	"Zora sourit"	Yannick Saillet
11.	"S'il suffisait d'aimer"	Saillet
12.	"On ne change pas"	Gilbert Namiand
13.	"Sous le vent" (with Garou)	Istan Rozumny
14.	"Tout l'or des hommes"	Saillet
15.	"Et je t'aime encore"	Saillet
16.	"Contre nature"	Didier Kerbrat
17.	"Je ne vous oublie pas"	Kerbrat

Bonus: concerts and backstage
No.	Title	Director(s)	Length
18.	"Tomber" / "Ten days" (live in Bercy with Garou and Gérald de Palmas)	Gérard Pullicino
19.	"Les derniers seront les premiers" (live in Paris with Jean-Jacques Goldman)	Pullicino
20.	"Quand on n'a que l'amour" (live in Paris)	Pullicino
21.	"Behind the scenes of Au cœur du stade"	Pullicino
22.	"Behind the scenes of Live à Paris"	Pullicino

Bonus: behind the scenes of albums and music videos
No.	Title	Director(s)	Length
23.	"S'il suffisait d'aimer"	Saillet
24.	"1 fille & 4 types"	Saillet
25.	"Contre nature"	Laura Mayne-Kerbrat
26.	"Si Céline m'était contée"	Mayne-Kerbrat
27.	"Je sais pas" (version 2)	Masuak
28.	"Valse adieu"	Saillet
29.	"Ma Nouvelle-France"	Jean Beaudin

== Charts ==
=== Weekly charts ===
Weekly chart performance
Chart (2005–2007)	Peak position
French Music DVD (SNEP)	5
Italian Music DVD (FIMI)	11
UK Music Videos (Official Charts) DVD Collection (Live à Paris / On ne change pas)	19

=== Year-end charts ===
2005 year-end chart performance
Chart (2005)	Position
French Music DVD (SNEP)	25

2006 year-end chart performance
Chart (2006)	Position
French Music DVD (SNEP)	34

== Certifications ==
Certifications
Region	Certification	Certified units/sales
France (SNEP)	3× Platinum	60,000^{*}
^{*} Sales figures based on certification alone.

== Release history ==
Release history
Region	Date	Label	Format	Catalog
Switzerland	18 November 2005	Columbia	DVD	82876742559
France	21 November 2005	Columbia	DVD	82876742559
Canada	29 November 2005	Columbia	DVD	82876756799
United States	13 December 2005	Epic	DVD	82876758989
