= New France (disambiguation) =

New France (French: Nouvelle France; a.k.a. French North America) was a colonial possession of France in North America.

New France may also refer to:

== Historical ==
- Canada (New France), a former colony of France; the portion of New France frequently regarded as "New France"
- Kingdom of Araucanía and Patagonia, South America; also called "New France"
- Company of New France, a French colonial syndicate with a monopoly on the fur trade in New France

== Current locations ==
- New France, Antigonish, Nova Scotia, Canada; a village
- New France, Digby, Nova Scotia, Canada; a village
- New Ireland (island), South Pacific, Oceania; formerly named "New France"

== Other uses ==
- Tour of New France, a former pro-cycling race in Canada
- New France, a song by English electronic duo Orbital on their eighth studio album Wonky, released in 2012.

== See also ==
- France (disambiguation)
- Nouvelle France (disambiguation) (French: New France)
