= List of Billboard Adult Contemporary number ones of 1999 =

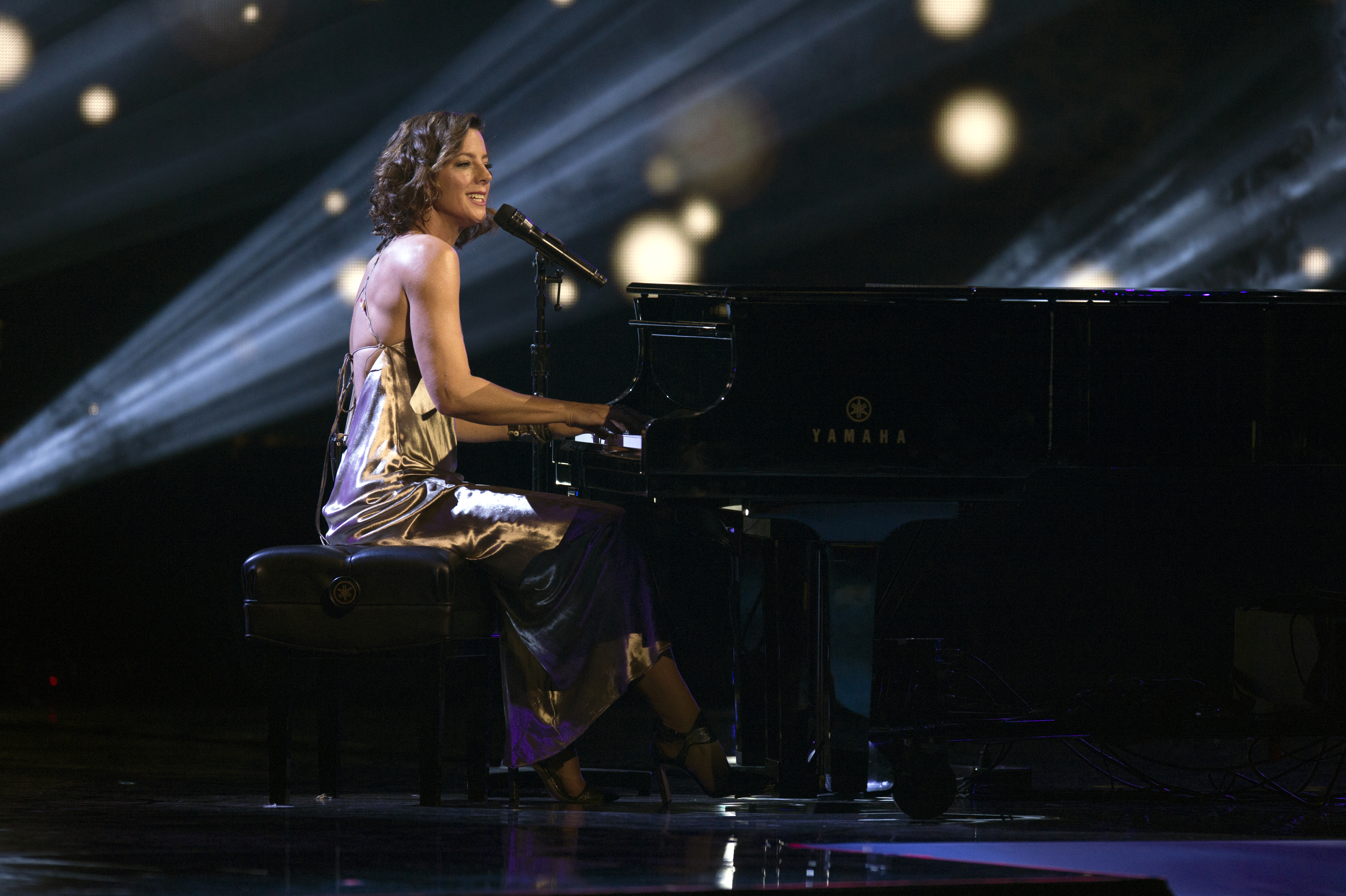
"Angel" by Sarah McLachlan (pictured in 2017) spent 12 weeks at number one.

Adult Contemporary is a chart published by Billboard ranking the top-performing songs in the United States in the adult contemporary music (AC) market. In 1999, six different songs topped the chart in fifty-two issues of the magazine, based on weekly airplay data from radio stations compiled by Nielsen Broadcast Data Systems.

In the first fifty weeks of the year, only four songs held the number one position on the AC chart. In the first issue of Billboard of 1999, "I'm Your Angel", a collaboration between R. Kelly and Celine Dion, was in its fourth week at number one. It held the top spot for the first nine weeks of the year to finish with a total of twelve consecutive weeks atop the chart. It was the only AC number one of the year to also top Billboard's all-genre listing, the Hot 100. In the issue dated March 6, the track was displaced from the top of the AC chart by "Angel" by the Canadian singer Sarah McLachlan, which also spent twelve consecutive weeks at number one. McLachlan's song was replaced at number one in the issue dated May 29 by "You'll Be in My Heart" by the British singer Phil Collins. Taken from the soundtrack of the Disney film Tarzan, for which Collins wrote several songs, the track spent nineteen non-consecutive weeks at number one, tying the record for the highest number of weeks atop the AC chart by a song, set three years earlier by Celine Dion's "Because You Loved Me". Collins also won both the Golden Globe Award for Best Original Song and the Academy Award for Best Song for "You'll Be in My Heart". The nineteen weeks which the song spent atop the AC chart consisted of four separate runs, all of which were ended by "I Want It That Way" by the Backstreet Boys, which ultimately spent a total of ten weeks at number one.

In the penultimate issue of Billboard of the year, Celine Dion returned to number one with "That's the Way It Is", making her the only artist to achieve two number ones in 1999. At the time, the song was not available to the public to purchase as a physical single, but it was released to radio stations and achieved sufficient plays to top the AC chart, which is based solely on airplay. "That's the Way It Is" was Dion's final number one before she took a hiatus from the music business, during which she gave birth to her first child. A week later, "I Knew I Loved You" by Savage Garden moved into the number one position, the start of a run in the top spot which would ultimately last for seventeen weeks. The track became one of the most enduring songs in the history of AC radio, and in 2002, it set a new record for the highest total number of weeks spent on Billboard's Adult Contemporary chart, when it spent its 124th week on the listing, breaking the record set by one of Savage Garden's earlier songs, "Truly Madly Deeply".

== Chart history ==
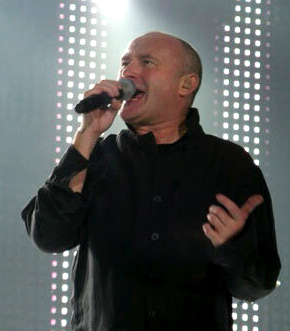
Phil Collins spent a record-tying nineteen weeks at number one with "You'll Be in My Heart".

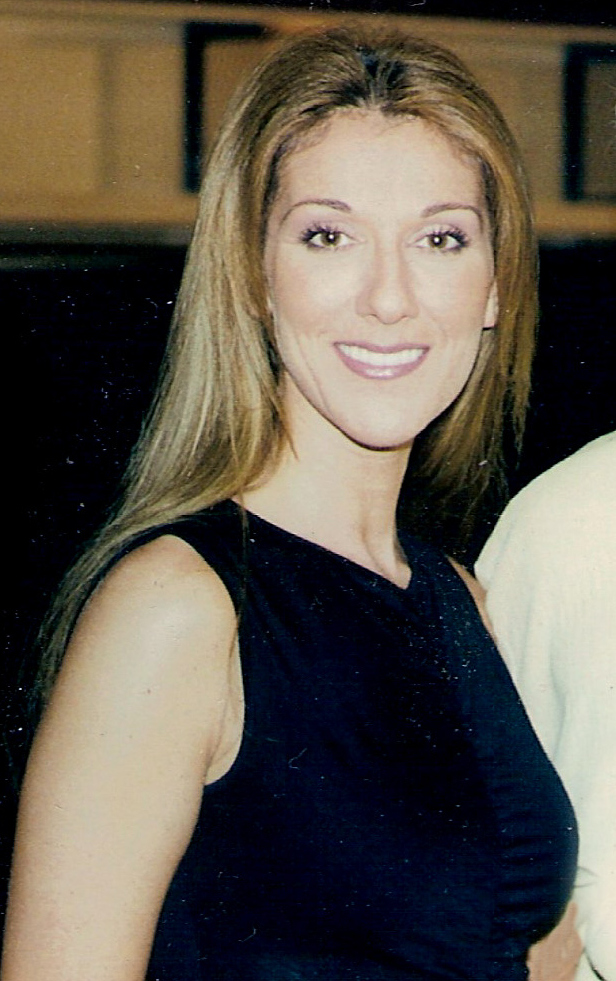
Celine Dion was the only artist to achieve more than one number one in 1999.

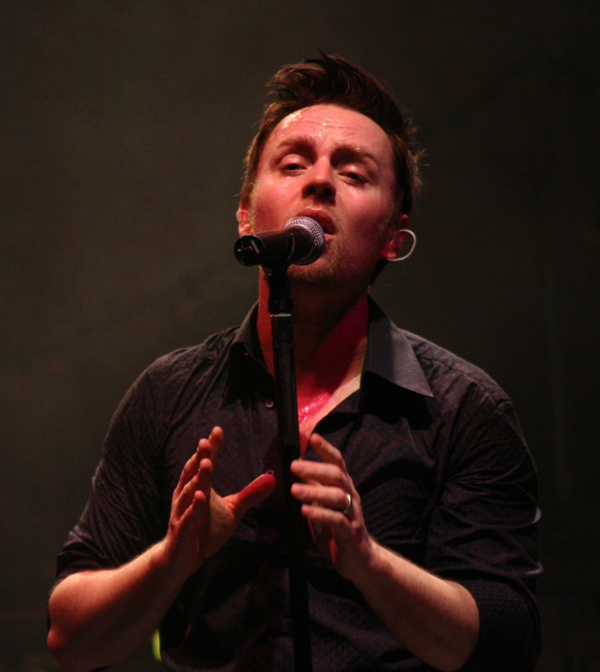
The Australian pop duo Savage Garden (vocalist Darren Hayes pictured) ended the year at number one with their song “I Knew I Loved You”.

Chart history
Issue date	Title	Artist(s)	Ref.
January 2	"I'm Your Angel"	R. Kelly & Celine Dion	
January 9	"I'm Your Angel"	R. Kelly & Celine Dion	
January 16	"I'm Your Angel"	R. Kelly & Celine Dion	
January 23	"I'm Your Angel"	R. Kelly & Celine Dion	
January 30	"I'm Your Angel"	R. Kelly & Celine Dion	
February 6	"I'm Your Angel"	R. Kelly & Celine Dion	
February 13	"I'm Your Angel"	R. Kelly & Celine Dion	
February 20	"I'm Your Angel"	R. Kelly & Celine Dion	
February 27	"I'm Your Angel"	R. Kelly & Celine Dion	
March 6	"Angel"	Sarah McLachlan	
March 13	"Angel"	Sarah McLachlan	
March 20	"Angel"	Sarah McLachlan	
March 27	"Angel"	Sarah McLachlan	
April 3	"Angel"	Sarah McLachlan	
April 10	"Angel"	Sarah McLachlan	
April 17	"Angel"	Sarah McLachlan	
April 24	"Angel"	Sarah McLachlan	
May 1	"Angel"	Sarah McLachlan	
May 8	"Angel"	Sarah McLachlan	
May 15	"Angel"	Sarah McLachlan	
May 22	"Angel"	Sarah McLachlan	
May 29	"You'll Be in My Heart"	Phil Collins	
June 5	"You'll Be in My Heart"	Phil Collins	
June 12	"You'll Be in My Heart"	Phil Collins	
June 19	"You'll Be in My Heart"	Phil Collins	
June 26	"You'll Be in My Heart"	Phil Collins	
July 3	"You'll Be in My Heart"	Phil Collins	
July 10	"You'll Be in My Heart"	Phil Collins	
July 17	"You'll Be in My Heart"	Phil Collins	
July 24	"You'll Be in My Heart"	Phil Collins	
July 31	"I Want It That Way"	Backstreet Boys	
August 7	"You'll Be in My Heart"	Phil Collins	
August 14	"You'll Be in My Heart"	Phil Collins	
August 21	"You'll Be in My Heart"	Phil Collins	
August 28	"I Want It That Way"	Backstreet Boys	
September 4	"You'll Be in My Heart"	Phil Collins	
September 11	"You'll Be in My Heart"	Phil Collins	
September 18	"You'll Be in My Heart"	Phil Collins	
September 25	"You'll Be in My Heart"	Phil Collins	
October 2	"I Want It That Way"	Backstreet Boys	
October 9	"I Want It That Way"	Backstreet Boys	
October 16	"You'll Be in My Heart"	Phil Collins	
October 23	"You'll Be in My Heart"	Phil Collins	
October 30	"You'll Be in My Heart"	Phil Collins	
November 6	"I Want It That Way"	Backstreet Boys	
November 13	"I Want It That Way"	Backstreet Boys	
November 20	"I Want It That Way"	Backstreet Boys	
November 27	"I Want It That Way"	Backstreet Boys	
December 4	"I Want It That Way"	Backstreet Boys	
December 11	"I Want It That Way"	Backstreet Boys	
December 18	"That's the Way It Is"	Celine Dion	
December 25	"I Knew I Loved You"	Savage Garden	

== See also ==
- 1999 in music
- List of artists who reached number one on the U.S. Adult Contemporary chart
