= List of Billboard Adult Contemporary number ones of 1998 =

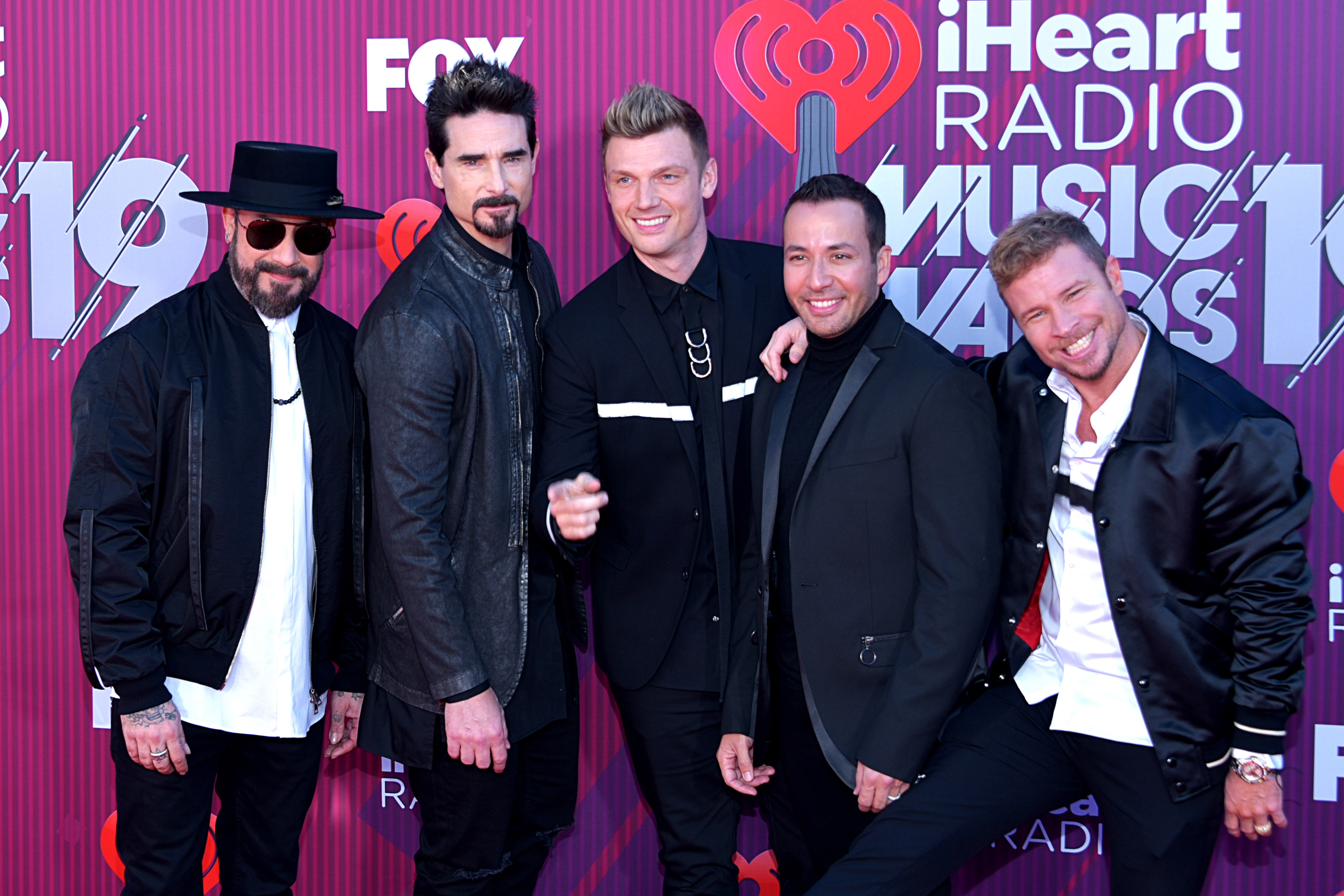
"I'll Never Break Your Heart" was a chart-topper for Backstreet Boys.

Adult Contemporary is a chart published by Billboard ranking the top-performing songs in the United States in the adult contemporary music (AC) market. In 1998, eight different songs topped the chart in 52 issues of the magazine, based on weekly airplay data from radio stations compiled by Nielsen Broadcast Data Systems.

In the year's first issue of Billboard, the number one song was "Something About the Way You Look Tonight" by the British singer Elton John, which was in its seventh week at number one. The song went on to extend its unbroken run in the top spot to ten weeks before it was displaced by "My Heart Will Go On" by the Canadian vocalist Celine Dion in the issue dated January 31. Dion's song, taken from the soundtrack of the film Titanic, also spent ten weeks at number one; it dominated radio airplay across a number of formats, even acquiring enough plays on Latin music stations to become the first non-Spanish language song to top the Hot Latin Tracks chart. It also won a range of awards, including the Academy Award for Best Original Song and the Golden Globe Award for Best Original Song as well as the Grammy Awards for Record of the Year, Song of the Year, Best Female Pop Vocal Performance and Best Song Written Specifically for a Motion Picture or Television. Dion returned to the top spot later in the year with both "To Love You More" and "I'm Your Angel", the latter a duet with the American artist R. Kelly. Her total of 21 weeks spent at number one during 1998 was the most by any artist.

The only artist other than Dion to achieve more than one AC number one in 1998 was her fellow Canadian vocalist Shania Twain, who spent eight non-consecutive weeks in the top spot with "You're Still the One" and one week with "From This Moment On". The former also topped Billboard's Hot Country Singles & Tracks chart, on which Twain had experienced considerable success since 1995; it was her first entry on the AC listing, as her music began to be marketed toward pop audiences for the first time. Her second number one of the year, "From This Moment On", had originally been recorded as a duet with the country singer Bryan White, but his vocals were removed from the version released as a single, in order to make it more appealing to pop music radio. The longest unbroken run at number one on the AC chart during the year was 11 weeks, achieved by the Australian duo Savage Garden with the song "Truly Madly Deeply". The track went on to be one of the most enduring songs in the history of AC radio, and set a new record for the highest total number of weeks spent on Billboard's Adult Contemporary chart with a total of 123 weeks on the listing, a mark that stood until February 2002 when Savage Garden broke its own record with "I Knew I Loved You".

== Chart history ==
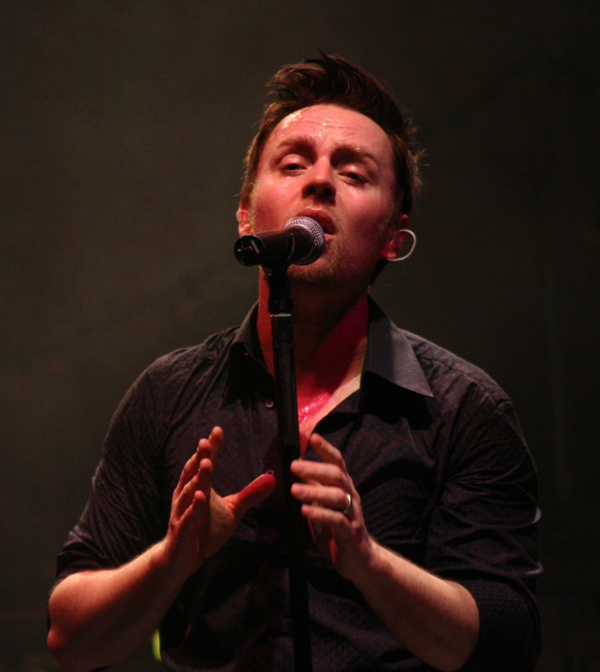
Savage Garden (vocalist Darren Hayes pictured) had the longest run of the year at number one with the song “Truly Madly Deeply”.

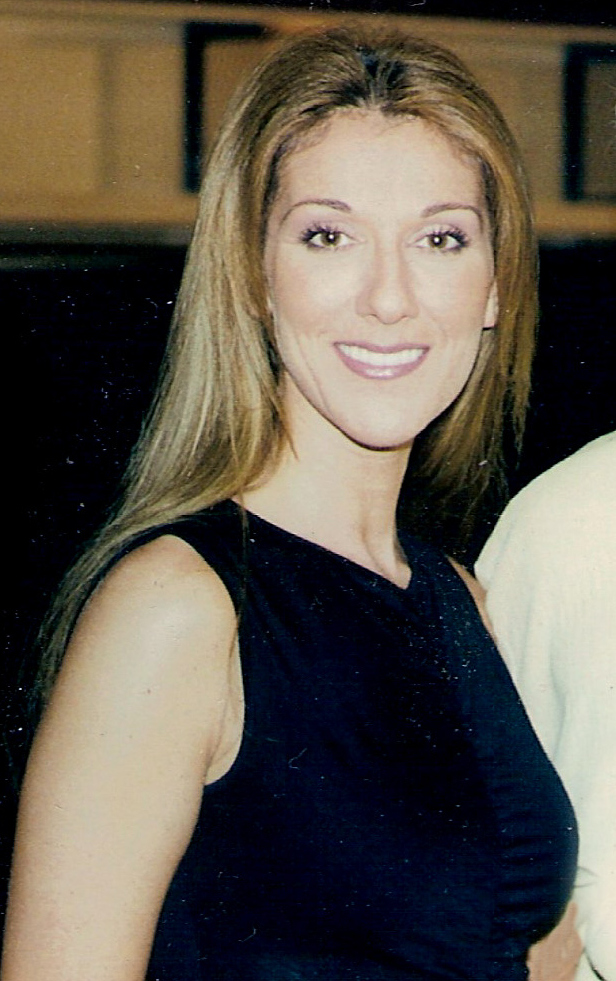
Celine Dion spent 21 weeks at number one, the most by any artist.

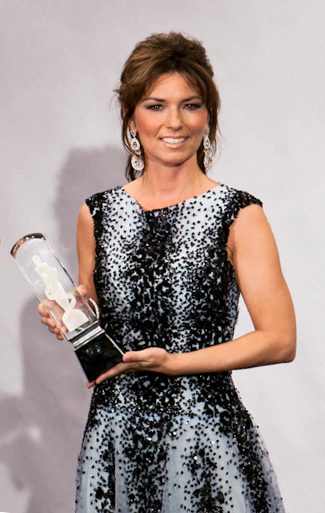
Shania Twain had two number ones during the year.

Chart history
Issue date	Title	Artist(s)	Ref.
January 3	"Something About the Way You Look Tonight"	Elton John	
January 10	"Something About the Way You Look Tonight"	Elton John	
January 17	"Something About the Way You Look Tonight"	Elton John	
January 24	"Something About the Way You Look Tonight"	Elton John	
January 31	"My Heart Will Go On"	Celine Dion	
February 7	"My Heart Will Go On"	Celine Dion	
February 14	"My Heart Will Go On"	Celine Dion	
February 21	"My Heart Will Go On"	Celine Dion	
February 28	"My Heart Will Go On"	Celine Dion	
March 7	"My Heart Will Go On"	Celine Dion	
March 14	"My Heart Will Go On"	Celine Dion	
March 21	"My Heart Will Go On"	Celine Dion	
March 28	"My Heart Will Go On"	Celine Dion	
April 4	"My Heart Will Go On"	Celine Dion	
April 11	"Truly Madly Deeply"	Savage Garden	
April 18	"Truly Madly Deeply"	Savage Garden	
April 25	"Truly Madly Deeply"	Savage Garden	
May 2	"Truly Madly Deeply"	Savage Garden	
May 9	"Truly Madly Deeply"	Savage Garden	
May 16	"Truly Madly Deeply"	Savage Garden	
May 23	"Truly Madly Deeply"	Savage Garden	
May 30	"Truly Madly Deeply"	Savage Garden	
June 6	"Truly Madly Deeply"	Savage Garden	
June 13	"Truly Madly Deeply"	Savage Garden	
June 20	"Truly Madly Deeply"	Savage Garden	
June 27	"You're Still the One"	Shania Twain	
July 4	"You're Still the One"	Shania Twain	
July 11	"You're Still the One"	Shania Twain	
July 18	"You're Still the One"	Shania Twain	
July 25	"You're Still the One"	Shania Twain	
August 1	"You're Still the One"	Shania Twain	
August 8	"To Love You More"	Celine Dion	
August 15	"You're Still the One"	Shania Twain	
August 22	"To Love You More"	Celine Dion	
August 29	"You're Still the One"	Shania Twain	
September 5	"To Love You More"	Celine Dion	
September 12	"To Love You More"	Celine Dion	
September 19	"To Love You More"	Celine Dion	
September 26	"To Love You More"	Celine Dion	
October 3	"To Love You More"	Celine Dion	
October 10	"To Love You More"	Celine Dion	
October 17	"I'll Never Break Your Heart"	Backstreet Boys	
October 24	"I'll Never Break Your Heart"	Backstreet Boys	
October 31	"I'll Never Break Your Heart"	Backstreet Boys	
November 7	"I'll Never Break Your Heart"	Backstreet Boys	
November 14	"I'll Never Break Your Heart"	Backstreet Boys	
November 21	"I'll Never Break Your Heart"	Backstreet Boys	
November 28	"I'll Never Break Your Heart"	Backstreet Boys	
December 5	"From This Moment On"	Shania Twain	
December 12	"I'm Your Angel"	R. Kelly & Celine Dion	
December 19	"I'm Your Angel"	R. Kelly & Celine Dion	
December 26	"I'm Your Angel"	R. Kelly & Celine Dion	

== See also ==
- 1998 in music
- List of artists who reached number one on the U.S. Adult Contemporary chart
