= Dans un autre monde =

Song by Celine Dion

from the album S'il suffisait d'aimer
- Language: French
- Released: 31 August 1998
- Studio: Méga (Paris)
- Genre: Pop
- Length: 4:38
- Label: Columbia
- Songwriter: Jean-Jacques Goldman
- Producers: Jean-Jacques Goldman; Erick Benzi

Music video
- "Dans un autre monde" on YouTube

"Dans un autre monde" (lit. 'In another world') is a song by Canadian singer Celine Dion from her sixteenth studio album, S'il suffisait d'aimer (1998). Written by Jean-Jacques Goldman and produced by Goldman and Erick Benzi, it later appeared in a live performance video released in August 1999 to promote Au cœur du stade.

== Background and release ==
After D'eux became the best-selling French-language album of all time, Dion reunited with Jean-Jacques Goldman to record a follow-up project. S'il suffisait d'aimer was recorded between September 1997 and July 1998 and produced by Goldman and Erick Benzi. The album includes "Dans un autre monde", one of several songs written by Goldman for the project. In late August 1999, a live video of Dion performing the track was issued to promote Au cœur du stade and the accompanying home video release. Dion performed the song regularly in concerts between 1999 and 2020, and it was later included on her 2005 greatest hits album On ne change pas.

== Commercial performance ==
Although not released as a single, "Dans un autre monde" debuted on the ADISQ Radio chart in Quebec on 30 January 1999, peaking at number 49. In Belgium's Wallonia, the song entered the Ultratop Airplay chart following the release of Au cœur du stade. It reached number seven on 26 October 1999 and remained inside the top 50 for seven weeks. In October 2019, "Dans un autre monde" entered the French Sales chart at number 117 due to digital downloads, and re-entered in April 2020, peaking at number 102.

== Music video ==
The live music video was filmed at the Stade de France in Paris during two sold-out shows of the Let's Talk About Love World Tour on 19 and 20 June 1999. Directed by Gérard Pullicino, it was released in late August 1999 to promote the Au cœur du stade CD and the DVD of the same name. Across the two concerts, Dion performed for more than 180,000 spectators, becoming the first artist to play to over 90,000 attendees per night at the venue.

== Charts ==
1999 chart performance
Chart (1999)	Peak position
Belgium (Ultratop Airplay Wallonia)	7
Quebec Radio Songs (ADISQ)	49

2019–2020 chart performance
Chart (2019–2020)	Peak position
France Song Sales (SNEP)	102
