= En attendant ses pas =

Promotional single by Celine Dion

from the album S'il suffisait d'aimer
- Language: French
- Released: June 1999
- Studio: Méga (Paris)
- Genre: Pop
- Length: 4:07
- Label: Columbia
- Songwriter: Jean-Jacques Goldman
- Producers: Jean-Jacques Goldman; Erick Benzi

Audio
- "En attendant ses pas" on YouTube

"En attendant ses pas" (lit. 'Waiting for his footsteps') is a song by Canadian singer Celine Dion from her sixteenth studio album, S'il suffisait d'aimer (1998). Written by Jean-Jacques Goldman and produced by Goldman and Erick Benzi, it was released as a promotional single in June 1999. The song topped the chart in Quebec for four weeks and reached the top 10 on the airplay charts in France and Wallonia (Belgium).

== Background and release ==
After D'eux became the best-selling French-language album of all time, Dion reunited with Jean-Jacques Goldman to record a follow-up. S'il suffisait d'aimer was recorded between September 1997 and July 1998, with production by Goldman and Erick Benzi. "En attendant ses pas" was selected as the album's fourth single and issued for promotional use only. It was released in June 1999 in France, followed by Quebec and Wallonia (Belgium). In 2005, the song was included on Dion's greatest hits album On ne change pas.

== Commercial performance ==
In France, "En attendant ses pas" entered the airplay chart on 19 June 1999 and peaked at number six on 31 July 1999. It spent three weeks at number six and nine weeks inside the top 10. The song left the airplay top 25 on 11 September 1999 after 11 weeks on the chart.

In Quebec, the song entered the chart on 10 July 1999. It reached number one for four weeks between 18 September and 9 October 1999 and spent 35 weeks on the chart in total.

In Belgium's Wallonia, "En attendant ses pas" peaked at number 10 on 28 September 1999 and spent three weeks inside the top 50 of the airplay chart.

== Charts ==
Chart performance
Chart (1999)	Peak position
Belgium (Ultratop Airplay Wallonia)	10
France Airplay (SNEP)	6
Quebec Radio Songs (ADISQ)	1
