= Treat Her Like a Lady (Diana King song) =

1995 song by Diana King

"Treat Her Like a Lady" is a song by Jamaican-American singer Diana King from her 1995 album, Tougher Than Love. It was written by King, Andy Marvel, and Billy Mann, and produced by Marvel. In 1997, Canadian singer Celine Dion recorded a cover for her fifth English-language album, Let's Talk About Love.

== Celine Dion version ==
"Treat Her Like a Lady"

Single by Celine Dion

from the album Let's Talk About Love
- B-side: "To Love You More" (Tony Moran pop edit mix)
- Released: 22 March 1999
- Recorded: 1997
- Studio: Cove City Sound; Dream Factory; Hit Factory
- Genre: Reggae; dancehall
- Length: 4:05
- Label: Columbia; Epic
- Songwriters: Diana King; Andy Marvel; Billy Mann; Celine Dion
- Producer: Ric Wake

Celine Dion singles chronology
"On ne change pas" (1999)	"Treat Her Like a Lady" (1999)	"That's the Way It Is" (1999)

Music video
- "Treat Her Like a Lady" on YouTube

Celine Dion recorded "Treat Her Like a Lady" for her 1997 album, Let's Talk About Love. The track was produced by Ric Wake. Dion altered parts of the lyrics, which resulted in a co-writing credit. Guest vocals were recorded by Diana King and Brownstone. The song was issued as the album's final single in Europe between March and June 1999, coinciding with the Let's Talk About Love World Tour. It reached the top 40 in the United Kingdom, Scotland, Ireland, Austria, and Iceland.

=== Critical reception ===
Entertainment Weekly editor David Browne described Dion's version as an "overarranged stab at reggae dancehall" and "unintentionally amusing". Jonathan Bernstein of The New York Observer wrote that Dion "has never humiliated herself as comprehensively as she does when mashing it up in a dance-hall style on 'Treat Her Like a Lady'". Steven Wells of NME commented that Dion "raps hardcore radical feminism", adding that the song's message about treating women with respect is delivered with unexpected intensity.

=== Commercial performance ===
After the success of "My Heart Will Go On", radio stations in Quebec began playing "Treat Her Like a Lady" in May 1998. It entered the airplay chart on 30 May 1998 and peaked at number nine. The commercial single was released in selected European markets between March and June 1999 to align with the European leg of the Let's Talk About Love World Tour.

In April 1999, the song entered the charts in Austria and Germany, peaking at numbers 16 and 64, respectively. In May 1999, it debuted in the Netherlands and Belgium, reaching number 62 in the Netherlands, number 70 in Wallonia, and number 78 in Flanders. In July 1999, it charted in additional countries, peaking at number 29 in the United Kingdom, number 33 in Scotland, number 40 in Ireland, number 54 in Sweden, and number 91 on the European Hot 100 Singles. It also reached number 13 in Iceland and number 38 on the Spanish airplay chart.

=== Music video ===
The live music video was recorded on 18 December 1998 during the Let's Talk About Love World Tour in Montreal, Canada. It was directed by Gérard Pullicino. The video was included on the UK enhanced CD single in June 1999. In November 2022, it was uploaded to Dion's official YouTube channel.

=== Formats and track listing ===
- European CD single
1. "Treat Her Like a Lady" – 4:05
2. "To Love You More" (Tony Moran pop edit mix) – 4:53
- European CD maxi-single
1. "Treat Her Like a Lady" – 4:05
2. "To Love You More" (Tony Moran pop edit mix) – 4:53
3. "Unison" (single dance mix) – 4:03
- UK cassette single
1. "Treat Her Like a Lady" – 4:05
2. "Treat Her Like a Lady" (Ric Wake radio mix) – 3:34
3. "The Prayer" (duet with Andrea Bocelli) – 4:30
- UK CD single
1. "Treat Her Like a Lady" – 4:05
2. "Treat Her Like a Lady" (the Metro club mix) – 7:06
3. "Treat Her Like a Lady" (Ric Wake club mix) – 8:17
- UK enhanced CD single
1. "Treat Her Like a Lady" (live) – 4:19^{[a]}
2. "Love Can Move Mountains" (live) – 4:53^{[b]}
3. "The Prayer" (duet with Andrea Bocelli) – 4:30
4. "Treat Her Like a Lady" (video) – 4:19

==== Notes ====
- ^{^a} recorded live at Molson Centre in Montreal on 18 December 1998
- ^{^b} recorded live at L'Olympia in Paris in September 1994

=== Charts ===
Chart performance
Chart (1998–1999)	Peak position
Austria (Ö3 Austria Top 40)	16
Belgium (Ultratop 50 Flanders)	78
Belgium (Ultratop 50 Wallonia)	70
Europe (European Hot 100 Singles)	91
Finland (Suomen virallinen radiosoittolista)	16
Germany (GfK)	64
Iceland (Íslenski Listinn Topp 40)	13
Ireland (IRMA)	40
Netherlands (Dutch Top 40 Tipparade)	12
Netherlands (Single Top 100)	62
Quebec Radio Songs (ADISQ)	9
Scotland Singles (Official Charts)	33
Spain (Top 40 Radio)	38
Sweden (Sverigetopplistan)	54
UK Singles (OCC)	29

=== Release history ===
Release history
Region	Date	Format	Label	Ref.
Germany	22 March 1999	CD	Columbia	
Belgium	10 May 1999	CD	Columbia	
United Kingdom	28 June 1999	Cassette; CD	Epic	
