= S'il suffisait d'aimer =

Studio album by Celine Dion
- Released: 31 August 1998
- Recorded: September 1997–July 1998
- Studio: Méga (Paris)
- Genre: Pop
- Length: 51:32
- Language: French
- Labels: Columbia; Epic
- Producers: Jean-Jacques Goldman; Erick Benzi

Celine Dion chronology
Let's Talk About Love (1997)	S'il suffisait d'aimer (1998)	These Are Special Times (1998)

Singles from S'il suffisait d'aimer
- 1. "Zora sourit" Released: 7 September 1998; 2. "S'il suffisait d'aimer" Released: 23 November 1998; 3. "On ne change pas" Released: 1 March 1999

S'il suffisait d'aimer (lit. 'If only love could be enough') is the sixteenth studio album by Canadian singer Celine Dion and her eleventh French-language release. Issued by Columbia Records and Epic Records on 31 August 1998, the album was written primarily by French singer-songwriter Jean-Jacques Goldman and produced by Goldman with Erick Benzi.

The album achieved substantial commercial success, particularly in Francophone countries, and became the second best-selling French-language album of all time, surpassed only by Dion's D'eux (1995). It produced several commercially successful singles, including "Zora sourit", "S'il suffisait d'aimer", and "On ne change pas". Critics noted its emotional tone, melodic focus, and Dion's vocal delivery. The album also earned the Juno Award for Best Selling Francophone Album of the Year.

== Content and promotion ==
S'il suffisait d'aimer marked Dion's second major collaboration with Jean-Jacques Goldman, following the commercial success of D'eux. While their earlier project was written with Dion's established vocal style in mind, this album adopts a more restrained and intimate approach. The arrangements are relatively minimal, placing greater focus on Dion's voice and the material's emotional tone.

During the Francophone leg of the Let's Talk About Love World Tour, Dion performed six songs from the album. Her concerts in Paris were recorded and released as Au cœur du stade (1999). Promotion also included the live performance video for "Dans un autre monde" and behind-the-scenes material from the album's recording sessions, later issued as bonus content on the Au cœur du stade DVD.

Several tracks from S'il suffisait d'aimer were later included on Dion's 2005 greatest hits compilation On ne change pas.

== Critical reception ==
Professional ratings
Review scores
Source	Rating
AllMusic	3/5 stars
Public	20/20

The album received generally positive reviews from critics, who noted its emotional tone, polished production, and Dion's vocal delivery. AllMusic described the record as a confident return "to her roots", highlighting its stylistic cohesion and its connection to both her French‑language catalogue and her broader international work.

The French magazine Public awarded the album a perfect score, calling it "a more intimate, subtle and emotionally resonant counterpart to D'eux". The review pointed to the album's reflective lyrical themes, its restrained arrangements, and the strength of tracks such as "On ne change pas", "En attendant ses pas", and "Zora sourit". It also singled out "Papillon" as a rediscovered highlight, re-recorded by Dion for what the magazine described as its "sheer emotional beauty".

== Commercial performance ==
S'il suffisait d'aimer is the second best-selling French-language album in history, behind D'eux. Within its first three weeks (excluding the United States), it sold two million copies worldwide, including 700,000 in France. The album maintained strong sales throughout 1998 and 1999, ultimately surpassing four million copies worldwide. Of these, two million were sold in Europe, where the album was certified double platinum by the IFPI.

In France, S'il suffisait d'aimer became one of the country's best-selling albums of the decade, with over 1.89 million copies sold and a diamond certification. In Canada, the album sold 500,000 copies and was certified four times platinum by the CRIA. It also earned gold, platinum, and multi-platinum certifications in several non-Francophone markets. It became only the second French-language album—after D'eux—to be certified gold in the United Kingdom.

In the United States, the album sold 112,000 copies according to Nielsen SoundScan.

The album topped the charts in Switzerland (five weeks), France (four weeks), Belgium's Wallonia (four weeks), Quebec (two weeks), and also reached number one in Canada, Greece, Poland, and on the European Top 100 Albums. It also charted well in non-Francophone countries, peaking at number 11 in Germany and number 17 in the United Kingdom, reflecting its broad international reach.

== Accolades ==
S'il suffisait d'aimer won the Juno Award for Best Selling Francophone Album of the Year. It was also nominated at the Victoires de la Musique for Pop/Rock Album of the Year, and Dion received a nomination for Female Artist of the Year.

== Track listing ==
All tracks are written by Jean-Jacques Goldman, except where noted. All tracks are produced by Goldman and Erick Benzi.

No.	Title	Writer(s)	Length
1.	"Je crois toi"		5:05
2.	"Zora sourit"	Goldman; J. Kapler	3:51
3.	"On ne change pas"		4:08
4.	"Je chanterai"		4:10
5.	"Terre"	Benzi	4:17
6.	"En attendant ses pas"		4:07
7.	"Papillon"	Benzi	4:01
8.	"L'abandon"		4:27
9.	"Dans un autre monde"		4:38
10.	"Sur le même bateau"		4:25
11.	"Tous les blues sont écrits pour toi"		4:48
12.	"S'il suffisait d'aimer"		3:35
Total length:			51:32

== Charts ==
=== Weekly charts ===
Weekly chart performance
Chart (1998–1999)	Peak position
Austrian Albums (Ö3 Austria)	3
Belgian Albums (Ultratop Flanders)	2
Belgian Albums (Ultratop Wallonia)	1
Canada Top Albums/CDs (RPM)	1
Canadian Albums (Billboard)	1
Czech Albums (ČNS IFPI)	17
Danish Albums (Hitlisten)	30
Dutch Albums (Album Top 100)	4
European Albums (Music & Media)	1
Finnish Albums (Suomen virallinen lista)	12
French Albums (SNEP)	1
German Albums (Offizielle Top 100)	11
Greek Foreign Albums (IFPI)	1
Hungarian Albums (MAHASZ)	15
Italian Albums (FIMI)	33
Japanese Albums (Oricon)	37
Polish Albums (Music Corner)	1
Portuguese Albums (AFP)	15
Quebec (ADISQ)	1
Scottish Albums (Official Charts)	31
Slovak Albums (IFPI)	28
South Korean Albums (IFPI)	23
Swedish Albums (Sverigetopplistan)	23
Swiss Albums (Schweizer Hitparade)	1
Taiwanese Albums (IFPI)	7
UK Albums (Official Charts)	17

=== Year-end charts ===
1998 year-end chart performance
Chart (1998)	Position
Austrian Albums (Ö3 Austria)	30
Belgian Albums (Ultratop Flanders)	36
Belgian Albums (Ultratop Wallonia)	6
Canada Top Albums/CDs (RPM)	82
Canadian Albums (SoundScan)	76
Dutch Albums (MegaCharts)	79
European Albums (Music & Media)	35
French Albums (SNEP)	4
German Albums (Offizielle Top 100)	96
Swiss Albums (Schweizer Hitparade)	13

1999 year-end chart performance
Chart (1999)	Position
Belgian Albums (Ultratop Wallonia)	12
Belgian Francophone Albums (Ultratop Wallonia)	9
European Albums (Music & Media)	69
French Albums (SNEP)	8

2000 year-end chart performance
Chart (2000)	Position
Finnish Foreign Albums (Suomen virallinen lista)	119

=== All-time charts ===
All-time chart performance
Chart	Position
Canadian Artists Albums (SoundScan)	150

== Certifications and sales ==
Certifications
Region	Certification	Certified units/sales
Austria (IFPI Austria)	Gold	25,000^{*}
Belgium (BRMA)	2× Platinum	100,000^{*}
Canada (Music Canada)	4× Platinum	500,000
Finland	—	18,344
France (SNEP)	Diamond	1,000,000^{*}
Germany	—	120,000
Japan	—	41,000
Netherlands (NVPI)	Gold	50,000^{^}
Poland (ZPAV)	Gold	50,000^{*}
Switzerland (IFPI Switzerland)	2× Platinum	100,000^{^}
United Kingdom (BPI)	Gold	100,000^{^}
United States	—	112,000
Summaries
Europe (IFPI)	2× Platinum	2,000,000^{*}
Worldwide	—	4,000,000
^{*} Sales figures based on certification alone.^{^} Shipments figures based on certification alone.

== Release history ==
Release history
Region	Date	Label	Format	Catalog
Belgium; France; Switzerland	31 August 1998	Columbia	CD; cassette	4918592; 4918594
United Kingdom	7 September 1998	Epic	CD; cassette	4918592; 4918594
Canada	8 September 1998	Columbia	CD; cassette	CK 80339; CT 80339
United States	13 October 1998	Epic	CD; cassette	BK 69679; BT 69679
Japan	21 January 1999	SMEJ	CD	ESCA-7425
Various	1 September 2017	Sony Music	LP	88985450201

== See also ==
- Juno Award for Francophone Album of the Year
- List of best-selling albums in France
- List of European number-one hits of 1998
- List of number-one albums of 1998 (Canada)
- List of number-one singles of 1998 (France)
