= List of European number-one hits of 1998 =

This is a list of the European Music & Media magazine's European Hot 100 Singles and European Top 100 Albums number-ones of 1998.

== Chart history ==
Date	Song	Artist	Album	Artist
January 3	"Barbie Girl"	Aqua	Let's Talk About Love	Celine Dion
January 10	"Barbie Girl"	Aqua	Let's Talk About Love	Celine Dion
January 17	"Barbie Girl"	Aqua	Let's Talk About Love	Celine Dion
January 24	"Barbie Girl"	Aqua	Let's Talk About Love	Celine Dion
January 31	"Together Again"	Janet Jackson	Let's Talk About Love	Celine Dion
February 7	"Together Again"	Janet Jackson	Let's Talk About Love	Celine Dion
February 14	"Together Again"	Janet Jackson	Titanic: Music from the Motion Picture	James Horner
February 21	"My Heart Will Go On"	Celine Dion	Titanic: Music from the Motion Picture	James Horner
February 28	"My Heart Will Go On"	Celine Dion	Titanic: Music from the Motion Picture	James Horner
March 7	"My Heart Will Go On"	Celine Dion	Titanic: Music from the Motion Picture	James Horner
March 14	"My Heart Will Go On"	Celine Dion	Titanic: Music from the Motion Picture	James Horner
March 21	"My Heart Will Go On"	Celine Dion	Titanic: Music from the Motion Picture	James Horner
March 28	"My Heart Will Go On"	Celine Dion	Ray of Light	Madonna
April 4	"My Heart Will Go On"	Celine Dion	Ray of Light	Madonna
April 11	"My Heart Will Go On"	Celine Dion	Titanic: Music from the Motion Picture	James Horner
April 18	"My Heart Will Go On"	Celine Dion	Titanic: Music from the Motion Picture	James Horner
April 25	"My Heart Will Go On"	Celine Dion	Titanic: Music from the Motion Picture	James Horner
May 2	"My Heart Will Go On"	Celine Dion	Titanic: Music from the Motion Picture	James Horner
May 9	"My Heart Will Go On"	Celine Dion	Titanic: Music from the Motion Picture	James Horner
May 16	"My Heart Will Go On"	Celine Dion	Titanic: Music from the Motion Picture	James Horner
May 23	"My Heart Will Go On"	Celine Dion	Mezzanine	Massive Attack
May 30	"My Heart Will Go On"	Celine Dion	Version 2.0	Garbage
June 6	"My Heart Will Go On"	Celine Dion	Blue	Simply Red
June 13	"My Heart Will Go On"	Celine Dion	Blue	Simply Red
June 20	"La Copa de la Vida/The Cup of Life"	Ricky Martin	Adore	The Smashing Pumpkins
June 27	"La Copa de la Vida/The Cup of Life"	Ricky Martin	Adore	The Smashing Pumpkins
July 4	"La Copa de la Vida/The Cup of Life"	Ricky Martin	Blue	Simply Red
July 11	"La Copa de la Vida/The Cup of Life"	Ricky Martin	Adore	The Smashing Pumpkins
July 18	"La Copa de la Vida/The Cup of Life"	Ricky Martin	Back for Good	Modern Talking
July 25	"Ghetto Supastar (That Is What You Are)"	Pras Michel featuring Ol' Dirty Bastard & Mýa	Hello Nasty	Beastie Boys
August 1	"Ghetto Supastar (That Is What You Are)"	Pras Michel featuring Ol' Dirty Bastard & Mýa	Hello Nasty	Beastie Boys
August 8	"Ghetto Supastar (That Is What You Are)"	Pras Michel featuring Ol' Dirty Bastard & Mýa	Hello Nasty	Beastie Boys
August 15	"Ghetto Supastar (That Is What You Are)"	Pras Michel featuring Ol' Dirty Bastard & Mýa	Hello Nasty	Beastie Boys
August 22	"Ghetto Supastar (That Is What You Are)"	Pras Michel featuring Ol' Dirty Bastard & Mýa	Hello Nasty	Beastie Boys
August 29	"Ghetto Supastar (That Is What You Are)"	Pras Michel featuring Ol' Dirty Bastard & Mýa	Back for Good	Modern Talking
September 5	"Life"	Des'ree	Back for Good	Modern Talking
September 12	"Life"	Des'ree	Back for Good	Modern Talking
September 19	"Life"	Des'ree	Back for Good	Modern Talking
September 26	"I Don't Want to Miss a Thing"	Aerosmith	S'il suffisait d'aimer	Celine Dion
October 3	"I Don't Want to Miss a Thing"	Aerosmith	This Is My Truth Tell Me Yours	Manic Street Preachers
October 10	"I Don't Want to Miss a Thing"	Aerosmith	This Is My Truth Tell Me Yours	Manic Street Preachers
October 17	"I Don't Want to Miss a Thing"	Aerosmith	The Singles 86>98	Depeche Mode
October 24	"I Don't Want to Miss a Thing"	Aerosmith	Hits	Phil Collins
October 31	"I Don't Want to Miss a Thing"	Aerosmith	Hits	Phil Collins
November 7	"I Don't Want to Miss a Thing"	Aerosmith	Hits	Phil Collins
November 14	"I Don't Want to Miss a Thing"	Aerosmith	Up	R.E.M.
November 21	"Believe"	Cher	Supposed Former Infatuation Junkie	Alanis Morissette
November 28	"Believe"	Cher	The Best of 1980–1990	U2
December 5	"Believe"	Cher	The Best of 1980–1990	U2
December 12	"Believe"	Cher	The Best of 1980–1990	U2
December 19	"Believe"	Cher	The Best of 1980–1990	U2
December 26	"Believe"	Cher	The Best of 1980–1990	U2
