= Taro Hakase =

Japanese musician (born 1968)

- Born: January 23, 1968 (age 58); Suita, Osaka, Japan
- Genres: Classical music; electronic; instrumental
- Occupations: Composer; violinist; musician
- Instrument: Violin
- Years active: 1990–present
- Labels: Epic/Sony; HATS/Avex; SM Entertainment
- Formerly of: Kryzler & Kompany
- Spouse: Mayuko Takata (m. 1999)

Japanese name
- Kanji: 葉加瀬 太郎
- Hiragana: はかせ たろう
Transcriptions
- Romanization: Hakase Tarō

Taro Hakase (葉加瀬 太郎, Hakase Tarō; born January 23, 1968 in Suita, Osaka, Japan) is a Japanese musician who specialises as a violinist and composer.

== Biography ==
=== Career ===
Hakase was involved in a Japanese band called Kryzler & Kompany which formed while he was in college. He played the violin, while Tsuneyoshi Saito played keyboards, and Yoshinobu Takeshita played bass. Their first eponymous album was released in September 1990 and sold 74,000 copies. Their second, Kryzler And Company #, sold over 81,000 copies. Steve McClure of Billboard wrote that they have become "Japan's unlikeliest pop idols, attracting hordes of screaming fans, a far cry from the decorum and reserve usually shown by Japan's classical music audiences." The band provided the music for Celine Dion's single "To Love You More" which was recorded as the theme song for the Japanese drama Koibito Yo (My Dear Lover). The song reached number one on Billboard Japan. He then joined Dion on her nationwide promotional tour making television appearances and performed the song during her 1996–1997 Falling into You Tour and her 1998–1999 Let's Talk About Love Tour as guest violinist. When Dion went on hiatus to have her son, Hakase pursued a solo career, and Kryzler & Kompany disbanded after having produced 11 albums.

In 2006, to celebrate 10 years of his success, Hakase reunited with Dion in Las Vegas, Nevada during a performance of her show A New Day... to perform "To Love You More".

He performed "Addio monti (I promessi sposi)" on the 2007 Ennio Morricone tribute album We All Love Ennio Morricone, and also co-composed the album Symphonic Poem "Hope" with Yuji Toriyama, a collection of themes used in promotional videos for Final Fantasy XII.

In his native Japan, his song "Another Sky" is All Nippon Airways' theme song, while "Color Your Life" is Shinsei Bank's theme song.

On July 10, 2013, it was announced that he featured on D-Lite (Daesung) from BigBang's song "I Love You".

On May 20, 2014, he was featured on Namie Amuro's song "Can You Celebrate?", the song was rerecorded with a new vocals and new music video

On July 4, 2014, he was featured on a remix of American singer Ariana Grande's song "Baby I". It was included on the Japanese version of Grande's second album My Everything.

Kryzler & Kompany would later reunite. They released the album New World in February 2015 to commemorate their 25th anniversary.

=== Personal life ===
Hakase is married to Japanese actress Mayuko Takata and they live together in Tokyo, Japan.

== Discography ==
=== Albums ===
- Watashi (May 21, 1997)
- Canary (April 22, 1998, with Toshi)
- 髪結い伊三次 Original Sound Track (May 21, 1999)
- Duets (October 21, 1999)
- Tango Nostalgia (タンゴ・ノスタルジア) (August 30, 2000)
- Violinism (Acoustic Best) (September 1, 2000)
- Endless Violin (September 5, 2001)
- The Best Track (August 21, 2002)
- Violinism II (October 2, 2002)
- Traveling Notes (October 8, 2003)
- Migration (November 27, 2003)
- What a Day... (November 15, 2004)
- Der Wunder: 葉加瀬太郎 meets 松本零士 (November 25, 2004)
- Violinism with Love (October 5, 2005)
- The Best of Mozart Selected by Taro Hakase (May 3, 2006)
- Sweet Melodies: Taro Plays Hakase (September 6, 2006)
- Songs (July 4, 2007)
- Classical Tuning (September 10, 2008)
- The Best Track (September 2, 2009)
- My Favorite Songs (September 9, 2009)
- Emotionism (September 29, 2010)
- The Best of Taro Hakase (August 10, 2011)
- With One Wish (November 7, 2012)
- Japonism (August 21, 2013)
- Etupirka (Best Acoustic) (2014)

=== Singles ===
- "Ben" (May 21, 1997)
- "Natural High" (November 21, 1997, with Toshi)
- "Brazil" (November 21, 1997)
- "So Nice (Summer Samba)" (August 21, 1999)
- "交響詩「希望」Symphonic Poem 'Hope'" (March 1, 2006)

=== Collaborations ===
- "Baby I" in collaboration with Ariana Grande, from My Everything Japanese edition (August 25, 2014)
