= Nouvelle =

Nouvelle is a French word, the feminine form of "new". It may refer to:

Places

- Nouvelle, Quebec, a municipality in Quebec, Canada
- Nouvelle-Église, a commune in the Pas-de-Calais department, France
- Port-la-Nouvelle, a commune in the Aude department, France

Other

- Nouvelle, the French name for a novella
- Nouvelle AI, an approach to the artificial intelligence in the 1980s
- Nouvelle Chanson, a musical genre which emerged in France in the 1990s
- Battle of the Brave (Nouvelle-France), a 2004 historical romance film directed by Jean Beaudin
- Nouvelle histoire, a French historiographic current from the 1970s
- Nouvelle Planète, a Swiss non-profit organization
- Nouvelle Star, a French television series based on the Pop Idol programme
- Nouvelle Tendance, an art movement founded in Yugoslavia in 1961
- Nouvelle Vague, informal denomination of a movement of French filmmakers of the late 1950s and 1960s
- La Nouvelle Tribune, a weekly francophone Moroccan newspaper
