= Zora sourit =

Single by Celine Dion

from the album S'il suffisait d'aimer
- Language: French
- B-side: "Sur le même bateau"
- Released: 7 September 1998
- Studio: Méga (Paris)
- Genre: Pop
- Length: 3:52
- Label: Columbia
- Songwriters: Jean-Jacques Goldman; J. Kapler
- Producers: Jean-Jacques Goldman; Erick Benzi

Celine Dion singles chronology
"Immortality" (1998)	"Zora sourit" (1998)	"I'm Your Angel" (1998)

Music video
- "Zora sourit" on YouTube

"Zora sourit" (lit. 'Zora smiles') is a song by Canadian singer Celine Dion from her sixteenth studio album, S'il suffisait d'aimer (1998). It was written by Jean-Jacques Goldman and J. Kapler, and produced by Goldman and Erick Benzi. The song was released as the album's lead single on 7 September 1998. "Zora sourit" topped the chart in Quebec for five weeks. Elsewhere, it reached number seven in Poland, 12 in Belgium's Wallonia, 20 in France, and 25 in Switzerland. It was also certified gold in France and Belgium. The song's lyrics and music video denounce racism and promote tolerance.

== Background and release ==
After D'eux became the best-selling French-language album of all time, Dion reunited with Jean-Jacques Goldman to record another album together. S'il suffisait d'aimer was recorded between September 1997 and July 1998, and produced by Goldman and Erick Benzi. "Zora sourit", written by Goldman and his brother J. Kapler, was chosen as the lead single and premiered on the radio on 3 August 1998. Commercially, "Zora sourit" was released on 7 September 1998 in Belgium and Switzerland, and 14 September 1998 in France and the Netherlands. It was planned for release in the UK as part of a double A-side single with "To Love You More" on 21 September 1998, but this issue did not materialise. In 2005, it was included on Dion's greatest hits album, On ne change pas.

The song is dedicated to Algerian women. According to Dion, Zora represents not only Algeria, but also women from countries where they do not have the chance to be free and happy. The lyrics present the story of a woman who fights for herself and others, withstands insults and keeps her dignity despite difficulties.

== Commercial performance ==
In Quebec, "Zora sourit" entered the chart on 15 August 1998, topped it for five weeks and spent 33 weeks there in total. It also reached number seven in Poland. Commercially, the single was released one week after the album S'il suffisait d'aimer in Belgium, Switzerland and the Netherlands, and two weeks after the album in France. It reached number 12 in Belgium's Wallonia, 20 in France, 25 in Switzerland, 48 in Belgium's Flanders and 67 in the Netherlands. It was certified gold in France and Belgium. On the airplay charts in these countries, it reached number one in Wallonia, 2 in France, 13 in the Netherlands and 20 in Flanders.

== Music video ==
The music video for "Zora sourit" was directed by Yannick Saillet and released on 1 September 1998. The scenes with Dion were filmed on 30 July 1998 in Miami, Florida, while others were shot in Aubervilliers, Seine-Saint-Denis. The video is dedicated to Algerian women. It shows the titular character Zora walking down the street with a package, receiving different reactions from people passing by. At the end, Zora sends her package to Algeria. The music video denounces racism and promotes tolerance. In 2005, it was included on Dion's greatest hits DVD collection, On ne change pas.

== Formats and track listing ==
- French CD single
1. "Zora sourit" – 3:52
2. "Sur le même bateau" – 4:25
- French 12-inch and CD maxi-single
1. "Zora sourit" – 3:52
2. "Sur le même bateau" – 4:25
3. "Pour que tu m'aimes encore" – 4:14

== Charts ==
=== Weekly charts ===
Weekly chart performance
Chart (1998)	Peak position
Belgium (Ultratop 50 Flanders)	48
Belgium (Ultratop 50 Wallonia)	12
European Hot 100 Singles (Music & Media)	54
European Radio Top 50 (Music & Media)	34
Finland (Suomen virallinen radiosoittolista)	8
France (SNEP)	20
Netherlands (Dutch Top 40 Tipparade)	14
Netherlands (Single Top 100)	67
Poland Airplay (Music & Media)	7
Quebec Radio Songs (ADISQ)	1
Switzerland (Schweizer Hitparade)	25

=== Year-end charts ===
Year-end chart performance
Chart (1998)	Position
Belgium (Ultratop 50 Wallonia)	94

== Certifications ==
Certifications
Region	Certification	Certified units/sales
Belgium (BRMA)	Gold	25,000^{*}
France (SNEP)	Gold	250,000^{*}
^{*} Sales figures based on certification alone.

== Release history ==
Release history
Region	Date	Format	Label	Ref.
Belgium; Switzerland	7 September 1998	CD	Columbia	
France	14 September 1998	12-inch vinyl; CD	Columbia	
Netherlands	14 September 1998	CD	Columbia	

== See also ==
- Algerian women in France
- Women in Algeria
