= Nouvelle-France (soundtrack) =

2004 film soundtrack album

Soundtrack album by Patrick Doyle
- Released: November 25, 2004
- Genre: Soundtrack
- Length: 54.53
- Label: Sony Filmtrax

Singles from Nouvelle-France
- 1. "Ma Nouvelle-France" Released: 1 November 2004

Original soundtrack album of music from the film Battle of the Brave (Nouvelle-France), composed by Patrick Doyle.

== Tracks ==
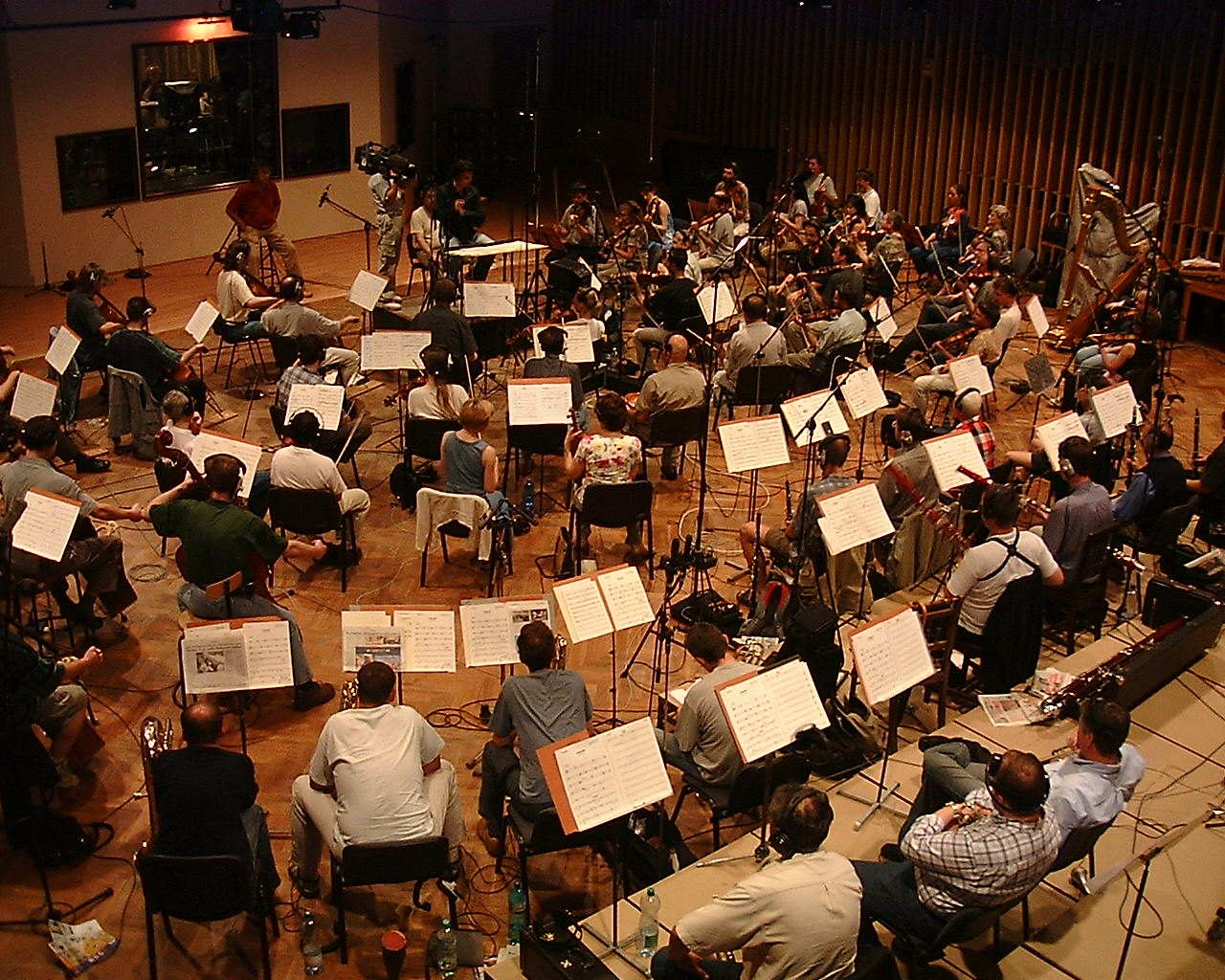
Prague recording session, June 2004

1. Ouverture (7.04)
2. Bonjour Marie (2.35)
3. Les Hommes De Bigot (1.59)
4. Le Bal / Gavotte & Menuet (2.30)
5. Des Etoiles Dans Ma Tête (2.11)
6. L'intervention d'Angelique (1.12)
7. La Lettre (3.29)
8. La Bataille De Québec (2.38)
9. Nouvelle / France N'est Plus (1.58)
10. Maillard & Marie-Loup (4.22)
11. Les Retrouvailles (4.26)
12. Bagarre Dans La Forêt (1.51)
13. La Berceuse De Marie-Loup (1.35)
14. Le Départ De France (4.18)
15. Le Destin De Marie-Loup (7.40)
16. La Fin De L'histoire (1.49)
17. Ma Nouvelle-France (3.10)

== Credits ==
- Music Composed by: Patrick Doyle
- Conducted by; James Shearman
- Orchestrated by: Patrick Doyle, James Shearman & Lawrence Ashmore
- Music Produced by: Maggie Rodford for Air-Edel
- Album Produced by: Patrick Doyle & Maggie Rodford
- Music Editor: James Bellamy
- Music Recorded at ICN 2 Studios, Prague
- Music Mixed at Air-Edel Studios, London
- Engineer: Nick Wollage
- Assistant Engineers: Nick Taylor, Cenda Kotzmann, Petr Kovanda, Jan Kotzman
- Programmer & Assistant to Patrick Doyle: Simon Greenaway
- Musicians Contractor: Zdena Pelikanova, Stephen Coleman
- Orchestra Leader: Vladimir Frank
- Music Published by: Patrick Doyle Music/Air-Edel Associates London

Patrick Doyle would like to thank: Lesley, Abigail, Nuala, Patrick and Elliot Doyle. All at Air-Edel. Jean Beaudin, Robert and Ashley Sidaway, Richard Goodreau, Celine Dion, Rene Angelil, Vito Luprano, Chris Neil, Vlado Meller and all the musicians of the Orchestra.

== Ma Nouvelle France ==
"Ma Nouvelle France" is performed by Celine Dion and is credited to Patrick Doyle and Luc Plamondon.

- Produced by: Chris Neil
- Instruments programmed & played by: Martin Sutton
- Guitars: Robbie McCintosh
- Celine Dion recorded at Digital Insights Studios, Las Vegas
- Music recorded at Studio Vale House, Bucks
- Mixed by: Humberto Gatica
- Assisted by: Francois Lalonde
- Mixed at Studio Westlake, Los Angeles
