= Ma Nouvelle-France =

Promotional single by Celine Dion

from the album Nouvelle-France
- Language: French
- Released: 19 November 2004
- Recorded: 3 October 2004
- Studio: Vale House (Buckinghamshire); Digital Insight (Las Vegas)
- Genre: Pop
- Length: 3:11
- Label: Filmtrax
- Songwriters: Luc Plamondon; Patrick Doyle
- Producer: Christopher Neil

"Ma Nouvelle-France" (lit. 'My New France') is a song by Canadian singer Celine Dion, recorded for the soundtrack of the 2004 historical drama film Nouvelle-France. Written by Luc Plamondon and Patrick Doyle and produced by Christopher Neil, it was released as a promotional single in Quebec in November 2004 and reached number seven on the regional radio chart.

== Background and release ==
Nouvelle-France, directed by Jean Beaudin, is a historical drama set in the mid‑18th century during the conflict between England and France for control of Canada. The film premiered in Canada on 19 November 2004 and in France on 20 July 2005. The accompanying soundtrack was composed by Patrick Doyle.

Dion agreed to record the film's theme song, "Ma Nouvelle-France", written by Plamondon and Doyle and produced by Neil. She recorded her vocals on 3 October 2004 at Digital Insight Studios in Las Vegas, while the instrumental tracks were recorded earlier at Vale House Studio in Buckinghamshire, England. In 2005, the song was included on Dion's greatest hits album On ne change pas.

== Commercial performance ==
"Ma Nouvelle-France" entered the Quebec radio chart on 13 November 2004 and peaked at number seven. It remained on the chart for 28 weeks.

== Music video ==
The music video was directed by Jean Beaudin. It shows Dion performing the song in the recording studio, intercut with scenes from the film. In 2005, the video was included as a bonus feature on Dion's greatest hits DVD, On ne change pas.

== Charts ==
Chart performance
Chart (2004)	Peak position
Quebec Radio Songs (ADISQ)	7
Quebec Radio Songs (BDS)	9
