= New France, Antigonish County =

Community in Nova Scotia, Canada

Coordinates: 45°33′25.43″N 61°43′40.54″W

New France in Nova Scotia

New France is a small community in the Canadian province of Nova Scotia, located in Antigonish County.
