= Let's Talk About Love World Tour =

1998–1999 concert tour by Celine Dion

- World tour by Celine Dion
- Promotional poster for the tour
- Location: North America; Asia; Europe
- Associated album: Let's Talk About Love
- Start date: 21 August 1998
- End date: 31 December 1999
- No. of shows: 97
- Supporting acts: André-Philippe Gagnon; Corey Hart; Dany Brillant; David Naster; Human Nature; Kealiʻi Reichel; Mike and the Mechanics; The Corrs; Xavier Naidoo
- Box office: $133 million

Celine Dion concert chronology
- Falling into You: Around the World (1996–1997); Let's Talk About Love World Tour (1998–1999); A New Day... (2003–2007)

The Let's Talk About Love World Tour was the ninth concert tour by Canadian singer Celine Dion, launched in support of her fifth English‑language studio album, Let's Talk About Love (1997). The tour began in Boston, United States, on 21 August 1998 and concluded in Montreal, Canada, on 31 December 1999. Spanning 97 performances across North America, Europe, and Asia, it became the highest‑grossing tour by a female artist of the 1990s, earning an estimated $133 million. In North America, it was the top‑grossing tour by a female artist in 1998 with $38.1 million in revenue, and the fourth highest‑grossing in 1999 with an additional $26.9 million. The tour also included two sold‑out concerts at the Stade de France in Paris, attended by more than 180,000 people. It received generally positive reviews, with critics praising Dion's vocal performance. At the 1998 Pollstar Awards, it earned nominations for Major Tour of the Year and Most Creative Stage Production.

== Background ==
Following her win at the 25th American Music Awards, Dion announced plans for a new tour beginning in the summer of 1998. Early preview concerts in Melbourne and Honolulu included a setlist based on the Falling into You: Around the World tour, with the addition of "The Reason" and "My Heart Will Go On". The tour was officially announced in February 1998 and scheduled to open on 21 August in Boston.

The tour received regional sponsorships from Procter & Gamble in Canada, Avon in Europe, and Ericsson in the United States. Dion also inaugurated the National Car Rental Center in Sunrise, Florida, performing for nearly 20,000 attendees.

Dion stated that the setlist would include songs from her then‑current album, earlier hits, and several French‑language selections.

As the tour extended into 1999, Dion performed in Asia and additional North American cities. After her husband René Angélil was diagnosed with throat cancer, she postponed the remaining North American dates and cancelled part of the European leg, later resuming the tour in June 1999. After the European shows, Dion announced a New Year's Eve event in Montreal. The Millennium Concert introduced a revised setlist and guest performances by Canadian artists.

In October 1999, Dion opened the new Pepsi Center in Denver, dedicating the concert to victims of the Columbine High School massacre and donating all proceeds to the Colorado Organization of Victim Assistance. She later stated that this would be her final tour before taking a break to start a family.

== About the stage ==
The tour introduced a new staging concept for Dion, as the show was presented in the round. Stage designer Yves Aucoin explained that he aimed to create a large-scale production while preserving a sense of intimacy. The heart-shaped stage incorporated five circular platforms capable of raising and lowering performers. It was constructed by Scène Éthique. Above the stage, four large video screens were arranged in a circular formation, while the stage floor incorporated video panels using Jumbotron technology.

Dion initially felt nervous performing in this configuration, as it offered little opportunity to rest while on stage. She noted that the idea was inspired by a Stevie Wonder concert she attended as a child. The entire production cost more than $10 million. For certain venues, such as in Munich, a 180-degree stage layout was used due to space limitations.

== Critical reception ==
The tour received generally positive reviews, with critics praising Dion's vocal control, emotional delivery, and versatility as a live performer.

For the opening concert in Boston, Steve Morse of The Boston Globe wrote that "despite Dion's nerves, she was able to pull off a successful concert", adding that "for pure entertainment, however, this was a volcanic triumph". Dion thanked the audience for being "lucky charm people", as it was the third time she had launched a world tour in the city.

In Oakland, James Sullivan of the San Francisco Chronicle noted Dion's strength as a live vocalist. He described the show's most compelling moment as a medley performed with her band at the front of the stage, noting that each song was delivered "with tender care—no small feat in a basketball gym". He also remarked that "All the Way" avoided excess sentimentality, with the accordion adding a touch of her French‑language roots.

Adam Sandler of Variety also reviewed the tour positively, writing that Dion "kept the vocal histrionics and hyper stage movements she has become known for to a minimum", instead focusing on vocal control and a more relaxed stage presence.

In Toronto, Jane Stevenson of Jam! awarded the concert four out of five stars. She described the staging of the opening number, "Let's Talk About Love", noting the gradual rise of the nine‑member band and the later appearance of a children's choir for the finale.

== Broadcasts and recordings ==
The first glimpse of the tour appeared in the music video for "S'il suffisait d'aimer", recorded during Dion's concert in Chicago in September 1998. Footage from that performance, along with material from one of the December 1998 shows in Montreal, was later included in the television special Un an avec Céline, hosted by Julie Snyder. The final concert at the National Car Rental Center was filmed and broadcast on The Oprah Winfrey Show, which also included behind‑the‑scenes segments. Dion additionally performed "To Love You More" live in Tokyo for the UNCF's An Evening of Stars. The millennium concert was aired on TVA in Canada.

The concerts at the Stade de France in Paris were recorded for a CD/DVD release titled Au cœur du stade. During the show, Jean-Jacques Goldman joined Dion for "J'irai où tu iras", while "To Love You More" included violinist Taro Hakase, and Diana King appeared on screen during "Treat Her Like a Lady". The accompanying CD presented an abbreviated version of the concert, focusing primarily on her French‑language repertoire. A live video of "Dans un autre monde" was used to promote both the CD and DVD editions.

== Set list ==
The following set list is taken from the 1998 US leg of the tour and does not represent all concerts.

1. "Let's Talk About Love"
2. "Declaration of Love"
3. "Because You Loved Me"
4. "The Reason"
5. "It's All Coming Back to Me Now"
6. "To Love You More"
7. "Treat Her Like a Lady"
8. "Tell Him"
9. "S'il suffisait d'aimer"
10. "Zora sourit"
11. "Love Is on the Way"
12. "All by Myself"
13. Acoustic medley: "The First Time Ever I Saw Your Face" / "Because" / "Tears in Heaven" / "All the Way"
14. "Love Can Move Mountains"
15. Bee Gees medley: "Stayin' Alive" / "You Should Be Dancing"
16. "Immortality"
17. "My Heart Will Go On"

=== Notes ===
- During "Let's Talk About Love", Dion was joined by a local children's choir at each concert.
- Diana King joined Dion for "Treat Her Like a Lady" in New York on 3 September 1998 and in Orlando on 2 October 1998.
- The music video for "S'il suffisait d'aimer" was filmed at the September 1998 concert in Chicago.
- Dion performed "Immortality" with the Bee Gees in Pittsburgh on 29 November 1998.
- Dion performed "The Reason" with Carole King in Montreal on 7 December 1998.
- The 18 December 1998 performance of "Treat Her Like a Lady" in Montreal was used for the single's music video.
- Dion performed "J'irai où tu iras" with Jean-Jacques Goldman at the 1999 concerts in Paris.
- In French-speaking countries, additional French-language songs were included.

== Tour dates ==
List of 1998 concerts
Date (1998)	City	Country	Venue	Opening act	Attendance	Revenue
21 August	Boston	United States	FleetCenter	André-Philippe Gagnon	35,342 / 35,342	$1,950,481
22 August	Boston	United States	FleetCenter	André-Philippe Gagnon	35,342 / 35,342	$1,950,481
25 August	Philadelphia	United States	CoreStates Center	André-Philippe Gagnon	19,438 / 19,438	$1,110,747
26 August	Washington, D.C.	United States	MCI Center	André-Philippe Gagnon	—N/a (Note: The concert was sold out.)	—N/a
30 August	East Rutherford	United States	Continental Airlines Arena	André-Philippe Gagnon	19,075 / 19,075	$1,172,810
31 August	Uniondale	United States	Nassau Veterans Memorial Coliseum	André-Philippe Gagnon	16,909 / 16,909	$1,004,330
3 September	New York City	United States	Madison Square Garden	André-Philippe Gagnon	37,448 / 37,448	$2,256,115
4 September	New York City	United States	Madison Square Garden	André-Philippe Gagnon	37,448 / 37,448	$2,256,115
8 September	Toronto	Canada	Molson Amphitheatre	André-Philippe Gagnon	41,666 / 41,854	$1,395,742
9 September	Toronto	Canada	Molson Amphitheatre	André-Philippe Gagnon	41,666 / 41,854	$1,395,742
14 September	Chicago	United States	United Center	André-Philippe Gagnon	38,436 / 38,436	$2,402,720
15 September	Chicago	United States	United Center	André-Philippe Gagnon	38,436 / 38,436	$2,402,720
18 September	Cleveland	United States	Gund Arena	André-Philippe Gagnon	19,776 / 19,776	$1,132,585
19 September	Cincinnati	United States	The Crown	André-Philippe Gagnon	—N/a	—N/a
22 September	Auburn Hills	United States	The Palace of Auburn Hills	André-Philippe Gagnon	41,212 / 41,212	$2,253,511
23 September	Auburn Hills	United States	The Palace of Auburn Hills	André-Philippe Gagnon	41,212 / 41,212	$2,253,511
25 September	Chapel Hill	United States	Dean Smith Center	André-Philippe Gagnon	19,942 / 19,942	$1,031,378
27 September	Charlotte	United States	Charlotte Coliseum	André-Philippe Gagnon	18,530 / 18,530	$1,009,233
28 September	Nashville	United States	Nashville Arena	André-Philippe Gagnon	17,805 / 17,805	$980,536
30 September	Tampa	United States	Ice Palace	André-Philippe Gagnon	17,987 / 17,987	$986,115
2 October	Orlando	United States	Orlando Arena	André-Philippe Gagnon	16,382 / 16,382	$916,610
3 October (Note: The concert opened the National Car Rental Center.)	Sunrise	United States	National Car Rental Center	André-Philippe Gagnon	—N/a	—N/a
7 October	Calgary	Canada	Canadian Airlines Saddledome	André-Philippe Gagnon	15,614 / 15,614	$625,517
9 October	Vancouver	Canada	General Motors Place	André-Philippe Gagnon	18,858 / 18,858	$656,914
10 October	Seattle	United States	KeyArena	André-Philippe Gagnon	15,306 / 15,306	$844,925
13 October	Oakland	United States	Network Associates Coliseum	André-Philippe Gagnon	17,832 / 17,832	$1,115,100
14 October	San Jose	United States	San Jose Arena	André-Philippe Gagnon	17,648 / 17,648	$1,073,177
16 October	Las Vegas	United States	Thomas & Mack Center	André-Philippe Gagnon	17,013 / 17,842	$1,178,721
21 October	Inglewood	United States	Great Western Forum	André-Philippe Gagnon	14,821 / 14,821	$894,590
22 October	Anaheim	United States	Arrowhead Pond of Anaheim	André-Philippe Gagnon	16,043 / 16,043	$923,845
25 October	Phoenix	United States	America West Arena	André-Philippe Gagnon	17,489 / 17,489	$995,343
29 November (Note: The concert was rescheduled from 12 September due to safety concerns.)	Pittsburgh	United States	Civic Arena	André-Philippe Gagnon	17,347 / 17,347	$986,476
1 December	Albany	United States	Pepsi Arena	André-Philippe Gagnon	13,774 / 13,774	$853,295
5 December (Note: The concert benefited Cystic Fibrosis Canada.)	Halifax	Canada	Halifax Metro Centre	André-Philippe Gagnon	10,000 / 10,000	$367,401
7 December	Montreal	Canada	Molson Centre	André-Philippe Gagnon	142,485 / 142,485	$5,070,308
8 December	Montreal	Canada	Molson Centre	André-Philippe Gagnon	142,485 / 142,485	$5,070,308
11 December	Montreal	Canada	Molson Centre	André-Philippe Gagnon	142,485 / 142,485	$5,070,308
12 December	Montreal	Canada	Molson Centre	André-Philippe Gagnon	142,485 / 142,485	$5,070,308
13 December	Montreal	Canada	Molson Centre	André-Philippe Gagnon	142,485 / 142,485	$5,070,308
17 December	Montreal	Canada	Molson Centre	André-Philippe Gagnon	142,485 / 142,485	$5,070,308
18 December	Montreal	Canada	Molson Centre	André-Philippe Gagnon	142,485 / 142,485	$5,070,308

List of 1999 concerts
Date (1999)	City	Country	Venue	Opening act(s)	Attendance	Revenue
25 January	Hong Kong	China	Former site of Kai Tak Airport	Human Nature	35,000	—N/a
28 January	Osaka	Japan	Osaka Dome	Human Nature	—N/a (Note: All Japan concerts sold out on the first day of public sale.)	—N/a
29 January	Osaka	Japan	Osaka Dome	Human Nature	—N/a	—N/a
31 January	Tokyo	Japan	Tokyo Dome	Human Nature	—N/a	—N/a
1 February	Tokyo	Japan	Tokyo Dome	Human Nature	—N/a	—N/a
3 February	Nagoya	Japan	Nagoya Dome	Human Nature	—N/a	—N/a
12 February	Honolulu	United States	Aloha Stadium	Kealiʻi Reichel	22,381 / 22,381	$1,326,805
25 March	Minneapolis	United States	Target Center	André-Philippe Gagnon	17,791 / 17,791	$963,771
26 March	Milwaukee	United States	Bradley Center	André-Philippe Gagnon	18,765 / 18,765	$1,019,734
29 March	Kansas City	United States	Kemper Arena	David Naster	18,471 / 18,471	$982,038
31 March	Indianapolis	United States	Market Square Arena	André-Philippe Gagnon	15,697 / 15,697	$898,713
2 April	Dallas	United States	Reunion Arena	André-Philippe Gagnon	17,765 / 17,765	$993,233
4 April	San Antonio	United States	Alamodome	André-Philippe Gagnon	17,715 / 17,715	$1,047,750
6 April	Memphis	United States	The Pyramid	André-Philippe Gagnon	15,991 / 17,000	$948,130
7 April	Birmingham	United States	BJCC Arena	André-Philippe Gagnon	17,224 / 17,500	$942,019
11 April	Houston	United States	Compaq Center	André-Philippe Gagnon	15,847 / 15,847	$904,499
12 April	New Orleans	United States	Louisiana Superdome	André-Philippe Gagnon	20,047 / 20,047	$1,153,562
14 June	Amsterdam	Netherlands	Amsterdam Arena	André-Philippe Gagnon	64,652 / 64,652	$3,048,136
16 June	Brussels	Belgium	King Baudouin Stadium	Dany Brillant; André-Philippe Gagnon	59,876 / 59,876	$3,571,396
19 June	Paris	France	Stade de France	Dany Brillant; André-Philippe Gagnon	180,102 / 180,102	$10,393,539
20 June	Paris	France	Stade de France	Dany Brillant; André-Philippe Gagnon	180,102 / 180,102	$10,393,539
1 July	Zurich	Switzerland	Letzigrund	Xavier Naidoo	42,040 / 42,040	$3,089,260
3 July	Munich	Germany	Olympiastadion	Xavier Naidoo	57,479 / 57,479	$3,413,513
6 July	Sheffield	England	Don Valley Stadium	Mike and the Mechanics; André-Philippe Gagnon	43,469 / 45,079	$2,538,511
8 July	Edinburgh	Scotland	Murrayfield Stadium	The Corrs; André-Philippe Gagnon	53,013 / 60,000	$2,138,530
10 July	London	England	Wembley Stadium	Mike and the Mechanics; André-Philippe Gagnon	122,397 / 122,397	$6,189,037
11 July	London	England	Wembley Stadium	Mike and the Mechanics; André-Philippe Gagnon	122,397 / 122,397	$6,189,037
8 September (Note: The concert in Montreal on 8 September 1999 was originally scheduled for 6 May 1999, but it was rescheduled due to René Angélil's health issues.)	Montreal	Canada	Molson Centre	—N/a	41,666 / 41,854	$1,413,409
9 September (Note: Rescheduled from 7 May due to René Angélil's health issues.)	Montreal	Canada	Molson Centre	—N/a	41,666 / 41,854	$1,413,409
11 September (Note: Rescheduled from 4 May due to René Angélil's health issues.)	Quebec City	Canada	Colisée Pepsi	—N/a	—N/a	—N/a
13 September (Note: Rescheduled from 2 May due to René Angélil's health issues.)	Ottawa	Canada	Corel Centre	Corey Hart	32,437 / 32,437	$1,436,977
14 September	Ottawa	Canada	Corel Centre	Corey Hart	32,437 / 32,437	$1,436,977
17 September (Note: Rescheduled from 29 April due to René Angélil's health issues.)	Toronto	Canada	Air Canada Centre	Corey Hart	37,138 / 37,138	$1,789,503
18 September (Note: Rescheduled from 30 April due to René Angélil's health issues.)	Toronto	Canada	Air Canada Centre	Corey Hart	37,138 / 37,138	$1,789,503
20 September (Note: Rescheduled from 16 April due to René Angélil's health issues.)	Buffalo	United States	Marine Midland Arena	Corey Hart	18,070 / 18,070	$977,299
24 September	Boston	United States	FleetCenter	Corey Hart	18,845 / 18,845	$1,130,203
25 September (Note: Rescheduled from 19 April due to René Angélil's health issues.)	Providence	United States	Providence Civic Center	Corey Hart	12,828 / 12,828	$644,582
27 September (Note: Rescheduled from 17 April due to René Angélil's health issues.)	Columbus	United States	Schottenstein Center	Corey Hart	16,370 / 16,370	$924,251
29 September (Note: Rescheduled from 9 April due to René Angélil's health issues; benefited the Nebraska AIDS Project.)	Omaha	United States	Omaha Civic Auditorium	Corey Hart	9,115 / 9,427	$426,120
1 October	Denver	United States	Pepsi Center	Corey Hart	16,961 / 18,018	$1,083,980
3 October (Note: Rescheduled from 14 April due to René Angélil's health issues.)	St. Louis	United States	Kiel Center	Corey Hart	19,354 / 19,354	$1,980,306
7 October	New York City	United States	Radio City Music Hall	—N/a	5,566 / 5,566	$255,418
22 October	Atlantic City	United States	Circus Maximus Theater	—N/a	—N/a	—N/a
23 October	Atlantic City	United States	Circus Maximus Theater	—N/a	—N/a	—N/a
24 October	Atlantic City	United States	Circus Maximus Theater	—N/a	—N/a	—N/a
5 November	Sunrise	United States	National Car Rental Center	Corey Hart	18,179 / 18,701	$1,114,765
31 December	Montreal	Canada	Molson Centre	—N/a	20,001 / 20,001	$3,595,079
Total					1,798,253 / 1,811,231 (99%)	$133,000,000

=== Cancelled concerts ===
List of 1999 cancelled concerts
Date (1999)	City	Country	Venue	Reason	Ref.
27 May	Dublin	Ireland	Croke Park	René Angélil's health issues	
29 May	Belfast	Northern Ireland	Botanic Gardens	René Angélil's health issues	
31 May	Birmingham	England	Alexander Stadium	René Angélil's health issues	
3 June	Frankfurt	Germany	Waldstadion	René Angélil's health issues	
5 June	Gothenburg	Sweden	Ullevi Stadium	René Angélil's health issues	
8 June	Vienna	Austria	Praterstadion	René Angélil's health issues	
12 June	Cologne	Germany	Müngersdorfer Stadium	René Angélil's health issues	
22 June	Lyon	France	Stade de Gerland	René Angélil's health issues	
24 June	Marseille	France	Stade Vélodrome	René Angélil's health issues	
27 June	Lisbon	Portugal	Estádio José Alvalade	René Angélil's health issues	
29 June	Barcelona	Spain	Palau Sant Jordi	René Angélil's health issues	

== Personnel ==
Sources:

- Celine Dion – lead vocals

=== Band ===
- Claude "Mego" Lemay – keyboards
- Dominique Messier – drums
- Marc Langis – bass
- Yves Frulla – keyboards
- André Coutu – guitars
- Paul Picard – percussion
- Taro Hakase – violin on "To Love You More"
- Elise Duguay – backing vocals, cello, tin whistle
- Julie LeBlanc – backing vocals
- Terry Bradford – backing vocals (1998)
- Gregory Charles – backing vocals (Montreal 1998)
- Barnev Valsaint – backing vocals (1999)

=== Production ===
- Suzanne Gingue – tour director
- Ian Donald – production director
- Michel Dion – assistant to the tour director
- Danis Savage – front-of-house sound engineer
- Darrell Featherstone – security (1999)
- Daniel Baron – stage sound engineer
- François Desjardins – sound system technician
- Marc Beauchamp – sound system technician
- Marc Thériault – sound system technician
- Yves Aucoin – lighting director
- Normand Chassé – assistant lighting director
- Jean-François Canuel – lighting technician
- Antoine Malette – lighting technician
- Michel Pommerleau – lighting technician
- Jean-François Dubois – band gear technician
- Guy Vignola – band gear technician
- Stéphane Hamel – band gear technician
- Donald Chouinard – head carpenter
- Tonje Wold – set designer
- Frédéric Morosovsky – head rigger
- Patrick Angélil – production assistant
- Gerard Pullicino – DVD director
- Vito Luprano – DVD producer

== See also ==
- List of highest-grossing concert tours
- List of highest-grossing concert tours by women
