= On ne change pas (song) =

Single by Celine Dion

from the album S'il suffisait d'aimer
- Language: French
- B-side: "Sur le même bateau"
- Released: 1 March 1999
- Studio: Méga (Paris)
- Genre: Pop
- Length: 4:08
- Label: Columbia
- Songwriter: Jean-Jacques Goldman
- Producers: Jean-Jacques Goldman; Erick Benzi

Celine Dion singles chronology
"S'il suffisait d'aimer" (1998)	"On ne change pas" (1999)	"Treat Her Like a Lady" (1999)

Music video
- "On ne change pas" on YouTube

"On ne change pas" (lit. 'We don't change') is a song by Canadian singer Celine Dion from her sixteenth studio album, S'il suffisait d'aimer (1998). It was written by Jean-Jacques Goldman and produced by Goldman and Erick Benzi. The song was released as the album's third single on 1 March 1999. "On ne change pas" topped the chart in Quebec for six weeks. Elsewhere, it reached number 11 in Poland, number 16 in Belgium's Wallonia, and number 17 in France.

== Background and release ==
After D'eux became the best-selling French-language album of all time, Dion reunited with Jean-Jacques Goldman to record another album together. S'il suffisait d'aimer was recorded between September 1997 and July 1998, and produced by Goldman and Erick Benzi. "On ne change pas", written by Goldman, was selected as the third single. It was released commercially on 1 March 1999 in France and 15 March 1999 in Belgium. The song reflects on childhood and adolescence, with lyrics expressing that people do not change. Dion has said that she still feels like a little girl from Charlemagne, Quebec. She performed the song frequently during her concerts. In 2005, it was included on her greatest hits album, On ne change pas.

== Commercial performance ==
In Quebec, "On ne change pas" entered the chart on 27 February 1999, topped it for six weeks, and spent 51 weeks there in total. In Europe, it reached number 11 in Poland, number 16 in Belgium's Wallonia, and number 17 in France. On the airplay charts in those two countries, "On ne change pas" reached number three in Wallonia and number five in France. It was certified gold in Canada.

== Music video ==
The music video for "On ne change pas" was directed by Gilbert Namiand and released in March 1999. Dion appears only in a photograph taken of her with her grade-school class at age eight. A second version of the video was later released, using similar material but also including scenes of Dion in the recording studio, as well as fragments from her earlier music videos and concerts. In 2005, the original version was included on Dion's greatest hits DVD collection, On ne change pas.

== Formats and track listing ==
- French CD single
1. "On ne change pas" – 4:08
2. "Sur le même bateau" – 4:25

== Charts ==
=== Weekly charts ===
Weekly chart performance
Chart (1999)	Peak position
Belgium (Ultratip Bubbling Under Flanders)	17
Belgium (Ultratop 50 Wallonia)	16
European Hot 100 Singles (Music & Media)	64
France (SNEP)	17
Poland Airplay (Music & Media)	11
Quebec Radio Songs (ADISQ)	1

=== Year-end charts ===
Year-end chart performance
Chart (1999)	Position
Belgium (Ultratop 50 Wallonia)	70
Belgium Francophone (Ultratop 50 Wallonia)	29
France (SNEP)	85

== Certifications ==
Certifications
Region	Certification	Certified units/sales
Canada (Music Canada)	Gold	40,000^{‡}
^{‡} Sales+streaming figures based on certification alone.

== Release history ==
Release history
Region	Date	Format	Label	Ref.
France	1 March 1999	CD	Columbia	
Belgium	15 March 1999	CD	Columbia	
