= New France, Digby County, Nova Scotia =

Canadian settlement (1892–1918)

Coordinates: 44°19′1.16″N 65°45′58.37″W

New France in Nova Scotia

New France is the site of a settlement located in Digby County in the Canadian province of Nova Scotia. It was founded in 1892 by the Stehelin family of France and abandoned following the First World War.

On February 3, 2010, the Nova Scotia Department of Natural Resources announced that it had acquired the property from J.D. Irving Limited.

== History ==
The Stehelins established the settlement to exploit the lumber resources of Nova Scotia. They dammed the Silver River to power a sawmill and built a pole railway to Weymouth 17 miles (27 km) away, from where the lumber was shipped to market. Long before electricity was available in the rest of Digby County the mill generated electricity for lighting and New France became known locally as "Electric City". For 18 years (1895–1912) the Stehelins ran a successful lumbering operation, but lumber prices decreased after the First World War ended and the operation couldn't be sustained. The buildings were finally torn down in the late 1950s, and all that remains today are some of the stone foundations.

The aristocratic Jean Jacques Stehelin arrived in Digby County in 1892, and built a homestead, large enough to house all fourteen members of his family, modelled on his family home back in St. Charles, France. In 1895 the family joined him and helped to build the rest of the settlement.

They developed a lumbering operation with a sawmill, and built a bunkhouse for the loggers. There was a cookhouse and gardens to provide the meals. The barn, home to horses and oxen, took two months to complete, and measured 50 by 50 feet (15 by 15 m), with a high roof. They built a large chicken coop, and bred Plymouth Rock hens for eggs. There were extensive kennels with dogs to accompany the men when they went out into the woods to hunt. Eventually there was a wine cellar, a chapel, an office, a clubhouse for relaxation, and a boathouse called the casino.

Two dams were built of logs and gravel to raise the level of Little Tusket Lake and channel the water flow to the Silver River. This powered the sawmill. There were three turbines which drove long hardwood shafts. Placed at intervals along the shafts were pulleys with belts that powered the gang saw, the haul-up, the trimmer, the edger, and the planer.

A small building beside the mill, called the powerhouse, housed a dynamo, a rotating machine that produced direct current electricity to provide light for the settlement's buildings, 20 years before Weymouth was first supplied with electric power in 1926.

The forests of Digby County were diverse and rich in hardwoods. The mill at New France exported maple, oak, beech and birch lumber for sale for flooring and doors, as well as red spruce and balsam fir for framing, and white pine for ships' masts. The mill could saw and trim 15,000 board feet (35 m^{3}) of lumber in a single day, and much of the product was sold to South America and England.

The Stehelin family entertained friends and business colleagues from around the world with dinners, dances, hunting and skating. New France blended European French, Acadian, Black and Mi'kmaq cultures. In its short history it had a major impact on the culture of southwestern Nova Scotia, including a role in the development of today's Université Sainte-Anne.

== Location ==
Incorrect mapping

Corrected mapping

New France is located at the north end of Langford Lake where it meets the Silver River.

Some maps have New France incorrectly placed about 2 miles (3.2 km) to the west of its actual location, on a road that may not be passable.

To drive to New France, take the dirt road (New France Road) from Southville Corner for 7 miles (11 km) and turn north on Silver River Road to the settlement, a total distance of approximately 10.5 miles (16.9 km).

== Current status ==
Maintained as a natural park by J.D. Irving Limited, the site is part of the company's Unique Areas Program. There were basic picnic facilities and the company had provided interpretive signage.

In 2010, Irving placed for sale about 170,000 acres (69,000 ha) of its woodland properties in Nova Scotia, including the New France site, Irving having first acquired the property from the Bowater Mersey Paper Company Limited in 1994. The Province of Nova Scotia later purchased a 21,000 acres (8,500 hectares) parcel that includes New France.
