= S'il suffisait d'aimer (song) =

Single by Celine Dion

from the album S'il suffisait d'aimer
- Language: French
- B-side: "Tous les blues sont écrits pour toi"
- Released: 23 November 1998
- Studio: Méga (Paris)
- Genre: Pop
- Length: 3:35
- Label: Columbia
- Songwriter: Jean-Jacques Goldman
- Producers: Jean-Jacques Goldman; Erick Benzi

Celine Dion singles chronology
"I'm Your Angel" (1998)	"S'il suffisait d'aimer" (1998)	"On ne change pas" (1999)

Music video
- "S'il suffisait d'aimer" (Behind-the-scenes) on YouTube

"S'il suffisait d'aimer" (lit. 'If only love could be enough') is a song by Canadian singer Celine Dion from her sixteenth studio album, S'il suffisait d'aimer (1998). It was written by Jean-Jacques Goldman and produced by Goldman and Erick Benzi. The song was released as the album's second single on 23 November 1998. It reached the top 10 in France, Quebec, and Belgium's Wallonia, and was certified gold in France and Belgium.

== Background and release ==
After D'eux became the best-selling French-language album of all time, Dion reunited with Jean-Jacques Goldman to record another album together. S'il suffisait d'aimer was recorded between September 1997 and July 1998, and produced by Goldman and Erick Benzi. The title track, written by Goldman, was issued as the second single. It was released commercially on 23 November 1998 in France and 7 December 1998 in Belgium. The song became the album's most successful single, and Dion performed it regularly during her concerts. In 2005, "S'il suffisait d'aimer" was included on her greatest hits album, On ne change pas.

== Commercial performance ==
In Quebec, "S'il suffisait d'aimer" entered the chart on 7 November 1998, peaked at number five, and spent 42 weeks on it. In Europe, the single reached number four in France, number six in Belgium's Wallonia, number 72 in Belgium's Flanders, and number 19 on the European Hot 100 Singles chart. It was certified gold in France, Belgium, and Canada.

== Music video ==
The official live music video for "S'il suffisait d'aimer" was recorded in September 1998 in Chicago, Illinois during the Let's Talk About Love World Tour. It was directed by Yannick Saillet. In 2005, the video was included on Dion's greatest hits DVD collection, On ne change pas.

== Formats and track listing ==
- French CD single #1
1. "S'il suffisait d'aimer" – 3:35
2. "Tous les blues sont écrits pour toi" – 4:50
- French CD single #2
1. "S'il suffisait d'aimer" – 3:35
2. "I'm Your Angel" (radio version) – 4:49

== Charts ==
=== Weekly charts ===
Weekly chart performance
Chart (1998–1999)	Peak position
Belgium (Ultratop 50 Flanders)	72
Belgium (Ultratop 50 Wallonia)	6
European Hot 100 Singles (Music & Media)	19
France (SNEP)	4
Quebec Radio Songs (ADISQ)	5

=== Year-end charts ===
1998 year-end chart performance
Chart (1998)	Position
France (SNEP)	59

1999 year-end chart performance
Chart (1999)	Position
Belgium (Ultratop 50 Wallonia)	80
Belgium Francophone (Ultratop 50 Wallonia)	33
France (SNEP)	81

== Certifications ==
Certifications
Region	Certification	Certified units/sales
Belgium (BRMA)	Gold	25,000^{*}
Canada (Music Canada)	Gold	40,000^{‡}
France (SNEP)	Gold	250,000^{*}
^{*} Sales figures based on certification alone.^{‡} Sales+streaming figures based on certification alone.

== Release history ==
Release history
Region	Date	Format	Label	Ref.
France	23 November 1998	CD	Columbia	
Belgium	7 December 1998	CD	Columbia	
