= To Love You More =

1995 single by Celine Dion

Single by Celine Dion

from the album The Colour of My Love
- B-side: "To Love You More" (instrumental)
- Released: 21 October 1995
- Studio: Chartmarker; Record Plant
- Genre: Pop
- Length: 5:28
- Label: SMEJ
- Songwriters: David Foster; Junior Miles
- Producer: David Foster

Celine Dion singles chronology
| "Next Plane Out" (1995) | "To Love You More" (1995) | "Falling into You" (1996) |

Audio
- "To Love You More" on YouTube

"To Love You More" is a song recorded by Canadian singer Celine Dion, written by David Foster and Edgar Bronfman Jr., who used the pen name Junior Miles. Produced by Foster, it was first issued in Japan on 21 October 1995 as part of the local reissue of Dion's album The Colour of My Love. The song became a major commercial success, reaching number one on the Oricon Singles Chart and selling 1.5 million copies. In 1996, it was included on the Asian editions of Falling into You and on Live à Paris. The next year, "To Love You More" was added to the US and Latin American editions of Let's Talk About Love and released to the US radio in May 1998, where it topped the Billboard's Hot Adult Contemporary Tracks chart for eight weeks. Regarded as one of Dion's signature ballads, the song has been performed in several of her concert tours and included on her compilation albums.

== Background and release ==
"To Love You More" was recorded for the Japanese television drama Koibito yo (My Dear Lover) and included on the 1995 Japanese reissue of Dion's album The Colour of My Love. The track later appeared on the Asian edition of Falling into You, on Live à Paris—where it served as a radio single in Canada—and on the US edition of Let's Talk About Love, from which it was released as a promotional single. Commercial physical releases were limited to Japan, first as a mini CD single in 1995 and later as a maxi-single with remixes by Tony Moran in 1999.

Epic Records planned to issue a double A-side single of "Zora sourit" and "To Love You More" on two CD formats and cassette in the United Kingdom on 21 September 1998. Prior to the intended release, 12-inch promotional copies of "To Love You More" containing the Tony Moran remixes were distributed to clubs. The plans were later revised, and the "Zora sourit" / "To Love You More" single was ultimately not released in the UK.

The track was included on all editions of Dion's 1999 greatest hits album All the Way... A Decade of Song and on My Love: Ultimate Essential Collection in 2008.

== Commercial performance ==
"To Love You More" became a major hit in Japan, topping the Oricon Singles Chart for five weeks and selling 1.5 million copies. Dion was the first international artist to reach number one on the chart since Irene Cara with "Flashdance... What a Feeling" in 1983. The song remains the third best-selling single by an international artist in Japan, and the best-selling single by an international female artist. It is also one of only three international singles to have sold more than one million copies in the country. Dion is the most recent North American artist to reach number one on the chart.

In July 2010, a full-length realtone version was certified gold for 100,000 downloads.

In the United States, the edited radio version—omitting the violin bridge and part of the ending—received substantial airplay. It spent eight weeks at number one on the Hot Adult Contemporary Tracks chart and reached number 11 on the Hot 100 Airplay chart. In Canada, the song peaked at number four on the Quebec Airplay Chart and number five on the Canadian Adult Contemporary chart.

== Music video ==
In 1995, Sony Music Entertainment Japan issued a promotional video showing Dion performing the studio version. A second promotional video, released in 1996, presented a live performance from the Falling Into You Around the World Tour with violinist Taro Hakase.

== Live performances ==
"To Love You More" became one of Dion's most frequently performed songs. It appeared in the setlists of the Falling into You: Around the World, Let's Talk About Love World Tour, A New Day..., the Taking Chances World Tour, the 2018 tour, and the final year of her Las Vegas residency Celine. Dion also performed the song at BST Hyde Park in London on 5 July 2019 and during the Courage World Tour. Live versions appear on several of her DVDs, including Live in Las Vegas - A New Day....

== Accolades ==
The song received multiple awards, including the International Single Grand Prix at the Japan Gold Disc Awards, an ASCAP Pop Award, and two BMI Pop Awards for Most Performed Song in the United States.

== Formats and track listing ==
- 1995 Japanese 3-inch CD single
1. "To Love You More" – 5:28
2. "To Love You More" (instrumental) – 5:28
- 1999 Japanese CD single (dance mixes)
1. "To Love You More" (Tony Moran's crossover edit) – 4:53
2. "To Love You More" (Tony Moran's pop edit) – 5:53
3. "To Love You More" (Tony Moran's I'll be... waiting vocal mix) – 10:08
4. "To Love You More" – 5:30
- 1995 Japanese promotional CD single
1. "To Love You More" (radio edit) – 3:55
- 1998 US promotional CD single
1. "To Love You More" (radio edit) – 4:39
2. "To Love You More" (album version) – 5:28
- 1998 US promotional CD single and UK promotional 12-inch single
1. "To Love You More" (Tony Moran's pop edit) – 4:53
2. "To Love You More" (Tony Moran's crossover edit) – 4:53
3. "To Love You More" (Tony Moran's I'll be... waiting vocal) – 10:07
- 1998 US promotional 12-inch single
1. "To Love You More" (Tony Moran's I'll be... waiting vocal mix) – 10:10
2. "To Love You More" (Tony Moran's dubbing you more mix) – 9:35

== Personnel ==
- Celine Dion – vocals
- David Foster – arrangements, keyboards, producer
- Taro Hakase – violin
- Tsuneyoshi Saito – piano, synthesizer
- Yoshinobu Takeshita – bass, programming
- Lillias White – background vocals
- LaChanze – background vocals
- Roz Ryan – background vocals
- Cheryl Freeman – background vocals
- Vanéese Y. Thomas – background vocals
- Felipe Elgueta – engineering, programming
- Humberto Gatica – engineering, mixing
- Vito Luprano – executive producer
- Michael Thompson – guitar
- Junior Miles – lyrics
- Ross Hogarth – mixing
- Simon Franglen – synclavier programming

== Charts ==
=== Weekly charts ===
1995–1998 weekly chart performance
| Chart (1995–1998) | Peak position |
|---|---|
| Canada Top Singles (RPM) | 9 |
| Canada Adult Contemporary (RPM) | 1 |
| Canada CHR (BDS) | 15 |
| Iceland (Íslenski Listinn Topp 40) | 13 |
| Japan (Oricon Singles Chart) | 1 |
| Quebec Radio Songs (ADISQ) | 4 |
| US Radio Songs (Billboard) | 11 |
| US Adult Contemporary (Billboard) | 1 |
| US Adult Pop Airplay (Billboard) | 21 |
| US Pop Airplay (Billboard) | 22 |

1999 weekly chart performance
| Chart (1999) | Peak position |
|---|---|
| Japan (Oricon Singles Chart) Dance Mixes | 93 |

=== Year-end charts ===
1996 year-end chart performance
| Chart (1996) | Position |
|---|---|
| Japan (Oricon Singles Chart) | 20 |

1997 year-end chart performance
| Chart (1997) | Position |
|---|---|
| Canada Adult Contemporary (RPM) | 30 |

1998 year-end chart performance
| Chart (1998) | Position |
|---|---|
| US Hot 100 Airplay (Billboard) | 45 |
| US Adult Contemporary (Billboard) | 8 |
| US Adult Top 40 (Billboard) | 53 |
| US Mainstream Top 40 (Billboard) | 68 |

1999 year-end chart performance
| Chart (1999) | Position |
|---|---|
| Brazil (Crowley) | 77 |
| US Adult Contemporary (Billboard) | 38 |

== Certifications and sales ==
Certifications
| Region | Certification | Certified units/sales |
|---|---|---|
| Japan (RIAJ) Mini CD single | Million | 1,500,000 |
| Japan (RIAJ) Full-length ringtone | Gold | 100,000^{*} |
^{*} Sales figures based on certification alone.

== Release history ==
Release history
| Region | Date | Format | Label | Ref. |
|---|---|---|---|---|
| Japan | 21 October 1995 | 3-inch CD | SMEJ | |
| United States | 12 May 1998 | Radio | Epic | |
| Japan | 7 April 1999 | CD | SMEJ | |

== See also ==
- Japan Gold Disc Award
- List of best-selling singles in Japan
- List of Billboard Adult Contemporary number ones of 1998
