= Quelqu'un que j'aime, quelqu'un qui m'aime =

Promotional single by Celine Dion

from the album Dion chante Plamondon
- Language: French
- Released: August 1992
- Recorded: 8 September – 6 October 1991
- Studio: Face B (Paris)
- Genre: Pop
- Length: 3:40
- Label: Columbia
- Songwriters: Luc Plamondon; Erown
- Producers: Jannick Top; Serge Perathoner

Audio
- "Quelqu'un que j'aime, quelqu'un qui m'aime" on YouTube

"Quelqu'un que j'aime, quelqu'un qui m'aime" (lit. 'Someone I love, someone who loves me') is a French-language song by Canadian singer Celine Dion from her tenth studio album, Dion chante Plamondon (1991). Written by Luc Plamondon and Erown, and produced by Jannick Top and Serge Perathoner, it was released as the album's fourth promotional single in Quebec in August 1992. The song topped the province's radio chart for seven weeks and received a nomination for the Félix Award for Most Popular Song of the Year.

== Background and release ==
"Quelqu'un que j'aime, quelqu'un qui m'aime" was written by French-Canadian lyricist Luc Plamondon and Italian composer Roberto Masala, known professionally as Erown, and produced by Jannick Top and Serge Perathoner. It was one of four new songs created for Dion chante Plamondon, released in Canada in November 1991. In August 1992, the track was issued as the album's fourth promotional single in Quebec, following "Des mots qui sonnent", "L'amour existe encore", and "Je danse dans ma tête".

== Commercial performance ==
"Quelqu'un que j'aime, quelqu'un qui m'aime" entered the Quebec radio chart on 29 August 1992 and reached number one, remaining at the top for seven consecutive weeks. It spent 23 weeks on the chart overall.

== Accolades ==
In 1993, the song received a nomination for the Félix Award for Most Popular Song of the Year in Quebec.

== Charts ==
Chart performance
Chart (1992)	Peak position
Quebec Radio Songs (ADISQ)	1
