= Des mots qui sonnent =

"Des mots qui sonnent" may refer to:

- Des mots qui sonnent (album), by Celine Dion, originally released in Canada as Dion chante Plamondon
- "Des mots qui sonnent" (song), 1991 single from the album
