= Je danse dans ma tête =

Single by Celine Dion

from the album Dion chante Plamondon
- Language: French
- B-side: "Un garçon pas comme les autres (Ziggy)"
- Released: March 1992
- Recorded: 8 September – 6 October 1991
- Studio: Face B (Paris)
- Genre: Pop
- Length: 4:13
- Label: Columbia
- Songwriters: Luc Plamondon; Romano Musumarra
- Producer: Romano Musumarra

Celine Dion singles chronology
"Beauty and the Beast" (1991)	"Je danse dans ma tête" (1992)	"If You Asked Me To" (1992)

Music video
- "Je danse dans ma tête" on YouTube

"Je danse dans ma tête" (lit. 'I'm dancing in my head') is a song by Canadian singer Celine Dion from her tenth studio album, Dion chante Plamondon (1991). It was written by French-Canadian lyricist Luc Plamondon and Italian composer Romano Musumarra, and produced by Musumarra. In March 1992, "Je danse dans ma tête" was issued as the lead commercial single in France and the third promotional single in Quebec, Canada. It reached number three on the airplay chart in Quebec. The music video, directed by Alain DesRochers, received the Much Music Video Award for Best Adult Contemporary Video in 1992.

== Background and release ==
"Je danse dans ma tête" was written by French-Canadian lyricist Luc Plamondon and Italian composer Romano Musumarra, and produced by Musumarra. It was one of four new songs created for Dion chante Plamondon, released in Canada in November 1991. In March 1992, "Je danse dans ma tête" became the third promotional single in Quebec, following "Des mots qui sonnent" and "L'amour existe encore". That same month, it was issued commercially as the lead single in France, where the album was retitled Des mots qui sonnent and released in May 1992. The commercial single also included "Un garçon pas comme les autres (Ziggy)" and "Les uns contre les autres". The promotional single contained two remixes by Mark Frank and Musumarra (the "Europe mix" and "Europe mix" club version). On 18 May 1992, Dion performed the song on the French TV show Stars 90. In 2005, it was included on her greatest hits album On ne change pas.

== Critical reception ==
Music & Media wrote that Dion moved into dance-oriented material with "Je danse dans ma tête" while maintaining confidence in this direction. The magazine added that the chorus, with the word "danse" sung in a deliberate stutter, stands out as a memorable gimmick.

== Commercial performance ==
"Je danse dans ma tête" entered the Quebec airplay chart on 23 March 1992 and peaked at number three. It remained on the chart for 14 weeks.

== Music video ==
The music video was directed by Alain DesRochers and released in March 1992. It received the Much Music Video Award for Best Adult Contemporary Video in September 1992. In 2005, it was included on Dion's greatest hits DVD collection, On ne change pas.

== Formats and track listing ==
- French 7-inch, cassette, and 3-inch CD single
1. "Je danse dans ma tête" – 4:13
2. "Un garçon pas comme les autres (Ziggy)" – 2:56
- French CD single
1. "Je danse dans ma tête" – 4:13
2. "Un garçon pas comme les autres (Ziggy)" – 2:56
3. "Les uns contre les autres" – 3:09

== Charts ==
Chart (1992)	Peak position
Quebec Radio Songs (ADISQ)	3

== Release history ==
Region	Date	Format	Label	Ref.
France	March 1992	7-inch vinyl; cassette; 3-inch CD; CD	Columbia	
