= MuchMoreMusic Award =

The following is a list of the MuchMusic Video Awards winners for the MuchMoreMusic Award. This award is now defunct, and has not been awarded since 2007.

The category was formerly presented as the MuchMusic Video Award for Adult Contemporary Video, and was renamed the MuchMoreMusic Award with the launch of MuchMoreMusic in 1998.

Year	Artist	Video	Ref
1990	Céline Dion and Billy Newton-Davis	"Can't Live Without You"	
1991	Sarah McLachlan	"The Path of Thorns (Terms)"	
1992	Céline Dion	"Je danse dans ma tête"	
1993	Mae Moore	"Because of Love"	
1994	Sarah McLachlan	"Possession"	
1995	no award		
1996	no award		
1997	no award		
1998	Jann Arden	"The Sound Of"	
1999	Shania Twain	"That Don't Impress Me Much"	
2000	Shania Twain	"Man! I Feel Like a Woman!"	
2001	Nelly Furtado	"I'm Like a Bird"	
2002	Nelly Furtado	"Turn Off the Light"	
2003	Shania Twain	"Up!"	
2004	Sarah McLachlan	"Fallen"	
2005	Shania Twain	"Party for Two"	
2006	Michael Bublé	"Save the Last Dance for Me"	
2007	Nickelback	"Far Away"	
