= Celine Dion Parfums =

Line of perfumes

Fragrance by Celine Dion
- Released: 2003–present
- Label: Coty
- Tagline: Live to Love
- Website: Official website

Celine Dion Parfums is a line of celebrity-endorsed fragrances created by Canadian singer Celine Dion in partnership with Coty. By March 2010, global retail sales had exceeded $850 million. As of 2011, fourteen fragrances had been released, nine of which were issued in the United States. A new fragrance, Signature, was introduced in September 2011.

== Background ==
In 2003, Coty partnered with Dion to launch a range of fragrances, each intended to reflect a period in her career through distinct styles and scent profiles. The first fragrance, named after the singer, was released in 2003 and became a major commercial success. Its notes include water lily, orange blossom, and tiare flower, combined with amber, musk, and blonde woods.

== Fragrances ==
=== Celine Dion ===
The first fragrance was released on 25 March 2003, coinciding with the launch of her record-breaking A New Day... Las Vegas residency and her album One Heart. It became a strong commercial performer. Its composition includes red cherries, violets, lily of the valley, yellow roses, tiare, orange blossoms, jasmine, blonde woods, sandalwood, amber, and musk.

The fragrance won the Women's Fragrance of the Year – Popular Appeal award at the FiFi Awards in 2004. It was also nominated in the Women's Scent category at the 2004 Cosmetic Executive Women Beauty Awards and received three additional awards that year according to Dion's official website.

The fragrance launched in JCPenney stores and became the number one fragrance launch in the retailer's history, as well as the top fragrance launch in chain department stores and in broad distribution in 2003. More than three million units of Celine Dion Parfums were sold between 2003 and 2004.

=== Notes ===
The second fragrance, Notes, was released on 6 April 2004. Its top notes include mimosa, nectarine, gardenia, and water lily; middle notes include peony, heliotrope, and orchid; and base notes include Australian sandalwood, guaiac wood, vetiver, and white musk.

=== Belong ===
The third fragrance was released on 13 March 2005. Belong was a strong seller and won a FiFi Award in 2006 for Best Female Packaging. It was also nominated for Fragrance of the Year.

=== Always Belong ===
The fourth fragrance was released on 9 January 2006. Always Belong received a nomination at the 2007 FiFi Awards in the Women's Popular Appeal category.

=== Memento ===
The fifth fragrance, Memento, was issued as a Special Edition exclusively through Dion's official website and was released on 28 November 2005.

=== Enchanting ===
The sixth fragrance was released on 16 September 2006 in selected European countries and reached the United States in January 2007. Its notes include osmanthus, ripe red berries, cyclamen, orchid, gardenia, freesia, amber, sandalwood, and tonka bean.

Reviews were highly positive, with Fashion Magazine calling it a "Showstopper". On 8 June 2007, it received a special award from the French fragrance industry for Best Female Fragrance Launch in Mass Distribution in 2006. It was also nominated at the 2008 FiFi Awards in the Women's Popular Appeal category.

=== Spring in Paris ===
The seventh fragrance was released on 13 May 2007 as an Avon exclusive. It includes notes of redcurrant, blackcurrant, mandarin, lilac, osmanthus, lily of the valley, jasmine, musk, vanilla, and soft woods. The perfume was created by Richard Herpin.

=== Paris Nights ===
The eighth fragrance, released in August 2007, is a follow-up to Spring in Paris and was well received. Created by perfumer Karine Dubreuil, it aims to evoke the glamour of Parisian evenings. Its notes include wisteria, passion fruit, black violet, wild jasmine, broom, osmanthus, rose, vanilla, amber, cashmere, sandalwood, and patchouli.

=== Sensational ===
The ninth fragrance was released exclusively to TeamCeline members on 23 February 2008 and later worldwide. It opens with icy pear, plum, and apple, followed by mimosa, jasmine, freesia, and orris, and finishes with amber and musk. The fragrance won a Shape of Beauty Award in 2008 and was nominated at the 2009 FiFi Awards for Women's Popular Appeal.

=== Sensational Moments ===
The tenth fragrance was released on 28 February 2009. Its top notes include mandarin orange, blackberry, and pink grapefruit; middle notes include freesia, ginger, and pink peony; and base notes include hazelnut, musk, and white amber.

=== Chic ===
The eleventh fragrance was released in May 2009. It opens with green aquatic notes and watermelon, followed by peony, gardenia, lotus, and green violet, and ends with sandalwood, blonde wood, amber, and musk.

=== Spring in Provence ===
The twelfth fragrance, released in September 2009, was inspired by the region of Provence. Its notes include honeysuckle, mimosa absolute, fig blossom, and violet, with a base of ambrette, vetiver, and musk. According to Dion's official website, it is a rare and strictly limited edition.

=== Simply Chic ===
The thirteenth fragrance was released in March 2010 to strong reviews. Its notes include Sicilian bergamot, blackcurrant, and tangerine, followed by freesia and white roses, and ending with musk, white amber, patchouli, and sandalwood.

A dedicated mini-site was launched for the fragrance, including press materials, a Q&A with the creators, and ingredient information.

=== Pure Brilliance ===
The fourteenth fragrance, the eighth released in the United States, debuted on 11 September 2010. Dion described it as a delicate scent inspired by inner beauty. Coty executive Steve Mormoris noted the strong connection between Dion and her fans. The fragrance includes granny smith apple, pear, green leaves, freesia, honeysuckle, lily, muguet, musk, peach skin, and blonde wood.

=== Signature ===
The fifteenth fragrance was released in September 2011. Dion described it as a personal way to connect with her fans. Created by Firmenich perfumer Ilias Ermenidis, it includes mimosa, pink lady apple, guava, rose essence, jasmine, magnolia, musk, amberwood, and sandalwood.

=== Sensational – Luxe Blossom ===
The sixteenth fragrance was released in selected markets in 2013.

=== All for Love ===
The seventeenth fragrance, All for Love, was released in selected countries in April 2014 after a leaked photo of the packaging appeared online in March 2014.

== Achievements ==
- Celine Dion Parfums ranked number three among the best-selling celebrity fragrances in 2008 in the United States, according to a study conducted by Euromonitor International, with sales of $26.4 million.
- At the announcement of the release of Pure Brilliance, it was stated that global retail sales had reached $850 million, placing the line among the most successful celebrity fragrance brands.

== Awards ==
| Year | Award | Result |
|---|---|---|
| 2004 | FiFi Award for Women's Fragrance of the Year – Popular Appeal (Celine Dion Parfums) | Winner |
| 2004 | Cosmetic Executive Women Beauty Award for Women's Scent (Celine Dion Parfums) | Nomination |
| 2006 | FiFi Award for Women's Fragrance of the Year – Popular Appeal (Belong) | Nomination |
| 2006 | FiFi Award for Best Packaging – Women's Popular Appeal (Belong) | Winner |
| 2007 | FiFi Award for Women's Fragrance of the Year – Popular Appeal (Always Belong) | Nomination |
| 2007 | FiFi Award for Best Packaging – Women's Popular Appeal (Always Belong) | Nomination |
| 2007 | French Fragrance Industry Award – Best Female Fragrance Launch in Mass Distribution in 2006 (Enchanting) | Winner |
| 2008 | FiFi Award for Women's Fragrance of the Year – Popular Appeal (Enchanting) | Nomination |
| 2008 | Shape of Beauty Award for Mood Boosting Fragrance of the Year (Sensational) | Winner |
| 2009 | FiFi Award for Women's Fragrance of the Year – Popular Appeal (Sensational) | Nomination |
