= Celine Dion =

Canadian singer (born 1968)

Céline Dion CC OQ
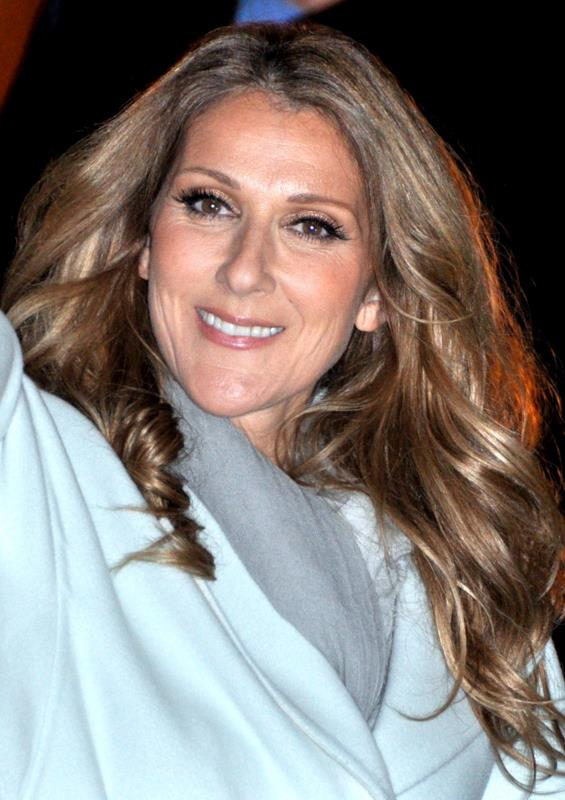
- Dion in 2012
- Born: Céline Marie Claudette Dion; 30 March 1968 (age 58); Charlemagne, Quebec, Canada
- Occupations: Singer; entrepreneur; philanthropist
- Years active: 1980–present
- Works: Albums; singles; songs; videography; performances
- Spouse: René Angélil (m. 1994; died 2016)
- Children: 3
- Mother: Thérèse Dion
- Awards: Full list
- Musical career
- Genres: Pop; soft rock
- Instrument: Vocals
- Labels: CBS; Epic; Columbia; 550; Legacy
- Website: celinedion.com

Céline Marie Claudette Dion (Note: English pronunciation: /seɪˌliːn diˈɒn/ say-LEEN dee-ON; although common to pronounce her first name as /səˈliːn/ sə-LEEN, the Longman Dictionary of Contemporary English has the pronunciation listed as /seɪˈliːn/ say-LEEN; in addition to /diˈɒn/ dee-ON, her last name is also pronounced in the UK as /ˈdiːɒn/ DEE-on.; French pronunciation: [selin maʁi klodɛt djɔ̃]; in Quebec French, Dion is pronounced [d͡zjɔ̃].) (born 30 March 1968) is a Canadian singer, entrepreneur and philanthropist. Dubbed the "Queen of Power Ballads", she is known for her impact on popular music through powerful, technically skilled vocals and commercially successful works. With over 200 million records sold worldwide, Dion is the best-selling Canadian recording artist, the best-selling French-language artist, and one of the best-selling musical artists of all time.

Born into a large family in Charlemagne, Quebec, Dion was discovered by her future manager and husband, René Angélil, and emerged as a teen star in her home country with eight French-language albums during the 1980s. She gained international recognition by winning the Eurovision Song Contest 1988, where she represented Switzerland with the song "Ne partez pas sans moi". Dion went on to release twelve English-language albums, including the best-selling albums The Colour of My Love (1993), Falling into You (1996), and Let's Talk About Love (1997), as well as A New Day Has Come (2002), her 21st-century bestseller. She also became known for performing cinematic theme songs, such as "Beauty and the Beast" for the Disney film of the same name (1991), "Because You Loved Me" for Up Close & Personal (1996), and "My Heart Will Go On" for Titanic (1997), which became one of the best-selling singles.

Dion continued releasing French-language albums between each English record, with D'eux (1995) becoming the best-selling French-language album. She also built her reputation as a live performer, with the Let's Talk About Love World Tour (1998–1999) and the Taking Chances World Tour (2008–2009)—which rank among the highest-grossing concert tours of the 1990s and the 2000s—as well as A New Day... (2003–2007), the highest-grossing concert residency. The Los Angeles Times named her the top-earning artist of the 2000s, with combined album sales and concert revenue exceeding $747 million. In 2022, Dion canceled her Courage World Tour following a diagnosis of stiff-person syndrome. In 2026, she began a concert residency in Paris.

Dion's accolades include five Grammy Awards, 20 Juno Awards, seven American Music Awards, nine Billboard Music Awards, and stars on the Hollywood Walk of Fame and Canada's Walk of Fame. Seven of her albums have sold at least 10 million copies worldwide. She was ranked among the greatest women in music by VH1 and the greatest voices in music by MTV. Dion is one of the highest-grossing touring artists, the second woman to accumulate US$1 billion in concert revenue, and one of the wealthiest musicians in the world. Forbes ranked her the highest-paid female musician of 1997, 1998, 2004 and 2006. She received honorary doctorates in music from the Berklee College of Music and the Université Laval. Dion was conferred with the French Legion of Honour and elevated to the Companion of the Order of Canada.

== Life and career ==
=== 1968–1989: Early life and career beginnings ===
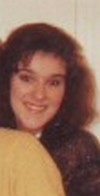
Dion in 1986

On 30 March 1968, Dion was born in Charlemagne, Quebec, 24 kilometres (15 mi) northeast of Montreal, the youngest of 14 children of Thérèse (née Tanguay, 1927–2020), a homemaker, and Adhémar Dion (1923–2003), a butcher, both of French Canadian heritage. Dion grew up wearing hand-me-downs and sharing a bed with several sisters. As a baby, she slept in a drawer instead of a crib to save money. She was bullied at school and called "Vampire" due to her teeth and skinny frame. Local tabloids even dubbed her "Canine Dion" in the teenage years of her career. She often spoke of running home from school to play music in the basement with her brothers and sisters. "I detested school", she would later write in her autobiography. "I had always lived surrounded by adults and children a lot older than me. I learned everything I needed to know from them. As far as I was concerned, real life existed around them." Dion's eldest sister was already in her twenties, married, and pregnant with her first child at the time that Dion's mother was pregnant with Dion.

Dion was raised Roman Catholic in a poor but, by her own account, happy home in Charlemagne. Music had always been a major part of the Dion family, and she was named after the song "Céline", which French singer Hugues Aufray had recorded two years before her birth. On 13 August 1973, she performed publicly for the first time at her brother Michel's wedding, singing Christine Charbonneau's "Du fil, des aiguilles et du coton". She continued to perform with her siblings in her parents' small piano bar called Le Vieux Baril, "The Old Barrel".

She suffered a number of accidents as a young child, including an incident at five years old when she was struck by a car as her father and brother Clément looked on. She was hospitalized briefly with a concussion. From an early age, she had dreamed of being a performer. In a 1994 interview with People, she recalled, "I missed my family and my home, but I don't regret having lost my adolescence. I had one dream: I wanted to be a singer." As a child in Quebec, Dion participated in Girl Guide programs as a member of Girl Guides of Canada.

At age 12, she collaborated with her mother and her brother Jacques to write and compose her first song, "Ce n'était qu'un rêve", whose title translates as "It Was Only a Dream" or "Nothing But A Dream". Michel sent the recording to music manager René Angélil, whose name he discovered on the back of a Ginette Reno album. Angélil was moved to tears by Dion's voice and decided to make her a star. In 1981, he mortgaged his home to fund her first record, La voix du bon Dieu, which later became a local No. 1 hit and made her an instant star in Quebec. Her popularity spread to other parts of the world when she competed in the 1982 Yamaha World Popular Song Festival in Tokyo and won the musician's award for "Top Performer" as well as the gold medal for "Best Song" with "Tellement j'ai d'amour pour toi".

By 1983, in addition to becoming the first Canadian artist to receive a gold record in France for the single "D'amour ou d'amitié" ("Of Love or of Friendship"), Dion had also won several Félix Awards, including "Best Female performer" and "Discovery of the Year". Further success came when she represented Switzerland in the Eurovision Song Contest 1988 with the song "Ne partez pas sans moi" and won the contest by a close margin. At age 18, after seeing a Michael Jackson performance, Dion told Angélil she wanted to be a star like Jackson. Though confident in her talent, Angélil realized her image needed to be changed for her to be marketed worldwide. She withdrew from the spotlight for a number of months, during which she underwent dental surgery to improve her appearance, and was sent to the École Berlitz in 1989 to improve her English. In 1989, during a concert on the Incognito tournée, she injured her voice. She consulted the otorhinolaryngologist William Gould, who gave her an ultimatum: have immediate surgery on her vocal cords or do not utilize them at all for three weeks. Dion chose the latter and underwent vocal training with William Riley.

=== 1990–1992: Unison, Dion chante Plamondon, and Celine Dion ===
Two years after she learned English, Dion made her debut into the Anglophone market with Unison (1990), the lead single having originally been recorded by English singer Junior in 1983 and later Laura Branigan. She incorporated the help of producers including Vito Luprano and David Foster. The album was largely influenced by 1980s soft rock music and quickly found a niche within the adult contemporary radio format. Unison also hit the right notes with critics: Jim Farber of Entertainment Weekly wrote her vocals were "tastefully unadorned", and she never attempted to "bring off styles that are beyond her". Stephen Thomas Erlewine of AllMusic declared it "a fine, sophisticated American debut". Singles from the album included "(If There Was) Any Other Way", "The Last to Know", "Unison", and "Where Does My Heart Beat Now", a mid-tempo soft-rock ballad made prominent use of the electric guitar. The latter became her first top-ten hit on the U.S. Billboard Hot 100, peaking at number four. In 1991, Dion was a featured soloist on "Voices That Care", a tribute to American troops fighting in Operation Desert Storm.

Her real international breakthrough came when she duetted with Peabo Bryson on the title track to Disney's animated film Beauty and the Beast (1991). It became her first top-ten hit in the UK and her second top-ten hit in the US. The song earned its songwriters an Academy Award for Best Song and gave Dion her first Grammy Award for Best Pop Performance by a Duo or Group with Vocal. "Beauty and the Beast" served as the lead single from her 1992 self-titled album, which, like her debut, had a strong pop rock influence combined with elements of soul and classical music. Owing to the success of the lead-off single and her collaborations with David Foster and Diane Warren, the album was even more well-received commercially than Unison; it was certified diamond in Canada and double platinum in the U.S. The album's second single "If You Asked Me To" (a cover of Patti LaBelle's song from the 1989 movie Licence to Kill) became her first number-one single in Canada and peaked at number four on the U.S. Billboard Hot 100.

Also during this time, Dion released the Francophone album Dion chante Plamondon. The album consisted mostly of covers, but featured four new songs: "Des mots qui sonnent", "Je danse dans ma tête", "Quelqu'un que j'aime, quelqu'un qui m'aime", and "L'amour existe encore". It was originally released in Canada and France between 1991 and 1992, then later received an international release in 1994, the first French Celine Dion album to do so. "Un garçon pas comme les autres (Ziggy)" became a smash hit in France, reaching No. 2 and being certified gold. In Quebec, the album was certified Gold the day it was released.

By 1992, Unison, Celine Dion, and numerous high-profile media appearances had propelled Dion to superstardom in North America. She had achieved one of her main objectives: wedging her way into the Anglophone market and achieving fame. However, while she was experiencing rising success in the U.S., her French fans in Canada criticized her for neglecting them. She would later rebuff these criticisms at the 1991 Félix Awards show, where, after winning "English Artist of the Year", she openly declined the award. She asserted she was—and would always be—a French, not an English, artist. Indeed, she speaks English with a noticeable Quebec French accent to this day. Apart from her commercial success, there were also changes in her personal life, as Angélil, who was 26 years her senior, transitioned from manager to lover. However, the relationship was kept a secret as they both feared the public would find it inappropriate.

=== 1993–1995: The Colour of My Love and D'eux ===
In 1993, Dion announced her feelings for her manager by declaring him "the colour of [her] love" in the dedication section of her third English-language album The Colour of My Love. However, instead of criticizing their relationship as she had feared, fans embraced the couple. Eventually, Angélil and Dion married in an extravagant wedding ceremony on 17 December 1994, which was broadcast live on Canadian television.

As with most of her catalogue, The Colour of My Love had overarching themes of love and romance. It became her most successful record up to point, selling more than six million copies in the US, two million in Canada, and peaking at No. 1 in many countries. The album also spawned Dion's first US, Canadian, and Australian No. 1 single "The Power of Love" (a remake of Jennifer Rush's 1985 hit), which would become her signature hit in various nations until she reached new career heights in the late 1990s.

The single "When I Fall in Love", a duet with Clive Griffin, achieved moderate success on the U.S. and Canadian charts and was nominated for two Grammy Awards, winning one. The Colour of My Love also became Dion's first major hit in Europe, particularly in the United Kingdom. Both the album and the single "Think Twice" simultaneously occupied the top of the British charts for five consecutive weeks. "Think Twice" spent seven weeks at No. 1, becoming the fourth single by a female artist to sell over one million copies in the UK, while its parent album was certified five-times platinum for two million copies sold.

Dion kept to her French roots and continued to release many Francophone recordings between each English record. Generally, they achieved more credibility than her English-language works. She released À l'Olympia, a live album recorded during one of her concerts at the Paris Olympia in 1994. It had one promotional single, a live version of "Calling You", which peaked at seventy-five on the French Singles Chart. She also recorded a bilingual version of "Petit Papa Noël" with Alvin and the Chipmunks for the 1994 holiday album A Very Merry Chipmunk. D'eux (also known as The French Album in the United States), was released in 1995, and it would go on to become the best-selling French-language album. The album was mostly written and produced by Jean-Jacques Goldman, and amassed huge success with the singles "Pour que tu m'aimes encore" and "Je sais pas". "Pour que tu m'aimes encore" reached No. 1 in France and stayed at the top position for twelve weeks. It was later certified Platinum in France. The single reached the top ten in the UK and Ireland, a rare accomplishment for a French song. "Je sais pas", the second single off the album, reached No. 1 on the French Singles Chart as well and was certified Silver there.

During the mid-1990s and onward, Dion's albums were generally constructed on the basis of melodramatic soft rock ballads, with sprinklings of up-tempo pop and rare forays into other genres. She collaborated with writers and producers such as Jim Steinman and David Foster, who helped her to develop a signature sound. While critical reviews fluctuated, her releases performed increasingly well on the international charts, and in 1996, she won the World Music Award for "World's Best-selling Female Recording Artist of the Year" for the third time. By the mid-1990s, she had established herself as one of the best-selling artists in the world.

=== 1996–1999: Falling into You, Let's Talk About Love, and S'il suffisait d'aimer ===
In the five years since her debut English language album in 1990, Billboard stated she had already sold 40 million albums worldwide. Falling into You (1996), Dion's fourth English-language album, presented Dion at the height of her popularity and showed a further progression of her music. In an attempt to reach a wider audience, the album combined many elements, such as complex orchestral sounds, African chanting, and elaborate musical effects. Additionally, instruments like the violin, Spanish guitar, trombone, the cavaquinho, and saxophone created a new sound. The singles encompassed a variety of musical styles. The title track "Falling into You" and "River Deep – Mountain High" (a Tina Turner cover) made prominent use of percussion instruments; "It's All Coming Back to Me Now" (produced by its writer, Jim Steinman) and a remake of Eric Carmen's "All by Myself" maintained a soft-rock atmosphere, combined with the classical sound of the piano; and the No. 1 single "Because You Loved Me", which was written by Diane Warren, was a pop ballad served as the theme to the 1996 film Up Close and Personal.

Falling into You garnered career-best reviews for Dion. While Dan Leroy wrote it was not very different from her previous work with Stephen Holden of The New York Times and Natalie Nichols of the Los Angeles Times writing the album was "formulaic", other critics, such as Chuck Eddy of Entertainment Weekly, Stephen Thomas Erlewine, and Daniel Durchholz, lavished the album as "compelling", "passionate", "stylish", "elegant", and "remarkably well-crafted". Falling into You became Dion's most critically and commercially successful album, topping the charts in many countries and becoming one of the best-selling albums.

In 2013, CBC Music ranked Falling into You 33rd in their list of the 100 greatest Canadian albums ever. In the United States, the album reached No. 1, and was later certified 12× Platinum for over 12 million copies shipped. In Canada, the album was certified diamond for over one million copies shipped. The IFPI certified Falling into You 9× Platinum, an accolade has been given to only two other albums, with one of the two being Dion's own album, Let's Talk About Love. The album also won Grammy Awards for Best Pop Album and the academy's highest honour, Album of the Year. In March 1996, she launched the Falling into You Tour in support of her new album, performing concerts around the world for over a year. In July 1996, she performed "The Power of the Dream" at the 1996 Summer Olympics opening ceremony.

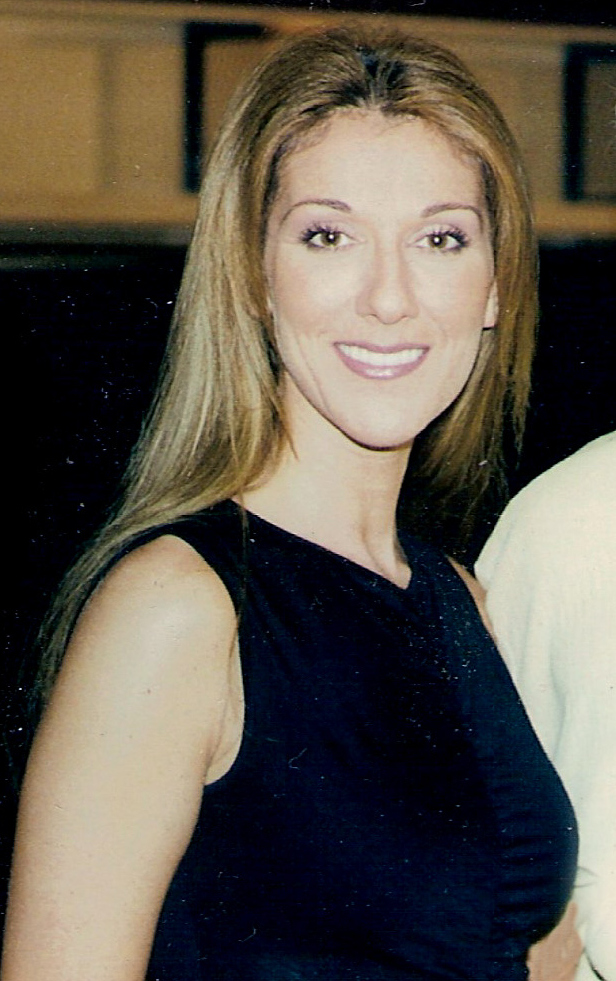
Dion during the promotion of Let's Talk About Love, 1998

She followed Falling into You with Let's Talk About Love (1997), which was publicized as its sequel. The recording process took place in London, New York City, and Los Angeles, and featured a host of special guests, such as Barbra Streisand on "Tell Him"; the Bee Gees on "Immortality"; and tenor Luciano Pavarotti on "I Hate You Then I Love You". Other musicians included Carole King, George Martin, Bryan Adams and Jamaican singer Diana King, who added a reggae tinge to "Treat Her Like a Lady".

Let's Talk About Love was another major success, reaching No. 1 all over the world, attaining platinum status in twenty-four sales territories, and becoming the fastest selling album of her career. In the United States, the album topped the chart in its seventh week of release, and was later certified 11× Platinum in the U.S. for over 11 million copies shipped. In Canada, the album sold 230,212 copies in its first week of release, which remains a record. It was eventually certified diamond in Canada for over one million copies shipped. The most successful single from the album was the classically influenced ballad "My Heart Will Go On", which was written and composed by James Horner and Will Jennings, and produced by Horner and Walter Afanasieff.

Serving as the love theme for the 1997 blockbuster film Titanic, the song topped the charts across the world and became Dion's signature song. Horner and Jennings won the Academy Award and Golden Globe for Best Original Song, while Dion herself garnered two Grammy Awards for Best Female Pop Vocal Performance and the most coveted, Record of the Year, (the song itself won four awards, but two were presented to the songwriters). "My Heart Will Go On" and "Think Twice" made her the only female artist in the UK to have two singles to sell more than a million copies. In support of her album, she embarked on the Let's Talk About Love Tour between 1998 and 1999.

Dion ended the 1990s with three more extremely successful albums: the Christmas album These Are Special Times (1998), the French-language album, S'il suffisait d'aimer, and the compilation album All the Way... A Decade of Song (1999). On These Are Special Times, she co-wrote the song "Don't Save It All for Christmas Day" along with Ric Wake and Peter Zizzo. The album was her most classically influenced yet, with orchestral arrangements found on virtually every track. The album featured the single "I'm Your Angel" (a duet with R. Kelly), which became her fourth US No. 1 single, and a smash hit across the world. The album's second single "The Prayer" (a duet with Andrea Bocelli) served as the soundtrack of the 1998 film Quest for Camelot and won a Golden Globe Award for Best Original Song. All the Way... A Decade of Song drew together her most successful hits coupled with seven new songs, including the lead-off single "That's the Way It Is", a cover of Roberta Flack's "The First Time Ever I Saw Your Face", and "All the Way", a duet with Frank Sinatra. All the Way became one of the best-selling compilation albums, reaching No. 1 in the United States for three weeks. The album was later certified 7× Platinum in the U.S. for 7 million copies shipped. It also topped the charts in the UK, Canada, and Australia. Her last French-language studio album of the 1990s, S'il suffisait d'aimer, was very successful as well, topping the charts in every major French-speaking country, including France, Switzerland, the Wallonia region of Belgium, and Canada. In France, the album was certified diamond, selling 1.5 million copies. By the end of the 1990s, Dion had sold more than 130 million records worldwide, and had won a slew of industry awards. Her status as one of the music industry's biggest pop divas was further solidified when she was asked to perform on VH1's Divas Live special in 1998, with superstars Aretha Franklin, Gloria Estefan, Shania Twain, and Mariah Carey. That year, she also received two of the highest Canadian honours: "Officer of the Order of Canada for Outstanding Contribution to the World of Contemporary Music" and "Officer of the National Order of Quebec". A year later, she was inducted into the Canadian Broadcast Hall of Fame, and was honoured with a star on Canada's Walk of Fame.

Starting from the mid-1990s, the pop rock influence more noticeable in her earlier releases was replaced by a more mature feel. Additionally, the recurring theme of "love" dominated most of her releases, which led to some critics dismissing her music as banal. Other critics, like Elysa Gardner and Jose F. Promis, praised her voice during this period, describing it as a "technical marvel". Steve Dollar, in his review of These Are Special Times, opined Dion was a "vocal Olympian for whom there ain't no mountain—or scale—high enough".

=== 2000–2003: Hiatus, A New Day Has Come, One Heart, and 1 fille & 4 types ===
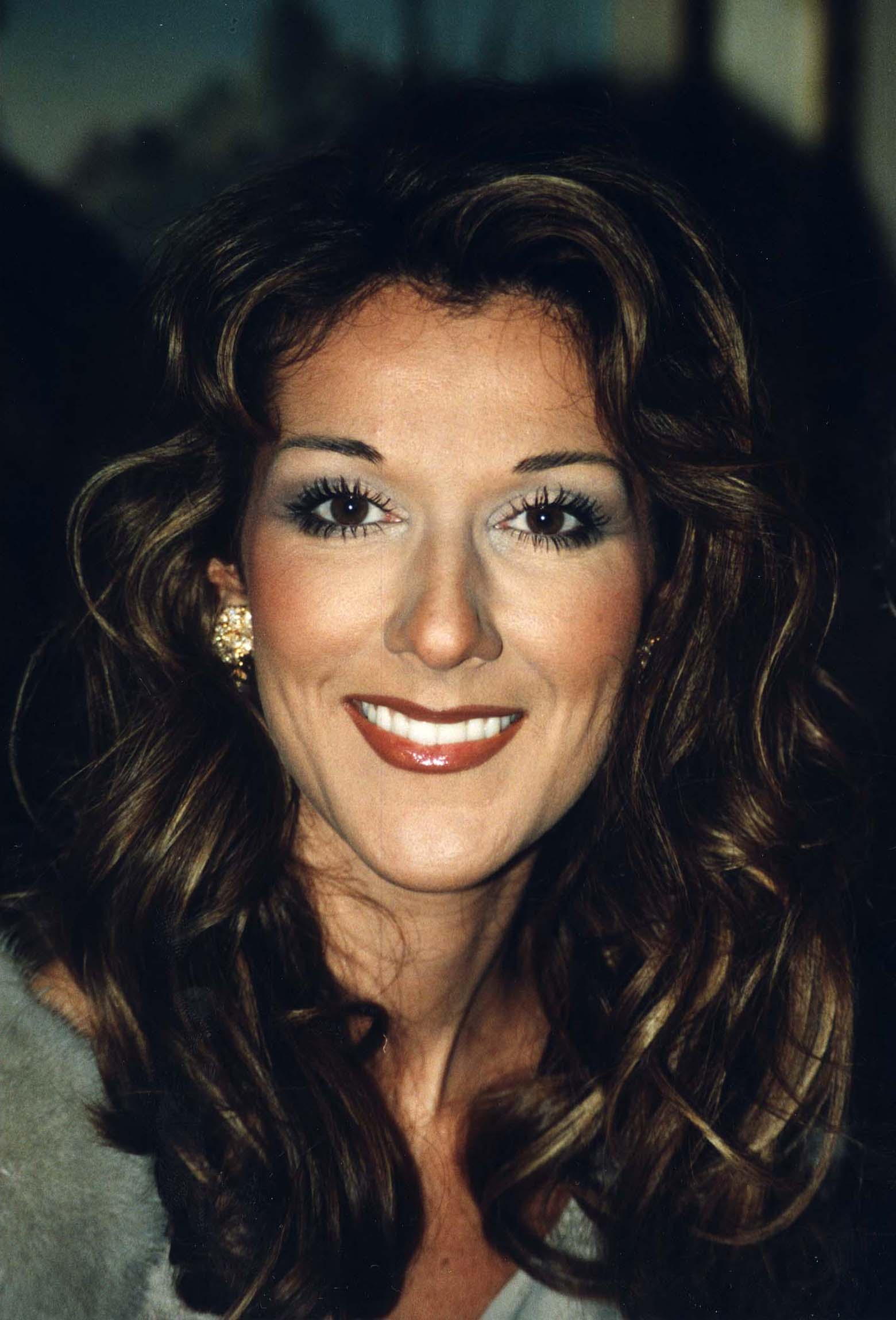
Dion in November 1998

After releasing and promoting thirteen albums during the 1990s, Dion stated she needed to settle down, and announced on her latest album All the Way... A Decade of Song, she needed to take a step back from the spotlight and enjoy life. Angélil's diagnosis with esophageal cancer also prompted her to hiatus. While on break, she was unable to escape the spotlight. In 2000, the National Enquirer published a false story about Dion. Brandishing a picture of Dion and her husband, the magazine misquoted her, printing the headline, "Celine — 'I'm Pregnant With Twins!'" She sued the magazine for more than $20 million. The editors printed an apology and a full retraction in the next issue, and donated money to the American Cancer Society in honour of her and her husband. A year after the incident, after undergoing fertility treatments, she gave birth to a son, René-Charles Dion Angélil, on 25 January 2001, in Florida.

Following the 11 September attacks, Dion returned to the music scene, and in a televised performance sang "God Bless America" at the benefit concert America: A Tribute to Heroes. Chuck Taylor of Billboard wrote, "the performance ... brings to mind what has made her one of the celebrated vocalists of our time: the ability to render emotion that shakes the soul. Affecting, meaningful, and filled with grace, this is a musical reflection to share with all of us still searching for ways to cope." She performed it again in 2003 during pregame festivities for Super Bowl XXXVII in Qualcomm Stadium. In December 2001, she published her autobiography, My Story, My Dream, which chronicled her rags-to-riches story.

Dion ended her three-year sabbatical from the music industry with the aptly titled album A New Day Has Come, released in March 2002. The album was her most personal yet, with songs focusing on her motherhood and maturation as a woman such as "A New Day Has Come", and "Goodbye's (The Saddest Word)". She stated: "Becoming a mother makes you a grown-up." She also stated: "A New Day Has Come, for Rene, for me, is the baby. It has everything to do with the baby ... The song "A New Day Has Come" represents very well the mood I'm feeling right now. It represents the whole album." A New Day Has Come debuted at No. 1 in more than 17 countries, including the United Kingdom and Canada. In the United States, the album debuted at No. 1 on the Billboard 200, with first-week sales of 527,000 copies; marking her first No. 1 debut on the chart, as well as the highest debut sales week of her career in the U.S. It was eventually certified 3× Platinum in the United States, and 6× Platinum in Canada.

While the album was commercially successful, critical reviews suggested it was "forgettable" and the lyrics were "lifeless". Both Rob Sheffield of Rolling Stone, and Ken Tucker of Entertainment Weekly, stated Dion's music had not developed much during her break, and classed her material as trite and mediocre. Sal Cinquemani of Slant Magazine called the album "a lengthy collection of drippy, gooey pop fluffer-nutter". The first single off the album, A New Day Has Come peaked at No.22 on the Billboard Hot 100 charts, being an airplay-only release. On the Hot Adult Contemporary Tracks, however, the song spent 21 consecutive weeks at No. 1, breaking the record for the longest span at the top. The previous record holders were Phil Collins' You'll Be in My Heart and Dion's own Because You Loved Me, both of which lasted nineteen weeks at No. 1. The album's next single, "I'm Alive", was featured on the soundtrack for Stuart Little 2 (2002), and was ranked number 2 on the European Hot 100 Singles, and number 6 on the Hot Adult Contemporary Tracks in the United States. During 2002, she performed for many benefit concerts, including her second appearance on VH1 Divas Live, a concert to benefit the VH1 Save The Music Foundation, alongside Cher, Anastacia, Dixie Chicks, Mary J. Blige, Whitney Houston, Cyndi Lauper, Shakira, and Stevie Nicks.

In conjunction with an endorsement deal with Chrysler, she released One Heart (2003), an album representing her appreciation for life. The album largely consisted of pop and dance music—a deviation from the soaring, melodramatic ballads, for which she had been known. Although the album achieved moderate success, One Heart was met with mixed criticism, and words such as "predictable" and "banal" appeared even in the most lenient reviews. A cover of the 1989 Cyndi Lauper hit "I Drove All Night", released to launch her advertising campaign with Chrysler, incorporated elements of dance-pop and rock and roll. The advertising deal was met with criticism, with some stating Dion was trying to cater to her sponsors.

After One Heart, she released her next English-language studio album, Miracle (2004). Miracle was a multimedia project conceived by Dion and Australian photographer Anne Geddes and had a theme centring on babies and motherhood. The album was filled with lullabies and other songs of maternal love and inspiration, including covers of Louis Armstrong's "What a Wonderful World" and John Lennon's "Beautiful Boy". The reviews for Miracle were mixed. Stephen Thomas Erlewine gave the album three of out five stars, stating, "The worst you can say about the record is that there are no surprises, but the audience for this record doesn't want surprises; they want comfort, whether it arrives in polished music or artsy photos of newborns, and Miracle provides both, which makes it appealing for those expectant or new mothers in Dion's audience." Chuck Taylor of Billboard wrote the single "Beautiful Boy" was "an unexpected gem" and called Dion "a timeless, enormously versatile artist", Chuck Arnold of People, however, labelled the album as excessively sentimental, while Nancy Miller of Entertainment Weekly opined that "the whole earth-mama act is just opportunism, reborn". Miracle debuted at No. 4 on the Billboard 200 chart and No. 1 in Canada and was eventually certified platinum by the RIAA.

The francophone album 1 fille & 4 types (1 Girl & 4 Guys), released in October 2003, fared better than her previous two releases and showed her trying to distance herself from the "diva" image. She recruited Jean-Jacques Goldman, Gildas Arzel, Eric Benzi, and Jacques Veneruso, with whom she had previously worked on two of her best-selling French albums S'il suffisait d'aimer and D'eux. Labeled "the album of pleasure" by Dion herself, the album cover showed her in a simple and relaxed manner, contrary to the choreographed poses usually found on her album covers. The album achieved widespread commercial success in France, Canada, and Belgium where it reached No. 1. In France, the album debuted at No. 1 and was later certified 2× platinum after selling over 700,000 copies. Stephen Thomas Erlewine wrote Dion's vocals were "back at top of their game" and she was "getting back to pop basics and performing at a level unheard in a while".

Though her albums were commercially successful, they did not achieve the sales or the reception of her previous works. Her songs received less airplay as radio became less embracing of balladeers like Dion, Carey, and Houston, and was focused on more up-tempo, urban/hip-hop songs. By 2004, Dion had accumulated sales of more than 175 million albums worldwide and received the Chopard Diamond Award from the World Music Awards for her achievements. According to the official World Music Awards website, the award is rare; it is "not presented every year" and an artist can be presented with the award only for selling "over 100 million albums during their career".

=== 2003–2007: A New Day... residency ===
In early 2002, Dion announced a three-year, 600-show contract to appear five nights a week in an entertainment extravaganza, A New Day..., at the Colosseum at Caesars Palace. This move was generally seen as risky, but journalist Miriam Nunzio wrote it was "one of the smartest business decisions in years by any major recording artist". Dion conceived the show after seeing O by Franco Dragone during her break from recording, and it premiered on 25 March 2003, in a 4,000-seat arena specifically designed for her show and modelled after the Roman Colosseum. Many stars attended the opening night including Dick Clark, Alan Thicke, Kathy Griffin, Lance Bass, and Justin Timberlake, who hosted the television special. The show, directed by Dragone and choreographed by Mia Michaels, was a combination of dance, music, and visual effects. It included Dion performing her biggest hits against an array of dancers and special effects. Reviewer Mike Weatherford felt that, at first, Dion was not as relaxed as she should be, and at times, it was hard to find her among the excessive stage ornamentation and dancers. However, he noted the show had become more enjoyable over the course of its run, because of her improved stage-presence and simplified costumes.

The show was well received by audiences; it routinely sold out until its end in late 2007. Ticket prices averaged US $135.33. According to Pollstar, Dion sold 322,000 tickets and grossed US $43.9 million in the first half of 2005, and by July 2005, she had sold out 315 out of 384 shows. By the end of 2005, she grossed more than US $76 million, placing sixth on Billboard's Money Makers list for 2005. Because of the show's success, her contract was extended into 2007 for an undisclosed sum. On 5 January 2007, it was announced the show would end on 15 December 2007, with tickets for the period after October 2007 having gone on sale from 1 March. According to Billboard, A New Day... is the most successful residency, grossing over US$385 million ($597.8 million in 2025 dollars) and drawing nearly three million people to 717 shows. The Live in Las Vegas: A New Day... DVD was released on 10 December 2007, in Europe and the following day in North America.

=== 2007–2010: D'elles, Taking Chances, and Taking Chances Tour ===
On 21 May 2007, Dion released the French-language album D'elles (About Them), which debuted at the top of the Canadian album charts, selling 72,200 copies in its first week. It marked her tenth No. 1 album in the SoundScan era, and her eighth debut at the top position. In Canada, the album has been certified 2× platinum, and within the first month had already shipped half a million units worldwide. D'Elles also reached No. 1 in France and Belgium. The first single "Et s'il n'en restait qu'une (je serais celle-là)" (meaning "And If There Were Only One Woman Left, (I Would Be That One)") debuted at the top of the French singles chart a month earlier. Later in same year, she released the English album Taking Chances on 12 November in Europe, and 13 November in North America. Her first English studio album since 2003's One Heart, it featured pop, R&B, and rock inspired music. For this album, she collaborated with John Shanks and ex-Evanescence guitarist Ben Moody, as well as Kristian Lundin, Peer Åström, Linda Perry, Japanese singer Yuna Ito, and R&B singer and songwriter Ne-Yo. Dion stated, "I think this album represents a positive evolution in my career ... I'm feeling strong, maybe a little gutsier than in the past, and just as passionate about music and life as I ever was." She launched her year-long global Taking Chances Tour on 14 February 2008 in South Africa, performing 132 dates in stadiums and arenas across 5 continents.

The Taking Chances Tour was a great success in the United States, reaching the No. 1 spot on the Billboard Boxscore, having sold out every concert in the U.S. and Canada. In addition, she appeared on Idol Gives Back for a second year in a row. Dion was nominated for six Juno Awards in 2008, adding to her 53 previous nominations (an all-time record). Her nominations included Artist of the Year, Pop Album of the Year (for Taking Chances), Francophone Album of the Year (for D'elles) and Album of the Year (for both Taking Chances and D'elles). The following year, she was nominated for 3 Juno Awards including the Fan Choice Award, Song of the Year (for "Taking Chances"), and Music DVD of the Year (for Live in Las Vegas: A New Day...)

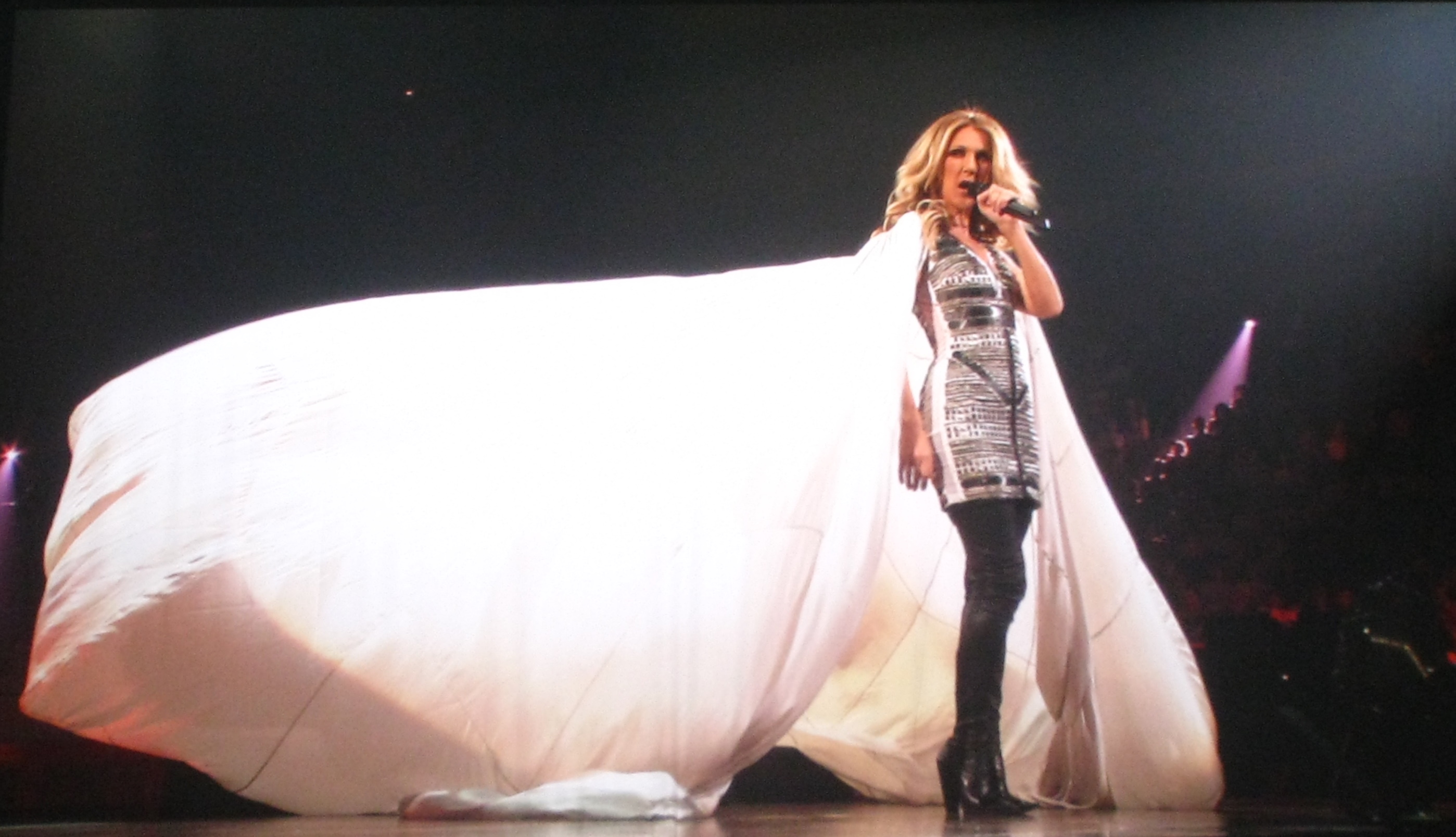
Dion on stage performing "Eyes on Me" during her Taking Chances Tour in Montreal in August 2008

On 22 August 2008, Dion presented a free outdoor concert, mostly in French, on the Plains of Abraham, for the 400th anniversary of Quebec City. The celebration gathered approximately 490,000 people. The concert, called Céline sur les Plaines, was released on DVD on 11 November 2008, in Quebec and was released on 20 May 2009, in France. Late October 2008 saw the worldwide release of a comprehensive English-language greatest hits album, My Love: Essential Collection.

In May 2009, Dion was named the 20th best-selling artist of the decade and the second-best-selling female artist of the decade in the United States, selling an estimated 17.57 million copies of her albums there since 2000. In June 2009, Forbes reported she earned $100 million during 2008. In December 2009, Pollstar announced she was the highest-grossing solo live music act in North America of the decade, second overall behind only the Dave Matthews Band. She grossed $522.2 million during the decade, a large portion of the sum coming from her five-year residency at Caesars Palace.

In January 2010, the Los Angeles Times presented its annual list of the top ten largest earners of the year, revealing Dion took the top spot for the entire decade, with $747.9 million in total revenue from 2000 to 2009. The largest haul came from ticket sales, totalling $522.2 million. Additionally, she was named "Artist of the Decade" in Quebec, announced by Le Journal de Québec in December 2009. A public online survey asked responders to vote for whom they believe deserved the above-mentioned accolade.

On 17 February 2010, Dion released into theatres a documentary film about her Taking Chances Tour, titled, Celine: Through the Eyes of the World. The documentary shows behind-the-scenes footage of her both onstage and offstage, along with footage of her with her family as they travelled the world with her. The distributor is the Sony Pictures subsidiary, Hot Ticket. The film was later released on Blu-ray and DVD on 4 May 2010, along with the CD/DVD, Taking Chances World Tour: The Concert. At the 52nd Grammy Awards in February 2010, Dion joined Carrie Underwood, Usher, Jennifer Hudson, and Smokey Robinson to perform the song "Earth Song" during the 3-D Michael Jackson tribute.

Furthermore, in a May 2010 Harris Poll, Dion was named the most popular musician in the United States, ahead of U2, Elvis Presley, and The Beatles while factoring in gender, political affiliations, geographic region of residence, and income. Specifically, she was the most popular musician in the female demographic, as well as among all Democrats, those who live in the eastern United States and southern United States, and those who have incomes between US$35k and US$74.9k. In September 2010, she released the single "Voler", a duet with French singer Michel Sardou. The song was later included on Sardou's album. In addition, it was announced in October 2010 that Dion wrote and composed a new song for Canadian singer Marc Dupré; this song is entitled "Entre deux mondes".

=== 2011–2014: Celine, Sans attendre, and Loved Me Back to Life ===
In an interview with People published in February 2010, Dion announced she would be returning to Caesars Palace for Celine, a three-year residency for seventy shows a year, beginning 15 March 2011. She stated the show will feature, "all the songs from my repertoire people want to hear" and will contain a selection of music from classic Hollywood films. To promote her return to Las Vegas, Dion made an appearance on The Oprah Winfrey Show on 21 February, during the show's final season, marking her record twenty-seventh appearance. In 2018, Billboard stated her residency Celine is the second most successful residency. By the end of 2011, Dion has sold 331,000 albums (despite not releasing any studio album since 2007) and 956,000 digital tracks in the United States.

For a record sixth time, she performed at the 83rd Academy Awards, where she sang the song "Smile", as part of the ceremony's "In Memoriam" segment. On 4 September, she appeared on the 2011 MDA Labor Telethon Event and presented a prerecorded performance of "Open Arms" from her new Las Vegas show. On 1 October 2011, the OWN Network premiered a documentary on Dion's life, detailing the months before, during and after her pregnancy, to the makings of her new Las Vegas Show, called, "Celine: 3 Boys and a New Show". The documentary became the second highest rated show on TV OWN Canada. In October, FlightNetwork.com conducted a poll asking 780 participants which celebrity they would most like to sit next to on an airplane. Dion was the top favourite, with 23.7% of the vote. Also, in September, she released the 14th perfume from her Celine Dion Parfums Collection, called "Signature". On 15 September, she made an appearance at the free concert of Andrea Bocelli in Central Park. In 2012, she performed at the 16th Jazz and Blues Festival in Jamaica.

In October 2012, Sony Music Entertainment released The Best of Celine Dion & David Foster in Asia. She began recording songs for her next English and French albums during April and May 2012. The French-language album, Sans attendre was released on 2 November 2012, and was a smash success in all French-speaking territories, especially in France where it achieved diamond status. The English-language album was postponed to 1 November 2013. Titled Loved Me Back to Life, it included collaborations with an exceptional team of songwriters and producers, including duets with Ne-Yo and Stevie Wonder. The lead single, "Loved Me Back to Life" was released on 3 September 2013. Dion embarked on the Sans attendre Tour in November 2013 and performed in Belgium and France. "Breakaway", "Incredible" and "Water and a Flame" were chosen as next singles. In June 2013, Dion co-produced the show titled "Voices" by Véronic DiCaire at Bally's Hotel & Casino's Jubilee Theatre and was presented 145 times up until 2015.

=== 2014–2021: Husband's death, Encore un soir, Courage, and return to Vegas ===
On 13 August 2014, Dion announced the indefinite postponement of all her show business activities, including her concert residency at Caesars Palace, and the cancellation of her Asia Tour, because of the worsening of her husband's health after he underwent the removal of a cancerous tumor in December 2013. However, on 20 March 2015, she announced she would be returning to the Colosseum at Caesars Palace in late August 2015. On 14 January 2016, she cancelled the rest of the January performances due to her husband's and her brother's deaths from cancer. Dion resumed the residency on 23 February to a sold-out crowd and rave reviews.

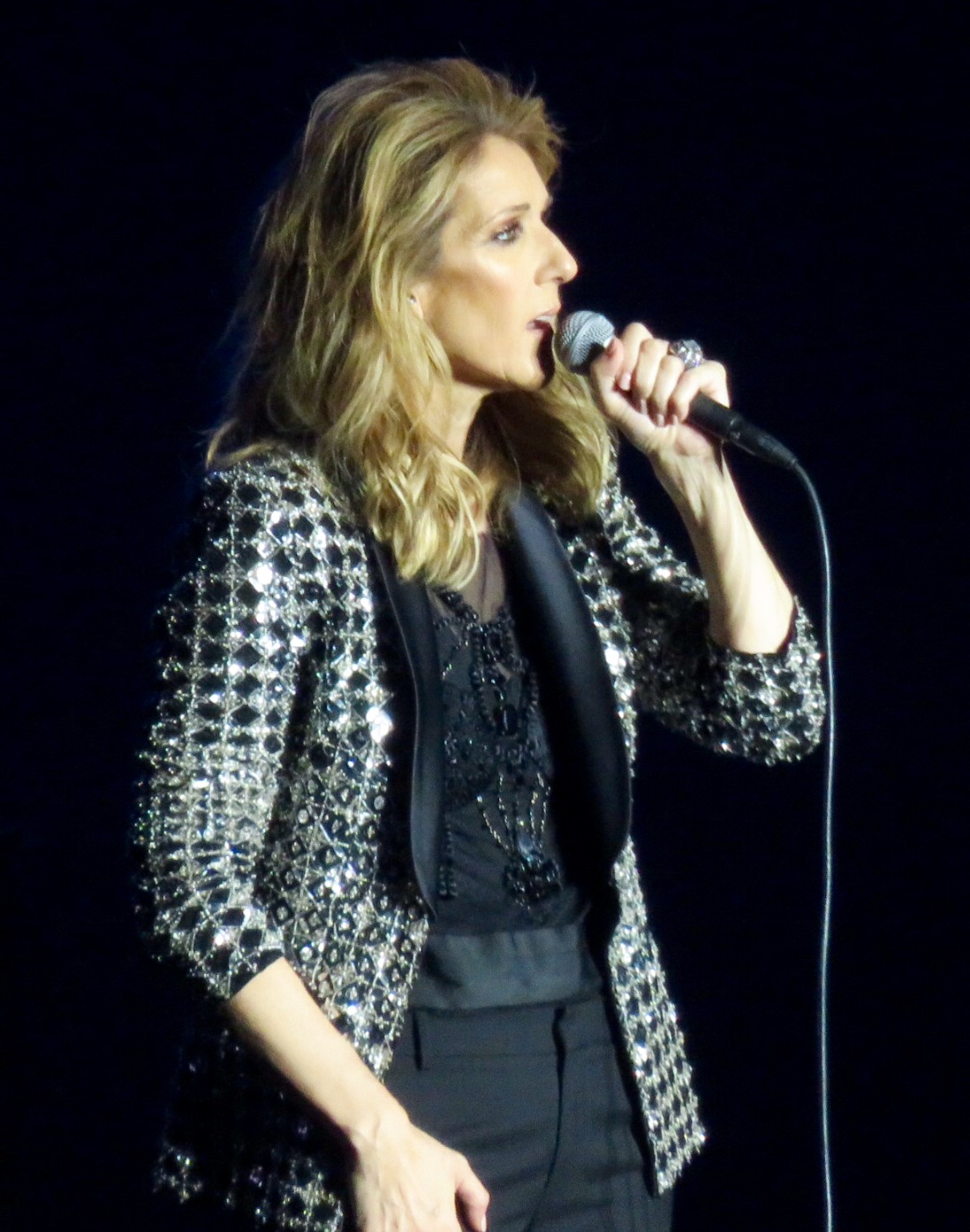
Dion performing in Birmingham in 2017

In October 2015, Dion announced on social media she had begun working on a new French album, posting a photo by the side of Algerian singer Zaho. Dion's French single, "Encore un soir", was released on 24 May 2016. On 20 May, she released a cover of Queen's song "The Show Must Go On", featuring Lindsey Stirling on violin. She performed "The Show Must Go On" at the 2016 Billboard Music Awards on 22 May, and received the Billboard Icon Award (presented to her by her son, René-Charles) in recognition of her career spanning over three decades.

Dion's new French album, Encore un soir, was released on 26 August 2016. It features fifteen tracks performed in French and, according to Dion, has a personal choice of the songs – more uplifting lyrics were chosen. Encore un soir topped the charts in France, Canada, Belgium and Switzerland, and was certified Diamond in France, 2× Platinum in Canada and Platinum in Belgium and Switzerland. It has sold over 1.5 million copies worldwide. In 2016 and 2017, Dion toured Europe and Canada with two sold-out concert tours. On 9 September 2016, she released "Recovering", a song written for her by Pink after Angélil died in January 2016. Dion also recorded "How Does a Moment Last Forever" for the Beauty and the Beast: Original Motion Picture Soundtrack, released in March 2017. Her compilation, Un peu de nous, topped the chart in France in July and August 2017.

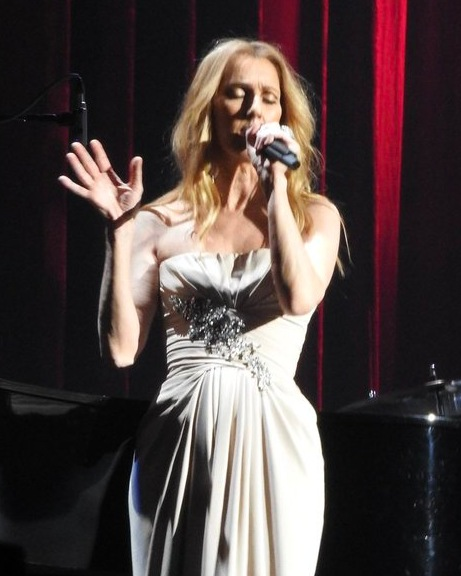
Dion performing in Las Vegas in 2018

On 3 May 2018, she released the single "Ashes" from the film Deadpool 2. The remix version of the song topped the U.S. Dance Club Songs chart in July 2018. From June to August 2018, she toured the Asia-Pacific region and grossed $56.5 million from 22 shows. On 24 September 2018, she announced the end of her Las Vegas residency Celine, with the final date set for 8 June 2019. She then started working on a new English album. In January 2019, she performed "A Change Is Gonna Come" at Aretha Franklin's tribute concert, 'Aretha! A Grammy Celebration for the Queen of Soul', which was broadcast in March 2019. Also in March 2019, she was one of 11 singers from Quebec, alongside Ginette Reno, Diane Dufresne, Isabelle Boulay, Luce Dufault, Louise Forestier, Laurence Jalbert, Catherine Major, Ariane Moffatt, Marie Denise Pelletier, and Marie-Élaine Thibert, who participated in a supergroup recording of Renée Claude's 1971 single "Tu trouveras la paix" after Claude's diagnosis with Alzheimer's disease was announced.

On 3 April 2019, during a Facebook Live event, Dion announced her 2019/2020 Courage World Tour, beginning in Quebec City on 18 September 2019. She also announced a new English-language album of the same name, released in November 2019. Courage debuted at number one on the US Billboard 200 dated 30 November 2019, earning Dion her first US number-one album in 17 years, having last topped the chart with A New Day Has Come (2002). It is her fifth US number-one album, and earned 113,000 album-equivalent units, including 109,000 pure album sales. It also became her 13th top-ten album on the Billboard 200. Thanks to Courage, Dion has collected number-one albums in each of the last three decades, being the fourth woman to achieve the feat after Janet Jackson, Barbra Streisand and Britney Spears. The album also debuted at number one in Canada, becoming Dion's 15th number-one album in the Nielsen SoundScan era and 16th overall in the country.

On 18 September 2019, Dion released three songs, "Lying Down", "Courage", and "Imperfections" from her upcoming album, Courage. On 26 February 2020, Dion released two songs as exclusive Spotify singles: an acoustic version of Imperfections, and a cover of Chris Isaak's "Wicked Game". Isaak joined Dion and sang vocals on the track. On 10 June 2020, Dion announced her Courage World Tour will kick off again in 2021, after the tour was postponed due to the COVID-19 pandemic. On 21 May 2021, it was announced Dion would return to Las Vegas, in November of the same year, for a limited-run installment of ten dates in collaboration with Resorts World Las Vegas. Billboard listed Dion as the third top paid musician of 2020 (second by female artist), with total of earnings of $17.5 million. Dion contributed vocals to the song "Superwoman" on Diane Warren's 2021 album Diane Warren: The Cave Sessions Vol. 1.

=== 2022–present: Illness, acting debut and Paris Olympics ===
On 15 January 2022, Dion canceled her North American tour dates because of severe muscle spasms. On 8 December, she announced she had been diagnosed with stiff-person syndrome, a rare neurological disease. She said the disease affected every aspect of her life, making it difficult to walk, and affected her vocal cords. All her tour dates were cancelled.

In 2023, Dion starred as herself in Love Again, her first acting appearance in a feature film. She also recorded five new songs for the soundtrack, released on 12 May; the first single, "Love Again", premiered on 13 April. On 3 May 2024, a mashup of Dion's "I'm Alive" and the Whispers' 1979 song "And the Beat Goes On" was released as a single. "Set My Heart on Fire (I'm Alive x And the Beat Goes On)", by Majestic and the Jammin Kid, also includes Dion as a lead credit. The single debuted at number 6 on the UK Singles Downloads Chart.

On 25 June 2024, Amazon MGM Studios released a documentary about Dion's life with stiff-person syndrome, I Am: Celine Dion. The I Am: Celine Dion soundtrack was released on 21 June. On 26 July, Dion sang "Hymne à l'amour" from the Eiffel Tower to conclude the 2024 Summer Olympics opening ceremony. It was her first public performance in four years. The Guardian wrote that Dion's performance was an "undaunted, beatific return", with "the gusto of someone who, by her own admission, longs to resume touring more than her fans". Sound analysis indicated that Dion had mimed to a prerecorded pitch-corrected vocal, which was denied by the ceremony's musical director. On 13 November, Dion walked the runway at the 1000 Seasons of Elie Saab fashion show in Riyadh, Saudi Arabia, where she performed "I'm Alive" and "The Power of Love".

On 13 May 2025, Dion appeared in a video message during the first semifinal of the Eurovision Song Contest 2025 in Basel, Switzerland, before a tribute performance of her Eurovision-winning song "Ne partez pas sans moi" by former Eurovision entrants. Dion canceled a planned guest performance in that year's Eurovision final due to her illness. On 25 July, the Swedish DJ and producer Sebastian Ingrosso released the single "A New Day", with Dion, a remix of her 2002 single "A New Day Has Come".

On 30 March 2026, Dion announced a concert residency at La Défense Arena, which was later renamed Plenitude Arena. It initially comprised 16 shows between 12 September and 17 October 2026, but that number was later expanded after Dion announced 16 additional dates scheduled to last until May 2027 in response to overwhelming demand. More than nine million fans entered a lottery for early access to tickets, and all dates sold out within hours. On 17 April 2026, Dion released "Dansons", written by Jean-Jacques Goldman, her first original French song in a decade and her first recording following her diagnosis. On 3 July 2026, she issued another original French single, "Bonjour, pardon, merci", written by Ycare and Renaud Rebillaud, marking her second new release of the year and accompanying the residency.

== Artistry ==
=== Influences ===
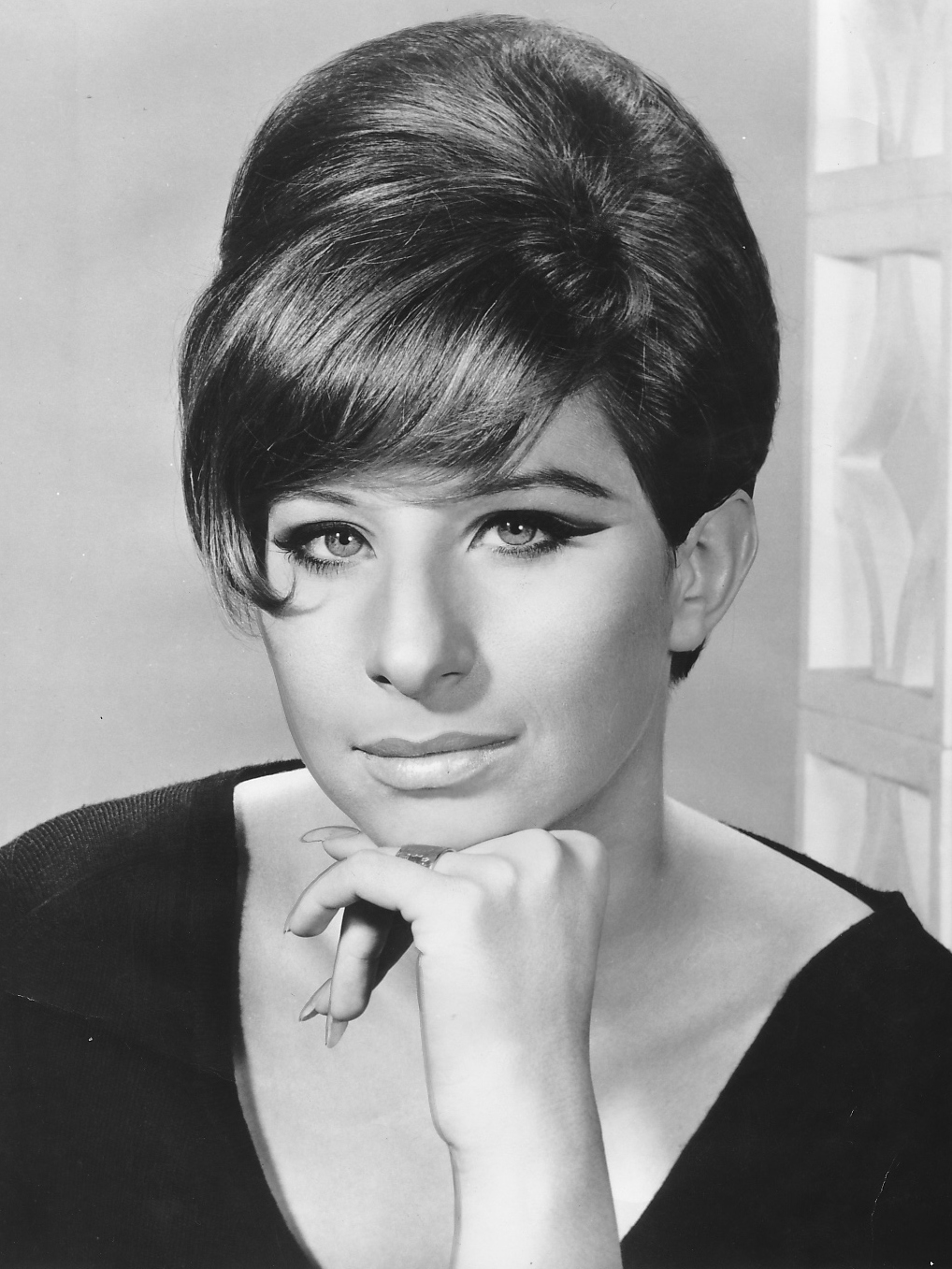
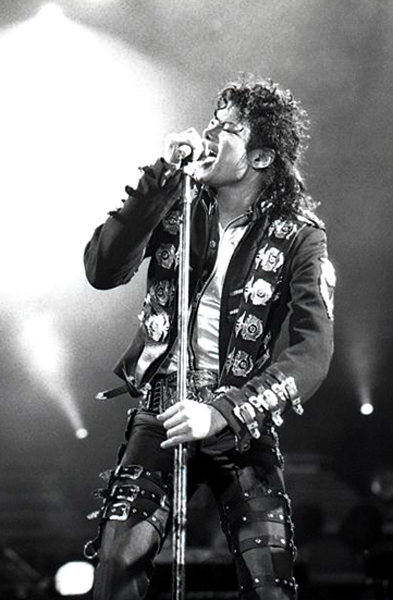
Singers such as Barbra Streisand (left) and Michael Jackson (right) have influenced Dion. Jackson was a major motivation for her to learn English

Dion cites idols as varied as Michael Jackson, Aretha Franklin, Charles Aznavour, Carole King, Anne Murray, Barbra Streisand, Whitney Houston and the Bee Gees. She eventually collaborated with most of them. Michael Jackson in particular was a major motivation for her to learn English as early as in the 1980s. Her music has been influenced by numerous genres, including pop, rock, gospel, R&B, and soul, and her lyrics focus on themes of poverty, world hunger, and spirituality, with an emphasis on love and romance. After the birth of her first child, her work increasingly focused on maternal love.

=== Musical style ===
Dion has faced considerable criticism from critics, who state that her music often retreats behind pop and soul conventions, and is marked by excessive sentimentality. According to Keith Harris of Rolling Stone magazine, "[Dion's] sentimentality is bombastic and defiant rather than demure and retiring ... [she] stands at the end of the chain of drastic devolution that goes Aretha–Whitney–Mariah. Far from being an aberration, Dion actually stands as a symbol of a certain kind of pop sensibility—bigger is better, too much is never enough, and the riper the emotion the more true." Her recordings have been mainly in English and French, although she has sung in several other languages also, including Japanese, Italian, German, Mandarin, Spanish, and Neapolitan. Her francophone releases, by contrast, tend to be deeper and more varied than her English releases, and consequently have achieved more credibility.

Critics have stated that Dion's involvement in the production aspect of her music is fundamentally lacking, which results in her work being overproduced and impersonal. However, coming from a family in which all of her siblings were musicians, she dabbled in learning how to play instruments like piano and guitar, and practised with a Fender Stratocaster during the recording sessions for her album Falling into You.

Occasionally, Dion has contributed to the writing of a handful of her English and French songs, as well as writing a few songs for other artists such as Marc Dupré. Additionally, as her career progressed, she found herself taking charge in the production of her albums. On her first English album, which she recorded before she had a firm command of the English language, she expressed disapproval, which could have been avoided if she had assumed more creative input. By the time she released her second English album Celine Dion, she had assumed more control of the production and recording process, hoping to dispel earlier criticisms. She stated, "On the second album I said, 'Well, I have the choice to be afraid one more time and not be 100% happy, or not be afraid and be part of this album.' This is my album." Besides her contributions to some of her early French albums, Dion wrote a few of the songs on Let's Talk About Love (1997) and These Are Special Times (1998). In addition to adult contemporary, her albums A New Day Has Come (2002) and One Heart (2003) notably incorporated elements of dance-pop to a greater extent than her previous releases.

She is often the subject of media ridicule and parody and is frequently impersonated on shows such as MADtv, Saturday Night Live, South Park, Royal Canadian Air Farce, and This Hour Has 22 Minutes for her strong accent and onstage gesticulations. However, she has stated that she is unaffected by the comments, and is flattered that people take the time to impersonate her. She even invited Ana Gasteyer, who parodied her on SNL, to appear onstage during one of her performances in New York City. While she is rarely politically outspoken, in 2005 following the Hurricane Katrina disaster, Dion appeared on Larry King Live and tearfully criticized the US government's slow response in aiding the victims of the hurricane: "There's people still there waiting to be rescued. To me that is not acceptable ... How can it be so easy to send planes in another country to kill everybody in a second and destroy lives. We need to serve our country." After her interview, she stated, "When I do interviews with Larry King or the big TV shows like that, they put you on the spot, which is very difficult. I do have an opinion, but I'm a singer. I'm not a politician."

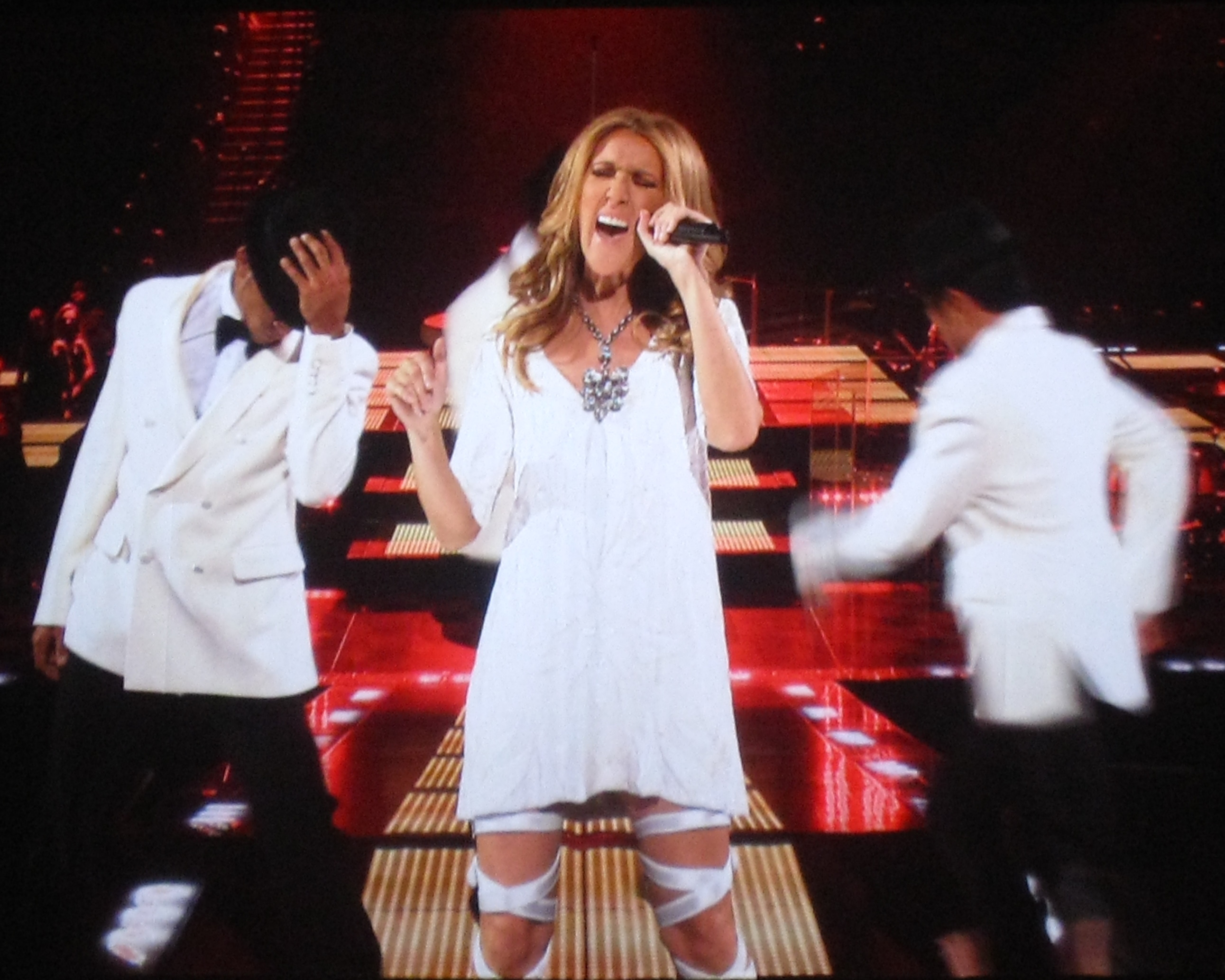
Dion performing at Taking Chances World Tour in 2008

=== Voice and timbre ===
In discussions of opera projects, Dion said she was a mezzo-soprano. However, attempts to adapt classical voice types to other forms of singing have been met with controversy. Kent Nagano, maestro of the Munich Symphony Orchestra, remarked, "All you just sang was soprano", after Dion auditioned with two solos from Carmen, wanting to know if she could sing opera. Her timbre has been described as "thin, slightly nasal" with a "raspy" lower register and "bell glass-like high notes".

According to Linda Lister in Divafication: The Deification of Modern Female Pop Stars, she has been described as a reigning "Queen of Pop" for her influence over the recording industry during the 1990s, alongside other female artists, including Whitney Houston and Mariah Carey. In a countdown of the "22 Greatest Voices in Music" by Blender Magazine and MTV, she placed ninth (sixth for a female), and she was also placed fourth in Cover Magazine's list of "The 100 Outstanding Pop Vocalists". MTV Australia ranked Dion at fourth place in their list of Top 10 music divas. Dion is often compared to Houston and Carey for her vocal style, and to her idol Barbra Streisand for her voice.

She is often praised for her technical virtuosity. Jim Santella of The Buffalo News writes "Like an iron fist in a velvet glove, the power of Celine Dion's voice is cloaked in a silky vibrato that betrays the intensity of her vocal commitment." Jeff Miers, also of The Buffalo News, says of Dion "Her singing voice is absolutely extra-human. She hits notes in full voice, with a controlled vibrato and an incredible conception of pitch, like she's shucking an ear of corn." Stephen Holden of The New York Times states that Dion has "a good-sized arsenal of technical skills. She can deliver tricky melismas, produce expressive vocal catches and sustain long notes without the tiniest wavering of pitch. And as her duets ... have shown, she is a reliable harmony voice." In an interview with Libération, Jean-Jacques Goldman notes that she has "no problem of accuracy or tempo". According to Kent Nagano, she is "a musician who has a good ear, a refinement, and a degree of perfection that is enviable". Charles Alexander of Time states, "[Her] voice glides effortlessly from deep whispers to dead-on high notes, a sweet siren that combines force with grace." Foster, who has worked with Dion several times, considers her practically at the top of his list of favourite singers, noting that her voice has always been capable of achieving exactly what he envisions.

In her French repertoire, Dion adorns her vocals with more nuances and expressiveness, with the emotional intensity being "more tender and intimate". Additionally, Luc Plamondon, a French singer-songwriter who has worked closely with Dion claims that there are three chanteuses (stylistically) that she uses: the Québécois, the French, and the American. Her self-titled 1992 album was promoted with the slogan "Remember the name because you'll never forget the voice."

== Legacy ==
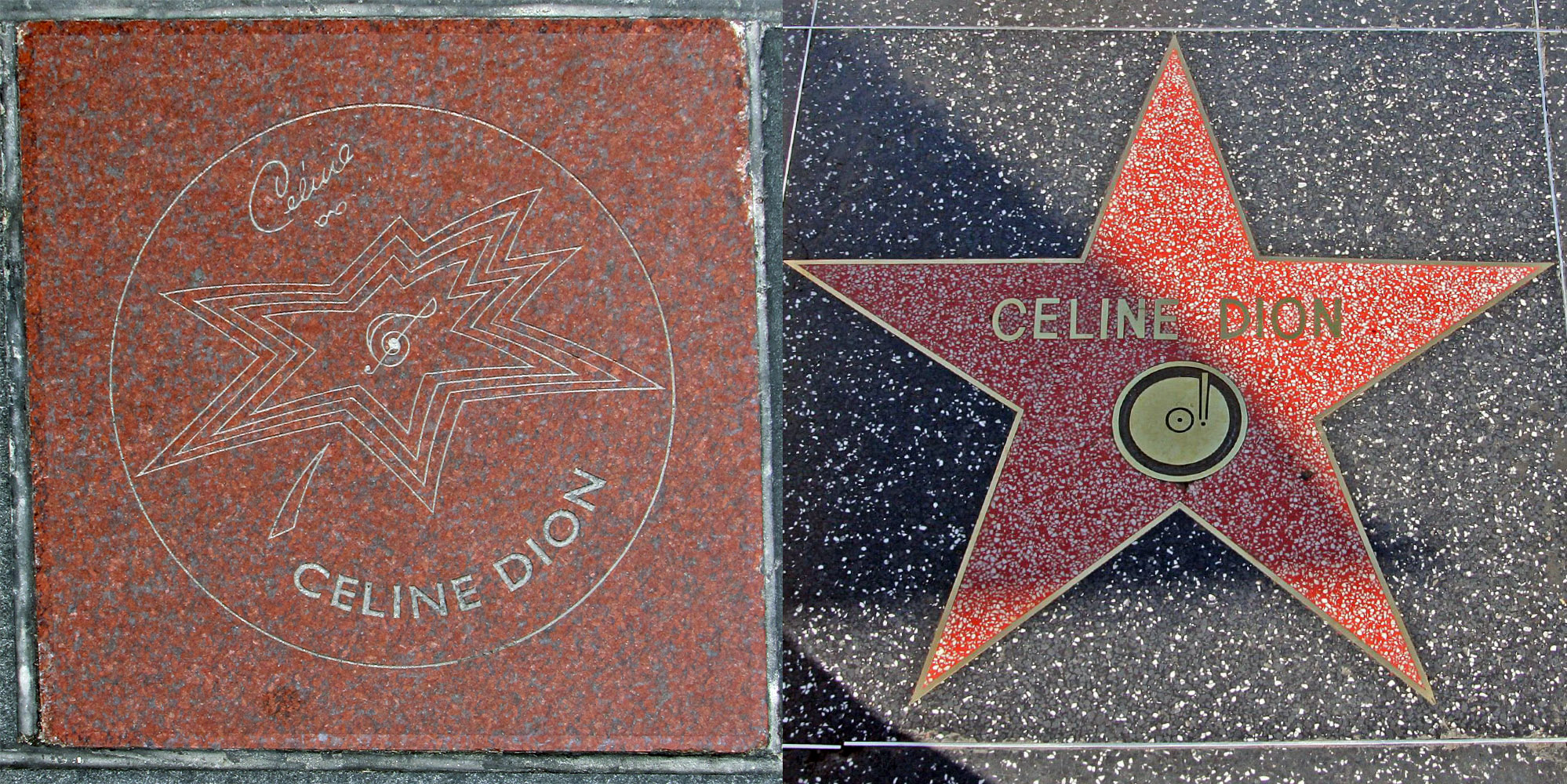
Dion's stars on Canada's Walk of Fame and the Hollywood Walk of Fame

Dion is credited for introducing Francophone music to many non-Francophone countries around the globe. RFI Musique opined that French music "would probably never have got beyond Francophone borders without her" She has also been credited with revitalizing and revolutionizing the entertainment scene in Las Vegas with the gargantuan successes of her residencies there. She signed a $100 million contract for a residency in Vegas, which is considered one of the most lucrative and risky residency contracts in the touring industry. Dion is popularly referred as the reigning "Queen of Las Vegas" by various media outlets for her impact and legacy in the city. Celine Dion has received various acclaims from fashion critics for reinventing her fashion style over the years. Vogue named her as one of music's most exuberant dressers, beloved as much for her glorious voice as her extravagant sense of style. Since her career's inception in 1981, Dion has been cited as an influence by various music artists all over the world, as well as one of the greatest vocalists of all-time. According to producer, musician, and former American Idol judge Randy Jackson, Dion, Whitney Houston, and Mariah Carey are the voices of the modern era.

Dion has been the subject of various tribute projects around the world, including a jukebox musical Titanique, which is a retelling of the events from the 1997 film Titanic from the perspective of Dion, and 2021 musical comedy biopic Aline. Dion has also been the subject of numerous drag queens in their performance, and she has been referenced in music and films. Jazz vocalist Ranee Lee released an album titled Because You Loved Me, covering some of Dion's biggest songs.

== Awards and achievements ==
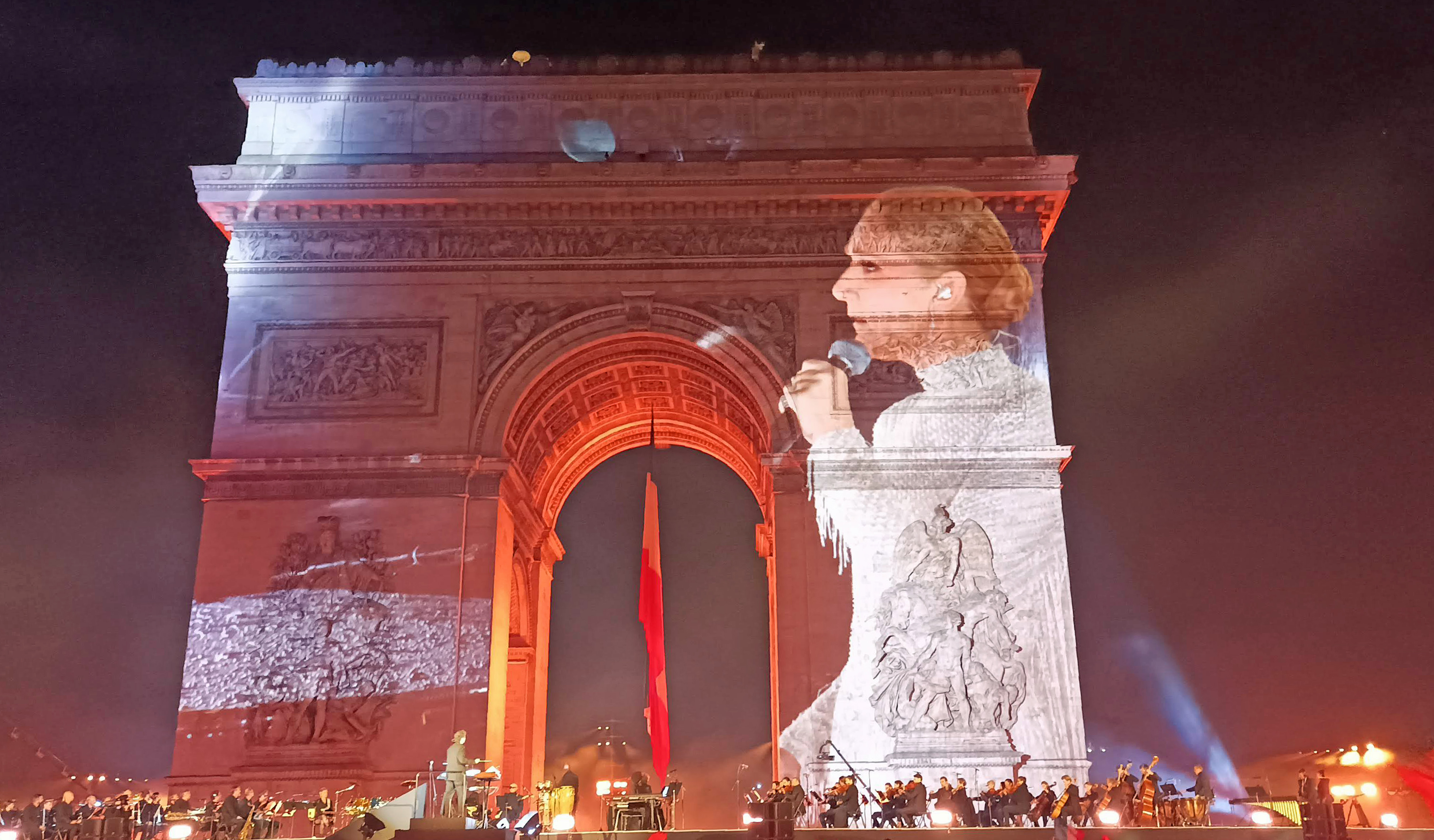
Dion's 2024 Summer Olympics performance projected at the Arc de Triomphe

Dion has received numerous accolades throughout her career. She has won seven American Music Awards, nine Billboard Music Awards, fifty Felix Awards, five Grammy Awards, four Guinness World Records, twenty Juno Awards and twelve World Music Awards. With 75 nominations, she is the most nominated artist in the Juno Awards history and the fourth most awarded. Dion holds the Guinness World Record for the most Juno Awards won for Album Of The Year (tied with Michael Bublé and Arcade Fire). She won 3 out of the 13 nominations she received in the category throughout her career. She has won the American Music Award for Favorite Adult Contemporary Artist four times from six nominations, the most of any artist. Dion has received two honorary doctorate degrees in music from Université Laval (2008) and Berklee College of Music (2021). She was also presented with the Legion of Honour by former French president Nicolas Sarkozy in 2008 and was elevated to the Companion of the Order of Canada in 2013 by the governor general of Canada, David Johnston for her cultural contributions.

Dion is the best-selling Canadian recording artist, the best-selling French-language artist and one of the best-selling music artists, with record sales exceeding 200 million worldwide. Seven of her albums have each sold over 10 million copies worldwide, the second most among women ever. Her albums such as Falling into You (1996) and Let's Talk About Love (1997) are among the top five best-selling albums by women, as well as The Colour of My Love (1993) and All the Way... A Decade of Song (1999) which both rank within the top 20 respectively. Dion's signature song "My Heart Will Go On" is the second best-selling female single with global sales of more than 18 million. According to Billboard, Dion is the best-selling Canadian artist of the Nielsen Music Canada era. She has scored 16 number-one albums in Canada, six of which have been certified diamond, the most by any artist. In France, Dion has scored six diamond albums, including D'eux (1995) which is the best-selling French-language album, spending an all-time record of 44 weeks atop the French Albums chart.

In the United States, Dion is the sixth highest-certified female artist, with 53 million album units certified by the Recording Industry Association of America. She is also the second best-selling female album artist in the Neilsen Soundscan era (1991–present) with album sales of 53.2 million. Billboard magazine ranked her the eighth greatest female solo artist, the third most successful female artist of the 1990s, and the second best-selling female albums artist of the 2000s in the United States. In 2016, she was listed at number 23 in Billboard's list of the 200 greatest singers. According to the Official Charts Company, Dion was the first artist to have the number-one album & song in the UK simultaneously for five consecutive weeks since the Beatles in 1965, as well as the first woman in British charts history to score two singles with sales exceeding over one million each.

According to Pollstar, Dion had a career total of over US$1.35 billion from ticket sales of her concert tours and residencies, becoming the second woman to accumulate US$1 billion in concert revenue. Her eighth concert tour, Let's Talk About Love World Tour, was the highest-grossing tour by a female act of the 1990s, earning over US$133 million in revenue. She was the highest-grossing solo live music artist in North America of the 2000s with US$522.2 million. Her ninth concert tour, Taking Chances World Tour, was the second highest-grossing tour by a female act of the 2000s, with earnings of US$280 million. Dion is also the highest-grossing residency act, earning a combined US$681 million from two of her residency shows A New Day... (2003–2007) and Celine (2011–2019). Forbes has named her the annual top-earning female musician four times, namely in 1997, 1998, 2004 and 2006.

== Other activities ==
=== Business endeavours ===
Les Productions Feeling Inc., also known as Feeling Inc. or just Feeling, is an artist management company based in Laval, Québec, Canada, and owned by Dion and her husband and manager, Rene Angélil. She is also founder of Nickels Restaurant food chain. She and her husband also own Le Mirage Golf Club and Schwartz's Restaurant. In association with Andre Agassi, Steffi Graf and Shaquille O'Neal, she opened a popular night club called Pure, located at Caesars Palace. Dion launched an eponymous bag and accessories line "Céline Dion Collection". According to Innee-Sedona International, the Asia partner for Bugatti Group said that it already topped $10 million sales after just three collections.

Dion became an entrepreneur with the establishment of her franchise restaurant Nickels in 1990. She has since divested her interests in the chain and is no longer affiliated with Nickels, as of 1997. In 2003, Dion signed a deal with Coty to release Celine Dion Parfums. Her latest fragrance, Signature, was released in September 2011 with an advertising campaign by New York agency Kraftworks NYC. Since its inception, Celine Dion Parfums has grossed over $850 million in retail sales. In October 2004, Air Canada hired Dion as part of their promotional campaign to unveil new service products and an updated livery. "You and I", the theme song sung by Dion, was written by advertising executives working for Air Canada.

=== Philanthropy ===
Dion has actively supported many charity organizations, worldwide. She has promoted the Canadian Cystic Fibrosis Foundation (CCFF) since 1982, and became the foundation's National Celebrity Patron in 1993. She has an emotional attachment to the foundation; her niece Karine died from the disease at the age of sixteen, in Dion's arms. In 2003, she joined a number of other celebrities, athletes, and politicians, including Josh Groban and Yolanda Adams, to support "World Children's Day", a global fundraising effort sponsored by McDonald's. The effort raised money from more than 100 nations and benefited orphanages and children's health organizations. In addition, she has been a major supporter of the T. J. Martell Foundation, the Diana Princess of Wales Memorial Fund, and many health and educational campaigns. During the aftermath of Hurricane Katrina, she donated $1 million to the victims of the storm, and held a fund-raising event for the victims of the 2004 Asian tsunami, which subsequently raised more than $1 million. After the 2008 Sichuan earthquake, she donated $100,000 to China Children & Teenagers' Fund and sent a letter showing her consolation and support. Since 2004, she has been involved, alongside husband René Angelil, with the Québec gay community by supporting the publication of health and HIV prevention materials in Gay Globe Magazine, owned by journalist Roger-Luc Chayer. She is also a member of Canadian charity Artists Against Racism. In November 2018, she launched a gender-neutral clothing line for kids, Celinununu. In 2009, Dion joined an effort with Leonardo DiCaprio, James Cameron and Kate Winslet to donate money to support the nursing home fees of the then-last living survivor of the sinking of the Titanic, Millvina Dean. The campaign resulted in $30,000 as donation.

== Personal life ==
=== Relationships and family ===
Dion first met René Angélil, her future husband and manager, in 1980, when she was 12 and he was 38, after her brother, Michel Dondalinger Dion, had sent him a demonstration recording of "Ce n'était qu'un rêve" ("It Was Only a Dream/Nothing but a Dream"), a song she, her mother Thérèse, and her brother Jacques Dion had jointly written. Over subsequent years, Angélil guided her to stardom in Francophone territories.

After the dissolution (around 1985) of Angélil's second marriage (to Canadian singer Anne Renée), he and Dion took a break from each other professionally, and he spent a major part of the year in Las Vegas, while Dion was learning English and taking dance and vocal lessons in Montreal. Upon his return, "he avoided being alone with me for too long a time", she said in her 2000 autobiography My Story, My Dream. Meanwhile, she kept a photo of Angélil under her pillow, later writing, "Before I fell asleep, I slipped it under the pillow, out of fear that my mother, who always shared a room with me, would find it." She also wrote, "Less and less could I hide from myself the fact that I was in love with René; I had all the symptoms," and "I was in love with a man I couldn't love, who didn't want me to love him, who didn't want to love me." Dion's mother, who traveled everywhere with her until she was 19, was initially wary of her growing infatuation with a much older and twice-divorced Angélil, but Dion was insistent, telling her mother "I'm not a minor. This is a free country. No one has the right to prevent me from loving whoever I want to."

Their professional relationship eventually turned romantic after Dion's win at the Eurovision Song Contest 1988, when she was 20. The romance was known to only family and friends for five years, though Dion nearly revealed it in a tearful 1992 interview with journalist Lise Payette. Many years later, Payette penned the song "Je cherche l'ombre" for Dion's 2007 album D'elles. Dion and Angélil became engaged on 30 March 1993, which was Dion's 25th birthday, and made their relationship public in the liner notes of her 1993 album The Colour of My Love. They married on 17 December 1994, at Notre-Dame Basilica in Montreal, Quebec. On 5 January 2000, Dion and Angélil renewed their wedding vows in Las Vegas.

In May 2000, Dion had two small operations at a fertility clinic in New York to improve her chances of conceiving, after deciding to use in vitro fertilization because of years of failed attempts to conceive. Their first son, René-Charles Angélil, was born on 25 January 2001. Dion suffered a miscarriage in 2009. In May 2010, Dion announced that she was 14 weeks pregnant with twins after a sixth treatment of in vitro fertilization. On Saturday, 23 October 2010, at 11:11 and 11:12 am respectively, Dion gave birth to fraternal twins by Caesarean section at St. Mary's Medical Center in West Palm Beach, Florida. The twins were named Eddy, after Dion's favourite French songwriter, Eddy Marnay, who had also produced her first five albums; and Nelson, after former South African president Nelson Mandela. She appeared with her newborn sons on the cover of 9 December 2010 issue of the Canadian edition of Hello! magazine.

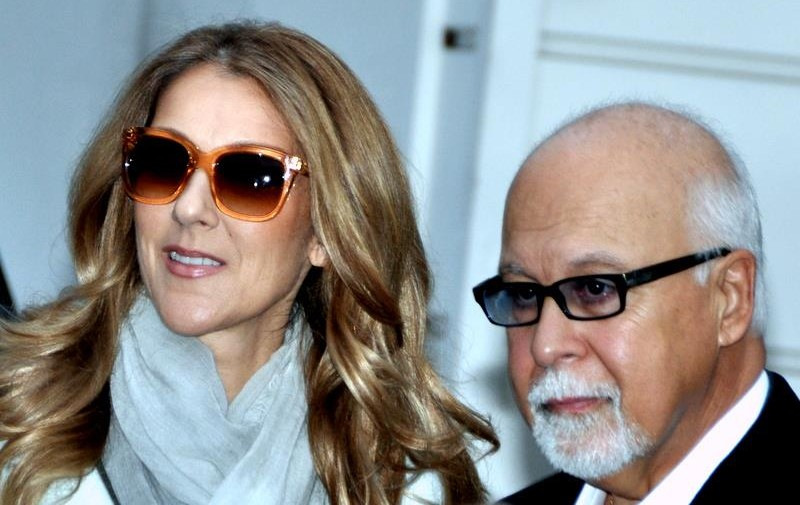
Dion and husband René Angélil in 2012

On 14 January 2016, Angélil died at age 73 of throat cancer. His funeral was held on 22 January 2016, in Notre-Dame Basilica in Montreal, where he and Dion wed 21 years earlier. The couple's eldest son René-Charles gave the eulogy, three days before his 15th birthday. Following Angélil's death, Dion became the sole owner and president of her management and production companies, including CDA Productions and Les Productions Feeling. Two days after Angélil's death—on what would have been her husband's birthday—one of Dion's brothers, Daniel, died at age 59, also of cancer.

=== Health ===
On 22 March 2018, Dion's management team announced that she had been dealing with hearing irregularities for the previous 12 to 18 months due to patulous Eustachian tube and would undergo a minimally invasive surgical procedure to correct the problem after ear-drop medications appeared to be no longer working.

Owing to her slight frame, Dion has been subject to eating disorder rumors for decades, which she has consistently denied: "I don't have an eating problem, and there's nothing more I can say about it"; "My work requires me to be in great physical shape. I wouldn't have been able to give up to a hundred shows a year and travel ceaselessly from one end of the world to the other if I had eaten too much or not enough, or if, as certain magazines have claimed, I made myself throw up after each meal." She has often spoken about having been bullied at school and lacking confidence in her early years in the business: "I didn't have, visually, what it took. I was not pretty, I had teeth problems, and I was very skinny. I didn't fit the mold". Dion took up ballet under the guidance of her former dancer, Naomi Stikeman, who also previously performed for The National Ballet of Canada and La La La Human Steps, and former Cirque du Soleil dancer-turned-fashion-illustrator, Pepe Muñoz, who is also part of her styling team. She is also a skier and a regular at her son René-Charles' hockey games.

In December 2022, Dion disclosed that she had been diagnosed with stiff-person syndrome, a neurological disorder affecting her muscles. In June 2024, Dion said in a People magazine cover story that she had struggled with a variety of mysterious symptoms for 17 years before her diagnosis. She had been treated by Amanda Piquet, an autoimmune neurology specialist at the University of Colorado Anschutz in Aurora, at the time. It was then announced that Dion's charitable foundation would donate $2 million to support the university's autoimmune neurology research for five years. Dion said that with the help of Piquet and other experts, she was preparing to return to the stage: "My voice is being rebuilt as we speak, right now." She returned to performing in September 2026.

=== Wealth ===
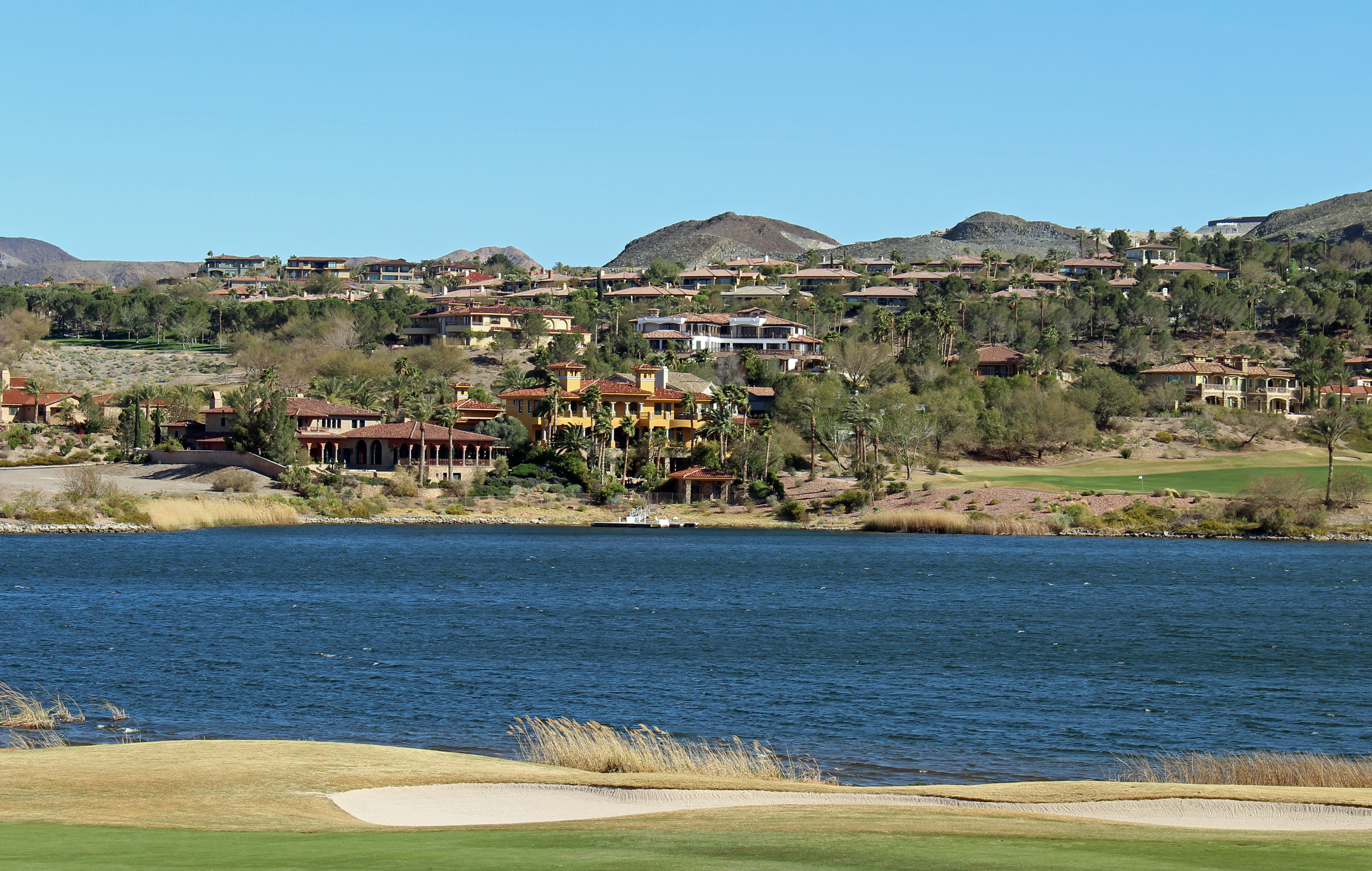
The Henderson neighbourhood on the south shore of Lake Las Vegas where Dion reportedly resides (site obscured by landscaping)

In 2024, Forbes reported that Dion had a net worth of US$550 million, placing her at number 59 on the magazine's list of America's Richest Self-Made Women. In 2023, Dion sold her Summerlin, Nevada house for US$30 million. She previously owned a home on a private island in Montreal, which she sold for US$25.5 million in 2019. In 2017, Dion sold her Jupiter Island, Florida, home for US$38.5 million After the death of her mother in 2020, Dion listed her mother's Laval home for US$1.785 million. As of 2024, Dion resides in a house in Henderson, Nevada, which was reportedly purchased for US$1.5 million in 2003 and as of 2024 was now closer to US$4.5 million in value after renovations.

== Discography ==
=== French-language studio albums ===
- La voix du bon Dieu (1981)
- Céline Dion chante Noël (1981)
- Tellement j'ai d'amour... (1982)
- Les chemins de ma maison (1983)
- Chants et contes de Noël (1983)
- Mélanie (1984)
- C'est pour toi (1985)
- Incognito (1987)
- Dion chante Plamondon (1991)
- D'eux (1995)
- S'il suffisait d'aimer (1998)
- 1 fille & 4 types (2003)
- D'elles (2007)
- Sans attendre (2012)
- Encore un soir (2016)

=== English-language studio albums ===
- Unison (1990)
- Celine Dion (1992)
- The Colour of My Love (1993)
- Falling into You (1996)
- Let's Talk About Love (1997)
- These Are Special Times (1998)
- A New Day Has Come (2002)
- One Heart (2003)
- Miracle (2004)
- Taking Chances (2007)
- Loved Me Back to Life (2013)
- Courage (2019)

== Concert tours and residencies ==
=== Tours ===
- Les chemins de ma maison (1983–1984)
- Céline Dion en concert (1985)
- Tournée Incognito (1988)
- Unison Tour (1990–1991)
- Celine Dion in Concert (1992–1993)
- The Colour of My Love Tour (1994–1995)
- D'eux Tour (1995–1996)
- Falling into You: Around the World (1996–1997)
- Let's Talk About Love World Tour (1998–1999)
- Taking Chances World Tour (2008–2009)
- European Tour 2013
- Summer Tour 2016
- Celine Dion Live 2017
- Celine Dion Live 2018
- Courage World Tour (2019–2020)

=== Residencies ===
- A New Day... (2003–2007)
- Celine (2011–2019)
- Celine Dion Paris 2026–2027

== Filmography ==
- Touched by an Angel
- The Nanny
- All My Children
- La fureur de Céline
- Des fleurs sur la neige
- Quest for Camelot as Juliana (singing voice)
- Behind the Music
- Céline sur les Plaines
- Celine: Through the Eyes of the World
- Sur la piste du Marsupilami
- Hell's Kitchen
- Muppets Most Wanted
- Love Again

== See also ==
- List of music artists by net worth

== Bibliography ==
- Beaulne, Jean (2004). René Angélil: the making of Céline Dion : the unauthorized biography. Dundurn Group. ISBN 978-1-55002-489-0.
- Bogdanov, Vladimir; Woodstra, Chris; Erlewine, Stephen Thomas (2001). Allmusic:The Definitive Guide to Popular Music. Backbeat Books. ISBN 978-0-87930-627-4.
- Céline Dion. Artist direct. Retrieved on 18 December 2005.
- "Celine Dion". Contemporary Musicians, Volume 25. Gale Group, 1999.
- "Celine Dion". Newsmakers 1995, Issue 4. Gale Research, 1995.
- Céline Dion. Rock on the Net. Retrieved 20 November 2005.
- Céline Dion. The Canadian Encyclopedia. Retrieved 2 July 2006
- Céline Dion provided by VH1.com Retrieved 16 August 2005.
- Dion extends long Las Vegas stint. news.bbc.co.uk. Retrieved 5 November 2005.
- Durchholz, Daniel. Review: One Heart. St. Louis Post-Dispatch. St. Louis, Mo.: 24 April 2003. p. F.3
- Germain, Georges-Hébert (1998). Céline: The Authorized Biography. Dundurn Press. p. 1. ISBN 978-1-55002-318-3. "Céline: The Authorized Biography."
- Glatzer, Jenna (2005). Céline Dion: For Keeps. Becker & Mayer Ltd. ISBN 978-0-7407-5559-0. Archived from the original on 7 February 2016.
- Michaels, Sean (22 July 2011). "Celine Dion shuts down parody website". The Guardian. London.
- The 100 Outstanding Pop Vocalist covemagazine.com Retrieved 1 November 2005.
- Joel Whitburn Presents the Billboard Hot 100 Charts: The Nineties (ISBN 0-89820-137-3)
- World Music Awards Diamond Award Retrieved 1 November 2005, (Search by year required)

Awards and achievements
Preceded by (Republic of Ireland) Johnny Logan with "Hold Me Now"	Winner of the Eurovision Song Contest; 1988	Succeeded by (Socialist Federal Republic of Yugoslavia) Riva with "Rock Me"
Preceded by Carol Rich	Switzerland in the Eurovision Song Contest; 1988	Succeeded by Furbaz
