= Dion chante Plamondon =

- Canadian cover

Studio album by Celine Dion
- Released: 4 November 1991
- Recorded: 8 September – 6 October 1991
- Studio: Face B
- Genre: Pop
- Length: 45:08
- Language: French
- Labels: Columbia; Epic
- Producers: Romano Musumarra; Serge Perathoner; Jannick Top

Celine Dion chronology
Unison (1990)	Dion chante Plamondon (1991)	Celine Dion (1992)

Singles from Dion chante Plamondon
- 1. "Je danse dans ma tête" Released: March 1992; 2. "Un garçon pas comme les autres (Ziggy)" Released: June 1993; 3. "L'amour existe encore" Released: January 1994

Dion chante Plamondon (lit. 'Dion sings Plamondon') is the ninth French‑language studio album by Canadian singer Celine Dion. Released on 4 November 1991 by Columbia Records and Epic Records, it consists entirely of songs written by French‑Canadian lyricist Luc Plamondon. In Europe, the album was issued under the title Des mots qui sonnent (lit. 'Words that resonate'). Four promotional singles were released in Quebec, while three commercial singles supported the album in France. Dion chante Plamondon received strong critical and commercial recognition, winning the Juno Award for Francophone Album of the Year and the Félix Award for Best Selling Album of the Year. It topped the chart in Quebec and reached number four in France.

== Content and release ==
The album presents Dion's interpretations of lyrics by Luc Plamondon, a major figure in French‑language songwriting in Canada. It includes four new songs—"Des mots qui sonnent", "Je danse dans ma tête", "Quelqu'un que j'aime, quelqu'un qui m'aime", and "L'amour existe encore"—alongside eight covers, many drawn from the rock opera Starmania. These include "Le monde est stone", "Le blues du businessman", "Un garçon pas comme les autres (Ziggy)", and "Les uns contre les autres", originally performed by artists such as Fabienne Thibeault and Claude Dubois. Additional covers include Martine St-Clair's "Le fils de Superman", Diane Dufresne's "Oxygène" and "J'ai besoin d'un chum", and Marie Carmen's "Piaf chanterait du rock".

Dion chante Plamondon was released in Canada on 4 November 1991. It was issued in France, Belgium, and Switzerland on 4 May 1992, in Australia on 25 January 1993, and worldwide in 1994, becoming Dion's first French‑language album to receive global distribution. Four different cover artworks were produced for the Canadian, Francophone European, Japanese, and international editions.

== Critical reception ==
Professional ratings
Review scores
Source	Rating
AllMusic	2.5/5 stars
Billboard	positive
Entertainment Weekly	C
Public	17.5/20

Dion chante Plamondon received a generally positive critical response, with many reviewers noting Dion's vocal assurance and the album's theatrical, rock‑opera‑influenced material. Billboard critic Larry LeBlanc named it one of the best albums of 1992, writing that "Dion's French‑language recordings outrank her English pop output".

AllMusic highlighted Dion's vocal maturity and adaptability, pointing to the album's stylistic range—from the dramatic "Le fils de Superman" to the funk‑leaning "Je danse dans ma tête", the blues‑shaded "Les uns contre les autres", and the ballad "Le blues du businessman".

Entertainment Weekly offered a more mixed view, describing the album as ambitious but uneven and suggesting that its theatrical approach may feel overwhelming to listeners less familiar with Plamondon's writing style.

Retrospective assessments have been even more favourable. French magazine Public rated the album 17.5/20, praising its dramatic scope and Dion's expressive delivery.

== Commercial performance ==
=== 1991–1992 in Canada ===
In Quebec, four promotional singles were issued to support the album, each helping increase its presence on provincial radio. In November 1991, "Des mots qui sonnent" reached number 10 on pop radio, becoming the album's first notable airplay success. It was followed by "L'amour existe encore", which peaked at number 16 on adult contemporary stations and maintained interest into early 1992. Momentum grew further in March 1992 when "Je danse dans ma tête" climbed to number three, becoming one of Dion's strongest Francophone radio hits of the period. The promotional campaign concluded in August 1992 with "Quelqu'un que j'aime, quelqu'un qui m'aime", which topped the airplay chart and reinforced the album's visibility across Quebec media.

Supported by this steady sequence of radio airplay, the album became one of the year's major commercial performers in Quebec, spending seven weeks at number one. Although it reached only number 57 on the Canadian Albums Chart—because Quebec sales were excluded from the national tally at the time—it was certified double platinum in Canada, reflecting its strong regional impact and the depth of Dion's Francophone audience.

=== 1992–1994 in France ===
In France, the album was released under the title Des mots qui sonnent and initially did not chart, receiving limited attention upon its debut. Its commercial trajectory shifted in 1993 when the single "Un garçon pas comme les autres (Ziggy)" became a major hit. The song peaked at number two, earned a gold certification, and introduced Dion to a wider French audience. An English‑language version of the track also appeared on the successful Tycoon compilation, further increasing its exposure.

Following the success of "Ziggy", the album entered the French charts for the first time in September 1993—nearly a year after its release. Its renewed momentum continued into 1994 with the third single, "L'amour existe encore", which reached number 31 in January. The album climbed steadily over the following months, eventually peaking at number four and remaining on the chart for a full year. It was certified double platinum in France and has sold more than one million copies in the country, becoming Dion's first major Francophone breakthrough in the French market.

=== 1994 worldwide ===
When the album was released internationally in 1994, it received no dedicated promotion, as Dion's English‑language career was beginning to expand rapidly. However, two tracks—"L'amour existe encore" and "Le monde est stone"—were included as B‑sides on the international single "Think Twice", giving the album indirect exposure outside Francophone markets.

Despite the absence of active marketing, worldwide sales of Dion chante Plamondon exceed two million copies. The album also sold 275,000 copies in the United States as of June 2014, an uncommon result for a French‑language release.

On the Belgian Wallonia chart, available since April 1995, the album peaked at number 17 and was certified gold in November 1995, further demonstrating its lasting appeal in Francophone regions.

== Accolades ==
Dion chante Plamondon won the Juno Award for Francophone Album of the Year in 1993. It also won the Félix Award for Best Selling Album of the Year in 1992 and was nominated for Pop/Rock Album of the Year. "Quelqu'un que j'aime, quelqu'un qui m'aime" was nominated for Most Popular Song of the Year in 1993, and "L'amour existe encore" received a nomination for Video of the Year in 1994. Dion was nominated for Female Vocalist of the Year in 1992, 1993, and 1994, winning in 1994. "Je danse dans ma tête" won the MuchMusic Video Award for Best Adult Contemporary Video in 1992, and Dion received a nomination for Francophone Artist of the Year at the Victoires de la Musique in 1994. The Dion chante Plamondon television special was also nominated for two Gémeaux Awards in 1992.

== Track listing ==
All tracks were produced by Jannick Top and Serge Perathoner, except "Je danse dans ma tête", produced by Romano Musumarra.

No.	Title	Writer(s)	Length
1.	"Des mots qui sonnent"	Luc Plamondon; Aldo Nova; Marty Simon	3:55
2.	"Le monde est stone"	Plamondon; Michel Berger	3:40
3.	"J'ai besoin d'un chum"	Plamondon; François Cousineau	4:04
4.	"Le fils de Superman"	Plamondon; Germain Gauthier	4:33
5.	"Je danse dans ma tête"	Plamondon; Musumarra	4:14
6.	"Le blues du businessman"	Plamondon; Berger	4:30
7.	"Piaf chanterait du rock"	Plamondon; Gauthier	3:22
8.	"Un garçon pas comme les autres (Ziggy)"	Plamondon; Berger	2:58
9.	"Quelqu'un que j'aime, quelqu'un qui m'aime"	Plamondon; Erown	3:40
10.	"Les uns contre les autres"	Plamondon; Berger	3:10
11.	"Oxygène"	Plamondon; Gauthier	6:00
12.	"L'amour existe encore"	Plamondon; Riccardo Cocciante	3:52
Total length:			45:08

=== Notes ===
- The US, Australian and Asian editions omit "J'ai besoin d'un chum" and "Piaf chanterait du rock".

== Personnel ==
Adapted from AllMusic.

- Celine Dion – lead vocals, background vocals
- Marina Albert – background vocals, choir
- René Angélil – art direction
- Michel Berger – composer
- Riccardo Cocciante – composer
- Germain Gauthier – composer
- François Cousineau – composer
- Laurent Gatignol – recording engineer
- Manu Guiot – mixing
- Denys Lable – guitar
- Vito Luprano – art direction, executive producer
- Romano Musumarra – arranger, composer, producer
- Aldo Nova – composer
- Serge Perathoner – arranger, keyboards, producer
- Luc Plamondon – composer
- Claude Salmiéri – drums, cymbals
- Eric Seva – saxophone
- Erown – composer
- Marty Simon – composer
- Jannick Top – arranger, electric bass, producer
- Christine Wilson – artwork, illustrations

== Charts ==
=== Weekly charts ===
Weekly chart performance
Chart (1991–1995)	Peak position
Belgian Albums (Ultratop Wallonia)	17
Canada Top Albums/CDs (RPM)	76
Canadian Albums (The Record)	57
French Albums (SNEP)	4
Quebec (ADISQ)	1

=== Year-end charts ===
1993 year-end chart performance
Chart (1993)	Position
French Albums (SNEP)	9

1994 year-end chart performance
Chart (1994)	Position
French Albums (SNEP)	40

1995 year-end chart performance
Chart (1995)	Position
Belgian Albums (Ultratop Wallonia)	47
Belgian Francophone Albums (Ultratop Wallonia)	19

== Certifications and sales ==
Certifications
Region	Certification	Certified units/sales
Belgium (BRMA)	Gold	25,000^{*}
Canada (Music Canada)	2× Platinum	200,000^{^}
France (SNEP)	2× Platinum	1,000,000
United States	—	275,000
Summaries
Worldwide	—	2,000,000
^{*} Sales figures based on certification alone.^{^} Shipments figures based on certification alone.

== Release history ==
Release history
Region	Date	Label	Format	Catalog	Edition
Canada	4 November 1991	Columbia	CD; LP; cassette	80168	Dion chante Plamondon (12 tracks)
France; Belgium; Switzerland	4 May 1992	Columbia	CD; cassette	471344	Des mots qui sonnent (12 tracks)
Australia	25 January 1993	Epic	CD; cassette	477215	Dion chante Plamondon (10 tracks)
United Kingdom	16 May 1994	Epic	CD	4713442	Dion chante Plamondon (10 tracks)
United States	31 May 1994	Epic	CD; cassette	64363	Dion chante Plamondon (10 tracks)
Japan	21 November 1994	SMEJ	CD	ESCA-6101	Dion chante Plamondon (10 tracks)

== See also ==
- Juno Award for Francophone Album of the Year
