= L'amour existe encore =

Single by Celine Dion

from the album Dion chante Plamondon
- Language: French
- B-side: "Le monde est stone"
- Released: January 1994
- Recorded: 8 September – 6 October 1991
- Studio: Face B (Paris)
- Genre: Pop
- Length: 3:49
- Label: Columbia
- Songwriters: Luc Plamondon; Riccardo Cocciante
- Producers: Jannick Top; Serge Perathoner

Celine Dion singles chronology
"The Power of Love" (1993)	"L'amour existe encore" (1994)	"Misled" (1994)

Music video
- "L'amour existe encore" on YouTube

"L'amour existe encore" (lit. 'Love still exists') is a song by Canadian singer Celine Dion from her tenth studio album, Dion chante Plamondon (1991). It was written by Luc Plamondon and Riccardo Cocciante, and produced by Jannick Top and Serge Perathoner. "L'amour existe encore" was issued as a promotional single in Quebec, Canada in November 1991, and commercially released in France in January 1994. The song reached number 16 on the airplay chart in Quebec and number 31 in France.

== Background and release ==
"L'amour existe encore" was written by Luc Plamondon and Riccardo Cocciante, with production by Jannick Top and Serge Perathoner. It appears on Dion's tenth studio album, Dion chante Plamondon (1991). In November 1991, "L'amour existe encore" and "Des mots qui sonnent" were issued simultaneously as the first promotional singles in Quebec, Canada. The commercial single followed in France in January 1994. Dion performed "L'amour existe encore" regularly in concert. In 2005, it was included on her greatest hits album, On ne change pas.

== Commercial performance ==
"L'amour existe encore" entered the airplay chart in Quebec, Canada on 18 November 1991, reaching number 16 and remaining on the chart for 20 weeks. In France, it entered the chart in early 1994 and peaked at number 31. A duet version with Éric Lapointe was released on his album Ailleurs – Volume 1 in 2009. It charted in Canada in May 2009, reaching number eight on the airplay chart in Quebec and number 34 on the Canadian Adult Contemporary chart.

== Music video ==
The music video for "L'amour existe encore" was filmed in December 1993 and directed by Alain DesRochers. It premiered in January 1994. The video was nominated for Video of the Year at the Félix Awards in Quebec, Canada. In 2005, it was included on Dion's greatest hits DVD collection, On ne change pas.

== Spanish version ==
In 2002, Dion recorded a Spanish version of "L'amour existe encore", titled "Aún Existe Amor". It was included on her eighteenth studio album, A New Day Has Come. The Spanish lyrics were written by Ignacio Ballesteros-Diaz. Sony Music issued a promotional single in the United States in May 2002, and Dion performed "Aún Existe Amor" at the 2002 Latin Billboard Music Awards, where she received a special award for her hit "My Heart Will Go On", which became the first English-language song to top the Billboard's Hot Latin Tracks chart.

== Formats and track listing ==
- French 12-inch, cassette, and CD single
1. "L'amour existe encore" – 3:49
2. "Le monde est stone" – 3:41

== Charts ==
Original version
Chart (1991–1994)	Peak position
France (SNEP)	31
Quebec Radio Songs (ADISQ)	16

2009 duet with Éric Lapointe
Chart (2009)	Peak position
Canada AC (Billboard)	34
Quebec Radio Songs (BDS)	8

== Release history ==
Release history
Region	Date	Format	Label	Ref.
France	January 1994	12-inch; cassette; CD	Columbia	
