= Des mots qui sonnent (song) =

Song by Canadian singer Celine Dion

Promotional single by Celine Dion

from the album Dion chante Plamondon
- Language: French
- Released: November 1991
- Recorded: 8 September – 6 October 1991
- Studio: Face B (Paris)
- Genre: Pop
- Length: 3:56
- Label: Columbia
- Songwriters: Luc Plamondon; Aldo Nova; Marty Simon
- Producers: Jannick Top; Serge Perathoner

Music video
- "Des mots qui sonnent" on YouTube

"Des mots qui sonnent" (lit. 'Words that resonate') is a 1991 French-language song by Canadian singer Celine Dion, included on her tenth studio album, Dion chante Plamondon. The track is based on the music of "Nothing Can Stop My Love", originally recorded by American R&B singer Angela Clemmons for her 1987 album This Is Love. The French lyrics were written by Luc Plamondon, and the song was produced by Jannick Top and Serge Perathoner. Released as a promotional single in Quebec in November 1991, "Des mots qui sonnent" reached number 10 on the province's radio chart.

== Background and release ==
Dion recorded "Des mots qui sonnent" for her tenth studio album, Dion chante Plamondon. Luc Plamondon wrote the French lyrics to music composed by Aldo Nova and Marty Simon. The track was produced by Jannick Top and Serge Perathoner. In November 1991, "Des mots qui sonnent" and "L'amour existe encore" were issued simultaneously as the album's first promotional singles in Quebec. The song was later included on Dion's 2005 greatest hits compilation, On ne change pas.

== Critical reception ==
AllMusic editor Jose F. Promis wrote that Dion's voice exudes a passion beyond her young years, particularly on the album's energetic opener, "Des mots qui sonnent".

== Commercial performance ==
"Des mots qui sonnent" entered the chart in Quebec on 25 November 1991 and peaked at number 10, spending 17 weeks on the chart.

== Music video ==
The music video for "Des mots qui sonnent" was directed by Alain DesRochers and released in November 1991. It includes appearances by Luc Plamondon and Aldo Nova. In 2005, the video was included on Dion's greatest hits DVD collection, On ne change pas. In February 2012, it was uploaded to Dion's YouTube channel.

== Charts ==
Chart performance
Chart (1991)	Peak position
Quebec Radio Songs (ADISQ)	10
