= Celine Dion videography =

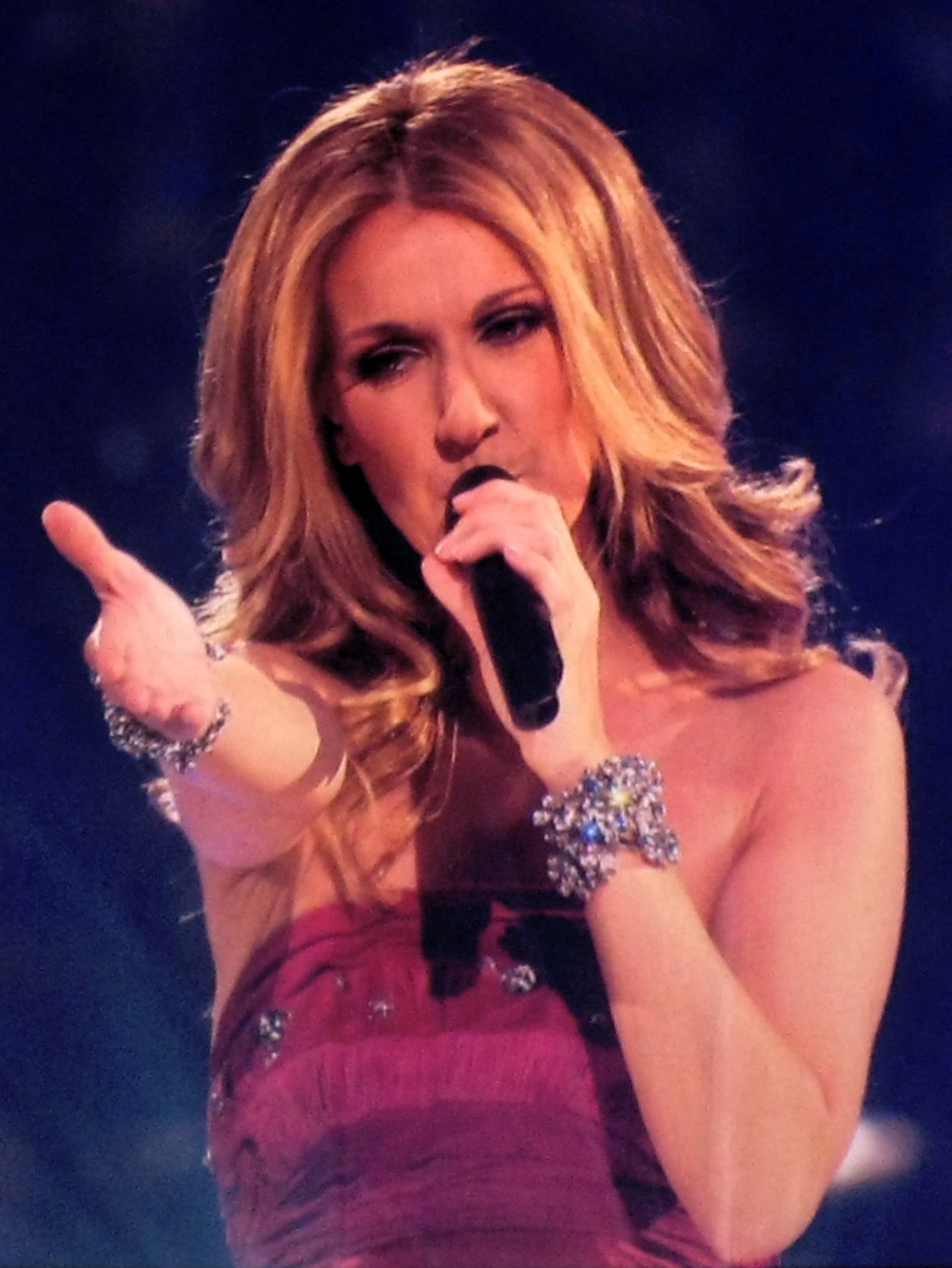
- Dion performing in 2008.
- DVDs: 13

Canadian singer Celine Dion was only 12 years old when she wrote her debut single, "Ce n'était qu'un rêve", with the help of her mother and her brother Jacques. It was promoted with her first music video in 1981. Her DVDs/videos found considerable commercial success, mostly filmed from her concerts.

In 1996, Dion released arguably the biggest music video of her career "It's All Coming Back to Me Now". Today called it "one of her biggest videos in the 90s".

In 2008, Live in Las Vegas: A New Day... became the only music DVD to be certified Triple Diamond in Canada, selling over 300,000 units and garnered the largest debut in Nielsen SoundScan history for a DVD-only release, with over 70,000 copies sold in its first week, which is something that has never occurred before in Canadian music history.

In 2018, Dion released "Ashes" (from Deadpool 2) accompanied by a music video. Time magazine called it "pure artistry", complimenting the interpretative dance routine and the chemistry. Paste magazine called it "fabulous".

== International video and DVD releases ==
Information
Unison
- Released: 2 July 1991
- Video collection
- VHS
The Colour of My Love Concert
- Released: 19 October 1995
- Concert
- VHS, DVD
Live à Paris
- Released: 8 November 1996
- Concert
- VHS, DVD
...Live in Memphis 1997
- Released: 2 November 1998
- Concert
- VHS
Au cœur du stade
- Released: 30 August 1999
- Concert
- VHS, DVD
All the Way... A Decade of Song & Video
- Released: 20 February 2001
- Video collection
- VHS, DVD
VH1 Divas Las Vegas
- Released: 22 October 2002
- Concert
- CD/DVD
On ne change pas
- Released: 18 November 2005
- Video collection
- DVD
Live in Las Vegas: A New Day...
- Released: 7 December 2007
- Concert
- 2 DVDs, 2 Blu-ray Discs
Céline sur les Plaines
- Released: 11 November 2008
- Concert
- DVD
Celine: Through the Eyes of the World
- Released: 29 April 2010
- Concert documentary
- DVD, Blu-ray Disc, 2 DVDs
Taking Chances World Tour: The Concert
- Released: 29 April 2010
- Concert
- DVD/CD, 2 DVDs
Céline... une seule fois / Live 2013
- Released: 19 May 2014
- Concert
- DVD/2CD, Blu-ray/2CD

== Music videos ==
Year	Title	Album	Director
1981	"Ce n'était qu'un rêve"^{1}	La voix du bon Dieu	—
1983	"D'amour ou d'amitié"^{1}	Tellement j'ai d'amour...	—
1984	"Mon ami m'a quittée"^{2}	Les chemins de ma maison	—
1984	"Ne me plaignez pas"^{2}	Les chemins de ma maison	—
1985	"Les yeux de la faim" (With various artists) (Studio video)	Non-album single	—
1985	"Vois comme c'est beau"^{3}	Non-album single	—
1985	"C'est pour toi"^{3}	C'est pour toi	—
1985	"C'est pour vivre"^{3}	C'est pour toi	—
1985	"Listen To The Magic Man"	Non-album single	—
1986	"Fais ce que tu voudras"	Les chansons en or	François Girard
1987	"La religieuse"	Non-album single	—
1987	"On traverse un miroir"^{4}	Incognito	Jacques Payette
1987	"Lolita (trop jeune pour aimer)"^{4}	Incognito	Jacques Payette
1987	"Comme un cœur froid"^{4}	Incognito	Jacques Payette
1987	"Délivre-moi"^{4}	Incognito	Jacques Payette
1987	"Jours de fièvre"^{4}	Incognito	Jacques Payette
1987	"Partout je te vois"^{4}	Incognito	Jacques Payette
1987	"Incognito"	Incognito	Jacques Payette
1987	"Lolita (trop jeune pour aimer)"	Incognito	Jacques Payette
1988	"Ne partez pas sans moi"	Incognito	—
1988	"Délivre-moi"	Incognito	—
1989	"Can't Live with You, Can't Live Without You"	Non-album single	—
1990	"(If There Was) Any Other Way" (Canadian version)	Unison	Derek Chase
1990	"Unison" (Single Mix)	Unison	Robin Miller
1990	"Where Does My Heart Beat Now" (Canadian version) (B&W version)	Unison	—
1990	"Where Does My Heart Beat Now" (Canadian version) (Orange/brown version)	Unison	—
1990	"Where Does My Heart Beat Now" (U.S. version)	Unison	David Phillips
1991	"(If There Was) Any Other Way" (U.S. version)	Unison	Dominic Orlando
1991	"The Last to Know"	Unison	Dominic Orlando
1991	"Where Does My Heart Beat Now" (Special version)	Unison	David Phillips
1991	"Des mots qui sonnent"	Dion chante Plamondon	Alain DesRochers
1991	"Voices That Care" (Various) (Studio)	Non-album single	David S. Jackson
1991	"Beauty and the Beast" (with Peabo Bryson) (Studio)	Celine Dion	Dominic Orlando
1992	"Je danse dans ma tête"	Dion chante Plamondon	Alain DesRochers
1992	"If You Asked Me To"	Celine Dion	Dominic Orlando
1992	"Nothing Broken but My Heart"	Celine Dion	Lyne Charlebois
1992	"Love Can Move Mountains"	Celine Dion	Jeb Brian
1993	"Water From The Moon" (B&W version)	Celine Dion	—
1993	"Water From The Moon" (Yellow/brown version)	Celine Dion	—
1993	"Un garçon pas comme les autres (Ziggy)"	Dion chante Plamondon	Lewis Furey
1993	"Ziggy"	Tycoon	Lewis Furey
1993	"When I Fall in Love" (with Clive Griffin)	The Colour of My Love	Dominic Orlando
1993	"Did You Give Enough Love"	Celine Dion	Alain DesRochers
1993	"The Power of Love"	The Colour of My Love	Randee St. Nicholas
1994	"L'amour existe encore"	Dion chante Plamondon	Alain DesRochers
1994	"Misled"	The Colour of My Love	Randee St. Nicholas
1994	"Think Twice"	The Colour of My Love	Randee St. Nicholas
1994	"Think Twice" (TOTP version)	The Colour of My Love	Randee St. Nicholas
1995	"Only One Road"	The Colour of My Love	Greg Masuak
1995	"Pour que tu m'aimes encore"	D'eux	Michel Meyer
1995	"Je sais pas"	D'eux	Greg Masuak
1995	"Je sais pas" (Singing version)	D'eux	Greg Masuak
1995	"Next Plane Out"	The Colour of My Love	Greg Masuak
1995	"To Love You More" (featuring Taro Hakase)	Falling into You	—
1996	"Falling into You"	Falling into You	Nigel Dick
1996	"Because You Loved Me"	Falling into You	Kevin Bray
1996	"It's All Coming Back to Me Now"	Falling into You	Nigel Dick
1996	"It's All Coming Back to Me Now" (Single version)	Falling into You	Nigel Dick
1996	"To Love You More" (with Taro Hakase) (Live - from the Falling Into You Around the World Tour)	Falling into You	Bud Schaetzle
1996	"All by Myself"	Falling into You	Nigel Dick
1996	"All by Myself" (UK Christmas version)	Falling into You	—
1996	"Sola otra vez"	Falling into You	Nigel Dick
1996	"Les derniers seront les premiers" (with Jean-Jacques Goldman) (Live - from the D'eux Tour)	Live à Paris	Gérard Pullicino
1997	"All by Myself" (Live - from the Falling Into You Around the World Tour)	Falling into You	—
1997	"Call the Man"	Falling into You	Greg Masuak
1997	"Call the Man" (Live - from the Falling Into You Around the World Tour)	Falling into You	Bud Schaetzle
1997	"J'attendais" (Live - from the D'eux Tour)	Live à Paris	Gérard Pullicino
1997	"Tell Him" (with Barbra Streisand)	Let's Talk About Love	Scott Lochmus
1997	"The Reason" (Studio)	Let's Talk About Love	Scott Lochmus
1997	"My Heart Will Go On"	Let's Talk About Love	Bille Woodruff
1998	"Immortality" (featuring the Bee Gees) (Studio version)	Let's Talk About Love	Scott Lochmus
1998	"Immortality" (featuring the Bee Gees)	Let's Talk About Love	Randee St. Nicholas
1998	"I Hate You Then I Love You" (with Luciano Pavarotti) (Live)	Let's Talk About Love	Michael Kamen
1998	"Zora sourit"	S'il suffisait d'aimer	Yannick Saillet
1998	"I'm Your Angel" (with R. Kelly) (Studio version)	These Are Special Times	Bille Woodruff
1998	"I'm Your Angel" (with R. Kelly)	These Are Special Times	Bille Woodruff
1999	"S'il suffisait d'aimer" (Live - from the Let's Talk About Love Tour)	S'il suffisait d'aimer	Yannick Saillet
1999	"On ne change pas"	S'il suffisait d'aimer	Gilbert Namiand
1999	"On ne change pas" (Version 2)	S'il suffisait d'aimer	Gilbert Namiand
1999	"Treat Her Like a Lady" (Live - from the Let's Talk About Love Tour)	Let's Talk About Love	Gérard Pullicino
1999	"Dans un autre monde" (Live - from the Let's Talk About Love Tour)	Au cœur du stade	Gérard Pullicino
1999	"That's the Way It Is"	All the Way... A Decade of Song	Liz Friedlander
1999	"Then You Look at Me"	All the Way... A Decade of Song	Bille Woodruff
2000	"Live (for the One I Love)"	All the Way... A Decade of Song	Bille Woodruff
2000	"The First Time Ever I Saw Your Face" (Performance - from the 1999 CBS Special)	All the Way... A Decade of Song	Bud Schaetzle
2000	"I Want You to Need Me"	All the Way... A Decade of Song	Liz Friedlander
2000	"If Walls Could Talk"	All the Way... A Decade of Song	Liz Friedlander
2000	"Sous le vent" (with Garou) (Studio version)	Seul	—
2001	"Sous le vent" (with Garou)	Seul	Istan Rozumny
2001	"God Bless America" (Studio)	God Bless America	—
2001	"What More Can I Give" (With the All Stars) (Studio)	Non-album single	—
2002	"A New Day Has Come"	A New Day Has Come	Dave Meyers
2002	"I'm Alive" (Stuart Little 2 version)	A New Day Has Come	Dave Meyers
2002	"I'm Alive" (International version)	A New Day Has Come	Dave Meyers
2002	"Goodbye's (The Saddest Word)"	A New Day Has Come	Chris Applebaum
2003	"I Drove All Night"	One Heart	Peter Arnell
2003	"Have You Ever Been in Love" (Performance version)	One Heart	—
2003	"Have You Ever Been in Love"	One Heart	Antti Jokinen
2003	"One Heart"	One Heart	Antti Jokinen
2003	"Tout l'or des hommes"	1 fille & 4 types	Yannick Saillet
2003	"Et je t'aime encore"	1 fille & 4 types	Yannick Saillet
2004	"Contre nature"	1 fille & 4 types	Didier Kerbrat
2004	"You Shook Me All Night Long" (Live) (with Anastacia)	VH1 Divas Las Vegas	Louis J. Horvitz
2004	"You and I"	A New Day... Live in Las Vegas	Andrew MacNaughtan
2004	"Je lui dirai"	Miracle	Scott Lochmus
2004	"Ma Nouvelle-France"	On ne change pas	Jean Beaudin
2005	"Je ne vous oublie pas"	On ne change pas	Didier Kerbrat
2005	"Come Together Now" (as part of the Come Together Now Collaborative)	Hurricane Relief: Come Together Now	—
2006	"Tous les secrets"	On ne change pas	—
2006	"Let Your Heart Decide"	On ne change pas	—
2006	"Tout près du bonheur" (with Marc Dupré)	Refaire le monde	Ivan Grbovic
2007	"Et s'il n'en restait qu'une (je serais celle-là)"	D'elles	Thierry Vargnes
2007	"Immensité"	D'elles	—
2007	"Taking Chances"	Taking Chances	Paul Boyd
2007	"A World To Believe In" (with Yuna Ito) (Studio)	Taking Chances	—
2008	"Alone" (Performance - from the 2008 CBS Special)	Taking Chances	—
2008	"Eyes On Me" (Live - from the Taking Chances Tour)	Taking Chances	—
2008	"My Love" (Live - from the Taking Chances Tour)	My Love: Essential Collection	Stéphane Laporte
2010	"We Are the World 25 for Haiti" (as part of Artists for Haiti)	Non-album single	Paul Haggis
2010	"All by Myself" (from Through the Eyes of the World)	Non-album single	Stéphane Laporte
2010	"Y'a pas de mots" (with Marc Dupré)	Entre deux mondes	—
2010	"Voler" (with Michel Sardou)	Être une femme 2010	—
2012	"Parler à mon père" (Lyric video)	Sans attendre	—
2012	"Parler à mon père"	Sans attendre	Thierry Vergnes
2012	"Le miracle"	Sans attendre	Thierry Vergnes
2013	"Le miracle" (Official fan version)	Sans attendre	—
2013	"Qui peut vivre sans amour?"	Sans attendre	Thierry Vergnes
2013	"Loved Me Back to Life" (Live - from Céline... une seule fois)	Loved Me Back to Life	Jean Lamoureux
2013	"Loved Me Back to Life" (Lyric video)	Loved Me Back to Life	—
2014	"Celle qui m'a tout appris" (Live - from Céline... une seule fois)	Céline... une seule fois / Live 2013	Jean Lamoureux
2014	"Incredible" (with Ne-Yo)	Loved Me Back to Life	Zach Merck
2015	"L'hymne" (with Fred Pellerin) (Studio)	La guerre des tuques 3D	Scott Lochmus and Robert Yates
2016	"Hymn" (Studio)	Snowtime!	Scott Lochmus and Robert Yates
2016	"Encore un soir" (Lyric video)	Encore un soir	—
2016	"Trois heures vingt" (Lyric video)	Encore un soir	—
2017	"L'étoile" (Lyric video)	Encore un soir	—
2017	"How Does a Moment Last Forever"	Beauty and the Beast	Bill Condon
2018	"Ashes"	Deadpool 2	David Leitch
2019	"Tu trouveras la paix" (for Renée Claude—with Isabelle Boulay, Luce Dufault, Diane Dufresne, Louise Forestier, Laurence Jalbert, Catherine Major, Ariane Moffatt, Marie Denise Pelletier, Ginette Reno and Marie-Élaine Thibert)	Non-album single	Patrick Peris
2019	"Flying On My Own" (Live from Las Vegas)	Courage	—
2019	"Flying On My Own" (Lyric video)	Courage	—
2019	"Imperfections"	Courage	Gabriel Coutu-Dumont
2019	"Courage"	Courage	Se Oh
2020	"The Prayer" (duet with Andrea Bocelli) (Lyric video)	These Are Special Times	—
2023	"My Heart Will Go On" (25th anniversary alternate video)	Let's Talk About Love	Bille Woodruff
2023	"Love Again" (Lyric video)	Love Again	James C. Strouse
2023	"I'll Be" (Lyric video)	Love Again	—
2023	"Waiting on You" (Lyric video)	Love Again	—
2024	"Love Again" (2024 lyric video)	Love Again	Alex McLeod
2024	"Hymne à l'amour" (Live from the Olympic Games 2024)	Non-album single	—
2026	"Dansons"	TBA	Max Allouche

- ^{1} Music video made from an early TV special performance.
- ^{2} Music video made specially for the Sur les chemins de ma maison TV special. Not an official commercial video.
- ^{3} Music video made specially for the C'est pour toi TV special. Not an official commercial video.
- ^{4} Music video made specially for the Incognito TV special which aired in September 1987. Produced by Canadian Broadcasting Corporation. Not an official commercial video.

== Filmography ==
Title	Year	Role	Director	Notes	Ref
Quest for Camelot	1998	Juliana (singing voice)	Frederik Du Chau	Voice role	
Celine: Through the Eyes of the World	2010	Herself	Stéphane Laporte	Documentary	
Houba! On the Trail of the Marsupilami	2012	Herself	Alain Chabat	Cameo	
Muppets Most Wanted	2014	Piggy's Fairy Godmother	James Bobin	Feature film	
Love Again	2023	Herself	James C. Strouse	Feature film	
I Am: Celine Dion	2024	Herself	Irene Taylor	Documentary	

== Television ==
Title	Year	Role	Network	Notes
Des fleurs sur la neige	1991	Élisa Trudel	Radio Canada	Miniseries
The Colour of My Love Concert	1994	Herself	VHS	Concert
The Nanny	1997	Herself	CBS	Episode: "Fran's Gotta Have It" (Season 4, episode 26)
Touched by an Angel	1998	Herself	CBS	Episode: "Psalm 151" (Season 5, episode 9)
These Are Special Times	1998	Herself	CBS	Concert
La Petite Vie	1999	Herself	Radio-Canada	Episode: "Noël Chez les Paré"
Behind the Music	2000	Herself	VH1	Episode: "Celine Dion"
The Princes of Malibu	2005	Herself	Fox	Episode: "31 July 2005"
All My Children	2007	Herself	ABC	Episode: "#1.9752"
American Idol	2007–2008	Herself/ Musical guest	Fox	Seasons 6–7
Hell's Kitchen	2013	Herself	Fox	Episode: "Twenty Chefs Compete"
Red Nose Day	2016	Herself	NBC	Special
Celine Dion at the BBC	2022	Herself	BBC	A collection of Celine Dion's biggest hits performed at the BBC.
