= Gold Vol. 2 =

Compilation album by Celine Dion
- Released: 2 October 1995
- Recorded: 1983–1987
- Genre: Pop
- Length: 58:34
- Label: Versailles
- Producers: Pierre Bazinet; Eddy Marnay; Romano Musumarra; Aldo Nova; Rudi Pascal; Jean Roussel

Celine Dion chronology
Gold Vol. 1 (1995)	Gold Vol. 2 (1995)	Falling into You (1996)

Gold Vol. 2 is a French-language compilation album by Canadian singer Celine Dion, released in France by Versailles on 2 October 1995. It includes 13 songs recorded between 1983 and 1987, among them the entire Incognito album. In France, it was certified gold. Gold Vol. 2 was also issued in Belgium, where it reached number 51 on the Wallonia chart.

== Background and release ==
After the success of D'eux, which became the best-selling French-language album of all time, Versailles released Gold Vol. 2 on 2 October 1995 as the second compilation of Dion's early and rare recordings from the 1980s, following Gold Vol. 1. It includes the full 1987 album Incognito.

== Commercial performance ==
Gold Vol. 2 peaked at number 51 in Belgium's Wallonia in May 1996 and was certified gold in France in 1998 for sales of over 100,000 copies. In 1997, the album was reissued as Les premières chansons vol. 2.

== Track listing ==
No.	Title	Writer(s)	Producer(s)	Length
1.	"Incognito"	Luc Plamondon; Jean Roussel	Roussel	4:39
2.	"Lolita (trop jeune pour aimer)"	Plamondon; Daniel Lavoie	Roussel	4:20
3.	"On traverse un miroir"	Isa Minoke; Robert Lafond	Aldo Nova	4:41
4.	"Partout je te vois"	Eddy Marnay; Nova	Nova	4:09
5.	"Jours de fièvre"	Marnay; Roussel	Roussel	5:13
6.	"D'abord, c'est quoi l'amour"	Marnay; Steven Tracey	Nova	4:23
7.	"Délivre-moi"	Marnay; E. G. Daily; Harold Faltermeyer	Pierre Bazinet	4:19
8.	"Comme un cœur froid"	Marnay; Roussel	Roussel	5:13
9.	"Mon ami m'a quittée"	Marnay; Christian Loigerot; Thierry Geoffroy	Marnay; Rudi Pascal	2:59
10.	"La dodo la do"	Marnay; Christian Gaubert	Marnay; Pascal	3:02
11.	"Hymne à l'amitié"	Marnay; Dario Baldan Bembo; Nini Giacomelli; Sergio Bardotti	Marnay; Pascal	4:05
12.	"Je ne veux pas"	Marnay; Romano Musumarra	Musumarra	4:05
13.	"C'est pour vivre"	Marnay; André Popp	Marnay; Pascal	4:07
14.	"En amour"	Marnay; Loigerot; Geoffroy	Marnay	3:19
Total length:				58:34

== Charts ==
Chart performance
Chart (1996)	Peak position
Belgian Albums (Ultratop Wallonia)	51

== Certifications ==
Certifications
Region	Certification	Certified units/sales
France (SNEP)	Gold	100,000^{*}
^{*} Sales figures based on certification alone.

== Release history ==
Release history
Region	Date	Label	Format	Catalog
France	2 October 1995	Versailles	CD	VER 481431 2
