= Celine Dion singles discography =

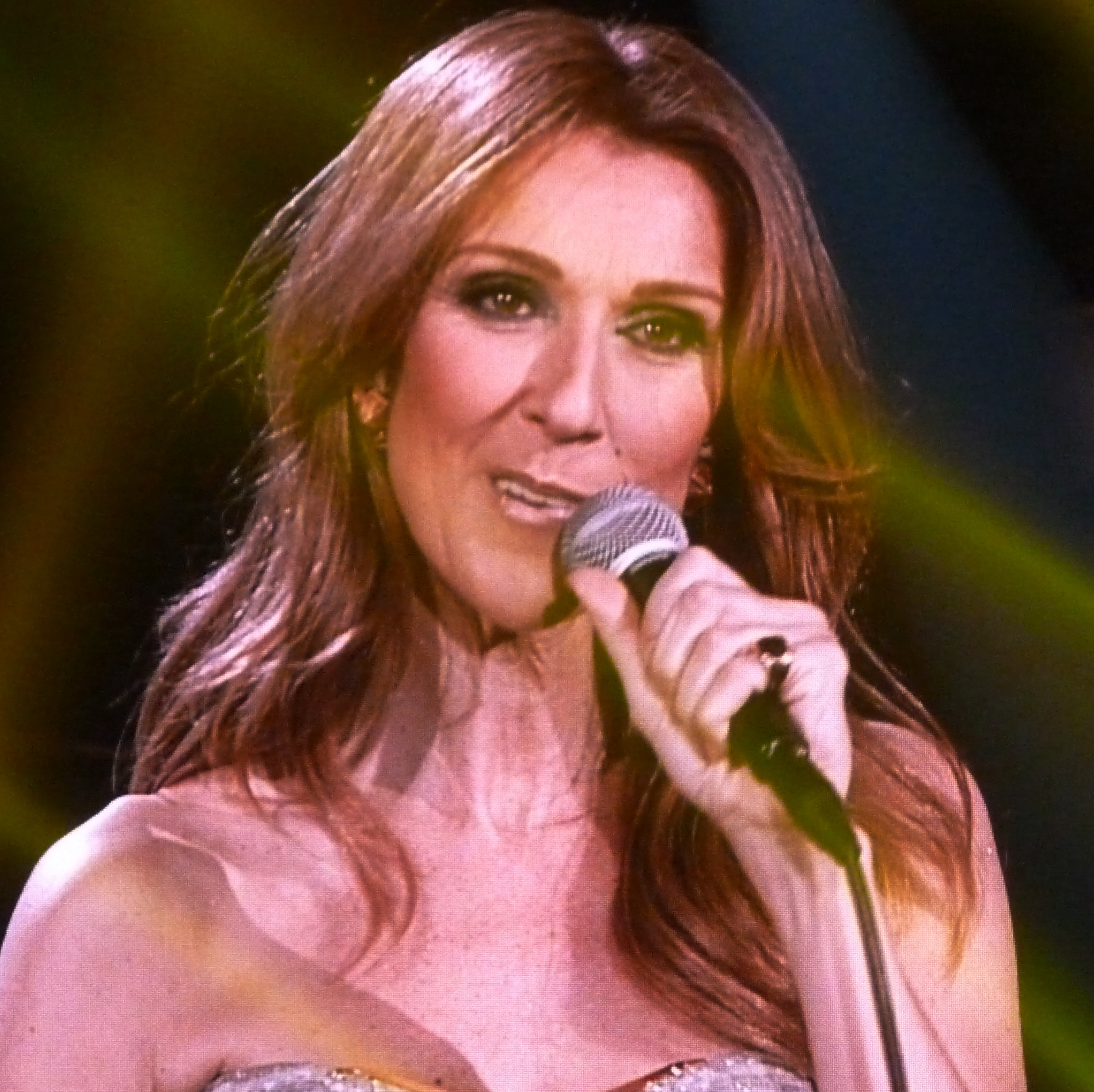
- Dion in 2013
- Singles: 115
- Promotional singles: 31

Canadian singer Celine Dion has released 115 singles in English and French as a lead artist, and 31 promotional singles. According to Billboard, she is the world's best-selling contemporary female artist of all time. As of 2021, she has reportedly sold around 200 to 250 million records worldwide. Often described as the "Queen of Power Ballads", she has released numerous international hits. Her most successful single, "My Heart Will Go On" (the love theme from the film Titanic), has estimated physical sales of over 18 million worldwide, making it the 2nd best-selling physical single by a woman in history. The song reached over 117 million radio impressions at its peak, became the best-selling single of 1998 worldwide, and remains one of the best-selling singles of all time. "Because You Loved Me" is her biggest hit on the US Billboard Hot 100, spending six weeks at number one and selling six million copies in its first six months of release worldwide. Her French-language signature hit, "Pour que tu m'aimes encore", was the 4th biggest hit of the 1990s in France and has sold over four million copies worldwide.

As of 2018, Billboard ranks Dion as the 25th Greatest Hot 100 Female Artist of all time. She also ranks as the 43rd Greatest Adult Pop Songs Artist of all time, and the 40th Greatest Pop Songs Artist of all time. Her single "Because You Loved Me" is the 45th Greatest Hot 100 Song by a woman in the United States. Dion placed seven songs on Billboard's list of Top Songs of the 90s, including "Because You Loved Me" (No. 27), "It's All Coming Back to Me Now" (No. 66), and "The Power of Love" (No. 67). She is also widely referred to as the "Queen of Adult Contemporary". Dion has achieved 11 number-one hits on the US Adult Contemporary chart, the most for any female recording artist, and has spent 87 weeks at the top of the chart, the highest total for any artist.

At age twelve, Dion collaborated with her mother and brother Jacques to compose her first song, "Ce n'était qu'un rêve", which was released as a single in Quebec, Canada on 11 June 1981. During the 1980s, she topped the Quebec chart with six singles, including "D'amour ou d'amitié", "Mon ami m'a quittée", and four tracks from the Incognito album (1987). In 1985, "Une colombe" received two Félix Awards for Song of the Year and Best Selling Single of the Year. Both "D'amour ou d'amitié" and "Une colombe" were certified gold in Canada. Elsewhere, "Tellement j'ai d'amour pour toi" won the Best Song Award at the World Popular Song Festival in Japan in 1982, and in 1983, Dion became the first Canadian artist to receive a gold record in France for "D'amour ou d'amitié". Her breakthrough in Europe continued when she represented Switzerland in the Eurovision Song Contest 1988 with the song "Ne partez pas sans moi", which went on to win the competition.

In 1990, Dion entered the American market with Unison. The album included "Where Does My Heart Beat Now", which became her first single to reach the top ten on the US Billboard Hot 100, peaking at number four. In 1991, she recorded "Beauty and the Beast" with Peabo Bryson. The song became her second top ten Billboard Hot 100 entry, her first top ten hit in the United Kingdom, and won the Academy Award for Best Original Song and the Grammy Award for Best Pop Performance by a Duo or Group with Vocals. Her next single from Celine Dion (1992), "If You Asked Me To", also peaked at number four on the Billboard Hot 100 and reached number one in Canada. Released in late 1993, The Colour of My Love produced Dion's first US and Australian, and second Canadian, number-one single, "The Power of Love". In the United States, the song was certified platinum and has sold 1.5 million copies. Another single from The Colour of My Love, "Think Twice", topped the UK Singles Chart for seven weeks and has sold over 1.3 million copies there. It became only the fourth million-selling single in the UK by a female artist. "Think Twice" also reached number one in several European countries, including Belgium, Denmark, Ireland, the Netherlands, Norway, and Sweden.

Keeping to her French roots, Dion continued to release French-language recordings between each English album. After Dion chante Plamondon in 1991, D'eux followed in 1995 and achieved major success with the single "Pour que tu m'aimes encore". The song reached number one in France and remained at the top for twelve weeks. "Pour que tu m'aimes encore" also topped charts in Francophone countries and entered the top ten in the UK, Ireland, the Netherlands, and Sweden. The next single, "Je sais pas", also reached number one in France and Belgium. In 1995, Dion released "To Love You More" in Japan, where it reached number one and sold 1.5 million copies. As a result, she became the first non-Japanese artist in twelve years to achieve a number-one hit on the Oricon Singles Chart.

Released in 1996, Falling into You included the US, Canadian, and Australian chart-topping single "Because You Loved Me", which has sold over two million copies in the US alone and remains Dion's biggest Billboard Hot 100 hit. Other successful singles from the album included "It's All Coming Back to Me Now" and "All by Myself", both of which reached the top five on the Billboard Hot 100. "It's All Coming Back to Me Now" became Dion's third platinum single in the US, with sales of 1.6 million copies. In 1997, she released the most successful single of her career, "My Heart Will Go On". Serving as the love theme to the 1997 blockbuster film Titanic (and also included on Let's Talk About Love), the single topped charts worldwide and became Dion's signature song. "My Heart Will Go On" won the Academy Award for Best Original Song and earned Dion two additional Grammy Awards: Best Female Pop Vocal Performance and Record of the Year. The single was certified diamond, multi-platinum, and gold in numerous countries. It remains Dion's highest-selling release and one of the best-selling singles of all time, with global sales exceeding 18 million, including two million in Germany, 1.8 million in the US, 1.5 million in the UK, and 1.2 million in France. With "Think Twice" and "My Heart Will Go On", Dion became the first female artist to achieve two million-selling singles in the UK. She is also among the biggest-selling female singles artists in UK chart history.

In 1998, Dion released another French-language album, S'il suffisait d'aimer, and her first English-language holiday album, These Are Special Times. The latter included "I'm Your Angel", a duet with R. Kelly, which became Dion's fourth Billboard Hot 100 number one and her fourth million-selling platinum single in the US. Released in 1999, All the Way... A Decade of Song included the successful lead single "That's the Way It Is", which reached number six on the Billboard Hot 100. After a two-year hiatus, Dion appeared on Garou's single "Sous le vent", which reached number one in Francophone countries and was certified diamond in France. In 2002, Dion released A New Day Has Come. The first single, the title track, peaked at number twenty-two on the Billboard Hot 100 and spent 21 consecutive weeks at number one on the Billboard Hot Adult Contemporary Tracks, breaking the record for the longest run at the top. The previous record holder was Dion's own "Because You Loved Me", which spent 19 weeks at number one. Dion has logged 87 weeks atop the Hot Adult Contemporary Tracks chart, the most for any artist. She has also achieved the most AC number ones—11—by a female artist. In 2007, the single "Taking Chances" gave Dion the record for the most top ten hits on the Hot Adult Contemporary Tracks chart, with 21 during the 1990s and 2000s. Dion also holds the record for the most AC entries (43) and the most number ones among all artists since her debut. Dion's latest entry on the US Adult Contemporary chart is "Imperfections", from her 2019 album Courage.

== Singles ==
=== 1980s ===
Title	Year	Peak chart positions									Certifications	Album
Title	Year	CAN	CAN AC	CAN QC	BEL	EU Airplay	EU Sales	FRA	NLD	SWI	Certifications	Album
"Ce n'était qu'un rêve"	1981	—	—	8	—	—	—	—	—	—		La voix du bon Dieu
"La voix du bon Dieu"	1981	—	—	11	—	—	—	—	—	—		La voix du bon Dieu
"L'amour viendra"	1982	—	—	—	—	—	—	—	—	—		La voix du bon Dieu
"Tellement j'ai d'amour pour toi"	1982	—	—	3	—	—	—	—	—	—		Tellement j'ai d'amour...
"D'amour ou d'amitié"	1982	—	—	1	—	—	—	5	—	—	CAN: Gold; FRA: Gold	Tellement j'ai d'amour...
"Mon ami m'a quittée"	1983	—	—	1	—	—	—	—	—	—		Les chemins de ma maison
"Un enfant"	1983	—	—	—	—	—	—	—	—	—		Chants et contes de Noël
"Ne me plaignez pas"	1984	—	—	11	—	—	—	—	—	—		Les chemins de ma maison
"Une colombe"	1984	—	—	2	—	—	—	—	—	—	CAN: Gold	Mélanie
"Mon rêve de toujours"	1984	—	—	4	—	—	—	—	—	—		Mélanie
"Un amour pour moi"	1985	—	—	12	—	—	—	—	—	—		Mélanie
"Vois comme c'est beau" (with Claudette Dion)	1985	—	—	14	—	—	—	—	—	—		Hymnes à l'amour, volume 2
"C'est pour toi"	1985	—	—	3	—	—	—	—	—	—		C'est pour toi
"C'est pour vivre"	1985	—	—	—	—	—	—	—	—	—		C'est pour toi
"Dans la main d'un magicien"	1985	—	—	—	—	—	—	—	—	—		Opération beurre de pinottes
"La ballade de Michel"	1985	—	—	—	—	—	—	—	—	—		Opération beurre de pinottes
"Billy"	1986	—	—	—	—	—	—	—	—	—		Non-album singles
"L'univers a besoin d'amour"	1986	—	—	—	—	—	—	—	—	—		Non-album singles
"Fais ce que tu voudras"	1986	—	—	36	—	—	—	—	—	—		Les chansons en or
"On traverse un miroir"	1987	—	—	2	—	—	—	—	—	—		Incognito
"Incognito"	1987	—	—	1	—	—	—	—	—	—		Incognito
"Je ne veux pas"	1987	—	—	—	—	—	—	—	—	—		Non-album single
"Lolita (trop jeune pour aimer)"	1987	—	—	1	—	—	—	—	—	—		Incognito
"Comme un cœur froid"	1988	—	—	1	—	—	—	—	—	—		Incognito
"La religieuse"	1988	—	—	—	—	—	—	—	—	—		The Best of Celine Dion
"Ne partez pas sans moi"	1988	—	—	10	1	46	49	36	42	11		The Best of Celine Dion
"Délivre-moi"	1988	—	—	4	—	—	—	—	—	—		Incognito
"Jours de fièvre"	1988	—	—	—	—	—	—	—	—	—		Incognito
"D'abord, c'est quoi l'amour"	1988	—	—	1	—	—	—	—	—	—		Incognito
"Can't Live with You, Can't Live Without You" (with Billy Newton-Davis)	1989	41	12	19	—	—	—	—	—	—		Spellbound
"—" denotes a title that did not chart, or was not released in that territory

=== 1990s ===
Title	Year	Peak chart positions										Certifications	Album
Title	Year	CAN	AUS	BEL	FRA	GER	NLD	SWI	UK	US	US AC	Certifications	Album
"(If There Was) Any Other Way"	1990	23	—	—	—	—	—	—	—	35	8		Unison
"Unison"	1990	38	—	—	—	—	—	—	—	—	—		Unison
"Where Does My Heart Beat Now"	1990	6	62	23	20	—	24	—	72	4	2		Unison
"The Last to Know"	1991	16	134	—	—	—	—	—	—	—	22		Unison
"Beauty and the Beast" (with Peabo Bryson)	1991	2	17	36	—	—	20	—	9	9	3	UK: Silver; US: Gold	Beauty and the Beast (Original Motion Picture Soundtrack)
"Je danse dans ma tête"	1992	— (Note: "Je danse dans ma tête" did not enter the Canadian Singles Chart, but peaked at number 3 in Quebec.)	—	—	—	—	—	—	—	—	—		Dion chante Plamondon
"If You Asked Me To"	1992	1	52	—	—	—	28	—	57	4	1		Celine Dion
"Nothing Broken but My Heart"	1992	3	192	—	—	—	—	—	—	29	1		Celine Dion
"Love Can Move Mountains"	1992	2	54	—	—	61	—	—	46	36	8		Celine Dion
"Water from the Moon"	1993	7	—	—	—	—	—	—	—	—	11		Celine Dion
"Un garçon pas comme les autres (Ziggy)"	1993	—	—	—	2	—	—	—	—	—	—	FRA: Gold	Dion chante Plamondon
"When I Fall in Love" (with Clive Griffin)	1993	21	93	—	—	—	37	—	—	23	6		Sleepless in Seattle (Original Motion Picture Soundtrack)
"The Power of Love"	1993	1	1	5	3	57	22	—	4	1	1	CAN: 2× Platinum; AUS: Platinum; FRA: Gold; UK: Platinum; US: Platinum	The Colour of My Love
"L'amour existe encore"	1994	— (Note: "L'amour existe encore" did not enter the Canadian Singles Chart, but peaked at number 16 in Quebec.)	—	—	31	—	—	—	—	—	—		Dion chante Plamondon
"Misled"	1994	4	55	—	—	83	—	—	15	23	15		The Colour of My Love
"Think Twice"	1994	13	2	1	—	19	1	6	1	95	21	AUS: Platinum; BEL: Gold; UK: Platinum	The Colour of My Love
"Only One Road"	1994	15	23	17	—	—	40	—	8	93	27		The Colour of My Love
"Calling You"	1994	—	—	—	75	—	—	—	—	—	—		À l'Olympia
"Pour que tu m'aimes encore"	1995	— (Note: "Pour que tu m'aimes encore" did not enter the Canadian Singles Chart, but peaked at number 1 in Quebec.)	—	1	1	39	4	17	7	—	—	CAN: Platinum; BEL: Platinum; FRA: Platinum; UK: Silver	D'eux
"Je sais pas"	1995	— (Note: "Je sais pas" did not enter the Canadian Singles Chart, but peaked at number 1 in Quebec.)	—	1	1	—	34	—	—	—	—	BEL: Gold; FRA: Gold	D'eux
"Next Plane Out"	1995	—	61	—	—	—	—	—	—	—	—		The Colour of My Love
"To Love You More"	1995	9	—	—	—	—	—	—	—	— (Note: "To Love You More" did not enter the Billboard Hot 100, but peaked at number 11 on the Radio Songs chart.)	1		The Colour of My Love Japanese re-release
"Falling into You"	1996	—	12	11	11	71	18	19	10	—	—	UK: Silver	Falling into You
"Because You Loved Me"	1996	1	1	5	19	13	4	3	5	1	1	CAN: 3× Platinum; AUS: 2× Platinum; GER: Gold; UK: 2× Platinum; US: 2× Platinum	Falling into You
"It's All Coming Back to Me Now"	1996	1	8	1	13	62	5	—	3	2	1	CAN: 3× Platinum; AUS: Gold; BEL: Gold; UK: 2× Platinum; US: 2× Platinum	Falling into You
"The Power of the Dream"	1996	— (Note: "The Power of the Dream" did not enter the Canadian Singles Chart, but peaked at number 3 in Quebec.)	—	—	—	—	—	—	—	—	—		The Collector's Series, Volume One
"All by Myself"	1996	7	38	7	5	55	20	36	6	4	1	CAN: Platinum; FRA: Silver; UK: Gold; US: Gold	Falling into You
"Je sais pas" (live)	1997	—	—	—	—	—	78	—	—	—	—		Live à Paris
"Call the Man"	1997	—	—	26	—	—	69	—	11	—	—		Falling into You
"J'attendais"	1997	—	—	22	46	—	—	—	—	—	—		Live à Paris
"Tell Him" (with Barbra Streisand)	1997	12	9	3	4	25	2	4	3	— (Note: "Tell Him" did not enter the Billboard Hot 100, but peaked at number 58 on the Radio Songs chart.)	5	CAN: Gold; AUS: Platinum; BEL: Platinum; FRA: Gold; SWI: Gold; UK: Gold	Let's Talk About Love
"Be the Man"	1997	—	—	—	—	—	—	—	—	—	—		Let's Talk About Love
"The Reason"	1997	—	—	59	1	—	—	—	11	—	—	FRA: Diamond; UK: Silver	Let's Talk About Love
"My Heart Will Go On"	1997	1	1	1	1	1	1	1	1	1	1	CAN: 4× Platinum; AUS: 2× Platinum; BEL: 3× Platinum; FRA: Diamond; GER: 4× Platinum; SWI: 2× Platinum; UK: 4× Platinum; US: 4× Platinum	Let's Talk About Love
"Immortality" (with the Bee Gees)	1998	28	38	15	15	2	41	8	5	—	—	CAN: Gold; FRA: Gold; GER: Platinum; UK: Gold	Let's Talk About Love
"Zora sourit"	1998	— (Note: "Zora sourit" did not enter the Canadian Singles Chart, but peaked at number 1 in Quebec.)	—	12	20	—	67	25	—	—	—	BEL: Gold; FRA: Gold	S'il suffisait d'aimer
"I'm Your Angel" (with R. Kelly)	1998	11	31	26	97	14	9	7	3	1	1	AUS: Gold; UK: Silver; US: Platinum	These Are Special Times
"S'il suffisait d'aimer"	1998	— (Note: "S'il suffisait d'aimer" did not enter the Canadian Singles Chart, but peaked at number 5 in Quebec.)	—	6	4	—	—	—	—	—	—	CAN: Gold; BEL: Gold; FRA: Gold	S'il suffisait d'aimer
"On ne change pas"	1999	— (Note: "On ne change pas" did not enter the Canadian Singles Chart, but peaked at number 1 in Quebec.)	—	16	17	—	—	—	—	—	—	CAN: Gold	S'il suffisait d'aimer
"Treat Her Like a Lady"	1999	— (Note: "Treat Her Like a Lady" did not enter the Canadian Singles Chart, but peaked at number 9 in Quebec.)	—	70	—	64	62	—	29	—	—		Let's Talk About Love
"That's the Way It Is"	1999	5	14	7	6	8	7	5	12	6	1	AUS: Gold; BEL: Gold; FRA: Gold; GER: Gold; UK: Gold	All the Way... A Decade of Song
"—" denotes a title that did not chart, or was not released in that territory

=== 2000s ===
Title	Year	Peak chart positions										Certifications	Album
Title	Year	CAN	AUS	BEL	FRA	GER	NLD	SWI	UK	US	US AC	Certifications	Album
"Live (for the One I Love)"	2000	23	—	47	63	—	89	82	—	—	—		All the Way... A Decade of Song
"The First Time Ever I Saw Your Face"	2000	—	—	—	—	—	—	—	19	—	—		All the Way... A Decade of Song
"I Want You to Need Me"	2000	1	—	73	—	—	49	40	—	—	12		All the Way... A Decade of Song
"Sous le vent" (with Garou)	2001	14	—	1	1	—	78	2	—	—	—	BEL: Platinum; FRA: Diamond; SWI: Platinum	Seul
"A New Day Has Come"	2002	2	19	13	23	6	21	2	7	22	1	CAN: Platinum; AUS: Gold; UK: Gold; US: Gold	A New Day Has Come
"I'm Alive"	2002	21	30	2	7	4	7	7	17	— (Note: "I'm Alive" did not enter the Billboard Hot 100, but peaked at number 11 on the Bubbling Under Hot 100 Singles chart.)	6	CAN: 2× Platinum; BEL: Platinum; FRA: Gold; GER: Gold; UK: Platinum	A New Day Has Come
"Goodbye's (The Saddest Word)"	2002	67	—	36	—	56	38	35	38	—	27		A New Day Has Come
"I Drove All Night"	2003	1	22	1	22	22	24	11	27	45	7	CAN: Platinum; AUS: Gold; BEL: Gold; UK: Silver	One Heart
"One Heart"	2003	59	75	37	63	56	78	36	27	—	—		One Heart
"Tout l'or des hommes"	2003	2	—	5	3	77	100	10	—	—	—	FRA: Gold	1 fille & 4 types
"Have You Ever Been in Love"	2003	— (Note: "Have You Ever Been in Love" did not enter the Canadian Singles Chart, but peaked at number 3 on the Canadian Adult Contemporary Chart.)	—	—	—	—	—	—	—	— (Note: "Have You Ever Been in Love" did not enter the Billboard Hot 100, but peaked at number 4 on the Bubbling Under Hot 100 Singles chart.)	2		One Heart
"Et je t'aime encore"	2004	— (Note: "Et je t'aime encore" did not enter the Canadian Singles Chart, but peaked at number 2 in Quebec.)	—	14	16	—	—	31	—	—	—		1 fille & 4 types
"Je ne vous oublie pas"	2005	— (Note: "Je ne vous oublie pas" did not enter the Canadian Singles Chart, but peaked at number 2 in Quebec.)	—	4	2	—	—	21	—	—	—	FRA: Gold	On ne change pas
"Tous les secrets"	2006	— (Note: "Tous les secrets" did not enter the Canadian Singles Chart, but peaked at number 7 in Quebec.)	—	33	20	—	—	75	—	—	—		On ne change pas
"Tout près du bonheur" (with Marc Dupré)	2006	— (Note: "Tout près du bonheur" did not enter the Canadian Singles Chart, but peaked at number 1 in Quebec.)	—	—	—	—	—	—	—	—	—		Refaire le monde
"I Believe in You (Je crois en toi)" (with Il Divo)	2006	— (Note: "I Believe in You (Je crois en toi)" did not enter the Canadian Singles Chart, but peaked at number 29 in Quebec.)	—	—	30	—	—	35	—	—	31		On ne change pas
"Et s'il n'en restait qu'une (je serais celle-là)"	2007	— (Note: "Et s'il n'en restait qu'une (je serais celle-là)" did not enter the Canadian Singles Chart, but peaked at number 2 in Quebec.)	—	4	1	—	—	34	—	—	—		D'elles
"Immensité"	2007	— (Note: "Immensité" did not enter the Canadian Singles Chart, but peaked at number 7 in Quebec.)	—	— (Note: "Immensité" did not enter the Ultratop 50 Singles, but peaked at number 6 on the Ultratip chart.)	—	—	—	—	—	—	—		D'elles
"Taking Chances"	2007	9	60	29	7	25	100	5	40	54	6	CAN: Gold	Taking Chances
"Eyes on Me"	2008	—	—	—	—	—	—	—	113	—	—		Taking Chances
"A World to Believe In" (with Yuna Ito)	2008	—	—	—	—	—	—	—	—	—	—		Taking Chances
"The Prayer" (with Josh Groban)	2008	37	—	—	—	—	—	—	—	70	—		Non-album single
"Alone"	2008	57	—	—	—	—	—	—	85	— (Note: "Alone" did not enter the Billboard Hot 100, but peaked at number 24 on the Bubbling Under Hot 100 Singles chart.)	—	CAN: Gold	Taking Chances
"My Love"	2008	67	—	— (Note: "My Love" did not enter the Ultratop 50 Singles, but peaked at number 19 on the Ultratip chart.)	—	—	—	—	129	—	15		My Love: Essential Collection
"—" denotes a title that did not chart, or was not released in that territory

=== 2010s ===
Title	Year	Peak chart positions										Certifications	Album
Title	Year	CAN	CAN AC	AUS	BEL	FRA	GER	SWI	UK	US Bub.	US AC	Certifications	Album
"Parler à mon père"	2012	53	29	—	11	8	—	25	—	—	—	CAN: Gold	Sans attendre
"Le miracle"	2012	—	21	—	27	77	—	—	—	—	—		Sans attendre
"Qui peut vivre sans amour?"	2013	—	41	—	— (Note: "Qui peut vivre sans amour?" did not enter the Ultratop 50 Singles, but peaked at number 12 on the Ultratip chart.)	—	—	—	—	—	—		Sans attendre
"Loved Me Back to Life"	2013	26	39	—	25	32	38	25	14	—	24	CAN: Gold	Loved Me Back to Life
"Incredible" (with Ne-Yo)	2014	44	24	—	—	—	—	—	—	—	25		Loved Me Back to Life
"The Show Must Go On" (featuring Lindsey Stirling)	2016	89	—	—	— (Note: "The Show Must Go On" did not enter the Ultratop 50 Singles, but peaked at number 47 on the Ultratip chart.)	23	—	—	—	—	—		Non-album single
"Encore un soir"	2016	92	39	—	10	1	—	25	—	—	—	CAN: Gold; FRA: Diamond; SWI: Gold	Encore un soir
"Recovering"	2016	— (Note: "Recovering" did not enter the Canadian Hot 100, but peaked at number 16 on the Hot Canadian Digital Songs chart.)	—	—	—	50	—	—	—	—	—		Non-album single
"L'étoile"	2016	—	35	—	— (Note: "L'étoile" did not enter the Ultratop 50 Singles, but peaked at number 6 on the Ultratip chart.)	191	—	—	—	—	—		Encore un soir
"Si c'était à refaire"	2016	—	—	—	— (Note: "Si c'était à refaire" did not enter the Ultratop 50 Singles, but peaked at number 43 on the Ultratip chart.)	100	—	—	—	—	—		Encore un soir
"Je nous veux"	2017	—	38	—	—	143	—	—	—	—	—		Encore un soir
"Les yeux au ciel"	2017	—	43	—	—	169	—	—	—	—	—		Encore un soir
"Ashes"	2018	72	41	94	— (Note: "Ashes" did not enter the Ultratop 50 Singles, but peaked at number 16 on the Ultratip chart.)	15	—	65	86	17	22	CAN: Platinum; FRA: Gold; UK: Silver	Deadpool 2 (Original Motion Picture Soundtrack)
"Imperfections"	2019	69	5	—	17	— (Note: "Imperfections" did not enter the Top Singles (Downloads+Streaming), but peaked at number 43 on the Sales chart.)	—	—	—	—	11	CAN: Gold	Courage
"Lying Down"	2019	— (Note: "Lying Down" did not enter the Canadian Hot 100, but peaked at number 32 on the Hot Canadian Digital Songs chart.)	—	—	—	— (Note: "Lying Down" did not enter the Top Singles (Downloads+Streaming), but peaked at number 42 on the Downloads chart.)	—	—	— (Note: "Lying Down" did not enter the UK Singles Chart, but peaked at number 74 on the UK Singles Downloads Chart.)	—	—		Courage
"Courage"	2019	— (Note: "Courage" did not enter the Canadian Hot 100, but peaked at number 20 on the Hot Canadian Digital Songs chart.)	—	—	—	— (Note: "Courage" did not enter the Top Singles (Downloads+Streaming), but peaked at number 46 on the Downloads chart.)	—	—	—	—	—		Courage
"—" denotes a title that did not chart, or was not released in that territory

=== 2020s ===
Title	Year	Peak chart positions										Certifications	Album
Title	Year	CAN	CAN QC	BEL	FRA	IRE	SWE	SWI	UK	UK Dance	US Dance Sales	Certifications	Album
"Set My Heart on Fire (I'm Alive x And the Beat Goes On)" (with Majestic and the Jammin Kid)	2024	—	1	—	—	92	—	—	39	7	5	UK: Silver	Non-album singles
"Hymne à l'amour"	2024	— (Note: "Hymne à l'amour" did not enter the Canadian Hot 100, but peaked at number four on the Canadian Digital Song Sales chart.)	1	—	65	—	—	—	— (Note: "Hymne à l'amour" did not enter the UK Singles Chart Top 100, but peaked at number 22 on the UK Singles Downloads Chart.)	—	—	FRA: Gold	Non-album singles
"A New Day" (with Sebastian Ingrosso)	2025	— (Note: "A New Day" did not enter the Canadian Hot 100, but peaked at number 23 on the Canadian Digital Song Sales chart.)	1	—	—	—	71	—	— (Note: "A New Day" did not enter the UK Singles Chart Top 100, but peaked at number 21 on the UK Singles Downloads Chart.)	—	6		Non-album singles
"Dansons"	2026	68	1	3	25	—	—	53	— (Note: "Dansons" did not enter the UK Singles Chart Top 100, but peaked at number 57 on the UK Singles Downloads Chart.)	—	—		Non-album singles
"Bonjour, pardon, merci"	2026	— (Note: "Bonjour, pardon, merci" did not enter the Canadian Hot 100, but peaked at number five on the Canadian Digital Song Sales chart.)	1	38	126	—	—	—	— (Note: "Bonjour, pardon, merci" did not enter the UK Singles Chart Top 100, but peaked at number 70 on the UK Singles Downloads Chart.)	—	—		Non-album singles
"—" denotes a title that did not chart, or was not released in that territory

== Promotional singles ==
Title	Year	Peak chart positions										Album
Title	Year	CAN	CAN AC	CAN QC	BEL	BEL Air.	FRA	FRA Air.	UK Dig.	US AC	US Dance	Album
"Have a Heart"	1991	26	4	3	—	—	—	—	—	—	—	Unison
"Des mots qui sonnent"	1991	—	—	10	—	—	—	—	—	—	—	Dion chante Plamondon
"Quelqu'un que j'aime, quelqu'un qui m'aime"	1992	—	—	1	—	—	—	—	—	—	—	Dion chante Plamondon
"Did You Give Enough Love"	1993	17	23	25	—	—	—	—	—	—	—	Celine Dion
"Plus haut que moi" (with Mario Pelchat)	1993	—	—	6	—	—	—	—	—	—	—	Pelchat
"(You Make Me Feel Like) A Natural Woman"	1995	47	4	—	—	—	—	—	—	31	—	Tapestry Revisited
"Le ballet"	1996	—	—	—	—	—	—	1	—	—	—	D'eux
"Les derniers seront les premiers"	1996	—	—	3	—	47	—	19	—	—	—	Live à Paris
"A Natural Woman" (with the Divas)	1998	—	—	—	—	9	—	—	—	—	—	VH1 Divas Live
"You've Got a Friend" (with the Divas)	1998	—	—	—	—	74	—	—	—	—	—	VH1 Divas Live
"It's Hard to Say Goodbye" (with Paul Anka)	1999	—	—	—	—	—	—	—	—	—	—	A Body of Work
"The Prayer" (with Andrea Bocelli)	1999	—	6	18	—	34	—	—	67	22	—	These Are Special Times
"En attendant ses pas"	1999	—	—	1	—	10	—	6	—	—	—	S'il suffisait d'aimer
"God Bless America"	2001	—	—	—	—	74	—	—	—	14	—	God Bless America
"At Last"	2002	—	—	—	—	—	—	—	—	16	—	A New Day Has Come
"Stand by Your Side"	2003	—	—	—	—	—	—	—	—	17	—	One Heart
"Faith"	2003	—	37	4	—	—	—	—	—	—	—	One Heart
"Contre nature"	2004	—	—	2	—	38	—	—	—	—	—	1 fille & 4 types
"You and I"	2004	—	1	2	—	30	—	—	—	16	—	A New Day... Live in Las Vegas
"Beautiful Boy"	2004	—	23	2	—	—	—	—	—	18	—	Miracle
"Je lui dirai"	2004	—	—	—	—	22	—	—	—	—	—	Miracle
"Ma Nouvelle-France"	2004	—	—	7	—	—	—	—	—	—	—	Nouvelle-France
"In Some Small Way"	2005	—	14	9	—	—	—	—	—	28	—	Miracle
"Voler" (with Michel Sardou)	2010	—	—	—	48	—	—	—	—	—	—	Être une femme 2010
"Breakaway"	2013	—	—	—	—	—	—	—	— (Note: "Breakaway" did not enter the UK Digital Chart, but peaked at number 38 on the UK Radio Airplay Chart.)	—	—	Loved Me Back to life
"Water and a Flame"	2014	—	—	—	—	—	—	—	— (Note: "Water and a Flame" did not enter the UK Digital Chart, but peaked at number 30 on the UK Radio Airplay Chart.)	—	—	Loved Me Back to life
"Celle qui m'a tout appris"	2014	—	—	27	— (Note: "Celle qui m'a tout appris" did not enter the Ultratop 50 Singles, but peaked at number 6 on the Ultratip chart.)	—	—	—	—	—	—	Céline une seule fois / Live 2013
"L'hymne" (with Fred Pellerin)	2015	—	42	—	—	—	—	—	—	—	—	La guerre des tuques 3D
"Flying on My Own"	2019	— (Note: "Flying on My Own" did not enter the Canadian Hot 100, but peaked at number 9 on the Hot Canadian Digital Songs chart.)	—	1	— (Note: "Flying on My Own" did not enter the Ultratop 50 Singles, but peaked at number 28 on the Ultratip chart.)	—	— (Note: "Flying on My Own" did not enter the Top Singles (Downloads+Streaming), but peaked at number 8 on the Downloads chart.)	—	99	—	7	Courage
"Love Again"	2023	— (Note: "Love Again" did not enter the Canadian Hot 100, but peaked at number 10 on the Hot Canadian Digital Songs chart.)	—	1	—	—	—	—	86	—	—	Love Again (Soundtrack from the Motion Picture)
"I'll Be"	2023	— (Note: "I'll Be" did not enter the Canadian Hot 100, but peaked at number 25 on the Hot Canadian Digital Songs chart.)	—	2	—	—	—	—	—	—	—	Love Again (Soundtrack from the Motion Picture)
"—" denotes a title that did not chart, or was not released in that territory

== Charity singles by supergroups ==
Title	Year	Peak chart positions										Certifications	Album
Title	Year	CAN	CAN Dig.	CAN QC	AUS	BEL	NOR	UK	US	US AC	US Dance	Certifications	Album
"Les Yeux de la faim"	1985	—	—	1	—	—	—	—	—	—	—	CAN: Gold	Non-album singles
"Voices That Care"	1991	61	—	25	—	—	—	—	11	6	—	US: Platinum	Non-album singles
"What More Can I Give"	2001	—	—	—	—	—	—	—	—	—	—		Non-album singles
"Come Together Now"	2005	—	—	—	—	—	—	—	—	39	—		Hurricane Relief: Come Together Now
"Sing"	2007	—	—	—	—	—	—	161	—	29	18		Songs of Mass Destruction
"We Are the World 25 for Haiti"	2010	7	3	—	18	1	1	50	2	—	—		Non-album singles
"Tu trouveras la paix"	2019	51	1	1	—	—	—	—	—	—	—		Non-album singles
"Une chance qu'on s'a"	2020	—	34	2	—	—	—	—	—	—	—		Non-album singles
"—" denotes a title that did not chart, or was not released in that territory

== Other charted songs ==
Title	Year	Peak chart positions										Certifications	Album
Title	Year	CAN	CAN QC	DEN	FRA	IRE	ITA	SWE	UK	US AC	US Holiday	Certifications	Album
"Ma chambre"	1987	—	38	—	—	—	—	—	—	—	—		Incognito
"Refuse to Dance"	1995	—	41	—	—	—	—	—	—	—	—		The Colour of My Love
"Destin"	1996	—	3	—	179	—	—	—	—	—	—		D'eux
"J'irai où tu iras" (with Jean-Jacques Goldman)	1996	—	14	—	39	—	—	—	—	—	—		D'eux
"Send Me a Lover"	1996	—	—	—	—	—	—	—	—	23	—		Power of Peace
"Miles to Go (Before I Sleep)"	1998	— (Note: "Miles to Go (Before I Sleep)" did not enter the Canadian Singles Chart, but peaked at number 17 on the Canadian Adult Contemporary Chart.)	—	—	—	—	—	—	—	—	—		Let's Talk About Love
"Terre"	1998	—	8	—	—	—	—	—	—	—	—		S'il suffisait d'aimer
"Dans un autre monde"	1999	—	49	—	117	—	—	—	—	—	—		Au cœur du stade
"Happy Xmas (War Is Over)"	2006	—	—	—	—	—	32	30	—	—	32	DEN: Gold; ITA: Gold; UK: Silver	These Are Special Times
"On s'est aimé à cause"	2007	— (Note: "On s'est aimé à cause" did not enter the Canadian Singles Chart, but peaked at number 23 on the Canadian Adult Contemporary Chart.)	3	—	—	—	—	—	—	—	—		D'elles
"Right Next to the Right One"	2007	—	—	13	—	—	—	—	—	—	—		Taking Chances
"Shadow of Love" (Note: "Shadow of Love" peaked at number 23 on the Belgian Ultratip Chart.)	2008	—	—	—	—	—	—	—	—	—	—		Taking Chances
"L'amour existe encore" (with Éric Lapointe)	2009	— (Note: "L'amour existe encore" did not enter the Canadian Singles Chart, but peaked at number 34 on the Canadian Adult Contemporary Chart.)	8	—	—	—	—	—	—	—	—		Ailleurs - Volume 1
"Les petits pieds de Léa"	2012	80	—	—	—	—	—	—	—	—	—		Sans attendre
"Vole"	2013	—	8	—	67	—	—	—	—	—	—		D'eux
"Somebody Loves Somebody"	2013	— (Note: "Somebody Loves Somebody" did not enter the Canadian Hot 100, but peaked at number 67 on the Hot Canadian Digital Songs chart.)	—	—	—	—	—	—	—	—	—		Loved Me Back to Life
"O Holy Night"	2013	— (Note: "O Holy Night" did not enter the Canadian Hot 100, but peaked at number 36 on the Hot Canadian Digital Songs chart.)	1	—	—	46	—	—	62	—	44	CAN: Platinum	These Are Special Times
"Trois heures vingt"	2016	—	1	—	73	—	—	—	—	—	—		Encore un soir
"Ordinaire"	2016	—	2	—	83	—	—	—	—	—	—		Encore un soir
"Toutes ces choses"	2016	—	6	—	85	—	—	—	—	—	—		Encore un soir
"À la plus haute branche"	2016	—	3	—	150	—	—	—	—	—	—		Encore un soir
"Ma faille"	2016	—	—	—	155	—	—	—	—	—	—		Encore un soir
"Ma force"	2016	—	—	—	185	—	—	—	—	—	—		Encore un soir
"Ave Maria"	2016	—	—	—	—	—	—	—	—	—	— (Note: "Ave Maria" did not enter the Holiday Hot 100, but peaked at number 43 on the Holiday Digital Songs.)		These Are Special Times
"I Surrender"	2017	—	1	—	—	—	—	—	—	—	—		A New Day Has Come
"How Does a Moment Last Forever"	2017	—	1	—	125	—	—	—	— (Note: "How Does a Moment Last Forever" did not enter the UK Singles Chart, but peaked at number 94 on the UK Singles Downloads Chart.)	—	—		Beauty and the Beast (Original Motion Picture Soundtrack)
"Christmas Eve"	2017	—	—	—	—	—	—	—	—	—	— (Note: "Christmas Eve" did not enter the Holiday Hot 100, but peaked at number 39 on the Holiday Streaming Songs.)		These Are Special Times
"Don't Save It All for Christmas Day"	2017	—	—	—	—	—	—	—	—	—	81		These Are Special Times
"The Christmas Song"	2017	—	—	—	—	—	—	—	—	—	94		These Are Special Times
"Lovers Never Die"	2019	—	2	—	—	—	—	—	—	—	—		Courage
"Falling in Love Again"	2019	—	3	—	—	—	—	—	—	—	—		Courage
"Heart of Glass"	2019	—	—	—	— (Note: "Heart of Glass" did not enter the Top Singles (Downloads+Streaming), but peaked at number 192 on the Sales chart.)	—	—	—	—	—	—		Courage
"Quand on n'a que l'amour" (with Maurane)	2019	—	—	—	— (Note: "Quand on n'a que l'amour" did not enter the Top Singles (Downloads+Streaming), but peaked at number 186 on the Sales chart.)	—	—	—	—	—	—		La soirée des Enfoirés 96
"Soul"	2020	—	3	—	— (Note: "Soul" did not enter the Top Singles (Downloads+Streaming), but peaked at number 119 on the Sales chart.)	—	—	—	—	—	—		Courage
"I Met an Angel (On Christmas Day)" (Note: "I Met an Angel (On Christmas Day)" peaked at number 71 on the Finnish Radio Chart.)	2020	—	—	—	—	—	—	—	—	—	—		These Are Special Times
"The Gift"	2023	—	2	—	—	—	—	—	—	—	—		Love Again (Soundtrack from the Motion Picture)
"River Deep, Mountain High"	2024	—	3	—	—	—	—	—	—	—	—		Falling into You
"I Love You" (Note: "I Love You" peaked at number 42 on the Philippines Hot 100 chart.)	2024	—	—	—	—	—	—	—	—	—	—		Falling into You
"Prière païenne"	2026	—	—	—	123	—	—	—	—	—	—		D'eux
"—" denotes a title that did not chart, or was not released in that territory

== See also ==
- Celine Dion albums discography
- Celine Dion videography
- List of best-selling music artists
