= Incognito Tour =

1988–1989 concert tour by Celine Dion

- Tour by Celine Dion
- Promotional poster for the tour
- Location: Canada
- Associated album: Incognito
- Start date: 11 January 1988
- End date: 11 July 1989
- No. of shows: 84

Celine Dion concert chronology
- Céline Dion en concert (1985); Incognito Tour (1988–1989); Unison Tour (1990–1991)

The Incognito Tour was the third concert tour by Canadian singer Celine Dion, launched to promote her eighth studio album, Incognito (1987). The tour began on 11 January 1988 in Rouyn-Noranda, Canada, and concluded on 11 July 1989 in Quebec City. It included more than 80 performances across 27 cities in the provinces of Quebec and Ontario.

== History ==
The tour initially focused on venues across Quebec, opening on 11 January 1988 at the Théâtre du Cuivre in Rouyn-Noranda. Dion performed several shows in northern Quebec and in Laval. Dion also gave 42 consecutive shows at the Théâtre Saint-Denis in Montreal across several periods in 1988: 10 February–10 March, 12–17 April, 14–19 June, 21–24 September, and 14–18 December.

Her set included songs from Incognito, a medley from the musical Starmania, a cover of "Ton visage" by Jean-Pierre Ferland, and a segment in which she imitated artists such as Michael Jackson, Mireille Mathieu, Ginette Reno, and Diane Dufresne. During the tour, Dion experienced her first significant vocal strain.

On 2 May 1989, one year after winning the Eurovision Song Contest with "Ne partez pas sans moi", Dion gave a special concert at the Théâtre de Beaulieu in Lausanne, Switzerland, held outside the regular tour schedule.

== Set list ==
The following set list is taken from the official tour brochure and does not represent all concerts.

1. "Délivre-moi"
2. "Incognito"
3. "That's What Friends Are For"
4. "On traverse un miroir"
5. "Somewhere"
6. "The Way We Were"
7. "Summertime"
8. Imitations segment
9. "I'm So Excited"
10. "Lolita (trop jeune pour aimer)"
11. "D'abord, c'est quoi l'amour"
12. "Mes blues passent pu dans port"
13. "Ton visage"
14. "Quand on arrive en ville"
15. "Les uns contre les autres"
16. "Le monde est stone"
17. "Ce soir on danse à Naziland"
18. "Le blues du businessman"

== Notes ==
- During the imitations segment, Dion portrayed several artists, including Michael Jackson ("Bad"), Mireille Mathieu ("Santa Maria de la mer"), Ginette Reno ("Je ne suis qu'une chanson"), and Diane Dufresne ("Les hauts et les bas d'une hôtesse de l'air").
- At the 11 July 1989 concert in Quebec City, Dion also performed "Comme un cœur froid", "L'amour est un oiseau rebelle", "Love by Another Name", and "Ne partez pas sans moi".

== Tour dates ==
List of 1988 shows
Date (1988)	City	Country	Venue
11 January	Rouyn-Noranda	Canada	Théâtre du Cuivre
12 January	Rouyn-Noranda	Canada	Théâtre du Cuivre
13 January	Rouyn-Noranda	Canada	Théâtre du Cuivre
20 January	Quebec City	Canada	Palais Montcalm
21 January	Quebec City	Canada	Palais Montcalm
22 January	Quebec City	Canada	Palais Montcalm
23 January	Quebec City	Canada	Palais Montcalm
9 February	Montreal	Canada	Théâtre Saint-Denis
10 February	Montreal	Canada	Théâtre Saint-Denis
11 February	Montreal	Canada	Théâtre Saint-Denis
12 February	Montreal	Canada	Théâtre Saint-Denis
13 February	Montreal	Canada	Théâtre Saint-Denis
14 February	Montreal	Canada	Théâtre Saint-Denis
18 February	Montreal	Canada	Théâtre Saint-Denis
19 February	Montreal	Canada	Théâtre Saint-Denis
20 February	Montreal	Canada	Théâtre Saint-Denis
25 February	Quebec City	Canada	Palais Montcalm
26 February	Quebec City	Canada	Palais Montcalm
27 February	Quebec City	Canada	Palais Montcalm
28 February	Quebec City	Canada	Palais Montcalm
12 April	Montreal	Canada	Théâtre Saint-Denis
13 April	Montreal	Canada	Théâtre Saint-Denis
14 April	Montreal	Canada	Théâtre Saint-Denis
15 April	Montreal	Canada	Théâtre Saint-Denis
16 April	Montreal	Canada	Théâtre Saint-Denis
17 April	Montreal	Canada	Théâtre Saint-Denis
24 May	Longueuil	Canada	Cégep Édouard-Montpetit
25 May	Quebec City	Canada	Palais Montcalm
26 May	Quebec City	Canada	Palais Montcalm
27 May	Quebec City	Canada	Palais Montcalm
28 May	Quebec City	Canada	Palais Montcalm
1 June	Ottawa	Canada	National Arts Centre
2 June	Ottawa	Canada	National Arts Centre
3 June	Maniwaki	Canada	
14 June	Montreal	Canada	Théâtre Saint-Denis
15 June	Montreal	Canada	Théâtre Saint-Denis
16 June	Montreal	Canada	Théâtre Saint-Denis
17 June	Montreal	Canada	Théâtre Saint-Denis
18 June	Montreal	Canada	Théâtre Saint-Denis
19 June	Montreal	Canada	Théâtre Saint-Denis
4 August	Sainte-Agathe-des-Monts	Canada	Sainte-Agathe en Feux Festival
9 August	Matane	Canada	Centre Sportif de Matane
17 August	Ottawa	Canada	National Arts Centre
21 September	Montreal	Canada	Théâtre Saint-Denis
22 September	Montreal	Canada	Théâtre Saint-Denis
23 September	Montreal	Canada	Théâtre Saint-Denis
24 September	Montreal	Canada	Théâtre Saint-Denis
4 October	Sherbrooke	Canada	Centre culturel de l'Université de Sherbrooke
5 October	Sherbrooke	Canada	Centre culturel de l'Université de Sherbrooke
6 October	Sherbrooke	Canada	Centre culturel de l'Université de Sherbrooke
12 October	Quebec City	Canada	Palais Montcalm
13 October	Quebec City	Canada	Palais Montcalm
14 October	Quebec City	Canada	Palais Montcalm
15 October	Quebec City	Canada	Palais Montcalm
16 October	Quebec City	Canada	Palais Montcalm
26 October	Montreal	Canada	Théâtre Saint-Denis
27 October	Montreal	Canada	Théâtre Saint-Denis
28 October	Montreal	Canada	Théâtre Saint-Denis
29 October	Montreal	Canada	Théâtre Saint-Denis
13 November	Sainte-Foy	Canada	Cégep Salle Albert-Rousseau
23 November	Chicoutimi	Canada	Auditorium Dufour
24 November	Chicoutimi	Canada	Auditorium Dufour
25 November	Chicoutimi	Canada	Auditorium Dufour
26 November	Chicoutimi	Canada	Auditorium Dufour
27 November	Chicoutimi	Canada	Auditorium Dufour
29 November	Chicoutimi	Canada	Auditorium Dufour
8 December	Quebec City	Canada	Palais Montcalm
9 December	Quebec City	Canada	Palais Montcalm
10 December	Quebec City	Canada	Palais Montcalm
11 December	Quebec City	Canada	Palais Montcalm
14 December	Montreal	Canada	Théâtre Saint-Denis
15 December	Montreal	Canada	Théâtre Saint-Denis
16 December	Montreal	Canada	Théâtre Saint-Denis
17 December	Montreal	Canada	Théâtre Saint-Denis
18 December	Montreal	Canada	Théâtre Saint-Denis

List of 1989 shows
Date (1989)	City	Country	Venue
20 January	Quebec City	Canada	Palais Montcalm
21 January	Quebec City	Canada	Palais Montcalm
22 January	Quebec City	Canada	Palais Montcalm
3 February	Sherbrooke	Canada	Centre culturel de l'Université de Sherbrooke
30 May	Montreal	Canada	Théâtre Saint-Denis
31 May	Montreal	Canada	Théâtre Saint-Denis
24 June	Toronto	Canada	Harbourfront
11 July	Quebec City	Canada	Place d'Youville

== Personnel ==
Adapted from the credits in the official tour brochure.

- Celine Dion – lead vocals

=== Band ===
- Claude "Mégo" Lemay – musical direction, arrangements
- Marc Alie – drums
- Martin Daviault – saxophone
- Pierre Gauthier – guitar
- Breen LeBoeuf – bass
- Paul Morin – keyboards
- Ghislaine Dion – backing vocals

=== Production ===
- René Angélil – management
- Jean Bissonnette – stage direction
- Michel Robidas – costume design
- Michel Murphy – lighting design
- Jean-Pierre Plante – parody texts
- Pierre Huet – parody texts
- Suzanne Gingue – stage management
- Mario Petit – lighting engineer, artistic direction
- Denis Savage – concert hall sound technician
- Daniel Baron – stage sound technician
- Rachel Tremblay – wigs
- Georges Couture – costumes
