= The Collection 1982–1988 =

Compilation album by Celine Dion
- Released: 4 July 1997
- Recorded: 1982–1988
- Genre: Pop
- Length: 103:43
- Labels: Arcade; BR Music; Divucsa; Elap Music; MCP Sound & Media; Metro Doubles; Moon Records; Snapper Music; Union Square Music; White Collection
- Producers: Didier Barbelivien; Urs Peter Keller; Eddy Marnay; Romano Musumarra; Rudi Pascal; Atilla Şereftuğ

Celine Dion chronology
C'est pour vivre (1997)	The Collection 1982–1988 (1997)	Let's Talk About Love (1997)

The Collection 1982–1988 is a French-language compilation album by Canadian singer Celine Dion, released in Europe in 1997. It includes 28 songs recorded between 1982 and 1988 on a two-CD set. These tracks were previously issued on Gold Vol. 1 (1995) and C'est pour vivre (1997). The compilation appeared under various titles, with different covers, and was released by numerous music labels. It charted in several European countries, reaching number 11 in Denmark, number 20 in Belgium's Wallonia, number 27 in Sweden, and number 37 in the Netherlands.

== Background and release ==
Following the success of D'eux, which became the best-selling French-language album of all time, music labels around the world issued compilations of Dion's early and less widely available recordings from the 1980s. After Gold Vol. 1 in 1995 and C'est pour vivre in 1997, a two-CD compilation combining songs from both albums was released in Europe in 1997 and 1998. It appeared under numerous titles, including The Collection 1982–1988, The Greatest Hits 1982–1988, Premiers succès, Amour, Sus Canciones Más Bellas, C'est pour toi, Lo Mejor de Céline Dion, The French Collection, The French Love Album, The Solid Gold Collection, The Best of the Early Years: The French Collection, Ne partez pas sans moi, and Avec toi: the Very Best of the Early Years. These editions were issued with different covers and by various labels.

== Critical reception ==
Jose F. Promis of AllMusic gave the album two and a half out of five stars, writing that it gathers many of Dion's key recordings from her pre-superstar years, when she was a young French-language singer known mainly in Canada and France. Promis noted the heavily synthesized europop sound of the 1988 Eurovision winner "Ne partez pas sans moi", which introduced Dion to international audiences and became a milestone in her career. He described many songs on the set as solid, distinguished from late-1990s teen pop by the sincerity in Dion's voice. He highlighted the elegant ballads "Tellement j'ai d'amour pour toi", "Benjamin", and "La voix du bon Dieu", as well as "Avec toi" and "Du soleil au cœur", and the anthemic "C'est pour vivre". Some tracks, such as the dramatic "La religieuse", fall short due to unusual production choices, including what he described as an off-putting bridge. Others, including "Hymne à l'amitié" and the distinctly 1980s-sounding "Hello mister Sam", are more reminiscent of nursery rhyme-style material.

== Commercial performance ==
The Collection 1982–1988 reached the top 40 in several European countries, peaking at number 11 in Denmark (July 1998), number 20 in Belgium's Wallonia (August 1997), number 27 in Sweden (March 1998), and number 37 in the Netherlands (March 1998).

== Track listing ==
Disc one
No.	Title	Writer(s)	Producer(s)	Length
1.	"D'amour ou d'amitié"	Eddy Marnay; Jean-Pierre Lang; Roland Vincent	Marnay; Rudi Pascal	4:00
2.	"Visa pour les beaux jours"	Marnay; Christian Loigerot; Thierry Geoffroy	Marnay; Pascal	3:25
3.	"Ne partez pas sans moi"	Nella Martinetti; Atilla Şereftuğ	Urs Peter Keller; Şereftuğ	3:08
4.	"Les oiseaux du bonheur"	Marnay; André Popp	Marnay; Pascal	3:39
5.	"Tellement j'ai d'amour pour toi"	Marnay; Hubert Giraud	Marnay; Pascal	2:57
6.	"La religieuse"	Didier Barbelivien	Barbelivien	3:28
7.	"C'est pour toi"	Marnay; François Orenn	Marnay; Pascal	4:02
8.	"Avec toi"	Marnay; Loigerot; Geoffroy	Marnay; Pascal	3:28
9.	"Mon rêve de toujours"	Marnay; Jean-Pierre Goussaud	Marnay; Pascal	4:19
10.	"Du soleil au cœur"	Marnay; Jean-Claude Massoulier; Popp	Marnay; Pascal	2:42
11.	"À quatre pas d'ici"	Marnay; Andy Hill; Peter Sinfield	Marnay; Pascal	3:55
12.	"Un amour pour moi"	Marnay; Loigerot; Geoffroy	Marnay; Pascal	3:18
13.	"Billy"	Marnay; Patrick Lemaître	Marnay	3:05
14.	"Comment t'aimer"	Marnay; Romano Musumarra	Musumarra	4:01
Total length:				49:41

Disc two
No.	Title	Writer(s)	Producer(s)	Length
1.	"Mon ami m'a quittée"	Marnay; Christian Loigerot; Thierry Geoffroy	Marnay; Pascal	3:00
2.	"La dodo la do"	Marnay; Christian Gaubert	Marnay; Pascal	3:02
3.	"Hymne à l'amitié"	Marnay; Dario Baldan Bembo; Nini Giacomelli; Sergio Bardotti	Marnay; Pascal	3:59
4.	"Je ne veux pas"	Marnay; Musumarra	Musumarra	4:02
5.	"C'est pour vivre"	Marnay; Popp	Marnay; Pascal	4:02
6.	"En amour"	Marnay; Loigerot; Geoffroy	Marnay	3:14
7.	"Ne me plaignez pas"	Marnay; Steve Thompson	Marnay; Pascal	3:41
8.	"Les chemins de ma maison"	Marnay; Lemaître; Alain Bernard	Marnay; Pascal	4:14
9.	"Hello mister Sam"	Marnay; Loigerot; Geoffroy	Marnay; Pascal	4:12
10.	"Trois heures vingt"	Marnay; Lemaître	Marnay; Pascal	3:37
11.	"Trop jeune à dix-sept ans"	Marnay; Paul Greedus; Barry Blue	Marnay; Pascal	4:50
12.	"Paul et Virginie"	Marnay; Loigerot; Geoffroy	Marnay; Pascal	3:50
13.	"La voix du bon Dieu"	Marnay	Marnay; Pascal	3:14
14.	"Benjamin"	Marnay; Pierre Papadiamandis	Marnay; Pascal	4:36
Total length:				54:02

== Charts ==
Chart performance
Chart (1997–1998)	Peak position
Belgian Albums (Ultratop Wallonia)	20
Danish Albums (Hitlisten)	11
Dutch Albums (Album Top 100)	37
Swedish Albums (Sverigetopplistan)	27

== Release history ==
Release history
Region	Date	Label	Format
Belgium	4 July 1997	Various	CD
