= C'est pour vivre (album) =

Compilation album by Celine Dion
- Released: 3 February 1997
- Recorded: 1983–1987
- Genre: Pop
- Length: 54:02
- Labels: Budde Music; BR Music; Columbia; Dino Music; Elap Music; Eureka; Golden Pony; Leader Music; Nectar Masters; Pony Canyon; Sony; Universal; Zac Music
- Producers: Eddy Marnay; Romano Musumarra; Rudi Pascal

Celine Dion chronology
Live à Paris (1996)	C'est pour vivre (1997)	The Collection 1982–1988 (1997)

C'est pour vivre (lit. 'It's for living') is a French-language compilation album by Canadian singer Celine Dion, released in Europe, Asia, Australia, and South America in 1997. It includes 14 songs recorded between 1983 and 1987. The album was issued under various titles, with different covers, and by numerous music labels. It reached number 32 in Belgium's Wallonia and number 49 in the United Kingdom.

== Background and content ==
After the success of D'eux, which became the best-selling French-language album of all time, music labels around the world issued compilations of Dion's early and less widely available recordings from the 1980s. Following 1995's Gold Vol. 1, another compilation of 14 songs was released in 1997. It appeared in Europe, Asia, Australia, and South America under several titles, including C'est pour vivre, The French Love Album, Les premières années: The Very Best of the Early Years, Mon ami, Les hits de Céline Dion volume 2, and D'amour française. These editions were issued with different covers and by various labels.

== Critical reception ==
Charlotte Dillon of AllMusic gave the album four out of five stars, noting that even listeners who do not understand the lyrics can "enjoy the sound and feel the emotions during such notable tunes" as "Je ne veux pas", "En amour", "Ne me plaignez pas", and "Les chemins de ma maison".

== Commercial performance ==
On 3 February 1997, C'est pour vivre was released in the United Kingdom, where it reached number 49 in March 1997. In July 1997, it also entered the chart in Belgium's Wallonia, peaking at number 32 the following month.

== Track listing ==
All tracks were produced by Eddy Marnay and Rudi Pascal, except "En amour", produced by Marnay, and "Je ne veux pas", produced by Romano Musumarra.

No.	Title	Writer(s)	Length
1.	"Mon ami m'a quittée"	Marnay; Christian Loigerot; Thierry Geoffroy	3:00
2.	"La dodo la do"	Marnay; Christian Gaubert	3:02
3.	"Hymne à l'amitié"	Marnay; Dario Baldan Bembo; Nini Giacomelli; Sergio Bardotti	3:59
4.	"Je ne veux pas"	Marnay; Musumarra	4:02
5.	"C'est pour vivre"	Marnay; André Popp	4:02
6.	"En amour"	Marnay; Loigerot; Geoffroy	3:14
7.	"Ne me plaignez pas"	Marnay; Steve Thompson	3:41
8.	"Les chemins de ma maison"	Marnay; Patrick Lemaître; Alain Bernard	4:14
9.	"Hello Mister Sam"	Marnay; Loigerot; Geoffroy	4:12
10.	"Trois heures vingt"	Marnay; Lemaître	3:37
11.	"Trop jeune à dix-sept ans"	Marnay; Paul Greedus; Barry Blue	4:50
12.	"Paul et Virginie"	Marnay; Loigerot; Geoffroy	3:50
13.	"La voix du bon Dieu"	Marnay	3:14
14.	"Benjamin"	Marnay; Pierre Papadiamandis	4:36
Total length:			54:02

== Charts ==
Chart performance
Chart (1997)	Peak position
Belgian Albums (Ultratop Wallonia)	32
Scottish Albums (Official Charts)	67
UK Albums (Official Charts)	49

== Release history ==
Release history
Region	Date	Label	Format	Catalog
United Kingdom	3 February 1997	Nectar Masters	CD	NTRCD076
