= Gold Vol. 1 =

Compilation album by Celine Dion
- Released: 2 October 1995
- Recorded: 1982–1988
- Genre: Pop
- Length: 49:41
- Labels: BR Music; CID; Cutting Edge; D Sharp Music; Elap Music; Epic; FM Records; Gresham Records; Koch; Leader Music; MVM; Music Club; Polydor; PolyGram Spectrum; Pony Canyon; Startel; Versailles; Zac Music
- Producers: Didier Barbelivien; Urs Peter Keller; Eddy Marnay; Romano Musumarra; Rudi Pascal; Atilla Şereftuğ

Celine Dion chronology
D'eux (1995)	Gold Vol. 1 (1995)	Gold Vol. 2 (1995)

Gold Vol. 1 is a French-language compilation album by Canadian singer Celine Dion, released in France by Versailles on 2 October 1995. It includes 14 songs recorded between 1982 and 1988, among them the Eurovision-winning "Ne partez pas sans moi". The album was later issued in other countries under various titles, with different covers, and by several music labels. Gold Vol. 1 was certified double gold in France, where it reached number 30 on the chart. It also appeared on the charts in Belgium's Wallonia, Japan, Australia, and the United Kingdom.

== Background and release ==
After the success of D'eux, which became the best-selling French-language album of all time, various music labels around the world issued compilations with Dion's early and rare recordings from the 1980s. They were released with different covers, under numerous titles, and by several labels, including Gold Vol. 1, For You, Les premières années, Ne partez pas sans moi, La romance, Les premières chansons vol. 1, The Best of Early Years, and Classique - A Love Collection. Gold Vol. 1 was released on 2 October 1995 in France, and other titles followed in Europe, Asia, Australia, and South America.

== Critical reception ==
Rob Theakston of AllMusic gave the album three out of five stars and wrote that the recordings offer an early view of the style Dion would later develop. James Christopher Monger, also of AllMusic, awarded it two and a half stars and noted that the album includes 14 tracks in Dion's native French from her pre-Titanic years, all of which were very popular in Canada and France.

== Commercial performance ==
Gold Vol. 1 reached number 30 in France in October 1995 and was later certified double gold in 2000 for sales of over 200,000 copies. The album also peaked at number 14 in Portugal, number 32 in Belgium's Wallonia in November 1995, and number 64 in Japan in March 1996. In the United Kingdom, it was issued by two music labels: D Sharp Music (as For You) and Epic Records (as Les premières années). For You reached number 138 on the UK Albums Chart in February 1996. Les premières années entered the UK chart in October 1996 and peaked at number 135 in September 1998. In Australia, the album reached number 196 in April 1996.

== Track listing ==
No.	Title	Writer(s)	Producer(s)	Length
1.	"D'amour ou d'amitié"	Eddy Marnay; Jean-Pierre Lang; Roland Vincent	Marnay; Rudi Pascal	4:00
2.	"Visa pour les beaux jours"	Marnay; Christian Loigerot; Thierry Geoffroy	Marnay; Pascal	3:25
3.	"Ne partez pas sans moi"	Nella Martinetti; Atilla Şereftuğ	Urs Peter Keller; Şereftuğ	3:08
4.	"Les oiseaux du bonheur"	Marnay; André Popp	Marnay; Pascal	3:39
5.	"Tellement j'ai d'amour pour toi"	Marnay; Hubert Giraud	Marnay; Pascal	2:57
6.	"La religieuse"	Didier Barbelivien	Barbelivien	3:28
7.	"C'est pour toi"	Marnay; François Orenn	Marnay; Pascal	4:02
8.	"Avec toi"	Marnay; Loigerot; Geoffroy	Marnay; Pascal	3:28
9.	"Mon rêve de toujours"	Marnay; Jean-Pierre Goussaud	Marnay; Pascal	4:19
10.	"Du soleil au cœur"	Marnay; Jean-Claude Massoulier; Popp	Marnay; Pascal	2:42
11.	"À quatre pas d'ici"	Marnay; Andy Hill; Peter Sinfield	Marnay; Pascal	3:55
12.	"Un amour pour moi"	Marnay; Loigerot; Geoffroy	Marnay; Pascal	3:18
13.	"Billy"	Marnay; Patrick Lemaître	Marnay	3:05
14.	"Comment t'aimer"	Marnay; Romano Musumarra	Musumarra	4:01
Total length:				49:41

== Charts ==
Chart performance
Chart (1995–1998)	Peak position
Australian Albums (ARIA)	196
Belgian Albums (Ultratop Wallonia)	32
French Albums (SNEP)	30
Japanese Albums (Oricon Albums Chart)	64
Portuguese Albums (AFP)	14
UK Albums (OCC)	135

== Certifications ==
Certifications
Region	Certification	Certified units/sales
France (SNEP)	2× Gold	200,000^{*}
^{*} Sales figures based on certification alone.

== Release history ==
Release history
Title	Region	Date	Label	Format	Catalog
Gold Vol. 1	France	2 October 1995	Versailles	CD	VER 480287 2
For You	United Kingdom	29 January 1996	D Sharp Music	CD	DHS LCD7021
For You	Japan	28 February 1996	Cutting Edge	CD	CTCR 15008
Ne partez pas sans moi	Portugal	1 April 1996	MVM	CD	5 603395 000294
Les premières années	United Kingdom	7 October 1996	Epic	CD	488104 2
