= The Best of Celine Dion =

Compilation album by Celine Dion
- Released: 2 May 1988
- Recorded: 1982–1988
- Genre: Pop
- Length: 44:55
- Language: French
- Labels: Carrere; Mega
- Producers: Didier Barbelivien; Urs Peter Keller; Eddy Marnay; Romano Musumarra; Rudi Pascal; Atilla Şereftuğ

Celine Dion chronology
Incognito (1987)	The Best of Celine Dion (1988)	Unison (1990)

Singles from The Best of Celine Dion
- 1. "Ne partez pas sans moi" Released: May 1988

The Best of Celine Dion is a French-language compilation album by Canadian singer Celine Dion, released on 2 May 1988 by Carrere Records and Mega Records in selected European markets. Issued shortly after Dion's victory at the Eurovision Song Contest, it was her third album released in France and her first to appear in non‑Francophone Europe. In Germany, the album was retitled Vivre and issued with alternate artwork.

== Background and release ==
On 30 April 1988, Dion won the Eurovision Song Contest 1988 in Dublin, representing Switzerland with the song "Ne partez pas sans moi". Following her victory, the single was released across Europe in early May 1988, and Dion promoted it in Switzerland, France, Denmark, Germany, Finland, and Italy. The song reached number one in Belgium, number 11 in Switzerland, number 36 in France, and number 42 in the Netherlands.

In response to this success, Carrere Records and Mega Records issued a compilation album including "Ne partez pas sans moi" alongside selections from Dion's earlier French‑language recordings. The Best of Celine Dion was released on 2 May 1988 in Switzerland, France, Belgium, the Netherlands, and Luxembourg. In Germany, the album was released under the title Vivre with the same track listing but different artwork.

== Content ==
The compilation opens with Dion's Eurovision‑winning entry, "Ne partez pas sans moi". The remaining tracks were previously issued in France on Du soleil au cœur (1983) and Les oiseaux du bonheur (1984), or as standalone singles: "C'est pour vivre" (1985), "Billy" (1986), "Je ne veux pas" (1987), and "La religieuse" (1988).

Alongside "Ne partez pas sans moi", the album includes another successful single, "D'amour ou d'amitié", which reached the French top‑10 in 1983 and was certified gold by the SNEP for sales exceeding 700,000 copies. Tracks recorded between 1982 and 1986 were produced by Eddy Marnay and Rudi Pascal, while later recordings (1987–1988) were produced by Romano Musumarra, Didier Barbelivien, Urs Peter Keller, and Atilla Şereftuğ.

== Track listing ==
No.	Title	Writer(s)	Producer(s)	Length
1.	"Ne partez pas sans moi"	Nella Martinetti; Atilla Şereftuğ	Şereftuğ; Urs Peter Keller	3:07
2.	"Billy"	Eddy Marnay; Patrick Lemaître	Marnay; Rudi Pascal	2:58
3.	"Je ne veux pas"	Marnay; Romano Musumarra	Musumarra	3:50
4.	"D'amour ou d'amitié"	Marnay; Jean-Pierre Lang; Roland Vincent	Marnay; Pascal	3:59
5.	"Mon ami m'a quittée"	Marnay; Christian Loigerot; Thierry Geoffroy	Marnay; Pascal	3:00
6.	"C'est pour vivre"	Marnay; André Popp	Marnay; Pascal	3:58
7.	"La religieuse"	Didier Barbelivien	Barbelivien	3:55
8.	"C'est pour toi"	Marnay; François Orenn	Marnay; Pascal	4:02
9.	"Les chemins de ma maison"	Marnay; Lemaitre; Alain Bernard	Marnay; Pascal	4:17
10.	"Trois heures vingt"	Marnay; Lemaitre	Marnay; Pascal	3:38
11.	"Les oiseaux du bonheur"	Marnay; Popp	Marnay; Pascal	3:33
12.	"Benjamin"	Marnay; Pierre Papadiamandis	Marnay; Pascal	4:38
Total length:				44:55

== Release history ==
Release history
Region	Date	Label	Format	Catalog
France; Spain	2 May 1988	Carrere	CD	96-545
France; Spain	2 May 1988	Carrere	Cassette	76-545
France; Spain	2 May 1988	Carrere	Vinyl	66-545
Germany	2 May 1988	Carrere	CD	CAR 8 26833
Germany	2 May 1988	Carrere	Cassette	CAR 4 26833
Germany	2 May 1988	Carrere	Vinyl	CAR 6 26833
Denmark; Switzerland	2 May 1988	Mega	CD	MRCD 3314
Denmark; Switzerland	2 May 1988	Mega	Cassette	MRMC 3314
Denmark; Switzerland	2 May 1988	Mega	Vinyl	MRLP 3314
