= Chanson d'amour (disambiguation) =

Chanson d'amour (plural: Chansons d'amour) may refer to:

- Chanson d'amour (musical) 1921 French adaptation of the operetta Das Dreimäderlhaus
- "Chanson D'Amour", standard 1958 song by Wayne Shanklin, performed by Art and Dotty Todd, Manhattan Transfer 1977
- "Chanson D'Amour", hit 1981 song by BZN written by Th. Tol, J. Tuijp, C. Tol

== See also ==
- Les Chansons d'amour; see Love Songs (2007 film)
- Les plus belles chansons d'amour, a 2004 album by Celine Dion
- grande chanson d'amour; see Grand chant
