= Back Street Crawler =

Back Street Crawler may refer to:

- Back Street Crawler (album), an album by Paul Kossoff
- Back Street Crawler (band), a group of blues and rock musicians founded by guitarist Paul Kossoff
