= Sylvain Cossette =

Canadian singer

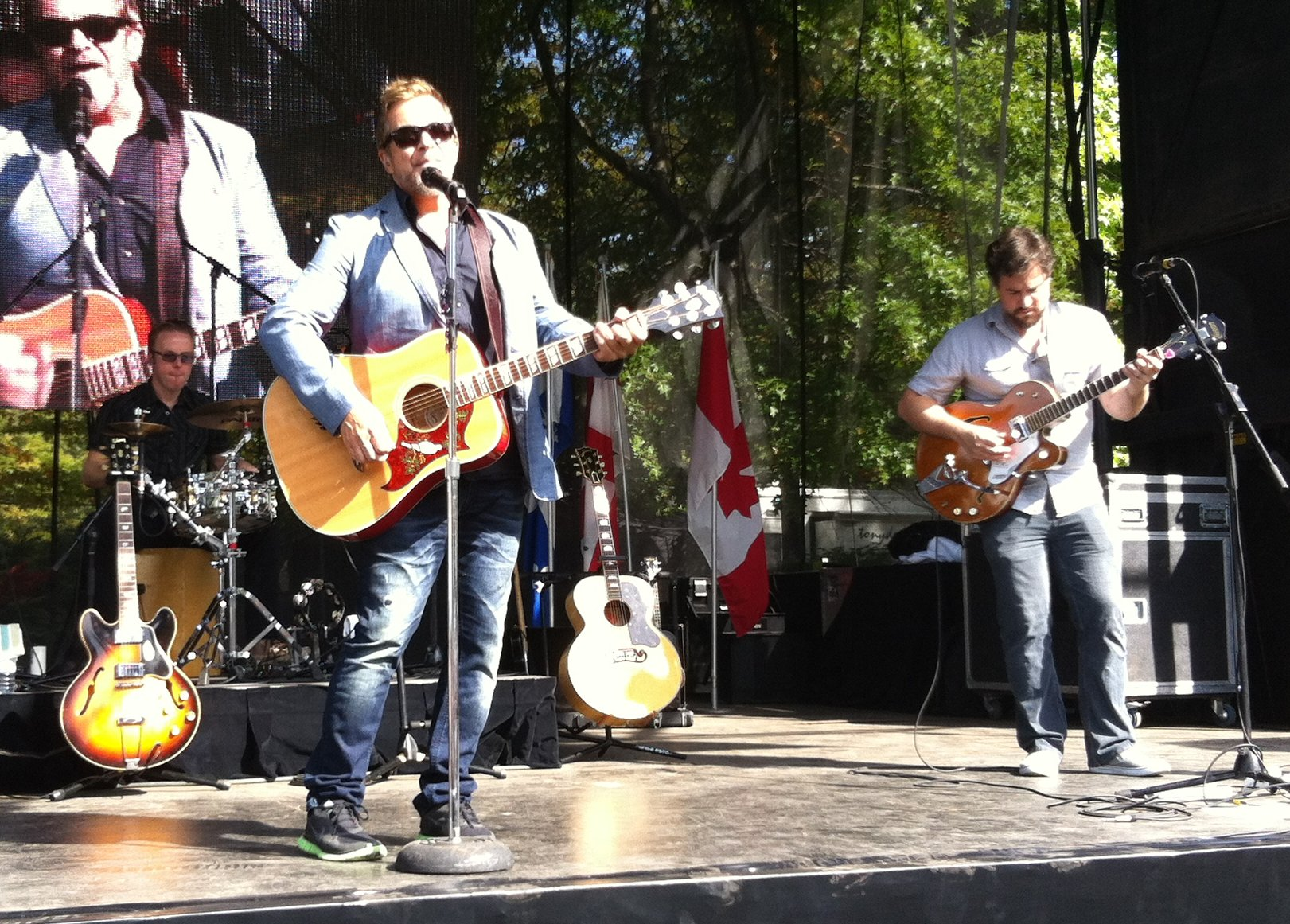
Sylvain Cossette dans le Marathon de Montréal 2014

Sylvain Cossette (born May 8, 1963) is a French-Canadian singer from Grand-Mère, Quebec (located in the Mauricie region). He was a founding member of the Quebec-based English-language band Paradox in 1984 before becoming a French-language solo artist by 1994.

== Career ==
During his career he has performed in Canada and Europe in the hit stage musicals Notre Dame De Paris and Dracula. Cossette's 2001 album Rendez-vous was certified Platinum by the CRIA in November 2002.

== Discography ==
- Paradox (1989)
- Obvious Puzzle (Paradox) (1991)
- Comme l'océan (1994)
- Blanc (1996)
- Humain (1999)
- Rendez-vous (2001)
- Compilation 1994–2004 (2004)
- Les 7 (2006 family musical theatre)
- 70s (2007)
- 70s Volume 2 (2008)
- 70s Volume 3 (2010)
- Mes Succès Francophones Volumes 1&2 (2011)
- Le jour d'après (October 2012)
- Retrospective (September 2013)
- Les numéros 1 (April 2014)
- Accords (October 2014)
- Lily et le Lutin (November 2014 children's musical theatre)
- Lily et le Lutin chantent noel (November 2015 children's musical theatre)
- Pyjama Party (November 2016 children's musical theatre)
- Café et Guitares (March 2017 instrumental)

== See also ==
- List of Mauriciens
- List of Quebec musicians
- Music of Quebec
- Culture of Quebec
