= Paradox (Canadian band) =

Canadian rock band

- Origin: Grand-Mère, Quebec, Canada
- Genres: Rock
- Years active: 1984–1991
- Label: MCA
- Members: Sylvain Cossette; Denis Lavigne; Jean-Francois Houle; Francois Cossette

Paradox was a Canadian band formed in the 1980s by singer/guitarist Sylvain Cossette. The band's best known lineup featured Sylvain on vocals, Francois Cossette (guitar), Denis Lavigne (drums), and Jean-Francois Houle (bass). The band broke up in 1991.

== History ==
Quebec-born Sylvain Cossette formed the Anglophone band Paradox with Denis Lavigne and Jean-Francois Houle as a cover band in Grand-Mère, Quebec, in 1984. After establishing a local reputation for their live act, the band received a FACTOR award in June 1988. This grant allowed them to record a demo which eventually led to a record deal with MCA Music America. With Sylvain's brother Francois joining the lineup on guitar, the band recorded their self-titled debut album Paradox at Studio Victor in Montreal in 1988. Produced by Pierre 'Baz' Bazinet (who was best known for his work with other Canadian acts including Luba and Boulevard), much of the album was co-written with Sass Jordan whose own star was rising at the time. The band produced a couple of videos that saw regular rotation on MuchMusic thanks to the catchy hooks and their video friendly looks. In recognition for their airplay and touring across Canada, they were nominated in 1990 for a Juno Award for "Most Promising Group of the Year".

A second album Obvious Puzzle followed in 1991, which didn't capture as much attention as their debut. After a final concert in 1991 at the Spectrum in Montreal, the band broke up and Sylvain continued his career as a French solo artist.

== Discography ==
=== Albums ===
- Paradox – 1989
- Obvious Puzzle – 1991

=== Singles ===
- "Waterline" (1989) #24 CAN
- "Another Day" (1989) #46 CAN
- "Catch Me in the Act" (1990) #54 CAN
- "Kiss Me on the Lips" (1991) #49 CAN
