= Back Street Crawler (album) =

Studio album by Paul Kossoff
- Released: 16 November 1973
- Recorded: Island Studios, London
- Genre: Blues rock, hard rock, jam rock
- Length: 35:54
- Label: Island
- Producer: Paul Kossoff; Bob Potter; Richard "Diga" Digby Smith; Jean Roussel

Professional ratings
Review scores
Source	Rating
AllMusic	4/5 stars

Back Street Crawler is the debut studio album by English guitarist Paul Kossoff, released in 1973; the same year Kossoff's band Free disbanded, Kossoff was able to moderate his drug addiction to record the album, which featured contributions from his former Free bandmates, as well as Yes drummer Alan White and Cat Stevens Keyboardist, Jean Roussel.

"Molten Gold" is not, as has been alleged, a reunion of the original Free line-up (Kossoff, Paul Rodgers, Andy Fraser, Simon Kirke); it is an outtake from the 1972 Free album Free at Last, with overdubs.

"Time Away" features three-fifths of the Mk II Free line-up (Kossoff, Kirke, Tetsu Yamauchi), along with singer-songwriter-guitarist John Martyn, who would in 1975 invite Kossoff to guest on his own tour; this collaboration can be heard on expanded editions of Martyn's Live at Leeds album.

== Track listing ==
=== Original 1973 release ===
All tracks are written by Paul Kossoff, except where noted

Side one
No.	Title	Length
1.	"Tuesday Morning"	17:32

Side two
No.	Title	Writer(s)	Length
2.	"I'm Ready"	Jess Roden, Jean Roussel	2:26
3.	"Time Away"	Kossoff, John Martyn	5:46
4.	"Molten Gold"		5:48
5.	"Back Street Crawler (Don't Need You No More)"		4:22

=== Deluxe edition, 2008 ===
Disc one
No.	Title	Writer(s)	Length
1.	"Tuesday Morning"		17:32
2.	"I'm Ready"	Roden, Roussel	2:26
3.	"Time Away"	Kossoff, Martyn	5:46
4.	"Molten Gold"		5:48
5.	"Back Street Crawler (Don't Need You No More)"		4:22
6.	"Tuesday Morning" (Early Take 1)		4:31
7.	"Tuesday Morning" (Early Take 2)		12:19
8.	"Tuesday Morning Blues"		5:38
9.	"Tuesday Morning Groove"		6:52
10.	"Tuesday Morning Boogie"		4:21
11.	"Tuesday Morning Piano Jam"		7:47

Disc two
No.	Title	Writer(s)	Length
1.	"I'm Ready" (Take 4)	Roden, Roussel	5:43
2.	"The Lady Is a Tramp"	Lorenz Hart, Richard Rodgers	1:24
3.	"I'm Ready" (Take 10, Full Version)	Roden, Roussel	6:16
4.	"May You Never"	Martyn	4:24
5.	"Leslie Jam"	Kossoff, Martyn	3:32
6.	"Time Away" (Complete Jam)	Kossoff, Martyn	38:21
7.	"Molten Gold"		5:54
8.	"Molten Gold" (Songs of Yesterday Version)		6:12
9.	"Back Street Crawler (Don't Need You No More)" (Single Guitar Track, No. 14)		4:31

== Personnel ==
- Paul Kossoff – lead guitar
- Trevor Burton – bass ("Tuesday Morning")
- Alan White – drums ("Tuesday Morning", "I'm Ready")
- John "Rabbit" Bundrick – keyboards ("Tuesday Morning"); organ, chimes, piano ("Molten Gold")
- Alan Spenner – bass ("I'm Ready")
- Jean Roussel – keyboards ("I'm Ready", "Back Street Crawler (Don't Need You No More)")
- Jess Roden – lead vocals ("I'm Ready"); harmony vocals ("Molten Gold")
- Tetsu Yamauchi – bass ("Time Away")
- Simon Kirke – drums ("Time Away", "Molten Gold")
- John Martyn – lead vocals, guitar ("May You Never"); guitar ("Time Away", "Leslie Jam")
- Paul Rodgers – lead vocals ("Molten Gold")
- Andy Fraser – bass ("Molten Gold")
- Conrad Isidore – drums ("Back Street Crawler (Don't Need You No More)")
- Clive Chaman – bass ("Back Street Crawler (Don't Need You No More)")

=== Production ===
- All songs produced by Paul Kossoff
- "Time Away" and "Molten Gold" co-produced by Bob Potter
- "Back Street Crawler (Don't Need You No More)" co-produced by Richard "Diga" Digby Smith and Jean Roussel
- "Tuesday Morning" and "Back Street Crawler (Don't Need You No More)" engineered by Richard "Diga" Digby Smith
- "I'm Ready" and "Molten Gold" engineered by Bob Potter
- "Time Away" engineered by Tony Platt
