= Voler =

Promotional single by Michel Sardou and Celine Dion

from the album Être une femme 2010
- Language: French
- Released: 2 September 2010
- Recorded: 2010
- Studio: Hauts de Gammes (Paris)
- Genre: Pop
- Length: 3:46
- Label: Universal
- Songwriters: Jacques Veneruso; Michel Sardou
- Producers: Jacques Veneruso; Thierry Blanchard

Music video
- "Voler" on YouTube

"Voler" (lit. 'Fly') is a song by French singer Michel Sardou and Canadian singer Celine Dion from Sardou's 2010 studio album Être une femme 2010. Written by Jacques Veneruso and Sardou and produced by Veneruso and Thierry Blanchard, it was released as a promotional single on 2 September 2010. The song reached number 48 on the Belgium's Wallonia singles chart in October 2010.

== Music video ==
The music video was released on 22 November 2010. It includes new footage of Sardou intercut with excerpts from two of Dion's 2007 music videos: "Et s'il n'en restait qu'une (je serais celle-là)" and "Immensité".

== Charts ==
Chart performance
| Chart (2010) | Peak position |
|---|---|
| Belgium (Ultratop 50 Wallonia) | 48 |
