= Pierre Bazinet =

Canadian record producer

- Also known as: Baz
- Born: May 5, 1956 (age 70); Montreal, Quebec, Canada
- Occupation: Record producer
- Years active: 1986–present

Pierre "Baz" Bazinet (born May 5, 1956 in Montreal, Quebec) is a Canadian record producer. Over the course of his career, he has produced many popular Canadian albums from a variety of artists, including Les Frères à Cheval, Madame, Robert Charlebois, Jean Leloup, Celine Dion, Boulevard, Luba, Paradox, Bruno Pelletier, Sass Jordan, Haze & Shuffle, Stereomovers, Hometownlights and Michel Lemieux.

Twice he was the recipient of the Félix Award for Producer of the Year: in 1986, for Luba's Between The Earth & Sky, and once again in 1988 for Sass Jordan's Tell Somebody, in addition to having been nominated several times.

== Discography ==
Bazinet produced or co-produced the following albums:

- DAGGER - Not Afraid of the Night (1985)
- Luba - Between The Earth & Sky (1986)
- Céline Dion - Incognito (1987)
- Boulevard - BLVD (1988)
- Sass Jordan - Tell Somebody (1988)
- Paradox - Paradox (1989)
- Haze & Shuffle - Get Your Haze (1993)
- Stereomovers - Stereomovers (2006)
- Emery Street "Co-produced No Regrets no Apologies"
