= Vois comme c'est beau =

Single by Claudette Dion and Celine Dion

from the album Hymnes à l'amour, volume 2
- Language: French
- B-side: "Un enfant c'est comme ça"
- Released: June 1985
- Studio: Studio St-Charles (Longueuil)
- Genre: Pop
- Length: 3:26
- Label: TBS
- Songwriter: Martin Pelletier
- Producer: René Angélil

Celine Dion singles chronology
"Un amour pour moi" (1985)	"Vois comme c'est beau" (1985)	"C'est pour toi" (1985)

"Vois comme c'est beau" (lit. 'Look how beautiful it is') is a song by Martin Peltier, a Canadian singer and songwriter from Quebec. It first appeared on his 1974 album Je voyagerai seul. The track was written by Peltier and produced by Denis Lepage and Robert Alary. In June 1975, it was recorded as a duet with Canadian singer Thérèse Deroy and released as a single in Quebec, where it reached number one.

== Claudette Dion and Celine Dion version ==
Claudette Dion and her sister, Celine Dion, recorded a cover of "Vois comme c'est beau" for Claudette's 1985 album Hymnes à l'amour, volume 2. The single was issued in June 1985 in Quebec, Canada. The song has not appeared on any of Celine Dion's albums. On 22 June 1985, it entered the Quebec chart, where it spent eight weeks and peaked at number 14.

=== Formats and track listing ===
- Canadian 7-inch single
1. "Vois comme c'est beau" – 3:26
2. "Un enfant c'est comme ça" – 3:57

=== Charts ===
Chart performance
Chart (1985)	Peak position
Quebec (ADISQ)	14
