= Jours de fièvre =

Single by Celine Dion

from the album Incognito
- Language: French
- B-side: "Ma chambre"
- Released: September 1988
- Studio: Endel-The Synth (Montreal)
- Genre: Pop
- Length: 5:12
- Label: Mega
- Songwriters: Eddy Marnay; Jean Roussel
- Producer: Jean Roussel

Celine Dion singles chronology
"Délivre-moi" (1988)	"Jours de fièvre" (1988)	"D'abord, c'est quoi l'amour" (1989)

Audio
- "Jours de fièvre" on YouTube

"Jours de fièvre" (lit. 'Days of fever') is a single by Celine Dion from her album Incognito. It was released in September 1988 exclusively in Denmark.

== Background ==
The B-side of "Jours de fièvre" includes the track "Ma chambre", although the back sleeve of the 7-inch single lists "Partout je te vois".

A music video was produced for the Incognito TV special, which aired in September 1987. It was created by the Canadian Broadcasting Corporation and directed by Jacques Payette.

== Formats and track listing ==
- Danish 7-inch single
1. "Jours de fièvre" – 5:08
2. "Ma chambre" – 4:10
