= Jean Roussel =

Record producer (born 1951)

- Born: Jean Alain Roussel; 1951 (age 74–75); Port Louis, Mauritius
- Genres: Rock, Pop, Reggae, Soul, Funk
- Occupations: Composer, Record Producer, Keyboardist, Arranger, Engineer, Music Educator

Jean Alain Roussel (born 1951) is a Mauritian-born musician, composer, record producer, arranger, educator and Sono-Therapist.

== Career ==
He is best known for his keyboard work from the 1970s through today, playing regularly live and in studio with Cat Stevens (e.g. "Peace Train", "Bitterblue", "Oh Very Young", "Tuesday's Dead", "Wild World", "Where Do the Children Play?", "Sitting", "Catch Bull at Four", "Teaser and the Firecat", and "Buddha and the Chocolate Box"), and playing on and arranging "Every Little Thing She Does Is Magic" by The Police in 1980. He was also the Composer of Rick Ross's Grammy-nominated (2013) "Ashamed" and Wilson Pickett's "Shameless" (1979).

Roussel has worked in various capacities with many artists, including Paul Kossoff (Producer/Composer "Back Street Crawler"), Sandy Denny, Thin Lizzy, Phil Lynott, Gary Moore, Peter Frampton, Roy Buchanan, Bob Marley and the Wailers ("Natty Dread", "No Woman, No Cry", "Rastaman Vibration", "Lively Up Yourself", etc.), Ron Wood, John Paul Jones, Frida, Celine Dion, Elkie Brooks, John Martyn, Alan White, Roger Glover, Luther Vandross, T-Bone Walker, Muddy Waters, Mitch Mitchell, Jerry Leiber and Mike Stoller, Cheryl Lynn, Sting, Bobby Womack, Dusty Springfield, Paul Simon, Tim Hardin, Suzi Quatro, Don Everly, Womack & Womack, Milton Nascimento, Robert Palmer, 10cc, Kevin Coyne, Luc Plamondon, Jean-Loup Dabadie, Etienne Roda-Gil, Osibisa, Jon Hendricks, Françoise Hardy, Donovan, Pappo's Blues, Astor Piazzolla, Joan Armatrading, Tony Levin, Joe Cocker, Jimmy Cliff, Olivia Newton-John, Julien Clerc, Catherine Lara, Jeane Manson, Charles Trenet, Eddy Marnay, and Robert Charlebois, among others.

== Credits ==
Album	Artist	Released	Roussel's credits
Abracadabra	Claire Hamill	1975	Piano, orchestral arrangements
Back Street Crawler	Paul Kossoff	1973	Producer, composer, Keyboards
Back to Earth	Cat Stevens	1978	Piano, strings, arranger, keyboards, organ (Hammond), piano (electric)
Back to the Drive	Suzi Quatro	2006	Composer
Back to the Night	Joan Armatrading	1975	Keyboards, arrangements
Bad News	Joe Jammer	1973	Keyboards
Buddha and the Chocolate Box	Cat Stevens	1974	Strings, arranger, conductor, keyboards, string arrangements
Catch Bull at Four	Cat Stevens	1972	Organ, piano, keyboards
Chris Farlowe Band Live	Chris Farlowe	1975	Producer & keyboards
David Courtney's First Day	David Courtney	1975	Piano
Daydo	Alun Davies	1972	Keyboards
Deceptive Bends	10cc	1977	Organ, peyboards, piano (electric)
Essence to Essence	Donovan	1973	Clavinet & keyboards
Foreigner	Cat Stevens	1973	Bass, strings, keyboards, piano (electric), string arrangements, brass arrangement, bass arrangement, woodwind arrangement
Happy Children	Osibisa	1973	Keyboards
I Want You	Wilson Pickett	1978	Producer, keyboards, arranger, composer
Incognito	Celine Dion	1987	Producer, composer, arranger and various instruments
I've Got My Own Album to Do	Ronnie Wood	1974	Keyboards
Izitso	Cat Stevens	1977	Composer, organ, synthesizer, flute, piano, glockenspiel, keyboards, organ (Hammond), piano (electric), vibraphone, string arrangements, sequencing, synthesizer strings
Jamaica Say You Will	Joe Cocker	1975	Hammond organ
Julien Clerc	Julien Clerc	1980	Keyboards, arranger
Lancashire Hustler	Keef Hartley	1973	Keyboards
Lark	Linda Lewis	1972	Keyboards
Like an Old Fashioned Waltz	Sandy Denny	1973	Keyboards
Live and Learn	Elkie Brooks	1979	Keyboards, arranger
Marjory Razorblade	Kevin Coyne	1973	Keyboards
Mick Taylor	Mick Taylor	1979	Piano, Hammond organ
Natty Dread	Bob Marley and the Wailers	1974	("No Woman No Cry", "Natty Dread" and "Lively Up Yourself") Hammond Organ, keyboards, arrangements
Nightlife	Thin Lizzy	1974	Keyboards, Hammond organ
Not a Little Girl Anymore	Linda Lewis	1975	Keyboards
Now Hear This	Junior Hanson	1974	Keyboards, composer
Now Look	Ronnie Wood	1975	Composer, synthesizer, keyboards, clavinet
Numbers	Cat Stevens	1975	Organ, synthesizer, piano, strings, arranger, harpsichord, keyboards, organ (Hammond), piano (electric), brass, overdubs, vibraphone, string arrangements, synthesizer strings
Obsessed	Les films téléscène inc	1987	"Music"
October	Claire Hamill	1973	Keyboards
Painted Head	Tim Hardin	1973	Keyboards
"Pieces of a Jigsaw"	Del Richardson	1973	Keyboards
"Pieces"	Juicy Lucy	1972	Keyboards
"Pressure Drop"	Robert Palmer	1976	Keyboards, Clavinet, Hammond Organ, Arrangements
Quickstep	Chilli charles	1975	Bass, keyboards
Rastaman Vibration	Bob Marley and the Wailers	1976	Hammond Organ, Keyboards, Arranger
Reebop	Rebop Kwaku Baah	1972	Hammond organ, piano, Rhodes, composer, arranger, co-producer
Richy Snyder	Richy Snyder	1978	Keyboards
Sans Entracte	Julien Clerc	1980	Producer, Keyboards, Arranger, Composer
Saturnight (Live in Tokyo)	Cat Stevens	1974	Keyboards, arrangements
Shooting Star	Elkie Brooks	1978	Keyboards, arranger
Short Cut Draw Blood	Jim Capaldi	1975	Bass, keyboards
Squire	Alan Hull	1975	Keyboards, arrangements
Sunset Towers	Don Everly	1974	Bass, keyboards
Surprise Sisters	Surprise Sisters	1976	Keyboards, arrangements
Taking It All in Stride	Silverado	1977	Organ, piano
Teaser and the Firecat	Cat Stevens	1971	Organ ("Peace Train", "Tuesday's Dead", "Bitter Blue")
Two Days Away	Elkie Brooks	1977	Keyboards, arranger
Whale Meat Again	Jim Capaldi	1974	Bass, keyboards, arrangements
White Heat	Dusty Springfield	1982	Arranger, composer, synthesizer
Woman Overboard	Linda Lewis	1977	Keyboards, arrangements
Atlantis [1973]	Atlantis	1973	Keyboards
Jabula	Jabula	1975	Keyboards
In Love	Cheryl Lynn	1980	Synthesizers, arranger, keyboards
Ghost in the Machine	The Police	1981	Keyboards, arranger ("Every Little Thing...")
Adrian	Buzy	1983	Producer, Arranger, Musical Director, Conductor, Keyboards, Composer
Insomnie	Buzy	1983	Producer, arranger, musical director, conductor, keyboards
Mes photos couleur	Jeane Manson	1983	Producer, arranger, musical director, conductor, keyboards
J't'aime comme un fou	Robert Charlebois	1983	Arranger, keyboards, producer
Mask	Roger Glover	1984	Keyboards, group member
Aime-moi	Julien Clerc	1984	Composer
Préférences	Julien Clerc	1985	Composer, arranger, keyboards
Les aventures à l'eau	Julien Clerc	1987	Composer
Serious Business	Brian Greenway	1988	Keyboards, arranger
Charlebois, Vol. 1	Robert Charlebois	1991	Arranger, keyboards
Sweet Dreams: The Anthology	Roy Buchanan	1992	Producer, keyboards
Majikat	Cat Stevens	2004	Hammond organ, clavinet, electric piano, synthesizer (Recorded 1976, Released 2004)

== Awards ==
- Félix Award (1987) for arranging his composition, with Eddy MARNAY "Comme un cœur froid" and was nominated for two other Félix Awards for producing and engineering "Incognito", Winner.
- Platinum Album Award (1982) for arrangement and keyboards on Ghost in the Machine by The Police
- Platinum Album Award (1984) for contribution to Legend by Bob Marley and The Wailers
- Grammy Nomination (2013) for Songwriter of the Year for "Ashamed" by Rick Ross
- Multiple Platinum Albums for contribution to Every Little Thing She Does Is Magic by The Police
- Multiple Platinum Albums for contribution to several Cat Stevens albums
- Jacques d'Honneur Cours Florent 2022, France
