= Incognito (song) =

Single by Celine Dion

from the album Incognito
- Language: French
- B-side: "Ma chambre"
- Released: June 1987
- Studio: Endel-The Synth (Montreal)
- Genre: Pop
- Length: 4:39
- Label: CBS; Carrere
- Songwriters: Luc Plamondon; Jean Roussel
- Producer: Jean Roussel

Celine Dion singles chronology
"On traverse un miroir" (1987)	"Incognito" (1987)	"Lolita (trop jeune pour aimer)" (1987)

Music video
- "Incognito" on YouTube

"Incognito" is the second single from Celine Dion's album Incognito, released in June 1987 in Quebec, Canada. It was written by Luc Plamondon, who later worked with Dion on several projects. The single includes "Ma chambre", a non-album track used as the B-side. On 6 June 1987 the song entered the Quebec Singles Chart and reached number one for six weeks. It remained on the chart for 34 weeks in total. "Incognito" received a Félix Award for Best Pop Song of the Year. It was also issued as a single in France in September 1988. The song was later added to the 2005 greatest hits album On ne change pas. A live version appears on the Céline une seule fois / Live 2013 CD/DVD.

== Music video ==
The music video was directed by Jacques Payette and released in 1987. It also opened the Incognito TV special, which aired in September 1987 and was produced by the Canadian Broadcasting Corporation. The video is included on Dion's DVD On ne change pas.

== Formats and track listing ==
- Canadian 7-inch single
1. "Incognito" – 4:39
2. "Ma chambre" – 4:10
- French 7-inch single
1. "Incognito" – 4:37
2. "D'abord, c'est quoi l'amour" – 4:22

== Charts ==
Chart performance
Chart (1987)	Peak position
Quebec (ADISQ)	1
