= Atilla Şereftuğ =

Turkish-Swiss songwriter (born 1950)

Atilla Şereftuğ (born 16 November 1950) is a Turkish-Swiss songwriter, born in Istanbul.

== Career ==
In 1986, Şereftuğ participated in the Swiss heats of the Eurovision Song Contest as composer of the song "Pas pour moi". The song's co-composer was Nella Martinetti. "Pas pour moi" won the Swiss final and, performed by Daniela Simmons represented Switzerland in the Eurovision Song Contest held in Bergen, Norway. It was voted into second place behind the Belgian entry.

In 1988, along with Nella Martinetti, he once again qualified for the Swiss Eurovision heat, this time with the song "Ne partez pas sans moi," performed by the Canadian singer Celine Dion. By a small margin of seven votes the song won and went on to the final in Dublin. Consequently, in 1988, Celine Dion won the Eurovision Song Contest, by an even smaller margin of just one point, with the song "Ne partez pas sans moi."

== See also ==
- Eurovision Song Contest 1988
