= Lolita (trop jeune pour aimer) =

Single by Celine Dion

from the album Incognito
- Language: French
- B-side: "Ma chambre"
- Released: October 1987
- Studio: Endel-The Synth (Montreal)
- Genre: Pop
- Length: 4:19
- Label: CBS
- Songwriters: Luc Plamondon; Daniel Lavoie
- Producer: Jean Roussel

Celine Dion singles chronology
"Incognito" (1987)	"Lolita (trop jeune pour aimer)" (1987)	"Comme un cœur froid" (1988)

Music video
- "Lolita (trop jeune pour aimer)" on YouTube

"Lolita (trop jeune pour aimer)" (lit. 'Lolita (too young to love)') is the third single from Celine Dion's album Incognito, issued in October 1987 in Quebec, Canada. The track was composed and produced by Jean Roussel, with lyrics by Luc Plamondon.

== Background ==
The song refers to the 1955 novel Lolita by Vladimir Nabokov. Its lyrics present a young woman who insists she is not "too young" for love. Dion recalled, "When I saw what Luc had written, I was bowled over. Like Eddy, Luc had explored my inner life. What he had written was so close to me that I couldn't help being really unsettled by it". She also said the song reflected her feelings for her manager and future husband René Angélil, adding, "The first time I sang the words to 'Lolita,' I was in front of René, and I sang it to arouse him".

The single was issued with "Ma chambre" as the B-side. "Lolita (trop jeune pour aimer)" reached number one in Quebec for two weeks. It entered the chart on 3 October 1987 and remained for 22 weeks.

An early music video was created for the Incognito TV special, broadcast in September 1987 and produced by the Canadian Broadcasting Corporation. It was directed by Jacques Payette. A second commercial video was filmed later that year in Scotland, also directed by Payette. It shows Dion walking around Edinburgh and riding a bus. According to Dion's publicist at the time, Mia Dumont, the video surprised many fans, as it marked her shift from child performer to adult artist. Dumont said, "All of a sudden she had this body. These legs from here to there. And she was beautiful. People could see that she was beautiful". The video is included on Dion's DVD On ne change pas.

The song was later added to the 2005 greatest hits album On ne change pas.

== Formats and track listing ==
- Canadian 7-inch single
1. "Lolita (trop jeune pour aimer)" – 4:19
2. "Ma chambre" – 4:10

== Charts ==
Chart performance
Chart (1987)	Peak position
Quebec (ADISQ)	1
