= Love in the Shadows (E. G. Daily song) =

1986 song recorded by E. G. Daily

Single by E. G. Daily

from the album Wild Child
- B-side: "Little Toy"
- Released: 1986
- Genre: Post-disco
- Length: 3:54
- Label: A&M
- Songwriters: E. G. Daily; Harold Faltermeyer
- Producer: Harold Faltermeyer

E. G. Daily singles chronology
"Say It, Say It" (1986)	"Love in the Shadows" (1986)	"Mind over Matter" (1987)

Music video
- "Love in the Shadows" on YouTube

"Love in the Shadows" is a song recorded by American singer E. G. Daily. It was written by Daily and Harold Faltermeyer, and produced by Faltermeyer. The song was first recorded in 1984 for the soundtrack to the film Thief of Hearts. In 1985, it was re-recorded for Daily's debut album Wild Child and released as a single in 1986. In 1987, Canadian singer Celine Dion recorded a French-language version titled "Délivre-moi".

== Formats and track listing ==
- 7-inch single
1. "Love in the Shadows" – 3:54
2. "Little Toy" – 3:50
- 12-inch single
1. "Love in the Shadows" (special remixed version) – 8:45
2. "Love in the Shadows" (dub version) – 4:45
3. "Little Toy" – 3:50
- 2001 CD single
1. "Love in the Shadows" (Solar City big room mix) – 10:44
2. "Love in the Shadows" (Solar City epic club mix) – 10:31
3. "Love in the Shadows" (Solar City epic club mix II) – 10:10
4. "Love in the Shadows" (Solar City radio mix) – 4:41
5. "Love in the Shadows" (Solar City dark dub) – 5:48
6. "Love in the Shadows" (Solar City piano mix) – 3:52
7. "Love in the Shadows" (Brutal Bill vocal mix) – 10:52
8. "Love in the Shadows" (Brutal Bill dub) – 7:32

== Charts ==
Chart performance
Chart (1986)	Peak position
Netherlands (Single Top 100)	37
US Dance Club Songs (Billboard)	6

== Celine Dion version ==
"Délivre-moi"

Single by Celine Dion

from the album Incognito
- Language: French
- B-side: "Jours de fièvre"
- Released: June 1988
- Studio: Endel-The Synth (Montreal); DMS (Montreal)
- Genre: Pop
- Length: 4:19
- Label: CBS
- Songwriters: Eddy Marnay; E. G. Daily; Harold Faltermeyer
- Producer: Pierre Bazinet

Celine Dion singles chronology
"Ne partez pas sans moi" (1988)	"Délivre-moi" (1988)	"Jours de fièvre" (1988)

Audio
- "Délivre-moi" on YouTube

"Délivre-moi" (lit. 'Deliver me') is the fifth single from Celine Dion's album Incognito. It was released in June 1988 in Quebec, Canada.

The song reached number four on the Quebec chart. It entered the chart on June 18, 1988, and remained for 15 weeks.

"Délivre-moi" later appeared on Dion's Japanese maxi-single "Unison" (1991). A live version was included on the Unison home video (1991), and the same performance was added to the rare Canadian edition of her single "Beauty and the Beast" (1991).

An early music video was produced for the Incognito TV special aired in September 1987 by the Canadian Broadcasting Corporation and directed by Jacques Payette. A second commercial video was released in 1988 to accompany the single.

=== Formats and track listing ===
- Canadian 7-inch single
1. "Délivre-moi" – 4:19
2. "Jours de fièvre" – 5:08

=== Charts ===
Chart performance
Chart (1988)	Peak position
Quebec (ADISQ)	4
