= Nella Martinetti =

Swiss singer (1946– 2011)

- Martinetti in 1975

Background information
- Born: 4 June 1946; Brissago, Switzerland
- Died: 29 July 2011 (aged 65) Männedorf, Switzerland
- Occupations: Singer, songwriter, actress

Nella Martinetti (21 January 1946 – 29 July 2011) was a Swiss singer, songwriter and actress, affectionately known as "Bella Nella".

== Biography ==
She was born in Brissago, Ticino, Switzerland. In 1986, she became the first winner of the Grand Prix der Volksmusik with the song "Bella Musica", which she composed. In 1987, along with Atilla Şereftuğ, Martinetti approached a then unknown young Canadian singer Céline Dion, asking her to represent Switzerland in the Eurovision Song Contest 1988. Dion won the Eurovision Song Contest with the song "Ne partez pas sans moi."

Martinetti entered into a civil union with her longtime partner Marianne Schneebeli in 2009. The couple lived in Jona.

In later life, Martinetti suffered from fibromyalgia.

Martinetti died in Männedorf, Canton of Zürich in 2011 from pancreatic cancer, aged 65.

== See also ==
- Grand Prix der Volksmusik
- Eurovision Song Contest 1988
