= Incognito (Celine Dion album) =

- Canadian cover

Studio album by Celine Dion
- Released: 2 April 1987
- Recorded: 1987
- Studios: DMS; Endel-The Synth; Ultra-Son
- Genre: Pop
- Length: 36:53
- Language: French
- Label: CBS
- Producers: Pierre Bazinet; Aldo Nova; Jean Roussel

Celine Dion chronology
| Les chansons en or (1986) | Incognito (1987) | The Best of Celine Dion (1988) |

Singles from Incognito
- 1. "On traverse un miroir" Released: April 1987; 2. "Incognito" Released: June 1987; 3. "Lolita (trop jeune pour aimer)" Released: October 1987; 4. "Comme un cœur froid" Released: February 1988; 5. "Délivre-moi" Released: June 1988; 6. "Jours de fièvre" Released: September 1988; 7. "D'abord, c'est quoi l'amour" Released: October 1988

Incognito is the eighth French-language studio album by Canadian singer Celine Dion and her first release on a major record label. It was issued by CBS Records on 2 April 1987 in Quebec, Canada. The album includes eight tracks produced by Jean Roussel, Aldo Nova, and Pierre Bazinet. Six singles were released in Quebec, all reaching the top five on the Quebec Airplay Chart, including four number‑one hits: "Incognito", "Lolita (trop jeune pour aimer)", "Comme un cœur froid", and "D'abord, c'est quoi l'amour". Incognito was certified double platinum in Canada and has sold over 500,000 copies worldwide. It topped the Quebec chart for five weeks.

== Background and development ==
Incognito showed a change in Dion's early career, presenting a new image, a more contemporary musical direction, and a refreshed roster of writers and producers. Released in April 1987, the album includes material produced by Jean Roussel, Aldo Nova, and Pierre Bazinet. Lyrics were written by Luc Plamondon, Isa Minoke, and Eddy Marnay, while the music was composed by Roussel, Nova, Daniel Lavoie, Robert Lafond, and Steven Tracey. The album also includes a French-language adaptation of E. G. Daily's "Love in the Shadows", titled "Délivre-moi".

In September 1988, Incognito was released in France with an altered track listing, replacing "Partout je te vois" and "Délivre-moi" with "Ne partez pas sans moi", the winning song of the Eurovision Song Contest 1988, and "Ma chambre", originally a B-side. The original Canadian track list was restored in the 1992 French reissue, and in 1995 the album became available internationally.

== Singles ==
The lead single, "On traverse un miroir", entered the Quebec Airplay Chart on 25 April 1987 and peaked at number two. The title track, "Incognito", debuted on 6 June 1987 and spent six weeks at number one. "Lolita (trop jeune pour aimer)" entered the chart on 3 October 1987 and topped it for two weeks.

The fourth single, "Comme un cœur froid", debuted on 6 February 1988 and also spent two weeks at number one. "Délivre-moi" entered the chart on 18 June 1988 and peaked at number four. The final Canadian single, "D'abord, c'est quoi l'amour", debuted on 17 October 1988 and became the album's fourth number-one hit. "Jours de fièvre" was released as a single in Denmark in September 1988.

== Promotion ==
On 2 April 1987, Dion performed at a special show held to mark the release of Incognito at Club L'Esprit in Montreal, Canada. On 7 April 1987, she appeared on the television show Montréal en direct on Télé-Metropole and sang "On traverse un miroir", "Lolita (trop jeune pour aimer)", and "Incognito". On 27 September 1987, a television special titled Spécial Incognito aired on Radio-Canada. It included the music video for "Incognito" and performances of songs from the album ("Partout je te vois", "Lolita (trop jeune pour aimer)", "Délivre-moi", "On traverse un miroir", "Jours de fièvre", "Comme un cœur froid") as well as three covers ("My Heart Belongs to Daddy", "Chattanooga Choo Choo", and "Seulement qu'une aventure"). On 2 November 1987, Dion performed the English-language version of "Partout je te vois", "Have a Heart", at the Juno Awards. During 1987, she also performed "Incognito" and "On traverse un miroir" on Ad lib on TVA, "Ma chambre" on Ferland/Nadeau on Télé-Metropole, "Partout je te vois", "The Greatest Love of All", and "Encore et encore" (a duet with Francis Cabrel) on Station soleil on Radio-Québec, and "Comme un cœur froid" on Montréal en direct.

On 15 February 1988, Dion sang "Incognito", "Comme un cœur froid", and "Memory" on Téléfun on TQS. On 1 July 1988, she performed "Comme un cœur froid" and "Can't We Try" (a duet with Dan Hill) on Joyeux millions Canada on TVA. In September 1988, Dion sang "D'abord, c'est quoi l'amour" on Laser 33-45 on Radio-Canada. Other 1988 television performances included "Ma chambre", "Summertime", and "D'abord, c'est quoi l'amour" on Ad lib. In 1989, Dion performed "Lolita (trop jeune pour aimer)" and "D'amour ou d'amitié" on Ad lib and "Délivre-moi" on Ferland/Nadeau. She also embarked on the Incognito Tour and gave over 80 performances in Quebec between January and December 1988.

== Critical reception ==
AllMusic rated the album three out of five stars.

== Commercial performance ==
Incognito achieved commercial success in Canada. It was certified gold on 23 November 1987 and platinum on 16 September 1988, before reaching double platinum on 31 January 1996 for sales exceeding 200,000 copies. The album also performed well on the Quebec chart, entering in April 1987, spending five weeks at number one, and remaining on the chart for 91 weeks. In Belgium's Wallonia, Incognito entered the Ultratop 200 Albums chart in 1995, following the success of D'eux, and peaked at number 65 on 11 November 1995. Worldwide sales exceeded 500,000 copies.

== Accolades ==
In 1987, Dion was nominated for the Félix Award for Female Vocalist of the Year, and Incognito was nominated for Pop Album of the Year. Jean Roussel won the Félix Award for arranging "Comme un cœur froid" and received two additional nominations for producing and engineering "Incognito". In 1988, Dion won the Félix Award for Female Vocalist of the Year, and "Incognito" was named Most Popular Song of the Year. Thanks to the Incognito Tour, Dion also received the Félix Award for Best Stage Performance of the Year and was nominated for Show of the Year. The tour additionally earned the Félix Award for Stage Director of the Year and received nominations for Stage Designer of the Year, and Lighting Designer of the Year.

Dion was nominated for the Juno Award for Most Promising Female Vocalist of the Year in 1987 and for Female Vocalist of the Year in 1989. She also received three MetroStar Award nominations in 1987 (Female Vocalist of the Year, Young Artist of the Year, Female Personality of the Year) and four in 1988 (Female Vocalist of the Year, Young Artist of the Year, Female Personality of the Year, Jury Award), winning the MetroStar Award for Young Artist of the Year in 1988. Dion's television special Spécial Incognito was nominated for six Gémeaux Awards in 1988 and won two, for Best Cinematography and Best Lighting. Other nominations included Best Direction, Best Production Design, Best Costume Design, and Best Makeup/Hair.

== Track listing ==
| No. | Title | Writer(s) | Producer(s) | Length |
|---|---|---|---|---|
| 1. | "Incognito" | Luc Plamondon; Jean Roussel | Roussel | 4:39 |
| 2. | "Lolita (trop jeune pour aimer)" | Plamondon; Daniel Lavoie | Roussel | 4:19 |
| 3. | "On traverse un miroir" | Isa Minoke; Robert Lafond | Aldo Nova | 4:40 |
| 4. | "Partout je te vois" | Eddy Marnay; Nova | Nova | 4:09 |
| 5. | "Jours de fièvre" | Marnay; Roussel | Roussel | 5:12 |
| 6. | "D'abord, c'est quoi l'amour" | Marnay; Steven Tracey | Nova | 4:23 |
| 7. | "Délivre-moi" | Marnay; E. G. Daily; Harold Faltermeyer | Pierre Bazinet | 4:19 |
| 8. | "Comme un cœur froid" | Marnay; Roussel | Roussel | 5:12 |
| Total length: | | | | 36:53 |

== Notes ==
- The 1988 French edition replaces "Partout je te vois" and "Délivre-moi" with "Ma chambre" and "Ne partez pas sans moi".

== Personnel ==
Adapted from AllMusic.

- Celine Dion – lead vocals, background vocals
- Jean Roussel – producer, arranger, recording, drums, bass synth, keyboards
- Aldo Nova – producer, arranger, recording, mixing, programming, guitars, synth bass, drums, keyboards
- Pierre Bazinet – producer, arranger, mixing, drums
- René Angélil – executive producer, impresario
- Vito Luprano – executive producer
- Ray Fabi – synthesizers, programming
- Michel Corriveau – synthesizers, programming
- Denis Chartrand – keyboards
- Alain Simard – programming
- Daniel Barkbe – Synclavier
- Bill Beaudoin – guitars, keyboards
- Patrick Miles – guitars
- Robert Marchand – guitars
- Sylvian Bolduc – bass guitar
- Alain Barletano – drums
- Pierre Hebert – drums
- Martin Daviault – saxophone, flute
- Patrick Vetter – saxophone
- Isa Minoke – background vocals
- Laurie Niedzielski – background vocals
- Paul Northfield – drum recording
- Alain Deroque – mastering
- J.C. Beaudoin – recording, mixing
- Robin Black – mixing
- Claude Allard – assistant engineer
- Robert Matichak – assistant engineer
- Martin Soldat – design
- Paul Bella – photography
- J.P. Karsenty – photography
- Carol – hair
- Suzane Mia Dumont – press agent

== Charts ==
Chart performance
| Chart (1987–1995) | Peak position |
|---|---|
| Belgian Albums (Ultratop Wallonia) | 65 |
| Quebec Albums (ADISQ) | 1 |

== Certifications and sales ==
Certifications
| Region | Certification | Certified units/sales |
|---|---|---|
| Canada (Music Canada) | 2× Platinum | 200,000^{^} |
Summaries
| Worldwide | — | 500,000 |
^{^} Shipments figures based on certification alone.

== Release history ==
Release history
| Region | Date | Label | Format | Catalog |
|---|---|---|---|---|
| Canada | 2 April 1987 | CBS | CD | WCK 80119 |
| Canada | 2 April 1987 | CBS | Cassette | WCT 80119 |
| Canada | 2 April 1987 | CBS | Vinyl | PFC 80119 |
| France | September 1988 | Carrere | CD | 96600 |
| France | September 1988 | Carrere | Cassette | 76600 |
| France | September 1988 | Carrere | Vinyl | 66600 |
| France | 22 October 1992 | Columbia | CD | 472682 4 |
| France | 22 October 1992 | Columbia | Cassette | 472682 2 |
