= C'est pour toi (song) =

Single by Celine Dion

from the album C'est pour toi
- Language: French
- B-side: "Pour vous"
- Released: August 1985
- Studio: C.R.E. (Paris)
- Genre: Pop
- Length: 3:56
- Label: TBS
- Songwriters: Eddy Marnay; François Orenn
- Producers: Eddy Marnay; Rudi Pascal

Celine Dion singles chronology
"Vois comme c'est beau" (1985)	"C'est pour toi" (1985)	"C'est pour vivre" (1985)

Audio
- "C'est pour toi" on YouTube

"C'est pour toi" (lit. 'It's for you') is the first single from Celine Dion's album C'est pour toi. It was issued in August 1985 in Quebec, Canada. On 21 September 1985, the song entered the Quebec Singles Chart, where it reached number three and remained for 20 weeks. The B-side includes another album track, "Pour vous". A music video was created for the C'est pour toi television special in 1985. The song later appeared on Dion's compilations Les chansons en or (1986) and The Best Of (1988).

== Formats and track listing ==
- Canadian 7-inch single
1. "C'est pour toi" – 3:56
2. "Pour vous" – 3:12

== Charts ==
Chart performance
Chart (1985)	Peak position
Quebec (ADISQ)	3
