= D'abord, c'est quoi l'amour =

Single by Celine Dion

from the album Incognito
- Language: French
- B-side: "Ne partez pas sans moi"
- Released: October 1988
- Studio: Endel-The Synth (Montreal); Ultra-Son (Montreal)
- Genre: Pop
- Length: 4:23
- Label: CBS
- Songwriters: Eddy Marnay; Steven Tracey
- Producer: Aldo Nova

Celine Dion singles chronology
"Jours de fièvre" (1988)	"D'abord, c'est quoi l'amour" (1988)	"Can't Live with You, Can't Live Without You" (1989)

Audio
- "D'abord, c'est quoi l'amour" on YouTube

"D'abord, c'est quoi l'amour" (lit. 'First, what is love') is the sixth single from Celine Dion's album Incognito. It was released in October 1988 in Quebec, Canada.

"D'abord, c'est quoi l'amour" topped the Quebec chart for two weeks. It entered the chart on 17 October 1988 and remained for 24 weeks. The B-side of the single included the 1988 Eurovision Song Contest winner "Ne partez pas sans moi", which had not been previously released in Canada.

== Formats and track listing ==
- Canadian 7-inch single
1. "D'abord, c'est quoi l'amour" – 4:23
2. "Ne partez pas sans moi" – 3:07

== Charts ==
Chart performance
Chart (1988)	Peak position
Quebec (ADISQ)	1
