= Comme un cœur froid =

Single by Celine Dion

from the album Incognito
- Language: French
- B-side: "Ma chambre"
- Released: February 1988
- Studio: Endel-The Synth (Montreal)
- Genre: Pop
- Length: 5:12
- Label: CBS
- Songwriters: Eddy Marnay; Jean Roussel
- Producer: Jean Roussel

Celine Dion singles chronology
"Lolita (trop jeune pour aimer)" (1987)	"Comme un cœur froid" (1988)	"Ne partez pas sans moi" (1988)

Audio
- "Comme un cœur froid" on YouTube

"Comme un cœur froid" (lit. 'Like a frozenheart') is the fourth single from Celine Dion's album Incognito, issued in February 1988 in Quebec, Canada. The track reached number one in Quebec for two weeks. It entered the chart on 6 February 1988 and remained for 24 weeks.

== Background ==
A music video was created for the Incognito TV special, broadcast in September 1987. It was produced by the Canadian Broadcasting Corporation and directed by Jacques Payette.

Following the success of "Comme un cœur froid", Jean Roussel received the Félix Award for Arranger of the Year.

== Formats and track listing ==
- Canadian 7-inch single
1. "Comme un cœur froid" (edit) – 4:28
2. "Ma chambre" – 4:10

== Charts ==
Chart performance
Chart (1988)	Peak position
Quebec (ADISQ)	1
