= On traverse un miroir =

Single by Celine Dion

from the album Incognito
- Language: French
- B-side: "Ma chambre"
- Released: April 1987
- Studio: Ultra-Son (Montreal)
- Genre: Pop
- Length: 4:40
- Label: CBS
- Songwriters: Isa Minoke; Robert Lafond
- Producer: Aldo Nova

Celine Dion singles chronology
"Fais ce que tu voudras" (1986)	"On traverse un miroir" (1987)	"Incognito" (1987)

Audio
- "On traverse un miroir" on YouTube

"On traverse un miroir" (lit. 'We cross a mirror') is the first single from Celine Dion's album Incognito. It was released in April 1987 in Quebec, Canada.

== Background ==
The B-side includes an unreleased song titled "Ma chambre". On 25 April 1987, "On traverse un miroir" entered the Quebec Singles Chart, where it reached number two and remained for 22 weeks.

A music video was produced for the Incognito television special, which aired in September 1987. It was created by the Canadian Broadcasting Corporation and directed by Jacques Payette.

The song was later included on the Canadian edition of Dion's 2005 greatest hits album On ne change pas.

== Formats and track listing ==
- Canadian 7-inch single
1. "On traverse un miroir" – 4:40
2. "Ma chambre" – 4:10

== Charts ==
Chart performance
Chart (1987)	Peak position
Quebec (ADISQ)	2
