= C'est pour vivre =

Single by Celine Dion

from the album C'est pour toi
- Language: French
- B-side: "Tu es là"
- Released: October 1985
- Studio: C.R.E. (Paris)
- Genre: Pop
- Length: 4:02
- Label: TBS; Pathé‑Marconi
- Songwriters: Eddy Marnay; André Popp
- Producers: Eddy Marnay; Rudi Pascal

Celine Dion singles chronology
"C'est pour toi" (1985)	"C'est pour vivre" (1985)	"Dans la main d'un magicien" (1985)

Audio
- "C'est pour vivre" on YouTube

"C'est pour vivre" (lit. 'It's for living') is the second single from Celine Dion's album C'est pour toi. It was issued in October 1985 in France, and later that year in Quebec, Canada. The recording includes the choir V'là l'bon vent. A music video was created for the C'est pour toi television special in 1985.

The French B-side included "Avec toi", but no follow-up album was released in France. The song was later included on the 1988 French compilation The Best of Celine Dion.

== Formats and track listing ==
- Canadian 7-inch single
1. "C'est pour vivre" – 4:02
2. "Tu es là" – 2:43
- French 7-inch single
1. "C'est pour vivre" – 3:58
2. "Avec toi" – 3:23
