= Ne partez pas sans moi =

1988 song by Céline Dion

Single by Celine Dion

from the album The Best of Celine Dion
- Language: French
- B-side: "Ne partez pas sans moi" (instrumental)
- Released: May 1988
- Genre: Pop
- Length: 3:07
- Label: Carrere
- Composer: Atilla Şereftuğ
- Lyricist: Nella Martinetti
- Producers: Atilla Şereftuğ; Urs Peter Keller

Celine Dion singles chronology
"Comme un cœur froid" (1988)	"Ne partez pas sans moi" (1988)	"Délivre-moi" (1988)

Live video
- "Ne partez pas sans moi" on YouTube

"Ne partez pas sans moi" (lit. 'Don't leave without me') is a song recorded by Canadian singer Celine Dion, with music by Atilla Şereftuğ and lyrics by Nella Martinetti. It represented Switzerland in the Eurovision Song Contest 1988, held in Dublin, where it won. It remains the most recent French-language entry to win the contest.

"Ne partez pas sans moi" was issued as a single in selected European markets in May 1988. It reached number one in Belgium for four consecutive weeks, number 11 in Switzerland, and number 36 in France.

== Background ==
=== Conception ===
"Ne partez pas sans moi" was written by Turkish composer Atilla Şereftuğ and Swiss lyricist Nella Martinetti, and recorded by Celine Dion. She also recorded a German-language version titled "Hand in Hand".

=== Eurovision ===
On 6 February 1988, "Ne partez pas sans moi", performed by Dion, competed in the national final organized by the Swiss Broadcasting Corporation (SRG SSR) to select the country's entry for the 33rd edition of the Eurovision Song Contest. The song won the selection, becoming the Swiss entry for the contest.

On 30 April 1988, the Eurovision Song Contest took place at the RDS Simmonscourt Pavilion in Dublin. It was hosted by Radio Telefís Éireann (RTÉ) and broadcast live across Europe. Dion performed "Ne partez pas sans moi" ninth on the night. Şereftuğ conducted the orchestra for the Swiss entry. The broadcast was watched by an estimated 600 million viewers worldwide.

At the close of voting, the song had earned 137 points, winning the contest and finishing one point ahead of the United Kingdom entry "Go" performed by Scott Fitzgerald. It remains one of the closest results in Eurovision history.

=== Aftermath ===
"Ne partez pas sans moi" is often regarded as one of the most recognisable Eurovision entries, partly due to Dion's later international career. It was included on Dion's 1988 album The Best of Celine Dion, released in selected European countries in May 1988. In Canada, the song appeared as the B-side to "D'abord, c'est quoi l'amour". It also appeared on the French edition of Dion's album Incognito. In 2005, it was added to her French compilation album On ne change pas.

As the winning broadcaster, the European Broadcasting Union (EBU) assigned SRG SSR the responsibility of hosting the following edition of the Eurovision Song Contest. The event, held on 6 May 1989, opened with Dion performing "Ne partez pas sans moi" and the premiere of her first English-language single "Where Does My Heart Beat Now". She also presented the trophy to the winner.

"Ne partez pas sans moi" was one of 14 songs selected by Eurovision fans and an EBU reference group, from among the 992 songs that had competed in the contest, to take part in the fiftieth anniversary show Congratulations: 50 Years of the Eurovision Song Contest held on 22 October 2005 in Copenhagen. The song, performed by Elina Nechayeva and Conchita Wurst, appears in the "Eurovision Song-Along" sequence in the 2020 film Eurovision Song Contest: The Story of Fire Saga.

== Commercial performance ==
"Ne partez pas sans moi" debuted at number one in Belgium and remained at the top of the chart for four consecutive weeks; it then dropped directly to number 45. In Switzerland, the song peaked at number 11, and in France it reached number 36.

Although the single sold 200,000 copies in Europe within two days and over 300,000 copies overall, it is regarded as one of the less commercially successful Eurovision winners. It was also the first winning song not released in the United Kingdom or Ireland.

Although not issued as a single in Canada, the song entered the chart in Quebec on 1 October 1988, spending 23 weeks on it and peaking at number 10.

== Formats and track listing ==
- European 7-inch single
1. "Ne partez pas sans moi" – 3:07
2. "Ne partez pas sans moi" (instrumental) – 3:07
- German 7-inch single
1. "Hand in Hand" – 3:08
2. "Hand in Hand" (instrumental) – 3:07

== Charts ==
Chart performance
Chart (1988)	Peak position
Belgium (Hit Parade)	1
European Hot 100 Singles (Music & Media)	49
European Hit Radio (Music & Media)	46
France (SNEP)	36
Netherlands (Dutch Top 40 Tipparade)	3
Netherlands (Single Top 100)	42
Quebec (ADISQ)	10
Switzerland (Schweizer Hitparade)	11
