= Celine Dion in Concert =

1992–1993 concert tour by Céline Dion

- Tour by Celine Dion
- Location: Canada
- Associated album: Celine Dion
- Start date: 14 August 1992
- End date: 23 November 1993
- No. of shows: 51

Celine Dion concert chronology
- Unison Tour (1990–1991); Celine Dion in Concert (1992–1993); The Colour of My Love Tour (1994–1995)

Celine Dion in Concert was the fifth concert tour by Canadian singer Celine Dion. Held between 14 August 1992 and 23 November 1993, the tour supported her second English‑language studio album, Celine Dion (1992). The tour included performances across the United States and Canada, beginning with her first major US touring engagement as the opening act for Michael Bolton and continuing with a series of headlining shows in Canada. The concert series incorporated songs from Dion's early English‑language albums, her French‑language releases, and several cover versions.

== History ==
In the summer of 1992, Dion embarked on her first United States tour as the opening act for Michael Bolton on his Time, Love and Tenderness Tour. The engagement began at the Hollywood Bowl in Los Angeles on 13 July 1992 and concluded at the Pavilion at Star Lake in Pittsburgh on 13 August 1992. Over the course of one month, they performed 18 shows in 20,000‑seat venues. Dion also joined Bolton on stage for a duet performance of "Hold On, I'm Comin'".

Between August 1992 and November 1993, Dion toured extensively across Canada. On 15 August 1992, she performed before more than 45,000 people at a major outdoor concert held at Parc des Îles on Saint Helen's Island to celebrate the 350th anniversary of Montreal. She sang duets with Aaron Neville, Peabo Bryson, and the Atlanta Super Choir. The event was later broadcast on the CBC program Les beaux dimanches.

Dion's typical concert lasted approximately 90 minutes and presented a set of about 15 songs. The set list focused primarily on material from Celine Dion, accompanied by selections from Unison and Dion chante Plamondon. She also performed three cover songs: "Sorry Seems to Be the Hardest Word", "Can't Help Falling in Love", and "(You Make Me Feel Like) A Natural Woman".

== Opening acts ==
- Anthony Kavanagh (Quebec)
- Lennie Gallant (Canada)

== Set list ==
The following songs were performed during various dates of the tour.

1. "Des mots qui sonnent"
2. "Where Does My Heart Beat Now"
3. "Sorry Seems to Be the Hardest Word"
4. "Love Can Move Mountains"
5. "L'amour existe encore"
6. "Je danse dans ma tête"
7. "Unison"
8. "If You Asked Me To"
9. "Did You Give Enough Love"
10. "Beauty and the Beast"
11. "Water from the Moon"
12. "With This Tear"
13. "(You Make Me Feel Like) A Natural Woman"
14. "Nothing Broken but My Heart"
15. "Can't Help Falling in Love"

== Tour dates ==
List of 1992 shows
Date (1992)	City	Country	Venue
14 August (Note: Part of the Grand Prix de Trois-Rivières.)	Trois-Rivières	Canada	Colisée de Trois-Rivières
15 August (Note: Part of the Montréal au rythme des Amériques.)	Montreal	Canada	Parc des Îles
17 August	Ottawa	Canada	National Arts Centre
18 August	Ottawa	Canada	National Arts Centre
21 August	Quebec City	Canada	Agora du Vieux-Port
22 August	Quebec City	Canada	Agora du Vieux-Port
24 August (Note: Part of the Canadian National Exhibition.)	Toronto	Canada	CNE Bandshell
28 August	Chandler	Canada	L'aréna de Chandler
6 September (Note: Part of the Gatineau Hot Air Balloon Festival.)	Gatineau	Canada	Parc de la Baie
23 November	Quebec City	Canada	Théâtre Capitole
24 November	Quebec City	Canada	Théâtre Capitole
1 December	Quebec City	Canada	Théâtre Capitole
2 December	Quebec City	Canada	Théâtre Capitole
3 December	Quebec City	Canada	Théâtre Capitole
12 December	Drummondville	Canada	Centre Marcel-Dionne
13 December	Sherbrooke	Canada	Maurice O'Brady Theatre
15 December	Ottawa	Canada	Rogers Centre Ottawa
17 December	Jonquière	Canada	Salle François-Brassard
18 December	Jonquière	Canada	Salle François-Brassard
19 December	Jonquière	Canada	Salle François-Brassard
22 December	Shawinigan	Canada	Centre des Arts de Shawinigan

List of 1993 shows
Date (1993)	City	Country	Venue
15 January	Quebec City	Canada	Théâtre Capitole
16 January	Quebec City	Canada	Théâtre Capitole
17 January	Quebec City	Canada	Théâtre Capitole
2 March	Quebec City	Canada	Théâtre Capitole
5 March	Quebec City	Canada	Théâtre Capitole
6 March	Quebec City	Canada	Théâtre Capitole
7 March	Quebec City	Canada	Théâtre Capitole
9 March	Quebec City	Canada	Théâtre Capitole
10 March	Quebec City	Canada	Théâtre Capitole
23 March	London	Canada	Alumni Hall
25 March	Toronto	Canada	Massey Hall
26 March	Toronto	Canada	Massey Hall
27 March	Hamilton	Canada	Hamilton Place Theatre
2 April	Montreal	Canada	Montreal Forum
3 April	Montreal	Canada	Montreal Forum
4 April	Montreal	Canada	Montreal Forum
6 April	Montreal	Canada	Montreal Forum
7 April	Montreal	Canada	Montreal Forum
9 April	Quebec City	Canada	Théâtre Capitole
11 April	Edmonton	Canada	Northern Alberta Jubilee Auditorium
12 April	Calgary	Canada	Jack Singer Hall
14 April	Vancouver	Canada	Queen Elizabeth Theatre
17 April	Winnipeg	Canada	Walker Theatre
20 April	Thunder Bay	Canada	Thunder Bay Community Auditorium
22 April	Greater Sudbury	Canada	Grand Theatre Centre
25 April	Ottawa	Canada	National Arts Centre
7 May	Moncton	Canada	Moncton Coliseum
8 May	Fredericton	Canada	Aitken University Centre
9 May	Halifax	Canada	Halifax Metro Centre
11 May	St. John's	Canada	Memorial Stadium
7 September (Note: The Quebec City concerts on 7–8 September included songs from the upcoming The Colour of My Love album and were filmed for a TV special.)	Quebec City	Canada	Théâtre Capitole
8 September	Quebec City	Canada	Théâtre Capitole
19 October	Rivière-du-Loup	Canada	Cultural Centre
20 October	Rimouski	Canada	Cultural Centre
22 October	Chicoutimi	Canada	Dufour Auditorium
25 October	Sherbrooke	Canada	Maurice O'Brady Theatre
26 October	Drummondville	Canada	Cultural Centre
29 October (Note: The Caraquet and Campbellton concerts were rescheduled from 4 and 5 May due to the death of Dion's niece, Karine.)	Caraquet	Canada	Carrefour Theatre
30 October	Campbellton	Canada	Memorial Civic Center
2 November	Trois-Rivières	Canada	Thompson Theatre
3 November	Trois-Rivières	Canada	Thompson Theatre
18 November	Cornwall	Canada	Civic Complex
21 November (Note: The 21 November Quebec City show was rescheduled from 5 September.)	Quebec City	Canada	Théâtre Capitole
23 November	Quebec City	Canada	Théâtre Capitole
