= Celine Dion (album) =

Studio album by Celine Dion
- Released: 30 March 1992
- Recorded: October 1991 – February 1992
- Studios: Bunny Hop (Sherman Oaks); Criterion; Encore (Burbank); Lighthouse Recorders (Hollywood); Mad Hatter (Los Angeles); Music Grinder; Oceanway Recording (Hollywood); Plant Recording (Sausalito); Red Zone (Burbank); Right Track Recording (New York); Morin Heights (Quebec); The Plant Recording (Sausalito); The Power Station (New York); Village Records
- Genre: Pop
- Length: 61:04
- Labels: Columbia; Epic
- Producers: Walter Afanasieff; Humberto Gatica; Guy Roche; Ric Wake

Celine Dion chronology
Dion chante Plamondon (1991)	Celine Dion (1992)	The Colour of My Love (1993)

Singles from Celine Dion
- 1. "Beauty and the Beast" Released: 28 October 1991; 2. "If You Asked Me To" Released: March 1992; 3. "Nothing Broken but My Heart" Released: July 1992; 4. "Love Can Move Mountains" Released: October 1992; 5. "Water from the Moon" Released: February 1993

Celine Dion is the eleventh studio album by Canadian singer Celine Dion and her second English‑language album. Released on 30 March 1992 by Columbia Records and Epic Records, it includes the Grammy and Academy Award‑winning duet "Beauty and the Beast" along with the singles "If You Asked Me To" and "Love Can Move Mountains". Produced by Walter Afanasieff, Ric Wake, Guy Roche, and Humberto Gatica, the album reached number one in Quebec and number three in Canada, where it was certified diamond for shipments of more than one million copies. At the 35th Annual Grammy Awards, Celine Dion was nominated for Best Female Pop Vocal Performance. Worldwide sales are estimated at over five million copies.

== Background and content ==
Dion's international breakthrough grew when she and Peabo Bryson recorded the title song for the Walt Disney Pictures animated film Beauty and the Beast (1991). The duet helped define a musical direction Dion continued to pursue, with soft‑rock ballads shaped by orchestral arrangements and a strong vocal focus. The song became her second US top‑ten hit and received several major awards, raising her profile in the anglophone market.

For her eponymous album, Dion worked with a mostly new group of writers and producers. Five tracks were written by Diane Warren, while "With This Tear" was composed for her by Prince. It was among the final songs recorded for the album, replacing a planned cover of "Calling You". Production was led mainly by Walter Afanasieff, Ric Wake, and Roche, giving the album a polished, contemporary pop sound.

By 1992, the success of Unison (1990), the release of Celine Dion, and numerous media appearances had brought Dion into mainstream popularity in North America, supporting her long‑term aim of entering the anglophone market. During this time, her personal life also changed, as her professional relationship with René Angélil developed into a romantic one, although the couple kept it private due to their 26‑year age difference.

The European edition of Celine Dion includes "Where Does My Heart Beat Now" as a bonus track. The album was reissued in Australia on 7 September 1992 with a bonus disc containing four singles from Unison. "Send Me a Lover", recorded during the album sessions, was later released on the charity compilation Kumbaya Album 1994.

To promote the album, Dion toured as the opening act for Michael Bolton on his Time, Love and Tenderness Tour in the United States during summer 1992. From August 1992 to March 1993, she toured Canada with her Celine Dion in Concert tour.

== Singles ==
Following the success of "Beauty and the Beast", the duet was included on Celine Dion, contributing to a strong run of singles from the album. The first commercial release, "If You Asked Me To"—a reinterpretation of the 1989 Patti LaBelle recording—became a major hit in both Canada and the United States. It reached number one on the Canadian Top Singles chart and number four on the Billboard Hot 100, marking one of Dion's earliest significant English‑language successes.

The album's momentum continued with "Nothing Broken but My Heart", which peaked at number three in Canada and reached number 29 in the United States. "Love Can Move Mountains" followed, rising to number two in Canada and number 36 in the United States. "Water from the Moon" also performed well, reaching number seven in Canada.

In July 1993, the promotional single "Did You Give Enough Love" was released in Canada, accompanied by a music video, and reached number 17. Collectively, these singles reflected Dion's growing presence on North American radio and her increasing recognition as a leading pop vocalist of the early 1990s.

== Critical reception ==
Professional ratings
Review scores
Source	Rating
AllMusic	4/5 stars
Calgary Herald	C+
Chicago Tribune	3.5/4 stars
Robert Christgau	D+
Entertainment Weekly	B−
Gavin Report	positive
Orlando Sentinel	2/3 stars
RPM	positive

Celine Dion received generally positive critical response, with many reviewers noting Dion's vocal skill, the album's clear stylistic approach, and its polished pop production.

Stephen Thomas Erlewine of AllMusic described the album as "even stronger and more accomplished" than Dion's American debut, pointing to its smooth arrangements and confident performances. Arion Berger of Entertainment Weekly highlighted Dion's technical control, writing that even on demanding material such as Prince's "With This Tear", she sings with clarity and precision.

Jan DeKnock of the Chicago Tribune wrote that Dion's growing ease with English allowed her to "deliver the emotional nuances of a lyric", placing her among the leading pop vocalists of the period. Parry Gettelman of the Orlando Sentinel noted her strength on the album's dance‑pop tracks, including "Love Can Move Mountains", "Did You Give Enough Love", and "Little Bit of Love".

Tim Evans of RPM wrote that Celine Dion is a "terrific album with many highpoints", citing the strongest track "Water from the Moon", as well as the upbeat, radio‑friendly songs "Love Can Move Mountains" and "Little Bit of Love". According to Ron Fell from the Gavin Report, Dion "soars with amazing grace through a workout set aside for only the most glorious and gifted voices in contemporary music" and "takes no prisoners in this souled‑out set". He praised the "future hits" "Love Can Move Mountains" and "Little Bit of Love", as well as the "ballads of exquisite sentimentality" "Water from the Moon" and "If You Could". Fell also wrote that Walter Afanasieff took Dion to "new creative highs".

Although music critic Robert Christgau gave the album a less favourable review, his assessment differed from the wider critical reception, which viewed Celine Dion as an important step in her English‑language career.

== Commercial performance ==
Celine Dion was a major commercial success, ultimately selling over five million copies worldwide. The album marked a turning point in Dion's English‑language career, outperforming her earlier releases and helping establish her as an emerging international pop artist.

In the United States, Celine Dion became her most commercially successful album up to that point. As of May 2016, it had sold 2.4 million copies according to Nielsen SoundScan, with an additional 624,000 units sold through the BMG Music Club. It was certified double platinum by the RIAA and reached number 34 on the Billboard 200. Its US performance was supported by strong radio play, soundtrack exposure, and extensive promotional activity.

In Canada, the album achieved major success, topping the chart in Quebec for six weeks, peaking at number three nationally, and earning a diamond certification from the CRIA for sales of one million copies. Its strong domestic performance reinforced Dion's position as one of Canada's leading pop artists and supported her transition into the anglophone market.

Internationally, Celine Dion charted in several territories. It reached number 15 in Australia, number 31 in New Zealand, number 59 in Japan, and number 70 in the United Kingdom. It received platinum certification from the ARIA and gold certifications in both the UK and Japan. Its global sales were strengthened by the international reach of its singles and Dion's growing reputation in pop and adult contemporary formats. Dion also received her first World Music Award for Best Selling Canadian Female Recording Artist of the Year.

The album's most successful single, "Beauty and the Beast", peaked at number nine on the Billboard Hot 100 and was certified gold in the United States. Its chart performance was supported by the song's Academy Award and Grammy Award wins. Other singles that reached the US top 40 included "If You Asked Me To" (number four), "Nothing Broken but My Heart" (number 29), and "Love Can Move Mountains" (number 36). "Water from the Moon" peaked at number 11 on the US Adult Contemporary chart, while in Canada, "Did You Give Enough Love" reached number 17 on the RPM Top Singles chart.

== Accolades ==
Celine Dion received numerous awards and nominations, reflecting its critical and commercial impact. It was nominated for the Juno Award for Album of the Year and the Grammy Award for Best Female Pop Vocal Performance. Dion won the Female Vocalist of the Year and was nominated for Canadian Entertainer of the Year. She also received the Billboard International Creative Achievement Award and a nomination for Hot Adult Contemporary Artist. At the Félix Awards, she won Artist of the Year Achieving the Most Success in a Language Other Than French and Artist of the Year Achieving the Most Success Outside Quebec. Internationally, she won the World Music Award for World's Best Selling Canadian Female Artist of the Year and received the Governor General's Medal of Recognition for her contribution to Canadian culture.

"Beauty and the Beast" received extensive recognition, winning the Grammy Award for Best Pop Performance by a Duo or Group with Vocals and the Grammy Award for Best Song Written Specifically for a Motion Picture or Television, and earning nominations for both Record of the Year and Song of the Year. It also won the Academy Award for Best Original Song, the Golden Globe Award for Best Original Song, the Juno Award for Single of the Year, the ASCAP Film and Television Music Award for Most Performed Song from Motion Picture, and the ASCAP Pop Award for Most Performed Song.

"If You Asked Me To" won the ASCAP Pop Award for Most Performed Song and was nominated for the Juno Award for Single of the Year and the Billboard Music Award for Hot Adult Contemporary Single of the Year. "Nothing Broken but My Heart" also received an ASCAP Pop Award. "Love Can Move Mountains" won the Juno Award for Dance Recording of the Year and was nominated for Single of the Year. Dion's performance of the song at the Juno Awards of 1993 earned a nomination for the Gemini Award for Best Performance in a Variety Program or Series.

== Track listing ==
No.	Title	Writer(s)	Producer(s)	Length
1.	"Introduction"	Walter Afanasieff	Afanasieff	1:14
2.	"Love Can Move Mountains"	Diane Warren	Ric Wake	4:53
3.	"Show Some Emotion"	Andrew Gold; Gregory Prestopino; Brock Walsh	Afanasieff	4:29
4.	"If You Asked Me To"	Warren	Guy Roche	3:55
5.	"If You Could See Me Now"	Afanasieff; John Bettis	Afanasieff	5:07
6.	"Halfway to Heaven"	Franne Golde; Nicky Holland; Hal David	Afanasieff	5:05
7.	"Did You Give Enough Love"	Seth Swirsky; Arnie Roman	Wake	4:22
8.	"If I Were You"	Shelly Peiken; Roman	Wake	5:07
9.	"Beauty and the Beast" (with Peabo Bryson)	Alan Menken; Howard Ashman	Afanasieff	4:04
10.	"I Love You, Goodbye"	Warren	Roche	3:34
11.	"Little Bit of Love"	Claude Gaudette; Andy Scott	Humberto Gatica	4:27
12.	"Water from the Moon"	Warren	Roche; Afanasieff^{[a]}	4:40
13.	"With This Tear"	Prince	Afanasieff	4:12
14.	"Nothing Broken but My Heart"	Warren	Afanasieff	5:55
Total length:				61:04

=== Notes ===
- ^{^a} signifies an additional producer
- The second European edition includes the bonus track "Where Does My Heart Beat Now".
- The second Australian edition includes a bonus disc featuring "Where Does My Heart Beat Now", "(If There Was) Any Other Way", "Unison", and "The Last to Know".

== Personnel ==
Adapted from AllMusic.

- Celine Dion – lead vocals, spoken word, background vocals
- Walter Afanasieff – arranger, bass, guitar, acoustic guitar, keyboards, orchestral arrangements, organ, Hammond organ, producer, programming, Synclavier, synthesizer, synthesizer bass, vocal arrangement, vocal producer
- Ken Allardyce – engineer
- René Angélil – management
- Israel Baker – violin
- Marilyn Baker – viola
- Mickey Baker – viola
- Greg Bannan – production coordination
- David Barratt – production coordination
- Kitty Beethoven – background vocals
- Fred "Re-Run" Berry – flugelhorn
- Frederick Berry – flugelhorn, soloist
- Kyle Bess – engineer
- David Betancourt – engineer
- Rick Bieder – engineer
- Teruko Brooks – violin
- Peabo Bryson – guest artist, vocals
- Robbie Buchanan – arranger, keyboards, piano
- Bob Cadway – engineer, mixing, tracking
- Bruce Calder – engineer
- Russ Cantor – violin
- Dana Jon Chappelle – engineer, mixing
- Gary Cirimelli – programming, Synclavier, background vocals
- Ronald Clark – violin
- Liz Constantine – background vocals
- Van Coppock – assistant engineer
- Orion Crawford – copyist
- Joey Diggs – background vocals
- John Doelp – executive producer
- Nancy Donald – art direction
- Bruce Dukov – violin
- Felipe Elgueta – engineer
- Paul Ericksen – engineer
- Clare Fischer – arranger, conductor, string arrangements
- Chris Fogel – assistant engineer
- Arne Frager – string engineer
- Kenny G – guest artist, soprano saxophone
- Bruce Gaitsch – guitar
- Pamela Gates – violin
- Humberto Gatica – engineer, mixing, producer
- Claude Gaudette – arranger, keyboards, programming
- Gary Gertzweig – violin
- Michael Gilbert – engineer
- Edward Green – violin
- Sandy Griffith – background vocals
- Noel Hazen – assistant engineer
- Mark Hensley – engineer
- Dan Hetzel – engineer
- Jim Hughart – contrabass
- Larry Jacobs – background vocals
- Davida Johnson – violin
- Jimmy Johnson – bass
- Jude Johnson – cello
- Melisa Kary – background vocals
- Neill King – engineer
- Ren Klyce – programming, sampling, Synclavier
- Dave Koz – guest artist, saxophone
- Matthew "Boomer" La Monica – engineer
- Manny Lacarrubba – engineer
- Michael Landau – guitar
- Norma Leonard – violin
- Mario Lucy – assistant engineer, engineer
- Vito Luprano – executive producer
- Patrick MacDougall – mixing
- Margot MacLaine – viola
- Earl Madison – cello
- Larry Mah – engineer
- Brian Malouf – mixing
- Jean McClain – background vocals
- Casey McMackin – assistant engineer
- Vladimir Meller – mastering
- Betty Moor – violin
- Jorge Moraga – viola
- Ralph Morrison III – violin
- Michael Nowak – viola
- Nils Oliver – cello
- Rafael Padilla – percussion
- Victoria Pearson – photography
- Joel Peskin – oboe, synthesizer
- Ken Phillips – production coordination
- Brian Pollack – assistant engineer, engineer
- Simon Pressey – engineer
- Vicki Randle – background vocals
- Claytoven Richardson – background vocals
- John "J.R." Robinson – drums
- Guy Roche – arranger, engineer, keyboards, producer, synthesizer
- Alejandro Rodríguez – engineer
- Harry Scorzo – violin
- Frederick Seykora – cello
- Dan Shea – keyboards, programming
- David Shea – keyboards, synthesizer
- Paul Shure – violin
- David Stenske – viola
- Mick Stern – engineer
- Robert Stone – contrabass
- Robert Jeffrey Stone – double bass
- Barbara Stout – production coordination
- Rich Tancredi – arranger
- Pamela Thompkins – violin
- Michael Thompson – guitar
- Jeanie Tracy – background vocals
- Jeffrey "C.J." Vanston – keyboards
- Alan de Veritch – viola
- Ric Wake – arranger, producer
- Francine Walsh – violin
- Diane Warren – background vocals
- Frank Wolf – engineer
- Terry Wood – background vocals
- Thomas R. Yezzi – engineer
- Richard Zuckerman – executive producer

== Charts ==
=== Weekly charts ===
Weekly chart performance
Chart (1992–1998)	Peak position
Australian Albums (ARIA)	15
Canada Top Albums/CDs (RPM)	4
Canadian Albums (The Record)	3
Japanese Albums (Oricon)	59
New Zealand Albums (RMNZ)	31
Quebec (ADISQ)	1
UK Albums (Official Charts)	70
US Billboard 200	34
US Top 200 Pop Albums (Cash Box)	28

=== Year-end charts ===
1992 year-end chart performance
Chart (1992)	Position
Canada Top Albums/CDs (RPM)	16
US Billboard 200	92

1993 year-end chart performance
Chart (1993)	Position
Canada Top Albums/CDs (RPM)	97

== Certifications and sales ==
Certifications
Region	Certification	Certified units/sales
Australia (ARIA)	Platinum	70,000^{‡}
Canada (Music Canada)	Diamond	1,000,000^{^}
Japan (RIAJ)	Gold	100,000^{^}
United Kingdom (BPI)	Gold	100,000^{^}
United States (RIAA)	2× Platinum	3,024,000 (Note: As of May 2016, Celine Dion has sold 2,400,000 copies in the United States according to Nielsen SoundScan, with an additional 624,000 units sold at BMG Music Club. SoundScan does not count albums sold through clubs like the BMG Music Service, which were significantly popular in the 1990s.)
Summaries
Worldwide	—	5,000,000
^{^} Shipments figures based on certification alone.^{‡} Sales+streaming figures based on certification alone.

== Release history ==
Release history
Region	Date	Label	Format	Catalog	Edition
Canada	30 March 1992	Columbia	CD; cassette	52473	14 tracks
United States	31 March 1992	Epic	CD; cassette	52473	14 tracks
Japan	21 May 1992	SMEJ	CD	ESCA-5587	14 tracks
United Kingdom	8 June 1992	Epic	CD; LP; cassette	471508	14 tracks
Australia	22 June 1992	Epic	CD; cassette	471508	14 tracks
Australia	7 September 1992	Epic	CD; cassette	471508	bonus disc
Germany	3 December 1992	Columbia	CD; LP; cassette		
United Kingdom	4 January 1993	Epic	CD; LP; cassette	4715089	15 tracks

== See also ==
- List of Diamond-certified albums in Canada
