= Unison (video) =

Video by Celine Dion
- Released: 2 July 1991
- Recorded: 1990–1991
- Genre: Pop
- Length: 45:00
- Languages: English; French
- Labels: Columbia; Epic

Celine Dion chronology
Unison (1991)	The Colour of My Love Concert (1995)

Unison is the first home video by Canadian singer Celine Dion, released on VHS on 2 July 1991 by Columbia Records and Epic Records. The program presents a selection of music videos from Dion's English-language debut album, Unison (1990), including an alternate version of "Where Does My Heart Beat Now". It also includes interview segments filmed at Dion's home.

Several videos, including "Délivre-moi", "Have a Heart", and "Calling You", were recorded live during the Unison Tour at the Winter Garden Theatre in Toronto. These performances were later broadcast in a 1991 MusiMax television special. The home video was issued in both English and French versions, each containing interview material recorded specifically for that edition.

== Content ==
The release includes music videos from Unison, among them a special version of "Where Does My Heart Beat Now" that combines footage from the Canadian black-and-white video with material from the US performance version. It also presents live renditions of songs not included on the album, such as "Calling You" and "Délivre-moi".

The US edition contains the 1991 American version of "(If There Was) Any Other Way", while the Canadian edition uses the 1990 Canadian version. Three live videos — "Délivre-moi", "Have a Heart", and "Calling You" — were recorded during the Unison Tour at the Winter Garden Theatre and later aired as part of a MusiMax special. The Canadian release was issued in both English and French, with each version containing its own interview segments.

== Commercial performance ==
Unison was released in several countries throughout 1991 and was certified gold in Canada on 1 May 1992.

== Track listing ==
No.	Title	Director(s)	Length
1.	"Where Does My Heart Beat Now" (special version)	Rob Quartly^{[a]}; David Phillips^{[b]}
2.	"(If There Was) Any Other Way"	Derek Case^{[a]}; Dominic Orlando^{[b]}
3.	"The Last to Know"	Orlando
4.	"Délivre-moi" (live)
5.	"Have a Heart" (live)
6.	"Calling You" (live)
7.	"Unison"	Robin Miller

== Notes ==
- ^{^a} signifies the Canadian version
- ^{^b} signifies the US version

== Certifications ==
Certifications
Region	Certification	Certified units/sales
Canada (Music Canada)	Gold	5,000^{^}
^{^} Shipments figures based on certification alone.

== Release history ==
Release history
Region	Date	Label	Format	Catalog
United States	2 July 1991	Epic	VHS	49920
Canada	11 July 1991	Columbia	VHS	80164 (English); 80165 (French)
Australia	1991	Epic	VHS	49920
