= Any Other Way =

Any Other Way may refer to:

- "Any Other Way", song by William Bell (singer), W. Bell, 1962, covered by Jackie Shane, Chuck Jackson and Bruce Springsteen.
- "Any Other Way", song by B.B. King, C. Otis, from Guess Who (album)
- "Any Other Way", song by The Zombies from Breathe Out, Breathe In
- "Any Other Way", song by We The Kings from Somewhere Somehow (album)
- "(If There Was) Any Other Way", a 1990 song by Celine Dion from Unison
