= Nothing Broken but My Heart =

Single by Celine Dion

from the album Celine Dion
- B-side: "Unison" (single mix)
- Released: 3 August 1992
- Studio: Right Track (New York); The Plant (Los Angeles)
- Genre: Pop
- Length: 5:55
- Label: Columbia; Epic
- Songwriter: Diane Warren
- Producer: Walter Afanasieff

Celine Dion singles chronology
"If You Asked Me To" (1992)	"Nothing Broken but My Heart" (1992)	"Love Can Move Mountains" (1992)

Music video
- "Nothing Broken but My Heart" on YouTube

"Nothing Broken but My Heart" is a song by Canadian singer Celine Dion, recorded for her second English-language album, Celine Dion (1992). It was issued as the album's third single, except in Australia, where it served as the album's fourth single. Written by Diane Warren and produced by Walter Afanasieff, it reached the top of the adult contemporary charts in both the United States and Canada. The song became Dion's second single to reach number one on the US Billboard Hot Adult Contemporary Tracks chart. It peaked at number three in Canada and number 29 in the United States. In 1994, "Nothing Broken but My Heart" received an ASCAP Pop Award for being among the most performed songs in the United States.

== Critical reception ==
Larry Flick from Billboard described the track as a "melodramatic power ballad", adding that its "booming production values and a tearful vocal will push all the right buttons". Randy Clark from Cashbox wrote that it is "full of Celine's brilliant power, and sounds like it might be another AC success". Rufer and Fell from the Gavin Report stated, "A Diane Warren song sung by Ms. Dion's velvet hammer voice. An unbeatable combination does it again". In a retrospective review, Christopher Smith of Talk About Pop Music wrote that it "throws everything possible in, some electric guitars, Celine's soaring vocals, and a beautiful, long fade out".

== Music video ==
The accompanying music video for "Nothing Broken but My Heart" was created for the edited version, as the album track runs almost six minutes. Released in August 1992, it shows actors rehearsing scenes from Romeo and Juliet. It was directed by Lyne Charlebois and filmed in Montreal. The video was later uploaded to Dion's official channel in August 2012 and has accumulated more than 5.7 million views.

== Live performances ==
Dion performed the song for the first time on 14 July 1992 during her appearance on The Tonight Show with Jay Leno. She later sang it at the MuchMusic Canadian Video Awards in September 1992. The song was also included in her Celine Dion in Concert tour setlist in 1992 and 1993.

== Formats and track listing ==
- Australian cassette and CD single
1. "Nothing Broken but My Heart" – 5:55
2. "Unison" – 4:12
- Canadian and US 7-inch and cassette single; Japanese 3-inch CD single
1. "Nothing Broken but My Heart" (radio edit) – 4:12
2. "Unison" (single mix) – 4:04

== Credits and personnel ==
- Celine Dion – lead and background vocals
- Diane Warren – songwriting
- Walter Afanasieff – producer, arranger, keyboards, synthesized bass, drum and rhythm programming
- Michael Landau – guitars
- Ren Klyce – Akai and Synclavier programming
- Gary Cirimelli – Macintosh and Synclavier programming, background vocals
- Dan Shea – additional keyboards, Macintosh programming
- Claytoven Richardson – background vocals
- Melisa Kary – background vocals
- Jeanie Tracey – background vocals
- Vicki Randle – background vocals
- Kitty Beethoven – background vocals
- Sandy Griffith – background vocals
- Dana Jon Chappelle – engineer, mixer
- Neill King – second engineer
- Mark Hensley – second engineer
- Bruce Colder – second engineer
- Michael Gilbert – second engineer
- Barbara Stout – production coordinator

== Charts ==
=== Weekly charts ===
Weekly chart performance
Chart (1992–1993)	Peak position
Australia (ARIA)	192
Canada Top Singles (RPM)	3
Canada Adult Contemporary (RPM)	1
Canada Retail Singles (The Record)	19
Canada Contemporary Hit Radio (The Record)	7
Quebec Radio Songs (ADISQ)	3
US Billboard Hot 100	29
US Adult Contemporary (Billboard)	1
US Pop Airplay (Billboard)	26
US Cash Box Top 100	22

=== Year-end charts ===
Year-end chart performance
Chart (1992)	Position
Canada Top Singles (RPM)	23
Canada Adult Contemporary (RPM)	2
US Adult Contemporary (Billboard)	23

== Release history ==
Region	Date	Format(s)	Label	Ref.
Japan	21 August 1992	Mini CD	SMEJ	
United States	8 September 1992	7-inch vinyl; cassette	Epic	
Australia	25 January 1993	CD; cassette	Epic	

== See also ==
- List of Hot Adult Contemporary number ones of 1992
