= Unison Tour =

1990–1991 concert tour by Celine Dion

- Tour by Celine Dion
- Location: Canada
- Associated album: Unison
- Start date: 10 October 1990
- End date: 9 October 1991
- No. of shows: 75

Celine Dion concert chronology
- Incognito Tour (1988–1989); Unison Tour (1990–1991); Celine Dion in Concert (1992–1993)

The Unison Tour was the fourth concert tour by Canadian singer Celine Dion, launched to promote her first English‑language studio album, Unison (1990). Spanning three legs between 10 October 1990 and 9 October 1991, the Unison Tour included 75 concerts across Canada, covering both Francophone and Anglophone regions.

== History ==
In September 1990, RPM magazine reported that Dion would be heading across Canada on her first nationwide tour. She was scheduled to appear at 2,000 to 3,000‑seat venues, beginning in Quebec and moving from the east coast to the west. The tour, produced by Donald K. Tarlton, was originally planned to kick off in Montreal on 16 October 1990.

The tour consisted of three legs. The first Quebec leg began on 10 October 1990 in Drummondville and concluded on 16 December 1990 in Montreal. During the 13 October 1990 performance in Sherbrooke, Dion temporarily lost her voice for the second time in her career, the first having occurred during the Incognito Tour. As a result, three concerts scheduled for 16–18 October 1990 at Théâtre Saint-Denis in Montreal were postponed.

On 20 December 1990, the remainder of the tour was postponed for approximately two months due to Dion's continued recovery from laryngitis and fatigue following a demanding series of performances. Shows in Quebec City, Sherbrooke, Ottawa, and Trois-Rivières planned for early 1991 were rescheduled for the spring. The second leg, running from February to April 1991, focused on English‑speaking regions of Canada, including a concert at the Winter Garden Theatre in Toronto. The third and final leg took place between 19 May and 9 October 1991, comprising 37 concerts in 25 cities.

== Opening acts ==
- François Massicotte (select dates)

== Set list ==
The following songs were performed during various dates of the tour.

1. "Love by Another Name"
2. "If Love Is Out the Question"
3. "Have a Heart"
4. "Délivre-moi"
5. "D'abord, c'est quoi l'amour?"
6. "I Feel Too Much"
7. "Hello Mégo"
8. "Can't Live with You, Can't Live Without You"
9. "Calling You"
10. "(If There Was) Any Other Way"
11. "The Last to Know"
12. "Unison"
13. "Where Does My Heart Beat Now"

== Tour dates ==
List of 1990 concerts
Date (1990)	City	Country	Venue
10 October	Drummondville	Canada	Centre Marcel Dionne
11 October	Drummondville	Canada	Centre Marcel Dionne
12 October	Sherbrooke	Canada	Salle Maurice-O'Bready
13 October	Sherbrooke	Canada	Salle Maurice-O'Bready
19 October	Montreal	Canada	Théâtre Saint-Denis
20 October	Montreal	Canada	Théâtre Saint-Denis
22 October	Montreal	Canada	Théâtre Saint-Denis
23 October	Montreal	Canada	Théâtre Saint-Denis
24 October	Montreal	Canada	Théâtre Saint-Denis
7 November	Montreal	Canada	Théâtre Saint-Denis
11 November	Montreal	Canada	Théâtre Saint-Denis
20 November	Montreal	Canada	Théâtre Saint-Denis
23 November	Montreal	Canada	Théâtre Saint-Denis
24 November	Montreal	Canada	Théâtre Saint-Denis
6 December	Quebec City	Canada	Grand Théâtre de Québec
12 December	Montreal	Canada	Théâtre Saint-Denis
16 December	Montreal	Canada	Théâtre Saint-Denis

List of 1991 concerts
Date (1991)	City	Country	Venue
5 March	Vancouver	Canada	86th Street Music Hall
8 March	St. Albert	Canada	Arden Theater
9 March	Calgary	Canada	Southern Alberta Jubilee Auditorium
11 March	Winnipeg	Canada	Walker Theatre
15 March	Toronto	Canada	Winter Garden Theatre
4 June	Quebec City	Canada	Grand Théâtre de Québec
19 June	Montreal	Canada	Montreal Forum
1 August	Longueuil	Canada	Marie-Victorin Waterfront Park
3 August	Quebec City	Canada	Agora du Vieux-Port
25 August	Toronto	Canada	The Bandshell
28 August	Sept-Îles	Canada	Le Cégep de Sept-Îles
29 August	Baie-Comeau	Canada	Théâtre de Baie-Comeau
31 August	Quebec City	Canada	Agora du Vieux-Port de Québec
9 October	Halifax	Canada	Cardinal Cushing Auditorium

== Broadcasts and recordings ==
The 1991 performance at the Winter Garden Theatre in Toronto was filmed and later broadcast on MusiMax. Three songs—"Délivre-moi", "Have a Heart", and "Calling You"—were included on the Unison home video release.

On 19 June 1991, Dion performed a special "Ten Year Career Concert" at the Montreal Forum before an audience of 16,000, accompanied by the Montreal Symphony Orchestra.

== Personnel ==
Adapted from the credits in the official tour brochure.

- Celine Dion – lead vocals

=== Band ===
- Claude "Mégo" Lemay – keyboards, vocals, guitars
- Peter Barbeau – drums
- Sylvain Bolduc – bass
- Yves Frulla – keyboards
- Pierre Gauthier – guitars

=== Production ===
- René Angélil – management
- Suzanne Gingue – tour manager
- Yves Aucoin – lighting design
- Eric Lapointe – lighting director
- Steve Baird – intellabeam technician
- Adrian Pascau – lighting technician
- Yves Savoies – house sound
- Charles Ethier – monitors
- Jean-François Dubois – band gear
