= Love Can Move Mountains =

Single by Celine Dion

from the album Celine Dion
- B-side: "Cry Just a Little"
- Released: 27 October 1992
- Recorded: Cove City Sound
- Genre: Dance-pop; gospel; soul
- Length: 4:53
- Label: Columbia; Epic
- Songwriter: Diane Warren
- Producer: Ric Wake

Celine Dion singles chronology
"Nothing Broken but My Heart" (1992)	"Love Can Move Mountains" (1992)	"Water from the Moon" (1993)

Music video
- "Love Can Move Mountains" on YouTube

"Love Can Move Mountains" is a song by Canadian singer Celine Dion, recorded for her second English-language studio album, Celine Dion (1992). Written by Diane Warren and produced by Ric Wake, it was issued as the album's fourth single in October 1992 by Columbia and Epic Records. The song is an up-tempo dance-pop track with gospel influences, and its lyrics explore the power of love as an emotional force. The accompanying music video, directed by Jeb Brian, shows Dion performing at a county fair. "Love Can Move Mountains" later appeared on her compilation albums All the Way... A Decade of Song (1999) and My Love: Ultimate Essential Collection (2008).

== Background and release ==
The B-side, "Cry Just a Little", produced by Ric Wake and written by Lotti Golden and Tommy Faragher, is a cover of a track from E. G. Daily's 1989 album Lace Around the Wound. It is the second Daily composition recorded by Dion; in 1987 she released a French adaptation of "Love in the Shadows" titled "Délivre-moi".

"Love Can Move Mountains" was remixed for club release by Tommy Musto (Tommy Musto's 7" edit, club mix, club dub, underground vocal mix, underground instrumental, underground dub), Ric Wake and Richie Jones (Wake & Jones dub), and Daniel Abraham (Daniel Abraham's 7" edit).

== Critical reception ==
AllMusic editor Jose F. Promis gave the song three out of five stars, noting that there are two remixed radio edits of "Love Can Move Mountains", "one bouncy and the other sleek, and two housey club versions, similar to most dance music from the early '90s in that it seemed to possess a since-lost elegance and a since-lost innocence". Another AllMusic editor, Stephen Thomas Erlewine, named the track one of the album's standouts, along with "If You Asked Me To" and "Beauty and the Beast".

Larry Flick from Billboard described it as a "delicious, gospel-influenced pop/dance anthem with open arms" and an "uplifting, rousing gem". He added that Dion "takes advantage of the opportunity to cut loose with a big, belted vocal – though she wisely keeps her usual penchant for melodrama down to a minimum". Randy Clark from Cashbox wrote that the "upbeat, gospel-flavored" single "proves once again this Canadian import is a force to be reckoned with in the '90s". He also remarked that Dion "is now expanding her commerciality with this soulful, yet danceable track on which she is backed with a rich choir".

Chicago Tribune editor Jan DeKnock called it "an effective journey into gospel". Dave Sholin from the Gavin Report wrote that producer Ric Wake is best known for his work with Taylor Dayne, "but this time he adds just the right edge to Celine Dion's powerful vocal approach. It's evident that she was pouring every ounce of emotion possible into this Diane Warren song, giving it a gospel-like quality. Since she's best known for her stirring ballads, 'Love Can Move Mountains' will acquaint the public with yet another side to this wonderfully gifted and very versatile songstress".

A reviewer from Music & Media described the track as a "gospel-framed song set to modern beats". Parry Gettelman from the Orlando Sentinel felt that Dion "really excels" on a dance track "in the Lisa Stansfield mold".

== Commercial performance ==
"Love Can Move Mountains" became a club hit in the US, reaching number five on the Billboard Hot Dance Club Play chart. The single peaked at number two in Canada and reached number 36 on the Billboard Hot 100 in the US. It achieved moderate success in other international markets.

== Music video ==
The music video for "Love Can Move Mountains", which shows Dion performing at a county fair, was created for Daniel Abraham's 7" edit. Directed by Jeb Brian, it was released in November 1992. The video was later included on Dion's DVD collection All the Way... A Decade of Song & Video (2001).

== Live performances ==
"Love Can Move Mountains" has been included in every one of Dion's tours since 1992. She also performed it five nights a week during her residency show A New Day... at Caesars Palace, Las Vegas, and during her BST Hyde Park concert in London on 5 July 2019. Dion performed the song during the halftime show at the 1992 Grey Cup in Toronto.

Live versions of "Love Can Move Mountains" appear on the 1994 À l'Olympia CD, the Au coeur du stade DVD, the Taking Chances World Tour: The Concert DVD/CD, and the Céline une seule fois / Live 2013 DVD/CD. In 1998, Dion re-recorded "Love Can Move Mountains" with the gospel group God's Property for the soundtrack of the CBS drama Touched by an Angel. She also appeared as herself in the episode titled Psalm 151, where she performed the song.

== Accolades ==
The club mix of "Love Can Move Mountains" won the Juno Award for Dance Recording of the Year, while the original version received a nomination for the Juno Award for Single of the Year.

== Formats and track listing ==
- 7-inch, cassette, 3-inch CD, and CD single
1. "Love Can Move Mountains" (remix) – 4:04
2. "Cry Just a Little" – 4:29
- Australian cassette and CD single
1. "Love Can Move Mountains" (remix) – 4:04
2. "Cry Just a Little" – 4:29
3. "Love Can Move Mountains" (club mix) – 5:30
4. "Love Can Move Mountains" (Wake & Jones dub) – 5:41
5. "Love Can Move Mountains" (underground dub) – 5:35
- Canadian and US 12-inch single
1. "Love Can Move Mountains" (club mix) – 5:30
2. "Love Can Move Mountains" (underground vocal mix) – 7:10
3. "Love Can Move Mountains" (Wake & Jones dub) – 5:41
4. "Love Can Move Mountains" (club dub) – 5:30
5. "Love Can Move Mountains" (underground dub) – 5:35
6. "Unison" (mainstream mix) – 7:15
- European CD single
1. "Love Can Move Mountains" (remix) – 4:04
2. "Love Can Move Mountains" (club mix) – 5:30
3. "Cry Just a Little" – 4:29
- European and UK 12-inch single
1. "Love Can Move Mountains" (club mix) – 5:30
2. "Love Can Move Mountains" (underground vocal mix) – 7:10
3. "Love Can Move Mountains" (underground instrumental) – 4:38
4. "Love Can Move Mountains" (club dub) – 5:30
5. "Love Can Move Mountains" (underground dub) – 5:35
6. "Love Can Move Mountains" (Wake & Jones dub) – 5:41
- UK 7-inch and cassette single
1. "Love Can Move Mountains" (remix) – 4:04
2. "Beauty and the Beast" – 3:57
- UK CD single
1. "Love Can Move Mountains" (remix) – 4:04
2. "Love Can Move Mountains" (club mix) – 5:30
3. "Cry Just a Little" – 4:29
4. "Beauty and the Beast" – 3:57
- US CD single
1. "Love Can Move Mountains" (Daniel Abraham 7" edit) – 4:05
2. "Love Can Move Mountains" (Tommy Musto 7" edit) – 4:10
3. "Love Can Move Mountains" (club mix) – 5:30
4. "Love Can Move Mountains" (underground vocal mix) – 7:10
5. "(If There Was) Any Other Way" (remix) – 5:39
6. "Unison" (mainstream mix) – 7:15

== Charts ==
=== Weekly charts ===
Weekly chart performance
Chart (1992–1993)	Peak position
Australia (ARIA)	54
Canada Retail Singles (The Record)	8
Canada Contemporary Hit Radio (The Record)	3
Canada Top Singles (RPM)	2
Canada Adult Contemporary (RPM)	1
Canada Dance/Urban (RPM)	5
Europe (European Hit Radio)	31
Germany (GfK)	61
Quebec Radio Songs (ADISQ)	3
Sweden (Airplay)	8
UK Singles (Official Charts)	46
UK Dance (Music Week)	25
UK Club Chart (Music Week)	22
US Billboard Hot 100	36
US Adult Contemporary (Billboard)	8
US Dance Club Songs (Billboard)	5
US Dance Singles Sales (Billboard)	3
US Pop Airplay (Billboard)	22
US Cash Box Top 100	33

=== Year-end charts ===
1992 year-end chart performance
Chart (1992)	Position
Canada Top Singles (RPM)	97

1993 year-end chart performance
Chart (1993)	Position
Canada Top Singles (RPM)	20
Canada Adult Contemporary (RPM)	13
Canada Dance/Urban (RPM)	40
US Adult Contemporary (Billboard)	40
US Maxi-Singles Sales (Billboard)	47

== Release history ==
Region	Date	Format(s)	Label(s)	Ref.
United States	27 October 1992	CD; cassette; 12-inch vinyl; 7-inch vinyl	Epic	
Japan	1 November 1992	Mini CD	SMEJ	
United Kingdom	2 November 1992	CD; cassette; 12-inch vinyl; 7-inch vinyl	Epic	
