= Water from the Moon =

1993 single by Celine Dion

Single by Celine Dion

from the album Celine Dion
- B-side: "Little Bit of Love"
- Released: February 1993
- Studio: The Plant; Criterion; Bunny Hop; Sherman Oaks; Oceanway
- Genre: Pop
- Length: 4:38
- Label: Columbia; Epic
- Songwriter: Diane Warren
- Producers: Guy Roche; Walter Afanasieff

Celine Dion singles chronology
"Love Can Move Mountains" (1992)	"Water from the Moon" (1993)	"Un garçon pas comme les autres (Ziggy)" (1993)

Music video
- "Water from the Moon" on YouTube

"Water from the Moon" is a song by Canadian singer Celine Dion, recorded for her second English-language studio album, Celine Dion (1992). It was commercially released in February 1993 as the fifth single in the United States, while in Canada it was issued to radio only. The song was written by Diane Warren and produced by Guy Roche, with additional production by Walter Afanasieff. Warren also provided background vocals.

== Critical reception ==
American magazine Billboard described the song as a "lush" and "dramatic" ballad. Editor Larry Flick wrote that after a brief dance departure, "Dion returns to her comfy ballad turf with an appropriately dramatic bit of diva dynamite. Guy Roche's grand production values are the perfect setting for Dion's large, stirring voice". Randy Clark from Cashbox called it a "big, broken-hearted ballad", adding that "her voice is a natural for hit writer Diane Warren's music, and when backed with the production of Guy Roche and Walter Afanasieff, you got a winner no matter how you look at it, or how big it sells".

Dave Sholin from the Gavin Report commented, "In the short timespan between her debut album and this follow-up, that awesome vocal presence has only gotten stronger. Pairing this remarkable singer with the songwriting skill of Diane Warren spells slam dunk-and the result is just that". Another editor, Ron Fell, described it as a "forlorn ballad of exquisite sentimentality". Parry Gettelman from the Orlando Sentinel wrote that it is "a real Star Search contestant's dream, but Dion manages to keep it from getting too out of hand". In a 2019 retrospective review, Christopher Smith from Talk About Pop Music described it as "high drama" and a "rock-ballad", adding that "it's another excuse to show off her most prized possession, those amazing lungs!"

== Commercial performance ==
"Water from the Moon" peaked at number seven in Canada. In the US, it did not enter the Billboard Hot 100, but achieved moderate success on the adult contemporary chart, reaching number 11 on Hot Adult Contemporary Tracks.

== Music video ==
Two music videos were produced for the song. The first was filmed entirely in black and white. A revised version was later released, adding further shots of Dion in a brownish-yellow tint. The video opens with scenes of daily life in a small town: children walking to or from school, older men playing dominoes at a cafe, and women in black veils lighting candles in a church. A young man working at the pier watches Dion driving through town, wearing a black headscarf. She is also shown in a telephone booth and walking on a beach. Close-ups of Dion singing appear throughout. Later in the video, the young man is at home. He sees Dion stepping out of her car outside his window. He opens the fridge, and Dion suddenly appears, pushing him away. Near the end, Dion sings with tears in her eyes. The man watches her drive off.

== Formats and track listing ==
- US 7-inch and cassette single
1. "Water from the Moon" (radio edit) – 4:11
2. "Little Bit of Love" – 4:27

== Personnel ==
- Celine Dion – vocals
- Guy Roche – production, arrangement, recording, keyboards
- Walter Afanasieff – additional vocal arrangement and production
- Diane Warren – backing vocals
- Bruce Gaitsch – guitars
- Jeffrey C.J. Vanston – keyboards
- Robbie Buchanan – piano
- Jimmy Johnson – bass
- Dana Jon Chapelle – recording, mixing (also engineered mix)
- Ken Allardyce – recording
- Paul Erickson – recording
- Mario Euocy – assistant engineering
- Neill King – assistant engineering
- Brian Pollock – assistant engineering

== Charts ==
=== Weekly charts ===
Weekly chart performance
Chart (1993)	Peak position
Canada Top Singles (RPM)	7
Canada Adult Contemporary (RPM)	3
Canada Contemporary Hit Radio (The Record)	13
Quebec Radio Songs (ADISQ)	1
US Adult Contemporary (Billboard)	11

=== Year-end charts ===
Year-end chart performance
Chart (1993)	Position
Canada Top Singles (RPM)	66
Canada Adult Contemporary (RPM)	17
US Adult Contemporary (Billboard)	46

== Release history ==
Release history
Region	Date	Format(s)	Label(s)	Ref.
Canada	February 1993	Promotional CD	Columbia	
United States	February 1993	7-inch vinyl; cassette	Epic	
