= If You Asked Me To =

1989 single by Patti LaBelle

- US retail cassette single

Single by Patti LaBelle

from the album Be Yourself and Licence to Kill
- Released: June 12, 1989
- Recorded: 1989
- Genre: Pop; R&B
- Length: 3:58
- Label: MCA
- Songwriter: Diane Warren
- Producers: Stewart Levine; Aaron Zigman

Patti LaBelle singles chronology
"Kiss Away the Pain" (1986)	"If You Asked Me To" (1989)	"Yo Mister" (1989)

Music video
- "If You Asked Me To" on YouTube

"If You Asked Me To" is a song written by American songwriter Diane Warren and produced by Stewart Levine and Aaron Zigman. It was first recorded by American singer Patti LaBelle for her ninth studio album, Be Yourself (1989), and also appeared on the Licence to Kill soundtrack. The song was issued as the soundtrack's second single on June 12, 1989, by MCA Records. The lyrics present the perspective of a woman addressing her partner: "If you asked me to, I just might change my mind, and let you in my life forever". In 1992, Canadian singer Celine Dion recorded her own version for her self-titled second English-language studio album. Released as the album's second single, Dion's recording reached number one in Canada and peaked at number four on the US Billboard Hot 100.

== Background ==
"If You Asked Me To" was first included on the soundtrack of the 1989 James Bond film Licence to Kill. The title references dialogue from the movie. Patti LaBelle's version reached number 79 on the US Billboard Hot 100, number 10 on the Hot R&B/Hip-Hop Songs, and number 11 on the Hot Adult Contemporary Tracks. The song was also used in the daytime soap opera General Hospital in 1989.

== Critical reception ==
Pan-European magazine Music & Media described the track as "a smooth, mid-tempo ballad with a synthesizer-dominated AC production by Stewart Levine".

== Commercial performance ==
Although the song became a top 10 hit on the US Billboard Hot R&B/Hip-Hop Songs chart, it did not reach similar success on the pop charts until Celine Dion recorded her version three years later. In the liner notes of her 1999 Greatest Hits album, LaBelle reflected on the song's performance: "I knew the song was a hit when I recorded it, and I was happy that Celine did it and did so well with it. But the arrangements are so close and we both have pretty powerful voices... so who knows why my version didn't take off. Maybe it was timing..".

== Music video ==
The music video for "If You Asked Me To" was filmed the day after the funeral of LaBelle's sister Jacqueline "Jackie" Padgett, who died of lung cancer at age 43. She was the third of LaBelle's sisters to die before age 44, after Vivian Hogan and Barbara Holte. The video's tone reflects LaBelle's grief, showing her dressed in black and singing in a church surrounded by candles and lilies, intercut with scenes of her in tears.

== Personnel ==
- Patti LaBelle – lead vocals
- Aaron Zigman – production, synthesizer programming, synth bass
- Stewart Levine – production
- Darren Klein – recording, mixing
- Michael Landau – guitars
- John Robinson – drums
- Lenny Castro – percussion
- Bunny Hull – backing vocals
- Paulette Brown – backing vocals
- Valerie Pinkston-Mayo – backing vocals

== Charts ==
Chart performance
Chart (1989)	Peak position
Australia (ARIA)	163
US Billboard Hot 100	79
US Adult Contemporary (Billboard)	11
US Hot R&B/Hip-Hop Songs (Billboard)	10

== Celine Dion version ==
"If You Asked Me To"
- US CD single

Single by Celine Dion

from the album Celine Dion
- B-side: "Love You Blind"
- Released: April 13, 1992
- Studio: Criterion; The Village; Music Grinder; Ocean Way
- Genre: Pop
- Length: 3:55
- Label: Columbia; Epic
- Songwriter: Diane Warren
- Producer: Guy Roche

Celine Dion singles chronology
"Je danse dans ma tête" (1992)	"If You Asked Me To" (1992)	"Nothing Broken but My Heart" (1992)

Music video
- "If You Asked Me To" on YouTube

Celine Dion's recording of "If You Asked Me To" was issued by Columbia and Epic Records as the second single from her 1992 self-titled studio album. Produced by Guy Roche, it was released in Canada and the United States in April 1992, followed later that year by international distribution. The single includes a non-album B-side, "Love You Blind", written by Sheryl Crow and Jay Oliver and produced by Walter Afanasieff. "If You Asked Me To" was later added to the North American editions of Dion's greatest hits albums All the Way... A Decade of Song (1999) and My Love: Essential Collection (2008).

=== Critical reception ===
AllMusic senior editor Stephen Thomas Erlewine described "If You Asked Me To" as one of the album's standout tracks, along with "Beauty and the Beast" (with Peabo Bryson) and "Love Can Move Mountains". A Billboard magazine editor called it a "lush" and "dramatic" ballad. Another Billboard editor, Larry Flick, wrote that Dion reinterprets Patti LaBelle's hit "with highly positive results", adding that "she proves she is on the road to developing a fine and distinctive vocal style". Randy Clark and Bryan DeVaney from Cashbox wrote, "Now that the world knows who this Canadian songstress is", and described the song as "powerful and emotional". Dayton Daily News called it "hauntingly beautiful". Dave Sholin from the Gavin Report wrote that Dion "deserves all the accolades she's gotten the past few years, and surely her rendition of this touching Diane Warren ballad [...] takes her to a new level". Other Gavin Report editors, Diane Rufer and Ron Fell, wrote that Dion "makes it fresh and uniquely her own". Geoff Edgers from Salon Magazine argued that "If You Asked Me To", "with Dion's moaning, pleading, screaming take-me vocals, works when reassessed as a chunk of modern soul as worthy as anything recorded by Whitney Houston or Mariah Carey". Jonathan Bernstein from Spin called the song "sensational", adding that it "proves that astringency, urgency, and dressing down may win out over homogeneity, artifice, and insincerity, but a good Diane Warren hook lives forever".

=== Commercial performance ===
The single was successful in the United States and Canada. "If You Asked Me To" reached numbers four and five on the US Billboard Hot 100 and Cash Box Top 100, and performed even better on the Billboard Adult Contemporary chart, spending three weeks at number one. In Canada, it also reached number one. The single achieved moderate results in other territories. In the United Kingdom, it was issued twice: first in June 1992, when it peaked at number 60 on the UK Singles Chart, and again in December 1992, when it reached number 57.

=== Music video ===
The music video for "If You Asked Me To" was directed by Dominic Orlando and filmed in Chatsworth and Hollywood, Los Angeles. Released in April 1992, it was later included on Dion's 2001 DVD collection All the Way... A Decade of Song & Video.

In the video, Dion performs the song inside a manor. It opens with her sitting alone in a room by a large window. One scene shows a hand touching her cheek. Other scenes depict her in a white dress surrounded by mirrors. Outdoor shots show her walking around the property. The video ends with a man holding her as she sits in the room.

=== Accolades ===
In 1993, "If You Asked Me To" received an ASCAP Pop Award for most performed song in the United States. It was also nominated for the Billboard Music Award for Hot Adult Contemporary Single of the Year and the Juno Award for Single of the Year (the latter won by Dion and Bryson's "Beauty and the Beast" at the Juno Awards of 1993). About.com placed the song at number one in its 2017 ranking of "Top 10 Celine Dion Songs", describing it as a "big midtempo ballad".

=== Personnel ===
- Celine Dion – vocals
- Guy Roche – production, synthesizer
- Michael Thompson – guitar
- John Robinson – drums
- Jean McClain – background vocals
- Larry Jacobs – background vocals
- Terry Wood – background vocals

=== Formats and track listing ===
- 7-inch, cassette, 3-inch CD, and CD single
1. "If You Asked Me To" – 3:55
2. "Love You Blind" – 4:35
- US 7-inch and CD single
1. "If You Asked Me To" – 3:55
2. "Where Does My Heart Beat Now" – 4:33
- European CD single
1. "If You Asked Me To" – 3:55
2. "Love You Blind" – 4:35
3. "Halfway to Heaven" – 5:05
- UK CD single
1. "If You Asked Me To" – 3:55
2. "Where Does My Heart Beat Now" – 4:33
3. "Love You Blind" – 4:35

=== Charts ===
==== Weekly charts ====
Weekly chart performance
Chart (1992)	Peak position
Australia (ARIA)	52
Canada Top Singles (RPM)	1
Canada Adult Contemporary (RPM)	1
Canada Retail Singles (The Record)	3
Canada Contemporary Hit Radio (The Record)	1
Netherlands (Dutch Top 40)	27
Netherlands (Single Top 100)	28
New Zealand (Recorded Music NZ)	26
Quebec Radio Songs (ADISQ)	1
UK Singles (Official Charts)	57
UK Airplay (Music Week)	47
US Billboard Hot 100	4
US Adult Contemporary (Billboard)	1
US Cash Box Top 100	5

==== Year-end charts ====
Year-end chart performance
Chart (1992)	Position
Brazil (Crowley)	15
Canada Top Singles (RPM)	4
Canada Adult Contemporary (RPM)	3
US Billboard Hot 100	28
US Adult Contemporary (Billboard)	3
US Cash Box Top 100	18

==== All-time charts ====
All-time chart performance
Chart (1975–2000)	Position
Canada (Nielsen SoundScan)	35

=== Release history ===
Region	Date	Format(s)	Label(s)	Ref.
Canada	April 13, 1992	Cassette	Columbia	
United States	April 13, 1992	7-inch vinyl; CD; cassette	Epic	
Japan	May 21, 1992	Mini CD	SMEJ	
Australia	June 1, 1992	CD; cassette	Epic	
United Kingdom	June 22, 1992	7-inch vinyl; CD; cassette	Epic	

== See also ==
- Billboard Year-End Hot 100 singles of 1992
- List of Billboard Hot 100 top-ten singles in 1992
- List of Hot Adult Contemporary number ones of 1992
- List of number-one singles of 1992 (Canada)
