= Yo Mister =

Single by Patti LaBelle

from the album Be Yourself
- Released: July 1989
- Recorded: 11 November 1986; 21 May 1988
- Studio: Sunset Sound, Hollywood, California; Paisley Park, Chanhassen, Minnesota
- Genre: New jack swing
- Length: 5:12
- Label: MCA
- Songwriter(s): Prince
- Producer(s): Prince

Patti LaBelle singles chronology
"If You Asked Me To" (1989)	"Yo Mister" (1989)	"I Can't Complain" (1990)

Music video
- "Yo Mister" on YouTube

"Yo Mister" is a song by American singer Patti LaBelle. It was written and produced by Prince for her 1989 album, Be Yourself. Prince features on various instruments and background vocals on the song which was released as a single in July 1989. It became a top ten hit on the US Hot R&B/Hip-Hop Songs when it peaked at number six, becoming one of LaBelle's biggest R&B hits. "Yo Mister"'s single mix and corresponding video version was mixed by Chris Lord-Alge.

== Credits and personnel ==
Credits adapted from Duane Tudahl, Prince Vault, and the liner notes of Be Yourself.

- Patti LaBelle – lead and backing vocals
- Prince – backing vocals, Fairlight CMI and Prophet VS synthesizers, piano, electric guitar, bass guitar, Linn LM-1
- Margie Cox – backing vocals (uncredited)

=== Production credits ===
- Arranged, produced and played by Prince
- Recorded, mixed and remixed by Timmy Regisford

== Charts ==
Chart performance for "Yo Mister"
Chart (1989)	Peak position
US Hot R&B/Hip-Hop Songs (Billboard)	6
