= This Christmas (Patti LaBelle album) =

Studio album by Patti LaBelle
- Released: October 30, 1990
- Length: 49:54
- Label: MCA
- Producers: James "Budd" Ellison; Kenneth Gamble; Leon Huff; Sami McKinney; Michael O'Hara; Bunny Sigler; Randy Waldman; Nathanial "Crocket" Wilke

Patti LaBelle chronology
Be Yourself (1989)	This Christmas (1990)	Burnin' (1991)

This Christmas is the first Christmas album released by American singer Patti LaBelle. It was released by MCA Records on October 30, 1990, in the United States. The album was released while LaBelle was working on a follow-up to her previous album, Be Yourself (1989). It included original compositions such as "'Twas Love", which LaBelle shot a video for, and "Nothing Could Be Better", which was sung live by LaBelle during an appearance on the television show, A Different World. This Christmas would be re-released in 1995 with all new artwork and a new bonus track, "Angel Man". The 1995 re-release was later reissued in 2004 under the 20th Century Masters: The Christmas Collection line, labeled The Best of Patti LaBelle.

== Critical reception ==
Professional ratings
Review scores
Source	Rating
Allmusic	3/5 stars

Allmusic editor Jose F. Promis called This Christmas a "likeable collection of easygoing holiday confections. The songs prove quite endearing, but in some cases are marred by somewhat dated production [...] Oftentimes, holiday albums such as this – composed of new, untraditional recordings – are somewhat tepid, but that's thankfully not the case here. Despite a few dull moments and some lackluster production, this is quite an enjoyable and endearing holiday set, and will no doubt please the legendary singer's many fans."

== Track listing ==
No.	Title	Writer(s)	Producer(s)	Length
1.	"This Christmas"		James "Budd" Ellison; Lem Newmuis^{[A]}	4:20
2.	"'Twas Love"	Janey Clewer	Randy Waldman	3:43
3.	"Nothing Could Be Better"	Robert Bounds, Sami McKinney, Michael O'Hara	Michael O'Hara; Sami McKinney	3:24
4.	"I'm Christmasing With You"	Janey Clewer, Randy Waldman	Waldman	3:38
5.	"What Are You Doing New Year's Eve?"		Bunny Sigler	4:28
6.	"If Everyday Could Be Like Christmas"	Walter "Bunny" Sigler, James Sigler, Eugene "Lambchops" Curry	Sigler; Eugene "Lambchops" Curry^{[B]}	4:54
7.	"Reason for the Season"	McKinney, O'Hara	O'Hara; McKinney	5:03
8.	"Country Christmas"	Patti LaBelle, James "Budd" Ellison, William Holte, Walter "Bunny" Sigler, Nathaniel Wilke	Ellison; Nathaniel "Crocket" Wilke	4:16
9.	"Born In a Manger"	Curry, J. Sigler, W. Sigler, Armstead Edwards	Sigler; Curry^{[B]}	3:29
10.	"O Holy Night"		Sigler; Curry^{[B]}	4:40
11.	"Wouldn't It Be Beautiful"	Gamble, Huff	Kenneth Gamble; Leon Huff	3:56

Re-issue bonus track
No.	Title	Writer(s)	Producer(s)	Length
12.	"Angel Man"	Gary Shiebler	Rex Neilson	4:03

Notes

- ^{^[A]} denotes associate producer
- ^{^[B]} denotes co-producer

== Personnel ==
- Patti LaBelle – vocals
- Nathaniel Wilke – keyboards (1), synthesizer programming (1, 8), drum programming (1, 8)
- Kevin Foley – keyboard programming (1), synthesizer programming (8)
- Randy Waldman – synthesizers (2, 4), drum programming (2), acoustic piano (4), arrangements (4), vocal arrangements (4)
- Michael O'Hara – keyboards (3, 7), drum programming (3, 7)
- Eugene Curry – keyboards (5, 6, 9, 10), arrangements (5, 6, 9, 10)
- Leon Huff – keyboards (11), synthesizers (11)
- Dennis Harris – guitars (11)
- T.J. – guitars (11)
- Kim Darigan – bass guitar (4)
- Jimmy Williams – bass guitar (11)
- John Guerin – drums (4)
- Daryl Burgee – percussion (4)
- Quinton Joseph – percussion programming (5, 6, 10), drums (11)
- Vincent Montana Jr. – vibraphone (11)
- David Boruff – saxophone solo (2, 4)
- Leon Zachery – saxophone (11)
- James "Budd" Ellison – arrangements (1, 8)
- Connie Draper – backing vocals (1, 8)
- Debbie Henry – backing vocals (1, 8)
- Tommi Johnson – backing vocals (1, 8)
- Janey Clewer – backing vocals (2), vocal arrangements (4)
- Jackie Gouche – backing vocals (3, 7)
- Bunny Sigler – backing vocals (5, 6, 8, 10), arrangements (5, 6, 9, 10)
- Sassy – backing vocals (9, 10)
- Clinton Donaldson – monologue (9)
- Cynthia Biggs – backing vocals (11)
- Charlene Holloway – backing vocals (11)
- Paula Holloway – backing vocals (11)

== Production ==
- L. Armstead Edwards – executive producer
- Clinton Donaldson – production coordinator
- Jolie Levine – production coordinator (2, 4)
- Vartan Kurjian – art direction
- Andy Engel – design, spot illustration
- Chris Consani – front cover illustration
- PAZ Management Company – management

Technical credits

- Eddy Schreyer – mastering at Future Disc Systems (Hollywood, California)
- Michael Tarsia – recording (1, 8), mixing (1, 8)
- Randy Waldman – recording (2, 4)
- Joe Alexander – vocal recording (2, 4, 7), vocal recording engineer (3), mixing (5, 6, 9, 10)
- Kevin Clark – mixing (2, 4)
- Sami McKinney – recording (3), vocal recording (3)
- Michael O'Hara – recording (3)
- Olivier Ferrand – recording engineer (3), mixing (3, 7), recording (7)
- Brook Hendrix – recording (5, 10)
- Ron Shaffer – overdubs (5)
- Jim Gallagher – recording (6, 9, 11)
- Scott McMinn – recording (6, 9), mixing (11)
- Michael Cohn – assistant engineer (1, 8)

== Charts ==
Chart (1990–91)	Peak position
US Top Holiday Albums (Billboard)	18
