= List of Hot Adult Contemporary number ones of 1992 =

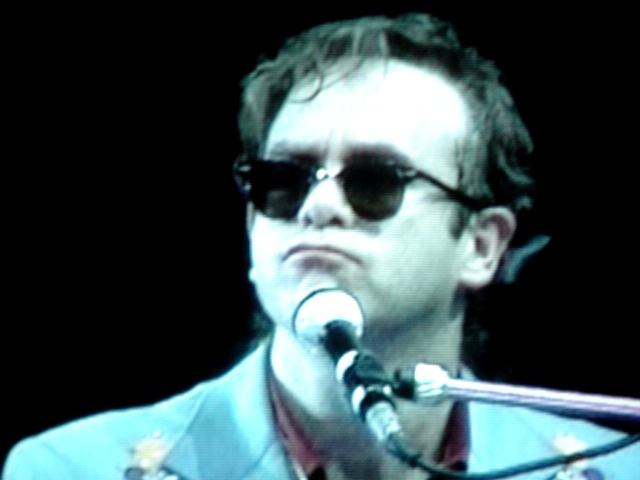
Elton John's "The One" was the year's longest-running number one.

In 1992, Billboard magazine published a chart ranking the top-performing songs in the United States in the adult contemporary music (AC) market. The chart, which in 1992 was published under the title Hot Adult Contemporary, has undergone various name changes during its history but has been published as Adult Contemporary since 1996. In 1992, 19 songs topped the chart based on playlists submitted by radio stations.

At the start of the year, Richard Marx was at number one with "Keep Coming Back", retaining a position that the song had occupied at the end of 1991. The track topped the chart for the first two weeks of 1992 before being displaced by Mariah Carey's "Can't Let Go". Marx and Carey both had two chart-toppers in 1992, a feat also achieved by Michael Bolton and Celine Dion. Elton John topped the chart with his solo single "The One" and also made a guest appearance on George Michael's version of "Don't Let the Sun Go Down on Me", which John himself had originally recorded in 1974. John's "The One" had the year's longest unbroken run at number one, spending six weeks in the top spot, and the British singer tied with Bolton for the highest total number of weeks atop the chart by an artist, each spending eight weeks at number one. Two of 1992's number ones originated as performances on the MTV Unplugged television series: Carey's rendition of "I'll Be There", originally performed by the Jackson 5, and Eric Clapton's "Tears in Heaven".

The final number one of the year was "I Will Always Love You" by Whitney Houston, from the soundtrack of the film The Bodyguard, in which she starred. The song held the top spot for the final two weeks of 1992. It was among three of 1992's Hot Adult Contemporary number ones to also top Billboard's pop chart, the Hot 100, along with "Don't Let the Sun Go Down on Me" by Michael and John and "Save the Best for Last" by Vanessa Williams; the latter song was a triple chart-topper as it also reached the top spot on the Hot R&B Singles listing. Williams had achieved previous number ones on that chart, but "Save the Best for Last" was her first AC chart-topper. Michael W. Smith, a successful singer in the contemporary Christian music genre since the early 1980s, gained his first Hot Adult Contemporary number one with "I Will Be Here for You". Patty Smyth, the former lead singer of the rock group Scandal, was also a first-time AC chart-topper in 1992 with "Sometimes Love Just Ain't Enough", a duet with Don Henley.

== Chart history ==
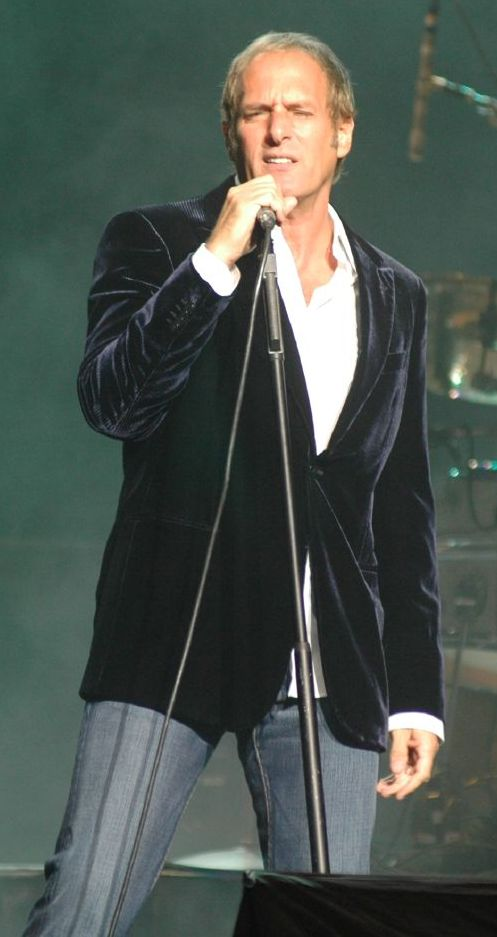
Michael Bolton had two number ones in 1992.

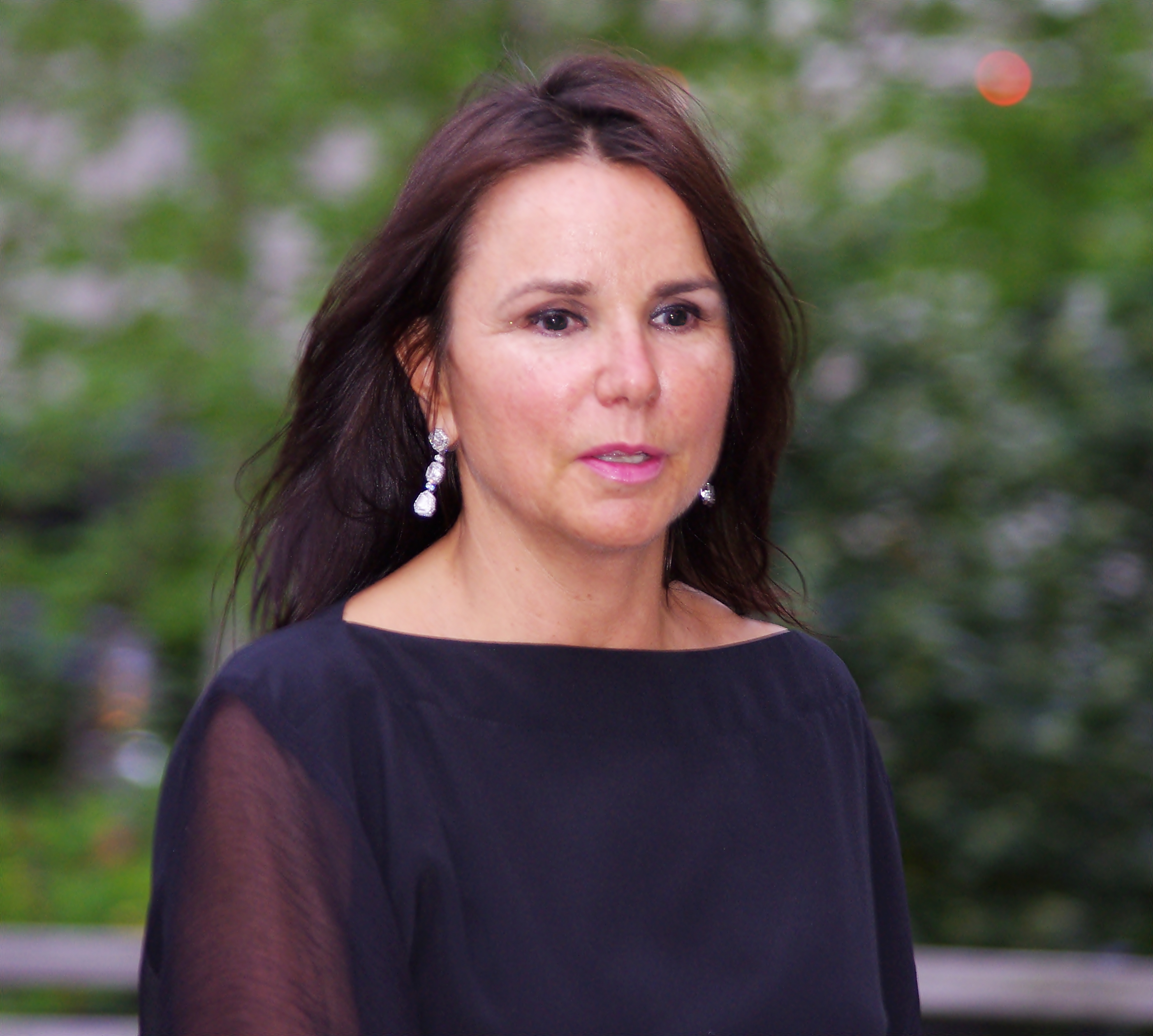
Patty Smyth topped the chart with "Sometimes Love Just Ain't Enough", a duet with Don Henley.

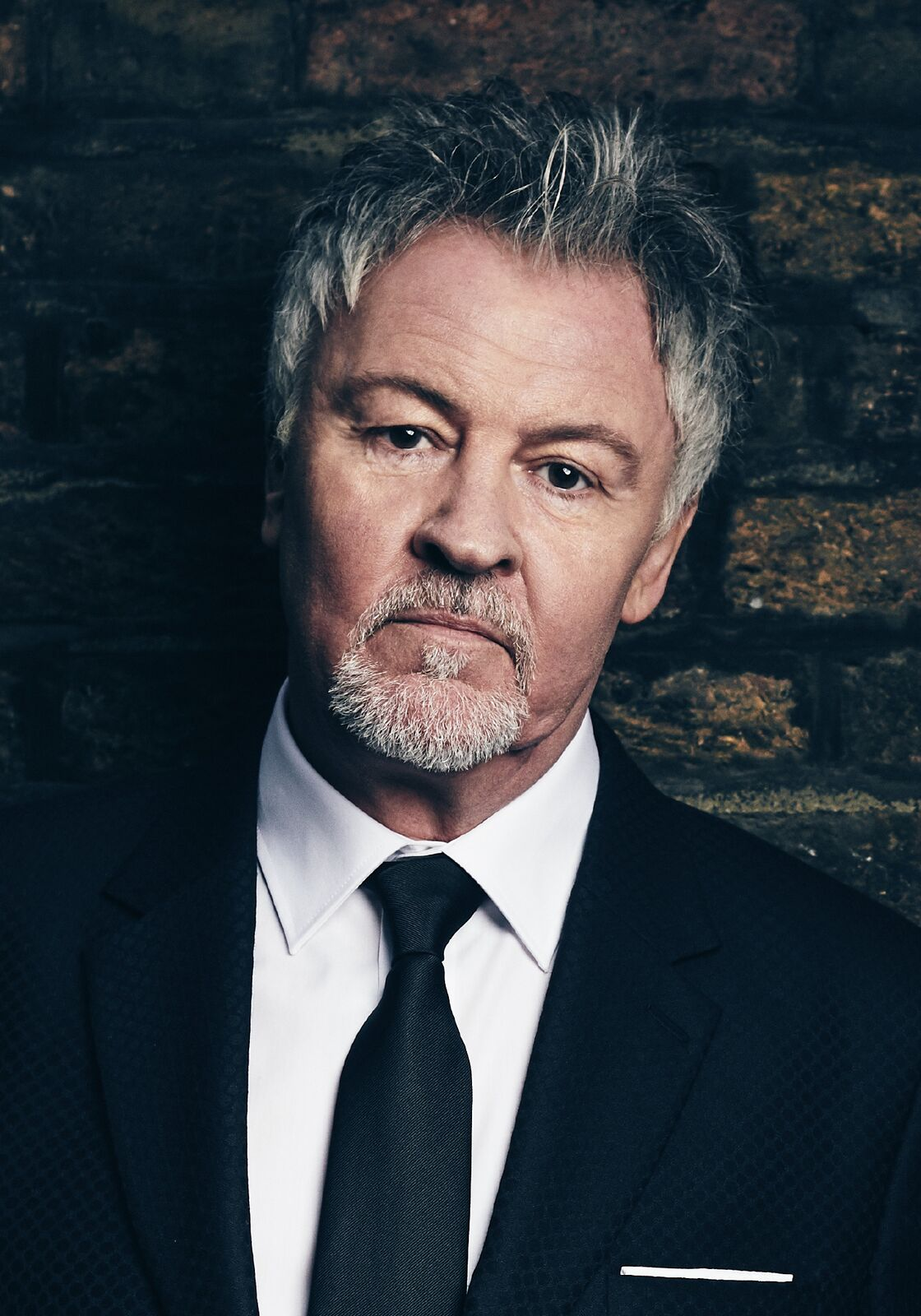
British singer Paul Young reached number one with his version of "What Becomes of the Brokenhearted".

Chart history
Issue date	Title	Artist(s)	Ref.
January 4	"Keep Coming Back"	Richard Marx	
January 11	"Keep Coming Back"	Richard Marx	
January 18	"Can't Let Go"	Mariah Carey	
January 25	"Can't Let Go"	Mariah Carey	
February 1	"Can't Let Go"	Mariah Carey	
February 8	"Don't Let the Sun Go Down on Me"	George Michael featuring Elton John	
February 15	"Don't Let the Sun Go Down on Me"	George Michael featuring Elton John	
February 22	"What Becomes of the Brokenhearted"	Paul Young	
February 29	"What Becomes of the Brokenhearted"	Paul Young	
March 7	"Missing You Now"	Michael Bolton featuring Kenny G	
March 14	"Missing You Now"	Michael Bolton featuring Kenny G	
March 21	"Missing You Now"	Michael Bolton featuring Kenny G	
March 28	"Save the Best for Last"	Vanessa Williams	
April 4	"Save the Best for Last"	Vanessa Williams	
April 11	"Save the Best for Last"	Vanessa Williams	
April 18	"Tears in Heaven"	Eric Clapton	
April 25	"Tears in Heaven"	Eric Clapton	
May 2	"Tears in Heaven"	Eric Clapton	
May 9	"Hazard"	Richard Marx	
May 16	"Hold on My Heart"	Genesis	
May 23	"Hold on My Heart"	Genesis	
May 30	"Hold on My Heart"	Genesis	
June 6	"Hold on My Heart"	Genesis	
June 13	"Hold on My Heart"	Genesis	
June 20	"If You Asked Me To"	Celine Dion	
June 27	"If You Asked Me To"	Celine Dion	
July 4	"If You Asked Me To"	Celine Dion	
July 11	"I'll Be There"	Mariah Carey	
July 18	"I'll Be There"	Mariah Carey	
July 25	"The One"	Elton John	
August 1	"The One"	Elton John	
August 8	"The One"	Elton John	
August 15	"The One"	Elton John	
August 22	"The One"	Elton John	
August 29	"The One"	Elton John	
September 5	"Restless Heart"	Peter Cetera	
September 12	"Restless Heart"	Peter Cetera	
September 19	"Sometimes Love Just Ain't Enough"	Patty Smyth with Don Henley	
September 26	"Sometimes Love Just Ain't Enough"	Patty Smyth with Don Henley	
October 3	"Sometimes Love Just Ain't Enough"	Patty Smyth with Don Henley	
October 10	"Sometimes Love Just Ain't Enough"	Patty Smyth with Don Henley	
October 17	"Nothing Broken but My Heart"	Celine Dion	
October 24	"Am I the Same Girl"	Swing Out Sister	
October 31	"I Will Be Here for You"	Michael W. Smith	
November 7	"I Will Be Here for You"	Michael W. Smith	
November 14	"To Love Somebody"	Michael Bolton	
November 21	"To Love Somebody"	Michael Bolton	
November 28	"To Love Somebody"	Michael Bolton	
December 5	"To Love Somebody"	Michael Bolton	
December 12	"To Love Somebody"	Michael Bolton	
December 19	"I Will Always Love You"	Whitney Houston	
December 26	"I Will Always Love You"	Whitney Houston	

== See also ==
- 1992 in music
- List of artists who reached number one on the U.S. Adult Contemporary chart
