= Be Yourself (Patti LaBelle album) =

Studio album by Patti LaBelle
- Released: June 26, 1989
- Recorded: 1986–1989
- Studio: Various: Westlake Audio and Elumba Studios (Los Angeles, California); Conway Studios, Sunset Sound, Ocean Way Recording and Trax Recording Studio (Hollywood, California); Alchemy Recording Studios (Woodland Hills, California); Tarpan Studios (San Rafael, California); Chartmaker Studios (Malibu, California); Can-Am Recorders (Tarzana, California); Kajeem/Victory Studios, RPM Studios and Sigma Sound Studios (Philadelphia, Pennsylvania); Soundworks (New York City, New York); Paisley Park (Minneapolis, Minnesota)
- Genre: R&B; soul; pop; new jack swing
- Length: 53:38
- Label: MCA
- Producer: Burt Bacharach; James R. "Budd" Ellison; Full Force; Raymond Jones; Stewart Levine; Sami McKinney; Prince; Allan Dennis Rich; Carole Bayer Sager; Alan Roy Scott; Narada Michael Walden

Patti LaBelle chronology
Winner in You (1986)	Be Yourself (1989)	This Christmas (1990)

Singles from Be Yourself
- 1. "If You Asked Me To" Released: June 12, 1989; 2. "Yo Mister" Released: July 1989; 3. "I Can't Complain" Released: 1990

Be Yourself is the ninth solo album by American recording artist Patti LaBelle. It was released by MCA Records on June 26, 1989, in the United States. Her second album with the company following her 1986 platinum album Winner in You, it features the single, "If You Asked Me To" which was also featured on the soundtrack to the James Bond movie, Licence to Kill (1989), and the R&B top ten Prince-written hit "Yo Mister." The album marked LaBelle's foray into new jack swing music with the tracks "I Got It Like That", produced by Full Force, and "Love 89", another Prince contribution.

== Critical reception ==
Professional ratings
Review scores
Source	Rating
AllMusic	3/5 stars
Chicago Tribune	3.5/4 stars
Rolling Stone	2.5/5 stars
Spin	(favorable)

AllMusic editor Jose F. Promis found that Be Yourself "boasts a bevy of the day's brightest songwriters and producers [...] Despite LaBelle's masterful, tear-inducing performance, the real gems on this set are two tunes written and produced by Prince [...] Despite a couple of unmemorable moments, Be Yourself doesn't disappoint by any means and is definitely worth having if only for the forgotten gems "Yo Mister" and "Love 89," which rank as some of Prince's better songs as well. Chicago Tribune critic Maurice Weaver remarked that "her vocal acrobatics have sometimes overwhelmed her material, but on this recording LaBelle sings brilliantly while covering gospel, R&B and dance."

== Track listing ==
Be Yourself track listing
No.	Title	Writer(s)	Producer(s)	Length
1.	"If You Asked Me To"	Diane Warren	Stewart Levine	3:58
2.	"I Can't Complain"	Sami McKinney; Raymond Jones	McKinney; Jones	5:08
3.	"Be Yourself"	Bunny Hull; Thelma Houston; Jeff Hull	James R. "Budd" Ellison	5:40
4.	"Yo Mister"	Prince	Prince	5:08
5.	"I Got It Like That"	Full Force	Full Force	5:38
6.	"Love 89"	Prince; Sheena Easton	Prince	5:09
7.	"Still in Love"	Narada Michael Walden; Jeffrey E. Cohen	Walden	4:36
8.	"I'm Scared of You"	Alan Roy Scott; Allan Dennis Rich	Scott; Rich	4:46
9.	"Can't Bring Me Down"	Tena Clark; Gary Prim	Ellison	4:13
10.	"Need a Little Faith"	Burt Bacharach; Carole Bayer Sager	Bacharach; Sager	4:00
11.	"I Can Fly"	Theodore McLean; Ellison; Patti LaBelle	Ellison	5:23
Total length:				53:38

== Personnel ==
Credits lifted from the album's liner notes.

Performers and musicians

- Patti LaBelle – lead vocals, backing vocals (2, 3, 11)
- Aaron Zigman – synthesizer programming (1), synth bass (1), arrangements (1)
- Raymond Jones – keyboards (2), arrangements (2)
- James "Budd" Ellison – keyboards (3, 9, 11), percussion (3)
- Nathaniel Wilke – keyboards (3, 9), synth bass (3, 9), synth drums (3), synthesizer arrangements (3, 11)
- Prince – all instruments (4, 6)
- Full Force – all instruments (5), backing vocals (5), arrangements (5)
- Walter Afanasieff – keyboards (7)
- David Sancious – keyboards (7)
- Ren Klyce – Fairlight CMI (7)
- Fred McFarlane – programming (7)
- Brad Cole – keyboards (8)
- Jim Salamone – synthesizer programming (9, 11), drum programming (9, 11), LinnDrum overdubs (9)
- Michael Boddicker – synthesizers (10)
- Randy Kerber – acoustic piano (10), Yamaha DX7 (10)
- George Duke – acoustic piano (11)
- Michael Landau – guitars (1)
- Corrado Rustici – guitars (7)
- Mark Liggett – guitars (8)
- Herb Smith – guitars (9, 11)
- Dann Huff – guitars (10)
- Randy Jackson – Moog bass (7)
- Dominic Genova – bass (8)
- Neil Stubenhaus – bass (10)
- John Robinson – drums (1)
- Larry Robinson – drum programming (2)
- Narada Michael Walden – drums (7), programming (7)
- Tom Walsh – drums (8)
- Jeff Porcaro – drums (10)
- Lenny Castro – percussion (1, 10)
- Gigi Gonaway – cymbals (7)
- Eric Wood – percussion (9)
- Gerald Albright – saxophone (2)
- Kenny G – saxophone solo (7)
- Michael Patterson Jr. – soprano sax solo (9)
- Jack Faith – horns (11), strings (11)
- Sami McKinney – arrangements (2)
- Jerry Hey – string arrangements (7)
- Burt Bacharach – arrangements (10)
- Frank DeCaro – session coordinator and contractor (10)
- Paulette Brown – backing vocals (1)
- Bunny Hull – backing vocals (1)
- Valerie Pinkston-Mayo – backing vocals (1)
- Desiree Coleman – backing vocals (3)
- Annette Hardeman – backing vocals (3, 9, 11)
- Paula Holloway – backing vocals (3, 9, 11)
- Thelma Houston – backing vocals (3)
- Lisa Lisa – backing vocals (5)
- Cheryl "Pepsii" Riley – backing vocals (5)
- Kitty Beethoven – backing vocals (7)
- Jim Gilstrap – backing vocals (7)
- Melisa Kary – backing vocals (7)
- Claytoven Richardson – backing vocals (7)
- Mona Campbell – backing vocals (8)
- Ronee Martin – backing vocals (8)
- Lyndie White – backing vocals (8)
- Deborah Dukes – backing vocals (9, 11)
- Charlene Holloway – backing vocals (9)
- Phil Perry – backing vocals (10)
- Joe Pizzulo – backing vocals (10)
- Stephanie Spruill – backing vocals (10)
- Julia Waters – backing vocals (10)
- Maxine Waters – backing vocals (10)
- Oren Waters – backing vocals (10)
- Gabriel Hardeman – backing vocals (11)
- O.J. Smallewood – backing vocals (11)
- Freddie Washington – backing vocals (11)
- The Music Ministry Workshop Choir – backing vocals (11)

Technical

- Patti LaBelle – executive producer
- James "Budd" Ellison – production supervisor
- Cheryl Dickerson – A&R direction
- Darren Klein – recording (1), mixing (1)
- Larry DeCarmine – recording (2)
- Larry Ferguson – recording (2), mixing (2)
- Arthur Stoppe – recording (3, 9, 11), mixing (3, 9, 11)
- Joe Tarsia – recording (3, 9, 11), mixing (3, 9, 11)
- Michael Tarsia – recording (3, 9, 11), mixing (3, 9, 11)
- Bob Fintz – mixing (3)
- Louil Silas Jr. – remixing (3, 11)
- Erik Zobler – remix engineer (3)
- Susan Rogers – recording (4)
- Alan Gregorie – remix engineer (4)
- Timmy Regisford – remixing (4)
- Tony Maserati – recording (5), mixing (5)
- Full Force – mixing (5)
- Eddie Miller – recording (6)
- David Frazer – recording (7), mixing (7)
- Michael J. McDonald – recording (8)
- Gene Leone – vocal recording (8)
- Mick Guzauski – recording (10), mixing (10)
- Clark Germain – engineer (10)
- Jeffrey "Woody" Woodruff – engineer (10)
- Jeff Chestek – recording assistant (2)
- Donnell Sullivan – mix assistant (2)
- Ronnie DeStasio – assistant engineer (3, 9, 11)
- Alphonse Faggiolo – assistant engineer (3, 9, 11)
- Adam Silverman – assistant engineer (3, 9, 11)
- John Sullivan – assistant engineer (3, 9, 11)
- Sal Viarellie – assistant engineer (3, 9, 11)
- Coke Johnson – assistant engineer (4)
- David Dill – recording assistant (5)
- Scott Gootman – recording assistant (5)
- Dana Jon Chappelle – assistant engineer (7)
- Tom Armeni – assistant engineer (10)
- Steve Hall – mastering at Future Disc (Hollywood, California)
- Christopher Lofaro – production coordinator (1)
- Amy Dakos – design
- John Kosh – design
- Carol Friedman – photography
- Gallin Morey Associates – management

== Charts ==
=== Weekly charts ===
Weekly chart performance for Be Yourself
Chart (1989)	Peak position
US Billboard 200	86
US Top R&B/Hip-Hop Albums (Billboard)	14
US Top 75 R&B Albums (Cashbox)	14
US Top 200 Albums (Cashbox)	97

=== Year-end charts ===
1989 year-end chart performance for Be Yourself
Chart (1989)	Position
US Top R&B/Hip-Hop Albums (Billboard)	62

1990 year-end chart performance for Be Yourself
Chart (1990)	Position
US Top R&B/Hip-Hop Albums (Billboard)	63
