= Can't Live with You, Can't Live Without You =

Single by Billy Newton-Davis and Celine Dion

from the album Spellbound
- B-side: "Stop Me (Before I Dream Again)"
- Released: July 1989
- Genre: Pop
- Length: 4:16
- Label: Columbia
- Songwriters: Dan Hill; John Parker; Steve Kipner
- Producer: Andy Goldmark

Billy Newton-Davis singles chronology
"I Can't Take It" (1989)	"Can't Live with You, Can't Live Without You" (1989)	"All I Really Need" (1989)

Celine Dion singles chronology
"D'abord, c'est quoi l'amour" (1988)	"Can't Live with You, Can't Live Without You" (1989)	"(If There Was) Any Other Way" (1990)

"Can't Live with You, Can't Live Without You" is a duet recorded by Billy Newton-Davis and Celine Dion. Released in Canada in July 1989 as the second single from Newton-Davis's album Spellbound, it followed the album's April 1989 debut. Written by Dan Hill, John Parker, and Steve Kipner, and produced by Andy Goldmark, the song later appeared on Dion's 1991 Japanese single "Unison". Goldmark also produced "Unison" for Dion's 1990 album of the same name, and Hill would go on to write "Seduces Me" for her 1996 album Falling into You.

== Background ==
The single was Dion's second commercial English-language release, following her 1985 track "Listen to the Magic Man". She included the song in her Unison Tour setlist.

== Critical reception ==
Graeme Boyce of RPM wrote that the material on Spellbound was well written, carefully produced, and suitable for radio. He also praised Dion's performance on "Can't Live with You, Can't Live Without You", calling it a clear choice for a second single.

== Commercial performance ==
"Can't Live with You, Can't Live Without You" entered the Canadian RPM charts in July 1989. It reached number 41 on the Top Singles chart, number 12 on the Adult Contemporary chart, and number 13 on the Canadian Content Singles chart. In Quebec, it peaked at number 19.

== Music video ==
The music video for "Can't Live with You, Can't Live Without You" won the Canadian Music Video Award for Best MOR (middle of the road) Video in 1990, a category recognizing mainstream pop.

== Formats and track listing ==
- Canadian 7-inch single
1. "Can't Live with You, Can't Live Without You" – 4:16
2. "Stop Me (Before I Dream Again)" – 3:40

== Charts ==
Chart performance
Chart (1989)	Peak position
Canada Top Singles (RPM)	41
Canada Adult Contemporary (RPM)	12
Canada Cancon Singles (RPM)	13
Quebec Radio Songs (ADISQ)	19

== Release history ==
Release history
Region	Date	Format	Label	Ref.
Canada	July 1989	7-inch vinyl	Columbia	
