= Unison (song) =

1983 song by Junior

Single by Junior

from the album All the Right Moves Soundtrack
- B-side: "Unison" (dub version)
- Released: October 1983
- Length: 5:38 (soundtrack version); 3:54 (7-inch version); 6:34 (12-inch version)
- Label: Casablanca
- Songwriters: Bruce Roberts; Andy Goldmark
- Producers: Bruce Roberts; Andy Goldmark

"Unison" is a song written by Bruce Roberts and Andy Goldmark, first recorded by English singer Junior in 1983 for the Tom Cruise film All the Right Moves. Although only a minor hit, the track drew renewed attention in 1990, when three female artists recorded their own versions for albums released that year. Laura Branigan included the song on her sixth, self-titled album. Expatriate American singer Lory Bianco recorded it for her album Lonely Is the Night. The most commercially successful rendition, however, was recorded by Celine Dion and used as the title track of her English debut album.

== Celine Dion version ==
"Unison"

Single by Celine Dion

from the album Unison
- B-side: "Unison" (single mix without rap)
- Released: July 1990
- Studio: 55; John Barnes; Steve Mitchell (Los Angeles); Skyline Midi; Unique (New York)
- Genre: Dance-pop
- Length: 4:12 (album version); 4:03 (single mix with rap)
- Label: Columbia
- Songwriters: Andy Goldmark; Bruce Roberts
- Producer: Andy Goldmark

Celine Dion singles chronology
"(If There Was) Any Other Way" (1990)	"Unison" (1990)	"Where Does My Heart Beat Now" (1990)

Music video
- "Unison" on YouTube

Canadian singer Celine Dion recorded "Unison" for her first English-language album of the same name (1990). Columbia Records issued the track as the album's second single in Canada in July 1990, and it was released as the fourth single in Japan the following year. Dion's version was produced by Goldmark.

After its release, "Unison" received positive reviews from music critics. It was nominated for the Juno Award for Dance Recording of the Year. The song reached number 38 in Canada and spent seven weeks at the top of the Canadian Dance Chart. The accompanying music video was directed by Robin Miller.

=== Background and release ===
In 1989, Dion recorded "Can't Live with You, Can't Live Without You", a duet with Billy Newton-Davis for his album Spellbound. The track was produced by Andy Goldmark. At the same time, Dion was working on her first English-language album, Unison. Goldmark produced the title track, which was released as the second single in Canada in July 1990. It was later issued as the fourth single in Japan on 4 November 1991. In other markets, "Unison" appeared as a B-side to "The Last to Know".

For the single release, Kevin Unger created four remixes: a single mix with rap, a single mix without rap, a mainstream / extended mix, and a club mix. Three of these include rap by Frankie Fudge. Ruth Pointer provided background vocals. The remixes required weeks of pre-production, with the aim of adapting the album version into a dance-pop track suitable for contemporary radio and club play. Mixing took place over three days at Toronto's Metal Works Studios.

=== Critical reception ===
Chicago Tribune's Jan De Knock wrote: "Dion's big voice invites comparisons to the power-pop stylings of Taylor Dayne and Laura Branigan (coincidentally, the disco-flavored title track 'Unison' also appears on Branigan's latest LP.)".

=== Commercial performance ===
In Canada, "Unison" debuted on the charts in July 1990 and peaked at number 38 on The Record's Retail Singles Chart on 17 September 1990. It also reached number seven on the RPM Adult Contemporary Chart.

=== Music video ===
The music video for "Unison" was created for the single mix with rap by Frankie Fudge and released in July 1990. It was directed by Robin Miller. The person shown rapping in the video is not Fudge. The video was later included on the Unison VHS.

=== Live performances ===
Dion performed "Unison" on several Canadian television programs in 1990. She also included it in her Unison Tour, Celine Dion in Concert, and The Colour of My Love Tour. The song appeared in the closing "Millenium Concert" of her Let's Talk About Love World Tour. It was performed as part of a medley with contestants from Star Académie in 2009, and later in a medley during her 2018 tour and the final year of her Las Vegas residency show, Celine.

=== Awards and accolades ===
At the Juno Awards of 1991, "Unison" (mainstream / extended mix) was nominated for the Juno Award for Dance Recording of the Year but lost to "Don't Wanna Fall in Love" (knife feel good mix) by Jane Child. It was also voted the song of 1990 in Quebec (ahead of Madonna's "Vogue") on the NRJ radio network's Le choix du Québec. The success of the remix arguably helped Sony Music Canada attract the attention of its US parent company, contributing to Dion's introduction to the US market.

=== Formats and track listing ===
- Canadian 7-inch single
1. "Unison" (single mix with rap) – 4:03
2. "Unison" (single mix without rap) – 4:03
- Canadian cassette single
1. "Unison" (single mix with rap) – 4:03
2. "Unison" (single mix without rap) – 4:03
3. "Unison" (mainstream / extended mix) – 7:15
- Canadian 12-inch single
1. "Unison" (mainstream / extended mix) – 7:15
2. "Unison" (club mix) – 7:26
- Japanese CD single
1. "Unison" (single mix with rap) – 4:03
2. "Délivre-moi" – 3:52
3. "Can't Live with You, Can't Live Without You" – 4:16
4. "Unison" (album version) – 4:12

=== Charts ===
==== Weekly charts ====
Weekly chart performance
Chart (1990)	Peak position
Canada Retail Singles (The Record)	38
Canada Contemporary Hit Radio (The Record)	27
Canada Top Singles (RPM)	45
Canada Adult Contemporary (RPM)	7
Canada Dance/Urban (RPM)	3
Quebec Radio Songs (ADISQ)	6

==== Year-end charts ====
Year-end chart performance
Chart (1990)	Position
Canada Adult Contemporary (RPM)	69
Canada Dance/Urban (RPM)	42

=== Credits and personnel ===
Recording

- Recorded at Studio 55, John Barnes Studio, Steve Mitchell's, Los Angeles, Skyline Midi Studio, and Unique Recording Studios, New York

Personnel

- Celine Dion – lead vocals
- Andy Goldmark – songwriter, producer, arranger, drum programming, bass synth, keyboards
- Bruce Roberts – songwriter
- Paul Pesco – guitars
- Charles Fearing – guitars
- John Barnes – keyboards
- "Ready" Freddy Washington – electric bass
- Fonzi Thornton – background vocals
- Biti "Beat Box" Strauchn – mouth percussion
- Fran Manzella – additional programming
- Dave Dachinger – additional programming, engineer
- Mike Brooks – engineer
- Jack Rouben – engineer
- Bob Rosa – mix
- Norene Rill – production coordination
- Kevin Unger – additional producer (remix only)
- Frankie Fudge – rap (remix only)
- Ruth Pointer – background vocals (remix only)

=== Release history ===
Release history
Region	Date	Format	Label	Ref.
Canada	July 1990	7-inch vinyl; 12-inch vinyl; cassette	Columbia	
Japan	25 October 1991	CD	SMEJ	
