= Did You Give Enough Love =

Promotional single by Celine Dion

from the album Celine Dion
- Released: July 1993
- Studio: Cove City Sound (New York)
- Genre: Pop
- Length: 4:21
- Label: Columbia
- Songwriters: Seth Swirsky; Arnie Roman
- Producer: Ric Wake

Music video
- "Did You Give Enough Love" on YouTube

"Did You Give Enough Love" is a song by Canadian singer Celine Dion from her eleventh studio album, Celine Dion (1992). Written by Seth Swirsky and Arnie Roman, and produced by Ric Wake, it was released as a promotional single in Canada in July 1993. The song entered several Canadian airplay charts, reaching number 17 on the RPM Top Singles, 19 on The Record Contemporary Hit Radio, 23 on the RPM Adult Contemporary, and 25 in Quebec.

== Background and release ==
"Did You Give Enough Love" was written by Seth Swirsky and Arnie Roman, and produced by Ric Wake. It was issued as a promotional single in Canada from Dion's self‑titled album Celine Dion. The single included two remixes created by Jean-Pierre Isaac.

== Critical reception ==
Billboard described the track as a "beat-laden" pop song. Parry Gettelman of the Orlando Sentinel wrote that Dion "really excels" on the dance‑oriented track, performed in the style of Lisa Stansfield.

== Commercial performance ==
In Canada, "Did You Give Enough Love" debuted on the RPM Top Singles chart on 17 July 1993 and peaked at number 17 on 14 August 1993. It also entered the RPM Adult Contemporary chart on 24 July 1993, reaching number 23 on 31 July 1993. On The Record's Contemporary Hit Radio chart, the song peaked at number 19 on 6 September 1993. It also entered the Quebec airplay chart on 7 August 1993, eventually reaching number 25 and spending 15 weeks on the chart.

== Music video ==
The black‑and‑white music video for "Did You Give Enough Love" was filmed in Montreal and directed by Alain DesRochers. It was released in July 1993. In July 2019, the video was uploaded to Dion's YouTube channel.

== Formats and track listing ==
- Canadian promotional CD single
1. "Did You Give Enough Love" (remix 45") – 4:22
2. "Did You Give Enough Love" (12" club mix) – 6:44
3. "Did You Give Enough Love" (album version) – 4:21

== Charts ==
Chart performance
Chart (1993)	Peak position
Canada Top Singles (RPM)	17
Canada Adult Contemporary (RPM)	23
Canada Contemporary Hit Radio (The Record)	19
Quebec Radio Songs (ADISQ)	25
