= Just Have a Heart =

Song by American R&B singer Angela Clemmons

"Just Have a Heart" is a song by American R&B singer Angela Clemmons from her second studio album, This Is Love (1987). Written by Aldo Nova, Billy Steinberg and Ralph McCarthy, and produced by Nova, the song was later adapted by Canadian singer Celine Dion, who recorded a French-language version, "Partout je te vois", for her 1987 album Incognito. Dion subsequently recorded the English-language version, titled "Have a Heart", for her first English-language album, Unison (1990).

== Celine Dion version ==
"Have a Heart"
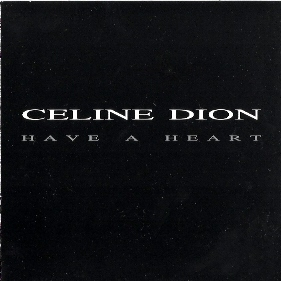

Promotional single by Celine Dion

from the album Unison
- Released: June 1991
- Studio: Chartmarker (Los Angeles)
- Genre: Pop
- Length: 4:14
- Label: Columbia
- Songwriters: Aldo Nova; Billy Steinberg; Ralph McCarthy
- Producer: David Foster

Audio
- "Have a Heart" on YouTube

In 1987, Dion recorded the French-language version of "Just Have a Heart", titled "Partout je te vois", for her eighth studio album, Incognito. She later included the English-language version, "Have a Heart", on her ninth studio album, Unison (1990). Released as the album's fifth promotional single in Canada in June 1991, the song reached number three in Quebec and appeared on several Canadian airplay charts, peaking at number four on the RPM Adult Contemporary chart, number 17 on The Record Contemporary Hit Radio chart, and number 26 on the RPM Top Singles chart.

=== Background and release ===
In 1987, Dion recorded "Partout je te vois", with lyrics by Eddy Marnay, for her album Incognito. In November 1987, she performed the original English-language version at the Juno Awards of 1987, where the positive reception helped secure a larger production budget for her first English-language album, Unison (1990). Dion recorded the English version for the album with producer David Foster. Foster received a nomination for the Juno Award for Producer of the Year for his work on "Have a Heart" and "Love by Another Name". "Have a Heart" was issued as a promotional single in Canada in June 1991. A live performance filmed at the Winter Garden Theatre in Toronto in March 1991 was included on the Unison home video released in July 1991.

=== Critical reception ===
Christopher Smith of TalkAboutPopMusic described "Have a Heart" as an "epic, slow number, perfect for spending those last few minutes of the night with someone special".

=== Commercial performance ===
In Canada, "Have a Heart" debuted on the RPM Top Singles chart on 13 July 1991 and peaked at number 26 on 14 September 1991. It also entered the RPM Adult Contemporary chart on 6 July 1991, reaching number four on 31 August 1991. On The Record Contemporary Hit Radio chart, it peaked at number 17 on 2 September 1991. The song also entered the Quebec radio chart on 13 July 1991, eventually reaching number three and spending 19 weeks on the chart.

=== Credits and personnel ===
Recording

- Recorded at Chartmaker Studios, Los Angeles
- Mixed at Lion Share Studios, Los Angeles

Personnel

- Celine Dion – lead vocals
- David Foster – producer, arranger, keyboards
- Aldo Nova – songwriter, arranger
- Billy Steinberg – songwriter
- Ralph McCarthy – songwriter
- Robbie Buchanan – keyboards, synth programming
- Randy Kerber – keyboards, synth programming
- Rick Bowen – synth programming
- Jeff Porcaro – drums
- Michael Landau – guitar
- Humberto Gatica – engineer, mix
- Jeffrey Woodruff – engineer
- David Reitzas – assistant engineer
- Laura Livingston – assistant mix engineer

=== Charts ===
==== Weekly charts ====
Weekly chart performance
Chart (1991)	Peak position
Canada Top Singles (RPM)	26
Canada Adult Contemporary (RPM)	4
Canada Contemporary Hit Radio (The Record)	17
Quebec Radio Songs (ADISQ)	3

==== Year-end charts ====
Year-end chart performance
Chart (1991)	Position
Canada Adult Contemporary (RPM)	21
