= Billy Newton-Davis =

American-Canadian singer (born 1951)

- Born: April 26, 1951 (age 74); Cleveland, Ohio, U.S.
- Origin: Toronto, Ontario
- Genres: R&B; jazz; gospel
- Occupation(s): Singer, songwriter
- Years active: 1980–present

Billy Newton-Davis (born April 26, 1951) is an American-Canadian R&B, jazz, and gospel singer and songwriter.

== Life and career ==
Newton-Davis grew up in Shaker Heights, Ohio, a suburb of Cleveland. He was one of two lead singers in a local soul band called The Illusions. After working as a singer and dancer on Broadway, he moved to Toronto, Ontario, in 1980. His debut album, Love Is a Contact Sport, won the Juno Award for best R&B/soul recording in 1986 and included the hits "Deeper", "Right Beside You", and "Find My Way Back".

His 1989 follow up, Spellbound, included his biggest Canadian chart hit, "I Can't Take It", as well as the Celine Dion duet "Can't Live With You, Can't Live Without You" and again won the Juno for best R&B/soul recording.

Newton-Davis subsequently joined The Nylons in 1991. Since leaving the Nylons, he has primarily concentrated on songwriting and live jazz and gospel performances. He also performed vocals on a number of Deadmau5 tracks, including "All U Ever Want" and "R My Dreams" from At Play Vol. 2.

In 2008, Newton-Davis won the Juno Award for All You Ever Want as Best Dance Album. Openly gay, his On A Boy's Life (2008) is a "celebration of all the naughty things men can get up to when left to their own devices." Diagnosed HIV-positive in 1986 at the height of his career, he first went public with his status in a documentary by Sylvia Sweeney that aired on Vision TV in 2000.

== Discography ==
=== Studio albums ===
- Love Is a Contact Sport (1986)
- Spellbound (1989)

=== Singles ===
==== As lead artist ====
- "Romance" (1981)
- "Right Beside You" (1986)
- "Find My Way Back" (1986)
- "Deeper" (1986)
- "Spellbound" (1989)
- "Can't Live with You, Can't Live Without You" (1989) (with Celine Dion)
- "I Can't Take it" (1989)

==== As featured artist ====
- The Boomtang Boys – "The Promised Land" (1995)
- deadmau5 – "Outta My Life" (2007)
- Nino Anthony – "Everything I Wanna Do" (2008)
- deadmau5 – "I Like Your Music" (2008)
- Nino Anthony – "Our House World" (2009)
- deadmau5 – "All You Ever Want" (2009)
- Spekrfreks vs Melleefresh – "Candy" (2010)
