= John Barnes (American musician) =

American keyboardist (1950–2022)

John Joseph Barnes (1950 – March 2022) was an American session musician keyboardist, synthesizer programmer, arranger, songwriter, and producer. Operating primarily out of Los Angeles, Barnes was a foundational studio figure in the evolution of R&B, pop, and electronic production throughout the 1970s, 1980s, and 1990s. He is widely recognized for playing the iconic, cascading opening piano solo on Gloria Gaynor's "I Will Survive", serving as a principal keyboardist and sound programmer for Michael Jackson's landmark solo albums, and contributing to the 1985 charity single "We Are the World”.

== Early life and education ==
Born and raised in Los Angeles, Barnes began his musical journey on the clarinet at age six. He went on to learn the bass, trombone, and drums while playing in local school ensembles, but did not officially take up the piano until age 19. He formally studied music theory and composition at California State University before entering the professional recording scene.

== Career ==
In the early 1970s, Barnes was hired by Motown Records, working interchangeably as a player, arranger, and composer. During this period, he served as the musical director for The Miracles and contributed key acoustic and Fender Rhodes piano tracks to Marvin Gaye's acclaimed 1976 album, I Want You.

In 1982, Michael Jackson recruited Barnes after hearing his innovative synth and drum programming work on local studio demos. Barnes quickly became a core component of Jackson's creative circle. During the development of the Bad album, Barnes—alongside engineers Bill Bottrell and Matt Forger—spent years stationed at Jackson's private Hayvenhurst home studio, translating the pop singer's rough ideas into fully realized synth arrangements before the tracks were finalized by Quincy Jones at Westlake Studios. He also co-wrote the track "We Are Here to Change the World" for Jackson's 1986 Disney 3D simulation film, Captain EO.

Aside from his works with Jackson, Barnes was a popular West Coast session musician amongst artists like Lionel Richie, Céline Dion, Whitney Houston, Toni Braxton, and Chaka Khan.

== Session Discography ==
The following table details Barnes' prominent studio contributions as a session musician, programmer, and rhythm arranger:

=== As featured session musician and arranger ===
| Year | Artist | Album / Single | Contribution / Instrument |
|---|---|---|---|
| 1976 | Marvin Gaye | I Want You | Keyboards, piano |
| 1978 | Gloria Gaynor | Love Tracks | Piano (performed the opening solo on "I Will Survive") |
| 1984 | The Jacksons | Victory | Synthesizer, arrangements |
| 1985 | USA for Africa | "We Are the World" (Single) | Rhythm arrangements, synthesizer programming |
| 1987 | Michael Jackson | Bad | Keyboards, synthesizers, rhythm arrangements |
| 1993 | Toni Braxton | Toni Braxton | Keyboards, co-writer ("Candlelight") |
| 1995 | Michael Jackson | HIStory: Past, Present and Future, Book I | Keyboards ("Earth Song") |
