= The Last to Know =

1991 single by Celine Dion

"The Last to Know" is a song by Scottish singer Sheena Easton, included on her 1987 album No Sound But a Heart. It was written by Brock Walsh and Phil Galdston, and produced by Nick Martinelli. Easton's album was not initially released in the US and only received limited release in other markets. Several songs from No Sound But a Heart were later recorded by other artists. "The Last to Know" was covered by Canadian singer Celine Dion for her 1990 English-language debut album, Unison.

== Celine Dion version ==
"The Last to Know"

Single by Celine Dion

from the album Unison
- B-side: "Unison"
- Released: March 1991
- Studio: West Side (London)
- Genre: Pop
- Length: 4:34
- Label: Columbia; Epic
- Songwriters: Brock Walsh; Phil Galdston
- Producer: Christopher Neil

Celine Dion singles chronology
"Where Does My Heart Beat Now" (1990)	"The Last to Know" (1991)	"Beauty and the Beast" (1991)

Music video
- "The Last to Know" on YouTube

Canadian singer Celine Dion recorded "The Last to Know" for her first English-language album, Unison (1990). The song was released by Columbia Records as the album's fourth single in Canada in March 1991, followed by releases in other regions later that year. Written by Brock Walsh and Phil Galdston, it was originally recorded by Sheena Easton in 1987. Dion's version was produced by Christopher Neil.

After its release, "The Last to Know" received positive reviews from music critics. It peaked at number 16 in Canada and number 7 on the Canadian Adult Contemporary chart. In the United States, it reached number 22 on the Hot Adult Contemporary Tracks. The accompanying music video was directed by Dominic Orlando. Dion performed the song during her Unison Tour.

=== Background and release ===
"The Last to Know" was one of three covers recorded by Dion for Unison. Produced by British record producer Christopher Neil, it was issued as the fourth single in Canada in March 1991, the third single in the United States in June 1991, and the third single in other international markets in September 1991. In the United Kingdom, it was released as the second single, following "Where Does My Heart Beat Now". The single's B-side included the remix of "Unison" in the United States and the album version elsewhere.

=== Critical reception ===
Larry Flick from Billboard wrote that Dion "returns to familiar ballad territory" and described the track as a "lovely tune". Jim Farber of Entertainment Weekly noted that songs such as "If Love Is Out the Question" and "The Last to Know" are "lush vehicles" elevated by Dion's distinctive voice. Christopher Smith from TalkAboutPopMusic described it as a "slow and sensual ballad with an atmospheric, synth-based arrangement".

=== Commercial performance ===
In Canada, "The Last to Know" entered the RPM Top Singles chart on 16 March 1991 and peaked at number 16 on 25 May 1991. It also reached number seven on the RPM Adult Contemporary chart. In the United States, the song debuted on the Billboard Adult Contemporary chart dated 13 July 1991 and peaked at number 22 on 31 August 1991.

=== Live performances ===
Dion performed "The Last to Know" on The Tonight Show in March 1991 and during her 1990–91 Unison Tour.

=== Formats and track listing ===
- Australian cassette and CD single; Japanese 3-inch CD single
1. "The Last to Know" – 4:34
2. "Unison" – 4:12
- Canadian cassette single; European 7-inch and cassette single
1. "The Last to Know" (edit) – 4:18
2. "Unison" – 4:12
- European CD single
1. "The Last to Know" (edit) – 4:18
2. "Unison" – 4:12
3. "If We Could Start Over" – 4:23
- US 7-inch and cassette single
1. "The Last to Know" (edit) – 4:18
2. "Unison" (remix) – 4:04

=== Charts ===
==== Weekly charts ====
Weekly chart performance
Chart (1991)	Peak position
Australian (ARIA)	134
Canada Top Singles (RPM)	16
Canada Adult Contemporary (RPM)	7
Canada Retail Singles (The Record)	17
Canada Contemporary Hit Radio (The Record)	13
Quebec Radio Songs (ADISQ)	1
US Adult Contemporary (Billboard)	22

==== Year-end charts ====
Year-end chart performance
Chart (1991)	Position
Canada Adult Contemporary (RPM)	56

=== Credits and personnel ===
Recording

- Recorded at West Side Studios, London

Personnel

- Celine Dion – lead vocals
- Christopher Neil – producer, backing vocals
- Brock Walsh – songwriter
- Phil Galdston – songwriter
- Steve Pigott – keyboards, bass, drums, percussion
- Alan Carvell – backing vocals
- Linda Taylor – backing vocals
- Simon Hurrell – engineer

=== Release history ===
Release history
Region	Date	Format	Label	Ref.
Canada	March 1991	Cassette	Columbia	
United States	June 1991	7-inch vinyl; cassette	Epic	
Japan	25 July 1991	3-inch CD	SMEJ	
Australia	2 September 1991	Cassette; CD	Columbia	
United Kingdom	4 November 1991	7-inch vinyl; cassette; CD	Epic	
United Kingdom	11 November 1991	7-inch vinyl with poster	Epic	
