= Where Does My Heart Beat Now =

Single by Celine Dion

from the album Unison
- B-side: "I Feel Too Much"
- Released: 1 October 1990
- Recorded: 1989
- Studio: West Side (London)
- Genre: Pop
- Length: 4:33
- Label: Columbia; Epic
- Songwriters: Robert White Johnson; Taylor Rhodes
- Producer: Christopher Neil

Celine Dion singles chronology
"Unison" (1990)	"Where Does My Heart Beat Now" (1990)	"The Last to Know" (1991)

Music video
- "Where Does My Heart Beat Now" on YouTube

"Where Does My Heart Beat Now" is a song recorded by Canadian singer Celine Dion for her ninth studio album and first English‑language release, Unison (1990). It was issued as the album's lead single in the United States and as the third single in Canada in October 1990, with further releases in other regions in early 1991. Written in 1988 by Robert White Johnson and Taylor Rhodes, the song was recorded by Dion the following year and produced by Christopher Neil. She first performed it publicly at the Eurovision Song Contest 1989 in Switzerland, where it appeared alongside her 1988 winning entry, "Ne partez pas sans moi".

"Where Does My Heart Beat Now" received positive reviews from music critics and earned an ASCAP Pop Award. It became the most commercially successful single from Unison and marked Dion's highest‑charting English‑language release at the time. The song reached number four on the US Billboard Hot 100, making her the first French‑Canadian artist to achieve a top‑10 hit on that chart. It also peaked at number two on the Adult Contemporary chart. Internationally, it entered the top 10 in Norway and Canada, reaching number four and number six, respectively. Two music videos were produced for the single. In 2008, the track was included on the North American edition of Dion's greatest hits compilation My Love: Essential Collection.

== Background and release ==
In 1989, Dion was recording her first English‑language album, Unison. Among the tracks selected for the project was "Where Does My Heart Beat Now", written by Robert White Johnson and Taylor Rhodes. On 6 May 1989, Dion performed the song for the first time during the Eurovision Song Contest in Lausanne, Switzerland. The song was then released as the third single from the album in Canada on 1 October 1990. It was also issued as the lead single from Unison in the United States in late 1990, and in early 1991 in the rest of the world.

== Critical reception ==
American magazine Billboard described the song as a "lushly framed single". Chicago Tribune editor Jan De Knock wrote that Dion "shines brightest on torchy love songs", citing "Where Does My Heart Beat Now" as an example. A reviewer from the Columbia Daily Tribune described it as a "swelling ballad". Dave Sholin of the Gavin Report noted, "Climbing the Adult Contemporary chart, this French-Canadian only learned to speak English three years ago—a surprising fact in light of the way she handles this stirring ballad". Chris Roberts of Melody Maker wrote, "Whitney/Mariah epic slush/lust ballad of the week. By Christ these millionairesses know how to give a chorus some welly. Utterly f*** fantastic, makes me roll around in satin sheets like a proper girlie." Pan-European magazine Music & Media praised it as a "slow-stepping emotional song, with an effective and dramatic build-up, brought to life by one of Canada's hottest singers of the moment". A reviewer for Music Week called it "a tense ballad which finds her deep in Gloria Estefan territory". Gene Sandbloom of The Network Forty stated, "Truly an epic production, this huge ballad has everything but cannon fire and missile explosions. With the deep and sincere vocals of French-Canadian Celine Dion". The Newcastle Evening Chronicle remarked on its "slow measured tempo on a sensually dramatic ballad". The Orlando Sentinel described it as a "splashy pop-gospel ballad".

Retrospective commentary has remained positive. About.com ranked "Where Does My Heart Beat Now" number five on its 2017 list of "Top 10 Celine Dion Songs". In a 2020 retrospective review, Matthew Hocter of Albumism named it the standout track on Unison and "the one that truly brought Dion to the masses". AllMusic senior editor Stephen Thomas Erlewine selected it as an album standout along with "(If There Was) Any Other Way". Talk About Pop Music's Christopher Smith described the track as a "power ballad" that showcases Dion's "vocal power".

== Commercial performance ==
In Canada, "Where Does My Heart Beat Now" entered the charts in October 1990 and reached number six on The Record's Retail Singles Chart on 8 April 1991. It also topped the RPM Adult Contemporary chart for two weeks in February 1991. In the United States, the song debuted at number 80 on the Billboard Hot 100 chart dated 8 December 1990. It peaked at number four on 2 March 1991, becoming Dion's first Billboard Hot 100 top‑10 entry and making her the first French‑Canadian artist to achieve a top‑10 hit on that chart. The track entered Billboard's Adult Contemporary chart dated 27 October 1990 and reached number two on 2 February 1991.

Internationally, "Where Does My Heart Beat Now" was successful in Norway, where it peaked at number four in March 1991, and it also reached the top 40 in Ireland, France, Belgium, the Netherlands, and New Zealand. The song additionally charted in Australia and the United Kingdom.

== Music video ==
Three versions of the music video were produced: a black-and-white Canadian version for the Canadian market (released in October 1990), a color performance version for US promotion (November 1990) directed by David Phillips, and a black-and-white edit combining the performance material with additional footage for the Unison home video (July 1991). The latter version was later uploaded to Dion's official YouTube channel in February 2013. It has accumulated more than 33 million views as of May 2024.

== Live performances ==
Dion first performed "Where Does My Heart Beat Now" at the Eurovision Song Contest 1989, along with the previous year's winning entry, "Ne partez pas sans moi". She later sang it on various Canadian and US television programs in 1990 and 1991, including The Tonight Show, Good Morning America, Live with Regis and Kathie Lee, Into the Night with Rick Dees, and Super Dave. Dion also performed the song on television in Norway and the Netherlands in 1991, as well as during the Juno Awards of 1991.

She included "Where Does My Heart Beat Now" in several concert tours: the Unison Tour, Celine Dion in Concert, The Colour of My Love Tour, D'eux Tour, Falling into You: Around the World, and her 2013 Sans attendre Tour. Live renditions are available on the DVD The Colour of My Love Concert (recorded in 1993) and on the 1994 CD À l'Olympia. Dion also performed the song in her 2011–19 Las Vegas residency show, Celine, between 2011 and 2018.

== Accolades ==
On 13 May 1992, "Where Does My Heart Beat Now" received an ASCAP Pop Award as one of the most-performed ASCAP songs during the 1991 survey year (1 October 1990 – 30 September 1991). Additionally, Dion's performance of the song at the Juno Awards of 1991 was nominated for a Gemini Award in the category Best Performance in a Variety Program or Series.

== Formats and track listing ==
- 7-inch, cassette, 3-inch CD, and CD single
1. "Where Does My Heart Beat Now" – 4:33
2. "I Feel Too Much" – 4:09
- European 12-inch and CD maxi-single
1. "Where Does My Heart Beat Now" – 4:33
2. "I'm Loving Every Moment With You" – 4:08
3. "I Feel Too Much" – 4:09

== Credits and personnel ==
Recording

- Recorded at West Side Studios, London

Personnel

- Celine Dion – lead vocals
- Christopher Neil – producer, backing vocals
- Robert White Johnson – songwriter
- Taylor Rhodes – songwriter
- Phil Palmer – guitar
- Andy Duncan – drums, percussion
- Wix – keyboards, bass
- Simon Hurrell – engineer

== Charts ==
=== Weekly charts ===
Weekly chart performance
Chart (1990–1993)	Peak position
Australia (ARIA)	62
Belgium (Ultratop 50 Flanders)	23
Canada Retail Singles (The Record)	6
Canada Contemporary Hit Radio (The Record)	23
Canada Top Singles (RPM)	22
Canada Adult Contemporary (RPM)	1
European Hot 100 Singles (Music & Media)	85
European Hit Radio (Music & Media)	10
France (SNEP)	20
Ireland (IRMA)	13
Israel (Israeli Singles Chart)	4
Luxembourg (Radio Luxembourg)	19
Netherlands (Dutch Top 40)	24
Netherlands (Single Top 100)	24
New Zealand (Recorded Music NZ)	36
Norway (VG-lista)	4
Quebec Radio Songs (ADISQ)	1
UK Singles (Official Charts)	72
UK Airplay (Music Week)	38
US Billboard Hot 100	4
US Adult Contemporary (Billboard)	2
US Cash Box Top 100	4

=== Year-end charts ===
1990 year-end chart performance
Chart (1990)	Position
Canada Adult Contemporary (RPM)	70

1991 year-end chart performance
Chart (1991)	Position
Canada Adult Contemporary (RPM)	9
European Hit Radio (Music & Media)	89
Norway Winter Period (VG-lista)	15
US Billboard Hot 100	37
US Adult Contemporary (Billboard)	7
US Cash Box Top 100	34

=== All-time charts ===
All-time chart performance
Chart (1975–2000)	Position
Canada (Nielsen SoundScan)	89

== Release history ==
Region	Date	Format(s)	Label	Ref.
United States	1 October 1990	Cassette	Epic	
Australia	21 January 1991	7-inch vinyl; cassette; CD	CBS	
United Kingdom	4 February 1991	7-inch vinyl; 12-inch vinyl; cassette; CD	Epic	
Japan	21 February 1991	Mini CD	SMEJ	
United Kingdom (re-release)	8 March 1993	7-inch vinyl; 12-inch vinyl; cassette; CD	Epic	

== See also ==
- Billboard Year-End Hot 100 singles of 1991
- List of Billboard Hot 100 top-ten singles in 1991
