= Unison (Celine Dion album) =

Studio album by Celine Dion
- Released: 2 April 1990
- Recorded: 1989–1990
- Studios: Chartmaker; John Barnes (American musician) (Los Angeles); Skyline Midi (New York); Steve Mitchell's (Los Angeles); 55 (Los Angeles); Unique (New York); West Side (London)
- Genre: Pop
- Length: 43:00
- Labels: Columbia; Epic
- Producers: David Foster; Andy Goldmark; Tom Keane; Christopher Neil

Celine Dion chronology
The Best of Celine Dion (1988)	Unison (1990)	Dion chante Plamondon (1991)

Singles from Unison
- 1. "(If There Was) Any Other Way" Released: March 1990; 2. "Unison" Released: July 1990; 3. "Where Does My Heart Beat Now" Released: September 1990; 4. "The Last to Know" Released: March 1991

Unison is the ninth studio album by Canadian singer Celine Dion and her first English‑language release. Issued on 2 April 1990 by Columbia Records and Epic Records, it blends dance‑pop and soft rock elements typical of late‑1980s mainstream production. The album was produced by David Foster, Christopher Neil, Tom Keane, and Andy Goldmark. Upon release, Unison received generally positive reviews, with critics noting Dion's vocal control, versatility, and the album's polished, contemporary sound.

Commercially, Unison marked Dion's breakthrough in the English‑speaking market. It reached number one in Quebec, number eight in Norway, and number 15 in Canada. The album was certified seven times platinum in Canada, platinum in the United States, and gold in the United Kingdom and France, with global sales reported at over four million copies. Up to five singles were issued depending on the territory. The most successful, "Where Does My Heart Beat Now", became Dion's first major US hit, peaking at number four on the Billboard Hot 100. At the Juno Awards of 1991, Unison won Album of the Year, and Dion was named Female Vocalist of the Year.

== Background ==
Throughout the 1980s, Dion released 11 French‑language studio albums in Canada and three in France, achieving notable commercial success. In Canada, Incognito (1987) was certified double platinum, Tellement j'ai d'amour... (1982) platinum, and Les chemins de ma maison (1983) and Mélanie (1984) gold. She reached the top of the Quebec charts with singles such as "D'amour ou d'amitié", "Mon ami m'a quittée", "Incognito", "Lolita (trop jeune pour aimer)", "Comme un cœur froid" and "D'abord, c'est quoi l'amour". Several of these recordings earned gold certifications.

Dion also became a well‑known figure in the Quebec music industry, winning 15 Félix Awards during the decade, including Female Vocalist of the Year, Album of the Year, Pop Album of the Year, Best Selling Album of the Year, Most Popular Song of the Year and Best Stage Performance of the Year. Her visibility increased in Europe when she represented Switzerland at the Eurovision Song Contest 1988 with "Ne partez pas sans moi", which won the competition.

Plans for an English‑language album began in the late 1980s. Initially, CBS Records offered a modest budget of $25,000 to record English vocals over existing Incognito tracks. However, three events led the label to increase its investment: Dion's duet with Dan Hill on "Can't We Try" at the CBS Canada 1987 convention, her performance of "Have a Heart" at the Juno Awards of 1987, and producer David Foster's interest after viewing the Juno performance. The budget eventually rose to $600,000, allowing for new material and high‑profile producers. Recording took place in London, New York, and Los Angeles.

Before the album's release, Dion recorded several English-language duets in 1989, including "Can't Live With You, Can't Live Without You" with Billy Newton-Davis, "Listen to Me" with Warren Wiebe for the film Listen to Me, and "Wishful Thinking" with Dan Hill. These tracks were not included on Unison.

== Content and release ==
Unison contains 10 tracks produced by four main contributors. British producer Christopher Neil worked on four songs, including the singles "Where Does My Heart Beat Now" and "The Last to Know". David Foster produced five tracks, among them "Have a Heart", originally recorded in French for Incognito. Andy Goldmark produced the title track, a cover of a song used in the film All the Right Moves.

The album was released on 2 April 1990 in Canada and on 11 September 1990 in the United States. International releases followed: 21 February 1991 in Japan, 4 March 1991 in Australia, and 16 September 1991 in the United Kingdom.

== Singles ==
In Canada, the album produced several successful singles. "(If There Was) Any Other Way" (March 1990), "Unison" (July 1990), "Where Does My Heart Beat Now" (September 1990), and "The Last to Know" (March 1991) all reached the Canadian Top 40. A promotional single, "Have a Heart", followed in June 1991. "Where Does My Heart Beat Now" became the most successful of the Canadian releases, peaking at number six and spending two weeks at number one on the Adult Contemporary chart.

In the United States, "Where Does My Heart Beat Now" marked Dion's first major chart success. Released in September 1990, it climbed to number four on the Billboard Hot 100. "(If There Was) Any Other Way" reached number 35, and "The Last to Know" was issued as the third US single. All three songs also charted on the Adult Contemporary ranking.

Internationally, "Where Does My Heart Beat Now" reached number four in Norway and charted in Ireland, France, Belgium, the Netherlands, New Zealand, Australia, and the United Kingdom.

== Promotion ==
Dion introduced material from Unison to international audiences on 6 May 1989 at the Eurovision Song Contest 1989, performing both her winning entry "Ne partez pas sans moi" and the future lead single "Where Does My Heart Beat Now". In 1990–1991, she promoted the album widely on television, marking a key stage in her transition to the English‑language market. Her first American appearance took place on The Tonight Show Starring Johnny Carson on 21 September 1990, followed by performances on Good Morning America, Live with Regis and Kathie Lee, Into the Night with Rick Dees, Super Dave, and additional visits to The Tonight Show. These appearances introduced her to a broad US audience and demonstrated her increasing ease as an English‑language performer.

In Canada, Dion performed songs from Unison at the Juno Awards of 1991. She also appeared on various national programs, including CBC specials and variety shows. She embarked on the Unison Tour, which sold out venues across the country and further strengthened her profile as a live performer. International promotion included televised performances in the Netherlands, France, and Norway, contributing to the album's growing international visibility.

== Critical reception ==
Professional ratings
Review scores
Source	Rating
AllMusic	3/5 stars
Calgary Herald	B−
Chicago Tribune	3/4 stars
Entertainment Weekly	B

Unison received generally positive reviews from music critics, many of whom praised Dion's vocal clarity, versatility, and confident move into the English‑language pop market. Jim Farber of Entertainment Weekly described her delivery as "tastefully unadorned", adding that the album presented a more polished approach to pop singing.

Stephen Thomas Erlewine of AllMusic called Unison "a fine, sophisticated American debut", pointing to its blend of contemporary pop and adult‑oriented material. Jan De Knock of the Chicago Tribune wrote that Dion handled both power‑pop and R&B‑leaning tracks with ease, viewing the album as a strong introduction to English‑language audiences.

== Commercial performance ==
In Canada, Unison saw strong commercial results, peaking at number 15 on the national chart and earning a seven‑times platinum certification for shipments exceeding 700,000 copies. It also performed particularly well in Quebec, where it reached number one for nine weeks and remained among the province's best‑selling albums throughout 1990. RPM magazine reported that the album's singles contributed to Dion becoming one of the most frequently played artists on Canadian adult contemporary radio in the early 1990s.

In the United States, the album reached number 74 on the Billboard 200 and was certified platinum for sales exceeding 1.2 million copies. Billboard also ranked Dion among the top female pop and adult contemporary artists of 1991, reflecting the album's growing presence and the strong performance of its singles on US radio. Music & Media noted that Dion's early English‑language success increased her visibility across European radio markets, particularly in the Benelux region.

Unison further expanded Dion's international profile, reaching number eight in Norway and charting in Belgium, where it benefited from the rising popularity of her English‑language recordings. The album later entered the UK chart in 1996, peaking at number 55 following the success of her subsequent releases. It was certified gold in both the UK and France. In Australia and New Zealand, the album received moderate airplay and contributed to Dion's growing recognition in the Oceania market.

Worldwide sales exceeded four million copies, reflecting the album's broad appeal and its role in establishing Dion's international career. Retrospective analyses have noted that Unison marked a turning point in Dion's commercial development, showing her ability to compete in the global pop market while maintaining strong support in Canada.

== Accolades ==
At the Juno Awards of 1991, Dion won both Album of the Year and Female Vocalist of the Year, becoming the first French‑Canadian artist to receive both honours. The title track's Mainstream Mix was nominated for Best Dance Recording, and David Foster received a nomination for the Producer of the Year.

At the Juno Awards of 1992, Dion again won Female Vocalist of the Year and was nominated for Entertainer of the Year. In Quebec, she received the Félix Award for Anglophone Artist of the Year in 1990 (though she publicly refused to accept the award as she did not consider herself an Anglophone artist), and in 1991 she won Artist of the Year Achieving the Most Success in a Language Other Than French (an award created in response to her refusal the previous year).

The Unison Tour was also well received, winning the Félix Award for Stage Director of the Year and earning a nomination for Lighting Designer of the Year.

Dion's rising popularity was further acknowledged with the Platinum Ticket Award for selling over 100,000 tickets in Quebec. Her performance of "Where Does My Heart Beat Now" at the 1991 Juno Awards earned a Gemini Award nomination, and the song also received an ASCAP Pop Award.

Two television specials, Céline Dion: Unison and Céline Dion: 10 ans déjà, also received multiple Gémeaux Awards nominations, with the former winning Best Variety Special.

== Track listing ==
No.	Title	Writer(s)	Producer(s)	Length
1.	"(If There Was) Any Other Way"	Paul Bliss	Christopher Neil	3:59
2.	"If Love Is Out the Question"	Bliss; Phil Palmer	Neil	3:53
3.	"Where Does My Heart Beat Now"	Robert White Johnson; Taylor Rhodes	Neil	4:33
4.	"The Last to Know"	Brock Walsh; Phil Galdston	Neil	4:36
5.	"I'm Loving Every Moment with You"	Tom Keane; Eric Pressly; Tyler Collins	David Foster; Keane	4:08
6.	"Love by Another Name"	Foster; Clif Magness; Glen Ballard	Foster	4:52
7.	"Unison"	Andy Goldmark; Bruce Roberts	Goldmark	4:12
8.	"I Feel Too Much"	Keane; Pressly	Foster; Keane	4:09
9.	"If We Could Start Over"	Stan Meissner	Foster	4:23
10.	"Have a Heart"	Aldo Nova; Billy Steinberg; Ralph McCarthy	Foster	4:15
Total length:				43:00

== Personnel ==
Adapted from AllMusic.

- Celine Dion – lead vocals, background vocals
- René Angélil – personal manager
- John Barnes (American musician) – keyboards, Synclavier, synthesizer, vocoder
- Andy Batwinas – assistant engineer, mixing assistant
- Paul Bliss – drums, keyboard programming, keyboards, programming, background vocals
- Michael Boddicker – percussion, programming, synthesizer, synthesizer programming
- Rev. Dave Boruff – programming, synthesizer programming
- Richard Bowen – programming
- Rick Bowen – programming, synthesizer, synthesizer programming
- Mike Brooks – engineer
- Robbie Buchanan – keyboards, programming
- Alan Carvell – background vocals
- Keith "KC" Cohen – mixing
- David Dachinger – engineer, programming
- Andy Duncan – drums, percussion (track 3)
- Chris Earthy – production coordination
- Charles Fearing – guitar
- David Foster – arranger, producer (tracks 5, 8), keyboards, background vocals
- Humberto Gatica – engineer, mixing
- Andy Goldmark – arranger, drum programming, keyboards, producer, programming, synthesizer, synthesizer bass
- Art Graham – artwork
- Simon Hurrell – engineer
- Paul Jackson Jr. – guitar
- Randy Jackson – bass (track 5)
- Tom Keane – arranger, keyboards, producer, programming, synthesizer, background vocals
- Randy Kerber – arranger, keyboards, programming, synthesizer programming
- Michael Landau – guitar, soloist
- Laura Livingston – assistant engineer, mixing assistant
- Vito Luprano – executive producer, producer
- Clif Magness – keyboards, programming
- Francis Manzella – programming
- Stan Meissner – arranger
- Christopher Neil – producer (tracks 1–4), background vocals
- Aldo Nova – arranger
- Phil Palmer – guitar
- Paul Pesco – guitar
- Steve Pigott – bass, drums (track 4), keyboards, percussion
- Ruth Pointer – background vocals
- Jeff Porcaro – drums (track 10)
- Dave Reitzas – assistant engineer, percussion
- Norene Rill – production coordination
- Bob Rosa – mixing
- Jack Rouben – engineer
- Biti Strauchn – percussion, voices
- Hugh Syme – artwork
- Linda Taylor – background vocals
- Fonzi Thornton – background vocals
- Freddie "Ready Freddie" Washington – bass
- Paul "Wix" Wickens – bass, keyboards (track 3)
- Jeffrey "Woody" Woodruff – engineer
- Richard Zuckerman – executive producer, producer

== Charts ==
=== Weekly charts ===
Weekly chart performance
Chart (1990–1997)	Peak position
Australian Albums (ARIA)	117
Belgian Albums (Ultratop Flanders)	80
Belgian Albums (Ultratop Wallonia)	56
Canada Top Albums/CDs (RPM)	15
Canadian Albums (The Record)	17
Norwegian Albums (VG-lista)	8
Quebec Albums (ADISQ)	1
Scottish Albums (Official Charts)	68
UK Albums (Official Charts)	55
US Billboard 200	74

=== Year-end charts ===
1990 year-end chart performance
Chart (1990)	Position
Canada Top Albums/CDs (RPM)	100
Canada Top Albums/CDs – Canadian Artists (RPM)	19

1991 year-end chart performance
Chart (1991)	Position
Canada Top Albums/CDs (RPM)	63
Canada Top Albums/CDs – Canadian Artists (RPM)	10

== Certifications and sales ==
Certifications
Region	Certification	Certified units/sales
Australia (ARIA)	Gold	35,000^{‡}
Canada (Music Canada)	7× Platinum	700,000^{^}
France (SNEP)	Gold	100,000^{*}
United Kingdom (BPI)	Gold	100,000^{^}
United States (RIAA)	Platinum	1,227,000
Summaries
Worldwide	—	4,000,000
^{*} Sales figures based on certification alone.^{^} Shipments figures based on certification alone.^{‡} Sales+streaming figures based on certification alone.

== Release history ==
Release history
Region	Date	Label	Format	Catalog
Canada	2 April 1990	Columbia	CD; LP; cassette	80150
United States	11 September 1990	Epic	CD; cassette	46893
Japan	21 February 1991	SMEJ	CD	ESCA-5184
Australia	4 March 1991	CBS	CD; cassette	467203
United Kingdom	16 September 1991	Epic	CD; LP; cassette	467203

== See also ==
- Juno Award for Album of the Year
