= (If There Was) Any Other Way =

Single by Celine Dion

from the album Unison
- B-side: "I'm Loving Every Moment with You"
- Released: March 1990
- Studio: West Side (London)
- Genre: Pop
- Length: 3:59
- Label: Columbia; Epic
- Songwriter: Paul Bliss
- Producer: Christopher Neil

Celine Dion singles chronology
"Can't Live with You, Can't Live Without You" (1989)	"(If There Was) Any Other Way" (1990)	"Unison" (1990)

Music video
- "(If There Was) Any Other Way" on YouTube

"(If There Was) Any Other Way" is a song recorded by Canadian singer Celine Dion for her first English-language album, Unison (1990). It was issued as the album's lead single in Canada in March 1990, by Columbia Records. In 1991, it was released as the second single in several other markets. The track was written by Paul Bliss and produced by Christopher Neil.

Upon release, "(If There Was) Any Other Way" received positive reviews from music critics. It reached number 23 in Canada and number 35 on the US Billboard Hot 100. It also performed well on adult contemporary radio, peaking at number eight in the United States and number 12 in Canada. Two music videos were created for the song, and Dion included it in the setlist of her Unison Tour (1990–91).

== Background and release ==
In 1990, Dion was preparing to issue her first English-language album, Unison. After releasing several French-language albums in Canada and France in the 1980s, she recorded new English songs in London, Los Angeles, and New York. Unison was first issued in Canada, and "(If There Was) Any Other Way" was selected as its lead single. Written by British musician Paul Bliss and produced by British record producer Christopher Neil, it was released in March 1990.

One year later, in March 1991, "(If There Was) Any Other Way" was issued as the second single in the United States after "Where Does My Heart Beat Now". For the US market, the single was remixed by Walter Afanasieff. This US version presents a different audio mix from the Canadian single and album versions: reverb was added throughout (most noticeably to Dion's vocal track), the guitars were rebalanced so that they are less audible in some parts of the song and more prominent in others, the drum track includes "rimshot" effects during the chorus, additional synthesizer lines were overdubbed onto the existing keyboard track (most noticeably in the bar before the instrumental break), and the fadeout was extended slightly. This mix was also used in the American music video released that year. Additionally, "(If There Was) Any Other Way" was remixed by Daniel Abraham, a French record producer based in New York, whose dance remixes appeared on a promotional US single.

"(If There Was) Any Other Way" was also issued as a single in selected European countries, Australia, and Japan in June 1991.

== Critical reception ==
AllMusic senior editor Stephen Thomas Erlewine named the song as one of the album's standout tracks, along with "Where Does My Heart Beat Now". Larry Flick from Billboard magazine wrote that Dion "continues to soar" with a "spirited, up-tempo" recording, praising its "crystalline production and shimmering backup vocal support combined with a passionate lead performance". Dave Sholin from the Gavin Report commented: "Nothing like witnessing the growth and development of a genuine artist. Celine definitely falls into that category, capturing the hearts of Americans the way she's been doing in her native Canada for the past several years. Switching from torch song to snappy rhythm affords listeners an opportunity to hear another side of this wonderful talent". Pan-European magazine Music & Media wrote that the "talented Canadian chanteuse enters the Whitney Houston racket" and described the track as "satisfying AC pop". Retrospectively, Christopher Smith from TalkAboutPopMusic called it a "pop-soft rock mid tempo number".

== Commercial performance ==
In Canada, "(If There Was) Any Other Way" entered the RPM Top Singles chart on 31 March 1990 and peaked at number 23 on 9 June 1990. The song also entered the RPM Adult Contemporary chart on 24 March 1990, reaching number 12. In the United States, "(If There Was) Any Other Way" debuted on the Billboard Hot 100 chart dated 6 April 1991 and peaked at number 35 on 1 June 1991. The track also entered Billboard's Adult Contemporary chart dated 30 March 1991, where it reached number eight.

== Music video ==
Two different music videos were produced for the song. The first, directed by Derek Case, was released in March 1990 for the Canadian market. The second was filmed for the US market in Los Angeles and Vancouver. Directed by Dominic Orlando, it premiered in March 1991. Both versions were included separately on Dion's 1991 home video Unison, depending on the Canadian or US release.

== Live performances ==
Dion performed "(If There Was) Any Other Way" on several Canadian television shows in 1990. She also sang it on the Canadian and US variety show Super Dave and performed it in Norway in 1991. The song was included in her Unison Tour as well.

== Formats and track listing ==
- Australian 7-inch, cassette, and CD single; Canadian 7-inch single
1. "(If There Was) Any Other Way" – 3:59
2. "(If There Was) Any Other Way" (instrumental) – 3:59
- Canadian cassette single; European 7-inch and 3-inch CD single; Japanese 3-inch CD single
1. "(If There Was) Any Other Way" – 3:59
2. "I'm Loving Every Moment with You" – 4:08
- European 12-inch and CD single
1. "(If There Was) Any Other Way" – 3:59
2. "I'm Loving Every Moment with You" – 4:08
3. "If We Could Start Over" – 4:23
- US 7-inch single
1. "(If There Was) Any Other Way" – 3:59
2. "Where Does My Heart Beat Now" – 4:33
- US cassette single
1. "(If There Was) Any Other Way" (Walter Afanasieff remix) – 4:13
2. "Where Does My Heart Beat Now" – 4:33
- US promotional CD single
1. "(If There Was) Any Other Way" (Daniel Abraham's 7" remix) – 3:54
2. "(If There Was) Any Other Way" (Daniel Abraham's 12" remix) – 5:39

== Credits and personnel ==
Recording

- Recorded at West Side Studios, London

Personnel

- Celine Dion – lead and backing vocals
- Christopher Neil – producer, backing vocals
- Phil Palmer – guitars
- Paul Bliss – songwriter, drums, keyboard programming, backing vocals
- Simon Hurrell – engineer
- Walter Afanasieff – additional producer, keyboards, percussion (remix only)
- Daniel Abraham – additional producer (dance remixes only)

== Charts ==
=== Weekly charts ===
Weekly chart performance
Chart (1990–1991)	Peak position
Canada Top Singles (RPM)	23
Canada Adult Contemporary (RPM)	12
Canada Retail Singles (The Record)	24
Canada Contemporary Hit Radio (The Record)	27
Quebec Radio Songs (ADISQ)	2
US Billboard Hot 100	35
US Adult Contemporary (Billboard)	8
US Top 100 Pop Singles (Cash Box)	32

=== Year-end charts ===
Year-end chart performance
Chart (1990)	Position
Canada Adult Contemporary (RPM)	84

== Release history ==
Release history
Region	Date	Format	Label	Ref.
Canada	March 1990	7-inch vinyl; cassette	Columbia	
United States	March 1991	7-inch vinyl; cassette	Epic	
Japan	25 April 1991	3-inch CD	SMEJ	
Australia	3 June 1991	7-inch vinyl; cassette; CD	CBS	
