= One Heart =

Studio album by Celine Dion
- Released: 24 March 2003
- Recorded: 2001–2003
- Studios: Atlantis, Maratone, Master Plan, Mono Music, Murlyn Music, SR 2, Sveriges Radio, The Location (Stockholm); Banaboat (Burbank); Capitol (Hollywood); Cove City Sound (New York); Digital Insight (Las Vegas); Echo Beach, Paradise Sound (Florida); Henson (Los Angeles); Metrophonic (England); Piccolo (Montreal); Le Bateau-Lune (Paris); Westlake Audio (West Hollywood)
- Genres: Pop; dance-pop
- Length: 53:23
- Labels: Columbia; Epic
- Producers: Peer Åström; Anders Bagge; Erick Benzi; Arnthor Birgisson; Kara DioGuardi; Humberto Gatica; Kristian Lundin; Vito Luprano; Max Martin; Rami Yacoub; Guy Roche; John Shanks; Mark Taylor; Ric Wake

Celine Dion chronology
A New Day Has Come (2002)	One Heart (2003)	1 fille & 4 types (2003)

Singles from One Heart
- 1. "I Drove All Night" Released: 24 February 2003; 2. "One Heart" Released: 26 May 2003; 3. "Have You Ever Been in Love" Released: 3 November 2003

One Heart is the nineteenth studio album, and the eighth English-language album, by Canadian singer Celine Dion. It was released by Columbia Records and Epic Records on 24 March 2003. Developed alongside her Las Vegas residency and a DaimlerChrysler endorsement, the album was recorded in just two weeks and marked a lighter, more playful departure from her traditional power-ballad style, blending contemporary pop with slower, more restrained material. Production was overseen by Max Martin, Rami Yacoub, Peer Åström, Anders Bagge, and Kristian Lundin, amon others.

The album received mixed reviews, with critics divided over its polished pop production and Dion's move away from her traditional adult-contemporary sound. While some praised its lighter material and vocal control, others criticized its lack of cohesion and formulaic songwriting. Commercially, One Heart was a major success, topping the charts in Canada and France, and selling more than five million copies worldwide. It also debuted at number two on the US Billboard 200 with 432,000 first-week sales and was certified double platinum by the Recording Industry Association of America (RIAA).

Promotion for One Heart centered on Dion's Las Vegas engagement and DaimlerChrysler endorsement, with television, advertising, and online campaigns replacing a conventional tour. The lead single, a cover of "I Drove All Night," featured prominently in Chrysler commercials and reached number 49 on the US Billboard Hot 100 while topping charts in Canada, Flanders, and Sweden. "Have You Ever Been in Love" and "One Heart" followed as singles, with the former reaching the top three on the US and Canadian Adult Contemporary charts and the latter reaching number 27 in the United Kingdom.

== Background and content ==
After her farewell millennium concert on 31 December 1999 in Montreal, Céline Dion took a two-year hiatus from her career, during which she gave birth to her first son, René-Charles Angélil, and largely withdrew from public life to focus on her family. Following the release of her 2002 album A New Day Has Come, Dion sought a way to remain closer to her young son while avoiding the disruption of constant touring, leading her to accept a five-year concert engagement at The Colosseum at Caesars Palace in Las Vegas. Coinciding with the beginning of her Las Vegas engagement, she signed a $10 million endorsement deal with DaimlerChrysler and recorded a cover of Roy Orbison's "I Drove All Night" for use in the company's advertising campaign. To ensure that the new material would not remain limited to the commercials, her record label asked Dion to record a new English-language album, using the DaimlerChrysler campaign and her high-profile engagement as key promotional opportunities while anticipating that her concert commitments would limit conventional promotion.

To accommodate Dion's demanding rehearsal schedule for her Las Vegas show, production on One Heart was completed in only two weeks before the end of January 2003. Dion described the album as "light and fun" but more emotionally raw than her previous work, reflecting a more relaxed and playful approach that moved beyond her trademark power-ballad style. She worked with established producers including Max Martin, Humberto Gatica, and Anders Bagge, with Vito Luprano as executive produce. Recorded in Las Vegas and Florida, the album combined contemporary uptempo pop with slower, more restrained material. Tracks such as "Naked," "Reveal," and "Love Is All We Need" featured a looser vocal approach, while "In His Touch" and "Je t'aime encore" adopted a more intimate torch-song style. Several songs on One Heart had previously appeared in other forms: "Sorry for Love" was re-recorded after its dance version appeared on A New Day Has Come, while "Coulda Woulda Shoulda" and "Have You Ever Been in Love" were also carried over from that album. "Je t'aime encore" was later recorded in French for 1 fille & 4 types.

== Promotion ==
Promotion for One Heart was closely integrated with Dion's Las Vegas engagement and her endorsement agreement with DaimlerChrysler Because her demanding performance schedule limited her availability for conventional promotion and ruled out a major international tour, Epic Records developed a campaign that combined the album with Chrysler's advertising campaign, the opening of A New Day... at The Colosseum at Caesars Palace, television appearances, and intense online promotion. To reinforce the connection between the album and her new Las Vegas residency, One Heart was released in North America on 25 March 2003, the same day the engagement officially opened.

An international press event was held in Las Vegas in late February, while release-week appearances included Today and The Oprah Winfrey Show. MSN named Dion its Artist of the Month and promoted the album through its PressPlay service, while additional online exposure was provided through Yahoo!, AOL, and Dion's official website. On 25 March, CBS broadcast a one-hour special documenting the preparation and opening of A New Day..., including a live performance from the show's opening night; the program was subsequently licensed for international broadcast. Several songs from One Heart were incorporated into a series of Chrysler advertisements, with Dion featured both driving on the open road and spending time with her son as part of Chrysler's Drive = Love campaign. In January 2003, Chrysler also became the primary sponsor of Dion's Las Vegas engagement, further linking the promotion of the album, its singles, and the concert.

=== Singles ===
The album's lead single, "I Drove All Night," was closely integrated with Dion's $10 million endorsement agreement with DaimlerChrysler. Although a series of commercials directed by Peter Arnell featured four songs from One Heart, "I Drove All Night" served as the campaign's centerpiece. The advertisements aired prominently during the Golden Globe Awards telecast on 19 January 2003, and following Dion's performance of "God Bless America" at Super Bowl XXXVII on 26 January, giving the song substantial exposure before its conventional radio promotion. It was subsequently added to approximately 200 US radio stations, reaching number 49 on the Billboard Hot 100 and number nine on the Adult Contemporary chart. Internationally, it reached number one in Canada, the Flemish region of Belgium, and Sweden.

"Have You Ever Been in Love" had previously appeared on Dion's A New Day Has Come (2002) but was reissued as the second single from One Heart in the United States and as the third single in selected international markets. It reached number two and number three on the US and Canadian Adult Contemporary charts, respectively. The album's title track, "One Heart," was released as the second single outside the United States and reached the top 40 in several countries, including number two of the Spanish Airplay Chart number 27 on the UK Singles Chart. Music videos for both songs, directed by director Antti Jokinen, were filmed back-to-back in Los Angeles on 29 and 30 April 2003. Two additional radio singles followed late in 2003: "Stand by Your Side" in the United States and "Faith" in Canada.

== Critical reception ==
Professional ratings
Review scores
Source	Rating
AllMusic	2.5/5 stars
Entertainment.ie	2/5 stars
Entertainment Weekly	B
The Guardian	2/5 stars
New York Post	2.5/4 stars
Now	1/5 Ns
Slant Magazine	3/5 stars

The album received mixed reviews from music critics. AllMusic's senior editor Stephen Thomas Erlewine awarded awarded One Heart two-and-a-half stars out of five, criticizing its lack of cohesion and arguing that its collaboration with Britney Spears producer Max Martin reflected a perceived attempt to remain commercially relevant. He also noted that "One Heart favors a smooth Vegas-showstopper gloss to radio-ready sheen, which only accentuates the lack of cohesiveness here" and argued that the album "reveals all her weaknesses". Chuck Arnold of People described the album as "a bit jarring at times," but praised its lighter sound and Dion's greater emphasis on upbeat dance, easy-listening rock, and country-pop influences. Dan Aquilante of the New York Post similarly praised the album's departure from Dion's traditional adult contemporary ballads, highlighting its stronger song selection and "Reveal" for showcasing her "exceptional vocal command."

Andrew Lynch of Entertainment.ie was more negative, writing that "Dion's songwriters seem to have been under strict instructions to keep the material as bland as possible" and that although her voice remained powerful, "she still doesn't sound as if she believes a word of what she's singing". He concluded that "One Heart is certainly one of her better collections – but frankly, that isn't saying very much". The Guardian's Betty Clarke wrote that "Dion proves she can be more than a series of hollow – if album-shifting – sentiments". Darryl Sterdan of Jam! gave a negative review, criticising the album as "full of unoriginal, instantly forgettable fluff – leftover Britney bubble-pop from Max Martin, cliché chest‑pounding power ballads, a title cut that's a blatant Shania soundalike, and a Cher‑style Eurodisco revamp of the Roy Orbison hit 'I Drove All Night', which she's already turned into a Chrysler jingle". Similarly, Sarah Liss from Now criticized One Heart's attempt to reposition Dion for pop crossover success, comparing its disco-pop production and presentation to contemporary teen-pop trends, while noting her more restrained vocal approach.

In contrast, a positive review came from Amazon's Rebecca Wallwork, who praised the album for "an unrelenting theme of joy and believing in one's self" and described it as "well timed and well executed". She added that "it contains no surprises, but then, besides her voice, that's one of Dion's biggest assets". In a more favourable review, Entertainment Weekly's Elisabeth Vincentelli questioned "why Celine gets so little respect?" and praised Dion's "uncanny ability to infuse sincerity into aural Hallmark cards and sound like the only person on earth who believes in true love". She concluded: "And in our age of postmodern ironists, isn't it refreshing to encounter someone who so genuinely loves her job?" Slant Magazine's Sal Cinquemani praised "the album as a whole", noting that "she continues the restrained approach of her last record, both in production and performance". He concluded that "One Heart may be the smartest album Dion could make at this stage in her career". Billboard also praised the album, stating: "One Heart may not crackle with the noise of an 'event' record, but it succeeds at something far more important: It is a fine piece of music".

== Accolades ==
One Heart received several award nominations and wins following its release, including recognition for Dion and its singles. In 2003, Dion won the American Music Award for Favorite Adult Contemporary Artist and was nominated for Favorite Pop/Rock Female Artist. In 2004, she also received the Dragon Award for International Female Artist of the Year, and "Have You Ever Been in Love" earned both an ASCAP London Award and a BMI London Award as one of the most performed songs in the United States. Dion was also nominated for four Juno Awards of 2004, including Artist of the Year, Album of the Year (One Heart), and the Fan Choice Award. Additional nominations included a Billboard Music Award for Hot Adult Contemporary Artist, a MuchMoreMusic Award for "I Drove All Night", and a Félix Award for Artist of the Year Achieving the Most Success in a Language Other Than French.

== Commercial performance ==
In Canada, One Heart debuted at number one, selling 97,000 copies in its first week, making it the biggest debut of the year. It spent eight weeks inside the top 10 of the Canadian Albums Chart and was certified triple platinum by the CRIA for shipments of 300,000 units. In France, One Heart also debuted at number one and remained there for two weeks. It was certified platinum in July 2003 for sales of 300,000 copies. The album also entered at number one in Denmark and Belgium's Flanders, remaining at the top for a second week in both countries. It was certified platinum in Denmark and gold in Belgium. One Heart topped the chart in Switzerland as well, where it was certified platinum, and reached number one in Greece, earning a gold certification. It became a top 10 album in many other European countries, including the United Kingdom, where it peaked at number four, was certified gold, and has sold over 204,000 copies. On the European Top 100 Albums, One Heart reached number two and was certified platinum by the IFPI for sales exceeding one million copies in Europe.

In the United States, One Heart entered the Billboard 200 at number two with first‑week sales of 432,000 copies. It fell to number four the following week, selling 166,000 units, and dropped to number eight in its third week with sales of 117,000 copies. It later reached number 11, selling an additional 116,000 units. In April 2003, the album was certified double platinum by the Recording Industry Association of America (RIAA) for shipments of two million copies. The album also reached the top 10 in Australia and New Zealand, earning platinum certifications in both countries. According to Billboard, One Heart was the 10th best‑selling album in the first half of 2003, with sales of 1.3 million. The IFPI also reported that One Heart was the 10th best‑selling album worldwide in 2003. It has sold over five million copies globally.

== Track listing ==
One Heart track listing
No.	Title	Writer(s)	Producer(s)	Length
1.	"I Drove All Night"	Billy Steinberg; Tom Kelly	Peer Åström; Vito Luprano	4:00
2.	"Love Is All We Need"	Max Martin; Rami Yacoub	Martin; Yacoub	3:49
3.	"Faith"	Martin; Yacoub	Martin; Yacoub	3:42
4.	"In His Touch"	Martin; Yacoub	Martin; Yacoub	3:54
5.	"One Heart"	John Shanks; Kara DioGuardi	Shanks; DioGuardi	3:24
6.	"Stand by Your Side"	Paul Barry; Mark Taylor	Taylor; Humberto Gatica	3:33
7.	"Naked"	Anders Bagge; Åström; Troy Verges	Bagge; Åström; Luprano	3:40
8.	"Sorry for Love" (2003 version)	DioGuardi; Bagge; Åström; Arnthor Birgisson	Bagge; Åström	4:27
9.	"Have You Ever Been in Love"	Bagge; Åström; Thomas Nichols; Daryl Hall; Laila Bagge	Bagge; Åström	4:08
10.	"Reveal"	Cathy Dennis; Greg Wells	Ric Wake; Richie Jones^{[a]}	4:11
11.	"Coulda Woulda Shoulda"	Kristian Lundin; Andreas Carlsson	Lundin	3:27
12.	"Forget Me Not"	Guy Roche; Shelly Peiken	Roche	4:06
13.	"I Know What Love Is"	Wake; Arnie Roman	Wake; Jones^{[a]}	4:28
14.	"Je t'aime encore"	Jean-Jacques Goldman; J. Kapler	Erick Benzi	3:24
Total length:				53:23

=== Notes ===
- ^{^a} signifies an additional producer
- In June 2004, a bonus DVD titled One Year... One Heart was included with some editions of A New Day... Live in Las Vegas. It contains the recording of "I Drove All Night" and "Have You Ever Been in Love", the making of the "One Heart" music video, and other content.

== Charts ==
=== Weekly charts ===
Weekly chart performance
Chart (2003)	Peak position
Australian Albums (ARIA)	6
Austrian Albums (Ö3 Austria)	5
Belgian Albums (Ultratop Flanders)	1
Belgian Albums (Ultratop Wallonia)	3
Canadian Albums (Billboard)	1
Czech Albums (ČNS IFPI)	13
Danish Albums (Hitlisten)	1
Dutch Albums (Album Top 100)	3
European Albums (Music & Media)	2
Finnish Albums (Suomen virallinen lista)	3
French Albums (SNEP)	1
German Albums (Offizielle Top 100)	6
Greek Foreign Albums (IFPI)	1
Hungarian Albums (MAHASZ)	14
Irish Albums (IRMA)	10
Italian Albums (FIMI)	3
Japanese Albums (Oricon)	27
New Zealand Albums (RMNZ)	7
Norwegian Albums (VG-lista)	2
Polish Albums (ZPAV)	5
Portuguese Albums (AFP)	3
Quebec (ADISQ)	1
Scottish Albums (Official Charts)	4
Spanish Albums (PROMUSICAE)	3
Swedish Albums (Sverigetopplistan)	3
Swiss Albums (Schweizer Hitparade)	1
UK Albums (Official Charts)	4
US Billboard 200	2

=== Monthly charts ===
Monthly chart performance
Chart (2003)	Peak position
South Korean Albums (RIAK)	2

=== Year-end charts ===
Year-end chart performance
Chart (2003)	Position
Australian Albums (ARIA)	88
Austrian Albums (Ö3 Austria)	48
Belgian Albums (Ultratop Flanders)	15
Belgian Albums (Ultratop Wallonia)	33
Danish Albums (Hitlisten)	17
Dutch Albums (Album Top 100)	17
Finnish Foreign Albums (Suomen virallinen lista)	13
French Albums (SNEP)	43
German Albums (Offizielle Top 100)	43
Hungarian Albums (MAHASZ)	71
Italian Albums (FIMI)	50
New Zealand Albums (RMNZ)	47
Norwegian Russefeiring Period Albums (VG-lista)	9
Swedish Albums (Sverigetopplistan)	38
Swiss Albums (Schweizer Hitparade)	17
UK Albums (OCC)	108
US Billboard 200	33
Worldwide Albums (IFPI)	10

=== All-time charts ===
All-time chart performance
Chart	Position
Canadian Artists Albums (SoundScan)	62

== Certifications and sales ==
Certifications
Region	Certification	Certified units/sales
Australia (ARIA)	Platinum	70,000^{^}
Austria (IFPI Austria)	Gold	15,000^{*}
Belgium (BRMA)	Gold	25,000^{*}
Canada (Music Canada)	3× Platinum	300,000^{^}
Denmark (IFPI Danmark)	Platinum	50,000^{^}
Finland (Musiikkituottajat)	Gold	17,299
France (SNEP)	Platinum	300,000^{*}
Germany (BVMI)	Gold	100,000^{^}
Greece (IFPI Greece)	Gold	10,000^{^}
New Zealand (RMNZ)	Platinum	15,000^{^}
Norway (IFPI Norway)	Gold	20,000^{*}
Portugal (AFP)	Silver	10,000^{^}
Spain (Promusicae)	Gold	50,000^{^}
Sweden (GLF)	Gold	30,000^{^}
Switzerland (IFPI Switzerland)	Platinum	40,000^{^}
United Kingdom (BPI)	Gold	204,075
United States (RIAA)	2× Platinum	2,000,000^{^}
Summaries
Europe (IFPI)	Platinum	1,000,000^{*}
Worldwide	—	5,000,000
^{*} Sales figures based on certification alone.^{^} Shipments figures based on certification alone.

== Release history ==
Release history
Region	Date	Label	Format	Catalog
Europe	24 March 2003	Columbia	CD; cassette	510877 2
Canada	25 March 2003	Columbia	CD; cassette	87185
United States	25 March 2003	Epic	CD; cassette	87185
Japan	26 March 2003	SMEJ	CD	EICP-200
Australia	28 March 2003	Epic	CD; cassette	5108772

== See also ==
- List of number-one albums from the 2000s (Denmark)
- List of number-one albums of 2003 (Canada)
- List of number-one singles of 2003 (France)
