= Miracle (Celine Dion album) =

Studio album by Celine Dion
- Released: 11 October 2004
- Recorded: 2004
- Studios: Digital Insights Recording; Chartmarker; Sony
- Genre: Pop
- Length: 55:08
- Languages: English; French
- Labels: Columbia; Epic
- Producer: David Foster

Celine Dion chronology
A New Day... Live in Las Vegas (2004)	Miracle (2004)	On ne change pas (2005)

Singles from Miracle
- 1. "Beautiful Boy" Released: 4 October 2004; 2. "In Some Small Way" Released: 7 March 2005

Miracle is the twenty-first studio album and ninth English-language album by Canadian singer Celine Dion, released by Columbia Records and Epic Records on 11 October 2004. It is a concept album created in collaboration with Australian photographer Anne Geddes. The songs were produced by David Foster. Miracle topped the chart in Canada and Belgium's Wallonia, and reached the top five in the United States, the United Kingdom, France, and the Netherlands. It was certified platinum in the US and Canada, and gold in several other countries.

== Content and release ==
Miracle is part of a CD-and-book multimedia collection, with Dion's music serving as the soundtrack to Geddes's pictorial book celebrating the joy of babies. The songs were produced by David Foster, who had not collaborated with Dion since 1999.

The album includes cover versions of John Lennon's "Beautiful Boy", Louis Armstrong's "What a Wonderful World", Roberta Flack's "The First Time Ever I Saw Your Face", Johannes Brahms's "Brahms's Lullaby", Nancy Wilson's "If I Could", Henri Salvador's "Le loup, la biche et le chevalier (une chanson douce)", and Carol Welsman's "Baby Close Your Eyes".

All other tracks are original songs, including the title track, which was written in 2001 for A New Day Has Come to celebrate the birth of Dion's son René-Charles, although it was not included on that album.

Some tracks had been previously released on Dion's albums, such as "Brahms's Lullaby" on These Are Special Times and "The First Time Ever I Saw Your Face" on All the Way... A Decade of Song. Live performances of "If I Could" and "What a Wonderful World" appeared on A New Day... Live in Las Vegas. "A Mother's Prayer" is a solo version of "The Prayer", a duet with Andrea Bocelli from These Are Special Times. "Le loup, la biche et le chevalier (une chanson douce)" was performed live by Dion and Henri Salvador in October 2003 during the taping of the 1 fille & 4 types TV special, although this duet version was not included on any album.

Miracle was released in three formats: CD; CD/DVD with a 60-page booklet; and a 180-page hardcover book with CD/DVD. "Je lui dirai", previously available on 1 fille & 4 types, was included as a bonus track in Francophone countries.

== Singles ==
"Beautiful Boy" was released as the first single in North America and in several European territories. It was followed by "In Some Small Way" in the United States and Canada. "Je lui dirai" was issued as a single in Francophone countries, while the title track was released in the United Kingdom and parts of Asia. All of these songs were serviced to radio without accompanying music videos.

== Critical reception ==
Professional ratings
Review scores
Source	Rating
AllMusic	3/5 stars
Entertainment Weekly	C

Miracle received mixed reviews. AllMusic wrote that "it's the quietest record Dion has recorded in a while, an unabashed adult contemporary album that keeps its gentle mood from start to finish, as if it were a prolonged lullaby. Dion tempers her vocal histrionics considerably — she still soars to the high notes, but there are no pyrotechnics, no showboating here — which serves this collection of standards and new songs quite well".

== Commercial performance ==
Miracle debuted inside the top 10 in many countries, reaching number one in Canada and Belgium's Wallonia. It entered the chart at number four in the United States with 107,000 copies sold. It also debuted at number four in France and the Netherlands, number five in the United Kingdom, number six in Switzerland, and number nine in Greece. Miracle set a record in the United States, spending 18 consecutive weeks at number one on the Billboard Top Kid Audio chart.

The album was certified platinum in the United States and Canada, and gold in the United Kingdom, France, Switzerland, Italy, and Belgium. Three months after its release, the Miracle CD had sold more than two million copies worldwide. The book/CD/DVD package was also successful, reaching 500,000 copies sold.

== Accolades ==
At the Juno Awards of 2005, Miracle was nominated in two categories: Album of the Year and Pop Album of the Year. Dion also received a nomination for the Juno Award for Artist of the Year. Miracle was additionally nominated for the Félix Award in the Anglophone Album of the Year category.

== Track listing ==
All tracks were produced by David Foster.

No.	Title	Writer(s)	Length
1.	"Miracle"	Steve Dorff; Linda Thompson	3:37
2.	"Brahms' Lullaby"	Johannes Brahms	3:32
3.	"If I Could"	Ron Miller; Ken Hirsch; Marti Sharron	4:46
4.	"Sleep Tight"	Richard Page; Jon Lind; John Lang	4:39
5.	"What a Wonderful World"	George David Weiss; Bob Thiele	3:47
6.	"My Precious One"	Peer Åström; Stephanie Bentley	3:50
7.	"A Mother's Prayer"	Foster; Carole Bayer Sager	3:41
8.	"The First Time Ever I Saw Your Face"	Ewan MacColl	4:10
9.	"Baby Close Your Eyes"	Carol Welsman; Romano Musumarra	3:24
10.	"Come to Me"	Beverley Mahood; Thomas Wade	4:33
11.	"Le loup, la biche et le chevalier (une chanson douce)"	Maurice Pon; Henri Salvador	3:13
12.	"Beautiful Boy"	John Lennon	3:53
13.	"In Some Small Way"	Page; David Tyson	5:06
Total length:			55:08

== Notes ==
- The French edition also includes "Je lui dirai".
- The limited edition includes a bonus DVD with The Making of Miracle.

== Charts ==
=== Weekly charts ===
Weekly chart performance
Chart (2004)	Peak position
Australian Albums (ARIA)	15
Austrian Albums (Ö3 Austria)	34
Belgian Albums (Ultratop Flanders)	13
Belgian Albums (Ultratop Wallonia)	1
Canadian Albums (Billboard)	1
Czech Albums (ČNS IFPI)	51
Danish Albums (Hitlisten)	12
Dutch Albums (Album Top 100)	4
European Albums (Music & Media)	6
French Albums (SNEP)	4
German Albums (Offizielle Top 100)	34
Greek Foreign Albums (IFPI)	9
Hungarian Albums (MAHASZ)	84
Italian Albums (FIMI)	15
Japanese Albums (Oricon)	168
New Zealand Albums (RMNZ)	26
Polish Albums (ZPAV)	15
Portuguese Albums (AFP)	19
Quebec (ADISQ)	1
Scottish Albums (Official Charts)	9
Spanish Albums (PROMUSICAE)	77
Swedish Albums (Sverigetopplistan)	30
Swiss Albums (Schweizer Hitparade)	6
UK Albums (Official Charts)	5
US Billboard 200	4
US Top Kid Audio (Billboard)	1

=== Year-end charts ===
2004 year-end chart performance
Chart (2004)	Position
Belgian Albums (Ultratop Flanders)	72
Belgian Albums (Ultratop Wallonia)	26
Dutch Albums (Album Top 100)	66
French Albums (SNEP)	96
US Top Kid Audio (Billboard)	3

2005 year-end chart performance
Chart (2005)	Position
US Billboard 200	151
US Top Kid Audio (Billboard)	1

=== Decade-end charts ===
Decade-end chart performance
Chart (2000–2009)	Position
US Top Kid Audio (Billboard)	11

== Certifications and sales ==
Certifications
Region	Certification	Certified units/sales
Belgium (BRMA)	Gold	25,000^{*}
Canada (Music Canada)	Platinum	100,000^{‡}
France (SNEP)	Gold	100,000^{*}
Switzerland (IFPI Switzerland)	Gold	20,000^{^}
United Kingdom (BPI)	Gold	109,963
United States (RIAA)	Platinum	1,000,000^{^}
^{*} Sales figures based on certification alone.^{^} Shipments figures based on certification alone.^{‡} Sales+streaming figures based on certification alone.

== Release history ==
Release history
Region	Date	Label	Format	Catalog
Europe	11 October 2004	Columbia	CD	5187482; 5187489 (French edition)
Europe	11 October 2004	Columbia	CD/DVD	5187487; 5187483 (French edition)
United States	12 October 2004	Epic	CD	93453
United States	12 October 2004	Epic	CD/DVD	93454
Canada	12 October 2004	Columbia	CD	5187482
Canada	12 October 2004	Columbia	CD/DVD	5187487
Australia	15 October 2004	Epic	CD	5187482
Australia	15 October 2004	Epic	CD/DVD	5187487
Japan	22 December 2004	SMEJ	CD	EICP-464

== See also ==
- List of number-one albums of 2004 (Canada)
