= You and I (Celine Dion song) =

Promotional single by Celine Dion

from the album A New Day... Live in Las Vegas
- Released: 24 May 2004
- Recorded: 2004
- Studio: Masterplan
- Genre: Pop
- Length: 4:05
- Label: Columbia; Epic
- Songwriters: Aldo Nova; Jacques Duval
- Producers: Peer Åström; Vito Luprano; Aldo Nova

Music video
- "You and I" on YouTube

"You and I" is a song recorded by Canadian singer Celine Dion. It was released in May 2004 as a promotional single from her album A New Day... Live in Las Vegas. Written by Aldo Nova and Jacques Duval, the track was produced by Peer Åström, Vito Luprano, and Nova. In October 2008, it was added to the European edition of Dion's greatest hits album My Love: Ultimate Essential Collection.

== Background and release ==
In October 2004, Air Canada selected "You and I" as the central song for its new advertising campaign, introduced alongside updated in‑flight services and refreshed aircraft livery. Dion also recorded a one‑minute French version, "Mes ailes à moi", and both recordings were incorporated into the airline's promotional materials.

On 19 June 2007, US Senator Hillary Clinton announced that "You and I" would serve as her campaign song in her 2008 bid for the Democratic Party nomination. The track was selected following a month‑long online vote.

== Critical reception ==
Chuck Taylor of Billboard described "You and I" as "plucky" and radio‑friendly, noting its stylistic similarity to Dion's hit "That's the Way It Is". He praised her confident, unforced vocal delivery and the subtle nuances characteristic of her work.

== Commercial performance ==
"You and I" achieved notable airplay success in Canada. It topped the Canadian Adult Contemporary chart for five non‑consecutive weeks during July and August 2004 and spent a total of 34 weeks on the listing.

== Music video ==
The music video, directed by Andrew MacNaughtan in July 2004, was filmed partly at Toronto Pearson International Airport. It premiered two months later and was subsequently included on the Ultimate Box, released in Japan in 2008.

== Accolades ==
The video received a nomination for the MuchMoreMusic Award at the 2005 MuchMusic Video Awards.

== Charts ==
=== Weekly charts ===
Weekly chart performance
Chart (2004)	Peak position
Belgium (Ultratop Airplay Flanders)	43
Belgium (Ultratop Airplay Wallonia)	30
Canada AC (Radio & Records)	1
CIS Airplay (TopHit)	123
Czech Republic (Rádio Top 50)	26
Denmark Airplay (Tracklisten)	14
Germany (Airplay Chart)	19
Hungary (Rádiós Top 40)	2
Norway (VG-lista Airplay)	17
Poland (National Airplay Chart)	9
Quebec Radio Songs (ADISQ)	2
United Kingdom (Airplay Chart)	64
US Adult Contemporary (Billboard)	16

=== Year-end charts ===
2024 year-end chart performance
Chart (2004)	Position
Canada AC (Radio & Records)	5
Hungary (Rádiós Top 40)	33
US Adult Contemporary (Billboard)	31

2025 year-end chart performance
Chart (2005)	Position
Canada AC (Radio & Records)	22
US Adult Contemporary (Radio & Records)	82
