= A New Day... Live in Las Vegas =

Live album by Celine Dion
- Released: 14 June 2004
- Recorded: 19–23 November 2003
- Venue: The Colosseum at Caesars Palace (Las Vegas)
- Genre: Pop
- Length: 58:56
- Language: English; French
- Label: Columbia; Epic
- Producer: Peer Åström; Anders Bagge; Vito Luprano; Aldo Nova

Celine Dion chronology
1 fille & 4 types (2003)	A New Day... Live in Las Vegas (2004)	Miracle (2004)

A New Day... Live in Las Vegas is the first predominantly English-language live album by Canadian singer Celine Dion, released by Columbia Records and Epic Records on 14 June 2004. It includes songs from Dion's Las Vegas residency show, A New Day.... The album also contains studio recordings of two new tracks: "You and I" and "Ain't Gonna Look the Other Way". A New Day... Live in Las Vegas reached the top 10 in Canada, the United States, France, Belgium, and Greece, and was certified gold in the United States and Greece, and silver in the United Kingdom.

== Content ==
A New Day... Live in Las Vegas includes 13 live tracks from Dion's successful Las Vegas show, titled A New Day..., and two previously unreleased studio recordings: "You and I" and "Ain't Gonna Look the Other Way". It was also issued with a bonus DVD containing a 45-minute documentary titled One Year... One Heart.

The album features five live songs that had not appeared on Dion's earlier releases: "Fever", "I've Got the World on a String", "I Wish", "If I Could", and "What a Wonderful World". Studio versions of the last two tracks were later included on her album Miracle.

"If I Could" was first recorded by Nancy Wilson for her 1988 album Nancy Now!. In 1993 Ray Charles recorded his version for My World, and Regina Belle included it on her album Passion. Barbra Streisand also recorded the song for her 1997 album Higher Ground.

The French edition of A New Day... Live in Las Vegas includes "Contre nature" as a bonus track.

The originally planned release of the Live in Las Vegas - A New Day... DVD in autumn 2004 was postponed due to changes and improvements made to the show after the initial filming. A New Day... was re-shot in high-definition between 17 and 21 January 2007 and released on 7 December 2007. The two-disc DVD contains more than 5 hours of previously unseen material, including the concert and three exclusive documentaries. Live performances of "Nature Boy", "At Last", "Fever", "Et je t'aime encore", and "What a Wonderful World" are available only on the A New Day... Live in Las Vegas CD, as they had been removed from the show by the time the DVD was filmed.

== Critical reception ==
Professional ratings
Review scores
Source	Rating
AllMusic	link

The album received generally positive reviews. AllMusic wrote that "this live document of the Las Vegas show drives home the point that Celine is one of the most potent entertainers in adult contemporary music". They added that Dion is "equally as comfortable in high-tempo numbers chock-full of her signature vocal acrobatics as she is in quiet, contemplative moments. It's an ideal souvenir for those who have experienced the magic with their own ears and eyes. And while it's not the most definitive document of Dion's career, it certainly is a stirring testament to her accomplishments as the standard to whom most vocalists aspire".

== Commercial performance ==
A New Day... Live in Las Vegas opened at number 10 on Billboard 200 with 58,000 copies sold. As of 2010, it has sold 530,000 copies in the United States and was certified gold by the RIAA. It was also certified silver in the UK. The album reached the top 10 in several markets, including number one in Greece and Quebec, number two in Canada, number four in Belgium's Wallonia, number seven in Belgium Flanders, number nine in France, and number 10 in the United States.

== Accolades ==
In 2005, A New Day... Live in Las Vegas was nominated for the Félix Award in the Anglophone Album of the Year category.

== Track listing ==
The album includes 13 live tracks and two studio recordings: "You and I", produced by Aldo Nova and Peer Åström, and "Ain't Gonna Look the Other Way", produced by Anders Bagge, Åström, and Vito Luprano.

No.	Title	Writer(s)	Length
1.	"Nature Boy"	Eden Ahbez	4:13
2.	"It's All Coming Back to Me Now"	Jim Steinman	3:37
3.	"Because You Loved Me"	Diane Warren	2:28
4.	"I'm Alive"	Kristian Lundin; Andreas Carlsson	4:15
5.	"If I Could"	Ken Hirsch; Marti Sharron; Ron Miller	5:15
6.	"At Last"	Mack Gordon; Harry Warren	3:30
7.	"Fever"	Otis Blackwell; Eddie Cooley	2:53
8.	"I've Got the World on a String"	Ted Koehler; Harold Arlen	2:23
9.	"Et je t'aime encore"	Jean-Jacques Goldman; J. Kapler	4:42
10.	"I Wish"	Stevie Wonder	4:13
11.	"I Drove All Night"	Billy Steinberg; Tom Kelly	4:48
12.	"My Heart Will Go On"	James Horner; Will Jennings	5:24
13.	"What a Wonderful World"	George David Weiss; Bob Thiele	4:45
14.	"You and I" (studio recording)	Nova; Jacques Duval	4:05
15.	"Ain't Gonna Look the Other Way" (studio recording)	Tracy Ackerman; Bagge; Åström	4:25
Total length:			58:56

=== Notes ===
- The French edition also includes "Contre nature".
- The limited edition includes a bonus DVD with One Year... One Heart.

== Charts ==
Chart performance
Chart (2004–2010)	Peak position
Australian Albums (ARIA)	69
Austrian Albums (Ö3 Austria)	21
Belgian Albums (Ultratop Flanders)	7
Belgian Albums (Ultratop Wallonia)	4
Canadian Albums (Billboard)	2
Danish Albums (Hitlisten)	32
Dutch Albums (Album Top 100)	12
European Albums (Music & Media)	18
Finnish Albums (Suomen virallinen lista)	13
French Albums (SNEP)	9
German Albums (Offizielle Top 100)	20
Greek Foreign Albums (IFPI)	1
Hungarian Albums (MAHASZ)	86
Italian Albums (FIMI)	30
Portuguese Albums (AFP)	12
Quebec (ADISQ)	1
Scottish Albums (OCC)	19
South African Albums (RISA)	18
South Korean International Albums (Circle)	75
Spanish Albums (PROMUSICAE)	58
Swiss Albums (Schweizer Hitparade)	13
UK Albums (OCC)	22
US Billboard 200	10

== Certifications and sales ==
Certifications
Region	Certification	Certified units/sales
Greece (IFPI Greece)	Gold	10,000^{^}
United Kingdom (BPI)	Silver	60,000^{^}
United States (RIAA)	Gold	530,000
^{^} Shipments figures based on certification alone.

== Release history ==
Release history
Region	Date	Label	Format	Catalog
Europe	14 June 2004	Columbia	CD	5152252; 5152256 (French edition)
Europe	14 June 2004	Columbia	CD/DVD	5152253; 5152258 (French edition)
Canada	15 June 2004	Columbia	CD	5152252
Canada	15 June 2004	Columbia	CD/DVD	5152253
United States	15 June 2004	Epic	CD	5152252
United States	15 June 2004	Epic	CD/DVD	92680
Australia	9 July 2004	Epic	CD	5152252
Australia	9 July 2004	Epic	CD/DVD	5152253
Japan	22 December 2004	SMEJ	CD/DVD	EICP-463
