= 1 fille & 4 types =

Studio album by Celine Dion
- Released: 13 October 2003
- Recorded: 2–11 May 2003
- Studio: Digital Insight (Las Vegas)
- Genre: Pop; country pop; folk
- Length: 46:40
- Language: French
- Label: Columbia; Epic
- Producer: Erick Benzi

Celine Dion chronology
| One Heart (2003) | 1 fille & 4 types (2003) | A New Day... Live in Las Vegas (2004) |

Singles from 1 fille & 4 types
- 1. "Tout l'or des hommes" Released: 6 October 2003; 2. "Et je t'aime encore" Released: 16 February 2004

1 fille & 4 types (lit. '1 girl & 4 guys') is the twentieth studio album and twelfth French-language album by Canadian singer Celine Dion. It was released on 13 October 2003 by Columbia Records and Epic Records. It contains 13 songs written and arranged by Jean-Jacques Goldman, Erick Benzi, Jacques Veneruso, and Gildas Arzel, and produced by Benzi. The lead single, "Tout l'or des hommes", reached the top ten in several Francophone markets, including number one in Quebec and number three in France. It was followed by "Et je t'aime encore" and the promotional single "Contre nature".

1 fille & 4 types received favourable reviews from music critics, some of whom described it as a long-awaited release for many Dion fans. It was also commercially successful, topping the charts in Canada, France, Belgium's Wallonia, and Greece, and reaching the top ten in Switzerland, Poland, Finland, and Belgium's Flanders. The album was certified double platinum in France, platinum in Canada, Belgium, and Switzerland, and gold in Finland.

== Background ==
Dion began working on her next French-language album on 8 October 2002 in Paris, where she met with four established French songwriters and producers: Jean-Jacques Goldman, Erick Benzi, Jacques Veneruso, and Gildas Arzel. After four days of rehearsals, she reunited with them in Las Vegas in May 2003 during a break from performing in her residency show A New Day.... Recording sessions took place between 2 and 11 May 2003.

On 11 August 2003, Dion's official website announced that her new French album, titled 1 fille & 4 types (meaning "1 girl & 4 guys"), would be released on 13 October in Europe and 14 October in Canada. Dion collaborated exclusively with Goldman, Benzi, Veneruso, and Arzel on the project. Goldman, who had written and produced the best-selling French-language albums of all time, D'eux and S'il suffisait d'aimer, served as artistic director for 1 fille & 4 types.

The first single, "Tout l'or des hommes", was sent to radio on 27 August 2003. It was written by Veneruso, who had also penned Dion's 2001 number-one hit "Sous le vent", a duet with Garou. The music video was distributed to video outlets in September 2003, and the CD single was scheduled for release on 6 October 2003 in France, Switzerland, and Belgium; on 7 October in Canada; and a few weeks later in Germany. Behind-the-scenes footage from the video for "Tout l'or des hommes" and material documenting the making of the album was posted in the video section on celinedion.com on 28 September.

1 fille & 4 types was also scheduled for release in the United States on 11 November, in Japan on 17 December, in Sweden on 9 February 2004, and in Spain on 19 April.

== Content ==
On 14 September 2003, the album's track listing was posted on Dion's website. On 23 September, it was announced that 1 fille & 4 types would be issued in three different editions. The standard edition was available from all retailers, while a deluxe edition with special photos and a DVD was released in Europe and sold exclusively in Archambault stores in Canada. A limited edition containing a 45-page booklet was made available in France through Carrefour stores.

After the album's release, it was revealed that it included a hidden track, "Valse adieu". The songs were written and arranged by Goldman, Benzi, Veneruso, and Arzel, and produced by Benzi. Goldman's brother, J Kapler, co-wrote "Et je t'aime encore" and wrote "Valse adieu". Goldman, Benzi, Veneruso, and Arzel also contributed instruments and performed lead and background vocals on the record.

1 fille & 4 types includes three cover songs: "Retiens-moi", originally recorded by Nanette Workman for her 1996 album, Une à une; "Tu nages", first recorded by Anggun for her 2000 album, Désirs contraires; and "Rien n'est vraiment fini", recorded by Leyla Doriane for her 2000 album, Libre. "Et je t'aime encore" is the French-language version of "Je t'aime encore", which appeared on Dion's One Heart in March 2003.

== Singles ==
The first single, "Tout l'or des hommes", was released on 6 October 2003 and reached number one in Quebec, number two in Canada, number three in France, number five in Belgium's Wallonia, and number ten in Switzerland; it was certified gold in France.

The second single, "Et je t'aime encore", was sent to radio on 11 December 2003, and the limited-edition CD single was released on 23 February 2004; the music video premiered on 8 March. "Et je t'aime encore" reached number two in Quebec, number 14 in Wallonia, number 16 in France, and number 31 in Switzerland.

The cover art for the next promotional-only single, "Contre nature", was released to TeamCeline members on 6 March 2004. The song was sent to radio in France on 18 March and in Canada on 12 April. The music video, directed by Didier Kerbrat in Las Vegas, premiered on 30 April. The song reached number two in Quebec. "Je lui dirai" was later included on Dion's next album, Miracle, and released as a promotional single in October 2004.

== Promotion ==
To promote the album, Dion taped a television special at the Colosseum at Caesars Palace in Las Vegas on 1 October 2003. Footage from this event was used to create two television specials, one for Canada and another for France. The Canadian special, titled 1 fille & 4 types à Las Vegas, featured an interview with Julie Snyder and short performance clips from the Colosseum at Caesars Palace. Songs included "Le loup, la biche et le chevalier (une chanson douce)" (duet with Henri Salvador), "Je lui dirai", "Apprends-moi", "Mon homme", "Quand on n'a que l'amour" (duet with the winner of Star Académie), "Sous le vent", "Contre nature", "Toi et moi" (duet with Charles Aznavour), "Tout l'or des hommes", "Et je t'aime encore", "Ne bouge pas", and "Le vol d'un ange". The program aired on 19 October 2003 on TVA and drew 1,536,500 viewers, making it the most-watched broadcast in Quebec that day.

The French special, titled Céline!, was hosted by Flavie Flament and included full performances of "Tout l'or des hommes" (with the "4 guys"), "On ne change pas", "Toi et moi" (with Charles Aznavour), "Et je t'aime encore", "Pour que tu m'aimes encore" (duet with Florent Pagny), "Le vol d'un ange", "Apprends-moi" (with the "4 guys"), "Le loup, la biche et le chevalier (une chanson douce)" (with Henri Salvador), "Sous le vent" (with Garou), "S'il suffisait d'aimer" (with Patrick Fiori, Florent Pagny, and Roch Voisine), and "Valse adieu" (with the "4 guys"). The show also included solo performances by Roch Voisine, Garou, Florent Pagny, Patrick Fiori, Michael Jones, Jean-Jacques Goldman, Charles Aznavour, Gérard Darmon, Martin Fontaine, Henri Salvador, and Ricky Martin. It aired on 18 November 2003 on TF1 and became the most-watched program of the French prime-time schedule, attracting 6,131,800 viewers and a 31.1% audience share.

== Critical reception ==
Professional ratings
Review scores
| Source | Rating |
|---|---|
| AllMusic | 4/5 stars |
| Amazon.com | 4.8/5 stars |
| Entertainment Weekly | C |
| Grammy.com | positive |

The album received favourable reviews from music critics. A reviewer from the Montreal Gazette described it as the "most sympathetic and intimate work of her career". The French newspaper Le Parisien rated it as excellent, and the Swiss newspaper Le Matin wrote, "It's solid Dion, square and effectively devilish".

Rob Theakston of AllMusic stated that 1 fille & 4 types "is a record that many Dion fans were hoping would arrive one day. Her voice values dynamics over acrobatics, and the band is stripped down to its bare essentials, taking Dion into relatively unfamiliar territories such as country-pop and folk, and she proves herself more than up to the task of delivering top-notch performances every time. This stripped-down, back-to-basics attitude is only further reinforced within the album's packaging: Dion in several fashionably rugged poses that could have come straight from an Abercrombie & Fitch catalog, complete with photos of a rugged life 'on the road', including a shot of her with the band all lying on a bed together with her hair up in a towel and the air conditioner apparently not working during the summertime. It's completely premeditated and no diva in her right mind would stand for such living conditions, but this only reinforces how far away Dion wants to distance herself from her image this time around. The pop songs are equally as infectious as they are hummable".

Entertainment Weekly editor David Browne wrote a mixed review, noting that "The presentation cries out 'empress of overkill goes alt-rock', but the truth is much less engaging" and adding that the album "does stand as a marked departure from her usual fare. Forsaking orchestras and pop gloss, she and her 'guys' offer up reverby twang in 'Tout l'or des hommes', a slide-guitar romp in 'Ne bouge pas', and enough mopey, semi-unplugged arrangements to make you think they just discovered Bruce Springsteen's 'Tunnel of Love'. For her part, Dion sounds more restrained than on her English-language extravaganzas. The album falls victim to the same bathetic love songs that cripple every Dion project, and the quasi-adventurous production gives way to drippy folk-pop balladry".

== Commercial performance ==
With the release of 1 fille & 4 types, Dion returned to the top of the Canadian charts for the second time in less than seven months. The album achieved this with first-week sales of 44,532 copies, including 42,500 units sold in Quebec alone. It became her sixth number-one album in the SoundScan era and her fourth to debut at the top. Her previous record, One Heart, had entered the chart at number one in April 2003, with sales of 97,000 copies. 1 fille & 4 types remained at number one in its second week, selling 19,300 units. In the third week, it fell to number seven, with sales of 8,300 copies. The album sold over 100,000 units in Canada in 2003. It also debuted at number one in Quebec, where it stayed for three weeks. The album was certified platinum in Canada.

In France, 1 fille & 4 types debuted at number one, with sales of 123,600 copies, and remained at the top for four non-consecutive weeks. On 18 December 2003, it was certified double platinum for shipments of 600,000 copies and became the fifth best-selling album of the year. It has sold over 750,000 copies in France. 1 fille & 4 types also reached number one in Belgium's Wallonia for two consecutive weeks and peaked at number one in Greece, number two in Switzerland, number seven in Poland, number nine in Belgium's Flanders, Finland, and on the European Top 100 Albums. It was certified platinum in Belgium and Switzerland, and gold in Finland.

== Accolades ==
In December 2003, 1 fille & 4 types was nominated for the NRJ Music Award in the Best French-Language Album of the Year category. In February 2004, Dion received four nominations at the Juno Awards, including Francophone Album of the Year, Artist of the Year, and the Fan Choice Award. In September 2004, she received three nominations at the Félix Awards, including Best-Selling Album of the Year and Female Artist of the Year.

== Track listing ==
All tracks were produced by Erick Benzi.

| No. | Title | Writer(s) | Length |
|---|---|---|---|
| 1. | "Tout l'or des hommes" | Jacques Veneruso | 2:58 |
| 2. | "Apprends-moi" | Benzi | 4:44 |
| 3. | "Le vol d'un ange" | Veneruso | 3:38 |
| 4. | "Ne bouge pas" | Gildas Arzel | 4:23 |
| 5. | "Tu nages" | Benzi; Anggun | 3:09 |
| 6. | "Et je t'aime encore" | Jean-Jacques Goldman; J. Kapler | 3:26 |
| 7. | "Retiens-moi" | Benzi | 4:02 |
| 8. | "Je lui dirai" | Goldman | 3:57 |
| 9. | "Mon homme" | Benzi | 3:20 |
| 10. | "Rien n'est vraiment fini" | Veneruso | 3:49 |
| 11. | "Contre nature" | Veneruso | 4:09 |
| 12. | "Des milliers de baisers" | Goldman | 3:46 |
| 13. | "Valse adieu" (hidden track) | Kapler | 1:19 |
| Total length: | | | 46:40 |

=== Notes ===
- The limited edition includes a bonus DVD with the documentary De Paris à Vegas... L'histoire and the music videos for "Tout l'or des hommes" and "Valse adieu".

== Personnel ==
- Gildas Arzel – arranger, guitars, harmonica, lead vocal, background vocals
- Christophe Battaglia – arranger
- Erick Benzi – producer, arranger, engineering, programming, synthesizers, lead vocal, background vocals
- Yvan Cassar – strings director, arranger
- Laurent Coppola – drums
- Humberto Gatica – engineering, mixing
- Jean-Jacques Goldman – artistic director, arranger, guitars, lead vocal, background vocals
- Patrick Hampartzoumian – arranger, programming, synthesizers
- Yannick Hardouin – bass
- Thomas Ivaldy – assistant engineer
- Steve Kadison – assistant engineer
- Dimitri Kurts – assistant engineer
- François Lalonde – assistant engineer
- Gildas Lointier – engineering
- Vito Luprano – executive producer
- Vlado Meller – mastering
- Nicolas Mingot – guitars
- Simon Rhodes – engineering
- Bruno Le Rouzic – flutes, uilleann pipes
- Jacques Veneruso – arranger, guitars, lead vocal, background vocals

== Charts ==
=== Weekly charts ===
Weekly chart performance
| Chart (2003–2004) | Peak position |
|---|---|
| Austrian Albums (Ö3 Austria) | 27 |
| Belgian Albums (Ultratop Flanders) | 9 |
| Belgian Albums (Ultratop Wallonia) | 1 |
| Canadian Albums (Billboard) | 1 |
| Dutch Albums (Album Top 100) | 30 |
| European Albums (Music & Media) | 9 |
| Finnish Albums (Suomen virallinen lista) | 9 |
| French Albums (SNEP) | 1 |
| German Albums (Offizielle Top 100) | 26 |
| Greek Foreign Albums (IFPI) | 1 |
| Hungarian Albums (MAHASZ) | 63 |
| Italian Albums (FIMI) | 52 |
| Polish Albums (ZPAV) | 7 |
| Quebec (ADISQ) | 1 |
| Swedish Albums (Sverigetopplistan) | 22 |
| Swiss Albums (Schweizer Hitparade) | 2 |

=== Year-end charts ===
2003 year-end chart performance
| Chart (2003) | Position |
|---|---|
| Belgian Albums (Ultratop Wallonia) | 12 |
| Belgian Francophone Albums (Ultratop Wallonia) | 8 |
| Finnish Foreign Albums (Suomen virallinen lista) | 15 |
| French Albums (SNEP) | 5 |
| Swiss Albums (Schweizer Hitparade) | 12 |

2004 year-end chart performance
| Chart (2004) | Position |
|---|---|
| Belgian Albums (Ultratop Wallonia) | 86 |
| Belgian Francophone Albums (Ultratop Wallonia) | 40 |
| French Albums (SNEP) | 85 |

== Certifications and sales ==
Certifications
| Region | Certification | Certified units/sales |
|---|---|---|
| Belgium (BRMA) | Platinum | 50,000^{*} |
| Canada (Music Canada) | Platinum | 100,000^{‡} |
| Finland (Musiikkituottajat) | Gold | 16,918 |
| France (SNEP) | 2× Platinum | 750,000 |
| Switzerland (IFPI Switzerland) | Platinum | 40,000^{^} |
| United States | — | 26,000 |
^{*} Sales figures based on certification alone.^{^} Shipments figures based on certification alone.^{‡} Sales+streaming figures based on certification alone.

== Release history ==
Release history
| Region | Date | Label | Format | Catalog |
|---|---|---|---|---|
| Europe | 13 October 2003 | Columbia | CD; cassette | 513481 2; 513481 4 |
| Europe | 13 October 2003 | Columbia | CD/DVD | 513481 5 |
| Canada | 14 October 2003 | Columbia | CD | CK 80984 |
| Canada | 14 October 2003 | Columbia | CD/DVD | 513481 5 |
| United States | 11 November 2003 | Epic | CD | EK 90755 |
| Australia | 14 November 2003 | Epic | CD | 513481 2 |
| Japan | 17 December 2003 | SMEJ | CD | EICP-321 |
| Worldwide | 1 September 2017 | Columbia | LP | 8 89854 50261 4 |

== See also ==
- List of number-one albums of 2003 (Canada)
- List of number-one singles of 2003 (France)
