= Je lui dirai =

Promotional single by Celine Dion

from the album Miracle
- Language: French
- Released: October 2004
- Recorded: 2–11 May 2003
- Studio: Digital Insight (Las Vegas)
- Genre: Pop
- Length: 3:57
- Label: Columbia
- Songwriter: Jean-Jacques Goldman
- Producer: Erick Benzi

Audio
- "Je lui dirai" on YouTube

"Je lui dirai" (lit. 'I will tell him') is a song by Canadian singer Celine Dion from her twentieth studio album, 1 fille & 4 types (2003). Written by Jean-Jacques Goldman and produced by Erick Benzi, the track was later added to the French and Belgian editions of Miracle in October 2004 and issued as a promotional single in both territories. It entered the airplay chart in Belgium's Wallonia, where it reached number 22. A music video showing the making of the Miracle: A Celebration of New Life book was also released.

== Background and release ==
Dion began work on her next French‑language album on 8 October 2002 in Paris, where she met with four French songwriters and producers: Jean-Jacques Goldman, Erick Benzi, Jacques Veneruso and Gildas Arzel. After four days of rehearsals, she reunited with them in Las Vegas in May 2003 during a break from performing in A New Day.... Recording sessions for 1 fille & 4 types took place between 2 and 11 May 2003.

Goldman, who wrote and produced Dion's best‑selling French‑language album D'eux, served as artistic director for 1 fille & 4 types. "Je lui dirai", written by Goldman and produced by Benzi, was included on the album upon its release in October 2003.

One year later, the song was added to the French and Belgian editions of Miracle and issued as a promotional single. In 2005, it was also included on Dion's greatest hits compilation On ne change pas.

== Commercial performance ==
"Je lui dirai" peaked at number 22 on the Ultratop airplay chart in Belgium's Wallonia on 28 December 2004. It remained inside the top 50 for 14 weeks.

== Music video ==
The music video was directed by Scott Lochmus and released in October 2004. It documents the photoshoot for the Miracle: A Celebration of New Life book.

== Charts ==
Chart performance
Chart (2004)	Peak position
Belgium (Ultratop Airplay Wallonia)	22
