= One Heart (Celine Dion song) =

Single by Celine Dion

from the album One Heart
- B-side: "One Heart" (Original 3 pop edit)
- Released: 26 May 2003
- Recorded: 2002
- Studio: Henson (Los Angeles); Digital Insight (Los Angeles)
- Genre: Dance-pop
- Length: 3:24
- Label: Columbia; Epic
- Songwriters: John Shanks; Kara DioGuardi
- Producers: John Shanks; Kara DioGuardi

Celine Dion singles chronology
"I Drove All Night" (2003)	"One Heart" (2003)	"Tout l'or des hommes" (2003)

Music video
- "One Heart" on YouTube

"One Heart" is a song recorded by Canadian singer Celine Dion for her eighth English-language studio album, One Heart (2003). Written and produced by John Shanks and Kara DioGuardi, it is a dance-pop track built around an upbeat message about the power of love. It was issued on 26 May 2003 as the second single outside North America, and in Canada it became the third single following "Have You Ever Been in Love". "One Heart" entered the top 40 in several European countries, reaching number 27 in the United Kingdom.

The song drew positive notices from music critics, who described it as catchy and named it one of the strongest selections on the album. The music video for "One Heart", directed by Antti Jokinen, premiered on 30 May 2003. It was included on the UK enhanced double A-side single "One Heart" / "I Drove All Night". A behind-the-scenes segment was later issued on the A New Day... Live in Las Vegas bonus DVD under the title One Year...One Heart. In October 2008, the track was added to the European edition of Dion's My Love: Ultimate Essential Collection greatest hits.

== Background and release ==
On 15 April 2003, it was announced that after the success of "I Drove All Night", two new singles from One Heart were scheduled for radio release. In the United States and Canada, the ballad "Have You Ever Been in Love" was selected as the next single, while in Europe the label opted for the uptempo title track. On 17 June 2003, it was reported that the song was receiving strong airplay internationally, with "One Heart" added to radio playlists across Europe and gaining momentum at Canadian radio. The CD single was issued in Europe around June 2003, including several remixes of the track. The song was released in Japan in October 2003, and in the United Kingdom it appeared on 8 September 2003 as a double A-side single with "I Drove All Night", marking Dion's first double A-side release there.

== Composition ==
"One Heart" (2003)
A 21-second sample of "One Heart".

"One Heart" was composed and produced by John Shanks and Kara Dioguardi. It is an upbeat dance-pop track, shaped by club-oriented house elements. Lyrically, it centers on the power of love and the idea that determination and encouragement can help someone overcome challenges.

The single opens with keyboards that evoke the twinkling sound of a music box. Early in the track, Dion delivers the line "one heart you are following". The verses promote optimism, with lyrics such as "When you're down, you can start again/ Turn around anything you're in/ Love will find a place yeah".

The chorus conveys the idea that trusting one's heart can help maintain focus on personal goals. A bright acoustic guitar and lively drums accompany the bridge. Later in the song, Dion extends several notes with greater intensity before closing softly with the line "love will find a way/love will find a way in your heart".

== Critical reception ==
"One Heart" received generally positive reviews. AllMusic senior editor Stephen Thomas Erlewine described the track as "sunny and catchy" and named it one of the strongest selections on the album. A reviewer for Traveling to the Heart commented on Dion's vocal approach, noting that she is "low-key and mostly melisma-free" and sings in her lower register throughout, which the reviewer felt made her voice "pleasing but bland and mechanical". The same review concluded that "The genial 'One Heart' is well-intentioned advice set to a paint-by-numbers, riskless dance beat". Billboard praised the track, stating that "Dion is particularly strong on the percolating title cut (a vibrant, infectious future hit helmed by Kara DioGuardi and John Shanks)".

== Commercial performance ==
"One Heart" became a top 40 hit in most European countries where it charted. In Austria, it debuted at number 48 on the Ö3 Austria Top 40 on 29 June 2003. It rose to number 27 the following week and reached its peak at number 25 in its fourth week. The song spent six additional weeks inside the top 40 before falling to number 46, and remained on the chart for 14 weeks in total. In Sweden, the song debuted at number 43 on the Swedish Singles Chart on 26 June 2003. It climbed to number 42 in its second week and reached number 40 on 11 July 2003. It then dropped off the chart, returning on 8 August 2003 at number 60. After another brief disappearance, it re-entered on 7 November 2003 at number 34, its peak position, before leaving the chart the following week at number 38.

In France, the song debuted and peaked at number 63 on the SNEP chart. Although it did not rise higher, it fluctuated on the chart for 11 weeks and spent 12 weeks in total inside the top 100. In the United Kingdom, "One Heart" entered the UK Singles Chart at number 27 on 20 September 2003. It fell to number 57 the following week and exited the chart after two consecutive weeks. In Ireland, the song debuted and peaked at number 30 on the Irish Singles Chart for the week ending 11 September 2003. It dropped to number 44 the following week, then fell to number 49 in its third week, leaving the chart after three weeks in total.

== Music video ==
Dion filmed the music video back-to-back with the "Have You Ever Been in Love" video in Los Angeles on 29 and 30 April 2003, working with director Antti Jokinen. On 7 June, "TeamCeline" members received an exclusive preview of the video on her official website. Both videos were released on 22 June 2003.

The video shows Dion dancing and enjoying herself in a club setting, surrounded by people moving to the song. It also includes an appearance by singer Melissa Molinaro, who is shown kissing her boyfriend at the bar.

== Formats and track listing ==
- European CD single
1. "One Heart" (album version) – 3:24
2. "One Heart" (Original 3 pop edit) – 3:20
- European, Australian and Japanese CD maxi-single
1. "One Heart" (album version) – 3:24
2. "One Heart" (Original 3 pop edit) – 3:20
3. "One Heart" (Original 3 rhythmic extended) – 7:08
4. "One Heart" (Original 3 rhythmic edit) – 3:38
- UK CD single #1
1. "One Heart" – 3:24
2. "I Drove All Night" – 4:00
3. "All by Myself" – 5:12
4. "One Heart" (video) – 3:25
- UK CD single #2
1. "One Heart" – 3:24
2. "I Drove All Night" – 4:00
3. "I Drove All Night" (Hex Hector extended vocal import mix) – 7:53
4. "I Drove All Night" (video) – 3:58

== Credits and personnel ==
Recording locations

- Recording – Henson Studios (Los Angeles)
- Digital Insight (Los Angeles)

Personnel

- John Shanks – songwriting, production, mixing, guitars
- Kara DioGuardi – songwriting, production, backing vocals
- Jamie Muhoberad – keyboards
- Chris Chaney – bass
- Jeff Rothschild – mixing

Credits adapted from the liner notes of One Heart, Epic Records.

== Charts ==
=== Weekly charts ===
Weekly chart performance
Chart (2003)	Peak position
Australia (ARIA)	75
Austria (Ö3 Austria Top 40)	25
Belgium (Ultratop 50 Flanders)	37
Belgium (Ultratop 50 Wallonia)	51
Czech Republic (Rádio Top 50)	15
Denmark Airplay (Tracklisten)	13
European Hot 100 Singles (Billboard)	56
European Radio Top 50 (Music & Media)	49
Finland (Suomen virallinen radiosoittolista)	3
France (SNEP)	64
Germany (GfK)	56
Greece (IFPI)	38
Hungary (Editors' Choice Top 40)	31
Ireland (IRMA)	30
Netherlands (Single Top 100)	78
Norway Airplay (VG-lista)	28
Poland (National Airplay Chart)	20
Quebec Radio Songs (ADISQ)	23
Romania (Romanian Top 100)	4
Scotland Singles (Official Charts)	20
Spain Airplay (PROMUSICAE)	2
Sweden (Sverigetopplistan)	34
Switzerland (Schweizer Hitparade)	36
UK Singles (Official Charts)	27

=== Year-end charts ===
Year-end chart performance
Chart (2003)	Position
Romania (Romanian Top 100)	41

== Release history ==
Release history
Region	Date	Format	Label	Ref.
Denmark	26 May 2003	CD	Columbia	
Australia	21 July 2003	CD	Epic	
Japan	20 August 2003	CD	SMEJ	
United Kingdom	8 September 2003	CD	Epic	
