= Have You Ever Been in Love =

"Have You Ever Been in Love" may refer to:

- Have You Ever Been in Love (album), a 1983 album by Leo Sayer, or its title track
- "Have You Ever Been in Love" (song), a 2002 song by Celine Dion
