= Descendants (soundtrack) =

Soundtrack album by Descendants cast
- Released: July 31, 2015
- Genre: Pop
- Length: 39:43
- Label: Walt Disney Records

Singles from Descendants
- 1. "If Only" Released: July 31, 2015; 2. "Rotten to the Core" Released: December 18, 2015

Descendants is a soundtrack album by the cast of the film of the same name, released on July 31, 2015 by Walt Disney Records. The soundtrack peaked at number 1 on the US Billboard 200, number one on the US Top Digital Albums and topped the US Top Soundtracks.

== Background ==
Initially, the film was not envisioned as a musical. It was not until director/choreographer Kenny Ortega came on board that songs were added. The film itself contains seven musical numbers, plus a song by Shawn Mendes during the end credits, which was released as a single. In addition, the soundtrack album includes four bonus tracks as well as a suite of the David Lawrence's orchestral score. Not included on the soundtrack is the Vancouver Children's Choir Choral Society's interpretation of "Laudamus te" from Antonio Vivaldi's Gloria, which was heard at Prince Ben's coronation ceremony and the Overture of the orchestral suite Music for the Royal Fireworks composed by George Handel, which is heard at the entrance of the temple.

== Commercial performance ==
The soundtrack debuted at number one on the Billboard 200 with 42,000 album-equivalent units earned during its first week of release, dethroning R&B singer Jill Scott's Woman. It is the smallest weekly total for a number one album since the chart began ranking albums by equivalent units in December 2014. It is the first Disney Channel Original Movie since High School Musical 2 to have a soundtrack hit number one on the Billboard 200.

== Singles ==
"If Only", performed by Dove Cameron, was released as single on July 31, 2015. The song was written by Adam Anders, Nikki Hassman and Peer Astrom. It debuted at number 99 in the Billboard Hot 100 and peaked at 94. The second version of "Rotten to the Core", (written by Shelly Peiken, Joacim Persson and Johann Alkenas) and performed by Sofia Carson was released as second single on December 18. The decision to release the song was made to promote the animated short-form series Descendants: Wicked World, for which Carson's version is the opening theme. The song did not enter the Billboard Hot 100, but peaked at number five on the Bubbling Under Hot 100 Singles chart.

=== Promotional singles ===
"Believe", performed by Shawn Mendes, was released as promotional single on June 26, 2015. The song received a nomination for Choice Music: Song from a Movie at the 2015 Teen Choice Awards.

=== Other charted songs ===
The original version of "Rotten to the Core", performed by Dove Cameron, Cameron Boyce, Booboo Stewart and Sofia Carson, debuted at number 38 on the US Billboard Hot 100. "Did I Mention", performed by Mitchell Hope and Jeff Lewis, peaked at number 2 on the Billboard Bubbling Under Hot 100 Singles chart. "Evil Like Me", performed by Kristin Chenoweth and Dove Cameron, debuted at number 14 and peaked at number 12 on the Billboard Bubbling Under Hot 100 Singles chart. "Set It Off", performed by Dove Cameron, Sofia Carson, Cameron Boyce, Booboo Stewart, Mitchell Hope, Sarah Jeffery and Jeff Lewis, debuted at number 17 and peaked at number 11 on the Billboard Bubbling Under Hot 100 Singles chart.

== Accolades ==
| Year | Award | Category | Recipients and nominees | Result | Ref. |
|---|---|---|---|---|---|
| 2015 | Teen Choice Awards | Choice Movie TV Song | "Believe" by Shawn Mendes | Nominated | |

== Track listing ==
| No. | Title | Writer(s) | Artist(s) | Length |
|---|---|---|---|---|
| 1. | "Rotten to the Core" | Joacim Persson; Shelly Peiken; Johan Alkenäs | Dove Cameron; Cameron Boyce; Booboo Stewart; Sofia Carson | 2:42 |
| 2. | "Evil Like Me" | Andrew Lippa | Kristin Chenoweth; Dove Cameron | 3:44 |
| 3. | "Did I Mention" | Adam Schlesinger | Mitchell Hope; Jeff Lewis | 2:33 |
| 4. | "If Only" | Adam Anders; Nikki Hassman; Peer Åström | Dove Cameron | 3:49 |
| 5. | "Be Our Guest" | Alan Menken; Howard Ashman | Mitchell Hope; Spencer Lee; Kala Balch; Marco Marinangeli | 1:55 |
| 6. | "If Only (Reprise)" | Anders; Hassman; Åström | Dove Cameron | 0:41 |
| 7. | "Set it Off" | Sam Hollander; Josh Edmondson; Grant Michaels; Craig Lashley; Charity Daw | Dove Cameron; Sofia Carson; Cameron Boyce; Booboo Stewart; Mitchell Hope; Sarah Jeffery; Jeff Lewis | 2:54 |
| 8. | "Believe" | Shawn Mendes; Geoffrey Warburton; Glen Scott; Martin Terefe | Shawn Mendes | 3:28 |
| 9. | "Rotten to the Core" (single version) | Persson; Peiken; Alkenas | Sofia Carson | 2:54 |
| 10. | "Night Is Young" (from Descendants: Wicked World) | Augie Ray; Jintae Ko; Lindy Robbins | China Anne McClain | 3:02 |
| 11. | "Good Is the New Bad" (from Descendants: Wicked World) | Aris Archontis; Chen Neeman; Jeannie Lurie | Dove Cameron; Sofia Carson; China Anne McClain | 2:34 |
| 12. | "I'm Your Girl" (from Descendants: Wicked World) | Dustin Burnett; Stephanie Lewis; Paula Winger | Felicia Barton | 2:38 |
| 13. | "Descendants Score Suite" | David Lawrence | David Lawrence | 6:49 |
| Total length: | | | | 39:43 |

Japanese bonus tracks – karaoke instrumentals
| No. | Title | Writer(s) | Length |
|---|---|---|---|
| 14. | "Rotten to the Core" | Persson; Peiken; Alkenäs | 2:42 |
| 15. | "Evil Like Me" | Lippa | 3:44 |
| 16. | "Did I Mention" | Schlesinger | 2:33 |
| 17. | "If Only" | Anders; Hassman; Åström | 3:49 |
| 18. | "Set it Off" | Hollander; Edmondson; Michaels; Lashley; Daw | 2:54 |

== Charts ==
=== Weekly charts ===
| Chart (2015) | Peak position |
|---|---|
| Australian Albums (ARIA) | 57 |
| Belgian Albums (Ultratop Flanders) | 179 |
| Belgian Albums (Ultratop Wallonia) | 177 |
| Dutch Albums (Album Top 100) | 50 |
| French Albums (SNEP) | 102 |
| Italian Compilation Albums (FIMI) | 19 |
| Spanish Albums (Promusicae) (Los descendientes) | 36 |
| UK Soundtrack Albums (OCC) | 2 |
| US Billboard 200 | 1 |
| US Kid Albums (Billboard) | 1 |
| US Digital Albums (Billboard) | 2 |
| US Soundtrack Albums (Billboard) | 1 |

=== Year-end charts ===
| Chart (2015) | Position |
|---|---|
| US Billboard 200 | 153 |
| US Soundtrack Albums (Billboard) | 11 |

== Certifications ==
| Region | Certification | Certified units/sales |
|---|---|---|
| United Kingdom (BPI) | Silver | 60,000^{‡} |
| United States (RIAA) | Gold | 500,000^{‡} |
^{‡} Sales+streaming figures based on certification alone.
