= Faith (Celine Dion song) =

Promotional single by Celine Dion

from the album One Heart
- Released: 4 October 2003
- Recorded: 2003
- Studio: Echo Beach (Florida)
- Genre: Pop
- Length: 3:42 (album version); 3:42 (Original 3 remix)
- Label: Columbia
- Songwriters: Max Martin; Rami
- Producers: Max Martin; Rami

Audio
- "Faith" on YouTube

"Faith" is a song recorded by Canadian singer Celine Dion for her eighth English‑language studio album, One Heart (2003). Released on 4 October 2003 as the third promotional single in Canada and the fifth single overall from the album, it was written and produced by Max Martin and Rami Yacoub. The track was serviced to radio in both its album version and a remix by the Original 3, who had previously remixed "One Heart". "Faith" reached number four on the Quebec radio chart.

== Background and release ==
"Faith" was written and produced by Max Martin and Rami Yacoub. Martin had previously written Dion's 1999 hit "That's the Way It Is". The song was recorded and mixed by Martin and Yacoub at Echo Beach Studios in Florida. Lyrically, it describes a relationship in which the narrator expresses gratitude for unconditional love.

On 4 October 2003, the track was selected for airplay on Canadian Hot AC and CHR radio formats. On 10 October 2003, a remix by the Original 3 was released through TeamCeline.

== Critical reception ==
Elisabeth Vincentelli of Entertainment Weekly gave the song a positive review, writing that "One Heart's best qualities are encapsulated on 'Faith,' a Martin track that matches a hooky chorus with pneumatic arrangements that cushion the star without overwhelming her. Ultimately, this record is about the singing, not the production or the writing". The Barnes & Noble editorial review also praised the track, describing it as "infectious" and noting that it "benefit[s] from Dion's beautifully subtle vocal interpretation".

== Charts ==
Chart performance
Chart (2003–2004)	Peak position
Quebec Radio Songs (ADISQ)	4

== Credits and personnel ==
Recording locations

- Echo Beach Studios, Florida – recording

Personnel

- Max Martin – songwriting, production, recording, mixing, backing vocals
- Rami Yacoub – songwriting, production, recording, mixing
- Esbjörn Öhrwall – guitars
- Thomas Lindberg – bass
- Anna Nordell – backing vocals

Credits adapted from the liner notes of One Heart.
