= Rock of Ages (2012 soundtrack) =

Rock of Ages: Original Motion Picture Soundtrack

Soundtrack album by Various artists
- Released: June 5, 2012
- Recorded: 2011–2012
- Genre: Classic rock, Soundtrack
- Length: 59:27
- Label: WaterTower Music
- Producer: Adam Anders; Peer Astrom; Adam Shankman; Matt Sullivan

Rock of Ages (Original Motion Picture Soundtrack) is the soundtrack to the 2012 film Rock of Ages based on the rock jukebox Broadway musical of the same name. The soundtrack is a collection of music from 1980s rock artists including Def Leppard, Journey, Scorpions, Poison, Foreigner, Guns N' Roses, Pat Benatar, Joan Jett, Bon Jovi, Twisted Sister, Whitesnake, REO Speedwagon, and others. The songs were performed in the film, by Julianne Hough, Diego Boneta, Russell Brand, Alec Baldwin, Paul Giamatti, Catherine Zeta-Jones, Malin Åkerman, Mary J. Blige and Tom Cruise. The soundtrack was released by WaterTower Music on June 5, 2012 and was commercially successful, becoming the second-best selling soundtrack of the year, behind The Hunger Games: Songs from District 12 and Beyond (2012). It was further nominated for the Best Compilation Soundtrack for Visual Media at the 55th Annual Grammy Awards.

== Background ==
On April 30, 2012, WaterTower Music, the in-house label of the film's presenter, Warner Bros. Pictures had unveiled the song list of over 20 tracks featured in the album, set for June 5, release. The cover art of the album was released through Entertainment Weekly, which featured the cast in its entirety. The soundtrack was made free for streaming at AOL as a part of listening party.

== Reception ==
Jody Rosen of Rolling Stone rated the album 3 out of 5 and said "The film version of the musical is mild kitsch-karaoke fun; the real takeaway is how great the 1980s originals were." Shaun Munro of WhatCulture wrote "Rock of Ages wont be regarded alongside the great musical soundtracks, but just like the film, it knows exactly what it is and entertains accordingly. Singing voices are surprisingly consistent, pushing the stronger ones to the forefront, and keeping the lesser ones "that's you, Giamatti" well back in the wings. Does it give you a reason to put away those old albums? Absolutely not. But for fans, it might be a nice little indulgence."

Arlene R. Weiss of Guitar International wrote "Rock Of Ages is a warmhearted send up of, and ultimately, affectionate homage to, the music and popular culture of the '80s told with wit, style, and much joy. It's wonderfully over the top and overflowing with sparkling musical numbers, eye and ear candy, camp, and lots of cheese. Moreover, just as Stacee, Drew, and Sherrie take the stage and regale us along with their glittering, show stopping rendition of Journey's "Don't Stop Believin'", Rock Of Ages is a heartfelt, sentimental salute to the joyous wonder, pursuit, and realization, of our rock and roll dreams." Stephen Thomas Erlewine of AllMusic wrote "the original soundtrack to Rock of Ages can't help but feel like a faded photocopy, but somebody has taken great care to dress those smeared, blurry images in glitter and highlights, the sparkle deriving from a star-studded cast fronted by Tom Cruise."

== Commercial performance ==
By the week of June 23, 2012, the album debuted at number 15 on Billboard 200 and peaked at the fifth position on that chart in its third week. It also topped the Top Soundtracks chart at its debut and stayed for six consecutive weeks until The Dark Knight Rises soundtrack topped on its debut on August 4, 2012, pushing Rock of Ages to the fifth position. It debuted at number 6 on Top Rock Albums, and peaked to number 2 on the week of July 14, 2012. It further peaked at the Canadian Albums Chart to number 8. It sold 267,000 copies in the United States and became the second best-selling soundtrack album of the year. As of May 2013, the album sold over 320,000 copies. The release of the soundtrack propelled the digital downloads of "Juke Box Hero", a 1981 single by Foreigner, up to 400%, outperforming The Rolling Stones, Eagles, Def Leppard and Fleetwood Mac. Other songs such as "I Want to Know What Love Is" and "Waiting for a Girl Like You" had also seen significant increase in the downloads.

== Track listing ==
| No. | Title | Artist(s) | Length |
|---|---|---|---|
| 1. | "Paradise City" | Tom Cruise | 03:43 |
| 2. | "Sister Christian / Just Like Paradise / Nothin' but a Good Time" | Julianne Hough, Diego Boneta, Russell Brand, Alec Baldwin | 05:41 |
| 3. | "Juke Box Hero / I Love Rock 'n' Roll" | Diego Boneta, Alec Baldwin, Russell Brand, Julianne Hough | 02:23 |
| 4. | "Hit Me With Your Best Shot" | Catherine Zeta-Jones | 02:28 |
| 5. | "Waiting for a Girl Like You" | Diego Boneta, Julianne Hough | 03:24 |
| 6. | "More Than Words / Heaven" | Julianne Hough, Diego Boneta | 03:08 |
| 7. | "Wanted Dead or Alive" | Tom Cruise, Julianne Hough | 04:19 |
| 8. | "I Want to Know What Love Is" | Tom Cruise, Malin Åkerman | 03:32 |
| 9. | "I Wanna Rock" | Diego Boneta | 02:26 |
| 10. | "Pour Some Sugar on Me" | Tom Cruise | 03:13 |
| 11. | "Harden My Heart" | Julianne Hough, Mary J. Blige | 02:40 |
| 12. | "Shadows of the Night / Harden My Heart" | Mary J. Blige, Julianne Hough | 01:57 |
| 13. | "Here I Go Again" | Diego Boneta, Paul Giamatti, Julianne Hough, Mary J. Blige, Tom Cruise | 03:07 |
| 14. | "Can't Fight This Feeling" | Russell Brand, Alec Baldwin | 03:05 |
| 15. | "Any Way You Want It" | Mary J. Blige, Constantine Maroulis, Julianne Hough | 02:31 |
| 16. | "Undercover Love" | Diego Boneta | 03:06 |
| 17. | "Every Rose Has Its Thorn" | Julianne Hough, Diego Boneta, Tom Cruise, Mary J. Blige | 02:57 |
| 18. | "Rock You Like a Hurricane" | Julianne Hough, Tom Cruise | 02:40 |
| 19. | "We Built This City / We're Not Gonna Take It" | Russell Brand, Catherine Zeta-Jones | 02:18 |
| 20. | "Don't Stop Believin'" | Julianne Hough, Diego Boneta, Tom Cruise, Alec Baldwin, Russell Brand, Mary J. Blige | 04:13 |
| Total length: | | | 62:51 |

== Film music not included in the album ==
- "I Remember You" – Skid Row
- "Oh Sherrie" – Steve Perry
- "Everybody Wants Some!!" – Van Halen
- "Rock of Ages" – Def Leppard
- "Bringin' On the Heartbreak" – Def Leppard
- "Talk Dirty to Me" – Poison
- "No One Like You" – Scorpions
- "Cum On Feel the Noize" – Quiet Riot; original song performed by Slade (end credits)
- "Cherry Pie" – Warrant (extended cut)

== Chart performance ==
=== Weekly charts ===
| Chart (2012) | Peak position |
|---|---|
| Australian Albums (ARIA) | 4 |
| Austrian Albums (Ö3 Austria) | 12 |
| Belgian Albums (Ultratop Wallonia) | 99 |
| Canadian Albums (Billboard) | 8 |
| Danish Albums (Hitlisten) | 26 |
| New Zealand Albums (RMNZ) | 4 |
| Spanish Albums (Promusicae) | 37 |
| Swiss Albums (Schweizer Hitparade) | 37 |
| UK Compilation Albums (OCC) | 7 |
| UK Album Downloads (OCC) | 3 |
| UK Soundtrack Albums (OCC) | 1 |
| US Billboard 200 | 5 |
| US Top Rock Albums (Billboard) | 2 |
| US Top Current Album Sales (Billboard) | 7 |
| US Top Soundtracks (Billboard) | 1 |

=== Year-end charts ===
| Chart (2012) | Position |
|---|---|
| US Soundtrack Albums (Billboard) | 5 |

| Chart (2013) | Position |
|---|---|
| US Soundtrack Albums (Billboard) | 8 |

== Certifications ==
| Region | Certification | Certified units/sales |
|---|---|---|
| Australia (ARIA) | Gold | 35,000^{^} |
| Canada (Music Canada) | Gold | 40,000^{^} |
| United Kingdom (BPI) | Gold | 100,000^{‡} |
^{^} Shipments figures based on certification alone.^{‡} Sales+streaming figures based on certification alone.

== Credits ==
Album credits

- Producer – Adam Anders, Adam Shankman, Matt Sullivan, Peer Astrom
- Executive producer – Erin Scully, Jason Linn, Matt Weaver
- Recording – Allen Sides (strings), Bob Clearmountain (drums)
- Mixing – Alan Meyerson, Doug McKean, Mike Shipley, Peer Astrom
- Music editors – Lisa Jaime, Sally Boldt, Brett "Snacky" Pierce
- Digital editing – Adam Anders, Alex Anders, Deyder Cintron, Peer Astrom, Ryan Petersen
- Sound engineer – Alex Anders, Peer Astrom, Deyder Cintron, Fredrik Jansson, Joshua Blanchard
- Arrangement – David Campbell (strings), Adam Anders (vocals)
- Music supervisor – Matt Sullivan
- Technician – Ross Garfield (drum)
- Music Consultant – Janet Billig Rich
- Contractor – Suzie Katayama (strings), Windy Wagner (vocals)
- Music production co-ordinator – Anthony Falcon, Nicole Ray
- Soundtrack co-ordinator – Kim Baum
- Art direction – Sandeep Sriram

Performer credits

- Backing vocalists – Adam Anders, Alex Brown, Alvin Chea, Amy Keys, Angela Michael, Carmen Carter, Chole Leighton, Colin Benward, Danny Wagner, David Loucks, Deyder Cintron, Dorian Holley, Drew Ryan Scott, Edie Lehmann Boddicker, Gigi Worth, JC Chasez, Jimmy Burney, Jeanette Olsson, Jenny Karr, Jon Hall, Juke Edgemon, Julia Tillman, Kala Balch, Kamari Copeland, Kandace Ferrel, Ken Stacey, Matt Sullivan, Maxine Williard Waters, Missi Hale, Nikki Anders, Onitsha Shaw, Oren Waters, Ravaughn Brown, Sean Holt, Shelley Rosenberg, Storm Lee, Terrell Carter, Terry Wood, Tim Davis, Windy Wagner
- Drums – Josh Freese, Peer Astrom
- Bass – Peer Astrom, Adam Anders
- Keyboard – Peer Astrom
- Guitar – Michael Landau, Tim Pierce, Adam Anders (electric and acoustic)
- Piano – Kevin Randolph
- Saxophone – Brandon Fields

Source: AllMusic.
