= Lorada =

Studio album by Johnny Hallyday
- Released: June 20, 1995
- Recorded: France, 1995
- Genre: Pop rock
- Labels: Mercury, Universal Music
- Producer: Erick Benzi

Johnny Hallyday chronology
À La Cigale (1994)	Lorada (1995)	Lorada Tour (1995)

Singles from Lorada
- 1. "J'la croise tous les matins" Released: June 1995; 2. "Ne m'oublie pas" Released: August 1995; 3. "Quand le masque tombe" Released: November 1995; 4. "Rester libre" Released: March 1996

Lorada is a 1995 album recorded by French singer Johnny Hallyday. It was released on June 20, 1995, and achieved success in France and Belgium (Wallonia). It provided four singles in France: "J'la croise tous les matins" (#7), "Ne m'oublie pas" (#18), "Quand le masque tombe" (#22) and "Rester libre" (#26). Several songs of the album were written by Jean-Jacques Goldman, including the first single.

== Track listing ==
1. "Lorada" (Erick Benzi, Gildas Arzel, Jean-Jacques Goldman, Jacques Veneruso) – 0:47
2. "Est-ce que tu me veux encore ?" (Gildas Arzel) – 4:42
3. "Rester libre" (Erick Benzi, Canada) – 4:01
4. "Le Regard des autres" (Jean-Jacques Goldman) – 5:10
5. "Lady Lucille" (Gildas Arzel) – 4:02
6. "Un rêve à faire" (Gildas Arzel) – 4:39
7. "J'la croise tous les matins" (Jean-Jacques Goldman) – 4:31
8. "Chercher les anges" (Jacques Veneruso) – 6:26
9. "Tout feu, toute femme" (Jacques Veneruso) – 4:29
10. "Quand le masque tombe" (Erick Benzi) – 4:41
11. "Ami" (Erick Benzi) – 3:44
12. "Aime-moi" (Erick Benzi) – 4:20
13. "Ne m'oublie pas" (Jacques Veneruso, Gildas Arzel, Erick Benzi, Gwenael Arzel) – 4:44

== Personnel ==
Musicians

- Ian Wallace - drums (tracks 2,3,5-11,13)
- Phil Soussan - bass (tracks 2,3,5-11,13)
- Jim Prime - organ (tracks 2–5,7-11,13)
- Erick Benzi - keyboards (tracks 2–8,10-13)
- Erick Benzi (tracks 2,3,7,10), Marc Chantereau (tracks 4,13) - percussion
- Robin Le Mesurier (tracks 2–4,7-13), Gildas Arzel (tracks 4,6) - slide guitar
- Gildas Arzel (track 2,3,5,7,10,11), Jacques Veneruso (tracks 8,9,13) - electric guitar
- Jacques Veneruso (track 2–4,6,7,10-12), Robin Le Mesurier (track 5), Gildas Arzel (tracks 9,12,13), Jean-Jacques Goldman (track 12) - acoustic guitar
- Christophe Duplu - harmonica (track 2,4,9,13)
- Jim Prime (tracks 5,6), Erick Benzi (track 5) - piano
- Erick Benzi - tambourine (track 11)
- Erick Benzi (tracks 1–3,5,8-13), Jacques Veneruso (tracks 1–3,5,6,8-13), Gildas Arzel (tracks 1,2,5,6,8-13), Jean-Jacques Goldman (tracks 1,2,8-10,12,13) - backing vocals

Recording

- Artistic production : Jean-Jacques Goldman
- Arrangements and production : Erick Benzi
- Recorded at Lorada and at Guillaume Tell, by Erick Benzi
- Mixed at Guillaume Tell by Chris Kimsey for Chris Kimsey Production
  - Except tracks 7,10 : mixed by Erick Benzi
- Assistants :
  - At Lorada : Antonio Martinez
  - At Guillaume Tell : Myriam Eddaira, Stéphane Briand and Jérôme Devoise
- Technical team at Lorada : Guy Marseguerra, Guy Laroutis and Luc Vindras
- Engraving : Raphaël Jonin / Dyam
- Photos : Roberto Frankenberg, Gilles LHOTE / OREP and Tony Frank
- Design : Antonietti, Pascault

== Releases ==
Date	Label	Country	Format	Catalog
1995	Universal Music	Belgium, France, Switzerland	CD	5283692

== Certifications and sales ==
Country	Certification	Date	Sales certified
France	2 x Platinum	1995	600,000

== Charts ==
=== Weekly charts ===
Chart (1995–1996)	Peak position
Belgian (Wallonia) Albums Chart	3
French SNEP Albums Chart	2

=== Year-end charts ===
Chart (1995)	Position
Belgian (Wallonia) Albums Chart	18
French Albums Chart	9
