= Rotten to the Core (song) =

2015 song from Descendants

Song by Dove Cameron, Cameron Boyce, Booboo Stewart and Sofia Carson

from the album Descendants
- Recorded: 2015
- Genre: Dance-pop
- Length: 2:42
- Label: Walt Disney
- Songwriters: Joacim Persson; Shelly Peiken; Johan Alkenäs
- Producer: Twin

"Rotten to the Core" is a song from Disney Channel's 2015 television film Descendants, whose music and lyrics were composed by Joacim Persson, Shelly Peiken and Johann Alkenas. The song was performed in its original show-tune version in the film by the main cast – Dove Cameron, Cameron Boyce, Booboo Stewart and Sofia Carson – in their vocal roles as Mal (daughter of Maleficent), Carlos (son of Cruella de Vil), Jay (son of Jafar) and Evie (daughter of The Evil Queen). The song peaked at number 38 in the Billboard Hot 100. A second version, performed by actress and singer Sofia Carson, was released as a single on December 18, 2015. For the release of the third movie, the song was remixed.

== Background and composition ==
"Rotten to the Core" (2015)
A 23 second sample of "Rotten to the Core".

A midtempo dance-pop song, "Rotten to the Core" exhibits elements of pop, dubstep and hip hop. Built on a beat, multi-tracked harmonies, the song's instrumentation includes slow-bouncing synthesizer tones and keyboard. The song was written by Joacim Persson, Shelly Peiken and Johann Alkenas and produced by the duo Twin. Cameron's vocals span from the low note of F_{3} and Carson's vocals span from the high notes of F_{5}. The song introduces the four villainous offspring in the film. Gary Wright of Rotoscopes noted that part of the song is spoken, whispered, reflecting an ominous tone to the voices, while only the chorus is sung. Lyrically, the song talks about the feelings of the villains, who are evil and wicked, but they like to be just like this ("Who's the baddest of them all? / Welcome to my wicked world, wicked world"). The stanzas and chorus are sung also among the four artists, while the pre-chorus is only performed by Cameron and Carson.

== Critical reception ==
The song has received mixed reviews from music critics. KidsWorld Magazine believed that "Rotten to the Core" was the best song on the album. Chuck Campbell of Knoxville News Sentinel described the song as "surprisingly bold". Daynah of Disney Geek commented that the song had an addictive melody with good sound effects.

Marshal Knight of Laughing Place was more negative, describing "Rotten to the Core" as "disjointed" and the worst song created for a Disney Channel Original Movie, analyzing that Booboo Stewart "saying the same phrase over and over with a rasp that wasn't necessary". Gary Wright of Rotoscopes said that the song is a "ridiculously cheesy song" that "fails to hit the right notes," believing that it "[made] the movie so bland and forgettable". Common Sense Media believed that the song should not be introduced for children under 6 years, stating that the movie scene where the song is featured has Evie "[drawing] one boy in to kiss her in a very seductive scene and wants to land a prince with money and a big castle". Ryan Clavin of WDW Info said that the song was "meh" and "a bit too on the nose," which he found to be the case with many other songs from Disney Channel Original Movies.

== Charts ==
Chart (2015)	Peak position
Canada (Canadian Hot 100)	66
US Billboard Hot 100	38
US Kid Digital Songs (Billboard)	1

== Certifications ==
Region	Certification	Certified units/sales
United Kingdom (BPI)	Silver	200,000^{‡}
United States (RIAA)	Platinum	1,000,000^{‡}
^{‡} Sales+streaming figures based on certification alone.

== Single version ==
"Rotten to the Core"
- Spanish/English version cover

Single by Sofia Carson

from the album Descendants (Original TV Movie Soundtrack)
- Released: December 18, 2015
- Recorded: 2015
- Genre: Pop; ska; dance-pop
- Length: 2:55
- Label: Walt Disney
- Songwriters: Joacim Persson; Shelly Peiken; Johann Alkenas
- Producer: Twin

Descendants singles chronology
"If Only" (2015)	"Rotten to the Core" (2015)	"Ways to Be Wicked" (2017)

A second version of "Rotten to the Core", performed by Sofia Carson (who portrays Evie in the film), was released as single on December 18, 2015 by Walt Disney Records. The decision to release the song was made to promote the animated short-form series Descendants: Wicked World, of which Carson's version is the opening theme. The song was included in the soundtrack to the Disney Channel Original Movie Descendants (2015).

=== Chart performance ===
On December 12, 2015, "Rotten to the Core" peaked at number one on the Billboard Kid Digital Songs. The song did not enter the Billboard Hot 100, but peaked at number five on the Bubbling Under Hot 100 Singles chart.

=== Live performances ===
"Rotten to the Core" (single version) (2015)
A 21 second sample to second version of "Rotten to the Core".

On August 17, 2015, Carson performed the song at D23 Expo and short a cappella version during a MTV interview, on September 27. On November 26, she performed "Rotten to the Core" at Macy's Thanksgiving Day Parade. The song was performed at American Spanish-language show El Gordo y la Flaca on December 9. She also sang a Latin remix at Feliz!, a New Year's Eve special on Univision, on December 31.

=== Music video ===
The official music video for the song directed by British directors Naren Wilks and Adam Santelli. It was recorded on July and premiered on Disney Channel on August 23, 2015 after Best Friends Whenever. The video uses a 3D green screen cylinder, an illusionary technique that capturing a kaleidoscope-like effect onscreen. The video begins with Carson dressed as a princess in an explosion of fireworks, when she picks up the mirror of the Evil Queen and recites: "Mirror, mirror in the night, show a girl a little light". A trail of light transports her to a black-and-white scene, where she begins to sing while it multiplies. In another scene, Carson sings to six mirrors, where each reflects her dancing different from the others. In a third scene, she sings alone on a purple background with lights. Various effects for the video and multiply Carson. In the end, she leaves the mirror and recites: "Mirror, mirror, what does our future hold? Show me what happens when our stories unfold".

=== Charts ===
Chart (2015)	Peak position
US Kid Digital Songs (Billboard)	7
US Bubbling Under Hot 100 (Billboard)	5

=== Release history ===
Country	Date	Format	Label
United States	December 18, 2015	Digital download	Walt Disney
