= List of number-one albums of 2003 (Canada) =

These are the Canadian number-one albums of 2003. The chart is compiled by Nielsen Soundscan and published by Jam! Canoe, issued every Sunday. The chart also appears in Billboard magazine as Top Canadian Albums.

Issue date	Album	Artist
January 4	Up!	Shania Twain
January 11	Up!	Shania Twain
January 18	Up!	Shania Twain
January 25	Up!	Shania Twain
February 1	Up!	Shania Twain
February 8	Up!	Shania Twain
February 15	Up!	Shania Twain
February 22	Get Rich or Die Tryin'	50 Cent
March 1	Get Rich or Die Tryin'	50 Cent
March 8	Get Rich or Die Tryin'	50 Cent
March 15	Come Away With Me	Norah Jones
March 22	Come Away With Me	Norah Jones
March 29	Come Away With Me	Norah Jones
April 5	Come Away With Me	Norah Jones
April 12	One Heart	Celine Dion
April 19	Star Académie	Various Artists
April 26	Star Académie	Various Artists
May 3	Star Académie	Various Artists
May 10	American Life	Madonna
May 17	Star Académie	Various Artists
May 24	Come Away With Me	Norah Jones
May 31	The Golden Age of Grotesque	Marilyn Manson
June 7	Deftones	Deftones
June 14	How the West Was Won	Led Zeppelin
June 21	St. Anger	Metallica
June 28	Hail to the Thief	Radiohead
July 5	St. Anger	Metallica
July 12	Dangerously in Love	Beyoncé
July 19	Dutty Rock	Sean Paul
July 26	Dutty Rock	Sean Paul
August 2	Bad Boys II	Soundtrack
August 9	Bad Boys II	Soundtrack
August 16	Bad Boys II	Soundtrack
August 23	Fallen	Evanescence
August 30	Fallen	Evanescence
September 6	Now! 8	Various Artists
September 13	Metamorphosis	Hilary Duff
September 20	Now! 8	Various Artists
September 27	Now! 8	Various Artists
October 4	Thirteenth Step	A Perfect Circle
October 11	The Long Road	Nickelback
October 18	The Long Road	Nickelback
October 25	The Long Road	Nickelback
November 1	1 fille & 4 types	Celine Dion
November 8	1 fille & 4 types	Celine Dion
November 15	As Time Goes By: The Great American Songbook, Volume II	Rod Stewart
November 22	Afterglow	Sarah McLachlan
November 29	Afterglow	Sarah McLachlan
December 6	Blink-182	Blink-182
December 13	Afterglow	Sarah McLachlan
December 20	Afterglow	Sarah McLachlan
December 27	Afterglow	Sarah McLachlan

== See also ==
- List of Canadian number-one singles of 2003
