= If Only (Descendants song) =

Song by Dove Cameron

Single by Dove Cameron

from the album Descendants (Original TV Movie Soundtrack)
- Released: July 31, 2015
- Recorded: 2014
- Genre: Pop
- Length: 3:49
- Label: Walt Disney
- Songwriters: Adam Anders; Peer Astrom; Nicole Hassman
- Producer: Twin

Descendants singles chronology
"If Only" (2015)	"Rotten to the Core" (2015)

"If Only" is a song performed by American actress and singer Dove Cameron in her role of Mal from Disney Channel's 2015 television film Descendants, whose music and lyrics were composed by Adam Anders, Nikki Hassman and Peer Astrom. The song debuted at number 99 on the Billboard Hot 100 and peaked at 94. The song was included on the film soundtrack of the same name.

== Composition ==
"If Only" (2015)
A 23 second sample to second version of "If Only".

A midtempo slow-jam pop song, "If Only" exhibits elements of a ballad. Featuring multi-tracked harmonies, the song's instrumentation includes slow-bouncing piano tones and keyboard. The song was written by Adam Anders, Nikki Hassman and Peer Astrom and produced by the duo Twin. The critics of Fictively noted that part of the song is an internal monologue, meant to be fluid in the story. Lyrically, the song talks about an internal conflict over a love interest ("Should I let my heart keep listenin'? / Which way should I go?").

== Chart performance ==
On August 11, 2015, "If Only" debuted at number 99 on the Billboard Hot 100. Then it jumped 5 spots on the chart and peaking at number 94 in its second week before falling off the chart the following week. On August 22, the song peaked at number two on the Billboard Kid Digital Songs. Internationally, the song reached number 186 in France.

== Live performances ==
On August 17, 2015, Cameron performed the song at D23 Expo. On August 28, she and Ryan McCartan released an acoustic live video of the song as The Girl and the Dreamcatcher, their band. On October 19, she also performed the song at Downtown Disney during the Descendants Fan Event.

== Critical reception ==
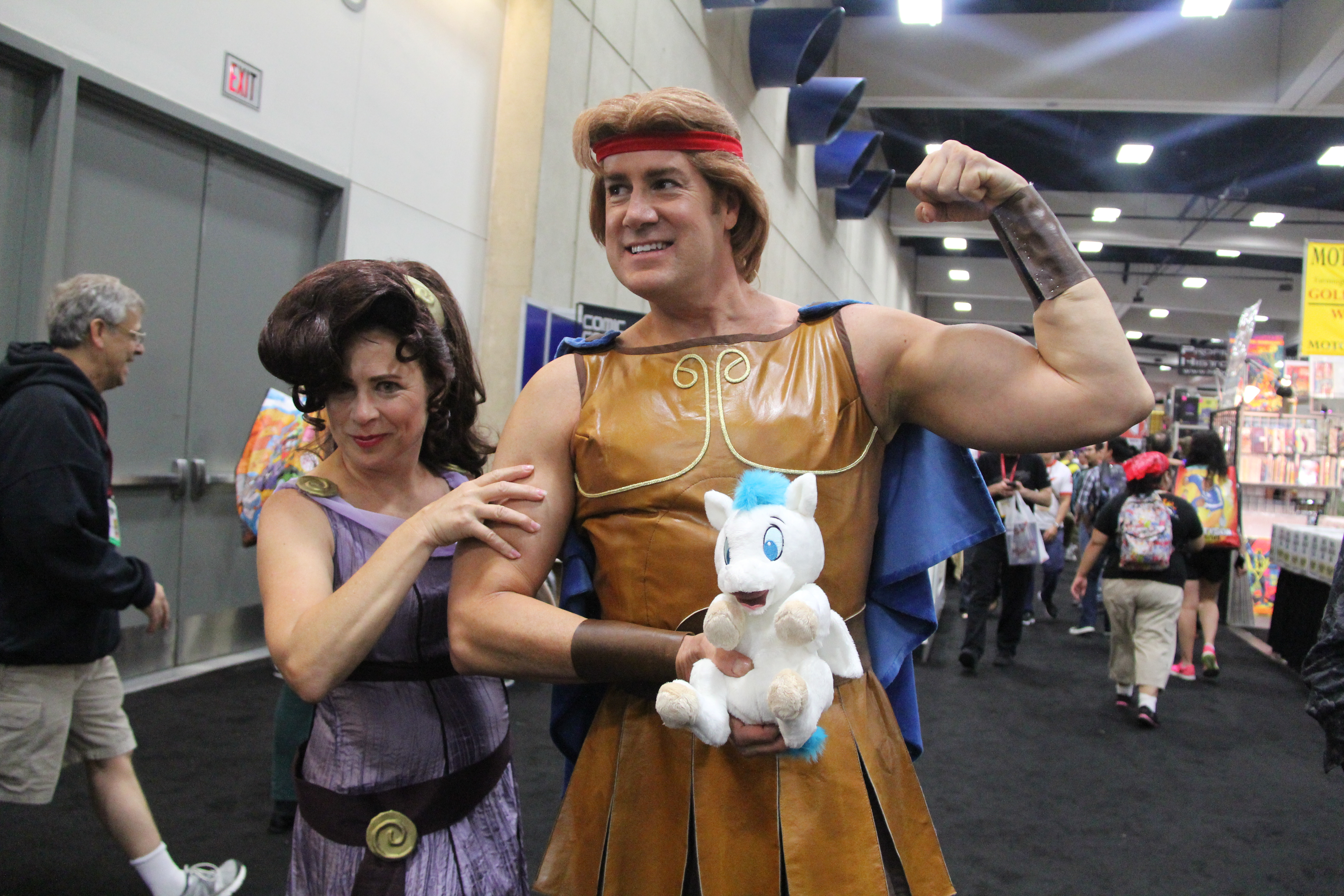
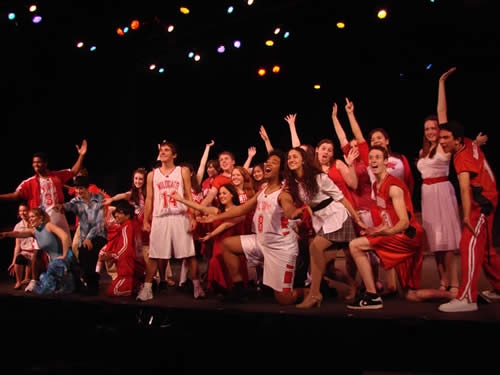
"If Only" has been compared to the soundtracks of Hercules and High School Musical 2.

The song has received positive reviews from music critics. Daynah of Disney Geek He commented that "If Only" is sweet, filled with emotions and "one of the best songs on the album". Marshal Knight of Laughing Place was positive and compared the Cameron's song to "Gotta Go My Own Way", by Vanessa Hudgens and Zac Efron from High School Musical 2 (2007) and "the good times" of The Cheetah Girls film series, saying "her voice really breaks through and shows emotion, while also belting her face off". Gary Wright of Rotoscopes said that "If Only" is the best of the album in terms of angst and emotion and one of the best works from Disney Channel Original Movies. He also compares the song to "Part of Your World", by Jodi Benson from The Little Mermaid (1989), and "I Won't Say (I'm in Love)", by Susan Egan and Cheryl Freeman from Hercules (1997).

Shirley Li of Entertainment Weekly said that although Descendants is far from perfect, "If Only" is worth it. The critic of Fictively was positive, saying that the song is the best on the album and comparing Cameron's voice to the American singer Jewel. JS Magazine said the song is "amazing" and the best along with "Rotten to the Core".

== Music video ==
The video was directed by Kenny Ortega and released on July 31, 2015. In the video, taken from a film scene, Cameron sings in a forest clearing.

== Track listings ==
- Digital download
1. "If Only" – 3:49
2. "If Only (Reprise)" – 0:41

== Charts ==
Chart performance for "If Only"
Chart (2015)	Peak position
France (SNEP)	186
UK Video Streaming (OCC)	59
US Billboard Hot 100	94
US Kid Digital Songs (Billboard)	2

== Certifications ==
Certifications for "If Only"
Region	Certification	Certified units/sales
Brazil (Pro-Música Brasil)	Gold	30,000^{‡}
New Zealand (RMNZ)	Gold	15,000^{‡}
United Kingdom (BPI)	Silver	200,000^{‡}
United States (RIAA)	Platinum	1,000,000^{‡}
^{‡} Sales+streaming figures based on certification alone.

== Release history ==
Release history for "If Only"
Country	Date	Format	Label
France	July 31, 2015	Digital download	Walt Disney
