= In Some Small Way =

Promotional single by Celine Dion

from the album Miracle
- Released: 7 March 2005
- Recorded: 2004
- Studio: Digital Insights; Chartmarker; Sony
- Genre: Pop
- Length: 5:06 (album version); 3:45 (radio edit)
- Label: Columbia; Epic
- Songwriters: Richard Page; David Tyson
- Producer: David Foster

Audio
- "In Some Small Way" on YouTube

"In Some Small Way" is a song recorded by Canadian singer Celine Dion for her album Miracle (2004). Released on 7 March 2005 as the album's second and final promotional single in the United States and Canada, it was written by Richard Page and David Tyson and produced by David Foster. A pop ballad, the track was issued to radio in a shorter radio edit. "In Some Small Way" reached number nine on the Quebec radio chart, number 14 on the Canadian Adult Contemporary chart, and number 28 on the US Adult Contemporary chart.

== Background and release ==
"In Some Small Way" was written by Page and Tyson, who also contributed the track "Sleep Tight" to the same album. Dion began performing the song during her A New Day... residency in December 2004, presenting it as a duet with her backing vocalist Barnev Valsaint. She also performed it on The Tonight Show with Jay Leno in December 2004 with Valsaint and a gospel choir. The performance from A New Day... was dedicated to raising funds for victims of the 2004 Indian Ocean earthquake.

== Commercial performance ==
"In Some Small Way" reached number nine on the Quebec radio chart. It also performed well on adult contemporary formats, peaking at number 14 in Canada and number 28 in the United States.

== Charts ==
=== Weekly charts ===
Weekly chart performance
Chart (2005)	Peak position
Canada AC (Radio & Records)	14
Quebec Radio Songs (ADISQ)	9
US Adult Contemporary (Billboard)	28

=== Year-end charts ===
Year-end chart performance
Chart (2005)	Position
US Adult Contemporary (Radio & Records)	85
