= Stand by Your Side =

Promotional single by Celine Dion

from the album One Heart
- Released: 15 September 2003
- Recorded: 2002
- Studio: Metrophonic (England); Westlake Audio (West Hollywood); Digital Insight (Winchester); Capitol Studios (Los Angeles)
- Genre: Pop
- Length: 3:33
- Label: Epic
- Songwriters: Paul Barry; Mark Taylor
- Producers: Mark Taylor; Humberto Gatica

Audio
- "Stand by Your Side" on YouTube

"Stand by Your Side" is a song by Canadian singer Celine Dion from her eighth English‑language studio album, One Heart (2003). Written by Paul Barry and Mark Taylor, and produced by Taylor with Humberto Gatica, it is a pop ballad in which Dion offers support to someone who has been deeply hurt. The track was issued in the United States on 15 September 2003 as the album's third promotional single. It reached number 17 on the US Hot Adult Contemporary Tracks chart.

== Background and release ==
In September 2003, Dion's official website announced that "Stand by Your Side" had been selected as the next adult contemporary radio single in North America. Barry and Taylor, who had previously written Cher's hit "Believe", also composed this track, with production handled by Taylor and Gatica. Musically, it is a pop ballad built around Dion's reassurance toward someone who has been badly hurt.

== Critical reception ==
Elisabeth Vincentelli of Entertainment Weekly described the song as an "inevitable power ballad". Chuck Arnold of People noted that "even her trademark ballads feature less of the vocal histrionics that we've come to expect from Dion". A review from Billboard praised the track as "elegantly restrained and as singable and well‑executed as her many previous hits", while expressing disappointment that the label did not pursue more adventurous material for the album.

== Commercial performance ==
"Stand by Your Side" debuted at number 29 on the Adult Contemporary chart on 24 September 2003, with 224 plays, becoming the second most increased AC track of the week. On 16 October 2003, it was the "Greatest Gainer" after rising to number 18. The song reached its peak of number 17 on 24 October 2003. It spent 18 weeks on the Adult Contemporary chart.

== Credits and personnel ==
Recording locations

- Metrophonic Studios (England)
- Westlake Audio (West Hollywood)
- Digital Insight (Winchester)
- Capitol Studios (Los Angeles)

Personnel

- Paul Barry – songwriting
- Mark Taylor – songwriting, production
- Humberto Gatica – production
- Adam Phillips – acoustic guitars, electric guitar
- Tim Pierce – electric guitar
- Luis Jardin – percussion
- Richard Page – backing vocals
- Kenya Hathaway – backing vocals
- Kimberley Brenner – backing vocals

Credits adapted from the liner notes of One Heart.

== Charts ==
=== Weekly charts ===
Weekly chart performance
Chart (2003–2004)	Peak position
Romania (Romanian Top 100)	52
US Adult Contemporary (Billboard)	17

=== Year-end charts ===
2003 year-end chart performance
Chart (2003)	Position
US Adult Contemporary (Radio & Records)	57

2004 year-end chart performance
Chart (2004)	Position
US Adult Contemporary (Radio & Records)	76
