= List of number-one albums of 2004 (Canada) =

These are the Canadian number-one albums of 2004. The chart is compiled by Nielsen Soundscan and published by Jam! Canoe, issued every Sunday. The chart also appears in Billboard magazine as Top Canadian Albums.

Issue date	Album	Artist
January 3	Afterglow	Sarah McLachlan
January 10	Afterglow	Sarah McLachlan
January 17	MuchDance 2004	Various Artists
January 24	Fallen	Evanescence
January 31	Fallen	Evanescence
February 7	Fallen	Evanescence
February 14	2004 Grammy Nominees	Various Artists
February 21	A Crow Left of the Murder...	Incubus
February 28	Feels Like Home	Norah Jones
March 6	Feels Like Home	Norah Jones
March 13	Feels Like Home	Norah Jones
March 20	Feels Like Home	Norah Jones
March 27	Feels Like Home	Norah Jones
April 3	Feels Like Home	Norah Jones
April 10	Confessions	Usher
April 17	Marie-Elaine Thibert	Marie-Élaine Thibert
April 24	Star Académie 2004	Various Artists
May 1	Star Académie 2004	Various Artists
May 8	Marie-Elaine Thibert	Marie-Élaine-Thibert
May 15	D12 World	D12
May 22	The Girl in the Other Room	Diana Krall
May 29	The Girl in the Other Room	Diana Krall
June 5	The Girl in the Other Room	Diana Krall
June 12	Under My Skin	Avril Lavigne
June 19	Under My Skin	Avril Lavigne
June 26	Contraband	Velvet Revolver
July 3	To the 5 Boroughs	Beastie Boys
July 10	Under My Skin	Avril Lavigne
July 17	In Between Evolution	The Tragically Hip
July 24	Under My Skin	Avril Lavigne
July 31	Under My Skin	Avril Lavigne
August 7	Under My Skin	Avril Lavigne
August 14	Under My Skin	Avril Lavigne
August 21	Under My Skin	Avril Lavigne
August 28	Under My Skin	Avril Lavigne
September 4	Under My Skin	Avril Lavigne
September 11	Live Like You Were Dying	Tim McGraw
September 18	Now! 9	Various Artists
September 25	Genius Loves Company	Ray Charles
October 2	Suit	Nelly
October 9	American Idiot	Green Day
October 16	Hilary Duff	Hilary Duff
October 23	Hilary Duff	Hilary Duff
October 30	Miracle	Céline Dion
November 6	Stardust… The Great American Songbook Volume III	Rod Stewart
November 13	Stardust… The Great American Songbook Volume III	Rod Stewart
November 20	Stardust… The Great American Songbook Volume III	Rod Stewart
November 27	Greatest Hits	Shania Twain
December 4	Encore	Eminem
December 11	How to Dismantle an Atomic Bomb	U2
December 18	Greatest Hits	Shania Twain
December 25	Greatest Hits	Shania Twain

== See also ==
- List of Canadian number-one singles of 2004
