= Anne Geddes =

Australian photographer (born 1956)

Anne Geddes MNZM
- Born: 1956 (age 69–70); Home Hill, Queensland, Australia
- Occupations: Photographer, author, artist, businesswoman
- Years active: 1981–present
- Known for: Infant photography
- Website: annegeddes.com

Anne Elizabeth Geddes MNZM (born 1956) is an Australian-born, New York City-based portrait photographer known primarily for her elaborately staged photographs of infants.

Geddes's books have been published in 83 countries. According to Amazon.com, she has sold more than 18 million books and 13 million calendars. In 1997, Cedco Publishing sold more than 1.8 million calendars and date books bearing Geddes' photography. Her 1996 debut book Down in the Garden, was featured on the Oprah Winfrey Show and made it to the New York Times bestseller list. Her books have been translated into 23 languages.

== Early life ==
In her 2007 autobiography Labor of Love, Geddes talked about her difficult early years at their family cattle farm in Queensland, Australia. She dropped out of school at 17 and left home. Later, she met and married Kel Geddes, and moved to Hong Kong in 1983 for his work in television. There, at age 25, she taught herself photography using her husband's 35mm Pentax K1000 camera. By the time the couple returned to Sydney two years later, she had built a small portfolio. She started specializing in baby photography after using photographs of her two daughters for a family Christmas card which proved popular.

== Career ==
Geddes became a professional photographer at age 30 after she moved to Melbourne due to her husband's work. She assisted a local photographer before starting her own studio from her garage.

Geddes also shoots for philanthropic causes. Geddes created her own philanthropic program, the Geddes Philanthropic Trust, whose primary focus was to raise awareness of child abuse and neglect. In 2013, she created a series for the survivors of meningococcal disease. The photographs depict families and children that have been affected by the disease and honours those who have survived. She shot photographs of 15 child survivors of meningitis for the Protecting Our Tomorrows: Portraits of Meningococcal Disease campaign. She has also worked with March of Dimes.

Geddes first retrospective exhibition opened at the New Art Museum Tübingen (NKT), Germany on 16 August 2025.

=== Dolls ===
Several lines of dolls were produced inspired by Geddes photography.

In January 2000 Unimax Ltd released a line of plush and dolls based off Geddes photography.

The Anne Geddes Collectible Doll Line began in 2007, produced by MasterPiece Dolls. The dolls were sculpted by Laura Tuzio-Ross, who was approached by the Anne Geddes Group in January 2007. Geddes met in Tuzio-Ross in person to discuss the design details and the first doll, The Woodland Fairy, was released in 2007. Like the majority of Tuzio-Ross's work, the baby dolls were realistic, but featured fantasy outfits designed by Geddes.

== Process ==
Geddes does not audition babies for use as models because she believes all babies are beautiful. Instead, she keeps in touch with multiple birth and twin clubs and has thousands of photographs on file that parents have sent her. Geddes currently resides in New York with her husband Kel.

A typical sitting takes place in the morning when the babies are well-rested, and lasts about half an hour; otherwise, the babies could get too bored or fussy. "You have to be really fast", Geddes says about getting good shots. She sets up her studio in advance — props, lighting, cameras, and equipment — so that all the baby or babies have to do is sit. Many of her props are custom made, such as oversized shoes and flowerpots. She keeps the babies' parents nearby for extra assistance with expressions.

== Publications ==
- Down in the Garden (1996), ISBN 0-7407-3540-3
- Children's collection, Anne Geddes(1996), Cedeo, USA
  - Garden Friends, ISBN 1-55912-342-7,1996
  - Garden Families
  - Garden Colors
  - Color
  - Faces
  - Dress ups
- Geddes, Anne (1997). Anne Geddes Birthdays and Anniversaries: Orchid Babies. Cedco. ISBN 978-1-55912-347-1.
- The Twelve Days of Christmas (1997)
- Until Now (1998), ISBN 0-7407-3541-1
- Geddes, Anne (2000). 10 in the Bed. Andrews McMeel. ISBN 978-0-7407-1255-5.
- Pure (2002), ISBN 0-7407-2641-2
- Geddes, Anne (2003). Until Now. Andrews McMeel. ISBN 978-0-7407-3541-7.
- Miracle: A Celebration of New, with Celine Dion, (2004) ISBN 0-7407-4696-0
- Geddes, Anne (2005). Shapes. Andrews McMeel. ISBN 978-0-7407-5585-9.
- Geddes, Anne (2005). Colors. Andrews McMeel. ISBN 978-0-7407-5583-5.
- Geddes, Anne (2007). A Labor of Love: An Autobiography. Andrews McMeel. ISBN 978-0-7407-6562-9.
- Geddes, Anne (2008). Be Gentle with the Young. Andrews McMeel. ISBN 978-0-7407-7771-4.
- Beginnings (2010)
- Anne Geddes Little Blessings (2014). ISBN 1402298188.

== Honours and awards ==
In the 2004 Queen's Birthday Honours, Geddes was appointed a Member of the New Zealand Order of Merit, for services to photography and the community.

In 2017 Geddes was inducted into the International Photography Hall of Fame and Museum.

== Popular culture ==
In a skit on The Ronnie Johns Half Hour, Geddes (played by Felicity Ward) helps a Chinese family hide their additional children from one-child policy inspectors by camouflaging them in conspicuous places, which the inspectors are unable to notice.

McSweeney's Internet Tendency, the humour site of McSweeney's, published a Short Imagined Monologue called "An Anne Geddes Baby Grows Up".

Humor website The Onion spoofed Geddes's style with "Anne Geddes Starting to Lose It".

In the eighth episode of the sixth season of Friends, entitled "The One with Ross's Teeth", Joey Tribbiani complains to his roommate Janine about a Geddes photograph she hung on the living room wall. The photograph depicted a baby Joey didn't recognise dressed as a water lily. After being told that Anne Geddes is a famous artist, he assumes that the baby is Anne Geddes.

On the comedy website called Funny or Die, there was a humorous skit on the adulthood of the babies from her photos.

On the 26 June 2017 episode of The Late Show with Stephen Colbert, Colbert shows a drawing of Sean Spicer and jokingly showed how Spicer would look as depicted by famous artists, including Geddes.

In the American Dad! episode "The Census of the Lambs", Klaus copies Geddes's photographs in his own photoshoot and gets attacked by an angry version of Geddes.

In an episode of The Office Angela Martin and Andrew Bernard use Jan Levinson's baby (Astrid) in a Geddes-style photo shoot, while the two of them are visiting Dunder Mifflin for Jan's debauched baby shower. Jan finds them in the break room, and is enraged that they are photographing a baby using a flash, and that Astrid is on a table surrounded by vegetables and dressed in cabbage leaves. Geddes's name is never mentioned directly, but her style of photography was heavily implied.

In Schitt's Creek, season six episode seven mentions character Moira Rose's collaboration with Anne Geddes on a print advertisement for heartburn.
