= Contre nature =

Promotional single by Celine Dion

from the album 1 fille & 4 types
- Language: French
- Released: 18 March 2004
- Recorded: 2–11 May 2003
- Studio: Digital Insight (Las Vegas)
- Genre: Pop
- Length: 4:09 (album version); 3:33 (radio edit)
- Label: Columbia
- Songwriter: Jacques Veneruso
- Producer: Erick Benzi

Music video
- "Contre nature" on YouTube

"Contre nature" (lit. 'Against nature') is a song by Canadian singer Celine Dion from her twentieth studio album, 1 fille & 4 types (2003). Written by Jacques Veneruso and produced by Erick Benzi, it was issued as a promotional single on 18 March 2004. The track received airplay in several Francophone regions, reaching number two in Quebec. The music video premiered on 30 April 2004.

== Background and release ==
Dion began working on her next French‑language album on 8 October 2002 in Paris, where she met with four French songwriters and producers: Jean-Jacques Goldman, Erick Benzi, Jacques Veneruso and Gildas Arzel. After four days of rehearsals, they reunited in Las Vegas in May 2003 during Dion's break from performing in A New Day.... Recording sessions were held between 2 and 11 May 2003.

Goldman, who wrote and produced Dion's best‑selling French‑language album D'eux, served as artistic director for 1 fille & 4 types. Veneruso wrote "Contre nature", which Benzi produced. It was selected as the album's third single and released for promotional use only. The cover art for the promotional CD containing the radio edit was unveiled on 6 March 2004.

"Contre nature" was sent to radio in France on 18 March 2004 and in Canada on 12 April 2004. The music video premiered on 30 April 2004.

A promotional DVD single was released in France, including the music video and a making‑of feature. In 2005, the song was included on Dion's greatest hits album On ne change pas.

== Commercial performance ==
In Quebec, "Contre nature" reached number two on the ADISQ Correspondents Radio chart. It also entered the BDS Radio chart on 1 May 2004, peaking at number 22 and spending 18 weeks in the top fifty. In Poland, the song reached number nine on the Regional Airplay chart on 2 May 2004. In Wallonia, Belgium, it peaked at number 38 on the Ultratop Airplay chart on 25 May 2004. In Flanders, Belgium, it reached number 70 on 27 April 2004.

== Music video ==
The music video, directed by Didier Kerbrat, was filmed on 27 March 2004 in the Mojave Desert and released on 30 April 2004. It was later included on Dion's 2005 greatest hits DVD collection, On ne change pas, along with the making‑of feature.

== Charts ==
Chart performance
Chart (2004)	Peak position
Belgium (Ultratop Airplay Flanders)	70
Belgium (Ultratop Airplay Wallonia)	38
Poland (Regional Airplay)	9
Quebec Radio Songs (ADISQ)	2
Quebec Radio Songs (BDS)	22
