= Et je t'aime encore =

Single by Celine Dion

from the album 1 fille & 4 types
- Language: French
- B-side: "Et je t'aime encore" (instrumental)
- Released: 16 February 2004
- Recorded: 2–11 May 2003
- Studio: Digital Insight (Las Vegas)
- Genre: Pop
- Length: 3:26
- Label: Columbia
- Songwriters: Jean-Jacques Goldman; J. Kapler
- Producer: Erick Benzi

Celine Dion singles chronology
"Have You Ever Been in Love" (2003)	"Et je t'aime encore" (2004)	"Je ne vous oublie pas" (2005)

Music video
- "Et je t'aime encore" on YouTube

"Et je t'aime encore" (lit. 'And I still love you') is a song by Canadian singer Celine Dion from her twentieth studio album, 1 fille & 4 types (2003). Written by Jean-Jacques Goldman and J. Kapler and produced by Erick Benzi, it was issued as the album's second single on 16 February 2004. "Et je t'aime encore" reached number two in Quebec, number 14 in Belgium's Wallonia, number 16 in France, and number 31 in Switzerland.

== Background and release ==
Dion began working on her next French-language album on 8 October 2002 in Paris, where she met with four French songwriters and producers: Jean-Jacques Goldman, Erick Benzi, Jacques Veneruso, and Gildas Arzel. After four days of rehearsals, she met with them again in Las Vegas in May 2003 during a break from performing in A New Day.... The songs were recorded between 2 and 11 May 2003. Goldman, who wrote and produced Dion's best-selling French-language albums, D'eux, oversaw 1 fille & 4 types as artistic director. "Et je t'aime encore", selected as the second single, was sent to radio on 11 December 2003. The song was written by Goldman and his brother J. Kapler and produced by Benzi. The music video was sent to video outlets in late December 2003, and a limited CD single was released in Belgium, France, and Switzerland in February 2004. The English-language version, titled "Je t'aime encore", appeared on One Heart in March 2003. In 2005, "Et je t'aime encore" was included on Dion's greatest hits album, On ne change pas.

== Critical reception ==
Betty Clarke of The Guardian commented on the English version, "Je t'aime encore": "But when she stops trying to be relevant and ceases to be a one-trick pony with a vast lung capacity (as she does on the folky Je t'aime encore), Dion proves she can be more than a series of hollow - if album-shifting - sentiments".

== Commercial performance ==
"Et je t'aime encore" entered the airplay charts in Francophone countries in late December 2003, peaking at number two in Quebec, number 11 in Belgium's Wallonia, and number 59 in Belgium's Flanders. After the commercial release in February 2004, the single reached number 14 in Wallonia, number 16 in France, and number 31 in Switzerland.

== Music video ==
The music video, directed by Yannick Saillet, was filmed in the Whiskey Bar in Las Vegas in October 2003 and released in late December 2003. In 2005, it was included on Dion's greatest hits DVD collection, On ne change pas.

== Formats and track listing ==
- French CD single
1. "Et je t'aime encore" – 3:26
2. "Et je t'aime encore" (instrumental) – 3:26
3. "Apprends-moi" – 4:45
- French CD maxi-single
1. "Et je t'aime encore" – 3:26
2. "Et je t'aime encore" (instrumental) – 3:26
3. "Des milliers de baisers" – 3:46
4. "Tu nages" – 3:09

== Charts ==
=== Weekly charts ===
Weekly chart performance
Chart (2003–2004)	Peak position
Belgium (Ultratip Bubbling Under Flanders)	17
Belgium (Ultratop 50 Wallonia)	14
European Hot 100 Singles (Billboard)	52
France (SNEP)	16
Quebec Radio Songs (ADISQ)	2
Quebec Radio Songs (BDS)	4
Switzerland (Schweizer Hitparade)	31

=== Year-end charts ===
Year-end chart performance
Chart (2003)	Position
Belgium (Ultratop 50 Wallonia)	71

== Release history ==
Release history
Region	Date	Format	Label	Ref.
Belgium	16 February 2004	CD	Columbia	
France; Switzerland	23 February 2004	CD	Columbia	
