= Miracle: A Celebration of New Life =

2004 book by Anne Geddes and Celine Dion

- Author: Anne Geddes; Celine Dion
- Language: English
- Genre: Art book
- Publisher: Andrews McMeel Publishing
- Publication date: 2004
- ISBN: 0-7407-4696-0

Miracle: A Celebration of New Life is a book created through the collaboration of photographer Anne Geddes and Canadian singer Celine Dion. The project combines music and photography, centring on themes of new life and infancy.

The book was published in nine languages across 22 countries simultaneously and remained on The New York Times bestseller list for six weeks. Miracle also appeared on The Wall Street Journal nonfiction bestseller list, as well as the Publishers Weekly, Barnes & Noble, amazon.com Canada, and BookSense nonfiction hardcover bestseller lists. It reached number one on the Wal-Mart.com bestseller list for two weeks. In Germany, Miracle debuted at number three on the GEO magazine bestseller list for December 2004 and remained within the top 10 at number six in January 2005. It was number 12 on the Livre Hebdo Fall 2004 illustrated books bestseller list in France. The same year, the Miracle CD was released, with the inlay including a small selection of photographs from the book. The album was a Billboard Top five international bestseller in December 2004.

== Editions ==
- Hardcover Miracle: A Celebration of New Life (2004), Andrews McMeel Publishing; Book/CD/DVD edition (12 October 2004) ISBN 0-7407-4696-0
- Paperback Miracle: A Celebration of New Life (2005), Warner Bros. Publications (March 2005) ISBN 0-7579-3813-2
