= Have You Ever Been in Love (song) =

Single by Celine Dion

from the album One Heart
- Released: 3 November 2003
- Studio: Paradise Sound; Master Plan
- Genre: Pop
- Length: 4:08
- Label: Columbia; Epic
- Songwriters: Anders Bagge; Peer Åström; Thomas Nichols; Daryl Hall; Laila Bagge
- Producers: Anders Bagge; Peer Astrom

Celine Dion singles chronology
"Tout l'or des hommes" (2003)	"Have You Ever Been in Love" (2003)	"Et je t'aime encore" (2004)

Music video
- "Have You Ever Been in Love" on YouTube

"Have You Ever Been in Love" is a song by Canadian singer Celine Dion, first recorded for her seventh English-language studio album, A New Day Has Come (2002), and later included—unchanged—on her eighth English-language album, One Heart (2003). Written by Anders Bagge, Peer Åström, Tom Nichols, Daryl Hall, and Laila Bagge, and produced by Bagge and Peer, the track is a power ballad built around a piano‑led opening that gradually expands into a sweeping, string‑driven finale. Critics responded positively to the song on both albums, often describing it as one of the standout ballads and noting vocal similarities between Dion and Barbra Streisand.

"Have You Ever Been in Love" was issued on 14 April 2003 as a promotional single from One Heart in the United States and Canada, and on 3 November 2003 it became the album's third commercial single in selected European markets. It spent 14 weeks at number two on the US Hot Adult Contemporary Tracks, setting a record for the most weeks stalled in the second position. The music video was filmed in Los Angeles between 29 and 30 April 2003 and released on 2 June 2003.

== Background and release ==
"Have You Ever Been in Love" was written by Anders Bagge, Peer Åström, Tom Nichols, Daryl Hall, and Laila Bagge, with production by Bagge and Peer. The track, described as a power ballad, moves from a soft, piano‑based introduction into a dramatic, orchestral climax. It first appeared on A New Day Has Come in 2002 and was later included on One Heart in 2003 without any changes.

The song was released on 14 April 2003 as One Heart's second promotional single in the United States and Canada, and on 3 November 2003 it became the album's third commercial single in selected European countries.

A sheet of paper containing Spanish lyrics for the song surfaced online several years later. It included Dion's signature and phonetic notes beneath the adapted text, titled "¿Sabes Cómo Es El Amor?" with the original English title in brackets. The sheet, dated 6 May 2003, prompted speculation that a Spanish version had been recorded, although no such version has been released.

In October 2008, "Have You Ever Been in Love" was added to the European edition of Dion's greatest hits album My Love: Ultimate Essential Collection.

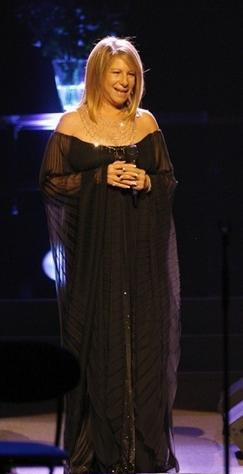
Many critics compared Dion's vocals to those of Barbra Streisand.

== Critical reception ==
Larry Flick of Billboard described the track as a welcome return to Dion's classic ballad style, praising her "appealing palette of vocal colors" that range from delicate to full‑bodied. Ken Tucker of Entertainment Weekly wrote that the song "builds in intensity to sound like a James Bond movie theme as delivered by Barbra Streisand".

Stephen Thomas Erlewine of AllMusic called it "unapologetically Barbra Streisand‑esque" and named it one of the standout tracks on both A New Day Has Come and One Heart. Barnes & Noble described it as a "soaring" ballad. Rebecca Wallwork wrote that it "sticks to the tried‑and‑true formula of allowing Dion's voice to take center stage".

Elisabeth Vincentelli of Entertainment Weekly wrote that Dion's approach across One Heart made the song's climactic vocal release "particularly satisfying", calling it the album's strongest example of her ability to convey sincerity in a highly polished pop ballad. Chuck Arnold of People called it "one of the strongest cuts from the album", while Sal Cinquemani of Slant Magazine described it as a "classic‑sounding ballad".

== Commercial performance ==
"Have You Ever Been in Love" spent 14 weeks at number two on the US Adult Contemporary chart, setting a record for the most weeks in the runner‑up position. In Sweden, the song debuted at number 57 on 14 November 2003, dropped off the chart the following week, and later re‑entered at number 59, spending two weeks on the chart.

== Music video ==
Dion in the virtual desert in the music video, where she is shown with short blonde hair.

A recording of Dion performing the song at The Colosseum at Caesars Palace in Las Vegas was initially intended to serve as the music video. However, Sony Music requested a new concept, and director Antti Jokinen was brought in. The final video was filmed in Los Angeles on 29 and 30 April 2003 and released on 2 June 2003. It was later included on the enhanced CD single.

The video depicts Dion standing on a long pier stretching across a barren landscape. Intercut scenes show couples and children, including moments near a large branch and on a wrecked boat. As the song builds, water floods the landscape, lifting the boat and filling the space beneath the pier. The video ends with Dion singing against a sunset backdrop.

== Live performances ==
Dion performed "Have You Ever Been in Love" between March and November 2003 during her show A New Day... at Caesars Palace in Las Vegas. She also performed it on VH1 Divas and the Today Show that same year.

== Accolades ==
In 2004, "Have You Ever Been in Love" received the ASCAP London Award and the BMI London Award as one of the most performed songs in the United States.

== Formats and track listing ==
- European CD single
1. "Have You Ever Been in Love" – 4:08
2. "All by Myself" – 5:12
- European CD maxi-single
1. "Have You Ever Been in Love" – 4:08
2. "Have You Ever Been in Love" (edit) – 2:58
3. "All by Myself" – 5:12
4. "Have You Ever Been in Love" (video) – 4:07

== Charts ==
=== Weekly charts ===
Weekly chart performance
Chart (2003–2004)	Peak position
Hungary (Rádiós Top 40)	27
Quebec Radio Songs (ADISQ)	12
Sweden (Sverigetopplistan)	57
US Bubbling Under Hot 100 (Billboard)	4
US Adult Contemporary (Billboard)	2

=== Year-end charts ===
Year-end chart performance
Chart (2003)	Position
US Adult Contemporary (Billboard)	8
