= Vito Luprano =

Canadian music producer and talent manager

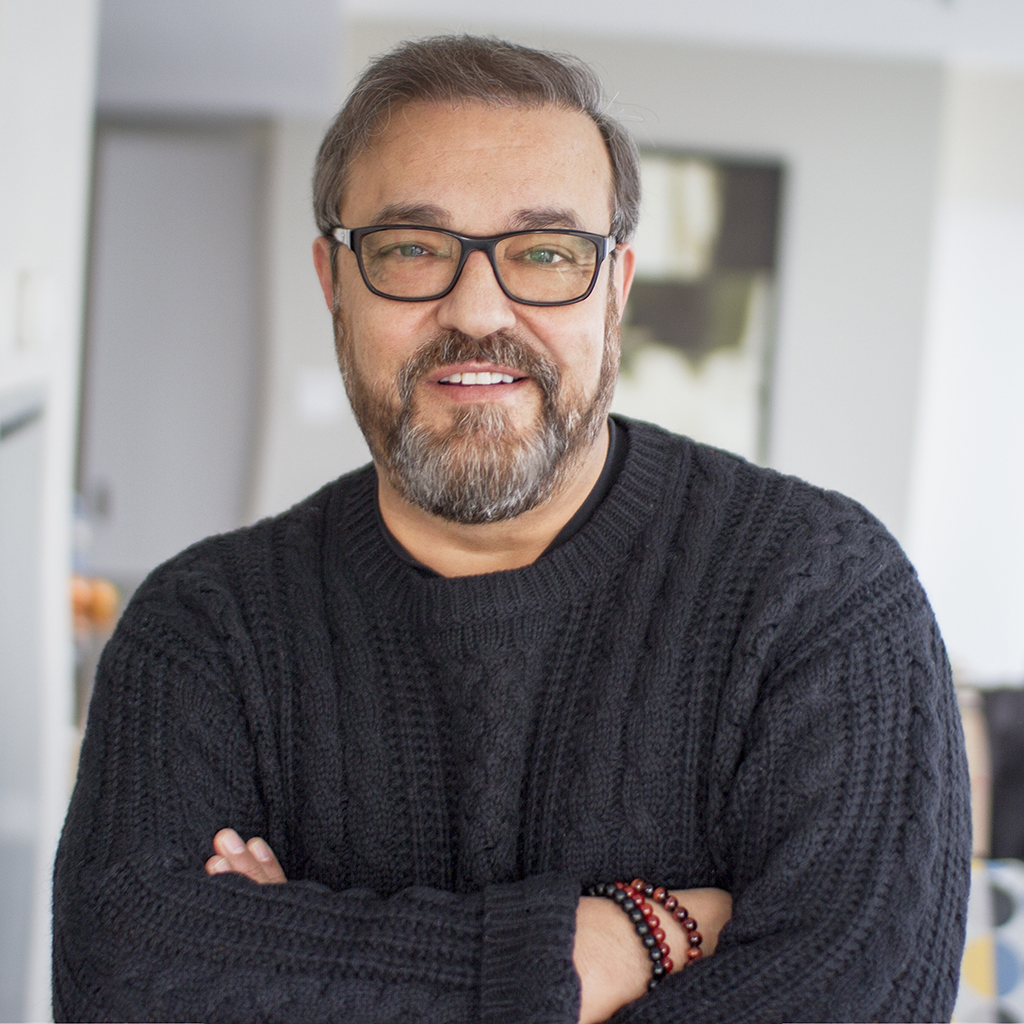
- Luprano in 2016
- Born: 6 April 1956 (age 70); Italy
- Occupations: Executive Producer, Talent Manager
- Years active: 1980–present
- Website: www.lupoone.com

Vito Luprano (born April 6, 1956) is a Canadian music producer and talent manager. He was Vice-President of A&R for Sony Music Canada from 1986 until 2009. During those years, he oversaw the production of recordings for many musicians and bands, mainly in Quebec. Alongside René Angélil, Luprano executive produced over 20 albums for Céline Dion.

== Career ==
Luprano began his career as an independent radio promoter while in his 20s, working primarily in Montreal, Quebec, Canada. He was a member of the Canadian Record Pool, but left in 1978 to become director of promotion at Generation Records. By the 1980s he had obtained a marketing, radio and press position with CBS Records. By 1986, Luprano was promoted to Director of A&R for Sony Music Canada (formerly CBS Records). It was during that same year that Luprano signed Celine Dion and her success lead to his promotion to Senior Vice President of A&R for Sony Music Canada. During the period of 1986 to 2009, Vito Luprano was responsible for executive producing over 20 of Céline Dion's albums. In addition to working with Dion, Luprano was also producing for French Canadian music artists including Garou, Marilou and Mario Pelchat. In 1996 he signed the Quebec pop R&B band Soul Attorneys.

In early 2009, Luprano left Sony Music Canada, intending to take some time off. However, shortly thereafter he was introduced to a young singer/songwriter, Kristina Maria. After working with her to develop several single recordings, Luprano signed recording artist Kristina Maria under his independent label Lupo One Productions in 2012 and released her debut album Tell the World. In 2013, the album was nominated for a Juno Award.
