= Peer Åström =

Swedish musician and songwriter

Peer Åström (born in Ljusdal, Sweden) is a Swedish composer, lyricist, musician, and record producer and partner. He has collaborated with artists such as Madonna, Celine Dion, Enrique Iglesias, Miley Cyrus, and Selena Gomez, contributing to a staggering 125 albums with 520 performers. Notably, he was involved in the popular TV series Glee, earning two #1 Billboard singles, eight #1 iTunes singles, and 4 Grammy nominations. In film and TV scoring, his notable projects include the musical Journey to Bethlehem, American Horror Story, the Fox TV series Monarch, the Nickelodeon show Kally's Mashup, and the movie The Prom. Åström's earlier works include the DreamWorks Animation Film Captain Underpants: The First Epic Movie and scoring for the Dirty Dancing (2017 film) soundtrack. Additionally, he co-scored and co-produced The Passion: New Orleans.

== Career ==
After high school, Åström studied music, moved to Stockholm, and became a session musician for several artists. Åström plays bass, guitar, keyboards and drums. After Anders Bagge, already a well-known producer and songwriter, heard a couple of Åström's songs, he invited Åström to collaborate with him on some writing/recording projects. Later in 2001, Bagge and Åström began to write and produce together on a regular basis. Åström eventually signed to Bagge's record company Murlyn Music Group.

From its inception in 2009 to the last season in 2015, Peer worked on the wildly popular hit television series Glee, where he served as co-writer and co-music producer. Glee instantly became a cultural phenomena and earned two #1 Billboard singles, eight #1 iTunes singles, over 70 million singles and 18 million albums sold worldwide, and 4 Grammy nominations to name a few accolades. All this while also setting a world record of 214 Billboard hits by a single artist. During the monumental and widely-watched 45th Super Bowl, the track See The USA ft. Glee Cast, produced by Peer, debuted.

Peer co-wrote Celine Dion's "Have You Ever Been in Love" and "Sorry for Love". As a result, he was invited to Miami, Florida by Celine Dion and her producer Vito Luprano to work on the rest of the album A New Day Has Come. The album went on to sell over 12 million copies worldwide. Celine Dion's cover hit single "I Drove All Night" was co-produced by Peer Åström. In 2007 Åstrom also wrote the song "Fade away" for Dion's Album "Taking Chances." Åström also co-wrote and co-produced two songs with Cyndi Lauper and Johan Bobäck for Lauper's 2008 album Bring Ya to the Brink.

Peer co-founded Epidemic Sound in 2009. It is the world's biggest music supplier for online content creators, i.e. YouTube, TikTok, Instagram, Facebook, etc. In 2021 Blackstone partnered with Epidemic Sound to help accelerate its growth and execute its mission. There are currently 2 billion daily views of Youtube videos including Epidemic Sound music, 500 million daily views of TikTok videos, and 40 million daily plays on music streaming platforms.

== Awards ==
	Year	Nominee / Work	Award	Result
Grammy Awards				
	2011	Glee: The Music, Volume 1	Best Compilation Soundtrack for Visual Media	Nominated
	2012	Glee: The Music, Volume 4	Best Compilation Soundtrack for Visual Media	Nominated
	2013	Rock of Ages (2012 soundtrack)	Best Compilation Soundtrack for Visual Media	Nominated
	2014	Cee Lo's Magic Moment	Best Traditional Pop Vocal Album	Nominated
Golden Globe Awards				
	2010	Glee	Best Musical or Comedy	Won
	2011	Glee	Best Musical or Comedy	Won
People's Choice Awards				
	2010	Glee	Favorite New TV Comedy	Won
	2011	Glee	Favorite New TV Comedy	Won

== Film and TV Score Credits ==
Project	Work	W = Written P = Produced
Glee Fox TV Series Season 1, 2, 3, 4, 5, and 6	Featured Songs	W P
Rock of Ages (2012 film)	Score + All Featured Songs	P
Captain Underpants: The First Epic Movie	All Featured Songs	W P
Journey to Bethlehem	Score + All Featured Songs	W P
The Prom (film)	All Featured Songs	P
American Horror Story TV Series Season 1, 2, 3, and 4	Featured Songs	P
Perfect Harmony (TV series)	All Featured Songs	P
Super Bowl Chevrolet Commercial	See The USA ft. Glee Cast	P
Monarch (American TV series)	All Featured Songs	P
New Year's Eve (2011 film)	Featured Songs	P
The Passion: New Orleans TV Special FOX	All Featured Songs	P
Camp Rock 2: The Final Jam	Wouldn't Change a Thing (Camp Rock song) feat. Demi Lovato and Joe Jonas	W P
Descendants (2015 film)	If Only (Descendants song) and If Only Remix feat. Dove Cameron	W P
Starstruck (2010 film)	Hero and Hero (Unplugged)	W P
Kally's Mashup TV Series Season 1 + 2	All Featured Songs	W P
Dirty Dancing (2017 film) ABC Three Hour Special	All Featured Songs	P
Beck (Swedish TV series): The Scorpion.	Score	W P
Beck (Swedish TV series): The Unclaimed Girl.	Score	W P
Beck (Swedish TV series): The Vulture.	Score	W P
Beck (Swedish TV series): The Lawyer.	Score	W P
Beck (Swedish TV series): The Japanese Shunga Painting.	Score	W P
Beck (Swedish TV series): The Weak Link.	Score	W P
Beck (Swedish TV series): The Silent Scream.	Score	W P
Beck (Swedish TV series): In The Name Of God.	Score	W P
Liv & Maddie	True Love feat. Dove Cameron	W P

== Music credits ==
Artist/Project	Song	Feature(s)	W = Written P = Produced
Madonna "Confessions on a Dancefloor" (Grammy Nominated)	Get Together		W P
Celine Dion	Sorry for Love		W P
	I Drove All Night		P
	Naked		W P
	Sorry for Love Ballad Version		W P
	Ain't Gonna Look the Other Way		W P
	You and I		P
	I Drove All Night (Chrysler Commercial)		P
	Have You Ever Been in Love (Chrysler Commercial)		W P
	You and I (Air Canada Commercial)		P
	My Precious One		W P
	Fade Away		W P
CeeLo Green "CeeLo's Magic Moment" (Grammy Nominated)	What Christmas Means To Me		P
	Baby It's Cold Outside	Christina Aguilera	P
	This Christmas		P
	White Christmas		P
	All I Need Is Love	Disney's the Muppets	W P
	You're a Mean One, Mr. Grinch	Straight No Chaser	P
	Please Come Home for Christmas		P
	Run Rudolph Run		P
	All I Want for Christmas		P
	Mary Did You Know		P
	River		P
	Silent Night		P
Tori Kelly	Hollow Remix	Big Sean	P
Tori Kelly	Hollow		P
Cyndi Lauper "Bring Ya to the Brink" (Grammy Nominated)	Into the Nightlife		W P
	Echo		W P
Enrique Iglesias	It Must Be Love (Music For Relief Haiti)		W P
Miley Cyrus, Selena Gomez, Demi Lovato, and Jonas Brothers	Send It On		W P
Selena Gomez	Spotlight		W P
Kelly Clarkson and Justin Guarini	Timeless		W P
Lea Michele "Christmas in the City"	It's The Most Wonderful Time Of The Year		P
	Have Yourself a Merry Little Christmas		P
	Christmas in New York		W P
	I'll Be Home for Christmas	Jonathan Groff	P
	Do You Want to Build a Snowman		P
	Rockin Around the Christmas Tree		P
	Silent Night		P
	White Christmas	Darren Chris	P
	Silver Bells		P
	Angels We Have Heard on High	Cynthia Erivo	P
	O Holy Night		P
Nick Lachey	Beautiful		W P
	I Do It for You		W P
	You're Not Alone		W P
Westlife	I Promise You That		P
Cash Campbell	Cannonball		W P
	Don't Wanna Think About It		W P
	Bump		P
	The Woman in It		P
	Kiss About It		P
	The In Between		P
	Weddings and Funerals		P
Fady Maalouf	Blessed		W
Garou "Piece of My Soul"	Stand Up		P
	Accidental		P
	Burning		P
	Heaven's Table		P
	All the Way		P
	Take a Piece of My Soul		P
	What's the Time in NYC		P
	You And I		P
	First Day Of My Life		P
	Nothing Else Matters		P
	Beautiful Regret		P
	Coming Home		W P
Hall & Oates	Have You Ever Been in Love		W
Jesse McCartney	Without You		W
Miranda Cosgrove	Oh Oh		W
Ashley Tisdale	Blame It on the Beat		W P
Guy Sebastian	Cover on My Heart		W P
Lara Fabian	I Guess I Loved You		W P
Alesha Dixon	Free		W P
	Lipstick		W P
Triple 8	Knockout		W P
Lorie	Un Garcon		P
Delta Goodrem	If I Forget		W P
No Angels	Lovestory		W P
	Ain't Gonna Look The Other Way		W
LaShell Griffin	Learn to Breathe		W P
	I Can Only Imagine		P
Alexander	There's No Good In Goodbye		W
