= A New Day Has Come (TV special) =

- Starring: Celine Dion; Destiny's Child; Brian McKnight
- Country of origin: United States
- No. of episodes: 1

Production
- Running time: 44 mins (w/o commercial breaks)

Original release
- Network: CBS
- Release: April 7, 2002

A New Day Has Come is the third American television special by Canadian singer Celine Dion that was broadcast by CBS on 7 April 2002. It promoted Dion's first English-language album in two years, A New Day Has Come, and marked her return after a two-year break from the music industry. The program was filmed on 2 March 2002 at the Kodak Theatre in Los Angeles, California. It shows Dion (backed by her touring band) performing songs from the album, along with several of her best-known hits. She was joined by guests Grammy-winning R&B group Destiny's Child and singer Brian McKnight.

The special also included a private one-on-one interview in which Dion discussed her return to the music industry and her experience on 11 September 2001.

== Set list ==
1. "A New Day Has Come"
2. "I'm Alive"
3. "Acoustic Movie Medley: "Because You Loved Me" / "Beauty and the Beast" (with Brian McKnight) / "My Heart Will Go On"
4. "Have You Ever Been in Love"
5. "Emotion" (with Destiny's Child)
6. "When the Wrong One Loves You Right" (with Destiny's Child)
7. "At Last" (with violinist Roddy Chiong)
8. "Nature Boy"

Additional songs were performed during the concert but were not included in the broadcast

- "Aun Existe Amor"
- "Goodbye's (The Saddest Word)"
- "Ten Days"
