= The Best So Far... 2018 Tour Edition =

Greatest hits album by Celine Dion
- Released: 30 May 2018
- Recorded: 1993–2013
- Genre: Pop
- Length: 74:56
- Label: Columbia
- Producer: Walter Afanasieff; Peer Åström; Erick Benzi; David Foster; Jean-Jacques Goldman; Kristian Lundin; Vito Luprano; Max Martin; Ben Moody; Christopher Neil; Aldo Nova; Rick Nowels; Sham & Motesart; John Shanks; Billy Steinberg; Jim Steinman; Ric Wake

Celine Dion chronology
Un peu de nous (2017)	The Best So Far... 2018 Tour Edition (2018)	Courage (2019)

The Best So Far... 2018 Tour Edition is the fourth English-language greatest hits album by Canadian singer Celine Dion. It was released by Columbia Records in selected Asia-Pacific countries to coincide with Dion's 2018 tour. The album was issued in Japan on 30 May 2018, in Australia on 6 July 2018, and in New Zealand on 20 July 2018. It includes studio versions of 17 songs recorded between 1993 and 2013. The album artwork uses a photograph taken during Dion's previous 2017 tour. The Best So Far... 2018 Tour Edition reached number four in both Australia and New Zealand, and number 24 in Japan.

== Content ==
The album includes Dion's most successful songs from 1993 to 2013, many of which she performed during her Celine Dion Live 2018 tour. It contains Australian number-one singles: "The Power of Love", "Because You Loved Me", and "My Heart Will Go On". Other Australian chart entries include: "Think Twice" (number two), "It's All Coming Back to Me Now" (number eight), "Falling into You" (number 12), "That's the Way It Is" (number 14), "A New Day Has Come" (number 19), "I Drove All Night" (number 22), "Immortality" and "All by Myself" (both peaking at number 38), and "Taking Chances" (number 60). Many of these tracks also charted in New Zealand, including top 10 hits: "Because You Loved Me", "The Power of Love", "That's the Way It Is", and "It's All Coming Back to Me Now". The album also includes the Japanese number-one single "To Love You More".

== Commercial performance ==
The Best So Far... 2018 Tour Edition debuted at number 10 in Australia and became Dion's fourth 'best of' release to enter the ARIA Albums Chart since her first, All the Way... A Decade of Song, in 1999, while her previous compilation was My Love: Essential Collection in 2008. Overall, The Best So Far... 2018 Tour Edition became Dion's ninth top 10 album in Australia since her 1994 release, The Colour of My Love. In its fourth week, the album rose to a new peak of number four. It also topped the ARIA Physical Albums Chart in August 2018. In other markets, The Best So Far... 2018 Tour Edition reached number four in New Zealand and number 24 in Japan. In Japan, it also peaked at number four on the Oricon International Albums Chart.

== Track listing ==
No.	Title	Writer(s)	Producer(s)	Length
1.	"My Heart Will Go On"	James Horner; Will Jennings	Walter Afanasieff; Horner^{[a]}	4:41
2.	"To Love You More" (radio edit)	David Foster; Junior Miles	Foster	4:41
3.	"Immortality" (with the Bee Gees)	Barry Gibb; Robin Gibb; Maurice Gibb	Afanasieff	4:12
4.	"Falling into You"	Billy Steinberg; Rick Nowels; Marie-Claire D'Ubaldo	Nowels; Steinberg	4:20
5.	"The Power of Love" (radio edit)	Gunther Mende; Candy DeRouge; Jennifer Rush; Mary Susan Applegate	Foster	4:48
6.	"It's All Coming Back to Me Now" (radio edit)	Jim Steinman	Steinman; Steven Rinkoff^{[a]}; Roy Bittan^{[a]}	5:32
7.	"That's the Way It Is"	Max Martin; Kristian Lundin; Andreas Carlsson	Martin; Lundin	4:03
8.	"Pour que tu m'aimes encore"	Jean-Jacques Goldman	Goldman; Erick Benzi	4:14
9.	"The First Time Ever I Saw Your Face"	Ewan MacColl	Foster	4:09
10.	"Think Twice"	Andy Hill; Peter Sinfield	Christopher Neil; Aldo Nova^{[b]}	4:49
11.	"Because You Loved Me"	Diane Warren	Foster	4:34
12.	"I Drove All Night"	Steinberg; Tom Kelly	Peer Åström; Vito Luprano	4:00
13.	"A New Day Has Come" (radio remix)	Nova; Stephan Moccio	Ric Wake; Afanasieff; Nova; Richie Jones^{[b]}; S.A.F.^{[b]}	4:21
14.	"Alone"	Steinberg; Kelly	Ben Moody	3:26
15.	"Taking Chances"	Kara DioGuardi; Dave Stewart	John Shanks	4:03
16.	"Loved Me Back to Life"	Hasham Hussain; Denarius Motes; Sia Furler	Sham & Motesart; Hussain^{[c]}	3:52
17.	"All by Myself"	Eric Carmen; Sergei Rachmaninoff	Foster	5:11
Total length:				74:56

=== Notes ===
- ^{^a} signifies a co-producer
- ^{^b} signifies an additional producer
- ^{^c} signifies a vocal producer
- The Japanese edition includes a bonus track, "River Deep, Mountain High".

== Charts ==
=== Weekly charts ===
Weekly chart performance
Chart (2018)	Peak position
Australian Albums (ARIA)	4
Japanese Albums (Oricon)	24
Japanese International Albums (Oricon)	4
Japanese Hot Albums (Billboard Japan)	31
New Zealand Albums (RMNZ)	4

=== Year-end charts ===
Year-end chart performance
Chart (2018)	Position
Australian Albums (ARIA)	86

== Certifications ==
Certifications
Region	Certification	Certified units/sales
New Zealand (RMNZ)	Platinum	15,000^{‡}
^{‡} Sales+streaming figures based on certification alone.

== Release history ==
Release history
Region	Date	Label	Format	Catalog
Japan	30 May 2018	SMEJ	Blu-spec CD2; digital; streaming	SICP-31172
Japan	30 May 2018	SMEJ	Blu-spec CD2 with a handkerchief; digital; streaming	SICP-31170 〜 SICP-31171
Taiwan	1 June 2018	Columbia	CD with a poster and a notebook; digital; streaming	19075842342
Thailand	15 June 2018	Columbia	CD; digital; streaming	19075842342
Australia	6 July 2018	Columbia	CD; digital; streaming	19075842342
New Zealand	20 July 2018	Columbia	CD; digital; streaming	19075842342

== See also ==
- Celine Dion Live 2018
