= Celine Dion Live 2018 =

International concert tour

- Tour by Celine Dion
- Promotional poster for the tour
- Location: Asia; Oceania
- Associated album: The Best So Far... 2018 Tour Edition
- Start date: 26 June 2018
- End date: 14 August 2018
- No. of shows: 22
- Box office: $56.5 million

Celine Dion concert chronology
- Celine Dion Live 2017 (2017); Celine Dion Live 2018 (2018); Courage World Tour (2019–2020)

Celine Dion Live 2018 was the fourteenth concert tour by Canadian singer Celine Dion, staged in support of her greatest hits album The Best So Far... 2018 Tour Edition (2018). It was Dion's first tour in Asia and Oceania since the Taking Chances World Tour in 2008. The tour began on 26 June 2018 in Tokyo, Japan and concluded on 14 August 2018 in Auckland, New Zealand, with 22 concerts in total. All shows were sold out and the tour grossed $56.5 million.

== Background ==
The initial Asia Tour was planned to support the English language album Loved Me Back to Life and was scheduled for October and November 2014. Concerts were planned in Japan, the Philippines, China, Taiwan, South Korea, Malaysia, and Thailand. On 13 August 2014, Dion announced that the tour had been cancelled because of the ongoing illness of her husband and manager, René Angélil, and family matters.

On 10 January 2018, Dion held a press conference at The Colosseum at Caesars Palace in Las Vegas, where she formally announced the new tour. She stated that she would visit Japan, Taiwan, Singapore, Indonesia, Thailand, China, and the Philippines. Apart from Japan and China, it was Dion's first time performing in these countries. On 25 January 2018, a third date in Taipei was added due to strong demand. On 12 February 2018, a second date in Manila was announced.

On 1 February 2018, the Australia and New Zealand leg of the tour was confirmed. On 14 February 2018, additional dates in Sydney, Melbourne, and Auckland were added. On 19 February 2018, an extra show in Brisbane was announced. On 11 March 2018, it was confirmed that Dion would perform a third concert in Auckland on 14 August 2018.

== Critical reception ==
The tour received positive reviews. Nick Bond from news.com.au wrote that Dion was both heartbreaking and hilarious, adding that her unexpected performance of the Australian classic "You're the Voice" defined the Sydney show. He also praised her rendition of "All by Myself", describing it as a moment of raw emotion.

Jade Kops from BroadwayWorld.com noted that although a decade had passed since Dion's previous Sydney appearance, she delivered a show that exceeded expectations. He highlighted her vocal strength and wrote that she balanced the scale of a stadium concert with an unexpectedly intimate atmosphere, sharing stories and music from her more than thirty year career. Kops also singled out Dion's interpretation of Janis Ian's "At Seventeen", performed with a small string ensemble, noting the restraint and clarity she brought to the song.

Jane Armistead from The Sunday Times wrote that Dion "raised the roof" at the Brisbane Entertainment Centre, delivering a succession of major hits. She added that the performance also carried emotional weight, particularly during "Recovering", written for Dion by Pink after Angélil's death in 2016.

Ross McRae from The West Australian awarded the Perth concert four stars and pointed to several standout moments, including "Think Twice" with its rock‑driven arrangement, "All by Myself" with its climactic vocal ending, and a reflective medley of "At Seventeen", "A New Day Has Come", and "Unison". McRae also observed that Dion performs with a corded microphone, a choice that, in his view, reinforces the immediacy of her live vocals.

Michael Lallo from The Age wrote that Dion's lack of concern for trends is part of her appeal. During the Melbourne concert, she performed several covers that she reshaped in her own style, including "It's All Coming Back to Me Now", which showcased the continued power of her voice. Lallo added that the setlist included her signature hits, among them "My Heart Will Go On", and noted that Dion promised to return to Australia sooner than she had in the past.

== Commercial performance ==
Dion concluded the 2018 summer tour with grosses of $56.5 million. Across 22 shows in Asia, Australia, and New Zealand, she sold 259,443 tickets. The largest engagement of the tour was a three night run at Taiwan's Taipei Arena, which grossed more than $10.7 million, while her single concert at the Tokyo Dome drew the highest attendance with 42,748 spectators.

On 12 July 2019, it was announced that Dion's Live 2018 tour had been nominated at the Helpmann Awards for Best International Contemporary Concert.

== Broadcasts and recordings ==
The opening concert of the tour, held in Tokyo, was recorded and broadcast on 25 August 2018. "Falling into You" and "Pour que tu m'aimes encore" were not included in the broadcast. There has been no confirmation regarding a possible CD/DVD release. Dion's performance of "You're the Voice" with John Farnham was also recorded, and part of it aired on Channel Ten's The Project.

== Tour dates ==
List of concerts
| Date (2018) | City | Country | Venue | Opening act | Attendance | Revenue |
|---|---|---|---|---|---|---|
| 26 June | Tokyo | Japan | Tokyo Dome | Véronic DiCaire | 42,748 / 42,748 | $5,784,430 |
| 29 June | Macau | | Cotai Arena | Véronic DiCaire | 19,809 / 19,809 | $4,017,395 |
| 30 June | Macau | | Cotai Arena | Véronic DiCaire | 19,809 / 19,809 | $4,017,395 |
| 3 July | Singapore | | Marina Bay Sands Grand Ballroom | Véronic DiCaire | 12,516 / 12,516 | $4,203,989 |
| 4 July | Singapore | | Marina Bay Sands Grand Ballroom | Véronic DiCaire | 12,516 / 12,516 | $4,203,989 |
| 7 July | Bogor (Note: Promoted as Jakarta) | Indonesia | SICC | Véronic DiCaire | 8,248 / 8,248 | $2,899,348 |
| 11 July | Taipei | Taiwan | Taipei Arena | Véronic DiCaire | 35,765 / 35,765 | $10,702,924 |
| 13 July | Taipei | Taiwan | Taipei Arena | Véronic DiCaire | 35,765 / 35,765 | $10,702,924 |
| 14 July | Taipei | Taiwan | Taipei Arena | Véronic DiCaire | 35,765 / 35,765 | $10,702,924 |
| 19 July | Pasay (Note: Promoted as Manila) | Philippines | Mall of Asia Arena | Véronic DiCaire | 16,373 / 16,373 | $3,956,459 |
| 20 July | Pasay | Philippines | Mall of Asia Arena | Véronic DiCaire | 16,373 / 16,373 | $3,956,459 |
| 23 July | Pak Kret (Note: Promoted as Bangkok) | Thailand | IMPACT Arena | Véronic DiCaire | 10,223 / 10,223 | $2,543,340 |
| 27 July | Sydney | Australia | Qudos Bank Arena | Véronic DiCaire | 27,275 / 27,275 | $6,079,202 |
| 28 July | Sydney | Australia | Qudos Bank Arena | Véronic DiCaire | 27,275 / 27,275 | $6,079,202 |
| 30 July | Brisbane | Australia | Brisbane Entertainment Centre | Véronic DiCaire | 18,055 / 18,055 | $3,782,363 |
| 31 July | Brisbane | Australia | Brisbane Entertainment Centre | Véronic DiCaire | 18,055 / 18,055 | $3,782,363 |
| 4 August | Perth | Australia | Perth Arena | Véronic DiCaire | 13,311 / 13,355 | $2,240,214 |
| 7 August | Melbourne | Australia | Rod Laver Arena | Véronic DiCaire | 24,342 / 24,342 | $4,650,884 |
| 8 August | Melbourne | Australia | Rod Laver Arena | Véronic DiCaire | 24,342 / 24,342 | $4,650,884 |
| 11 August | Auckland | New Zealand | Spark Arena | Véronic DiCaire | 30,778 / 30,778 | $5,616,343 |
| 12 August | Auckland | New Zealand | Spark Arena | Véronic DiCaire | 30,778 / 30,778 | $5,616,343 |
| 14 August | Auckland | New Zealand | Spark Arena | Véronic DiCaire | 30,778 / 30,778 | $5,616,343 |
| Total | | | | | 259,443 / 259,487 | $56,476,891 |

== Band ==
- Scott Price – musical director, piano
- Dominique Messier – drums
- Yves Labont – bass
- Kaven Girouard – guitars
- Guillaume Marchand – keyboards
- Paul Picard – percussion
- Andrea Corr – tin whistle (My Heart Will Go On)
- Barnev Valsaint – background vocals
- Dawn Cumberbatch – background vocals
- Élise Duguay – background vocals
- Philippe Dunnigan – violin
- Jenny Elfving – violin
- Jerome Gordon – viola
- Judy Kang – cello
- Eric Tewalt – woodwinds
- Kendall Louis Armstrong – woodwinds
- Matt Fronke – trumpet
- Kail Graham – trumpet
- Jay Martin – trumpet
- Nathan Tanouye – trombone

== See also ==
- The Best So Far... 2018 Tour Edition
