= List of best-selling singles and albums of 2003 in Ireland =

This is a list of the best-selling singles and best-selling albums in Ireland in 2003.

== Top selling singles ==
1. "We've Got the World" – Mickey Joe Harte
2. "Where Is the Love?" – The Black Eyed Peas
3. "In da Club" – 50 Cent
4. "Ignition (Remix)" – R. Kelly
5. "Mandy" – Westlife
6. "Lose Yourself" – Eminem
7. "A Better Plan" – Simon Casey
8. "White Flag" – Dido
9. "All the Things She Said" – t.A.T.u.
10. "Sound of the Underground" – Girls Aloud

== Top selling albums ==
1. Come Away with Me – Norah Jones
2. Life for Rent – Dido
3. Justified – Justin Timberlake
4. Stripped – Christina Aguilera
5. A Rush of Blood to the Head – Coldplay
6. So Much for the City – The Thrills
7. Dangerously in Love – Beyoncé
8. Get Rich or Die Tryin' – 50 Cent
9. Turnaround – Westlife
10. Let Go – Avril Lavigne

Notes:

- *Compilation albums are not included.

== See also ==
- List of songs that reached number one on the Irish Singles Chart
- List of artists who reached number one in Ireland
