= A Rush of Blood to the Head =

- Standard edition cover

Studio album by Coldplay
- Released: 26 August 2002
- Recorded: 13 September 2001 – July 2002
- Studios: Mayfair (London); AIR (London); Parr Street (Liverpool)
- Genres: Alternative rock; post-Britpop; indie rock; arena rock
- Length: 54:06
- Labels: Parlophone; Capitol
- Producers: Ken Nelson; Coldplay

Coldplay chronology
| Parachutes (2000) | A Rush of Blood to the Head (2002) | Live 2003 (2003) |

Singles from A Rush of Blood to the Head
- 1. "In My Place" Released: 5 August 2002; 2. "The Scientist" Released: 11 November 2002; 3. "Clocks" Released: 17 March 2003 (Note: "Clocks" was first released to US radio on 11 November 2002.); 4. "God Put a Smile upon Your Face" Released: 1 July 2003

A Rush of Blood to the Head is the second studio album by the British rock band Coldplay. It was released on 26 August 2002 by Parlophone in the United Kingdom, and a day later by Capitol in the United States. Recorded after the band achieved global popularity through their debut record, Parachutes (2000), the album features greater use of the electric guitar and piano, with co-production from Ken Nelson.

Supported by the hit singles "In My Place", "The Scientist", and "Clocks", A Rush of Blood to the Head topped the charts of 12 countries and shipped over 17 million copies worldwide, becoming one of the best-selling albums of the 21st century in the UK. The album was critically acclaimed and won numerous accolades, including the Grammy Awards for Best Alternative Album, Best Rock Performance ("In My Place"), and Record of the Year ("Clocks").

Since its release, A Rush of Blood to the Head has appeared on several critics' rankings of the best albums of the decade, the 21st-century, and of all-time. Rolling Stone has placed it on multiple revisions of its "500 Greatest Albums of All Time" list since 2003. Additionally, the Rock and Roll Hall of Fame included it on their 200 Definitive Albums in 2007, and its artwork was one of ten album covers commemorated on a UK postage stamp issued by the Royal Mail in 2010.

== Recording ==
Coldplay started recording A Rush of Blood to the Head in London in September 2001, but later relocated to Liverpool, where they had recorded some of the songs on their debut album Parachutes (2000). Lead singer Chris Martin said that once there they "became obsessed with recording". "In My Place" was among the first songs recorded for the album during this period, and the one that the band released as the album's lead single because it was the song that made them want to do a second album. It kept them going and made them think they could still write songs, following a strange period of not really knowing what they were doing three months after the success of Parachutes.

The opening track "Politik" was recorded two days following 2001's September 11 attacks. According to an interview with lead singer Chris Martin, "I wrote the song on 9/11 and we recorded it on 9/13. We were all, like everyone else, I suppose, a little confused and frightened. I get off tour and had a rest for one or two days. But then I get antsy again. I want to write songs and do things, 'cause you never know what might happen." The band wrote more than twenty songs in the months following for the album and some of those, including "In My Place" and "Animals", were performed live during the tours promoting Parachutes. The album's title was revealed through a post on the band's official website.

During initial recording sessions in Liverpool, Martin and guitarist Jonny Buckland worked alone, and only on weekends. Each Monday, they would present the song ideas that they had developed to their bandmates. With A Rush of Blood to the Head nearly completed, Martin went into the studio late one night and wrote a piano riff that he has stated "just came out". The band recognised that this early version of the song, that would become "Clocks", was special the first time Martin played it to them. Reasoning that it was too late to include the song on the album, they recorded a demo version and included it on a CD marked "Songs for #3", featuring unfinished tracks they intended to work on for their third studio album.

By June 2002, the band had completed A Rush of Blood to the Head, but thought their output sounded "rubbish" and reached an agreement with record label Parlophone to postpone the release of the album until they were completely satisfied. Subsequently, many songs were discarded because they sounded like they could have been on Parachutes. Martin has claimed that it would have been uninteresting: "It would have shown that we're happy to sit back on what we'd done, and we're not. For us, it was important to progress and try to improve upon our abilities as musicians." Such ambitions put the band under strain: "sometimes practice sessions ended abruptly with one or more members of Coldplay threatening to quit".

After headlining the 2002 Glastonbury Festival, Coldplay returned to the studio and worked on some tracks from the "Songs for #3" CD they had produced earlier. Phil Harvey, the band's manager, heard "Clocks" and urged them to rework it immediately: "No, you must do that song now 'cause you're going on [in the lyrics] about urgency, and you're talking about keeping this song back. That doesn't make sense."

== Composition ==
"God Put a Smile upon Your Face"
"God Put a Smile upon Your Face" consists of electric and rhythm guitar.

Production of the album began quickly with the writing of the track "Politik", which was a song seen as a reflection of the world at the time, giving the band a renewed perspective on their lives and society. Many of the song lyrics on the album relate strongly to the theme of urgency. Martin has commented that previous songs were more relaxed since they were in a comfortable state of mind: "Perhaps there's a bit more urgency on some of these songs. And that's born from all the places we've been and the things we've experienced." Martin has explained. In relation to the theme of urgency, Martin has also stated that the album's title means "doing something on impulse".

Several songs on the album are about the themes of love and relationships. These tracks are based on reality, but according to Martin, they were written with a fictional twist: "Songs are like fairy tales: they have a beginning and an end and you can make it all work perfectly. Real life doesn't work like that".

The album includes ballads and acoustic songs featuring extensive use of guitar and piano. The U2-esque "epic rock" of the album's opening track "Politik", the piano-driven "Clocks", the loud guitars of "A Whisper" and the country rock-inspired guitar in "Warning Sign" were seen as an extension of the band's musical range. Chris Martin has also stated that the album's title track is an homage to American singer-songwriter Johnny Cash. The title track is about uncertainties faced in life. According to Martin, the song "Green Eyes" was composed for an "American friend" and guitarist Jonny Buckland. During an interview for Apple Music, drummer Will Champion revealed that "A Whisper" was recorded on a single take, adding that the band never managed to re-record the song or play it live properly after the original session.

== Artwork ==
The album cover for A Rush of Blood to the Head was designed by photographer Sølve Sundsbø. Sundsbø had been hired by fashion magazine Dazed & Confused in the late 1990s to produce a shot with a "technological feel, something all white", according to himself. As an artist, Sundsbø attempted to do a unique original piece, creating a shot that had never been seen before; he suggested taking shots using a three-dimensional scanning machine—used to measure head sizes for USAF fighter jet helmets—to fulfill his vision.

The model for the shots, named Mim, wore all-white cosmetic makeup, along with a coloured twill cape, to aesthetically produce optimal and desired results. The scanner could not properly identify some of the colors on the cape, so they were replaced with digital spikes, and the head in the image was chopped as the machine was unable to scan more than about thirty centimetres in height at a time. At first, Sundsbø had mixed feelings about the image, stating that when he first saw the result, he was terrified. "I thought it was so beautiful, but I was sure the magazine was never going to run it." The editor of the magazine, however, absolutely loved the image, and eventually featured it in one of their publications. After seeing the image in a publication of the magazine, Chris Martin approached Sundsbø for proper permission to use the image as the cover of A Rush of Blood to the Head. For the album's singles, Martin asked Sundsbø for any ideas; Sundsbø suggested scanning the head of each member of the band.

The album booklet contains only two photos; one with Coldplay in a location that was rumoured to be a forest, and one with the band in a recording studio. The album cover was among the ten chosen by the Royal Mail for a set of "Classic Album Cover" postage stamps issued in January 2010.

== Release ==
A Rush of Blood to the Head was released on 26 August 2002 by Parlophone in the United Kingdom, and a day later on 27 August 2002 by Capitol in the United States. The album was completed and originally ready to hand over to record representatives and released in June 2002; however, after recording a demo of "Clocks" intended for the third album, the band delayed release by two months to allow them to work it into a finished track and include it on A Rush of Blood to the Head. Capitol released a remastered version of the album in 2008 on a 180-gram vinyl record as part of its "From the Capitol Vaults" series.

== Critical reception ==
=== Reviews ===
Professional ratings
Aggregate scores
| Source | Rating |
|---|---|
| Metacritic | 80/100 |
Review scores
| Source | Rating |
| AllMusic | 5/5 stars |
| Blender | 4/5 stars |
| Entertainment Weekly | A |
| The Guardian | 4/5 stars |
| NME | 9/10 |
| Pitchfork | 5.1/10 |
| Q | 4/5 stars |
| Rolling Stone | 4/5 stars |
| Spin | 7/10 |
| Uncut | 5/5 stars |

The review aggregating website Metacritic reports a normalised score of 80 out of 100 based on 25 reviews, indicating "generally favorable reviews". This makes A Rush of Blood to the Head Coldplay's highest-scoring album on the website as of 2023. Many reviewers felt that it built upon Parachutes. Alexis Petridis of The Guardian wrote that Coldplay's "new assurance is everywhere ... the timidity of Parachutes is nowhere to be found ... It sounds like an album ready to take on the world, and win." Kelefa Sanneh of The New York Times commented that it is "one of the year's best albums" and describing it as "sparser, stranger and even catchier than its predecessor". Rolling Stone's Rob Sheffield said that "A Rush of Blood to the Head is a nervier, edgier, thoroughly surprising album", adding, "where Parachutes was the clumsy diary of a high-strung kid, A Rush of Blood sounds more like a band with the confidence to test its own limits."

Ted Kessler of NME lauded A Rush of Blood to the Head, calling it "an album of outstanding natural beauty, an organic, wholesome work." MacKenzie Wilson of AllMusic echoed the above comments, saying that it is a "strong album". Wilson, who compliments Martin for his "sharpened" falsetto and refined "haunting delivery" and Buckland for his "riveting guitar work", notes that "regardless of the band still being in their mid-twenties, they've made an amazing record". Emma Pearse of the American newspaper The Village Voice has the same sentiments, stating that it is "a little edgier, trancier, and more conversational" compared to Parachutes. Conversely, Robert Christgau gave the album a one-star honorable mention and wrote: "Let Green Eyes dump him for real and we'll see how long he hums in the void".

=== Rankings ===
In 2012, it was ranked number 466 on Rolling Stone's list of the 500 greatest albums of all time, with its ranking climbing to number 324 in the 2020 update. In 2013, the album topped a BBC Radio poll ahead of Hopes and Fears by Keane, Rio by Duran Duran and The Dark Side of the Moon by Pink Floyd. It was also included in 1001 Albums You Must Hear Before You Die. Billboard listed "Green Eyes" among the best deep cuts from the 21st century.

List of critic rankings
| Publication | Year | Description | Result | Ref. |
|---|---|---|---|---|
| The A.V. Club | 2002 | Best Albums of 2002 | 3 | |
| Billboard | 2002 | Critics' Choice Albums 2002 | 1 | |
| Blender | 2002 | Top 10 Albums of 2002 | 2 | |
| Consequence | 2009 | Top of the Decade Albums | 33 | |
| Entertainment Weekly | 2008 | 100 Best Albums from 1983 to 2008 | 49 | |
| The Guardian | 2007 | 1000 Albums to Hear Before You Die | Placed | |
| Loudwire | 2025 | The Best Alt-Rock Album of Each Year of the 2000s | Placed | |
| Newsweek | 2020 | 100 Best Rock Albums of All Time | 77 | |
| Newsweek | 2021 | 50 Best Rock Albums from the 21st Century | 12 | |
| NME | 2006 | 100 Greatest British Albums Ever | 67 | |
| NME | 2013 | The 500 Greatest Albums of All Time | 266 | |
| NPR | 2009 | The 50 Most Important Recordings of the Decade | Placed | |
| Paste | 2009 | The 50 Best Albums of the 2000s | 33 | |
| PopMatters | 2002 | The Best Albums of 2002 | 3 | |
| Q | 2002 | Recordings of the Year – 2002 | Placed | |
| Q | 2004 | 50 Best British Albums Ever | 19 | |
| Q | 2016 | The Greatest Albums of the Last 30 Years | Placed | |
| Radio X | 2023 | The 25 Best Albums of 2002 | 16 | |
| Rock and Roll Hall of Fame | 2007 | Definitive 200 Albums of All Time | 65 | |
| Rolling Stone | 2002 | Best Albums of 2002 | 3 | |
| Rolling Stone | 2011 | 100 Best Albums of the 2000s | 21 | |
| Rolling Stone | 2023 | The 500 Greatest Albums of All Time | 324 | (Note: The album first appeared at number 473 on the listicle, rising in subsequent editions.) |
| RTÉ Gold | 2023 | Top 100 Greatest Albums | 29 | |
| Spin | 2010 | Top 125 Albums of the Past 25 Years | 107 | |
| Spin | 2014 | The 300 Best Albums of the Past 30 Years | 278 | |
| The Times | 2009 | The 100 Best Pop Albums of the Noughties | 71 | |
| Uncut | 2009 | 150 Greatest Albums of the 21st Century So Far | 131 | |
| Under the Radar | 2009 | Best Albums of the Decade (2000–2009) | 76 | |
| The Village Voice | 2002 | Pazz & Jop Critics Poll | 9 | |
| WXPN | 2021 | All Time Greatest Albums | 249 | |
| Yardbarker | 2023 | Best Alternative Albums of the 21st Century | Placed | |

== Accolades ==
List of awards and nominations
| Year | Ceremony | Category | Result | Ref. |
|---|---|---|---|---|
| 2002 | Bizarre Awards | Best Album | Won | |
| 2002 | Fryderyk Awards | Best Foreign Album | Nominated | |
| 2002 | Gaffa Awards (Denmark) | International Album of the Year | Won | |
| 2002 | MTV Europe Music Awards | Best Album | Nominated | |
| 2002 | Q Awards | Best Album | Won | |
| 2002 | Rockbjörnen Awards | Best International Album | Nominated | |
| 2002 | Top of the Pops Awards | Top Album | Won | |
| 2003 | Brit Awards | British Album of the Year | Won | |
| 2003 | Danish Music Awards | International Album of the Year | Nominated | |
| 2003 | Edison Awards | Best International Group Album | Nominated | |
| 2003 | Grammy Awards | Best Alternative Music Album | Won | |
| 2003 | Hungarian Music Awards | Foreign Modern Rock Album of the Year | Won | |
| 2003 | Mercury Prize | Album of the Year | Nominated | |
| 2003 | NME Awards | Album of the Year | Won | |
| 2003 | NME Awards | Best Album | Won | |
| 2003 | NME Awards | Worst Album | Nominated | |
| 2003 | Premios Oye! | English Album of the Year | Won | |
| 2003 | Sky Arts Awards | Pop Music | Nominated | |
| 2003 | Žebřík Music Awards | Best Foreign Album | 2nd place | |
| 2010 | Brit Awards | British Album – Last 30 Years | Nominated | |

== Commercial performance ==
A Rush of Blood to the Head reached number one in 12 countries. EMI shipped more than two million copies in its first week worldwide. It debuted at number-one on the UK Albums Chart selling 273,924 units. The British Phonographic Industry has since certified it 10× Platinum for 3 million copies. After the release of "Clocks" and "The Scientist", it spent over one year on the chart. In the United Kingdom, it is the seventh-highest-selling album of the 21st century, as published by Music Week. In July 2011, the record climbed from number 176 back to number 44 in the album's 250th week. As of October 2021, it had sold over three million copies in the United Kingdom, making it Coldplay's best-selling album and the 10th-highest-selling of the 21st century.

It spent four consecutive weeks at number one on the European Top 100 Albums chart in 2002. In the United States, A Rush of Blood was Coldplay's first venture into the Top 5, with 140,854 copies sold. It was stronger than its predecessor, Parachutes, which debuted at number 189 in December 2000. A Rush of Blood debuted at number-one on the Canadian Albums Chart, selling 28,200 copies in its first week. The album has been certified quadruple platinum by the Canadian Recording Industry Association for shipments of over 400,000. It has been certified seven-times platinum by the Australian Recording Industry Association for moving over 490,000 copies. In Japan, A Rush of Blood to the Head debuted at number 48 with 6,400 copies sold, rising to number 23 with 13,950 copies a week later.

== Track listing ==
All tracks are written by Coldplay, with co-production from Ken Nelson.

A Rush of Blood to the Head track listing
| No. | Title | Length |
|---|---|---|
| 1. | "Politik" | 5:18 |
| 2. | "In My Place" | 3:48 |
| 3. | "God Put a Smile upon Your Face" | 4:57 |
| 4. | "The Scientist" | 5:09 |
| 5. | "Clocks" | 5:07 |
| 6. | "Daylight" | 5:27 |
| 7. | "Green Eyes" | 3:43 |
| 8. | "Warning Sign" | 5:31 |
| 9. | "A Whisper" | 3:58 |
| 10. | "A Rush of Blood to the Head" | 5:51 |
| 11. | "Amsterdam" | 5:21 |
| Total length: | | 54:06 |

== Personnel ==
Credits adapted from AllMusic.

Coldplay

- Chris Martin – lead vocals, piano, keyboards, acoustic guitar, rhythm guitar (tracks 8–9)
- Jonny Buckland – lead guitar, backing vocals (tracks 1 and 6), acoustic guitar (track 4), twelve-string slide guitar (track 6)
- Guy Berryman – bass guitar
- Will Champion – drums, backing vocals
- Phil Harvey

Technical and additional personnel

- Coldplay – producer, string arranger, mixer, art direction
- Andrea Wright – assistant engineer
- Ann Lines – string performer
- Audrey Riley – string arranger and performer
- Ben Thackeray – assistant engineer
- Blue Source – art direction
- Chris Tombling – string performer
- Dan Green – string performer
- Danton Supple – mixer (track 2, 3, 6, 8, 10)
- George Marino – mastering
- Jon Bailey – assistant engineer
- Jon Withnal – assistant engineer
- Ken Nelson – producer, engineer, mixer
- Laura Melhewish – string performer
- Leo Payne – string performer
- Mark Phythian – additional production, mixer
- Peter Lale – string performer
- Richard George – string performer
- Rik Simpson – additional engineering
- Sølve Sundsbø – cover art
- Susan Dench – string performer
- Tom Sheehan – photographer
- Zed Nelson – photographer

== Charts ==
=== Weekly charts ===
Weekly chart performance
| Chart (2002–2025) | Peak position |
|---|---|
| Argentine Albums (CAPIF) | 2 |
| Australian Albums (ARIA) | 1 |
| Austrian Albums (Ö3 Austria) | 10 |
| Belgian Albums (Ultratop Flanders) | 3 |
| Belgian Albums (Ultratop Wallonia) | 2 |
| Canadian Albums (Billboard) | 1 |
| Croatian International Albums (HDU) | 36 |
| Czech Albums (ČNS IFPI) | 37 |
| Danish Albums (Hitlisten) | 1 |
| Dutch Albums (Album Top 100) | 3 |
| European Albums (Music & Media) | 1 |
| Finnish Albums (Suomen virallinen lista) | 2 |
| French Albums (SNEP) | 4 |
| German Albums (Offizielle Top 100) | 1 |
| Greek Albums (IFPI) | 2 |
| Hong Kong Albums (HKRMA) | 1 |
| Hungarian Albums (MAHASZ) | 31 |
| Icelandic Albums (Tónlistinn) | 1 |
| Irish Albums (IRMA) | 1 |
| Italian Albums (FIMI) | 1 |
| Japanese Albums (Oricon) | 23 |
| Mexican Albums (Top 100 Mexico) | 38 |
| New Zealand Albums (RMNZ) | 2 |
| Norwegian Albums (VG-lista) | 1 |
| Norwegian Rock Albums (IFPI Norge) | 7 |
| Polish Albums (ZPAV) | 25 |
| Portuguese Albums (AFP) | 3 |
| Scottish Albums (Official Charts) | 1 |
| Singaporean Albums (RIAS) | 7 |
| South Korean Albums (Gaon) | 89 |
| South Korean International Albums (Gaon) | 10 |
| Spanish Albums (AFYVE) | 9 |
| Swedish Albums (Sverigetopplistan) | 5 |
| Swiss Albums (Schweizer Hitparade) | 1 |
| Emirati Albums (IFPI) | 1 |
| UK Albums (Official Charts) | 1 |
| US Billboard 200 | 5 |
| US Top Catalog Albums (Billboard) | 1 |

=== Monthly charts ===
Monthly chart performance
| Chart (2002–2007) | Peak position |
|---|---|
| Argentine Albums (CAPIF) | 8 |
| South Korean International Albums (RIAK) | 12 |
| Uruguayan Albums (CUD) | 4 |

=== Year-end charts ===
Year-end chart performance
| Chart (2002) | Position |
|---|---|
| Australian Albums (ARIA) | 48 |
| Belgian Albums (Ultratop Flanders) | 15 |
| Belgian Alternative Albums (Ultratop Flanders) | 8 |
| Belgian Albums (Ultratop Wallonia) | 31 |
| Canadian Albums (Nielsen SoundScan) | 35 |
| Canadian Alternative Albums (Nielsen SoundScan) | 10 |
| Danish Albums (Hitlisten) | 33 |
| Dutch Albums (Album Top 100) | 31 |
| European Albums (Music & Media) | 14 |
| French Albums (SNEP) | 73 |
| German Albums (Offizielle Top 100) | 64 |
| Irish Albums (IRMA) | 1 |
| Italian Albums (FIMI) | 31 |
| New Zealand Albums (RMNZ) | 43 |
| Swedish Albums (Sverigetopplistan) | 88 |
| Swiss Albums (Schweizer Hitparade) | 42 |
| UK Albums (OCC) | 4 |
| US Billboard 200 | 140 |
| Worldwide Albums (IFPI) | 24 |

| Chart (2003) | Position |
|---|---|
| Australian Albums (ARIA) | 10 |
| Austrian Albums (Ö3 Austria) | 72 |
| Belgian Albums (Ultratop Flanders) | 7 |
| Belgian Alternative Albums (Ultratop Flanders) | 3 |
| Belgian Albums (Ultratop Wallonia) | 26 |
| Danish Albums (Hitlisten) | 58 |
| Dutch Albums (Album Top 100) | 6 |
| European Albums (Billboard) | 8 |
| French Albums (SNEP) | 83 |
| German Albums (Offizielle Top 100) | 17 |
| Irish Albums (IRMA) | 7 |
| Italian Albums (FIMI) | 54 |
| New Zealand Albums (RMNZ) | 3 |
| Swiss Albums (Schweizer Hitparade) | 32 |
| UK Albums (OCC) | 7 |
| US Billboard 200 | 17 |
| Worldwide Albums (IFPI) | 6 |

| Chart (2004) | Position |
|---|---|
| Australian Albums (ARIA) | 31 |
| Belgian Albums (Ultratop Flanders) | 46 |
| Belgian Alternative Albums (Ultratop Flanders) | 27 |
| Dutch Albums (Album Top 100) | 77 |
| UK Albums (OCC) | 85 |
| US Billboard 200 | 76 |

| Chart (2005) | Position |
|---|---|
| Belgian Albums (Ultratop Flanders) | 51 |
| Belgian Alternative Albums (Ultratop Flanders) | 37 |
| UK Albums (OCC) | 103 |
| US Catalog Albums (Billboard) | 9 |

| Chart (2006) | Position |
|---|---|
| US Catalog Albums (Billboard) | 23 |

| Chart (2007) | Position |
|---|---|
| Belgian Midprice Albums (Ultratop Flanders) | 21 |
| Belgian Midprice Albums (Ultratop Wallonia) | 35 |

| Chart (2008) | Position |
|---|---|
| Belgian Midprice Albums (Ultratop Flanders) | 39 |
| Belgian Midprice Albums (Ultratop Wallonia) | 30 |

| Chart (2014) | Position |
|---|---|
| South Korean International Albums (Gaon) | 84 |

| Chart (2023) | Position |
|---|---|
| Dutch Albums (Album Top 100) | 79 |

| Chart (2025) | Position |
|---|---|
| Dutch Albums (Album Top 100) | 60 |
| Icelandic Albums (Tónlistinn) | 93 |

=== Decade-end charts ===
Decade-end chart performance
| Chart (2000–2009) | Position |
|---|---|
| Australian Albums (ARIA) | 19 |
| Dutch Albums (Album Top 100) | 34 |
| UK Albums (OCC) | 8 |
| US Billboard 200 | 88 |

== Certifications and sales ==
Certifications and sales
| Region | Certification | Certified units/sales |
|---|---|---|
| Argentina (CAPIF) | 3× Platinum | 120,000^{^} |
| Australia (ARIA) | 7× Platinum | 490,000^{^} |
| Austria (IFPI Austria) | Platinum | 30,000^{*} |
| Belgium (BRMA) | 2× Platinum | 100,000^{*} |
| Brazil (Pro-Música Brasil) | Gold | 60,000 (Note: Brazilian total sales for A Rush of Blood to the Head as of July 2003.) |
| Canada (Music Canada) | 4× Platinum | 400,000^{^} |
| Denmark (IFPI Danmark) | 6× Platinum | 120,000^{‡} |
| Finland (Musiikkituottajat) | Gold | 16,708 (Note: Finnish total sales for A Rush of Blood to the Head as of December 2003.) |
| France (SNEP) | 2× Gold | 200,000^{*} |
| Germany (BVMI) | 2× Platinum | 600,000^{‡} |
| Greece (IFPI Greece) | Gold | 15,000^{^} |
| Iceland | — | 6,300 (Note: Icelandic total sales for A Rush of Blood to the Head as of July 2005.) |
| Italy | — | 120,000 (Note: Italian total sales for A Rush of Blood to the Head as of April 2003.) |
| Italy (FIMI) Sales since 2009 | 2× Platinum | 100,000^{‡} |
| Japan (RIAJ) | Gold | 100,000^{^} |
| Mexico (AMPROFON) | Platinum | 150,000^{^} |
| Netherlands (NVPI) | Platinum | 80,000^{^} |
| New Zealand (RMNZ) | 5× Platinum | 90,000 (Note: New Zealand total sales for A Rush of Blood to the Head as of October 2012.) |
| Norway | — | 41,000 (Note: Norwegian year-end sales for A Rush of Blood to the Head in 2002.) |
| Philippines | — | 140,000 (Note: Filipino total sales for A Rush of Blood to the Head as of November 2002.) |
| Portugal (AFP) | Gold | 20,000^{^} |
| Singapore (RIAS) | Gold | 5,000^{*} |
| South Korea | — | 7,492 (Note: South Korean combined physical sales for A Rush of Blood to the Head based on September 2002 and year-end 2014.) |
| Spain (Promusicae) | Gold | 50,000^{^} |
| Sweden (GLF) | Gold | 30,000^{^} |
| Switzerland (IFPI Switzerland) | Gold | 20,000^{^} |
| United Kingdom (BPI) | 10× Platinum | 3,031,882 (Note: British total sales for A Rush of Blood to the Head as of August 2022.) |
| United States (RIAA) | 4× Platinum | 4,925,000 (Note: American total sales for A Rush of Blood to the Head as of June 2014.) |
Summaries
| Europe (IFPI) | 5× Platinum | 5,000,000^{*} |
^{*} Sales figures based on certification alone.^{^} Shipments figures based on certification alone.^{‡} Sales+streaming figures based on certification alone.

== See also ==
- 2002 in British music
- List of fastest-selling albums
- List of best-selling albums in Belgium
- List of best-selling albums in Europe
- List of best-selling albums in the United Kingdom
- List of best-selling albums of 2002 in Ireland
- List of best-selling albums of 2003 in Ireland
- List of number-one albums in Hong Kong
- List of number-one albums in Norway
- List of number-one albums of 2002 (Australia)
- List of number-one albums of 2002 (Canada)
- List of number-one hits of 2002 (Europe)
- List of number-one hits of 2002 (Germany)
- List of number-one hits of 2002 (Italy)
- List of number-one hits of 2002 (Switzerland)
- List of number-one albums from the 2000s (Denmark)
- List of UK Albums Chart number ones of the 2000s

== Bibliography ==
- Roach, Martin (2003). Coldplay: Nobody Said it was Easy. Omnibus. ISBN 0-7119-9810-8.
