= List of European number-one hits of 2002 =

This is a list of the European Music & Media magazine's European Hot 100 Singles and European Top 100 Albums number-ones of 2002.

Issue date	Song	Artist	Album	Artist
5 January	"Can't Get You Out of My Head"	Kylie Minogue	Swing When You're Winning	Robbie Williams
12 January	"Can't Get You Out of My Head"	Kylie Minogue	Swing When You're Winning	Robbie Williams
19 January	"Can't Get You Out of My Head"	Kylie Minogue	Swing When You're Winning	Robbie Williams
26 January	"Somethin' Stupid"	Robbie Williams & Nicole Kidman	Swing When You're Winning	Robbie Williams
2 February	"Somethin' Stupid"	Robbie Williams & Nicole Kidman	Swing When You're Winning	Robbie Williams
9 February	"Get the Party Started"	Pink	Swing When You're Winning	Robbie Williams
16 February	"Get the Party Started"	Pink	Freak Of Nature	Anastacia
23 February	"Get the Party Started"	Pink	Freak Of Nature	Anastacia
2 March	"Get the Party Started"	Pink	Swing When You're Winning	Robbie Williams
9 March	"Whenever, Wherever"	Shakira	Freak Of Nature	Anastacia
16 March	"Whenever, Wherever"	Shakira	Under Rug Swept	Alanis Morissette
23 March	"Whenever, Wherever"	Shakira	Under Rug Swept	Alanis Morissette
30 March	"Whenever, Wherever"	Shakira	Laundry Service	Shakira
6 April	"Whenever, Wherever"	Shakira	Laundry Service	Shakira
13 April	"Whenever, Wherever"	Shakira	A New Day Has Come	Celine Dion
20 April	"Whenever, Wherever"	Shakira	A New Day Has Come	Celine Dion
27 April	"Whenever, Wherever"	Shakira	A New Day Has Come	Celine Dion
4 May	"Whenever, Wherever"	Shakira	A New Day Has Come	Celine Dion
11 May	"Whenever, Wherever"	Shakira	A New Day Has Come	Celine Dion
18 May	"Whenever, Wherever"	Shakira	A New Day Has Come	Celine Dion
25 May	"Whenever, Wherever"	Shakira	A New Day Has Come	Celine Dion
1 June	"Whenever, Wherever"	Shakira	18	Moby
8 June	"Without Me"	Eminem	18	Moby
15 June	"Without Me"	Eminem	The Eminem Show	Eminem
22 June	"Without Me"	Eminem	The Eminem Show	Eminem
29 June	"Without Me"	Eminem	The Eminem Show	Eminem
6 July	"Without Me"	Eminem	The Eminem Show	Eminem
13 July	"Without Me"	Eminem	The Eminem Show	Eminem
20 July	"Without Me"	Eminem	The Eminem Show	Eminem
27 July	"Without Me"	Eminem	By the Way	Red Hot Chili Peppers
3 August	"Without Me"	Eminem	By the Way	Red Hot Chili Peppers
10 August	"Without Me"	Eminem	By the Way	Red Hot Chili Peppers
17 August	"Without Me"	Eminem	By the Way	Red Hot Chili Peppers
24 August	"Without Me"	Eminem	The Rising	Bruce Springsteen
31 August	"Without Me"	Eminem	By the Way	Red Hot Chili Peppers
7 September	"Without Me"	Eminem	By the Way	Red Hot Chili Peppers
14 September	"Without Me"	Eminem	A Rush of Blood to the Head	Coldplay
21 September	"The Ketchup Song (Asereje)"	Las Ketchup	A Rush of Blood to the Head	Coldplay
28 September	"The Ketchup Song (Asereje)"	Las Ketchup	A Rush of Blood to the Head	Coldplay
5 October	"The Ketchup Song (Asereje)"	Las Ketchup	A Rush of Blood to the Head	Coldplay
12 October	"The Ketchup Song (Asereje)"	Las Ketchup	Bounce	Bon Jovi
19 October	"The Ketchup Song (Asereje)"	Las Ketchup	ELV1S	Elvis Presley
26 October	"The Ketchup Song (Asereje)"	Las Ketchup	ELV1S	Elvis Presley
2 November	"The Ketchup Song (Asereje)"	Las Ketchup	ELV1S	Elvis Presley
9 November	"The Ketchup Song (Asereje)"	Las Ketchup	Forty Licks	The Rolling Stones
16 November	"The Ketchup Song (Asereje)"	Las Ketchup	Shaman	Santana
23 November	"The Ketchup Song (Asereje)"	Las Ketchup	The Best of 1990-2000	U2
30 November	"The Ketchup Song (Asereje)"	Las Ketchup	The Best of 1990-2000	U2
7 December	"The Ketchup Song (Asereje)"	Las Ketchup	Escapology	Robbie Williams
14 December	"The Ketchup Song (Asereje)"	Las Ketchup	Escapology	Robbie Williams
21 December	"The Ketchup Song (Asereje)"	Las Ketchup	Escapology	Robbie Williams
28 December	"The Ketchup Song (Asereje)"	Las Ketchup	Escapology	Robbie Williams

== See also ==
- 2002 in music
- List of number-one hits in Europe
