= List of number-one albums of 2002 (Canada) =

These are the Canadian number-one albums of 2002. The chart is compiled by Nielsen Soundscan and published by Jam! Canoe, issued every Sunday. The chart also appears in Billboard magazine as Top Canadian Albums.

Issue date	Album	Artist
January 5	Big Shiny Tunes 6	Various Artists
January 12	Big Shiny Tunes 6	Various Artists
January 19	MuchDance 2002	Various Artists
January 26	Big Shiny Tunes 6	Various Artists
February 2	MuchDance 2002	Various Artists
February 9	Drive	Alan Jackson
February 16	Silver Side Up	Nickelback
February 23	Silver Side Up	Nickelback
March 2	2002 Grammy Nominees	Various Artists
March 9	Sea of No Cares	Great Big Sea
March 16	Under Rug Swept	Alanis Morissette
March 23	Under Rug Swept	Alanis Morissette
March 30	The Way I Feel	Remy Shand
April 6	Laundry Service	Shakira
April 13	A New Day Has Come	Céline Dion
April 20	A New Day Has Come	Céline Dion
April 27	A New Day Has Come	Céline Dion
May 4	A New Day Has Come	Céline Dion
May 11	A New Day Has Come	Céline Dion
May 18	A New Day Has Come	Céline Dion
May 25	A New Day Has Come	Céline Dion
June 1	18	Moby
June 8	Mended	Marc Anthony
June 15	The Eminem Show	Eminem
June 22	The Eminem Show	Eminem
June 29	The Eminem Show	Eminem
July 6	The Eminem Show	Eminem
July 13	The Eminem Show	Eminem
July 20	The Eminem Show	Eminem
July 27	By the Way	Red Hot Chili Peppers
August 3	Busted Stuff	Dave Matthews Band
August 10	The Eminem Show	Eminem
August 17	The Rising	Bruce Springsteen
August 24	The Eminem Show	Eminem
August 31	The Eminem Show	Eminem
September 7	Now! 7	Various Artists
September 14	A Rush of Blood to the Head	Coldplay
September 21	Now! 7	Various Artists
September 28	Let Go	Avril Lavigne
October 5	Let Go	Avril Lavigne
October 12	ELV1S: 30 #1 Hits	Elvis Presley
October 19	ELV1S: 30 #1 Hits	Elvis Presley
October 26	ELV1S: 30 #1 Hits	Elvis Presley
November 2	ELV1S: 30 #1 Hits	Elvis Presley
November 9	ELV1S: 30 #1 Hits	Elvis Presley
November 16	8 Mile	Soundtrack
November 23	The Best of 1990-2000	U2
November 30	8 Mile	Soundtrack
December 7	Up!	Shania Twain
December 14	Up!	Shania Twain
December 21	Up!	Shania Twain
December 28	Up!	Shania Twain

== See also ==
- List of Canadian number-one singles of 2002
