= List of best-selling singles and albums of 2002 in Ireland =

This is a list of the top selling singles and top selling albums in Ireland in 2002.

== Top selling singles ==
1. "There's A Whole Lot Of Loving Going On" – Six
2. "Hero" – Enrique Iglesias
3. "The Ketchup Song (Aserejé)" – Las Ketchup
4. "Whenever, Wherever" – Shakira
5. "Dilemma" – Nelly featuring Kelly Rowland
6. "The Logical Song" – Scooter
7. "Without Me" – Eminem
8. "How You Remind Me" – Nickelback
9. "Anything Is Possible/Evergreen" – Will Young
10. "La Passion" – Gigi D'Agostino

== Top selling albums ==
1. A Rush of Blood to the Head – Coldplay
2. Missundaztood – Pink
3. The Best of 1990-2000 – U2
4. By the Way – Red Hot Chili Peppers
5. Unbreakable – The Greatest Hits Vol. 1 – Westlife
6. Laundry Service – Shakira
7. The Eminem Show – Eminem
8. Escapology – Robbie Williams
9. Escape – Enrique Iglesias
10. A New Day At Midnight - David Gray

Notes:

- *Compilation albums that are composed of Various Artists are not included.

== See also ==
- List of songs that reached number one on the Irish Singles Chart
- List of artists who reached number one in Ireland

== Resources ==
- IRMA Official Site
