= A New Day Has Come =

Studio album by Celine Dion
- Released: 25 March 2002
- Recorded: 28 August 2001 – 31 January 2002
- Studios: Bananaboat (Burbank); Chartmaker, Sony Scoring, The Enterprise II, TODD-AO, Westlake Audio (Los Angeles); Cove City Sound (Glen Cove); Deutsches Filmorchester (Berlin); Endeavour (Suresnes); Maison De Musique, Sony Oasis (Canada); Master Plan, Murlyn, SR 2, The Location (Stockholm); Metropolis (London); Paradise Sound (Florida); Piccolo (Montreal); Sony Music (New York); The Hit Factory (Miami); WallyWorld (California)
- Genre: Pop
- Length: 72:14
- Labels: Columbia; Epic
- Producers: Walter Afanasieff; Peer Åström; Anders Bagge; Arnthor Birgisson; Andreas Carlsson; Simon Franglen; Humberto Gatica; Robert John "Mutt" Lange; Kristian Lundin; Vito Luprano; Steve Morales; Christopher Neil; Aldo Nova; Gérald de Palmas; Guy Roche; Ric Wake

Celine Dion chronology
The Collector's Series, Volume One (2000)	A New Day Has Come (2002)	One Heart (2003)

Singles from A New Day Has Come
- 1. "A New Day Has Come" Released: 11 March 2002; 2. "I'm Alive" Released: 5 August 2002; 3. "Goodbye's (The Saddest Word)" Released: 25 November 2002

A New Day Has Come is the eighteenth studio album and seventh English-language album by Canadian singer Celine Dion. It was released by Columbia Records and Epic Records on 25 March 2002. The album marked her return to recording after a two-year break that followed the birth of her first child in 2001. For the project, Dion worked with a wide range of producers, including Anders Bagge and Peer Åström for the first time.

The album received mixed critical reception. Some reviewers considered it a stylistic shift for Dion, while others described the material as lacking distinction. Commercially, A New Day Has Come was successful, reaching number one in more than 17 countries. In the United States, it sold 3.3 million copies and was certified triple platinum by the RIAA. In Canada, it was certified six times platinum for shipments of 600,000 units. The IFPI awarded it triple platinum for sales of three million copies across Europe. Worldwide sales stand at about 12 million copies, placing it among the best-selling albums of the 21st century.

The lead single, "A New Day Has Come", was released in March 2002 and reached the top 10 in Canada and several European markets. In the United States, it peaked at number 22 on the Billboard Hot 100 and set a record on the Hot Adult Contemporary Tracks chart by remaining at number one for 21 weeks. The second single, "I'm Alive", issued in August 2002, also achieved top-10 positions in many European countries. The final commercial single, "Goodbye's (The Saddest Word)", released in November 2002, saw moderate chart success and entered the top 40 in parts of Europe.

== Background ==
After the farewell millennium concert on 31 December 1999 in Montreal, Dion took a two‑year break from public life to focus on her family. On 25 January 2001, she gave birth to her first son, René‑Charles Angélil. She made a few public appearances during this period, including on 21 September 2001, when she performed a live rendition of "God Bless America" at the America: A Tribute to Heroes telethon honoring victims of the September 11 attacks, and on 28 September at Montreal's companion fund‑raiser, A Show for Life, where she sang "L'amour existe encore".

According to Dion, the album title A New Day Has Come reflected a new chapter in her life and career. She stated that she was deeply affected by the events of 11 September and wanted the album's lyrics to serve as a reminder of the tragedy. Dion also struggled to determine an appropriate image for the album cover, feeling that a portrait celebrating her personal happiness would be in poor taste. She suggested to Sony Music that the cover omit her photograph. After discussion, the photo shoot for A New Day Has Come took place in Montreal in late December 2001 with photographer Melvin Sokolsky. On 30 and 31 January 2002, another photo session was held in Florida, on a beach near Dion's home, with photographer Patrick Demarchelier. The Demarchelier‑shot album cover for A New Day Has Come was released on 28 February 2002.

René Angélil, Dion, and Sony staff selected potential songs at the beginning of 2001. On 28 August 2001, she began recording vocal tracks for nearly two dozen songs at Montreal's Piccolo Studios. Because Dion did not want to leave her seven‑month‑old baby, the album's collaborators traveled to Montreal. The album was scheduled for international release on 25 March 2002 and for release in North America on 26 March 2002.

== Content ==
Most of the album's producers had previously worked with Dion, including Walter Afanasieff, Kristian Lundin, Andreas Carlsson, Christopher Neil, Guy Roche, Robert John "Mutt" Lange, Ric Wake, Aldo Nova, Simon Franglen, and Humberto Gatica. New collaborators included Swedish musicians Anders Bagge, Peer Åström, and Arnthor Birgisson, French singer Gérald de Palmas, and US producer Steve Morales. A New Day Has Come presents Dion's recurring themes of love and hope. It includes ballads, several uptempo pop tracks, and two standards. The North American edition contains 16 tracks, while the international editions include 17, adding "Super Love".

The album's title track, "A New Day Has Come", reflects the birth of Dion's child and was intended to encourage listeners to find renewed strength in their own challenges. Other songs include "I'm Alive", written by the same team behind "That's the Way It Is"; "I Surrender", the album's central ballad; "Sorry for Love", a dance track written and produced by the Swedish team and co-written by Kara DioGuardi; "Have You Ever Been in Love", a power ballad also written and produced by Bagge and Åström; "Goodbye's (The Saddest Word)", an emotional ballad about the loss of a mother, which Dion had first heard three years earlier but declined at the time; "Nature Boy", a 1947 song popularized by Nat King Cole, performed with only piano accompaniment after the originally planned orchestration was not added; "At Last", a gospel‑tinged number first recorded by Glenn Miller in 1941; "Ten Days", a rock‑influenced adaptation of "Tomber" (2000) by Gérald de Palmas, recorded at the last minute after Dion heard the French original; "The Greatest Reward", an adaptation of "L'envie d'aimer" (2000) from the French musical Les Dix Commandements, originally performed by Daniel Lévi; and "Aun Existe Amor", a Spanish‑language version of Dion's French song "L'amour existe encore".

=== Special editions ===
On 11 November 2002 in Europe, and 19 November 2002 in North America, Sony Music released a limited edition of A New Day Has Come. It includes the original album and a bonus DVD featuring the "I'm Alive" video, a preview of Dion's Las Vegas show A New Day..., and two previously unreleased tracks, "Coulda Woulda Shoulda" and "All Because of You". The North American limited edition includes an extended version of "The Greatest Reward", running 4:04 instead of the original 3:28. On 29 January 2008, Legacy Recordings released a collector's edition of A New Day Has Come with a bonus DVD. The CD contains the 16 tracks from the North American edition, including the extended version of "The Greatest Reward", and the DVD includes four music videos and behind‑the‑scenes footage from the making of the album and the "A New Day Has Come" video.

== Singles ==
The first single, "A New Day Has Come", premiered on radio on 6 February 2002. The music video was filmed in mid-February 2002 in West Palm Beach, Florida and directed by Dave Meyers. It premiered on 13 March 2002, coinciding with the international release of the CD single. "A New Day Has Come" became a top 10 hit in Canada and across Europe, reaching number seven in the United Kingdom. In the United States, it was released as an airplay-only single and peaked at number 22 on the Billboard Hot 100. On the US Hot Adult Contemporary Tracks, it set a record by spending 21 weeks at number one.

Also directed by Meyers, the music video for the next single, "I'm Alive", was filmed in late May 2002 in Los Angeles. The song was sent to radio on 7 June 2002. Two remixes premiered at the same time: the Humberto Gatica mix and the wake up mix. The music video debuted on 27 June 2002. "I'm Alive" was included on the soundtrack for Stuart Little 2, and the CD single was released in early August 2002 in Europe, Australia, and Canada. The song reached the top 10 in several European countries and peaked at number two on the European Hot 100 Singles. In the United States, it reached number six on the Hot Adult Contemporary Tracks.

The third and final commercial single, "Goodbye's (The Saddest Word)", was released to radio on 10 October 2002. The music video was filmed at the Château d'Aunoy in France in mid-October 2002 and directed by Chris Applebaum. It premiered on 21 November 2002, accompanied by the European release of the CD single, which reached the top 40 in several countries. In the United States, it peaked at number 27 on the Hot Adult Contemporary Tracks.

Sony Music also issued two US promotional singles: "Aun Existe Amor" and "At Last". "Aun Existe Amor" was released after Dion performed the song at the Billboard Latin Music Awards in May 2002, where she received a special award for "My Heart Will Go On", the first English-language song to top the Billboard Hot Latin Tracks chart. "At Last" was sent to adult contemporary radio in December 2002 and peaked at number 16 on the Hot Adult Contemporary Tracks.

Although unchanged, "Have You Ever Been in Love" was also included on Dion's next album, One Heart, and released as a single in April 2003. The song spent 14 weeks at number two on the Hot Adult Contemporary Tracks in the United States.

== Promotion ==
Dion actively promoted the album through numerous television appearances and concerts. Her A New Day Has Come television special was taped on 3 March 2002 at the Kodak Theatre in Los Angeles and aired on CBS on 7 April 2002. During the broadcast, Dion performed "A New Day Has Come", "I'm Alive", "At Last", "Have You Ever Been in Love", "Nature Boy", and a movie medley that included "Because You Loved Me", "Beauty and the Beast" in duet with Brian McKnight, and "My Heart Will Go On". She also performed "Aun Existe Amor" and "Goodbye's (The Saddest Word)", although these were not aired. Destiny's Child joined her for a medley of "Emotion"/"When the Wrong One Loves You Right".

On 17 March 2002, Dion taped La spéciale Céline Dion in Paris, France, to promote the album in Francophone markets. The special aired on 30 March 2002 on TF1. She performed "A New Day Has Come", "Pour que tu m'aimes encore" in duet with Jean-Jacques Goldman, "Sous le vent" in duet with Garou, "Au bout de mes rêves" with Garou, Pascal Obispo, Gérald de Palmas, and Jean-Jacques Goldman, "Ten Days" in duet with Gérald de Palmas, "I'm Alive", "On ne change pas", and "The Greatest Reward".

Dion, along with Cher, Mary J. Blige, Shakira, and the Dixie Chicks, headlined VH1 Divas Las Vegas, hosted by Ellen DeGeneres at the MGM Grand Las Vegas. The concert was broadcast live on VH1 on 23 May 2002 to benefit the VH1 Save The Music Foundation, a non-profit organization supporting music and education programs in schools. Guest performers included Anastacia, Stevie Nicks, Cyndi Lauper, and Whitney Houston. Dion opened the show with a duet with Anastacia on the AC/DC hit "You Shook Me All Night Long". She later performed "A New Day Has Come" and "I'm Alive". For the finale, the performers presented an Elvis Presley medley, with Dion singing "Can't Help Falling in Love". The concert was released on CD and DVD in October 2002.

On 14 September 2002, Dion performed at the charity Concert for World Children's Day at the Arie Crown Theater in Chicago, under the musical direction of David Foster. The event was broadcast on ABC on 14 November 2002. She performed "That's the Way It Is", "My Heart Will Go On", "The Prayer" in duet with Josh Groban, and "Goodbye's (The Saddest Word)". For the finale, she joined other artists to perform "Aren't They All Our Children". The concert was released on DVD in December 2002.

On 10 October 2002, Dion taped her second Francophone television special, Céline Dion à tout prix, in Paris. She performed "I'm Alive", "Pour que tu m'aimes encore", "L'envie d'aimer" in duet with Daniel Lévi, and a "Ten Days"/"Tomber" medley with Gérald de Palmas. She also performed "Woman in Love" in duet with Natasha St-Pier and joined Lââm for "Stayin' Alive". The special aired on 22 November 2002 on M6.

== Critical reception ==
Professional ratings
Review scores
Source	Rating
AllMusic	3.5/5 stars
Entertainment.ie	1/5 stars
Entertainment Weekly	B−
The Guardian	2/5 stars
New York Post	2.5/4 stars
Rolling Stone	2/5 stars
Slant Magazine	3/5 stars
Toronto Sun	3/5 stars

A New Day Has Come received mixed reviews from music critics, though many praised its stylistic breadth and vocal performances. Writing for Billboard, Chuck Taylor described the album as Dion's most "versatile and gratifying" work to date, noting that it explored a broader and more adventurous range of pop styles than her previous releases. He also commended several tracks individually, calling the title song "a gentle exhale against the world's ills", praising "I'm Alive" for its energetic production and "sky-grazing vocal", and describing "Goodbye's (The Saddest Word)" as "devastatingly beautiful", despite expressing doubts about its commercial appeal. Fellow Billboard critic Larry Flick similarly highlighted "Have You Ever Been in Love", characterizing it as "a warm source of comfort." Stephen Thomas Erlewine of AllMusic also responded positively, describing the album as well-crafted and "savvily sequenced." Although he felt it lacked truly standout songs, he argued that it covered more stylistic territory than any previous Dion album while remaining accessible to her mainstream audience, ultimately deeming it "more ambitious than it needs to be." Mike Ross of Jam! likewise praised the record, writing that it "picks up where Falling into You left off." He highlighted its blend of melodrama, grand balladry, and contemporary production touches, singling out "Goodbye's (The Saddest Word)" for its dramatic key changes and sweeping orchestration.

Other reviewers viewed the album more cautiously. Jane Stevenson of the Toronto Sun observed that Dion's return after a two-year hiatus found her in familiar musical territory, relying on longtime collaborators and emphasizing polished ballads and adult contemporary material. While she praised the rock-oriented "Ten Days", the dance-pop track "Sorry for Love", and Dion's renditions of "At Last" and "Nature Boy", Stevenson concluded that the album took few musical risks, suggesting that its conservative approach would nevertheless appeal to Dion's established fan base. Sal Cinquemani of Slant Magazine praised the adult contemporary material, but was less impressed by the album's attempts at contemporary pop. In one of the more critical reviews, Ken Tucker of Entertainment Weekly argued that its elaborate production often overwhelmed Dion's performances and lyrical themes of innocence and motherhood. Nevertheless, he praised several songs. Writing for Rolling Stone, Rob Sheffield criticized the album's musical direction and Dion's vocal style, describing her voice as ill-suited to standards such as "At Last" and "Nature Boy" and arguing that she lacked the interpretive qualities associated with the songs' original performers. However, he acknowledged the restraint shown in the album's thematic focus. Caroline Sullivan from The Guardian criticized the album's perceived excess and sentimentality, arguing that Dion's tendency toward bombast dominated the record. She characterized the album as an hour-long succession of grandiose love songs and weather-themed metaphors, ultimately describing it as "stunning, in its own bulldozing way."

== Commercial reception ==
A New Day Has Come debuted at number one in 17 countries worldwide. In the United States, Dion achieved two career milestones with the album's debut. It became her first release to enter the Billboard 200 at number one – her fourth chart‑topper overall – and it set a personal best for first‑week sales with 558,000 units. Previously, 1997's Let's Talk About Love opened with 334,000 copies, while 1999's All the Way... A Decade of Song debuted with 303,000. The 558,000 figure became her third‑largest one‑week total, behind the 640,000 units of All the Way... A Decade of Song and the 624,000 copies of Let's Talk About Love, both achieved during the Christmas season.

In its second week, the album fell to number two with 263,000 copies sold. It remained at number two the following week, selling 226,000 units. For the next two weeks, it held the number three position with sales of 163,000 and 114,000 copies respectively. In its sixth week, it dropped to number six with 101,000 units sold, and in the seventh week it climbed back to number two with sales of 143,000 copies. A New Day Has Come spent 10 weeks inside the top 10 of the Billboard 200. It ranked number 12 on the list of the best‑selling albums of 2002 in the United States, with 2,645,000 copies sold. In January 2003, the album was certified triple platinum by the RIAA, and as of 5 December 2010 it had sold 3,307,000 copies in the United States.

In Canada, the album debuted at number one with 151,600 copies sold, more than 10 times the sales of its nearest competitor, Shakira's Laundry Service (12,200). It remained at number one for seven consecutive weeks, marking Dion's longest run at the top and surpassing the six‑week reign of The Colour of My Love. The album was certified six times platinum by CRIA.

A New Day Has Come topped the charts in most European countries and received multi‑platinum, platinum, and gold certifications. After selling three million copies in Europe and spending seven weeks at number one on the European Top 100 Albums, it was certified triple platinum by the IFPI. Billboard ranked it as the third top album of 2002 in Europe, behind Shakira's Laundry Service and Anastacia's Freak of Nature. The album also reached number one in Australia and New Zealand and was certified double platinum in both countries.

Overall, the album entered at number one in 17 countries, becoming the biggest global debut of 2002. Its worldwide commercial success placed it at number five on the IFPI list of the best‑selling albums of 2002. A New Day Has Come has sold 12 million copies worldwide.

== Accolades ==
In 2003, Dion won the American Music Award for Favorite Adult Contemporary Artist and was nominated for Favorite Pop/Rock Female Artist. She also received a Billboard Music Award for Hot Adult Contemporary Artist and earned nominations for Top Pop Catalog Artist and Hot Adult Contemporary Track for "A New Day Has Come". Dion won several additional awards, including the Félix Award for Artist of the Year Achieving the Most Success in a Language Other Than French, the IFPI Hong Kong Top Sales Music Award for Best Selling Foreign Release (A New Day Has Come), the Arion Music Award for Best Selling International Album (A New Day Has Come), and the Dragon Award for International Female Artist of the Year.

"A New Day Has Come" also received an ASCAP Pop Award and a BMI Pop Award for Most Performed Song, as well as three SOCAN Awards in the Pop Music, International Achievement, and Classic Songs categories. Dion was also nominated for four Juno Awards of 2003: Artist of the Year, Fan Choice Award, Album of the Year (A New Day Has Come), and Single of the Year ("A New Day Has Come"). Other nominations included the People's Choice Award for Favourite Female Musical Performer, the Echo Award for International Female Artist of the Year, and the MuchMoreMusic Award for the "A New Day Has Come" music video.

== Track listing ==
No.	Title	Writer(s)	Producer(s)	Length
1.	"I'm Alive"	Kristian Lundin; Andreas Carlsson	Lundin; Ric Wake^{[a]}; Richie Jones^{[a]}	3:30
2.	"Right in Front of You"	Steve Morales; Sheppard Solomon; Kara DioGuardi; David Siegel	Morales	4:13
3.	"Have You Ever Been in Love"	Anders Bagge; Peer Åström; Tom Nichols; Daryl Hall; Laila Bagge	Bagge; Åström	4:08
4.	"Rain, Tax (It's Inevitable)"	Terry Britten; Charlie Dore	Christopher Neil	3:25
5.	"A New Day Has Come" (radio remix)	Aldo Nova; Stephan Moccio	Wake; Walter Afanasieff; Nova; Jones^{[a]}; S.A.F.^{[a]}	4:23
6.	"Ten Days"	Nova; Maxime Le Forestier; Gérald de Palmas	Palmas	3:37
7.	"Goodbye's (The Saddest Word)"	Robert John "Mutt" Lange	Lange	5:19
8.	"Prayer"	Corey Hart	Afanasieff	5:34
9.	"I Surrender"	Louis Biancaniello; Sam Watters	Simon Franglen	4:47
10.	"At Last"	Mack Gordon; Harry Warren	Humberto Gatica; Guy Roche	4:17
11.	"Super Love"	Roche; Shelly Peiken	Roche	4:16
12.	"Sorry for Love"	DioGuardi; Bagge; Åström; Arnthor Birgisson	Bagge; Åström; Birgisson	4:10
13.	"Aún existe amor"	Riccardo Cocciante; Ignacio Ballesteros-Diaz	Gatica; Vito Luprano	3:52
14.	"The Greatest Reward"	Pascal Obispo; Carlsson; Jörgen Elofsson; Lionel Florence; Patrice Guirao	Lundin; Carlsson	3:28
15.	"When the Wrong One Loves You Right"	Martin Briley; Francis Galluccio; Marjorie Maye	Wake; Jones^{[a]}	3:48
16.	"A New Day Has Come"	Nova; Moccio	Afanasieff; Nova	5:42
17.	"Nature Boy"	Eden Ahbez	Afanasieff	3:45
Total length:				72:14

=== Notes ===
- ^{^a} signifies an additional producer
- The Canadian and US editions exclude "Super Love".
- The 2002 limited edition includes a bonus DVD with the audio tracks "All Because of You" and "Coulda Woulda Shoulda", the music video for "I'm Alive", and a preview video of A New Day....
- The 2008 collector's edition includes a bonus DVD with the music videos for "A New Day Has Come", "Have You Ever Been in Love", "Goodbye's (The Saddest Word)", and "I'm Alive", as well as the videos "Making of the album", "Making of A New Day Has Come video", and "Have You Ever Been in Love in the studio".

== Personnel ==
Adapted from AllMusic.

- Walter Afanasieff – arranger, bass, drum programming, keyboards, producer, programming
- John Amatiello – digital editing, Pro Tools
- Magnus Anderson – assistant engineer
- Fredrik Andersson – string engineer
- Jim Annunziato – engineering
- Peer Åström – digital editing
- Anders Bagge – arranger, engineering, producer, background vocals
- Janie Barnett – background vocals
- Tom Bender – mixing assistant
- Francis Benítez – background vocals
- Dushyant Bhakta – engineering
- Kevin Breit – engineering, acoustic guitar, electric guitar
- Arnthor Birgisson – producer
- Terry Britten – guitar
- Chris Brooke – assistant, assistant engineer, engineering, mixing assistant
- Marcus Brown – bass, drums, keyboard programming, percussion
- Jorge Calandrelli – conductor, orchestral arrangements, piano
- Andreas Carlsson – guitar, producer, background vocals
- Jennifer Carr – background vocals
- Sue Ann Carwell – background vocals
- Dorian Cheah – electric guitar
- Chiquito – assistant engineer
- Sébastien Chouard – guitar
- Christian B. – producer, programming
- Kevin Churko – engineering, Pro Tools
- Datz Pyle – orchestra contractor
- Rich Davis – production coordination
- Matthew Dellapolla – scoring consultant
- Lenny DeRose – engineering
- Joey Diggs – background vocals
- Celine Dion – liner notes, primary artist, background vocals
- Peter Doell – engineering, recording
- Margaret Dorn – background vocals
- Felipe Elgueta – engineering, synthesizer programming
- Mark Eshelman – scoring crew
- Keith Fluitt – background vocals
- Peter Fogselius – mixing assistant
- Kevin Fox – cello
- Simon Franglen – arranger, keyboards, producer, synthesizer programming
- Michel Gallone – assistant, assistant engineer
- Humberto Gatica – arranger, engineering, mixing, vocal engineering, producer
- Gavin Greenaway – string arrangements, string conducting
- Mary Griffin – background vocals
- Rutger Gunnarsson – string arrangements, string conducting
- Mick Guzauski – mixing
- Nana Hedin – background vocals
- Dan Hetzel – engineering
- Simon Hurrell – engineering, track engineering
- Paul Jackson, Jr. – guitar
- Henrik Janson – string arrangements, string conducting
- Uli Janson – string arrangements, string conducting
- Skyler Jett – background vocals
- Richie Jones – drum programming, guitar, producer
- Steven Kadison – assistant, mastering assistant
- Chantal Kreviazuk – guest artist, background vocals
- Eric Kupper – guitar, keyboard programming
- Michael Landau – guitar
- Robert John "Mutt" Lange – guitar, producer, background vocals
- Thomas Lindberg – bass
- Jason Lloyd – scoring crew
- Bernard Löhr – mixing, string engineering
- Kristian Lundin – keyboards, mixing, producer, programming
- Vito Luprano – executive producer, producer
- Nick Marshall – assistant engineer
- Vladimir Meller – compilation mastering, mastering
- Chieli Minucci – guitar
- Steve Morales – arranger, MIDI programming, producer, background vocals
- Maryanne Morgan – background vocals
- Pablo Munguía – assistant engineer
- Christopher Neil – producer
- Aldo Nova – producer
- Kenny O'Brien – vocal arrangement, vocal editing, background vocals
- Esbjörn Öhrwall – guitar
- Jeanette Olsson – background vocals
- Rafael Padilla – percussion
- Richard Page – background vocals
- Woody Pornpitaksuk – compilation editing
- Mark Portmann – arranger, keyboards
- Steve Prestage – engineering
- Dave Reitzas – engineering
- Claytoven Richardson – background vocals
- Guy Roche – arranger, drum programming, producer, synthesizer
- Maggie Rodford – string coordination
- William Ross – conductor, orchestral arrangements, string arrangements
- Mark Russell – production coordination
- Sakai – background vocals
- Denis Savage – assistant engineer, vocal engineering
- Dave Scheuer – engineering
- David Siegel – keyboards
- Harry "Slick" Sommerdahl – piano
- Tony Stanton – copyist
- Stockholm Session Orchestra – strings
- Shane Stoner – engineering
- Christian Szczesniak – acoustic guitar
- Nick Thomas – engineering
- Shelene Thomas – background vocals
- Michael Hart Thompson – guitar
- Shania Twain – background vocals
- Ric Wake – producer
- Dan Warner – acoustic guitar, electric guitar
- Sam Watters – background vocals
- Patrick Weber – stage technician
- Yvonne Williams – background vocals
- Joe Wohlmuth – digital editing
- Nick Wollage – string engineering
- Jennifer Young – assistant engineer

== Charts ==
=== Weekly charts ===
Weekly chart performance
Chart (2002)	Peak position
Australian Albums (ARIA)	1
Austrian Albums (Ö3 Austria)	1
Belgian Albums (Ultratop Flanders)	2
Belgian Albums (Ultratop Wallonia)	1
Canadian Albums (Billboard)	1
Czech Albums (ČNS IFPI)	12
Danish Albums (Hitlisten)	1
Dutch Albums (Album Top 100)	1
European Albums (Music & Media)	1
Finnish Albums (Suomen virallinen lista)	1
French Albums (SNEP)	1
German Albums (Offizielle Top 100)	2
Greek Albums (IFPI)	1
Hungarian Albums (MAHASZ)	2
Irish Albums (IRMA)	1
Italian Albums (FIMI)	1
Italian Albums (Musica e dischi)	1
Japanese Albums (Oricon)	15
Malaysian Albums (RIM)	3
New Zealand Albums (RMNZ)	1
Norwegian Albums (VG-lista)	1
Polish Albums (ZPAV)	2
Portuguese Albums (AFP)	2
Quebec (ADISQ)	1
Scottish Albums (Official Charts)	1
Singaporean Albums (RIAS)	2
Spanish Albums (PROMUSICAE)	4
Swedish Albums (Sverigetopplistan)	1
Swiss Albums (Schweizer Hitparade)	1
UK Albums (Official Charts)	1
US Billboard 200	1

=== Monthly charts ===
Monthly chart performance
Chart (2002)	Peak position
South Korean Albums (RIAK)	1

=== Year-end charts ===
2002 year-end chart performance
Chart (2002)	Position
Australian Albums (ARIA)	15
Austrian Albums (Ö3 Austria)	9
Belgian Albums (Ultratop Flanders)	5
Belgian Albums (Ultratop Wallonia)	8
Canadian Albums (SoundScan)	3
Danish Albums (Hitlisten)	2
Dutch Albums (Album Top 100)	4
European Albums (Music & Media)	3
Finnish Foreign Albums (Suomen virallinen lista)	8
French Albums (SNEP)	5
German Albums (Offizielle Top 100)	9
Italian Albums (FIMI)	15
New Zealand Albums (RMNZ)	7
Norwegian Russefeiring Period Albums (VG-lista)	2
Spanish International Albums (PROMUSICAE)	11
Swedish Albums (Sverigetopplistan)	8
Swiss Albums (Schweizer Hitparade)	2
UK Albums (OCC)	39
US Billboard 200	19
Worldwide Albums (IFPI)	5

2003 year-end chart performance
Chart (2003)	Position
Belgian Albums (Ultratop Flanders)	95
Dutch Albums (Album Top 100)	81
French Albums (SNEP)	148
US Billboard 200	168

=== Decade-end charts ===
Chart (2000–2009)	Position
Dutch Albums (MegaCharts)	52
US Billboard 200	145

=== All-time charts ===
Decade-end chart performanceAll-time chart performance for A New Day Has Come
Chart	Position
Canadian Artists Albums (SoundScan)	17

== Certifications and sales ==
Certifications
Region	Certification	Certified units/sales
Argentina (CAPIF)	2× Platinum	80,000^{^}
Australia (ARIA)	2× Platinum	140,000^{^}
Austria (IFPI Austria)	Platinum	40,000^{*}
Belgium (BRMA)	2× Platinum	100,000^{*}
Brazil (Pro-Música Brasil)	Gold	50,000^{*}
Canada (Music Canada)	6× Platinum	600,000^{^}
China	—	75,000
Denmark (IFPI Danmark)	2× Platinum	100,000^{^}
Finland (Musiikkituottajat)	Gold	32,915
France (SNEP)	3× Platinum	900,000^{*}
Germany (BVMI)	3× Gold	450,000^{^}
Greece (IFPI Greece)	Platinum	30,000^{^}
Hungary (MAHASZ)	Gold	
Japan (RIAJ)	Gold	100,000^{^}
Netherlands (NVPI)	Platinum	80,000^{^}
New Zealand (RMNZ)	2× Platinum	30,000^{^}
Norway (IFPI Norway)	Platinum	50,000^{*}
Poland (ZPAV)	Gold	35,000^{*}
South Korea	—	141,581
Spain (Promusicae)	Platinum	100,000^{^}
Sweden (GLF)	Platinum	60,000^{^}
Switzerland (IFPI Switzerland)	3× Platinum	120,000^{^}
United Kingdom (BPI)	Platinum	300,000^{^}
United States (RIAA)	3× Platinum	3,307,000
Summaries
Europe (IFPI)	3× Platinum	3,000,000^{*}
Worldwide	—	12,000,000
^{*} Sales figures based on certification alone.^{^} Shipments figures based on certification alone.

== Release history ==
Release history
Region	Date	Label	Format	Catalog
Australia	25 March 2002	Epic	CD; cassette	COL 506226 2
Europe	25 March 2002	Columbia	CD; cassette	COL 506226 2
Canada	26 March 2002	Columbia	CD; cassette	86400
United States	26 March 2002	Epic	CD; cassette	86400
Japan	30 March 2002	SMEJ	CD	EICP-55
Europe	11 November 2002	Columbia	CD/DVD	COL 506226 7, COL 506226 5
North America	19 November 2002	Epic	CD/DVD	87039, 59296
Australia	22 November 2002	Epic	CD/DVD	506226 7, 506226 5
North America	29 January 2008	Legacy Recordings	CD/DVD	88697226662
Japan	27 February 2008	Legacy Recordings	CD/DVD	EICP-929〜EICP-930
Australia	19 April 2008	Legacy Recordings	CD/DVD	88697226662
Europe	21 April 2008	Legacy Recordings	CD/DVD	88697226662

== See also ==
- 2002 in British music charts
- List of best-selling albums by women
- List of Billboard 200 number-one albums of 2002
- List of European number-one hits of 2002
- List of fastest-selling albums
- List of number-one albums from the 2000s (Denmark)
- List of number-one albums from the 2000s (New Zealand)
- List of number-one albums of 2002 (Australia)
- List of number-one albums of 2002 (Canada)
- List of number-one hits of 2002 (Italy)
- List of number-one singles of 2002 (France)
- List of top 25 albums for 2002 in Australia
- List of UK Albums Chart number ones of the 2000s
