= A New Day Has Come (song) =

2002 single by Celine Dion

Single by Celine Dion

from the album A New Day Has Come
- B-side: "Prayer"
- Released: 11 March 2002
- Studio: Cove City Sound (Long Island); Sony Music (New York); Wallyworld (California); The Enterprise II (Los Angeles); Piccolo (Montreal); Maison de Musique (Canada)
- Genre: Pop
- Length: 4:23 (radio remix); 5:43 (album version)
- Label: Columbia; Epic
- Songwriters: Aldo Nova; Stephan Moccio
- Producers: Walter Afanasieff; Aldo Nova; Ric Wake

Celine Dion singles chronology
"Sous le vent" (2001)	"A New Day Has Come" (2002)	"I'm Alive" (2002)

Music video
- "A New Day Has Come" on YouTube

"A New Day Has Come" is a song by Canadian singer Celine Dion for her seventh English-language album of the same name (2002). The song was written by Aldo Nova and Stephan Moccio and produced by Walter Afanasieff and Nova. It was released as the album's lead single on 11 March 2002 by Columbia Records and Epic Records. "A New Day Has Come" is a piano-driven ballad in 6/8 time. The midtempo radio version, co-produced and remixed by Christian B and Marc Dold of S.A.F. (Swiss American Federation) along with Ric Wake, reworked the track into 4/4 time, added guitars and electronic elements, and was issued as the lead single. Both versions appear on the album.

Dion stated that the song reflects the birth of her son René-Charles Angélil. It received positive reviews from music critics, who praised Dion's vocals and its uplifting lyrics. The music video was directed by Dave Meyers and premiered in March 2002. The song was successful internationally, reaching the top 10 on the Canadian Singles Chart, UK Singles Chart, and several European charts, while reaching number 22 on the Billboard Hot 100 and topping the Hot Adult Contemporary Tracks chart for 21 weeks. It was later included on the compilations My Love: Essential Collection, Complete Best, Ultimate Box (2008), and The Best So Far... 2018 Tour Edition (2018).

On 25 July 2025, Swedish DJ and producer Sebastian Ingrosso, a member of the Swedish House Mafia, released a progressive house remix of "A New Day Has Come", titled "A New Day".

== Background ==
In 2000, Dion announced that she was taking a break from her career. During this time, she focused on her personal life and gave birth to her first child, René-Charles Angélil. After two years, she confirmed her return and said she was eager to record new material:

"I couldn't wait to go back into the recording studio. And, I loved the songs that people wrote for me on this album. Those songs became even closer to me because, the fact that I took two years off, they wrote songs for me that were even closer to my emotions. I had things to talk about. I had things to sing about. It was a fun adventure, no pressure, relaxed, smooth, powerful but controlled. I really had a wonderful time. And to see my friends again, it was great".

"A New Day Has Come" was sent to US radio stations on 6 February 2002. It was released internationally on 11 March 2002 and included on Dion's album A New Day Has Come. In October 2008, "A New Day Has Come" was added to the compilation My Love: Essential Collection.

== Composition ==
"A New Day Has Come" (2002)
A 30 second sample of "A New Day Has Come".

"A New Day Has Come" was written by Aldo Nova and Stephan Moccio and produced by Walter Afanasieff, Nova, and Ric Wake (Wake produced only the radio edit). Additional production was provided by Richie Jones, Christian B, and Marc Dold. The song exists in two versions: a piano-led ballad in 6/8 time and a midtempo radio version in common time. Both appear on the album. Both versions are written in the key of F♯ major. The album version has a slow tempo of 40 beats per minute, while the radio remix runs at 92 beats per minute.

Lyrically, the song reflects Dion's personal struggles and the joy she found after becoming a mother. Her 13-month-old son René-Charles Dion Angélil is the central inspiration, with Dion singing: "Where there was weakness I've found my strength/All in the eyes of a boy".

According to Dion, the song carries a broader message of renewal:

"For me, this represents the birth of my child. Nothing can ever come close to that. But it can mean different things for anyone who has to find strength again. I think it's very positive".

== Critical reception ==
"A New Day Has Come" received positive reviews from music critics. Stephen Thomas Erlewine of AllMusic praised the song. Barnes & Noble's editorial review stated that it marked Celine Dion's return to recording after a lengthy maternity leave, and reflected the pop singer's growth as an artist and as a woman. The review added that although Dion's songs had long centered on the power of love, she shifted from romantic to maternal themes on this album, noting her delivery on the uplifting title track.

Chuck Taylor of Billboard wrote that the life-affirming "A New Day Has Come" "comes off like a gentle exhale against the world's ills". He described the Ric Wake radio remix as opening with an Enya-inspired whisper before a shuffle rhythm enters and lifts the song "like a dove gracefully taking flight". The album edit, he noted, removes the beat and allows Dion's performance to shape the song's message. According to Taylor, on both versions Dion delivers a restrained vocal, dramatic enough to guide the emotion but delicate enough to offer comfort.

Dave Karger of Entertainment Weekly wrote that although celebratory in tone, the track uses surprisingly restrained vocals from Dion. He added that while the lyrics were not subtle, the song worked effectively as a lullaby. Sal Cinquemani of Slant Magazine wrote that two of the album's strongest tracks were the uplifting midtempo "I'm Alive" and the title song, adding that Dion had not delivered such a controlled performance since 1993's "The Power of Love".

== Commercial performance ==
On the Austrian Singles Chart, the song debuted at number 10 on 24 March 2002. The following week, it fell to number 14. On 7 April 2002, it returned to number 10. The next week, it reached number nine, where it stayed for another week. "A New Day Has Come" continued to fluctuate on the chart for the next two weeks, eventually returning to number nine. It remained on the chart for 15 consecutive weeks.

In Sweden, the song debuted and peaked at number three on the Swedish Singles Chart on 22 March 2002, spending 12 weeks on the chart. On the Norwegian Singles Chart, it debuted at number seven, peaked at number three for two consecutive weeks, and spent 10 weeks on the chart. The single also performed well on the Danish Singles Chart, debuting and peaking at number three and spending eight consecutive weeks on the chart. It was certified gold in Greece and Norway. In Poland, the song reached number one for seven weeks on the Polish Singles Chart, becoming the biggest international hit of 2002 in that country.

On the Australian ARIA Singles Chart, the song debuted at number 23. It climbed to number 21 the following week, then fell to number 25 in its third week. The next week, it rose to number 20. In its fifth week, it dropped to number 29, but in its sixth week, it climbed to number 19, its peak position. The song spent 12 consecutive weeks on the ARIA chart and was certified gold by the Australian Recording Industry Association (ARIA) for sales exceeding 35,000 units. On the New Zealand Singles Chart, it debuted at number 39, where it remained for a second week. It later climbed to number 34, then fell to number 35 for another week. In the following weeks, it rose to numbers 29, 24, 21, and finally 20, its peak position. It spent 16 weeks on the chart.

On the US Hot Adult Contemporary Tracks, the song broke the record for most weeks at number one, staying on top for 21 weeks. The previous record holders were Phil Collins' "You'll Be in My Heart" and Dion's own "Because You Loved Me," both of which spent 19 weeks at number one. The record was later surpassed when "Drift Away" by Uncle Kracker with Dobie Gray stayed at number one for 28 weeks in 2004. Dion nearly surpassed "Drift Away" herself, but "Have You Ever Been in Love" peaked at number two for 14 weeks, setting another record. On the US Billboard Hot 100, the song reached number 22, becoming her last major hit on that chart. The DVD single was released four months later in the US, peaking at number 11 on the Top Music Video chart and number 16 on the Hot 100 Singles Sales. It sold 45,000 copies and was certified gold. In Canada, "A New Day Has Come" reached number two and was certified platinum.

In the United Kingdom, the song entered the UK Singles Chart at number seven on 23 March 2002. It then fell to numbers 13, 15, 20, 24, and 29, before climbing to number 27 on 5 April 2002. It left the UK Singles Chart at number 64 on 25 May 2002, spending 10 weeks on the chart. It was certified silver in 2018 and gold in 2026.

In Ireland, the song debuted at number 10 on the Irish Singles Chart for the week ending 14 March 2002. The following week, it fell to number 11, but in its third week, it returned to number 10. It spent 10 consecutive weeks on the Irish chart.

== Music video ==
The music video was directed by Dave Meyers and premiered in March 2002. It was shot on West Palm Beach, Florida, United States. The video shows people from different cultures going through a day, intercut with Dion singing among the clouds and later on a beach. Ric Wake's radio remix was used in the video.

== Live performances and promotion ==
"A New Day Has Come" was performed and included on the VH1 Divas Las Vegas album. Dion promoted the song extensively in 2002, singing it during various TV programmes and specials, such as Wetten, dass..? in Germany on 23 March 2002, and on the Rockin' for the USA: A National Salute to the US Military special on 25 May 2002.

Dion performed the ballad version of the song during her show A New Day... at Caesars Palace, Las Vegas beginning in November 2004, and released it on the Live in Las Vegas: A New Day... DVD in December 2007. The ballad version was also performed on The Oprah Winfrey Show in 2007 as part of promotion for her album Taking Chances.

The radio remix was performed only once, in Seoul, South Korea, during the Taking Chances World Tour on 18 March 2008. "A New Day Has Come" was not performed again until 2015, when Dion returned with her revamped residency show in Vegas, titled Celine, and included a shortened acoustic version of the song. A new shortened string version premiered during her 2018 tour, replacing the first acoustic version in the final year of her Las Vegas residency show.

== Accolades ==
"A New Day Has Come" won the ASCAP Pop Award and the BMI Pop Award for Most Performed Song, as well as three SOCAN Awards in the Pop Music, International Achievement, and Classic Songs categories. The song was also nominated for the Juno Award for Single of the Year at the Juno Awards of 2003, and by Billboard for Hot Adult Contemporary Track. The music video was nominated for the MuchMoreMusic Award as well.

== Formats and track listing ==
- European CD single
1. "A New Day Has Come" (radio version) – 4:23
2. "A New Day Has Come" (album edit) – 4:18
- European and Australian CD maxi-single
1. "A New Day Has Come" (radio version) – 4:23
2. "A New Day Has Come" (album edit) – 4:18
3. "Prayer" – 5:34
4. "A New Day Has Come" (Christian B mix) – 3:59
- Japanese CD single
1. "A New Day Has Come" (radio version) – 4:23
2. "Prayer" – 5:34
- UK cassette and CD single #1
1. "A New Day Has Come" (radio version) – 4:23
2. "A New Day Has Come" (album edit) – 4:18
3. "Prayer" – 5:34
- UK CD single #2
1. "A New Day Has Come" (album edit) – 4:18
2. "Sous le vent" – 3:30
3. "Misled" – 3:30
4. "Misled" (video) – 3:30
- US DVD single
1. "A New Day Has Come" video – 4:20
2. Making the "A New Day Has Come" video – 3:03
3. Making the album – 12:15
4. "Have You Ever Been in Love" in the studio – 5:05
5. Biography
6. Photo gallery

== Credits and personnel ==
Credits are adapted from the liner notes of A New Day Has Come, Epic Records.

Recording locations

- Recording – Cove City Sound Studios (Long Island)
- Sony Music Studios (New York)
- Wallyworld (California)
- The Enterprise II (Los Angeles)
- Studio Piccolo (Montreal)
- Maison de Musique (Canada)

Personnel

- Aldo Nova – songwriting, production
- Stephan Moccio – songwriting
- Walter Afanasieff – production
- Ric Wake – production
- Richie Jones – additional production
- Christian B – additional production
- Marc Dold – additional production, guitars
- Chieli Minucci – guitars
- Mick Guzauski – mixing

== Charts ==
=== Weekly charts ===
Weekly chart performance
Chart (2002)	Peak position
Australia (ARIA)	19
Austria (Ö3 Austria Top 40)	9
Belgium (Ultratop 50 Flanders)	14
Belgium (Ultratop 50 Wallonia)	13
Canada (Nielsen SoundScan)	2
Canada Radio (Nielsen BDS)	1
Canada AC (Nielsen BDS)	1
Canada CHR/Top 40 (Nielsen BDS)	6
Czech Republic (Rádio Top 50)	1
Denmark (Tracklisten)	3
Danish Airplay (Hitlisten)	1
Europe (European Hot 100 Singles)	4
Finland (Suomen virallinen lista)	17
France (SNEP)	23
Germany (GfK)	6
Greece (IFPI)	8
Hungary (Single Top 40)	2
Ireland (IRMA)	10
Italy (FIMI)	10
Italy (Musica e dischi)	9
Netherlands (Dutch Top 40)	19
Netherlands (Single Top 100)	21
New Zealand (Recorded Music NZ)	20
Norway (VG-lista)	3
Poland (National Airplay Chart)	1
Portugal (AFP)	7
Quebec Radio Songs (ADISQ)	1
Romania (Romanian Top 100)	2
Scottish Singles Sales (Official Charts)	8
Spain (Promusicae)	12
Sweden (Sverigetopplistan)	3
Switzerland (Schweizer Hitparade)	2
UK Singles (Official Charts)	7
UK Airplay (Music Week)	35
US Billboard Hot 100	22
US Adult Contemporary (Billboard)	1
US Adult Pop Airplay (Billboard)	19
US Dance Club Songs (Billboard)	44
US Pop Airplay (Billboard)	25
US Top 40 Tracks (Billboard)	27

=== Year-end charts ===
Year-end chart performance
Chart (2002)	Position
Austria (Ö3 Austria Top 40)	52
Belgium (Ultratop 50 Wallonia)	99
Canada (Nielsen SoundScan)	39
Canada Radio (Nielsen BDS)	6
Europe (European Hot 100 Singles)	53
Germany (Media Control)	49
Ireland (IRMA)	70
Italy (FIMI)	48
Netherlands (Dutch Top 40)	131
Norway Russefeiring Period (VG-lista)	4
Sweden (Hitlistan)	46
Switzerland (Schweizer Hitparade)	43
UK Singles (OCC)	91
US Billboard Hot 100	91
US Adult Contemporary (Billboard)	3
US Adult Top 40 (Billboard)	63

=== Decade-end charts ===
Decade-end chart performance
Chart (2000–2009)	Position
US Adult Contemporary (Billboard)	42

== Certifications and sales ==
Certifications
Region	Certification	Certified units/sales
Australia (ARIA)	Gold	35,000^{^}
Canada (Music Canada)	Platinum	80,000^{‡}
Greece (IFPI Greece)	Gold	10,000^{^}
Norway (IFPI Norway)	Gold	
United Kingdom (BPI)	Gold	400,000^{‡}
United States (RIAA)	Gold	357,000
^{^} Shipments figures based on certification alone.^{‡} Sales+streaming figures based on certification alone.

== Release history ==
Release history
Region	Date	Format	Label	Ref.
United Kingdom	11 March 2002	Cassette; CD	Epic	
Canada	15 March 2002	CD	Epic	
Australia	18 March 2002	CD	Epic	
Japan	27 March 2002	CD	SMEJ	
United States	28 May 2002	7-inch vinyl; DVD	Epic	

== "A New Day" remix by Sebastian Ingrosso ==
"A New Day"

Single by Sebastian Ingrosso featuring Celine Dion
- Released: 25 July 2025
- Genre: Progressive house
- Length: 3:27
- Label: Superhuman Music
- Songwriters: Aldo Nova; Stephan Moccio; Sebastian Ingrosso; Yaro Polikarpov
- Producers: Sebastian Ingrosso; Yaro

Celine Dion singles chronology
"Hymne à l'amour" (2024)	"A New Day" (2025)	"Dansons" (2026)

Visualizer
- "A New Day" on YouTube

On 25 July 2025, Swedish House Mafia's Sebastian Ingrosso released the single "A New Day" featuring Celine Dion, a progressive house reinterpretation of Dion's 2002 hit "A New Day Has Come". The track became a commercial success, topping the Quebec Digital Sales chart for three consecutive weeks and reaching number six on the US Dance Digital Song Sales chart. In September 2025, "A New Day" received a nomination for International Collaboration of the Year at the NRJ Music Awards.

=== Formats and track listing ===
- Digital and streaming single
1. "A New Day" – 3:27
2. "A New Day" (extended mix) – 4:23

=== Charts ===
Chart performance
Chart (2025)	Peak position
Canada Digital Song Sales (Billboard)	23
Honduras Anglo Airplay (Monitor Latino)	4
Lithuania Airplay (TopHit)	82
Quebec Digital Song Sales (ADISQ)	1
Sweden (Sverigetopplistan)	71
UK Singles Downloads (Official Charts)	21
US Dance Digital Song Sales (Billboard)	6

=== Release history ===
Release history
Region	Date	Format	Label	Ref.
Various	25 July 2025	Digital download; streaming	Superhuman Music	

== See also ==
- Billboard Year-End Hot 100 singles of 2002
- List of Billboard Adult Contemporary number ones of 2002
- List of UK top-ten singles in 2002
