= Goodbye's (The Saddest Word) =

Single by Celine Dion

from the album A New Day Has Come
- B-side: "All Because of You"
- Released: 25 November 2002
- Studio: Piccolo
- Genre: Pop
- Length: 5:19
- Label: Columbia; Epic
- Songwriter: Robert John "Mutt" Lange
- Producer: Robert John "Mutt" Lange

Celine Dion singles chronology
"I'm Alive" (2002)	"Goodbye's (The Saddest Word)" (2002)	"I Drove All Night" (2003)

Music video
- "Goodbye's (The Saddest Word)" on YouTube

"Goodbye's (The Saddest Word)" is a song recorded by Canadian recording artist Celine Dion for her seventh English-language album A New Day Has Come (2002). The song was written and produced by Robert John "Mutt" Lange, while Lange and his then-wife, country singer Shania Twain, provided backing vocals. Lyrically, it addresses motherly love and the fear of losing one's mother. It was released as the album's third and final commercial single on 25 November 2002 by Columbia Records and Epic Records.

The song received favorable reviews from music critics, who described it as a heartfelt and emotional track, and praised Dion's performance. The music video for "Goodbye's (The Saddest Word)" was directed by Chris Applebaum between 12–13 October 2002 in Paris, France, and premiered in November 2002. The song had moderate chart success, reaching the top 50 in the countries where it charted, but it did not match the performance of earlier singles.

== Background and composition ==
"Goodbye's (The Saddest Word)" was written and produced by Robert John "Mutt" Lange, who had previously worked with Dion in 1999 on "If Walls Could Talk." Lange and his then-wife, country singer Shania Twain, provided backing vocals. The song runs 5 minutes 19 seconds, with a radio edit of 4 minutes 23 seconds. It was recorded at Studio Piccolo and released on 18 November 2002.

Lyrically, the ballad reflects on the deep bond between a child and her mother. "There is no other love like a mother's love for her child", she sings. Dion first heard the Robert John "Mutt" Lange composition in 1999 and turned it down. "Now, being a mother, I found the strength to sing it, but it was hard", she said. Its message? "Never wait too long to tell someone how you feel", she added.

In October 2008, "Goodbye's (The Saddest Word)" was included on the European edition of My Love: Ultimate Essential Collection greatest hits.

== Critical reception ==
Barnes & Noble's editorial review described it as "a heartfelt, country-tinged song". Chuck Taylor from Billboard criticized the choice of releasing "Goodbye's (The Saddest Word)" as the third single, noting that the ballad was aimed solely at adult contemporary radio. He called the song "devastatingly beautiful," a loving tribute to one's mother at death's door, and wrote that Dion "delivers it with a heaving helping of passion, emotionally drawing one's attention to the devotional message". Although he felt many listeners would relate to the theme of losing a parent, he considered the single choice commercially disappointing.

Mike Ross of Jam! Canoe wrote, "Celine is at her lovey-doveyest in Mutt Lange's Goodbye's (The Saddest Word), helped by not one, but two soaring key changes in the same song, which is then launched into a high Earth orbit of melodrama by an orchestra that would make John Williams blush with envy". Writing for Rolling Stone in May 2002, Rob Sheffield said the Mutt Lange composition was "sure to inspire many hours of dull debate with Bernie Taupin". He also referred to Dion's voice as "just furniture polish". Sal Cinquemani of Slant Magazine commented that it is "the kind of sappy mama-lovin' tune that will leave you nauseous or in tears". Christopher Smith from TalkAboutPopMusic described the song as a "beautiful Country-style pop ballad".

== Commercial performance ==
"Goodbye's (The Saddest Word)" had moderate chart results, reaching the top-40 in several markets. In the UK, the song entered the UK Singles Chart at number 38 on 7 December 2002. It dropped to number 60 the following week, spending two weeks on the chart. In Ireland, the song debuted at number 42 on the Irish Singles Chart on 28 November 2002. It held the same position the next week, then fell to number 49, spending three weeks on the chart.

On the Belgium's Wallonia Singles Chart, the song debuted and peaked at number 36, leaving the chart the next week. On the Belgium's Flanders Singles Chart, it debuted at number 47 on 14 December 2002. It slipped to number 49 the following week, then rose to number 46 on 28 December 2002. In its fourth week, it reached number 39. In the Netherlands, the song entered the Dutch Top 40 at number 67 on 30 November 2002. One week later, it climbed to number 51. It continued to fluctuate over the next two weeks before rising from number 67 to number 42. On 18 January 2003, it peaked at number 38 and spent 11 consecutive weeks on the chart. In Austria, the song debuted at number 50 on the Ö3 Austria Top 40. It moved to number 49 the following week, then to number 45, eventually peaking at number 41. It remained on the chart for 10 weeks.

== Music video ==
The music video for "Goodbye's (The Saddest Word)" was directed by Chris Applebaum between 12–13 October 2002 in Paris, France, and premiered in November 2002. In 2006, a second version of the video leaked online, containing previously unseen material. This unreleased cut, also directed by Applebaum in October 2002, includes additional scenes of Dion and presents a more sensual tone. The radio edit of the song was used for the video, with some lines near the end shortened or altered. The video also incorporates a black-and-white photoshoot of Dion posing for the cover of her eighth English-language studio album, One Heart (2003).

== Live performances ==
Dion performed the song for the first time during the A New Day Has Come CBS special in March 2002. She also sang it on Star Academy in 2002. She later performed the song during "World Children's Day 2002". Dion also performed it on Top of the Pops in 2002.

== Formats and track listing ==
- European CD single
1. "Goodbye's (The Saddest Word)" (radio edit) – 4:23
2. "All Because of You" – 3:30
- European CD maxi-single
1. "Goodbye's (The Saddest Word)" (radio edit) – 4:23
2. "All Because of You" – 3:30
3. "You Shook Me All Night Long" (with Anastacia – live from VH1 Divas) – 3:51
4. "Blue Christmas" – 3:50
5. "Goodbye's (The Saddest Word)" (video – live from TV special) – 4:43
- UK cassette single
1. "Goodbye's (The Saddest Word)" (radio edit) – 4:23
2. "Blue Christmas" – 3:50
3. "All the Way" (with Frank Sinatra) – 3:53
- UK CD single #1
1. "Goodbye's (The Saddest Word)" (radio edit) – 4:23
2. "Blue Christmas" – 3:50
3. "Goodbye's (The Saddest Word)" (video – live from TV special) – 4:43
- UK CD single #2
1. "Goodbye's (The Saddest Word)" – 5:19
2. "All the Way" (with Frank Sinatra) – 3:53
3. "You Shook Me All Night Long" (with Anastacia – live from VH1 Divas) – 3:51

== Credits and personnel ==
Recording locations

- Recording – Piccolo Studio (Montreal)

Personnel

- Robert John "Mutt" Lange – songwriting, production, backing vocals, guitars
- Shania Twain – backing vocals
- Humberto Gatica – mixing
- Gavin Greenaway – strings

Credits adapted from the liner notes of A New Day Has Come, Epic Records.

== Charts ==
Chart performance
Chart (2002–2003)	Peak position
Austria (Ö3 Austria Top 40)	41
Belgium (Ultratop 50 Flanders)	39
Belgium (Ultratop 50 Wallonia)	36
Canada Radio (Nielsen BDS)	62
Canada AC (Nielsen BDS)	16
Czech Republic (Rádio Top 50)	12
Europe (European Hot 100 Singles)	72
Germany (GfK)	56
Hungary (Single Top 40)	15
Ireland (IRMA)	42
Italy (FIMI)	30
Netherlands (Dutch Top 40)	37
Netherlands (Single Top 100)	38
Norway (VG-lista Airplay)	32
Poland (National Airplay Chart)	25
Quebec Radio Songs (ADISQ)	17
Scotland Singles (Official Charts)	35
Sweden (Sverigetopplistan)	45
Switzerland (Schweizer Hitparade)	35
UK Singles (Official Charts)	38
US Adult Contemporary (Billboard)	27

== Release history ==
Release history
Region	Date	Format	Label	Ref.
Denmark	25 November 2002	CD	Columbia	
United Kingdom	25 November 2002	CD	Epic	
