= Sans attendre =

Studio album by Celine Dion
- Released: 2 November 2012
- Recorded: April–September 2012
- Studio: Echo Beach (Florida); Agathe; Omega; ICP; 73; The Village; Moulin de la goulette
- Genre: Pop
- Length: 51:09
- Language: French
- Label: Columbia
- Producer: Thierry Blanchard; Yvan Cassar; David Gategno; Patrick Hampartzoumian; Claude Lemay; Scott Price; Julien Schulteis; Stanislas; Jacques Veneruso

Celine Dion chronology
| The Best of Celine Dion & David Foster (2012) | Sans attendre (2012) | Loved Me Back to Life (2013) |

Singles from Sans attendre
- 1. "Parler à mon père" Released: 2 July 2012; 2. "Le miracle" Released: 2 November 2012; 3. "Qui peut vivre sans amour?" Released: 8 March 2013

Sans attendre (lit. 'Without waiting') is the twenty-fourth studio album and fourteenth French-language album by Canadian singer Celine Dion. It was released by Columbia Records on 2 November 2012 and is her first French studio album since 2007's D'elles. The album includes 16 songs produced mainly by Jacques Veneruso, David Gategno, and Scott Price. It also contains three duets with Johnny Hallyday, Jean-Pierre Ferland, and the late Henri Salvador. The first single, "Parler à mon père", was issued on 2 July 2012, followed by "Le miracle" as the second single. Both reached number one in Quebec, and "Parler à mon père" also entered the top 10 in France. The third single, "Qui peut vivre sans amour?", was sent to radio in March 2013.

Sans attendre received mixed to positive reviews from music critics, some of whom described it as a restrained and personal work. Its songs explore themes such as longing for a deceased father, love, and reflections on an aging mother. The album achieved commercial success in Francophone markets. It debuted at number one in Canada and France, selling almost 100,000 copies in its first week in each country. Sans attendre also topped the charts in Romandy and Wallonia, and entered the top 10 in Switzerland and Poland. It was certified diamond in France, triple platinum in Canada, platinum in Belgium, and gold in Switzerland and Poland. Worldwide sales exceed 1.5 million copies.

== Background ==
On 7 June 2012, Dion's official website announced that during April and May, the singer began recording songs for her next French and English albums. The French album would contain all new material, and the English album would include studio versions of previously unreleased songs from Dion's Las Vegas show, Celine, as well as several new tracks. When asked about the difference between singing in French and English, Dion said: "It's like wearing a pair of jeans or an evening gown. You cannot change what's in your blood. French is my home, my roots. It's where I live first. French is a more interior energy, more poetic. But, when I sing in English, there are different emotions. As a singer I cannot choose, I need both".

On 29 June 2012, celinedion.com previewed a 30-second excerpt of the first single written and co-produced by Jacques Veneruso, "Parler à mon père", from the French-language album scheduled for release on 5 November 2012. However, in selected European countries, it was released on 2 November 2012. The cover art for the single was revealed at the same time. The full version of "Parler à mon père" premiered on 1 July 2012, and the single was released to digital outlets in selected countries the next day.

During an interview with Le Parisien, Dion announced the title of the upcoming French album, Sans attendre, which means "without waiting". She later explained that for her the title means "don't leave until tomorrow what you can do today", and that "today" is the most important day. She also discussed "Parler à mon père", which is about her father, who died in 2003. He was her biggest supporter, and she thinks of him every day, believing that he is always with her and watching over her children.

On 19 August 2012, Dion's official website announced that the album would include "Une chance qu'on s'a", a duet with Canadian artist Jean-Pierre Ferland, who also wrote the song's lyrics. Dion and Ferland had previously performed together during the Céline sur les Plaines concert celebrating Quebec City's 400th anniversary in 2008. Another duet with French singer Johnny Hallyday was also announced. A preview of the music video for "Parler à mon père" was posted on celinedion.com on 5 September 2012, and the full video premiered the next day. It was filmed in Las Vegas on 16 July 2012 and in the Death Valley, and directed by Thierry Vargnes, who had previously worked with Dion on the music videos for "Et s'il n'en restait qu'une (je serais celle-là)" and "Immensité". Dion completed recording her French-language album in September 2012.

== Content ==
On 1 October 2012, Dion's official website presented the album's cover art and announced in a press release that Sans attendre would be released in two versions: a standard edition with 14 tracks and a 24‑page booklet in a jewel case, and a deluxe edition with 16 songs, a 24‑page booklet, and a 12‑page desk calendar in a special digipak. The album cover was created by illustrator Aurore Hutton, niece of former French President Valéry Giscard d'Estaing. Jean-Pierre Ferland, a Canadian singer-songwriter, appears twice on the album. He recorded his own song, "Une chance qu'on s'a", as a duet with Dion and wrote the lyrics for "Je n'ai pas besoin d'amour". Ferland had previously performed two songs with Dion during the Céline sur les Plaines concert, which was released on DVD in 2008. Luc Plamondon, a Canadian lyricist, offered her "Que toi au monde". Both artists had worked together on Dion chante Plamondon in 1991.

Several other artists also joined Dion for duets: French singer and actor Johnny Hallyday on "L'amour peut prendre froid" (a French-language adaptation of "Love Me Anyway" performed by Mary Ann Redmond), and the late French-Caribbean singer Henri Salvador in a virtual duet titled "Tant de temps". Dion had performed two duets with Hallyday in the past during French television specials: "L'envie" in 2005, and "Blueberry Hill" in 2007. She also performed a duet with Salvador on "Le loup, la biche et le chevalier (une chanson douce)" during a French television special in 2003. A studio solo version of this song was later included on Miracle. New collaborators on the album include Grand Corps Malade, who wrote the lyrics for "La mer et l'enfant", and Stanislas with Maxime Le Forestier, who wrote "Moi quand je pleure". In 2000, Le Forestier co-wrote "Tomber", which was later recorded by Dion in English as "Ten Days" and included on A New Day Has Come. Jacques Veneruso, a longtime collaborator, wrote "Parler à mon père", the first single. He also co-produced the album and composed the arrangements for most songs. Veneruso had worked with Dion on her previous number‑one albums: 1 fille & 4 types (2003), On ne change pas (2005), and D'elles (2007). He is the author of many of her French‑language hits, including "Sous le vent", "Tout l'or des hommes", and "Je ne vous oublie pas".

Another contributor was David Gategno, who produced and wrote the music for four songs. He had previously worked with Dion on D'elles and was responsible for her French number‑one single "Et s'il n'en restait qu'une (je serais celle-là)". Sans attendre also includes a studio version of "Ne me quitte pas", which Dion performed during her Las Vegas residency show, Celine. The song was written and originally recorded by Belgian singer-songwriter Jacques Brel in 1959. The lyrics and 30‑second previews of all songs were posted on celinedion.com on 18 October 2012. According to Dion, "this album is about feelings and being close to the people who have known me a long time. I can speak to them freely without having to convince them of what I'm capable of. It's like a VIP invitation: I invite you into my home". In May 2013, the deluxe edition of Sans attendre was re-released in France, Belgium, and Switzerland, including a 56‑page notebook with drawings by Aurore Hutton, replacing the desk calendar.

== Singles ==
The first single, "Parler à mon père", was released to digital stores on 2 July 2012 and reached number one for 10 weeks in Quebec, number seven in the French-speaking part of Switzerland (Romandy), number eight in France, number 11 in Belgium's Wallonia, and number 25 in Switzerland (including the non-French-speaking areas). The music video premiered on 6 September 2012. The second single, "Le miracle", was announced on 28 October 2012, and its music video premiered on 20 November 2012. The song peaked at number one in Quebec and reached number 27 in Wallonia, and number 77 in France. Although not released as a single, "Les petits pieds de Léa" reached number 80 on the Canadian Hot 100 due to digital sales following the album's release. The third single, "Qui peut vivre sans amour?", was announced by Dion's official website on 10 February 2013, and it was sent to radio stations in Francophone countries in March 2013. The music video premiered on 19 April 2013. On 8 April 2014, "Celle qui m'a tout appris" was announced as a single supporting Dion's live release Céline une seule fois / Live 2013.

== Promotion ==
For the release of her new French-language album, Dion taped a television special, Céline Dion... Sans attendre, in Montreal on 15 October 2012, which was broadcast on 4 November 2012 on TVA. She performed selected songs from Sans attendre, including "Parler à mon père", "Je n'ai pas besoin d'amour", "Une chance qu'on s'a" with Jean-Pierre Ferland, "Celle qui m'a tout appris", "Que toi au monde", "La mer et l'enfant", and "Le miracle". Other segments of the special showed the studio recording of "Les petits pieds de Léa", Dion performing "Mille après mille" with Fred Pellerin, and a medley of her hits with Star Académie contestants. Véronic DiCaire, a Canadian imitator, also appeared on the show. The special became the most-watched program of the fall season on Quebec television, drawing 2,386,000 viewers and a 57.9% market share. As part of the promotion in Quebec, Dion also performed "Je n'ai pas besoin d'amour" on Tout le monde en parle, which aired on 11 November 2012. On 22 November 2012, she received a Bambi Award in Germany and performed "River Deep, Mountain High" and "Ne me quitte pas" during the ceremony.

A second television special, this time for France, titled Céline Dion, Le grand show, was broadcast on 24 November 2012 on France 2. Dion performed four songs from Sans attendre: "Parler à mon père", "L'amour peut prendre froid" with Johnny Hallyday, "Le miracle", and "Qui peut vivre sans amour?". The show also included performances by various artists who sang their own songs or tributes to Dion. She performed duets with Patrick Bruel on "Qui a le droit...", Florent Pagny on "J'irai où tu iras", and Michel Sardou on "Voler", and sang several of her hits. The special became the second most-watched program of the night, attracting 4,874,000 viewers and narrowly trailing Danse avec les stars, which drew 5,040,000 viewers. On 28 November 2012, during C à vous on France 5, Dion performed "La mer et l'enfant". On 2 December 2012, she appeared on Chabada on France 3 and sang three songs from Sans attendre: "Le miracle", "Ne me quitte pas" with Florent Pagny, and "Parler à mon père". She also performed duets with other artists invited to the show. The episode dedicated to Dion became a major success with 1.5 million viewers, setting a record for Chabada. Also on 2 December 2012, Dion sang "Parler à mon père" on Vivement Dimanche on France 2.

On 17 December 2012, she appeared on France 3 on a show titled Céline en toute intimité. Dion was interviewed by the host and performed selected songs from Sans attendre, including "Si je n'ai rien de toi", "Le miracle", "Attendre", and "L'amour peut prendre froid" with Johnny Hallyday. The show also included segments from the Canadian television special. On 20 December 2012, Dion was the guest of honour in another television special titled We Love Céline on NRJ 12. She performed "Parler à mon père", "Qui peut vivre sans amour?", and "Le miracle". She also performed a duet with Maurane on "Quand on n'a que l'amour" and sang "Pour que tu m'aimes encore" a cappella with Chimène Badi. Many other artists paid tribute to her by performing her songs, including Stanislas, who sang "Moi quand je pleure". During Dion's promotional visit to France in November 2012, she also recorded a performance of "Ne me quitte pas" for Simplement pour un soir, which was broadcast on 12 January 2013 on France 2. The promotion for Sans attendre concluded on 20 January 2013, when a performance of "Le miracle" filmed in November 2012 was shown on Vivement Dimanche.

Six months later, on 27 July 2013, Dion performed six songs from Sans attendre during her one-night-only concert in Quebec, titled Céline... une seule fois. Because of the album's success, she also embarked on the European Tour 2013 in November 2013, performing sold-out concerts in Belgium and France. During her visit to France in November and December 2013, Dion performed "Parler à mon père" and "Qui peut vivre sans amour?" on C'est votre vie, and "Parler à mon père" on Les chansons d'abord. Her concert Céline... une seule fois was broadcast in late December 2013 in Switzerland, France, and Belgium. She also performed "Parler à mon père" as a duet with Tal on Ce soir on chante, broadcast on 3 January 2014. The Céline... une seule fois concert, with bonus tracks recorded in Paris during the European Tour 2013, was released as Céline une seule fois / Live 2013 on 16 May 2014.

== Critical reception ==
Professional ratings
Review scores
| Source | Rating |
|---|---|
| All About Music | 7/10 stars |
| AllMusic | 3.5/5 stars |
| The Arts Desk | 3/5 stars |
| Focus | 6/10 stars |
| The Gazette | 2.5/5 stars |
| Music Story | 3/5 stars |
| Ottawa Sun | 3/5 stars |
| La Presse | 3/5 stars |
| Pure Charts | 2.5/5 stars |
| Zikeo | 3/5 stars |

Sans attendre received mixed to positive reviews from music critics. Bernard Perusse from The Gazette described the album as full of dramatic emotion, with songs addressing themes such as longing for a departed father, the cruelty of love, the healing power of tears, the waning days of an aging mother, the emotional solace sought by a single parent, the loss of a lover to war, the end of a long-standing relationship, the misery of a baby's death, and the turmoil caused by a serious argument. He praised the "lightly-orchestrated" "Moi quand je pleure" with its unusual chord structure, the "refreshingly subdued" "Parler à mon père" and "Le miracle", the "forceful attack" on Jacques Brel's "Ne me quitte pas", and the "serviceable pop" of "Les jours comme ça". However, he criticized "Qui peut vivre sans amour?" as a "quasi-arena-rock showcase" and called "Les petits pieds de Léa" an "unfortunate" composition inspired by lyricist Marianne L'Heureux's personal tragedy.

Alain de Repentigny from La Presse wrote that the album's authors and composers vary in quality, often leaving Dion to elevate the material. He suggested that working entirely with Jean-Jacques Goldman might have produced a stronger album. Repentigny praised "Celle qui m'a tout appris", written by Nina Bouraoui, calling it one of the album's best tracks. He also highlighted "Que toi au monde", written by Luc Plamondon, and described "Tant de temps" as a "beautiful" and "great vintage" song, notably different from the version released earlier in 2012 on Henri Salvador's bossa nova album of the same name. Kieron Tyler from The Arts Desk wrote that the album "isn't going to stop the world turning" but "it is good". He noted that Sans attendre embraces a glossy, modern "chanson Française" with "yearning, rolling" melodies, maintaining a consistent mid-tempo pace and taking every opportunity to "dive into a soaring chorus". He acknowledged the album's restraint, pointing to the "swirling" "Celle qui m'a tout appris", which avoids becoming a power ballad, and the "massed kiddie chorus" on "Le miracle", which remains "kept in check". He described "Je n'ai pas besoin d'amour" as an "intimate, aural swoon" and concluded that the album contains stylish modern pop that "begs to be heard beyond the world it's addressing".

Darryl Sterdan from the Ottawa Sun listed "Qui peut vivre sans amour?" and "Attendre" among the songs worth downloading. Paula Haddad from Music Story praised the playful melody of "Moi quand je pleure" and described the accordion-driven "La mer et l'enfant" as the album's most beautiful song dedicated to motherhood. Lea Hermann from Focus praised Dion's vocal performance but considered the album trivial. She picked out two standout tracks: the rock-inspired, dramatic "Qui peut vivre sans amour" and the '90s-style duet with Johnny Hallyday, "L'amour peut prendre froid". She also praised "Le miracle" with its "fresh spring-like" background vocals, the brisk opener "Parler à mon père", "Une chance qu'on s'a", which she compared to "Beauty and the Beast", the quiet and melancholic "Que toi au monde", and "Les petits pieds de Léa", whose intro resembles a music box melody. Hermann also complimented the album's "playful and girlish" cover and booklet, illustrated with hearts, children's toys, and a musical clef referencing Dion's dual life as a singer and mother. She wrote that most of the songs share this playful, girlish quality. Łukasz Mantiuk from All About Music described the album as good, quieter, and milder than D'elles, yet charming. He listed "Qui peut vivre sans amour?", "Si je n'ai rien de toi", "Le miracle", "Parler à mon père", and "Ne me quitte pas" among the best tracks, but criticized the duets for being too similar to one another.

Jonathan Hamard from Pure Charts called "Si je n'ai rien de toi" one of the album's most enjoyable songs. He noted that themes of life and death intertwine in tracks such as "Les petits pieds de Léa" and "Parler à mon père". While he found the melodies generally successful, he felt that several new songs lacked character. He described "Le miracle" as "one big ray of sunshine" but not very original, similar to "Celle qui m'a tout appris", "Que toi au monde", and "Une chance qu'on s'a". Hamard also wrote that the duets left him "hungry for more" and concluded that the album is uneven and inconsistent, possibly due to the large number of writers and producers involved. Marty Tobin from Quai Baco also described the album as uneven, with both strong and superfluous tracks. He praised "Parler à mon père" for its composition and production by Jacques Veneruso, and "Le miracle" for its effective use of choir and "Céline's touch". He considered "Moi quand je pleure", written by Maxime Le Forestier and Stanislas, the album's best song. Among the weaker tracks, he cited "Attendre", which he felt failed to leave a lasting impression. Stephen Thomas Erlewine of AllMusic gave the album three and a half stars out of five, calling it a moody collection. He wrote that the relatively restrained production gives Dion space to "grandstand on these tales of heartbreak, aging, and death". He noted that the songs focus on loss rather than love and found "genuine pathos" in them. Erlewine considered Sans attendre one of Dion's best albums in recent years.

== Commercial reception ==
In Canada, Sans attendre entered the albums chart at number one with sales of 92,135 copies, including 88,206 units sold in Quebec alone. Sans attendre achieved the second-largest one-week sales total in 2012, trailing Taylor Swift's Red by fewer than 450 copies. It also marked Dion's best debut week since One Heart sold 97,000 units in 2003, and the strongest first-week total for a Canadian artist since 2006, when Gregory Charles sold 93,000 copies of I Think of You. Sans attendre achieved the second-highest one-week sales for a Francophone album in the SoundScan era, behind the first Star Académie release, which sold 174,000 units in its 2003 debut week. In its second week, the album fell to number two with sales of 28,000 copies. The following week, it dropped to number three, and on 26 November 2012, Sans attendre was certified triple platinum in Canada for shipments of 240,000 units. In the fourth week, it rose to number two, and the next week it fell to number four. After five weeks, Sans attendre ranked number seventeen on Billboard's Canadian Albums Year-End Chart for 2012. In the sixth week, it fell to number seven, and the following week it climbed to number six. In the eighth and final week of 2012, the album dropped to number 10. On the SoundScan Canadian Albums Year-End Chart of 2012, which included only eight weeks of sales, Sans attendre placed at number five with 209,000 copies sold, including 198,500 units in Quebec alone. The album spent nine weeks at number one on the Quebec Albums Chart. As of July 2013, the album had shipped more than 300,000 copies in Canada.

In France, the album debuted at number one with sales of 95,569 copies. It became the second-biggest debut of 2012, behind Le bal des Enfoirés by Les Enfoirés. In the second week, Sans attendre fell to number two with sales of 48,109 units, dethroned by Johnny Hallyday's L'attente, which includes the duet "L'amour peut prendre froid" with Dion. On 24 November 2012, during a French television special, Dion received a triple platinum award for shipments of 300,000 copies in France. In the third week, the album sold 35,910 units and fell to number four. The following week, after the television special, it rose to number three with sales of 57,643 copies. In the fifth week, it remained at number three with sales of 65,220 units. The next week, it climbed to number two with sales of 77,835 copies. In the seventh week, just before Christmas, Sans attendre returned to number one with its highest weekly sales of 140,718 units, the second-best weekly total of 2012. In the final week of 2012, it fell to number two with sales of 47,605 copies. After eight weeks, it became the best-selling physical album of 2012 in France and the second best-selling album overall, with total sales of 568,609 units. On 31 December 2012, it was certified diamond for sales exceeding 500,000 copies. In the first four weeks of 2013, Sans attendre remained at number two with weekly sales of 20,397, 13,929, 10,323, and 9,854 copies, respectively. In the fifth week of 2013, it fell to number four with sales of 7,905 units. In the 14th week, it dropped to number five with sales of 7,068 copies. The following week, it fell to number eight with sales of 7,200 units, bringing total sales to 645,285 copies. As of November 2013, Sans attendre had shipped more than 800,000 copies in France, making it one of the best-selling albums of recent years.

The album also reached number one in Belgium's Wallonia for five non-consecutive weeks, and number one in the French-speaking region of Switzerland (Romandy). It peaked at number two in Switzerland (including non-French-speaking areas) and Taiwan, number eight in Poland and South Korea, and was certified platinum in Belgium, and gold in Switzerland and Poland. After six weeks, it appeared on the 2012 year-end charts in Wallonia (number four) and Switzerland (number 39). As of November 2013, Sans attendre had sold more than 1.5 million copies worldwide.

== Accolades ==
In January 2013, Dion was nominated for Female Artist of the Year at the Victoires de la Musique, but the award went to Lou Doillon. In February 2013, she received three nominations at the Juno Awards of 2013, including Album of the Year (Sans attendre), Adult Contemporary Album of the Year (Sans attendre), and the Fan Choice Award. In March 2013, Dion was also nominated in four categories at the World Music Awards: World's Best Female Artist, World's Best Live Act, World's Best Entertainer of the Year, and World's Best Album for Sans attendre.

In September 2013, she received six nominations at the Félix Awards: Female Artist of the Year, Most Successful Quebecois Artist Outside Quebec, Most Popular Song of the Year ("Parler à mon père"), Adult Contemporary Album of the Year (Sans attendre), Best-Selling Album of the Year (Sans attendre), and Music Television Show of the Year (for the television special Céline Dion... Sans attendre). Sans attendre won two Félix Awards in October 2013: Adult Contemporary Album of the Year and Best-Selling Album of the Year.

== Track listing ==
Standard edition
| No. | Title | Writer(s) | Producer(s) | Length |
|---|---|---|---|---|
| 1. | "Parler à mon père" | Jacques Veneruso | Veneruso; Patrick Hampartzoumian | 2:55 |
| 2. | "Le miracle" | Marie Bastide; Gioacchino Maurici | Veneruso; Hampartzoumian | 3:57 |
| 3. | "Qui peut vivre sans amour?" | Élodie Hesme; David Gategno | Julien Schultheis; Gategno | 3:29 |
| 4. | "L'amour peut prendre froid" (with Johnny Hallyday) | Christophe Miossec; Todd Wright; Mary Ann Redmond | Yvan Cassar | 3:29 |
| 5. | "Attendre" | Hesme; Gategno | Gategno | 3:28 |
| 6. | "Une chance qu'on s'a" (with Jean-Pierre Ferland) | Ferland; Alain Leblanc | Scott Price | 3:32 |
| 7. | "La mer et l'enfant" | Grand Corps Malade; Gategno | Gategno | 3:09 |
| 8. | "Moi quand je pleure" | Maxime Le Forestier; Stanislas | Stanislas | 3:51 |
| 9. | "Celle qui m'a tout appris" | Nina Bouraoui; Veneruso | Veneruso; Thierry Blanchard | 3:48 |
| 10. | "Je n'ai pas besoin d'amour" | Ferland; Daniel Mercure | Veneruso; Blanchard | 3:32 |
| 11. | "Si je n'ai rien de toi" | Hesme; Gategno | Gategno | 4:01 |
| 12. | "Que toi au monde" | Luc Plamondon; Davide Esposito | Veneruso; Blanchard | 3:51 |
| 13. | "Tant de temps" (with Henri Salvador) | Sylvain Lebel; Christian Loigerot | Veneruso; Blanchard | 4:07 |
| 14. | "Les petits pieds de Léa" | Marianne L'Heureux; Sophie Vaillancourt | Price | 4:00 |
| Total length: | | | | 51:09 |

Deluxe edition
| No. | Title | Writer(s) | Producer(s) | Length |
|---|---|---|---|---|
| 15. | "Ne me quitte pas" | Jacques Brel | Claude Lemay | 4:18 |
| 16. | "Les jours comme ça" | François Welgryn; William Rousseau; Rod Janois | Veneruso; Hampartzoumian | 3:04 |
| Total length: | | | | 58:31 |

== Personnel ==
Adapted from AllMusic.

- Celine Dion – lead vocals
- John C. Arnold – violin
- Stéphane Aubin – piano, keyboards, programming
- Michel Aymé – guitars
- Svetlin Belneev – violin
- Denis Benarrosh – percussion
- Thierry Blanchard – producer, arranger, piano, keyboards, programming, engineering
- Marc Berthoumieux – accordion
- Audrey Bocahut – harp
- Jean-Sébastien Carré – violin
- Yvan Cassar – producer, piano
- Raphaël Chassin – drums, percussion
- Eric Chevalier – programming
- Choeurs du Studio Meyes de La Ciotat – background vocals
- Bob Clearmountain – engineering
- Laurent Coppola – drums
- Irena Z. Chirkova – cello
- Lisa D. Donlinger – violin
- Mathieu Dulong – assistant engineer
- Jean-François Durez – percussion
- Philippe Dunnigan – violin solo
- Jenny K. Elfving – violin
- Delphine Elbé – background vocals
- David Diffon – assistant engineer
- Ensemble Philippe Dunnigan – strings and horns
- Ryan Freeland – engineering
- François Gauthier – engineering
- David Gategno – producer, piano, keyboards, guitars, percussion, programming, engineering
- Jerome G. Gordon – violin
- Emmanuel Guerrero – piano
- Lenka Hajkova – violin
- André Hampartzoumian – electric guitars
- Patrick Hampartzoumian – producer, arranger, percussion, background vocals, programming, engineering
- Jean-Marc Haroutiounian – bass
- Raymond Holzknecht – assistant engineer
- Pierre Jaconelli – guitars
- Laraine Renée Kaiser – violin
- Freddy Koella – guitars
- Dimitri Kourka – violin
- François Lalonde – engineering
- Marc Langis – bass
- Claude Lemay – producer, arranger, piano, orchestration, conductor
- Deann Letourneau – violin
- Stéphane Levy – engineering
- Christian Loigerot – engineering
- Sean O'Dyer – assistant engineer
- Paul Picard – percussion
- Paris Pop Orchestra – orchestra
- Kalia A. Potts – violin
- Scott Price – producer, arranger, piano, keyboards
- Agnès Puget – background vocals
- Rebecca Ramsey – violin
- Stanislas – producer, conductor, orchestrator
- Stéphane Rullière – violin solo
- Zizou Sadki – bass
- Denis Savage – engineering
- Julien Schultheis – producer, arranger, piano, keyboards, drums, programming
- Raymond Bill Sicam – cello
- Jeff Smallwood – guitars
- Emilie Smill – background vocals
- Dominique Spagnolo – piano
- Lindsey Springer – cello
- Cyril Tarquiny – guitars
- Jean-Michel Tavernier – horn
- Eric Tewalt – flute
- Laurent Vernerey – bass
- Jacques Veneruso – producer, arranger, guitars, ukulele, background vocals

== Charts ==
=== Weekly charts ===
Weekly chart performance
| Chart (2012) | Peak position |
|---|---|
| Austrian Albums (Ö3 Austria) | 47 |
| Belgian Albums (Ultratop Flanders) | 19 |
| Belgian Albums (Ultratop Wallonia) | 1 |
| Canadian Albums (Billboard) | 1 |
| Czech Albums (ČNS IFPI) | 32 |
| Dutch Albums (Album Top 100) | 20 |
| Finnish Albums (Suomen virallinen lista) | 40 |
| French Albums (SNEP) | 1 |
| German Albums (Offizielle Top 100) | 44 |
| Greek Albums (IFPI) | 11 |
| Hungarian Albums (MAHASZ) | 13 |
| Italian Albums (FIMI) | 20 |
| Polish Albums (ZPAV) | 8 |
| Portuguese Albums (AFP) | 27 |
| Quebec (ADISQ) | 1 |
| South Korean Albums (Circle) | 56 |
| South Korean International Albums (Circle) | 8 |
| Swedish Albums (Sverigetopplistan) | 49 |
| Swiss Albums (Schweizer Hitparade) | 2 |
| Swiss Albums (Romandie) | 1 |
| UK Albums (OCC) | 158 |

=== Year-end charts ===
2012 year-end chart performance
| Chart (2012) | Position |
|---|---|
| Belgian Albums (Ultratop Wallonia) | 4 |
| Canadian Albums (Billboard) | 17 |
| Canadian Albums (SoundScan) | 5 |
| French Physical Albums (SNEP) | 1 |
| French Physical and Digital Albums (SNEP) | 2 |
| Quebec (ADISQ) | 1 |
| Swiss Albums (Schweizer Hitparade) | 39 |

2013 year-end chart performance
| Chart (2013) | Position |
|---|---|
| Belgian Albums (Ultratop Flanders) | 182 |
| Belgian Albums (Ultratop Wallonia) | 10 |
| Canadian Albums (Billboard) | 13 |
| French Albums (SNEP) | 22 |
| Swiss Albums (Schweizer Hitparade) | 35 |

2014 year-end chart performance
| Chart (2014) | Position |
|---|---|
| Belgian Albums (Ultratop Wallonia Mid Price) | 23 |

=== All-time charts ===
All-time chart performance
| Chart | Position |
|---|---|
| Canadian Artists Albums (SoundScan) | 77 |

== Certifications and sales ==
Certifications
| Region | Certification | Certified units/sales |
|---|---|---|
| Belgium (BRMA) | Platinum | 30,000^{*} |
| Canada (Music Canada) | 3× Platinum | 300,000 |
| France (SNEP) | Diamond | 800,000 |
| Poland (ZPAV) | Gold | 10,000^{*} |
| Switzerland (IFPI Switzerland) | Gold | 10,000^{^} |
Summaries
| Worldwide | — | 1,500,000 |
^{*} Sales figures based on certification alone.^{^} Shipments figures based on certification alone.

== Release history ==
Release history
| Region | Date | Label | Format | Catalog |
|---|---|---|---|---|
| Austria; Belgium; Germany; Switzerland | 2 November 2012 | Columbia | CD | 88725453152 (standard edition); 88725457462 (deluxe edition with calendar) |
| Australia; Canada; France; United Kingdom | 5 November 2012 | Columbia | CD | 88725453152 (standard edition); 88725457462 (deluxe edition with calendar) |
| Belgium; Switzerland | 10 May 2013 | Columbia | CD | 88883722352 (deluxe edition with notebook) |
| France | 13 May 2013 | Columbia | CD | 88883722352 (deluxe edition with notebook) |
| Various | 1 September 2017 | Columbia | Vinyl LP | 8 87254 57461 3 (deluxe edition) |

== See also ==
- Félix Award
- List of best-selling albums in France
- List of number-one albums of 2012 (Canada)
- List of number-one singles of 2012 (France)
