= Celle qui m'a tout appris =

Promotional single by Celine Dion

from the album Céline une seule fois / Live 2013
- Language: French
- Released: 8 April 2014
- Recorded: 2012
- Studio: Echo Beach (Jupiter); Hauts de Gammes (Paris)
- Genre: Pop
- Length: 3:48
- Label: Columbia
- Songwriters: Nina Bouraoui; Jacques Veneruso
- Producers: Jacques Veneruso; Thierry Blanchard

Music video
- "Celle qui m'a tout appris" on YouTube

Celle qui m'a tout appris (lit. 'The one who taught me everything') is a song recorded by Canadian singer Celine Dion. Released in April 2014 as a promotional single from Céline une seule fois / Live 2013, it was written by Nina Bouraoui and Jacques Veneruso and produced by Veneruso and Thierry Blanchard. The studio version first appeared on Dion's 2012 album Sans attendre. The track received positive reviews from music critics.

== Background and release ==
On 18 October 2012, Dion's official website published lyrics and 30‑second previews for all songs from Sans attendre. "Celle qui m'a tout appris" became available as a digital download in early November 2012.

On 8 April 2014, the song was sent to French radio as the fourth single from Sans attendre and simultaneously promoted as the lead single from Céline une seule fois / Live 2013. It was released to Canadian radio on 29 April 2014.

== Composition ==
The song was written by Nina Bouraoui and Jacques Veneruso, with production by Veneruso and Thierry Blanchard. Bouraoui had previously contributed lyrics to D'elles (2007), including "Immensité" and "Les paradis". Veneruso, a long‑time collaborator, has written and produced several of Dion's French‑language hits, including "Sous le vent", "Tout l'or des hommes", "Contre nature", "Je ne vous oublie pas", "Tous les secrets", and "Immensité". On Sans attendre, he also wrote the successful lead single "Parler à mon père" and produced seven tracks. Blanchard co‑produced "A cause" on D'elles and four songs on Sans attendre, including "Celle qui m'a tout appris". The song is a tribute to Dion's mother, Thérèse Dion.

== Critical reception ==
The song received positive reviews from critics. Alain de Repentigny of La Presse described it as one of the album's standout moments. Kieron Tyler of The Arts Desk praised its restraint, calling it a "swirling" composition that focuses on melody and atmosphere rather than becoming a power ballad.

== Music video ==
On 6 May 2014, Dion's official Vevo channel uploaded a live performance of the song. The footage was taken from her sold‑out Celine... une seule fois concert in Quebec City on 27 July 2013.

== Live performances ==
Dion first performed the song during the Quebec television special Céline Dion... Sans attendre, broadcast on 4 November 2012. She later included it in the Céline... une seule fois concert in Quebec City on 27 July 2013 and performed it throughout the Sans attendre Tour, which began in Belgium on 21 November 2013 and concluded in France on 5 December 2013.

== Charts ==
Chart performance
Chart (2014)	Peak position
Belgium (Ultratip Bubbling Under Wallonia)	6
Quebec Radio Songs (ADISQ)	27

== Credits and personnel ==
=== Recording ===
- Vocal recording at Echo Beach Studios, Jupiter, Florida
- Mixed at Hauts de Gammes Studio, Paris

=== Personnel ===
- Nina Bouraoui – songwriting
- Jacques Veneruso – songwriting, guitars, background vocals
- Thierry Blanchard – production and arrangements, recording, mixing, keyboards, programming
- François Lalonde – vocal recording
- Ray Holznecht – recording assistant
- Cyril Tarquiny – guitars
- Emanuel Guerrero – piano
- Laurent Coppola – drums
- Jean-Marc Haroutiounian – bass
- Agnès Puget – background vocals
- Delphine Elbé – background vocals

== Release history ==
Release history
Region	Date	Format	Label	Ref.
France	8 April 2014	Contemporary hit radio	Columbia	
Canada	29 April 2014	Contemporary hit radio	Columbia	
Italy	9 May 2014	Contemporary hit radio	Columbia	
