= Céline une seule fois / Live 2013 =

Live album by Celine Dion
- Released: 16 May 2014
- Recorded: 27 July 2013; 26 November 2013
- Venues: Plains of Abraham (Quebec City); AccorHotels Arena (Paris)
- Genre: Pop
- Length: 126:42
- Languages: French; English
- Label: Columbia
- Director: Jean Lamoureux
- Producer: Julie Snyder

Celine Dion chronology
Loved Me Back to Life (2013)	Céline une seule fois / Live 2013 (2014)	Encore un soir (2016)

Celine Dion video chronology
Taking Chances World Tour: The Concert (2010)	Céline une seule fois / Live 2013 (2014)	I Am: Celine Dion (2024)

Céline une seule fois / Live 2013 (lit. 'Celine only once / live 2013') is a live album and home video by Canadian singer Celine Dion. It was released by Columbia Records on 16 May 2014 as a three-disc set (2CD/DVD and 2CD/Blu-ray). The album and video were recorded on 27 July 2013 on the historic Plains of Abraham in Quebec City during the one-night-only Céline... une seule fois show. The CD also includes four bonus tracks recorded in Paris during Dion's sold-out European Tour 2013 in November and December 2013.

"Celle qui m'a tout appris" was issued as a promotional single in April 2014 to support the release. The trailer for Céline une seule fois / Live 2013 premiered on 28 April 2014, and the music video for "Celle qui m'a tout appris" was released on 6 May 2014. Céline une seule fois / Live 2013 reached the top 10 on album charts in France, Canada, Belgium's Wallonia, and China.

== Background ==
On 29 March 2013, Dion's official website announced that the singer would perform on the Plains of Abraham in Quebec City on 27 July 2013. A 2 April 2013 press release stated that Dion was preparing a one-time special event for Quebec City, her only show outside the Las Vegas area. She would perform her greatest hits in a show titled Céline... une seule fois, with a set composed of 80% French songs and 20% English songs. On 16 April 2013, it was revealed that Dion would perform songs dating back to her 1987 album Incognito, as well as hits from D'eux and tracks from her 2012 album Sans attendre. Dion had previously performed on the Plains of Abraham on 22 August 2008 before 250,000 spectators, and a DVD of that concert, titled Céline sur les Plaines, was released on 11 November 2008.

On 23 April 2013, another press release announced that Dion would return to France and Belgium in November 2013 for a limited number of shows, the only ones scheduled in Europe following her 2008 Taking Chances World Tour. The tour was organised to celebrate the success of Sans attendre, which sold over 1.5 million copies worldwide. The set list for the Céline... une seule fois concert was revealed on 24 May 2013. On 19 June 2013, after selling out all seven dates of the Sans attendre Tour in Belgium and France, Dion added another concert on 4 December 2013, and later a ninth and final date.

Céline... une seule fois was planned for 60,000 attendees, but to ensure comfort and safety, only 42,495 tickets were made available, and all sold out. It took 10,000 hours to install the stage, which measured 224 ft (68 m) long by 86 ft (26 m) wide and weighed 300,000 pounds (136 tons), making it the largest stage in Canada. Dion chose a rock-inspired look with elements of glamour, wearing creations by Balmain, Atelier Versace, Elie Saab, and Alexandre Vauthier. The actual set list performed in Quebec City differed slightly from the one published before the event. Dion did not perform "Rolling in the Deep", "The Prayer", or "Regarde-moi" from D'eux out of respect for the victims of the recent Lac-Mégantic derailment, as the song's lyrics reference a train going out of control. Instead, she performed "Loved Me Back to Life", "Ce n'était qu'un rêve", and Félix Leclerc's "Bozo". While in Quebec City, Dion was presented with the Companion of the Order of Canada, the country's highest civilian honour, by the Governor General in a ceremony at the Citadel.

On 8 August 2013, René Angélil and Dion announced that many elements from the Quebec concert would be incorporated into the European shows, with much of the same repertoire used in a different format. In Europe, Dion did not perform "Ce n'était qu'un rêve", "Bozo", "Je n'ai pas besoin d'amour" from Sans attendre, or the "Je danse dans ma tête/Des mots qui sonnent/Incognito" medley. Instead, she performed "Where Does My Heart Beat Now", "Water and a Flame", "At Seventeen", "Un garçon pas comme les autres (Ziggy)", "Regarde-moi", "Tout l'or des hommes", "Je ne vous oublie pas", and "Immensité".

== Content ==
On 14 April 2014, Dion's official website announced that the one-night-only Céline... une seule fois show on the historic Plains of Abraham in Quebec City would be released on 19 May 2014. The set, titled Céline une seule fois / Live 2013, includes a DVD/Blu-ray of the full concert and two live CDs, which also contain four bonus tracks from Dion's 2013 sold-out Paris shows. The show opens with "Ce n'était qu'un rêve", Dion's debut single from 1981, and includes many of her best-known songs, including tracks from her commercially successful French-language album Sans attendre and the world debut of the single "Loved Me Back to Life" from her album of the same name, released later that year. Recorded shortly after the Lac-Mégantic derailment, Dion dedicated the performance to the victims of the train crash that killed 47 people on 6 July 2013. The four bonus tracks are "Tout l'or des hommes", "Un garçon pas comme les autres (Ziggy)", "Water and a Flame", and "Regarde-moi" from D'eux. The concert also includes a duet with Jean-Marc Couture on "J'irai où tu iras". Couture, winner of Star Académie in 2012, also served as the opening act for Céline... une seule fois. The performance of "Loved Me Back to Life" was used as the music video for the single and was released on 18 September 2013.

== Singles ==
"Celle qui m'a tout appris" was issued as a promotional single from Céline une seule fois / Live 2013. On 8 April 2014, it was sent to radio in France. On 29 April 2014, the song was also released to Canadian radio stations. The music video for "Celle qui m'a tout appris", taken from the Céline... une seule fois concert, was uploaded to Dion's official Vevo channel on 6 May 2014.

== Promotion ==
On 10 August 2013, Céline... une seule fois became available on Quebec's Vidéotron pay TV and pay-per-view (PPV). On 29 November 2013, the concert, re-titled Celine Dion Only Once, was broadcast in Latin America on DirecTV (Argentina, Chile, Colombia, Ecuador, Peru, and Venezuela). In December 2013, it was also broadcast on three European channels: Swiss RTS Deux (24 December), French D8 (25 December), and Belgian La Une (31 December; rebroadcast on 5 January 2014). On 20 April 2014, Céline... une seule fois was broadcast on TVA in Canada. It was later nominated for the Félix Award for Television Show of the Year – Music, but lost to La Voix. The trailer for Céline une seule fois / Live 2013 was uploaded to Dion's official Vevo channel on 28 April 2014. Four days later, Dion's official website released photos from the Céline une seule fois / Live 2013 booklet.

== Commercial performance ==
Céline une seule fois / Live 2013 was released in selected countries as an audio/video combo but charted only on album charts. It reached the top 10 in France (number two), Belgium's Wallonia (number four), Canada (number ten on the Canadian Albums Chart and number four in Quebec), and China (number one on the Western Albums Chart and number three on the Overall Albums Chart). In France, the album sold 18,547 copies in its first week and debuted at number two, behind Coldplay's Ghost Stories. In Canada, it sold 5,319 units in its first week and entered the Canadian Albums Chart at number 10.

In the second week, the album fell to number three in France with sales of 10,271 copies, and dropped to number 14 in Canada with 2,032 units sold. In its third and fourth weeks in France, Céline une seule fois / Live 2013 fell to number eight and 14, selling 5,200 and 4,500 copies respectively. The album was certified gold in 2014. It also reached number 11 on the main chart in Switzerland (and number five on the Romandy chart), and peaked inside the top 40 in the Netherlands, Belgium's Flanders, Italy, and on the Korean International Albums Chart.

== Track listing ==
Disc one
No.	Title	Writer(s)	Length
1.	"Ce n'était qu'un rêve"	Thérèse Dion; Celine Dion; Jacques Dion	1:37
2.	"Dans un autre monde"	Jean-Jacques Goldman	4:09
3.	"Parler à mon père"	Jacques Veneruso	3:00
4.	"It's All Coming Back to Me Now" / "The Power of Love"	Jim Steinman; Gunther Mende; Candy DeRouge; Jennifer Rush; Mary Susan Applegate	9:26
5.	"On ne change pas"	Goldman	4:27
6.	"Destin"	Goldman	3:17
7.	"Qui peut vivre sans amour?"	Élodie Hesme; David Gategno	3:26
8.	"Je crois toi"	Goldman	5:41
9.	"La mer et l'enfant"	Grand Corps Malade; Gategno	3:07
10.	"Celle qui m'a tout appris"	Nina Bouraoui; Veneruso	3:52
11.	"Terre"	Erick Benzi	4:05
12.	"J'irai où tu iras" (with Jean-Marc Couture)	Goldman	3:42
13.	"Bozo"	Félix Leclerc	3:08
14.	"Je n'ai pas besoin d'amour"	Jean-Pierre Ferland; Daniel Mercure	3:51
15.	"S'il suffisait d'aimer"	Goldman	4:40
16.	"L'amour existe encore"	Luc Plamondon; Riccardo Cocciante	4:15
Total length:			65:43

Disc two
No.	Title	Writer(s)	Length
1.	"All by Myself"	Eric Carmen; Sergei Rachmaninoff	4:50
2.	"Je sais pas"	Goldman; J. Kapler	6:10
3.	"Je danse dans ma tête" / "Des mots qui sonnent" / "Incognito"	Plamondon; Romano Musumarra; Aldo Nova; Marty Simon; Jean Roussel	8:14
4.	"Love Can Move Mountains" / "River Deep, Mountain High"	Diane Warren; Ellie Greenwich; Jeff Barry; Phil Spector	6:07
5.	"My Heart Will Go On"	James Horner; Will Jennings	6:41
6.	"Pour que tu m'aimes encore"	Goldman	5:08
7.	"Loved Me Back to Life"	Sia Furler; Hasham Hussain; Denarius Motes	4:47
8.	"Le miracle"	Marie Bastide; Gioacchino Maurici	4:33
9.	"Tout l'or des hommes"	Veneruso	2:50
10.	"Ziggy (un garçon pas comme les autres)"	Plamondon; Michel Berger	3:46
11.	"Water and a Flame"	Francis "Eg" White; Daniel Merriweather	3:51
12.	"Regarde-moi"	Goldman	4:02
Total length:			60:59

=== Notes ===
- Disc three (DVD/Blu-ray) includes tracks 1–16 from disc one and tracks 1–8 from disc two.
- Tracks 9–12 from disc two are noted as "bonus tracks".

== Charts ==
=== Weekly charts ===
Weekly chart performance
Chart (2014)	Peak position
Austrian Albums (Ö3 Austria)	74
Belgian Albums (Ultratop Flanders)	29
Belgian Albums (Ultratop Wallonia)	4
Canadian Albums (Billboard)	10
China Albums (Sino Chart)	3
China Western Albums (Sino Chart)	1
Dutch Albums (Album Top 100)	12
French Albums (SNEP)	2
German Albums (Offizielle Top 100)	56
Greek Albums (IFPI)	42
Italian Albums (FIMI)	34
Mexican Albums (Top 100)	61
Quebec Albums (ADISQ)	4
South Korean Albums (Circle)	69
South Korean International Albums (Circle)	19
Spanish Albums (Promusicae)	91
Swiss Albums (Schweizer Hitparade)	11
Swiss Albums (Schweizer Hitparade Romandy)	5

=== Year-end charts ===
Year-end chart performance
Chart (2014)	Position
Belgian Albums (Ultratop Wallonia)	37
French Albums (SNEP)	77

== Certifications ==
Certifications
Region	Certification	Certified units/sales
France (SNEP)	Gold	50,000^{*}
^{*} Sales figures based on certification alone.

== Release history ==
Release history
Region	Date	Label	Format	Catalog
Austria; Belgium; Germany; Netherlands; Switzerland	16 May 2014	Columbia	2CD and DVD/Blu-ray; digital	88843065122; 88843065142
Canada; France	19 May 2014	Columbia	2CD and DVD/Blu-ray; digital	88843065122; 88843065142
