= List of Celine Dion concerts =

Celine Dion concerts
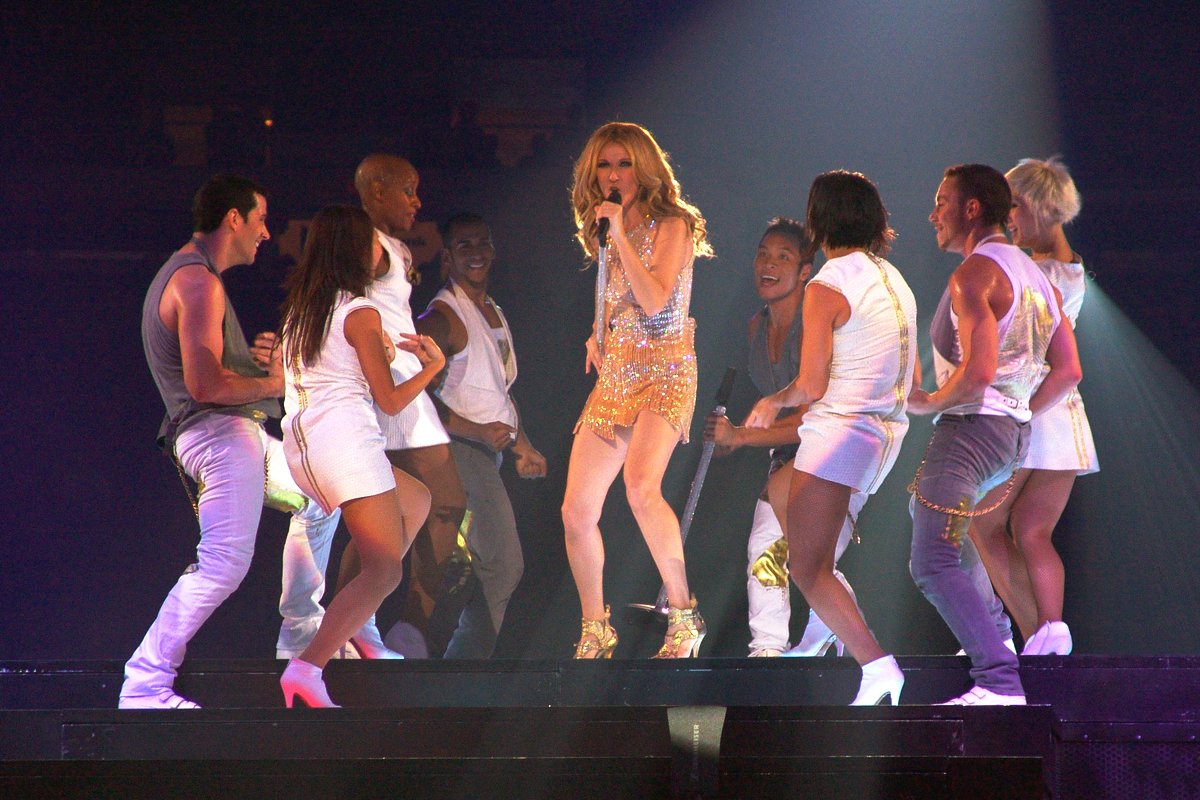
- Dion performing with her backup dancers at the Taking Chances World Tour in 2008
- Concert tours: 15
- Concert residencies: 2 (1 ongoing)
- One-off concerts: 8
- Television specials: 5

Canadian singer Celine Dion has performed on fifteen concert tours, two concert residencies, eight one-off concerts and five television specials. As of 2022, she is the sixth highest grossing touring artist of the Pollstar era with a career total gross of $1.35 billion and $10.9 million tickets sold. In 2026, Dion ranked fifth in Pollstar's top women touring artists of the 21st century based on tickets sales. She was the second woman in history to reach $1 billion in concert revenue and, as of 2019, one of the only eight artists to reach the billion-mark in Billboard Boxscore history.

Dion began her career as a teen Francophone artist and embarked on three concert tours in the 1980s. Following her foray into English-speaking music markets, she supported her debut and sophomore English-language albums with the Unison Tour and Celine Dion in Concert, visiting cities across Canada from 1990 to 1993. Dion embarked on her first world tour with The Colour of My Love Tour from 1994 to 1995, visiting North America, Europe, and Asia. She followed this with the D'eux Tour (1995–1996) and Falling into You: Around the World, where she progressively moved to large-scale stadiums. Following her increasing popularity worldwide, Dion supported her fifth English-language album with the Let's Talk About Love World Tour. It became the highest grossing tour by a female artist of the 1990s, grossing US$133 million from 97 shows. Dion then went on a two-year hiatus to focus on her family.

Following her return to music, Dion signed a US$100 million contract to perform in Las Vegas, debuting A New Day... in 2003. The show ran until 2007 and became the highest-grossing concert residency of all time, earning US$385 million. Dion did not tour again until the Taking Chances World Tour in 2008. While the critical response for the tour were mixed, it became a major success and generated a total gross of US$279.2 million, (Note: Celine Dion's Taking Chances World Tour grossed $236.6 million in 2008 and $42.6 million in 2009.) the seventh most successful concert tour of the 2000s. Dion returned to Las Vegas in 2011 for her second concert residency, Celine. A review in Variety by Richard Ouzounian said: "chanteuse's powerhouse show has wide-ranging appeal." The show, which ran until 2019, grossed US$296.2 million and at that time became the highest paid entertainer in Las Vegas. Dion then headlined the Jamaica Jazz and Blues Festival in 2012, became its most expensive headliner, and embarked on several Francophone tours to promote her albums; European Tour 2013 and Summer Tour 2016.

Dion broke venue records in the UK with Celine Dion Live 2017 and was well-received by critics with Metro contributor Tobi Akingbade stating that "her vocal ability can easily be considered the eighth wonder of the world." Dion next visited Asia and Oceania with Celine Dion Live 2018, which had its biggest engagement in Taiwan, where over 300,000 people attempted to purchase tickets simultaneously, causing a thirty-minute system crash. Dion finished the remaining dates of Celine and embarked on her first world tour in over a decade, Courage World Tour. It completed 52 shows across North America before it was suspended in March 2020 due to COVID-19 pandemic and became the highest-grossing pop tour of 2020, grossing US$104 million. After attempts to reschedule the remaining dates, the tour was officially canceled in May 2023 after Dion announced her Stiff-person syndrome diagnosis. Following an extended hiatus caused by health issues, Dion announced her return to live entertainment through Celine Dion Paris 2026, her third concert residency consisting of 26 shows. The show generated global demand, with nine million people entering a lottery for early access to tickets.

== Concert tours ==
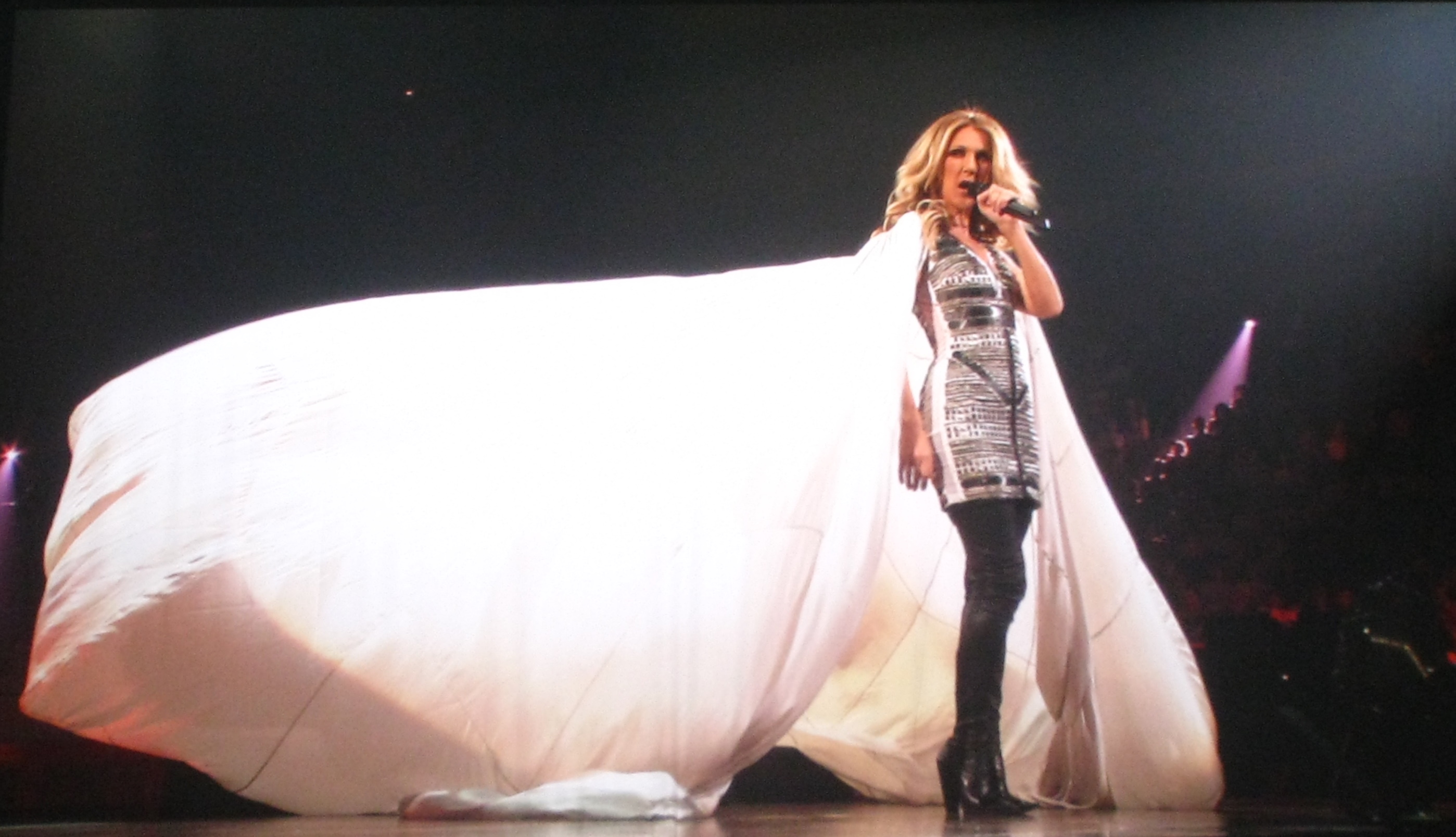
Dion performing "Eyes on Me" at the Taking Chances World Tour.

Title	Year	Recordings	Shows	Gross	Ref.
Les chemins de ma maison tournée	1983 – 1984	—N/a	40	—N/a	
Céline Dion en Concert	1985	Céline Dion en concert	42	—N/a	
Incognito tournée	1988 – 1989	—N/a	75	—N/a	
Unison Tour	1990 – 1991	Unison (video)	75	—N/a	
Celine Dion in Concert	1992 – 1993	—N/a	74	—N/a	
The Colour of My Love Tour	1994 – 1995	À l'Olympia	98	—N/a	
D'eux Tour	1995 – 1996	Live à Paris (video) Live à Paris (album)	47	—N/a	
Falling into You: Around the World	1996 – 1997	...Live in Memphis 1997	148	—N/a	
Let's Talk About Love World Tour	1998 – 1999	Au cœur du stade (video) Au cœur du stade (album)	97	$133,000,000	
Taking Chances World Tour	2008 – 2009	Celine: Through the Eyes of the World (film) Taking Chances World Tour: The Concert (video & album)	132	$279,200,000	
European Tour 2013	2013	—N/a	10	$20,000,000	
Summer Tour 2016	2016	—N/a	28	$56,000,000	
Celine Dion Live 2017	2017	—N/a	25	$63,300,000	
Celine Dion Live 2018	2018	Live 2018 in Japan (TV broadcast)	22	$56,500,000	
Courage World Tour	2019 – 2020	—N/a	52	$104,000,000	

== Concert residencies ==
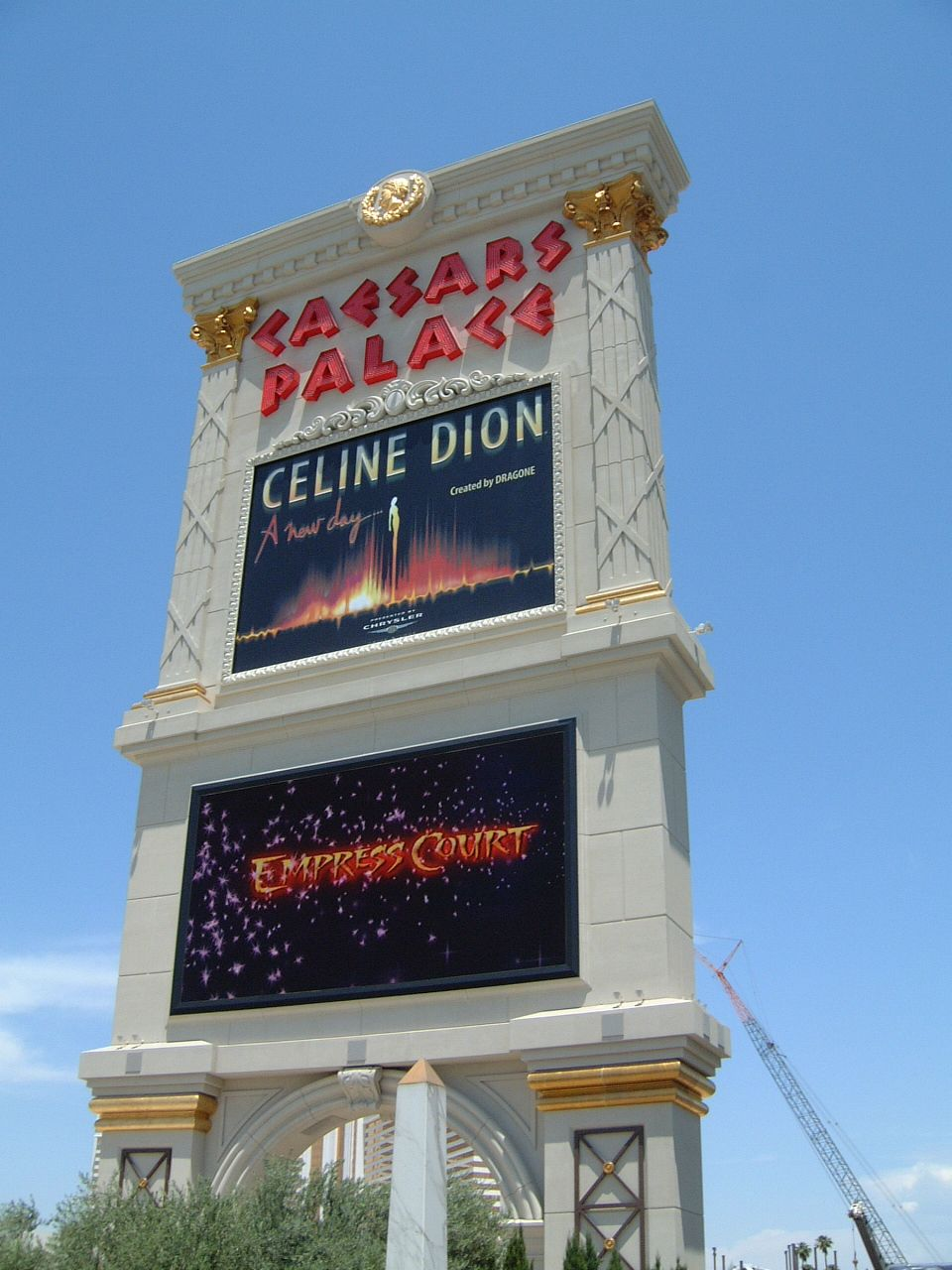
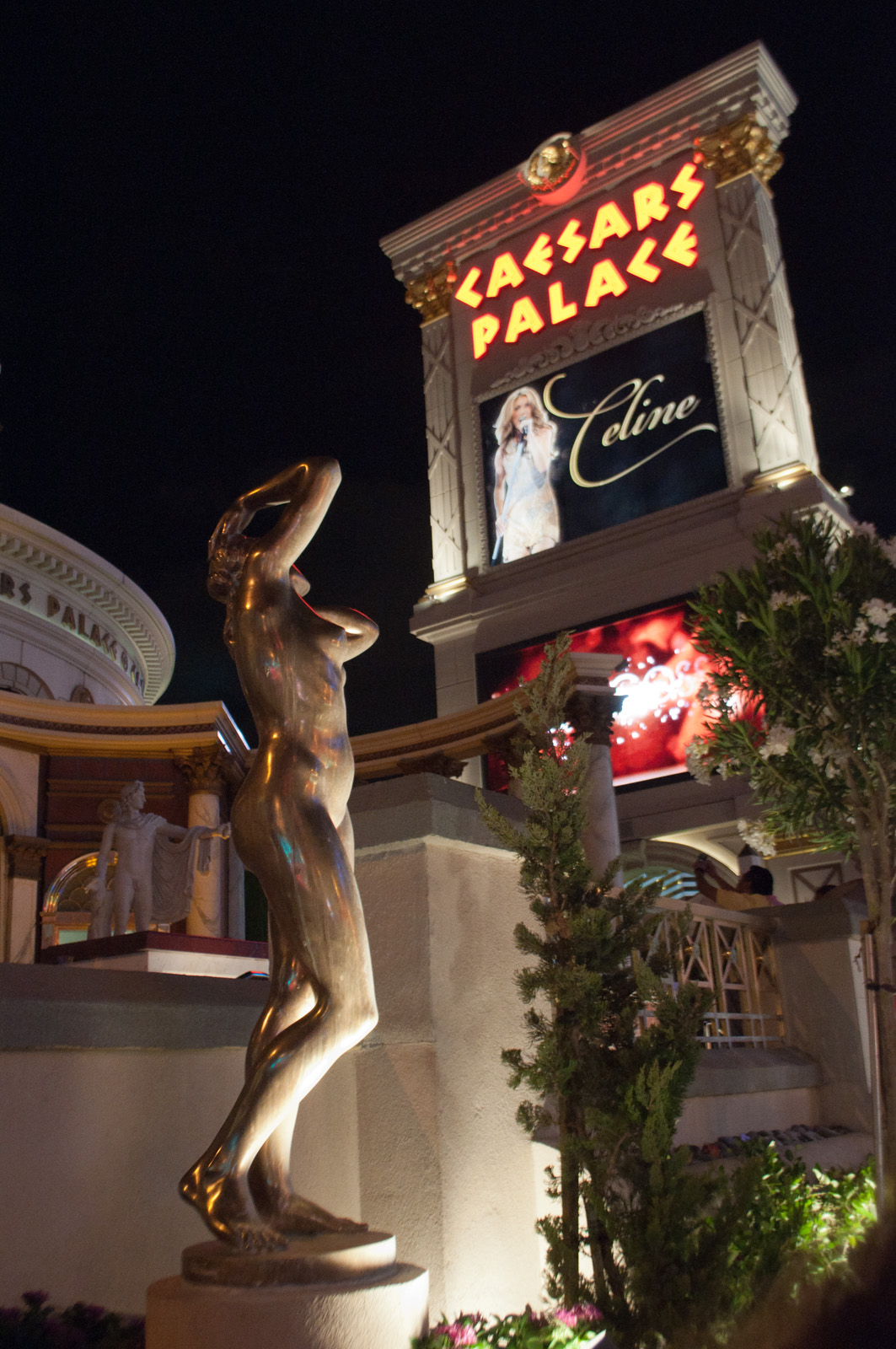
Promotional billboards of Dion's residency shows at Caesars Palace in Las Vegas.

Title	Date	Venue	No. of shows	Gross	Recording(s)	Ref.
A New Day...	25 March 2003 – 15 December 2007	The Colosseum at Caesars Palace	723	$385,000,000	A New Day... Live in Las Vegas	
A New Day...	25 March 2003 – 15 December 2007	The Colosseum at Caesars Palace	723	$385,000,000	Live in Las Vegas: A New Day...	
Celine	15 March 2011 – 8 June 2019	The Colosseum at Caesars Palace	427	$296,200,000	—N/a	
Celine Dion Paris 2026–2027	12 September – 17 October 2026, 8 – 29 May 2027	Paris La Défense Arena	26	–	—N/a	

== One-off concerts ==
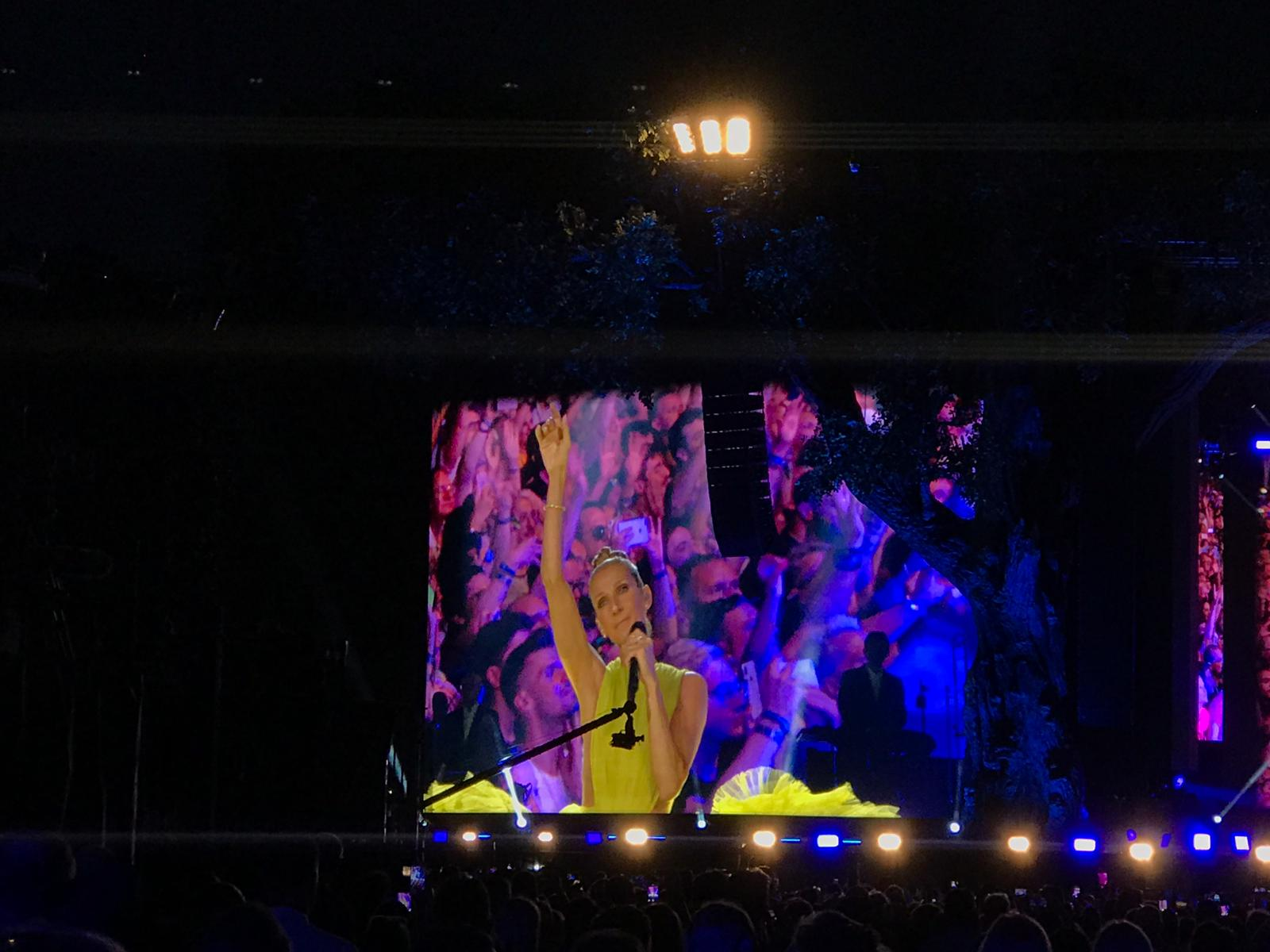
Dion performing at the British Summer Time Festival in 2019.

Title	Date	Country	Recording	Ref.
The Colour of My Love Concert	September 1993	Canada	The Colour of My Love Concert	
Celine Dion in Concert Live in Brunei	23 February 1997	Brunei	Celine Dion in Concert	
VH1 Divas Live	14 April 1998	United States	VH1 Divas Live	
VH1 Divas Las Vegas	23 May 2002	United States	VH1 Divas Las Vegas	
Céline sur les Plaines	22 August 2008	Canada	Celine sur les plaines	
Jamaica Jazz and Blues Festival	27 January 2012	Jamaica	—N/a	
Céline une seule fois	27 July 2013	Canada	Céline une seule fois / Live 2013	
Barclaycard Presents British Summer Time in Hyde Park	5 July 2019	United Kingdom	—N/a	

== Television specials ==
Event	Date	Country	Guest(s)	Ref.
These Are Special Times	25 November 1998	United States	Andrea Bocelli; Rosie O'Donnell	
All the Way... A Decade of Song	24 November 1999	United States	Gloria Estefan; NSYNC	
A New Day Has Come	7 April 2002	United States	Destiny's Child; Brian McKnight	
Celine in Las Vegas, Opening Night Live	25 March 2003	United States	Justin Timberlake (host)	
That's Just the Woman in Me	15 February 2008	United States	Will.i.am; Josh Groban; Joe Walsh	

== See also ==
- List of highest-grossing concert tours
- List of highest-grossing live music artists
- List of most-attended concert tours
- List of highest-grossing concert tours by women
