= Le miracle =

Single by Celine Dion

from the album Sans attendre
- Language: French
- Released: 2 November 2012
- Recorded: March 2012
- Studio: Echo Beach (Jupiter)
- Genre: Pop
- Length: 3:57 (album version); 3:21 (radio edit)
- Label: Columbia
- Songwriters: Marie Bastide; Gioacchino Maurici
- Producers: Jacques Veneruso; Patrick Hampartzoumian

Celine Dion singles chronology
"Parler à mon père" (2012)	"Le miracle" (2012)	"Qui peut vivre sans amour?" (2013)

Music video
- "Le miracle" on YouTube

"Le miracle" (lit. 'The miracle') is a song recorded by Canadian singer Celine Dion and released as the second single from her 2012 French‑language album Sans attendre. Written by Marie Bastide and Gioacchino Maurici and produced by Jacques Veneruso and Patrick Hampartzoumian, the track is a pop song about recognising small wonders in everyday life. Critics responded positively, noting that it stands out within the album. The music video, directed by Thierry Vergnes, presents Dion in an autumn setting and includes scenes of people jumping into the air to evoke joy.

== Background and release ==
On 18 October 2012, Dion's official website posted the lyrics and 30‑second previews of all songs from Sans attendre. On 28 October 2012, a week before the album's release, celinedion.com announced that "Le miracle" had been chosen as the second single. The song became available as a digital download on the day Sans attendre was issued. The promotional single cover was created by illustrator Aurore Hutton, niece of former French President Valéry Giscard d'Estaing.

== Composition ==
The song was written by Marie Bastide and Gioacchino Maurici and produced by Jacques Veneruso and Patrick Hampartzoumian, who had also worked on Dion's earlier single "Parler à mon père". "Le miracle" opens with a simple piano line and Dion's vocal, later joined by a children's choir. The arrangement also includes ukulele, played by Veneruso. Lyrically, the song reflects on the idea of finding small miracles in daily life and believing in them. It also conveys themes of love and hope.

== Critical reception ==
"Le miracle" received generally positive reviews from music critics. Łukasz Mantiuk of All About Music considered it one of the strongest tracks on the album, describing it as a joyful song supported by an effectively used children's choir. Bernard Perusse of The Gazette wrote that both the performance and arrangement are "refreshingly subdued" and controlled, adding that its "instantly‑accessible melody for Dion to navigate" provides a "perfect vehicle for her to sail gracefully". Kieron Tyler of The Arts Desk described the track as restrained, noting that even the "massed kiddie chorus is kept in check" and "doesn't stray into the glutinous".

Alain de Repentigny of La Presse called it a catchy pop song that can be hummed from the first listen, though he felt its charm fades quickly. Pure Charts described "Le miracle" as "one big ray of sunshine" on Sans attendre, while noting that it is not particularly original. Marty Tobin of Quai Baco remarked that the melody recalls songs heard many times since Joe Dassin, but wrote that the choir and "Celine's touch" make it effective once again. Lea Hermann of Focus also praised the track, praising its "fresh spring‑like" background vocals.

== Commercial performance ==
"Le miracle" achieved notable success in Quebec, reaching the top position on both the Top 100 Francophone and Top 25 Adult Contemporary charts in late November 2012. On 7 November 2012, the single also entered the Canadian Adult Contemporary Chart, which is dominated by English‑language releases, and later peaked at number 21. At the end of November 2012, "Le miracle" entered the charts in Belgium and France, reaching numbers 27 and 77, respectively. In December 2012, the single climbed to number 30 on the Radio Chart in Belgium's Wallonia. According to Francophonie Diffusion, "Le miracle" ranked as the 16th most‑played single worldwide in 2013 by a Francophone artist.

== Music video ==
The music video for "Le miracle" was directed by Thierry Vergnes and filmed on 2 October 2012 at a golf club in Terrebonne, Quebec. Vergnes had previously collaborated with Dion on her 2007 videos for "Et s'il n'en restait qu'une (je serais celle-là)" and "Immensité", and again in 2012 on "Parler à mon père". The video premiered on 20 November 2012. Shot under autumn sunlight, it shows Dion walking among trees with orange and red leaves, intercut with scenes of people jumping into the air to express joy. The final sequence presents a young pregnant woman, followed by a quote attributed to Albert Einstein: "There are only two ways to live your life. One is as though nothing is a miracle. The other is as though everything is a miracle". ET Canada described the video as uplifting. The video uses the radio edit of the song.

== Live performances ==
Dion performed "Le miracle" during a Canadian television special on 4 November 2012 on TVA, a French television special on 24 November 2012 on France 2, and in two programmes on France 3: Chabada on 2 December 2012 and Céline en toute intimité on 17 December 2012. On 20 December 2012, she also performed the song in a television special on NRJ 12. "Le miracle" served as the closing number of her Céline... une seule fois concert on the Plains of Abraham in Quebec City on 27 July 2013 and was one of the final songs performed at the Sportpaleis in Antwerp on 21 November 2013 during the Sans attendre Tour. The Quebec City performance was included on the Céline une seule fois / Live 2013 CD/DVD.

== Credits and personnel ==
Recording

- Dion's vocal recorded at Echo Beach Studios, Jupiter, Florida

Personnel

- Celine Dion – lead vocals
- Marie Bastide – songwriting (lyrics)
- Gioacchino Maurici – songwriting (music)
- Jacques Veneruso – production, arrangements, acoustic guitars, ukulele, background vocals
- Patrick Hampartzoumian – production, arrangements, percussion, background vocals, programming, recording, mixing
- Laurent Coppola – drums
- Jean-Marc Haroutiounian – bass
- Emmanuel Guerrero – piano
- André Hampartzoumian – electric guitars
- Agnès Puget – background vocals
- Delphine Elbé – background vocals
- Emilie Smill – background vocals
- Choeurs du Studio Meyes de La Ciotat – choir
- François Lalonde – vocal recording
- Ray Holznecht – recording assistant

== Charts ==
Chart performance
Chart (2012–2013)	Peak position
Belgium (Ultratip Bubbling Under Flanders)	53
Belgium (Ultratop 50 Wallonia)	27
Canada AC (Billboard)	21
CIS Airplay (TopHit)	197
France (SNEP)	77
Quebec Radio Songs (ADISQ)	1
Quebec Adult Contemporary (ADISQ)	1

== Release history ==
Release history
Region	Date	Format	Version	Label	Ref.
Belgium; Switzerland	2 November 2012	Contemporary hit radio	Radio edit	Columbia	
Canada; France	5 November 2012	Contemporary hit radio	Radio edit	Columbia	
