= European Tour 2013 =

2013 concert tour by Celine Dion

- Tour by Celine Dion
- Promotional poster for the tour
- Location: Belgium; France
- Associated album: Sans attendre
- Start date: 21 November 2013
- End date: 5 December 2013
- No. of shows: 9
- Box office: $25 million ($34.55 million in 2025 dollars)

Celine Dion concert chronology
- Celine (2011–2019); European Tour 2013 (2013); Summer Tour 2016 (2016)

European Tour 2013 was the eleventh concert tour by Canadian singer Celine Dion. The tour was organized to support her fourteenth French‑language and twenty‑fourth studio album, Sans attendre (2012), which sold more than 1.5 million copies worldwide. It also served as early promotion for Dion's then recently released English album, Loved Me Back to Life (2013), as she added several songs from it to the concert's setlist. It was Dion's first dedicated Francophone tour since the D'eux Tour in 1995–1996. With only ten concerts performed, it was also the shortest tour of her career. Overall, the tour grossed an estimated $20 million from nine shows in Europe. It also marked the final concert tour for most of Dion's longtime touring band members, including musical director Claude "Mego" Lemay, guitarist André Coutu, keyboardist Yves Frulla, bassist Marc Langais, and violinist Jean‑Seb Carré.

== Background ==
According to producer Gilbert Coullier, speaking on France Bleu 107.1, the European 'mini‑tour' was originally planned to cover both the Francophone and Anglophone markets, including the UK and Germany, allowing Dion to promote her latest French and English releases at the same time. However, because the English album was postponed, the Anglophone section of the tour was cancelled. The Francophone part went ahead as planned, celebrating the successful 2012 album Sans attendre in Belgium and France.

On 19 June 2013, a sixth show in Paris was announced for 4 December 2013. On 27 August 2013, a seventh Paris date was added for 5 December 2013, bringing the total number of concerts on the tour to nine.

The tour included two shows in Antwerp, Belgium, and five sold‑out concerts in Paris, France. The setlist was similar to that of Céline... une seule fois, a one‑off outdoor show in Quebec during the summer of 2013 (see below), although several adjustments were made for the European dates. "Je n'ai pas besoin d'amour", "L'amour existe encore", and the Luc Plamondon medley of "Je danse dans ma tête"/"Des mots qui sonnent" and "Incognito" were removed. New additions included two English‑language songs, "Water and a Flame" and "At Seventeen", as well as Dion's first English‑language hit from 1990, "Where Does My Heart Beat Now". Two rarely performed French singles, "Tout l'or des hommes" and "Immensité", were also added. "Regarde‑moi", planned but not performed in Quebec, was finally included in Paris, marking its first appearance on stage since the Millennium Concert. "Un garçon pas comme les autres (Ziggy) was also performed in France, repeating the pattern seen during the Taking Chances World Tour, with "L'amour existe encore" performed only in Quebec and "Ziggy" performed only in Europe.

Dion wore the same outfits in Europe as she did in Quebec during Céline... une seule fois. However, the dress used for "My Heart Will Go On" in Europe was different and remained in use until the end of each show. As a result, the white outfit with the long gold jacket worn in Quebec did not appear during the European concerts. Vincent Niclo opened for Dion in Belgium and in France.

== Broadcasts and recordings ==
All shows were professionally filmed. On 1 December 2013, "Dans un autre monde", "Parler à mon père", and "Loved Me Back to Life" were shown on Herby.tv. These performances were recorded on 29 November 2013. Various excerpts from the 5 December 2013 concert were later included on L'ete Indien. There are no current plans for a DVD release, likely because the Céline... une seule fois concert was already issued on DVD.

Céline... une seule fois was recorded professionally by Dion's recording company and was broadcast on Quebec pay‑to‑view channels from 10 August 2013. The concert was also shown on several European channels: RTS Deux in Switzerland on 24 December 2013, D8 in France on 25 December 2013, and La Une in Belgium on 31 December 2013.

On 19 May 2014, a live DVD/2‑CD set titled Céline... une seule fois / Live 2013 was released. The set includes the full Quebec concert plus four additional songs recorded on 26 November 2013 in Paris. Bonus audio tracks include "Tout l'or des hommes", "Un garçon pas comme les autres (Ziggy)", "Water and a Flame", and "Regarde‑moi". "Where Does My Heart Beat Now", "At Seventeen", "Je ne vous oublie pas", and "Immensité" were omitted, so there are no official audio or video recordings of these songs.

== Céline... une seule fois ==
Although not officially part of the European Tour 2013, Dion performed for one night only in front of 42,495 spectators in Quebec City on the Plains of Abraham on 27 July 2013. Céline... une seule fois marked Dion's second official public concert outside Las Vegas since her second residency began in March 2011; the first was in 2012 at the Jamaica Jazz and Blues Festival. It was also her second show on the Plains of Abraham, following Céline sur les Plaines in 2008, which celebrated Quebec's 400th anniversary. Unlike the 2008 concert, there were no guest performers, so the show focused entirely on Dion and her catalogue. Reports indicated that the setlist would include roughly eighty percent French material and 20 percent English material, a balance not seen since the D'eux Tour, with selections ranging from Incognito (1987) to Sans attendre (2012).

On 24 May 2013, the setlist for the concert was revealed. It included six new songs from Sans attendre and six songs not performed since either the Millennium Concert or the Let's Talk About Love World Tour in 1999. The remaining selections consisted of French songs performed during the 2008–2009 Taking Chances World Tour (except for "Et s'il n'en restait qu'une (je serais celle-là)") and English songs from Dion's Las Vegas show, Celine. Despite early reports suggesting a retrospective of her entire French‑language career, no songs from 1 fille & 4 types or D'elles were included, and none of the new recordings from the 2005 compilation On ne change pas appeared, meaning there was no material from the decade 2000–2009. At a press conference before the concert, it was stated that the European tour dates in November and December 2013 would use a similar setlist to Céline... une seule fois.

The setlist performed in Quebec differed slightly from the one published beforehand. "Ce n'était qu'un rêve" was sung a cappella as an introduction, and the title track from Dion's upcoming English album, "Loved Me Back to Life", was added at the end of the show. "J'irai où tu iras" appeared earlier than planned, followed by "Bozo". Out of respect for the victims of the recent Lac-Mégantic derailment, "Regarde-moi" was removed because its lyrics refer to a train going out of control. "Rolling in the Deep" and "The Prayer" were also not performed. Jean-Marc Couture opened for Dion in Quebec City and later joined her on "J'irai où tu iras".

=== Set list ===
1. "Ce n'était qu'un rêve" (a cappella)
2. "Dans un autre monde"
3. "Parler à mon père"
4. "It's All Coming Back to Me Now" / "The Power of Love" (medley)
5. "On ne change pas"
6. "Destin"
7. "Qui peut vivre sans amour?"
8. "Je crois toi"
9. "La mer et l'enfant"
10. "Celle qui m'a tout appris"
11. "Terre"
12. "J'irai où tu iras" (with Jean-Marc Couture)
13. "Bozo"
14. "Je n'ai pas besoin d'amour"
15. "S'il suffisait d'aimer"
16. "L'amour existe encore"
17. "All by Myself"
18. "Je sais pas"
19. "Je danse dans ma tête" /" Des mots qui sonnent" / "Incognito" (medley)
20. "Love Can Move Mountains" /" River Deep, Mountain High" (medley)
21. "My Heart Will Go On"
22. "Pour que tu m'aimes encore"
23. "Loved Me Back to Life"
24. "Le miracle"

=== Shows ===
Date (2013)	City	Country	Venue	Attendance	Revenue
27 July	Quebec City	Canada	Plains of Abraham	41,298 / 60,200	$5,670,255

== Tour dates ==
List of concerts
Date (2013)	City	Country	Venue	Attendance	Revenue
21 November	Antwerp	Belgium	Sportpaleis	28,630 / 30,730	$5,061,190
22 November	Antwerp	Belgium	Sportpaleis	28,630 / 30,730	$5,061,190
25 November	Paris	France	Palais Omnisports de Paris-Bercy	73,333 / 73,437	$14,876,447
26 November	Paris	France	Palais Omnisports de Paris-Bercy	73,333 / 73,437	$14,876,447
29 November	Paris	France	Palais Omnisports de Paris-Bercy	73,333 / 73,437	$14,876,447
30 November	Paris	France	Palais Omnisports de Paris-Bercy	73,333 / 73,437	$14,876,447
1 December	Paris	France	Palais Omnisports de Paris-Bercy	73,333 / 73,437	$14,876,447
4 December	Paris	France	Palais Omnisports de Paris-Bercy	73,333 / 73,437	$14,876,447
5 December	Paris	France	Palais Omnisports de Paris-Bercy	73,333 / 73,437	$14,876,447
Total				101,963 / 104,167 (98%)	$19,937,637

== Band ==
- Claude "Mégo" Lemay – musical director, piano
- Dominique Messier – drums
- Marc Langis – bass
- André Coutu – guitars
- Yves Frulla – keyboards
- Paul Picard – percussion
- Élise Duguay – background vocals, cello, tin whistle
- Barnev Valsaint – background vocals
- Dawn Cumberbatch – background vocals
- Jean‑Sebastien Carré – violin
- Julie McInnes – cello
- Eric Tewalt – woodwinds
- Philip Wigfall – woodwinds
- Matt Fronke – trumpets
- Kurt Evanson – trumpets
- Nico Edgerman – trumpets
- Donald Lorice – trumpets
- Daniel Falcone – trombones
- Nathan Tanouye – trombones
