= Qui peut vivre sans amour? =

Single by Celine Dion

from the album Sans attendre
- Language: French
- Released: 8 March 2013
- Recorded: March 2012
- Studio: Agathe; Omega; Echo Beach (Jupiter)
- Genre: Pop
- Length: 3:29 (album version); 3:23 (radio edit)
- Label: Columbia
- Songwriters: Elodie Hesme; David Gategno
- Producers: Julien Schultheis; David Gategno

Celine Dion singles chronology
"Le miracle" (2012)	"Qui peut vivre sans amour?" (2013)	"Loved Me Back to Life" (2013)

Music video
- "Qui peut vivre sans amour?" on YouTube

"Qui peut vivre sans amour?" (lit. 'Who can live without love?') is a song recorded by Canadian singer Celine Dion. Released as the third single from her French-language album Sans attendre (2012), it was written by Elodie Hesme and David Gategno and produced by Julien Schultheis and Gategno. Critics responded positively, describing the track as an orchestral rock power ballad. The music video premiered on 19 April 2013.

== Background and release ==
On 18 October 2012, Dion's official website published the lyrics and 30‑second previews of all songs from Sans attendre. "Qui peut vivre sans amour?" became available as a digital download on the album's release day. On 10 February 2013, celinedion.com confirmed that it would serve as the third single. On 8 March 2013, the promotional single cover created by illustrator Aurore Hutton, niece of former French President Valéry Giscard d'Estaing, was unveiled, and the song was sent to French radio. In Quebec, "Qui peut vivre sans amour?" was released to radio on 18 March 2013. The promotional edition includes a revised mix with reduced guitar and additional piano and strings. The new arrangement softens the overall sound while preserving the song's emotional weight.

== Composition ==
"Qui peut vivre sans amour?" was written by Elodie Hesme and David Gategno, with production by Julien Schultheis and Gategno. Hesme collaborated with Dion for the first time on Sans attendre, contributing lyrics to "Qui peut vivre sans amour?," "Attendre," and "Si je n'ai rien de toi". Gategno, who had previously worked with Dion on D'elles (2007) and composed her French number-one single "Et s'il n'en restait qu'une (je serais celle-là)", wrote and produced four tracks for Sans attendre: "Qui peut vivre sans amour?," "Attendre," "La mer et l'enfant," and "Si je n'ai rien de toi". Schultheis also collaborated with Dion for the first time, producing "Qui peut vivre sans amour?" and contributing instrumentation to that track as well as to "Attendre" and "Si je n'ai rien de toi".

In "Qui peut vivre sans amour?," Dion adopts a dramatic vocal approach, asking who can live without love while acknowledging its capacity to bring pain and suffering. The lyrics portray love as a force that can wound — a "plague," a "criminal," and the source of destructive "wars" — yet also as something that shapes lives and sustains dreams. The recording includes the Paris Pop Orchestra conducted by Stanislas.

== Critical reception ==
"Qui peut vivre sans amour?" received generally positive reviews from music critics. Łukasz Mantiuk of All About Music described the track as strong and feisty, calling it the standout song on Sans attendre. Lea Hermann of Focus wrote that the song is a rock‑inspired, drum‑driven and dramatic moment on the album, noting that it stands out among the other tracks. Paula Haddad of Music Story praised the production, while Darryl Sterdan of the Ottawa Sun listed the track among the songs worth downloading from Sans attendre.

Alain de Repentigny of La Presse described the track as an orchestral rock power ballad. He welcomed Dion's decision to take on a rock‑leaning song, though he felt the guitar solo sounded somewhat dated. Jonathan Hamard of Pure Charts called "Qui peut vivre sans amour?" the album's only truly dynamic track and praised its effective chorus. He also described it as "punchy" and "electric".

Marty Tobin of Quai Baco wrote that the track is essentially a "Celine Dion rock song", noting the slightly saturated guitar in the chorus and the multiple layers of violins, which he felt placed it closer to Mozart, l'opéra rock than to "Killed by Death" by Motörhead. According to Evous France, it is a rock ballad with an energetic vocal delivery, somewhat reminiscent of "Et s'il n'en restait qu'une (je serais celle-là)". Geneviève Bouchard of La Presse noted the track's prominent rock elements, while Bernard Perusse of The Gazette described it as a "quasi‑arena‑rock showcase" with a "strangely abrasive, tuneless chorus". After the single was announced, Evous France expressed a preference for other potential choices, including "Je n'ai pas besoin d'amour," "Une chance qu'on s'a," "Celle qui m'a tout appris," and "L'amour peut prendre froid".

== Commercial performance ==
"Qui peut vivre sans amour?" entered the Canadian Adult Contemporary Chart in late March 2013 and appeared on Belgium's Wallonia Ultratip Chart in mid‑April 2013. The song reached number 12 on the Wallonia Ultratip Chart and number 41 on the Canadian Adult Contemporary Chart. In Quebec, it peaked at number seven.

== Music video ==
The music video for "Qui peut vivre sans amour?" was directed by Thierry Vergnes and filmed in Las Vegas on 18 March 2013. Vergnes had previously directed the videos for two earlier singles from Sans attendre: "Parler à mon père" and "Le miracle". The video premiered on 19 April 2013. Critics responded positively, noting that it was stronger than the previous two videos from Sans attendre. The video presents several pairs of dancers who use choreography to depict different situations that lovers may encounter.

== Live performances ==
Dion performed "Qui peut vivre sans amour?" during two French television specials: Céline Dion, Le grand show on 24 November 2012 and We Love Céline on 20 December 2012. She also performed the song during the Céline... une seule fois concert in Quebec City on 27 July 2013 and throughout the Sans attendre Tour later that year; the Quebec City performance was included on the Céline une seule fois / Live 2013 CD/DVD. Dion later included "Qui peut vivre sans amour?" in the set list of her Summer Tour 2016.

== Credits and personnel ==
Recording

- Agathe Studios and Omega Studios
- Dion's vocal recorded at Echo Beach Studios, Jupiter, Florida

Personnel

- Celine Dion – lead vocals
- David Gategno – songwriting (music), production, recording, keyboards, programming
- Elodie Hesme – songwriting (lyrics)
- Julien Schultheis – production, keyboards, programming, piano, drums, strings and horns arrangement
- Stephane Levy-b – recording, mixing
- François Lalonde – vocal recording
- Ray Holznecht – recording assistant
- Zizou Sadki – bass
- Michel Aymé – guitars
- Paris Pop Orchestra – orchestra
- Stanislas – conductor
- Jean Michel Tavernier – horn

== Charts ==
Chart performance
Chart (2013)	Peak position
Belgium (Ultratip Bubbling Under Wallonia)	12
Canada AC (Billboard)	41
Quebec Radio Songs (ADISQ)	7

== Release history ==
Release history
Region	Date	Format	Version	Label	Ref.
Belgium; France; Switzerland	8 March 2013	Contemporary hit radio	Radio edit	Columbia	
Canada	18 March 2013	Contemporary hit radio	Radio edit	Columbia	
