= Parler à mon père =

Single by Celine Dion

from the album Sans attendre
- Language: French
- Released: 2 July 2012
- Recorded: February 2012
- Studio: Echo Beach (Jupiter)
- Genre: Pop
- Length: 2:55
- Label: Columbia
- Songwriter: Jacques Veneruso
- Producers: Jacques Veneruso; Patrick Hampartzoumian

Celine Dion singles chronology
"My Love" (2008)	"Parler à mon père" (2012)	"Le miracle" (2012)

Music video
- "Parler à mon père" on YouTube

"Parler à mon père" (lit. 'Talk to my father') is a song recorded by Canadian singer Celine Dion and released as the lead single from her 2012 French‑language album Sans attendre. Written by Jacques Veneruso and produced by Veneruso and Patrick Hampartzoumian, the track is a pop song reflecting on Dion's father, who died in 2003. Critics responded positively, noting that it stands out on Sans attendre. The music video, directed by Thierry Vergnes, shows Dion in a desert landscape. It became her second most viewed French‑language video on YouTube, after "Pour que tu m'aimes encore". Commercially, "Parler à mon père" was successful, reaching number one in Quebec and number eight in France, and becoming one of Dion's longest‑charting singles in France with a 63‑week run.

== Background and release ==
On 7 June 2012, Dion's official website announced that she had begun recording songs for her next French and English albums during April and May. On 29 June 2012, celinedion.com posted a 30‑second preview of the first single from the French‑language album, "Parler à mon père". The single's cover art was created by illustrator Aurore Hutton, niece of former French President Valéry Giscard d'Estaing. The full version of "Parler à mon père" premiered on 1 July 2012, and the single was released digitally in selected countries the following day. In some countries, an instrumental version was also issued.

== Composition ==
The song was written and produced by Jacques Veneruso and co‑produced by Patrick Hampartzoumian. Veneruso has written several French‑language hits for Dion, including "Sous le vent", "Tout l'or des hommes", "Je ne vous oublie pas" and "Immensité". Lyrically, the song reflects on Dion's father, who died on 30 November 2003. Dion said he had been her greatest supporter and that she thinks of him every day, believing he remains with her and watches over her children.

== Critical reception ==
"Parler à mon père" received generally positive reviews from music critics. Łukasz Mantiuk of All About Music considered it one of the strongest tracks on the album, describing it as a very good song while noting that it does not reflect the overall tone of Sans attendre, which consists mainly of ballads. Bernard Perusse of The Gazette wrote that the performance and arrangement are "refreshingly subdued" and controlled, adding that its "instantly‑accessible melody for Dion to navigate" provides a "perfect vehicle for her to sail gracefully". Alain de Repentigny of La Presse described it as a pop song written specifically for Dion, though he felt that this first single does not serve as a driving force for the album. Pure Charts wrote that "Parler à mon père" is somewhat nostalgic but not melancholic.

Marty Tobin of Quai Baco described it as a strong opener for the album, with touching lyrics and a catchy melody, adding that although the song does not introduce anything new to French pop music, it is executed effectively. Lea Hermann of Focus also praised the track, calling it a brisk opener for the album.

== Commercial performance ==
"Parler à mon père" became a major success in Quebec, where it topped the chart for 10 weeks. On the Canadian Hot 100, a chart dominated by English‑language releases, the single peaked at number 53. In Europe, it reached number eight in France, number 11 in Belgium's Wallonia, and number 25 in Switzerland. It became Dion's second longest‑charting single in France, remaining on the chart for 63 weeks. According to Francophonie Diffusion, "Parler à mon père" ranked as the 14th most‑played single worldwide in 2012 by a Francophone artist.

== Music video ==
A preview of the music video for "Parler à mon père" was posted on celinedion.com on 5 September 2012, with the full video premiering the next day. Directed by Thierry Vergnes, who had previously worked with Dion on the videos for "Et s'il n'en restait qu'une (je serais celle-là)" and "Immensité", the video was filmed in Las Vegas on 16 July 2012 and in Death Valley. Because temperatures in the Nevada desert reached 50 °C (122 °F), a body double was used for some scenes. Dion appears in a white dress from designer Elie Saab's Spring/Summer 2012 collection.

According to Pure Charts, the video adopts a simple and poetic approach. It opens with a quote from the German poet Angelus Silesius: "The soul is a crystal and love is its light". The imagery, filled with bright light, shows Dion alone in a desert landscape, intercut with a scene of a younger woman visiting her father's grave. As of April 2026, the video has accumulated more than 136 million views on YouTube.

== Live performances ==
Dion performed "Parler à mon père" during two television specials promoting the album: in Canada on 4 November 2012 on TVA, and in France on 24 November 2012 on France 2. She later performed it on Chabada on France 3 on 2 December 2012 and on Vivement Dimanche on France 2. On 20 December 2012, she also performed the song in a television special on NRJ 12. The song was also performed on 27 July 2013 during the Céline... une seule fois concert in Quebec City, and during the Sans attendre Tour in Antwerp and Paris from 21 November 2013 through 5 December 2013. The Quebec City performance was included on the Céline une seule fois / Live 2013 CD/DVD.

== Accolades ==
In 2013, "Parler à mon père" was nominated for the Félix Award in the category Most Popular Song of the Year.

== Credits and personnel ==
Recording

- Dion's vocal recorded at Echo Beach Studios, Jupiter, Florida

Personnel

- Celine Dion – lead vocals
- Jacques Veneruso – songwriting, production, arrangements, guitars, background vocals
- Patrick Hampartzoumian – production and arrangements, recording, mixing, percussion, programming
- François Lalonde – vocal recording
- Ray Holznecht – recording assistant
- Laurent Coppola – drums
- Jean-Marc Haroutiounian – bass
- Agnès Puget – background vocals
- Delphine Elbé – background vocals

== Charts ==
=== Weekly charts ===
Weekly chart performance
Chart (2012)	Peak position
Belgium (Ultratip Bubbling Under Flanders)	12
Belgium (Ultratop 50 Wallonia)	11
Canada Hot 100 (Billboard)	53
Canada AC (Billboard)	29
France (SNEP)	8
Quebec Digital Song Sales (ADISQ)	1
Quebec Radio Songs (ADISQ)	1
Quebec Adult Contemporary (ADISQ)	1
Switzerland (Schweizer Hitparade)	25
Switzerland (Media Control Romandy)	7

=== Year-end charts ===
Year-end chart performance
Chart (2012)	Position
Belgium (Ultratop 50 Wallonia)	77
France (SNEP)	77

== Certifications ==
Certifications
Region	Certification	Certified units/sales
Canada (Music Canada)	Gold	40,000^{‡}
^{‡} Sales+streaming figures based on certification alone.

== Release history ==
Release history
Region	Date	Format	Label	Ref.
Belgium; Canada; France; Switzerland	2 July 2012	Digital download	Columbia	
