= Love Me Anyway (disambiguation) =

"Love Me Anyway" is a 2019 song by Pink.

Love Me Anyway may also refer to:

- "Love Me Anyway", a 2012 song by Mary Ann Redmond, recorded as a French duet "L'amour peut prendre froid" by Celine Dion and Johnny Hallyday
- "Love Me Anyway", a 2015 song by Ginny Blackmore from her album, Over the Moon
- "Love Me Anyway", a 2019 song by Conrad Sewell from his album Life
- "Love Me Anyway", a 2020 song by Chappell Roan
