= Loved Me Back to Life (song) =

Single by Celine Dion

from the album Loved Me Back to Life
- B-side: "Loved Me Back to Life" (Dave Audé radio extended)
- Released: 3 September 2013
- Recorded: 2013
- Studio: At the Palms (Las Vegas); Larrabee Sound (North Hollywood)
- Genre: Pop; dance-pop
- Length: 3:50
- Label: Columbia
- Songwriters: Sia Furler; Hasham "Sham" Hussain; Denarius "Motesart" Motes
- Producers: Hasham "Sham" Hussain; Denarius "Motesart" Motes

Celine Dion singles chronology
"Qui peut vivre sans amour?" (2013)	"Loved Me Back to Life" (2013)	"Incredible" (2014)

Music video
- "Loved Me Back to Life" on YouTube

"Loved Me Back to Life" is a song recorded by Canadian singer Celine Dion. Issued on 3 September 2013 by Columbia Records, it served as the lead single from her eleventh English-language studio album of the same name, Loved Me Back to Life (2013). Written by Sia, Hasham "Sham" Hussain and Denarius "Motesart" Motes, and produced by Hussain and Motes, the track was supported by an official live performance video, which premiered on Vevo on 18 September 2013. "Loved Me Back to Life" drew favorable critical notices and became a top‑40 hit in several territories, peaking at number 14 in the United Kingdom, number 17 in South Korea, number 25 in Switzerland and Belgium, number 26 in Canada, number 29 in Ireland, number 32 in France, and number 38 in Germany and Austria.

== Composition and release ==
"Loved Me Back to Life" is a power ballad set in a minor key, with its chorus built around a dubstep-influenced drop. The song was written by Sia, who had previously provided vocals for David Guetta's "Titanium" and composed the lyrics and melody for Rihanna's "Diamonds". The production was handled by Hasham "Sham" Hussain and Denarius "Motesart" Motes, whose credits also include "Is Anybody Out There?" by K'naan and Nelly Furtado. "Loved Me Back to Life" premiered on radio on 3 September 2013 and was issued as a digital download on the same day. The official audio was subsequently uploaded to Dion's Vevo channel. In the United States, the track was serviced to adult contemporary radio stations on 9 September 2013, while in the United Kingdom the BBC Radio 2 Mix premiered on BBC Radio 2 on 28 September 2013. A brief making‑of feature was released on Vevo on 24 September 2013, followed in October 2013 by dance remixes from Dave Audé, David Morales, and Jump Smokers.

== Critical reception ==
"Loved Me Back to Life" received positive reviews from music critics. Gary Graff of Billboard wrote that Dion embraced contemporary pop trends with the lead single from her first English‑language album in six years, praising the "stuttering" vocal hook and dubstep elements as stylistically current and likening them to the work of artists such as Rihanna. He characterized Dion's performance as full, soaring, and more sombre than usual, calling it "commanding". Popjournalism praised the single as a strong mainstream offering that positioned Dion's 5 November album release for broad appeal without distancing long‑time listeners. MTV's Brad Stern likewise responded favorably, naming it one of the week's must‑hear pop songs and describing it as a powerful ballad written by Sia, distinguished by emotional delivery and polished production.

The Huffington Post described the track as a modern production that incorporates dubstep and a hip hop‑influenced beat, noting that its bass and drum patterns almost suggest a transition into a rap verse. Idolator editor Sam Lansky praised the song's vocal loop, production, instrumentation, and chorus, calling it fresh and contemporary and drawing comparisons to Rihanna's "Diamonds". He added that the track should appeal to new listeners as well as long‑time fans.

OK! compared the single to a blend of styles associated with Cher and J.Lo, characterizing it as a departure from "My Heart Will Go On". Feedback Musiq argued that the studio recording was as strong as Dion's live rendition and praised Sia's songwriting. DaysTune observed that Dion delivered a more electronic‑leaning pop track with a sharper vocal approach, demonstrating her continued versatility. Jon Ali described the single as a fusion of Dion's signature vocal style with darker, modern production, calling it a strong return. KEZK-FM noted the song's electronic pop direction, drawing comparisons to Rihanna, Miley, and Katy, and acknowledging its use of synths and a pronounced vocal pattern. SheKnows Entertainment also reviewed the single positively, stating that although the lyrics are affecting, it is Dion's powerful delivery that remains most striking.

== Commercial performance ==
In the United States, "Loved Me Back to Life" entered the Billboard Adult Contemporary chart at number 26, becoming Dion's 40th appearance on the ranking. With this entry, she moved to fifth place among female artists with the most AC chart listings, behind Barbra Streisand, Dionne Warwick, Linda Ronstadt and Anne Murray. The single rose to its peak of number 24 in its third week on the chart. It sold 23,000 downloads in its opening week, debuting at number 19 on the Pop Digital Songs chart and number 63 on Hot Digital Songs. By 3 November 2013, US digital sales had reached 49,000 copies. The track also entered the Hot Dance Club Songs chart in mid‑November 2013 and climbed to number three in mid‑January 2014.

In Canada, the single earned the Hot Shot Debut on the Canadian Hot 100, opening at number 26. It became Dion's strongest debut on the chart and her second‑highest peak, surpassed only by 2007's "Taking Chances". The track also debuted at number 15 on the Canadian Hot Digital Songs chart.

In the United Kingdom, "Loved Me Back to Life" reached number 14, becoming Dion's highest‑charting single there since "A New Day Has Come" peaked at number seven in 2002. Internationally, the single reached number 25 in Switzerland and Belgium, number 29 in Ireland, number 32 in France, and number 38 in Germany and Austria.

== Music video ==
On 18 September 2013, a live performance of "Loved Me Back to Life" was uploaded to Dion's official Vevo channel. The video includes footage from her sold‑out Celine... une seule fois concert in Quebec City on 27 July 2013. A lyric video followed on 15 October 2013.

== Live performances ==
In Canada, Dion premiered "Loved Me Back to Life" live during her Celine... une seule fois concert in Quebec City on 27 July 2013, surprising the audience with its first public performance. The rendition was later included on the Céline une seule fois / Live 2013 CD/DVD (2014). She also performed the song on Le Banquier on 3 November 2013.

In the United States, Dion promoted the single with a series of television appearances, performing "Loved Me Back to Life" on Jimmy Kimmel Live! on 6 September 2013, The Ellen DeGeneres Show on 11 September 2013, Late Night with Jimmy Fallon on 28 October 2013, and The View on 30 October 2013. She also gave an intimate performance at the Edison Ballroom in New York City on 29 October 2013, which was broadcast on QVC on 1 November 2013. The performance was uploaded to her official Vevo channel on 8 November 2013.

Dion subsequently brought the song to European television. She performed it on Wetten, dass..? in Germany on 9 November 2013, on The X Factor in the United Kingdom on 10 November 2013, and on C'est votre vie in France on 16 November 2013. She also included the song in her European Tour 2013, which opened in Belgium on 21 November 2013. In France, Dion performed "Loved Me Back to Life" on Les chansons d'abord on 1 December 2013, Vivement Dimanche on 8 December 2013, Les disques d'Or on 18 December 2013, and Ce soir on chante on 3 January 2014.

Dion returned to the United States in mid‑December 2013 and performed the song on 18 December during the CBS 15th annual A Home for the Holidays special, which raises awareness of adoption from foster care. On 30 December 2013, she added "Loved Me Back to Life" to the set list of her Las Vegas residency, Celine. The performance from that evening was broadcast on 31 December 2013 as part of ET Canada's New Year's Eve at Niagara Falls. She later included the song in her 2017 European tour.

== Formats and track listing ==
Digital single and German CD single

1. "Loved Me Back to Life" (album version) – 3:50
2. "Loved Me Back to Life" (Dave Audé radio extended) – 4:27

== Remixes ==
1. "Loved Me Back to Life" (Dave Audé club mix) – 7:00
2. "Loved Me Back to Life" (Dave Audé radio mix) – 4:16
3. "Loved Me Back to Life" (Dave Audé radio extended) – 4:27
4. "Loved Me Back to Life" (Dave Audé mixshow) – 5:59
5. "Loved Me Back to Life" (Dave Audé dub) – 6:56
6. "Loved Me Back to Life" (Dave Audé instrumental) – 6:59
7. "Loved Me Back to Life" (David Morales la vie in stereo remix) – 6:49
8. "Loved Me Back to Life" (David Morales la vie in stereo DJ remix) – 6:49
9. "Loved Me Back to Life" (David Morales la vie in stereo radio edit) – 4:00
10. "Loved Me Back to Life" (Jump Smokers club mix) – 4:39
11. "Loved Me Back to Life" (Jump Smokers extended mix) – 5:00
12. "Loved Me Back to Life" (Jump Smokers dub) – 4:36
13. "Loved Me Back to Life" (Jump Smokers instrumental) – 4:34

== Credits and personnel ==
Recording

- Vocals recorded at Studio at the Palms, Las Vegas, Nevada
- Mixed at Larrabee Studios, North Hollywood, California

Personnel

- Celine Dion – lead vocals
- Hasham "Sham" Hussain – songwriting, production, vocals production, recording engineer
- Denarius "Motesart" Motes – songwriting, production, instruments, programming
- Sia Furler – songwriting, background vocals (uncredited)
- François Lalonde – vocals recording
- Rob Katz – vocals recording assistant
- Manny Marroquin – mixing
- Chris Galland – mixing assistant
- Delbert Bowers – mixing assistant

== Charts ==
Chart performance
Chart (2013–2014)	Peak position
Austria (Ö3 Austria Top 40)	38
Belgium (Ultratip Bubbling Under Flanders)	28
Belgium (Ultratop 50 Wallonia)	25
Canada Hot 100 (Billboard)	26
Canada AC (Billboard)	39
CIS Airplay (TopHit)	127
France (SNEP)	32
Germany (GfK)	38
Hong Kong (Metro Radio)	4
Ireland (IRMA)	29
Lebanon (Lebanese Top 20)	2
Quebec Radio Songs (ADISQ)	1
Scotland Singles (OCC)	12
South Korea (Gaon International Download)	17
Sweden (DigiListan)	31
Switzerland (Schweizer Hitparade)	25
Ukraine Airplay (TopHit)	62
UK Singles (OCC)	14
US Adult Contemporary (Billboard)	24
US Dance Club Songs (Billboard)	3
US Digital Song Sales (Billboard)	63

== Certifications ==
Certifications
Region	Certification	Certified units/sales
Canada (Music Canada)	Gold	40,000^{‡}
^{‡} Sales+streaming figures based on certification alone.

== Release history ==
Release history
Region	Date	Format	Version	Label	Ref.
Various	3 September 2013	Digital download	Original	Columbia	
Italy	3 September 2013	Contemporary hit radio	Original	Columbia	
United States	9 September 2013	Adult Contemporary radio	Original	Columbia	
Italy	28 October 2013	Contemporary hit radio	Dave Audé remix	Columbia	
Austria; Germany; Switzerland	1 November 2013	CD	Original; Dave Audé remix	Columbia	
Australia; Europe	1 November 2013	Digital download	Original; Dave Audé remix	Columbia	
