= Immensité =

Single by Celine Dion

from the album D'elles
- Language: French
- Released: 14 May 2007
- Studio: Piccolo
- Genre: Pop
- Length: 3:34
- Label: Columbia
- Songwriters: Nina Bouraoui; Jacques Veneruso
- Producers: Jacques Veneruso; Patrick Hampartzoumian

Celine Dion singles chronology
"Et s'il n'en restait qu'une (je serais celle-là)" (2007)	"Immensité" (2007)	"Taking Chances" (2007)

Music video
- "Immensité" on YouTube

"Immensité" (lit. 'Immensity') is the second single from Celine Dion's 2007 French-language album D'elles. It premiered on radio in France and Quebec on 27 April 2007 and was issued as a digital download on 14 May 2007. The track was also sent to radio in Belgium in August 2007.

== Background and release ==
"Immensité" was written by Nina Bouraoui and French composer Jacques Veneruso, who also produced the recording. Veneruso had collaborated with Dion on several earlier songs, including "Sous le vent", "Tout l'or des hommes", and "Je ne vous oublie pas". Bouraoui contributed another composition to D'elles, titled "Les paradis". The single was released digitally on 14 May 2007. Because it was not issued on CD, "Immensité" was ineligible for the main singles charts in France, Belgium, and Switzerland, which at the time were based on physical sales.

== Music video ==
The music video was filmed at Lake Mead on 5 and 6 April 2007 and premiered on 22 May 2007.

== Live performances ==
Dion performed "Immensité" during two television specials created for the release of D'elles. She also sang it at a private benefit concert for Sainte-Justine on 4 August 2007. During her visit to France in November 2007, she promoted the song again and included it on the "Taking Chances" French CD single issued at that time. In April 2008, "Immensité" was added as a bonus track to the digital deluxe edition of Taking Chances. Dion later performed it on Star Academy, during her European concerts in 2013, her 2016 tour, and her French concerts in 2017.

== Charts ==
Chart performance
Chart (2007)	Peak position
Belgium (Ultratip Bubbling Under Wallonia)	6
Canada AC (Billboard)	30
Quebec Radio Songs (ADISQ)	7

== Release history ==
Release history
Country	Date	Format	Label	Ref.
Francophone countries	14 May 2007	Digital download	Columbia	
