= Je ne vous oublie pas =

Single by Celine Dion

from the album On ne change pas
- Language: French
- B-side: "Sous le vent" (with Garou and Les 500 Choristes)
- Released: 27 September 2005
- Studio: Digital Insight; Hauts de Gammes
- Genre: Pop
- Length: 3:35
- Label: Columbia
- Songwriter: Jacques Veneruso
- Producers: Jacques Veneruso; Patrick Hampartzoumian

Celine Dion singles chronology
"Et je t'aime encore" (2004)	"Je ne vous oublie pas" (2005)	"Tous les secrets" (2006)

Music video
- "Je ne vous oublie pas" on YouTube

"Je ne vous oublie pas" (lit. 'I won't forget you') is the lead single from Celine Dion's 2005 French-language greatest hits album On ne change pas. It was issued as a digital download in Canada on 27 September 2005 and in France on 3 October 2005. The CD single was released in France, Belgium, and Switzerland later that month. The song reached number two in France and was certified gold.

== Background and release ==
The lyrics, written by Jacques Veneruso, who had collaborated with Dion on her previous French album 1 fille & 4 types, present the track as a dedication to her fans. Veneruso later wrote and produced four songs for Dion's next French album, D'elles, as well as "Parler à mon père" from Sans attendre.

A version performed by Dion and Les 500 Choristes was released in November 2006 on their album 500 Choristes avec.../vol.2. It was later included on Dion's 2007 single "Et s'il n'en restait qu'une (je serais celle-là)".

== Commercial performance ==
"Je ne vous oublie pas" reached number two in France and was certified gold. It also charted in other markets, peaking at number two in Quebec, number four in Belgium's Wallonia region, and number 21 in Switzerland.

== Music video ==
The music video was filmed and directed by Didier Kerbrat at the Imperial Theatre in Montreal in July 2005 and released in September 2005. In 2013, Dion performed a cappella excerpts of the song as both the introduction and the outro of her European Tour 2013.

== Live performances ==
Dion visited France in October 2005 to promote On ne change pas and performed "Je ne vous oublie pas" on various television programs.

== Accolades ==
In 2006, "Je ne vous oublie pas" was nominated for Best Song of the Year at the Félix Awards.

== Formats and track listing ==
- French CD single
1. "Je ne vous oublie pas" – 3:35
2. "Sous le vent" (with Garou and Les 500 Choristes) – 3:34
3. "Je ne vous oublie pas" (instrumental) – 3:35

== Charts ==
=== Weekly charts ===
Weekly chart performance
Chart (2005)	Peak position
Belgium (Ultratip Bubbling Under Flanders)	9
Belgium (Ultratop 50 Wallonia)	4
Canada AC (Radio & Records)	23
Europe (European Hot 100 Singles)	8
France (SNEP)	2
Quebec Radio Songs (ADISQ)	2
Switzerland (Schweizer Hitparade)	21

=== Year-end charts ===
Year-end chart performance
Chart (2005)	Position
Belgium (Ultratop 50 Wallonia)	41
France (SNEP)	30

== Certifications ==
Certifications
Region	Certification	Certified units/sales
France (SNEP)	Gold	200,000^{*}
^{*} Sales figures based on certification alone.

== Release history ==
Release history
Region	Date	Format	Label	Ref.
Canada	27 September 2005	Digital download	Columbia	
France	3 October 2005	Digital download	Columbia	
Belgium; Switzerland	7 October 2005	CD	Columbia	
France	17 October 2005	CD	Columbia	
