= Nina Bouraoui =

French novelist and songwriter (born 1967)

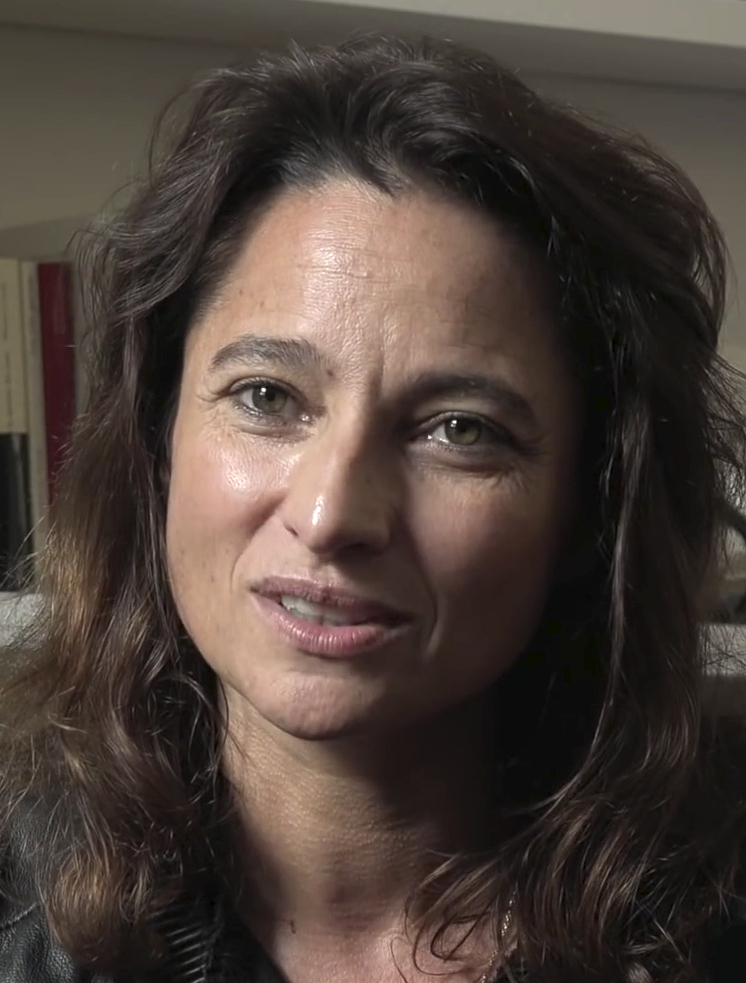
- Nina Bouraoui in 2016
- Born: Yasmina Bouraoui; 31 July 1967 (age 59); Rennes, France
- Occupation: Novelist
- Known for: Winner of the Prix Renaudot (2005)

Yasmina "Nina" Bouraoui (Arabicنينا بو راوي, born 1967) is a French novelist and songwriter born in Rennes, Ille-et-Vilaine to an Algerian father from the town of Jijel and a French mother. She spent the first fourteen years of her life in Algiers, then Zürich and Abu Dhabi. She now lives in Paris.

Her novels are mostly written in the first person and, with the exception of Avant les hommes, have been said by the author to be works of "auto-fiction". This is even the case for Le Bal des Murènes, which, like Avant les hommes, has a male narrator. Since writing her first novel in 1991, Bouraoui has affirmed the influence of Marguerite Duras in her work, although the life narratives and works of many other artists are also to be found in her novels (and songs). This is particularly true of Mes Mauvaises Pensées which bears the imprint of Hervé Guibert, Annie Ernaux, David Lynch, Eileen Gray, and Violette Leduc amongst others. Questions of identity, desire, memory, writing, childhood and celebrity culture are some of the major themes of her work.

== Works ==
- La Voyeuse interdite (1991, Prix du Livre Inter 1991), translated as Forbidden Vision (1999)
- Poing mort (1992)
- Le Bal des murènes (1996)
- L'Âge blessé (1998)
- Le Jour du séisme (1999)
- Garçon manqué (2000), translated as Tomboy (2007)
- La Vie heureuse (2002)
- Poupée Bella (2004)
- Mes mauvaises pensées (2005, Prix Renaudot)
- Avant les hommes (2007)
- Appelez-moi par mon prénom (2008)
- Nos baisers sont des adieux (2010)
- Sauvage (2011)
- Standard (2014)
- Beaux rivages (2016)
- Tous les hommes désirent naturellement savoir (2018)
- Otages (2020) Prix Anaïs Nin 2020
- Satisfaction (2022)
- Grand Seigneur (2024)

In 2007, she wrote two songs for Céline Dion titled "Immensité" and "Les paradis", set to music respectively by Jacques Veneruso and Gildas Arzel. These songs were featured on Céline Dion's album, D'elles, which came out on 21 May 2007.
