= Mary Ann Redmond =

American singer (born 1959)

Mary Ann Redmond (born 3 November 1959 in Richmond, Virginia) is an American singer known for her soulful and wide-ranging vocal style in popular and jazz music. She is based in the greater metropolitan Washington, D.C., area, but has performed in several locations in the United States and in other countries. Both her live performances and her five CDs to date have earned her acclaim from audiences and recognition from the music industry, although she has never achieved national fame on a par with many of the performers she has worked with, such as Mary Chapin Carpenter. She is primarily a regional artist and has won 24 Washington Area Music Awards (Wammies).

== Beginnings ==
Redmond was born in Richmond, Virginia, the youngest of three children. As a child she attended St. Elizabeth's Parochial School, where at the age of 6 she performed the song "Dominique," made famous by The Singing Nun. Later, she joined up with her brothers Jimbo and Jack in a band singing pop tunes. Redmond eventually attended Virginia Commonwealth University (VCU) where she studied opera and voice while playing gigs at nights with the Jack Diamond band. As her career progressed, Redmond left VCU to sing with a series of bands and casino lounge acts during the 1980s. In addition to pop music, she performed jazz and blues tunes as well, developing a broad repertoire.

== First album ==
In the mid 1990s, Redmond began singing with a band led by saxophone artist Al Williams. Tired of the road life, she settled in the Washington, DC area and with the Williams band recorded her first album, Prisoner of the Heart, first released in 1994 (a remixed version was re-released in 2002). It was around this time that the major recording company Motown signed Mary Ann Redmond to a development deal. However, before she had the opportunity to record or release any product, a change in personnel at the label resulted in her being dropped from Motown. Rather than seek another major label, Redmond founded an independent music company, Spellbound Music, to handle both her albums and her original songs. With the exception of her third album Here I Am, all of Redmond's material has been released on the Spellbound label.

== Going solo ==
In 1995, Mary Ann Redmond formed her own supporting band and went out as a solo act, performing at Washington-area clubs and private parties. One of her first major shows was at the famed jazz club Blues Alley. This performance was recorded and released as Mary Ann's second CD, Live At Blues Alley. Redmond became increasingly well known, earning awards and positive reviews in major trade publications such as Billboard. Other artists began to seek her out, and she occasional worked with other performers in duos for specific shows. One of her friends was another upcoming artist of the period, Eva Cassidy. Redmond and Cassidy had different vocal styles but they admired one another's work, and performed together one night at "Fleetwoods," and when Cassidy was stricken with cancer, Redmond sang at a Georgetown benefit to raise funds for her. Following Cassidy's death in 1996, Redmond added her vocals to a version of Cassidy's song, "Hear," creating a recorded duet that is now considered a special track by fans of both women.

After meeting fellow performer Jon Carroll, a member of Mary Chapin Carpenter's band, Carroll produced Redmond's 2000 CD, Here I Am. The album includes a song written by Mary Chapin Carpenter for Redmond, "Alone but Not Lonely." Another band member, John Jennings, later produced Redmond's 2005 release Send the Moon. Redmond also joined the others to perform during a USO show for the U.S. Armed Forces in Bosnia in 1999.

== Today ==
Mary Ann co-wrote Love Me Anyway with Todd Wright, that was covered as a duet on Celine Dion's and Johnny Hallyday's 2012 French CDs. Celine's CD, Sans Attendre, has sold over 3 million copies.

The lineup of the Mary Ann Redmond Band is subject to change over the years and as of 2013 she is working with guitarist Dan Leonard (and sometimes Michael Ault or Keith Grimes), bassist Mike Tony Echols and drummer Deren Blessman.

The Mary Ann Redmond Band performs every Sunday night (well almost every Sunday night) at Flanagan's Harp & Fiddle in Bethesda, Maryland.

Mary Ann completed a new Jazz CD, Compared To What, with Paul Langosch and Jay Cooley, released in the summer of 2013, which includes Love Me Anyway.

Since 1992, Mary Ann has won 24 Wammies (Washington Area Music Awards). In 2013 Ms. Redmond was awarded 3 Wammies for Blues/traditional RB female vocalist, song of the year for Love Me Anyway, and songwriter of the year with Todd Wright. She received her latest Wammie for 2014 in the category of Blues/traditional RB female vocalist.
