= Jamaica Jazz and Blues Festival =

The Jamaica Jazz and Blues Festival, formerly known as the Air Jamaica Jazz and Blues Festival, was created to encourage visitors to come to Jamaica during a traditionally slow tourism period for the island. The original owner of the festival, Air Jamaica, also hoped to sell more airline seats during the slow period.

== Production history ==
The festival was originally targeted at jazz and blues enthusiasts, attracted audiences of 1,500 to 2,000, and was held in November each year. Various factors including heavy rains which occur at that time of the year encouraged the organizers to move the dates of the festival to the end of January, another traditionally slow tourism period.

With limited audiences and increasing expenditure, the event eventually became a drain on Air Jamaica's coffers, and in 2004 the festival was sold to Walter Elmore, one of the original members of the festival team. Elmore, with many years of experience in the production of large events, formed TurnKey Productions, which then became the owner and producer of the Air Jamaica Jazz and Blues Festival.

The festival grew tremendously under Elmore’s watch, attracting crowds of over 30,000. In 2009 Air Jamaica relinquished the title sponsorship to the Jamaica Tourist Board and the festival became known as the Jamaica Jazz and Blues Festival.

The Festival is produced and presented by TurnKey Productions, a company which also produces several other large music festivals in the Caribbean. This show is enjoyed by many

== Festival concept ==
The festival is an annual event and traditionally has been a three-day music festival held the last weekend of January. It encompasses a range of music genres, including jazz, R&B, blues, Latin, Reggae, Soca, and various types of musical fusion. In 2010, the Festival was extended to seven days and was hosted at different venues starting in Kingston, Jamaica, continuing in various hotels in Montego Bay, and culminating with three days at its new home, the Greenfield Stadium in Trelawny.

== Performers ==
The festival has attracted numerous international artists, including Dr. John, Celine Dion, Gladys Knight, Maroon 5, Natalie Cole, Diana Ross, Kenny Rogers, Anita Baker, Hall & Oates, John Legend, Alicia Keys, Maxi Priest, Babyface, The Whispers, Joss Stone, Monty Alexander, Billy Ocean, Chaka Khan, Paul Peress, Regina Belle, Brenda Russell, Mary J. Blige, Dionne Warwick, Estelle, Lionel Richie, George Benson, Chuck Mangione, Smokey Robinson, Earth, Wind & Fire, Kool & The Gang, Boyz II Men, Micheal Bolton, Jill Scott, Brian McKnight, Atlantic Starr, India.Arie, Norah Jones, Harry Belafonte, Julio Iglesias, Patti LaBelle, Air Supply, Al Green, Queen Project, Mary Mary, Robin Thicke, Lou Rawls, Erykah Badu and Mariah Carey. Local acts include Tarrus Riley, Christopher Martin, Marcia Griffiths, Chronixx, Chalice, Bryan Art.
