= Céline sur les Plaines =

Video by Celine Dion
- Released: 11 November 2008
- Recorded: 22 August 2008
- Venue: Plains of Abraham (Quebec City)
- Genre: Pop
- Length: 205:00
- Language: French
- Labels: Productions J; TF1 Video
- Directors: Jean Lamoureux (concert); Stéphane Laporte (bonus material)
- Producer: Julie Snyder

Celine Dion chronology
Live in Las Vegas: A New Day... (2007)	Céline sur les Plaines (2008)	Celine: Through the Eyes of the World (2010)

Céline sur les Plaines (lit. 'Celine on the Plains') is the ninth home video by Canadian singer Celine Dion. Released in Canada by Productions J on 11 November 2008, it documents Dion's concert on the Plains of Abraham in Quebec City before 250,000 spectators on 22 August 2008, staged as part of the city's 400th‑anniversary celebrations. The program was issued in France, Belgium, and Switzerland on 20 May 2009 under the title Live à Québec. It topped the charts in Canada, France, and Belgium, reached number two in Switzerland, and won the Félix Award for DVD of the Year in 2009.

== Concert ==
In June 2008, Dion was announced as the headliner for a large‑scale outdoor concert marking Quebec City's 400th anniversary. She personally selected the guest artists, assembling a lineup that included Garou, Marc Dupré, Nanette Workman, Dan Bigras, Mes Aïeux, members of the Dion family, Zachary Richard, Éric Lapointe, Claude Dubois, Jean-Pierre Ferland, and Ginette Reno. Together, Dion and her guests performed more than 30 songs for an audience of 250,000, while an additional 100,000 spectators watched the event on giant screens in Lévis.

The concert became available the next day through video‑on‑demand services from Vidéotron, Shaw, and Cogeco. Nearly 130,000 subscribers accessed the special offer. On 21 September 2008, the event aired on TVA, drawing almost 1.8 million viewers and becoming the most‑watched program of the evening in Quebec.

In October 2008, it was confirmed that the full concert would be released on DVD. Céline sur les Plaines was issued in Canada on 11 November 2008. The DVD includes more than three hours of material, combining the full concert with bonus footage and behind‑the‑scenes clips filmed during rehearsals, backstage, and on the day of the event. On 20 May 2009, the program was released in France, Belgium, and Switzerland as Live à Québec. A collector's edition containing 10 autographed photographs was also issued.

== Commercial performance ==
Céline sur les Plaines opened at number one on the Canadian Music DVD chart, selling 32,800 copies in its first week. It became the highest‑selling DVD of any genre in Canada for 2008. After three weeks, cumulative sales had reached 49,059 units. As of June 2014, sales exceeded 100,000 copies, making the release eligible for diamond certification in Canada.

Live à Québec also debuted at number one on the French Music DVD chart, remaining at the top for three consecutive weeks. It sold 34,350 copies in 2009, making it the year's best‑selling music DVD by a female artist in France and the 10th best‑selling music DVD overall. In 2010, it sold an additional 5,500 units, bringing total sales to 39,850 copies. By June 2014, sales had surpassed 45,000 copies, making the release eligible for triple platinum certification in France.

In Belgium's Wallonia region, Live à Québec entered the chart at number one and spent four weeks at the top. In Switzerland, it peaked at number two, and in Belgium's Flanders region, it reached number 10.

== Accolades ==
In October 2009, Céline sur les Plaines received the Félix Award for DVD of the Year.

== Track listing ==
No.	Title	Writer(s)	Performer(s)	Length
1.	"Dans un autre monde"	Jean-Jacques Goldman	Celine Dion
2.	"Destin"	Goldman	Dion
3.	"On ne change pas"	Goldman	Dion
4.	"Sous le vent"	Jacques Veneruso	Dion; Garou
5.	"Seul"	Luc Plamondon; Romano Musumarra	Garou
6.	"Si pour te plaire"	Marie-Mai Bouchard; Marc Dupré	Dupré
7.	"Tout près du bonheur"	Dupré; Nelson Minville; Dion	Dupré; Dion
8.	"Show"	Veneruso	Nanette Workman
9.	"Lady Marmelade"	Bob Crewe; Kenny Nolan; Workman; Angelo Finaldi	Dion; Workman
10.	"J'irai où tu iras"	Goldman	Dion; Workman
11.	"Tue-moi"	Francis Basset; Franck Langolff	Dion; Dan Bigras
12.	"Ô Fortuna"	Carl Orff	Bigras
13.	"Les trois petits cochons"	François Parenteau; Bigras	Bigras; Mes Aïeux
14.	"Ton père est un croche"	Stéphane Archambault; Frédéric Giroux; Mes Aïeux	Mes Aïeux
15.	"Le déni de l'évidence"	Archambault; Giroux	Mes Aïeux
16.	"Dégénérations/Le reel du fossé"	Archambault; Mes Aïeux; Marie-Hélène Fortin	Dion; Mes Aïeux
17.	"Jos Montferrand/La bastringue/Jack Monoloy/Le reel facile/Dans nos vieilles maisons/Le bal chez Jos Brûlé/À la claire fontaine" (medley de la famille Dion)	Gilles Vigneault; La Bolduc; Stéphane Venne; Muriel Millard; Tex Lecor; Guillaume Côté; Nicolas Geoffroy; Patrick Giroux; Stéphanie Richard	Dion; La famille Dion
18.	"La ballade de Jean Batailleur"	Zachary Richard	Richard
19.	"La promesse cassée"	Francis Cabrel; Richard	Dion; Richard
20.	"L'arbre est dans ses feuilles"	Richard	Dion; Richard
21.	"L'amour existe encore"	Plamondon; Riccardo Cocciante	Dion; Éric Lapointe
22.	"Toucher"	Plamondon; Dan Georgesco; Lapointe; Bruce Cameron	Lapointe
23.	"Mon ange"	Lapointe; Roger Tabra; Claude Pineault	Lapointe
24.	"La chasse-galerie"	Claude Dubois	Dubois; Garou; Lapointe
25.	"Si Dieu existe"	Dubois	Dion; Dubois
26.	"Femmes de rêve"	Dubois	Dubois
27.	"Et s'il n'en restait qu'une (je serais celle-là)"	Françoise Dorin; David Gategno	Dion
28.	"S'il suffisait d'aimer"	Goldman	Dion
29.	"Pour que tu m'aimes encore"	Goldman	Dion
30.	"Une chance qu'on s'a"	Jean-Pierre Ferland; Alain Leblanc	Dion; Ferland
31.	"Un peu plus haut, un peu plus loin"	Ferland	Dion; Ferland; Ginette Reno

Bonus material
No.	Title	Length
1.	"Avant le spectacle" (Before the show)
2.	"Céline en coulisses 1" (Céline behind the scenes 1)
3.	"Céline en coulisses 2" (Céline behind the scenes 2)
4.	"Après le spectacle" (After the show)

== Charts ==
=== Weekly charts ===
Weekly chart performance
Chart (2008–2009)	Peak position
Belgian Music DVD (Ultratop Flanders)	10
Belgian Music DVD (Ultratop Wallonia)	1
Canadian Music DVD (Nielsen SoundScan)	1
French Music DVD (SNEP)	1
Swiss Music DVD (Schweizer Hitparade)	2

=== Year-end charts ===
2009 year-end chart performance
Chart (2009)	Position
Belgian Music DVD (Ultratop Flanders)	43
Belgian Music DVD (Ultratop Wallonia)	5
French Music DVD (SNEP)	10

2010 year-end chart performance
Chart (2010)	Position
Belgian Music DVD (Ultratop Wallonia)	29
French Music DVD (SNEP)	69

== Release history ==
Release history
Region	Date	Label	Format	Catalog
Canada	11 November 2008	Productions J	DVD	064027233193
Belgium; France; Switzerland	20 May 2009	TF1 Video	DVD	3384442217859
Belgium; France; Switzerland	20 May 2009	TF1 Video	DVD with photographs	3384442217866
