= Et s'il n'en restait qu'une (je serais celle-là) =

Single by Celine Dion

from the album D'elles
- Language: French
- B-side: "Je ne vous oublie pas" (500 Choristes version)
- Released: 14 February 2007
- Studio: Piccolo
- Genre: Pop
- Length: 3:33
- Label: Columbia
- Songwriters: Françoise Dorin; David Gategno
- Producer: David Gategno

Celine Dion singles chronology
"I Believe in You (Je crois en toi)" (2006)	"Et s'il n'en restait qu'une (je serais celle-là)" (2007)	"Immensité" (2007)

Music video
- "Et s'il n'en restait qu'une (je serais celle-là)" on YouTube

"Et s'il n'en restait qu'une (je serais celle-là)" (lit. 'And if there were only one woman left (I would be that one)') is the first single from Celine Dion's French-language album D'elles. It premiered on radio in Francophone countries on 14 February 2007 and was released as a digital download the same day. The CD single followed on 13 April 2007 in France, Belgium, and Switzerland. The song reached number one in France.

== Background and release ==
"Et s'il n'en restait qu'une (je serais celle-là)" was written by Françoise Dorin and composed by David Gategno, who also produced the recording. Dorin was a French writer known for best-selling novels such as Virginie et Paul, la seconde dans Rome (1980), Les lits à une place, les jupes culotte (1984), and Les corbeaux et les renardes (1988). Her body of work also includes the plays La facture (1968) and Un sale egoiste, l'intoxe (1980), the musical comedy La valise en carton, and numerous humorous texts. Gategno had previously collaborated with Tina Arena, Natasha St-Pier, Chimène Badi, Faudel, and Nolwenn Leroy.

The title is taken from the final verse of the poem "Ultima verba" in Les Châtiments by Victor Hugo: "Et s'il n'en reste qu'un, je serai celui-là!".

Although the track was issued as a digital download on 14 February 2007, it did not qualify for the main singles charts in France, Belgium, and Switzerland until the release of the CD single on 12 April 2007, because the charts in those countries at the time were based solely on physical sales.

== Commercial performance ==
"Et s'il n'en restait qu'une (je serais celle-là)" debuted at number one on the French Singles Chart, becoming Dion's fifth chart-topper in France. It remained on the chart for 33 weeks, making it one of her longest-running singles in that market.

Elsewhere, the song peaked at number two in Quebec, number four in Belgium's Wallonia region, and number 34 in Switzerland.

== Music video ==
The music video was directed by Thierry Vargnes in New York City on 31 January 2007 and premiered on the Canadian television network TVA on 1 April 2007.

== Live performances ==
Dion performed the song during the French concerts of her 2008–2009 Taking Chances World Tour. She also sang it before 250,000 spectators at the celebration of Quebec's 400th anniversary, a performance later included on the Céline sur les Plaines DVD in 2008. A live version was also issued on the CD/DVD Tournée Mondiale Taking Chances: Le Spectacle.

== Accolades ==
"Et s'il n'en restait qu'une (je serais celle-là)" was nominated for the Chérie FM Star award in the category French Song of the Year.

== Formats and track listing ==
- French CD single
1. "Et s'il n'en restait qu'une (je serais celle-là)" – 3:32
2. "Je ne vous oublie pas" (500 Choristes version) – 3:35
3. "Et s'il n'en restait qu'une (je serais celle-là)" (instrumental) – 3:32

== Charts ==
=== Weekly charts ===
Weekly chart performance
Chart (2007)	Peak position
Belgium (Ultratop 50 Wallonia)	4
Canada AC (Billboard)	28
Europe (European Hot 100 Singles)	7
France (SNEP)	1
Quebec Radio Songs (ADISQ)	2
Switzerland (Schweizer Hitparade)	34

=== Year-end charts ===
Year-end chart performance
Chart (2007)	Position
Belgium (Ultratop 50 Wallonia)	31
Belgium (Ultratop 50 Wallonia - CD singles)	23
France (SNEP)	50

== Release history ==
Release history
Region	Date	Format	Label	Ref.
Francophone countries	14 February 2007	Digital download	Columbia	
Belgium; Switzerland	13 April 2007	CD	Columbia	
France	16 April 2007	CD	Columbia	

== See also ==
- List of number-one singles of 2007 (France)
