= Tout l'or des hommes =

2003 single by Celine Dion

Single by Celine Dion

from the album 1 fille & 4 types
- Language: French
- B-side: "Tu nages"
- Released: 6 October 2003
- Recorded: 2–11 May 2003
- Studio: Digital Insight (Las Vegas)
- Genre: Pop
- Length: 2:58
- Label: Columbia
- Songwriter: Jacques Veneruso
- Producer: Erick Benzi

Celine Dion singles chronology
"One Heart" (2003)	"Tout l'or des hommes" (2003)	"Have You Ever Been in Love" (2003)

Music video
- "Tout l'or des hommes" on YouTube

"Tout l'or des hommes" (lit. 'All the men's gold') is a song by Canadian singer Celine Dion from her 20th studio album, 1 fille & 4 types (2003). Written by Jacques Veneruso and produced by Erick Benzi, it was issued as the album's lead single on 6 October 2003. The song topped the charts in Quebec and Poland. In Canada, it reached number two, becoming the joint-highest-charting French-language song on the Canadian Singles Chart. Elsewhere, it peaked at number three in France, number five in Belgium's Wallonia and number 10 in Switzerland. It was also certified gold in France.

== Background and release ==
Dion began working on her next French-language album on 8 October 2002 in Paris, where she met with four French songwriters and producers: Jean-Jacques Goldman, Erick Benzi, Jacques Veneruso and Gildas Arzel. After four days of rehearsals, she met with them again in Las Vegas in May 2003 during a break from performing in A New Day.... The songs were recorded between 2 and 11 May 2003.

Goldman, who wrote and produced Dion's best-selling French-language album D'eux, served as the artistic director for 1 fille & 4 types. The first single, "Tout l'or des hommes", was sent to radio on 27 August 2003. Veneruso, who wrote the track, had previously written Dion and Garou's 2001 number-one hit "Sous le vent".

The music video for "Tout l'or des hommes" was serviced to video outlets in September 2003, and the CD single was released on 6 October 2003 in France, Switzerland and Belgium, on 7 October 2003 in Canada, and a few weeks later in Germany. In 2005, the song was included on Dion's greatest hits album On ne change pas.

== Critical reception ==
Rob Theakston of AllMusic described the song positively in his review of the album. David Browne of Entertainment Weekly wrote that Dion and her "guys" deliver "reverby twang" on "Tout l'or des hommes".

== Commercial performance ==
In Quebec, "Tout l'or des hommes" topped the chart for eight weeks. It also spent three weeks at number one in Poland. The song reached the top 10 in several Francophone markets, including number three in France, where it was certified gold for sales of 250,000 copies. It became the highest-charting French-language song on the Canadian Singles Chart (along with Audrey De Montigny's "Même les anges"), peaking at number two in October 2003.

Elsewhere, it reached number five in Belgium's Wallonia, number 10 in Switzerland, and number 10 on the European Hot 100 Singles. It also peaked at number 16 in Finland, number 29 in Belgium's Flanders, number 77 in Germany, number 82 in Romania, and number 100 in the Netherlands.

On the Belgian airplay charts, "Tout l'or des hommes" reached number two in Wallonia and number 13 in Flanders.

== Music video ==
The music video, directed by Yannick Saillet, was shot in May 2003 in the Mojave Desert and released in September 2003. It was included on the "Tout l'or des hommes" DVD single in 2003 and later on Dion's greatest hits DVD collection, On ne change pas (2005). The making-of for the video was included on the 1 fille & 4 types limited edition and on the On ne change pas DVD as well.

== Formats and track listing ==
- Canadian CD single
1. "Tout l'or des hommes" – 2:58
2. "Tu nages" – 3:09
- French CD single
1. "Tout l'or des hommes" – 2:58
2. "Tu nages" – 3:09
3. "Tout l'or des hommes" (instrumental) – 2:58

- French DVD single
1. "Tout l'or des hommes" (music video) – 4:07
2. "Tout l'or des hommes" (karaoke) – 4:07
- German 3-inch CD single
1. "Tout l'or des hommes" – 2:59
2. "Sous le vent" (with Garou) – 3:30

== Charts ==
=== Weekly charts ===
Weekly chart performance
Chart (2003–2004)	Peak position
Belgium (Ultratop 50 Flanders)	29
Belgium (Ultratop 50 Wallonia)	5
Canada (Nielsen SoundScan)	2
CIS Airplay (TopHit)	136
European Hot 100 Singles (Billboard)	10
Finland (Suomen virallinen lista)	16
France (SNEP)	3
Germany (GfK)	77
Netherlands (Single Top 100)	100
Poland (National Airplay)	1
Quebec Radio Songs (ADISQ)	1
Quebec Radio Songs (BDS)	1
Romania (Romanian Top 100)	82
Russia Airplay (TopHit)	132
Switzerland (Schweizer Hitparade)	10
Ukraine Airplay (TopHit)	92

=== Year-end charts ===
Year-end chart performance
Chart (2003)	Position
Belgium (Ultratop 50 Wallonia)	52
Belgium Francophone (Ultratop 50 Wallonia)	25
France (SNEP)	73
Switzerland (Schweizer Hitparade)	61

== Certifications ==
Certifications
Region	Certification	Certified units/sales
France (SNEP)	Gold	250,000^{*}
^{*} Sales figures based on certification alone.

== Release history ==
Release history
Region	Date	Format	Label	Ref.
France	6 October 2003	CD; DVD	Columbia	
Belgium; Switzerland	6 October 2003	CD	Columbia	
Canada	7 October 2003	CD	Columbia	
