= Jacques Veneruso =

French musician (born 1959)

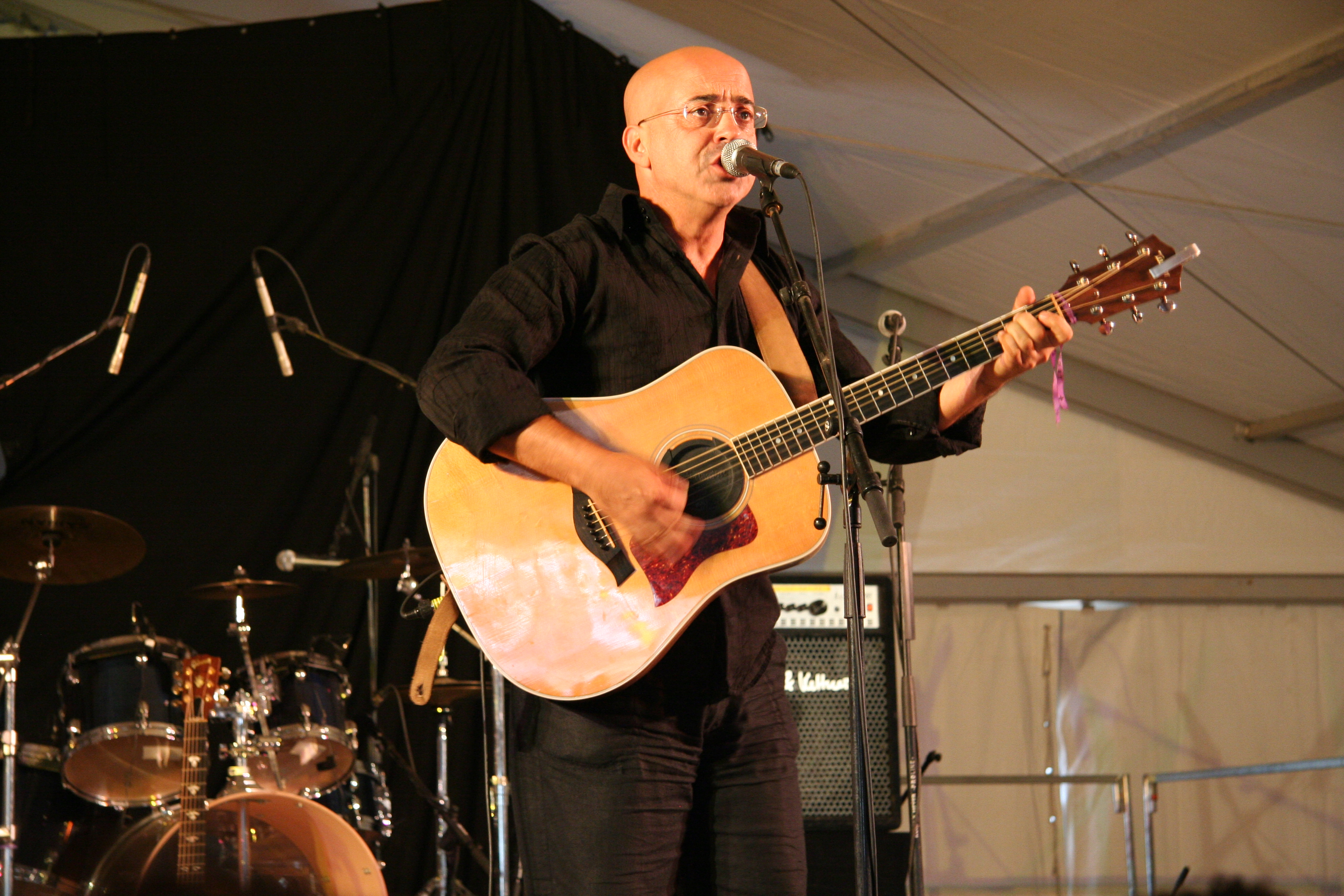
- Veneruso performing in 2019

Background information
- Born: 1959 (age 65–66); Annaba, Algeria
- Origin: France
- Occupation(s): Musician, songwriter
- Instrument(s): Guitar, vocals
- Years active: 1976–present
- Labels: Columbia, Sony
- Formerly of: Alenda/Canada

Jacques Veneruso (born 1959) is an Algerian-born French musician and songwriter. Between 1976 and 1988, he played in the band Canada, and since then has worked as a songwriter for various French-language artists.

== Career ==
=== Alenda/Canada: 1976–88 ===
In 1976, Veneruso, together with Gildas Arzel (guitar), Gwenn Arzel (drums), Erick Benzi (percussion, keyboard, saxophone), and Robert Prud'homme formed the group Alenda in Marseille, France. They later moved to Paris, changing their name to Canada and signing a contract with EMI. Canada released their first single, "Les yeux dans les yeux", in 1984. "Touché au cœur" followed a year later. In 1986, they presented a new single to their label, titled "Mourir les sirènes", but EMI refused to release it for nearly a year. In January 1987, the song entered the French Top 50 singles chart, where it remained for fourteen weeks, reaching number 27. It ranks as the 105th best-selling single of that year, with more than 300,000 copies sold. In 1988, Canada published their only studio album, titled Sur les traces. Later that year, they were spotted by musician Jean-Jacques Goldman, who invited them to join him on his 1988 tour. In 1989, Canada released their last single, "Ne m'oublie pas", which was later recorded by Johnny Hallyday and issued on his 1995 album, Lorada. Veneruso contributed songwriting, vocals, and both electric and acoustic guitar to Lorada.

=== Songwriting ===
Veneruso has written songs for a variety of French-speaking artists, such as Patrick Fiori, Florent Pagny, Michel Sardou, Yannick Noah, Garou, and Celine Dion. He has worked as music director for Pagny, Fiori, Sardou, and Carole Fredericks.

In 2004, Veneruso wrote two tribute songs to his friend Carole Fredericks, three years after her death: "Ce qui nous manque de toi", interpreted by Lââm together with Jean-Jacques Goldman, Michael Jones, and Veneruso himself, and "Un dernier blues pour toi", sung by Jones and included on his 2004 album, Prises et reprises.

=== Other work ===
In 2010, Veneruso served on the French jury at the Eurovision Song Contest, alongside Varda Kakon, Florence Coste, Jean-Pierre Pasqualini, and Olivier Ottin.

== Selected discography ==
- Canada – Sur les traces (1988)
- Johnny Hallyday – Lorada (1995)
- Celine Dion – 1 fille & 4 types (2003)

== Awards and recognition ==
- Nominated for Félix Award for Song of the Year, "Je resterai là" (1999)
- Victoires de la Musique for the song "Sous le vent" (2002)
- Nominated for Félix Award for Song of the Year, "Sous le vent" (2002)
- Prix Vincent-Scotto (SACEM) for the song "Je n'attendais que vous" (2002)
- Nominated for Félix Award for Song of the Year, "Ton histoire" (2008)
- Prix de l'Unac for the song "Parler à mon père" (2013)
