= Jean-François Breau =

Canadian singer (born 1978)

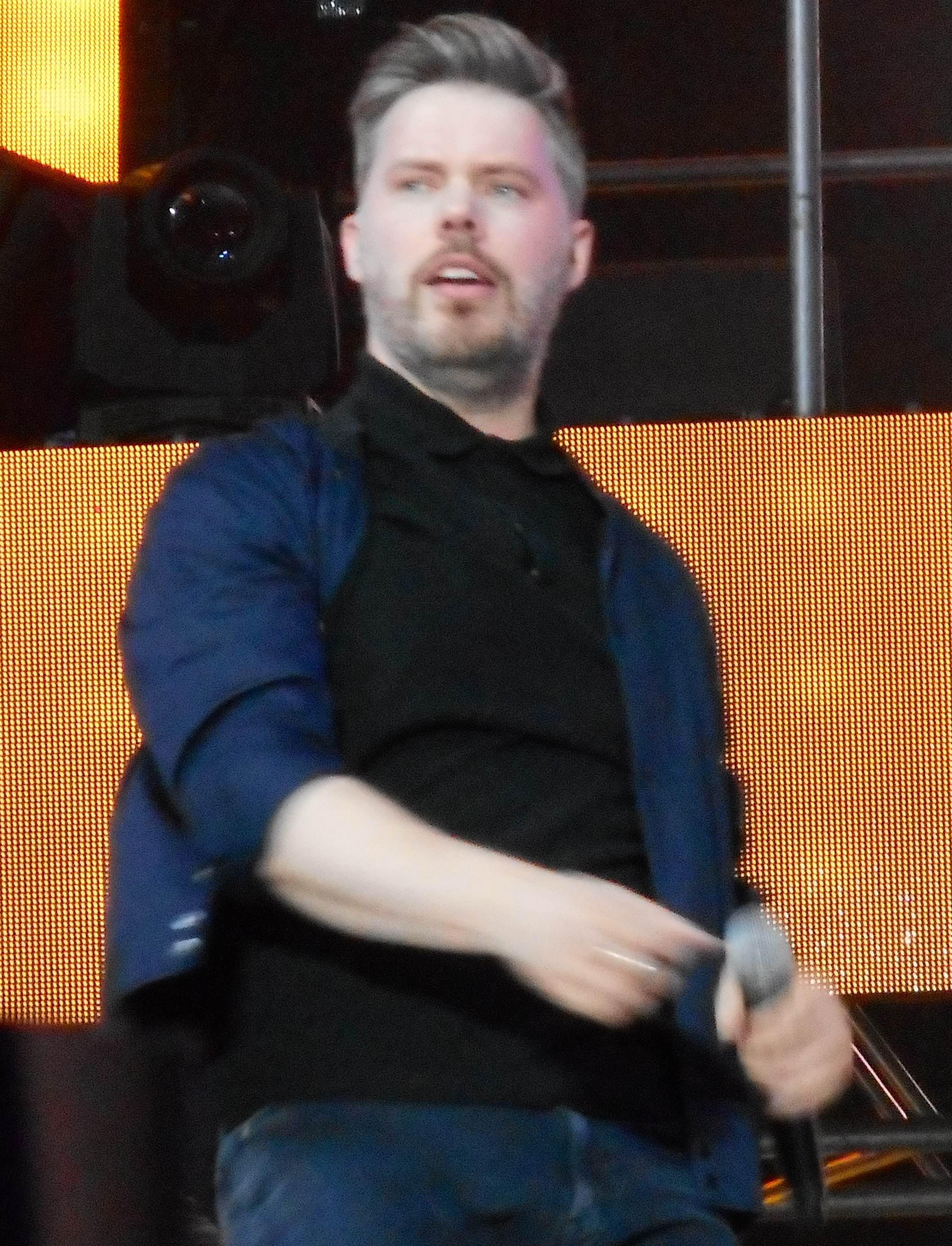
- Breau performing in 2016

Background information
- Born: July 29, 1978 (age 48)
- Origin: Hamilton, Ontario, Canada
- Occupations: Singer, Songwriter
- Years active: 2001–present
- Website: jfbreau.com marieeveetjeanfrancois.com

Jean-François Breau (born 29 July 1978 in Hamilton, Ontario, Canada) is a Canadian singer-songwriter of Acadian origin.

== Biography ==
Born in St. Catharines, Ontario of an Acadian father from Tracadie–Sheila and a mother from Matane, Breau grew up in Tracadie–Sheila, on the Acadian Peninsula, in the Gloucester county of New Brunswick. He presently resides in Quebec.

After finishing his secondary education, Breau studied medicine. He was a health major at University of Moncton's Shippagan Campus, studying to become a cardiologist.

In 2004, he took over the lead role in another musical comedy Don Juan of Félix Gray. His role was opposite the lead role of Marie-Ève Janvier. The show had 350 presentations in Canada, France and South Korea, and the album from the show featuring songs by Breau sold 350,000 worldwide.

Breau launched his first solo album in 2001 the self-titled Jean-François Breau on Quartett Music, followed by a second solo album Exposé in 2006 with ICI Musique.

In 2008, he toured Quebec with Marie-Ève Janvier, his girlfriend. In the summer of 2009, they recorded their first joint album entitled Donner pour donner, followed by a second joint album La vie à deux released on 19 September 2011. The joint single "J'ai un problème", a cover of a 1973 Johnny Hallyday and Sylvie Vartan song, became a big hit for them.

They both took part in a revival of Don Juan in February 2012 where Breau played the role of Don Juan opposite Janvier in the role of Maria. This was followed by joint promotional tour called La vie à deux tour in Quebec in Spring 2012.

== In popular culture ==
- Jean-François Breau, in collaboration with Marc Dupré wrote the song "Ici et maintenant" for Marie-Ève Janvier.
- He also wrote the music for the song "On s'est aimé à cause" with lyrics by Françoise Dorin for Céline Dion, which she included in her album D'elles.
- On 4 June 2008, he was a guest on La Petite Séduction on Télévision de Radio-Canada with the episode filmed in Saint-Casimir, Quebec.
- In 2010, Breau was part of the Ensemble pour Haïti French Canadian charity for aid for Haiti earthquake victims and performed in the charity concert and telethon organized.
- He has composed the music for the song "Te revoir" with lyrics by Frederick Baron and Marie-Jo Zarb for the Greek singer George Perris which was included in his album Un Souhait.

== Discography ==
=== Albums ===
Solo

- 2001: Jean-François Breau (Quartett Music)
- 2006: Exposé (ICI Musique)

Marie-Ève Janvier and Jean-François Breau

- 2009: Donner pour donner
- 2011: La vie à deux
- 2013: Noël à deux
- 2014: Libre

Featured in

- 2003: Don Juan (Guy Cloutier Communications)
- 2004: Don Juan (L'intégrale) (Guy Cloutier Communications)

=== Singles ===
As duo Marie-Ève Janvier and Jean-François Breau

- 2011: "Tout pour être heureux"
- 2011: "J'ai un problème"
- 2012: "L'amour c'est comme l'été"

== Appearances ==
- 1997: Festival de la chanson in Petite-Vallée
- 1998: Gala de la chanson in Caraquet
- 1998: Gala de la chanson in Saint-Ambroise
- 1998: Gala de la chanson in Granby

== Awards ==
- "Personality of the Year in New Brunswick" - awarded by the New Brunswick francophones media outlets
- 2002: "Album of the Year" at Gala des Éloizes in Moncton, New Brunswick
- 2002: "Spectacle show of the year" at the same Gala
- 2002: Nomination for "Revelation of the Year" at Gala of ADISQ
- 2002: Nomination for "Francophone Album of the Year" at the East Coast Music Award
- 2005: "Prix Éloizes" in Moncton

Joint Marie-Ève Janvier / Jean-François Breau

- 2014: Five joint nominations for at Gala of ADISQ for "Best Group of Year", "Album of the Year - Best Sold", "Album of the Year - Reinterpretations", "Spectacle show of the year" all for Noël à deux and "TV Show of the Year - Music" for the programme C'est ma toune.
