= D'elles =

Studio album by Celine Dion
- Released: 18 May 2007
- Studios: Bateau-Lune; Battamobile; Blueroom; Chalet; Hauts de Gamme; Karisma Audio; O; Rudolfinum; Vox
- Genre: Pop
- Length: 47:52
- Language: French
- Label: Columbia
- Producers: Erick Benzi; Thierry Blanchard; David Gategno; Patrick Hampartzoumian; Tino Izzo; Jacques Veneruso

Celine Dion chronology
On ne change pas (2005)	D'elles (2007)	Taking Chances (2007)

Singles from D'elles
- 1. "Et s'il n'en restait qu'une (je serais celle-là)" Released: 14 February 2007; 2. "Immensité" Released: 14 May 2007

D'elles (lit. 'About them' or 'From them') is the twenty-second studio album and thirteenth French-language album by Canadian singer Celine Dion. It was released by Columbia Records on 18 May 2007. D'elles is a concept album containing 13 songs written by prominent female authors from France and Quebec, including Françoise Dorin, Christine Orban, Nina Bouraoui, Marie Laberge, Lise Payette, Denise Bombardier, Nathalie Nechtschein, Jovette Bernier, Janette Bertrand, and George Sand. Its themes focus on womanhood, and the title plays on Dion's earlier album D'eux (1995), replacing the masculine or neutral pronoun eux with the feminine elles.

D'elles received positive reviews from music critics, some of whom described it as Dion's most ambitious project in years. It was nominated for Album of the Year and Francophone Album of the Year at the Juno Awards of 2008. Commercially, D'elles debuted at number one in Canada and France, topped the chart in Belgium's Wallonia, and reached number three in Switzerland. It was certified double platinum in Canada, platinum in France, and gold in Belgium and Switzerland. The first single, "Et s'il n'en restait qu'une (je serais celle-là)", reached number one in France and number two in Quebec. The second single, "Immensité", became another top ten entry in Quebec.

== Background ==
On 14 September 2006, Dion's official website announced that she would release a new French album in 2007. Prominent female writers from Quebec and France wrote the lyrics, and a team of well-known French composers worked on the music. Jean-Jacques Goldman was set to oversee the album, which would be recorded in Las Vegas. On 3 January 2007, it was announced that the new French-language album, D'elles, was scheduled for release in May 2007. The title is a spin-off of Dion's 1995 album D'eux. Both can be translated as "about them" or "from them", with D'elles being the specifically feminine form.

A press release from 12 January 2007 confirmed that Dion was still working on her upcoming album, which was conceived as a concept project. The lyrics were written exclusively by women: Françoise Dorin, Christine Orban, Nina Bouraoui, Marie Laberge, Lise Payette, Denise Bombardier, Nathalie Nechtschein, Janette Bertrand, Jovette Bernier, and George Sand. The album's themes centre on womanhood. Many of Dion's long-time collaborators, including Jean-Jacques Goldman, participated in the project. Although Goldman did not write any of the songs, he supervised the album and arranged the lyrics. The music was composed by Erick Benzi, Jacques Veneruso, David Gategno, and Gildas Arzel.

The first single, "Et s'il n'en restait qu'une (je serais celle-là)", written by Françoise Dorin and David Gategno, was scheduled for release in Francophone countries on 14 February 2007. Dion's official website also announced that D'elles would be released in two special editions: a double digipak and a collectors box set. The album was scheduled for release on 21 May 2007 in selected European countries, and on 22 May 2007 in Canada. "Et s'il n'en restait qu'une (je serais celle-là)" premiered on 14 February 2007 and was sent to radio and released as a digital download the same day.

A press release from 16 February 2007 stated that Dion was putting the finishing touches on D'elles, an album celebrating womanhood. Two additional composers, Marc Dupré and Jean-François Breau, were added to the project. The first excerpt from the "Et s'il n'en restait qu'une (je serais celle-là)" music video was posted on 28 March 2007, and the full video premiered on 4 April 2007. The CD single for "Et s'il n'en restait qu'une (je serais celle-là)" was issued on 13 April 2007 in Francophone countries. The album's cover art, created by Daniela Federici, was released on 19 April 2007.

== Content ==
On 17 April 2007, the complete track listing for the album, which contains 13 songs, became available to TeamCeline members. D'elles includes two versions of the song "A cause". Although the lyrics by Françoise Dorin are identical, the musical arrangements differ. The first version, titled "A cause", was composed by Jacques Veneruso, and the second, titled "On s'est aimé à cause", was composed by Marc Dupré and Jean-François Breau. Dorin also wrote the album's first single, "Et s'il n'en restait qu'une (je serais celle-là)". D'elles includes "Immensité", the second single, which was sent to radio on 27 April 2007. It was written by Nina Bouraoui, a French-Algerian author whose work often explores relationships between women. She also wrote "Les paradis".

Other songs include "Je cherche l'ombre", with lyrics by Lise Payette, a Quebec author, columnist for Le Journal de Montréal, television and radio personality, politician, and advocate for women; "La diva", a tribute to opera singer Maria Callas, written by Denise Bombardier, a journalist and novelist who received the Legion of Honour and the National Order of Quebec (the song includes a fragment of "Sì. Mi Chiamano Mimì" from La bohème, performed by Callas); "Femme comme chacune", whose lyrics adapt the poem "Ses yeux de clair de lune" by Quebec author Jovette Bernier; "Si j'étais quelqu'un", a reflection on societal norms, with lyrics adapted from a poem by French poet Nathalie Nechtschein; "Je ne suis pas celle", written by Christine Orban, a Moroccan-French novelist; "Le temps qui compte", with lyrics by Marie Laberge, a Quebec author known for her literature and plays; "Lettre de George Sand à Alfred de Musset", adapted from a 19th-century letter by George Sand; and "Berceuse", a lullaby written for Dion's son René-Charles by Janette Bertrand, a Quebec writer and media personality who received the 1990 Montreal Salon de la Femme 'Femme du Siècle' award.

D'elles was released in three editions: a standard version in a jewel case; a special edition in a double digipak that includes a DVD, a booklet of Dion's photos, and a booklet with song lyrics and Dion's notes; and a collectors box set with a DVD, a mini-booklet of photos and notes, a mini-booklet with lyrics, and four postcards. The bonus DVD, titled Céline parle d'elle(s), includes the making of the album in the recording studio, behind-the-scenes footage from the "Et s'il n'en restait qu'une (je serais celle-là)" music video, and the album photo shoot.

== Singles ==
The first single, "Et s'il n'en restait qu'une (je serais celle-là)", was released as a digital download in Francophone countries on 14 February 2007. Because singles charts in these countries did not include digital sales at the time, it entered the charts only after the CD single release on 13 April 2007. The song debuted at number one in France, becoming Dion's fifth chart-topping single there. It also peaked at number four in Belgium's Walloni and number 34 in Switzerland. These results contributed to its number-seven peak on the European Hot 100 Singles. In Quebec, the single reached number two, and it peaked at number 28 on the Canadian Adult Contemporary chart.

The second single, "Immensité", was released as a digital download in Francophone countries on 14 May 2007, and its music video premiered on 22 May 2007. As digital sales did not count towards singles charts at the time, it did not enter them. However, it peaked at number seven on the radio chart in Quebec and number 30 on the Canadian Adult Contemporary chart. In November 2007, "Immensité" was included as a B-side on the French CD single of "Taking Chances" and as a bonus track on the French digital edition of the Taking Chances album.

In Poland, "Le temps qui compte" was released as a promotional single on 18 May 2007. It reached number one on the Polish radio station RMF FM on 11 June 2007. "On s'est aimé à cause" began receiving airplay in Quebec in August 2007 and eventually peaked at number five on the radio chart. It also reached number 23 on the Canadian Adult Contemporary chart. In France, "A cause" with a dance remix was released as a promotional single in January 2008. Two weeks later, it was replaced by "Alone" from Dion's English-language album Taking Chances.

== Promotion ==
For the release of her new French-language album, Dion taped a two-hour television special about D'elles, which was broadcast on 21 May 2007 on TVA in Canada. It was hosted by Quebec television presenter Julie Snyder and included Dion and the female authors who wrote the album's lyrics. Dion performed "Et s'il n'en restait qu'une (je serais celle-là)", "Immensité", "Je cherche l'ombre", "Berceuse", "La diva", "Le temps qui compte", and "On s'est aimé à cause". The recording sessions for "Femme comme chacune", "Lettre de George Sand à Alfred de Musset", and "Si j'étais quelqu'un" were also shown. The special was watched by 1,614,000 viewers and became the top-rated show for the week of 21 to 27 May, with an 82% audience share.

On 9 June 2007, another television special was broadcast in France on TF1. Dion was interviewed and performed three songs from D'elles ("Et s'il n'en restait qu'une (je serais celle-là)", "A cause", and "Immensité"), as well as several duets: "Stayin' Alive" with Vitaa, Shy'm, and Amel Bent; "Hymne à l'amour" with Maurane and Johnny Hallyday; "Blueberry Hill" with Johnny Hallyday; "The Show Must Go On" with Christophe Maé and David Hallyday; "My Heart Will Go On" with Lââm and Amel Bent; "Caroline" with MC Solaar and Nolwenn Leroy; "Être à la hauteur" with Merwan Rim and Christophe Maé; and "Caruso" with Florent Pagny. The special was watched by 4,987,440 viewers.

Later that year, during Dion's promotional visit to France, she performed "Immensité" on several occasions: on 2 November 2007 on Star Academy as a duet with one of the contestants; on 5 November 2007 during the Chérie FM Awards ceremony, which was not broadcast; on 10 November 2007 on Hit Machine on M6; and on 29 December 2007 on Les Stars de L'année on France 2. In 2008 and 2009, Dion performed "Et s'il n'en restait qu'une (je serais celle-là)" in French-speaking territories during the Taking Chances World Tour. She also performed "Immensité" in Francophone countries during her tours in 2013, 2016, and 2017.

== Critical reception ==
Professional ratings
Review scores
Source	Rating
AllMusic	4/5 stars
Los Angeles Times	2/4 stars

D'elles received generally positive reviews from music critics. Stephen Thomas Erlewine of AllMusic described it as Dion's most ambitious project in years, noting that its only real counterpart in her catalogue is the musically adventurous 1 fille & 4 types. Although he considered D'elles somewhat cautious in its musical approach, he praised its cohesion and artistic intent. He noted the contrast between the album's "soaring majestic ballads" and its "chilly disco sheen", and called the record "extremely European".

Mikael Wood of the Los Angeles Times wrote that, although critics often accuse Dion of relying on bombast, this quality is central to her artistic identity. He compared the album's emphasis on vocal power to recent work by Madonna and Barbra Streisand, stating that Dion allows the dramatic arrangements to challenge her presence before reasserting control with her signature vocal delivery.

== Commercial reception ==
In Canada, D'elles debuted at number one, selling 72,200 copies in its first week and becoming the year's biggest debut according to data compiled by Nielsen SoundScan. It became her 10th number-one album in the SoundScan era and her eighth to debut at the top. Of the 72,200 units sold, 69,285 were purchased in Quebec alone. The album remained at number one the following week with sales of 24,158 copies. In its third week, D'elles fell to number three with sales of 11,000 units, and on 12 June 2007 it was certified double platinum in Canada for shipments of 200,000 copies. In the fourth week, the album dropped to number eight. D'elles also spent two weeks at number one on the Quebec albums chart.

In France, D'elles also debuted at number one with sales of 55,244 copies. It remained at number one the following week with sales of 44,143 units. In its third week, it dropped to number two with 18,040 copies sold. The next week, it fell to number four with sales of 17,800 units, and on 21 June 2007 it was certified platinum for shipments of 200,000 copies. By the end of 2007, the album had sold 259,700 physical copies in France. As of September 2010, sales in France exceeded 300,000 copies.

In Belgium, D'elles sold 15,000 copies on its first day and was immediately certified gold. It reached number one in Wallonia and stayed there for three consecutive weeks. In Switzerland, the album peaked at number three and was certified gold. D'elles shipped 500,000 units worldwide during its first week of release.

== Accolades ==
In July 2007, Dion was nominated for three Chérie FM Awards: Album of the Year (D'elles), French Song of the Year ("Et s'il n'en restait qu'une (je serais celle-là)"), and Female Artist of the Year. She also received the Honorary Award during the ceremony. In December 2007, she was nominated for Francophone Female Artist of the Year at the NRJ Music Awards and received the Honorary Award at the event. At the Juno Awards of 2008, Dion earned six nominations, including two specifically for D'elles: Album of the Year and Francophone Album of the Year.

== Track listing ==
No.	Title	Writer(s)	Producer(s)	Length
1.	"Et s'il n'en restait qu'une (je serais celle-là)"	Françoise Dorin; David Gategno	Gategno	3:31
2.	"Immensité"	Nina Bouraoui; Jacques Veneruso	Veneruso; Patrick Hampartzoumian	3:35
3.	"A cause"	Dorin; Veneruso	Veneruso; Thierry Blanchard	3:15
4.	"Je cherche l'ombre"	Lise Payette; Veneruso	Veneruso; Hampartzoumian	3:11
5.	"Les paradis"	Bouraoui; Gildas Arzel	Erick Benzi	3:54
6.	"La diva"	Denise Bombardier; Benzi	Benzi	4:22
7.	"Femme comme chacune"	Jovette Bernier; Benzi	Benzi	3:41
8.	"Si j'étais quelqu'un"	Nathalie Nechtschein; Benzi	Benzi	4:01
9.	"Je ne suis pas celle"	Christine Orban; Gategno	Gategno	4:11
10.	"Le temps qui compte"	Marie Laberge; Veneruso	Veneruso; Hampartzoumian	2:55
11.	"Lettre de George Sand à Alfred de Musset"	George Sand; Benzi	Benzi	4:31
12.	"On s'est aimé à cause"	Dorin; Marc Dupré; Jean-François Breau	Tino Izzo	4:04
13.	"Berceuse"	Janette Bertrand; Gategno	Gategno	2:41
Total length:				47:52

=== Notes ===
- "La diva" includes a fragment of Giacomo Puccini's opera La bohème performed by Maria Callas in 1956.
- "Lettre de George Sand à Alfred de Musset" is based on the 1834 letter from Sand to Alfred de Musset.
- The limited edition includes a bonus DVD with Céline parle d'elle(s).

== Personnel ==
- Michel Aimé – guitars
- Carla Antoun – cello
- Gildas Arzel – arranger, guitars, bass
- Christophe Battaglia – engineering
- Erick Benzi – producer, arranger, engineering, programming, piano, synthesizers, background vocals
- Thierry Blanchard – producer, engineering, programming, keyboards
- Hubert Bougis – orchestration
- Cécile Brillard – viola
- Nathalie Carlucci – viola
- Hervé Cavelier – violin
- Terry Chiazza – project coordination
- Caroline Collombel-Damas – violin
- Laurent Coppola – drums
- Christopher Deschamps – drums
- Dominic Despins – engineering
- Delphine Elbé – background vocals
- Sandrine François – background vocals
- David Gategno – producer, arranger, programming, keyboards, voice intro
- Humberto Gatica – engineering, mixing
- Emmanuel Guerrero – piano, string arrangements
- Cyril Guignier – viola
- Patrick Hampartzoumian – producer, arranger, engineering, programming
- Jean-Marc Haroutounian – bass
- Florence Hennequin – cello
- Tino Izzo – producer, arranger, engineering, programming, piano, keyboards, guitars, bass, percussion
- Adam Klemens – orchestra director
- Cenda Kotzmann – assistant engineer
- François-Éric Lalonde – assistant engineer
- Caroline Lasfargues – violin
- Vincent Lépée – assistant engineer
- Stéphane Lévy-B – engineering, mixing
- Claire Lisiecki – violin
- Didier Lizé – engineering
- Gildas Lointier – arranger, engineering
- Vito Luprano – executive producer
- Vlado Meller – mastering
- Vanessa Menneret – viola
- Simon Mercure – assistant engineer
- Nicolas Yvan Mingot – guitar
- George Pelekoudis – engineering
- Orchestre Philharmonique de Prague – orchestra
- Paris Pop Orchestra – orchestra
- Petr Pycha – orchestra contractor
- Stanislas – strings conductor, strings director, arranger
- Zizou Sadki – bass
- Constance Schacher – viola
- Mario Telaro – drums
- Jacques Veneruso – producer, arranger, guitars, background vocals
- Florence Veniant – violin
- Laurent Vernerey – bass

== Charts ==
=== Weekly charts ===
Weekly chart performance
Chart (2007)	Peak position
Belgian Albums (Ultratop Flanders)	18
Belgian Albums (Ultratop Wallonia)	1
Canadian Albums (Billboard)	1
Dutch Albums (Album Top 100)	50
European Albums (Music & Media)	10
French Albums (SNEP)	1
German Albums (Offizielle Top 100)	52
Greek Foreign Albums (IFPI)	27
Hungarian Albums (MAHASZ)	64
Italian Albums (FIMI)	35
Polish Albums (ZPAV)	26
Quebec (ADISQ)	1
Swiss Albums (Schweizer Hitparade)	3

=== Year-end charts ===
2007 year-end chart performance
Chart (2007)	Position
Belgian Albums (Ultratop Wallonia)	11
French Albums (SNEP)	21
Swiss Albums (Schweizer Hitparade)	46

2008 year-end chart performance
Chart (2008)	Position
French Albums (SNEP)	197

=== All-time charts ===
All-time chart performance
Chart	Position
Canadian Artists Albums (SoundScan)	124

== Certifications and sales ==
Certifications
Region	Certification	Certified units/sales
Belgium (BRMA)	Gold	15,000^{*}
Canada (Music Canada)	2× Platinum	200,000^{^}
France (SNEP)	Platinum	300,000
Russia (NFPF)	Gold	10,000^{*}
Switzerland (IFPI Switzerland)	Gold	15,000^{^}
^{*} Sales figures based on certification alone.^{^} Shipments figures based on certification alone.

== Release history ==
Release history
Region	Date	Label	Format	Catalog	Ref.
Europe	18 May 2007	Columbia	CD	88697047962	
Europe	18 May 2007	Columbia	CD/DVD	88697069102	
Europe	18 May 2007	Columbia	CD/DVD with postcards and perfume sample	88697073002	
Canada	22 May 2007	Columbia	CD	88697047962	
Canada	22 May 2007	Columbia	CD/DVD	88697069112	
Canada	22 May 2007	Columbia	CD/DVD with postcards and perfume sample	88697072992	
Japan	27 February 2008	SMEJ	CD	EICP-952	

== See also ==
- List of number-one albums of 2007 (Canada)
- List of number-one albums of 2007 (France)
