= On s'est aimé à cause =

2007 song by Celine Dion

Song by Celine Dion

from the album D'elles
- Language: French
- Released: 18 May 2007
- Studio: Piccolo (Montreal); Avatar (New York); Palms (Las Vegas); Blueroom (Laval)
- Genre: Pop
- Length: 4:04
- Label: Columbia
- Songwriters: Françoise Dorin; Marc Dupré; Jean-François Breau
- Producer: Tino Izzo

Audio
- "On s'est aimé à cause" on YouTube

"On s'est aimé à cause" (lit. 'We fell in love because') is a song by Canadian singer Celine Dion from her twenty-second studio album, D'elles (2007). Written by Françoise Dorin, Marc Dupré and Jean-François Breau, and produced by Tino Izzo, the track received radio airplay in Quebec despite not being released as a commercial single. It reached number five on the ADISQ Radio chart and number 23 on the Canadian Adult Contemporary chart in 2007. In 2018, it peaked at number three on the Quebec Digital Sales chart.

== Background and release ==
The lyrics were written by French novelist Françoise Dorin, while the music was composed by Canadian singer-songwriters Marc Dupré and Jean-François Breau. The track was produced by Canadian guitarist and producer Tino Izzo. Dion performed "On s'est aimé à cause" in May 2007 during a Canadian television special on TVA promoting the release of D'elles.

== Commercial performance ==
"On s'est aimé à cause" entered the BDS Radio chart on 25 August 2007, peaking at number six and remaining on the chart for 27 weeks. On the ADISQ Radio chart in Quebec, it reached number five. The song also entered Billboard's Canadian Adult Contemporary chart in September 2007, where it peaked at number 23 and spent 16 weeks on the chart. Following a performance on La Voix in April 2018, it debuted and peaked at number three on the ADISQ Digital Sales chart in Quebec.

== Charts ==
2007 chart performance
Chart (2007)	Peak position
Canada AC (Billboard)	23
Quebec Radio Songs (ADISQ)	5
Quebec Radio Songs (BDS)	6

2018 chart performance
Chart (2018)	Peak position
Quebec Digital Song Sales (ADISQ)	3

== A cause ==
"A cause"

Promotional single by Celine Dion

from the album D'elles
- Language: French
- Released: 22 January 2008
- Studio: Piccolo (Montreal); Avatar (New York); Palms (Las Vegas); Hauts de Gamme (Paris)
- Genre: Pop
- Length: 3:14 (album version); 3:18 (radio remix)
- Label: Columbia
- Songwriters: Françoise Dorin; Jacques Veneruso
- Producers: Jacques Veneruso; Thierry Blanchard

Audio
- "A cause" on YouTube

D'elles also includes a reworked version of "On s'est aimé à cause", titled "A cause" (lit. 'Because'). Dorin's lyrics were adapted for a dance-oriented arrangement. The music was composed by Jacques Veneruso, who produced the track with Thierry Blanchard. Dion performed "A cause" in France in May 2007 during a television special on TF1 promoting the album.

=== Background and release ===
"A cause" was remixed by French producer DJ Rien (Luc Bruaud). On 22 January 2008, it was announced that the remix would be promoted as the next single from D'elles in France. The promotional CD single included the album version, the radio edit remixed by DJ Rien, and "Alone" as the third track. An extended remix (3:41) was posted by DJ Rien on his Myspace page.

Dion had been expected to perform "A cause" on Star Academy on 25 January 2008. Instead, she performed "Alone" from her English-language album Taking Chances. On 7 February 2008, media outlets received a promotional envelope containing "Alone", replacing "A cause".
