= That's Just the Woman in Me =

- Starring: Celine Dion will.i.am Joe Walsh; Josh Groban
- Country of origin: United States
- No. of episodes: 1

Production
- Running time: 44 mins (w/o commercial breaks)

Original release
- Network: CBS
- Release: 15 February 2008

That's Just the Woman in Me is a one-off American television special by Canadian singer Celine Dion that was broadcast by CBS on 15 February 2008. It was recorded at the Wiltern Theatre in Los Angeles, California, on 12 January 2008. The program marked Dion's return to performing after five years in Las Vegas and promoted her studio album Taking Chances.

The special was Dion's fifth CBS concert broadcast since her 2003 Celine in Las Vegas, Opening Night Live special, which showed the Opening Night performance of her first Las Vegas residency, A New Day....

The show was assembled quickly following the success of An Audience with Celine Dion in the UK. It included Dion performing several of her well-known songs along with new material from Taking Chances. Special guests included:

- Olivia Trinidad Arias (widow of George Harrison)
- Joe Walsh (from The Eagles)
- David Foster (songwriter and producer)
- Halle Berry (Academy Award winner)
- Caroline Rhea (comedian)
- Corbin Bleu (from High School Musical)
- will.i.am (record producer, songwriter and member of The Black Eyed Peas)
- Josh Groban (singer)
- Jennifer Love Hewitt (actress, singer and songwriter)
- Ross McCall (actor)

The show's format resembled An Audience with..., with Dion answering questions from the audience. She opened with River Deep, Mountain High", followed by the first single from Taking Chances. She dedicated "The Power of Love" to the engaged couple Jennifer Love Hewitt and Ross McCall. Dion then performed "The Prayer" with Josh Groban. She demonstrated some beatboxing before performing an unreleased remix of "Eyes on Me" with will.i.am. She also performed the Beatles song "Something" with Joe Walsh on guitar, dedicating it to George Harrison's widow. Dion noted that the song held personal meaning because it was the first piece her son, René-Charles, learned to play on the piano. She later sang "Alone", written by Billy Steinberg and Tom Kelly and popularized by Heart. She closed the show with "That's Just the Woman in Me", a song she had wanted to record for more than 15 years. The song was originally recorded by fellow Eurovision Song Contest winners Katrina & The Waves.

Dion also performed a medley of "It's All Coming Back to Me Now", "Because You Loved Me", and "To Love You More". Additionally, "My Heart Will Go On" was performed as the encore, but these songs were cut from the broadcast.

== Set list ==
1. "River Deep, Mountain High"
2. "Taking Chances"
3. "The Power of Love"
4. "The Prayer" (with Josh Groban)
5. "Eyes on Me" (remix feat. will.i.am)
6. "Something" (with Joe Walsh on guitar)
7. "Alone"
8. "That's Just the Woman in Me"
