= Marie-Ève Janvier =

Canadian singer (born 1984)

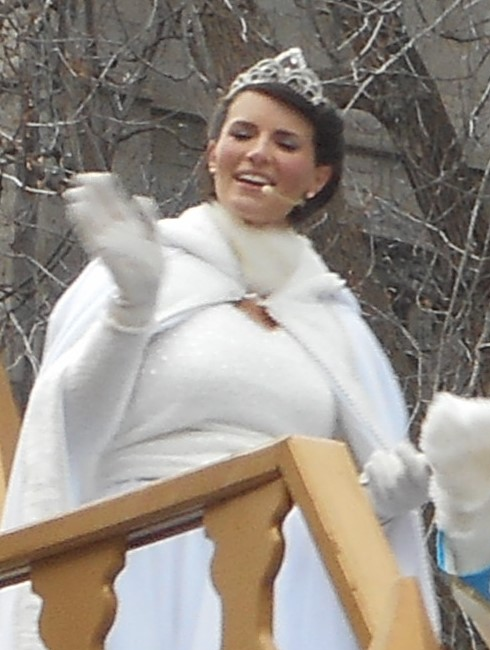
- Janvier in 2015

Background information
- Born: November 9, 1984 (age 41)
- Origin: Roxton Pond, Estrie, Quebec, Canada
- Occupation: Singer
- Years active: 2004–present
- Website: www.marieevejanvier.com www.marieeveetjeanfrancois.com

Marie-Ève Janvier is a Canadian singer from Quebec, born in 1984 in Roxton Pond, Estrie, Quebec.

== Biography ==
After taking part in the musical comedy Notre-Dame-de-Paris created by Luc Plamondon and Richard Cocciante when she was just 14, she played in Les Dix commandements at age 16. She had a lead role in musical Don Juan against the male lead role played by Jean-François Breau.

In 2007, she released her first sole self-titled album Marie-Ève Janvier with Mercury (Universal) France. The album was very successful and reached the Top 5 in Quebec Albums Chart.

In 2008, she toured Quebec with Jean-François Breau, her boyfriend. In the summer of 2009, they recorded their first joint album entitled Donner pour donner, followed in 2011 with a second joint album La vie à deux. Their joint single "J'ai un problème", a cover of a 1973 Johnny Hallyday and Sylvie Vartan song, became a big hit for Marie-Ève Janvier and Jean-François Breau.

They both took part in a revival of Don Juan in February 2012 where Janvier played the role of Maria against Breau in the role of Don Juan. This was followed by joint promotional tour called La vie à deux tour in Quebec in Spring 2012.

On March 3, 2016, having been a steady couple since 2004, Janvier and Breau welcomed their first child, Léa, into the world. Their second child, Laurence, was born on April 20, 2021.

== In popular culture ==
- In 2010, Janvier was part of the Ensemble pour Haïti French Canadian charity for aid for Haiti earthquake victims and performed in the charity concert and telethon

== Awards ==
Joint

- 2014: Five joint nominations for Marie-Ève Janvier / Jean-François Breau at Gala of ADISQ for "Best Group of Year", "Album of the Year - Best Sold", "Album of the Year - Reinterpretations", "Spectacle show of the year" all for Noël à deux and "TV Show of the Year - Music" for the programme C'est ma toune.

== Discography ==
=== Albums ===
Solo

- 2007: Marie-Ève Janvier

Marie-Eve Janvier and Jean-François Breau

- 2009: Donner pour donner
- 2011: La vie à deux
- 2013: Noël à deux
- 2014: Libre
- 2016: La route infinie

Featured in

- 1998: Princesse Sissi (Soundtrack)
- 2003: Brother Bear aka Mon frère l'ours (Soundtrack)
- 2003: Don Juan (Musical comedy)
- 2004: Don Juan (L'intégrale) (Musical comedy)

=== Singles ===
as duo Marie-Eve Janvier and Jean-François Breau

- 2011: "Tout pour être heureux"
- 2011: "J'ai un problème"
- 2012: "L'amour c'est comme l'été"
