= List of European number-one hits of 2007 =

This is a list of the European Hot 100 Singles and European Top 100 Albums number ones of 2007, as published by Billboard magazine.

== Chart history ==
Key
†	Indicates best-performing single and album of 2007

Issue date	Song	Artist	Album	Artist	Ref.
3 January	"Patience"	Take That	Love	The Beatles	
10 January	"All Good Things (Come to an End)"	Nelly Furtado	Love	The Beatles	
17 January	"Smack That"	Akon featuring Eminem	Loose †	Nelly Furtado	
24 January	"Hurt"	Christina Aguilera	No Promises	Carla Bruni	
31 January	"All Good Things (Come to an End)"	Nelly Furtado	Loose †	Nelly Furtado	
7 February	"All Good Things (Come to an End)"	Nelly Furtado	Not Too Late	Norah Jones	
14 February	"All Good Things (Come to an End)"	Nelly Furtado	Not Too Late	Norah Jones	
21 February	"All Good Things (Come to an End)"	Nelly Furtado	Not Too Late	Norah Jones	
28 February	"Ruby"	Kaiser Chiefs	Not Too Late	Norah Jones	
7 March	"The Sweet Escape"	Gwen Stefani featuring Akon	Not Too Late	Norah Jones	
14 March	"The Sweet Escape"	Gwen Stefani featuring Akon	Loose †	Nelly Furtado	
21 March	"The Sweet Escape"	Gwen Stefani featuring Akon	Loose †	Nelly Furtado	
28 March	"What Goes Around... Comes Around"	Justin Timberlake	Loose †	Nelly Furtado	
4 April	"What Goes Around... Comes Around"	Justin Timberlake	Loose †	Nelly Furtado	
11 April	"Girlfriend"	Avril Lavigne	Loose †	Nelly Furtado	
18 April	"Give It to Me"	Timbaland featuring Nelly Furtado and Justin Timberlake	Loose †	Nelly Furtado	
25 April	"Give It to Me"	Timbaland featuring Nelly Furtado and Justin Timberlake	The Best Damn Thing	Avril Lavigne	
2 May	"Beautiful Liar"	Beyoncé and Shakira	The Best Damn Thing	Avril Lavigne	
9 May	"Beautiful Liar"	Beyoncé and Shakira	Call Me Irresponsible	Michael Bublé	
16 May	"Beautiful Liar"	Beyoncé and Shakira	Call Me Irresponsible	Michael Bublé	
23 May	"Beautiful Liar"	Beyoncé and Shakira	Minutes to Midnight	Linkin Park	
30 May	"Beautiful Liar"	Beyoncé and Shakira	Minutes to Midnight	Linkin Park	
6 June	"Umbrella" †	Rihanna featuring Jay-Z	Minutes to Midnight	Linkin Park	
13 June	"Umbrella" †	Rihanna featuring Jay-Z	Minutes to Midnight	Linkin Park	
20 June	"Umbrella" †	Rihanna featuring Jay-Z	Lost Highway	Bon Jovi	
27 June	"Umbrella" †	Rihanna featuring Jay-Z	Lost Highway	Bon Jovi	
4 July	"Umbrella" †	Rihanna featuring Jay-Z	Lost Highway	Bon Jovi	
11 July	"Umbrella" †	Rihanna featuring Jay-Z	Lost Highway	Bon Jovi	
18 July	"Umbrella" †	Rihanna featuring Jay-Z	Loose †	Nelly Furtado	
25 July	"Umbrella" †	Rihanna featuring Jay-Z	Loose †	Nelly Furtado	
1 August	"Umbrella" †	Rihanna featuring Jay-Z	Life in Cartoon Motion	Mika	
8 August	"Umbrella" †	Rihanna featuring Jay-Z	Life in Cartoon Motion	Mika	
15 August	"Umbrella" †	Rihanna featuring Jay-Z	Life in Cartoon Motion	Mika	
22 August	"The Way I Are"	Timbaland featuring Keri Hilson	Life in Cartoon Motion	Mika	
29 August	"The Way I Are"	Timbaland featuring Keri Hilson	Life in Cartoon Motion	Mika	
5 September	"The Way I Are"	Timbaland featuring Keri Hilson	Life in Cartoon Motion	Mika	
12 September	"The Way I Are"	Timbaland featuring Keri Hilson	La Radiolina	Manu Chao	
19 September	"1973"	James Blunt	Curtis	50 Cent	
26 September	"1973"	James Blunt	All the Lost Souls	James Blunt	
3 October	"Ayo Technology"	50 Cent featuring Justin Timberlake and Timbaland	All the Lost Souls	James Blunt	
10 October	"Beautiful Girls"	Sean Kingston	Magic	Bruce Springsteen	
17 October	"Beautiful Girls"	Sean Kingston	Magic	Bruce Springsteen	
24 October	"Hey There Delilah"	Plain White T's	Magic	Bruce Springsteen	
31 October	"Don't Stop the Music"	Rihanna	Pictures	Katie Melua	
7 November	"Don't Stop the Music"	Rihanna	Blackout	Britney Spears	
14 November	"Don't Stop the Music"	Rihanna	Long Road Out of Eden	Eagles	
21 November	"Apologize"	Timbaland presents OneRepublic	Taking Chances	Celine Dion	
28 November	"Apologize"	Timbaland presents OneRepublic	Taking Chances	Celine Dion	
5 December	"Apologize"	Timbaland presents OneRepublic	Long Road out of Eden	Eagles	
12 December	"Apologize"	Timbaland presents OneRepublic	Long Road out of Eden	Eagles	
19 December	"Apologize"	Timbaland presents OneRepublic	Mothership	Led Zeppelin	
26 December	"Apologize"	Timbaland presents OneRepublic	Back to Black	Amy Winehouse	
