= Ensemble pour Haïti =

Ensemble pour Haïti ("Together for Haiti") was a French Canadian telethon that was held on January 22, 2010, at 8 PM ET / 9 PM AT. The special, a relief concert to help those affected by the 2010 Haiti earthquake, was simulcast on Radio-Canada, TVA, V, Télé-Québec, LCN, MusiquePlus, MusiMax and TV5, as well as on the Espace Musique, NRJ, RockDétente, Boom FM and Corus Québec radio networks. The event raised approximately CDN$6.65 million.

The two-hour event was hosted by Luck Mervil and France Beaudoin, and featured appearances by Annie Blanchard, Ariane Moffatt, Brigitte M, Bruno Pelletier, Daniel Boucher, Diane Dufresne, Doriane Fabreg (Doba), Elisapie, H'Sao, Gregory Charles, Lynda Thalie, Marc Hervieux, Marco Calliari, Marie-Chantal Toupin, Marie-Élaine Thibert, Marie-Ève Janvier and Jean-François Breau, Marie-Josée Lord, Marie-Jo Thériault, Mario Pelchat, Maxime Landry, Muzion, Nadja, Nomadic Massive, Paul Piché, Pierre Lapointe, Renée Martel, Roberto Lopez, Stéphanie Lapointe, Sylvain Cossette, Mapou Ginen and Wilfred LeBouthillier.

Viewers were encouraged to make a donation during the event, which will benefit the Canadian Red Cross and CECI ("Centre d’étude et de coopération internationale" (Canadian Centre for International Studies and Cooperation)).

Ensemble pour Haïti was broadcast the same evening as the Canadian anglophone appeal, Canada for Haiti at 7 PM ET, and was broadcast against the American broadcast, Hope for Haiti Now: A Global Benefit for Earthquake Relief.

== External links / Sources ==
- TVA: "Ensemble pour Haïti" (official site)
- Facebook: "Ensemble pour Haïti"
- Twitter: "Ensemble pour Haïti"
