= Marie Laberge =

Canadian comedian, educator and writer

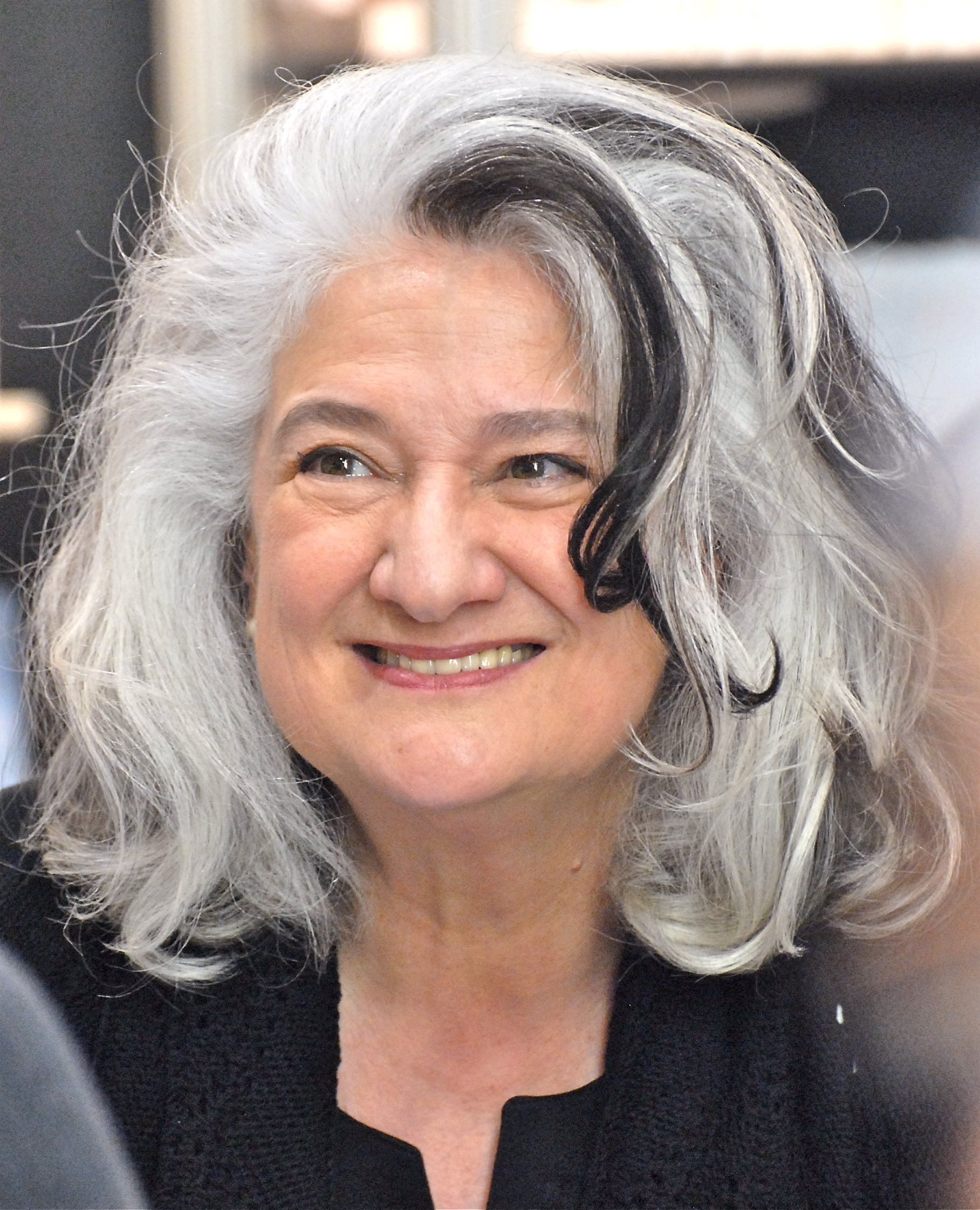
- Marie Laberge in 2011
- Born: November 29, 1950 (age 75); Quebec City, Quebec, Canada
- Education: Conservatoire d'art dramatique de Québec
- Occupations: Actress, writer

Marie Laberge (born November 29, 1950) is a Quebec actress, educator and writer.

== Biography ==
She was born in Quebec City and studied dance with Ludmilla Chiriaeff. Laberge began the study of journalism at Laval University but entered the Conservatoire d'art dramatique de Québec soon afterwards. She began work in comedy before branching out into playwriting, staging productions and teaching drama. From 1977 to 1980, Laberge was administrator for the Théâtre du Trident at Quebec City. From 1978 to 1981, she was administrator for the Centre d'essai des auteurs dramatiques (CEAD); she was president of CEAD from 1987 to 1989.

Laberge published a number of poetry collections during the 1960s that were generally not as well-received critically as her other work. Selected poetry from this period was published as Aux mouvances du temps: Poésie 1961-1971 (1981).

Her play C'était avant la guerre à l'Anse à Gilles won the Governor General's Award for French-language drama in 1981. In the same year, the play Éva et Évelyne was awarded second prize in the short production category by the Communauté radiophonique des programmes de langue française. Her plays are written in the way that people in Quebec speak French everyday as opposed to a more literary formal style of speech. In 1988, the French summer school at McGill University hosted an international colloquium on her work. In 2002, Laberge was named a Chevalier in the French Order of La Pléiade. She was named a Chevalier in the National Order of Quebec in 2004. In the same year, she became an Officier in the French Ordre des Arts et des Lettres.

Laberge wrote the lyrics for the Celine Dion song "Le temps qui compte" which was included on the D'elles album.

== Selected works ==
- L'Homme gris, play (1986), earned the author the grade of Chevalier in the Ordre des Arts et des Lettres
- Oublier, play (1987)
- Aurèlie, ma soeur, play (1988)
- Juillet, novel (1989)
- Le Faucon, play (1991)
- Quelques adieux, novel (1992), received the prize of the readers of Elle-Québec
- Le poids des ombres, novel (1994)
- Annabelle, novel (1996), received the Prix des Libraires du Québec in 1996 and the Ludger-Duvernay Prize in 1997
- La cérémonie des anges, novel (1998), received the Prix des Libraires du Québec in 1999
- Gabrielle (2000), first volume in the trilogy Le Goût du bonheur
- Adélaïde, novel (2001), second volume in the trilogy Le Goût du bonheur, received the Prix du Grand Public Salon du livre - La Presse
- Florent, novel (2002), third volume in the trilogy Le Goût du bonheur, received the Prix du Grand Public Salon du livre - La Presse
- Sans rien ni personne, novel (2007), received the Grand Prix littéraire Archambault
- Revenir de loin, novel (2011), received the Prix du Grand Public Salon du livre - La Presse
