= List of number-one albums of 2007 (Canada) =

These are the Canadian number-one albums of 2007. The chart is compiled by Nielsen Soundscan and published by Jam! Canoe, issued every Sunday. The chart also appears in Billboard magazine as Top Canadian Albums.

Billboard issue date	Albums			Alternative Albums		Country Albums		Hard Rock Albums		R&B Albums		Ref.
Billboard issue date	Title	Artist(s)	Sales	Title	Artist(s)	Title	Artist(s)	Title	Artist(s)	Title	Artist(s)	Ref.
January 6	Wintersong	Sarah McLachlan										
January 13	Love	The Beatles		Eminem Presents: The Re-Up	Various Artists	Some Hearts	Carrie Underwood	All the Right Reasons	Nickelback	Eminem Presents: The Re-Up	Various Artists	
January 20	MuchDance 2007	Various Artists										
January 27	FutureSex/LoveSounds	Justin Timberlake										
February 3	Loose	Nelly Furtado		Eminem Presents: The Re-Up	Various Artists	Some Hearts	Carrie Underwood	The Open Door	Evanescence	FutureSex/LoveSounds	Justin Timberlake	
February 10	Loose	Nelly Furtado										
February 17	Not Too Late	Norah Jones		The Sweet Escape	Gwen Stefani	Some Hearts	Carrie Underwood	Daughtry	Daughtry	FutureSex/LoveSounds	Justin Timberlake	
February 24	Not Too Late	Norah Jones										
March 3	Not Too Late	Norah Jones		Infinity on High	Fall Out Boy	Taking the Long Way	Dixie Chicks	Daughtry	Daughtry	FutureSex/LoveSounds	Justin Timberlake	
March 10	Not Too Late	Norah Jones										
March 17	Not Too Late	Norah Jones		Infinity on High	Fall Out Boy	Taking the Long Way	Dixie Chicks	Daughtry	Daughtry	FutureSex/LoveSounds	Justin Timberlake	
March 24	Neon Bible	Arcade Fire										
March 31	Live at Massey Hall 1971	Neil Young										
April 7	We Were Dead Before the Ship Even Sank	Modest Mouse										
April 14	Let It Go	Tim McGraw										
April 21	Comme Ça	Marie-Élaine Thibert		Infinity on High	Fall Out Boy	Let It Go	Tim McGraw	Them vs. You vs. Me	Finger Eleven	Shock Value	Timbaland	
April 28	Comme Ça	Marie-Élaine Thibert		Daughtry	Daughtry	Let It Go	Tim McGraw	Daughtry	Daughtry	Shock Value	Timbaland	
May 5	The Best Damn Thing	Avril Lavigne										
May 12	The Best Damn Thing	Avril Lavigne		The Best Damn Thing	Avril Lavigne	Some Hearts	Carrie Underwood	Year Zero	Nine Inch Nails	Shock Value	Timbaland	
May 19	Call Me Irresponsible	Michael Bublé	42,000	The Reminder	Feist	Some Hearts	Carrie Underwood	Snakes & Arrows	Rush	Shock Value	Timbaland	
May 26	Call Me Irresponsible	Michael Bublé	39,000	The Best Damn Thing	Avril Lavigne	Some Hearts	Carrie Underwood	Snakes & Arrows	Rush	Shock Value	Timbaland	
June 2	Minutes to Midnight	Linkin Park	50,000	Minutes to Midnight	Linkin Park	Some Hearts	Carrie Underwood	Minutes to Midnight	Linkin Park	Shock Value	Timbaland	
June 9	D'elles	Céline Dion	72,000	It Won't Be Soon Before Long	Maroon 5	Some Hearts	Carrie Underwood	Minutes to Midnight	Linkin Park	Shock Value	Timbaland	
June 16	D'elles	Céline Dion	24,000	Minutes to Midnight	Linkin Park	Some Hearts	Carrie Underwood	Minutes to Midnight	Linkin Park	Shock Value	Timbaland	
June 23	Good Girl Gone Bad	Rihanna	17,000	Minutes to Midnight	Linkin Park	Some Hearts	Carrie Underwood	Minutes to Midnight	Linkin Park	Good Girl Gone Bad	Rihanna	
	Duos Dubois	Claude Dubois	14,000	Era Vulgaris	Queens of the Stone Age	Some Hearts	Carrie Underwood	Minutes to Midnight	Linkin Park	Good Girl Gone Bad	Rihanna	
July 7	Lost Highway	Bon Jovi	50,000	Icky Thump	The White Stripes	5th Gear	Brad Paisley	Minutes to Midnight	Linkin Park	Good Girl Gone Bad	Rihanna	
July 14	Lost Highway	Bon Jovi		Icky Thump	The White Stripes	5th Gear	Brad Paisley	Minutes to Midnight	Linkin Park	Good Girl Gone Bad	Rihanna	
July 21	Lost Highway	Bon Jovi	16,000									
July 28	Zeitgeist	The Smashing Pumpkins	15,000									
August 4	Lost Highway	Bon Jovi	11,000	Zeitgeist	The Smashing Pumpkins	Some Hearts	Carrie Underwood	Zeitgeist	The Smashing Pumpkins	Good Girl Gone Bad	Rihanna	
August 11	Underclass Hero	Sum 41	9,000	Underclass Hero	Sum 41	Some Hearts	Carrie Underwood	Minutes to Midnight	Linkin Park	Good Girl Gone Bad	Rihanna	
August 18	Hospital Music	Matthew Good	11,000	Hospital Music	Matthew Good	Some Hearts	Carrie Underwood	Untitled	Korn	Good Girl Gone Bad	Rihanna	
August 25	Good Girl Gone Bad	Rihanna	7,000									
	High School Musical 2	Soundtrack	20,000	Back to Black	Amy Winehouse	Some Hearts	Carrie Underwood	Minutes to Midnight	Linkin Park	Good Girl Gone Bad	Rihanna	
September 8	High School Musical 2	Soundtrack	16,000	Street Gospels	Bedouin Soundclash	Some Hearts	Carrie Underwood	Minutes to Midnight	Linkin Park	Shock Value	Timbaland	
September 15	High School Musical 2	Soundtrack										
September 22	High School Musical 2	Soundtrack	7,000									
September 29	Graduation	Kanye West	54,000	Back to Black	Amy Winehouse	Risk	Paul Brandt	Minutes to Midnight	Linkin Park	Graduation	Kanye West	
October 6	All the Lost Souls	James Blunt	35,500									
October 13	Echoes, Silence, Patience & Grace	Foo Fighters	22,000									
October 20	Magic	Bruce Springsteen	25,000									
October 27	Noël	Josh Groban	13,000	Rock n Roll Jesus	Kid Rock	Reba: Duets	Reba McEntire	Rock n Roll Jesus	Kid Rock	Graduation	Kanye West	
November 3	Noël	Josh Groban	12,000									
November 10	Carnival Ride	Carrie Underwood	17,000									
November 17	Blackout	Britney Spears										
November 24	The Ultimate Hits	Garth Brooks		Famous Last Words	Hedley	The Ultimate Hits	Garth Brooks	Aveneged Sevenfold	Avenged Sevenfold	American Gangster	Jay-Z	
December 1	Taking Chances	Céline Dion	80,000	Sawdust	The Killers	The Ultimate Hits	Garth Brooks	Mothership	Led Zeppelin	As I Am	Alicia Keys	
December 8	Taking Chances	Céline Dion	44,000									
December 15	Noël	Josh Groban	46,000	Famous Last Words	Hedley	The Ultimate Hits	Garth Brooks	Mothership	Led Zeppelin	As I Am	Alicia Keys	
December 22	Noël	Josh Groban	53,000									
December 29	Noël	Josh Groban	75,000	The Best Damn Thing	Avril Lavigne	The Ultimate Hits	Garth Brooks	Mothership	Led Zeppelin	As I Am	Alicia Keys	

== See also ==
- List of Canadian number-one singles of 2007
- List of Hot 100 number-one singles of 2007 (Canada)
