= Avec un grand A =

- Genre: Drama
- Created by: Janette Bertrand
- Written by: Janette Bertrand
- Directed by: Pierre Gagnon (23 Eps.); Nicole Faucher (12 Eps.); André David (10 Eps.); Louis Choquette (7 Eps.)
- Theme music composer: François Guy
- Country of origin: Canada
- Original language: French
- No. of seasons: 11
- No. of episodes: 52

Production
- Production locations: Montreal, Quebec, Canada

Original release
- Network: Radio-Québec
- Release: February 19, 1986 – March 22, 1996

Avec un grand A is a French-Canadian drama television series comprising 52 episodes which aired from February 19, 1986 to March 22, 1996 on Télé-Québec. Created and written by Janette Bertrand, the series dealt with issues impacting romance and/or relationships, with each episode tackling a different subject and featuring different characters and situations. Some notable subjects included being closeted and married, prostitution, illness, rape, domestic violence and suicide.

Although not its official title, the series is sometimes referred to as L'amour avec un grand A (Love With a Capital "L") because the series' DVD set released in 2005, featuring ten episodes, had that title on the box. It is also the title of the series' theme song, sung by Ginette Reno.
