= Eyes on Me (Celine Dion song) =

Single by Celine Dion

from the album Taking Chances
- Released: 7 January 2008
- Studio: At the Palms (Las Vegas); CMK
- Genre: Pop; worldbeat
- Length: 3:53 (album version); 3:40 (radio edit)
- Label: Columbia
- Songwriters: Kristian Lundin; Savan Kotecha; Delta Goodrem
- Producer: Kristian Lundin

Celine Dion singles chronology
| "Taking Chances" (2007) | "Eyes on Me" (2008) | "A World to Believe In" (2008) |

Music video
- "Eyes on Me" on YouTube

"Eyes on Me" is a song recorded by Canadian singer Celine Dion for her tenth English‑language studio album, Taking Chances (2007). Written by Kristian Lundin, Savan Kotecha, and Australian singer Delta Goodrem, the track incorporates Middle Eastern elements, with Goodrem also contributing backing vocals. Lundin, who had previously worked with Dion on "That's the Way It Is" and "I'm Alive", produced the recording. The song was issued as the second single in the United Kingdom on 7 January 2008, while "Alone" was selected as the second single in the rest of Europe and North America.

Dion performed "Eyes on Me" on An Audience with Celine Dion, broadcast in the UK on ITV on 22 December 2007, and later presented a remix version during her CBS special That's Just the Woman in Me on 15 February 2008, where she appeared with will.i.am of The Black Eyed Peas. The music video, released on 5 May 2008, uses footage from the Taking Chances World Tour in Africa and Asia.

== Background and release ==
"Eyes on Me" was written by Kristian Lundin, Savan Kotecha, and Australian recording artist Delta Goodrem, with production handled by Lundin, who had earlier worked with Dion on "That's the Way It Is" and "I'm Alive". Goodrem also contributes backing vocals. The recording adopts a Middle-Eastern-influenced arrangement, and its lyrics frame a light, flirtatious exchange in which a self-assured narrator challenges her partner's attention, exemplified by the line: "Temptation is all around... you better keep your eyes on me".

The track was released in the United Kingdom on 7 January 2008 as the album's second single, issued in both digital and CD formats. In other European markets and in North America, "Alone" was selected as the second single instead. The UK single included a remix by Ashanti Boyz, whose recent credits included reworkings of Jennifer Lopez tracks "Do It Well" and "Hold It Don't Drop It".

In 2008, "Eyes on Me" was added to the European edition of My Love: Ultimate Essential Collection. A live performance was later included on the Taking Chances World Tour: The Concert CD/DVD.

== Critical reception ==
Critical response to the song was generally positive, and several reviewers noted similarities to Shakira's work. Stephen Thomas Erlewine of AllMusic wrote that "Celine tries to shimmy like Shakira on 'Eyes on Me'," while Sarah Rodman of The Boston Globe remarked that "Eyes On Me colors a bit outside the lines with an irresistibly wiggly, Eastern-flavored groove. (Shakira will kick herself for not getting it first.)" Ashante Infantry of the Toronto Star described the track as an "urban pop bounce, where Celine is channelling her inner Shakira". Nick Levine of Digital Spy wrote that the song "finds Dion taking an ill-advised swerve towards Shakira territory in pursuit of that all-important comeback smash. As ever, the Canadian belter is on ripe old form, tearing into the hackneyed lyrics with real spirit".

== Commercial performance ==
"Eyes on Me" was released as a commercial single only in the United Kingdom, where it received limited promotion and peaked at number 113 on the UK Singles Chart and number 25 in Scotland. The song also appeared on Finnish charts in July 2008, reaching number 15 on the national radio chart and number 24 on the downloads chart. In other countries, "Alone" was selected as the second single.

== Music video ==
The music video for "Eyes on Me" premiered on 5 May 2008 and consists of a montage of footage from the Taking Chances World Tour in Africa and Asia. The video combines concert material with behind-the-scenes footage, showing Dion on stage and interacting with audiences during the tour.

== Live performances ==
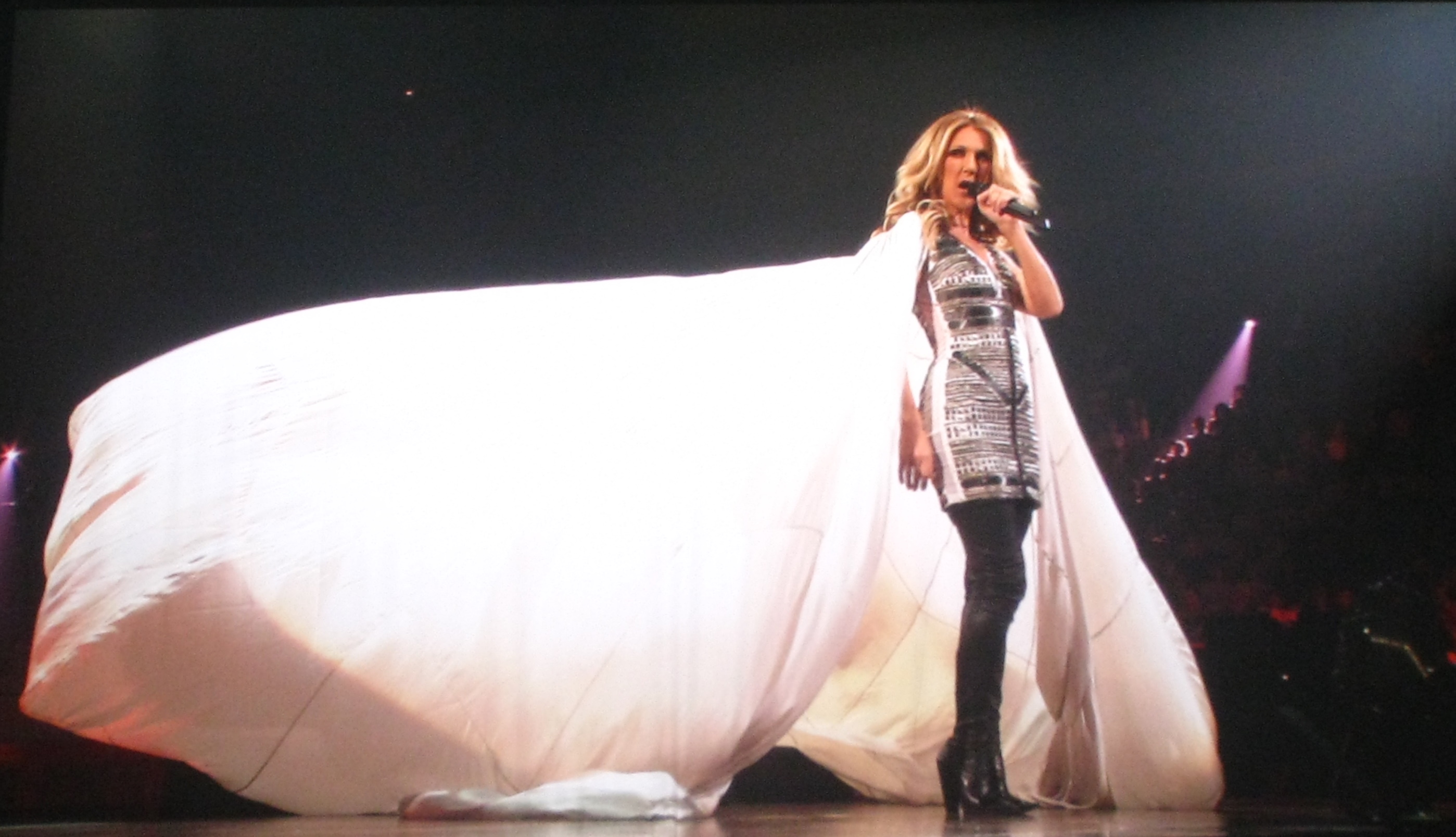
Celine Dion performing "Eyes on Me".

Dion performed the song during An Audience with Celine Dion, which aired in the UK on ITV on 22 December 2007. She also performed a remix with will.i.am of The Black Eyed Peas during her CBS special, That's Just the Woman in Me, broadcast in the US on 15 February 2008. The song was also used in a television commercial for Dion's fragrance Sensational.

== Formats and track listing ==
- UK CD and digital single
1. "Eyes on Me" (album version) – 3:53
2. "Eyes on Me" (Ashanti Boyz club remix) – 6:38
3. "Eyes on Me" (in studio video) – 6:22

== Credits and personnel ==
Recording locations

- Recording – CMK Studios (Los Angeles, California)
- Studio at the Palms (Paradise, Nevada)

Personnel

- Kristian Lundin – songwriting, production, mixing, guitars, bass, backing vocals
- Savan Kotecha – songwriting
- Delta Goodrem – songwriting, backing vocals
- Ned Douglas – keyboards and programming
- Karl Engström – guitars
- Sebastian Thott – guitars

Credits adapted from the liner notes of Taking Chances, Columbia Records.

== Charts ==
Chart performance
| Chart (2008) | Peak position |
|---|---|
| CIS Airplay (TopHit) | 194 |
| Finland (Suomen virallinen radiosoittolista) | 15 |
| Finland Download (Latauslista) | 24 |
| Scottish Singles Sales (Official Charts) | 25 |
| UK Singles (Official Charts Company) | 113 |
| Ukraine Airplay (TopHit) | 159 |

== Release history ==
Release history
| Region | Date | Format | Label | Ref. |
|---|---|---|---|---|
| United Kingdom | 7 January 2008 | CD; digital download | Columbia | |
