= Lynda Thalie =

Canadian singer (born 1978)

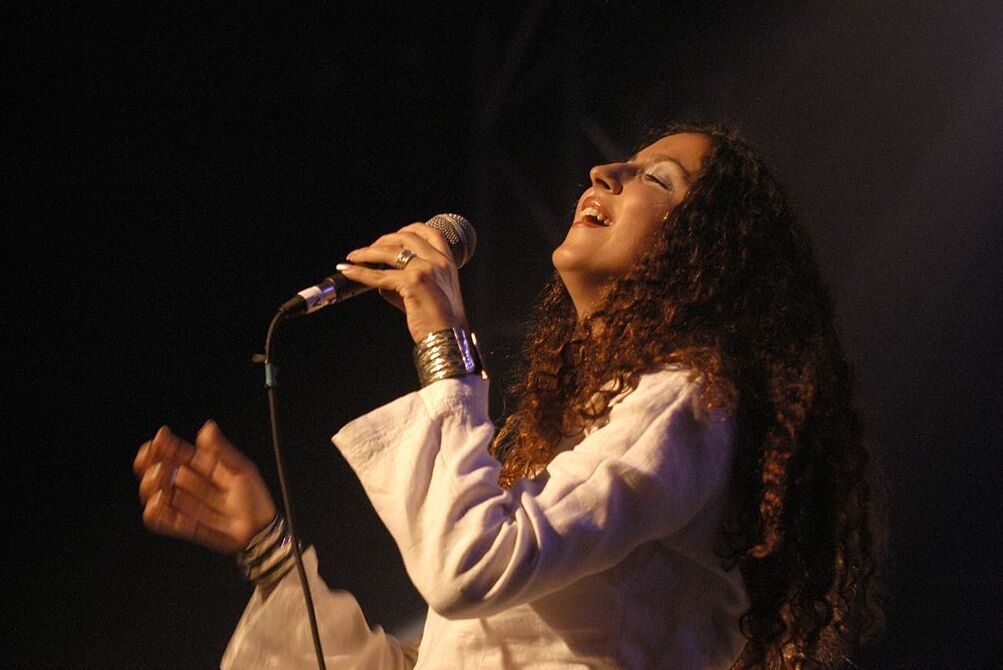
- Thalie performing in 2006

Background information
- Born: 25 June 1978 (age 48); Oran, Algeria
- Genres: Pop; fusion
- Occupations: Singer; songwriter; author
- Instrument: Vocals
- Years active: 2002–present
- Website: lyndathalie.com

Lynda Thalie (born on 25 June 1978) is a Canadian singer-songwriter of Algerian origin. Her family immigrated to Canada and resided in Quebec province since 1994. She has released three albums and has also written her autobiography entitled Survivre aux naufrages published in 2011.

== In popular culture ==
- Radio-Canada and RDI picked her as one of 4 Algero-Canadian personalities for its documentary series Mon Algérie et la vôtre. She also visited Algeria for the occasion recounting her experiences of homecoming after so many years.
- Her 2009 single "Rallye aicha des Gazelles" is the theme song for the Moroccan Rallye Aicha des Gazelles for the year, a rally event reserved only for women.
- In 2010, she took part, alongside many other Canadian artists in Ensemble pour Haïti ("Together for Haiti"), a French Canadian telethon that was held on 22 January 2010 in aid of victims of the 2010 Haiti earthquake.
- She has provided vocals for the soundtrack of films by Michel Cusson of Cité-Amérique and the National Film Board of Canada

== Appearances ==
- In 2002, she was featured in Les FrancoFolies de Montréal
- In July 2009, she appeared in the Montreal International Jazz Festival
- She took part in francophony celebrations in the 2010 Winter Olympics in Vancouver, the 2012 Summer Olympics in London. and francophony in Greece.
- She has collaborated with a number of artists and most notably Enrico Macias as she sang with him in Les FrancoFolies de Montréal in Montreal in 2006, opening for him in Place des Arts in Montreal and singing with him in L'Olympia in Paris and in Cairo, Egypt.

== Awards and nominations ==
- 2000: Laureate at Ma première Place des Arts held at Montreal's Place des Arts, an event for upcoming Quebec artists
- 2004: Prix du patrimoine d'expression (Québec)
- 2006: Nominated during ADSIQ awards for "Best World Music Album" for her self-titled album Lynda Thalie
- 2009: Won "World Music Artist of the Year" award for her general work and "Francophone Album of the Year" for her album La rose des sables during the Sounds of Blackness Awards in Montreal

== Personal life ==
Lynda Thalie never knew her father close, as he had left the family when she was young never to return again. Thalie emigrated to Canada with her mother and brother. She recounts the devastating effect of the loss of her father on her and her family. In her autobiographical book Survivre aux naufrages she also details a suicide attempt. She said in an interview that the book in its honesty served as a redeeming experience for her. Thalie is a mother of twin children Dahlia and Liam.

== Discography ==
Albums

- Sablier (2002)
- Lynda Thalie (2005)
- La rose des sables (2008)
- Nomadia (2013)

Singles

- "Rallye Aicha des Gazelles" (2009)
- "Dance your pain away (La tête haute)" (2013)

== Bibliography ==
- Survivre aux naufrages (2011)

== Theatre ==
- Le Petit Prince as La rose (2004)

== Notes ==
- Radio Canada presentations – Mon Algérie et la vôtre
