= Janette Bertrand =

Canadian journalist, actor, educator and writer (born 1925)

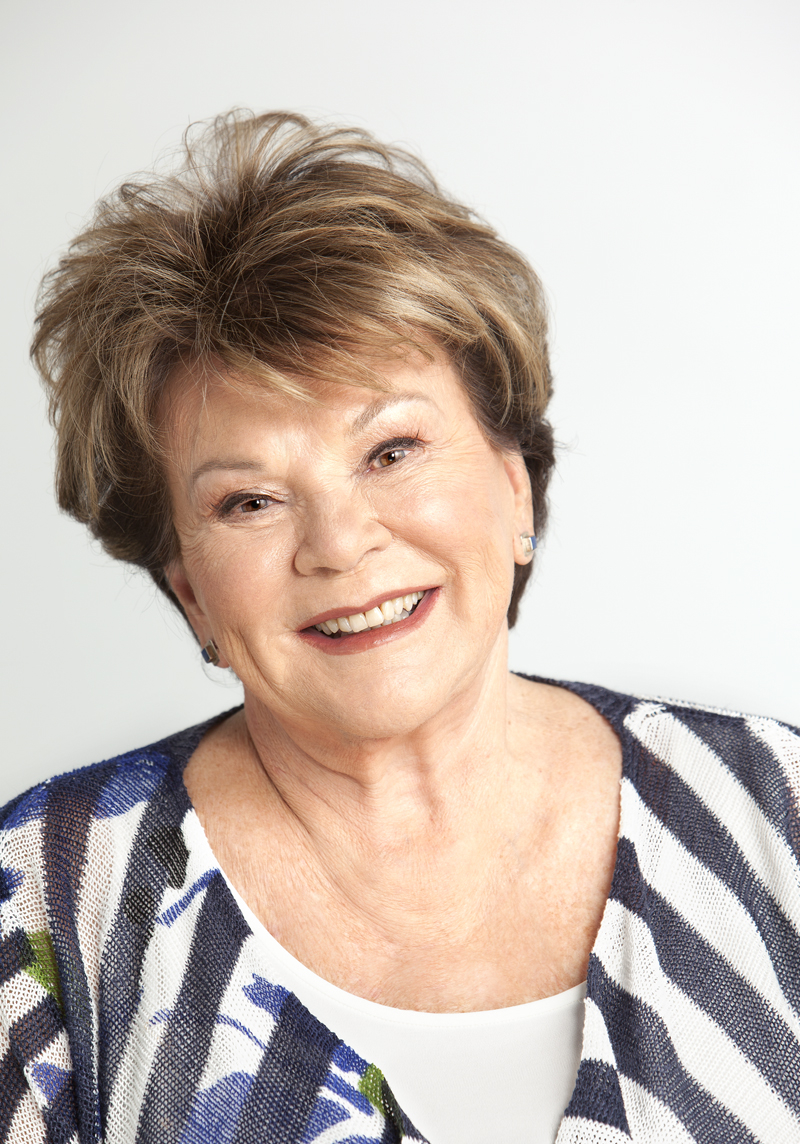
- Born: March 25, 1925 (age 101); Montreal, Quebec, Canada
- Occupations: Journalist; actress; educator; writer
- Years active: 1954–present
- Spouse: Jean Lajeunesse (m. 1947; died 1991)
- Children: 3
- Awards: Prix Gémeaux

Janette Bertrand CC CQ (born March 25, 1925) is a Quebec journalist, actress, educator, and writer.

== Biography ==
She was born in Montreal, grew up there, and studied journalism at the Université de Montréal. She began work at Le Petit Journal, working there for 16 years. She next moved to radio, becoming the host of the Radio-Canada program Déjeuner en musique in the early 1950s. Bertrand married the actor Jean Lajeunesse. The couple hosted the program Jean et Janette, and then Mon mari et nous at radio station CKAC. Later, she began appearing on television for Radio-Canada, Télé-Métropole and Radio-Québec. She developed the television series Grand-Papa, L'Amour avec un Grand A, and Parler pour parler.

Bertrand wrote the lyrics for the Celine Dion song "Berceuse", which was included on the D'Elles album.

Bertrand supported the Parti Québécois' proposed Charter of Values, arguing that accommodating religious minorities could lead to the erosion of women's rights. Janette turned 100 on March 25, 2025.

== Awards ==
Bertrand received a Governor General's Performing Arts Awards in 2000. She also received several Gemini Awards, including one for Lifetime Achievement, the Order of Merit from the Canadian Association of Radio Broadcasters, was named a Chevalier in the National Order of Quebec in 1992, and was named Woman of the Century by the Salon de la femme de Montréal in 1990.

In 2003, she received the Prix Condorcet, which is awarded annually to a public figure who has contributed to secularity and freedom of conscience in Quebec.

She was appointed an Officer of the Order of Canada in 2002, and in 2020 was elevated to Companion.

== Selected works ==
- Moi Tarzan, Toi Jane, play
- Dis moi si j'dérange, play
- Ma vie en trois actes, biography (2004)
