= Taking Chances =

Studio album by Celine Dion
- Released: 7 November 2007
- Recorded: 2007
- Studios: CMK, Conway, Westlake (Los Angeles); Decibel (Stockholm); Henson Recording (Hollywood); At the Palms (Las Vegas); The Carrington House (Atlanta); The Studio (Philadelphia)
- Genre: Pop
- Length: 65:28
- Label: Columbia
- Producers: Peer Åström; Anders Bagge; Kara DioGuardi; Chuck Harmony; David Hodges; Emanuel Kiriakou; Kristian Lundin; Ben Moody; Christopher Neil; Aldo Nova; Linda Perry; Guy Roche; John Shanks; Tricky Stewart

Celine Dion chronology
D'elles (2007)	Taking Chances (2007)	Complete Best (2008)

Singles from Taking Chances
- 1. "Taking Chances" Released: 18 September 2007; 2. "Eyes on Me" Released: 4 January 2008; 3. "A World to Believe In" Released: 16 January 2008; 4. "Alone" Released: 5 May 2008

Taking Chances is the twenty-third studio album and tenth English-language album by Canadian singer Celine Dion. It was released by Columbia Records on 7 November 2007. It marked Dion's return to recording after nearly five years of performing in Las Vegas and was recorded mainly over three weeks in the city. The album combines pop and rock influences with original material and covers such as "Alone" and "Right Next to the Right One", featuring collaborations with a wide range of prominent songwriters and producers, including John Shanks, Linda Perry, David Hodges, Ben Moody, and Dave Stewart.

The album received mixed reviews, with critics praising Dion's grittier sound and willingness to explore new musical styles, while others found the reinvention unconvincing and overly polished. Commercially, Taking Chances was highly successful, debuting at number one in Canada, South Africa, and Switzerland, and number three in the United States, while also reaching the top 10 in numerous other countries. It was certified platinum or multi-platinum in several markets and sold over 3.1 million copies worldwide in 2007 alone, making it one of the year's best-selling albums by a female artist.

The album's lead single, "Taking Chances", was released in September 2007 and reached the top 10 in several European countries and Canada. Different markets later received different singles, including "Eyes on Me" in the UK, "A World to Believe In" in Japan, and "Alone" in North America and the UK. Dion heavily promoted the album through international television performances and appearances before launching the year-long Taking Chances World Tour, which visited five continents and grossed over $279 million, becoming one of the highest-grossing tours of all time.

== Background ==
On 24 August 2007, Dion's official website announced that she would release her new English‑language album, Taking Chances, on 12 November 2007 in Europe and 13 November 2007 in North America. The album was also scheduled for release in Japan on 7 November 2007, and in Australia and New Zealand on 10 November 2007. Dion said about Taking Chances: "I think it represents a positive evolution in my career. I'm feeling strong, maybe a little gutsier than in the past, and just as passionate about music and life as I ever was". On 2 September 2007, the album's cover became available to TeamCeline members. Six days later, Columbia Records made small changes to the Taking Chances cover.

The first single from the album, "Taking Chances", was sent to radio stations on 10 September 2007, and a video showing Dion recording the song in the studio was posted on Amazon.com. On 12 September 2007, Columbia Records stated in a press release that "Taking Chances" was written by Kara DioGuardi and Eurythmics' Dave Stewart, produced by Grammy Award–winner John Shanks, and that the album would be supported by the Taking Chances World Tour in 2008 and 2009. The music video for the first single was filmed on 17 September 2007 in several locations in the Las Vegas area and directed by Paul Boyd. The video became available to TeamCeline members on 16 October 2007, and later premiered on television.

== Content ==
The album was recorded mainly over a three‑week period in July 2007 at Palm Studios in Las Vegas. Dion worked with a group of well-known songwriters and producers, including Linda Perry, Eurythmics' Dave Stewart, former Evanescence member Ben Moody, Ne-Yo, John Shanks, Kara DioGuardi, Kristian Lundin, Anders Bagge, Peer Åström, Aldo Nova, Tricky Stewart, and Christopher Neil. One of Dion's favorite songs on the album is "That's Just the Woman in Me", written by Kimberley Rew, a former member of Katrina and the Waves. The song had been offered to Dion 15 years earlier, but she felt it suited her artistic direction only when she began working on the new album. Dion said: "I think this album represents a positive evolution in my career. As time goes by, and we have more experiences in life, it's easier to get in touch with our innermost feelings... to know more about what we really want, how we really feel". Other covers on the album include Heart's "Alone", Platinum Weird's "Taking Chances", Linda Perry's "New Dawn", and Tim Christensen's "Right Next to the Right One".

== Singles ==
The first single from the album, "Taking Chances", premiered on 10 September 2007 and was sent to radio stations around the world on the same day. The song was written by Kara DioGuardi and Dave Stewart, and produced by John Shanks. The digital single was released on 17 September 2007, and the CD single was issued in selected countries in late October and early November 2007. The music video, directed by Paul Boyd, was filmed in mid-September 2007 in Las Vegas and premiered on 17 October 2007. "Taking Chances" became a successful single in Europe, peaking inside the top 10 in Denmark, Italy, Switzerland, and France, and reaching the top 40 in Austria, Norway, Germany, Belgium's Wallonia, Ireland, and the United Kingdom. In North America, it peaked at number nine on the Canadian Hot 100 and number 54 on the US Billboard Hot 100. "Taking Chances" also reached number one on the US Hot Dance Club Songs and the Canadian Adult Contemporary Chart. It has sold over 20,000 digital downloads in Canada, receiving gold certification, and 500,000 digital copies in the United States.

In the United Kingdom, "Eyes on Me" was chosen as the second single. The song was written by Kristian Lundin, Savan Kotecha, and Delta Goodrem, and produced by Lundin. The digital single was released on 4 January 2008, and the CD single was issued on 7 January 2008. The song peaked at number 113 on the UK Singles Chart. The music video for "Eyes on Me", using footage from the Taking Chances World Tour, was released on 5 May 2008. In Japan, "A World to Believe In", written by Tino Izzo and Rosanna Ciciola and produced by John Shanks, was selected as the second track to promote the album. It was re-recorded as an English–Japanese duet with Yuna Ito, titled "あなたがいる限り: A World to Believe In". The song premiered on radio on 1 December 2007, and the music video debuted two days later. The video was filmed in Las Vegas in October 2007 during the recording of the duet. The CD single was issued on 16 January 2008 and peaked at number eight on the Japanese Oricon chart.

The music video for the second North American single, "Alone", was taken from the That's Just the Woman in Me television special and released on 15 March 2008. The promotional single was sent to radio stations in Canada and the United States on 12 March 2008. This cover of Heart's hit song was produced by Ben Moody. "Alone" was also chosen as the third and final single in the United Kingdom and was digitally released on 5 May 2008. The song peaked at number 57 on the Canadian Hot 100, number 85 on the UK Singles Chart, and number 24 on the US Bubbling Under Hot 100 Singles. "My Love", written and produced by Linda Perry, was included on Dion's next album, My Love: Essential Collection, and released as a single from it in September 2008.

== Promotion ==
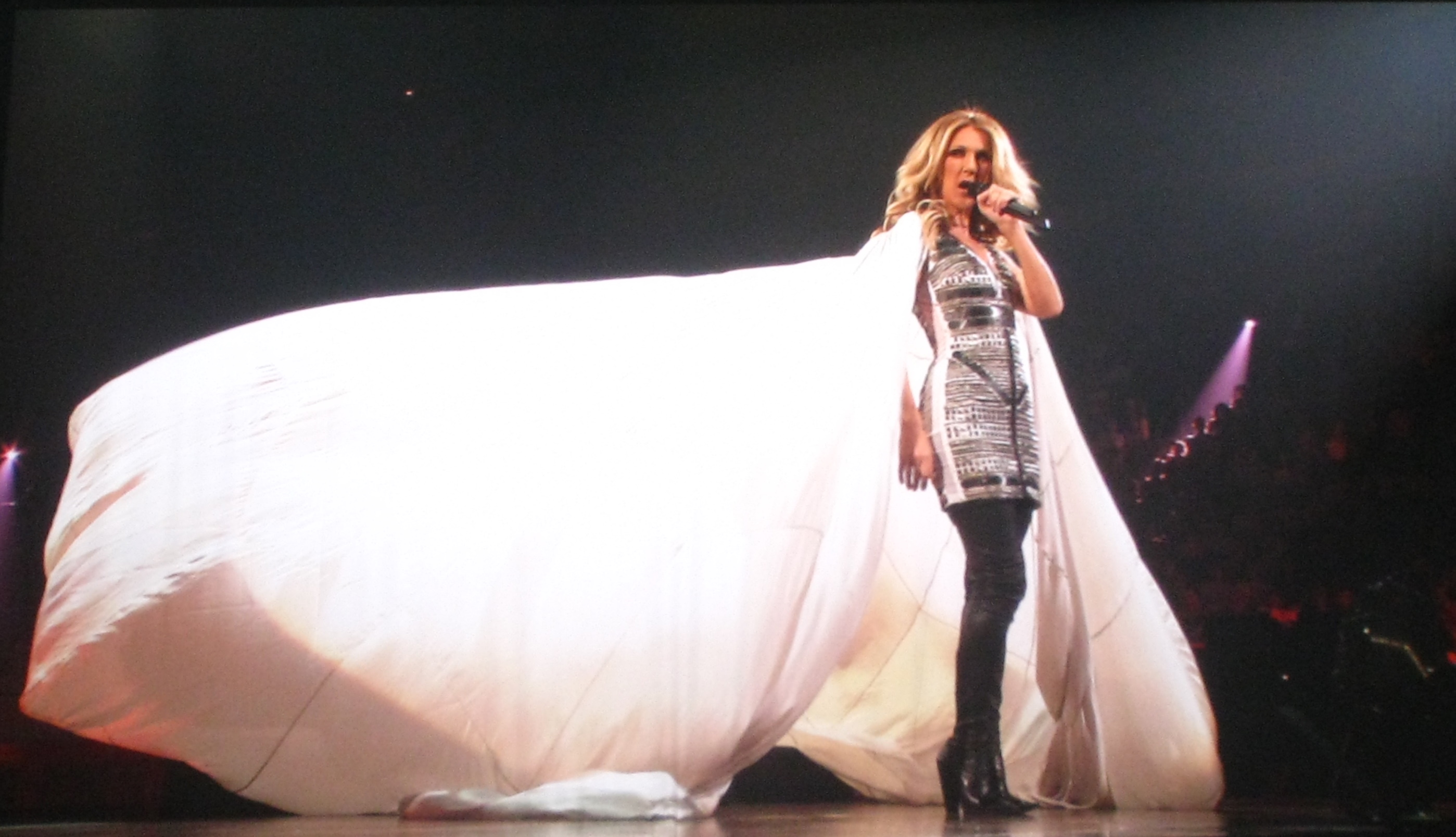
Dion on stage performing "Eyes on Me" during her Taking Chances Tour stop in Montréal in August 2008.

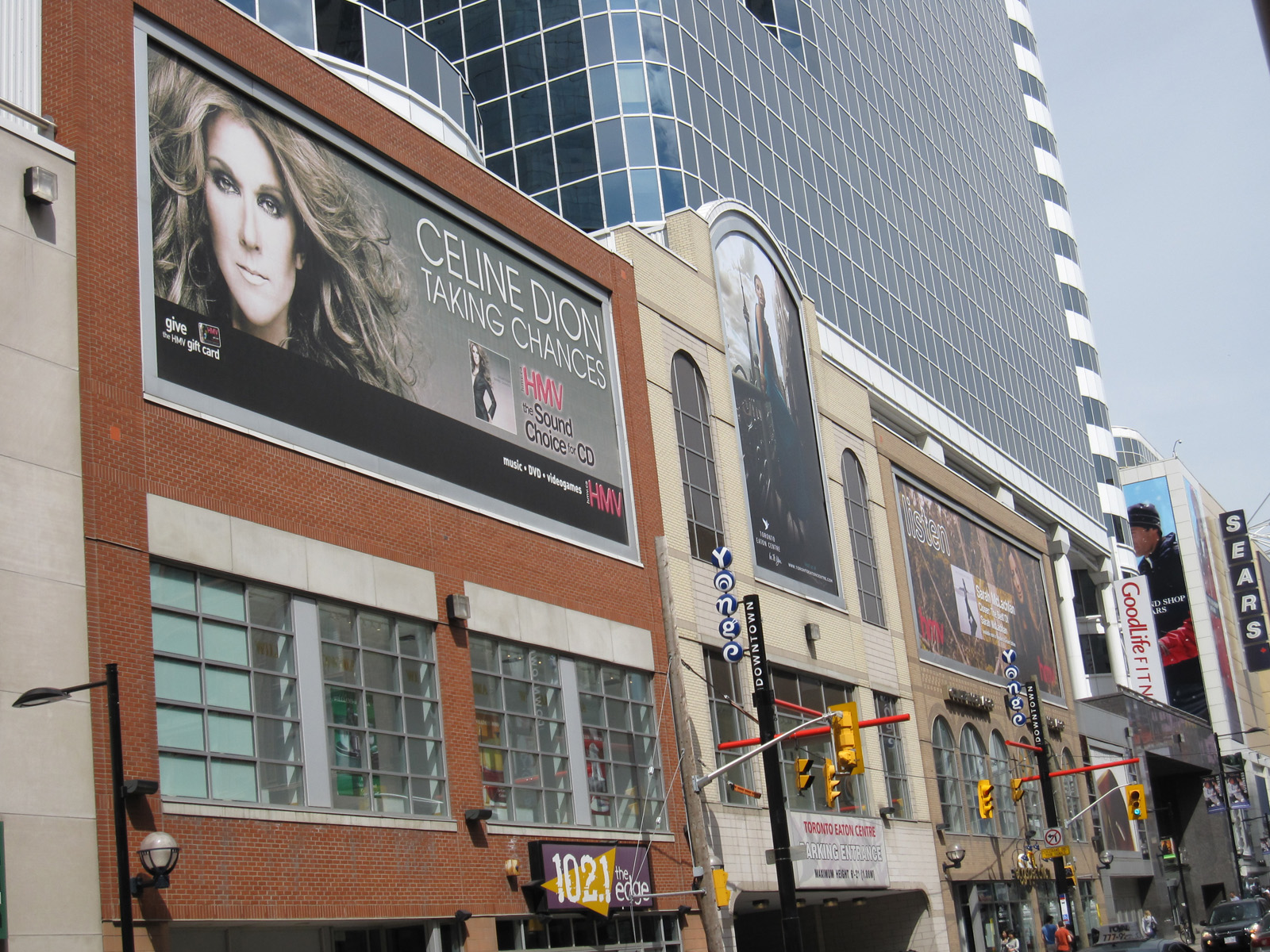
An advertising billboard for Taking Chances outside the Toronto Eaton Centre in May 2009.

Dion visited the United Kingdom in late October 2007 and began promoting the album by performing "Taking Chances" on The X Factor on 27 October 2007. She later performed "Alone" and "Taking Chances" on Saturday Night Divas, broadcast on 3 November 2007. Dion also recorded An Audience with Celine Dion, broadcast on 22 December 2007, where she performed "Taking Chances", "Eyes on Me", "Alone", and several of her earlier hits, including "My Heart Will Go On", "Think Twice", a medley of "It's All Coming Back to Me Now", "Because You Loved Me", and "To Love You More", "I Drove All Night", "River Deep, Mountain High", and "The Prayer" in a duet with Andrea Bocelli.

Next, Dion visited France and performed "Taking Chances" and two of her French-language hits with contestants on Star Academy on 2 November 2007. She also recorded performances of "Taking Chances" for two other French television programs, Hit Machine and Vivement Dimanche, broadcast on 1 December 2007 and 9 December 2007 respectively. On 4 November 2007, Dion travelled to Monaco where she received the Legend Award at the World Music Awards and performed "Taking Chances". The performance was broadcast on 22 November 2007. On 7 November 2007, Dion visited Italy and performed "Taking Chances" and "I Knew I Loved You" on Domenica In, broadcast four days later. On 10 November 2007, she travelled to Germany and performed "Taking Chances" on Wetten, dass..?.

The promotional campaign in the United States began on 12 November 2007 with an episode of The Oprah Winfrey Show dedicated to Dion. She recorded the episode before her visit to the United Kingdom and performed "Taking Chances", "Alone", and several of her earlier hits, including "My Heart Will Go On", "Because You Loved Me", "A New Day Has Come", and "I Drove All Night". On 14 November 2007, Dion performed three songs on Today, including "Taking Chances", "Alone", and "I Drove All Night". On the same day, The Ellen DeGeneres Show aired an episode with Dion that included performances of "Taking Chances" and "Because You Loved Me". Dion also performed "Taking Chances" at the American Music Awards on 18 November 2007 and on All My Children on 21 November 2007. On 23 November 2007, she performed "Taking Chances", "Alone", and "Because You Loved Me" on The Early Show, and "Taking Chances" and "Alone" on The View. On 27 November 2007, Dion performed "Taking Chances" and "My Heart Will Go On" on the finale of Dancing with the Stars. The following day, she performed "Taking Chances", "Alone", and "The Christmas Song" at the Annual NYC Tree Lighting Ceremony. On 21 December 2007, two performances recorded during one of the final A New Day... concerts were broadcast on Larry King Live: "Taking Chances" and "The Christmas Song".

In late January 2008, Dion returned to France. On 25 January 2008, she appeared on the Star Academy finale and performed "Alone" and two of her French-language hits with the contestants. The following day, Dion performed "Taking Chances" at the NRJ Music Awards, where she received the NRJ Award of Honor. Before her second visit to France, Dion recorded the television special That's Just the Woman in Me for the United States and Canada, broadcast on 15 February 2008. She performed "Taking Chances", "Alone", an "Eyes on Me" remix with will.i.am, "That's Just the Woman in Me", and also "Something" with Joe Walsh on guitar, "The Power of Love", "River Deep, Mountain High", and "The Prayer" in a duet with Josh Groban. "The Prayer" was released as a digital download on 12 February 2008. On 14 February 2008, Dion began her Taking Chances World Tour, which visited Africa, Asia, Australia, Europe, and North America, and concluded on 26 February 2009. It grossed over US$279 million, making it at the time the third highest-grossing tour by a female artist, behind Madonna's Sticky & Sweet Tour and MDNA Tour. The tour was documented in the film Celine: Through the Eyes of the World, released on DVD and Blu-ray in April 2010. The concert itself was issued on DVD and CD as Taking Chances World Tour: The Concert and Tournée mondiale Taking Chances: Le spectacle.

== Critical response ==
Professional ratings
Aggregate scores
Source	Rating
Metacritic	53/100
Review scores
Source	Rating
About.com	3/5 stars
AllMusic	3/5 stars
Amazon.com	4/5 stars
Entertainment Weekly	C+
The Globe and Mail	3/5 stars
NOW	3/5 Ns
Rolling Stone	1/5 stars
Slant	2.5/5 stars
Toronto Star	3/4 stars
USA Today	3/4 stars

Taking Chances received mixed reviews from music critics. At Metacritic, the album received a weighted average score of 53 out of 100 based on eight reviews, indicating "mixed or average reviews." The album's attempts to broaden Dion's established sound received praise from several critics. Chuck Taylor of Billboard described it as a fresh direction, highlighting its grittier sound and more emotionally direct vocals, while Edna Gundersen of USA Today wrote that Dion was "stretching artistic muscles" and "seeking an escape from expectations." Ashante Infantry of the Toronto Star similarly praised its "darker, grittier vibe" and "edgier rock sound," suggesting that the changes could attract new listeners without alienating longtime fans. Bill Lamb of About.com welcomed the attempt to explore new musical directions and praised Dion's vocal ability, while Chris Willman of Entertainment Weekly noted the more youthful quality of her vocals and her willingness to move beyond her established easy-listening style.

Other reviewers regarded the album as a partial rather than convincing reinvention. Stephen Thomas Erlewine of AllMusic described its experiments with electronic pop, rock and blues as modest changes that ultimately left it sounding like "the same old Celine Dion" in a more contemporary setting. Sarah Rodman of The Boston Globe similarly argued that Dion took "few genuine risks", although she praised her precise vocals and the record's strong melodies. Kelefa Sanneh of The New York Times praised Dion's confidence and willingness to reconnect with contemporary pop, but found some of the stylistic experiments unsuccessful. Joey Guerra of the Houston Chronicle wrote that Dion "does indeed take a few chances"," praising the contemporary production and variety while finding some of the bolder experiments less convincing. The album also drew criticism for its polished production, conventional songwriting and attempts at stylistic reinvention. Sal Cinquemani ofSlant Magazine viewed the modernization as calculated, praising a "welcome grittiness" in parts of the album but criticizing some of its more conspicuous experiments. NOW argued that, despite its title, the album was largely conservative and sounded dated, with polished arrangements that could have appeared in the mid-1990s.

== Commercial performance ==
Two months before its official worldwide release, Taking Chances was among the most pre-ordered albums on Amazon. According to the IFPI, it was the eight best-selling album by a female artist worldwide in 2007, with sales of over 3.1 million copies that year.

=== Canada ===
In Canada, Taking Chances debuted at number one with 80,000 copies sold, surpassing Dion's own record for the biggest debut of 2007 (her French-language album D'elles sold 72,000 units in its first week in May 2007). Achieving two of the highest sales debuts in Canada for two different albums in one year gave Dion an unprecedented milestone in Canadian Nielsen SoundScan history. In its second week, the album remained at number one with 44,000 copies sold. It then fell to number two, staying there for four consecutive weeks with sales of 39,000, 45,000, 37,000, and 43,000 units, respectively. Dion returned to number one for the final week of 2007, selling another 13,000 copies. With 301,000 units sold in 2007, Taking Chances became the third best-selling album of the year in Canada according to Nielsen SoundScan. The album spent two additional weeks inside the top 10. In July 2008, it was certified four times platinum by the CRIA for shipments exceeding 400,000 copies. It also finished as the number-one album on the 2008 Canadian year-end Billboard chart.

=== United States ===
In the United States, Taking Chances debuted at number three with 215,000 copies sold. It then fell to number eight, remaining there for two weeks with sales of 128,000 and 93,000 copies. For the next four weeks, the album remained inside the top 20 on the Billboard 200, selling 84,000 (number 12), 92,000 (number 15), 134,000 (number 18), and 50,000 units (number 20). Taking Chances was certified platinum by the RIAA in February 2008 and has sold 1.1 million copies in the US as of May 2010.

=== Other markets ===
The album reached number one in Switzerland, South Africa, and on the European Top 100 Albums, and peaked inside the top 10 in numerous other countries. It received gold certifications in several markets, and platinum or multi-platinum awards in others. According to the IFPI, Taking Chances sold 3.1 million copies worldwide in 2007 alone.

== Accolades ==
In 2008, Dion won the World Music Award for World's Best Selling Canadian Artist of the Year. At the Juno Awards of 2008, she was nominated in six categories, including Album of the Year (Taking Chances), Pop Album of the Year (Taking Chances), Artist of the Year, and the Fan Choice Award. At the Juno Awards of 2009, Dion received three nominations, including Single of the Year for "Taking Chances" and the Fan Choice Award.

== Track listing ==
Standard edition
No.	Title	Writer(s)	Producer(s)	Length
1.	"Taking Chances"	Kara DioGuardi; Dave Stewart	John Shanks	4:02
2.	"Alone"	Billy Steinberg; Tom Kelly	Ben Moody	3:23
3.	"Eyes on Me"	Kristian Lundin; Savan Kotecha; Delta Goodrem	Lundin	3:54
4.	"My Love"	Linda Perry	Perry	4:09
5.	"Shadow of Love"	Anders Bagge; Aldo Nova; Peter Sjöström	Shanks	4:10
6.	"Surprise Surprise"	DioGuardi; Martin Harrington; Ash Howes	Emanuel Kiriakou; DioGuardi	5:13
7.	"This Time"	David Hodges; Moody; Steven McMorran	Moody; Hodges	3:46
8.	"New Dawn"	Perry	Perry	4:45
9.	"A Song for You"	Bagge; Nova; Robert Wells	Bagge	3:26
10.	"A World to Believe In"	Tino Izzo; Rosanna Ciciola	Shanks	4:08
11.	"Can't Fight the Feelin'"	Nova	Shanks; Nova	3:51
12.	"I Got Nothin' Left"	Shaffer Smith; Charles Harmony	Chuck Harmony; Ne-Yo^{[a]}	4:19
13.	"Right Next to the Right One"	Tim Christensen	Christopher Neil	4:10
14.	"Fade Away"	Peer Åström; David Stenmarck; Nova	Åström	3:16
15.	"That's Just the Woman in Me"	Kimberley Rew	Shanks	4:33
16.	"Skies of L.A."	Christopher Stewart; Terius Nash; Thaddis Harrell	Tricky Stewart; Kuk Harrell^{[b]}	4:23
Total length:				65:28

Digital deluxe edition
No.	Title	Writer(s)	Producer(s)	Length
17.	"Map to My Heart"	Guy Roche; Shelly Peiken	Roche	4:15
18.	"Taking Chances" (i-Soul extended remix)	DioGuardi; D. A. Stewart	Shanks; i-Soul^{[c]}	7:33
Total length:				77:16

Japanese edition
No.	Title	Writer(s)	Producer(s)	Length
18.	"The Reason I Go On"	Christian Leuzzi; Nova; Anders Borgius	Moody	3:42
Total length:				73:25

=== Notes ===
- ^{^a} signifies a co-producer
- ^{^b} signifies a vocal producer
- ^{^c} signifies a remixer
- The physical deluxe edition includes a bonus DVD with a preview of Live in Las Vegas: A New Day... and four songs from the show.
- The US Walmart edition includes a bonus DVD with the recording sessions for six songs from Taking Chances.
- The French digital deluxe edition also includes "Immensité".

== Charts ==
=== Weekly charts ===
Weekly chart performance
Chart (2007–2008)	Peak position
Australian Albums (ARIA)	12
Austrian Albums (Ö3 Austria)	3
Belgian Albums (Ultratop Flanders)	7
Belgian Albums (Ultratop Wallonia)	3
Canadian Albums (Billboard)	1
Croatian International Albums (HDU)	8
Czech Albums (ČNS IFPI)	17
Danish Albums (Hitlisten)	2
Dutch Albums (Album Top 100)	4
European Albums (Billboard)	1
Finnish Albums (Suomen virallinen lista)	13
French Albums (SNEP)	2
German Albums (Offizielle Top 100)	5
Greek Foreign Albums (IFPI)	2
Hungarian Albums (MAHASZ)	12
Irish Albums (IRMA)	6
Italian Albums (FIMI)	5
Japanese Albums (Oricon)	6
Japanese International Albums (Oricon)	2
Mexican Albums (Top 100 Mexico)	40
New Zealand Albums (RMNZ)	4
Norwegian Albums (VG-lista)	7
Polish Albums (ZPAV)	21
Portuguese Albums (AFP)	9
Quebec (ADISQ)	1
Scottish Albums (Official Charts)	4
South African Albums (RISA)	1
Spanish Albums (Promusicae)	8
Swedish Albums (Sverigetopplistan)	8
Swiss Albums (Schweizer Hitparade)	1
UK Albums (Official Charts)	5
US Billboard 200	3

=== Monthly charts ===
Monthly chart performance
Chart (2007)	Peak position
South Korean Albums (RIAK)	7

=== Year-end charts ===
2007 year-end chart performance
Chart (2007)	Position
Australian Albums (ARIA)	71
Belgian Albums (Ultratop Flanders)	98
Belgian Albums (Ultratop Wallonia)	51
Canadian Albums (SoundScan)	3
Danish Albums (Hitlisten)	31
Dutch Albums (Album Top 100)	45
Finnish Foreign Albums (Suomen virallinen lista)	16
French Albums (SNEP)	52
Italian Albums (FIMI)	70
Norwegian Christmas Period Albums (VG-lista)	15
Swedish Albums (Sverigetopplistan)	72
Swiss Albums (Schweizer Hitparade)	26
UK Albums (OCC)	52
Worldwide Albums (IFPI)	19

2008 year-end chart performance
Chart (2008)	Position
Belgian Albums (Ultratop Flanders)	45
Belgian Albums (Ultratop Wallonia)	42
Canadian Albums (Billboard)	1
Croatian Foreign Albums (IFPI)	33
Danish Albums (Hitlisten)	76
Dutch Albums (Album Top 100)	98
European Albums (Billboard)	35
Swiss Albums (Schweizer Hitparade)	76
US Billboard 200	34

=== All-time charts ===
All-time chart performance
Chart	Position
Canadian Artists Albums (SoundScan)	43

== Certifications and sales ==
Certifications
Region	Certification	Certified units/sales
Australia (ARIA)	Platinum	70,000^{^}
Austria (IFPI Austria)	Gold	10,000^{*}
Belgium (BRMA)	Gold	15,000^{*}
Canada (Music Canada)	4× Platinum	400,000^{^}
Denmark (IFPI Danmark)	Platinum	30,000^{^}
Finland	—	11,516
France (SNEP)	Gold	150,000
Germany (BVMI)	Gold	100,000^{‡}
Hungary (MAHASZ)	Gold	3,000^{^}
Ireland (IRMA)	2× Platinum	30,000^{^}
Italy sales 2007	—	100,000
Japan (RIAJ)	Gold	100,000^{^}
Netherlands (NVPI)	Gold	35,000^{^}
New Zealand (RMNZ)	Gold	7,500^{^}
Poland (ZPAV)	Gold	10,000^{*}
Russia (NFPF)	Gold	10,000^{*}
Singapore (RIAS)	Gold	8,000
South Africa (RiSA)	2× Platinum	100,000
South Korea	—	3,199
Spain (Promusicae)	Gold	40,000^{^}
Sweden (GLF)	Gold	20,000^{^}
Switzerland (IFPI Switzerland)	Platinum	30,000^{^}
United Kingdom (BPI)	Platinum	392,998
United States (RIAA)	Platinum	1,100,000
Summaries
Worldwide	—	3,100,000
^{*} Sales figures based on certification alone.^{^} Shipments figures based on certification alone.^{‡} Sales+streaming figures based on certification alone.

== Release history ==
Release history
Region	Date	Label	Format	Catalog
Japan	7 November 2007	SMEJ	CD	EICP-875
Europe	9 November 2007	Columbia	CD	88697081142
Europe	9 November 2007	Columbia	CD/DVD	88697147842
Australia	10 November 2007	Epic	CD	88697081142
Australia	10 November 2007	Epic	CD/DVD	88697147842
United States	13 November 2007	Columbia	CD	88697081142
United States	13 November 2007	Columbia	CD/DVD	88697147842
United States	11 December 2007	Columbia	CD/DVD/Perfume	88697147862
Canada	13 November 2007	Columbia	CD	88697081142
Canada	13 November 2007	Columbia	CD/DVD	88697147842
Canada	11 December 2007	Columbia	CD/DVD/Perfume	88697147862
Europe	8 February 2008	Columbia	CD/DVD/Perfume	88697147862

== See also ==
- List of European number-one hits of 2007
- List of number-one albums of 2007 (Canada)
- List of number-one albums of 2008 (Canada)
