= J'ai un problème =

1973 single by Sylvie Vartan and Johnny Hallyday

Single by Sylvie & Johnny

from the album Untitled (J'ai un problème)
- Language: French
- English title: I have a problem
- Released: June 1973
- Recorded: April 1973
- Studio: Olympic Studios, London; Studio Ferber, Paris
- Genre: Pop
- Length: 2:59
- Label: Philips, RCA
- Songwriters: Jean Renard and Michel Mallory

Sylvie Vartan singles chronology
"La vie c’est du cinéma" (1973)	"J'ai un problème" (1973)	"L’homme que tu seras" (1973)

Johnny Hallyday singles chronology
"Le soleil se lève à l'est" (1973)	"J'ai un problème" (1973)	"Le Feu" (1973)

Music video
- "J'ai un problème" "J'ai un problème" (French TV, 1973) on YouTube

"J'ai un problème" ("I have a problem") is a French language song, a duet by then-married couple Sylvie Vartan and Johnny Hallyday. The single cover credited the duo as "Sylvie & Johnny".

== The single ==
The song appears on an album of Vartan's that remains untitled, but is commonly known as the J'ai un problème album because of the appearance of the song as the first title track on the album.

"J'ai un problème" is written and composed by Jean Renard and Michel Mallory. The musical direction for the song was done by Gabriel Yared. the song was a huge hit in France staying at the top of the French Singles Chart for seven weeks during July and August 1973. making it one of the biggest successes of Sylvie Vartan, wife of Hallyday. The song was a success on many international charts as well and translated to a number of languages, most notably German and Italian.

== Track list ==
- Side A: "J'ai un problème"
- Side B: "Te tuer d'amour"

=== Charts ===
Charts (1973)	Peak position
French Singles Chart	1

== Other versions ==
=== Language versions ===
In Autumn 1974, Vartan and Hallyday recorded a German version in Paris as "Vielleicht bist du für mich noch nicht die große Liebe"; (English: "Maybe you're not my true love yet", French: "Peut-être que tu n'es pas encore mon véritable amour", Italian: "Forse non sei ancora il mio vero amore") It was released as the B-side of their 45 rpm single that included "Te tuer d'amour" as side A. In 1975, Wess and Dori Ghezzi released a cover of the Italian version "Il mio problema" as a double A side 45 rpm single alongside "Voglio tutto di te" that became a #1 hit on the Italian Singles Chart during May 1975
