= Taking Chances (song) =

2007 single by Celine Dion

Single by Celine Dion

from the album Taking Chances
- B-side: "Map to My Heart"
- Released: 18 September 2007
- Recorded: 2007
- Studio: Henson Recording (Los Angeles); Studio at the Palms (Paradise); The Studio (Philadelphia)
- Genre: Pop; soft rock
- Length: 4:02
- Label: Columbia; Epic
- Songwriters: Kara DioGuardi; Dave Stewart
- Producer: John Shanks

Celine Dion singles chronology
"Immensité" (2007)	"Taking Chances" (2007)	"Eyes on Me" (2008)

Music video
- "Taking Chances" on YouTube

"Taking Chances" is a song recorded by Canadian singer Celine Dion for her tenth English-language studio album, Taking Chances (2007). It was written by Kara DioGuardi and former Eurythmics member Dave Stewart for their band Platinum Weird. The track had originally been intended for release as a single in February 2007 from their unreleased self-titled album. After completing the recording, DioGuardi and Stewart played the song for Dion's husband, René Angélil, whose positive reaction led Dion to record her own version.

Issued as the album's lead single on 18 September 2007, "Taking Chances" is a pop ballad with a soft rock finish. Its lyrics focus on trust, emotional openness, and the willingness to pursue a meaningful connection. The line "So talk to me, like lovers do" is drawn from the Eurythmics song "Here Comes the Rain Again". Critics responded positively, noting Dion's readiness to explore new material and describing the track as hopeful and heartfelt.

"Taking Chances" achieved commercial success in several countries, reaching the top 10 in Belgium, Canada, Denmark, France, Italy, and Switzerland. It peaked at number 40 on the UK Singles Chart and number 54 on the Billboard Hot 100, and it topped the Hot Dance Club Play chart. The song was nominated for Single of the Year at the Juno Awards of 2009. It was later covered on Fox's TV series Glee by Lea Michele as Rachel Berry, and her version reached number 71 on the Billboard Hot 100.

== Background and writing ==
"Taking Chances" was written by songwriter Kara DioGuardi and former Eurythmics member Dave Stewart. The collaboration began when record label manager Jimmy Iovine paired them to write material for the Pussycat Dolls, but the sessions quickly shifted direction as both writers realised that the songs they were developing reflected their own creative chemistry rather than the brief. Iovine supported the change and signed them to Interscope Records, where they recorded an album as Platinum Weird, released in 2006. In The Dave Stewart Songbook Vol. 1, Stewart recalls that the pair wrote "Taking Chances" in roughly 10 minutes while movers were carrying furniture into DioGuardi's new Los Angeles home.

Stewart later described the session as spontaneous and unusually chaotic. Hearing windchimes outside an open window, he began echoing their uneven rhythm on an acoustic guitar, prompting DioGuardi to improvise melodies and fragments of lyrics while directing the movers. The atmosphere, though disordered, pushed them into a rapid exchange of musical and lyrical ideas, shaping the song almost in real time. Stewart said the lyrics captured their willingness to trust an unexpected partnership and to follow an instinctive creative impulse.

After completing the demo, DioGuardi and Stewart played it for Dion's husband René, whose enthusiastic reaction encouraged Dion to record it. She released "Taking Chances" as the title track and lead single from her tenth English studio album, which also provided the name for her World Tour. The recording was produced by John Shanks, who also produced five additional tracks on the album. DioGuardi contributed further to the project by writing and co-producing, with Emanuel Kiriakou, the song "Surprise Surprise". She had previously written several songs for Dion, including "One Heart", co-written and co-produced with Shanks and released as a single in 2003.

On 9 September 2007, members of Dion's fan club received a 24-hour advance preview of "Taking Chances" and its in-studio video. The clip became available through Amazon.com and the Sympatico / MSN Music Store the following day. The song premiered on radio on 10 September 2007 and was released as a music download on 29 October 2007 in the United States and Europe. The track was later included on her 2008 greatest hits My Love: Essential Collection. A live version appears on the Taking Chances World Tour: The Concert CD/DVD.

== Composition ==
"Taking Chances" (2007)
A 30 second sample of "Taking Chances".

"Taking Chances" is a pop song that opens with an acoustic guitar before expanding into a fuller pop/rock arrangement. Dion's vocals span from E3 to F♯5. The line "So talk to me, like lovers do" is taken from the Eurythmics song "Here Comes the Rain Again".

In an interview, Dave Stewart explained that he reused the lyric because the song reflected his collaboration with Kara DioGuardi and their decision to pursue a creative partnership. He described the writing process as one that gradually intensified, mirroring the song's own build from a sparse opening to a more forceful arrangement. Stewart added that the shift into the line "So talk to me, talk to me like lovers do" served as a deliberate nod to his earlier work.

== Critical reception ==
"Taking Chances" received positive reviews from music critics. Bill Lamb of About.com praised Dion's "commanding and powerful" vocal performance, noting that the track "opens the album and announces new directions in a truly exciting fashion," even if he considered the remainder of the album less consistent.

Chuck Taylor of Billboard described the single as "destined for AC's top 10", while Sarah Rodman of The Boston Globe wrote that the song "builds from an acoustic strum into the kind of pleasant radio-ready crunch that Michelle Branch would recognize".

Tammy La Gorce of Amazon.com described the recording as a "hopeful, heartfelt track" that evolves into an anthemic power ballad. Nick Levine of Digital Spy wrote that the song "begins in surprisingly restrained fashion" before shifting into "soft rock bombast," with guitars that "surge tastefully" and drums reminiscent of a Phil Collins solo record.

Lamb later placed "Taking Chances" on his list of the Top 20 Pop Songs of 2007, remarking that Dion "moves into slightly more rocking territory in highly tasteful fashion" and suggesting that the track might encourage some listeners to reconsider her catalogue.

Stephen Thomas Erlewine of AllMusic singled out the song in his review. Edna Gundersen of USA Today wrote that Dion "dials back the bombast on the title track, a midtempo rocker". Gundersen and Chris Willman of Entertainment Weekly also included the song on their "Download this" lists.

== Commercial performance ==
In Canada, "Taking Chances" debuted at number 82 on the Canadian Hot 100 chart dated 29 September 2007. The single made a strong move the following week, becoming the "Greatest Gainer" as it rose from number 82 to number 13 on the chart dated 6 October 2007. It then slipped to number 30 in its third week, edged up to number 29, and reached number 26 in its fifth week. After several weeks of fluctuation, the song climbed to number 10 in its 10th week, dated 1 December 2007, and peaked at number nine the following week. It was certified gold for over 20,000 digital downloads.

"Taking Chances" debuted at number 54 on the Billboard Hot 100 chart dated 1 December 2007, earning the week's "Highest Debut". It fell to number 68 the following week, remained at number 68 one week later, and dropped to number 88 on the chart dated 22 December 2007. It spent four weeks on the Hot 100. As of 8 April 2012, the digital single had sold 498,000 copies in the US, making it Dion's third best‑selling digital track. The single also topped the US Hot Dance Club Play chart, becoming Dion's second number one after "Misled" in 1994. It peaked at number six on the US Hot Adult Contemporary Tracks, giving Dion a record 21 top 10 entries at the format over two decades.

In the United Kingdom, the song debuted at number 58 on the UK Singles Chart on 10 November 2007 and peaked at number 40 one week later. It spent four weeks on the chart. In France, the song debuted and peaked at number seven on the SNEP chart. It remained on the chart for 22 consecutive weeks before dropping to number 91 on 5 April 2008. It later re‑entered at number 88 on 10 January 2009, spending two more weeks, reappeared at number 94 on 4 April 2009 for another two weeks, and re‑entered again at number 85 on 20 June 2009, staying for three weeks. In total, it spent 29 non‑consecutive weeks on the French chart.

In Italy, the song debuted and peaked at number five on the FIMI chart on 1 November 2007. It fell to number eight the following week, fluctuated for several weeks, and reached number nine on 22 December 2007. In Denmark, the song debuted and peaked at number 29 on the Danish Singles Chart on 23 November 2007. It dropped to number 31 the following week, but re‑entered at number three on 13 June 2008, becoming its peak position. In Austria, the song debuted at number 43 on the Ö3 Austria Top 40 chart on 9 November 2007 and rose to number 35 the following week. It peaked at number 12 in its third week and held that position for a second week. It spent 14 weeks on the chart.

== Music video ==
Celine Dion in the music video for "Taking Chances".

The music video for "Taking Chances" was directed by Paul Boyd and filmed over three days, from 15 to 17 September 2007, at various locations across the Las Vegas Valley. It premiered on 16 October 2007. The video follows Dion as she breaks into a hotel room and is pursued through the building. It also features a cameo by songwriter Dave Stewart, who appears as an enigmatic, boss-like figure reminiscent of a James Bond antagonist. Stewart later recalled that temperatures during filming reached about 100 °F.

The narrative shows Dion arriving in Las Vegas for her show, only to notice a mysterious motorcyclist who moves through the city and eventually enters what appears to be her hotel suite. As the story unfolds, the figure mirrors her movements and gradually assumes her identity. The final scene reveals that the motorcyclist is Dion herself, removing the helmet to complete the transformation.

== Promotion ==
On 27 October 2007, Dion appeared on the fourth series of the British talent contest The X Factor as a mentor to the contestants. She also performed "Taking Chances" on the live show, marking the world-exclusive debut of the song and her first UK performance in five years. On 12 November 2007, Dion appeared on The Oprah Winfrey Show, where she performed the song and took requests from Oprah's audience. Two days later, on 14 November 2007, she performed the track on The Ellen DeGeneres Show.

On 17 November 2007, Dion performed the song on the Thanksgiving episode of All My Children. The following day, she delivered a live performance at the American Music Awards in Los Angeles. On 23 November 2007, Dion performed "Taking Chances" and "Alone" on the American talk show The View. On 27 November 2007, she performed the track on ABC's dance competition series Dancing with the Stars. "Taking Chances" was also included in the set list of the Taking Chances World Tour. Dion also performed the song during her 2017 European tour.

== Usage in popular culture and covers ==
"Taking Chances" was used as theme music for promotional trailers for the CBS series Moonlight. It was later used in 2009 on So You Think You Can Dance Canada during the Top 20 performance show in a routine choreographed by Stacey Tookey.

The song was also covered on Fox's TV series Glee by Lea Michele as Rachel Berry in the episode "Preggers" from the first season. Her version reached number 71 on the Billboard Hot 100.

== Accolades ==
"Taking Chances" received industry recognition in Canada, earning a nomination for Single of the Year at the Juno Awards of 2009.

== Formats and track listing ==
- European CD and digital single
1. "Taking Chances" – 4:02
2. "Map to My Heart" – 4:15
- Japanese CD single
1. "Taking Chances" – 4:02
2. "To Love You More" (radio edit) – 4:39
- Australian and European CD and digital maxi-single
1. "Taking Chances" – 4:02
2. "Map to My Heart" – 4:15
3. "Taking Chances" (I-Soul extended remix) – 7:33
4. "Taking Chances" (in-studio video) – 4:11 (CD only)
- French CD and digital single
1. "Taking Chances" – 4:02
2. "Immensité" – 3:34
3. "Map to My Heart" – 4:15
4. "Taking Chances" (I-Soul extended remix) – 7:33 (digital only)
- French CD maxi-single
1. "Taking Chances" – 4:02
2. "Immensité" – 3:34
3. "Map to My Heart" – 4:15
4. "Taking Chances" (I-Soul extended remix) – 7:33
5. "Taking Chances" (in-studio video) – 4:11

== Remixes ==
1. "Taking Chances" (I-Soul radio edit) – 3:57
2. "Taking Chances" (I-Soul extended remix) – 7:33
3. "Taking Chances" (Jason Nevins remix) – 3:43
4. "Taking Chances" (Jason Nevins extended mix) – 6:24
5. "Taking Chances" (Matt Piso radio edit) – 4:53
6. "Taking Chances" (Matt Piso club mix) – 7:16
7. "Taking Chances" (Ralphi Rosario & Craig J. radio edit) – 3:44
8. "Taking Chances" (Ralphi Rosario & Craig J. full vocal radio edit) – 4:11
9. "Taking Chances" (Ralphi Rosario & Craig J. vocal mix) – 9:02
10. "Taking Chances" (Ralphi Rosario & Craig J. thick dub) – 8:07

== Credits and personnel ==
Recording locations

- Henson Recording Studio (Los Angeles)
- Studio at the Palms (Paradise)
- The Studio (Philadelphia)

Personnel

- Kara DioGuardi – songwriting, backing vocals
- Dave Stewart – songwriting
- John Shanks – production, guitars, bass
- Jeff Rothschild – drums, programming, mixing
- Ned Douglas – keyboards

Credits adapted from the liner notes of Taking Chances, Epic Records.

== Charts ==
=== Weekly charts ===
Weekly chart performance
Chart (2007–2008)	Peak position
Australia (ARIA)	60
Austria (Ö3 Austria Top 40)	12
Belgium (Ultratip Bubbling Under Flanders)	4
Belgium (Ultratop 50 Wallonia)	29
Canada Hot 100 (Billboard)	9
Canada AC (Billboard)	1
Canada Hot AC (Billboard)	38
Czech Republic Airplay (ČNS IFPI)	68
Denmark (Tracklisten)	3
Europe (European Hot 100 Singles)	12
France (SNEP)	7
Germany (GfK)	25
Ireland (IRMA)	32
Italy (FIMI)	5
Japan (Japan Hot 100)	25
Netherlands (Dutch Top 40 Tipparade)	12
Netherlands (Single Top 100)	100
Norway (VG-lista)	16
Romania (Romanian Top 100)	79
Quebec Radio Songs (ADISQ)	1
Slovakia Airplay (ČNS IFPI)	43
Spain (PROMUSICAE Airplay)	12
Sweden (Sverigetopplistan)	43
Switzerland (Schweizer Hitparade)	5
UK Singles (OCC)	40
US Billboard Hot 100	54
US Adult Contemporary (Billboard)	6
US Adult Pop Airplay (Billboard)	36
US Dance Club Songs (Billboard)	1
US Pop 100 (Billboard)	35
World Global Dance Songs (Billboard)	30

=== Year-end charts ===
2007 year-end chart performance
Chart (2007)	Position
Switzerland (Schweizer Hitparade)	79

2008 year-end chart performance
Chart (2008)	Position
Canada (Canadian Hot 100)	90
Canada AC (Billboard)	13
US Adult Contemporary (Billboard)	24
US Hot Dance Club Songs (Billboard)	30

== Certifications and sales ==
Certifications
Region	Certification	Certified units/sales
Canada (Music Canada) digital	Gold	20,000^{*}
Canada (Music Canada)	Gold	40,000^{‡}
United States	—	498,000
^{*} Sales figures based on certification alone.^{‡} Sales+streaming figures based on certification alone.

== Release history ==
Release history
Region	Date	Format	Label	Ref.
United States	18 September 2007	Digital download	Epic	
Japan	24 October 2007	CD	SMEJ	
United Kingdom	29 October 2007	Digital download	Epic	
