= Françoise Dorin =

French actor, comedian, novelist, playwright and songwriter

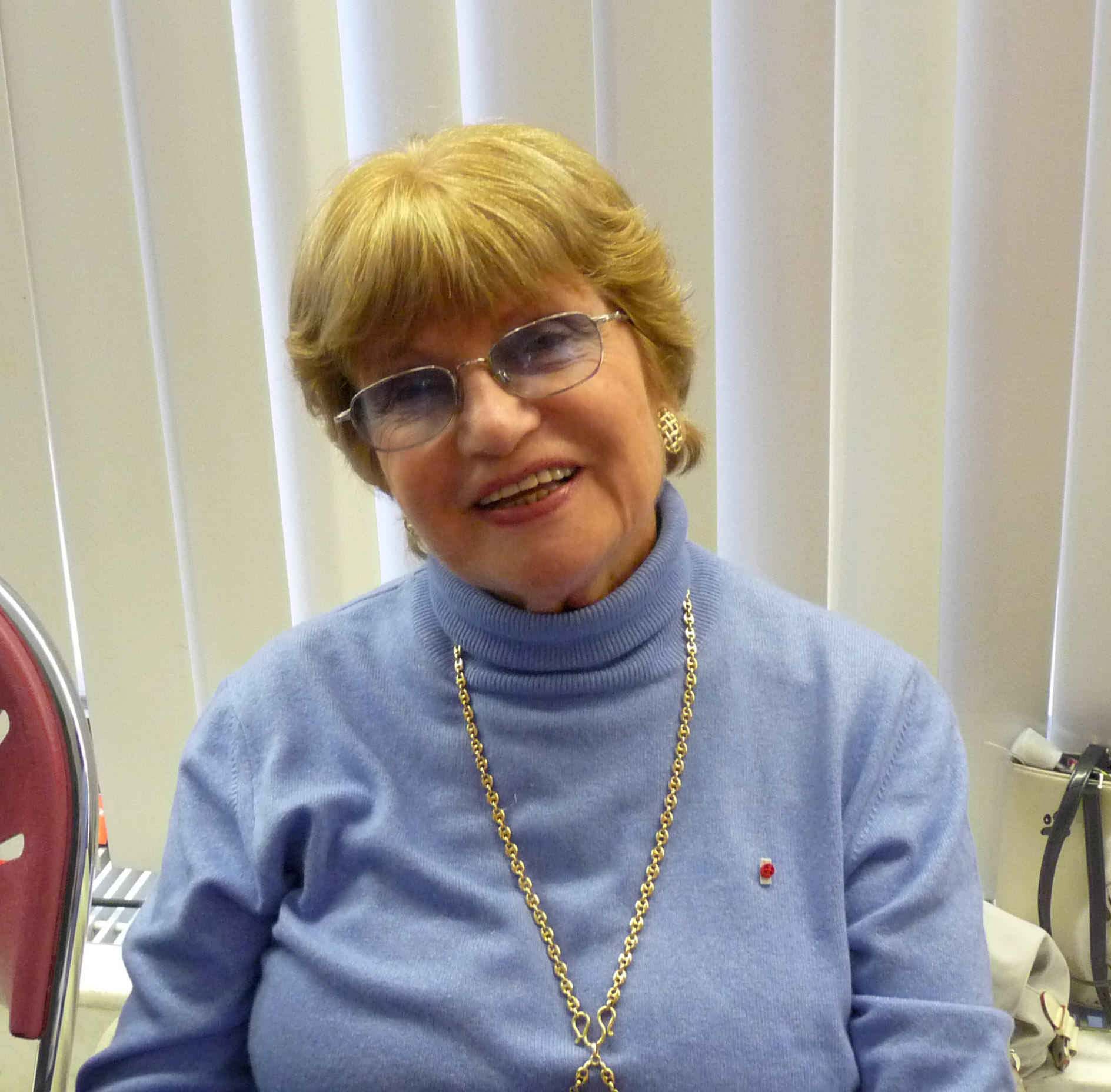
- Born: 23 January 1928; Paris, France
- Died: 12 January 2018 (aged 89); Courbevoie, Hauts-de-Seine, France
- Education: Cours Hattemer
- Occupations: Actor; Comedian; Novelist; Playwright; Songwriter
- Spouses: Jean Poiret (m. 1958, divorced) Jean Piat (m. 1975)
- Children: 1
- Awards: Commandeur of the Légion d'honneur; Officier of the Ordre des Arts et des Lettres; Grand officier de l’ordre national du Mérite

Françoise Andrée Renée Dorin (French pronunciation: [fʁɑ̃swaz ɑ̃dʁe ʁəne dɔʁɛ̃]; 23 January 1928 – 12 January 2018) was a French actor, comedian, novelist, playwright and songwriter. She was most successful in the 1970s, authored about 30 plays and more than 25 books as well as writing songs for various artists. Dorin wrote the song N'avoue jamais which was performed by Guy Mardel on behalf of France at the Eurovision Song Contest 1965. She was appointed Commandeur of the Légion d'honneur, the Officier of the Ordre des Arts et des Lettres and the Grand officier de l’ordre national du Mérite. A street in Paris' 17th arrondissement was voted unanimously by the Council of Paris to be named after Dorin following her death.

== Personal background ==
Dorin was born in the 17th arrondissement of Paris, on 23 January 1928. She was the daughter of the songwriter René Dorin, and his wife Yvonne Guilbert. Dorin had one brother. Dorin's great-grandmother was a coffee market store owner and this was taken over by her maternal grandfather Athanase Guilbert. She was educated at Cours Hattemer. Dorin was married on 2 October 1958 and later divorced to the actor Jean Poiret and the two had a daughter. She was later remarried to the actor and writer Jean Piat from 1975 to 2018. On the morning of 12 January 2018, Dorin died at l'hôpital de Courbevoie in Hauts-de-Seine.

== Career ==
She made her stage debut at the cinéma-théâtre d'Yvetot in 1946 but she was uncomfortable on stage. After training opposite Roger Hanin and Michel Piccoli for a period of four years as well as working for her father at Théâtre des Deux Ânes for three years when he introduced her to classical literature, her debut doing songwriter reviews came at a production of Aveux les plus doux in 1957 at the Théâtre des Deux-Anes. The following year, Dorin reviewed le Chinois at Théâtre La Bruyère. She wrote the song N'avoue jamais that was performed by Guy Mardel who was France's representative at the Eurovision Song Contest 1965. Dorin authored her first play Comme au théâtre in 1967 under a pseudonym, then proceeded to write La Invoice the year after, and she presented the television programme Paris Club that was broadcast in 1969.

During the 1970s, she authored Un sale égoïste, Les Bonshommes that same year, Vos gueules les mouettes in 1971, l’Age en question in 1972, the musical Monsieur Pompadour in the same year, Le Tournant (The Turning Point) in 1973, the two-act comedy Le Tube in 1975, l'Autre Valse in 1976, Si t'es beau, t'es con in 1976 and Le Tout pour le tout in 1978. This made Dorin one of the most performed authors in France in the 1970s and was most successful during this period. In 1980, she wrote les Lits à une place that sold more than a million copies and l’Intoxe which sold out every evening in Paris. Dorin went on to author les Miroirs truqués in 1982, the three-act l’Etiquette play in 1983, les Jupes-culottes in 1984, la Valise en carton in 1986, Les Cahiers Tango in 1987, les Corbeaux et les renardes in 1988, and was a dialogue writer for the film A deux minutes près in 1989.

Over the course of the following decade, she authored Nini patte-en-l'air in 1990, Et s'il n'en restait qu'une and Que c'est triste Venise, N'avoue jamais, Faisons l’humour ensemble, Et s'il n'en restait qu'une both in 1992, Pique et cœur and Retour en Touraine each in 1993, La Mouflette in 1994, the vaudeville Monsieur de Saint-Futile two years later, les Vendanges tardives and the anthology Les Plus belles scènes d'amour in 1997 and the Courte paille in 1999. During the 2000s, Dorin wrote the Julottes and Soins intensifs in 2001, La Rêve-party in 2002, Tout est toujours possible in 2004, Et puis après... in 2005, le Cœur à deux places in 2006, En avant toutes! in 2007, Quand les mouettes nous volent dans les plumes with Jean Piat in 2008 and Les Lettres que je n'ai pas envoyées in 2009. She then authored Vous avez quel âge? in 2010 and Ensemble et séparément four years later.

Dorin retired a few years before her death. She had written songs for Charles Aznavour, Michel Legrand, Régine to Claude François, from Dalida to Mireille Mathieu, Juliette Gréco, Line Renaud, Patachou and Celine Dion. Dorin was one of the first women to sit on the board of directors of the Société des Auteurs et Compositeurs Dramatiques.

== Analysis ==
Dorin's plays were performed more than a thousand times; she authored approximately thirty plays, and wrote more than twenty-five books. Dominique Labarrière, the journalist, described Dorin as having "a precious way of expressing herself" when on television that originated from her father. Armelle Héliot of Le Figaro wrote of Dorin that she "wants us to laugh until tears" and kept her sense of cabaret" even as "she unashamedly asserts basic truths, even if she cooks her books like a scrupulous cook, even if she is not afraid of the excesses of the heart, even if she admits wanting to please, we guess, beyond the pretty stories that she recounts – and which she sometimes repeats for her comedies – something of a dull melancholy". Héliot also noted Dorin "could go from a very happy tone to a gloomy mood".

== Awards and legacy ==
She won the Trophée Dussane in 1973, and was awarded the Grand Prix du Théâtre de la Société des Auteurs et Compositeurs Dramatiques for the play l’Etiquette in 1984, a prize she shared with Samuel Beckett. Dorin was made Commandeurs of the Légion d'honneur in 2008. She was also appointed Officier of the Ordre des Arts et des Lettres in 2000 and Grand officier de l’ordre national du Mérite in 2012. In February 2018, the Council of Paris unanimously voted to rename a street in the neighbourhood of ZAC Clichy-Batignolles, which is in the city's 17th arrondissement, after her in an attempt to create better gender parity by naming some of the city's streets after women.
