= The Voice of Germany season 1 =

The Voice of Germany
- Season 1
- Hosted by: Stefan Gödde; Doris Golpashin (V Reporter)
- Judges: Nena; Xavier Naidoo; Rea Garvey; The BossHoss
- Winner: Ivy Quainoo
- Winning coach: The BossHoss
- Runner-up: Kim Sanders

Release
- Original network: ProSieben and Sat.1
- Original release: November 24, 2011 – February 10, 2012

Season chronology
- Next → Season 2

The Voice of Germany (season 1) is a German reality talent show that premiered on 24 November 2011 on ProSieben and Sat.1. Based on the reality singing competition The Voice of Holland, the series was created by Dutch television producer John de Mol. It is part of an international series.

== Development, production and marketing ==
In April 2011, ProSieben announced its intention to bring an adaptation of The Voice of Holland to the Germany. In July 2011, ProSieben began announcements of the coaches/judges for the series. First to sign on were Nena and Xavier Naidoo. Rea Garvey and "Boss Burns" (Alec Völkel) & "Hoss Power" (Sascha Vollmer) came on board in late August 2011.

Stefan Gödde is the show's host. Doris Golpashin is hosting backstage special for the official website. Season 1 premiered on ProSieben on 24 November 2011. RTL took on a ratings fight when they programmed their successful talent show Das Supertalent against newcomer The Voice of Germany. While RTL could win the battle overall with 5.83 million viewers (18.1% market share) compared to The Voice of Germany's 3.89 million viewers (12.4% market share), the ProSieben show won among the target group 14–49 with 3.06 million viewers (23.8% market share) against Das Supertalent's 2.99 million viewers (22.8% market share). The following day, The Voice of Germany aired on Sat.1 for the first time.

On Sat.1, The Voice of Germany extended its viewers to 4.36 million viewers (14.3% market share) overall and in the target group 14-49 the viewers were almost the same with 3.05 million viewers (26.6% market share).

The show saw a significant drop in ratings during the live shows. The final was watched by 4.01 million viewers, a market share of 12.9%.

== The first phase: The Blind Auditions ==
The castings to the first season took place in June and July, 2011, however, were not shown on television. About 150 the singers – more than three-quarters of them with experience of the stage – were invited to the Blind Auditions. These were taped at the end of August and at the beginning of September, 2011 in Berlin and were emitted from 24 November to 9 December 2011 in six telecasts. The jury chose 64 candidates in the second phase, in the Nena and Rea Garvey with 16, The BossHoss with 15 and Xavier Naidoo with 17 candidates entered.

Key	Coach hit his or her "I WANT YOU" button	Contestant eliminated with no coach pressing his or her "I WANT YOU" button	Contestant defaulted to this coach's team	Contestant elected to join this coach's team

=== Episode 1: November 24, 2011 ===
Order	Contestant	Song	Coaches' and Contestants' Choices			
Order	Contestant	Song	Nena	Xavier Naidoo	Rea Garvey	The BossHoss
1	Dominic Sanz	"Use Somebody"	—			—
2	Nina Kutschera	"Set Fire to the Rain"		—		
3	Sebastian Deyle	"Ich Glaube"	—	—	—	—
4	Verena Putzer	"Just Hold Me"		—	—	—
5	Percival Duke	"Drops of Jupiter"	—	—		
6	Sarah Keller	"Torn"	—	—	—	—
7	Pamela Falcon	"Natural Woman"				
8	Vera Luttenberger	"Fuckin' Perfect"		—	—	
9	Orry Jackson	"DJ's Got Us Fallin' In Love"	—	—	—	—
10	Charles Simmons	"Love's Divine"				
11	Kim Loy	"All Summer Long"	—	—	—	—
12	Josef Prasil	"Hey There Delilah"				—
13	Sharron Levy	"Fallin'"		—	—	
14	Rino Galiano	"You Give Me Something"	—			

=== Episode 2: November 25, 2011 ===
Order	Contestant	Song	Coaches' and Contestants' Choices			
Order	Contestant	Song	Nena	Xavier Naidoo	Rea Garvey	The BossHoss
1	Ramona Nerra	"American Boy"	—	—	—	
2	Benny Martell	"Nur In Meinem Kopf"	—		—	
3	Lelia Berrada-Gouzi	"Russian Roulette"	—	—	—	—
4	Max Giesinger	"Sex On Fire"				
5	Pierre Humphrey	"Respect"	—	—	—	—
6	Giovanni Costello	"If You Don't Know Me By Now"	—		—	—
7	Alicia Emmi Berg	"California King Bed"		—	—	—
8	Josie-Claire Bürkle	"Love Story"	—	—	—	—
9	Achan Malonda	"Irgendwas Bleibt"	—	—	—	—
10	Mikey Cox	"Stand By Me"	—	—		—
11	Heiko Schmidt	"Nur Noch Kurz Die Welt Retten"	—			—
12	Butch Williams	"Crazy"	—			
13	Andy Hermes	"Hollywood Hills"	—	—	—	
14	Patricia Medeen	"Halo"			—	

=== Episode 3: December 1, 2011 ===
Order	Contestant	Song	Coaches' and Contestants' Choices			
Order	Contestant	Song	Nena	Xavier Naidoo	Rea Garvey	The BossHoss
1	Colin "C." Jay	"Crazy"	—			
2	Dilan Koshnaw	"A Night Like This"	—		—	—
3	Marc Barthel	"Grenade"	—	—	—	—
4	Kim Sanders	"You Gotta Be"				
5	Rüdiger Skoczowsky	"Roxanne"	—		—	—
6	Laura Martin	"Heavy Cross"	—		—	—
7	Jean Pierre Derinbay	"Just The Way You Are"	—	—	—	—
8	Behnam Moghaddam	"Wicked Game"		—	—	—
9	Markus Nendse	"Halt Dich An Mir Fest"	—	—	—	—
10	Shari Fanio	"Mercy"		—	—	
11	Arcangelo Vigneri	"I'm Yours"		—		—
12	Vini Gomez	"Chasing Cars"			—	—
13	Sabrina Ziegler	"Wort"	—	—	—	—
14	Lise Martine Weller	"Use Somebody"		—	—	—
15	Mic Donet	"Apologize"				

=== Episode 4: December 2, 2011 ===
Order	Contestant	Song	Coaches' and Contestants' Choices			
Order	Contestant	Song	Nena	Xavier Naidoo	Rea Garvey	The BossHoss
1	Yasmina Hunziger	"Listen"		—	—	
2	Bulge Bolat	"Russian Roulette"	—	—	—	—
3	Benny Fiedler	"Forget You"	—	—		—
4	Katja Friedenberg	"Just Hold Me"	—		—	
5	Raffa Shira Banggard	"Bilder Von Dir"	—	—	—	—
6	Tessa Sunniva	"Bubbly"		—	—	—
7	Ole Feddersen	"I Coast a Dollar"	—	—	—	
8	Vicky & Laura Maas	"Need You Now"	—	—		—
9	Tom Croel	"Geboren Um Zu Leben"	—	—	—	—
10	Charlie Waldschmidt	"A Night Like This"	—	—		
11	Natascha Götz	"Wenn Das Liebe Ist"	—	—	—	—
12	Fanel Cornelius	"Still Got the Blues"		—	—	—
13	Elen Wendt	"Time After Time"				

=== Episode 5: December 8, 2011 ===
Order	Contestant	Song	Coaches' and Contestants' Choices			
Order	Contestant	Song	Nena	Xavier Naidoo	Rea Garvey	The BossHoss
1	Katja Georgos-Spanos	"Heavy Cross"		—	—	
2	Ken Miyao	"Price Tag"	—	—		
3	Erni & Lela	"Sober"		—	—	—
4	Oliver Nagy	"Stay The Night"	—	—	—	—
5	Tiziana Belmonte	"Das Beste"	—	—		—
6	Sahar Haluzy	"I'm Yours"	—	—	—	
7	Ramona Rotstich	"Just a Girl"	—	—		
8	Michael Schulte	"Set Fire to the Rain"	—	—		—
9	Jeannette Dalia Curta	"If You Don't Know Me By Now"	—		—	
10	Leslie Jost	"Price Tag"		—	—	—
11	Carl-Marcel Eckle	"Freaky Like Me"	—	—	—	—
12	Bobby Boobs'n	"Grenade"		—	—	
13	Jessy Lapp	"Nur In Meinem Kopf"	—	—	—	—
14	Bennie McMillan	"Forget You"	—	—	—	
15	Ivy Quainoo	"American Boy"		—		

=== Episode 6: December 9, 2011 ===
Order	Contestant	Song	Coaches' and Contestants' Choices			
Order	Contestant	Song	Nena	Xavier Naidoo	Rea Garvey	The BossHoss
1	Lena Sicks	"Love Story"	—	—		
2	Hermann Muralev	"Halt Dich An Mir Fest"		—	—	—
3	Marijana Vuckovic	"California King Bed"		—	—	
4	Caroline Winter	"Almost Lover"	—	—	—	—
5	Luna Debole	"You Had Me"	—	—	—	—
6	Jasmin Graf	"Because of You"	—	—		—
7	Julius Olschowski	"Still"			—	—
8	Natascha Bell	"What's Up?"	—	—	—	
9	Lukas Kempf	"Somewhere Only We Know"	—	—	—	
10	Annika Yasemin Röken	"Rehab"	—	—	—	
11	Stefan Meyer	"Angels"	—	—	—	—
12	Rola Hinterbichler	"Wenn Das Liebe Ist"	—	—		—
13	Laura Bellon	"Nobody Knows"	—			—
14	Monique Wragg	"Mercy"	—	—		—
15	Stefan Zielasko	"Nur In Meinem Kopf"				

== The second phase: The Battle Rounds ==
The Battle Round was taped in September, 2011 in Berlin and is emitted from the 15th to the 23rd of December in four telecasts. After the end of the Battles every coach had only six candidates, for the rest. Two teams, Xavier and The BossHoss, had to organise a Trio-Battle on account of her odd candidate number. With these The BossHoss were allowed to do two candidates to wide decrees, Xavier, nevertheless, only one. Remained 24 candidates entered in the live shows.

– Battle Winner

=== Episode 7: December 15, 2011 ===
Order	Coach	Contestant	Contestant	Contestant	Song
1.	The BossHoss	Ramona Nerra	Butch Williams		"Ain't No Mountain High Enough"
2.	Nena	Kim Sanders	Alicia Emmi Berg		"Only Girl (In the World)"
3.	Xavier Naidoo	Giovanni Costello	Rüdiger Skoczowsky		"What A Wonderful World"
4.	The BossHoss	Ole Feddersen	Bennie McMillan	Andy Hermes	"Valerie"
5.	Rea Garvey	Laura und Vicky Maas	Michael Schulte		"Falling Slowly"
6.	Nena	Katja Georgas-Spanos	Sharron Levy		"Are You Gonna Be My Girl"
7.	Rea Garvey	Pamela Falcon	Percival Duke		"Purple Rain"

=== Episode 8: December 16, 2011 ===
Order	Coach	Contestant	Contestant	Song
1.	Nena	Nina Kutschera	Leslie Jost	"Superstition"
2.	Xavier Naidoo	Julius Olschowski	Katja Friedenberg	"Krieger des Lichts"
3.	The BossHoss	Vera Luttenberger	Ramona Rotstich	"Love Long Distance"
4.	Xavier Naidoo	Rino Galiano	Stefan Zielasko	"Jesus to a Child"
5.	Rea Garvey	Heiko Schmidt	Lena Sicks	"Eisberg"
6.	The BossHoss	Ivy Quainoo	Annika Yasemin Röken	"Viva la Vida"
7.	Nena	Marijana Vuckovic	Lisa Martine Weller	"Another Way to Die"
8.	Rea Garvey	Arcangelo Vigneri	Charles Simmons	"Everybody Hurts"

=== Episode 9: December 22, 2011 ===
Order	Coach	Contestant	Contestant	Contestant	Song
1.	Xavier Naidoo	Vini Gomes	Dominic Sanz		"Dance with Somebody"
2.	The BossHoss	C. Jay	Charlie Waldschmidt		"Kids"
3.	Nena	Fanel Cornelius	Behnam Moghaddam		"Tears in Heaven"
4.	Rea Garvey	Ken Miyao	Benny Fiedler		"Wonderful Life"
5.	The BossHoss	Shari Fanio	Natascha Bell		"You've Got the Love"
6.	Xavier Naidoo	Laura Martin	Max Giesinger		"Radioactive"
7.	Rea Garvey	Josef Prasil	Mikey Cyrox		"New Shoes"
8.	Nena	Yasmina Hunzinger	Ernie & Lela		"Bring Me to Life"
9.	Xavier Naidoo	Mic Donet	Patricia Meeden	Dilan Koshnaw	"Man's World"

=== Episode 10: December 23, 2011 ===
Order	Coach	Contestant	Contestant	Song
1.	Xavier Naidoo	Benny Martell	Elen Wendt	"Dieses Leben"
2.	Rea Garvey	Tiziana Belmonte	Rola Mardirose Hinterbichler	"Little Numbers"
3.	Nena	Tessa Sunniva	Verena Putzer	"She Will Be Loved"
4.	Rea Garvey	Jasmin Graf	Monique Wragg	"Shut Up and Drive"
5.	BossHoss	Sahar Haluzy	Lukas Kempf	"Champagne Supernova"
6.	Nena	Hermann Muralev	Bobby Bobbs'n	"Allein, Allein"
7.	Xavier Naidoo	Laura Bellon	Jeanette Dalia Curta	"Survivor"

==== Sing-off ====
Each coach nominate 5 singers from their group to advance to the live shows. The 3 remaining singers per group will do a sing-off for the remaining live show spot.

– Sing-off Winner

Coach	Contestant	Contestant	Contestant
Nena	Bobby Bobbs'n	Tessa Sunniva	Yasmina Hunzinger
Xavier Naidoo	Benny Martell	Max Giesinger	Laura Bellon
Rea Garvey	Josef Prasil	Tiziana Belmonte	Jasmin Graf
The BossHoss	Vera Luttenberger	Bennie McMillan	Natascha Bell

== The third phase: The Live Shows ==
The seven live shows will take place between the 5th of January and the 10th of February, 2012. The first show is broadcast by ProSieben on Thursday 5th and the other six by Sat.1 every Friday evening. During the first show the contestants of Xavier Naidoo and The Boss Hoss perform. During the second show the contestants who sing are from Teams Nena and Rea Garvey. After each of these shows, in each team, two contestants are automatically sent to the next round thanks to the votes of the audience, two are voted off and two are chosen by their coaches to stay. After the first two shows, only 16 singers will remain and perform in the third (for teams Boss Hoss and Xavier Naidoo) or fourth (for teams Nena and Rea Garvey) live show. The third show will air on Jan 13 and the fourth, on Jan 20. During the fifth show, on Jan 27, the 12 remaining contestants will perform (3 from each team). During the halffinale, on Feb 3, the 8 remaining contestants will perform (2 from each team). During the finale, on Feb 10, the 4 remaining contestants will perform (1 from each team).

=== Episode 11: January 5, 2012 ===
Team Xavier and Team BossHoss performed.

- Date: 5 January 2012
- Episode: 11
- Channel: ProSieben
- Team: Team Xavier, Team BossHoss
- Celebrity Performer: Snow Patrol with "This Isn't Everything You Are"

Performance Order	Coach Competition Performances	Contestant	Song	Result
1	Xavier Naidoo	Rüdiger Skoczowsky	"Without You"	Eliminated
2	The BossHoss	C. Jay	"Let's Stay Together"	Eliminated
3	Xavier Naidoo	Dominic Sanz	"With or Without You"	Eliminated
4	The BossHoss	Bennie McMillan	"Marry You"	The BossHoss's Vote
5	Xavier Naidoo	Rino Galiano	"How Deep Is Your Love"	Public Vote
6	The BossHoss	Ivy Quainoo	"Toxic"	Public Vote
7	Xavier Naidoo	Mic Donet	"Ain't No Sunshine"	Xavier Naidoo's Vote
8	The BossHoss	Sahar Haluzy	"Teenage Dirtbag"	Eliminated
9	Xavier Naidoo	Katja Friedenberg	"Turning Tables"	Xavier Naidoo's Vote
10	The BossHoss	Ole Feddersen	"No Diggity"	The BossHoss's Vote
11	Xavier Naidoo	Max Giesinger	"Fix You"	Public Vote
12	The BossHoss	Ramona Nerra	"Firework"	Public Vote

Non-competition performances

Performance Order	Performers	Song
1	The Voice Judges; Nena, Xavier Naidoo, Rea Garvey and The BossHoss	"99 Luftballons"
2	Xavier Naidoo and his Team	"Ich kenne nichts (das so schön ist wie du)"
3	Snow Patrol	"This Isn't Everything You Are"

=== Episode 12: January 6, 2012 ===
Team Nena and Team Rea performed.

- Date: 6 January 2012
- Episode: 12
- Channel: Sat.1
- Team: Team Nena, Team Rea
- Celebrity Performer: Söhne Mannheims with "Für dich"

Competition Performances

Performance Order	Coach	Contestant	Song	Result
1	Nena	Nina Kutschera	"Free Your Mind"	Eliminated
2	Rea Garvey	Charles Simmons	"Closer to the Edge"	Eliminated
3	Nena	Behnam Moghaddam	"The Sound of Silence"	Public Vote
4	Rea Garvey	Jasmin Graf	"Wovon sollen wir träumen"	Rea Garvey's vote
5	Nena	Kim Sanders	"All That She Wants"	Nena's vote
6	Rea Garvey	Benny Fiedler	"Eiserner Steg"	Rea Garvey's vote
7	Nena	Sharron Levy	"Ordinary World"	Nena's vote
8	Rea Garvey	Lena Sicks	"Elektrisches Gefühl"	Eliminated
9	Nena	Yasmina Hunzinger	"Heavy on My Heart"	Public Vote
10	Rea Garvey	Michael Schulte	"Creep"	Public Vote
11	Nena	Lisa Martine Weller	"Junimond"	Eliminated
12	Rea Garvey	Percival Duke	"Hedonism"	Public Vote

Non-competition performances

Performance Order	Performers	Song
1	Rea Garvey and his Team	"Can't Stand The Silence"
2	Söhne Mannheims	"Für dich"
3	Nena and her Team	"Kill Your Heroes"

=== Episode 13: January 13, 2012 ===
Team Xavier and Team BossHoss performed.

- Date: 13 January 2012
- Episode: 13
- Channel: Sat.1
- Team: Team Xavier, Team BossHoss
- Celebrity Performer: James Morrison with "Up"

Performance Order	Coach Competition Performances	Contestant	Song	Result
1	The BossHoss	Ramona Nerra	"One"	The BossHoss's Vote
2	Xavier Naidoo	Mic Donet	"Killer" / "Papa Was a Rollin' Stone"	Xavier Naidoo's Vote
3	The BossHoss	Ole Feddersen	"Cello"	Public Vote
4	Xavier Naidoo	Rino Galiano	"Über Sieben Brücken musst Du gehen"	Public Vote
5	The BossHoss	Ivy Quainoo	"Hard to Handle"	Public Vote
6	Xavier Naidoo	Katja Friedenberg	"Flugzeuge in meinem Bauch"	Eliminated
7	The BossHoss	Bennie McMillan	"Fast Car"	Eliminated
8	Xavier Naidoo	Max Giesinger	"I'll Be Waiting"	Public Vote

Non-competition performances

Performance Order	Performers	Song
1	The BossHoss and their Team	"Word Up!"
2	James Morrison, Team Xavier	"Up"

=== Episode 14: January 20, 2012 ===
Team Nena and Team Rea performed.

- Date: 20 January 2012
- Episode: 14
- Channel: Sat.1
- Team: Team Nena, Team Rea
- Celebrity Performer: The BossHoss with "Don't gimme that"

Competition Performances

Performance Order	Coach	Contestant	Song	Result
1	Nena	Yasmina Hunzinger	"Baby Love"	Eliminated
2	Rea Garvey	Benny Fiedler	"Wenn Worte meine Sprache wären"	Eliminated
3	Nena	Sharron Levy	"Burning Down the House"	Nena's vote
4	Rea Garvey	Jasmin Graf	"Stark"	Public Vote
5	Nena	Behnam Moghaddam	"Hurt"	Public Vote
6	Rea Garvey	Michael Schulte	"Human"	Rea Garvey's vote
7	Nena	Kim Sanders	"Killing Me Softly"	Public Vote
8	Rea Garvey	Percival Duke	"Seven Nation Army"	Public Vote

Non-competition performances

Performance Order	Performers	Song
1	Team Rea & Team Nena	"Moves Like Jagger"
2	The BossHoss	"Don't gimme that"

=== Episode 15: January 27, 2012 ===
- Date: 27 January 2012
- Episode: 15
- Channel: Sat.1
- Team: Team Nena, Team Rea, Team Xavier, Team BossHoss
- Celebrity Performer: Rea Garvey with "Colour Me In" & Taio Cruz with "Troublemaker"

Competition Performances

Performance Order	Coach	Contestant	Song	Result
1	The BossHoss	Ivy Quainoo	"Dream a Little Dream of Me"	Public Vote
2	The BossHoss	Ramona Nerra	"Domino"	Eliminated
3	The BossHoss	Ole Feddersen	"Weinst Du"	BossHoss' vote
4	Nena	Sharron Levy	"Somebody That I Used to Know"	Nena's vote
5	Nena	Behnam Moghaddam	"Eleanor Rigby"	Eliminated
6	Nena	Kim Sanders	"Empire State of Mind"	Public Vote
7	Rea Garvey	Percival Duke	"Beautiful"	Eliminated
8	Rea Garvey	Jasmin Graf	"Hungriges Herz"	Rea's vote
9	Rea Garvey	Michael Schulte	"Video Games"	Public Vote
10	Xavier Naidoo	Rino Galiano	"All Night Long"	Eliminated
11	Xavier Naidoo	Mic Donet	"I Believe I Can Fly"	Xavier's vote
12	Xavier Naidoo	Max Giesinger	"Vom Selben Stern"	Public Vote

Non-competition performances

Performance Order	Performers	Song
1	Rea Garvey	"Colour Me In"
2	Taio Cruz and the top 12	"Troublemaker"

=== Episode 16: February 3, 2012 ===
- Date: 3 February 2012
- Episode: 16
- Channel: Sat.1
- Team: Team Nena, Team Rea, Team Xavier, Team BossHoss
- Celebrity Performer:

The remaining acts will perform in a battle and both will perform an entire new song each.

Competition Performances

Performance Order	Coach	Contestant	Song	Result			
Performance Order	Coach	Contestant	Song	Coach points (%)	Public points (%)	Total (%)	Eliminated or Safe?
1	Nena	Sharron Levy	"Drowning"	50%	45.41%	95.41%	Eliminated
2	Nena	Kim Sanders	"Haunted"	50%	54.59%	104.59%	Safe
4	The BossHoss	Ole Feddersen	"Butterfly"	40%	22.45%	62.45%	Eliminated
5	The BossHoss	Ivy Quainoo	"Do You Like What You See"	60%	77.55%	137.55%	Safe
7	Rea Garvey	Michael Schulte	"Carry Me Home"	50%	54.12%	104.12%	Safe
8	Rea Garvey	Jasmin Graf	"So schwer"	50%	45.88%	95.88%	Eliminated
10	Xavier Naidoo	Max Giesinger	"Dach der Welt"	65%	43.23%	108.23%	Safe
11	Xavier Naidoo	Mic Donet	"Losing You"	35%	56.77%	91.77%	Eliminated

The Battles

Performance Order	Coach	Contestant 1	Contestant 2	Song
3	Nena	Kim Sanders	Sharron Levy	"Under Pressure"
6	The BossHoss	Ivy Quainoo	Ole Feddersen	"Under The Bridge"
9	Rea Garvey	Jasmin Graf	Michael Schulte	"Rolling in the Deep"
12	Xavier Naidoo	Max Giesinger	Mic Donet	"Bitter Sweet Symphony"

=== Episode 17: February 10, 2012 ===
- Date: 10 February 2012
- Episode: 17
- Channel: Sat.1
- Team: Team Nena, Team Rea, Team Xavier, Team BossHoss
- Celebrity Performer:

Each contestant perform a longer version of his winner's song, a duet with the coach and a celebrity duet.

Winner's songs

Performance Order	Coach	Contestant	Song	Result
3	Xavier Naidoo	Max Giesinger	"Dach der Welt"	Fourth place (17.99%)
5	Rea Garvey	Michael Schulte	"Carry Me Home"	Third place (23.78%)
7	The BossHoss	Ivy Quainoo	"Do You Like What You See"	Winner (33.65%)
11	Nena	Kim Sanders	"Haunted"	Runner-up (24.58%)

Coaches' duet

Performance Order	Coach	Contestant	Song
1	The BossHoss	Ivy Quainoo	"I Say a Little Prayer"
6	Nena	Kim Sanders	"Love Shack"
10	Rea Garvey	Michael Schulte	"Feeling Good"
12	Xavier Naidoo	Max Giesinger	"Paint It, Black"

Celebrity Duet

Performance Order	Coach	Contestant	Celebrity performer	Song
2	Rea Garvey	Michael Schulte	Ed Sheeran	"The A Team"
4	Nena	Kim Sanders	Marlon Roudette	"Anti Hero (Brave New World)"
8	Xavier Naidoo	Max Giesinger	Katie Melua	"Nine Million Bicycles"
9	The BossHoss	Ivy Quainoo	Florence and the Machine	"Shake It Out"

== Results table ==
–	Contestant was the winner
–	Contestant was the runner-up
–	Contestant was the second runner-up
–	Contestant was the fourth place
–	Contestant was saved by coach's vote
–	Contestant was saved by public's vote
–	Contestant was not chosen by public or coach and was eliminated

=== Team BossHoss ===
Candidate	Battle 1	Battle 2	Battle 3	Battle 4	Sing-Off	Show 1	Show 3	Show 5	Semi-Final	Final
Ivy Quainoo	—N/a	Safe	—N/a	—N/a	—N/a	Safe	Safe	Safe	Safe (137,55 %)	Winner; 33.65%
Ole Feddersen	Safe	—N/a	—N/a	—N/a	—N/a	Safe	Safe	Safe	Eliminated (62.45%)	
Ramona Nerra	Safe	—N/a	—N/a	—N/a	—N/a	Safe	Safe	Eliminated (Show 5)		
Bennie McMillan	Safe	—N/a	—N/a	—N/a	Safe	Safe	Eliminated (Show 3)			
Sahar Haluzy	—N/a	—N/a	—N/a	Safe	—N/a	Eliminated (Show 1)				
C. Jay	—N/a	—N/a	Safe	—N/a	—N/a	Eliminated (Show 1)				
Natascha Bell	—N/a	—N/a	Safe	—N/a	Eliminated (Sing-off)					
Vera Luttenberger	—N/a	Safe	—N/a	—N/a	Eliminated (Sing-off)					
Lukas Kempf	—N/a	—N/a	—N/a	Eliminated (Battle 4)						
Charlie Waldschmidt	—N/a	—N/a	Eliminated (Battle 3)							
Shari Fanio	—N/a	—N/a	Eliminated (Battle 3)							
Annika Yasemin Röken	—N/a	Eliminated (Battle 2)								
Ramona Rotstich	—N/a	Eliminated (Battle 2)								
Andy Hermes	Eliminated (Battle 1)									
Butch Williams	Eliminated (Battle 1)									

=== Team Nena ===
Candidate	Battle 1	Battle 2	Battle 3	Battle 4	Sing-Off	Show 2	Show 4	Show 5	Semi-Final	Final
Kim Sanders	Safe	—N/a	—N/a	—N/a	—N/a	Safe	Safe	Safe	Safe (104,59 %)	Runner-up; 24.58%
Sharron Levy	Safe	—N/a	—N/a	—N/a	—N/a	Safe	Safe	Safe	Eliminated (95,41 %)	
Behnam Moghaddam	—N/a	—N/a	Safe	—N/a	—N/a	Safe	Safe	Eliminated (Show 5)		
Yasmina Hunzinger	—N/a	—N/a	Safe	—N/a	Safe	Safe	Eliminated (Show 4)			
Nina Kutschera	—N/a	Safe	—N/a	—N/a	—N/a	Eliminated (Show 2)				
Lisa Martine Weller	—N/a	Safe	—N/a	—N/a	—N/a	Eliminated (Show 2)				
Tessa Sunniva	—N/a	—N/a	—N/a	Safe	Eliminated (Sing-off)					
Bobby Bobbs'n	—N/a	—N/a	—N/a	Safe	Eliminated (Sing-off)					
Hermann Muralev	—N/a	—N/a	—N/a	Eliminated (Battle 4)						
Verena Putzer	—N/a	—N/a	—N/a	Eliminated (Battle 4)						
Ernie & Lela	—N/a	—N/a	Eliminated (Battle 3)							
Fanel Cornelius	—N/a	—N/a	Eliminated (Battle 3)							
Leslie Jost	—N/a	Eliminated (Battle 2)								
Marijana Vuckovic	—N/a	Eliminated (Battle 2)								
Alicia Emmi Berg	Eliminated (Battle 1)									
Katja Georgas-Spanos	Eliminated (Battle 1)									

=== Team Rea ===
Candidate	Battle 1	Battle 2	Battle 3	Battle 4	Sing-Off	Show 2	Show 4	Show 5	Semi-Final	Final
Michael Schulte	Safe	—N/a	—N/a	—N/a	—N/a	Safe	Safe	Safe	Safe (104,12 %)	3rd place 23.65%
Jasmin Graf	—N/a	—N/a	—N/a	Safe	Safe	Safe	Safe	Safe	Eliminated (95,88 %)	
Percival Duke	Safe	—N/a	—N/a	—N/a	—N/a	Safe	Safe	Eliminated (Show 5)		
Benny Fiedler	—N/a	—N/a	Safe	—N/a	—N/a	Safe	Eliminated (Show 4)			
Lena Sicks	—N/a	Safe	—N/a	—N/a	—N/a	Eliminated (Show 2)				
Charles Simmons	—N/a	Safe	—N/a	—N/a	—N/a	Eliminated (Show 2)				
Tiziana Belmonte	—N/a	—N/a	—N/a	Safe	Eliminated (Sing-off)					
Josef Prasil	—N/a	—N/a	Safe	—N/a	Eliminated (Sing-off)					
Monique Wragg	—N/a	—N/a	—N/a	Eliminated (Battle 4)						
Rola Mardirose Hinterbichler	—N/a	—N/a	—N/a	Eliminated (Battle 4)						
Ken Miyao	—N/a	—N/a	Eliminated (Battle 3)							
Mikey Cyrox	—N/a	—N/a	Eliminated (Battle 3)							
Arcangelo Vigneri	—N/a	Eliminated (Battle 2)								
Heiko Schmidt	—N/a	Eliminated (Battle 2)								
Laura & Vicky Maas	Eliminated (Battle 1)									
Pamela Falcon	Eliminated (Battle 1)									

=== Team Xavier ===
Candidate	Battle 1	Battle 2	Battle 3	Battle 4	Sing-Off	Show 1	Show 3	Show 5	Semi-Final	Final
Max Giesinger	—N/a	—N/a	Safe	—N/a	Safe	Safe	Safe	Safe	Safe (108,23 %)	4th place 17.99%
Mic Donet	—N/a	—N/a	Safe	—N/a	—N/a	Safe	Safe	Safe	Eliminated (91,77 %)	
Rino Galiano	—N/a	Safe	—N/a	—N/a	—N/a	Safe	Safe	Eliminated (Show 5)		
Katja Friedenberg	—N/a	Safe	—N/a	—N/a	—N/a	Safe	Eliminated (Show 3)			
Rüdiger Skoczowsky	Safe	—N/a	—N/a	—N/a	—N/a	Eliminated (Show 1)				
Dominic Sanz	—N/a	—N/a	Safe	—N/a	—N/a	Eliminated (Show 1)				
Benny Martell	—N/a	—N/a	—N/a	Safe	Eliminated (Sing-off)					
Laura Bellon	—N/a	—N/a	—N/a	Safe	Eliminated (Sing-off)					
Elen Wendt	—N/a	—N/a	—N/a	Eliminated (Battle 4)						
Jeanette Dalia Curta	—N/a	—N/a	—N/a	Eliminated (Battle 4)						
Dilan Koshnaw	—N/a	—N/a	Eliminated (Battle 3)							
Laura Martin	—N/a	—N/a	Eliminated (Battle 3)							
Patricia Meeden	—N/a	—N/a	Eliminated (Battle 3)							
Vini Gomes	—N/a	—N/a	Eliminated (Battle 3)							
Julius Olschowski	—N/a	Eliminated (Battle 2)								
Stefan Zielasko	—N/a	Eliminated (Battle 2)								
Giovanni Costello	Eliminated (Battle 1)									

== Elimination Chart ==
=== Overall ===
Color key
Artist's info

- Artist from Team Xavier Naidoo
- Artist from Team TheBossHoss
- Artist from Team Rea Garvey
- Artist from Team Nena

Result details

- Winner
- Runner-up
- Third place
- Fourth place
- Artist Saved by the public
- Artist Saved by his/her coach
- Artist was eliminated
- Artist did not perform on that particular week

Live show results per week
Artist	Week 1	Week 2	Week 3	Week 4	Week 5	Week 6	Finals
Ivy Quainoo	Safe		Safe		Safe	Safe	Winner
Kim Sanders		Safe		Safe	Safe	Safe	Runner-Up
Michael Schulte		Safe		Safe	Safe	Safe	3rd place
Max Giesinger	Safe		Safe		Safe	Safe	4th place
Ole Feddersen	Safe		Safe		Safe	Eliminated	Eliminated (Week 6)
Jasmin Graf		Safe		Safe	Safe	Eliminated	Eliminated (Week 6)
Sharron Levy		Safe		Safe	Safe	Eliminated	Eliminated (Week 6)
Mic Donet	Safe		Safe		Safe	Eliminated	Eliminated (Week 6)
Rino Galiano	Safe		Safe		Eliminated	Eliminated (Week 5)	
Percival Duke		Safe		Safe	Eliminated	Eliminated (Week 5)	
Behnam Moghaddam		Safe		Safe	Eliminated	Eliminated (Week 5)	
Ramona Nerra	Safe		Safe		Eliminated	Eliminated (Week 5)	
Benny Fiedler		Safe		Eliminated	Eliminated (Week 4)		
Yasmina Hunzinger		Safe		Eliminated	Eliminated (Week 4)		
Bennie McMillan	Safe		Eliminated	Eliminated (Week 3)			
Katja Friedenberg	Safe		Eliminated	Eliminated (Week 3)			
Lena Sicks		Eliminated	Eliminated (Week 2)				
Charles Simmons		Eliminated	Eliminated (Week 2)				
Lisa Martine Weller		Eliminated	Eliminated (Week 2)				
Nina Kutschera		Eliminated	Eliminated (Week 2)				
Dominic Sanz	Eliminated	Eliminated (Week 1)					
Rüdiger Skoczowsky	Eliminated	Eliminated (Week 1)					
Sahar Haluzy	Eliminated	Eliminated (Week 1)					
C. Jay	Eliminated	Eliminated (Week 1)					

== Ratings ==
Episode	Channel	Date	Viewers		Market Share	
Episode	Channel	Date	All	14 to 49 years	All	14 to 49 years
1	ProSieben	24 Nov 2011	3.89 Mio.	3.06 Mio.	12.4%	23.8%
2	Sat.1	25 Nov 2011	4.36 Mio.	3.05 Mio.	14.3%	26.6%
3	ProSieben	1 Dec 2011	4.58 Mio.	3.51 Mio.	14.9%	27.8%
4	Sat.1	2 Dec 2011	4.89 Mio.	3.37 Mio.	15.8%	28.2%
5	ProSieben	8 Dec 2011	5.21 Mio.	3.96 Mio.	16.8%	30.9%
6	Sat.1	9 Dec 2011	4.53 Mio.	3.17 Mio.	15.3%	28.2%
7	ProSieben	15 Dec 2011	4.86 Mio.	3.68 Mio.	15.1%	28.4%
8	Sat.1	16 Dec 2011	5.02 Mio.	3.47 Mio.	16.4%	30.2%
9	ProSieben	22 Dec 2011	4.89 Mio.	3.60 Mio.	15.7%	28.6%
10	Sat.1	23 Dec 2011	4.39 Mio.	3.02 Mio.	14.1%	24.4%
11	ProSieben	5 Jan 2012	4.18 Mio.	3.02 Mio.	14.1%	25.8%
12	Sat.1	6 Jan 2012	4.00 Mio.	2.82 Mio.	13.1%	23.7%
13	Sat.1	13 Jan 2012	3.42 Mio.	2.37 Mio.	10.5%	18.8%
14	Sat.1	20 Jan 2012	2.85 Mio.	1.90 Mio.	8.7%	15.5%
15	Sat.1	27 Jan 2012	3.44 Mio.	2.36 Mio.	11.1%	19.9%
16	Sat.1	3 Feb 2012	3.18 Mio.	2.12 Mio.	10.1%	17.5%
17	Sat.1	10 Feb 2012	4.01 Mio.	2.64 Mio.	12.9%	22.2%
