= Ivy (Ivy Quainoo album) =

Studio album by Ivy Quainoo
- Released: 2 March 2012
- Length: 68:15
- Label: We Love Music

Ivy Quainoo chronology
Ivy (2012)	Wildfires (2013)

Singles from Ivy
- 1. "Do You Like What You See" Released: 3 February 2012; 2. "You Got Me" Released: 7 June 2012; 3. "Who You Are" Released: 16 November 2012

Ivy is the debut studio album by German singer Ivy Quainoo. It was released by Warner Music on 2 March 2012 in German-speaking Europe following her win of the first series of The Voice of Germany. The album was chiefly produced by Marek Pompetzki, Paul NZA, Cecil Remmler as well as André "Brix" Buchmann and Mathias Ramson, with additional contribution from Ivo Moring, Thorsten Brötzmann, and Roland Spremberg. The BossHoss, Mousse T., and Stanfour are credited as guest vocalists.

The album was generally well received by critics, who praised Ivy Quainoo’s voice and considered it a strong and authentic casting-show debut despite some criticism of its lyrics and production. It also achieved solid commercial success, peaking at number five in Germany and earning a Gold certification for over 100,000 units shipped. Ivy was promoted by three singles, "Do You Like What You See", "You Got Me" and "Who You Are," and supported by The Ivy Quainoo Tour in 2012.

== Promotion ==
The album was promoted through three singles. The lead single, "Do You Like What You See," was released on 3 February 2012 and became a major hit, reaching number two in Germany, number eight in Austria, and number twelve in Switzerland. The song was later certified Gold in Germany for shipments figures of more than 150,000 copies. It was followed by "You Got Me", released on 7 June 2012, which peaked at number 31 in Germany and entered the charts in Austria and Switzerland at numbers 61 in both countries, while a third single, "Who You Are," a collaboration with Stanfour that was issued on released on 16 November 2012, peaked at number 49 in Germany. In further support of the album, Quainoo embarked on The Ivy Quainoo Tour from May to June 2012.

== Critical reception ==
Professional ratings
Review scores
Source	Rating
laut.de	3/5 stars
Plattentests	6/10

Uli Brechtold from laut.de rated the album three out of five stars. He described Ivy as a surprisingly accomplished pop-soul debut that exceeds the low expectations often associated with casting-show winners. Praising Quainoo's "soulful voice" and the album's rich instrumentation, he highlighted several songs for their orchestral arrangements and upbeat atmosphere. Although he criticized the lyrics as "flat and predictable," Brechtold concluded that the producers successfully tailored the 14 tracks to Quainoo's talent, calling the final result "surprisingly good" for a cast artist.

Similarly, Plattentests's Mark Read praised Ivy as an unusually authentic and accomplished casting-show debut. While acknowledging the album's rapid production process, he highlighted Quainoo's "smoky and powerful voice" and particularly commended the album's blend of soul, indie, and pop influences, as well as Quainoo's individuality and emotional delivery, concluding that Ivy was "probably the best album by a German casting-show winner" because it feels "authentic" and artist-driven. Marcus Becker from Beatblogger praised Ivy as a soulful and varied debut that rises above typical casting-show releases, also highlighting Quainoo's distinctive voice and the album's strong collection of catchy pop songs.

== Commercial performance ==
Ivy achieved solid commercial success in the German-speaking market. The album peaked at number five on the German Albums Chart, while also reaching number ten in Switzerland and number eleven in Austria. In Germany, it additionally placed at number 41 on the year-end albums chart for 2012, and was later certified Gold by the Bundesverband Musikindustrie for shipments exceeding 100,000 units.

== Track listing ==
Ivy track listing
No.	Title	Writer(s)	Producer(s)	Length
1.	"Do You Like What You See"	Sylvia Gordon; Konstantin "Djorkaeff" Scherer; Vincent "Beatzarre" Stein	Marek Pompetzki; Paul NZA; Cecil Remmler	4:02
2.	"Shark in the Water"	VV Brown; Tommy Tysper; Markus Reza Sepehrmanesh	Pompetzki; Paul NZA; Remmler	3:00
3.	"Breakaway"	Tim Larsson; Johan Fransson; Tobias Lundgren; Audra Mae	Roland Spremberg	4:39
4.	"Walk Man"	Bruce Roberts; Aimée Proal; Scherer; Stein	Pompetzki; Paul NZA; Remmler	3:10
5.	"You Got Me"	Skylar Mones; Johnnie Forster; Scotty Granger	Pompetzki; Paul NZA; Remmler	3:01
6.	"I Say a Little Prayer" (featuring The BossHoss)	Burt Bacharach; Hal David	Hoss Power	3:07
7.	"Whatever You Do"	Alexander Schroer	Brix; Mathias Ramson	2:43
8.	"Glass Houses"	Alex Geringas; Dee Adam; Kai	Brix; Ramson	3:13
9.	"You Can't Put a Price On Love"	Tobias Neumann; Marcus Brosch; Duncan Townsend; Neele Ternes	Brix; Ramson	3:00
10.	"Richest Girl"	Thorsten Brötzmann; Andy Love; Jan Löchel; Femme Schmidt	Brötzmann; Jan Löchel; Power; Ivo Moring	3:51
11.	"Castles"	Ben Harrison; Ben Collier; Raphaella Mazaheri-Asadi	Brix; Ramson	3:24
12.	"Pure"	Power	Power	3:07
13.	"Soul Suckers"	Ryan Anthony Massaro	Jan Löchel	2:49
14.	"Shake It Out" (live version; Florence and the Machine featuring Ivy Quainoo; bonus track)	Florence Welch; Paul Epworth	Epworth	3:11
Total length:				68:15

Deluxe gold edition (bonus tracks)
No.	Title	Writer(s)	Producer(s)	Length
15.	"Men Do What They Can" (featuring Mousse T.)	Errol Rennalls; Mousse T.	Mousse T.	3:30
16.	"Who You Are" (featuring Stanfour)	Justin Balk; Dimitri Ehrlich; Bernd Klimpel	Pompetzki; Brötzmann	3:50
17.	"Not a Lady" (hotelroom demo)	Quainoo; Löchel	Löchel	1:46

== Charts ==
=== Weekly charts ===
Weekly chart performance for Ivy
Chart (2012)	Peak position
Austrian Albums (Ö3 Austria)	11
German Albums (Offizielle Top 100)	5
Swiss Albums (Schweizer Hitparade)	10

=== Year-end charts ===
Year-end chart performance for Ivy
Chart (2012)	Position
German Albums (Offizielle Top 100)	41

== Certifications ==
Certifications for Ivy
Region	Certification	Certified units/sales
Germany (BVMI)	Gold	100,000^{^}
^{^} Shipments figures based on certification alone.

== Release history ==
Ivy release history
Region	Date	Format	Label	Ref.
Various	2 March 2012	Digital download; CD	Universal Music	
