= Skylar Mones =

American musician

- Origin: Albuquerque, New Mexico
- Genres: R&B, hip hop, pop, electro
- Years active: 2010–present

Skylar Mones is an American songwriter, record producer, engineer, and arranger. Skylar’s professional music career began in 2010 doing remixes, engineering and production for Flo Rida, Adam Lambert, Diggy Simmons, and Rihanna. He garnered commercial success as a writer and producer domestically as well as overseas starting in 2012 crafting songs for Namie Amuro, W-inds, Daichi Miura, TVXQ, Ivy Quainoo and E-girls. He currently lives in Los Angeles and continues to write and produce for various international and domestic acts.

More recently, he produced the hit song Cherry on Top with Bini, a popular girl group from the Philippines.

== Discography ==
Year	Artist	Album	Track	Contribution/notes
2011	Rihanna	Talk That Talk	"Watch n' Learn"	Engineer/arrangement
2012	Ivy Quainoo	Ivy	"You Got Me"	Writer/producer
2012	Adam Lambert	Trespassing	"Pop That Lock"	Engineer/arrangement
2012	Flo Rida	Wild Ones	"Wild Ones"	Engineer
2012	Daichi Miura	The Entertainer	"Baby Just Time"	Writer/producer
2013	Vassy	Beautiful Day	"The Weekend", "Girls and Boyz"	Writer/producer
2013	TVXQ	Time: Live Tour 2013 DVD	"T Style"	Writer/producer
2014	After Romeo	After Romeo	"Love on Lock"	Writer/producer; U.S. Billboard Trending Chart #4
2014	W-Inds	A Little Bit	"Tell Me What You're Waiting For"	Writer/producer
2014	W-Inds	A Little Bit	"A Little Bit"	Writer/producer
2015	Dish	Main Dish	"Love on Lock"	Writer/producer
2015	Namie Amuro	Genic	"Fly"	Writer/producer; Oricon Daily Albums Chart #1
2015	Yunho	U Know Y	"T Style" & "Burning Down"	Co-writer/producer
2015	Tritonal (group) and Cash Cash	Untouchable	"Untouchable"	Engineer
2015	Justine Skye	Emotionally Unavailable	"I'm Yours"	Co-producer
2016	E-Girls		"Pink Champagne"	カウガール・ラプソディ RIAJ Recording Industry Association of Japan certified gold; co-writer/producer
2017	Silentó	Young Love	"Young Love"	Co-writer/producer
2017	Carlie Hanson	Only One	"Only One"	Co-writer/producer
2018	Oh My Girl	Secret Garden	"Magic"	Co-writer/producer
2018	BoA	Mannish Chocolat	"Mannish Chocolat"	Co-writer/producer
2019	Monsta X	Follow: Find You	"Follow"	Co-writer/producer
2019	Carlie Hanson	Junk	"WYA"	Co-writer/producer
2019	Carlie Hanson	Junk	"Bored with You"	Co-writer/producer
2019	Carlie Hanson	Junk	"Numb"	Co-writer/producer
2019	Dua Lipa	Future Nostalgia	"Future Nostalgia"	Co-producer
2020	Kesha	High Road	"High Road"	Co-producer
2021	exo	Don't Fight the Feeling	"No Matter"	Co-producer
2021	Patrick Bruel	À la santé des gens que j'aime	"À la santé des gens que j'aime"	Co-producer
2021	Red Velvet (group)	Queendom (EP)	"Better Be"	Co-producer
2022	Jennifer Lopez	Marry Me (soundtrack)	"Love of My Life"	Co-producer
2022	Becky G	Esquemas	"Buen Dia"	Producer
2024	Bini	Biniverse	"Cherry on Top"	Producer
