= Kirsten Price =

Kirsten Price may refer to:

- Kirsten Price (actress) (born 1981), American model and adult film actress.
- Kirsten Price (musician), English-American musician.
