= You Got Me =

You Got Me or U Got Me may refer to:

== Film ==
- You Got Me! (film), a 2007 Filipino comedy

== Music ==
=== Songs ===
- "You Got Me" (The Roots song), 1999
- "You Got Me" (J.Williams song), 2010
- "You Got Me" (Ivy Quainoo song), 2012
- "You Got Me" (Mýa song), 2018
- "You Got Me", a song by Tommy James in 1980
- "You Got Me", a song by Mariah Carey from Charmbracelet
- "You Got Me", a song by One Block Radius
- "You Got Me", a song by Toto from The Seventh One
- "You Got Me", a song by Colbie Caillat from Breakthrough
- "You Got Me", a song by Crash Kings from Crash Kings
- "You Got Me", a song by Keke Palmer
- "You Got Me", a song by Dave Alvin from Romeo's Escape
- "U Got Me", a song by B5
- "U Got Me", a song by T-Pain from Rappa Ternt Sanga
