= Magic Tree =

Magic Tree may refer to:

- "Magic Tree" (single), the 2007 single by musician Kirsten Price
- Little Trees, a disposable air freshener known as "Magic Tree" in the UK until 2011
- The Magic Tree (TV Series), a Polish television program for children
- L'arbre enchanté (The Magic Tree), an opéra comique by Christoph Willibald Gluck

== See also ==
- Magical Tree, a 1984 video game
