= Aiding the enemy =

Aiding the enemy may refer to:

- Uniform Code of Military Justice, Article 104
- "Aiding the Enemy!" (Pokémon episode), a 2008 episode of Pokémon
