= Do You Like What You See =

Single by Ivy Quainoo

from the album Ivy
- Released: 3 February 2012
- Recorded: 2012
- Genre: Soul; pop
- Length: 4:04
- Label: Universal Music
- Songwriter(s): Sylvia Gordon; Konstantin "Djorkaeff" Scherer; Vincent "Beatzarre" Stein
- Producer(s): Marek Pompetzki; Paul NZA; Cecil Remmler

Ivy Quainoo singles chronology
"Do You Like What You See" (2012)	"You Got Me" (2012)

"Do You Like What You See" is the debut single by German singer Ivy Quainoo who won the first series of The Voice of Germany. It was released as a Digital download in Germany on February 3, 2012 as the lead single from her debut studio album Ivy (2012). The song was written by Sylvia Gordon, Konstantin "Djorkaeff" Scherer, Vincent "Beatzarre" Stein and produced by Marek Pompetzki, Paul NZA, Cecil Remmler.

== Track listing ==
Digital download
No.	Title	Length
1.	"Do You Like What You See"	4:04

== Credits and personnel ==
- Lead vocals – Ivy Quainoo
- Producers – Marek Pompetzki, Paul NZA, Cecil Remmler
- Lyrics – Sylvia Gordon, Konstantin "Djorkaeff" Scherer, Vincent "Beatzarre" Stein
- Label: Universal Music

== Chart performance ==
=== Weekly charts ===
Chart (2012)	Peak position
Austria (Ö3 Austria Top 40)	8
Germany (GfK)	2
Switzerland (Schweizer Hitparade)	12
Luxembourg (Billboard)	8

=== Year-end charts ===
Chart (2012)	Position
Germany (Media Control AG)	67

== Release history ==
Region	Date	Format	Label
Germany	3 February 2012	Digital download	Universal Music
