= Boy Like You =

2010 single by Charlee

Single by Charlee

from the album This Is Me
- Released: August 27, 2010
- Recorded: 2010
- Genre: Dance-pop; electropop
- Length: 3:07
- Label: Polydor
- Songwriters: Kesha Sebert; David Gamson; Alex James

Charlee singles chronology
"Boy Like You" (2010)	"Inside Out" (2016)

"Boy Like You" is the debut single by Austrian electropop singer Charlee. The song was co-written by Kesha, David Gamson and Alex James. It was initially planned for release on Kesha's debut studio album, Animal (2010), but upon halt of its release, it was handed to Charlee for her debut single. "Boy Like You" was released on August 27, 2010 as the lead single from Charlee's debut studio album, This Is Me (2011).

== Track listing ==
- Physical release
1. "Boy Like You (Single Version)" – 03:07
2. "Boy Like You (The Disco Boys Remix)" – 07:12
- Digital download
1. "Boy Like You (Single Version)" – 03:07
2. "Boy Like You (The Disco Boys Remix)" – 07:12
3. "Boy Like You (Vinylshakerz Remix)" – 06:13
4. "Boy Like You (Tuneverse Remix)" – 04:25
5. "Boy Like You (Paul Wex Remix)" – 06:59
6. "Boy Like You (music video)" – 03:07

== Release history ==
Region	Date	Format
Austria	August 27, 2010	CD single, digital download
Germany	August 27, 2010	CD single, digital download

== Charts ==
Chart (2010)	Peak position
Austria Singles Charts	16
Germany Singles Charts	86
