= The 2930s =

German-Australian band

- Origin: Berlin, Germany
- Genres: Indie Punk Rock
- Years active: 2009–present
- Label: Internashville Recordings
- Members: Andre "Guss Brooks" Neumann, Joshua "The Josh" Angus, Olli "Animal" Kunze
- Past members: Andreas "The Stig" Henschel, Nicola "Nico The Lips" Lippolis, "Mr. Tide" Steffen Thiede
- Website: www.the2930s.com

The 2930s is a band from Berlin which started in 2009 by Guss Brooks of The BossHoss and Australian musician The Josh. Originally a studio-only project, after a few months of writing and recording, the band decided to perform live shows. Wanting to perform in a style and musical direction different from their other projects, The 2930s perform a mix of roots-based garage rock and roll, with a touch of indie pop.

== Band history ==
The band was formed in 2009 in Berlin by Guss Brooks and The Josh when there was a break in The BossHoss touring schedule. The band started with the concept of a studio/recording project, with The Stig performing the drums. As all 3 members were already performing in bands with country, blues, rockabilly or classic rock music direction, the band decided to write songs in a heavier, punk, garage and indie rock direction.

The original rehearsals and song writing took place in Dresden, Germany in late 2009 and when they had enough to do so, they performed live in between the schedules of their other projects, along with recording. Their first recording sessions began in November 2009 at Sonnenstudio, Berlin. Their first live show was at Rosis Amüsierlokal in Dresden on the 29 and 30 December 2009.

In March 2010, The 2930s performed support for The BossHoss at the Alte Schlachthof in Dresden.

In June 2010 The 2930s finished their first release. A limited edition self-release E.P. "The Ride", with 6 original songs all recorded at Sonnenstudio/ Internashville Recordings in Berlin.

With the success of The BossHoss, Guss Brooks schedule was full, and so recording and song writing time was very limited. However, eventually in 2014 the band could release their first full-length CD "Reaching The Highs/Touching The Lows".

After the release of "Reaching The Highs/Touching The Lows", The Josh built his own studio in Dresden called "Catalina Music" and continued to write and record for their 3rd release.

With the help of their close connection to Alec "Boss“ Völkel, Sascha "Hoss“ Vollmer, The 2930s released their 2nd CD "Tell Me I'm Crazy" on The BossHoss new record label "Internashville Recordings" and performed support shows with The BossHoss during their Dos Bros Tour in April 2016.

In late 2017, The 2930s released "Drive", again on The BossHoss label Internashville Recordings.

== Discography ==
=== Studio albums ===
- 2010 - The Ride EP
- 2014 - Reaching The Highs / Touching The Lows
- 2016 - Tell Me I'm Crazy (Internashville Recordings)
- 2017 - Drive
