= Pokémon: Diamond and Pearl: Battle Dimension =

Eleventh season of the Pokémon animated television series

- Season 11
- Japanese logo (top); The English title screen from the Pokémon: DP Battle Dimension season. (bottom)
- No. of episodes: 52

Release
- Original network: TV Tokyo
- Original release: November 8, 2007 – December 4, 2008

Season chronology
- ← Previous; Diamond and Pearl Next → DP: Galactic Battles

Pokémon: Diamond and Pearl: Battle Dimension (Note: advertised simply as Pokémon: DP Battle Dimension) is the eleventh season of the Pokémon anime series and the second season of Pokémon the Series: Diamond and Pearl, known in Japan as Pocket Monsters Diamond & Pearl (ポケットモンスター ダイヤモンド&パール, Poketto Monsutā Daiyamondo & Pāru). It originally aired in Japan from November 8, 2007, to December 4, 2008, on TV Tokyo, and in the United States from April 12, 2008, to May 2, 2009, on Cartoon Network.

The season follows Ash Ketchum as he continues travelling across the Sinnoh region with Brock and Dawn.

Beginning with this season all the way up to the twenty second, DuArt Film and Video would serve as TPCi's producing partner for the English dub, taking over from TAJ Productions.

== Episode list ==
Jap. overall	Eng. overall	No. in season	English title Japanese title	Original release date	English air date
521	516	1	"Tears for Fears!" (Hikozaru's Tears!); Transliteration: "Hikozaru no Namida!" (Japanese: ヒコザルの涙！)	November 8, 2007	April 12, 2008
After realizing how different Ash treats him than how Paul used to, Chimchar starts crying. Things begin to get worse when a trio of Zangoose attack. Can Chimchar overcome its fear and save the day?
522	517	2	"Once There Were Greenfields" (Natane and Sabonea! Farewell to Whom!); Transliteration: "Natane to Sabonea! Sayonara wa Dare no Tame!" (Japanese: ナタネとサボネア！さよならは誰のため！)	November 15, 2007	April 19, 2008
Gardenia is in town, organizing a special exhibition battle for the town's children. When she finds out about James' Cacnea, she is impressed. However, James begins to wonder if he is the best trainer for it when Cacnea's attempts to learn Drain Punch resorts in failure after failure, and is thinking about giving it up to Gardenia.
523	518	3	"Throwing the Track Switch" (Aipom and Buizel! Respective Roads!!); Transliteration: "Eipamu to Buizeru! Sorezore no Michi!!" (Japanese: エイパムとブイゼル！それぞれの道！！)	November 22, 2007	April 26, 2008
Buizel is more interested in Ash's gym training, and Aipom is more interested in Dawn's contest training. Thus, Zoey suggests that Ash and Dawn do a trade.
524	519	4	"The Keystone Pops!" (Mikaruge's Keystone!); Transliteration: "Mikaruge no Kanameishi!" (Japanese: ミカルゲの要石！)	November 29, 2007	May 10, 2008
After Ash's Buizel destroys the Hallowed Tower, a Spiritomb is unleashed and attacks Ash, Dawn, Brock and a nearby village.
525	520	5	"Bibarel Gnaws Best!" (Bidaru Knew!); Transliteration: "Bīdaru wa Shitteita!" (Japanese: ビーダルは知っていた！)	November 29, 2007	May 17, 2008
Ash's group encounters a Pokémon Breeder working on the construction of a stone bridge. The woman is arguing with the bridge's designer because of their Pokémon assistant Bibarel's refusal to work.
526	521	6	"Nosing 'Round the Mountain!" (Dainose! Burning Spirit!!); Transliteration: "Dainōzu! Atsuki Tamashii!!" (Japanese: ダイノーズ！熱き魂！！)	December 6, 2007	May 24, 2008
Ash battles Alan, a trainer that wants his Nosepass to evolve into a Probopass, but it can only evolve if it levels up in Mt. Coronet. When it does, Team Rocket brainwashes it and now Ash & Co. have to get it back.
527	522	7	"Luxray Vision!" (Rentorar's Eye!); Transliteration: "Rentorā no Hitomi!" (Japanese: レントラーの瞳！)	December 13, 2007	May 31, 2008
Ash encounters a young Officer Jenny named Marble and her Luxray, who is unable to use its electric moves, so Ash & Co. set out to help it.
528	523	8	"Journey to the Unown!" (The Unknown of Zui Ruins!); Transliteration: "Zui no Iseki no Annōn!" (Japanese: ズイの遺跡のアンノーン！)	December 20, 2007	June 7, 2008
Ash's Group meet up with Kenny and venture into the Solaceon Ruins, however they get more than they bargained for when Saturn from Team Galactic is also there to steal a mysterious cube, and the Unown residing in the ruins abduct Dawn and Aipom.
529	524	9	"Team Shocker!" (Pokémon Contest! Zui Tournament!!); Transliteration: "Pokémon Kontesto! Zui Taikai!!" (Japanese: ポケモンコンテスト！ズイ大会！！)	December 20, 2007	June 14, 2008
It's the day of the Solaceon Town contest, and Dawn is looking for redemption after her crushing loss in Hearthome City. Dawn doesn't make it past the first round and Jessie, as Jessalina, wins her very first ribbon.
530	525	10	"Tanks for the Memories!" (Miltank of the Maid Café!); Transliteration: "Meido Kafe no Mirutanku!" (Japanese: メイドカフェのミルタンク！)	January 10, 2008	June 21, 2008
On their way to Veilstone City, Ash and his friends stop off at the Mountain Hut Maid Café for a nice drink of Miltank's Milk. However, when they arrive, they learn of the troubles the Café is having, being under-staffed. Ash and his friends offer their services and soon become Maids in the Café. Brock helps Autumn, the youngest of three sisters bond with her Miltank, nicknamed Ilta. All the while, Dawn is trying deal with her feelings of losing two consecutive contests.
531	526	11	"Hot Springing a Leak!" (The Urimoo Trio and the Steaming Hot Water Battle!!); Transliteration: "Urimū Torio to Yukemuri Batoru!!" (Japanese: ウリムートリオと湯けむりバトル！！)	January 17, 2008	June 28, 2008
Ash and his friends stop at a Hot Spring managed by Dawn's childhood friend, Leona. Both girls are happy to meet again, but when Dawn and her friends want to go to the hot springs, they find out that there isn't any water. Because no water is coming from the spring, the group go to investigate, along with Leona and her Swinub.
532	527	12	"Riding the Winds of Change!" (Glion and Gligar! Escaping the Maze of Wind!); Transliteration: "Guraion to Guraigā! Kaze no Meiro o Nukete!!" (Japanese: グライオンとグライガー！風の迷路をぬけて！！)	January 24, 2008	July 5, 2008
Ash and company visit a town where it is plagued with a group of Gligar led by a Gliscor. Ash and friends help Officer Jenny try to remove the flying Pokémon, while Ash's rival Paul sets his eyes on capturing Gliscor. Ash bonds with a clumsy Gligar, which he catches.
533	528	13	"Sleight of Sand!" (Pachirisu is in Kabarudon's Mouth!?); Transliteration: "Pachirisu wa Kabarudon no Kuchi no Naka!?" (Japanese: パチリスはカバルドンの口の中！？)	January 31, 2008	July 12, 2008
When our heroes' Pokémon are having a fun time in a sandpit, a Hippowdon appears from within. However, the over-curious Pachirisu can't help peeping into the Hippowdon's mouth and accidentally falls into it. The situation gets worse when Hippowdon becomes the target of the Team Rocket duo Butch and Cassidy.
534	529	14	"Lost Leader Strategy!" (Lucario! Wave Bomb of Anger!!); Transliteration: "Rukario! Ikari no Hadōdan!!" (Japanese: ルカリオ！怒りのはどうだん！！)	February 7, 2008	July 19, 2008
The Group meet a young female martial-artist named Maylene, the Veilstone City Gym Leader, but is depressed after her defeat from Paul. Meanwhile, the group also meet Paul's older brother, Reggie, who helps Ash's Staravia learn Brave Bird.
535	530	15	"Crossing the Battle Line!" (Hikari's First Gym Battle!!); Transliteration: "Hikari Hajimete no Jimu Batoru!!" (Japanese: ヒカリはじめてのジムバトル！！)	February 14, 2008	July 26, 2008
Dawn challenges Maylene in hopes of helping Maylene get over her defeat.
536	531	16	"A Triple Fighting Chance!" (Tobari Gym! Lucario Against Buoysel!!); Transliteration: "Tobari Jimu! Rukario Tai Buizeru!!" (Japanese: トバリジム！ルカリオ対ブイゼル！！)	February 28, 2008	August 2, 2008
Maylene finally accepts Ash's challenge and the two have their Gym Battle, can Ash win the Cobble Badge?
537	532	17	"Enter Galactic!" (Lovely Fashion! Their Name is Team Galaxy!!); Transliteration: "Suteki Fasshon! Sono na wa Ginga-dan!!" (Japanese: ステキファッション！その名はギンガ団！！)	March 6, 2008	August 9, 2008
Team Galactic is back, and are aiming to steal several meteoric stones for their world domination plans.
538	533	18	"The Bells Are Singing!" (Pull Yourself Together, Lisyan!); Transliteration: "Shanto Shite Rīshan!" (Japanese: シャンとしてリーシャン！)	March 13, 2008	August 16, 2008
The group meet a magician named Francesca and her three Chingling. Francesca is trying to get her spoiled Chingling to have a better attitude.
539	534	19	"Pokémon Ranger and the Kidnapped Riolu! Part 1" (Pokémon Ranger! Wave-Guiding Riolu!! [Part 1]); Transliteration: "Pokémon Renjā! Hadō no Rioru!! (Zenpen)" (Japanese: ポケモンレンジャー！波導のリオル！！（前編）)	March 20, 2008	November 1, 2008
Ash and his friends meet up with another Pokémon Ranger—Kellyn—and a Riolu. However, Pokémon Hunter J is also around and is aiming to kidnap Riolu for its Aura Sphere ability.
540	535	20	"Pokémon Ranger and the Kidnapped Riolu! Part 2" (Pokémon Ranger! Wave-Guiding Riolu!! [Part 2]); Transliteration: "Pokémon Renjā! Hadō no Rioru!! (Kōhen)" (Japanese: ポケモンレンジャー！波導のリオル！！（後編）)	March 20, 2008	November 8, 2008
Hunter J has kidnapped Riolu, but thanks to its Aura bonding with Ash, the group alongside Kellyn and Solana are here. However, J is more formidable than anyone could have anticipated.
541	536	21	"Crossing Paths" (Goodbye Dokukeiru!); Transliteration: "Sayonara Dokukeiru!" (Japanese: さよならドクケイル！)	April 3, 2008	August 23, 2008
Ash and Co. arrive at a lakeside Pokémon Center. Jessie's Dustox sees a shiny Dustox, and follows it to the lake. Jessie begins to realise that she doesn't want to make the same mistake she did for love when she was younger, and releases Dustox to go and be with the one it loves.
542	537	22	"Pika and Goliath!" (Pikachu! Raichu! The Road to Evolution!!); Transliteration: "Pikachū! Raichū! Shinka e no Michi!!" (Japanese: ピカチュウ！ライチュウ！進化への道！！)	April 3, 2008	August 30, 2008
Ash and his friends meet Sho, a boy who has a Pichu and a Raichu and is aiming to want a Pikachu for his collection. However, after Pikachu gets badly injured by Raichu, Ash begins to wonder if he should change his mind about Pikachu evolving into a Raichu.
543	538	23	"Our Cup Runneth Over!" (The Contest Master Mikuri Appears!!); Transliteration: "Kontesuto Masutā, Mikuri Tōjō!!" (Japanese: コンテストマスター・ミクリ登場！！)	April 17, 2008	September 6, 2008
Ash, Brock and Dawn meet Wallace, the Hoenn League Champion and Top Coordinator, who is in Sinnoh to host the Wallace Cup, a contest event where the main prize is a ribbon that can be used in any region.
544	539	24	"A Full Course Tag Battle!" (Seven Stars Restaurant! Tag Battle for a Full Course!!); Transliteration: "Resutoran Nanatsuboshi! Taggu Batoru de Furukōsu!!" (Japanese: レストラン七つ星！タッグバトルでフルコース！！)	April 24, 2008	September 13, 2008
May has travelled to Sinnoh for the Wallace Cup, and reunites with Ash and Brock, while gaining a new friend in Dawn. They visit the Seven Stars Restaurant, they find out that only those who win a tag-battle against the restaurant's owners can eat there.
545	540	25	"Staging a Heroes' Welcome!" (Everyone's a Rival! Mikuri Cup!!); Transliteration: "Minna Raibaru! Mikuri Kappu!!" (Japanese: みんなライバル！ミクリカップ！！)	May 8, 2008	September 20, 2008
It's the first day of the Wallace Cup, and everyone is ready. The group meet up with Zoey again, while Ash's old friend May meets her for the first time. However, Dawn is still worried if she is still able to regain her confidence in Contests.
546	541	26	"Pruning a Passel of Pals!" (Fierce Fighting! Respective Battles!!); Transliteration: "Gekitō! Sorezore no Batoru!!" (Japanese: 激闘！それぞれのバトル！！)	May 8, 2008	September 27, 2008
The Wallace Cup continues on with Dawn, May and Zoey all winning their battles, while Ash is knocked out of the contest by a coordinator named Kyle. Earlier on in the night, Ash discovers a mysterious glow in Lake Valor, the same one Dawn discovered on the beginning of her journey at Lake Verity.
547	542	27	"Strategy with a Smile!" (Decisive Match! Hikari vs. Haruka!!); Transliteration: "Kessen! Hikari Tai Haruka!!" (Japanese: 決戦！ヒカリVSハルカ！！)	May 15, 2008	October 11, 2008
With Dawn defeating Kyle and May defeating Zoey in the semifinals, Dawn and May are pitted against each other in the Wallace Cup Finals, but who will win the Aqua Ribbon?
548	543	28	"The Thief That Keeps on Thieving!" (Yanyanma! The Capture Operation!); Transliteration: "Yanyanma! Getto Sakusen!!" (Japanese: ヤンヤンマ！ゲット作戦！！)	May 22, 2008	October 18, 2008
On their way to Pastoria City, Ash and friends meet a trainer named Tyler that wants to catch a Yanma. However, just as Tyler is about to catch it, Jessie ends up capturing it for herself to give to Giovanni. Giovanni returns it to her and it evolves into Yanmega.
549	544	29	"Chim-Charred!" (The Scorching Hikozaru!); Transliteration: "Shakunetsu no Hikozaru!" (Japanese: 灼熱のヒコザル！)	May 29, 2008	October 25, 2008
The group run into Paul again, and Ash challenges him to a battle. During the battle, Chimchar activates its Blaze ability and goes berserk and uncontrollable! Ash realises he must find a way to control it.
550	545	30	"Cream of the Croagunk Crop!" (The Gregguru Festival of the Nomose Great Marsh!?); Transliteration: "Nomose Shitsugen no Guregguru Matsuri!?" (Japanese: ノモセ大湿原のグレッグル祭り！？)	June 5, 2008	November 15, 2008
The gang arrive in Pastoria City, and with Crasher Wake, the Gym Leader, they discover the Croagunk Festival in the Pastoria Great Marsh.
551	546	31	"A Crasher Course in Power!" (Nomose Gym! Vs. Maximum Mask!!); Transliteration: "Nomose Jimu! Tai Makishimamu Kamen!!" (Japanese: ノモセジム！VSマキシマム仮面！！)	June 19, 2008	November 22, 2008
Ash challenges Crasher Wake for the Fen Badge. However, earlier on, Buizel and Pikachu get into a quarrel after Pikachu accidentally attacks him.
552	547	32	"Hungry for the Good Life!" (The Gluttonous Urimoo at Mr. Urayama's!!); Transliteration: "Urayama-sanchi no Ōgui Urimū!" (Japanese: ウラヤマさんちの大食いウリムー！)	July 3, 2008	December 6, 2008
The group visit Mr. Backlot's Mansion, where a Swinub shows up and starts to eat all the Poffins. Dawn ends up catching the Swinub.
553	548	33	"Fighting Fear with Fear!" (Gligar! Wings of Friendship!!); Transliteration: "Guraigā! Yūjō no Tsubasa!!" (Japanese: グライガー！友情の翼！！)	July 3, 2008	December 13, 2008
Ash's Gligar is still emotional in battling after Paul's Gliscor defeated him. Meanwhile, they bump into Gary, who gives Ash a Razor Fang to allow Gligar to evolve into Gliscor in the night.
554	549	34	"Arriving in Style!" (Yosuga Collection! The Road to Becoming a Pokémon Stylist!!); Transliteration: "Yosuga Korekushon! Pokémon Sutairisuto e no Michi!!" (Japanese: ヨスガコレクション！ポケモンスタイリストへの道！！)	July 10, 2008	December 20, 2008
The group return to Harthome City, but the Gym Leader is still gone. Immediately after, they meet Paris, a Pokémon Stylist, and her Lopunny. She suggests that Dawn should enter the Hearthome Collection, a famous fashion show.
555	550	35	"The Psyduck Stops Here!" (The Koduck Roadblock!); Transliteration: "Kodakku no Tōsenbo!" (Japanese: コダックの通せんぼ！)	July 24, 2008	December 27, 2008
While traveling through a deep valley, Ash and friends encounter a swarm of Psyduck in the middle of a road, who begin to attack the group.
556	551	36	"Camping it Up!" (The Pokémon Summer School Course!!); Transliteration: "Pokémon Samāsukūru Kaikō!!" (Japanese: ポケモンサマースクール開講！！)	August 7, 2008	January 3, 2009
Professor Rowan invites the group to the Pokémon Summer Academy. Ash meets a fellow trainer named Angie, who both start a rivalry. Meanwhile, Dawn meets up with Conway again, and Jessie also joins the students, disguised as "Jessalinda", who ends up forgetting the proper reason why she, James and Meowth are at the Academy. The first and second days focus on training a Pokémon.
557	552	37	"Up Close and Personable!" (Research Presentation: "Legend of the Lake"!); Transliteration: "Kenkyū Happyō, Mizuumi no Densetsu!'" (Japanese: 研究発表「湖の伝説」！)	August 14, 2008	January 10, 2009
For the third day of the Pokémon Summer Academy, the students must observe Water-Type Pokémon. Meanwhile, Ash, Dawn, Brock, Angie, and Conway find that their Pokémon are becoming hypnotized.
558	553	38	"Ghoul Daze!" (It's Ghost Time After School!); Transliteration: "Hōkago ha Gōsuto Taimu!?" (Japanese: 放課後はゴーストタイム！？)	August 21, 2008	January 17, 2009
For the fifth day of activities at the Summer Academy, the students are taught how to deal with Ghost-Type Pokémon, should they ever run into them. They are then paired up to find a hidden treasure. While searching, Conway has a run-in with a Dusknoir, as well as a malevolent spirit bent on dragging innocents into the Spirit World.
559	554	39	"One Team, Two Team, Red Team, Blue Team!" (The Final Showdown! Pokémon Triathlon!); Transliteration: "Saigo no Daishōbu! Pokémon Toraiasuron!" (Japanese: 最後の大勝負！ポケモントライアスロン！)	August 28, 2008	January 24, 2009
The final day of the Summer Academy is none other than a Pokémon Triathlon, where the students must use various Pokémon to bring them across a rigorous track to the finish line.
560	555	40	"A Lean Mean Team Rocket Machine!" (Back to Basics, Team Rocket!?); Transliteration: "Genten Kaiki da Roketto-Dan!?" (Japanese: 原点回帰だロケット団！？)	September 4, 2008	January 31, 2009
Team Rocket get into a harsh training program after they get overstuffed at an All You Can Eat restaurant that ends up causing them to lose their nastiness. Meanwhile, Ash and his friends take Piplup to the Pokémon Center after collapsing from over-excessive training.
561	556	41	"Playing the Leveling Field!" (The Dancing Gym Leader! Melissa Appears!!); Transliteration: "Odoru Jimu Rīdā! Merissa Tōjō!!" (Japanese: 踊るジムリーダー！メリッサ登場！！)	September 11, 2008	February 7, 2009
After waiting for a long time, Ash and the gang meet Fantina, the Hearthome City Gym Leader, and also meet up with Zoey again. Ash has an unofficial battle with Fantina, where Drifloon's Hypnosis move causes trouble for him.
562	557	42	"Doc Brock!" (Pachirisu Has a Fever! Being Two People Taking Care!?); Transliteration: "Pachirisu o Netsu desu! Futari de Orusuban!?" (Japanese: パチリスお熱です！2人でお留守番！？)	September 25, 2008	February 14, 2009
When Brock goes off to do an errand, Ash and Dawn have their own predicament when Pachirisu suffers from overloaded electricity and gets ill.
563	558	43	"Battling the Generation Gap!" (Pokémon Contest! Kannagi Tournament!!); Transliteration: "Pokémon Kontesuto! Kannagi Taikai!!" (Japanese: ポケモンコンテスト！カンナギ大会！！)	September 25, 2008	February 21, 2009
The Celestic Town Pokémon Contest is being held, and Dawn meets her mother's old rival Lila, making her first appearance in contests in two decades. Lila reveals that she chose to leave Contests and become a Pokémon Stylist upon consultation with Johanna, though seeing Dawn's victory in the Wallace Cup inspired her to return to Contests one more time in hopes of earning her fifth ribbon.
564	559	44	"Losing Its Lustrous!" (Team Galaxy Attacks!! [Part 1]); Transliteration: "Ginga-Dan Shūgeki!! (Zenpen)" (Japanese: ギンガ団襲撃！！（前編）)	October 2, 2008	February 28, 2009
Team Galactic has successfully stolen the Adamant Orb, and are now aiming to obtain the Lustrous Orb as well. Meanwhile, the gang meet up with the Champion of the Sinnoh Region Cynthia and her grandmother, Professor Carolina, the head of the institute, as well as Cyrus, a wealthy business mogul. Ash and Dawn soon discover that the mysterious Pokémon shadows in the lake belong to the Legendary Pokémon, Mesprit, the Being of Emotion, and Azelf, the Being of Willpower. She and Carolina also discuss the third member of the trio: Uxie, the Being of Knowledge, said to live in Lake Acuity near Snowpoint City.
565	560	45	"Double Team Turnover!" (Team Galaxy Attacks!! [Part 2]); Transliteration: "Ginga-Dan Shūgeki!! (Kōhen)" (Japanese: ギンガ団襲撃！！（後編）)	October 2, 2008	March 7, 2009
Team Rocket escapes with the Lustrous Orb, but Team Galactic are soon after them, alongside Cyrus, who in reality, is the leader of Team Galactic, and is after the orbs to summon Dialga and Palkia and create a new world.
566	561	46	"If the Scarf Fits, Wear It!" (The Floating Unidentified Mysterious Monster!?); Transliteration: "Ukabu Mikakunin Kaibutsu!?" (Japanese: 浮かぶ未確認怪物！？)	October 16, 2008	March 21, 2009
Arriving back in Solaceon Town, the gang meet up with Angie at her parents' Daycare Center. Ash and the gang tell her about the strange monster terrorizing Solaceon Town. Angie later reveals that the monster is a Lickilicky that she evolved from a Lickitung left at the center that she accidentally taught Rollout. So, the gang goes out and helps her find the Lickilicky and bring it back.
567	562	47	"A Trainer and Child Reunion!" (Elite Four Ryou! Forest of Meeting and Separation!); Transliteration: "Shitennō Ryō! Deai to Wakare no Mori!" (Japanese: 四天王リョウ！出会いと別れの森！)	October 23, 2008	March 28, 2009
As Ash and the gang continue back to Hearthome City, they encounter Aaron, a member of the Elite Four, holding a public training session with his Bug-type Pokémon in preparation for an upcoming battle with Cynthia. Taking the group to his house, Aaron explains his history with Bug-type Pokémon, along with the story of a Wurmple he befriended but released after an argument. The gang offers to help Aaron look for his released Wurmple.
568	563	48	"Aiding the Enemy!" (Naetoru, Hayashigame... and Dodaitosu!); Transliteration: "Naetoru, Hayashigame... Soshite Dodaitosu!" (Japanese: ナエトル、ハヤシガメ…そしてドダイトス！)	October 30, 2008	April 4, 2009
Ash encounters Paul again, with an argument leading to a one-on-one battle, with Paul choosing his Honchkrow, and Ash choosing Turtwig. However, Turtwig evolves into Grotle, he loses all its agility and loses. At night, Paul's Torterra shows up and comforts Grotle by showing it that speed isn't everything about battles.
569	564	49	"Barry's Busting Out All Over!" (Rival Trainer Jun Appears!!); Transliteration: "Raibaru Torēnā, Jun Tōjō!!" (Japanese: ライバルトレーナー・ジュン登場！！)	November 6, 2008	April 11, 2009
Upon arriving at the Hearthome Gym, Ash and his friends run into Barry, a trainer from Twinleaf Town. Barry turns out to be an admirer of Paul, whom he saw when watching the Hearthome Tag Battle Tournament.
570	565	50	"Shield with a Twist!" (Yosuga Gym Match! Vs. Melissa!!); Transliteration: "Yosuga Jimu Sen! Tai Merissa!!" (Japanese: ヨスガジム戦！VSメリッサ！！)	November 13, 2008	April 18, 2009
The Gym battle between Ash and the Hearthome Gym Leader Fantina has begun. Can Ash's counter-shield strategy defeat Fantina's Pokémon, including her now-evolved Drifblim?
571	566	51	"Jumping Rocket Ship!" (Chaotic Melee in Mio City!); Transliteration: "Kōsen Konran Mio Shiti!" (Japanese: 混戦混乱ミオシティ！)	November 20, 2008	April 25, 2009
After a failed Team Rocket plot to steal the group's Pokémon, they are blown away into the sky in the process and all get separated. When Meowth is grouped with Pikachu, Pachirisu, and Mime Jr. after the explosion, he considers leaving Team Rocket for good.
572	567	52	"Sleepless in Pre-Battle!" (Cresselia vs. Darkrai!); Transliteration: "Kureseria Tai Darkurai!" (Japanese: クレセリアVSダークライ！)	December 4, 2008	May 2, 2009
The group reach Canalave City, and find out that all the people in the city are having nightmares, and that Darkrai may have something to do with it. In order to remedy the situation, the group and Jenny travel to Fullmoon Island to meet with the Legendary Pokémon Cresselia, who has the power to awaken those suffering from Darkrai's nightmares. However, they all discover Team Rocket are to blame for the situation in order to steal Cresselia. Dawn's Swinub evolves into Piloswine.

== Music ==
The Japanese opening songs are "Together" for 26 episodes, and "Together 2008" for 17 episodes by Fumie Akiyoshi, and "High Touch!" (ハイタッチ!, Hai Tatchi!) by Rica Matsumoto and Megumi Toyoguchi for 9 episodes. The ending songs are "By Your Side 〜Hikari's Theme〜 (Winter. Version)" (君のそばで 〜ヒカリのテーマ〜 Winter. Version, Kimi no Soba de 〜Hikari no Tēma〜 Winter. Version) by Grin for 9 episodes, "Message of the Wind" (風のメッセージ, Kaze no Messēji) for 23 episodes, and "Message of the Wind (POKAPOKA-VERSION.)" (風にメッセージ POKAPOKA-VERSION., Kaze no Messēji POKAPOKA-VERSION.) for 11 episodes by Mai Mizuhashi, "Surely Tomorrow" (あしたはきっと, Ashita wa Kitto) by Kanako Yoshii for 9 episodes, and the English opening song is "We Will Be Heroes" by Kirsten Price. Its instrumental version served as the end credit song.

== Home media releases ==
The series was released on six volume DVDs by Viz Media and Warner Home Video in the United States, which were released separately and as part of two boxsets. This was the first Pokémon DVD released in the United States after Viz's new home video partnership with Warner.

Viz Media and Warner Home Video released Pokémon the Series Diamond and Pearl: Battle Dimension – The Complete Season on DVD on January 7, 2020.
