= Sharron Levy =

Israeli singer-songwriter (born 1977)

Sharron Levy (Hebrew: שרון לוי; born 17 November 1977) is a singer-songwriter originally from Israel. In 2011, she reached the semi-finals of the German television show The Voice of Germany. Originally, she was established as a rock singer in the band Super Massive Object and later in Captive Audio.

== Early life ==
Sharron Levy was born in Haifa in Israel and grew up in Tel Aviv. At the age of nine she moved with her mother and brother to London, England. After attending a Jewish primary school in London, she went on to a Jewish boarding school, Carmel College in Oxfordshire, where she stayed until the age of sixteen.

Following Carmel College, Levy completed a performing arts course in Henley College and moved to Newcastle upon Tyne to study music production.

== Bands ==
Levy's first band was One Drop, an already established band searching for a singer. She spent two years with the band performing shows around the Newcastle area. One Drop's drummer, Andy Walker and Levy left One Drop to form a new band – Super Massive Object (SMO). SMO gave Levy a chance to write and perform her own songs and co-write with Walker. After four years and a number of line up changes, Super Massive Object split up.

A short while later Levy joined Anthony Bye (bass) and Paul Kirk (drums) who were seeking a singer. The trio became Captive Audio with Levy playing guitar and singing lead vocals. Captive Audio performed across the UK and recorded an album: Visceral. The band relocated to London to build on their growing success. The band split shortly after and the album was never released although some of the tracks are still available as free downloads on the band's website.

== Solo work ==
Levy's solo work started with a recording of an album with producer and songwriter Bryan Steele in 2009. However, this album was never released.

In July 2010 Levy recorded a 7 track EP Unplugged And Then Plugged In Again produced by herself and Anthony Bye. A limited 100 copies were made and the EP is now only available as download through Amazon, iTunes and other websites.

In August 2010 Levy relocated to Salzburg in Austria. There she performed regularly in Shamrock Irish Pub and was beginning to build a name for herself.

== The Voice of Germany ==
Levy auditioned for the casting show The Voice of Germany in July 2011. She attended the Munich auditions and was then invited to the "blind auditions" where she was selected into Nena's team. Levy qualified for the live shows where, in February 2012, she reached the semi-finals with the best eight participants. Her appearances on the show resulted in two minor hits in the German charts, one a cover, the other her own composition "Drowning". In September 2012 Sharron was supported by ex SMO drummer Jae Brooks and bass player Keith Mills on a 16 date tour of Germany.

== 2013 onwards ==
In 2013 Levy released her first album "Rough_Ready" which failed to chart. The album had contributions from several members of Nena's band, Levy being the support act at a number of Nena's concerts throughout 2013 and 2014. In October 2014, Levy released a new track, "Punk Thursday", as a precursor to her second solo album "I am me" which was eventually released in June 2018.
