= Guts & Garbage =

Studio album by Kirsten Price
- Released: October 19, 2007
- Genre: R&B, pop
- Length: 37:28
- Label: KPI
- Producer: Fred Sargolini; Raphael Saadiq; Danny Saber

Kirsten Price chronology
| Guts & Garbage (2007) | Brixton to Brooklyn (2010) |

Singles from Guts & Garbage
- 1. "Magic Tree" Released: January 16, 2007

Guts & Garbage is the debut full-length album by Kirsten Price, released on October 19, 2007. The album's single, "Magic Tree", was featured on Showtime's The L Word, and appeared on a compilation CD for that show.

== Track listing ==
1. "Magic Tree" – 3:24
2. "All Right" – 3:21
3. "Fall”– 3:10
4. "Crazy Beautiful" – 3:40
5. "5 Days Old" – 4:20
6. "Freedom" – 3:28
7. "Bring Me Back" – 3:27
8. "Let Me Go" – 4:07
9. "Red Hot" – 4:05
10. "Possibilities" – 4:31
