= Kirsten Price (musician) =

American singer-songwriter

- Born: Kirsten C. Price; 8 September 1979 (age 46); Islington, London, England
- Genres: R&B; soul; pop rock; pop
- Occupations: Singer-songwriter; musician; multi-instrumentalist; record producer
- Instruments: Vocals; guitar; bass guitar; piano; keyboard
- Years active: 2007–present
- Label: KPI
- Website: Official website

Kirsten Price (born 8 September 1979) is an English singer-songwriter, multi-instrumentalist, and producer. She released her first single "Magic Tree", from her debut album Guts & Garbage, in 2007. Subsequently, she released her next single, "With or Without You" and her second LP, Brixton to Brooklyn, in 2010.

== Early life ==
Price was born in Islington, London, where she received classical training playing piano and singing in various choirs. She moved to New York City in early September 2001.

== Career ==
Price was signed to Sony Records in 2007, and began recording Guts & Garbage. On that album she collaborated with Raphael Saadiq and Danny Saber. Following business complications with the label, Price took the initiative to form her own label, KPI, and released the album in 2008.

Around this time, Price recorded several covers and an original song for other commercial usage. In 2007, she recorded a cover of Simon & Garfunkel's "Feeling Groovy", which appeared in a Clinique commercial. In 2007, she recorded a cover of Stevie Wonder's "Sir Duke" for a Lee Jeans commercial.

In 2008, Price also recorded vocals for the opening track, "We Will Be Heroes", of the Pokémon DP: Battle Dimension television series, and the ending track, "I'll Always Remember You", for two Pokémon movies, The Rise of Darkrai and Arceus and the Jewel of Life.

Price collaborated on the production of Kidz Bop 15 in 2009, where she acted as vocal producer.

The single from the Guts & Garbage album, "Magic Tree", was used by a number of major TV syndicates, such as Showtime and ABC. This single also appeared on a compilation album by Showtime.

In 2010, she released "With or Without You" as the lead single from her self-produced second album, Brixton to Brooklyn. Several songs from the album, including the single, have also been picked up for use on more network shows, such as on Oxygen's The Bad Girls Club, MTV's The City, and VH1's Mob Wives.

== Discography ==
=== Albums ===
- Guts & Garbage (2007)
- Brixton to Brooklyn (2010)

=== Singles ===
- "Magic Tree" (2007)
- "With or Without You" (2010)

== Tours ==
=== Headlining ===
- 2009: Tough Times '09 Tour
