= Ivy Quainoo =

German singer (born 1992)

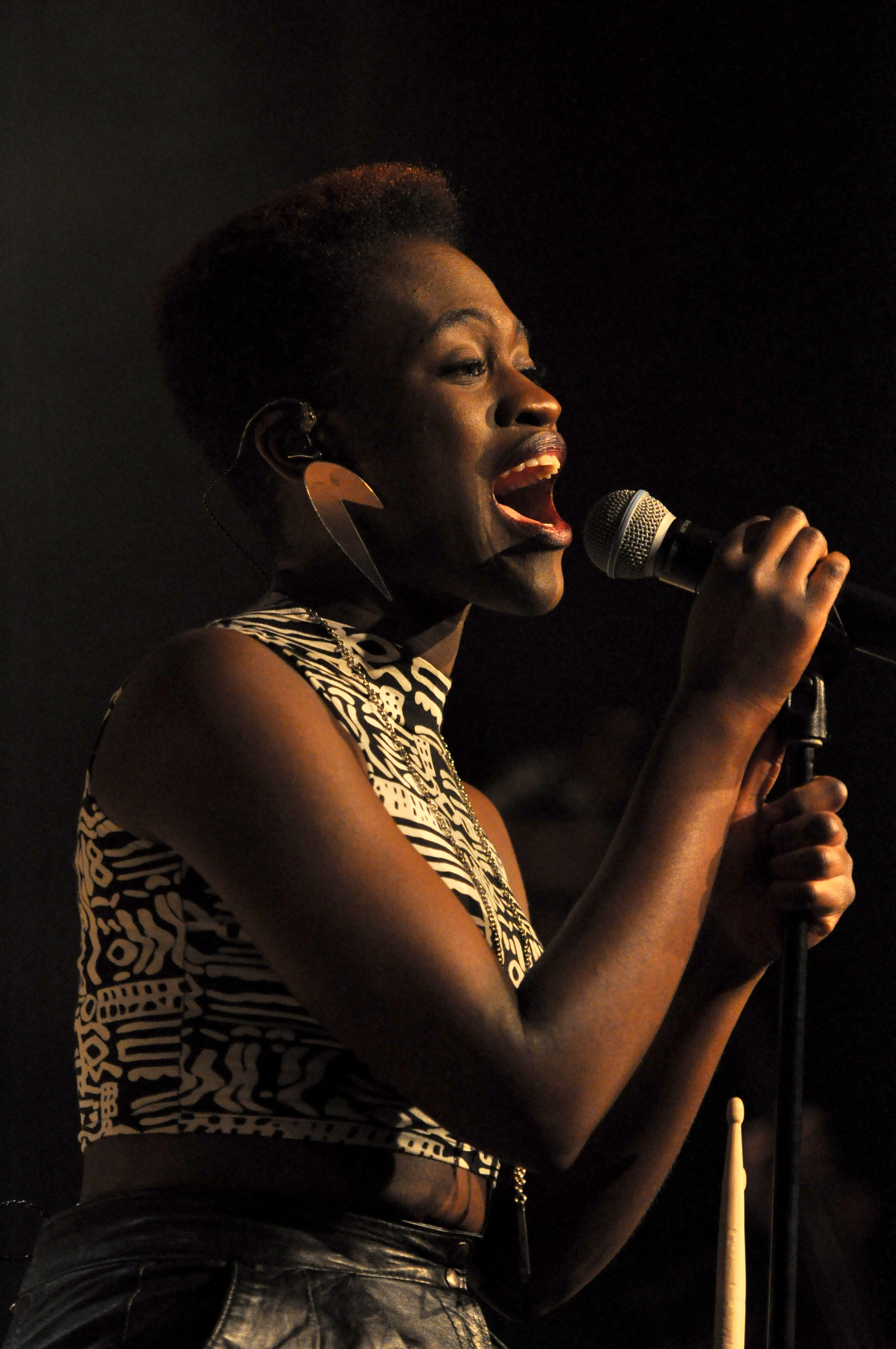
- Quainoo in concert in Cologne, January 2014

Background information
- Born: 25 August 1992 (age 34); Berlin, Germany
- Genres: Pop, power pop, pop rock
- Years active: 2012–present

Ivy Quainoo (born 25 August 1992) is a German singer. In February 2012, she won the first series of The Voice of Germany. In December 2017, it was announced that she would be one of six competing entrants in Unser Lied für Lissabon, the German national final for Eurovision Song Contest 2018.

== Early life ==
Ivy Quainoo was born in Berlin-Neukölln to Ghanaian parents. She attended the Schiller High School in Charlottenburg. While still in school and also after her Abitur in 2011, she attended a dramatic arts school in Kreuzberg. In the summer of 2011, Ivy was featured as a background singer in writer/singer Jakob Royal's self-titled debut album.

After finishing high school, she auditioned for the reality talent show The Voice of Germany. During the live broadcasts, Quainoo was the only participant of the series to be voted in every time by the spectators. During the finals show on February 10, 2012, she received 33.65% of the combined votes, based on telephone voting and the number of song downloads, with which she left the other three final candidates behind.

== Career ==
=== 2012: Ivy ===
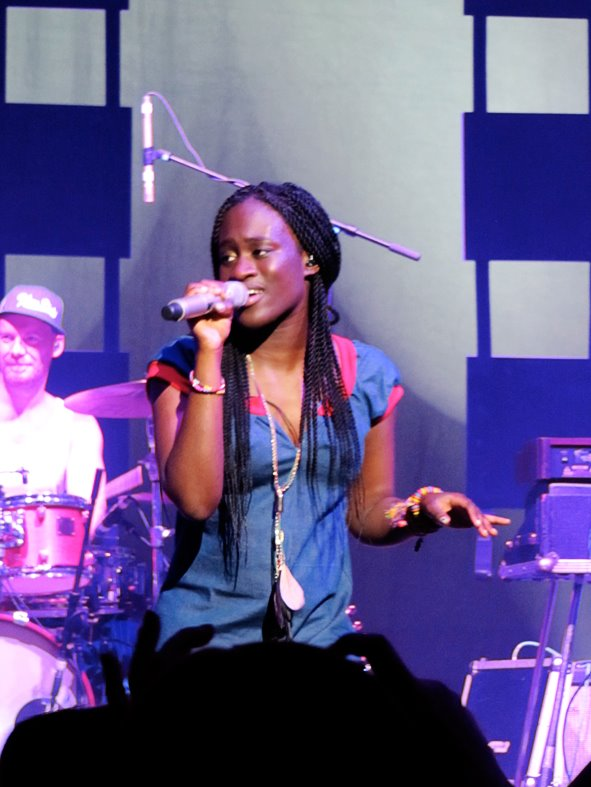
Ivy Quainoo in concert in Stuttgart, May 2012

After the final show, she promoted her single "Do You Like What You See?" on the Harald Schmidt Show and on Verstehen Sie Spaß?. Her first album, entitled Ivy, was released in March 2012. At the Echo award ceremony she sang, together with Aura Dione, Caro Emerald, Ina Müller and Dionne Bromfield, the song "Valerie" in memory of Amy Winehouse. Furthermore, Quainoo presented her second single "You Got Me" on ProSieben Celebrity Boxing. On 14 May 2012, she started her first tour of Germany with a concert in Lüneburg. On the final show of Germany's Next Topmodel Quainoo sang her single "Break Away". In October 2012, Quainoo worked with Mousse T. on a song for the movie Man tut was Mann kann. She also recorded the Song "Who You Are" with Stanfour for the mini-series World Without End. On November 16, she released her album Ivy as a Gold Edition in which these new songs are available.

=== 2013–present: Wildfires & film debut ===
Quainoo has been working on her second studio album in New York City, London & Los Angeles. In June, Quainoo stated that the album is finished and will be published in fall 2013. The album called Wildfires which was revealed some days later. On 6 September 2013, the first single "Wildfires (Light it Up)" from her second studio album was released. To promote the single and the album Wildfires, Quainoo performed at Schlag den Raab, Promi Big Brother and also having several radio interviews round the release dates. The album Wildfires was released on 27 September 2013. In October Quainoo is a special guest on Olly Murs Germany tour dates. Her next solo tour started in January 2014 and was called Wildfires Live Tour.

In 2015, Ivy Quainoo announced that she was focusing on an acting career by making her small film debut in the upcoming sequel Captain America: Civil War. She later played a High Table operator in John Wick: Chapter 4 and Downtown Julie Brown in the Milli Vanilli docudrama Girl You Know It's True.

== Other ventures ==
Ivy Quainoo filmed commercial spots for VW in 2012. Since February 2013 she is the ambassador of the German campaign Together for Africa. In June 2013, Quainoo walked as a model for the Berlin Fashion Week.

== Discography ==
=== Albums ===
Title	Details	Peak chart positions			Certifications
Title	Details	GER	AUT	SWI	Certifications
Ivy	Released: 13 February 2012; Label: EMI, Virgin Records; Formats: CD, digital download	5	11	10	GER: Gold
Wildfires	Released: 27 September 2013; Label: EMI, Virgin Records; Formats: CD, digital download	40	—	—	

=== Singles ===
Title	Year	Peak chart positions			Certifications	Album
Title	Year	GER	AUT	SWI	Certifications	Album
"Do You Like What You See"	2012	2	8	12	GER: Gold	Ivy
"You Got Me"	2012	31	61	61		Ivy
"Who You Are" (with Stanfour)	2012	49	—	—		Ivy
"Wildfires (Light It Up)"	2013	44	—	—		Wildfires
"Atomic"	2013	—	—	—		Wildfires
"House on Fire"	2018	—	—	—		Non-album single

== Awards and nominations ==
Year	Ceremony	Category	Work	Result
2012	CMA Wild and Young Awards	Best Album	Ivy	Nominated
2012	CMA Wild and Young Awards	Best Song	"Do You Like What You See"	Nominated
2012	CMA Wild and Young Awards	Best Newcomer	Herself	Nominated
2012	Napster Award	Favorite Shooting-Star	Herself	Nominated
2013	ECHO Awards	Best National Newcomer	Herself	Nominated
2013	ECHO Awards	Best Female National Artist	Herself	Won
2013	Napster Award	Favorite Shooting–Star	Herself	Nominated
2013	Radio 7 Award	Best Newcomer	Herself	Won

== Tours ==
Headlining

- 2012: Ivy Quainoo Tour
- 2014: Wildfires Live Tour

Opening act

- 2013: Right Place Right Time Tour

Awards and achievements
Preceded by N/A	The Voice of Germany Winner; 2011-12	Succeeded by Nick Howard
