= Charlee =

Austrian electropop singer (born 1993)

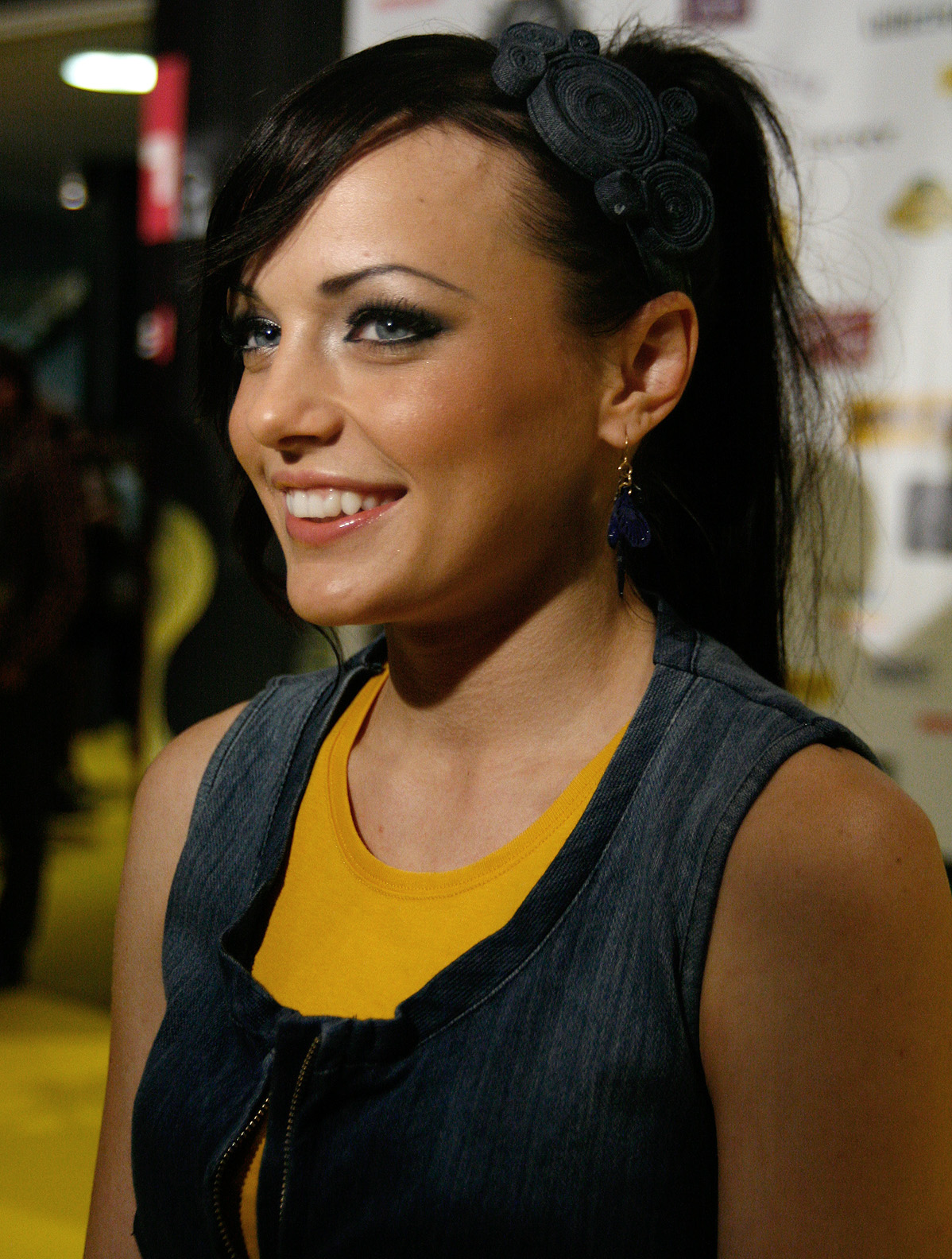
- Charlee in 2010

Background information
- Also known as: Charlee
- Born: Vera Luttenberger; 28 January 1993 (age 33); Feldbach, Styria, Austria
- Genre: Electropop
- Occupation: Singer
- Years active: 2010–present
- Labels: Polydor Records; Gaylo Records; Universal Music GMBH

Vera Luttenberger (born 28 January 1993), known professionally as Charlee, is an Austrian electropop singer.

== Career ==
At the age of 14, she signed with Universal and started working on her debut album, This Is Me, which was produced by Hubert Molander. The first single, "Boy Like You", a song co-written by the American pop singer and songwriter Kesha, was released in August 2010.

Charlee participated in the Austrian selection for the Eurovision Song Contest 2011, where she sang the song "Good to Be Bad" (her second single) and finished in eighth place. Later in 2011, she released her third single, "Obvious".

On 29 April 2011, Charlee released her debut album, This Is Me.

She took part in a German casting show called The Voice of Germany, but was eliminated in the "Battles". On 24 December 2011, Charlee released an EP called This Is Now, which could be downloaded for free on her homepage.

== Discography ==
=== Albums ===
Year	Title
2011	This Is Me

=== Extended plays ===
Year	Title
2012	This Is Now

=== Singles ===
Year	Title	Peak chart positions		Album
Year	Title	AUT	GER	Album
2010	"Boy Like You"	16	86	This Is Me
2011	"Good to Be Bad" (Eurovision 2011)	54	—	This Is Me
2011	"Obvious"	—	—	This Is Me
