= Brixton to Brooklyn =

Studio album by Kirsten Price
- Released: September 7, 2010
- Genres: R&B, pop
- Length: 29:54
- Label: KPI
- Producer: Kirsten Price

Kirsten Price chronology
Guts & Garbage (2007)	Brixton to Brooklyn (2010)

Singles from Brixton to Brooklyn
- 1. "With or Without You" Released: August 2, 2010

Brixton to Brooklyn is the second full-length album by Kirsten Price, released on September 7, 2010. The album's single, "With or Without You", was featured on Oxygen's The Bad Girls Club, MTV's The City, and VH1's Mob Wives.

== Track listing ==
1. "With or Without You" – 3:38
2. "Moving On" – 3:32
3. "Give That Girl”– 2:47
4. "Broken" – 3:38
5. "Take Me to the Top" – 3:27
6. "Gone" – 3:16
7. "Let your Light Shine" – 3:18
8. "One More Time" – 3:13
9. "Press That Button" – 3:04
