= You Got Me (Ivy Quainoo song) =

Single by Ivy Quainoo

from the album Ivy
- Released: 3 February 2012
- Recorded: 2012
- Genre: Soul; pop
- Length: 3:02
- Label: Universal Music
- Songwriter(s): S. Mones; J. Forster; S. Granger
- Producer(s): Marek Pompetzki; Paul NZA; Cecil Remmler

Ivy Quainoo singles chronology
"Do You Like What You See" (2012)	"You Got Me" (2012)	"Who You Are" (2012)

"You Got Me" is a single by German singer Ivy Quainoo. It was released as a digital download in Germany on June 7, 2012 as the second single from her debut studio album Ivy (2012). The song was written by S. Mones, J. Forster, S. Granger and produced by Marek Pompetzki, Paul NZA, Cecil Remmler.

== Track listing ==
Digital download
No.	Title	Length
1.	"You Got Me" (Single Version)	3:02
2.	"You Got Me" (Stick-e Beatz Remix)	2:49
3.	"You Got Me" (Acoustic Version)	2:59
4.	"Not a Lady" (Hotelroom Demo)	1:46
5.	"You Got Me" (Music Video)	3:02

== Credits and personnel ==
- Lead vocals – Ivy Quainoo
- Producers – Marek Pompetzki, Paul NZA, Cecil Remmler
- Lyrics – S. Mones, J. Forster, S. Granger
- Label: Universal Music

== Chart performance ==
=== Weekly charts ===
Chart (2012)	Peak position
Austria (Ö3 Austria Top 40)	61
Germany (GfK)	31
Switzerland (Schweizer Hitparade)	61

== Release history ==
Region	Date	Format	Label
Germany	7 June 2012	Digital download	Universal Music
