= The BossHoss =

German band

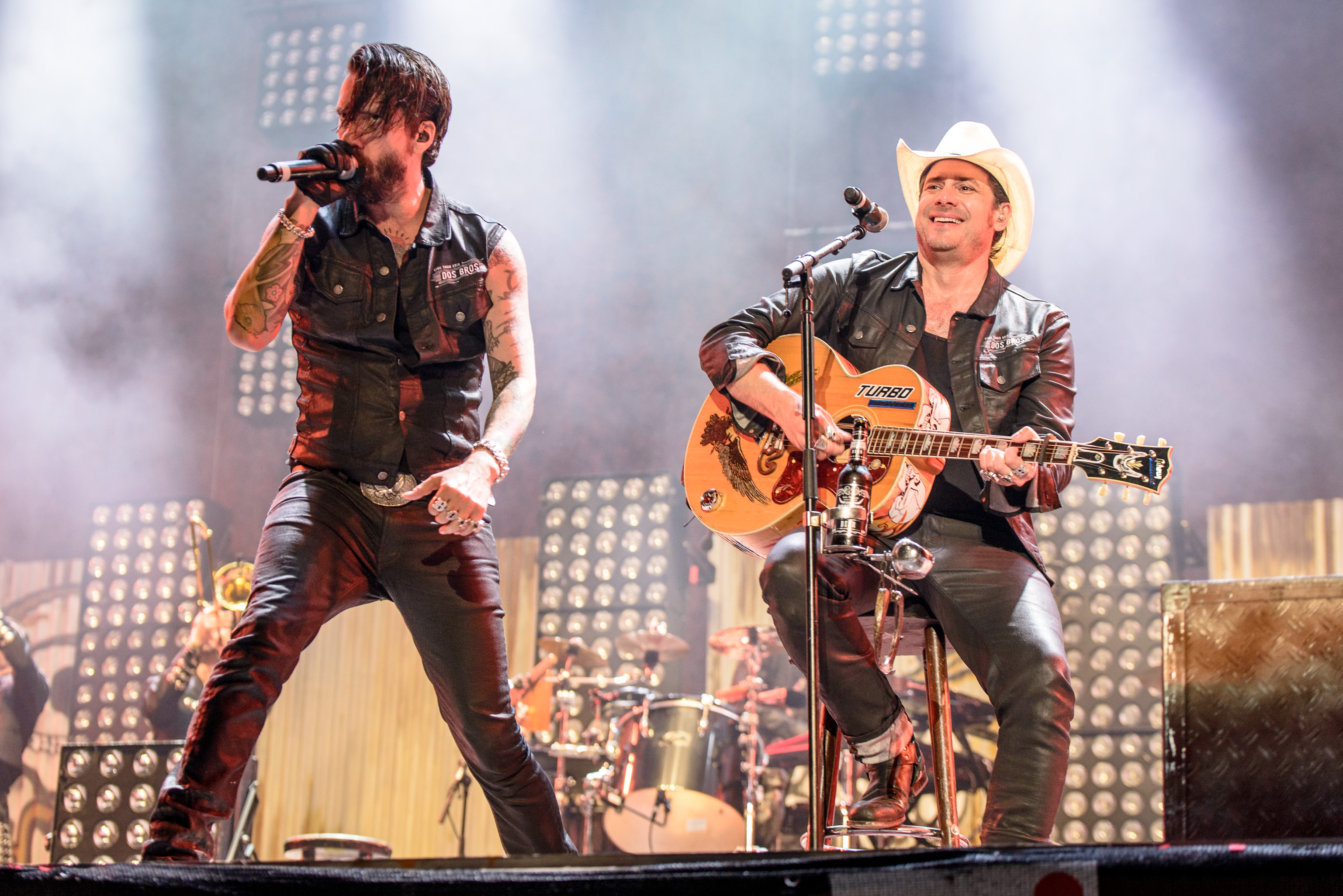
- The Boss Hoss at Rock im Park 2016

Background information
- Origin: Berlin, Germany
- Genres: Country rock, pop, rock
- Years active: 2004–present
- Members: Alec "Boss Burns" Völkel; Sascha "Hoss Power" Vollmer; Malcom "Hank Williamson" Arison Ansgar "Sir Frank Doe" Freyberg; André "Guss Brooks" Neumann; Tobias "Ernesto Escobar de Tijuana" Fischer
- Past members: Michael Frick; Mathias "Hank Doodle" Fauvet; Dean "Russ T. Nail" Micetech

The BossHoss is a German band from Berlin, founded in 2004. They originally started with country and western style cover versions of famous pop, rock and hip hop songs, for example "Hot in Herre" by Nelly, "Toxic" by Britney Spears and "Hey Ya!" by Outkast. They incorporate stereotypical American cowboy behavior into their act; they wear Stetson hats, tank tops and large sunglasses, and display whiskey bottles. The band refers to their music style as "Country Trash Punk Rock."

== Band history ==
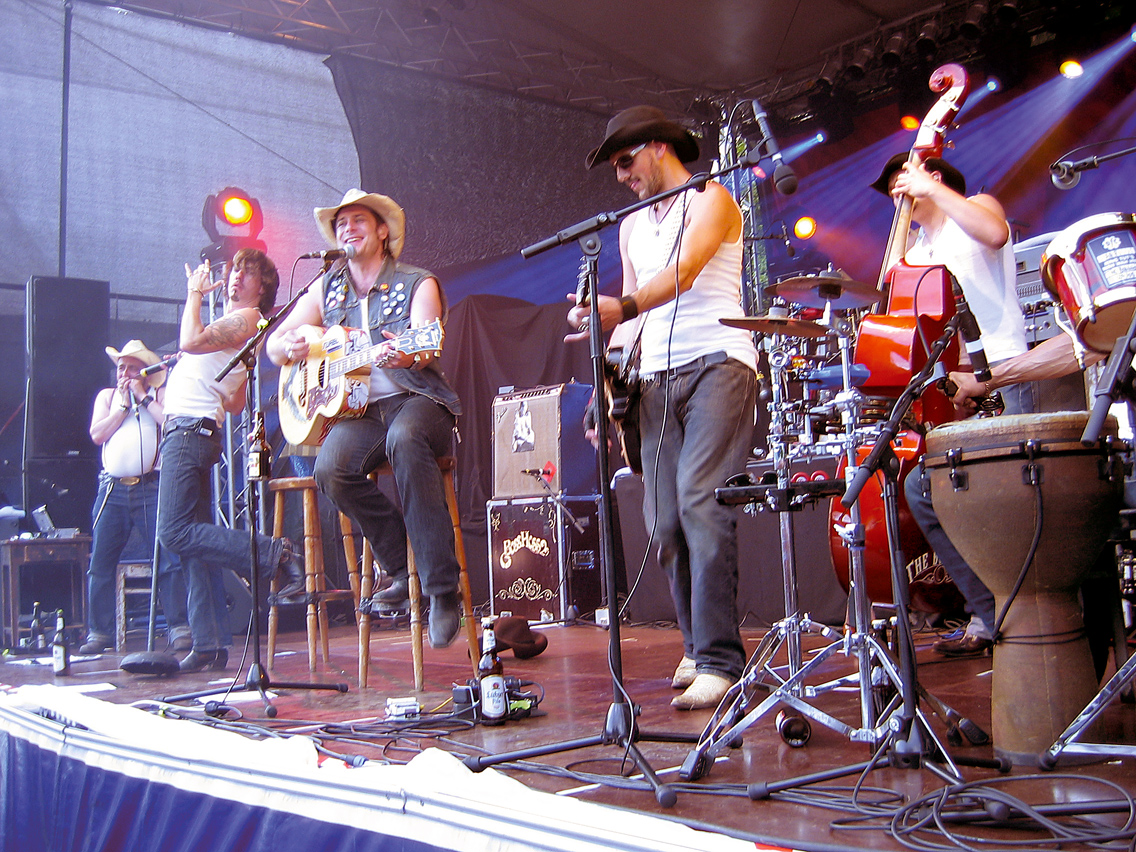
The Boss Hoss in concert in Germany on 16 June 2007

The band was formed in 2004 in Berlin by Alec "Boss" Völkel, Sascha "Hoss" Vollmer and Michael Frick, and named after the song "The Real BossHoss" by The Sonics. They were featured in the trendsetting music show Tracks (on French/German TV channel ARTE) and played live during the Kiel Week. In late 2004, they signed a record deal with Universal Music Domestic Division.

In 2005, they released their debut album Internashville Urban Hymns and signed a promotional contract with ice cream producer Langnese, for which they covered "Like Ice in the Sunshine", the theme song from a Langnese's TV spot. The band played about 180 concerts that year. In 2005, they adapted "Ca plane pour moi" from Belgian artist Plastic Bertrand.

In 2006, BossHoss provided the soundtrack for the football film FC Venus. Release of the first single "I Say a Little Prayer" on April 28 and the second album "Rodeo Radio" on May 19. Half of that second album were their own songs, the other half cover versions. After they had released the second album, their first album rose into the charts again, sold 100,000 copies by the end of May 2006, and became a gold record in Germany.

== Band members ==
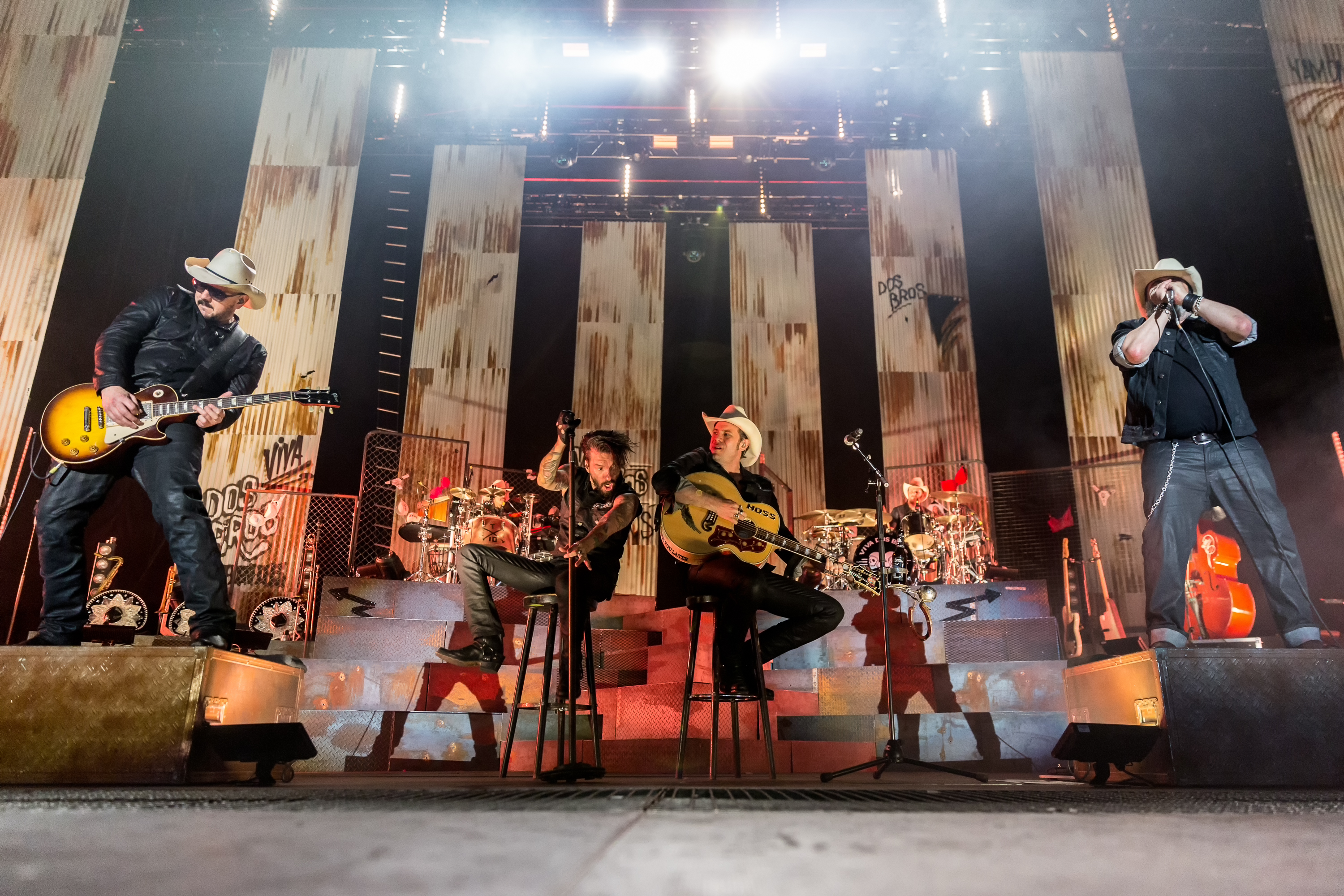
Part of the band in concert in Germany, 2016

- Boss Burns (Alec Völkel) - vocals, washboard
- Hoss Power (Sascha Vollmer) - acoustic and electric guitars, vocals
- Sir Frank Doe (Ansgar Freyberg) - drums
- Hank Williamson (Malcolm Arison) - mandoline, washboard, stylophone, harp
- Guss Brooks (André Neumann) - acoustic and electric basses
- Russ T. Rocket (Stefan Buehler) - electric guitar
- Ernesto Escobar de Tijuana (Tobias Fischer) - percussion, keytar, melodica

=== Past members ===
- Michael Frick - double bass
- Russ (Boris Kontorkowski) - electric guitar
- Russ T. Nail (Dean Micetech) - electric guitar
- Hank Doodle (Mathias Fauvet) - mandolin, washboard, harp

== Discography ==
=== Studio albums ===
| Year | Title | Peak positions | | | Release date and sales |
| Year | Title | GER | AUT | SWI | Release date and sales |
|---|---|---|---|---|---|
| 2005 | Internashville Urban Hymns | 11 (29 We.) | — | — | Released: 6 June 2005; Sales: 300,000+ |
| 2006 | Rodeo Radio | 6 (32 We.) | 40 (5 We.) | 83 (2 We.) | Released: 2 June 2006; Sales: 200,000+ |
| 2007 | Stallion Battalion | 8 (43 We.) | 56 (5 We.) | — | Released: 9. November 2007; Sales: 100,000+ |
| 2009 | Do or Die | 4 (16 We.) | 38 (6 We.) | 32 (10 We.) | Released: 3 July 2009; Sales: 100,000+ |
| 2010 | Low Voltage | 7 (5 We.) | 49 (1 We.) | 64 (1 We.) | Released: 30 April 2010 |
| 2011 | Liberty of Action | 4 (72 We.) | 3 (59 We.) | 26 (31 We.) | Released: 9 December 2011; Sales: 220,000+ |
| 2013 | Flames of Fame | 2 (26 We.) | 5 (13 We.) | 8 (17 We.) | Released: 11 October 2013; Sales: 15,000+ |
| 2015 | Dos Bros | 1 (67 We.) | 1 (33 We.) | 14 (34 We.) | Released: 25 September 2015; Sales: 207,500+ |
| 2018 | Black Is Beautiful | 1 (13 We.) | 8 (5 We.) | 14 (4 We.) | Released: 26 October 2018 |
| 2023 | Electric Horsemen | 7 (4 We.) | 26 (1 We.) | 17 (2 We.) | Released: 5 May 2023 |

Others

- Stallion Battalion live from Cologne (Released March 7, 2008) (Double-CD plus DVD)

=== Singles ===
| Year | Title | Peak positions | | | Release dates |
| Year | Title | GER | AUT | SWI | Release dates |
|---|---|---|---|---|---|
| 2005 | Hey Ya! Internashville Urban Hymns | 41 | — | — | Released: 9 May 2005 |
| 2005 | Hot in Herre / Like Ice in the Sunshine; Internashville Urban Hymns | 83 | — | — | Released: 25 July 2005 |
| 2006 | I Say a Little Prayer; Rodeo Radio / Low Voltage | 66 | — | — | Released: 12 May 2006 |
| 2006 | Ring Ring Ring; Rodeo Radio | 99 | — | — | Released: 1 September 2006 |
| 2006 | Rodeo Radio; Rodeo Radio / Low Voltage | 93 | — | — | Released: 29 December 2006 |
| 2007 | Everything Counts / Truck ’n’ Roll Rules; Stallion Battalion | 67 | — | — | Released: 15 June 2007 |
| 2009 | Last Day (Do or Die) | 78 | — | — | Released: 19 June 2009 |
| 2011 | Heroes/Helden; Die Highlights | 28 | 50 | — | Released: 24 November 2011 (with Nena, Xavier Naidoo and Rea Garvey) |
| 2011 | Don't Gimme That; Liberty of Action | 8 | 1 | 49 | Released: 25 November 2011; Sales: + 315,000 |
| 2011 | L.O.V.E. Liberty of Action | 74 | — | — | Released: 20 December 2011 (feat. Nena) |
| 2011 | My Country; Rammstein | — | — | — | Released: 11 November 2011 |
| 2012 | Live It Up; Liberty of Action | 98 | 52 | — | Released: 8 August 2012 |
| 2013 | Do It; Flames of Fame | 31 | 40 | 36 | Released: 16 September 2013 |
| 2015 | Dos Bros; Dos Bros | 33 | 72 | — | Released: 21 August 2015 |
| 2015 | Jolene; Dos Bros | 35 | 25 | 29 | Released: 25 December 2015 (feat. The Common Linnets) |
| 2019 | Little Help | 32 | 34 | 41 | Released: 3 May 2019 (featuring Mimi & Josy) |
| 2021 | Burning Love | — | — | — | Released: 2 January 2021 (feat. OnklP) |

Notes

- "Hey Ya!" is a cover of OutKast
- "Hot in Herre / Like Ice in the Sunshine" is a double A side single with covers of Nelly and the Langnese theme
- "Heroes/helden" is a remake of David Bowie's "Heroes"
- Christmas-CD contains a cover of "Last Christmas" by Wham! and "Riding Home for Christmas"
- "I Say a Little Prayer" is a Bacharach-David composition; side B is "You'll Never Walk Alone", a Rodgers-Hammerstein composition
- "Ring, Ring, Ring" is a cover of De La Soul

=== DVDs ===
- Internashville Urban Hymns, die DVDs (2005; available only in Germany)

== See also ==
The 2930s
