= Loved Me Back to Life =

Studio album by Celine Dion
- Released: 1 November 2013
- Recorded: 2012–2013
- Studios: Abbey Road, Eg White (London); Brandon's Way Recording, Chalice Recording, Newman Scoring Stage (Los Angeles); Echo Beach (Jupiter); Larrabee (North Hollywood); Oceanway, Top Floor Studios (Nashville); RMV (Stockholm); At the Palms (Las Vegas); Triangle Sound East (Atlanta); Triangle Sound West (Encino); WallyWorld (Burbank)
- Genre: Pop
- Length: 51:23
- Label: Columbia
- Producers: Walter Afanasieff; Babyface; D'Mile; Emanuel Kiriakou; Danny Mercer; Denarius Motes; Aaron Pearce; Play Production; Fraser T. Smith; Reginald Smith; Tricky Stewart; Eg White; Curtis Wilson; Jesse "Corparal" Wilson

Celine Dion chronology
Sans attendre (2012)	Loved Me Back to Life (2013)	Céline une seule fois / Live 2013 (2014)

Singles from Loved Me Back to Life
- 1. "Loved Me Back to Life" Released: 3 September 2013; 2. "Incredible" Released: 14 February 2014

Loved Me Back to Life is the twenty-fifth studio album and eleventh English-language album by Canadian singer Celine Dion, released by Columbia Records on 1 November 2013. Dion's first English-language studio album since Taking Chances (2007), it was produced by Babyface, Tricky Stewart, Eg White, Walter Afanasieff, and others, and initially developed in 2012 under the title Water and a Flame. Blending contemporary pop and R&B with selected Las Vegas covers, its release was delayed as Dion and her team shifted the album toward original material, and it was renamed Loved Me Back to Life in 2013.

The album received generally positive reviews from critics, with praise for Dion's willingness to explore contemporary pop, R&B, and dance influences while adopting a softer, more nuanced vocal style, though some critics felt that her attempts to sound more contemporary were occasionally unconvincing and criticized the album's formulaic ballads. Commercially, it was also highly successful, debuting at number one in Canada, number two in the United States, and number three in the United Kingdom and France, while reaching the top five in several other countries; it ultimately sold around 1.5 million copies worldwide.

Loved Me Back to Life was supported by several singles, led by the title track, which reached the top 20 in the United Kingdom and peaked at number 24 on the US Adult Contemporary chart. "Incredible", a duet with Ne-Yo, followed as the second single in several markets and also reached the top 30 on the US Adult Contemporary chart. Dion promoted the album extensively through television performances and appearances across North America and Europe, including The Voice, The Today Show, The X Factor, Wetten, dass..?, and her 2013 European Tour.

== Background ==
In June 2012, Dion's official website announced that during April and May, she had begun recording songs for her next English and French albums, which were planned for release in fall 2012. The English album was planned to include studio versions of previously unreleased songs from Dion's Las Vegas show, Celine, as well as several new tracks. In August 2012, celinedion.com confirmed that a cover of Journey's "Open Arms", which opens Dion's Las Vegas show, would appear on the upcoming English album. In September 2012, it was also revealed that "Ne me quitte pas" would be included on the English album. Eventually, "Ne me quitte pas" was released on the deluxe edition of Sans attendre, and "Open Arms" appeared only on the Japanese edition of the English album.

Le Journal de Montréal reported that the English album would include songs written by Eg White, who had worked with Adele on 19 and 21, tracks produced by Babyface, and a duet with Stevie Wonder on "Overjoyed", which Dion performed during her Las Vegas show. In March 2013, Ne-Yo confirmed earlier information from Dion's website that the two had recorded a duet. He described the collaboration as challenging and said it made him question his vocal ability. The pair had previously worked together on 2007's Taking Chances, with Ne-Yo co-writing and co-producing "I Got Nothin' Left". Another new track, "Unfinished Songs", written by Diane Warren, was included in the British-German film Song for Marion. When the film's soundtrack was released in February 2013, it did not include Dion's recording, which was held for her upcoming album. A recording session for "Unfinished Songs" was posted on Dion's website in July 2013.

On 14 September 2012, celinedion.com announced that Dion's new English album, titled Water and a Flame, would be released in November 2012. However, on 26 September 2012, Sony Music postponed the release to 2013. In March 2013, René Angélil explained that the delay was due to a change in the album's concept. Instead of an equal split between original songs and covers, the decision was made to focus primarily on original material. Angélil stated that the album had originally been planned to include six covers and six original songs. After further discussion, they chose to include two covers from Dion's Las Vegas show: "At Seventeen" and "Overjoyed". A behind-the-scenes video of Dion recording "At Seventeen", produced by Babyface, was posted on her website in April 2013. "Overjoyed", with a new arrangement by Stevie Wonder, was co-produced by Tricky Stewart. In April 2013, celinedion.com also shared a behind-the-scenes look at Dion and producer Eg White recording "Water and a Flame". The remainder of the album was planned to include original songs, including two co-written by Audra Mae. The album was scheduled for release in October 2013. In July 2013, it was announced that the title had been changed to Loved Me Back to Life. Dion performed the title song live for the first time during the Céline... une seule fois concert in Quebec City on 27 July 2013, and two days later her website announced that the album would be released in November 2013.

== Content ==
On 29 August 2013, Billboard announced that the album Loved Me Back to Life would be released in North America on 5 November 2013, with the lead single, "Loved Me Back to Life", arriving on 3 September 2013. The publication described the album as Dion's "edgiest record to date -- just not in the ways you might think". It praised tracks such as "Water and a Flame", originally recorded by Daniel Merriweather and Adele, which presents Dion's lower, grainier vocal register. The lead single, written by Sia and produced by Sham and Motesart, was noted as "a different kind of power ballad for Dion", sung in a minor key and supported by a chorus with a beat drop reminiscent of dubstep.

The album includes two songs written by Ne-Yo, among them the duet "Incredible", which Billboard suggested could suit the Olympic Committee for the 2014 Winter Games. Additional collaborators include Babyface, Tricky Stewart, and Swedish trio Play Production, who produced the beat‑driven "Somebody Loves Somebody", co‑written by the group and Audra Mae. The album also contains two covers from Dion's Las Vegas show Celine – Janis Ian's "At Seventeen" and a rendition of "Overjoyed", performed as a duet with Stevie Wonder. The deluxe edition adds two more songs from her Las Vegas performances, "How Do You Keep the Music Playing?" and "Lullaby (Goodnight, My Angel)", along with four collector postcards. Loved Me Back to Life also includes "Unfinished Songs", written by Diane Warren for the film Song for Marion.

The album was also issued on a vinyl LP and includes "Save Your Soul", which contains a rap interlude by Malcolm David Kelley of MKTO. This two-disc 180-gram edition includes an eight-page booklet with exclusive photos and imagery, as well as a CD of the full album. The Japanese edition includes "Open Arms", produced by Fraser T Smith, who also co-wrote and produced Adele's "Set Fire to the Rain". The album additionally contains "Breakaway", written by Audra Mae, Johan Fransson, Tim Larsson, and Tobias Lundgre, and previously recorded by German singer Ivy Quainoo for her 2012 album Ivy. On 29 October 2013, Billboard reported that "Always Be Your Girl" was the first original song selected for the album. Written by Dana Parish and Andrew Hollander after they watched Dion's 2011 documentary 3 Boys and a New Show on OWN, the song holds personal significance for Dion, who associates its lyrics with her sons.

== Singles ==
The first single, "Loved Me Back to Life", was released on 3 September 2013. In the United States, it debuted at number 26 on Billboard's Adult Contemporary chart, becoming Dion's 40th entry on this list. "Loved Me Back to Life" peaked on the AC chart in its third week, reaching number 24. The song sold 23,000 downloads in its first week, enabling its debut on Pop Digital Songs at number 19 and on Hot Digital Songs at number 63. It also reached number three on the Hot Dance Club Songs chart. In Canada, "Loved Me Back to Life" earned the Hot Shot Debut on the Canadian Hot 100, entering at number 26. It became Dion's best debut to date on the chart and her second-highest peak, behind 2007's "Taking Chances". In the United Kingdom, "Loved Me Back to Life" reached number 14, becoming Dion's highest-charting single there since "A New Day Has Come" peaked at number seven in 2002.

"Breakaway" was released as the second, promotional-only single in the United Kingdom on 5 December 2013, and in France on 22 January 2014. On 14 February 2014, "Incredible" (a duet with Ne-Yo) was digitally released as the second single in most European countries (except France and the United Kingdom), as well as in Australia and New Zealand. The song was also sent to Adult Contemporary radio stations in the United States on 24 February 2014, where it reached number 25. On the Canadian Hot 100, "Incredible" peaked at number 44. The music video for "Incredible" premiered on 4 June 2014. Although scheduled for commercial release in the United Kingdom on 24 March 2014, "Water and a Flame" became the third, radio-only single there.

== Promotion ==
After limited promotion of the first single, "Loved Me Back to Life", in the United States in September 2013, another new track, "Somebody Loves Somebody", premiered on 17 October 2013. The official audio of "Somebody Loves Somebody" was released on Dion's Vevo channel on 22 October 2013. On 29 October 2013, the official audio of "Incredible" (a duet with Ne-Yo) was also released. On 5 November 2013, two additional tracks were uploaded to Vevo: "Water and a Flame" and "At Seventeen". On 3 December 2013, the audio of "Breakaway" was added. Several behind-the-scenes videos were also posted on Vevo.

Dion began promoting the album in the United States. On 28 October 2013, she performed "Somebody Loves Somebody" and "Water and a Flame" on The Today Show, and "Loved Me Back to Life" on Late Night with Jimmy Fallon. She also performed "Loved Me Back to Life" on The View on 30 October 2013. Additionally, Dion gave an intimate club performance at the Edison Ballroom in New York City on 29 October 2013, which was broadcast on 1 November 2013 on QVC. She performed older hits and several new songs, including "Loved Me Back to Life", "Water and a Flame", and "At Seventeen", and the concert received positive reviews. On 6 November 2013, Dion performed "Somebody Loves Somebody" on The Dr. Oz Show. In Canada, she performed "Loved Me Back to Life" and "Incredible" with Ne-Yo on Le Banquier on 3 November 2013.

In Europe, Dion performed "Loved Me Back to Life" on Wetten, dass..? in Germany on 9 November 2013, and on The X Factor in the United Kingdom on 10 November 2013. She also recorded a performance of "Breakaway" for Strictly Come Dancing, which was broadcast on 15 December 2013. Dion also performed "Loved Me Back to Life", "At Seventeen", and older hits on C'est votre vie in France on 16 November 2013. She also performed "Loved Me Back to Life" and "Water and a Flame" during her European Tour 2013, which began in Belgium on 21 November 2013. Later in France, Dion performed "Loved Me Back to Life" on Les chansons d'abord on 1 December 2013, Vivement Dimanche on 8 December 2013, Les disques d'Or on 18 December 2013, and Ce soir on chante on 3 January 2014. Her concert Céline... une seule fois was broadcast on three European channels: RTS Deux in Switzerland on 24 December 2013, D8 in France on 25 December 2013, and La Une in Belgium on 31 December 2013.

Dion returned to the United States in mid-December 2013 and performed "Incredible" with Ne-Yo during the grand finale of The Voice on 17 December 2013. The next day, she performed "Loved Me Back to Life", "Incredible" with Ne-Yo, and "Didn't Know Love" during the CBS 15th annual A Home for the Holidays television special, which celebrates adoption by sharing stories from foster care to raise awareness for the cause. On 30 December 2013, Dion returned to performing her show Celine in Las Vegas and recorded "Loved Me Back to Life" especially for the Canadian Global Television Network as part of the ET Canada New Year's Eve at Niagara Falls broadcast. On 31 December 2013, Ne-Yo surprised Dion by appearing onstage to perform "Incredible" during the New Year's Eve performance of Celine in Las Vegas.

== Critical reception ==
Professional ratings
Aggregate scores
Source	Rating
Metacritic	65/100
Review scores
Source	Rating
AllMusic	3.5/5 stars
Contactmusic.com	2.5/5 stars
Daily Express	5/5 stars
Daily News	3/5 stars
The Gazette	3/5 stars
The Guardian	3/5 stars
Idolator	3.5/5 stars
The Oakland Press	3/4 stars
Slant Magazine	3/5 stars
USA Today	3/4 stars

Loved Me Back to Life received generally positive reviews from music critics. According to the review aggregator Metacritic, the album holds a score of 65/100, indicating "generally favorable reviews". AllMusic awarded the album three and a half out of five stars, describing it as "a record that flirts with new ideas but never hooks up. Yet, that flirtation counts for something: it means the album is livelier, less self-conscious, less beholden to the expected, and quick-footed enough to not seem mired in show biz glitz". Reviewer Stephen Thomas Erlewine added that "there's nothing here that screams big hit, but it's something better: the work of a diva who is comfortable in her own skin".

In a positive review for The New York Times, Jon Caramanica noted Dion's long-standing affinity for melodrama and grandeur, writing that "she is the iceberg, destroying all Titanics". He praised her willingness to evolve on Loved Me Back to Life, her first English-language album in six years, calling it "positively peppy" compared with her usual ballad-driven style. Caramanica praised subtle influences of contemporary R&B and hip hop, including production by Tricky Stewart, and mentioned the rap interlude by Malcolm David Kelley on the vinyl edition of "Save Your Soul". He also pointed to the album's embrace of modern dance-pop on the title track, co-written by Sia. Caramanica concluded that Dion sings "with more rhythm, if not more clarity, than usual". An unusually favorable review came from Rolling Stone, where editor Dave Dimartino (writing for Yahoo Music) described the album as "a damned fine, polished thing, exactly what you'd want to release when you're renowned as the highest-grossing touring artist in the world from 2000 to 2010, and a solid listen through and through".

Elysa Gardner of USA Today gave the album three out of four stars, noting Dion's use of "softer, grittier vocals and more nuanced drama than previous power ballads". She added that "a subtler, more subdued Celine Dion may be interesting in theory, but bright shades still suit this diva best". The Oakland Press critic Gary Graff also awarded the album three out of four stars, writing that it "finds Dion creatively frisky and exploring new sonic environments for the muscular voice that helped sink the Titanic, at least on film". He praised contributions from producers including Hasham Hussain, Emanuel Kiriakou, and the Swedish team Play Production. Graff described the title track, co-written by Sia, as featuring a "stuttering vocal hook and dubstep-style beats" that would not sound out of place on a Rihanna album. He concluded that "it's not a wholesale reinvention, but Loved Me Back to Life will make fans look at Dion a little differently, and might even bring some new folks in from the sidelines".

Slant Magazine offered a more mixed assessment. Although giving the album three out of five stars, critic Eric Henderson argued that Dion's shift toward contemporary material felt unconvincing, comparing her to "every awkward soccer mom" attempting to appear current. He wrote that the album aims "to pass for contemporary", but praised Dion's rendition of Janis Ian's "At Seventeen", calling it a highlight that succeeds when she embraces her established style. Steve Morse of The Boston Globe criticized the album as "littered with syrupy, easy-listening, trite-lyric ballads that undersell her talent". He argued that Dion's attempts at a more gravelly vocal approach feel "stiff and mechanical", lacking the warmth for which she is known. RenownedForSound.com praised the album, awarding it four stars and stating that "Celine Dion has released something delightful for old and new fans, with a mixture of songs that have both a pop/RnB focus and her adult contemporary-pop roots".

== Commercial performance ==
Loved Me Back to Life debuted within the top 10 in at least 20 countries worldwide.

=== Canada ===
In Dion's native Canada, Loved Me Back to Life debuted at number one with 106,000 units sold. It became her 13th number-one album in the SoundScan era and 11th to debut at the top of the chart. Loved Me Back to Life also marked the strongest one-week sales for any release in Canada since 2008, when AC/DC's Black Ice sold 119,000 units. It was Dion's best one-week sales total since the 152,000 copies sold during the first week of 2002's A New Day Has Come. In its second week, the album remained at number one with 31,000 units sold. After these two weeks, Loved Me Back to Life ranked number nine on the Billboard Year-End chart of Top Canadian Albums. For the next three weeks, it held the number two position on the Canadian Albums Chart, selling 15,000, 19,000, and 19,000 copies. The album then fell to number six with 13,000 units sold, and in its seventh week rose to number four with 19,000 copies sold. In the final week of 2013, it dropped to number six with 10,000 units sold, bringing total sales to 231,000 copies. It became the second best-selling album in Canada in 2013, behind Eminem's The Marshall Mathers LP 2, which sold 242,000 units. In December 2013, the album was certified four-times platinum by Music Canada for shipments of 320,000 copies.

=== United States ===
In the United States, Loved Me Back to Life debuted at number two with 77,000 copies sold in its first week, becoming Dion's highest-charting album since One Heart also debuted at number two in 2003. In the next two weeks, the album fell to number 13 and number 26, selling 25,000 and 13,000 units. In its fourth week, it rose one spot to number 25 with 30,000 copies sold (up 132%). It later dropped to number 35 with 16,000 units sold, and then to number 38 with another 16,000 copies sold. In its seventh week, boosted by Dion's performance on the finale of The Voice and the CBS special A Home for the Holidays, the album climbed to number 26 with 28,000 units sold (up 72%). In the final week of 2013, it fell to number 31 with 19,000 copies sold, bringing total sales to 224,000 units. As of June 2014, it has sold over 300,000 copies in the US.

=== United Kingdom ===
In the United Kingdom, Loved Me Back to Life debuted at number three with 53,000 copies sold, becoming Dion's highest-charting album since the 2002 chart-topper A New Day Has Come. On 22 November 2013, it was certified silver for sales exceeding 60,000 copies. In its second week, it fell to number four with 28,000 units sold, and in the third week slipped to number eight with another 28,000 copies sold. On 6 December 2013, it was certified gold for sales exceeding 100,000 units. In the next two weeks, it remained at number eight with sales of 34,000 and 44,000 copies. In its sixth week, following Dion's performance on Strictly Come Dancing, the album rose to number seven with 64,000 units sold (its highest weekly total, up 45%). The following week, it fell to number 13 with 33,000 copies sold, bringing total sales to 283,000 units. After seven weeks in 2013, it placed at number 23 on the UK Year-End Albums Chart. As of 2 February 2014, the album had sold over 300,000 copies, and five days later it was certified platinum. By June 2014, total UK sales reached 350,000 units.

=== France ===
In France, Loved Me Back to Life entered the chart at number three with 31,000 copies sold. In the following weeks, it charted at number five (17,000 units), number six (19,000), number seven (17,000), number 10 (20,000), and number 11 (24,000). In the seventh week, the album rose to number 10 with its highest weekly sales of 34,000 copies (up 40%). In the final week of 2013, it climbed to number nine with 25,000 units sold, bringing total sales to 186,000 copies. On 18 December 2013, Loved Me Back to Life was certified double platinum by SNEP for shipments of 200,000 units. As of 1 June 2014, it had sold over 215,000 copies in France.

=== Rest of the world ===
The album achieved similar success internationally, reaching number one in the Netherlands, number two in Belgium and Taiwan, number three in Switzerland, Ireland, and South Africa, number four in Austria, Hungary, and China, number seven in Norway, number eight in the Czech Republic and South Korea, number nine in Germany, Australia, and Croatia, and number 10 in New Zealand. It also reached the top 20 in Denmark, Italy, Poland, Spain, Portugal, Greece, Sweden, and Finland. Loved Me Back to Life was certified gold in Belgium, Switzerland, Poland, Hungary, and South Africa, and has sold 1.5 million copies worldwide.

== Accolades ==
Thanks to Loved Me Back to Life, Dion received four nominations at the Juno Awards of 2014: Artist of the Year, Fan Choice Award, Album of the Year, and Adult Contemporary Album of the Year. She was also nominated for six 2014 World Music Awards, including World's Best Female Artist, World's Best Album (Loved Me Back to Life), and World's Best Song ("Incredible"). In 2014, she also received two nominations at the Félix Awards: Anglophone Album of the Year (Loved Me Back to Life) and Artist of the Year Achieving the Most Success Outside Quebec, but lost both categories to Arcade Fire.

== Controversy ==
Loved Me Back to Life was originally intended to be titled Water and a Flame, named after another track on the album, "Water and a Flame", written by Australian singer-songwriter Daniel Merriweather and British musician Eg White, and first performed by Merriweather and Adele. In an April 2013 interview on The Katie Couric Show to promote the album, Dion played a recording of her cover of "Water and a Flame". Before introducing the song, Katie Couric asked Dion and her husband and manager, René Angélil, about the then title of the album: "where did 'Water and a Flame' come from?" Angélil replied, "It's, you know, the opposites". Dion added, "It's the name of the song".

Musician Samantha Ronson, a friend of Merriweather, wrote a blog post that included the video of the interview and the comment: "Dear Celine Dion, when you cover someone else's song- you might want to give them credit". In June 2013, Merriweather shared Ronson's post on his Facebook page and criticized Dion, writing, "This song has every ounce of my heartache and pain in it and she pretends as if she wrote it herself". Two days later, Dion's management responded on her website, stating that although Dion often does not mention songwriters during interviews, "she has been very vocal about the fact that she does not write her own songs," that no harm was intended, and that all writers and producers were credited in the liner notes. On 25 July 2013, her website confirmed that the album had been re-titled Loved Me Back to Life.

== Track listing ==
Standard edition
No.	Title	Writer(s)	Producer(s)	Length
1.	"Loved Me Back to Life"	Hasham Hussain; Denarius Motes; Sia Furler	Sham & Motesart; Hussain^{[a]}	3:50
2.	"Somebody Loves Somebody"	Johan Fransson; Tim Larsson; Tobias Lundgren; Audra Mae	Play Production	3:40
3.	"Incredible" (with Ne-Yo)	Andrew Goldstein; Emanuel Kiriakou; Shaffer Smith	Kiriakou	3:55
4.	"Water and a Flame"	Eg White; Daniel Merriweather	White	3:42
5.	"Breakaway"	Fransson; Larsson; Lundgren; Mae	Play Production	4:37
6.	"Save Your Soul^{[b]}"	Daniel Murcia	Kiriakou; Danny Mercer; Goldstein^{[c]}	3:47
7.	"Didn't Know Love"	White; Jessi Alexander; Tommy Lee James	White	3:35
8.	"Thank You"	S. Smith	Jesse Wilson; Reginald Smith; Ne-Yo^{[d]}	3:58
9.	"Overjoyed" (with Stevie Wonder)	Wonder	Tricky Stewart; Aaron Pearce; Kuk Harrell^{[a]}	4:03
10.	"Thankful"	Dana Parish; Andrew Hollander	Kiriakou	3:55
11.	"At Seventeen"	Janis Ian	Babyface	4:28
12.	"Always Be Your Girl"	Parish; Hollander	Babyface; Walter Afanasieff	4:13
13.	"Unfinished Songs"	Diane Warren	Stewart; D'Mile; Kyle Townsend^{[a]}	3:40
Total length:				51:23

Deluxe edition
No.	Title	Writer(s)	Producer(s)	Length
14.	"How Do You Keep the Music Playing"	Alan Bergman; Marilyn Bergman; Michel Legrand	Stewart; Pearce; Harrell^{[a]}	4:21
15.	"Lullabye (Goodnight, My Angel)"	Billy Joel	Babyface	4:18
Total length:				60:02

Japanese edition
No.	Title	Writer(s)	Producer(s)	Length
16.	"Open Arms"	Steve Perry; Jonathan Cain	Fraser T. Smith	3:08
Total length:				63:10

=== Notes ===
- ^{^a} signifies a vocal producer
- ^{^b} features rap by Malcolm Kelley on the vinyl edition of the album
- ^{^c} signifies an additional producer
- ^{^d} signifies a co-producer
- The US limited edition includes a bonus disc with "Loved Me Back to Life" (Dave Audé radio mix) and four songs from Dion's previous albums.

== Charts ==
=== Weekly charts ===
Weekly chart performance
Chart (2013–2014)	Peak position
Australian Albums (ARIA)	9
Austrian Albums (Ö3 Austria)	4
Belgian Albums (Ultratop Flanders)	2
Belgian Albums (Ultratop Wallonia)	2
Canadian Albums (Billboard)	1
China Western Albums (Sino Chart)	4
Croatian International Albums (HDU)	9
Czech Albums (ČNS IFPI)	8
Danish Albums (Hitlisten)	11
Dutch Albums (Album Top 100)	1
Finnish Albums (Suomen virallinen lista)	16
French Albums (SNEP)	3
German Albums (Offizielle Top 100)	9
Greek Albums (IFPI)	12
Hungarian Albums (MAHASZ)	4
Irish Albums (IRMA)	3
Italian Albums (FIMI)	11
Japanese Albums (Oricon)	34
Japanese International Albums (Oricon)	6
Japanese Top Albums (Billboard Japan)	32
Mexican Albums (Top 100)	59
New Zealand Albums (RMNZ)	10
Norwegian Albums (VG-lista)	7
Polish Albums (ZPAV)	11
Portuguese Albums (AFP)	12
Quebec (ADISQ)	1
Scottish Albums (Official Charts)	2
South African Albums (RISA)	3
South Korean Albums (Circle)	24
South Korean International Albums (Circle)	8
Spanish Albums (Promusicae)	12
Swedish Albums (Sverigetopplistan)	13
Swiss Albums (Schweizer Hitparade)	3
Swiss Albums (Schweizer Hitparade Romandy)	2
UK Albums (Official Charts)	3
US Billboard 200	2

=== Year-end charts ===
2013 year-end chart performance
Chart (2013)	Position
Belgian Albums (Ultratop Flanders)	42
Belgian Albums (Ultratop Wallonia)	19
Canadian Albums (Billboard)	9
Canadian Albums (SoundScan)	2
Danish Albums (Hitlisten)	45
Dutch Albums (Album Top 100)	60
French Albums (SNEP)	16
Hungarian Albums (MAHASZ)	45
Swiss Albums (Schweizer Hitparade)	58
UK Albums (OCC)	23
Worldwide Albums (IFPI)	25

2014 year-end chart performance
Chart (2014)	Position
Belgian Albums (Ultratop Flanders)	116
Belgian Albums (Ultratop Wallonia)	51
Canadian Albums (Billboard)	8
French Albums (SNEP)	144
Swiss Albums (Schweizer Hitparade)	99
US Billboard 200	129

=== All-time charts ===
All-time chart performance
Chart	Position
Canadian Artists Albums (SoundScan)	71

== Certifications and sales ==
Certifications
Region	Certification	Certified units/sales
Belgium (BRMA)	Gold	15,000^{*}
Canada (Music Canada)	4× Platinum	320,000^{^}
France (SNEP)	2× Platinum	200,000^{*}
Hungary (MAHASZ)	Gold	1,000^{^}
Poland (ZPAV)	Gold	10,000^{*}
South Africa (RISA)	Gold	20,000^{*}
Switzerland (IFPI Switzerland)	Gold	10,000^{^}
United Kingdom (BPI)	Platinum	350,000
United States	—	300,000
Summaries
Worldwide	—	1,500,000
^{*} Sales figures based on certification alone.^{^} Shipments figures based on certification alone.

== Release history ==
Release history
Region	Date	Label	Format	Catalog
Austria; Germany; Switzerland	1 November 2013	Columbia	CD; digital; vinyl LP	88697137152 (standard CD), 88883788312 (deluxe CD), 88697137151 (vinyl LP)
France	4 November 2013	Columbia	CD; digital; vinyl LP	88697137152 (standard CD), 88883788312 (deluxe CD), 88697137151 (vinyl LP)
Canada; United States	5 November 2013	Columbia	CD; digital; vinyl LP	88697137152 (standard CD), 88883788312 (deluxe CD), 88697137151 (vinyl LP)
Australia	8 November 2013	Columbia	CD; digital; vinyl LP	88697137152 (standard CD), 88883788312 (deluxe CD), 88697137151 (vinyl LP)
United Kingdom	11 November 2013	Columbia	CD; digital; vinyl LP	88697137152 (standard CD), 88883788312 (deluxe CD), 88697137151 (vinyl LP)
Japan	4 December 2013	SMEJ	CD; digital; vinyl LP	SICP-3912

== See also ==
- 2013 in British music charts
- List of fastest-selling albums
- List of number-one albums of 2013 (Canada)
