= Break Away (Ivy Quainoo song) =

2012 song by Ivy Quainoo

"Break Away" is a song originally recorded by German singer Ivy Quainoo for her 2012 album Ivy. Retitled "Breakaway", it was later covered by Canadian singer Celine Dion for her English-language studio album Loved Me Back to Life (2013).

== Celine Dion version ==
"Breakaway"

Promotional single by Celine Dion

from the album Loved Me Back to Life
- Released: 5 December 2013
- Recorded: 2012
- Studio: At the Palms (Las Vegas); RMV (Stockholm); Larrabee Sound (North Hollywood)
- Genre: Pop
- Length: 4:38 (album version); 3:39 (radio edit)
- Label: Columbia
- Songwriters: Johan Fransson; Tim Larsson; Tobias Lundgren; Audra Mae
- Producer: Play Production

Audio
- "Breakaway" on YouTube

"Breakaway" was recorded by Celine Dion for her eleventh English-language studio album, Loved Me Back to Life. Written by Johan Fransson, Tim Larsson, Tobias Lundgren, and Audra Mae, the track was produced by Play Production. Columbia Records issued it as a promotional single in the United Kingdom on 5 December 2013 and in France on 22 January 2014.

=== Background and release ===
"Breakaway" and "Somebody Loves Somebody" were produced by Swedish trio Play Production for Dion's album Loved Me Back to Life. Both songs were written by Johan Fransson, Tim Larsson, Tobias Lundgren, and Audra Mae. On 2 December 2013, Dion's official website confirmed "Breakaway" as the second UK single. Two days earlier, it had been selected as a "Record of the Week" on BBC Radio 2. The official audio premiered on Dion's Vevo channel on 3 December 2013. Two days later, the track entered the A-List on BBC Radio 2's playlist. It reached number 38 on the UK Radio Airplay Chart in mid-December 2013. On 22 January 2014, it was announced as the second single in France and sent to radio the same day.

=== Critical reception ===
"Breakaway" received positive reviews from music critics. Jim Farber of the Daily News wrote that it "balances modern R&B with '60s lounge music in a way that would flatter Adele". Elysa Gardner of USA Today highlighted the song, noting that Dion begins "low and sultry" before delivering her signature powerful soprano. Gary Graff of The Oakland Press praised the progression from Dion's lower register to her more polished tone. Andrew Hampp of Billboard described the track as "powerful" and noted its gritty, rock-influenced vocal style. Deban Aderemi of Wiwibloggs called it a "beautiful piano-led track" with rich orchestration and an expressive vocal performance.

=== Live performances ===
In early November 2013, Dion performed "Breakaway" on the UK show Strictly Come Dancing, which was broadcast during the semi-finals on 15 December 2013.

=== Credits and personnel ===
==== Recording ====
- Vocals recorded at Studio at the Palms, Las Vegas, Nevada
- Strings recorded at RMV Studios, Stockholm
- Mixed at Larrabee Studios, North Hollywood, California

==== Personnel ====
- Johan Fransson – songwriting
- Tim Larsson – songwriting
- Tobias Lundgren – songwriting
- Audra Mae – songwriting
- Play Production – production
- François Lalonde – vocals recording
- Mark Everton Gray – vocals recording assistant
- Manny Marroquin – mixing
- Chris Galland – mixing assistant
- Delbert Bowers – mixing assistant
- Tim Larsson – programming
- Johan Fransson – piano
- Daniel Lykkeklev – electric bass
- Andreas Johansson – acoustic and electric guitars
- Tobias Lundgren – background vocals
- Johan Fransson – string arrangement
- Henrik Janson – string arrangement
- Ulf Janson – string arrangement
- Henrik Janson – strings conductor
- Ulf Janson – strings conductor
- Stockholm Session Strings – orchestra
- Bernard Löhr – technician

=== Charts ===
Chart performance
Chart (2013–2014)	Peak position
UK Airplay (OCC)	38

=== Release history ===
Release history
Region	Date	Format	Version	Label	Ref.
United Kingdom	5 December 2013	Adult Contemporary radio	Radio edit	Columbia	
France	22 January 2014	Contemporary hit radio	Radio edit	Columbia	
