= List of number-one albums of 2013 (Canada) =

These are the Canadian number-one albums of 2013. The chart is compiled by Nielsen Soundscan and published by Jam! Canoe, issued every Sunday. The chart also appears in Billboard magazine as Top Canadian Albums.

== Number-one albums ==
Key
†	Indicates best-performing album of 2013

Issue date	Album	Artist	References
January 5	Take Me Home †	One Direction	
January 12	Take Me Home †	One Direction	
January 19	Babel	Mumford & Sons	
January 26	Notes From The Underground	Hollywood Undead	
February 2	Long. Live. ASAP	ASAP Rocky	
February 9	Classified	Classified	
February 16	Believe Acoustic	Justin Bieber	
February 23	All That Echoes	Josh Groban	
March 2	Babel	Mumford & Sons	
March 9	Babel	Mumford & Sons	
March 16	Punkt	Pierre Lapointe	
March 23	Spring Break…Here to Party	Luke Bryan	
March 30	What About Now	Bon Jovi	
April 6	The 20/20 Experience	Justin Timberlake	
April 13	The 20/20 Experience	Justin Timberlake	
April 20	The 20/20 Experience	Justin Timberlake	
April 27	Outlaw Gentlemen & Shady Ladies	Volbeat	
May 4	Save Rock and Roll	Fall Out Boy	
May 11	To Be Loved	Michael Bublé	
May 18	To Be Loved	Michael Bublé	
May 25	To Be Loved	Michael Bublé	
June 1	Demi	Demi Lovato	
June 8	Random Access Memories	Daft Punk	
June 15	Random Access Memories	Daft Punk	
June 22	The Hurry and the Harm	City and Colour	
June 29	13	Black Sabbath	
July 6	Yeezus	Kanye West	
July 13	Yeezus	Kanye West	
July 20	Unorthodox Jukebox	Bruno Mars	
July 27	Magna Carta Holy Grail	Jay-Z	
August 3	Magna Carta Holy Grail	Jay-Z	
August 10	Stars Dance	Selena Gomez	
August 17	Blurred Lines	Robin Thicke	
August 24	The Civil Wars	The Civil Wars	
August 31	Crash My Party	Luke Bryan	
September 7	Paradise Valley	John Mayer	
September 14	Hail to the King	Avenged Sevenfold	
September 21	Hesitation Marks	Nine Inch Nails	
September 28	Fuse	Keith Urban	
October 5	From Here to Now to You	Jack Johnson	
October 12	Nothing Was the Same	Drake	
October 19	The 20/20 Experience - 2 of 2	Justin Timberlake	
October 26	Bangerz	Miley Cyrus	
November 2	Lightning Bolt	Pearl Jam	
November 9	Prism	Katy Perry	
November 16	Reflektor	Arcade Fire	
November 23	Loved Me Back to Life	Celine Dion	
November 30	Loved Me Back to Life	Celine Dion	
December 7	The Marshall Mathers LP 2	Eminem	
December 14	Midnight Memories	One Direction	
December 21	Midnight Memories	One Direction	
December 28	Beyoncé	Beyoncé	

== See also ==
- List of Canadian Hot 100 number-one singles of 2013
