= List of Canadian Hot 100 number-one singles of 2013 =

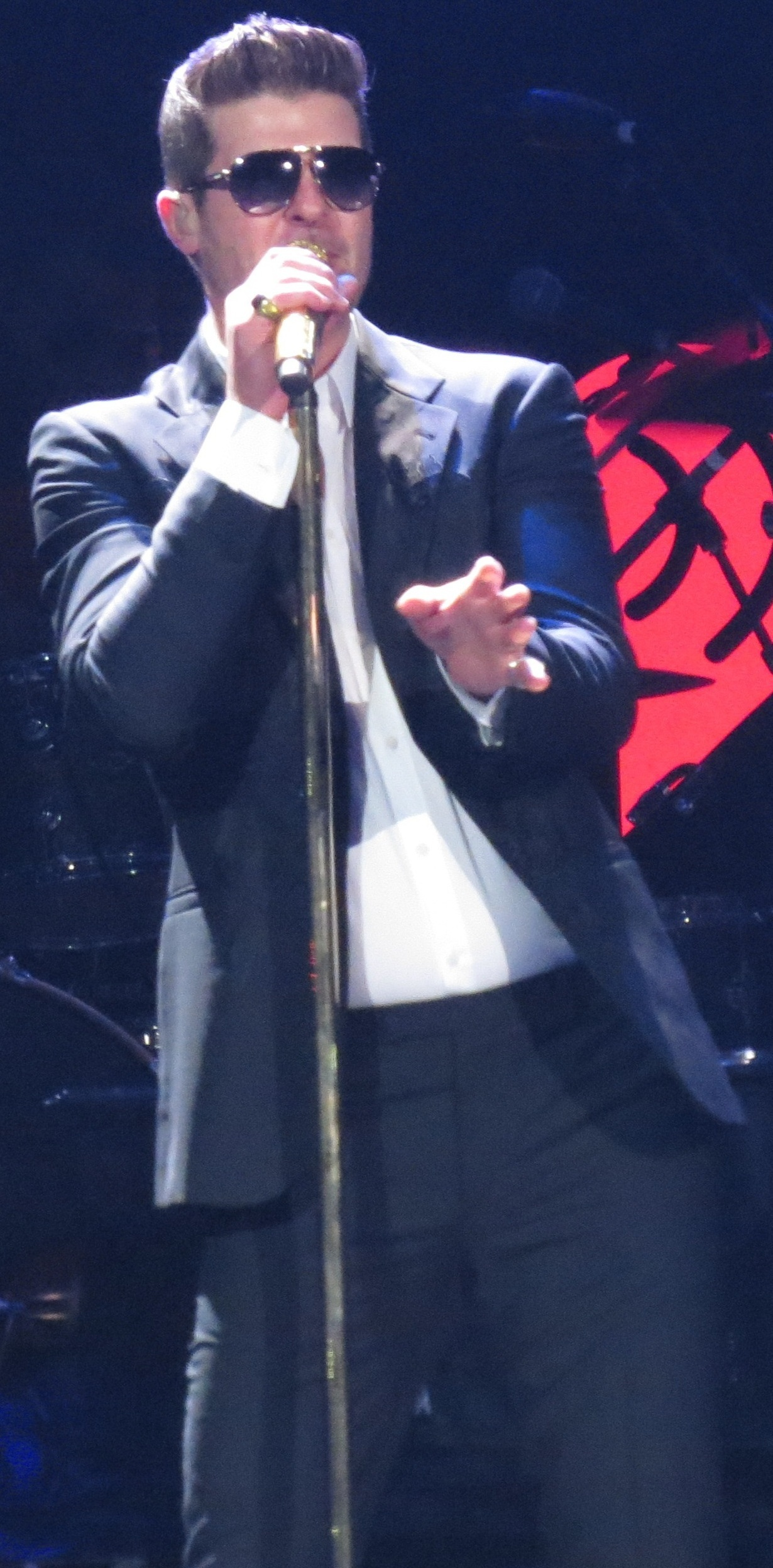
"Blurred Lines" by Robin Thicke (pictured) featuring T.I. and Pharrell spent thirteen weeks at number one, the longest-running number-one single of 2013. It later ranked as the best-performing single of the year.

This is a list of the Canadian Billboard magazine Canadian Hot 100 number-ones of 2013.

Note that Billboard publishes charts with an issue date approximately 7–10 days in advance.

== Chart history ==
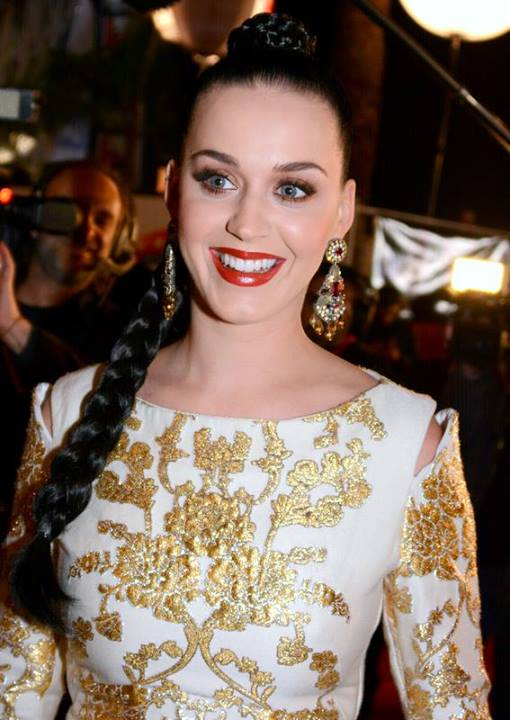
Katy Perry (pictured)'s "Roar" debuted at number one, becoming the eleventh song to do so.

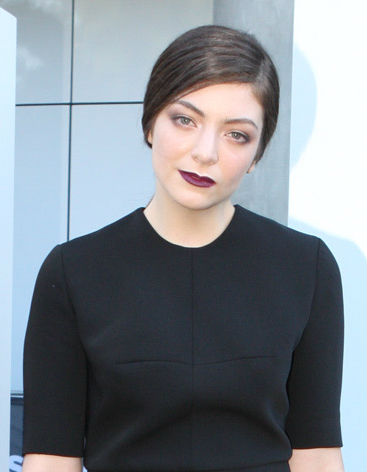
Lorde (pictured) earned her first number-one single with "Royals".

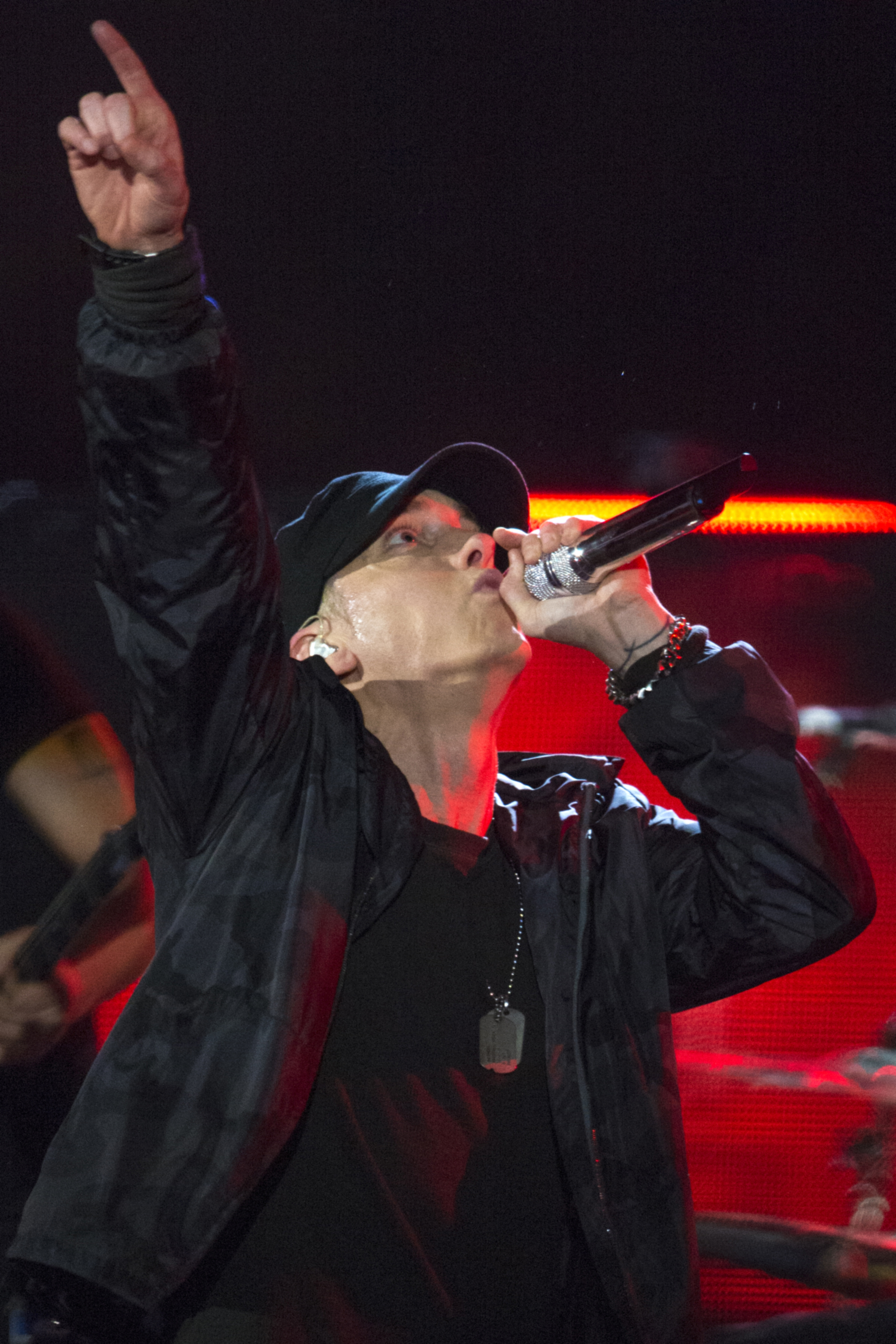
"The Monster" by Eminem (pictured) featuring Rihanna debuted at number one, becoming the twelfth song to do so.

Key
†	Indicates best-performing single of 2013

No.	Issue date	Song	Artist(s)	Reference(s)
73	January 5	"Locked Out of Heaven"	Bruno Mars	
74	January 12	"Scream & Shout"	will.i.am and Britney Spears	
74	January 19	"Scream & Shout"	will.i.am and Britney Spears	
74	January 26	"Scream & Shout"	will.i.am and Britney Spears	
74	February 2	"Scream & Shout"	will.i.am and Britney Spears	
75	February 9	"Thrift Shop"	Macklemore & Ryan Lewis featuring Wanz	
75	February 16	"Thrift Shop"	Macklemore & Ryan Lewis featuring Wanz	
75	February 23	"Thrift Shop"	Macklemore & Ryan Lewis featuring Wanz	
75	March 2	"Thrift Shop"	Macklemore & Ryan Lewis featuring Wanz	
75	March 9	"Thrift Shop"	Macklemore & Ryan Lewis featuring Wanz	
75	March 16	"Thrift Shop"	Macklemore & Ryan Lewis featuring Wanz	
76	March 23	"Stay"	Rihanna featuring Mikky Ekko	
76	March 30	"Stay"	Rihanna featuring Mikky Ekko	
76	April 6	"Stay"	Rihanna featuring Mikky Ekko	
77	April 13	"Just Give Me a Reason"	Pink featuring Nate Ruess	
77	April 20	"Just Give Me a Reason"	Pink featuring Nate Ruess	
77	April 27	"Just Give Me a Reason"	Pink featuring Nate Ruess	
77	May 4	"Just Give Me a Reason"	Pink featuring Nate Ruess	
77	May 11	"Just Give Me a Reason"	Pink featuring Nate Ruess	
77	May 18	"Just Give Me a Reason"	Pink featuring Nate Ruess	
77	May 25	"Just Give Me a Reason"	Pink featuring Nate Ruess	
78	June 1	"Blurred Lines" †	Robin Thicke featuring T.I. and Pharrell	
78	June 8	"Blurred Lines" †	Robin Thicke featuring T.I. and Pharrell	
78	June 15	"Blurred Lines" †	Robin Thicke featuring T.I. and Pharrell	
78	June 22	"Blurred Lines" †	Robin Thicke featuring T.I. and Pharrell	
78	June 29	"Blurred Lines" †	Robin Thicke featuring T.I. and Pharrell	
78	July 6	"Blurred Lines" †	Robin Thicke featuring T.I. and Pharrell	
78	July 13	"Blurred Lines" †	Robin Thicke featuring T.I. and Pharrell	
78	July 20	"Blurred Lines" †	Robin Thicke featuring T.I. and Pharrell	
78	July 27	"Blurred Lines" †	Robin Thicke featuring T.I. and Pharrell	
78	August 3	"Blurred Lines" †	Robin Thicke featuring T.I. and Pharrell	
78	August 10	"Blurred Lines" †	Robin Thicke featuring T.I. and Pharrell	
78	August 17	"Blurred Lines" †	Robin Thicke featuring T.I. and Pharrell	
78	August 24	"Blurred Lines" †	Robin Thicke featuring T.I. and Pharrell	
79	August 31	"Roar"	Katy Perry	
79	September 7	"Roar"	Katy Perry	
79	September 14	"Roar"	Katy Perry	
79	September 21	"Roar"	Katy Perry	
80	September 28	"Wrecking Ball"	Miley Cyrus	
re	October 5	"Roar"	Katy Perry	
81	October 12	"Royals"	Lorde	
81	October 19	"Royals"	Lorde	
81	October 26	"Royals"	Lorde	
81	November 2	"Royals"	Lorde	
81	November 9	"Royals"	Lorde	
82	November 16	"The Monster"	Eminem featuring Rihanna	
re	November 23	"Royals"	Lorde	
re	November 30	"The Monster"	Eminem featuring Rihanna	
re	December 7	"The Monster"	Eminem featuring Rihanna	
83	December 14	"Timber"	Pitbull featuring Kesha	
83	December 21	"Timber"	Pitbull featuring Kesha	
83	December 28	"Timber"	Pitbull featuring Kesha	

== See also ==
- List of number-one albums of 2013 (Canada)
