= Strictly Come Dancing series 11 =

Strictly Come Dancing
- Series 11
- Presented by: Bruce Forsyth; Tess Daly; Claudia Winkleman
- Judges: Darcey Bussell; Len Goodman; Craig Revel Horwood; Bruno Tonioli
- Celebrity winner: Abbey Clancy
- Professional winner: Aljaž Škorjanec
- No. of episodes: 27

Release
- Original network: BBC One
- Original release: 7 September – 21 December 2013

Series chronology
- ← Previous; Series 10 Next → Series 12

Strictly Come Dancing returned for its eleventh series beginning with a launch show on 7 September 2013, and the live shows beginning on 27 and 28 September 2013. Sir Bruce Forsyth and Tess Daly returned to co-present the main show on BBC One, with Claudia Winkleman presenting the results show alongside Daly. Zoe Ball returned as presenter of Strictly Come Dancing: It Takes Two on BBC Two. Darcey Bussell, Len Goodman, Craig Revel Horwood, and Bruno Tonioli also returned as judges.

This was the first series to be made at Elstree Film and Television Studios in Elstree, Hertfordshire. In March 2013, the show's former home at the BBC Television Centre in West London closed down for redevelopment. Strictly Come Dancing moved to Elstree for the series and settled into the vast George Lucas Stage 2 which had been recently refurbished. The move to the Elstree location saw a complete overhaul of the look of the show with a newly redesigned set.

The shows on 5 October, 9 November, and 7 December 2013 were hosted by Daly and Winkleman, with Forsyth taking time off. The show was broadcast live from the Blackpool Tower Ballroom on 16 November 2013.

Model Abbey Clancy and Aljaž Škorjanec were announced as the winners on 21 December, while Coronation Street actress Natalie Gumede and Artem Chigvintsev and BBC Breakfast presenter Susanna Reid and Kevin Clifton were the runners-up.

== Format ==
Hosts and Judges for Strictly Come Dancing Series 11

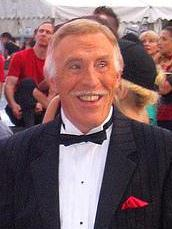
Bruce Forsyth

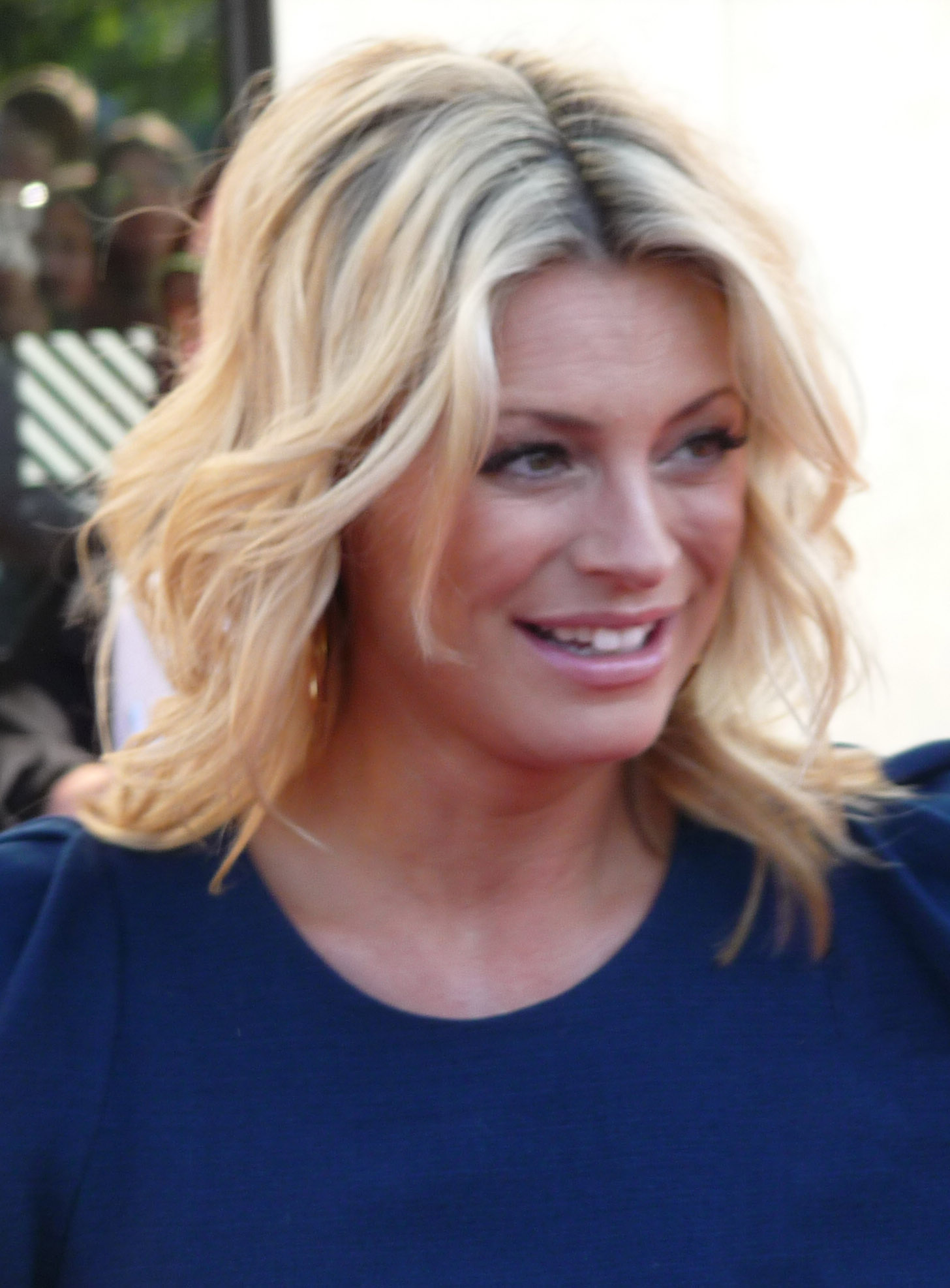
Tess Daly

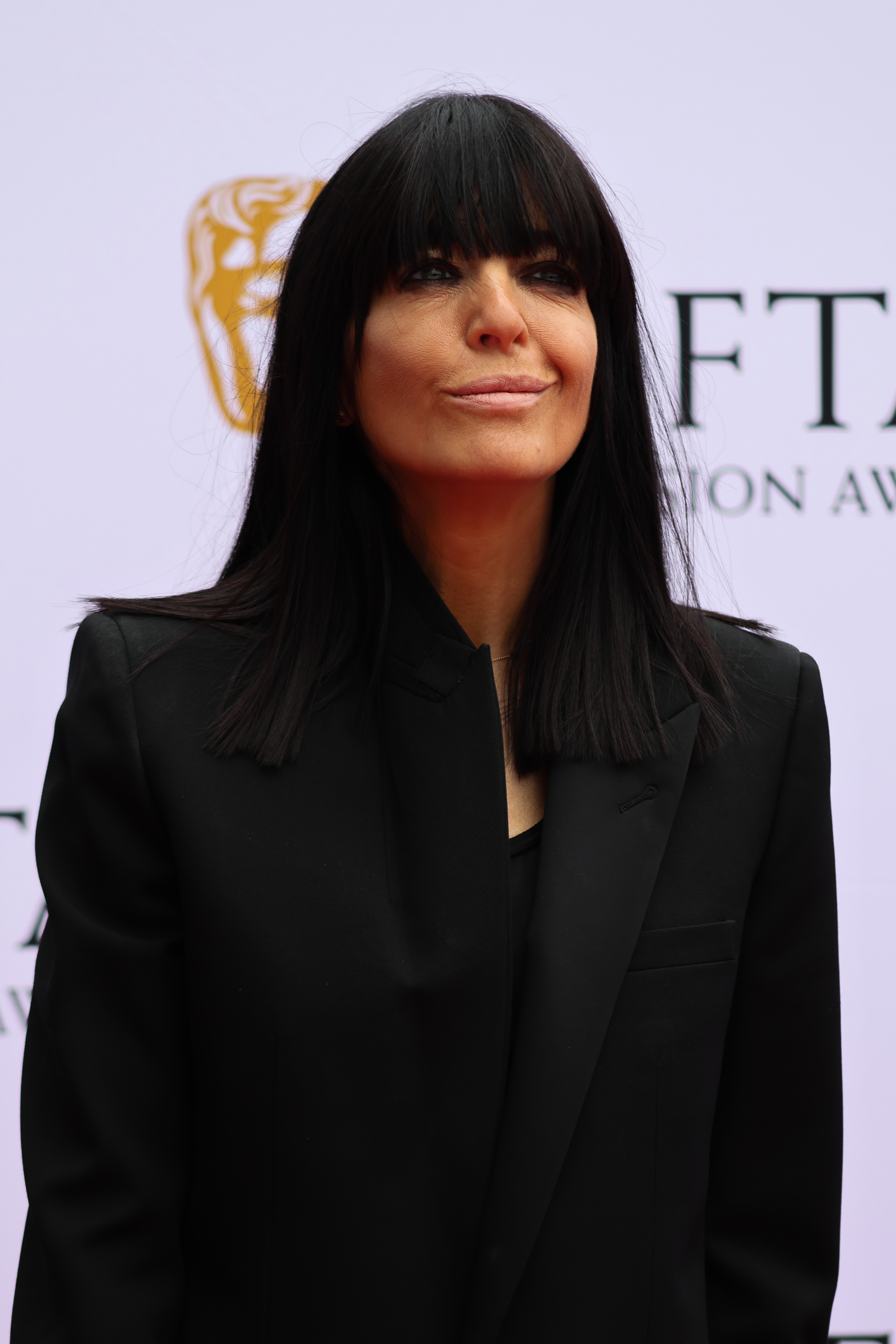
Claudia Winkleman

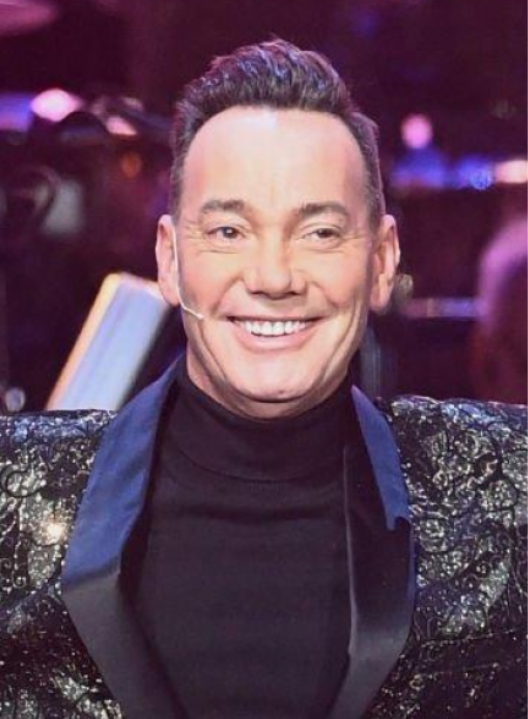
Craig Revel Horwood

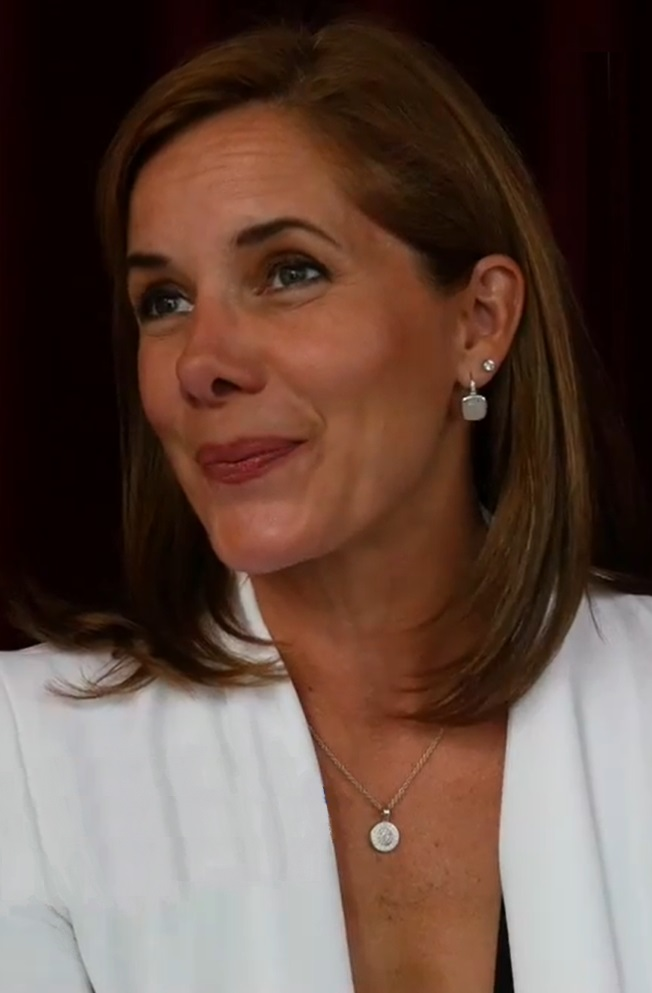
Darcey Bussell

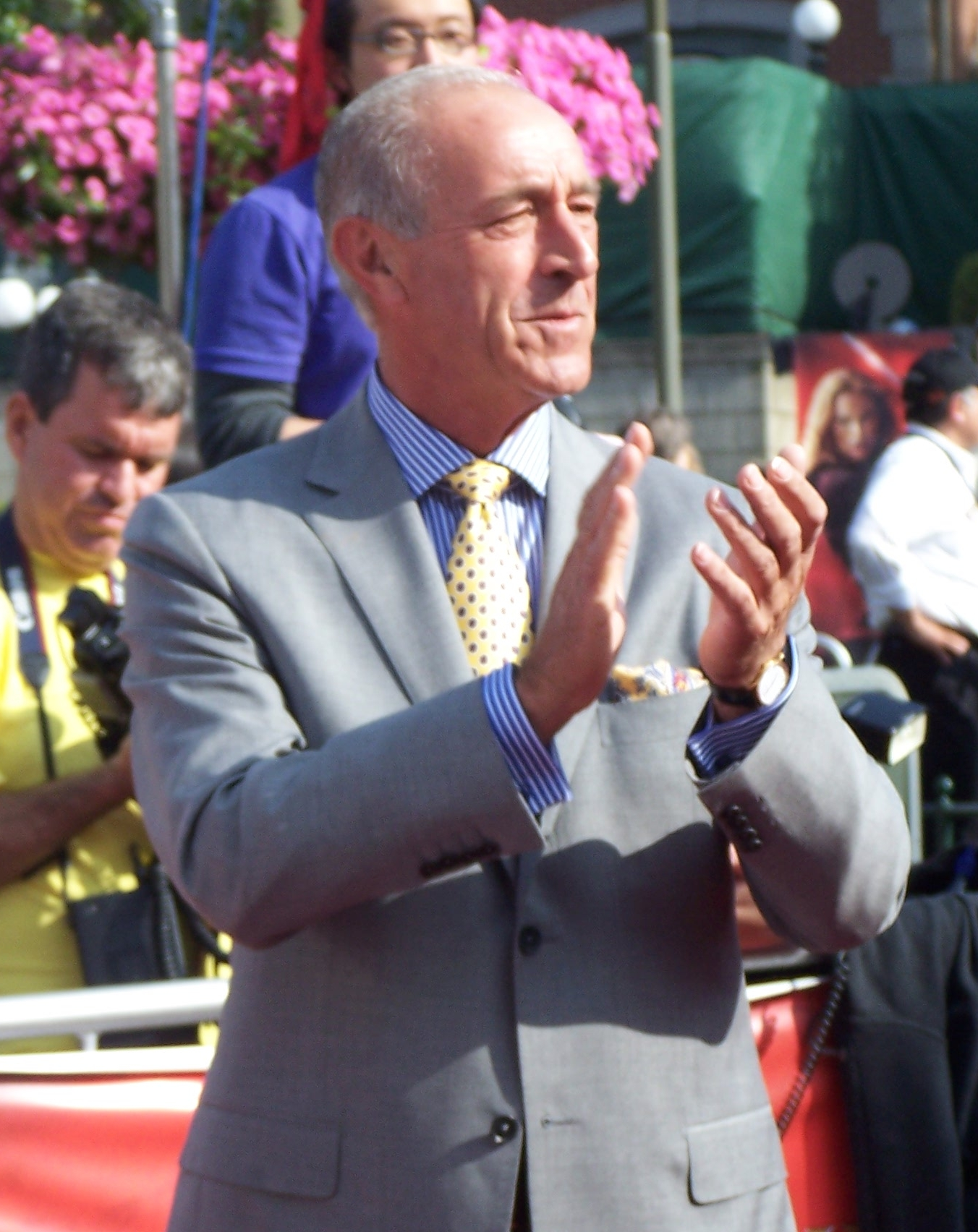
Len Goodman

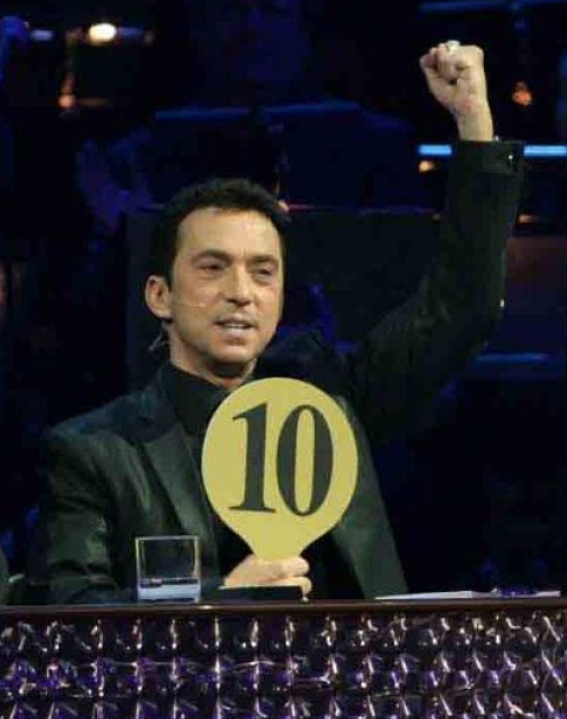
Bruno Tonioli

The couples dance each week in a live show. The judges score each performance out of ten. The couples are then ranked according to the judges' scores and given points according to their rank, with the lowest scored couple receiving one point, and the highest scored couple receiving the most points (the maximum number of points available depends on the number of couples remaining in the competition). The public are also invited to vote for their favourite couples, and the couples are ranked again according to the number of votes they receive, again receiving points; the couple with the fewest votes receiving one point, and the couple with the most votes receiving the most points.

The points for judges' score and public vote are then added together, and the two couples with the fewest points are placed in the bottom two. If two couples have equal points, the points from the public vote are given precedence. As with the previous series, the bottom two couples have to perform a dance-off on the results show. Based on that performance alone, each judge then votes on which couple should stay and which couple should leave, with Len Goodman, as head judge, having the last and deciding vote.

== Professional dancers ==
On 1 June 2013, it was revealed that Erin Boag, Flavia Cacace, Vincent Simone, and Aliona Vilani would all be leaving the show. They were replaced by four new professionals: Iveta Lukošiūtė, Janette Manrara, Aljaž Škorjanec, and Emma Slater. However, on 22 August 2013, it was announced that Slater would move to the Dancing with the Stars and that she would be replaced by Anya Garnis. It was also confirmed that Kevin Clifton would join the show, bringing the total number of couples to fifteen. On 2 September 2013 it was reported that professional dancer Natalie Lowe had injured her foot and would be replaced by Aliona Vilani.

== Couples ==
This series featured fifteen celebrity contestants. The full line up was revealed on The One Show on 2 September 2013. The celebrities did not know their professional partners until they were introduced to each other on the launch show on 7 September 2013.

Celebrity	Notability	Professional partner	Status
Tony Jacklin	Professional golfer	Aliona Vilani	Eliminated 1st on 6 October 2013
Vanessa Feltz	Television & radio presenter	James Jordan	Eliminated 2nd on 13 October 2013
Julien Macdonald	Fashion designer	Janette Manrara	Eliminated 3rd on 20 October 2013
Deborah Meaden	Dragons' Den investor & businesswoman	Robin Windsor	Eliminated 4th on 27 October 2013
Rachel Riley	Countdown presenter	Pasha Kovalev	Eliminated 5th on 3 November 2013
Dave Myers	Chef & The Hairy Bikers presenter	Karen Hauer	Eliminated 6th on 10 November 2013
Fiona Fullerton	Film & television actress	Anton Du Beke	Eliminated 7th on 17 November 2013
Ben Cohen	England rugby player	Kristina Rihanoff	Eliminated 8th on 24 November 2013
Mark Benton	Stage & screen actor	Iveta Lukošiūtė	Eliminated 9th on 1 December 2013
Ashley Taylor Dawson	Hollyoaks actor & singer	Ola Jordan	Eliminated 10th on 8 December 2013
Patrick Robinson	Casualty actor	Anya Garnis	Eliminated 11th on 15 December 2013
Sophie Ellis-Bextor	Singer-songwriter	Brendan Cole	Fourth place on 21 December 2013
Natalie Gumede	Coronation Street actress	Artem Chigvintsev	Runners-up on 21 December 2013
Susanna Reid	BBC Breakfast presenter	Kevin Clifton	Runners-up on 21 December 2013
Abbey Clancy	Model & television presenter	Aljaž Škorjanec	Winners on 21 December 2013

== Scoring chart ==
The highest score each week is indicated in bold green with a dagger (†), while the lowest score each week is indicated in italicized red with a double-dagger (‡).

Color key:

Winners
Runners-up
Fourth place
Bottom two
Excused from competition for the week
Eliminated

Strictly Come Dancing (series 11) - Weekly scores
Couple	Pl.	Week														
Couple	Pl.	1	2	1+2	3	4	5	6	7	8	9	10	11	12	13	
Couple	Pl.	1	2	1+2	3	4	5	6	7	8	9	10	11	12	Show 1	Show 2
Abbey & Aljaž	1st	**32**†	30	62	28	**35**†	**35**†	34 (Note: This couple was in the bottom two, but was not eliminated.)	36	37	32	**40**†	37+3=40	39+39=**78**†	40+38=78	+38=116 (Note: This couple finished in first place.)
Natalie & Artem	2nd	31	34	**65**†	**36**†	**35**†	**35**†	**38**†	(Note: This couple was excused from competition due to illness or injury, and was granted a bye to the following week.)	**39**†	**37**†	36	35+6=**41**†	40+38=**78**†	39+40=**79**†	+40=**119**† (Note: This couple finished in second place.)
Susanna & Kevin	2nd	28	31	59	34	29	32	34	36	**39**†	31	33	32+1=33‡	38+32=70	37+36=73‡	+39=112‡
Sophie & Brendan	4th	28	**36**†	64	31	**35**†	30	28	32	34	31	36	34+4=38	35+36=71	39+35=74 (Note: This couple was eliminated.)	
Patrick & Anya	5th	28	27	55	27	33	28	34	**37**†	35	32	38	36+5=**41**†	36+33=69‡		
Ashley & Ola	6th	25	32	57	31	31	31	33	35	35	35	35	35+2=37			
Mark & Iveta	7th	24	22	46	26	26	28	25	23	29‡	28	29‡				
Ben & Kristina	8th	19	25	44	28	31	27	32	26	32	27‡					
Fiona & Anton	9th	24	22	46	28	22‡	30	28	26	29‡						
Dave & Karen	10th	16‡	17	33	16‡	23	17‡	19‡	20‡							
Rachel & Pasha	11th	27	20	47	27	26	22	30								
Deborah & Robin	12th	24	24	48	28	23	27									
Julien & Janette	13th	20	18	38	22	23										
Vanessa & James	14th	19	23	42	20											
Tony & Aliona	15th	16‡	13‡	29‡												

=== Average chart ===
This table only counts for dances scored on a traditional 40-point scale.

Couple	Rank by average	Total points	Number of dances	Total average
Natalie & Artem	1st	553	15	36.9
Abbey & Aljaž	2nd	570	16	35.6
Susanna & Kevin	3rd	541	16	33.8
Sophie & Brendan	4th	500	15	33.3
Patrick & Anya	5th	424	13	32.6
Ashley & Ola	6th	358	11	32.5
Ben & Kristina	7th	247	9	27.4
Fiona & Anton	8th	209	8	26.1
Mark & Iveta	9th	260	10	26.0
Rachel & Pasha	10th	152	6	25.3
Deborah & Robin	11th	126	5	25.2
Julian & Janette	12th	83	4	20.8
Vanessa & James	13th	62	3	20.7
Dave & Karen	14th	128	7	18.3
Tony & Aliona	15th	29	2	14.5

== Weekly scores ==
Unless indicated otherwise, individual judges scores in the charts below (given in parentheses) are listed in this order from left to right: Craig Revel Horwood, Darcey Bussell, Len Goodman, Bruno Tonioli.

=== Week 1 ===
Six of the couples performed on the first night and the other nine couples performed on the second night. There was no elimination this week; all scores and votes carried over to the following week. Couples are listed in the order they performed.

Night 1 (Friday)

Couple	Scores	Dance	Music
Ashley & Ola	25 (5, 6, 7, 7)	Cha-cha-cha	"What Makes You Beautiful" — One Direction
Tony & Aliona	16 (2, 5, 5, 4)	Waltz	"What'll I Do" — Alison Krauss
Mark & Iveta	24 (5, 6, 7, 6)	Tango	"Hernando's Hideaway" — Alma Cogan
Susanna & Kevin	28 (6, 7, 8, 7)	Jive	"Shake a Tail Feather" — The Blues Brothers
Sophie & Brendan	28 (7, 7, 7, 7)	Waltz	"Moon River" — Audrey Hepburn
Natalie & Artem	31 (8, 8, 8, 7)	Cha-cha-cha	"Rasputin" — Boney M.

Night 2 (Saturday)

Couple	Scores	Dance	Music
Ben & Kristina	19 (3, 5, 6, 5)	Cha-cha-cha	"Love Me Again" — John Newman
Fiona & Anton	24 (5, 6, 7, 6)	Tango	"A View to a Kill" — Duran Duran
Dave & Karen	16 (2, 5, 5, 4)	Cha-cha-cha	"Moves Like Jagger" — Maroon 5 & Christina Aguilera
Rachel & Pasha	27 (6, 7, 7, 7)	Waltz	"When I Need You" — Luther Vandross
Julien & Janette	20 (3, 5, 6, 6)	Cha-cha-cha	"Vogue" — Madonna
Deborah & Robin	24 (6, 6, 6, 6)	Tango	"Money, Money, Money" — ABBA
Patrick & Anya	28 (7, 7, 7, 7)	Jive	"Runaway Baby" — Bruno Mars
Vanessa & James	19 (3, 5, 6, 5)	Cha-cha-cha	"That Don't Impress Me Much" — Shania Twain
Abbey & Aljaž	32 (8, 8, 8, 8)	Waltz	"Kissing You" — Des'ree

=== Week 2 ===
Musical guest: Matt Goss — "When Will I Be Famous?"

Couples are listed in the order they performed.

Couple	Scores	Dance	Music	Result
Susanna & Kevin	31 (7, 8, 8, 8)	Tango	"Locked Out of Heaven" — Bruno Mars	Safe
Tony & Aliona	13 (2, 4, 4, 3)	Charleston	"It Don't Mean a Thing (If It Ain't Got That Swing)" — Duke Ellington	Eliminated
Natalie & Artem	34 (8, 9, 8, 9)	Waltz	"If I Ain't Got You" — Alicia Keys	Safe
Dave & Karen	17 (3, 5, 5, 4)	American Smooth	"How D'Ya Like Your Eggs in the Morning?" — Dean Martin	Safe
Patrick & Anya	27 (6, 7, 7, 7)	Tango	"Beat It" — Michael Jackson	Safe
Deborah & Robin	24 (5, 7, 6, 6)	Cha-cha-cha	"Respect" — Aretha Franklin	Safe
Rachel & Pasha	20 (4, 5, 6, 5)	Salsa	"Get Lucky" — Daft Punk & Pharrell Williams	Safe
Vanessa & James	23 (5, 6, 6, 6)	Waltz	"Run to You" — Whitney Houston	Safe
Julien & Janette	18 (3, 5, 5, 5)	Tango	"Applause" — Lady Gaga	Bottom two
Fiona & Anton	22 (6, 6, 5, 5)	Cha-cha-cha	"Beggin'" — Madcon	Safe
Mark & Iveta	22 (4, 6, 7, 5)	Salsa	"Bom Bom" — Sam and the Womp	Safe
Sophie & Brendan	36 (9, 9, 9, 9)	Charleston	"Rock It for Me" — Caravan Palace	Safe
Ben & Kristina	25 (6, 6, 7, 6)	Waltz	"What the World Needs Now Is Love" — Dionne Warwick	Safe
Abbey & Aljaž	30 (7, 7, 8, 8)	Cha-cha-cha	"Let's Get Loud" — Jennifer Lopez	Safe
Ashley & Ola	32 (7, 9, 8, 8)	American Smooth	"Beyond the Sea" — Bobby Darin	Safe

Judges' votes to save

- Horwood: Julien & Janette
- Bussell: Julien & Janette
- Tonioli: Julien & Janette
- Goodman: Did not vote, but would have voted to save Julien & Janette

=== Week 3: Love Week ===
Musical guest: Andrea Bocelli — "When I Fall in Love"

Couples are listed in the order they performed.

Couple	Scores	Dance	Music	Result
Abbey & Aljaž	28 (6, 7, 8, 7)	Jive	"Can't Buy Me Love" — The Beatles	Safe
Patrick & Anya	27 (6, 7, 7, 7)	Foxtrot	"Let There Be Love" — Nat King Cole	Safe
Dave & Karen	16 (2, 5, 5, 4)	Paso doble	"I'd Do Anything for Love (But I Won't Do That)" — Meat Loaf	Safe
Fiona & Anton	28 (7, 7, 7, 7)	Waltz	"True Love" — Pat Boone	Safe
Rachel & Pasha	27 (6, 7, 7, 7)	Cha-cha-cha	"When Love Takes Over" — David Guetta & Kelly Rowland	Safe
Mark & Iveta	26 (6, 6, 7, 7)	American Smooth	"It Must Be Love" — Madness	Safe
Ben & Kristina	28 (7, 7, 7, 7)	Rumba	"Make You Feel My Love" — Adele	Safe
Sophie & Brendan	31 (7, 8, 8, 8)	Samba	"All Night Long (All Night)" — Lionel Richie	Safe
Julien & Janette	22 (4, 5, 7, 6)	Jive	"Everybody Needs Somebody to Love" — The Blues Brothers	Bottom two
Susanna & Kevin	34 (8, 9, 9, 8)	Viennese waltz	"Annie's Song" — John Denver	Safe
Vanessa & James	20 (3, 5, 6, 6)	Tango	"Lay All Your Love on Me" — ABBA	Eliminated
Ashley & Ola	31 (8, 8, 7, 8)	Samba	"Love Is in the Air" — John Paul Young	Safe
Natalie & Artem	36 (9, 9, 9, 9)	Rumba	"Love the Way You Lie (Part II)" — Rihanna	Safe
Deborah & Robin	28 (7, 7, 7, 7)	Quickstep	"(Your Love Keeps Lifting Me) Higher and Higher" — Jackie Wilson	Safe

Judges' votes to save

- Horwood: Julien & Janette
- Bussell: Julien & Janette
- Tonioli: Julien & Janette
- Goodman: Did not vote, but would have voted to save Julien & Janette

=== Week 4 ===
Musical guests:

- Andrea Begley — "Dancing in the Dark"
- Keane — "Everybody's Changing"

Couples are listed in the order they performed.

Couple	Scores	Dance	Music	Result
Sophie & Brendan	35 (8, 9, 9, 9)	Foxtrot	"Cheek to Cheek" — Irving Berlin	Safe
Fiona & Anton	22 (4, 6, 6, 6)	Rumba	"World of Our Own" — Westlife	Safe
Mark & Iveta	26 (3, 8, 8, 7)	Cha-cha-cha	"U Can't Touch This" — MC Hammer	Safe
Ashley & Ola	31 (7, 8, 8, 8)	Viennese waltz	"Angel" — Sarah McLachlan	Safe
Julien & Janette	23 (4, 6, 7, 6)	Salsa	"Spice Up Your Life" — Spice Girls	Eliminated
Rachel & Pasha	26 (5, 7, 7, 7)	Quickstep	"Johnny Got a Boom Boom" — Imelda May	Bottom two
Ben & Kristina	31 (8, 8, 8, 7)	Salsa	"Hard to Handle" — The Black Crowes	Safe
Deborah & Robin	23 (5, 6, 6, 6)	Jive	"Making Your Mind Up" — Bucks Fizz	Safe
Natalie & Artem	35 (9, 9, 8, 9)	Quickstep	"Yeah!" — Usher	Safe
Patrick & Anya	33 (8, 8, 9, 8)	Cha-cha-cha	"Mercy" — Duffy	Safe
Abbey & Aljaž	35 (9, 8, 9, 9)	Tango	"Spectrum" — Florence and the Machine	Safe
Dave & Karen	23 (5, 6, 6, 6)	Waltz	"Take It to the Limit" — Eagles	Safe
Susanna & Kevin	29 (6, 7, 8, 8)	Samba	"Whenever, Wherever" — Shakira	Safe

Judges' votes to save

- Horwood: Rachel & Pasha
- Bussell: Rachel & Pasha
- Tonioli: Rachel & Pasha
- Goodman: Did not vote, but would have voted to save Rachel & Pasha

=== Week 5 ===
Musical guests: Earth, Wind and Fire — "Let's Groove", "My Promise" & "Boogie Wonderland"

Couples are listed in the order they performed.

Couple	Scores	Dance	Music	Result
Natalie & Artem	35 (8, 9, 9, 9)	Samba	"Bamboleo" — Gipsy Kings	Safe
Abbey & Aljaž	35 (8, 9, 9, 9)	Foxtrot	"Dear Darlin'" — Olly Murs	Safe
Dave & Karen	17 (3, 5, 5, 4)	Salsa	"Cuban Pete" — Jim Carrey	Safe
Deborah & Robin	27 (6, 7, 7, 7)	Viennese waltz	"It's a Man's Man's Man's World" — James Brown	Eliminated
Patrick & Anya	28 (6, 8, 7, 7)	Salsa	"Wings" — Little Mix	Bottom two
Fiona & Anton	30 (7, 7, 8, 8)	Quickstep	"If My Friends Could See Me Now" — Sammy Davis Jr.	Safe
Rachel & Pasha	22 (4, 6, 6, 6)	Paso doble	"Maneater" — Nelly Furtado	Safe
Mark & Iveta	28 (7, 7, 7, 7)	Waltz	"Apologize" — OneRepublic	Safe
Ashley & Ola	31 (7, 8, 8, 8)	Jive	"Johnny B. Goode" — Chuck Berry	Safe
Susanna & Kevin	32 (8, 8, 8, 8)	American Smooth	"On the Sunny Side of the Street" — Tony Bennett	Safe
Ben & Kristina	27 (6, 7, 7, 7)	Quickstep	"I'll Be There for You" — The Rembrandts	Safe
Sophie & Brendan	30 (7, 8, 7, 8)	Cha-cha-cha	"P.Y.T. (Pretty Young Thing)" — Michael Jackson	Safe

Judges' votes to save

- Horwood: Patrick & Anya
- Bussell: Patrick & Anya
- Tonioli: Patrick & Anya
- Goodman: Did not vote, but would have voted to save Patrick & Anya

=== Week 6: Halloween Week ===
Musical guest: Madness — "La Luna"

Couples are listed in the order they performed.

Couple	Scores	Dance	Music	Result
Patrick & Anya	34 (8, 9, 9, 8)	Quickstep	"Man with the Hex" — The Atomic Fireballs	Safe
Fiona & Anton	28 (6, 7, 8, 7)	Charleston	"Jeepers Creepers" — Paula Kelly	Safe
Ben & Kristina	32 (7, 8, 9, 8)	Paso doble	"Supermassive Black Hole" — Muse	Safe
Sophie & Brendan	28 (6, 7, 8, 7)	Jive	"Maneater" — Hall & Oates	Safe
Natalie & Artem	38 (9, 10, 9, 10)	Viennese waltz	"Devil in Me" — Natalie Duncan	Safe
Mark & Iveta	25 (6, 6, 7, 6)	Paso doble	"I Lost My Heart to a Starship Trooper" — Sarah Brightman	Safe
Rachel & Pasha	30 (7, 7, 8, 8)	American Smooth	"I Put a Spell on You" — Screamin' Jay Hawkins	Eliminated
Ashley & Ola	33 (8, 9, 8, 8)	Tango	"Beautiful Monster" — Ne-Yo	Safe
Abbey & Aljaž	34 (8, 8, 9, 9)	Rumba	"Stay" — Shakespears Sister	Bottom two
Dave & Karen	19 (4, 5, 6, 4)	Jive	"Monster Mash" — Bobby "Boris" Pickett	Safe
Susanna & Kevin	34 (8, 8, 9, 9)	Charleston	"Bad Moon Rising" — Creedence Clearwater Revival	Safe

Judges' votes to save

- Horwood: Abbey & Aljaž
- Bussell: Abbey & Aljaž
- Tonioli: Abbey & Aljaž
- Goodman: Did not vote, but would have voted to save Abbey & Aljaž

=== Week 7 ===
Musical guests:

- The Puppini Sisters — "Sing, Sing, Sing"
- The Tenors — "Forever Young"

Natalie Gumede fainted during dress rehearsals and was unable to perform on the live show. Under the rules of the show, she was granted a bye to the following week.

Couples are listed in the order they performed.

Couple	Scores	Dance	Music	Result
Ben & Kristina	26 (4, 7, 8, 7)	Jive	"Jump, Jive an' Wail" — Louis Prima	Safe
Fiona & Anton	26 (5, 7, 7, 7)	Paso doble	"Song 2" — Blur	Safe
Abbey & Aljaž	36 (9, 9, 9, 9)	Charleston	"Cabaret" — Liza Minnelli	Safe
Mark & Iveta	23 (5, 6, 7, 5)	Rumba	"Goldfinger" — Shirley Bassey	Bottom two
Susanna & Kevin	36 (9, 9, 9, 9)	Waltz	"You Light Up My Life" — Whitney Houston	Safe
Dave & Karen	20 (4, 6, 6, 4)	Tango	"I'm Gonna Be (500 Miles)" — The Proclaimers	Eliminated
Ashley & Ola	35 (8, 9, 9, 9)	Quickstep	"Are You Gonna Be My Girl" — Jet	Safe
Sophie & Brendan	32 (8, 8, 8, 8)	Argentine tango	"Sweet Dreams (Are Made of This)" — Tanghetto	Safe
Patrick & Anya	37 (9, 10, 9, 9)	American Smooth	"It Had to Be You" — Harry Connick Jr.	Safe

Judges' votes to save

- Horwood: Mark & Iveta
- Bussell: Mark & Iveta
- Tonioli: Mark & Iveta
- Goodman: Did not vote, but would have voted to save Dave & Karen

=== Week 8: Blackpool Week ===
Musical guests: André Rieu & JLS — "Billion Lights"

This week's episode was staged in the Tower Ballroom at the Blackpool Tower in Blackpool, Lancashire. Couples are listed in the order they performed.

Couple	Scores	Dance	Music	Result
Sophie & Brendan	34 (7, 9, 9, 9)	Quickstep	"The Lady Is a Tramp" — Shirley Bassey	Safe
Patrick & Anya	35 (8, 9, 9, 9)	Samba	"Copacabana" — Barry Manilow	Safe
Ben & Kristina	32 (8, 8, 8, 8)	American Smooth	"Fallin'" — Alicia Keys	Safe
Ashley & Ola	35 (8, 9, 9, 9)	Paso doble	"You Give Love a Bad Name" — Bon Jovi	Safe
Fiona & Anton	29 (6, 7, 8, 8)	American Smooth	"Come Fly with Me" — Frank Sinatra	Eliminated
Abbey & Aljaž	37 (7, 10, 10, 10)	Quickstep	"Walking on Sunshine" — Katrina and the Waves	Safe
Mark & Iveta	29 (5, 8, 8, 8)	Jive	"You Can't Stop the Beat" — from Hairspray	Bottom two
Susanna & Kevin	39 (9, 10, 10, 10)	Paso doble	"Les Toreadors" — Georges Bizet	Safe
Natalie & Artem	39 (9, 10, 10, 10)	Charleston	"Bang Bang" — will.i.am	Safe

Judges' votes to save

- Horwood: Fiona & Anton
- Bussell: Mark & Iveta
- Tonioli: Mark & Iveta
- Goodman: Mark & Iveta

=== Week 9 ===
Musical guest: Il Divo — "Tonight"

Couples are listed in the order they performed.

Couple	Scores	Dance	Music	Result
Susanna & Kevin	31 (7, 8, 8, 8)	Cha-cha-cha	"Hound Dog" — from Smokey Joe's Cafe	Safe
Ashley & Ola	35 (8, 9, 9, 9)	Waltz	"I Will Always Love You" — Whitney Houston	Safe
Natalie & Artem	37 (9, 9, 9, 10)	Tango	"Where Have You Been" — Rihanna	Safe
Mark & Iveta	28 (6, 8, 7, 7)	Foxtrot	"It's a Beautiful Day" — Michael Bublé	Bottom two
Sophie & Brendan	31 (7, 8, 8, 8)	Rumba	"Will You Love Me Tomorrow" — Amy Winehouse	Safe
Ben & Kristina	27 (6, 7, 7, 7)	Charleston	"No Diggity" — Minimatic	Eliminated
Abbey & Aljaž	32 (8, 8, 8, 8)	Paso doble	"You've Got the Love" — Florence and the Machine	Safe
Patrick & Anya	32 (8, 8, 8, 8)	Viennese waltz	"A New Day Has Come" — Celine Dion	Safe

Judges' votes to save

- Horwood: Ben & Kristina
- Bussell: Mark & Iveta
- Tonioli: Mark & Iveta
- Goodman: Mark & Iveta

=== Week 10: Musicals Week ===
Musical guest: Alfie Boe — "Bring Him Home" (from Les Misérables)

Couples are listed in the order they performed.

Couple	Scores	Dance	Music	Musical	Result
Patrick & Anya	38 (8, 10, 10, 10)	Charleston	"Chitty Chitty Bang Bang"	Chitty Chitty Bang Bang	Safe
Natalie & Artem	36 (9, 9, 8, 10)	American Smooth	"And I Am Telling You I'm Not Going"	Dreamgirls	Safe
Mark & Iveta	29 (7, 7, 7, 8)	Samba	"I Just Can't Wait to Be King"	The Lion King	Eliminated
Sophie & Brendan	36 (9, 9, 9, 9)	Viennese waltz	"My Favorite Things"	The Sound of Music	Safe
Abbey & Aljaž	40 (10, 10, 10, 10)	Salsa	"You Should Be Dancing"	Saturday Night Fever	Safe
Ashley & Ola	35 (8, 9, 9, 9)	Rumba	"A Whole New World"	Aladdin	Bottom two
Susanna & Kevin	33 (7, 8, 9, 9)	Quickstep	"Good Morning"	Singin' in the Rain	Safe

Judges' votes to save

- Horwood: Ashley & Ola
- Bussell: Ashley & Ola
- Tonioli: Ashley & Ola
- Goodman: Did not vote, but would have voted to save Ashley & Ola

=== Week 11: Quarter-final ===
Musical guest: The Saturdays — "What About Us"

Each couple performed one routine, and then all couples participated in a swing dance marathon for additional points. Couples are listed in the order they performed.

Couple	Scores	Dance	Music	Result
Ashley & Ola	35 (8, 9, 9, 9)	Salsa	"Conga" — Gloria Estefan	Eliminated
Natalie & Artem	35 (9, 9, 8, 9)	Paso doble	"El Gato Montes" — Ramon Cortez Pasodoble Orchestra	Safe
Patrick & Anya	36 (8, 10, 9, 9)	Rumba	"When I Was Your Man" — Bruno Mars	Bottom two
Susanna & Kevin	32 (8, 8, 8, 8)	Argentine tango	"Smooth Criminal" — Michael Jackson	Safe
Abbey & Aljaž	37 (9, 9, 9, 10)	Viennese waltz	"Delilah" — Tom Jones	Safe
Sophie & Brendan	34 (9, 8, 8, 9)	Tango	"Material Girl" — Madonna	Safe
Susanna & Kevin	1	Swing-a-thon (Swing Marathon)	"Do You Love Me" — The Contours	
Ashley & Ola	2	Swing-a-thon (Swing Marathon)	"Do You Love Me" — The Contours	
Abbey & Aljaž	3	Swing-a-thon (Swing Marathon)	"Do You Love Me" — The Contours	
Sophie & Brendan	4	Swing-a-thon (Swing Marathon)	"Do You Love Me" — The Contours	
Patrick & Anya	5	Swing-a-thon (Swing Marathon)	"Do You Love Me" — The Contours	
Natalie & Artem	6	Swing-a-thon (Swing Marathon)	"Do You Love Me" — The Contours	

Judges' votes to save

- Horwood: Patrick & Anya
- Bussell: Patrick & Anya
- Tonioli: Patrick & Anya
- Goodman: Did not vote, but would have voted to save Ashley & Ola

=== Week 12: Semi-final ===
Musical guest: Celine Dion — "Breakaway"

Each couple performed two routines, and are listed in the order they performed.

Couple	Scores	Dance	Music	Result
Natalie & Artem	40 (10, 10, 10, 10)	Salsa	"Wanna Be Startin' Somethin'" — Michael Jackson	Bottom two
Natalie & Artem	38 (9, 9, 10, 10)	Argentine tango	"Montserrat" — Bajofondo	Bottom two
Patrick & Anya	36 (9, 9, 9, 9)	Waltz	"Unchained Melody" — The Righteous Brothers	Eliminated
Patrick & Anya	33 (7, 8, 9, 9)	Paso doble	"Because the Night" — Patti Smith	Eliminated
Sophie & Brendan	35 (8, 9, 9, 9)	Paso doble	"Montagues and Capulets" — Sergei Prokofiev	Safe
Sophie & Brendan	36 (8, 9, 9, 10)	American Smooth	"They Can't Take That Away From Me" — Lisa Stansfield	Safe
Susanna & Kevin	38 (9, 9, 10, 10)	Foxtrot	"Can't Take My Eyes Off You" — Frankie Valli	Safe
Susanna & Kevin	32 (8, 8, 8, 8)	Salsa	"Move Your Feet" — Junior Senior	Safe
Abbey & Aljaž	39 (9, 10, 10, 10)	Samba	"Faith" — George Michael	Safe
Abbey & Aljaž	39 (9, 10, 10, 10)	American Smooth	"Sweet Caroline" — Neil Diamond	Safe

Judges' votes to save

- Horwood: Natalie & Artem
- Bussell: Natalie & Artem
- Tonioli: Natalie & Artem
- Goodman: Did not vote, but would have voted to save Natalie & Artem

=== Week 13: Final ===
Musical guest: Robbie Williams —"Puttin' On the Ritz"

During the first show, each couple performed two routines, one of which was their showdance routine and the other chosen by the judges. At the beginning of the second show, the couple with the lowest public vote was eliminated. During the second show, each couple performed their favourite dance of the series. Couples are listed in the order they performed.

Show 1

Couple	Scores	Dance	Music	Result
Susanna & Kevin	37 (8, 9, 10, 10)	Quickstep	"Good Morning" — from Singin' in the Rain	Safe
Susanna & Kevin	36 (9, 9, 9, 9)	Showdance	"Your Song" — Ewan McGregor	Safe
Abbey & Aljaž	40 (10, 10, 10, 10)	Waltz	"Kissing You" — Des'ree	Safe
Abbey & Aljaž	38 (9, 10, 9, 10)	Showdance	"Sweet Child o' Mine" — Guns N' Roses	Safe
Natalie & Artem	39 (9, 10, 10, 10)	Cha-cha-cha	"Rasputin" — Boney M.	Safe
Natalie & Artem	40 (10, 10, 10, 10)	Showdance	"Steppin' Out with My Baby" — Tony Bennett	Safe
Sophie & Brendan	39 (9, 10, 10, 10)	Viennese waltz	"My Favorite Things" — from The Sound of Music	Fourth place
Sophie & Brendan	35 (8, 9, 9, 9)	Showdance	"I Wanna Dance With Somebody" — Whitney Houston	Fourth place

Show 2

Couple	Scores	Dance	Music	Result
Susanna & Kevin	39 (9, 10, 10, 10)	Paso doble	"Les Toreadors" — Georges Bizet	Runners-up
Abbey & Aljaž	38 (9, 10, 9, 10)	Quickstep	"Walking on Sunshine" — Katrina and the Waves	Winners
Natalie & Artem	40 (10, 10, 10, 10)	American Smooth	"And I Am Telling You I'm Not Going" — from Dreamgirls	Runners-up

== Dance chart ==
The couples performed the following each week:

- Weeks 1–10: One unlearned dance
- Week 11: One unlearned dance & swing dance marathon
- Week 12: Two unlearned dances
- Week 13 (Show 1): Judges' choice & showdance
- Week 13 (Show 2): Favourite dance of the series

Strictly Come Dancing (series 11) - Dance chart
Couple	Week																
Couple	1	2	3	4	5	6	7	8	9	10	11		12		13		
Abbey & Aljaž	Waltz	Cha-cha-cha	Jive	Tango	Foxtrot	Rumba	Charleston	Quickstep	Paso doble	Salsa	Viennese waltz	Swing; Marathon	Samba	American Smooth	Waltz	Showdance	Quickstep
Natalie & Artem	Cha-cha-cha	Waltz	Rumba	Quickstep	Samba	Viennese waltz	Jive	Charleston	Tango	American Smooth	Paso doble	Swing; Marathon	Salsa	Argentine tango	Cha-cha-cha	Showdance	American Smooth
Susanna & Kevin	Jive	Tango	Viennese waltz	Samba	American Smooth	Charleston	Waltz	Paso doble	Cha-cha-cha	Quickstep	Argentine tango	Swing; Marathon	Foxtrot	Salsa	Quickstep	Showdance	Paso doble
Sophie & Brendan	Waltz	Charleston	Samba	Foxtrot	Cha-cha-cha	Jive	Argentine tango	Quickstep	Rumba	Viennese waltz	Tango	Swing; Marathon	Paso doble	American Smooth	Viennese waltz	Showdance	
Patrick & Anya	Jive	Tango	Foxtrot	Cha-cha-cha	Salsa	Quickstep	American Smooth	Samba	Viennese waltz	Charleston	Rumba	Swing; Marathon	Waltz	Paso doble			
Ashley & Ola	Cha-cha-cha	American Smooth	Samba	Viennese waltz	Jive	Tango	Quickstep	Paso doble	Waltz	Rumba	Salsa	Swing; Marathon					
Mark & Iveta	Tango	Salsa	American Smooth	Cha-cha-cha	Waltz	Paso doble	Rumba	Jive	Foxtrot	Samba							
Ben & Kristina	Cha-cha-cha	Waltz	Rumba	Salsa	Quickstep	Paso doble	Jive	American Smooth	Charleston								
Fiona & Anton	Tango	Cha-cha-cha	Waltz	Rumba	Quickstep	Charleston	Paso doble	American Smooth									
Dave & Karen	Cha-cha-cha	American Smooth	Paso doble	Waltz	Salsa	Jive	Tango										
Rachel & Pasha	Waltz	Salsa	Cha-cha-cha	Quickstep	Paso doble	American Smooth											
Deborah & Robin	Tango	Cha-cha-cha	Quickstep	Jive	Viennese waltz												
Julien & Janette	Cha-cha-cha	Tango	Jive	Salsa													
Vanessa & James	Cha-cha-cha	Waltz	Tango														
Tony & Aliona	Waltz	Charleston															

== Ratings ==
Weekly ratings for each show on BBC One. All ratings are provided by BARB.

Episode	Date	Official rating (millions)	Weekly rank for BBC One	Weekly rank for all UK TV	Share
Launch show	7 September	9.53	1	1	41.3%
Week 1 (Night 1)	27 September	9.33	2	3	35.2%
Week 1 (Night 2)	28 September	10.53	1	1	43.4%
Week 2	5 October	10.33	1	1	42.1%
Week 2 results	6 October	8.85	2	3	33.2%
Week 3	12 October	10.90	1	1	43.1%
Week 3 results	13 October	8.95	2	4	31.9%
Week 4	19 October	10.85	1	1	43.9%
Week 4 results	20 October	10.02	2	2	38.4%
Week 5	26 October	10.66	1	1	44.4%
Week 5 results	27 October	10.19	2	2	37.8%
Week 6	2 November	11.09	1	1	44.0%
Week 6 results	3 November	10.59	2	2	38.7%
Week 7	9 November	11.26	1	1	43.1%
Week 7 results	10 November	10.79	2	2	39.9%
Week 8	16 November	11.46	1	1	44.0%
Week 8 results	17 November	10.17	2	3	34.7%
Week 9	23 November	11.48	2	2	43.7%
Week 9 results	24 November	10.61	3	3	39.0%
Week 10	30 November	11.38	1	1	42.9%
Week 10 results	1 December	10.75	2	2	40.4%
Week 11	7 December	11.84	1	1	44.7%
Week 11 results	8 December	10.02	2	3	35.2%
Week 12	14 December	11.07	1	1	42.8%
Week 12 results	15 December	10.22	2	2	38.9%
Week 13	21 December	12.42	2	2	48.1%
Week 13 results	21 December	12.79	1	1	45.8%
Series average (excl. launch show)	2013	10.71	—N/a	—N/a	40.7%
