= Yui discography =

- Studio albums: 5
- Compilation albums: 3
- Singles: 23
- Video albums: 5
- Music videos: 28

The solo discography of Japanese musician Yui consists of five studio albums, three compilation albums, twenty-one singles and five video albums. These were released on independent label Leaflet Records in 2004, followed by Sony Music Entertainment Japan sub-label Gr8! Records in 2005, Sony Records between 2005 and 2006, Sony sub-label Studioseven Recordings between 2007 and 2010, before returning to Gr8! Records in 2010.

== Studio albums ==
List of albums, with selected chart positions
Title	Album details	Peak positions					Sales (JPN)	Certifications
Title	Album details	JPN	KOR (Note: The Gaon Albums Chart was established in 2010.) (Note: Week references for Gaon: "Gloria", "To Mother", Holidays in the Sun, "Rain", "It's My Life/Your Heaven", "Hello (Paradise Kiss)", "Green a.Live", "Fight", Green Garden Pop and Orange Garden Pop.)	KOR Overseas (Note: Week references for Gaon: "Gloria", "To Mother", Holidays in the Sun, "Rain", "It's My Life/Your Heaven", "Hello (Paradise Kiss)", "Green a.Live", How Crazy Your Love, "Fight", Green Garden Pop and Orange Garden Pop.)	TWN (Note: The G-Music chart was established in July 2005 and only archives the top 20 releases.)	TWN East Asian (Note: Position was taken from 2005 week 9 for From Me to You, 2007 week 47 for Thank You My Teens, 2008 week 14 for Can't Buy My Love, 2008 week 15 for I Loved Yesterday, 2008 week 28 for "Summer Song", 2008 week 46 for My Short Stories, 2009 week 23 for "Again", 2009 week 41 for "It's All Too Much", 2010 week 4 for "Gloria", 2010 week 23 for "To Mother", 2010 week 29 for Holidays in the Sun, 2010 week 48 for "Rain", 2011 week 5 for "It's My Life", 2011 week 12 for Hotel Holidays in the Sun, 2011 week 23 for "Hello", 2011 week 41 for "Green a.Live", 2011 week 45 for How Crazy Your Love, 2012 week 36 for "Fight", 2014 week 37 for Green Garden Pop and Orange Garden Pop.)	Sales (JPN)	Certifications
From Me to You	Released: February 22, 2006; Label: Studioseven; Formats: CD, digital download	4	—	—	—	12	293,000	RIAJ: Platinum (phy.)
Can't Buy My Love	Released: April 4, 2007; Label: Studioseven; Formats: CD, CD/DVD, digital download	1	—	—	—	8	694,000	RIAJ: 3× Platinum (phy.)
I Loved Yesterday	Released: April 9, 2008; Label: Studioseven; Formats: CD, CD/DVD, digital download	1	—	—	10	2	480,000	RIAJ: 2× Platinum (phy.)
Holidays in the Sun	Released: July 14, 2010; Label: Gr8!; Formats: CD, CD/DVD, digital download	1	7	2	13	2	313,000	RIAJ: Platinum (phy.)
How Crazy Your Love	Released: November 2, 2011; Label: Gr8!; Formats: CD, CD/DVD, digital download	1	—	68	—	6	209,000	RIAJ: Platinum (phy.)

== Mini-albums ==
List of mini-albums, with selected chart positions
Title	Album details	Peak positions
Title	Album details	JPN
Natural	Self-cover mini-album; Released: February 24, 2021; Label: Sony Music; Formats: CD, CD/Blu-ray, digital download	9

== Compilation albums ==
List of albums, with selected chart positions
Title	Album details	Peak positions				Sales (JPN)	Certifications
Title	Album details	JPN	KOR	KOR Overseas	TWN East Asian	Sales (JPN)	Certifications
My Short Stories	B-side compilation; Released: November 12, 2008; Label: Studioseven; Formats: CD, CD/DVD, digital download	1	—	—	2	270,000	RIAJ: Platinum (phy.)
Green Garden Pop	Released: December 5, 2012; Label: Gr8!; Formats: CD, CD/DVD, digital download	2	18	2	6	211,000	RIAJ: Platinum (phy.)
Orange Garden Pop	Released: December 5, 2012; Label: Gr8!; Formats: CD, CD/DVD, digital download	3	19	3	6	209,000	RIAJ: Platinum (phy.)

== Singles ==
List of singles, with selected chart positions
Title	Year	Peak chart positions					Sales (JPN)	Certifications	Album
Title	Year	JPN Oricon	JPN Hot 100 (Note: The Japan Hot 100 was established in February 2008.) (Note: Sources for chart positions are as follows: "I'll Be", "Good-bye Days", "Cherry", "Namidairo" "Laugh Away", "Summer Song", "Again", "It's All Too Much", "Gloria", "To Mother", "Please Stay with Me", "Rain", "It's My Life", "Hello", "Green a.Live", "Fight".)	KOR	KOR Overseas	TWN East Asian	Sales (JPN)	Certifications	Album
"It's Happy Line" (Note: Independently released.)	2004	—	—	—	—	—			Non-album single
"Feel My Soul"	2005	8	—	—	—	—	108,000	RIAJ: Gold (phy.)	From Me to You
"Tomorrow's Way"	2005	15	—	—	—	—	32,000		From Me to You
"Life"	2005	9	—	—	—	—	45,000	RIAJ: Gold (cell.)	From Me to You
"Tokyo"	2006	15	—	—	—	—	20,000		From Me to You
"Good-bye Days" (Note: As Yui for Kaoru Amane (YUI for 雨音薫, Yui fō Amane Kaoru).)	2006	8	97 (Note: Charted in 2012.)	—	—	—	242,000	RIAJ: Platinum (phy.); 2× Platinum (cell.); Gold (PC); Million (rt.)	Can't Buy My Love
"I Remember You"	2006	2	—	—	—	—	70,000	RIAJ: Gold (phy.)	Can't Buy My Love
"Rolling Star"	2007	4	—	—	—	—	169,000	RIAJ: Gold (phy.); 2× Platinum (dig.)	Can't Buy My Love
"Cherry"	2007	2	38 (Note: Charted in 2012.)	—	—	—	169,000	RIAJ: Gold (phy.); Million (dig.); 3× Platinum (rt.); Platinum (st.)	Can't Buy My Love
"My Generation"	2007	1	—	—	—	—	135,000	RIAJ: Gold (phy.); Platinum (dig.)	I Loved Yesterday
"Understand"	2007	1	—	—	—	—	135,000	RIAJ: Gold (phy.)	Non-album single
"Love & Truth"	2007	1	—	—	—	—	145,000	RIAJ: Gold (phy.); Platinum (cell.)	I Loved Yesterday
"Namidairo"	2008	3	3	—	—	—	115,000	RIAJ: Gold (phy.); Gold (cell.)	I Loved Yesterday
"Laugh Away"	2008	—	5	—	—	—		RIAJ: Platinum (cell.)	I Loved Yesterday
"Summer Song"	2008	1	1	—	—	14	116,000	RIAJ: Gold (phy.); Platinum (dig.); Platinum (st.)	Holidays in the Sun
"Again"	2009	1	1	—	—	2	164,000	RIAJ: Gold (phy.); 2× Platinum (dig.); Gold (st.)	Holidays in the Sun
"It's All Too Much"	2009	1	1	—	—	8	113,000	RIAJ: Gold (phy.); Gold (cell.)	Holidays in the Sun
"Never Say Die"	2009	1	—	—	—	8	113,000	RIAJ: Gold (phy.)	Non-album single
"Gloria"	2010	1	1	80	15	7	113,000	RIAJ: Gold (phy.); Platinum (cell.)	Holidays in the Sun
"To Mother"	2010	1	2	42	7	14	90,000	RIAJ: Gold (phy.); Gold (cell.)	Holidays in the Sun
"Rain"	2010	2	3	55	21	12	88,000	RIAJ: Gold (phy.)	How Crazy Your Love
"It's My Life"	2011	3	3	23	5	16	88,000	RIAJ: Gold (phy.)	How Crazy Your Love
"Your Heaven"	2011	3	— (Note: Charted at number 75 on the Adult Alternative Airplay chart.)	23	5	16	88,000	RIAJ: Gold (phy.)	Non-album single
"Hello (Paradise Kiss)"	2011	3	3	43	3	11	100,000	RIAJ: Gold (phy.); Platinum (dig.); Gold (st.)	How Crazy Your Love
"Green a.Live"	2011	1	2	100	12	13	71,000	RIAJ: Gold (phy.)	How Crazy Your Love
"Fight"	2012	5	7	85	12	8	56,000		Green Garden Pop
"——" denotes a title that did not chart or did not receive a certification in that territory.

=== Promotional singles ===
Title	Year	Peak chart positions	Certifications	Album
Title	Year	JPN Hot 100	Certifications	Album
"Oh Yeah (Yui Acoustic Version)"	2008	—		Non-album single
"I'll Be"	2008	19	RIAJ: Gold (cell.)	My Short Stories
"I'll Be (Yui Acoustic Version)"	2008	—		Non-album single
"Please Stay with Me"	2010	44	RIAJ: Platinum (dig.)	Holidays in the Sun

== Video albums ==
=== Live concerts ===
List of media, with selected chart positions
Title	Album details	Peak positions			Certifications
Title	Album details	JPN DVD	JPN Blu-ray	TWN	Certifications
Thank You My Teens	Released: November 14, 2007; Label: Studioseven; Formats: DVD, Blu-ray	4	38	11	RIAJ: Gold (phy.)
Hotel Holidays in the Sun	Released: March 9, 2011; Label: Studioseven; Formats: DVD, Blu-ray	2	40	6	
Cruising: How Crazy Your Love	Released: March 28, 2012; Label: Sony; Formats: DVD, Blu-ray	6	1	—	

=== Music video compilations ===
List of media, with selected chart positions
Title	Album details	Peak positions	
Title	Album details	JPN DVD	JPN Blu-ray
Find Me Yui Visual Best	Released: July 29, 2015; Label: Sony; Formats: DVD, Blu-ray	7	10

=== Documentaries ===
List of media, with selected chart positions
Title	Album details	Peak positions
Title	Album details	JPN DVD
Taiyō no Uta x Yui to Kaoru no Uta (タイヨウのうた×YUIと薫のうた; "Song of the Sun x Yui and Kaoru's Songs")	For the film Midnight Sun; Released: June 2, 2006; Label: Rentrak Japan; Formats: DVD	164
Closed Note Music Movie with Yui	For the film Closed Note; Released: September 5, 2007; Label: Sony; Formats: DVD	24

== Music videos ==
Year	Title	Director(s)
2004	"It's Happy Line"	Kazuyoshi Oku
2005	"Feel My Soul"	Takahiro Miki
2005	"Tomorrow's Way"	Takahiro Miki
2005	"Life"	Takahiro Miki
2006	"Tokyo"	Takahiro Miki
2006	"Good-bye Days"	Fuyu Arai
2006	"I Remember You"	Norihiro Koizumi
2007	"Rolling Star"	Takahiro Miki
2007	"Cherry"	Takahiro Miki
2007	"My Generation"	Norihiro Koizumi
2007	"Understand"	Kensuke Kawamura
2007	"Love & Truth" (Movie Ver.)	Takahiro Miki
2007	"Jam"	Shigeaki Kubo
2008	"Namidairo"	Takahiro Miki
2008	"Laugh Away"	Shigeaki Kubo
2008	"Summer Song"	Shigeaki Kubo
2008	"I'll Be"	Shigeaki Kubo
2009	"Again"	Shigeaki Kubo
2009	"It's All Too Much"	Shigeaki Kubo
2009	"Never Say Die"	Shigeaki Kubo
2010	"Gloria"	Shigeaki Kubo
2010	"To Mother"	Shigeaki Kubo
2010	"Please Stay with Me"	Tsuchiya Takatoshi
2010	"Rain"	Shigeaki Kubo
2011	"It's My Life"	Shigeaki Kubo
2011	"Hello (Paradise Kiss)"	Shigeaki Kubo
2011	"Green a.Live"	
2011	"Lock On"	
2012	"Fight"	
2012	"Fight (Acoustic Version)"	
2012	"Cherry (Bossa Live Version)"	
2012	"Life (2012 in Tokyo)"	
2012	"Tokyo (2012 in Fukuoka)"	
2012	"Good-bye Days (2012 Ver.)"	
2012	"Feel my Soul (2012 Ver.)"	

== Other appearances ==
List of non-studio album or guest appearances that feature Yui.
Title	Year	Album
"Again (TV Size)"	2009	Fullmetal Alchemist Original Soundtrack 1
"Cherry (Bossa Live Version)"	2012	She Loves You
"Hadaka no Pierrot"	2024	"Manazashi" ~Yomou to Ohana Tribute~
