= Holidays in the Sun (album) =

2010 studio album by Yui

Studio album by Yui
- Released: July 14, 2010
- Recorded: 2008–2010
- Studios: Burnish Stone Recording Studio (Tokyo); Studio Fine (Tokyo); Heart Beat Recording Studio (Tokyo); Sony Music Studios (Tokyo); Honey Bee Studio
- Genres: Pop; pop rock
- Length: 47:37
- Label: gr8! Records
- Producer: Hisashi Kondō

Yui chronology
My Short Stories (2008)	Holidays in the Sun (2010)	How Crazy Your Love (2011)

Alternative cover
- CD+DVD edition

Singles from Holidays in the Sun
- 1. "Summer Song" Released: July 2, 2008; 2. "Again" Released: June 3, 2009; 3. "It's All Too Much" Released: October 7, 2009; 4. "Gloria" Released: January 20, 2010; 5. "To Mother" Released: June 2, 2010

Holidays in the Sun is the fourth studio album by Japanese singer-songwriter Yui. It was released on July 14, 2010, by gr8! Records. This was her first album release in about one year and eight months since My Short Stories (2008), and her first original album release in two years and three months since I Loved Yesterday (2008). The title of the album comes from the song of the same name by the English band Sex Pistols. Beginning in early 2008, the album's production was handled by longtime collaborator Hisashi Kondō. Yui served as the sole lyricist and composer on Holidays in the Sun, as she had on all of her preceding albums. Holidays in the Sun is primarily a J-pop album with numerous elements of pop rock, folk pop, bossa nova, gospel music, and pop ballads.

Upon its release, Holidays in the Sun was met with generally positive reviews from music critics, many of whom complimented the singles, composition, and labelled it as Yui's strongest album to date. However, some questioned the memorability of some of the songs. Commercially, Holidays in the Sun was a success, becoming her third studio album to reach the top spot on Japan's Oricon Albums Chart. It was certified platinum by the Recording Industry Association of Japan (RIAJ) for shipments of over 250,000 units.

Five singles were released from Holidays in the Sun between 2008 to 2010, with all of them going to number one on the weekly Oricon Singles Chart. In addition, "Never Say Die," which was included in the double A-side single "It's All Too Much/Never Say Die," is not included in this album. Yui promoted the album on her Hotel Holidays in the Sun tour, which ran from September to November 2010 in major cities across the Japanese archipelago.

== Background and development ==
In early June 2010, Japanese recording artist Yui announced that she would release her first original album in about two years and three months. The album would include all five of her number one singles, making this the first time in history that a female singer-songwriter has released an album that includes five consecutive number one Oricon singles (according to Sony Music Japan). Holidays in the Sun marks her first album release in about a year and eight months since her 2008 compilation album My Short Stories, and her first original album release in two years and three months since her 2008 album I Loved Yesterday. The title of the album is derived from the song of the same name by the English band Sex Pistols.

Yui and gr8! Records enlisted a long-term collaborator, Japanese musician and producer Hisashi Kondō, to produce Holidays in the Sun; this marked Yuii's fourth consecutive studio album to be fully produced by Kondō. Akin to all of her preceding album's, Yui served as the album's sole lyricist. In an interview with the magazine ORISUTA, she described Holidays in the Sun as a bright, sparkling, and fun album that was made it with the image of someone who would want to listen to it while driving in the summer.

== Composition ==
"That's right. During my break, I was able to go back to my roots and reaffirm that I really love music. I also realized that I may have been too tied down by the framework I had set for myself. I wanted to enjoy music more freely, without straining my shoulders.”

— Yui discussing her changed approach to music on Holidays in the Sun.

Musically, Holidays in the Sun is predominately inspired by pop rock and folk pop like is predecessors, but also adds in new influences such as bossa nova and gospel music. Prior to its release, Yui said the album's sound became more diverse than the music released before her break, saying that she was able to go back to her roots. Furthermore, she stated that her range of emotions has broadened to include being happy and having fun, and she became able to concretely express the ideas that popped into her head. In an interview, Yui said, “I want to make a summer album!"

Holidays in the Sun opens with the track "To Mother", a pop ballad that conveys the feelings for a "precious person" in one's heart. Although it is Yui's first song in which she exchanges her guitar for a piano, it was first written using a guitar. The second song "Again" is a rock tune that expresses her desire to "try again" and "is the perfect song for a new challenge." "Parade" is the third track on the album, and it is a light acoustic bossa nova-like song that was recorded with a live accordion. "es.car," the fourth song on the album, is a rock song with lyrics that gives the feeling of the beginning of love. The fifth track on the album is "Shake My Heart," a large-scale number with a rich sound from the horn section in the chorus. The albums sixth track "Gloria" is a rock song centered around an acoustic guitar that conveys the cries of the youthful heart.

"I do it" is the seventh track on Holidays in the Sun, and is a self-cover of a song Yui provided to Stereopony. "Please Stay With Me," the albums eighth track, is a straightforward love song; the prototype for this song was written more than two years prior to its official release date. "Summer Song," the album's ninth track, is a light-hearted number with an acoustic sound. "Cinnamon," the tenth song that appears on the album, is a rock song about not being able to contact a lover through cellphone. "Driving Happy Life," the album's eleventh track, is a lively song about driving in a rented car during the summertime. "It's All Too Much" is the twelfth track on the album; it is a rock number that describes her worries about life's many hardships and her strength to survive. The album closes with the song "Kiss Me," which is a upbeat love song.

== Release and formats ==
"Since I'm releasing it in the summer, I wanted to make an album that suited the season. It's bright, sparkling, and a really fun album, and I made it with the image of someone who would want to listen to it while driving in the summer."

— Yui talking about the developmental process for Holidays in the Sun.

Holidays in the Sun was released on July 14, 2010, as her fourth musical effort. The album features 13 tracks totaling more than 47 minutes in length. It was released in two formats: a regular CD only edition and a limited edition with a DVD. The DVD includes the music videos of the singles from the previous album, "It's Happy Line," a song from her indie days, the digital-only single "Laugh Away," and the pre-release single "To Mother." Of these, "To Mother" is included as a “multi-angle clip” that can be selected from multiple angles in conjunction with the remote control's four-way controller.

The album artwork and photoshoot was photographed by Yoji Kawada, while the art direction and the album's booklet was designed by Yoshihiro Inoue and Yukinko. The standalone CD artwork is a close up of Yui's face, while the CD and music video DVD format has Yui learning against a settee.

== Promotion ==
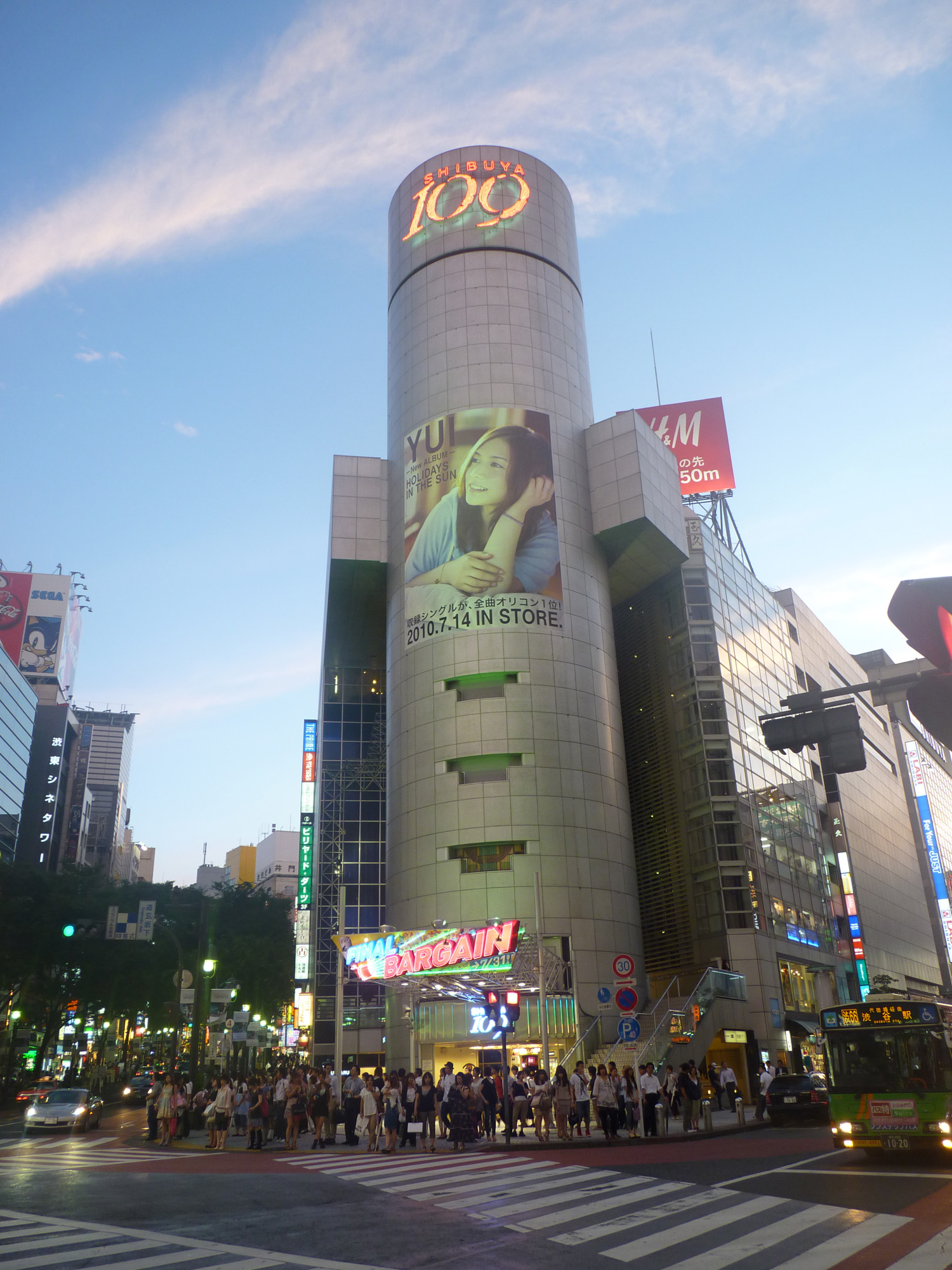
Holidays in the Sun being promoted on Shibuya 109.

=== Singles and other songs ===
Five singles were released to promote Holidays in the Sun. "Summer song" was released as the album's lead single on July 2, 2008. The song performed well in Yui's native Japan, reaching number one on the Oricon Singles Chart. "Summer Song" was certified gold by the Recording Industry Association of Japan (RIAJ) for physical sales of 100,000 units and platinum for digital sales of 250,000 units. "Summer Song" also topped the Japan Hot 100. The album's second single, "Again," was released on June 9, 2009. The single was commercially successful, becoming a number one single on both the Oricon Singles Chart and Japan Hot 100; it was certified gold for physical sales and platinum for digital sales by the RIAJ. "It's All Too Much" and "Never Say Die" were both distributed as a double A-side single on October 7, 2009; it peaked at the top spot on the Oricon Singles Chart. The single was certified gold for physical sales, while "It's All Too Much" was certified gold separately for digital sales and topped the Japan Hot 100.

"Gloria" was released as the albums fourth single on January 20, 2010. It peaked at number one on the Oricon Singles Chart and the Japan Hot 100. "Gloria" was certified gold for physical sales and platinum for digital sales. "To Mother" was released as the albums fifth and final single on June 2, 2010. It became her seventh number-one single, and was certified gold twice by the RIAJ for physical and digital sales. "To Mother" only managed to peak at number two on the Japan Hot 100, breaking her number-one streak on that chart. The promotional single "Please Stay With Me" peaked at number 44 on the Japan Hot 100 and was certified platinum by the RIAJ for selling over 250,000 downloads.

Several songs included on the album were included in various commercials and advertisements promoted in Japan. "Again" was used as the theme song for the anime television series Fullmetal Alchemist: Brotherhood. "It's All Too Much" and "Never Say Die" were used both for the first live-action film adaptation of the manga series Kaiji, as theme song and insert song, respectively. "Gloria" was used as the commercial song for Benesse Corporation's "Shinkenzemi High School Course" and as the commercial song for Assign Inc.'s "Yoake." "Please Stay With Me" served as the insert song for Fuji TV's Summer Romance Shines in Rainbow Colors.

=== Touring ===
Yui announced her Hotel Holidays in the Sun tour on June 15, 2010. A total of 15 shows in 12 venues were scheduled in Japan, spanning from September 12 at the Ichihara Civic Hall, Chiba Prefecture, and finishing on November 2 at Nippon Budokan. The DVD recording of the last stage of Yui 's live tour held at Nippon Budokan was released on March 9, 2011; it reached the runner-up spot on the Oricon DVD chart. On June 26, 2011, she performed a similar concert titled "Hong Kong HOTEL HOLIDAYS IN THE SUN" at the AsiaWorld-Arena in Hong Kong.

== Reception ==
Professional ratings
Review scores
Source	Rating
AllMusic	3.5/5 stars
Rockin' On Japan	(positive)

Holidays in the Sun received positive reviews from music critics. Alexey Eremenko from AllMusic awarded the album three-and-a-half stars out of five. He commented: "After three nice but predictable albums with zero degrees of variation, Yui finally felt that it was time to diversify her airy guitar pop. The opening cut on Holidays in the Sun inspires a fear that she's got it all wrong, because it's a sugary but bland piano-led ballad of the sort that the J-pop scene produces too much of, but in the end, things work out well, with 'To Mother' being the sole blunder on an otherwise engaging, if not groundbreaking, record." Despite that, he questioned the memorability of some of the album's material. Eremenko concluded: "As prime guitar pop goes, Yui remains a featherweight -- the songs on Holidays in the Sun are catchy, but not the sort of pop you'll remember years down the line, even after hearing them more than once -- but within the J-pop framework, she is an artist to watch out for."

Inoue Tomoaki from Rockin' On Japan was positive towards the album. Tomoaki commented that there is an overwhelming strength in the album's songs and that Yui had truly become stronger. At the end of the review he commented: "During her break, which was a preparation period for this work, she must have clearly recognized once again that in order to fight, a calm daily life is necessary, and in order to live a happy daily life, one must fight boldly. There is an overwhelming strength that has taken root in the way that soft songs and powerful songs stand side by side while seeking each other."

Commercially, Holidays in the Sun was a success. In Japan, Holidays in the Sun debuted at the top of the daily and weekly Oricon Albums Chart, opening with sales of 184,952 copies in its first week. 67,000 copies of the album were sold on the first day. It became Yui's third studio album to top the charts on Oricon. Holidays in the Sun spent three weeks inside the top ten on the weekly chart, and lasted 32 weeks in total. By the end of 2010, the album was the 22nd best-selling record of the year in Japan, having sold 307,564 copies. This ranked it as the eighth best-selling album by a female artist in 2010, just behind entries from Japanese singers Kana Nishino, Namie Amuro, Kaela Kimura, Kumi Koda, Ayumi Hamasaki, and Hikaru Utada, and American singer Lady Gaga. Moreover, the album opened at number one on the Billboard Japan Top Album Sales chart. Holidays in the Sun was certified platinum by the Recording Industry Association of Japan (RIAJ) for shipments of 250,000 units.

== Track listing ==
Regular Edition

All tracks are written by Yui, except where otherwise noted.

CD
No.	Title	Lyrics	Arranger(s)	Length
1.	"To Mother"		Hisashi Kondo	3:48
2.	"Again"		Hisashi Kondo	4:14
3.	"Parade"		Northa+	2:52
4.	"es.car"		e.u.Band & Hisashi Kondo	3:19
5.	"Shake My Heart"		Tsuyoshi Kinoe	3:37
6.	"Gloria"		Hisashi Kondo	3:38
7.	"I do it"	Haraguni Aimi	Northa+	3:47
8.	"Please Stay With Me"		Hisashi Kondo	3:56
9.	"Summer Song"		Northa+	3:26
10.	"Cinnamon"		Northa+	2:56
11.	"Driving Happy Life"		Northa+	3:43
12.	"It's all too much"		Hisashi Kondo	4:14
13.	"Kiss Me"		Northa+	4:07

Limited Edition

Regular Edition + DVD

DVD
No.	Title	Length
1.	"It's Happy Line" (Music video)
2.	"My Generation" (Music video)
3.	"Love & Truth" (Music video)
4.	"Namidairo" (Music video)
5.	"Laugh Away" (Music video)
6.	"To Mother" (Multi-angle clip)

== Charts ==
=== Weekly charts ===
Chart (2010)	Peak position
Japanese Albums (Oricon)	1
Japanese Top Albums (Billboard)	1

=== Monthly charts ===
Chart (2010)	Peak position
Japanese Albums (Oricon)	2

=== Year-end charts ===
Chart (2010)	Position
Japanese Albums (Oricon)	22

== Sales and certifications ==
Region	Certification	Certified units/sales
Japan (RIAJ)	Platinum	313,316
