= Hotel Holidays in the Sun =

Yui 4th Tour 2010: Hotel Holidays in the Sun

Video by Yui
- Released: March 9, 2011
- Genre: J-pop
- Label: Sony Music Entertainment

"Hotel Holidays in the Sun" is the second live DVD released by Yui. It was released on March 9, 2011 and contains footage of the final performance in her "Holidays in the Sun" tour. First press edition of the DVD comes with a special sleeve case design and a photobook.

== Track listing ==
1. Again
2. Rolling Star
3. It's All Too Much
4. Laugh Away
5. Parade
6. Cinnamon
7. Please Stay With Me
8. How Crazy
9. Love is All
10. Tokyo
11. I'll be
12. Never Say Die
13. Es.car
14. I Do It
15. Tonight
16. Shake My Heart

Encore songs

17. To Mother
18. Driving Happy Life
19. Rain
20. Che.r.ry
21. Gloria
22. Good-bye Days

== Sales chart (Japan) ==
Chart (2011)	Peak position
Japan Oricon DVD Chart	2
