= MTV Video Music Award Japan for Best Video from a Film =

Annual Japanese music award

Best Video from a Film (最優秀映画ビデオ賞)

== Results ==
The following table displays the nominees and the winners in bold print with a yellow background.

=== 2000s ===
Year	Artist	Video	Film
**2002** (1st)	**Christina Aguilera, Lil' Kim, Mýa and Pink**	**"Lady Marmalade"**	**Moulin Rouge!**
**2002** (1st)	Destiny's Child	"Independent Women Part 1"	Charlie's Angels
**2002** (1st)	Dreams Come True	"Crystal Vine"	Atlantis: The Lost Empire
**2002** (1st)	L'Arc-en-Ciel	"Spirit Dreams Inside (Another Dream)"	Final Fantasy: The Spirits Within
**2002** (1st)	Zeebra featuring Aktion	"Neva Enuff"	Brother
**2003** (2nd)	**Eminem**	**"Lose Yourself"**	**8 Mile**
**2003** (2nd)	Beyoncé	"Work It Out"	Austin Powers in Goldmember
**2003** (2nd)	King Giddra	"Generation Next"	Madness in Bloom (凶気の桜)
**2003** (2nd)	Supercar	"Yumegiwa Last Boy" (ユメギワ・ラスト・ボーイ)	Ping Pong (ピンポン)
**2003** (2nd)	Madonna	"Die Another Day"	007 Die Another Day
**2004** (3rd)	**Pink featuring William Orbit**	**"Feel Good Time"**	**Charlie's Angels: Full Throttle**
**2004** (3rd)	Evanescence	"Bring Me to Life"	Daredevil
**2004** (3rd)	Korn	"Did My Time"	Lara Croft Tomb Raider: The Cradle of Life
**2004** (3rd)	Nelly, P. Diddy and Murphy Lee	"Shake Ya Tailfeather"	Bad Boys 2
**2004** (3rd)	Quruli	"Highway" (ハイウェイ)	Josee, the Tiger and the Fish (ジョゼと虎と魚たち)
**2005** (4th)	**Ken Hirai**	**"Hitomi wo Tojite" (瞳をとじて)**	**Socrates in Love (世界の中心で、愛をさけぶ)**
**2005** (4th)	Christina Aguilera featuring Missy Elliott	"Car Wash"	Shark Tale
**2005** (4th)	Ray Charles	"What'd I Say"	Ray
**2005** (4th)	Ana Johnsson	"We Are"	Spider-Man 2
**2005** (4th)	Orange Range	"Hana" (花)	Be with You (いま、会いにゆきます)
**2006** (5th)	**Nana starring Mika Nakashima**	**"Glamorous Sky"**	**Nana (ナナ)**
**2006** (5th)	Amerie	"1 Thing"	Hitch
**2006** (5th)	Toshinobu Kubota	"Kimino No Soba Ni" (君のそばに)	Under The Same Moon (同じ月を見ている)
**2006** (5th)	Tamio Okuda	"Toritsu Baa" (トリッパー)	Custom Made 10.30 (カスタムメイド10.30)
**2006** (5th)	Reira starring Yuna Ito	"Endless Story"	Nana (ナナ)
**2007** (6th)	**Ai Otsuka**	**"Ren'ai Shashin" (恋愛写真)**	**Tada, Kimi wo Aishiteru (ただ、君を愛してる)**
**2007** (6th)	50 Cent	"Window Shopper"	Get Rich or Die Tryin'
**2007** (6th)	Beyoncé	"Listen"	Dreamgirls
**2007** (6th)	Bonnie Pink	"Love is Bubble"	Memories of Matsuko (嫌われ松子の一生)
**2007** (6th)	Yui	"Good-bye Days"	Midnight Sun (タイヨウのうた)
**2008** (7th)	**Hikaru Utada**	**"Beautiful World"**	**Evangelion: 1.0 You Are (Not) Alone (ヱヴァンゲリオン新劇場版：序)**
**2008** (7th)	Ketsumeishi	"Deai no Kakera" (出会いのかけら)	Kage Hinata ni Saku (陰日向に咲く)
**2008** (7th)	Linkin Park	"What I've Done"	Transformers
**2008** (7th)	Snow Patrol	"Signal Fire"	Spider-Man 3
**2008** (7th)	Yui	"Love & Truth"	Closed Note (クローズド・ノート)
**2009** (8th)	**Remioromen**	**"Yume no Tsubomi" (夢の蕾)**	**Kansen Retto (感染列島)**
**2009** (8th)	AI	"Okuribito" (おくりびと)	Departures (おくりびと)
**2009** (8th)	Madonna featuring Justin Timberlake and Timbaland	"4 Minutes"	Get Smart
**2009** (8th)	Monobright	"Ano Toumeikan to Shonen" ("あの透明感と少年)	After School (アフタースクール)
**2009** (8th)	Jack White and Alicia Keys	"Another Way to Die"	Quantum of Solace

=== 2010s ===
Year	Artist	Video	Film
**2010** (9th)	**Juju with Jay'ed**	**"Ashita ga Kuru Nara" (明日がくるなら)**	**April Bride (余命一ヶ月の花嫁)**
**2010** (9th)	Flumpool	"Dear Mr. & Ms. Picaresque" (MW ～Dear Mr. & Ms. ピカレスク～)	MW
**2010** (9th)	Leona Lewis	"I See You"	Avatar
**2010** (9th)	Paramore	"Decode"	Twilight
**2010** (9th)	Shōnan no Kaze	"Tomo Yo" (親友よ)	Drop (ドロップ)
**2011** (10th)	**Avril Lavigne**	**"Alice"**	**Alice in Wonderland**
**2011** (10th)	Asian Kung–Fu Generation	"Solanin" (ソラニン)	Solanin (ソラニン)
**2011** (10th)	Daft Punk	"Derezzed"	Tron: Legacy
**2011** (10th)	Flumpool	"Kimi ni Todoke" (君に届け)	Kimi ni Todoke (君に届け)
**2011** (10th)	Justin Bieber featuring Jaden Smith	"Never Say Never"	Never Say Never
**2012** (11th)	**Bump of Chicken**	**"Good Luck" (グッドラック)**	**Always Sanchōme no Yūhi '64 (ALWAYS 三丁目の夕日'64)**
**2012** (11th)	Bruno Mars	"It Will Rain"	The Twilight Saga: Breaking Dawn – Part1
**2012** (11th)	Foo Fighters	"Walk"	The Mighty Thor
**2012** (11th)	Ziyoou-Vachi	"Disco" (デスコ)	Moteki (モテキ)
**2012** (11th)	Superfly	"Ai wo Kurae" (愛をくらえ)	Smuggler (スマグラー おまえの未来を運べ)
**2013** (12th)	Adele	"Skyfall"	Skyfall
**2013** (12th)	Florence and the Machine	"Breath of Life"	Snow White and the Huntsman
**2013** (12th)	Mr. Children	"Inori ~Namida no Kidou" (祈り ～涙の軌道)	Bokura ga Ita (僕等がいた 前篇)
**2013** (12th)	**One Ok Rock**	**"The Beginning"**	**Rurouni Kenshin (るろうに剣心)**
**2013** (12th)	Pitbull	"Back in Time"	Men in Black 3

== See also ==
- MTV Video Music Award for Best Video from a Film
