= Anri Okamoto =

Japanese fashion model and actress

- Born: July 1, 1994 (age 32); Tokyo, Japan
- Years active: 2004–present
- Agent: Stardust Promotion

Anri Okamoto (岡本杏理, Okamoto Anri) (born July 1, 1994) is a Japanese fashion model and actress.

== Filmography ==
=== Dramas ===
- Garo (2005)
- 1 Litre of Tears (2005)
- Koisuru Nichiyobi 3rd Series (2007; episode 25 "Sanshimai") - starring
- Sexy Voice and Robo (2007)
- Tokyo Shojo (2008) - starring
- Shōkōjo Seira (2009) - starring
- LADY ~Saigo no Hanzai Profile~ (2011)
- Nazotoki wa Dinner no Ato de (2011)
- Mannequin Girls (2011)
- Juhō2405 Watashi ga Shinu Wake (2012)
- Switch Girl!! 2 (2012)
- Vampire Heaven (2013)
- Sennyū Tantei Tokage (2013)
- Seventeen Killer (2013)
- Akka (2014)
- Ouroboros~Kono Ai Koso Seigi (2015)

=== Movies ===
- Smile: Seiya no Kiseki (2007)
- Sunadokei (2008)
- Yatterman (2009)
- Intern! (2016), Maki

=== PV ===
- Yui "Laugh Away" (2008)
- Yui "Laugh away ~ YUI Acoustic version ~" (2008)
- Yui "Summer Song" (2008)
- Yui "Gloria" (2010)
