= My Short Stories =

Album by Yui

Compilation album by Yui
- Released: November 12, 2008
- Recorded: 2008
- Genre: Pop, pop rock
- Label: Sony Music Japan, Studioseven Recordings

Yui chronology
I Loved Yesterday (2008)	My Short Stories (2008)	Holidays in the Sun (2010)

My Short Stories is the first B-side compilation album by the popular Japanese singer-songwriter Yui that was released on November 12, 2008. This album contains all the past B sides of her past singles and a new song titled "I'll be".

The album is certified platinum by RIAJ for shipment of 250,000 copies in Japan.

My Short Stories will be reissue in Blu-Spec CD format with limited press on September 2, 2009.

The album title, My Short Stories' message is "Zutto kono Arubamu wo tsukuritakute, sono monogatari wa, YUI kara hajimatta" (ずっと このアルバムを 作りたくて、その物語は YUIから 始まった) which means in English "I have always wanted to make this album. This short story is all started from YUI."

== Track listing ==
Normal Edition

All lyrics are written by Yui; all music is composed by Yui

CD
No.	Title	Arranger(s)	Length
1.	"I'll be"	Northa+	3:32
2.	"Help"	Yui	3:30
3.	"Last Train"	Hideyuki "Daichi"Suzuki	4:41
4.	"Winter Hot Music"	Northa+	3:06
5.	"Jam"	Shigezo	3:05
6.	"Skyline"	Akihisa Matsuura	3:49
7.	"Free Bird"	Suzuki	2:55
8.	"I Wanna Be..."	Northa+	3:25
9.	"Oh My God"	Northa+	2:45
10.	"Cloudy"	Northa+	3:26
11.	"Driving Today"	Northa+	3:08
12.	"Understand"	Northa+	3:33
13.	"Crossroad"	Suzuki	3:54
14.	"It's Happy Line"	Suzuki	3:19
15.	"Why Me"	Suzuki	4:05

Limited Edition

Normal Edition + DVD

DVD
No.	Title	Length
1.	"I'll Be" (Music video)
2.	"Understand" (Music video)
3.	"Jam" (Music video)

Yui 3rd Tour "oui" ~I Loved Yesterday~ Premium Edition
No.	Title	Length
4.	"Opening"
5.	"No Way"
6.	"Day Dreamer"
7.	"Street live at Sapporo"
8.	"Namidairo"
9.	"Am I Wrong?"
10.	"Street live at Sendai"
11.	"Love Is All"
12.	"Tomorrow's Way"
13.	"Street live at Hiroshima"
14.	"Good-bye Days"
15.	"Ending"

=== "I'll Be" ===
"I'll Be" was chosen for the commercial song of Sony Walkman NW-S638FK Series and its promotion campaign named, "Play You". Yui did a school live in Omiya Koryo High School in Saitama Prefecture, Japan with the orchestra of the school for this campaign. The footage of this event was released in her next single, Again Limited Edition. Later, "I'll be" was again released as an orchestra mix version. Yui filmed another commercial for Sony Walkman with this live event. This school live was aired on NTV program Dare Mo Shiranai Nakeru Uta (誰も知らない泣ける歌 Unknown songs that can make you cry) on 18 February 2009. The message for this campaign is "Itsudatte tonari de utau yo. Ongaku ga areba hitotsu ni nareru ne" (いつだって となりで 歌うよ。 音楽が あれば 一つに 慣れる ね。) which mean in English "I will always sing next to you. If there is music, we can all become one."

== Sales charts (Japan) ==
=== Oricon sales charts ===
Release	Chart	Peak position	First week sales	Sales total
November 12, 2008	Oricon Daily Chart	1		
November 12, 2008	Oricon Weekly Chart	1	173,741	269,366
November 12, 2008	Oricon Monthly Chart	3		
November 12, 2008	Oricon Yearly Chart	43		
