= Flower Flower =

Japanese rock band

- Origin: Tokyo, Japan
- Genres: Indie pop; shoegazing
- Years active: 2013–present
- Labels: Sony Music Records
- Members: Yui, Mura☆Jun, Mafumafu, Sacchan
- Website: www.flowerflower-net.jp

Flower Flower (フラワー フラワー, Furawā Furawā; stylised as FLOWER FLOWER) is a Japanese rock band that was formed in 2013 by Japanese singer-songwriter Yui. The group debuted with the single "Tsuki" (2013).

== Biography ==
Vocalist Yui is a musician from Fukuoka, who originally debuted as a soloist under Sony Music Entertainment Japan in 2005, after auditioning in 2004. She released five studio albums between 2006 and 2011, all of which were commercially successful. Some of her most famous songs include "Good-bye Days" (2006), the theme song for the film Midnight Sun which starred her as Xeroderma Pigmentosum sufferer Kaoru Amane, and the spring song "Cherry" (2007), both of which were certified million by the RIAJ. In November 2012, Yui announced her intention to retire from music as a soloist.

Flower Flower was first formed in early 2013, composed of musicians Yui respected. These included keyboardist Mura☆Jun, otherwise known as Jun Murayama, a member of the band Venomstrip and a session musician, as well as Mafumafu, i.e. bassist Katsuhiro Mafune, and drummer Norihide Saji, known in the band as Sacchan.

The band started with recording sessions, followed by a series of secret lives across Japan in March 2013. The project was officially announced in April 2013, followed by a series of festival performances. The group released their first single "Tsuki" digitally in June, used in a commercial campaign for cellphone provider au. The group attended festivals such as Join Alive, Rock in Japan Festival and Countdown Japan.

In May 2014, the band released their second song, "Kamisama". In June, it was announced that Flower Flower would perform the four theme songs for the live-action adaptation of Daisuke Igarashi's manga Little Forest, released in two parts in August 2014 and February 2015. Flower Flower performed the theme songs for each season, with summer and autumn released in 2014 and winter and spring in 2015.

The name Flower Flower was picked as Yui wanted something natural in their band name.

== Discography ==
=== Studio album ===
List of albums, with selected chart positions
Title	Album details	Peak positions		Sales (JPN) (Note: Sales provided by Oricon database and are rounded to the nearest thousand copies.)
Title	Album details	JPN	KOR Overseas	Sales (JPN)
Mi (実; "Fruit")	Released: November 26, 2014 (JPN); Label: Sony Music Records; Formats: CD, CD/DVD, digital download	5	24	JPN: 34,790 (as first week sales)
Spotlight (スポットライト)	Released: March 14, 2018 (JPN); Label: Sony Music Records; Formats: CD, CD/DVD, digital download	9	16	JPN: 7,083 (as first week sales)
Target (ターゲット)	Released: March 25, 2020 (JPN); Label: Sony Music Records; Formats: CD, CD/Blu-Ray, digital download	21	—	JPN: 4,923 (as first week sales)

=== Extended play ===
List of extended plays, with selected chart positions
Title	Album details	Peak positions	Sales (JPN)
Title	Album details	JPN	Sales (JPN)
Shiki (色; "Colors")	Released: February 18, 2015 (JPN); Label: Sony Music Records; Formats: CD, CD/DVD, digital download	10	12,035

=== Singles ===
List of singles, with selected chart positions
Title	Year	Peak chart positions		Album
Title	Year	JPN Oricon	JPN Hot 100 (Note: Sources for chart positions are as follows: "Tsuki", "Kamisama", "Subarashii Sekai".)	Album
"Tsuki" (月; "Moon")	2013	—	37	Mi
"Kamisama" (神様; "God")	2014	—	70	Mi
"Natsu" (夏; "Summer")	2014	—	—	Shiki
"Aki" (秋; "Autumn")	2014	—	—	Shiki
"Subarashii Sekai" (素晴らしい世界; "Wonderful World")	2014	—	81	Mi
"Takaramono" (宝物; "Treasure")	2016	10	31	Takaramono
"Mannequin" (マネキン; "Mannequin")	2017	20	—	Mannequin
"Tokei" (時計; "Clock")	2018	—	—	Spotlight
"Tsuki -band acoustic ver.-"	2019	—	—	Non-album singles
"Kamisama -band acoustic ver.-"	2019	—	—	Non-album singles
"Tomoshibi" (灯火; "Light")	2019	—	—	Non-album singles
"Atsui Aitsu " (熱いアイツ; "Hot Guy") featuring Mizobe Ryo (odol)	2020	—	—	Target
"Hana Uta" (はなうた; "Flower Song")	2020			Hana Uta

=== Video albums ===
List of media, with selected chart positions
Title	Album details	Peak positions	
Title	Album details	JPN DVD	JPN Blu-ray
Inko no have a nice day Tour 2018.05.09 Zepp Tokyo (インコの have a nice dayツアー 2018.05.09 Zepp Tokyo, Inko no have a nice day tsuā ー 2018.05.09 Zepp Tokyo)	Released: June 27, 2018 (JPN); Label: Sony Music Records; Formats: DVD, Blu-ray	13	24

=== Music videos ===
List of music videos, with director(s)
Title	Year	Director(s)
"Kamisama"	2014	Masato Matsukawa
"Natsu"	2014	Junichi Mori
"Aki"	2014	Junichi Mori
"Haru"	2015	Junichi Mori
"Fuyu"	2015	Junichi Mori
"Takaramono"	2016	Saki Iyori
"Mannequin"	2017	Takuro Okubo
"Tokei (Special Video)"	2018	Masato Matsukawa
"Inochi"	2018	
"Powerful"	2018	
"Mitsu (Lyric Video)"	2019	
"Yume"	2020	
"Jouka"	2020	
"Hana Uta"	2020	
