= To Mother =

To Mother may refer to:

- To Mother (EP), a 1991 EP by Babes in Toyland
- To Mother (g.o.d song), 1999
- To Mother (Yui song), 2010
