= I Loved Yesterday =

Studio album by Yui
- Released: 9 April 2008
- Recorded: 2007–2008
- Genre: Pop, pop rock
- Length: 46:21
- Label: Sony Music Japan, Studioseven Recordings

Yui chronology
Can't Buy My Love (2007)	I Loved Yesterday (2008)	My Short Stories (2008)

Singles from I Loved Yesterday
- 1. "My Generation" Released: June 13, 2007; 2. "Love & Truth" Released: September 29, 2007; 3. "Namidairo" Released: February 27, 2008

Professional ratings
Review scores
Source	Rating
Allmusic	3/5 stars

I Loved Yesterday is the third album of Japanese singer-songwriter YUI, and was released on 9 April 2008. The album peaked at number twenty-three on the Billboard Japan Top 100. I Loved Yesterday has been certified double platinum by RIAJ for shipment of 500,000 copies in Japan.

The 1st track, "Laugh Away" which is the lead song for the album is released as a 1st digital single on March 10, 2008, which is used as the theme song for the Glico "Watering KissMint" commercial and the 10th track, "Oh Yeah: YUI Acoustic Version" is, later, also released as another digital single on May 25, 2008, which is used as the opening theme song to the morning Japanese show Mezamashi TV.

The album title, I Loved Yesterday's message is "Kinou wo aiseru youni kyou wo ikiyou. Ashita mo onaji kimochi de itai kara" (昨日を 愛せるように 今日を 生きよう 明日も 同じ気持ちで いたいから) which means in English, "In order to love yesterday, let's live today without regrets. I want to live tomorrow with the same feeling as well".

== Track listing ==
Regular Edition

All lyrics are written by Yui; all music is composed by Yui, except noted

CD
No.	Title	Music	Arranger(s)	Length
1.	"Laugh away"		northa+	4:19
2.	"My Generation"		northa+	3:53
3.	"Find me"		northa+	3:35
4.	"No way"	COZZi	COZZi	1:16
5.	"Namidairo"		northa+	3:33
6.	"Daydreamer"	COZZi	COZZi	3:35
7.	"Love is all"		northa+	4:24
8.	"I will love you"	COZZi	COZZi	4:21
9.	"We will go"		northa+	3:02
10.	"OH YEAH"		northa+	3:12
11.	"My friend"		SHIGEZO	3:13
12.	"LOVE & TRUTH"		northa+	4:18
13.	"Am I wrong?"		northa+	3:35

Limited Edition

Regular Edition + DVD

DVD
No.	Title	Length
1.	"Good-bye Days" (Music video)
2.	"I Remember You" (Music video)
3.	"Rolling Star" (Music video)
4.	"Cherry" (Music video)
5.	"Live at Budokan Premium Edition" (2007.11.19 live footage)

== Charts and sales ==
=== Oricon sales charts (Japan) ===
Release	Oricon Chart	Peak position	First week sales	Sales total
April 9, 2008	Daily Chart	1		475,709
April 9, 2008	Weekly Chart	1	285,407	475,709
April 9, 2008	Monthly Chart	3		475,709
April 9, 2008	Yearly Chart	19		475,709
