= Can't Buy My Love =

Studio album by Yui
- Released: 4 April 2007
- Recorded: 2006–2007
- Genre: Pop, pop rock
- Length: 45:28
- Label: Sony Music Records, Studioseven Recordings
- Producer: Hisashi Kondo

Yui chronology
From Me to You (2006)	Can't Buy My Love (2007)	I Loved Yesterday (2008)

Singles from Can't Buy My Love
- 1. "Good-bye Days" Released: 14 June 2006; 2. "I Remember You" Released: 20 September 2006; 3. "Rolling Star" Released: 17 January 2007; 4. "Cherry" Released: 7 March 2007

Professional ratings
Review scores
Source	Rating
Allmusic	3.5/5 stars

Can't Buy My Love is the second album of Japanese singer and songwriter Yui, released on 4 April 2007 by Sony Music Records. The album title, Can't Buy My Love's message is "Ai suru mono wa kantan ni wa yuzurenai" (愛する ものは 簡単には 譲れない) which means in English "I can't easily hand over things that I adore."

This album reached #1 rank weekly, charted for 74 weeks and sold more than 680,000 copies.

== Track listing ==
Regular Edition

All lyrics are written by Yui; all music is composed by Yui, except noted.

CD
No.	Title	Music	Arranger(s)	Length
1.	"How Crazy"		northa+	3:38
2.	"Rolling Star"		northa+	3:08
3.	"It's All Right"		northa+	3:37
4.	"I Remember You"		northa+, Strings arrangements: Ittetsu Gen	4:05
5.	"RUIDO"	Kenji Ogura	Kenji Ogura	0:51
6.	"CHE.R.RY"		northa+	3:29
7.	"Thank You My Teens"		Shigezo	2:57
8.	"Umbrella"		northa+	4:16
9.	"Highway Chance"	COZZi	COZZi	3:54
10.	"Happy Birthday To You You"		northa+	4:01
11.	"Winding Road"		northa+	3:39
12.	"Good-bye Days"		Akihisa Matzura	4:33
13.	"Why?"		northa+	3:13

Limited Edition

All lyrics are written by Yui; all music is composed by Yui, except noted.

CD
No.	Title	Music	Arranger(s)	Length
1.	"How Crazy"		northa+	3:38
2.	"Rolling Star"		northa+	3:08
3.	"It's All Right"		northa+	3:37
4.	"I Remember You"		northa+, Strings arrangements: Ittetsu Gen	4:05
5.	"Ruido"	Kenji Ogura	Kenji Ogura	0:51
6.	"Cherry"		northa+	3:29
7.	"Thank You My Teens"		Shigezo	2:57
8.	"Umbrella"		northa+	4:16
9.	"Highway Chance"	COZZi	COZZi	3:54
10.	"Happy Birthday to You You"		northa+	4:01
11.	"Winding Road"		northa+	3:39
12.	"Good-bye Days"		Akihisa Matzura	4:33
13.	"Why?"		northa+	3:13

DVD
No.	Title	Length
1.	"Feel My Soul" (Music video)
2.	"Tomorrow's Way" (Music video)
3.	"Life (Music video)" (Music video)
4.	"Tokyo" (Music video)

== Charts and sales ==
=== Oricon sales charts (Japan) ===
Release	Chart	Peak position	First week sales	Sales total	Chart run
4 April 2007	Oricon Daily Chart	1			
4 April 2007	Oricon Weekly Chart	1	290,640	682,585	52 weeks
4 April 2007	Oricon Monthly Chart	2			
4 April 2007	Oricon Yearly Chart (2007)	8			
4 April 2007	Oricon Yearly Chart (2008)	202			
