= Summer Song (Yui song) =

- CD Normal Edition Cover

Single by Yui

from the album Holidays in the Sun
- Released: July 2, 2008
- Genre: J-pop
- Label: Sony Music Japan
- Songwriters: Yui (lyrics & music)
- Producer: Hisashi Kondo

Yui singles chronology
"Namidairo" (2007)	"Summer Song" (2008)	"Again" (2009)

"Summer Song" is the twelfth single by Japanese pop singer-songwriter Yui. The single was released on July 2, 2008. "Summer Song" was aired on the last episode of Yui Locks on May 29, 2008.

The Limited Edition includes a special postcard of Yui with a message written by her, an original summer calendar card sticker with Yui picture on it & bonus DVD.

== Background and writing ==
In interviews with Japanese magazines Pati Pati and Zipper, Yui said she finished the entirety of the song in 2005. However, due to timing issues, as she would prefer to release it during the summer, the song was delayed until the release on July 2, 2008. In writing the lyrics, Yui said she wanted to imbue a feeling of, "wanting to get by with my own ability", and an image of, "longing to go to the sea". She also said she wrote the song from a girl's perspective, while recollecting her own memories she'd seen during past summers.

The title "Summer Song" was chosen by Yui as she felt the feelings in the song could be expressed through the title. Before the single, no Japanese artist has ever taken the song title "Summer Song", which was also instrumental in the choosing of the title.

== Music video ==
The music video begins with Yui playing guitar on a wooden platform and on a grassy field, and a girl making a picture frame with her hands and capturing various scenes of summer. After drawing pool-cleaning duties along with a boy, they spray water at each other and run around the drained pool. In the middle of the video, the girl is shown holding two tickets to a fireworks festival, and quickly putting them away when the boy looks at her. At the end of the video, the girl manages to gather her courage and ask the boy to come with her, which he gratefully accepts.

The actors in the music video are the same as those starred in Yui's "Laugh Away" video, with model Anri Okamoto playing the leading actress and Hayashi Kento playing the leading actor. The same couple would act in Yui's fifteenth single, "Gloria".

== Track listing ==
Normal Edition

All tracks are written by Yui.

CD
No.	Title	Arranger(s)	Length
1.	"Summer Song"	northa+	3:30
2.	"Oh My God"	northa+	2:47
3.	"Laugh Away ~Yui Acoustic Version~"	Yui & northa+	4:15
4.	"Summer Song ~Instrumental~"	northa+	3:30

Limited Edition

Normal Edition + DVD

DVD
No.	Title	Length
1.	"Summer Song" (Video clip)
2.	"Laugh Away ~Yui Acoustic Version~" (Video clip)

== Certifications ==
Certifications for "Summer Song"
Region	Certification	Certified units/sales
Japan (RIAJ) Physical sales	Gold	100,000^{^}
Japan (RIAJ) Digital sales	Platinum	250,000^{*}
Streaming
Japan (RIAJ)	Platinum	100,000,000^{†}
^{*} Sales figures based on certification alone.^{^} Shipments figures based on certification alone.^{†} Streaming-only figures based on certification alone.
