= Green a.Live =

- Normal Edition Cover

Single by Yui

from the album How Crazy Your Love
- A-side: "Green a.Live"
- B-side: Let's face it; Hello: Yui Acoustic Version
- Released: October 5, 2011
- Recorded: 2011
- Genre: J-pop
- Length: 16 minutes
- Label: Gr8! Records
- Songwriter: Yui

Yui singles chronology
"Hello (Paradise Kiss)" (2011)	"Green a.Live" (2011)	"Fight" (2012)

"Green a.Live" is the twentieth single by Japanese pop singer-songwriter Yui. It was released on October 5, 2011, and is featured in Yui's fifth studio album, How Crazy Your Love.

The single debuted atop the Oricon Weekly Rankings, becoming her first number one single since "To Mother" and eighth overall.

== Background and writing ==
"Green a.Live" was arranged and produced by Hisashi Kondo, with the lyrics written by Yui.

In Yui's Rocking in Japan interview, she indicated that Green a.Live was not about aspiring for an easy solution for dilemmas but about going through those hardships. She also recalled her visit to various schools in the Miyagi prefecture affected by the 2011 Tōhoku earthquake, and how the smiles of the schoolchildren despite the disaster gave her inspiration. In her diary entry on October 5, 2011, she also added that the song was also meant to show the anger and doubt from loved ones missing after the earthquake.

== Music video ==
The music video was directed by Shigeaki Kubo and was taken in Hokkaido, Japan. While filming, Kubo reflected that the song was an achingly honest song, as well as thinking that the song was about the eventual change which people undergo and the different paths they take.

The song begins with shots of Yui at a train track or of her playing guitar in a rice paddy. The music video then proceeds between cuts of her playing guitar at a grassy field or at a beach, and juxtaposing the shots of nature with various perspectives of a city in motion. The video ends with Yui smiling as she sings the final lyrics of the song.

== Track list ==
All tracks are written by Yui.

No.	Title	Arranger	Length
1.	"Green a.Live"	Hisashi Kondo	4:39
2.	"Let's Face it"	Cozzi	3:04
3.	"Hello (Paradise Kiss) ~Yui Acoustic Version~"	Kondo	3:39
4.	"Green a.Live ~Instrumental~"	Kondo	4:39

Limited Edition bonus DVD
No.	Title	Director	Length
1.	"Hello (Paradise Kiss)" (music video)	Shigeaki Kubo	3:38

== Sales charts (Japan) ==
=== Oricon Sales chart ===
Release	Chart	Peak position	Debut sales	Sales total	Chart run
October 5, 2011	Oricon Daily Singles Chart	1	24,370		
October 5, 2011	Oricon Weekly Singles Chart	1	55,978	69,912	4 weeks
October 5, 2011	Oricon Monthly Singles Chart	8	69,912		
October 5, 2011	Oricon Yearly Singles Chart				
