= 2008 MTV Video Music Awards Japan =

Annual Japanese music awards ceremony

- Date: May 31, 2008
- Location: Saitama Super Arena, Saitama, Saitama, Japan
- Hosted by: Cyril
- Website: mtvjapan.com/mvaj

Television/radio coverage
- Network: MTV Japan

The 2008 MTV Video Music Awards Japan were held on Saturday, May 31 at Saitama Super Arena in Saitama, Japan.

== Awards ==
Winners are in bold text.

=== Video of the Year ===
Exile — "I Believe"

- Mr. Children — "Irodori"
- Rihanna featuring Jay-Z — "Umbrella"
- Tokyo Incidents — "OSCA"
- Kanye West — "Stronger"

=== Album of the Year ===
Exile — Exile Love

- Ketsumeishi — Ketsunopolice 5
- Kumi Koda — Kingdom
- Avril Lavigne — The Best Damn Thing
- Ne-Yo — Because of You

=== Best Male Video ===
Ne-Yo — "Because of You"

- Chris Brown featuring T-Pain — "Kiss Kiss"
- Ken Hirai — "Fake Star"
- Tamio Okuda — "Mugen no Kaze"
- Seamo — "Cry Baby"

=== Best Female Video ===
Fergie — "Big Girls Don't Cry"

- Alicia Keys — "No One"
- Kumi Koda — "Ai no Uta"
- Mika Nakashima — "Life"
- Ai Otsuka — "Peach"

=== Best Group Video ===
M-Flo Loves Emi Hinouchi, Ryohei, Emyli, Yoshika and Lisa — "Love Comes and Goes"

- Maroon 5 — "Makes Me Wonder"
- Mr. Children — "Irodori"
- Rip Slyme — "I.N.G"
- Sum 41 — "Underclass Hero"

=== Best New Artist ===
Motohiro Hata — "Uroko"

- Erika — "Free"
- Mika — "Grace Kelly"
- Satomi Takasugi — "Tabibito"
- Amy Winehouse — "Rehab"

=== Best Rock Video ===
Radwimps — "Order Made"

- 9mm Parabellum Bullet — "Discommunication"
- Foo Fighters — "The Pretender"
- L'Arc-en-Ciel — "Seventh Heaven"
- Linkin Park — "What I've Done"

=== Best Pop Video ===
Avril Lavigne — "Girlfriend"

- Fergie — "Clumsy"
- M-Flo Loves Emi Hinouchi, Ryohei, Emyli, Yoshika and Lisa — "Love Comes and Goes"
- Ai Otsuka — "Peach"
- Yui — "Love & Truth"

=== Best R&B Video ===
Namie Amuro — "Hide & Seek"

- AI — "I'll Remember You"
- Mary J. Blige featuring Lil Mama — "Just Fine"
- Chris Brown featuring T-Pain — "Kiss Kiss"
- Miliyah Kato featuring Wakadanna — "Lalala"

=== Best Hip-Hop Video ===
Soulja Boy — "Crank That"

- 50 Cent featuring Justin Timberlake and Timbaland — "Ayo Technology (She Wants It)"
- Kreva — "Strong Style"
- Kanye West — "Stronger"
- T.I. — "Big Things Poppin'

=== Best Reggae Video ===
Shōnan no Kaze — "Suirenka"

- Fire Ball — "Place in your Heart"
- Sean Kingston — "Beautiful Girls"
- Mavado — "Dreaming"
- Pushim — "Hey Boy"

=== Best Dance Video ===
The Chemical Brothers — "Do It Again"

- Denki Groove — "Shounen Young"
- Justice — "D.A.N.C.E."
- Shinichi Osawa — "Our Song (A Lonely Girl Ver.)"
- Ryukyudisko featuring Beat Crusaders — "Nice Day"

=== Best Video From a Film ===
Hikaru Utada — "Beautiful World" (from Evangelion: 1.0 You Are (Not) Alone)

- Ketsumeishi — "Deai no Kakera" (from Kage Hinata ni Saku)
- Linkin Park — "What I've Done" (from Transformers)
- Snow Patrol — "Signal Fire" (from Spider-Man 3)
- Yui — "Love & Truth" (from Closed Note)

=== Best Collaboration ===
Kumi Koda featuring TVXQ — "Last Angel"

- Beyoncé and Shakira — "Beautiful Liar"
- Yuna Ito x Celine Dion — "A World to Believe In"
- Toshinobu Kubota meets Kreva — "M☆A☆G☆I☆C"
- Timbaland featuring The Hives — "Throw It On Me"

=== Best Karaokee! Song ===
Exile — "Toki no Kakera"

- Avril Lavigne — "Girlfriend"
- Mika Nakashima — "Life"
- Ne-Yo — "Because of You"
- Shōnan no Kaze — "Suireka"

=== Red Hot Award ===
Infinity 16

- Funky Monkey Babys
- Megumi
- Satomi Takasugi
- Foxxi MisQ

=== Best buzz ASIA ===
==== Japan ====
Ai — "I'll Remember You"

- AAA — "Mirage"
- Double — "Spring Love"
- Micro — "Hana Uta"
- DJ Ozma — "Tokyo Boogie Back"

==== South Korea ====
Cherry Filter — "Feel It"

- Clazziquai — "Robotica"
- JYP — "Kiss"
- Leessang — "Ballerino"
- T — "Did You Forget"

==== Taiwan ====
Andy Lau — "One"

- Eason Chan — "Long time no see"
- Jay Chou — "Cowboy On The Run"
- Wang Leehom — "Falling Leaf Returns to Root"
- Sodagreen — "Incomparable Beauty"

== Special awards ==
=== MTV Video Vanguard Award ===
Mariah Carey

=== MTV Rock The World Award ===
Takeshi Kobayashi and Kazutoshi Sakurai

== Live performances ==
- Ayaka — "Okaeri"
- Exile — "24 karats-type EX"
- Fergie — "Big Girls Don't Cry"
- Mariah Carey — "I'll Be Lovin' U Long Time"
- Nelly and Fergie — "Party People"
- Orange Range — "O2"
- Simple Plan — "When I'm Gone"

=== Red carpet live ===
- Colbie Caillat
- Flo Rida
- Miliyah Kato
- W-inds
