= How Crazy Your Love =

Studio album by Yui
- Released: November 2, 2011
- Recorded: 2010–2011
- Genres: Pop, pop rock
- Label: gr8! Records
- Producer: Hisashi Kondo

Yui chronology
Holidays in the Sun (2010)	How Crazy Your Love (2011)	Green Garden Pop (2012)

Singles from How Crazy Your Love
- 1. "Rain" Released: November 24, 2010; 2. "It's My Life/Your Heaven" Released: January 26, 2011; 3. "Hello (Paradise Kiss)" Released: June 1, 2011; 4. "Green a.Live" Released: October 5, 2011

How Crazy Your Love is the fifth studio album by Japanese singer-songwriter Yui, released on November 2, 2011. It became her fifth consecutive album to top the Oricon charts, becoming the first female artist to do so since Utada Hikaru's (Note: Oricon published their ranking prior to Utada coming out as non-binary.) Utada Hikaru Single Collection Vol. 2, which was released in 2010.

== Background and writing ==
The title signifies "how much is your affection" as Yui revealed during an interview by Oricon. Summarizing, she stated it was an album which asked the listener about his or her emotions.

Using this idea, she placed "Green a.Live" at the end of the album since it was a song which contained many questions on feelings. To place the other songs, she wanted the order to have variation; for example, she would put rock songs then acoustic songs.

In writing the song, she decided to attempt different styles of music. She especially singled out "Separation" for its funky rhythm, or an attempt at thrilling the audience in "Lock On". Not only trying complicated rhythms, she also recalled the simple triple used in "Cooking", a rhythm which she had always wanted to try out. Along the same lines, Yui wanted this album to represent trying something new, and that it also represents her desire to have the freedom to make music as she desires.

== Track listing ==
Regular edition

CD
No.	Title	Arranger(s)	Length
1.	"Hello"	Hisashi Kondo	3:35
2.	"Separation"	Hisashi Kondo	3:08
3.	"Get Back Home"	Hisashi Kondo	3:29
4.	"Lock On"	Hisashi Kondo	3:33
5.	"U-niform"	Northa+	2:59
6.	"Cooking"	Hisashi Kondo	3:20
7.	"Rain"	Hisashi Kondo	4:01
8.	"Good night"	Hisashi Kondo	0:43
9.	"You"	Hisashi Kondo	3:56
10.	"It's My Life"	Hisashi Kondo	3:14
11.	"No Reason"	Northa+	3:18
12.	"Nobody knows"	Cozzi	4:37
13.	"Green a.live"	Hisashi Kondo	4:40

== Charts ==
Chart (2011)	Peak position
Japan Oricon Daily Album Chart	1
Japan Oricon Weekly Album Chart	1
Japan Oricon Monthly Album Chart	3
Japan Oricon Yearly album chart	35
