= Rain (Yui song) =

Single by Yui

from the album How Crazy Your Love
- A-side: "Rain"
- B-side: "A Room"
- Released: November 24, 2010
- Recorded: 2010 (Japan)
- Venue: Osaka, Japan
- Genre: J-pop
- Length: 16:32
- Label: Sony Music Records
- Songwriter(s): Yui (lyrics & music)
- Producer(s): Hisashi Kondo

Yui singles chronology
"To Mother" (2010)	"Rain" (2010)	"It's My Life/Your Heaven" (2011)

"Rain" is the seventeenth single by Japanese pop singer-songwriter Yui. It was released on November 24, 2010. The title song is a tie-in for the Fuji TV drama series Perfect Report. The single reached number 2 on the Oricon chart.

== Music video and lyrics ==
The music video for "Rain" alternates between cuts of Yui and her band playing in the rain and Yui herself running through a rainy street towards a Christmas gift shop. Around the middle of the music video, a happier past is shown through flashbacks of Yui smiling and receiving earrings on a sunny day, along with the lines: "They try to bring back memories / Which are already gone / No matter what I do, I can't get rid of the past." (Note: Original text: 失い続けた / 記憶がよぎる / どうしたって / 過去はなくせない) The video eventually ends with an image of hope for the future, with the lyrics: "When someday this rain turns to snow / And slowly consumes this sadness / I'll be greeted by new hope. (Note: Original text: "この雨がいつか粉雪になって / 悲しみをそっと包み込むとき / 新しい希望に出会うの")

== Track listing ==
All tracks are written by Yui

No.	Title	Arranger(s)	Length
1.	"Rain"	Hisashi Kondo	4:03
2.	"A Room"	Northa+	4:41
3.	"How Crazy ~Yui Acoustic Version~"	Yui & Northa+	3:46
4.	"Rain ~Instrumental~"	Hisashi Kondo	4:01

DVD
No.	Title	Director	Length
1.	"Rain (Music Video)"	Shigeaki Kubo
2.	"Please Stay With Me (Music Video)"	Tsuchiya Takatoshi

== Oricon sales chart (Japan) ==
Chart (2010)	Peak position	First week sales	Sales total
Japan Oricon Daily Single	1		
Japan Oricon Weekly Single	2	67,796	83,706
Japan Oricon Yearly Single	86		

The single was certified gold by the RIAJ for having more than 100,000 copies shipped to stores.
