= Mi (Flower Flower album) =

- CD/DVD limited edition and digital download editions' cover

Studio album by Flower Flower
- Released: November 26, 2014
- Recorded: 2013–2014
- Genre: Shoegazing; indie pop
- Length: 59:10
- Language: Japanese
- Label: Sony Music Records
- Producer: Flower Flower

Flower Flower chronology
Mi (2014)	Shiki (2015)

Singles from Mi
- 1. "Tsuki" Released: July 3, 2013; 2. "Kamisama" Released: May 21, 2014; 3. "Subarashii Sekai" Released: October 1, 2014

Mi (実, "Fruit") is the debut studio album by Japanese band Flower Flower, released on November 26, 2014.

== Background and development ==
Flower Flower was first formed in early 2013. It was the second musical project of vocalist Yui, who originally debuted as a solo artist in 2005. After five studio albums, Yui announced her intention to retire from music as a soloist after the release of her two greatest hits albums in December 2012. The band started with recording sessions, followed by a series of secret lives across Japan in March 2013. The project was officially announced in April 2013, followed by a series of festival performances. The group released their first single "Tsuki" digitally in June.

Two more songs were released from the album as digital singles: "Kamisama", a stock song from their setlists, was released on May 21, while "Subarashii Sekai" was released on October 1. The cover artwork for "Subarashii Sekai" would later grace the cover of the album itself, despite being released before the album's announcement.

== Writing and production ==
The album was recorded at various recording studios in Tokyo. All songs featured lyrics written exclusively by Yui, however most of the songs were composed by the band as a single entity. Three songs were composed solely by Yui: "Tōmei na Uta", "Ohayō no Kiss o" and "Kimi no Koto". Yui felt that with Flower Flower, they could make any sound they wanted, but with Mi the strongest feeling she had was of destruction. The song "Kamisama" was the first song where Yui played the electric guitar.

The booklet and cover artwork were designed by Coa Graphics, and featured illustration by artist Natsuko Fujii.

== Promotion and release ==
In June 2013 the song "Tsuki" was used in a commercial campaign for cellphone provider au, which featured Yui personally as the spokesperson appearing in the advertisements. The song "Subarashii Sekai" aired as the TV Tokyo drama Tamagawa-ku of the Dead's theme song, which started airing on October 3, 2014.

The album was first announced on October 22. Tracks from the album were released on a weekly basis in the build up to the album's release. The first song was "Tōmei na Uta" released on October 29, followed by "Kūki" on November 5, "Kimi no Koto" on November 12 and "Byebye" on November 19.

== Critical reception ==
Music magazine Musica featured three reviews of the album. Tohbo Sakuma felt that much of the album had a live music sound, and that the release had the feel of rock and roll, even though it was not in that genre. Akinori Yamamoto of the band Lite felt that Flower Flower was a project that shifted the focus of Yui's music away from the melody, and towards the entire composition of the songs. He noted most of the songs featured messages, and felt that the album was "serious and reassuring". Daichi Yajima noted the strong emotive quality of Yui's voice in the album's songs.

Both Sakuma and Yajima praised "Hikari", with Sakuma feeling it was one of the most memorable songs on the album due to its shoegazing sound, Yui's "floating" vocals, and its message of facing up against absurdity in the world. Yamamoto singled out the song "Start Line" as having one of the most special compositions of the album. Yajima also singled out the song "Seki o Tatsu" for the "uneasy atmosphere" created by the song's "inorganic keyboard phrases".

== Track listing ==
All lyrics are written by Yui

No.	Title	Music	Length
1.	"Negai" (願い, "Wish")	Flower Flower	6:15
2.	"Kamisama" (神様, "God")	Flower Flower	3:25
3.	"Kūki" (空気, "Air")	Flower Flower	5:06
4.	"Tōmei na Uta" (とうめいなうた, "Transparent Song")	Yui	5:21
5.	"Ohayō no Kiss o" (おはようのキスを, "Morning Kiss")	Yui	5:06
6.	"Suiteki" (水滴, "Drop of Water")	Flower Flower	5:11
7.	"Subarashii Sekai" (素晴らしい世界, "Wonderful World")	Flower Flower	3:42
8.	"Seki o Tatsu" (席を立つ, "Standing Up Out of His Seat")	Flower Flower	4:27
9.	"Hikari" (ひかり, "Light")	Flower Flower	7:07
10.	"Kimi no Koto" (きみのこと, "About You")	Yui	6:51
11.	"Start Line" (スタートライン Sutāto Rain)	Flower Flower	5:50
12.	"Tsuki" (月, "Moon")	Flower Flower	4:41
13.	"Byebye" (バイバイ Baibai)	Flower Flower	6:08
Total length:			59:10

DVD: Live at Shibuya Club Quattro 2013.10.07
No.	Title	Length
1.	"Seki o Tatsu"
2.	"Kamisama"
3.	"Start Line"
4.	"Tsuki"
5.	"Subarashii Sekai"
6.	"Byebye"
7.	"Negai"

== Personnel ==
Personnel details were sourced from Yankee's liner notes booklet.

Performance credits

- Mafumafu – bass
- Mura Jun – keyboards, programming
- Sacchan – drums
- Yui – vocals, guitar

Technical and production

- Flower Flower – arrangement, production
- Uni Inoue – recording, mixing
- Shigeo Miyamoto – mastering
- Kunio Nishikawara – pre-production engineer
- Jun Watanabe – assistant engineer

== Chart rankings ==
Chart (2014)	Peak position
Japan Oricon weekly albums	5
South Korea Gaon international weekly albums	24

=== Sales ===
Chart	Amount
Oricon physical sales	34,000

== Release history ==
Region	Date	Format	Distributing Label	Catalogue codes
Japan	November 26, 2014	CD, CD/DVD, digital download, lossless digital download	Sony Music Japan	SRCL-8497, SRCL-8499
Taiwan	November 28, 2014	CD	Sony Music Taiwan	88875047032
Asia	November 28, 2014	digital download	Sony Music	
South Korea	December 2, 2014	CD, digital download	Sony Music Korea	2465185
Worldwide	December 3, 2014	digital download	Sony Music	
Japan	December 23, 2014	rental CD	Sony Music Japan	SRCL-8499
