= Orange Garden Pop =

ORANGE GARDEN POP

Compilation album by Yui
- Released: December 5, 2012
- Genres: Pop, pop rock
- Labels: Sony Music Japan, Gr8!

CD + DVD

Orange Garden Pop (stylized as ORANGE GARDEN POP) is the second compilation album by Japanese singer-songwriter Yui. It was released on December 5, 2012, simultaneously with another compilation album Green Garden Pop. The album reached #3 on Oricon. It was certified Platinum by the Recording Industry Association of Japan. In South Korea, the album reached #87 on the Gaon Album Chart.

In November 2012, a couple of weeks before the release of the album, Yui announced her decision to go on a hiatus at the end of the year. The album was described as YUI's first and probably last "best of" album.

== Track listing ==
CD
No.	Title	Length
1.	"CHE.R.RY"	3:34
2.	"feel my soul"	3:47
3.	"GLORIA"	3:41
4.	"to Mother"	3:50
5.	"Merry・Go・Round"	3:53
6.	"Tomorrow's way"	4:44
7.	"I'll be"	3:32
8.	"OH YEAH"	3:13
9.	"Rain"	4:01
10.	"Never say die"	2:41
11.	"es.car"	3:19
12.	"SUMMER SONG"	3:27
13.	"Happy Birthday to you"	4:01
14.	"Understand"	3:33
15.	"Separation"	3:09
16.	"It's My Life"	3:15
17.	"LOVE & TRUTH"	4:20
18.	"TOKYO"	4:06
