= Namidairo =

Single by Yui

from the album I Loved Yesterday
- Released: February 27, 2008
- Genre: J-pop
- Label: Sony Music Japan
- Songwriters: Yui (lyrics & music)
- Producer: Hisashi Kondo

Yui singles chronology
"Love & Truth" (2007)	"Namidairo" (2008)	"Summer Song" (2008)

"Namidairo" is the eleventh single by Japanese pop singer-songwriter Yui. The single was released on February 27, 2008. The title song is a tie-up for the TV drama, 4 Shimai Tantei Dan.

== Background and writing ==
Yui began writing the lyrics soon after her concert at Nippon Budokan on November 19, 2007. In an interview with Excite in February 2008, she revealed the melody of the chorus was actually from her second single, Tomorrow's Way, but she only wrote it halfway. She completed the song by including new A and B melodies, and the lyrics.

Although told to write the theme song for the drama, she had the consent to write as she wished. Consequently, Yui tried not to put all the emphasis on "love", as was the main theme of 4 Shimai Tantei Dan, but on relationships between individuals as well.

The title, "Namidairo" (ナミダイロ), in Japanese literally means "tear-colored", but was officially translated as "the color of tears". Yui used this phrase to mean the crying of the heart.

== Music video ==
The music video was directed by Takahiro Miki. It begins with Yui playing guitar in a room. From thereon, the video cuts to Yui walking down a street or riding a bus alone, sitting in a telephone booth, or back to the room. The video ends with Yui in the telephone booth looking outward at floating lines of light.

== Track listing ==
Normal Edition

All tracks are written by Yui.

CD
No.	Title	Arranger(s)	Length
1.	"Namidairo"	northa+
2.	"I Wanna Be..."	northa+
3.	"Love & Truth ~Yui Acoustic Version~"	Yui & northa+
4.	"Namidairo ~Instrumental~"	northa+

Limited Edition

Normal Edition + DVD

DVD
No.	Title	Length
1.	"Namidairo" (Music Video)
2.	"Umbrella" (Unreleased video from live DVD Thank You My Teens)

== Oricon sales chart (Japan) ==
Release	Chart	Peak position	First week sales	Sales total	Chart run
February 27, 2008	Oricon Daily Singles Chart	3			
February 27, 2008	Oricon Weekly Singles Chart	3	81,730	115,168	10 weeks
February 27, 2008	Oricon Monthly Singles Chart	5			
February 27, 2008	Oricon Yearly Singles Chart	61			

"Namidairo" has been certified gold by RIAJ for shipment of 100,000 copies in Japan.
