= Green Garden Pop =

GREEN GARDEN POP

Compilation album by Yui
- Released: December 5, 2012
- Genres: Pop, pop rock
- Labels: Sony Music Japan, Gr8!

CD + DVD

Green Garden Pop (stylized as GREEN GARDEN POP) is the second compilation album by Japanese singer-songwriter Yui. It was released on December 5, 2012, simultaneously with another compilation album Orange Garden Pop. The album reached #2 on Oricon. It was certified Platinum by the Recording Industry Association of Japan. In South Korea, the album reached #86 on the Gaon Album Chart.

In November 2012, a couple of weeks before the release of the album, Yui announced her decision to go on a hiatus at the end of the year. The album was described as YUI's first and probably last "best of" album.

The anime Fullmetal Alchemist Brotherhood featured the song Again as its first intro theme, lasting from Episode 1, to episode 13.

== Track listing ==
CD
No.	Title	Length
1.	"HELLO"	3:35
2.	"How crazy"	3:39
3.	"again"	4:15
4.	"LIFE"	4:01
5.	"Laugh away"	4:21
6.	"My Generation"	3:55
7.	"Shake My Heart"	3:36
8.	"Rolling star"	3:10
9.	"Namidairo"	3:35
10.	"I do it (Stereopony cover)"	3:47
11.	"I remember you"	4:06
12.	"Green a.live"	4:39
13.	"It's all too much"	4:13
14.	"Please Stay With Me"	3:57
15.	"fight"	4:58
16.	"Your Heaven"	3:11
17.	"YOU"	3:57
18.	"Good-bye days"	4:37
