= Kaiji (film) =

2009 live action adaptation of the Kaiji manga

- Film poster
- Directed by: Tōya Satō
- Written by: Mika Ōmori
- Based on: Gambling Apocalypse: Kaiji by Nobuyuki Fukumoto
- Produced by: Seiji Okuda; Toshio Nakatani; Naoto Fujimura; Kazuhisa Kitajima; Masatoshi Yamaguchi
- Starring: Tatsuya Fujiwara; Yūki Amami; Teruyuki Kagawa
- Cinematography: Katsumi Yanagijima
- Music by: Yugo Kanno
- Production company: AX-ON
- Distributed by: Toho
- Release date: October 10, 2009
- Running time: 129 minutes
- Country: Japan
- Language: Japanese
- Box office: $25 million

Kaiji (Japanese: カイジ 人生逆転ゲーム, Hepburn: Kaiji: Jinsei Gyakuten Gēmu; lit. 'Kaiji: Life Turn-Around Game'), also known as Kaiji: The Ultimate Gambler, is a 2009 Japanese live-action film based on Gambling Apocalypse: Kaiji, the first part of the manga series Kaiji by Nobuyuki Fukumoto. It is the first installment of the Kaiji film series directed by Tōya Satō and premiered in Japan on October 10, 2009. It was followed by Kaiji 2, released in 2011.

== Plot ==
Kaiji is a 30-year-old man trapped in a life of mediocrity, working at a small shop and barely making ends meet. Though he longs for change, his aspirations remain unfulfilled until a loan shark named Rinko Endō confronts him about a co-signed debt left by a vanished acquaintance. Unable to repay the debt, Kaiji accepts Endō's offer to participate in a high-stakes gambling tournament aboard the ship Espoir, where success would erase his debt.

Once onboard, he realizes the true cost of failure: losing contestants are forced into brutal labor camps, constructing an underground city for a ruthless crime syndicate. The syndicate's second-in-command, Yukio Tonegawa, subjects the prisoners to increasingly cruel and deadly games. Determined to reclaim his freedom and transform his life, Kaiji resolves to outmaneuver the sadistic challenges before him.

== Cast ==
- Tatsuya Fujiwara as Kaiji Itō
- Yūki Amami as Rinko Endō
- Teruyuki Kagawa as Yukio Tonegawa
- Ken Mitsuishi as Kōji Ishida
- Kenichi Matsuyama as Makoto Sahara
- Tarō Yamamoto as Jōji Funai
- Suzuki Matsuo as Tarō Ōtsuki
- Kei Satō as Kazutaka Hyōdō

== Production ==
In October 2008, it was announced that the film would be directed by Tōya Satō and Tatsuya Fujiwara would star as Kaiji Itō. The Watarase Film Commission, a non-governmental organization that supports film production, posted a casting call for 70 men between the ages of 20 and 40 to be extras to play contestants of the "restricted rock-paper-scissors" game.

== Soundtrack ==
Yugo Kanno composed the music for the film. The original score was released on October 7, 2009. Two songs by Japanese pop singer-songwriter Yui were featured in the film, "It's All Too Much" and "Never Say Die", used as theme song and insert song respectively.

== Release ==
Kaiji was theatrically released on October 10, 2009 in Japan. It was released on Blu-ray and DVD on April 9, 2010.

In the UK, the film was released on DVD by 4Digital Media under the title Kaiji: The Ultimate Gambler on July 26, 2010.

== Reception ==
In September 2011, Goo Ranking conducted a web poll of "Live-Action Manga/Anime Adaptations That Worked" and Kaiji ranked sixth out of 38 live-action adaptations.

=== Box office ===
The film became Japan's sixteenth highest-grossing film of 2009, earning ¥2.25 billion ($25 million) at the box office that year. Overseas, the film grossed $460,073.

=== Critical reception ===
Carlo Santos of Anime News Network gave the film a C grade, praising its psychological tension and gambling theory for staying true to the source material. However, he criticized the flat characters, forced "closed-room" setups, and the clichéd "working-class hero versus evil old rich guy" dynamic, calling it more of a "fantasy" than a grounded story. He also noted the awkward plot adjustments made to condense the story into two hours. Chris MaGee from Toronto J-Film Pow-Wow called the film an awkward blend of Kani Kōsen's social critique, Battle Royale's intensity, and televised poker. He criticized the exaggerated performances of Fujiwara, Matsuyama, and Kagawa. MaGee dismissed the film as a self-indulgent spectacle, enjoyable only for its creators, and that for the audience "the whole experience is just painful."
