= Thank You My Teens =

Video by Yui
- Released: November 14, 2007
- Genre: J-pop
- Length: 0:55
- Label: Sony Music Entertainment

Thank You My Teens was the first live DVD release from Japanese singer Yui. She celebrated her twentieth birthday and thanked her teenage days with footage of her recent all-Japan concert tour and behind-the-scenes footage and video. The DVD features Yui's second tour Spring & Jump: Can't Buy My Love, a gig at the C.C. Lemon Hall in Shibuya. The tour includes places such as Hokkaido, Fukushima, and Okinawa.

The DVD has a hidden secret. On the Title Page of the DVD, when clicked on "Yui", there will be second sound channel featuring commentary by Yui and Shigezou san, host of Yui Radio, watching the DVD for the first time. They talk and comment about each scene and songs throughout the DVD so that fans can enjoy and feel like they are watching the DVD with Yui and Shigezou-san. The DVD also includes a Yui Sticker.

== Track listing ==
1. Opening
2. Rolling Star
3. Cherry
4. Tour Document 1
5. Happy Birthday to You You
6. Ruido
7. Life
8. Highway Chance
9. Tour Document 2
10. Good-bye Days
11. Tokyo
12. Tour Document 3
13. Thank You My Teens

== Sales chart (Japan) ==
Chart (2010)	Peak position
Japan Oricon DVD Chart	4
