= It's My Life/Your Heaven =

"It's My Life / Your Heaven"
- CD Normal Edition Cover

Single by Yui

from the album How Crazy Your Love
- A-side: "It's My Life & Your Heaven"
- B-side: "Rain: Yui Acoustic Version"
- Released: January 26, 2011
- Recorded: 2010–2011 (Japan)
- Genre: J-pop
- Label: Gr8! Records
- Songwriter(s): Yui

Yui singles chronology
"Rain" (2010)	"It's My Life / Your Heaven" (2011)	"Hello (Paradise Kiss)" (2011)

"It's My Life / Your Heaven" is the eighteenth single and third double A-side single by Japanese pop singer-songwriter Yui. The single was released on January 26, 2011.

== Background and writing ==
When asked about the first A-side single, "It's My Life", Yui responded with that song was created with the feeling in supporting people during hardships. She also connected this with the early part of her life, when she decided to quit school and to undertake the path of music. Furthermore, in reflecting on the song, Yui also talked about the fun part about being a musician, such as receiving goodwill messages or meeting a variety of people.

== Promotion and tie-ins ==
The A-side, "Your Heaven", was tied to Sony Walkman's "PlayYou" commercials, and other A-side was used as Japanese company, U-Can's campaign song for the 2011 year. In addition to the "Your Heaven" music video provided in the CD+DVD version of the single, a short movie was also included showing Yui's visit to Sweden for the shooting of the music video.

== Track listing ==
All tracks are written by Yui

No.	Title	Arranger(s)	Length
1.	"It's My Life"	Hisashi Kondo	3:18
2.	"Your Heaven"	Hisashi Kondo	3:14
3.	"Rain ~Yui Acoustic Version~"	Yui & Hisashi Kondo	4:00
4.	"It's My Life ~Instrumental~"	Hisashi Kondo	3:16

DVD
No.	Title	Length
1.	"Your Heaven (Video Clip)"
2.	"Yui in Sweden Special Movie"

== Sales Chart (Japan) ==
The single was certified gold by the RIAJ for having more than 100,000 copies shipped to stores.
