= Tokyo (Yui song) =

Single by Yui

from the album From Me to You
- Released: January 18, 2006
- Genre: J-pop
- Label: Sony Records
- Songwriters: Yui (lyrics & music); Cozzi (music)
- Producer: Yoshio Konno

Yui singles chronology
"Life" (2005)	"Tokyo" (2006)	"Good-bye Days" (2006)

"Tokyo" is the fourth single by the Japanese artist Yui. It was released January 18, 2006, under Sony Records.

The title track recounts her feelings as she left her hometown of Fukuoka to go to Tokyo, pursuing her music dreams according to the lyrics of the song.

The music video was directed by Takahiro Miki.

== Track listing ==
All lyrics are written by Yui.

CD
No.	Title	Music	Arranger(s)	Length
1.	"Tokyo"	COZZi	Yui & COZZi
2.	"Help"	Yui	Yui
3.	"Life ~Yui Acoustic Version~"	Yui	Yui & Northa+
4.	"Tokyo ~Instrumental~"	COZZi	Yui & COZZi

== Oricon Sales Chart (Japan) ==
Release	Chart	Peak position	Sales total
January 18, 2006	Oricon Weekly Singles Chart	15	20,123
