= From Me to You (Yui album) =

Studio album by Yui
- Released: February 22, 2006
- Recorded: 2005–2006
- Studio: Studio Fine; Studio Z'd; Studio Sound Valley
- Genre: Pop, pop rock
- Length: 49:50
- Label: Sony Records

Yui chronology
From Me to You (2006)	Can't Buy My Love (2007)

Singles from From Me To You
- 1. "Feel My Soul" Released: February 23, 2005; 2. "Tomorrow's Way" Released: June 22, 2005; 3. "Life" Released: November 9, 2005; 4. "Tokyo" Released: January 18, 2006

From Me to You (stylized in all caps) is the debut album by Japanese singer and songwriter Yui. It was released on February 22, 2006, by Sony Music Japan. The album title is derived from the Beatles's 1963 song "From Me to You." From Me to You is primarily a pop rock record with elements of folk rock and blues rock. Lyrically, it explores themes of love, frustration, and relationships.

Upon its release, the album received positive reviews from music critics. They commended the composition and her songwriting skills, and a few critics selected the singles as some of the best material in her discography. Commercially, From Me To You was pretty successful. It reached number four on Japan's Oricon Albums Chart, and was certified platinum by the Recording Industry Association of Japan (RIAJ) for shipments of over 250,000 units nationwide.

To promote the album, Sony Music Japan released four singles from it: "Feel My Soul" was released as Yui's major-label debut single on February 23, 2005. It was a commercial success, peaking at number eight on the Oricon Singles Chart and receiving a gold certification from the RIAJ. The single "Life," which was released on November 9, 2005, was a commercial success, reaching number nine and selling over 100,000 legal downloads in the country. "Tomorrow's Way" and "Tokyo" were moderate hits, both peaking at number fifteen. Yui promoted the album by embarking on a live house tour from March to April 2006.

== Background and development ==
In March 2004, upon the recommendation of a person associated with her school Voice, Yui applied for the Sony Music Group's SD audition, and was one of the 10 finalists selected out of approximately 20,000 applicants. She sang "Why Me" and "It's Happy Line" in the audition, which required her to perform two songs. But she really wanted the audience to hear her, so she added a shortened version of "I Know," which didn't have lyrics at the time. All the judges gave her the highest score. She hurried home because she was afraid she would be scolded for singing three songs, but she ended up getting scolded by the audition staff later. Thereafter, each Sony Music Group label competed with each other for her debut. While preparing for her debut, she wrote the original song "Feel My Soul" before the summer; she continued to live back and forth between Tokyo and Fukuoka, but later decided to move to Tokyo in the fall when a dorama tie-up was decided upon. On December 24, 2004, she released the single "It's Happy Line" on an indie label, limited with only 1,000 copies to her hometown.

The title for From Me to You was inspired by the Beatles, which became the inspiration for Yui's subsequent album titles. Yui contributed to the album as the main songwriter and composer, with Yuka Matsumoto cowriting. Recording sessions were handled at Studio Fine, Studio Z'd and Studio Sound Valley in Tokyo between 2005 and 2006. The final material was then mixed by Yasuhisa Kataoka, and mastered by Yuji Chinone at Sony Music Studios, Tokyo. The album had reportedly completed production on January 27, 2006.

== Writing and composition ==
The songs on this album were selected from songs produced during her indie days. In addition, while many of the songs on the previous singles were about herself, the newly recorded songs were about love. About this, Yui stated: "I wrote the songs by comparing my differences with others and my inability to communicate well with them to love."

"Merry・Go・Round" is a guitar rock song that combines lyrics that compare a love affair that goes awry to a "merry-go-round." The song "Feel My Soul" is a mid-tempo rock tune that sings of the determination to keep moving forward despite struggles. "Ready to Love" is a song that depicts pure love with a melody full of ups and downs. "Swing of Lie" is blends elements of blues rock and folk rock into its melody. "Life" has the theme of struggling to achieve your dreams.

"Blue Wind" is a midtempo mellow tune played with an acoustic guitar that rides on the simple beat. "I Can't Say" is an organic, folky number that depends just on the acoustic guitar and vocals; the lyrics revolve around a girl who can't be honest with her boyfriend and express her feelings. "Simply White" depicts the theme of wanting to live as simply as possible. "Just My Way" is a groove-filled rock tune that sings about not finding your keys just before going out. "Tomorrow's Way" is a medium-tempo ballad with a message that humans are born to make their dreams come true. "I Know" carries a blues-like melody. "Tokyo" is a guitar-driven ballad that lyrically recounts Yui's feelings when she left her hometown of Fukuoka to go to Tokyo in order to pursue her music dreams. "Spiral & Escape" is themed around her feelings towards a boy who is timid about love.

== Title and artwork ==
The title From Me to You is derived from the fact that before her major label debut, she sang to herself, but after her major label debut, she felt more gratitude to the listeners who listened to her music. Kenshu Shintsubo shot the album artwork and photoshoot; the CD artwork depicts Yui holding a red electric guitar in a blurred photo. The art direction and the album's booklet was designed by Koichi Honda.

== Promotion ==
=== Singles and other songs ===
Four singles were released to promote From Me To You. "Feel My Soul" was released as the album's lead single and Yui's major-label debut on February 23, 2005. The song was used as the theme song for the dorama Fukigen na jiin starring Yuko Takeuchi. The single peaked at number eight on the Oricon Singles Chart, and was certified gold by the Recording Industry Association of Japan (RIAJ) for shipping over 100,000 units. "Tomorrow's Way" was released as the album's second single on June 22, 2005; it was used as the ending theme for the movie Hinokio. The single reached the 15th position, charted for ten weeks and sold 32,391 copies.

"Life" was released as the albums third single on November 9, 2005. The song was chosen as the ending theme for the TV Tokyo anime Bleach; this marked the first time Yui worked on an anime tie-up. It debuted at number nine on the Oricon Singles Chart, making it the first time since "Feel My Soul" that one of her songs has entered the top ten, and has since been certified gold by the RIAJ for selling over 100,000 cellphone downloads. "Tokyo" was released as the fourth and final single on January 18, 2006. It reached number 15 on the weekly Oricon chart and charted for five weeks, selling 20,123 copies. It was her first single to be released without a tie-up.

=== Live appearances and tours ===
Yui promoted the album with a series of live performances and appearances throughout Japan. From March 21, 2006, to April 18, 2006, she embarked on her very first concert tour called "YUI First Tour 2006 "7 street" ~LIVE LIFE LOVE~," which was performed at live houses across the country in support of her first album. On August 6, 2006, she performed at the Rock in Japan Festival at Hitachi Seaside Park. On December 29, 2006, she performed at Japan's largest New Year's Eve rock festival Countdown Japan.

== Reception ==
Upon its release, From Me To You received favorable reviews from most music critics. A staff member from CDJournal enjoyed the album, saying that is carries a skillful sound that expresses innocence and that the vocals are convincing. Alexey Eremenko, who contributed in writing the biography of Yui at AllMusic, highlighted the album songs "Tomorrow's Way," "Feel My Soul," "Tokyo" and "Life" as some of her greatest works.

Commercially, the album fared well in Japan. From Me To You debuted at number three on the daily Oricon Albums Chart, and number four on the weekly chart. The album sold approximately 67,771 copies on its first week of availability. It descended to number nine the following week, with sales of 25,215 copies. In all, the album stayed in the top 300 chart for 121 weeks. Additionally, it was ranked the 70th best-selling album of 2006 with 180,657 copies sold in Japan throughout the fiscal year. From Me To You sold 292,175 copies by the time its chart run had ended, earning the album a platinum certification from the Recording Industry Association of Japan (RIAJ).

== Track listing ==
All lyrics are written by Yui; all music is composed by Yui, except where otherwise noted.

CD
No.	Title	Lyrics	Music	Arranger(s)	Length
1.	"Merry・Go・Round"			Yui, Northa+	3:49
2.	"Feel My Soul"			Hideyuki "Daichi" Suzuki	3:48
3.	"Ready to love"	Yui, Yukamatsumoto	Cozzi	Cozzi	3:49
4.	"Swing of Lie"			Northa+	4:18
5.	"Life"			Northa+	4:01
6.	"Blue Wind"		Cozzi	Cozzi	4:11
7.	"I can't Say"		Cozzi	Cozzi	3:38
8.	"Simply White"			Northa+	3:37
9.	"Just my Way"	Yui, Yukamatsumoto		Northa+	3:22
10.	"Tomorrow's Way"			Hideyuki "Daichi" Suzuki	4:45
11.	"I Know"			Hideyuki "Daichi" Suzuki	3:05
12.	"Tokyo"		Cozzi	Yui, Cozzi	4:05
13.	"Spiral & Escape"			Ikoman	3:27

== Charts ==
=== Weekly charts ===
Chart (2006)	Peak position
Japanese Albums (Oricon)	4

=== Year-end charts ===
Chart (2006)	Position
Japanese Albums (Oricon)	70

== Certification and sales ==
Region	Certification	Certified units/sales
Japan (RIAJ)	Platinum	290,107
