= Rolling Star =

Single by Japanese singer Yui

Single by Yui

from the album Can't Buy My Love
- Released: January 17, 2007
- Recorded: 2006
- Genre: Pop rock
- Label: Studioseven Recordings
- Songwriters: Yui (lyrics & music)
- Producer: Hisashi Kondo

Yui singles chronology
"I Remember You" (2006)	"Rolling Star" (2007)	"Cherry" (2007)

"Rolling Star" is the seventh single of Japanese singer-songwriter Yui. It was released on January 17, 2007, by Studioseven Recordings, Yui's first under the label. An accompanying music video was directed by Takahiro Miki. The single has been certified Gold by the Recording Industry Association of Japan.

== Track listing ==
All tracks are written by Yui.

CD
No.	Title	Arranger(s)	Length
1.	"Rolling Star"	northa+	3:34
2.	"Winter Hot Music"	northa+
3.	"I Remember You ~Yui Acoustic Version~"	Yui & Hajime Mizoshita
4.	"Rolling Star ~Instrumental~"	northa+

== Commercial endorsements ==
"Rolling Star" is the second of Yui's songs to be used in the Bleach anime series, as its fifth opening theme"; her third single "Life" was used as the series' fifth closing theme. The instrumental version of "Rolling Star" was used in a Fairchild TV commercial for a singing competition in 2008..

== Charts ==
=== Oricon Sales Chart (Japan) ===
Release	Chart	Peak position	Sales total
January 17, 2007	Oricon Daily Singles Chart	3	
January 17, 2007	Oricon Weekly Singles Chart	4	169,277
January 17, 2007	Oricon Monthly Singles Chart	6	
January 17, 2007	Oricon Yearly Singles Chart	35	
