= My Generation/Understand =

Single by Yui

from the album I Loved Yesterday
- A-side: "My Generation / Understand"
- B-side: "Cherry (Acoustic Version) / My Generation (Instrumental)"
- Released: 13 June 2007
- Genre: J-pop
- Length: 14:49
- Label: Sony Music Japan
- Songwriters: Yui (lyrics & music)
- Producer: Hisashi Kondo

Yui singles chronology
"Cherry" (2007)	"My Generation/Understand" (2007)	"Love & Truth" (2007)

"My Generation/Understand" is the ninth single by the Japanese artist Yui. Even though this is a double-A single, "Understand" is not included on the album I Loved Yesterday, but the song is included in the B-side compilation album, My Short Stories. "My Generation" was used as the theme song for the drama Seito Shokun!.

== Track listing ==
All tracks are written by Yui.

CD
No.	Title	Arranger(s)	Length
1.	"My Generation"	northa+
2.	"Understand"	northa+
3.	"Cherry ~Yui Acoustic Version~"	Yui & northa+
4.	"My Generation ~Instrumental~"	northa+

== Charts ==
=== Oricon sales chart (Japan) ===
Release	Chart	Peak position	Sales total
June 13, 2007	Oricon Daily Singles Chart	1	
June 13, 2007	Oricon Weekly Singles Chart	1	135,093
June 13, 2007	Oricon Monthly Singles Chart	9	
June 13, 2007	Oricon Yearly Singles Chart	55	
