= Feel My Soul (song) =

Single by Yui

from the album From Me to You
- Released: February 23, 2005
- Genre: J-pop
- Label: Sony Records
- Songwriters: Yui (lyrics & music)
- Producer: Yoshihiko Nishio

Yui singles chronology
"It's Happy Line" (2004)	"Feel My Soul" (2005)	"Tomorrow's Way" (2005)

"Feel My Soul" is the first major label single by the Japanese artist Yui. It was released February 23, 2005, under Sony Records. This was Yui's first major single. Her previous single, "It's Happy Line", was released under Leaflet Records. The single was used as the opening theme to the J-Drama Fukigen na Gene. During its first week on Oricon, the single reached a peak of 8th place and would go on to become the 95th highest selling single of 2005.

"Feel My Soul" was also included in the album called, "Hit Style" which was distributed by Sony Music Entertainment (Japan). The album was released on 1 January 2006. It has 2 discs which have the hit songs from various artists. "Feel My Soul" is included in the second disc.

In 2024, a cover of the song was used in the ending of the anime Too Many Losing Heroines! sung by Momoka Terasawa, the voice actress of Chika Komari, one of the main characters of the anime.

== Track listing ==
All tracks are written by Yui.

CD
No.	Title	Arranger(s)	Length
1.	"Feel My Soul"	hideyuki DAICHI suzuki	3:50
2.	"Free Bird"	hideyuki DAICHI suzuki	2:58
3.	"Why Me"	hideyuki DAICHI suzuki	4:06
4.	"Feel My Soul ~Instrumental~"	hideyuki DAICHI suzuki	3:50

== Oricon Sales Chart (Japan) ==
Release	Chart	Peak position	Sales total
February 23, 2005	Oricon Weekly Singles Chart	8	
February 23, 2005	Oricon Yearly Singles Chart	95	107,930
