= Yui (singer) =

Japanese singer-songwriter (born 1987)

YUI ユイ
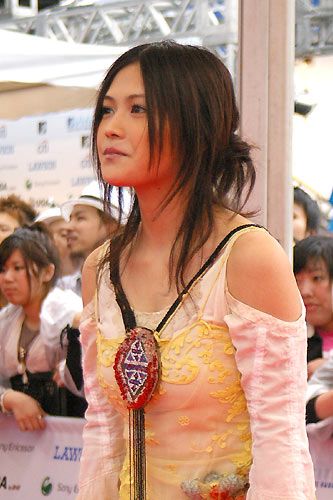
- Yui at the 2006 MTV Video Music Awards Japan in Tokyo

Background information
- Born: Yui Yoshioka (吉岡 ユイ); March 26, 1987 (age 39); Koga, Fukuoka, Japan
- Genres: Pop; rock
- Occupations: Singer-songwriter; musician
- Instruments: Vocals; guitar; bass guitar; piano; drums
- Years active: 2004–present
- Labels: Studioseven; Gr8!; Leaflet
- Member of: Flower Flower
- Website: www.yui-net.com

Yui Yoshioka (吉岡 ユイ, Yoshioka Yui; born March 26, 1987), known mononymously as YUI, is a Japanese singer-songwriter and multi-instrumentalist. In her solo career, she sold more than 5 million physical copies in Japan. She is popular in Japan and in surrounding countries, ranking number one in 2011 Count Down TV "Dearest Female Artist" and Music Station "Artist You Most Want to Marry" polls, as well as Radio Television Hong Kong's "Most Popular Japanese Artist".

Born and raised in Fukuoka Prefecture, she played live at various locations in her hometown before being noticed by Sony Music Japan when she was 17 years old, and released her debut single months later. Her singles, however, were only met with moderate success until the breakout "Good-bye Days", which charted for 44 weeks on Oricon and marked her as one of the Japanese music industry's rising stars. Since her debut album, From Me to You, each of her soloist album releases has topped the charts, with at least one single reaching number one on the Oricon charts from 2007 until her second hiatus in 2012, including five straight from mid-2008 to late 2010. After retiring from music as a soloist in 2012, she formed the band Flower Flower in 2013.

== Biography ==
Yui Yoshioka was born in Fukuoka, Japan.

She grew up in a single-parent family, her father leaving her mother when she was three. Growing up, Yui asserted that she had always been close to music, as she would remember the beats from music she heard on the radio, and would be able to sing it. During elementary school, Yui thought she would like to become a singer. Self-described as shy and horrible at talking to others as a child, she would play outside by herself in mountains, rivers, by the sea and in rice paddies.

During her third year in primary school, she was influenced by her mother to begin writing a journal of her feelings and tried to compose them into poems. By the time Yui attended high school, she began to write songs, thinking of that as being able to express herself little by little. While in high school, she worked part-time at a Chinese restaurant to help pay for tuition. Between music, school and work, however, she only had one or two hours of sleep, and believed she no longer had the time to realize her dreams of a music career. She subsequently became ill; however, it was at the hospital that she was overwhelmed with the desire to make music, and finally decided that school and music could not coexist.

Soon after leaving the hospital, she got a chance to see her first live street performance. She expressed a desire to pursue a musical career to the band, Bianco Nero, at the end of the concert. The band advised Yui to join a private music school, juku. Despite the social norm of finishing school in Japan and discouragement from her teachers, Yui did not hesitate to drop out of high school and began to study guitar and songwriting at the music cram school "Voice" in her hometown of Fukuoka. Aspiring to become a professional, she took to street performing at Fukuoka's Tenjin Station. These street performances helped Yui to overcome her shyness.

== Career ==
=== Initial career (2004–2005) ===
Yui's professional career began in March 2004 when, at the recommendation of her cram school instructors, she applied for an audition hosted by Sony Music Japan. Although instructed that a participant could only perform two songs, she first sang "Why Me" (a song later included in her debut Sony Records single), followed by "It's Happy Line," and then half of "I Know", performing the unfinished third song because she wanted the judges to hear a song full of hope.

The judges gave her the maximum score. Although "I Know" was incomplete at the time, the judges were able to get a glimpse of what would later be dubbed "Yui-go" (YUI語), or Yui-speak, nonsensical English hummed to a tune during her songwriting process. An example of Yui-go can be found in the film Song of the Sun.

On December 24, 2004, Yui released her debut single, "It's Happy Line", under the indie label Leaflet Records, coupled with the track "I Know," although the pressing was limited to only 2,000 copies in her home area.

=== From Me to You (2005–2006) ===
Upon leaving her hometown in Fukuoka for Tokyo, Yui wrote the song "Feel My Soul" as a tribute to her hometown. Although she initially had planned its release on an indie label, Fuji Television producer Yamaguchi was so inspired by Yui's voice that he insisted on having her work on the music for his primetime drama Fukigen na Gene, prior to releasing a major single. The music in Fukigen na Gene was eventually based on her songs "Feel My Soul" and "It's Happy Line."

On February 23, 2005, Yui released her first major debut single "Feel My Soul." With the publicity the drama tie-in drew in, "Feel My Soul" managed to sell over 100,000 copies and managed to chart at number 8 on Oricon Weekly Charts in its first week. Her next three singles, "Tomorrow's Way" (theme song for the movie Hinokio), "Life" (5th ending theme for the Bleach anime), and "Tokyo" did not chart as high as "Feel My Soul", and were only moderately successful in comparison. Yui released her debut album on February 22, 2006, titled From Me to You, a moderate success that debuted at number 4 on the Oricon charts, charting for 121 weeks.

=== Can't Buy My Love (2006–2007) ===
Yui made her acting debut in the full-length feature film Song of the Sun (Taiyou no uta, タイヨウのうた), which opened on June 17, 2006. The film was screened at the 2006 Cannes Film Festival. She had a unique way of approaching her role, such as imagining unscripted conversations between other characters and hers as well as staying in her character's room and fitting the aberrant sleeping patterns of her character to give herself a sense of her role. Yui attended the Japan Academy Prize, winning Best Newcomer Award for Midnight Sun. Prior to the release of the movie, Yui released her fifth single "Good-bye Days," written specifically for the film. The single is her highest selling single, with more than 200,000 copies sold. All three tracks on the single are featured in Midnight Sun. The single also re-released the track "It's Happy Line," originally released on her debut single.

Yui's next single, "I Remember You", did well in terms of sales, riding on the wave of the popularity of "Good-bye Days". Yui's seventh single "Rolling Star" was chosen as the 5th opening theme for the Bleach anime. Her eighth single, "Cherry" was featured in commercials promoting KDDI, a Listen Mobile Service.

She released her second album Can't Buy My Love on April 4, 2007. The album spent two weeks at number 1 on the Oricon charts, breaking her entire previous album's record sales in one week. Can't Buy My Love managed to sell over 680,000 copies. Due to the success of Can't Buy My Love, Yui's previous album, From Me to You charted once again, adding another 9,000 copies to the Oricon counting.

=== I Loved Yesterday (2007–2008) ===
Yui released her 9th single "My Generation/Understand" on June 13, 2007. It was her first double A-side single. "My Generation" was selected as the ending theme for the TV drama Seito Shokun!, and "Understand" was chosen as the theme song for the movie Dog in a Sidecar (サイドカーに犬), (starring her senpai at Stardust Promotion, Yūko Takeuchi). The single charted at number 1 on the Oricon Weekly Charts the first week of its release.

Her tenth single, "Love & Truth" was released on September 26, 2007. The title track is the theme song to the film Closed Note (クローズド・ノート) (starring Erika Sawajiri, also of Stardust). During this time, her previous two albums were re-released as Winter Sleeve Editions in alternative covers taken from her "Love & Truth" photoshoot. Her first live concert DVD Thank You My Teens was released on November 14, 2007, which contained footage of her second live concert tour.

On November 19, 2007, Yui opened her first live show at Nippon Budokan, which promptly sold out. The Budokan concert was structured similar to a live performance, which a writer from B-Pass called it fitting considering her beginnings as a street performer on the streets of Fukuoka.

Yui began 2008 with her eleventh single, "Namidairo", released on February 27, 2008. Yui composed the song as a "mysterious and sad sounding" insert for the television drama 4 Shimai Tantei Dan. While writing the song, she attempted to convey a feeling of saying "I'm fine" in order to not worry one's lover, and how during such occasions, we realize little things we don't normally notice. The chorus of the song was incidentally written by Yui during her singing debut.

A week following the release of her 11th single, the promotional video of a new song "Laugh Away", was released. The song was used in Glico's "Watering KissMint" commercial. "Laugh Away" was released as a digital single on March 10, 2008.

Her third studio album was released on April 9, 2008, titled I Loved Yesterday. It quickly charted at number 1 on the Oricon Weekly Charts and sold more than 400,000 copies, behind her second album. The 10th track on the album, titled "Oh Yeah", was used as the opening theme to Mezamashi TV, a morning television show. The limited-edition version of the album included a DVD which contained music videos of her previous singles and live footage of her Nippon Budokan show. The album was composed mainly of semi-ballads with much of the same themes as her previous releases such as youth.

Yui's third tour, named "Oui: I Loved Yesterday'" started in May 2008 and ran until July.

=== My Short Stories/Holidays in the Sun (2008–2010) ===
On July 2, 2008, Yui released "Summer Song," again charting at number 1 on the Oricon Weekly Charts. "Summer Song" sold 83,440 copies in a week, making the single the singer's second highest in first week sales after "Love & Truth."

Yui released her B-side compilation album, My Short Stories, on November 12, 2008, which debuted at number 1 on Oricon. The album included all the B-side tracks of all her singles to date, along with a new song, "I'll Be." Yui is the second female artist whose B-side compilation album topped the charts, after Seiko Matsuda's Touch Me in 1984. The last compilation album that reached No. 1 was Mr. Children's B-Side in May 2007. On the success of "My Short Stories", sales of her first album From Me to You rose again.

In her "Yui Diary" blog entry on August 29, 2008, Yui mentioned that she would put her career on hold, not making any public appearances after the release of the album. She asserted that the break would allow her to fully concentrate on her plans for the next year. During this break, she co-wrote the song "I Do It" with Okinawa girl band Stereopony. It was released as Stereopony's third single on April 22, 2009.

Yui announced her return from her five-month hiatus on March 25, 2009, on her official website. The single celebrating her return was an up-tempo song titled "Again." The track was chosen as the first opening theme of the new season of the Fullmetal Alchemist: Brotherhood anime, premiering on April 5, 2009. The single was released on June 3, 2009. "Again" debuted atop the Oricon charts, selling over 110,000 copies in its first week. The single had the highest opening week sales for a female act in 2009.

Her website Yui-net.com announced the release of her second double-A side single named "It's All Too Much/Never Say Die" on July 27, 2009. The two songs were featured in the film adaptation of Kaiji as both a theme and an insert song. The single was released on October 7, 2009, and Kaiji released on October 10, 2009. The single debuted at number 1, selling 75,000 copies in its first week of sales, becoming her fifth number one single. On January 20, 2010, Yui released "Gloria", selling over 80,000 copies in the first week and again topping the Oricon charts. Her next single, "To Mother," was released on June 2, 2010, yet again topping the charts.

On July 14, 2010, Yui released her fourth studio album Holidays in the Sun, which included her five singles from "Summer Song" to "To Mother". It became her fourth straight album to top the Oricon charts, eventually selling over 300,000 copies and attaining the certification of Platinum.

=== How Crazy Your Love (2010–2013) ===
Her single "Rain" was released on the November 24, 2010. Yui's released a double-A side of "It's My Life/Your Heaven," on January 26, 2011. Yui traveled to Sweden for the shooting of the "Your Heaven" music video, also producing a short movie showing her journey to various places and shops in Sweden.

Yui's tour DVD, Holidays in the Sun was released on March 9. Her newest single, "Hello (Paradise Kiss)", was released on June 1, 2011, the A-side and B-side being the theme song and ending song, respectively, of the live-action movie "Paradise Kiss." On June 16, 2011, Yui traveled to Hong Kong for her first overseas concert at the AsiaWorld-Expo Arena, performing to a capacity audience of 14,000 people.

Yui visited schools in stricken areas from the 2011 Tōhoku earthquake and tsunami on July 7, 2011, and performed a charity concert. Her single "Green a.Live" uses the emotions and thoughts she felt from the visit, and was released on October 5, 2011. It was previewed on the Tokyo FM radio show School of Lock on August 22. "Green a.Live" debuted on top of the charts, and became her first number one single since "To Mother."

On November 2, 2011, Yui released her fifth and final album as a soloist, How Crazy Your Love. The album debuted at number one on the daily charts, selling just under 50,000 copies on the first day of release, and would go on to reach number one on the weekly charts – making How Crazy Your Love her fifth straight album to debut at the weekly number one. She started her fifth major tour on November 11, 2011, to promote her recent album with cruising as its principal thematic element.

Yui's upcoming single was announced through her participation in Ncon (Nコン), a national school music competition where schools compete to provide their best rendition of songs composed by select artists for a specific theme for that year. Yui was selected to compose for the middle school category. The song was eventually revealed as "fight" on R no Housoku (Rの法則), and was released on September 5, 2012.

In a video uploaded to Yui's official Vevo channel on December 18, 2012, she announced that she would be taking a break from music. She explained that "...Yui is so precious and special for me, so I want to leave it as is for a while." To her fans, she said, "Actually, part of the reason I'm going into hiatus again is for the sake of my fans. The biggest reason is that I don't want them to see me with a broken-off heart, if that happens."

=== Flower Flower and Other Collaboration (2013–present) ===
Yui returned from hiatus shortly thereafter with a new band called Flower Flower, which performed incognito throughout Japan. The band has since released four digital and Japan-only singles; "Tsuki (月)," "Kamisama (神様)," "Natsu/Aki (夏/秋)" and "Subarashii Sekai (素晴らしい世界)". On March 27, 2014, Yui revealed in her band blog that she had been diagnosed with a panic disorder, which resulted in the cancellation of some presentations. The band, however, would release its first studio album Mi (実) on November 26, 2014. The album would go on to debut at number 5 on the weekly Oricon, charting for 11 weeks.

Flower Flower released the band's first physical single, "Takaramono (宝物)," on September 9, 2016, which debuted at number ten and charted for five weeks. While talking about the release of the single, almost a year and a half after her previous project, Yui would state: "I did not think I could release songs again, and to be honest I am quite happy that I can."

In the summer of 2017, Flower Flower appeared in various festivals, including at Rock in Japan Festival 2017 and Summer Sonic 2017, leading to speculation that the band would release a second physical single. In a series of concerts in Osaka and Tokyo, the group announced that they would release "Mannequin (マネキン)" on August 2, 2017. In an interview released on the band's website, Yui would state that despite the song's initial composition as a "summer" pop rock song, reflected in the pop-like promotion material, during pre-production and recording the song eventually gravitated towards hard rock. When comparing the single with its B-side, "Drama (ドラマ)," Yui believed that placing a strong, western-like arranged single in "Mannequin" in juxtaposition with the more graceful song "Drama" would provide a nice balance.

Flower Flower released the band's second studio album, "Spotlight (スポットライト)," on March 14, 2018. Spotlight was released two and a half years after Flower Flower's previous album, Mi, but included songs that were produced and played live during Flower Flower's early live performances.

== Personal life ==
On April 17, 2015, the singer announced via the official blog of her band Flower Flower that she had married a man outside of the industry and that she was pregnant. In August 2015, it was announced that Yui had given birth to healthy identical twin boys.

On November 11, 2017, Yui confirmed reports from the media that the singer had divorced her husband at the end of August 2017. She has custody of the twin boys they had together.

In September 2018, it was reported that Yui had gotten remarried to a non-celebrity man after dating for nine months. She shared that he works as a personal trainer at a sports gym and that he has been very supportive of her and her music career. She also revealed that she was five months pregnant. She later gave birth to her third child, a son, though the specific date of birth was undisclosed. Yui then gave birth to the couple's fourth child, a daughter, in February 2019. Due to the birth of her fourth child, her band suspended live performances until July 2019.

== Discography ==
Studio albums as soloist

- From Me to You (2006)
- Can't Buy My Love (2007)
- I Loved Yesterday (2008)
- Holidays in the Sun (2010)
- How Crazy Your Love (2011)

Studio albums as Flower Flower

- Mi (実; lit. Fruit) (2014)
- Spotlight (スポットライト, 2018)
- Target (ターゲット, 2020)

Compilation albums

- My Short Stories (2008)
- Green Garden Pop (2012)
- Orange Garden Pop (2012)

== Filmography ==
=== DVDs ===
- 2007: Thank You My Teens
- 2011: Yui 4th Tour 2010: Hotel Holidays in the Sun
- 2012: Yui 5th Tour 2012 Cruising: How Crazy Your Love

=== Films and TV ===
Year	Title	Role
2006	Song of the Sun	Kaoru Amane (Lead)
2011	Kaitō Royale	Cameo

== Live performances ==
=== Tours ===
- Yui First Tour 2006 "7 Street": Live Life Love (March 21 – April 18, 2006)
- Yui Second Tour 2007 "Spring & Jump": Can't Buy My Love (April 13 – June 1, 2007)
- Yui Third Tour 2008 "Oui": I Loved Yesterday (May 5 – July 19, 2008)
- Yui Fourth Tour 2010: Hotel Holidays in the Sun (September 12 – November 2, 2010)
- Yui Fifth Tour 2011: "Cruising": How Crazy Your Love (November 11, 2011 – January 25, 2012)

=== Single-day performances ===
- Yui Live 2007 at Nippon Budokan (November 19, 2007)
- Yui Live 2011: Hong Kong Hotel Holidays in the Sun (June 26, 2011)

=== Cover performances ===
- YUI × Bianconero - Goodbye to You (Our Music, April 8, 2005)
- YUI × Suga Shikao - Yozora no Mukou (Our Music, August 12, 2005)
- YUI - M (Our Music, June 23, 2006)
- YUI × Bianconero - Yasashisa ni Tsutsumareta Nara (Our Music, July 7, 2006)
- YUI - Friends (Our Music, September 28, 2007)
- YUI × Hideaki Tokunaga - Sotsugyou Shashin (Our Music, October 19, 2007)
- YUI × BO GUMBO3 - Yume no Naka (Our Music, July 16, 2010)
- YUI × Kazuyoshi Saito - Zutto Suki Datta (Our Music, November 4, 2011)
- YUI - Tsubasa wo Kudasai (Music Lovers, April 2012)

== Awards and nominations ==
Year	Nominated work	Award	Result
2007	Herself	20th Japan Gold Disc Awards: Artist of the Year	Nominated
2007	Herself	30th Japan Academy Prize: Rookie of Year	Won
2007	Good-bye Days	MTV Video Music Awards Japan: Best Video From a Film (from Midnight Sun)	Nominated
2008	Herself	MTV Student Voice Award 2008: Best Artist	Won
2008	Love & Truth	MTV Video Music Awards Japan: Best Pop Video	Nominated
2008	Love & Truth	MTV Video Music Awards Japan: Best Video From a Film (from Closed Note)	Nominated
2008	My Generation	Space Shower Music Video Awards 08: Best Pop Video	Won
2010	Gloria	1st Brazil's J-Station Music Awards: Hit of The Year	Won
2011	Rain	MTV Video Music Awards Japan: Best Female Video	Nominated
2011	Holidays in the Sun	MTV Video Music Awards Japan: Best Album of the Year	Nominated
