= It's All Too Much/Never Say Die =

""It's All Too Much"/"Never Say Die""
- CD Normal Edition Cover

Single by Yui

from the album Holidays in the Sun
- Released: October 7, 2009
- Genre: J-pop
- Label: Sony Music Japan
- Songwriter(s): Yui (lyrics & music)

Yui singles chronology
| "Again" (2009) | "It's All Too Much" / "Never Say Die" (2009) | "Gloria" (2010) |

"It's All Too Much"/"Never Say Die" is the fourteenth single by Japanese pop singer-songwriter Yui. The single was released on October 7, 2009. The two songs were used for the first live-action film adaptation of the manga series Kaiji, as theme song and insert song, respectively. "It's All Too Much"/"Never Say Die" debuted at number one in the first week sales with sales of 75,047 copies and is Yui's 5th overall number one single on the Japanese Oricon charts. The single is certified Gold by the Recording Industry Association of Japan (RIAJ) for shipment of 100,000 copies.

== Track listing ==
Normal Edition

All tracks are written by Yui

CD
| No. | Title | Arranger(s) | Length |
|---|---|---|---|
| 1. | "It's All Too Much" | Hisashi Kondo | 4:13 |
| 2. | "Never Say Die" | e.u.Band & Hisashi Kondo | 2:42 |
| 3. | "Again ~Yui Acoustic Version~" | Yui & Hisashi Kondo | 4:16 |
| 4. | "It's All Too Much ~Instrumental~" | Hisashi Kondo | 4:13 |

Limited Edition

Normal Edition + DVD

DVD
| No. | Title | Length |
|---|---|---|
| 1. | "It's All Too Much" (Music Video) |
| 2. | "Never Say Die" (Music Video) |
