= Hello (Paradise Kiss) =

- CD Normal Edition Cover

Single by Yui

from the album How Crazy Your Love
- A-side: "Hello: Paradise Kiss"
- B-side: You; It's My Life: Yui Acoustic Version
- Released: June 1, 2011
- Recorded: 2011
- Genre: J-pop
- Length: 14:30
- Label: Gr8! Records
- Songwriter: Yui

Yui singles chronology
"It's My Life/Your Heaven" (2010)	"Hello (Paradise Kiss)" (2011)	"Green a.Live" (2011)

"Hello (Paradise Kiss)" is the nineteenth single by Japanese pop singer-songwriter Yui. It was released on June 1, 2011.

== Background and writing ==
The single was written and composed by YUI. She said that she attempted to make the song sound pop-like, while trying to add a slight pizzicato which she picked up from the atmosphere of Paradise Kiss. She also said the song was one of deciding to prepare oneself, while finding answers as you mature.

== Promotion and tie-ins ==
The A-Side "Hello (Paradise Kiss)" was composed to be the theme song of the live action movie Paradise Kiss based on the popular manga created by Ai Yazawa. The B-Side "You" was composed to be the ending song of the same movie. The first press editions came with original illustrations by Ai Yazawa and postcards were also included for some customers in Japan.

== Music video ==
The music video depicts Yui in a variety of clothes while strumming a guitar.

== Track list ==
All tracks are written by Yui.

CD
No.	Title	Arranger	Length
1.	"Hello (Paradise Kiss)"	Hisashi Kondo	3:38
2.	"You"	Hisashi Kondo	3:56
3.	"It's My Life ~Yui Acoustic Version~"	Yui & Hisashi Kondo	3:19
4.	"Hello (Paradise Kiss) ~Instrumental~"	Hisashi Kondo	3:36

DVD
No.	Title	Director	Length
1.	"It's My Life (MV)"	Shigeaki Kubo	3:38

== Sales Charts (Japan) ==
Chart (2010)	Peak position	First week sales	Sales total
Japan Oricon Weekly Single	3	69,838	97,274
Japan Billboard Hot 100 Singles	3	69,838	97,274

The single was certified gold by the Recording Industry Association of Japan (RIAJ) for having shipped more than 100,000 copies to stores.
