= I Remember You (Yui song) =

Single by Yui

from the album Can't Buy My Love
- Released: September 20, 2006
- Genre: J-pop
- Label: Sony Records
- Songwriter(s): Yui (lyrics & music)
- Producer(s): Hisashi Kondo

Yui singles chronology
"Good-bye Days" (2006)	"I Remember You" (2006)	"Rolling Star" (2007)

"I Remember You" is the sixth single by the Japanese artist Yui. It was released on September 20, 2006, under Sony Records. This single is Yui's first single that has two editions.

== Track listing ==
Normal Edition

All tracks are written by Yui.

CD
No.	Title	Arranger(s)	Length
1.	"I Remember You"	northa+
2.	"Cloudy"	northa+
3.	"Good-bye Days ~Yui Acoustic Version~"	Yui & northa+
4.	"I Remember You ~Instrumental~"	northa+

Limited Edition

Normal Edition + DVD

DVD
No.	Title	Length
1.	"I Remember You" (Music Video)

== Oricon sales chart (Japan) ==
Release	Chart	Peak position	Sales total
September 20, 2006	Oricon Daily Singles Chart	1	65,241
September 20, 2006	Oricon Weekly Singles Chart	2	65,241

== Music video (PV) ==
The music video/promotion video for "I Remember You" features settings from Yui's first movie, "Taiyou no Uta" where her previous single, "Good-bye Days" was featured.
