= To Mother (Yui song) =

Single by Yui

from the album Holidays in the Sun
- A-side: "To Mother"
- B-side: "Tonight"
- Released: June 2, 2010
- Genre: J-pop
- Label: Gr8! Records
- Songwriter(s): Yui (lyrics & music)
- Producer(s): Hisashi Kondo

Yui singles chronology
"Gloria" (2010)	"To Mother" (2010)	"Rain" (2010)

"To Mother" is the sixteenth single by Japanese pop singer-songwriter Yui. It was released on June 2, 2010 by Gr8! Records. The single debuted atop the Oricon Weekly Single Chart, becoming her seventh number-one single. It was the first song in which Yui replaced guitar for piano.

== Background and writing ==
Although it is Yui's first song in which she exchanges her guitar for a piano, it was first written using a guitar. When asked about the decision in writing the song, unsurprisingly, was in support of mothers of the world. She also added that although she frequently wrote upbeat songs and melodies on encouraging people, for this song she wanted to look around her own life and see who was important to her. Yui also talked specifically about the lyric, "kindness is so cruel, isn’t it?", (Note: Original text: "やさしさって 残酷よね？") inferring that when someone gets hurt, loved ones feel the pain as well. She also talked about the variety of perspective present in the song, through lyrics such as "isn't hatred just a misunderstanding" (Note: Original text: "憎しみって ささいなすれ違いでしょ？") or "kindness is a thing [that] if snuggled together, a comforting thing". (Note: Original text: "悲しみって 寄り添えば何処となく 温かくて")

== Music video ==
The video primarily shows Yui playing a piano, with occasional focuses on her band. This is her first video in which her entire supporting band was non-Japanese. Chris, the drummer, would go on to play with Yui in a variety of live performances such as Rock in Japan Festival or providing drumming tracks to songs, including "I do it" and "Hello (Paradise Kiss)".

== Track listing ==
=== Normal Edition ===
All tracks are written by Yui

CD
No.	Title	Arranger(s)	Length
1.	"To Mother"	Hisashi Kondo	3:50
2.	"Tonight"	Odakura	2:36
3.	"Gloria ~Yui Acoustic Version~"	Yui & Hisashi Kondo	3:41
4.	"To Mother ~Instrumental~"	Hisashi Kondo	3:50

=== Limited Edition ===
(Normal Edition + DVD)

DVD
No.	Title	Director	Length
1.	"To Mother"	Shigeaki Kubo	4:18

== Oricon sales chart (Japan) ==
Chart (2010)	Peak position
Japan Oricon Weekly Single	1
