= Love & Truth =

Single by Yui

from the album I Loved Yesterday
- Released: 29 September 2007
- Genre: J-pop
- Label: Sony Music Japan
- Songwriters: Yui (lyrics & music)
- Producer: Hisashi Kondo

Yui singles chronology
"My Generation/Understand" (2007)	"Love & Truth" (2007)	"Namidairo" (2008)

"Love & Truth" is the tenth single by the Japanese artist Yui. The title song, "Love & Truth", was used for the Japanese movie Closed Note starring Erika Sawajiri, who played Yui's counterpart role in the TV drama version of Taiyō no Uta. The music video was directed by Takahiro Miki.

== Track listing ==
Normal Edition

All tracks are written by Yui.

CD
No.	Title	Arranger(s)	Length
1.	"Love & Truth"	northa+	4:21
2.	"Jam"	SHIGEZO	3:06
3.	"My Generation ~Yui Acoustic Version~"	Yui & northa+	3:55
4.	"Love & Truth ~Instrumental~"	northa+	4:21

Limited Edition

Normal Edition + DVD

DVD
No.	Title	Length
1.	"Love & Truth ~Movie Version~" (Music Video)

== Oricon sales chart (Japan) ==
Release	Chart	Peak position	First week sales	Sales total	Chart run
29 September 2007	Oricon Daily Singles Chart	1			
29 September 2007	Oricon Weekly Singles Chart	1	87,491	144,651	9 weeks
29 September 2007	Oricon Monthly Singles Chart	4			
29 September 2007	Oricon Yearly Singles Chart	51			
