= Cherry (Yui song) =

Single by Yui

from the album Can't Buy My Love
- Released: March 7, 2007
- Genre: J-pop
- Label: Sony Music Japan
- Songwriters: Yui (lyrics & music)
- Producer: Hisashi Kondo

Yui singles chronology
"Rolling Star" (2007)	"Cherry" (2007)	"My Generation/Understand" (2007)

"Cherry" (parsed as CHE.R.RY) is the eighth single of singer/songwriter Yui released March 7, 2007. It broke her personal record for highest first week sales, exceeding the 75,390 copies sold during the first week of sales for Rolling Star.

This song also overtook Hikaru Utada's Flavor of Life for number one on Chaku-Uta downloads, but Flavor of Life beat it to number one the next day. Its PV has peaked at number two for downloads.

The lead A-side, Cherry, was used as a song for the KDDI au Listen Mobile Service CM.

The music video was directed by Takahiro Miki.

The song was used as ending theme for the 15th episode of the anime ReLIFE, as well as its appearance in the 2021 Netflix film Ride or Die. It was also used as the ending theme for the 8th episode of the anime Alya Sometimes Hides Her Feelings in Russian, covered by Sumire Uesaka as the titular Alya.

== Track listing ==
All tracks are written by Yui.

No.	Title	Arranger(s)	Length
1.	"CHE.R.RY"	northa+	3:34
2.	"Driving Today"	northa+	3:08
3.	"Rolling Star ~Yui Acoustic Version~"	Yui/northa+	3:08
4.	"CHE.R.RY ~Instrumental~"	northa+	3:34

Limited edition bonus DVD
No.	Title	Length
1.	"CHE.R.RY (Lismo version)" (music video)

== Charts ==
=== Oricon sales chart (Japan) ===
Release	Chart	Peak position	Sales total	Chart run
March 7, 2007	Oricon Daily Singles Chart	2		
March 7, 2007	Oricon Weekly Singles Chart	2	168,964	19
March 7, 2007	Oricon Monthly Singles Chart	5		
March 7, 2007	Oricon Yearly Singles Chart	36		

== Certifications ==
Region	Certification	Certified units/sales
Streaming
Japan (RIAJ)	Platinum	100,000,000^{†}
^{†} Streaming-only figures based on certification alone.
