= Again (Yui song) =

- CD Normal Edition Cover

Single by Yui

from the album Holidays in the Sun
- A-side: "Again"
- B-side: "Sea"; "Summer Song: Yui Acoustic Version"
- Released: June 3, 2009
- Genre: Rock
- Label: Studioseven Recordings
- Songwriter: Yui
- Producer: Hisashi Kondo

Yui singles chronology
"Summer Song" (2008)	"Again" (2009)	"It's All Too Much/Never Say Die" (2009)

"Again" (stylized in all lowercase) is Japanese pop rock singer-songwriter Yui's thirteenth single, and first single after she went on hiatus in November 2008. "Again" was released on June 3, 2009, by her label Studioseven Recordings and was released in two formats: CD and CD+DVD.

The single debuted atop the Oricon Weekly Single Chart becoming her fourth number-one single. The single has the highest opening week sales for a female act in 2009, which was previously held by pop singer Ayumi Hamasaki's "Rule/Sparkle" for selling 95,000 copies in its first week.

== Background ==
On March 25, 2009, Yui announced on her official website that she was ending her hiatus and returning to the music scene. On her website she also announced that she had worked on a new single, "Again". It was later revealed that "Again" was going to be used as the first opening theme song for the Fullmetal Alchemist: Brotherhood anime series.

== Track listing ==
Normal Edition

All tracks are written by Yui.

CD
No.	Title	Arranger(s)	Length
1.	"Again"	Hisashi Kondo	4:19
2.	"Sea"	e.u.Band & Hisashi Kondo	3:37
3.	"Summer Song ~Yui Acoustic Version~"	Yui + northa+	3:32
4.	"Again ~Instrumental~"		4:14

Limited Edition

Normal Edition + DVD

DVD
No.	Title	Length
1.	"Again" (Music Video)
2.	"I'll Be" (Special School Live Video)

== Charts and certifications ==
=== Charts ===
Chart (2009)	Peak position
Japan Oricon Weekly Single	1
Japan Billboard Hot 100 Singles	1
Taiwan G-Music J-Pop	2

=== Sales and certifications ===
Country	Provider	Sales	Certification
Japan	RIAJ	163,634	Gold
