= Gloria (Yui song) =

- CD Normal Edition Cover

Single by Yui

from the album Holidays in the Sun
- A-side: "Gloria"
- B-side: "Muffler"; "It's all too much: Yui Acoustic Version"
- Released: January 20, 2010
- Genre: Rock
- Label: Studioseven Recordings
- Songwriter: Yui

Yui singles chronology
"It's all too much/Never say die" (2009)	"Gloria" (2010)	"To Mother" (2010)

"Gloria" is Japanese pop rock singer-songwriter Yui's fifteenth single. "Gloria" was released on January 20, 2010, by her label Studioseven Recordings and was released in two formats: CD and CD+DVD. The single debuted atop the Oricon Weekly Single Chart becoming her sixth number-one single.

== Track listing ==
Normal Edition

All tracks are written by Yui.

CD
No.	Title	Arranger(s)	Length
1.	"Gloria"	Hisashi Kondo	3:41
2.	"Muffler"	northa+	4:06
3.	"It's all too much ~Yui Acoustic Version~"	Yui & Hisashi Kondo	4:09
4.	"Gloria ~Instrumental~"	Hisashi Kondo	3:41

Limited Edition

Normal Edition + DVD

DVD
No.	Title	Length
1.	"Gloria" (Music Video)

== Chart performance ==
"Gloria" debuted at number-one on the Oricon weekly chart and became the artist's sixth number-one single.

=== Charts ===
Chart (2010)	Peak position
Billboard yearly Japan Hot 100	45
Japan Oricon Weekly Single	1
RIAJ Digital Track Chart yearly top 100	52

=== Sales and certifications ===
Country	Provider	Sales	Certification
Japan	RIAJ	113,100	Gold
