= Tomorrow's Way =

Single by Yui

from the album From Me to You
- Released: June 22, 2005
- Genre: J-pop
- Label: Sony Records
- Songwriters: Yui (lyrics & music)
- Producer: Yoshio Konno

Yui singles chronology
"Feel My Soul" (2005)	"Tomorrow's Way" (2005)	"Life" (2005)

"Tomorrow's Way" is the second single by the Japanese artist Yui. It was released June 22, 2005, under Sony Records. The song was also featured as the ending theme in the Japanese movie Hinokio. The boy who appears in the song's music video is Kanata Hongō, who also stars in the movie. The music video was directed by Takahiro Miki.

Hong Kong singer and actress Fiona Sit covered this song as "Dear Fiona", a Cantonese version.

== Track listing ==
All tracks are written by Yui.

CD
No.	Title	Arranger(s)	Length
1.	"Tomorrow’s Way"	hideyuki DAICHI suzuki	4:45
2.	"Last Train"	hideyuki DAICHI suzuki	4:43
3.	"Feel My Soul ~Yui Acoustic Version~"	Yui & hideyuki DAICHI suzuki	3:55
4.	"Tomorrow’s Way ~Instrumental~"	hideyuki DAICHI suzuki	4:45

== Oricon Sales Chart (Japan) ==
Release	Chart	Peak position	Sales total
June 22, 2005	Oricon Daily Singles Chart	15	32,391
