= Good-bye Days =

Single by Yui

from the album Can't Buy My Love
- Released: 14 June 2006
- Genre: J-pop
- Label: Sony Music Japan
- Songwriter(s): Yui (lyrics & music)
- Producer(s): Hisashi Kondo

Yui singles chronology
"Tokyo" (2006)	"Good-bye Days" (2006)	"I Remember You" (2006)

"Good-bye Days" (stylized as "Good-bye days") is a 2006 song by Japanese singer Yui, credited as Yui for Kaoru Amane. The song was released as Yui's fifth single on 14 June 2006 under Sony Records. The song served as the theme song to the 2006 film A Song to the Sun, in which Yui also starred as Kaoru Amane. The single's B-side, "Skyline", was also featured in the film as an insert song. "It's Happy Line" is actually the title track of her first single, which was an indie release.

== Track listing ==
All tracks are written by Yui

CD
No.	Title	Arranger(s)	Length
1.	"Good-bye Days"	Akihisa Matsuura
2.	"Skyline"	Akihisa Matsuura
3.	"It's Happy Line"	Hideyuki Daichi Suzuki
4.	"Good-bye Days (Instrumental)"	Akihisa Matsuura

== Oricon Sales Chart (Japan) ==
Release	Chart	Peak position	Sales total	Chart run
June 14, 2006	Oricon Daily Singles Chart	1		
June 14, 2006	Oricon Weekly Singles Chart	3	226,155	44
June 14, 2006	Oricon Yearly Singles Chart	36		
