= Taking Chances World Tour: The Concert =

Video and live album by Celine Dion
- Released: 29 April 2010
- Recorded: August–September 2008
- Venue: TD Garden (Boston); Bell Centre (Montreal)
- Genre: Pop
- Length: 101:53 (English DVD); 93:00 (French DVD); 77:36 (English CD); 77:41 (French CD)
- Language: English; French
- Label: Columbia
- Director: Jean Lamoureux
- Producer: Julie Snyder

Celine Dion chronology
Celine: Through the Eyes of the World (2010)	Taking Chances World Tour: The Concert (2010)	Céline une seule fois / Live 2013 (2014)

Celine Dion albums chronology
My Love: Essential Collection (2008)	Taking Chances World Tour: The Concert (2010)	The Best of Celine Dion & David Foster (2012)

Taking Chances World Tour: The Concert is a home video and live album by Canadian singer Celine Dion. It was released by Columbia Records on 29 April 2010 in Australia, and in early May 2010 in Europe and North America. The concert was issued as a DVD/CD combo in two editions: the English-language Taking Chances World Tour: The Concert and the French-language Tournée mondiale Taking Chances: le spectacle. Dion embarked on the 2008–2009 Taking Chances World Tour to promote her 2007 studio album Taking Chances. The tour became one of the highest-grossing concert tours of all time. Performances in Boston and Montreal during the North American leg were filmed for the video release, directed by Jean Lamoureux.

The release received positive reviews from music critics, who praised Dion's stage presence, her vocal performances, and the selection of songs. It was also commercially successful. In Canada, Tournée mondiale Taking Chances: le spectacle was certified diamond, while Taking Chances World Tour: The Concert was certified four-times platinum. The DVD was also certified platinum in the United States, and the album received gold certification in France. It topped the DVD charts in the United States and several European countries, and reached the top 10 in many others. In some territories, the video release entered the album charts, peaking inside the top 10 in a few of them, including number five in France.

== Background ==
During the Taking Chances World Tour, Dion performed concerts on five continents, in 25 countries, and in 93 cities, selling more than three million tickets. Running from February 2008 through February 2009, with both Anglophone and Francophone setlists, the tour broke attendance and box office records at venues around the world. It was recorded in Boston and Montreal in 2008 and, in April 2010, Dion's official website announced that Taking Chances World Tour: The Concert, a DVD/CD of live performances, would be released on 4 May 2010 in Canada, and on 11 May 2010 in the United States. This concert release coincided with the DVD and Blu-ray edition of Celine: Through the Eyes of the World, issued on the same date.

== Content ==
The concert was released as a DVD/CD combo in both English (Taking Chances World Tour: The Concert) and French (Tournée mondiale Taking Chances: le spectacle). It was recorded at the TD Garden in Boston on 12 and 13 August 2008, and at the Bell Centre in Montreal on 31 August and 1 September 2008. For songs performed in both the English and French concerts, the vocals and footage are the same on both DVDs (with the exception of "Pour que tu m'aimes encore," "My Love", and part of "My Heart Will Go On"), presented as a mix of the Boston and Montreal performances. However, the two DVDs differ, as each includes songs that appeared only in the English-language or French-language setlists.

Surrounded by musicians and dancers, Dion performed her biggest hits and songs from her album Taking Chances (2007). From the energetic opening track "I Drove All Night" to the encore finale "My Heart Will Go On", the concert includes more than 100 minutes of performances of over 20 songs. It also includes cover versions of Queen's "We Will Rock You" and "The Show Must Go On", and James Brown's "It's a Man's Man's Man's World". Although performed in Boston, "I'm Your Angel" was omitted from the English DVD/CD. The same occurred with "The Power of Love" on the French DVD.

A limited edition two-DVD deluxe set containing both Celine: Through the Eyes of the World and Taking Chances World Tour: The Concert, along with a 52-page booklet and fold-out souvenir postcards, was released in mid-May 2010. QVC also offered Celine: Through the Eyes of the World with a bonus CD that included tracks not featured on the Taking Chances World Tour: The Concert CD: "I'm Alive", "Fade Away", "Pour que tu m'aimes encore", "We Will Rock You", and "The Show Must Go On".

== Critical reception ==
Professional ratings
Review scores
Source	Rating
AllMusic	3/5 stars
Billboard Brasil	positive
Daily Herald	positive
Pink Paper	4/5 stars
Sunday Mercury	positive

Critical reception of Taking Chances World Tour: The Concert was generally positive. The Pink Paper awarded the album 4 out of 5 stars, writing that "Taking Chances is Celine at her most dynamic". The review praised the medleys spanning two decades of material, as well as the inclusion of unexpected cover versions. It also noted the energy present throughout the performance and complimented Dion's appearance on the DVD.

Paul Cole of the Sunday Mercury also reviewed the release positively, describing it as "predictable" yet "polished", praising the strong vocals, selected covers, and production values. He concluded that "love her or loathe her, it'll sell loads".

The Daily Herald described the concert as a strong display of Dion's global performances, noting her vocals, orchestral backing, and use of modern technology. Stephen Thomas Erlewine of AllMusic gave the album 3 out of 5 stars, stating that Dion "gives the people what they want via a recitation of the expected hits in arrangements so splashy they sparkle even without the visuals". He added that the album is aimed squarely at fans, who "will be pleased".

== Commercial performance ==
In Canada, Dion's new DVD releases debuted in the top three on the Nielsen SoundScan Music Video Chart. Celine: Through the Eyes of the World entered at number one with sales of 69,000 copies. Sales of this DVD marked the second highest one‑week total for a music DVD, behind Dion's own Live in Las Vegas: A New Day... (2007). Tournée mondiale Taking Chances: le spectacle entered at number two with 31,000 units sold, followed by Taking Chances World Tour: The Concert at number three with 8,000 copies sold. This was only the second time since 2004, after Hilary Duff, that an artist held the top three positions on the Canadian Music Video Chart. In the same week, the number‑one album on the Canadian Albums Chart sold 7,100 units. This meant that Tournée mondiale Taking Chances: le spectacle would have ranked number one on the Canadian Albums Chart if eligible, and Taking Chances World Tour: The Concert would have placed at number two. With over 100,000 copies of all three DVDs sold in one week, Dion set an all‑time record for music DVD sales in Canada. On 21 May 2010, CRIA certified all three releases: Celine: Through the Eyes of the World received a double diamond award for 200,000 copies sold, Tournée mondiale Taking Chances: le spectacle was certified diamond for 100,000 units, and Taking Chances World Tour: The Concert earned four‑times platinum for 40,000 copies sold.

In the United States, Dion entered the Billboard Top Music Video Sales chart at numbers one and two with Taking Chances World Tour: The Concert and Celine: Through the Eyes of the World, respectively. She became the first artist other than Bill and Gloria Gaither and the Gaither Vocal Band to debut in the chart's top two positions simultaneously. Taking Chances World Tour: The Concert sold 26,000 copies in its first week and would have ranked number 14 on the Billboard 200 if DVDs were eligible. Celine: Through the Eyes of the World sold 15,000 copies in its debut week. On 16 July 2010, the RIAA certified Taking Chances World Tour: The Concert platinum for 100,000 units shipped and Celine: Through the Eyes of the World gold for 50,000 units. On the Billboard 2010 Year‑End Top Music Video Sales chart, Taking Chances World Tour: The Concert ranked number 10 and Celine: Through the Eyes of the World ranked number 19. According to Nielsen SoundScan, Taking Chances World Tour: The Concert sold 76,000 copies in 2010, while Celine: Through the Eyes of the World ended the year with 50,000 units sold. As of August 2012, Taking Chances World Tour: The Concert had sold 95,000 copies in the United States.

Due to differing chart rules, the DVD/CD combo of Taking Chances World Tour: The Concert entered DVD charts in some countries and album charts in others. Beyond its strong debut in Canada and the United States, it reached number one on the DVD charts in Ireland, Switzerland, and Japan (international chart), number two in Finland, number three in Germany and Austria, number four in Australia and Sweden, and number six in Spain. On album charts, it peaked at number one in Greece (international chart), number two in Argentina and South Korea (international chart), number 11 in the United Kingdom and the Netherlands, number 18 in New Zealand, number 24 in Portugal, number 29 in Italy and the Czech Republic, and number 30 in Mexico. In addition to Canada, the French edition titled Tournée mondiale Taking Chances: le spectacle was released in France and Belgium. It reached number five on the French Albums Chart and was certified gold in July 2010 for 50,000 copies sold. It also charted in Belgium's Wallonia (peaking at number three) and Flanders (reaching number 30). On the European Top 100 Albums, Taking Chances World Tour: The Concert peaked at number 30, and Tournée mondiale Taking Chances: le spectacle reached number 39.

== Accolades ==
The French-language edition of the DVD/CD, titled Tournée mondiale Taking Chances: le spectacle, was nominated for a 2011 Juno Award in the Music DVD of the Year category, but lost to Rush's Rush: Beyond the Lighted Stage.

== Track listing ==
English DVD
No.	Title	Writer(s)	Length
1.	"I Drove All Night"	Billy Steinberg; Tom Kelly	8:55
2.	"The Power of Love"	Gunther Mende; Candy DeRouge; Jennifer Rush; Mary Susan Applegate	4:02
3.	"Taking Chances"	Kara DioGuardi; David A. Stewart	4:07
4.	"Hits Medley: "It's All Coming Back to Me Now" / "Because You Loved Me" / "To Love You More"	Jim Steinman; Diane Warren; David Foster; Junior Miles	10:05
5.	"Eyes on Me"	Kristian Lundin; Savan Kotecha; Delta Goodrem	7:10
6.	"All by Myself"	Eric Carmen; Sergei Rachmaninoff	5:25
7.	"I'm Alive"	Lundin; Andreas Carlsson	5:28
8.	"Shadow of Love"	Anders Bagge; Aldo Nova; Peter Sjöström	3:02
9.	"Fade Away"	Peer Åström; David Stenmarck; Nova	3:00
10.	"Alone"	Steinberg; David Stenmarck; Kelly	3:43
11.	"My Love"	Linda Perry	8:07
12.	"The Prayer" (with Andrea Bocelli)	Carole Bayer Sager; Foster; Alberto Testa; Tony Renis	5:16
13.	"Pour que tu m'aimes encore"	Jean-Jacques Goldman	5:03
14.	"Tribute to Queen Medley: "We Will Rock You" / "The Show Must Go On"	Brian May	5:43
15.	"Soul Medley: "Sex Machine" / "Soul Man" / "Lady Marmalade" / "Sir Duke" / "Respect" / "I Got the Feelin'" / "I Got You (I Feel Good)" / "It's a Man's Man's Man's World"	James Brown; Bobby Byrd; Ron Lenhoff; Isaac Hayes; David Porter; Kenny Nolan; Bob Crewe; Stevie Wonder; Otis Redding; Betty Jean Newsome	6:23
16.	"Love Can Move Mountains"	Warren	4:38
17.	"River Deep, Mountain High"	Ellie Greenwich; Jeff Barry; Phil Spector	5:00
18.	"My Heart Will Go On"	James Horner; Will Jennings	6:46
Total length:			101:53

French DVD
No.	Title	Writer(s)	Length
1.	"I Drove All Night"	Steinberg; Kelly	6:46
2.	"J'irai où tu iras" (with Marc Langis)	Goldman	3:20
3.	"Destin"	Goldman	4:06
4.	"Taking Chances"	DioGuardi; Stewart	3:57
5.	"Et s'il n'en restait qu'une (je serais celle-là)"	Françoise Dorin; David Gategno	2:50
6.	"Eyes on Me"	Lundin; Kotecha; Goodrem	7:10
7.	"L'amour existe encore"	Luc Plamondon; Riccardo Cocciante	4:22
8.	"Dans un autre monde"	Goldman	3:59
9.	"All by Myself"	Carmen; Rachmaninoff	4:40
10.	"I'm Alive"	Lundin; Carlsson	2:49
11.	"Je sais pas"	Goldman; J. Kapler	4:19
12.	"My Love"	Perry	7:26
13.	"S'il suffisait d'aimer"	Goldman	4:08
14.	"Alone"	Steinberg; Steinberg	3:19
15.	"Medley hommage à Queen: "We Will Rock You" / "The Show Must Go On"	May	5:21
16.	"Medley soul: "Sex Machine" / "Soul Man" / "Lady Marmalade" / "Sir Duke" / "Respect" / "I Got the Feelin'" / "I Got You (I Feel Good)" / "It's a Man's Man's Man's World"	Brown; Byrd; Lenhoff; Hayes; Porter; Nolan; Crewe; Wonder; Redding; Newsome	6:29
17.	"Love Can Move Mountains"	Warren	3:57
18.	"River Deep, Mountain High"	Greenwich; Barry; Spector	4:17
19.	"My Heart Will Go On"	Horner; Jennings	5:35
20.	"Pour que tu m'aimes encore"	Goldman	4:10
Total length:			93:00

=== Notes ===
- The English CD excludes "I'm Alive", "Fade Away", "Pour que tu m'aimes encore", "We Will Rock You", and "The Show Must Go On".
- The French CD excludes "Eyes on Me", "I'm Alive", "We Will Rock You", and "The Show Must Go On".

== Weekly charts ==
=== Weekly video charts ===
Weekly video chart performance
Chart (2010–2016)	Peak position
Australian Music DVD (ARIA)	4
Austrian Music DVD (Ö3 Austria)	3
Canadian Music DVD (SoundScan) French edition	2
Canadian Music DVD (SoundScan) English edition	3
Finnish Music DVD (Suomen virallinen lista)	2
French Music DVD (SNEP)	1
German Music DVD (Media Control)	3
Irish Music DVD (IRMA)	1
Japanese Music DVD (Oricon)	16
Japanese International Music DVD (Oricon)	1
Spanish Music DVD (Promusicae)	6
Swedish Music DVD (Sverigetopplistan)	4
Swiss Music DVD (Schweizer Hitparade)	1
US Music Video Sales (Billboard)	1

=== Weekly album charts ===
Weekly album chart performance
Chart (2010)	Peak position
Argentine Albums (CAPIF)	2
Belgian Albums (Ultratop Flanders)	30
Belgian Albums (Ultratop Wallonia)	3
Czech Albums (ČNS IFPI)	29
Dutch Albums (Album Top 100)	11
European Albums (Music & Media) English edition	30
European Albums (Music & Media) French edition	39
French Albums (SNEP)	5
German Albums (Offizielle Top 100)	81
Greek Foreign Albums (IFPI)	1
Italian Albums (FIMI)	29
Mexican Albums (Top 100 Mexico)	30
New Zealand Albums (RMNZ)	18
Portuguese Albums (AFP)	24
Scottish Albums (OCC)	17
South Korean Albums (Circle)	17
South Korean International Albums (Circle)	2
UK Albums (OCC)	11

== Year-end charts ==
=== Year-end video charts ===
2010 year-end video chart performance
Chart (2010)	Position
US Music Video Sales (Billboard)	10

2016 year-end video chart performance
Chart (2016)	Position
French Music DVD (SNEP)	10

=== Year-end album charts ===
Year-end album chart performance
Chart (2010)	Position
French Albums (SNEP)	125

== Certifications ==
=== Video certifications ===
Video certifications
Region	Certification	Certified units/sales
Canada (Music Canada) French edition	Diamond	100,000^{^}
Canada (Music Canada) English edition	4× Platinum	40,000^{^}
United States (RIAA)	Platinum	100,000^{^}
^{^} Shipments figures based on certification alone.

=== Album certifications ===
Album certifications
Region	Certification	Certified units/sales
France (SNEP)	Gold	50,000^{*}
United Kingdom (BPI)	Gold	100,000^{‡}
^{*} Sales figures based on certification alone.^{‡} Sales+streaming figures based on certification alone.

== Release history ==
Release history
Region	Date	Label	Format	Catalog
Australia	29 April 2010	Columbia	DVD/CD	88697689969
France	3 May 2010	Columbia	DVD/CD	88697673669
Canada	4 May 2010	Columbia	DVD/CD	88697673649 (English); 88697673669 (French)
United Kingdom	10 May 2010	Columbia	DVD/CD	88697689969
United States	11 May 2010	Columbia	DVD/CD	88697673649
United Kingdom	17 May 2010	Columbia	2DVD	88697673689
France	17 May 2010	Columbia	2DVD	88697673699
Canada	25 May 2010	Columbia	2DVD	88697673689 (English); 88697673699 (French)
United States	25 May 2010	Columbia	2DVD	88697673689
Japan	4 August 2010	SMEJ	DVD/CD	SIBP-164〜SIBP-165

== See also ==
- Celine: Through the Eyes of the World
- Taking Chances World Tour
