= Celine: Through the Eyes of the World =

- Theatrical release poster
- Directed by: Stéphane Laporte
- Produced by: Julie Snyder
- Starring: Celine Dion; René Angélil; René-Charles Angélil
- Distributed by: The Hot Ticket
- Release date: 16 February 2010 (Miami)
- Running time: 180 minutes
- Country: Canada
- Languages: English; French

Celine: Through the Eyes of the World is a documentary–concert film chronicling Canadian singer Celine Dion during her 2008–2009 Taking Chances World Tour. It premiered in Miami on 16 February 2010 and opened in North American theaters on 17 February 2010 through The Hot Ticket. The film also screened in Australia and the United Kingdom. Reviews were mixed, with critics noting that the documentary is primarily aimed at fans. In Canada, it grossed $1,027,341 and became the number‑one domestic film of the year.

The film was released on DVD and Blu‑ray on 29 April 2010 in Australia and in early May 2010 in Europe and North America. The home‑media edition adds an extra hour of material not included in the limited theatrical run. In Francophone markets, it was issued as Céline: autour du monde. The DVD/Blu‑ray release achieved strong commercial results, reaching number one in Canada, the United Kingdom, and Belgium, and number two in the United States, France, Australia, New Zealand, the Netherlands, Sweden, Argentina, and South Africa. It also placed inside the top 10 in several additional territories. The release was certified double diamond in Canada, platinum in France, and gold in the United States and Australia.

== Background and release ==
During the Taking Chances World Tour, Dion performed across five continents, 25 countries, and 93 cities, selling more than three million tickets. Running from February 2008 to February 2009 and including both Anglophone and Francophone setlists, the tour broke attendance and box‑office records at venues worldwide.

In December 2009, Sony Pictures announced that its division, The Hot Ticket, would distribute a feature‑length film titled Celine: Through the Eyes of the World.

Combining concert material with extensive behind‑the‑scenes footage, the documentary follows Dion on stage, backstage, and during private family moments. It was filmed by Jean Lamoureux and directed by Stéphane Laporte. Dion commented: "This was an amazing world tour, but there's a lot more than just concert footage on this film. I let the cameras follow me everywhere. There are a lot of ups and downs, and it's very personal... and it's definitely the most intimate journey that I've ever shared with my fans".

Dion promoted the film on The Oprah Winfrey Show on 10 February 2010 and on Larry King Live on 15 February 2010. She also attended the Miami premiere on 16 February 2010.

Beginning 17 February 2010, the film screened for eight days in select North American theaters. Sony Pictures also released it in Australian cinemas from 18 to 24 February 2010. In the United Kingdom, it screened in Vue, Odeon, and Cineworld theaters in late February 2010.

== Concert footage ==
The documentary follows Dion throughout the Taking Chances World Tour, combining behind‑the‑scenes material with concert performances, most of which appear in edited form. Full performances are available on the live release Taking Chances World Tour: The Concert. The following songs are featured in Celine: Through the Eyes of the World:

1. "I Drove All Night"
2. "Love Can Move Mountains"
3. "I've Got the Music in Me"
4. "I'm Alive"
5. "We Will Rock You"
6. "Watashi Wa Totemo Shiawase Ne"
7. "A World to Believe In" (with Yuna Ito)
8. "To Love You More"
9. "Taking Chances"
10. "It's All Coming Back to Me Now"
11. "Eyes on Me"
12. "The Show Must Go On"
13. "The Power of Love"
14. "Shadow of Love"
15. "All by Myself"
16. "Alone"
17. "Dans un autre monde"
18. "Un garçon pas comme les autres (Ziggy)"
19. "Pour que tu m'aimes encore"
20. "J'irai où tu iras" (with Marc Langis)
21. "A Song for You"
22. "The Prayer" (with Andrea Bocelli)
23. "I'm Your Angel" (with Barnev Valsaint)
24. "S'il suffisait d'aimer"
25. "My Love"
26. "Because You Loved Me" (with Charice)
27. "It's a Man's Man's Man's World"
28. "River Deep, Mountain High"
29. "My Heart Will Go On"

== Critical reception ==
Professional ratings
Aggregate scores
Source	Rating
Metacritic	52/100
Review scores
Source	Rating
AllMovie	3/5 stars
Boston Herald	A−
Boxoffice Pro	3/5 stars
The Gazette	3/5 stars
The Globe and Mail	2/4 stars
Los Angeles Times	2/4 stars
Quad-City Times	3/4 stars
Toronto Star	3.5/4 stars
Toronto Sun	3.5/5 stars
USA Today	3/4 stars

Review aggregator Metacritic, which assigns weighted average scores out of 100 based on reviews from mainstream critics, gave the film a score of 52 out of 100 from four reviews, indicating a "mixed or average" reception.

Elysa Gardner of USA Today awarded the film three out of four stars, writing that "Celine Dion may be responsible for some of the smoothest, most syrupy pop recordings in recent decades, but in concert, she is a pit bull". Lauren Carter of the Boston Herald gave the documentary an A−, noting that it "succeeds because it lets us in on Celine the person as much as Celine the performer". Richard Ouzounian of the Toronto Star rated it 3.5 out of 4 stars, calling the film "more than just a collection of the Quebec singer's greatest hits performed in concert" and praising its behind‑the‑scenes insight into Dion's life and touring experience.

Michelle Coudé-Lord of the Toronto Sun gave the film 3.5 out of 5 stars, describing it as "a must-see" that "perfectly depicts the bond between [Dion] and Angélil" and presents the singer as "human, real and authentic". John Griffin of The Gazette rated it three out of five stars, writing that "fans die and go to pop heaven" while "non-fans discover her real appeal" through the documentary's candid approach. Linda Cook of the Quad-City Times awarded it three out of four stars, noting that she was "pleasantly surprised" by the film's emotional impact and highlighting its portrayal of Dion's global fanbase and family life on tour.

Sara Schieron of Boxoffice Pro gave the film three out of five stars, praising Dion and her family for handling fame "with a unique grace" and predicting strong audience interest. Carl Wilson of The Globe and Mail wrote that "you have to admit Dion is the James Brown of her generation – the hardest working woman in showbusiness". Sam Adams of the Los Angeles Times commented that the film portrays Dion "sitting pretty, on top of the world and happy to stay there".

== Box office ==
In Canada, Celine: Through the Eyes of the World opened in 81 theatres and entered the domestic chart at number two, earning $240,942 after its first two days. In its second week, the film expanded to 89 theatres, rose to number one among domestic releases, and grossed $476,412. It remained at the top position in its third week, earning $309,987 from 54 theatres. After three weeks and eight days of screenings (17, 18, 20, 21, 22, 25, 27, and 28 February 2010), the Canadian gross stood at $1,027,341.

In Australia, the film earned $213,583 from 45 screens, averaging $4,746 per theatre, and ranked as the 17th most‑attended film for the week of 18–24 February 2010.

== Home media ==
Celine: Through the Eyes of the World

Video by Celine Dion
- Released: 29 April 2010
- Recorded: 2008–2009
- Genre: Pop
- Length: 173:00
- Languages: English; French
- Label: Columbia
- Director: Stéphane Laporte
- Producer: Julie Snyder

Celine Dion chronology
Céline sur les Plaines (2008)	Celine: Through the Eyes of the World (2010)	Taking Chances World Tour: The Concert (2010)

Celine: Through the Eyes of the World was released on DVD and Blu‑ray on 29 April 2010 in Australia, followed by early‑May 2010 distribution across Europe and North America. In French‑speaking countries, the film appeared under the title Céline: autour du monde.

The home‑media edition runs for three hours and includes an additional hour of material not shown during the film's limited theatrical engagement. Its release coincided with the DVD/CD edition of Taking Chances World Tour: The Concert (Tournée mondiale Taking Chances: le spectacle in Francophone markets), issued the same day.

A limited two‑DVD edition pairing Celine: Through the Eyes of the World with Taking Chances World Tour: The Concert was released in mid‑May 2010, accompanied by a 52‑page booklet and fold‑out souvenir postcards. QVC also offered an exclusive version with a bonus CD containing tracks absent from the standard Taking Chances World Tour: The Concert CD: "I'm Alive", "Fade Away", "Pour que tu m'aimes encore", "We Will Rock You", and "The Show Must Go On".

=== Commercial performance ===
In Canada, Dion's new DVD releases debuted in the top three positions on the Nielsen SoundScan Music Video chart. Celine: Through the Eyes of the World opened at number one with 69,000 copies sold. Its first‑week total was the second‑highest ever for a music DVD in Canada, surpassed only by Dion's own Live in Las Vegas: A New Day... (2007). Tournée mondiale Taking Chances: le spectacle debuted at number two with 31,000 units sold, followed by Taking Chances World Tour: The Concert at number three with 8,000 copies. This marked only the second time since 2004—after Hilary Duff—that an artist held the entire top three of the Canadian Music Video chart. With more than 100,000 combined units sold across all three titles in a single week, Dion set a national record for music‑DVD sales.

On 21 May 2010, CRIA certified all three releases: Celine: Through the Eyes of the World earned double diamond for 200,000 copies; Tournée mondiale Taking Chances: le spectacle received diamond for 100,000 units; and Taking Chances World Tour: The Concert was awarded four‑times platinum for 40,000 copies. Celine: Through the Eyes of the World became one of the fastest Canadian releases to reach double‑diamond status.

In the United States, Dion entered the Billboard Top Music Video Sales chart at numbers one and two with Taking Chances World Tour: The Concert and Celine: Through the Eyes of the World, respectively. She became the first artist outside of Bill and Gloria Gaither, and the Gaither Vocal Band, to debut simultaneously in the chart's top two positions. Taking Chances World Tour: The Concert sold 26,000 copies in its first week, while Celine: Through the Eyes of the World sold 15,000 units. On 16 July 2010, the RIAA certified Taking Chances World Tour: The Concert platinum for shipments of 100,000 copies and Celine: Through the Eyes of the World gold for 50,000 units. On Billboard's 2010 Year‑End Top Music Video Sales chart, the titles ranked at numbers 10 and 19, respectively. Nielsen SoundScan reported year‑end totals of 76,000 copies for Taking Chances World Tour: The Concert and 50,000 for Celine: Through the Eyes of the World.

Celine: Through the Eyes of the World also topped the DVD charts in the United Kingdom and Belgium (both Wallonia and Flanders), and reached the top ten in several additional markets. It was certified platinum in France, where it sold 17,800 copies in 2010. The DVD was also certified gold in Australia in May 2010.

=== Track listing ===
No.	Title	Length
1.	"Africa"
2.	"Asia" (Part 1)
3.	"Oceania"
4.	"Asia" (Part 2)
5.	"Europe"
6.	"America"

=== Charts ===
==== Weekly DVD charts ====
Weekly video chart performance
DVD chart (2010)	Peak position
Argentine Music DVD (CAPIF)	2
Australian Music DVD (ARIA)	2
Austrian Music DVD (Ö3 Austria)	8
Belgian Music DVD (Ultratop Flanders)	1
Belgian Music DVD (Ultratop Wallonia)	1
Czech Republic Music DVD (ČNS IFPI)	5
Canadian Music DVD (Nielsen SoundScan)	1
Danish Music DVD (Hitlisten)	3
Dutch Music DVD (MegaCharts)	2
Finnish Music DVD (Suomen virallinen lista)	7
French Music DVD (SNEP)	2
German Music DVD (Media Control)	6
Hungarian Music DVD (MAHASZ)	3
Irish Music DVD (IRMA)	5
Italian Music DVD (FIMI)	3
New Zealand Music DVD (Recorded Music NZ)	2
Portuguese Music DVD (AFP)	8
South African Music DVD (RISA)	2
Spanish Music DVD (Promusicae)	17
Swedish Music DVD (Sverigetopplistan)	2
Swiss Music DVD (Schweizer Hitparade)	4
UK Music Videos (Official Charts)	1
US Music Video Sales (Billboard)	2

==== Weekly album charts ====
Weekly album chart performance
Album chart (2010)	Peak position
Czech Albums (ČNS IFPI)	50
South Korean International Albums (GAON)	93

==== Year-end DVD charts ====
Year-end chart performance
DVD chart (2010)	Position
Belgian Music DVD (Ultratop Flanders)	11
Belgian Music DVD (Ultratop Wallonia)	9
Dutch Music DVD (MegaCharts)	32
French Music DVD (SNEP)	13
Swedish Music DVD (Sverigetopplistan)	64
US Music Video Sales (Billboard)	19

=== Certifications and sales ===
Certifications
Region	Certification	Certified units/sales
Australia (ARIA)	Gold	7,500^{^}
Canada (Music Canada)	2× Diamond	200,000^{^}
France (SNEP)	Platinum	17,800
United States (RIAA)	Gold	50,000^{^}
^{^} Shipments figures based on certification alone.

=== Release history ===
Release history
Region	Date	Label	Format	Catalog
Australia	29 April 2010	Columbia	DVD; Blu-ray	88697583039; 88697583069
France	3 May 2010	Columbia	DVD; Blu-ray	88697650829; 88697583069
Canada	4 May 2010	Columbia	DVD; Blu-ray	88697650829; 88697583069
United Kingdom	10 May 2010	Columbia	DVD; Blu-ray	88697583039; 88697583069
United States	11 May 2010	Columbia	DVD; Blu-ray	88697583039; 88697583069
United Kingdom	17 May 2010	Columbia	2DVD	88697673689
France	17 May 2010	Columbia	2DVD	88697673699
Canada	25 May 2010	Columbia	2DVD	88697673699
United States	25 May 2010	Columbia	2DVD	88697673689
Japan	4 August 2010	SMEJ	DVD	SIBP-163

== See also ==
- Taking Chances World Tour: The Concert
- Taking Chances World Tour
