= My Love: Essential Collection =

Greatest hits album by Celine Dion
- Released: 24 October 2008
- Recorded: 1990–2008
- Genre: Pop
- Length: 121:58 (North America); 158:08 (Europe)
- Label: Columbia
- Producers: Walter Afanasieff; Peer Åström; Babyface; Anders Bagge; Carole Bayer Sager; Erick Benzi; Roy Bittan; Jeff Bova; Luigi Caiola; Kara DioGuardi; David Foster; Jean-Jacques Goldman; Dan Hill; James Horner; Jimmy Jam; John Jones; Richie Jones; Quincy Jones; R. Kelly; Emanuel Kiriakou; Robert John "Mutt" Lange; Terry Lewis; Kristian Lundin; Vito Luprano; George Martin; Giles Martin; Max Martin; Ben Moody; Christopher Neil; Aldo Nova; Rick Nowels; Gérald de Palmas; Linda Perry; Tony Renis; Steven Rinkoff; Guy Roche; S.A.F.; John Shanks; Billy Steinberg; Jim Steinman; Ric Wake; Big Jim Wright

Celine Dion chronology
Complete Best (2008)	My Love: Essential Collection (2008)	Taking Chances World Tour: The Concert (2010)

Singles from My Love: Essential Collection
- 1. "My Love" Released: 23 September 2008

My Love: Essential Collection is the third English-language greatest hits album by Canadian recording artist Celine Dion. It was released by Columbia Records on 24 October 2008 as a follow-up to her previous English-language compilation, All the Way... A Decade of Song (1999). My Love: Essential Collection includes many of Dion's most successful singles, such as "My Heart Will Go On", "Because You Loved Me", "The Power of Love", and "It's All Coming Back to Me Now". It also contains one new track, "There Comes a Time". Expanded editions titled My Love: Ultimate Essential Collection and The Essential Celine Dion 3.0 were later issued. In July 2011, the album was re-released with the same track listing as part of Sony's The Essential line. The album was not issued in Japan, where Sony Music instead released Complete Best.

My Love: Essential Collection reached number one on the albums charts in the Netherlands, Belgium, and Ireland, as well as the compilation albums chart in France. It peaked at number two in Canada, number five in the United Kingdom, and number eight in the United States. The album was certified five-times platinum in the UK, four-times platinum in Canada, double-platinum in Ireland, platinum in Belgium, the Netherlands, Australia, and New Zealand, and gold in Mexico, Finland, Germany, and Hungary. In most territories, the album's first single was a live recording of "My Love", a semi-autobiographical song written for Dion by Linda Perry and originally released on Taking Chances (2007). In France, a new remix of "I'm Alive" was issued as a promotional single instead.

== Background ==
Dion gave her final performance of A New Day... on 15 December 2007. The Las Vegas production, which had been seen by nearly three million spectators across 717 shows since its premiere in March 2003, came to an end. On 14 February 2008, she began her first worldwide concert tour in over nine years. The Taking Chances World Tour included many of her best-known songs, as well as material from her then-new album, Taking Chances. The tour played to sold-out stadiums and arenas throughout 2008. By its conclusion at the end of February 2009, it had visited five continents, 23 countries, and 93 cities, performing for an audience of more than three million people.

On 27 August 2008, Dion's official website announced that a new greatest hits album would be released in October 2008. On 5 September 2008, it was confirmed that the album would be issued in two formats: a one-disc edition titled My Love: Essential Collection and a two-disc edition titled My Love: Ultimate Essential Collection. The track listing was posted on 11 September 2008. "My Love", originally included on Taking Chances, was confirmed as the first single in an official press release on 22 September 2008. My Love: Essential Collection includes a live version of the song, which premiered on 17 September 2008, and the live music video was released seven days later. The lyrics to the album's only new track, "There Comes a Time", were posted on 7 October 2008 on Dion's official website, followed by an excerpt of the song on 23 October 2008.

The artwork for My Love: Essential Collection shows a close-up photograph of Dion wearing a white blouse and a black camera around her neck. The background consists of blurred white and purple imagery, with Dion's name and the album title printed in white lettering. The photograph was taken by Denise Truscello in a Los Angeles studio in 2007. Dion expressed appreciation for working with Truscello, describing their collaboration positively: "Out of all the people I've worked with, she's the absolute best. I've worked with her for six years, and she's always kind to everybody. Super, super kind".

== Content ==
My Love: Essential Collection includes 17 songs on the US edition and 18 on the European edition. The US version contains the Billboard Hot 100 number one singles "The Power of Love", "Because You Loved Me", "My Heart Will Go On", and "I'm Your Angel". The European edition includes the UK number one single "Think Twice".

A two-disc edition, titled My Love: Ultimate Essential Collection, was released at the same time. It contains 27 songs on the US version and 36 on the European version. The US edition includes three rare recordings not previously issued on a Dion album: "(You Make Me Feel Like) A Natural Woman" (from Tapestry Revisited: A Tribute to Carole King), "Dance with My Father" (from So Amazing: An All-Star Tribute to Luther Vandross), and "I Knew I Loved You" (from We All Love Ennio Morricone). The European edition also includes singles that were successful in European markets.

In July 2011, the album was reissued as part of The Essential series, using either the US or European track listing depending on the country. A limited US-exclusive edition, titled The Essential 3.0, was released on 29 August 2011. It includes a bonus third disc with seven additional tracks, among them alternate versions of "Think Twice" and "Only One Road". On 5 April 2024, the album was issued on vinyl for the first time. The track listing is similar to the original European edition, but also includes "Where Does My Heart Beat Now" and "If You Asked Me To", while omitting "Alone".

== Singles ==
My Love: Essential Collection was released while Dion was on her Taking Chances World Tour. During her concert in Stockholm, Sweden, on 7 June 2008, she recorded a live version of "My Love", which was later confirmed as the first single from the compilation. The song premiered on radio on 22 September 2008, and a digital single was issued the following day, accompanied by a live music video. Chuck Taylor, senior editor at Billboard, described "My Love" as a strong selection for the album and praised Linda Perry's songwriting and Dion's performance, calling it a highly emotive ballad about longing and uncertainty. After debuting on the US Adult Contemporary chart, "My Love" became Dion's 16th adult contemporary entry of the 2000s, giving her the most charted titles in the format during that decade. The song peaked at number 15.

The next single, "I'm Alive", was remixed by Laurent Wolf and released to French radio in October 2008 to promote the album instead of "My Love". In January 2009, new remixes of "I'm Alive" by Maurice Joshua were distributed to US clubs. They reached number 35 on the Hot Dance Club Songs chart. "I'm Alive" had originally been released as a single from A New Day Has Come in 2002, peaking at number seven in France and number six on the US Adult Contemporary chart.

== Promotion ==
The performance of "My Love" was broadcast for the first time on television on 31 August 2008 during the 43rd annual MDA Labor Day Telethon. On 28 October 2008, an episode of The Oprah Winfrey Show was dedicated to Dion, as well as several stories about parents and young children facing serious illnesses. Dion appeared throughout the special, titled Miracle Children with Celine Dion, which also addressed her own challenges with childbirth. She concluded the episode with a live performance of "My Love". The following day, Dion postponed her 30 October concert in Minneapolis, along with several November 2008 dates, citing illness. On 1 December 2008, she performed "My Love" on The Tonight Show with Jay Leno. On 13 December 2008, her official website posted behind-the-scenes footage from the recording sessions for "There Comes a Time".

The Taking Chances World Tour ended on 26 February 2009, and on 1 March 2009 Dion made her final public appearance before a temporary break from the music industry on Star Académie in Canada. She performed a medley of her French- and English-language hits with the contestants. After the appearance, Dion began a temporary hiatus to focus on her family and attempts to conceive another child. Aside from her televised performances, "My Love" was included throughout the Taking Chances World Tour, beginning with the concert in Seoul on 18 March 2008. The song was later included on Taking Chances World Tour: The Concert, released on DVD and CD in April 2010.

== Critical reception ==
Professional ratings
Review scores
Source	Rating
AllMusic	4/5 stars
Daily Express	5/5 stars

Stephen Thomas Erlewine, senior editor of AllMusic, wrote that My Love: Essential Collection compensates for how All the Way... A Decade of Song (1999) focused heavily on newer material at the expense of Dion's earlier hits. He stated that My Love: Essential Collection "fits the bill well" for listeners seeking an overview of Dion's two decades as an international star, noting that it includes all of her major adult contemporary successes. Erlewine also observed that although Dion achieved additional hits in the decade following All the Way... A Decade of Song, with the exception of her cover of Roy Orbison's "I Drove All Night", few of her 2000s singles are as enduring as her 1990s output.

== Commercial reception ==
My Love: Essential Collection debuted at number eight on the US Billboard 200, becoming Dion's 11th top 10 album on the chart, with first‑week sales of 57,000 copies. On the Canadian Albums Chart, it debuted at number two with sales of 17,700 copies, and fell to number three the following week with an additional 11,000 copies sold. In its third week, the album dropped to number six, and by January 2009 it was certified double platinum by CRIA, denoting shipments of 160,000 copies. In 2021, My Love: Essential Collection was further certified four times platinum for sales of 320,000 units.

In the United Kingdom, the album debuted at number five with sales of 42,411 copies and was certified five times platinum for shipments exceeding 1,500,000 units. In Ireland, it reached number one and was certified double platinum in 2008. The album remained popular in both countries, re‑entering the charts multiple times and spending 327 weeks on the Irish chart.

My Love: Essential Collection debuted at number one in France and the Netherlands, holding the top position for two weeks in both countries. It also topped the chart in Belgium's Flanders and reached the top 10 in several European markets, peaking at number six on the European Top 100 Albums. The album also entered the top 10 in New Zealand and Mexico, and earned platinum certifications in Australia, New Zealand, Belgium, and the Netherlands, and gold certifications in Germany, Finland, Hungary, and Mexico.

Worldwide, the album ranked as the 42nd best‑selling album of 2008, according to the IFPI. In 2011, Sony Music issued The Essential with the same track listing. The release was certified gold in Australia and Poland, and silver in the UK.

== Track listing ==
North American edition (disc one)
No.	Title	Writer(s)	Producer(s)	Length
1.	"Where Does My Heart Beat Now"	Robert White Johnson; Taylor Rhodes	Christopher Neil	4:33
2.	"Beauty and the Beast" (with Peabo Bryson)	Alan Menken; Howard Ashman	Walter Afanasieff	4:04
3.	"If You Asked Me To"	Diane Warren	Guy Roche	3:55
4.	"Love Can Move Mountains" (new edit)	Warren	Ric Wake	4:01
5.	"My Love" (live version)	Linda Perry	Perry	5:04
6.	"The Power of Love" (radio edit)	Gunther Mende; Candy DeRouge; Jennifer Rush; Mary Susan Applegate	David Foster	4:49
7.	"(You Make Me Feel Like) A Natural Woman"	Gerry Goffin; Carole King; Jerry Wexler	Foster	3:40
8.	"Because You Loved Me"	Warren	Foster	4:35
9.	"The Power of the Dream"	Foster; Babyface; Linda Thompson	Foster; Babyface^{[a]}	4:30
10.	"It's All Coming Back to Me Now"	Jim Steinman	Steinman; Steven Rinkoff^{[a]}; Roy Bittan^{[a]}	7:37
11.	"All by Myself" (new edit)	Eric Carmen; Sergei Rachmaninoff	Foster	5:08
12.	"Pour que tu m'aimes encore"	Jean-Jacques Goldman	Goldman; Erick Benzi	4:14
13.	"Tell Him" (with Barbra Streisand)	Thompson; Afanasieff; Foster	Foster; Afanasieff	4:51
Total length:				61:01

North American edition (disc two)
No.	Title	Writer(s)	Producer(s)	Length
1.	"My Heart Will Go On"	James Horner; Will Jennings	Afanasieff; Horner^{[a]}	4:41
2.	"To Love You More" (radio edit)	Foster; Junior Miles	Foster	4:42
3.	"River Deep, Mountain High"	Ellie Greenwich; Jeff Barry; Phil Spector	Steinman; Rinkoff^{[a]}	4:10
4.	"I'm Your Angel" (with R. Kelly)	Kelly	Kelly	5:31
5.	"The Prayer" (with Andrea Bocelli)	Carole Bayer Sager; Foster; Alberto Testa^{[c]}; Tony Renis^{[c]}	Foster; Renis^{[a]}; Sager^{[a]}	4:29
6.	"That's the Way It Is"	Max Martin; Kristian Lundin; Andreas Carlsson	Martin; Lundin	4:03
7.	"A New Day Has Come" (radio remix)	Aldo Nova; Stephan Moccio	Wake; Afanasieff; Nova; Richie Jones^{[b]}; S.A.F.^{[b]}	4:23
8.	"I'm Alive"	Lundin; Carlsson	Lundin; Wake^{[b]}; R. Jones^{[b]}	3:30
9.	"I Drove All Night"	Billy Steinberg; Tom Kelly	Peer Åström; Vito Luprano	4:00
10.	"Taking Chances"	Kara DioGuardi; Dave Stewart	John Shanks	4:07
11.	"There Comes a Time"	Jörgen Elofsson; Elizabeth Rodrigues	Emanuel Kiriakou	4:03
12.	"Dance with My Father"	Luther Vandross; Richard Marx	Jimmy Jam; Terry Lewis; Big Jim Wright^{[a]}	4:38
13.	"I Knew I Loved You"	Ennio Morricone; Alan Bergman; Marilyn Bergman	Luigi Caiola; Quincy Jones	4:31
14.	"My Love" (radio version) (hidden track)	Perry	Perry	4:09
Total length:				60:57

European edition (disc one)
No.	Title	Writer(s)	Producer(s)	Length
1.	"My Heart Will Go On"	Horner; Jennings	Afanasieff; Horner^{[a]}	4:41
2.	"Think Twice"	Andy Hill; Peter Sinfield	Neil; Nova^{[b]}	4:48
3.	"It's All Coming Back to Me Now" (radio edit)	Steinman	Steinman; Rinkoff^{[a]}; Bittan^{[a]}	5:20
4.	"A New Day Has Come" (radio remix)	Nova; Moccio	Wake; Afanasieff; Nova; R. Jones^{[b]}; Burkholder^{[b]}; Dold^{[b]}	4:23
5.	"My Love" (live version)	Perry	Perry	5:04
6.	"Taking Chances"	DioGuardi; Stewart	Shanks	4:07
7.	"That's the Way It Is"	Martin; Lundin; Carlsson	Martin; Lundin	4:03
8.	"The Power of Love" (radio edit)	Mende; DeRouge; Rush; Applegate	Foster	4:49
9.	"Because You Loved Me"	Warren	Foster	4:35
10.	"Tell Him" (with Barbra Streisand)	Thompson; Afanasieff; Foster	Foster; Afanasieff	4:51
11.	"Falling into You"	Steinberg; Rick Nowels; Marie-Claire D'Ubaldo	Nowels; Steinberg	4:18
12.	"I Drove All Night"	Steinberg; Kelly	Åström; Luprano	4:00
13.	"I'm Alive"	Lundin; Carlsson	Lundin; Wake^{[b]}; R. Jones^{[b]}	3:30
14.	"All by Myself" (radio edit)	Carmen; Rachmaninoff	Foster	4:00
15.	"Alone"	Steinberg; Kelly	Ben Moody	3:23
16.	"Immortality" (with the Bee Gees)	Barry Gibb; Robin Gibb; Maurice Gibb	Afanasieff	4:12
17.	"Beauty and the Beast" (with Peabo Bryson)	Menken; Ashman	Afanasieff	4:04
18.	"There Comes a Time"	Elofsson; Rodrigues	Kiriakou	4:03
Total length:				78:11

European edition (disc two)
No.	Title	Writer(s)	Producer(s)	Length
1.	"River Deep, Mountain High"	Greenwich; Barry; Spector	Steinman; Rinkoff^{[a]}	4:10
2.	"One Heart"	Shanks; DioGuardi	Shanks; DioGuardi	3:24
3.	"I'm Your Angel" (with R. Kelly)	Kelly	Kelly	5:31
4.	"Only One Road"	Peter Zizzo	Wake	4:49
5.	"Pour que tu m'aimes encore"	Goldman	Goldman; Benzi	4:14
6.	"You and I"	Nova; Jacques Duval	Nova; Åström	4:05
7.	"To Love You More" (radio edit)	Foster; Miles	Foster	4:42
8.	"Eyes on Me"	Lundin; Savan Kotecha; Delta Goodrem	Lundin	3:53
9.	"Have You Ever Been in Love"	Anders Bagge; Åström; Tom Nichols; Daryl Hall; Laila Bagge Wahlgren	Bagge; Åström	4:08
10.	"The Reason"	King; Mark Hudson; Greg Wells	George Martin; Giles Martin^{[d]}	5:01
11.	"Seduces Me"	Dan Hill; John Sheard	Rick Hahn; Hill; John Jones	3:46
12.	"The First Time Ever I Saw Your Face"	Ewan MacColl	Foster	4:09
13.	"Dance with My Father"	Vandross; Marx	Jam; Lewis; Wright^{[a]}	4:38
14.	"Misled"	Zizzo; Jimmy Bralower	Wake	3:30
15.	"Love Can Move Mountains" (new edit)	Warren	Wake	4:01
16.	"Call the Man"	Hill; Sinfield	Steinman; Rinkoff^{[a]}; Jeff Bova^{[a]}	6:08
17.	"Goodbye's (The Saddest Word)"	Robert John "Mutt" Lange	Lange	5:19
18.	"The Prayer" (with Andrea Bocelli)	Foster; Sager; Testa^{[c]}; Renis^{[c]}	Foster; Renis^{[a]}; Sager^{[a]}	4:29
Total length:				79:57

=== Notes ===
- ^{^[a]} signifies a co-producer
- ^{^[b]} signifies an additional producer
- ^{^[c]} signifies Italian translation
- ^{^[d]} signifies an assistant producer
- The two-disc French edition includes the North American track listing with "Falling into You", "Immortality", "Ten Days", and "One Heart".
- The one-disc editions include 17 to 19 tracks.
- The limited North American three-disc edition includes seven additional songs.
- The limited European digital edition includes five remixes.

== Personnel ==
Adapted from AllMusic.

- Walter Afanasieff – arranger, bass, composer, drum programming, keyboards, orchestral arrangements, orchestration, organ, Hammond organ, producer, programming, Synclavier, Synclavier guitar, synthesizer, synthesizer bass
- René Angélil – management
- Kenny Aronoff – drums
- Howard Ashman – composer
- Peer Åström – arranger, composer, guitar, instrumentation, mixing, producer, string arrangements, background vocals
- Jon Avnet – executive producer
- Babyface – composer, producer
- Anders Bagge – arranger, composer, producer
- Laila Bagge Wahlgren – composer
- Jeff Balding – engineering
- Jeff Barry – composer
- Alan Bergman – composer
- Marilyn Bergman – composer
- Curt Bisquera – cymbals, hi-hat
- Roy Bittan – piano, grand piano, piano arrangement, producer
- Paul Boutin – assistant engineer, mixing assistant
- Jeff Bova – arranger, keyboards, producer, programming, string arrangements, strings, synthesizer bass, track arrangement
- Stuart Brawley – assistant engineer, programming
- Robbie Buchanan – arranger
- Paul Buckmaster – string arrangements, string conductor
- Glen Burtnik – background vocals
- Teddy Campbell – drums
- Andreas Carlsson – composer, background vocals
- Eric Carmen – composer
- Chris Chaney – bass
- Maria Christensen – background vocals
- Steve Churchyard – engineering
- Kevin Churko – engineering, Pro Tools
- Luis Conte – percussion
- Lynn Davis – background vocals
- Kara DioGuardi – composer, producer, background vocals
- Celine Dion – performer, background vocals
- Rory Dodd – background vocals
- Jörgen Elofsson – composer
- Steve Ferrone – drums
- David Foster – arranger, composer, executive producer, keyboards, piano, producer, vocal arrangement
- Humberto Gatica – engineering, mixing, vocal engineering
- Stephen George – programming
- Serban Ghenea – mixing
- Barry Gibb – composer, background vocals
- Maurice Gibb – composer, background vocals
- Robin Gibb – composer, background vocals
- Jim Gilstrap – background vocals
- Gerry Goffin – composer
- Jean-Jacques Goldman – composer, producer
- Delta Goodrem – composer, background vocals
- Gavin Greenaway – string arrangements, string conductor
- Ellie Greenwich – composer
- Mick Guzauski – mixing
- Daryl Hall – composer
- Leah Haywood – background vocals
- Nana Hedin – background vocals
- Jerry Hey – arranger, conductor
- Andy Hill – composer
- Dan Hill – composer
- Tony Hinnigan – penny whistle
- David Hodges – piano
- Loris Holland – choir director, keyboards, Hammond organ
- James Horner – composer, producer
- Mark Hudson – composer
- Dann Huff – guitar
- Phillip Ingram – background vocals
- Paul Jackson Jr. – guitar
- Jimmy Jam – arranger, producer
- Will Jennings – composer
- Skyler Jett – background vocals
- Quincy Jones – producer
- R. Kelly – arranger, composer, producer
- Tom Kelly – composer
- Carole King – composer
- Emanuel Kiriakou – bass, engineering, acoustic guitar, electric guitar, percussion, piano, producer, programming
- Kofi – background vocals
- Savan Kotecha – composer
- Eric Kupper – keyboard programming
- Abe Laboriel Jr. – drums
- Michael Landau – guitar
- Robert John "Mutt" Lange – composer, guitar, producer, background vocals
- Terry Lewis – producer
- Ottmar Liebert – acoustic guitar
- Tomas Lindberg – bass
- Chris Lord-Alge – mixing
- Kristian Lundin – composer, engineering, keyboards, mixing, producer, programming, background vocals
- Ewan MacColl – composer
- Stephen Marcussen – mastering
- George Martin – conductor, orchestral arrangements, producer
- Giles Martin – assistant producer
- Max Martin – composer, engineering, keyboards, mixing, producer, programming, background vocals
- Eddie Martinez – guitar
- Richard Marx – composer
- Rob Mathes – conductor, orchestral arrangements, orchestration
- Jean McClain – background vocals
- Gunther Mende – composer
- Alan Menken – composer
- Rickey Minor – acoustic bass
- Chieli Minucci – guitar
- Stephan Moccio – composer
- Ben Moody – producer
- Ennio Morricone – composer
- Jamie Muhoberac – keyboards
- Christopher Neil – producer, background vocals
- Tom Nichols – composer
- Anna Nordell – background vocals
- Aldo Nova – composer, guitar, Irish fiddle, producer, soloist
- Rick Nowels – composer, gut-string guitar, keyboards, producer
- Marty O'Brien – acoustic bass
- Jeanette Olsson – background vocals
- Phil Palmer – guitar
- Dean Parks – guitar
- Linda Perry – composer
- Tim Renwick – guitar
- Taylor Rhodes – composer
- Cathy Richardson – background vocals
- Claytoven Richardson – background vocals
- John Robinson – drums
- Guy Roche – arranger, engineering, producer, synthesizer
- William Ross – arranger, conductor, orchestration, orchestral arrangements, string arrangements
- Todd Rundgren – vocal arrangement, background vocals
- Jennifer Rush – composer
- Mark Russell – production coordination
- Carole Bayer Sager – composer, producer
- John Shanks – bass, composer, guitar, mixing, producer, background vocals
- Dan Shea – drum programming, keyboards, programming, sound design
- John Sheard – composer
- Peter Sinfield – composer
- Phil Spector – composer
- Billy Steinberg – composer, producer
- Jim Steinman – arranger, composer, producer, track arrangement
- David A. Stewart – composer
- Kasim Sulton – background vocals
- Ian Thomas – drums
- Linda Thompson – composer
- Michael Thompson – guitar
- Pat Thrall – engineering
- Jeanie Tracy – background vocals
- Eric Troyer – background vocals
- Shania Twain – background vocals
- Luther Vandross – composer
- Maria Vidal – background vocals
- Ric Wake – arranger, producer, remix producer
- Diane Warren – composer
- Greg Wells – composer
- Jerry Wexler – composer
- Will Wheaton – background vocals
- Paul Wickens – bass, keyboards
- Aaron Zigman – programming
- Peter Zizzo – composer, guitar, background vocals

== Charts ==
=== Weekly charts ===
Weekly chart performance
Chart (2008–2010)	Peak position
Australian Albums (ARIA)	24
Austrian Albums (Ö3 Austria)	37
Belgian Albums (Ultratop Flanders)	1
Belgian Albums (Ultratop Wallonia)	3
Canadian Albums (Billboard)	2
Croatian International Albums (HDU)	9
Czech Albums (ČNS IFPI)	24
Danish Albums (Hitlisten)	4
Dutch Albums (Album Top 100)	1
European Albums (Music & Media)	6
Finnish Albums (Suomen virallinen lista)	11
French Compilations (SNEP)	1
German Albums (Offizielle Top 100)	24
Greek Foreign Albums (IFPI)	10
Hungarian Albums (MAHASZ)	8
Irish Albums (IRMA)	1
Italian Albums (FIMI)	21
Mexican Albums (Top 100 Mexico)	9
New Zealand Albums (RMNZ)	10
Polish Albums (ZPAV)	24
Portuguese Albums (AFP)	6
Quebec (ADISQ)	3
Scottish Albums (Official Charts)	6
South Korean International Albums (Circle)	19
Spanish Albums (Promusicae)	80
Swedish Albums (Sverigetopplistan)	6
Swiss Albums (Schweizer Hitparade)	9
UK Albums (Official Charts)	5
US Billboard 200	8

=== Year-end charts ===
2008 year-end chart performance
Chart (2008)	Position
Belgian Albums (Ultratop Flanders)	39
Belgian Albums (Ultratop Wallonia)	60
Danish Albums (Hitlisten)	19
Dutch Albums (Album Top 100)	19
Finnish Foreign Albums (Suomen virallinen lista)	9
French Compilations (SNEP)	27
Hungarian Albums (MAHASZ)	38
Irish Albums (IRMA)	17
Mexican Albums (AMPROFON)	78
UK Albums (OCC)	20
Worldwide Albums (IFPI)	42

2009 year-end chart performance
Chart (2009)	Position
Belgian Albums (Ultratop Flanders)	32
Belgian Albums (Ultratop Wallonia)	74
Canadian Albums (Billboard)	28
Dutch Albums (Album Top 100)	36
European Albums (Music & Media)	74
Hungarian Albums (MAHASZ)	16
Mexican Albums (AMPROFON)	69
US Billboard 200	159

2010 year-end chart performance
Chart (2010)	Position
UK Albums (OCC)	134

2011 year-end chart performance
Chart (2011)	Position
UK Albums (OCC)	86

2012 year-end chart performance
Chart (2012)	Position
UK Albums (OCC)	137

2013 year-end chart performance
Chart (2013)	Position
UK Albums (OCC)	146

2014 year-end chart performance
Chart (2014)	Position
Belgian Mid Price Albums (Ultratop Flanders)	18
Belgian Mid Price Albums (Ultratop Wallonia)	19

2015 year-end chart performance
Chart (2015)	Position
Belgian Mid Price Albums (Ultratop Flanders)	31

2016 year-end chart performance
Chart (2016)	Position
Belgian Mid Price Albums (Ultratop Flanders)	45

2024 year-end chart performance
Chart (2024)	Position
UK Albums (OCC)	95

2025 year-end chart performance
Chart (2025)	Position
UK Albums (OCC)	100

=== All-time charts ===
All-time chart performance
Chart	Position
Canadian Artists Albums (SoundScan)	119
Irish Albums Female Artists (OCC)	29
UK Albums (Females 2000–2020) (OCC)	56

== Certifications and sales ==
Certifications
Region	Certification	Certified units/sales
Australia (ARIA)	Platinum	70,000^{‡}
Belgium (BRMA)	Platinum	30,000^{*}
Canada (Music Canada)	4× Platinum	320,000^{‡}
Finland (Musiikkituottajat)	Gold	16,027
Germany (BVMI)	Gold	100,000^{‡}
Hungary (MAHASZ)	Gold	3,000^{^}
Ireland (IRMA)	2× Platinum	30,000^{^}
Mexico (AMPROFON)	Gold	40,000^{^}
Netherlands (NVPI)	Platinum	60,000^{^}
New Zealand (RMNZ)	Platinum	15,000^{‡}
United Kingdom (BPI)	5× Platinum	1,500,000^{‡}
United States	—	543,667
^{*} Sales figures based on certification alone.^{^} Shipments figures based on certification alone.^{‡} Sales+streaming figures based on certification alone.

== The Essential ==
In July 2011, My Love: Ultimate Essential Collection was reissued with the same track listing as part of Sony Music's The Essential series. It charted and was certified separately from the original release.

=== Charts ===
==== Weekly charts ====
Weekly chart performance
Chart (2011–2019)	Peak position
Australian Albums (ARIA)	91
French Albums (SNEP)	117
French Back Catalog Albums (SNEP)	19
Greek Albums (IFPI)	10
Irish Albums (IRMA)	24
Polish Albums (ZPAV)	5
Scottish Albums (Official Charts)	90
Slovenian Albums (IFPI)	9
South Korean Albums (Circle)	44
UK Album Downloads (Official Charts)	66

==== Year-end charts ====
Year-end chart performance
Chart (2019)	Position
Polish Albums (ZPAV)	81

=== Certifications ===
Certifications
Region	Certification	Certified units/sales
Australia (ARIA)	Gold	35,000^{‡}
Poland (ZPAV)	Gold	10,000^{‡}
United Kingdom (BPI)	Silver	60,000^{‡}
^{‡} Sales+streaming figures based on certification alone.

== Release history ==
Release history
Region	Date	Label	Format	Catalog
Europe	24 October 2008	Columbia	CD	88697400492
Europe	24 October 2008	Columbia	2CD	88697400502
Australia	27 October 2008	Columbia	2CD	88697374522
North America	28 October 2008	Columbia	CD	88697411432
North America	28 October 2008	Columbia	2CD	88697374522
Australia	11 July 2011	Legacy Recordings; The Essential	2CD	88697936772
Europe	15 July 2011	Legacy Recordings; The Essential	2CD	88697936772
North America	29 August 2011	Legacy Recordings; The Essential	3CD	886979487321
North America	13 September 2011	Legacy Recordings; The Essential	2CD	886979487222
Various	5 April 2024	Sony Legacy	Vinyl	196588794513

== See also ==
- 2008 in British music charts
- List of number-one albums of 2008 (Ireland)
