= Epidemic Sound =

Global royalty-free soundtrack company

Epidemic Sound AB
- Type: Private
- Industry: Music
- Founded: June 18, 2009; 17 years ago
- Founders: Peer Åström; David Stenmarck; Oscar Höglund; Jan Zachrisson; Hjalmar Winbladh
- Headquarters: Stockholm, Sweden
- Revenue: 78,496,922 (2021)
- Number of employees: 439 (2021)
- Website: epidemicsound.com

Epidemic Sound is a royalty-free soundtrack hosting company based in Stockholm, Sweden.

The company was established in 2009 by Peer Åström, David Stenmarck, Oscar Höglund, Hjalmar Winbladh and Jan Zachrisson.

Epidemic Sound has partnered with different brands including Adobe, DaVinci Resolve, iStock, Pinterest, and Canva. The company has raised around $500M in funding over 5 rounds. Their most recent equity round raised $450M from Blackstone Group and EQT Growth, which values Epidemic Sound at $1.4 billion. Both SVT and TV4 buy music from Epidemic Sound.
