= My Heart Will Go On =

1997 single by Celine Dion

- Standard cover art

Single by Celine Dion

from the album Let's Talk About Love and Titanic: Music from the Motion Picture
- B-side: "Rose" (US)
- Released: November 24, 1997
- Recorded: 1997
- Studio: WallyWorld (San Rafael); Hit Factory (New York)
- Genre: Pop
- Length: 4:40 (album version); 5:07 (soundtrack version)
- Label: Columbia; Epic
- Composer: James Horner
- Lyricist: Will Jennings
- Producers: Walter Afanasieff; James Horner; Simon Franglen

Celine Dion singles chronology
"The Reason" (1997)	"My Heart Will Go On" (1997)	"Immortality" (1998)

James Horner singles chronology
"An Ocean of Memories"	"My Heart Will Go On" (1997)	"Hymn to the Sea"

Audio sample
- Celine Dion – "My Heart Will Go On": file; help

Music video
- "My Heart Will Go On" on YouTube

"My Heart Will Go On" is a song recorded by the Canadian singer Celine Dion as the theme for the 1997 film Titanic. Composed by James Horner with lyrics by Will Jennings, it was issued internationally as a single by Columbia Records and Epic Records on November 24, 1997, and appeared on Dion's album Let's Talk About Love (1997) and the Titanic soundtrack.

Horner developed the melody as an instrumental motif for Titanic before proposing a vocal version. The Titanic director, James Cameron, initially opposed the inclusion of a pop ballad, but approved it after hearing Horner's demo. Horner and Simon Franglen produced the film version, while Walter Afanasieff produced the recording for Let's Talk About Love and the commercial single. The music video was directed by Bille Woodruff.

"My Heart Will Go On" topped charts in more than 25 countries and became the best-selling single of 1998. With estimated global sales exceeding 18 million copies, it is the second best-selling single by a woman and one of the best-selling singles of all time. It has earned gold or higher certifications in 18 countries, including diamond in France.

Widely regarded as Dion's signature song, "My Heart Will Go On" was named among the Songs of the Century by the Recording Industry Association of America and the National Endowment for the Arts. It received the Academy Award for Best Original Song and the Grammy Awards for Record of the Year, Song of the Year, Best Female Pop Vocal Performance and Best Song Written Specifically for a Motion Picture or for Television. In 2025, the Library of Congress selected it for the National Recording Registry as "culturally, historically, or aesthetically significant".

== Writing and recording ==
Before the release of the film Titanic, studio executives worried that it would be a commercial failure. Sony had paid $800,000 for the rights to the Titanic soundtrack album and hoped it would include a theme song. However, the director, James Cameron, felt that ending Titanic with a pop song would be inappropriate.

James Horner, the composer of the Titanic score, initially created "My Heart Will Go On" as an instrumental motif for the film. Wanting to prepare a vocal version for the end credits, he enlisted the lyricist Will Jennings, who wrote the lyrics "from the point of view of a person of a great age looking back so many years". Simon Franglen, who was working with Horner on electronic textures and synthesizers for the score, suggested Celine Dion, with whom he had collaborated on many hits. Dion initially did not want to record it, as she had already recorded the film songs "Beauty and the Beast" and "Because You Loved Me". However, her husband and producer, René Angélil, persuaded her to record a demo.

Horner waited until Cameron was in a receptive mood before presenting him with the demo. After listening several times, Cameron approved it, but worried he would be criticized for "going commercial at the end of the movie". He also wanted to reassure the anxious studio executives and understood that a successful song would improve his chances of completing the film. According to the music executive Tommy Mottola, Dion recorded her vocal in one take, and this version was used in the film.

The music producer Walter Afanasieff was not impressed with the demo, finding it meandering and dreary, but agreed to arrange and produce the studio version for Dion's 1997 album Let's Talk About Love. Afanasieff replaced every element of Horner's demo and was frustrated that Horner received a co-producer credit.

== Composition ==
"My Heart Will Go On" is in the key of E major. The verses follow the chord progression E–Bsus4–Aadd9–E–B, while the choruses follow C♯m–B–A–B. The song modulates to A♭ major at the end. It places weight on the instrumental arranging. The use of Tin Whistle is prominent, supported by melodic strings and rhythm guitars. The song uses both acoustic and electronic instrumentation. Dion's vocal performance is described as "emotional" and "demanding" by Pandora Radio.

The Horner–Franglen demo version of the ballad runs a little over five minutes and includes an extended ending with longer, segmented vocalizations by Dion. Franglen mixed the final film and soundtrack version, expanding on the demo and adding orchestra to the final chorus. This version appears on the Titanic soundtrack album and is also played over the ending credits of the film.

When the single was prepared for radio release, Walter Afanasieff provided additional production, added string and electric guitar parts, and rearranged sections. This version, which runs a little over four and a half minutes, appears on both the four-track maxi-single and Dion's album Let's Talk About Love. At the height of the song's popularity, some radio stations in the US and the UK played an edited version that inserted dramatic dialogue from Jack and Rose, the film's lead characters, between Dion's vocal lines.

=== Sissel Kyrkjebø ===
The Norwegian singer Sissel Kyrkjebø was scheduled to record "My Heart Will Go On" for Titanic in 1997, but Dion's vocals were chosen due to Horner's decision to support Dion's career. In a December 2014 interview, Horner said: "When I had completed the Titanic [film], I had to decide for Celine Dion or Sissel['s] [vocals]. Sissel I am very close, while Celine I had known since she was 18, and I had already written three film songs for [her]. But that was before Celine was known and filmmakers and marketing people had not done what they should have done for Celine and [her] songs. So I felt I owed her a Titanic chance, but I could [still] have used Sissel there". Instead, Kyrkjebø completed much of the score for the soundtrack album, Titanic: Music from the Motion Picture. Dion agreed to sing a demo for the film, despite being initially hesitant as she had already recorded three film songs earlier. Years later, Horner chose Kyrkjebø to perform "My Heart Will Go On" at both world premieres of Titanic 3D (2012) and Titanic Live (2015).

== Critical reception ==
"My Heart Will Go On" received mostly positive reviews. AllMusic senior editor Stephen Thomas Erlewine wrote that it "shines the most brilliantly" and marked it as a standout track from the Let's Talk About Love album. Another AllMusic reviewer, single editor Heather Phares, who rated the single 4 out of 5 stars, wrote, "Indeed, her performances of it on VH1 Divas, the 1998 Academy Awards (wearing the film's 'Heart of the Ocean' pendant, no less), and on her 1997 album Let's Talk About Love have cemented 'My Heart Will Go On' as the quintessence of Dion's sweeping, romantic style". Larry Flick from Billboard called it a "stately ballad" that "woos with romantic lyrics and a melancholy melody that is fleshed out with a weeping flute solo ... There's no denying that Dion can hit notes that shatter glass—and she does so here—but it's a pleasure to hear her build slowly and remind listeners of her ability to pack volumes of emotion in a whisper. A fine single that will add a much-needed touch of class to every station it graces."

Music Week named it "Single of the Week" and gave it five out of five, writing that "Dion delivers another stunning vocal on an Irish-style production". The Music Week critic Alan Jones felt the Celtic stylings "help the record build from quiet beginnings into a most powerful, stirring ballad, with Dion's voice adapting to whatever is required, from gentle breathiness to full throttle". People wrote that "the dramatics are fitting when she sings "My Heart Will Go On" as a survivor mourning the lover she lost when the big ship went down". Yahoo.com described it as an "emotional power ballad that perfectly captured [Titanic's] romantic yearning". Vulture said it was powerful, with "one of the most glorious key changes in recorded music history", and that "its legacy is eclipsed only by Whitney Houston's (admittedly far superior) song "I Will Always Love You". The Washington Post appreciated how the song was not just tagged on the end of the three-hour film, but has a lyrical motif that was already placed throughout the key moments of the film's love story to create a musical narrative.

In 2007, Rolling Stone ranked "My Heart Will Go On" the fourth most annoying song ever. In 2011, Rolling Stone readers ranked it the seventh-worst song of the 1990s, with Rolling Stone writing: "Celine Dion's song and the movie have aged very poorly...Now [the song] probably just makes you cringe". The Atlantic attributed the song's decline in popularity to its overexposure and added that over the years there have been many jokes that parody the lyrics by claiming "My Heart Will Go On" goes "on and on and on". Vulture reasoned that it has become fashionable to dislike the song because it "encapsulates most everything that once-enthusiastic moviegoers now dislike about Titanic: it's outdated, cheesy, and overly dramatic". Maxim deemed it "the second most tragic event ever to result from that fabled ocean liner". The Titanic star Kate Winslet said in 2012 that hearing it makes her "[feel] like throwing up".

== Commercial performance ==
"My Heart Will Go On" is one of the biggest radio hits and best-selling singles in history, with more than 18 million copies sold worldwide. It was the best-selling single of 1998 worldwide. As of March 2023, it had drawn five billion in cumulative airplay audience and more than 728 million official streams in the United States. Streams rose following the Titan submersible incident, which renewed interest in Titanic.

=== United States ===
In the United States, the single was limited to 658,000 copies. Despite this, it debuted at number one on the Billboard Hot 100 with sales of 360,000 copies, remaining there for two weeks. It spent 10 weeks at number one on the Billboard Hot 100 Airplay and two weeks atop the Hot 100 Singles Sales. In February 1998, it broke the record for the largest radio audience ever, reaching 117 million listeners. The single was certified gold in March 1998.

Billboard later reported that the digital version sold 1,133,000 units, bringing total US sales to 1,791,000 copies. In 2011 alone, Dion sold 956,000 digital tracks in the US, with "My Heart Will Go On" accounting for 163,000 downloads. As of November 2019, it has 588.2 million on-demand US streams, making it Dion's most streamed track in the country. In 2022, "My Heart Will Go On" was certified four times platinum in the US.

"My Heart Will Go On" also reached number one on several other US charts, including Billboard's Hot Adult Contemporary Tracks, Top 40 Mainstream, Hot Latin Pop Airplay, and Hot Latin Tracks. It became the first English-language song to top the Hot Latin Tracks chart, earning Dion a Billboard Latin Music Award.

=== United Kingdom ===
In the United Kingdom, the single debuted at number one with first-week sales of 234,000 copies. As of February 2022, it has sold more than 2,100,000 units, becoming Dion's second million-selling single in Britain after "Think Twice" (1995). It was the UK's second-best-selling single of 1998, behind Cher's "Believe". Dion became the first solo female artist to have multiple million-selling singles in Britain. "My Heart Will Go On" was certified four times platinum in the UK for sales of 2.4 million copies.

=== Rest of the world ===
In Germany, the single was certified four times platinum for sales exceeding two million copies, and ranked among the most popular singles ever released there. In France, it sold more than 1.2 million copies and was certified diamond. It also received four times platinum in Canada, triple platinum in Belgium, double platinum in Australia, New Zealand, the Netherlands, Norway, Sweden, and Switzerland, platinum in Denmark and Greece, and gold in Austria, Italy, Spain, and Mexico.

"My Heart Will Go On" was released twice in Japan. The January 1998 edition sold 205,300 copies and was certified double platinum. The June 1998 remixed edition sold 111,920 copies and was certified gold, as maxi-singles are treated as albums.

Internationally, "My Heart Will Go On" was exceptionally successful, topping charts for extended periods, including 17 weeks on the Eurochart Hot 100 Singles, 15 weeks in Switzerland, 13 weeks in France and Germany, 11 weeks in the Netherlands and Sweden, 10 weeks in Belgium's Wallonia, Denmark, Italy, and Norway, seven weeks in Belgium's Flanders, six weeks in Ireland and Canada, four weeks in Australia and Austria, two weeks in Spain and the United Kingdom, and one week in Finland.

== Music video ==
The music video was directed by Bille Woodruff and shows Dion singing at the bow of a ship, intercut with scenes from the film. It was filmed in front of a green screen in Los Angeles, with Titanic computer artists creating the background. On set, Dion performed a high-speed version for a visual effect used in the video.

In January 2018, a director's cut of the music video was released on YouTube. It includes previously unseen footage of Dion, such as her walking toward the bow and a segment digitally placing her into the film.

On March 23, 2023, a new music video was released to commemorate the 25th anniversary of Dion's performance at the 70th Academy Awards. It includes alternate, previously unseen footage from the original shoot and was restored from its original 35mm elements to 4K resolution.

== Live performances ==
MTV called Dion's performance at the 70th Academy Awards in 1998 "true perfection ... she sounds flawless". "My Heart Will Go On" was performed by Dion throughout her career, including during her Let's Talk About Love World Tour (1998–1999), her Las Vegas residency show A New Day... (2003–2007), her Taking Chances World Tour (2008–2009), and her second Las Vegas residency show Celine (2011–2019). She also performed it during her one-night concert "Une seule fois" at Sur les plaines d'Abraham in Quebec City on July 27, 2013, as well as during her European Tour 2013, her Summer Tour 2016, Live 2017 and Live 2018 tours, Courage World Tour, and most recently on her Paris 2026–2027 residency. Dion also performed it at her BST Hyde Park concert in London on July 5, 2019. She sang it again for the 20th anniversary of Titanic at the 2017 Billboard Music Awards.

== Accolades ==
"My Heart Will Go On" received numerous awards from major award-giving bodies worldwide. It won the 1998 Academy Award for Best Original Song. It dominated the 1999 Grammy Awards, winning Record of the Year — the first time the award was won by a Canadian — Song of the Year, Best Female Pop Vocal Performance, and Best Song Written Specifically for a Motion Picture or Television. It also won the Golden Globe Award for Best Original Song at the 1998 ceremony. It was also nominated for Best Song for a Movie at the 1998 MTV Movie Awards.

Accolades
Year	Organization	Accolade	Result	Ref.
1998	Academy Awards	Best Original Song	Won	
1998	Golden Globe Awards	Best Original Song	Won	
1998	Billboard Music Awards	Soundtrack Single of the Year	Won	
1998	Las Vegas Film Critics Society Awards	Best Song	Won	
1998	MuchMusic Video Awards	Peoples Choice: Favourite Artist	Won	
1998	Satellite Awards	Best Original Song	Won	
1998	Japan Record Awards	Special Achievement Award	Won	
1999	Grammy Awards	Record of the Year	Won	
1999	Grammy Awards	Song of the Year	Won	
1999	Grammy Awards	Best Female Pop Vocal Performance	Won	
1999	Grammy Awards	Best Song Written Specifically for a Motion Picture or Television	Won	
1999	Blockbuster Entertainment Awards	Favourite song from a movie	Won	
1999	MTV Asia Awards	International Song of the Year	Won	
1999	Japan Gold Disc Award	Song of the Year	Won	
2002	Billboard Latin Music Awards	Special Award	Won	
2012	VH1's Definitive list	100 Greatest Songs from the 90s	Included	

The song won a Japanese Gold Disc Award for Song of the Year, as well as a Billboard Music Award for Soundtrack Single of the Year. It also won International Song of the Year at the MTV Asia Awards in 1999.

It has been named one of the Songs of the Century. It is one of the best-selling singles ever in the United Kingdom, and the second single by Dion to sell over a million copies there. This made her one of only two female artists to have released two million-selling singles in Britain. In December 2007, the song was placed at number 21 on VH1's "100 Greatest Songs of the 90's". In April 2010, the UK radio station Magic 105.4 voted the single the "top movie song of all time" after listeners' votes. It was ranked at number 14 on AFI's 100 Years...100 Songs, celebrating the 100 greatest songs in American film history.

== Cultural impact ==
"My Heart Will Go On" became "imprinted on the movie's legacy", with each listen prompting a reminder of the blockbuster and the hype surrounding it. USA Today said it would remain tied to Titanic. The Washington Post argued that the combination of music and imagery makes both the song and the film greater than the sum of their parts.

The Los Angeles Times wrote that "My Heart Will Go On helped make 1998 an amazing year for big pop ballads". The Atlantic noted that its popularity did not come from events such as proms, weddings, or funerals, but from its constant presence in pop culture through repeated radio play and public exposure. Anne T. Donahue of TrackRecord called it "the greatest movie ballad of all time", adding that "it changed the game for movie ballads altogether, and the impact was felt immediately". MTV listed it as the sixth biggest hit of the '90s.

In New Zealand, "My Heart Will Go On", along with Dion's rendition of "The Power of Love", is popular among siren kings, a Pasifika youth subculture in South Auckland known for modified vehicle public address system competitions. The song is a staple due to the clarity of Dion's voice, which suits the audio range of public address systems. It is often played at full volume through car-mounted speakers in late-night contests to produce the loudest sound.

In the late 2010s, a pop culture trend emerged on YouTube in which the "My Heart Will Go On" key change was edited into dramatic sports moments, such as winning shots. During the COVID-19 pandemic, Barcelona pianist Alberto Gestoso performed the song for his quarantined neighbors. In 2021, the DJ at the January 6 Trump rally in Washington, D.C. played it to the crowd. The 2017 Broadway musical Come from Away interpolates "My Heart Will Go On" and uses it as a motif.

The film Barb and Star Go to Vista Del Mar (2021) included a remix of "My Heart Will Go On". Bruno Mars performed it at his first post-2020 show at MGM. Ariana Grande performed it with James Corden on The Late Late Show with James Corden. The Indie-pop band MUNA recorded an understated cover in 2023 for triple j's Like a Version, which became one of the top 10 performances of the year.

In 2024, then-presidential candidate Donald Trump used "My Heart Will Go On" at campaign rallies. Dion released a statement saying she did not endorse its use and expressed surprise at the choice. Variety wrote that it "evokes the tragedy of the Titanic and, in the film, Leonardo DiCaprio's dying character sinking to the bottom of the sea".

== Album appearances ==
The music video was included on the All the Way... A Decade of Song & Video DVD and on the Titanic (Three-Disc Special Collector's Edition) DVD released on October 25, 2005. In addition to Dion's Let's Talk About Love and the Titanic soundtrack, "My Heart Will Go On" appears on several other albums, including VH1 Divas Live, Au cœur du stade, All the Way... A Decade of Song, A New Day... Live in Las Vegas, Complete Best, My Love: Essential Collection, Taking Chances World Tour: The Concert, and Céline... une seule fois / Live 2013. It was also included on the DVDs for Au cœur du stade, All the Way... A Decade of Song & Video, Live in Las Vegas: A New Day..., and Celine: Through the Eyes of the World.

It was later included on the Back to Titanic second soundtrack album, but it does not appear on the 20th anniversary edition. In France, "My Heart Will Go On" was released as a double A-side single with "The Reason". In the Let's Talk About Love album booklet, the printed lyrics contain an additional line between the second chorus and the final verse. The words "There is some love that will not go away" are not performed by Dion in any available version, but they remain included on her official site.

== Formats and track listing ==
=== Singles ===
- European CD single
1. "My Heart Will Go On" – 4:40
2. "Because You Loved Me" – 4:33
- European CD single (remix)
1. "My Heart Will Go On" – 4:40
2. "My Heart Will Go On" (Tony Moran mix) – 4:21
- French CD single (double A-side)
1. "The Reason" – 5:01
2. "My Heart Will Go On" – 4:40
- French CD single
1. "My Heart Will Go On" – 4:40
2. "Southampton" – 4:02
- Japanese 3-inch CD single
1. "My Heart Will Go On" – 4:40
2. "Beauty and the Beast" – 4:04
- UK cassette single
1. "My Heart Will Go On" – 4:40
2. "I Love You" – 5:30
- US cassette and CD single
1. "My Heart Will Go On" – 4:40
2. "Rose" – 2:52

=== Maxi-singles ===
- Australian, Brazilian, European, and UK CD single
1. "My Heart Will Go On" – 4:40
2. "Because You Loved Me" – 4:33
3. "When I Fall in Love" – 4:19
4. "Beauty and the Beast" – 4:04
- Australian CD single (remixes)
1. "My Heart Will Go On" (Tony Moran mix) – 4:21
2. "My Heart Will Go On" (Richie Jones mix) – 4:15
3. "My Heart Will Go On" (Soul Solution mix) – 4:18
4. "Misled" (the serious mix) – 7:22
5. "Love Can Move Mountains" (underground vocal mix) – 7:14
- Brazilian CD single (remixes)
1. "My Heart Will Go On" (Cuca's radio edit) – 4:22
2. "My Heart Will Go On" (Tony Moran's anthem edit) – 4:21
3. "My Heart Will Go On" (Richie Jones "unsinkable" edit) – 4:15
4. "My Heart Will Go On" (Tony Moran's anthem vocal) – 9:41
- European 12-inch and CD single (remixes)
1. "My Heart Will Go On" – 4:40
2. "My Heart Will Go On" (Tony Moran mix) – 4:21
3. "My Heart Will Go On" (Richie Jones mix) – 4:15
4. "My Heart Will Go On" (Soul Solution mix) – 4:18
- Japanese CD single (remixes)
1. "My Heart Will Go On" (Tony Moran mix) – 4:21
2. "My Heart Will Go On" (Richie Jones mix) – 4:16
3. "My Heart Will Go On" (Soul Solution mix) – 4:19
4. "My Heart Will Go On" (Richie Jones "unsinkable" club mix) – 10:03
5. "My Heart Will Go On" (Matt & Vito's "unsinkable" epic mix) – 9:52
- UK CD single ("Heart")
1. "My Heart Will Go On" (soundtrack version) – 5:07
2. "Have a Heart" – 4:12
3. "Nothing Broken but My Heart" – 5:55
4. "Where Does My Heart Beat Now" – 4:32

== Remixes ==
1. "My Heart Will Go On" (Tony Moran mix) – 4:21
2. "My Heart Will Go On" (Tony Moran's anthem vocal) – 9:41
3. "My Heart Will Go On" (Richie Jones mix) – 4:15
4. "My Heart Will Go On" (Richie Jones "go on" beats) – 5:12
5. "My Heart Will Go On" (Richie Jones "unsinkable" club mix) – 10:03
6. "My Heart Will Go On" (Soul Solution mix) – 4:18
7. "My Heart Will Go On" (Soul Solution percappella) – 4:16
8. "My Heart Will Go On" (Soul Solution bonus beats) – 3:32
9. "My Heart Will Go On" (Soul Solution drama at sea mix) – 9:10
10. "My Heart Will Go On" (Matt & Vito's "unsinkable" epic mix) – 9:52
11. "My Heart Will Go On" (Matt & Vito's penny whistle dub) – 3:21
12. "My Heart Will Go On" (Cuca's radio edit) – 4:22

== Personnel ==
- Celine Dion – vocals
- Walter Afanasieff – arrangements, keyboards, drum programmer, Hammond B-3 Organ, synth bass, producer
- Tawatha Agee – background vocals
- Skyler Jett – background vocals
- Leslie Ellis – background vocals
- Jeanie Tracy – background vocals
- Konesha Owens – background vocals
- Claytoven Richardson – background vocals
- Lillias White – background vocals
- LaChanze – background vocals
- Roz Ryan – background vocals
- Cheryl Freeman – background vocals
- Vanéese Y. Thomas – background vocals
- William Ross – composer
- Tony Hinnigan – tin whistle
- Paul Peabody – Irish fiddle
- Dan Shea – keyboards, drum and computer programmer, sound designer
- Dann Huff – guitar
- David Gleeson – recording engineering
- Humberto Gatica – recording engineering
- Chris Brooke – assistant engineer
- Ethan Schofer – assistant engineer
- Glen Marchese – assistant engineer
- Greg Thompson – assistant engineer
- Tony Gonzalez – assistant engineer
- Tyson Leeper – assistant engineer
- Emile Charlap – contractor
- James Horner – music, producer
- Will Jennings – lyrics
- Simon Franglen – producer

== Charts ==
=== Weekly charts ===
Weekly chart performance
Chart (1997–1998)	Peak position
Australia (ARIA)	1
Austria (Ö3 Austria Top 40)	1
Belgium (Ultratop 50 Flanders)	1
Belgium (Ultratop 50 Wallonia)	1
Canada Top Singles (RPM)	1
Canada Adult Contemporary (RPM)	1
Canada Contemporary Hit Radio (BDS)	1
Canada Singles (SoundScan) Import-only single	33
Canada Singles (SoundScan) Import-only single (Remixes)	14
Costa Rica (Notimex)	1
Denmark (Tracklisten)	1
El Salvador (Notimex)	1
Europe (European Hot 100 Singles)	1
Finland (Suomen virallinen lista)	1
France (SNEP)	1
Germany (GfK)	1
Greece (IFPI)	1
Guatemala (Notimex)	1
Honduras (Notimex)	1
Hungary (Single Top 40)	1
Hungary (Rádiós Top 40)	1
Iceland (Íslenski Listinn Topp 40)	1
Ireland (IRMA)	1
Italy (FIMI)	1
Italy Airplay (Music & Media)	3
Japan (Oricon) 2-track single	34
Japan (Oricon) 5-track Dance Mixes	49
Mexico (AMPROFON)	1
Netherlands (Dutch Top 40)	1
Netherlands (Single Top 100)	1
New Zealand (Recorded Music NZ)	34
Norway (VG-lista)	1
Peru (Notimex)	1
Poland Airplay (Music & Media)	4
Puerto Rico (Notimex)	3
Quebec Radio Songs (ADISQ)	1
Scottish Singles Sales (Official Charts)	1
Spain (PROMUSICAE)	1
Sweden (Sverigetopplistan)	1
Switzerland (Schweizer Hitparade)	1
Taiwan (IFPI)	1
UK Singles (Official Charts)	1
UK Airplay (Music Week)	4
US Billboard Hot 100	1
US Adult Contemporary (Billboard)	1
US Adult Pop Airplay (Billboard)	3
US Hot Latin Songs (Billboard)	1
US Pop Airplay (Billboard)	1
US Rhythmic Airplay (Billboard)	3

=== Year-end charts ===
Year-end chart performance
Chart (1998)	Position
Australia (ARIA)	14
Austria (Ö3 Austria Top 40)	2
Belgium (Ultratop 50 Flanders)	1
Belgium (Ultratop 50 Wallonia)	2
Canada Top Singles (RPM)	3
Canada Adult Contemporary (RPM)	1
Europe (European Hot 100 Singles)	1
France (SNEP)	3
Germany (Media Control)	1
Iceland (Íslenski Listinn Topp 40)	2
Italy (Musica e dischi)	4
Netherlands (Dutch Top 40)	1
Netherlands (Single Top 100)	1
Norway Spring Period (VG-lista)	1
Spain (AFYVE)	7
Sweden (Hitlistan)	1
Switzerland (Schweizer Hitparade)	1
UK Singles (OCC)	2
US Billboard Hot 100	13
US Adult Contemporary (Billboard)	5
US Adult Top 40 (Billboard)	26
US Hot Latin Tracks (Billboard)	12
US Hot Soundtrack Singles (Billboard)	1
US Mainstream Top 40 (Billboard)	10
US Rhythmic Top 40 (Billboard)	18

=== Decade-end charts ===
Decade-end chart performance
Chart (1990–1999)	Position
Austria (Ö3 Austria Top 40)	18
Belgium (Ultratop 50 Flanders)	21
Canada (Canadian Artists Digital Songs)	3
Netherlands (Dutch Top 40)	8
UK Singles (OCC)	11

=== All-time charts ===
All-time chart performance
Chart	Position
Belgium (Ultratop 50 Flanders)	95
Canada (Nielsen SoundScan)	8
Dutch Love Songs (Dutch Top 40)	11
Ireland (IRMA)	13
UK Singles (OCC)	32

== Certifications and sales ==
Certifications
Region	Certification	Certified units/sales
Australia (ARIA)	2× Platinum	140,000^{^}
Austria (IFPI Austria)	Gold	25,000^{*}
Belgium (BRMA)	3× Platinum	150,000^{*}
Canada (Music Canada)	4× Platinum	320,000^{‡}
Denmark (IFPI Danmark)	Platinum	90,000^{‡}
France (SNEP)	Diamond	750,000^{*}
Germany (BVMI)	4× Platinum	2,000,000^{^}
Italy (FIMI)	Gold	25,000^{*}
Japan (RIAJ) Single version	2× Platinum	200,000^{^}
Japan (RIAJ) Dance mixes	Gold	100,000^{^}
Japan (RIAJ) Ringtone	Platinum	250,000^{*}
Mexico (AMPROFON)	Gold	30,000^{*}
Netherlands (NVPI)	2× Platinum	150,000^{^}
New Zealand (RMNZ)	2× Platinum	60,000^{‡}
Norway (IFPI Norway)	2× Platinum	
Spain (Promusicae)	Gold	30,000^{‡}
Sweden (GLF)	5× Platinum	150,000^{^}
Switzerland (IFPI Switzerland)	2× Platinum	100,000^{^}
United Kingdom (BPI)	4× Platinum	2,400,000^{‡}
United States (RIAA)	4× Platinum	4,000,000^{‡}
Summaries
Worldwide	—	18,000,000
^{*} Sales figures based on certification alone.^{^} Shipments figures based on certification alone.^{‡} Sales+streaming figures based on certification alone.

== Release history ==
Release history
Region	Date	Format	Label	Ref.
DACH	November 24, 1997	CD	Columbia	
United States	December 1997	Radio airplay	Epic	
Belgium	January 5, 1998	CD	Columbia	
Japan	January 14, 1998	3-inch CD	SMEJ	
United Kingdom	February 9, 1998	Cassette; CD	Epic	
United States	February 10, 1998	Cassette; CD	Epic	
Japan	June 20, 1998	CD	SMEJ	

== See also ==
- Academy Award for Best Original Song
- French Top 100 singles of the 1990s
- Golden Globe Award for Best Original Song
- Grammy Award for Best Female Pop Vocal Performance
- Grammy Award for Best Song Written for Visual Media
- Grammy Award for Record of the Year
- Grammy Award for Song of the Year
- List of artists who have achieved simultaneous UK and U.S. number-one hits
- List of Australian chart achievements and milestones
- List of best-selling singles
- List of best-selling singles in France
- List of best-selling singles in Germany
- List of best-selling singles in the United Kingdom
- List of best-selling singles of the 1990s in the United Kingdom
- List of Billboard Hot 100 chart achievements and milestones
- List of Billboard Hot 100 number-one singles of the 1990s
- List of Billboard Mainstream Top 40 number-one songs of the 1990s
- List of million-selling singles in the United Kingdom
- List of number-one hits (Germany)
- List of number-one singles and albums in Sweden
- List of number-one singles in Australia during the 1990s
- List of number-one singles of the 1990s (Switzerland)
- List of number-one songs in Norway
- List of UK singles chart number ones of the 1990s

== Works cited ==
- Rapkin, Mickey (May 18, 2017). "The Oral History of Celine Dion's 'My Heart Will Go On': Controversies, Doubts & 'Belly Pains' in the Studio". Billboard. Billboard.
