= Taking Chances World Tour =

2008–2009 concert tour by Celine Dion

- World tour by Celine Dion
- Promotional poster for the tour
- Location: South Africa; Asia; Australia; Europe; North America
- Associated album: Taking Chances
- Start date: 14 February 2008
- End date: 26 February 2009
- No. of shows: 131
- Box office: US$279.2 million ($418.99 million in 2025 dollars)

Celine Dion concert chronology
- A New Day... (2003–2007); Taking Chances World Tour (2008–2009); Celine (2011–2019)

The Taking Chances World Tour was the tenth concert tour by Canadian singer Celine Dion, organized to support her tenth English‑language studio album, Taking Chances (2007). The tour marked Dion's return to major international stages following five years of her successful Las Vegas residency, A New Day..., and was her first worldwide tour since the Let's Talk About Love World Tour (1998–1999). It opened in South Africa before continuing through Asia and Australia, then moved to Europe for a two‑and‑a‑half‑month run, and concluded with a six‑month North American leg that also included dates in Mexico and Puerto Rico. The tour grossed US$279.2 million overall, with $236.6 million earned in 2008 and $42.6 million in 2009. It was the second highest‑grossing tour of 2008 and ranked seventh among the most successful concert tours of the 2000s.

== Background and development ==
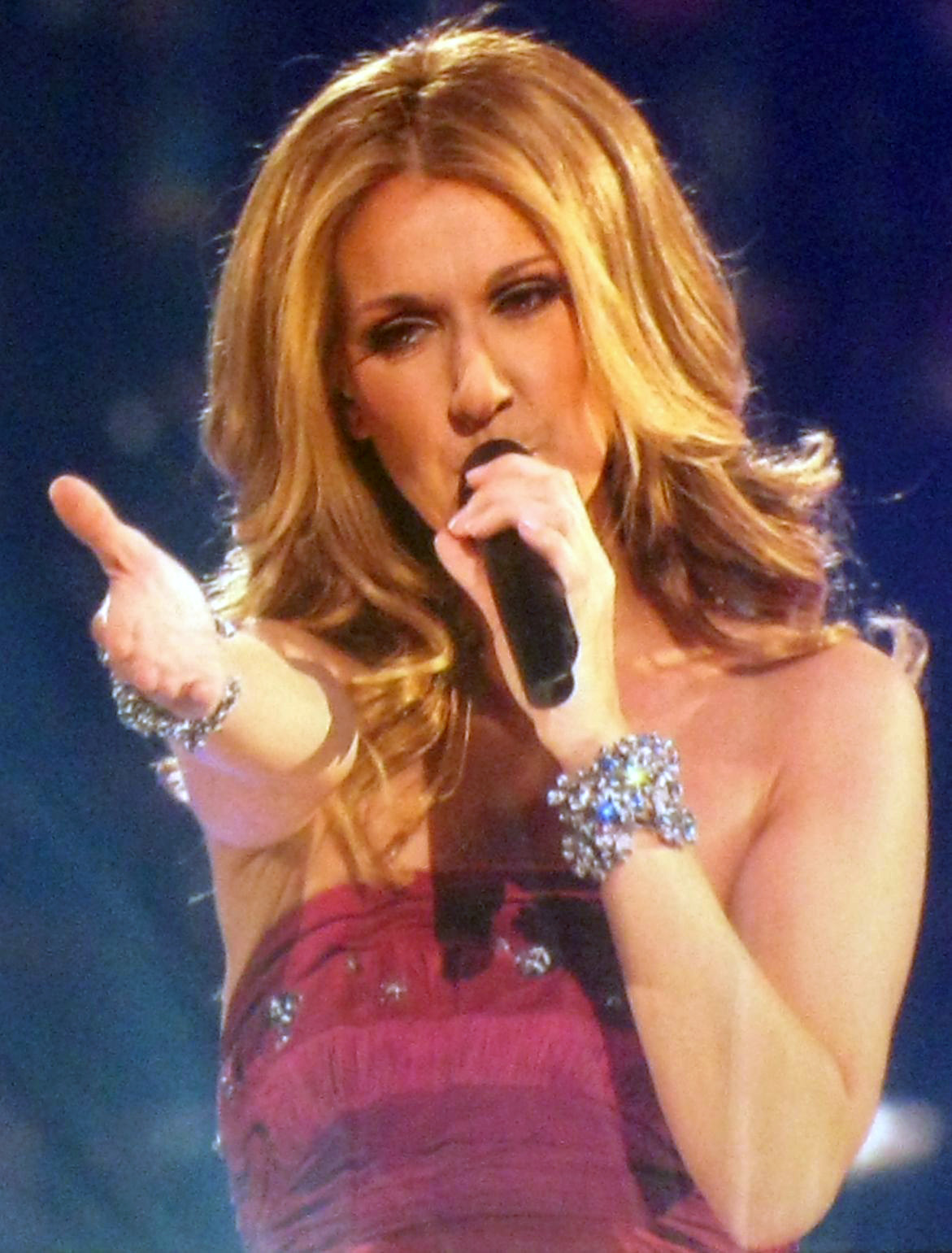
Dion performing "Taking Chances" in Montreal

The show, directed by Jamie King—known for his work with Madonna—combined Dion's performances with elaborate staging, fashion elements and choreography. The set included many of her best‑known songs as well as material from her English‑language album Taking Chances. The two‑hour production was divided into four thematic segments—soul, rock, Middle Eastern‑inspired and "fashion‑victim"—and included eight dancers. Rehearsals took place in December 2007 in Primm, Nevada, and at the MGM Grand in Las Vegas.

The technical setup incorporated 20 LED screens, one of which moved above the stage, along with catwalks, conveyor belts, elevators and ramps. Dion also recorded several video sequences for use during the show. The opening film depicted her driving at high speed to a remix of "I Drove All Night". Two versions of this introduction were created: an early one highlighting moments from her career, used in South Africa, Asia, Australia and some European dates, and a later version showing footage from cities visited on the tour. Another montage presented Dion in various fashion styles over the years, accompanied by a remix of "My Heart Will Go On".

King rejoined the production on 2 May 2008 in Manchester, England. Prior to that, the show was not staged in the round (except in Japan) due to logistical constraints. After two and a half months on the road, Dion rehearsed again to refine the performance for the central‑stage configuration. Because of her bilingual repertoire and the limitations of certain venues, King developed three distinct versions of the show. One was an English‑language, in‑the‑round production using the full system of mobile screens and stage machinery. A second, also staged centrally, incorporated ten of her most popular French‑language songs for Francophone audiences. A third, simplified version was created for arenas where the central stage could not be installed; these performances used an end‑stage layout with a large central screen and an expanded lighting design. Before the European leg, both the central‑ and end‑stage versions were finalized and reconfigured to ensure compatibility across venues. New costumes debuted at the start of the European shows.

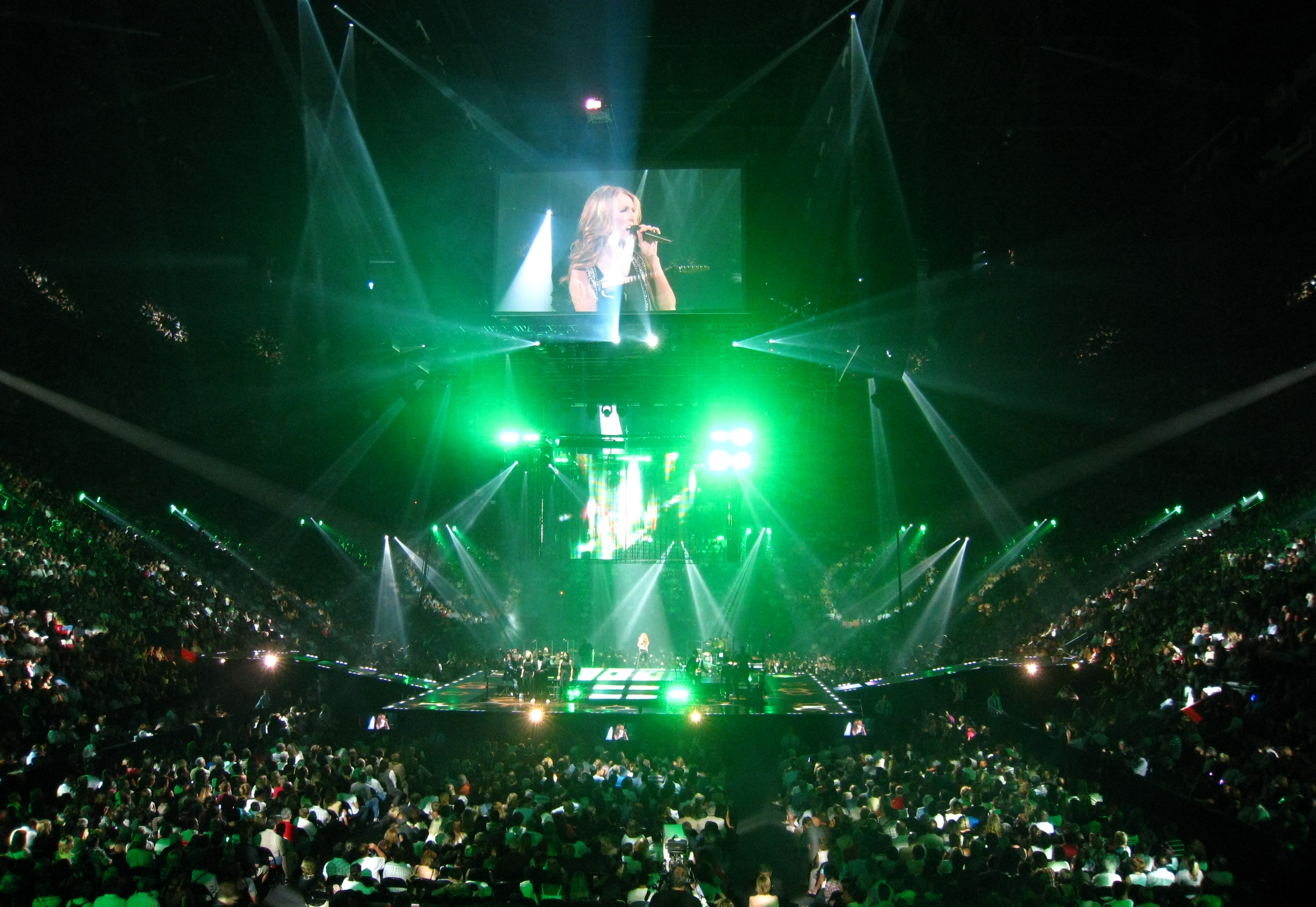
Dion's in‑the‑round staging used for arenas in Europe and North America

Dion and her band rehearsed approximately 60 songs in English and French, from which about 27 were selected for performance depending on the market. "Pour que tu m'aimes encore", one of her most successful French‑language singles, was included throughout the tour; the song had set records in the 1990s as the best‑selling French‑language single of all time and one of the few French songs to chart widely outside Francophone regions. Dion also performed several cover songs, including James Brown's "I Got the Feelin'" and "It's a Man's Man's Man's World", and Queen's "We Will Rock You" and "The Show Must Go On", though the Queen songs were removed after the 27 October show in Winnipeg. She also performed Kiki Dee's "I've Got the Music in Me", which was dropped after the concert in South Korea.

When the tour reached Dion's home province of Quebec, she performed eight sold‑out shows in Montreal and two in Quebec City. Although not officially part of the tour, Dion also gave a free concert on 22 August 2008 for an audience of 250,000 at the Plains of Abraham during the celebrations of the 400th anniversary of Quebec City. The French‑language performance included numerous guest appearances. The event was broadcast live on Bell Satellite TV and viewed by more than 200,000 people at home.

== Broadcasts and recordings ==
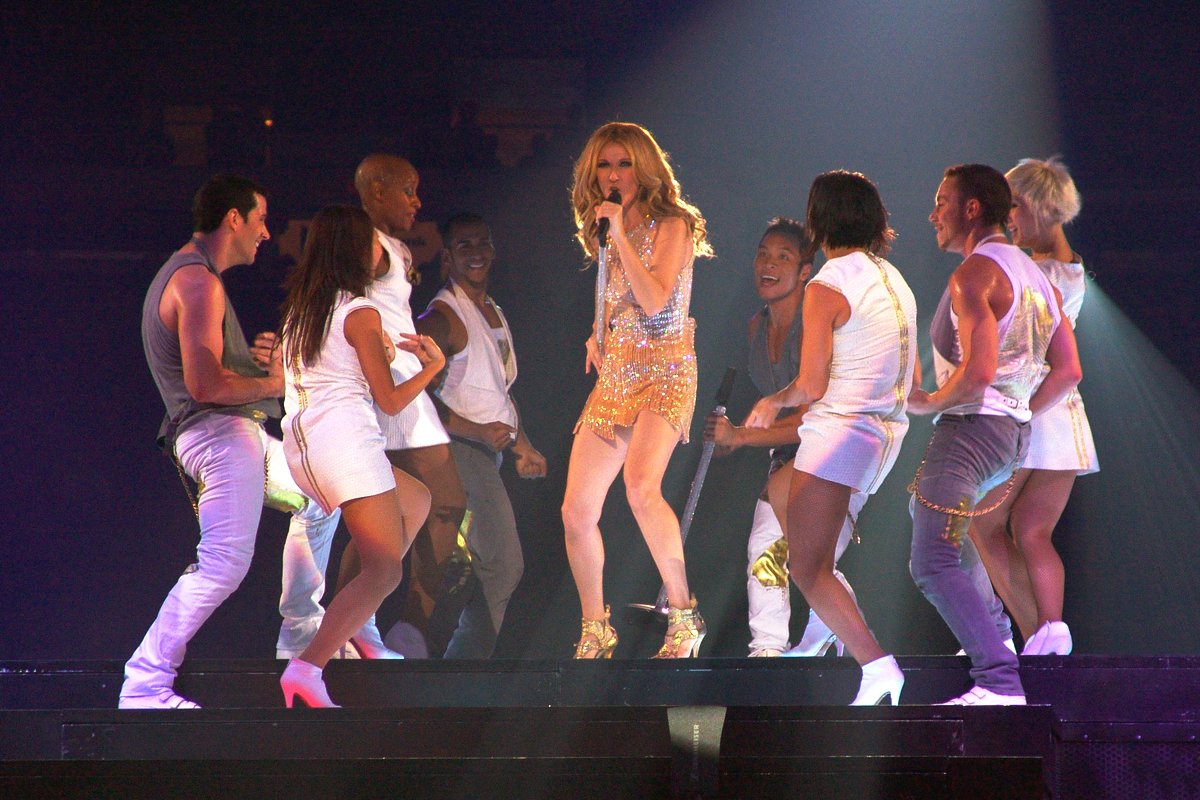
Dion performing "River Deep, Mountain High" in Uniondale

On 22 August 2008, the City of Lévis broadcast Dion's honorary concert for Quebec City's 400th anniversary online and on television. The event attracted an audience of 250,000 people. On 31 August 2008, a special performance of "My Love" aired during the Jerry Lewis MDA Telethon. The telethon performance was later used as the official music video for the single.

An official tour photo book, Celine autour du monde, was released on 24 September 2009 in Quebec and France. The 368‑page volume includes 485 photographs by Gérard Schachmes, presenting images from concerts, backstage moments, and Dion's travels. It also includes photos of her family, the tour crew, dancers, singers, musicians and technicians, as well as scenes from locations such as the River Thames, an African safari, and early‑morning stage preparations in New York. The book was released in Canada on 14 October 2009, with editions for the United States and Japan planned.

The tour was documented in the film Celine: Through the Eyes of the World, which follows Dion on stage, behind the scenes and during personal moments with her family. The documentary was released on DVD and Blu‑ray on 11 May 2010.

Taking Chances World Tour: The Concert was also released on 11 May 2010. It includes a DVD and live CD of the English‑ and French‑language setlists (issued separately). The English recordings were made in Boston on 12–13 August 2008, while the French recordings were captured in Montreal on 31 August and 1 September 2008. A deluxe edition includes both DVDs, a 52‑page booklet and fold‑out souvenir postcards.

== Commercial reception ==
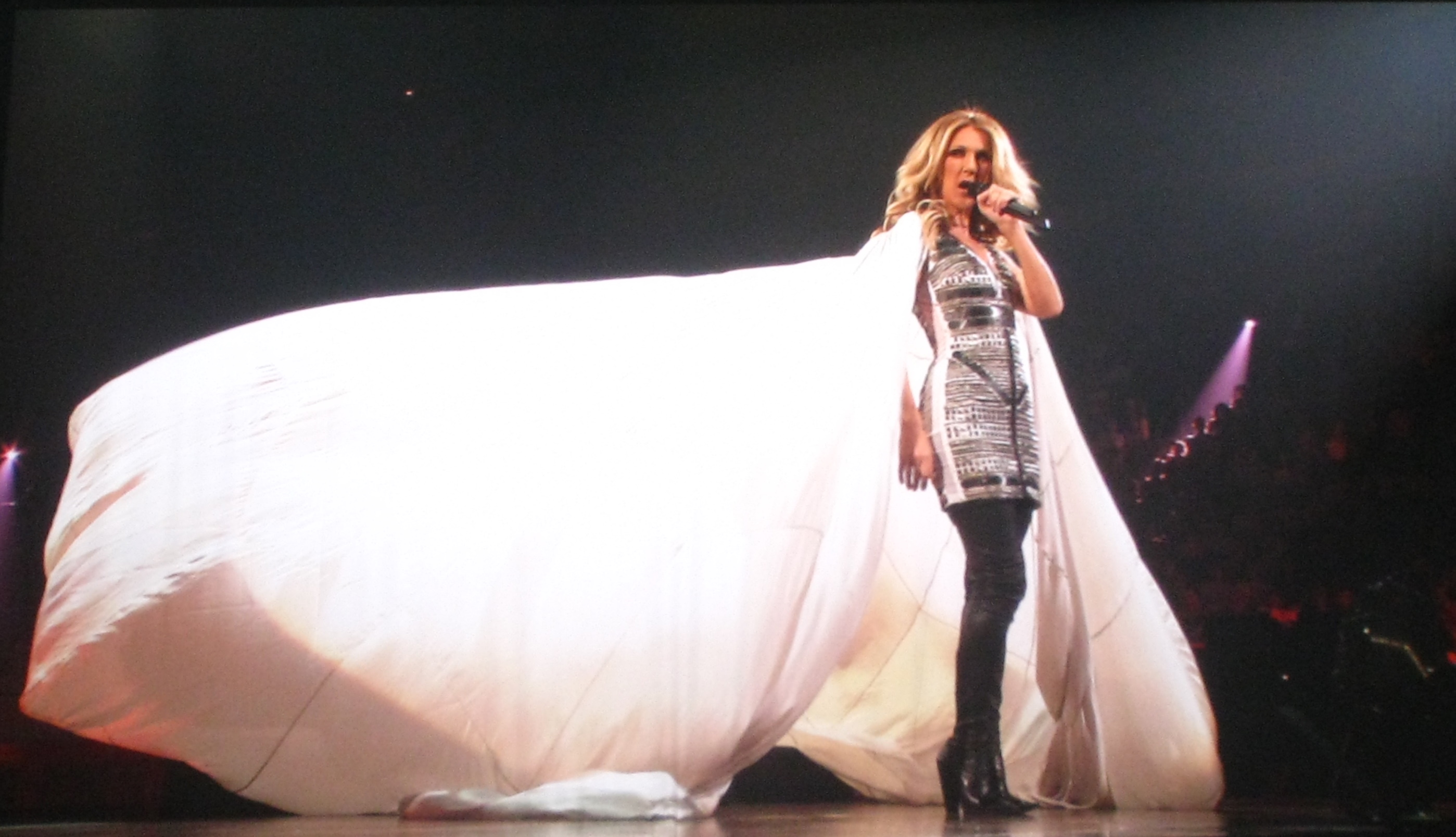
Dion performing "Eyes on Me" in Montreal

The tour achieved major commercial success worldwide, generating a total gross of US$279.2 million—US$236.6 million in 2008 and an additional US$42.6 million in 2009. These earnings placed it among the highest‑grossing concert tours of its time, ranking second globally in 2008 and later appearing seventh on the list of the most successful concert tours of the 2000s.

Dion set a Canadian concert record when all her Montreal shows sold out within minutes. After additional dates were added, bringing the total to 11, Montreal became the tour's largest market, drawing an average of 20,995 attendees per show and a combined total of 227,616 spectators. By that time, Dion had appeared at the Bell Centre 31 times since 1996.

Other Canadian dates also sold out rapidly, leading to second shows in Edmonton, Vancouver, and Winnipeg, and a third in Toronto. In the United States, extra dates were added in New York, Uniondale, Boston, and Newark. In Ireland, 64,000 tickets for her Dublin concert—the largest single show of the tour—sold out in three hours.

Dion also sold out stadium concerts in South Africa, the Netherlands (50,000 attendees), and Denmark (42,000). A second date was added in Sydney following strong demand. On 22 August 2008, Dion performed a free concert on the Plains of Abraham as part of the 400th anniversary of Quebec City, attracting an estimated 250,000 attendees.

Dion's 7 February 2008 concert at The Colosseum at Caesars Windsor sold out in 15 minutes, with more than 125 fans queuing overnight for tickets. Her performance at the Sprint Center in Kansas City became the arena's highest‑grossing concert at the time, earning $1,661,827, a record later surpassed by Elton John and Billy Joel. Her Miami concert at the American Airlines Arena set an attendance record with 17,725 tickets sold. Although Britney Spears surpassed that attendance two months later, Dion's concert grossed $2,247,233 compared with Spears's $1,972,928.

Dion became the top‑selling performer for three venues: Montreal's Bell Centre, Kansas City's Sprint Center, and the New Orleans Arena, where her concert grossed $1,829,331. Her 2008 Bell Centre shows ranked second on Billboard's Top 25 Boxscores list.

== Critical reception ==
The concerts received mixed reviews from critics. Diane Coetzer of Billboard wrote that Dion's first performance in South Africa "may not have ultimately succeeded in presenting her as a multi-faceted performer, but it definitely confirmed that Dion is a singer of unparalleled ability. Performing in a stadium that ordinarily holds rugby fans and flanked by two huge screens, Dion used her astonishing voice to captivate the near-capacity crowd". Coetzer praised the choreography and visual production, but felt that the inclusion of soul covers and songs by Queen created an awkward shift in tone until the finale, when "My Heart Will Go On" was performed.

Jon Caramanica of the New York Times observed that Dion "showed off a few new tricks without violating her core tenets of scale and pomp". However, he described some material, including "My Love", as "a technical exercise, a singer practicing her vocal workout in front of thousands of people". The Independent gave the London concert a negative review, awarding it two stars out of five and stating, "Many singers perform in their second language and manage to sound convincing. Despite selling a reported 200 million albums – including 27 million copies of that Titanic soundtrack – Céline Dion is not one of them".

Randy Lewis of the Los Angeles Times offered a more enthusiastic assessment, writing that the tour was becoming "one of the highest-grossing North American concert attractions of 2008" and praising Dion's ability to deliver "emotional climax after emotional climax" supported by extensive production elements. He noted that despite the show's technical polish, Dion allowed "her human side" to emerge between songs, which he felt balanced the more elaborate arrangements. Lewis also drew attention to the focus on new material and the strong support from her band, backing vocalists, and dancers. As in Coetzer's review, the soul covers were viewed less favorably.

Sarah Rodman of the Boston Globe responded positively, writing that "there was never a dearth of stimulation", citing costume changes, lighting, video elements, and the use of dancers. She concluded that even when the material was not as strong, Dion's performance remained compelling.

CTV News praised Dion's Montreal performance, noting her characteristic stage mannerisms and the enthusiastic response from fans. The outlet described the concert as a significant return to touring after her five-year Las Vegas residency, with audiences showing strong engagement throughout the show.

Much of the critical divide centered on Dion's updated stage persona following her Las Vegas residency. Dave Simpson of The Guardian awarded the Manchester concert three stars out of five, commenting that during her touring hiatus "Dion has clearly been abducted by aliens and replaced by CelineBarbie", referring to her more stylized choreography, flirtatious stage presence, and reinterpretations of rock and pop material. Sun Media gave the Toronto concert 3.5 stars out of 5, questioning whether Dion was truly "taking chances" and describing her as "basically Vegas personified". Conversely, The Vancouver Sun praised the show's staging and noted Dion's efforts to interact with the audience, while questioning the extent to which such gestures could genuinely "humanize" a performer with such a devoted fanbase.

== Opening act ==
- Jody Williams (South Africa)
- Yuna Ito (Japan)
- Anthony Callea (Australia)
- Michaël Gregorio (Europe, select dates)
- Arno Carstens (England)
- Il Divo (Ireland)
- Jon Mesek (Germany, Austria)
- The Storys (Netherlands)
- Nordstrøm (Denmark)
- Calaisa (Sweden, Finland)
- Lenka Filipová (Czech Republic)
- Natalia Lesz (Poland)
- Gordie Brown (North America, select dates)
- Véronic DiCaire (Montreal and Quebec)

== Tour dates ==
List of 2008 concerts (Note: The 2008 North American box office figures are sourced from Billboard reports for September 2008, October 2008, and November 2008.)
Date (2008)	City	Country	Venue	Attendance	Revenue
14 February (Note: This concert was held in support of the Nelson Mandela Children's Fund.)	Johannesburg	South Africa	Coca-Cola Dome	—N/a	—N/a
16 February	Pretoria	South Africa	Loftus Versfeld Stadium	59,100 / 91,200	$4,176,510
17 February	Pretoria	South Africa	Loftus Versfeld Stadium	59,100 / 91,200	$4,176,510
20 February	Durban	South Africa	ABSA Stadium	36,973 / 36,973	$1,779,549
23 February	Cape Town	South Africa	Great Lawn at Vergelegen	53,328 / 68,000	$3,930,963
24 February	Cape Town	South Africa	Great Lawn at Vergelegen	53,328 / 68,000	$3,930,963
27 February	Port Elizabeth	South Africa	EPRU Stadium	17,310 / 28,500	$902,836
29 February (Note: Originally scheduled for 28 February 2008 at the Coca-Cola Dome.)	Johannesburg	South Africa	Montecasino	20,987 / 23,000	$2,481,897
1 March	Johannesburg	South Africa	Montecasino	20,987 / 23,000	$2,481,897
5 March	Dubai	United Arab Emirates	Four Seasons Golf Club	7,873 / 19,400	$1,487,185
8 March	Tokyo	Japan	Tokyo Dome	95,150 / 100,000	$11,226,594
9 March	Tokyo	Japan	Tokyo Dome	95,150 / 100,000	$11,226,594
11 March	Osaka	Japan	Osaka Dome	58,756 / 60,000	$6,699,627
12 March	Osaka	Japan	Osaka Dome	58,756 / 60,000	$6,699,627
15 March	Macau		Venetian Arena	10,475 / 10,475	$1,996,842
18 March	Seoul	South Korea	Olympic Gymnastics Arena	11,387 / 21,788	$1,843,776
19 March	Seoul	South Korea	Olympic Gymnastics Arena	11,387 / 21,788	$1,843,776
31 March (Note: Originally scheduled for 26 March 2008.)	Brisbane	Australia	Brisbane Entertainment Centre	7,835 / 13,156	$1,719,321
2 April (Note: Originally scheduled for 1 April 2008.)	Melbourne	Australia	Rod Laver Arena	12,266 / 15,431	$2,314,928
5 April (Note: Originally scheduled for 28 March 2008.)	Sydney	Australia	Acer Arena	20,605 / 21,752	$4,176,200
6 April (Note: Originally scheduled for 29 March 2008.)	Sydney	Australia	Acer Arena	20,605 / 21,752	$4,176,200
8 April (Note: Originally scheduled for 4 April 2008.)	Perth	Australia	Members Equity Stadium	10,086 / 15,613	$1,648,288
11 April	Shanghai	China	Shanghai Stadium	22,579 / 30,198	$2,699,898
13 April (Note: Originally scheduled for 8 April 2008.)	Kuala Lumpur	Malaysia	Stadium Merdeka	8,638 / 11,258	$1,046,730
2 May	Manchester	England	Manchester Evening News Arena	36,031 / 36,031	$5,339,056
3 May	Manchester	England	Manchester Evening News Arena	36,031 / 36,031	$5,339,056
6 May	London	England	The O_{2} Arena	37,445 / 38,300	$5,104,817
8 May	London	England	The O_{2} Arena	37,445 / 38,300	$5,104,817
10 May	Birmingham	England	National Indoor Arena	12,108 / 12,432	$2,091,437
13 May	Antwerp	Belgium	Sportpaleis	45,352 / 46,955	$7,619,814
14 May	Antwerp	Belgium	Sportpaleis	45,352 / 46,955	$7,619,814
16 May	Antwerp	Belgium	Sportpaleis	45,352 / 46,955	$7,619,814
19 May	Paris	France	Palais Omnisports de Paris-Bercy	73,555 / 83,148	$17,193,013
20 May	Paris	France	Palais Omnisports de Paris-Bercy	73,555 / 83,148	$17,193,013
21 May	Paris	France	Palais Omnisports de Paris-Bercy	73,555 / 83,148	$17,193,013
24 May	Paris	France	Palais Omnisports de Paris-Bercy	73,555 / 83,148	$17,193,013
25 May	Paris	France	Palais Omnisports de Paris-Bercy	73,555 / 83,148	$17,193,013
27 May	Paris	France	Palais Omnisports de Paris-Bercy	73,555 / 83,148	$17,193,013
30 May	Dublin	Ireland	Croke Park	61,746 / 61,746	$8,650,493
2 June	Amsterdam	Netherlands	Amsterdam Arena	46,969 / 52,772	$4,565,126
5 June	Copenhagen	Denmark	Parken Stadium	39,071 / 39,360	$5,089,936
7 June	Stockholm	Sweden	Stockholm Globe Arena	14,817 / 14,817	$2,428,840
9 June	Helsinki	Finland	Hartwall Arena	13,348 / 13,348	$3,108,811
12 June	Berlin	Germany	Waldbühne	13,153 / 14,000	$1,826,671
14 June	Frankfurt	Germany	Commerzbank-Arena	15,333 / 18,000	$2,206,722
16 June	Stuttgart	Germany	Hanns-Martin-Schleyer-Halle	5,692 / 7,000	$1,274,927
18 June	Cologne	Germany	Lanxess Arena	9,657 / 10,000	$1,914,513
20 June	Hamburg	Germany	Color Line Arena	8,757 / 9,500	$2,023,846
22 June	Munich	Germany	Olympiastadion	17,015 / 20,000	$2,414,114
24 June	Zürich	Switzerland	Hallenstadion	11,005 / 11,005	$2,246,343
26 June	Prague	Czech Republic	O_{2} Arena	13,923 / 18,000	$1,222,912
28 June	Kraków	Poland	Błonia Park	12,755 / 15,000	$1,733,229
1 July	Vienna	Austria	Wiener Stadthalle	9,518 / 10,000	$2,519,748
3 July (Note: Originally scheduled to take place at San Siro.)	Milan	Italy	DatchForum	—N/a	—N/a
5 July	Nice	France	Stade Charles-Ehrmann	23,865 / 24,000	$4,198,510
7 July (Note: This concert was part of the Main Square Festival.)	Arras	France	Grand-Place d'Arras	14,974 / 15,000	$1,437,735
9 July	Geneva	Switzerland	Stade de Genève	19,954 / 20,000	$4,364,730
11 July (Note: These concerts were part of the Monte-Carlo Sporting Summer Festival.)	Monte Carlo	Monaco	Salle des Etoiles	1,800 / 1,800	$1,420,236
12 July	Monte Carlo	Monaco	Salle des Etoiles	1,800 / 1,800	$1,420,236
12 August	Boston	United States	TD Banknorth Garden	32,493 / 32,493	$3,813,519
13 August	Boston	United States	TD Banknorth Garden	32,493 / 32,493	$3,813,519
15 August	Montreal	Canada	Bell Centre	227,616 / 227,616 (Note: Attendance and box office totals represent the combined figures for all shows in Montreal.)	$30,137,572
16 August	Montreal	Canada	Bell Centre	227,616 / 227,616	$30,137,572
19 August	Montreal	Canada	Bell Centre	227,616 / 227,616	$30,137,572
20 August	Montreal	Canada	Bell Centre	227,616 / 227,616	$30,137,572
23 August	Montreal	Canada	Bell Centre	227,616 / 227,616	$30,137,572
25 August	Montreal	Canada	Bell Centre	227,616 / 227,616	$30,137,572
27 August	Toronto	Canada	Air Canada Centre	54,384 / 54,384 (Note: Attendance and box office totals represent the combined figures for all shows in Toronto.)	$7,140,013
28 August	Toronto	Canada	Air Canada Centre	54,384 / 54,384	$7,140,013
31 August	Montreal	Canada	Bell Centre	—	—
1 September	Montreal	Canada	Bell Centre	—	—
3 September	Buffalo	United States	HSBC Arena	16,343 / 16,343	$1,381,696
5 September	Philadelphia	United States	Wachovia Center	18,061 / 18,061	$2,246,374
6 September	Ledyard	United States	MGM Grand Theater	—N/a	—N/a
8 September	Washington, D.C.	United States	Verizon Center	16,845 / 16,845	$2,225,458
10 September	Newark	United States	Prudential Center	31,902 / 31,902	$3,605,530
12 September	Newark	United States	Prudential Center	31,902 / 31,902	$3,605,530
13 September	Uniondale	United States	Nassau Veterans Memorial Coliseum	32,432 / 32,432 (Note: Attendance and box office totals represent the combined figures for both shows in Uniondale.)	$3,586,695
15 September	New York City	United States	Madison Square Garden	36,291 / 36,291	$4,476,480
16 September	New York City	United States	Madison Square Garden	36,291 / 36,291	$4,476,480
18 September	Uniondale	United States	Nassau Veterans Memorial Coliseum	—	—
20 September	Atlantic City	United States	Boardwalk Hall	14,590 / 14,590	$2,142,875
22 September	Columbus	United States	Value City Arena	16,986 / 16,986	$1,399,218
24 September	Cleveland	United States	Quicken Loans Arena	17,343 / 17,343	$1,486,401
26 September	Auburn Hills	United States	The Palace of Auburn Hills	19,486 / 19,486	$1,959,845
27 September	Toronto	Canada	Air Canada Centre	—	—
29 September	Milwaukee	United States	Bradley Center	17,443 / 17,443	$1,193,896
14 October	Sacramento	United States	ARCO Arena	15,213 / 15,213	$1,442,044
16 October	Portland	United States	Rose Garden	18,001 / 18,001	$1,247,473
18 October	Tacoma	United States	Tacoma Dome	20,665 / 20,665	$1,765,386
20 October	Vancouver	Canada	General Motors Place	34,348 / 34,348	$3,587,340
21 October	Vancouver	Canada	General Motors Place	34,348 / 34,348	$3,587,340
24 October	Edmonton	Canada	Rexall Place	32,958 / 32,958	$3,105,627
25 October	Edmonton	Canada	Rexall Place	32,958 / 32,958	$3,105,627
27 October	Winnipeg	Canada	MTS Centre	29,062 / 29,062	$2,586,462
28 October	Winnipeg	Canada	MTS Centre	29,062 / 29,062	$2,586,462
7 November	Ottawa	Canada	Scotiabank Place	13,531 / 13,531	$1,803,586
29 November	Anaheim	United States	Honda Center	15,587 / 15,587	$1,785,579
2 December	Los Angeles	United States	Staples Center	16,776 / 16,776	$2,157,110
6 December	Glendale	United States	Jobing.com Arena	16,283 / 16,283	$1,739,928
9 December	Mexico City	Mexico	Palacio de los Deportes	16,316 / 16,417	$1,323,694
11 December	Guadalajara	Mexico	Arena VFG	9,442 / 13,244	$936,565
13 December	Monterrey	Mexico	Arena Monterrey	11,073 / 11,073	$1,065,716
16 December (Note: Originally scheduled for 4 November 2008.)	Chicago	United States	United Center	17,191 / 17,191	$1,943,436
18 December (Note: Originally scheduled for 30 October 2008.)	Minneapolis	United States	Target Center	15,503 / 15,503	$1,814,517
21 December (Note: Originally scheduled for 9 November 2008.)	Indianapolis	United States	Conseco Fieldhouse	14,538 / 14,538	$1,154,402

List of 2009 concerts (Note: The 2008 North American box office figures are sourced from Billboard reports for January 2009, February 2009, March 2009, and June 2009.)
Date (2009)	City	Country	Venue	Attendance	Revenue
3 January (Note: Originally scheduled for 15 November 2008.)	Kansas City	United States	Sprint Center	16,106 / 16,106	$1,661,827
5 January	Dallas	United States	American Airlines Center	17,661 / 17,661	$2,161,548
7 January	San Antonio	United States	AT&T Center	12,882 / 12,882	$1,164,271
9 January	Houston	United States	Toyota Center	16,396 / 16,396	$2,225,019
10 January	New Orleans	United States	New Orleans Arena	17,006 / 17,006	$1,829,331
13 January	Nashville	United States	Sommet Center	16,352 / 16,352	$1,602,595
15 January	Birmingham	United States	BJCC Arena	14,733 / 14,733	$1,065,830
17 January	Atlanta	United States	Philips Arena	16,919 / 16,919	$2,300,783
21 January	Raleigh	United States	RBC Center	16,527 / 16,527	$1,583,500
23 January	Miami	United States	American Airlines Arena	17,725 / 17,725	$2,247,233
28 January	Tampa	United States	St. Pete Times Forum	17,909 / 17,909	$1,843,187
30 January	Sunrise	United States	BankAtlantic Center	18,147 / 18,147	$2,233,198
31 January	San Juan	Puerto Rico	Coliseo de Puerto Rico	13,812 / 13,812	$1,625,045
2 February (Note: Originally scheduled for 13 November 2008.)	Tulsa	United States	BOK Center	15,933 / 15,933	$1,570,961
4 February (Note: Originally scheduled for 11 November 2008.)	St. Louis	United States	Scottrade Center	17,283 / 17,283	$1,351,246
7 February	Windsor	Canada	The Colosseum at Caesars Windsor	1,978 / 2,656	$320,966
9 February	Quebec City	Canada	Colisée Pepsi	20,903 / 20,903	$2,941,651
10 February	Quebec City	Canada	Colisée Pepsi	20,903 / 20,903	$2,941,651
12 February	Montreal	Canada	Bell Centre	—	—
14 February	Montreal	Canada	Bell Centre	—	—
15 February	Montreal	Canada	Bell Centre	—	—
20 February (Note: Originally scheduled for 23 November 2008.)	San Jose	United States	HP Pavilion at San Jose	16,862 / 16,862	$1,897,276
22 February (Note: Originally scheduled for 19 November 2008.)	Salt Lake City	United States	EnergySolutions Arena	16,212 / 16,212	$1,245,743
24 February	Denver	United States	Pepsi Center	16,461 / 16,461	$1,413,647
26 February (Note: Originally scheduled for 17 November 2008.)	Omaha	United States	Qwest Center Arena	15,783 / 15,783	$1,260,362
Total				2,193,483 / 2,325,831 (94%)	$279,200,000

== Cancelled shows ==
List of cancelled concerts showing date, city, country, venue, and reason for cancellation
Date (2008)	City	Country	Venue	Reason
3 March	Doha	Qatar	Al-Sadd Stadium	Security concerns and illness (Auckland and San Diego)
23 March	Auckland	New Zealand	Vector Arena	Security concerns and illness (Auckland and San Diego)
13 April	Beijing	China	Workers Stadium	Security concerns and illness (Auckland and San Diego)
28 June	Istanbul	Turkey	BJK İnönü Stadium	Security concerns and illness (Auckland and San Diego)
23 August	Halifax	Canada	Halifax Common	Security concerns and illness (Auckland and San Diego)
25 November	San Diego	United States	San Diego Sports Arena	Security concerns and illness (Auckland and San Diego)

== Personnel ==
- Celine Dion – lead vocals

=== Band ===
- Claude "Mégo" Lemay – musical director, piano
- Dominique Messier – drums
- Marc Langis – bass
- André Coutu – guitars
- Jean Sebastien Carré – violin
- Yves Frulla – keyboards
- Nannette Fortier – percussion
- Julie McInnes – cello
- Élise Duguay – background vocals, cello, tin whistle
- Mary-Lou Gauthier – background vocals
- Barnev Valsaint – background vocals
- Andrew St. Pierre – background vocals
- Amanda Balen – dancer
- Melissa Garcia – dancer
- Kemba Shannon – dancer
- Addie Yungmee – dancer
- Zac Brazenas – dancer
- Joshua Figueroa – dancer
- Dominic Chaiduang – dancer
- Aaron Foelske – dancer
- Miguel Perez – dancer
- Chris Houston – dancer
- Tammy To – dancer

=== Production ===
- René Angélil – manager
- Denis Savage – tour director
- Michel Dion – tour manager (talent)
- Patrick Angélil – tour manager (production, logistics, media relations)
- Rick Mooney – production manager
- Shari Weber – assistant production manager
- Alexandre Miasnikof – stage manager
- Nick Skokos – artist's personal security
- Cindy Beaumariage – tour rigger
- Yves "Lapin" Aucoin – lighting director
- François "Frankie" Desjardins – front of house engineer
- Charles Ethier – monitor engineer
- Mario St-Onge – audio system engineer
- Marc Theriault – RF engineer
- Trevelynn Henuset DC – health services/chiropractor
- Karl Gaudreau – assistant lighting director, lighting head
- Veillet Mireille – video director
- Jeff Dubois – head back-line technician
- Guy Vignola – computer programmer, keyboard technician
- Martin Perreault – head of video
- Sharie Weber – production assistant
- Stephanie Duval – production assistant
- Sylvia Hebel – tour accountant
- Jamie King – creative director
- Jim Allison (Concerts West) – tour director
- Lonnie McKenzie – production director
- Solotech (Montreal) – lighting, audio, video vendor
- Billy Wilson – merchandiser

== See also ==
- List of highest-grossing concert tours
- List of highest-grossing concert tours by women
