= David Stenmarck =

Swedish musician

- Born: David Axel Stenmarck; 20 February 1974 (age 52); Sweden
- Origin: Stockholm
- Genres: Pop; Rock
- Occupations: Singer; Songwriter; Producer

David Axel Stenmarck (born 20 February 1974) is a Swedish musical artist, songwriter, producer and co-founder of Sweden based royalty-free soundtrack providing company Epidemic Sound.

== Career ==
Stenmarck started his career as a singer, he then started writing and producing.
