= My Love (Celine Dion song) =

Single by Celine Dion

from the album My Love: Essential Collection
- B-side: "My Love" (live version)
- Released: 23 September 2008
- Recorded: 7 June 2008
- Studio: At the Palms (Las Vegas)
- Genre: Pop
- Length: 4:09 (album / radio version); 5:07 (live version)
- Label: Columbia; Epic
- Songwriter: Linda Perry
- Producer: Linda Perry

Celine Dion singles chronology
"Alone" (2008)	"My Love" (2008)	"Parler à mon père" (2012)

Music video
- "My Love" on YouTube

"My Love" is a song recorded by Canadian singer Celine Dion. Written and produced by Linda Perry and first included on Dion's tenth English studio album, Taking Chances (2007), it was later issued as the lead single from her greatest hits album, My Love: Essential Collection (2008). The song was sent to radio on 22 September 2008 and released as a digital download the following day. A pop ballad, "My Love" received generally positive reviews from music critics, who praised its emotional delivery, and achieved moderate chart success, entering the Canadian Hot 100 and Billboard's Hot Adult Contemporary chart.

== Background and release ==
"My Love" was originally included on Dion's tenth English studio album, Taking Chances (2007). It was written and produced by Linda Perry, who also wrote and produced the track "New Dawn" for the same album. A live version of "My Love" was recorded at the Swedish Globe Arena in Stockholm during the Taking Chances World Tour. This version was later included on her fourth greatest hits album, My Love: Essential Collection (2008).

The radio version was issued as the lead single from the compilation, sent to radio on 22 September 2008 and released as a music download the following day. A physical two-track single followed on 20 October 2008 in the United Kingdom and on 31 October 2008 in Germany.

== Critical reception ==
"My Love" received generally positive reviews from music critics. Sarah Rodman of The Boston Globe described it as a "sky-scraping ballad", while Chuck Taylor of Billboard called it a "radio triumph" and "empowering". Ashante Infantry of the Toronto Star was less enthusiastic, describing it as a "cringe-worthy diva track". Other reviewers responded more favorably: Edna Gundersen of USA Today wrote that Dion "shows admirable restraint and grace on My Love". Sal Cinquemani of Slant Magazine was more reserved, stating that Linda Perry "didn't offer anything of worth".

== Commercial performance ==
"My Love" reached number nine on the Hungarian Singles Chart. The CD single was issued in the United Kingdom with minimal promotion, resulting in a peak at number 129 on the UK Singles Chart. The song performed better on adult contemporary radio, peaking at number eight in Canada and number 15 in the United States. On the Canadian Hot 100, "My Love" reached number 67.

== Music video ==
The live music video premiered on 25 September 2008. A studio‑recording video from the Taking Chances sessions was also included on the Japan‑only release Ultimate Box (2008).

== Live performances ==
Dion performed "My Love" at the 43rd annual Jerry Lewis MDA Telethon via satellite from her Taking Chances World Tour. The telethon took place on 31 August 2008 and was broadcast across television stations in the United States and Canada. On 28 October 2008, she performed the song on The Oprah Winfrey Show, and on 3 December 2008 on The Tonight Show with Jay Leno.

== Formats and track listing ==
- Digital single
1. "My Love" (radio version) – 4:09
- European CD and digital single
1. "My Love" (radio version) – 4:09
2. "My Love" (live version) – 5:04

== Charts ==
Chart performance
Chart (2008)	Peak position
Belgium (Ultratip Bubbling Under Wallonia)	19
Canada Hot 100 (Billboard)	67
Canada AC (Billboard)	8
CIS Airplay (TopHit)	178
Hungary (Single Top 40)	9
Italy (Musica e dischi)	33
Quebec Radio Songs (ADISQ)	13
Scottish Singles Sales (Official Charts)	25
UK Singles (Official Charts Company)	129
US Adult Contemporary (Billboard)	15

== Release history ==
Release history
Region	Date	Format	Version	Label	Ref.
United States	22 September 2008	Adult Contemporary radio	Radio edit	Columbia	
Various	23 September 2008	Digital download	Radio edit	Columbia	
United Kingdom	20 October 2008	CD; digital download	Radio edit; live	Columbia	
Germany	31 October 2008	CD; digital download	Radio edit; live	Columbia	
