= Meisa Kuroki discography =

- Studio albums: 2
- Extended plays: 2
- Singles: 7
- Music videos: 12

The discography of Japanese recording artist Meisa Kuroki consists of two studio albums, two extended plays, five singles, two digital singles and nine music videos.

== Albums ==
=== Studio albums ===
Title	Album details	Peak chart positions	Sales
Magazine	Released: January 26, 2011; Label: Gr8!; Formats: CD, digital download	6	26,858
Unlocked	Released: February 15, 2012; Label: Gr8!; Formats: CD, digital download	18	5,862
"—" denotes items that did not chart or were not released or missing information.

=== Extended plays ===
Title	Album details	Peak chart positions	Sales
Hellcat	Released: April 8, 2009; Label: Studioseven Recordings; Formats: CD, digital download	9	20,430
Attitude	Released: January 1, 2010; Label: Studioseven Recordings; Formats: CD, digital download	49	7,001

== Singles ==
List of singles, with selected chart positions and sales, showing year released and album name.
Title	Year	Peak chart positions		Sales		Album
Title	Year	Oricon	Billboard	Debut	Overall	Album
"Like This"	2008	—	—	—	—	Hellcat
"Bad Girl"	2009	—	81	—	—	Hellcat
"Shock (Unmei)"	2009	25	84	3,458	9,070	Magazine
"5 (Five)"	2010	23	—	4,177	5,561	Magazine
"LOL!"	2010	12	62	5,541	11,905	Magazine
"One More Drama"	2011	18	—	3,235	5,255	Unlocked
"Wired Life"	2011	12	55	9,158	14,553	Unlocked
"Woman's Worth / Breeze Out"	2011	47	—	2,727	2,727	Unlocked
"—" denotes items that did not chart or were not released or missing information.

== Other appearances ==
Year	Song	Album
2007	"Rock U (Movie Version)"	Crows Zero Original Soundtrack
2007	"Hero Lives in You (Short Version)"	Crows Zero Original Soundtrack
2009	"Bad Girl (Movie Version)"	Crows Zero 2 Original Soundtrack

== Music videos ==
Year	Title	Director(s)
2008	"Like This"	Kensuke Kawamura
2009	"Bad Girl"	Shigeaki Kubo
2009	"Criminal"	Shigeaki Kubo
2009	"Shock (Unmei)"	Shigeaki Kubo
2010	"Are Ya Ready?"	Shigeaki Kubo
2010	"5 (Five)"	Smith
2010	"LOL!"	Shigeaki Kubo
2011	"One More Drama"	Shigeaki Kubo
2011	"Wired Life"	Takuya Tada
2011	"Woman's Worth"	
2011	"Breeze Out"	
