= Bad Girl (Meisa Kuroki song) =

Song by Meisa Kuroki

from the album Hellcat
- Released: April 8, 2009
- Genre: Pop, R&B
- Length: 3:57
- Label: Studioseven Recordings
- Songwriter(s): U-ka, June
- Producer(s): June

"Bad Girl" is a song by Japanese recording artist Meisa Kuroki from her debut extended play (EP), Hellcat. The song was one of the main tracks used to promote the album. "Bad Girl" was featured in the 2009 film Crows Zero 2, in which Kuroki also appears. A "movie version" of the song was included on the film's soundtrack, released simultaneously with Hellcat on April 8, 2009. The music video for "Bad Girl" was directed by Kensuke Kawamura.

== Credits and personnel ==
- Meisa Kuroki – main vocals
- June – songwriter, producer, arrangement, instruments, programming
- U-ka – songwriter
- Neeraj Khajanchi (Nippon no Kokoro Sound) – recording
- D.O.I. (Daimonion Recordings) – mixing
- Yuji Chinone (Sony Music Studios Tokyo) – mastering

Credits adapted from Hellcat's liner notes.

== Charts ==
Chart (2009)	Peak position
Billboard Japan Hot 100	81
