= Jonathan Alberts =

Canadian-American film editor

- Jonathan Alberts at the 2026 New York Film Festival
- Born: Canada
- Occupation: Film Editor
- Years active: 1999–present

Jonathan Alberts, ACE, is a Canadian-American film editor. He is known for his work on All of Us Strangers, Like Crazy, Black Bird and The OA.

== Career ==
Alberts graduated from McGill University with a degree in English Literature. He began his career working in documentary in New York City before attending the American Film Institute, where he earned an MFA in film editing. In 2006, he edited the music video for Silversun Pickups' "Lazy Eye".

Alberts later worked on 45 Years (2015), directed by Andrew Haigh, followed by further collaborations with Haigh on Lean on Pete (2017) and All of Us Strangers (2023). He also edited the Apple TV+ miniseries, Black Bird (2022). He is a member of the American Cinema Editors (ACE).

== Selected filmography ==
=== Film ===
As Editor
Year	Film	Director	Notes
2023	All of Us Strangers	Andrew Haigh	
2020	Uncle Frank	Alan Ball	
2019	Earthquake Bird	Wash Westmoreland	
2017	Lean on Pete	Andrew Haigh	
2015	Equals	Drake Doremus	
2015	45 Years	Andrew Haigh	
2014	Better Living Through Chemistry	David Posamentier and Geoff Moore	
2013	Breathe In	Drake Doremus	
2011	Like Crazy	Drake Doremus	
2010	The High Cost of Living	Deborah Chow	
2008	Pedro	Nick Oceano	
2006	Wristcutters: A Love Story	Goran Dukić	
2004	Malachance	Gerardo Naranjo	
1999	The History of Glamour	Theresa Duncan	Short film

=== Television ===
As Editor
Year	Title	Notes
2024	The Listeners	4 episodes
2022	Black Bird	3 episodes
2021	The North Water	3 episodes
2018	The First	3 episodes
2016	The OA	4 episodes
2016	Looking: The Movie	TV Movie
2014−2015	Looking	6 episodes
2011	Hung	4 episodes

== Awards and nominations ==
Year	Result	Award	Category	Work	Ref.
2023	Won	British Independent Film Awards	Best Editing	All of Us Strangers	
2023	Runner-up	Los Angeles Film Critics Association Awards	Best Editing	All of Us Strangers	
2023	Nominated	International Cinephile Society Awards	Best Editing	All of Us Strangers	
