= Shock (Unmei) =

"Shock: Unmei"

Single by Meisa Kuroki

from the album Magazine
- Released: July 22, 2009
- Recorded: 2009
- Genre: R&B, Pop
- Length: 15:15
- Label: Studioseven Recordings
- Songwriters: Meisa, Clone, Jeff Miyahara, Shoko Fujibayashi, U-ka, June

Meisa Kuroki singles chronology
"Like This" (2008)	"Shock: Unmei" (2009)	"5-FIVE-" (2010)

Alternative covers
- Limited edition cover

"Shock: Unmei" (SHOCK -運命-) is Meisa Kuroki's first single, released on July 22, 2009. It was being used in Kirin's Cola Shock commercial, starring Kuroki herself.

== Track list ==
No.	Title	Lyrics	Music	Length
1.	"Shock: Unmei (SHOCK -運命-, Shock: Fate)"	Meisa, Clone, Jeff Miyahara	Jeff Miyahara, Meisa, Jeremy Soule	3:43
2.	"Wasted"	Shoko Fujibayashi	Miyahara, Meisa	3:02
3.	"Bad Girl (Bachlogic Remix)"	U-ka	June	3:43
4.	"Shock: Unmei (Instrumental) (SHOCK -運命- <Instrumental>)"	Meisa, Clone, Miyahara	Miyahara, Meisa, Soule	3:43

== Charts ==
=== Oricon Sales Charts ===
Release	Chart	Peak position	Debut sales	Sales total	Chart run
July 22, 2009	Oricon Daily Singles Chart	16		9,070	5 weeks
July 22, 2009	Oricon Weekly Singles Chart	25	3,458	9,070	5 weeks
July 22, 2009	Oricon Monthly Singles Chart			9,070	5 weeks
July 22, 2009	Oricon Yearly Singles Chart			9,070	5 weeks
