= Meisa =

- Gender: Female
- Language: Japanese

Origin
- Meaning: Dark sand/ in Iran: Inebriant

Meisa (めいさ, メイサ, 冥砂) is a Japanese feminine given name.

== People ==
- Meisa Chibana (知花 メイサ; born 1992), Japanese AV actress
- Meisa Fujishiro (藤代 冥砂; born 1967), Japanese photographer
- Meisa Hanai (花井 メイサ; born 1986), Japanese AV actress
- Meisa Kuroki (黒木 メイサ; born 1988), Japanese actress and singer
