= Wired Life =

Single by Meisa Kuroki

from the album UNLOCKED
- Released: August 31, 2011
- Recorded: 2011
- Genre: Electropop
- Length: 4:41
- Label: Gr8!
- Songwriter: Nao'ymt
- Producer: Nao'ymt

Meisa Kuroki singles chronology
"One More Drama" (2011)	"Wired Life" (2011)	"Woman's Worth / Breeze Out" (2011)

"Wired Life" is the fifth single by Japanese recording artist Meisa Kuroki. It was released on August 31, 2011, four months following the release of "One More Drama", as the second single from Kuroki's forthcoming second studio album. The single was issued in three formats: limited CD+DVD edition, limited Blue Exorcist edition and standard CD-only edition.

== Overview ==
The title track was written and produced by Nao'ymt. The song speaks about one's battle with oneself's "entangled" life. Kuroki explained, "(with this song) I wanted to show a different side of me as an artist, other than dancing." "Wired Life" served as ending theme to the TBS anime Blue Exorcist. In a press release, the show's producer commented, "I am truly honored to have this song featured on Blue Exorcist. Kuroki's strength and charm resembles that of the anime's protagonist, Rin Okumura, and I'm thankful that 'Wired Life' has captured the spirit of the show."

"Upgrade U!", which was initially announced as an A-side but later relegated to B-side status, was written by Kaoru Kami and composed and produced by Jeff Miyahara. The standard CD-only and limited CD+DVD editions also include a remix of "One More Drama". The Blue Exorcist edition includes a TV size version of the title track, as well as a remix featuring Rin Okumura's voice actor Nobuhiko Okamoto.

== Chart performance ==
"Wired Life" debuted at number 10 on the Oricon Daily Singles chart on August 30, 2011, and climbed to number 9 on September 1, 2011. With 9,158 copies sold, "Wired Life" peaked at number 12 on the Oricon Weekly Singles chart, becoming Kuroki's highest first week single sales.

== Track listing ==
No.	Title	Lyrics	Music	Arranger(s)	Length
1.	"Wired Life"	Nao'ymt	Nao'ymt	Nao'ymt	4:41
2.	"Upgrade U!"	Kaoru Kami	Jeff Miyahara	Miyahara	3:41
3.	"One More Drama (Ping Pong Mix)"	Kami	June	Dee. C	3:58
4.	"Wired Life (Instrumental)"		Nao'ymt	Nao'ymt	4:39
Total length:					17:00

Blue Exorcist edition CD
No.	Title	Lyrics	Music	Arranger(s)	Length
1.	"Wired Life"	Nao'ymt	Nao'ymt	Nao'ymt	4:40
2.	"Wired Life (No Escape Remix) featuring Rin Okumura"	Nao'ymt	Nao'ymt	Nao'ymt	4:31
3.	"Wired Life (Anime Size Version)"	Nao'ymt	Nao'ymt	Nao'ymt	2:13
4.	"Wired Life (Instrumental)"		Nao'ymt	Nao'ymt	4:39
Total length:					16:04

DVD
No.	Title	Length
1.	"Wired Life" (Music Video)
2.	"Wired Life" (Special Making Of)

== Charts ==
Chart (2011)	Peak position
Billboard Japan Hot 100	55
Billboard Japan Hot Singles Sales	12
Oricon Daily Singles	9
Oricon Weekly Singles	12
