= One Missed Call: Final =

2006 film by Manabu Asou

- Directed by: Manabu Asou
- Screenplay by: Minako Daira; Shiro Kuroi
- Based on: Chakushin Ari: Final by Yasushi Akimoto
- Produced by: Kazuo Kuroi: Yoichi Arishige; Akira Yamamoto
- Starring: Maki Horikita; Meisa Kuroki; Itsuji Itao; Jang Keun-suk
- Cinematography: Kaunari Tanaka
- Music by: Koji Endo: Toshiko Ezaki; Junichi Matsuda
- Production companies: Toho; Kadokawa; Nippon TV; CJ Entertainment; Kadokawa Movie Fund Group
- Distributed by: Toho
- Release date: 24 June 2006
- Running time: 106 minutes
- Countries: Japan; South Korea
- Languages: Japanese; Korean

One Missed Call: Final (Japanese: 着信アリFinal, Hepburn: Chakushin ari: Final) is a 2006 horror film and the third and final entry of the One Missed Call trilogy, written by franchise creator Yasushi Akimoto and directed by Manabu Asou.

== Plot ==
High school student Pam hangs herself at school due to severe bullying from her classmates, but she is saved and committed to a hospital in a state of coma. Her friend, Asuka Matsuda, who is also bullied, plans to take revenge against their classmates, all of whom have gone to Busan, South Korea, on a field trip. Using her computer, she clicks her class photo to place the cell phone curse. Her first victim is Azusa Kusunoki; Azusa receives a message accompanied by a photo showing her hanged. At Busan, Azusa is separated from her classmates in a busy marketplace and is killed when a noose drags and hangs her, with her spitting out a red candy afterwards. Teruya Mikami receives the message next, but now accompanied with the text "Death exempt by forwarding the message". He shrugs it off and goes to a restroom, but is killed when a loose telephone wire electrocutes him to death. More students start to receive the message, and they race to forward it to their friends, saving them at the cost of their friends' lives.

Asuka's close friend, Emiri Kusama, whose boyfriend, Ahn Jin-woo, is deaf, calls Asuka to stop her, to no avail. They learn that the curse came from Mimiko Mizunuma, a girl who died from asthma. Emiri reveals to Jin-woo that PAM is a nickname for Asuka to denote her status in their class (a diminutive of "Spam"), exposing the current Asuka as her impostor. She also reveals that Asuka became the target of bullying due to standing up for Emiri, who was originally the one bullied first. With Jin-woo's advice, Emiri apologizes to Asuka, awaking the real Asuka.

Realizing that the curse's source is Asuka's computer, Emiri and Jin-woo race to send mails to overload the computer's inbox, with help from their friends who spread the news through South Korea and Japan. While sending mails, Emiri's computer connects with Asuka's at the same time when Asuka comes back home. The two have a conversation, but when Emiri receives the cursed message, both are transported to different places in their school. Finding Asuka about to commit suicide with Mimiko, Emiri recalls their promise to visit the shore and offers herself to replace Asuka. Before Mimiko can do so, Asuka's computer is overloaded and the two are sent back to their previous places. While parting ways with Emiri, Jin-woo snatches her phone (which still has the curse), and forwards the message to himself. Afterwards, he is violently killed as Emiri watches in shock. Some time later, Asuka and Emiri, the latter having lost her ability to speak and walk due to all the events that occurred, visit the shore as promised.

== Cast ==
- Maki Horikita as Asuka Matsuda (松田 明日香, Matsuda Asuka) / PAM (パム, Pamu)
- Meisa Kuroki as Emiri Kusama (草間 えみり, Kusama Emiri)
- Jang Keun-suk as Ahn Jin-woo (アン・ジヌ, An Jinu; 안진우)
- Erika Asakura as Minori Yazawa (矢澤 みのり, Yazawa Minori)
- Yū Kamiwaki as Mari Shimazaki (島崎 真理, Shimazaki Mari)
- Rakuto Tochihara as Shinichi Imahara (今原 信一, Imahara Shin'ichi)
- Kazuma Yamane as Teruya Mikami (三上 輝也, Mikami Teruya)
- Takashi Yamagata as Takehiro Koizumi (小泉 丈弘, Koizumi Takehiro)
- Mami Hashimoto as Mizue Kawanaka (川中 瑞江, Kawanaka Mizue)
- Miho Amakawa as Azusa Kusunoki (楠木 あずさ, Kusunoki Azusa)
- Ayumi Takahashi as Tomoka Manabe (真鍋 友香, Manabe Tomoka)
- Ryu Morioka as Hiroyuki Tsukamoto (塚本 浩之, Tsukamoto Hiroyuki)
- Yuta Murakami as Toru Akaike (赤池 徹, Akaike Tōru)
- Karen Oshima as Mimiko Mizunuma (水沼 美々子, Mizunuma Mimiko)
- Yoshiko Noda as Misaki Sonoda (園田 美咲, Sonoda Misaki)
- Itsuji Itao as Yoshitaka Kibe (木部 義孝, Kibe Yoshitaka)

Additionally, Mariko Tsutsui and Sena Shimizu appear as Marie and Nanako Mizunuma, respectively, through archive footage from the first film.

== Release ==
One Missed Call: Final was released on June 24, 2006, where it was distributed by Toho.

== Critical reception ==
One Missed Call: Final has received mixed reviews from audiences, with the review aggregator website Rotten Tomatoes reporting a 58% approval rating from audience members. It is the second-highest-grossing film in the series after One Missed Call (2003).

== Notes ==
=== References ===
- Galbraith IV, Stuart (2008). The Toho Studios Story: A History and Complete Filmography. Scarecrow Press. ISBN 978-1461673743.
