= Vexille =

- Japanese promotional poster
- Directed by: Fumihiko Sori
- Written by: Haruka Handa; Fumihiko Sori
- Produced by: Toshio Nakazawa; Ichirō Takase; Yumiko Yoshihara
- Starring: Meisa Kuroki; Yasuko Matsuyuki; Shosuke Tanihara
- Edited by: Fumihiko Sori
- Music by: Paul Oakenfold
- Production company: Oxybot
- Distributed by: Shochiku
- Release date: August 18, 2007 (Japan)
- Running time: 111 minutes
- Country: Japan
- Language: Japanese
- Budget: $10 million
- Box office: $1.2 million

Vexille (Japanese: ベクシル 2077日本鎖国, Hepburn: Bekushiru 2077 Nihon sakoku; lit. "Vexille: 2077 Japanese Isolation") is a 2007 Japanese CGI anime science fiction film written, directed, and edited by Fumihiko Sori, and features the voices of Meisa Kuroki, Yasuko Matsuyuki, and Shosuke Tanihara.

At the 60th Locarno International Film Festival, where Vexille made its world premiere, the film was sold to 75 countries, including the United States–based distributor, Funimation Entertainment; the number has since increased to 129 countries.

== Plot ==
By the 2060s, robotics technology has become extremely advanced, including cybernetics. World opinion begins to turn against robotics, leading to the U.N. declaring a unilateral ban on further research in 2067. Japan, being home to robotics pioneer Daiwa Heavy Industries, strongly protests this ban, but is unable to prevent its passage. In protest, Japan withdraws from international politics. All foreigners are deported, and further immigration is prohibited. In addition, the R.A.C.E. network is constructed—270 off-shore installations that cover Japan with an energy field, nullifying all communication with the outside world and making satellite surveillance impossible. Trade and diplomacy continues, but Japan vanishes from the world scene.

Ten years later, agents of the United States Navy special warfare unit "SWORD", including agent Vexille, pursue Satio, a Japanese informant for Daiwa, in Colorado, but he escapes them by cutting off his own leg. Discovering the leg is made of bio-metal, SWORD suspects that Japan has concealed extensive development of banned technologies. They embark on an unapproved scheme to infiltrate Japan and to find out the frequency of the R.A.C.E. network, enabling SWORD to gather intelligence on the country. Although the agents successfully enter Japan, they are detected by security forces before they can transmit their data. All except Vexille and her lover Leon are killed, with the latter taken to Daiwa's headquarters. Vexille awakens to find Tokyo is now a shanty town ruled by Daiwa. Her rescuers, a small resistance movement that opposes the company, uses Vexille's transmitter to successfully transmit the distortion frequency.

Maria, the head of the resistance, details the 10 years of secrecy while SWORD studies Japan in shocked horror—the islands are a lifeless wasteland. In 2067, an unknown disease reportedly struck Japan and was countered by an experimental vaccine. In actuality, the disease reports were faked by Daiwa as an excuse for Daiwa to test the "vaccine", which was actually experimental nanotechnology that subsequently converted every Japanese citizen into a form of synthetic life, but there were unforeseen side effects; the conversion was imperfect, which ultimately would cause all the infected humans to lose their free will and become just lifelike machines, while some of the nanotech went amok, creating the "Jags", giant whirling constructs of semisentient metal that prowl the wilderness. The Jags destroyed all of Japan, save Tokyo which is protected by an inedible wall of ceramic.

The Resistance plans to draw the Jags along a service bridge to Daiwa's corporate headquarters, which now stands in the middle of Tokyo Bay. Vexille volunteers her assistance (and that of her flight-capable armor). However, though Vexille and Maria succeed in drawing the Jags to the end of the service bridge, the bridge has been detached from the headquarters, the Jags fall into the sea, and Vexille and Maria are captured. They are taken to Kisaragi, the master of Daiwa, who boasts that his research is nearly complete and as he needs more test subjects, he is going to invade America. Vexille attacks him with a hidden knife, revealing that his blood is still human—he has not used the process himself. Saito then strangles him. The town council forces the ceramic gates open, destroying Tokyo and enabling the Jags to enter Daiwa's headquarters. Kisaragi, having somehow survived, shoots Saito and escapes with his research. The underling then releases Vexille and Maria before succumbing to his wounds.

Vexille pursues Kisaragi while Maria frees Leon, who shows concern for Vexille, angering Maria. Thus when Vexille prevents Kisaragi's escape in a helicopter, Maria grabs him and holds them together as a Jag devours them. Vexille and Leon are rescued by a SWORD helicopter just as Daiwa headquarters collapses into the bay, along with every Jag in Japan. As Vexille and Leon are flown from a now completely lifeless Japan, Vexille comments that humanity's spirit can never be taken away.

== Cast ==
=== Japanese ===
- Meisa Kuroki as Lt. Cdr. Vexille Serra
- Shosuke Tanihara as Cdr. Leon Fayden
- Yasuko Matsuyuki as Maria
- Takaya Kuroda as Zack
- Akio Ōtsuka as Saito
- Romi Park as Takashi
- Takahiro Sakurai as Ryo
- Toshiyuki Morikawa as Kisaragi
- Tetsuya Kakihara as Taro
- Takayuki Sugo as Captain Borg
- Kenji Takahashi as Saga
- Jiro Saito as Chairman Itakura

=== English ===
- Colleen Clinkenbeard as Lt. Cdr. Vexille Serra
- Travis Willingham as Cdr. Leon Fayden
- Christine Auten as Maria
- Christopher Sabat as Zack
- Jason Douglas as Saito
- Luci Christian as Takashi
- Illich Guardiola as Ryo
- J. Michael Tatum as Kisaragi
- Todd Haberkorn as Taro
- John Swasey as Captain Borg
- Phil Parsons as Saga
- Kent Williams as Chairman Itakura

== Music ==
The original soundtrack and music to the series features an electronic, techno, urumee melam and trance theme, and features Basement Jaxx, Boom Boom Satellites, Asian Dub Foundation, Dead Can Dance, Carl Craig, The Prodigy, DJ Shadow, M.I.A, with singer Mink providing the theme song "Together again" and Paul Oakenfold handling the music score production, which was co-written with Ian Green and Michael J McEvoy. McEvoy also orchestrated and programmed the score.

== Reception ==
Vexille has been said to have a Resident Evil-like plotline and has drawn many comparisons to the movie. A review of the DVD on website IGN gave this film six out of ten, finding it difficult to follow and riddled with plot holes. They also found fault with the soundtrack, particularly Paul Oakenfold's score: "A couple of tracks manage to rise to the occasion, but for the most part, Vexille's tunes feel limp and repetitive." Hyper comments on the film for "retreading of familiar territory already covered effectively by Ghost in the Shell". It commends the visuals for its "cel-shading and rotoscoping, leading to some incredibly impressive looking set pieces". However, it criticises the action scenes which "aren't nearly as exciting as they should be — most of the action scenes boil down to rather mundane gun fights or chases, and while they look great there's no real energy in them." It currently has a 60% approval rating on Rotten Tomatoes.

== Releases ==
For Region 1, Vexille was first released in a one-disc format on May 20, 2008, followed by a 2-Disc special edition on November 4, 2008. Both versions include the original Japanese soundtrack as well as the English dub, with optional subtitles.

A Blu-ray Disc version was released on the same day as the 2-Disc special edition and includes exactly the same features as its DVD counterpart.

The Region 2 DVD was released on September 1, 2008, in a limited edition steelbook 2-Disc set, featuring only the original Japanese soundtrack with English subtitles without English Dub. That version has since gone out of print and has been replaced by a standard one-disc set with no extra features.

A Blu-ray Disc version is yet to be released on Region B.

== Live-action film ==
Universal Studios has acquired the rights to the film to produce a live-action remake. Beau Flynn and Tripp Vinson have signed on as producers, Lisa Zambri as executive producer and Evan Spiliotopoulos as screenwriter.

== See also ==
- Appleseed
