= Magazine (Meisa Kuroki album) =

Studio album by Meisa Kuroki
- Released: January 26, 2011 (Japan)
- Recorded: 2009–2010
- Genre: R&B, pop, J-pop
- Length: 52:06
- Label: Studioseven Recordings

Meisa Kuroki chronology
Attitude (2010)	Magazine (2011)	Unlocked (2012)

Singles from Magazine
- 1. "Shock -Unmei-" Released: July 9, 2009; 2. "5-FIVE-" Released: June 2, 2010; 3. "LOL!" Released: October 10, 2010

Magazine is the first studio album by the Japanese singer, model and actress Meisa Kuroki. It was released on January 26, 2011 in 3 editions: two CD+DVD editions (Type A comes with a music video compilation since her first music video "Like This" and Type B comes with a footage from her first solo live "Attitude 2010") and a Regular edition. The album ranked #5 in Oricon Daily Chart and #6 in Oricon Weekly Chart with 16,238 copies sold in the first week.

== Track listing ==
No.	Title	Length
1.	"Intro -MAGAZINE-"	1:03
2.	"LOL!"	4:04
3.	"Switch" (typeset as SWITCH⇔)	4:29
4.	"Bye Bye My Friend"	3:39
5.	"Celebrate"	4:21
6.	"Shock -Unmei-" (SHOCK -運命-)	3:45
7.	"Say Good Night" (typeset as Say Good Night☆)	4:27
8.	"As I Am"	3:48
9.	"Why??"	3:59
10.	"Loneliness"	3:36
11.	"Loveholic"	3:20
12.	"Wasted"	3:04
13.	"5-FIVE-"	4:02
14.	"Somewhere..."	4:38
Total length:		52:06

DVD (Type A - Music Videos)
No.	Title	Length
1.	"Like This"
2.	"Bad Girl"
3.	"Criminal"
4.	"Shock -Unmei-"
5.	"Are ya Ready?"
6.	"5-FIVE-"
7.	"LOL!"

DVD (Type B - ATTITUDE 2010)
No.	Title	Length
1.	"Opening"
2.	"Hear the Alarm?"
3.	"Shock -Unmei-"
4.	"Bad Girl"
5.	"Awakening"
6.	"Are ya Ready?"
7.	"Kind of Guy"
8.	"Stand Up!"
9.	"LOL!"
10.	"MC"
11.	"Wasted"
12.	"Ending"

== Charts ==
Chart	Peak position
Billboard Japan Top albums	6

=== Oricon charts ===
Released	Oricon Chart	Peak	Debut sales	Sales total
January 26, 2011	Daily Albums Chart	5	16,238	25,000+
January 26, 2011	Weekly Albums Chart	6	16,238	25,000+
January 26, 2011	Monthly Albums Chart	36	16,238	25,000+
