= Wristcutters: A Love Story =

2006 American black comedy movie

- Theatrical release poster
- Directed by: Goran Dukić
- Screenplay by: Goran Dukić
- Based on: "Kneller's Happy Campers" by Etgar Keret
- Produced by: Chris Coen; Tatiana Kelly; Mikal P. Lazarev; Adam Sherman
- Starring: Patrick Fugit; Shannyn Sossamon; Shea Whigham; Leslie Bibb; Tom Waits
- Cinematography: Vanja Cernjul
- Edited by: Jonathan Alberts
- Music by: Bobby Johnston; Gogol Bordello
- Production company: No Matter Pictures
- Distributed by: Autonomous Films
- Release dates: January 24, 2006 (Sundance); October 19, 2007 (United States)
- Running time: 89 minutes
- Countries: United Kingdom; United States
- Language: English
- Budget: $1 million
- Box office: $454,026

Wristcutters: A Love Story is a 2006 dark comedy film written and directed by Goran Dukić. It stars Patrick Fugit, Shea Whigham, and Shannyn Sossamon as denizens of a strange afterlife way-station that has been reserved for people who committed suicide. It is based on Etgar Keret's short story "Kneller's Happy Campers". A graphic novel version was titled Pizzeria Kamikaze. The film was produced on an estimated budget of $1 million. It premiered at the 2006 Sundance Film Festival and was distributed in limited release on October 19, 2007, before being expanded into wide release on November 2, 2007. Lionsgate Home Entertainment released it on DVD on March 25, 2008. The film received positive reviews and has since garnered a cult following.

== Plot ==
After Zia takes his own life, he finds himself in an afterlife where the color is dim, there are no stars, and no one can smile. This realm is populated by people who have died by suicide, such as Eugene, a Russian musician who lives with his mother, father, and brother (all suicide victims). Together they waste most of their afterlives in bars until Zia learns that his ex-girlfriend, Desiree, took her own life shortly after Zia's death. He and Eugene take to the road to find her. Eugene's car has two idiosyncrasies: a black hole underneath the passenger seat where items that are dropped disappear forever, and broken headlights that cannot be fixed by even the most adept mechanics. On their trip, they pick up a hitchhiker, Mikal, who insists she has arrived by mistake, and is seeking the "people in charge" in order to be sent back.

As the trio journey along a desolate highway, Mikal pushes a button, miraculously activating the broken headlights. They come upon a man lying in the middle of the dark highway, forcing them to veer off the road and wrecking the car in the process. The man, Kneller, an eccentric commune leader, had fallen asleep while looking for his dog. Kneller invites them back to his camp, where they discover that minor "miracles" occur, as long as the campers remain apathetic about the result. Zia obsesses over the miracles and his inability to perform them. Mikal reveals that her death was an accidental overdose. Eugene meets a young woman, Nanuk, whom he romances. Just as Mikal and Zia discuss their plans to leave Kneller's camp, another camper, Yan, emerges from the woods with news that Kneller's dog has been abducted by a cult leader called "Messiah King". Kneller, Zia, Mikal, and Yan set off in search of King and Kneller's dog.

The group find themselves lost and decide to make camp for the night. Unable to sleep, Mikal and Zia discover a nearby ocean shore, where they kiss and spend the night together. In the morning, Kneller discovers them lying among a seashore of used condoms and hypodermic needles. The group eventually reaches King's camp, where they discover that King is readying himself for a "real" miracle – to separate his soul from his body. As Kneller confronts King, Zia discovers that Desiree is a devout cult follower, having taken her own life for the purpose of following King into the afterlife.

As King is about to perform a public ritual suicide, Kneller reveals himself to be an undercover agent for the people in charge. King and Desiree are taken away, while Mikal leaves with them, promising Zia that she'll return. As Zia waits, Eugene and Nanuk arrive, explaining that Mikal has been returned to life and Kneller's camp has been shut down. Eugene and Nanuk depart together on a train, giving Eugene's car to Zia. After finally performing a miracle – creating a star in the sky with a lit match next to one that Mikal had created earlier – Zia decides to take the car and wander. While he is turning over a cassette tape to place in the stereo, it accidentally falls into the passenger side feet area. He reaches for it and enters the black hole under the car seat.

In a large warehouse filled with rows of boxes, Kneller picks up Zia's file, places it into his inside breast pocket, and comments on how fortunate it is to know people in high places. Zia wakes up in a hospital bed. He turns his head, seeing his parents outside talking to doctors. When he looks at the person in the bed next to his, he sees Mikal. Both look at each other and smile.

== Cast ==
- Patrick Fugit as Zia
- Shannyn Sossamon as Mikal
- Shea Whigham as Eugene
- Leslie Bibb as Desiree Randolph
- Tom Waits as Kneller
- Will Arnett as Messiah King
- Nick Offerman as Cop
- Mary Pat Gleason as Eugene's mother
- Anatol Rezmeritza as Eugene's father
- John Hawkes as Yan
- Jake Busey as Brian
- Mikal P. Lazarev as Nanuk
- Sarah Roemer as Rachel
- Mark Boone Junior as Mike
- Clayne Crawford as Jim
- Irwin Keyes as Stiff Drinks bartender

== Production ==
The film was originally intended to be shot on super-16 color infrared film, which was produced specially by Kodak. The color-shifts inherent in using this kind of film were thought to enhance the parallel world feel to the action. In the end, it proved to be too time-consuming and the film was shot using normal filmstock manipulated in post-processing.

== Music ==
Gogol Bordello's music is used throughout the film; the character Eugene is partly based on the band's lead singer, Eugene Hütz. Tom Waits, who plays Kneller in the film, also appears on the soundtrack with the song "Dead and Lovely" (from his 2004 album Real Gone) in the opening credits. Joy Division's "Love Will Tear Us Apart" and Christian Death's "Deathwish" can be heard in the background of the first bar scene of the film (both bands were fronted by singers who died by suicide), and an arrangement of "Gloomy Sunday" can be heard at a later point, all songs about or associated with suicide.

== Reception ==
The film has a 66% approval rating on Rotten Tomatoes. The consensus reads, "Wristcutters: A Love Story sounds like a normal enough indie flick. Boy meets girl. Boy gets separated from girl. Boy goes on a road trip with friends to find girl and gains a new perspective on life. Except everybody's dead." On Metacritic, it has a rating of 62/100, which the site labels as "generally favorable reviews". The film received a positive review in The New York Times, which named it a "Critics' Pick" and said in part that it "has an offbeat, absurdist charm that turns a potentially creepy concept into an odd, touching adventure."

== Awards ==
- Independent Spirit Award for Best First Screenplay – Nominee
- Independent Spirit Award for Best First Feature – Nominee
- 2006 Sundance Film Festival – Grand Jury Prize – Nominee
- Seattle International Film Festival Awards – Best Director – Won
- Gen Art 2006 – Best Feature Film – Won
- Philadelphia Film Festival 2006 – Best First Feature – Won
- Humanitas Prize 2006 – Best Screenplay – Nominee
- Motovun Film Festival 2006 – Best Film Audience Award – Won
- Sundance Screenwriter's Lab selection
