= 40 Days and 40 Nights =

2002 film by Michael Lehmann

- Theatrical release poster
- Directed by: Michael Lehmann
- Written by: Robert Perez
- Produced by: Tim Bevan; Eric Fellner; Michael London
- Starring: Josh Hartnett; Shannyn Sossamon; Vinessa Shaw; Paulo Costanzo; Griffin Dunne
- Cinematography: Elliot Davis
- Edited by: Nicholas C. Smith
- Music by: Rolfe Kent
- Production companies: StudioCanal; Working Title Films; MiLo Productions
- Distributed by: Miramax Films (United States); Universal Pictures (through United International Pictures; international)
- Release date: March 1, 2002
- Running time: 96 minutes
- Countries: United States; United Kingdom; France
- Language: English
- Budget: $17 million
- Box office: $95.1 million

40 Days and 40 Nights is a 2002 romantic comedy film directed by Michael Lehmann, written by Rob Perez, and starring Josh Hartnett, Shannyn Sossamon and Paulo Costanzo. The film depicts Matt Sullivan, a San Francisco web designer who has chosen to abstain from any sexual contact for the duration of Lent. Released on March 1, 2002 by Miramax Films in the United States and by Universal Pictures (through United International Pictures) in other territories, the film received mixed reviews from critics and grossed $95.1 million against a $17 million budget, becoming a commercial success.

== Plot ==
Matt Sullivan lives in San Francisco with his roommate Ryan, working at a dot-com company. His obsession with his ex-girlfriend Nicole Besser, who broke up with him, causes him sexual dysfunction with other women, which he confides to his brother John, a Catholic priest-in-training. After disastrously trying to fake an orgasm with a date, Matt learns that Nicole is now engaged. Hoping to resolve his issues, he vows to abstain from sexual stimulation, including masturbation, for the 40 days of Lent.

On the first day of his celibacy, Matt purges his apartment of items of temptation and reminders of Nicole. He befriends a stranger named Erica Sutton at a laundromat, despite being unable to speak to her. Unbeknownst to Matt, his coworkers and Ryan start a pool to bet on how long he can last, which soon spreads online. He revisits the laundromat to see Erica, who reveals she works as a “cyber nanny” filtering internet pornography. They share an emotional connection, and Matt takes Erica on a date riding the city bus, but awkwardly avoids kissing her.

Matt and Erica both discover his coworkers’ betting pool, complete with its own website. Matt tries to explain his intentions, but Erica remains upset, and Matt's boss Jerry Anderson decides to join him in celibacy. Having fallen for Matt, she agrees to another date, where they run into Nicole and her fiancé David Brokaw. Frustrated by Matt's vow and his feelings for Nicole, Erica leaves him. Struggling with his urges, Matt is forced to endure his coworkers’ attempts to sabotage him. He turns to John for help but even a family dinner results in their parents Walter and Beverly discussing their own sex life.

By Day 35 of Matt's vow, the pool has reached $18,000 and his colleague Duncan convinces him to give in. As Matt marches into the bathroom to masturbate, he discovers Jerry, who accidentally had a Viagra-spiked drink intended for Matt, masturbating in the next stall. With the entire office waiting, Matt escapes through the bathroom window and goes to Erica. They reconcile and spend a night of intimacy together without actual intercourse.

On Day 38, Matt has an inadvertent erection at work and is sent home. Nicole arrives at his apartment, having broken up with the cheating David but Matt rejects her advances and sends her away, which only excites her more. Overhearing the bet the next day, she goes to Matt's coworkers, adding her own $3,500 to the pot and discovering that Matt has plans to celebrate with Erica at midnight when his vow ends.

On Day 40, the long-suffering Matt is unable to stop picturing women naked. He walks in on John kissing a nun; tormented by Matt's exploits, John is taking a sabbatical from the priesthood. Fighting to contain himself, Matt has Ryan handcuff him to his bed and awakens from an erotic dream to find Nicole has raped him while he was asleep, just before midnight. Arriving as Nicole is leaving, Erica assumes Matt was unfaithful and dishonored his vow and storms out.

Determined to win Erica back, Matt gives her a box of moments they had shared; he finds her at the laundromat, and they finally kiss. As they consummate their relationship in Matt's bedroom for hours, Ryan and the coworkers wait outside and place new bets on how long he can last, until Matt kicks them all out.

== Cast ==
- Josh Hartnett as Matt Sullivan
- Shannyn Sossamon as Erica Sutton
- Vinessa Shaw as Nicole Besser
- Paulo Costanzo as Ryan
- Maggie Gyllenhaal as Sam
- Mike Maronna as Bagel Boy
- Glenn Fitzgerald as Chris
- Mary Gross as Beverly Sullivan
- Stanley Anderson as Father Maher
- Adam Trese as John Sullivan
- Barry Newman as Walter Sullivan
- Griffin Dunne as Jerry Anderson
- Emmanuelle Vaugier as Susie
- Lorin Heath as Diana
- Monet Mazur as Candy
- Christine Chatelain as Andie
- Keegan Connor Tracy as Mandy
- Stefanie von Pfetten as Chinatown Girl
- Jarrad Paul as Duncan
- Terry Chen as Neil
- Kai Lennox as Nick
- Chris Gauthier as Mikey
- Dylan Neal as David Brokaw
- Michelle Harrison as Maureen
- Natassia Malthe as Girl in Bed
- Chiara Zanni as Nun

== Production ==
Writer Rob Perez said they pitched the film to every studio in town, and eventually got a deal. Perez turned in the first draft a few months later and the film was greenlit. Thirteen months after having sold the pitch, filming began. The film was released a year-and-a-half later. In 2009, Perez noted how lucky he was that the film got made: "At the time I believed the film was made because of the script. However, in retrospect I believe it was made because of a confluence of a 20 completely random stars aligning. This included an influx of money at the studio from a new partnership; their recent films had been hits; young comedies like mine were connecting at the time; a few bankable actors in the age range wanted to play the lead; the executive(s) happened to like (or at least think it was commercial) the concept/script; and that the producer was hungry enough that when he hit road blocks, he found other ways to keep moving forward. I can go on, but hope this is enough to illustrate my point: the film was made because of 20 things that had nothing to do with the script."

The film was shot primarily in Vancouver, but also featured some San Francisco locations, including Potrero Hill.

== Reception ==
=== Critical response ===
On Rotten Tomatoes the film has an approval rating of 40% based on reviews from 135 critics, with an average rating of 4.90/10. The site's consensus states: "As romantic comedies go, 40 Days and 40 Nights is smutty, sexist, and puerile." On Metacritic the film has a score of 53%, based on reviews from 33 critics. Audiences surveyed by CinemaScore gave the film a grade B on scale of A to F.

Roger Ebert of Chicago Sun-Times gave the film three out of four stars. He praised director Michael Lehmann for raising the film above the level of sexual sitcom, through his sympathy for his characters and use of humor to examine human nature. He also credited writer Rob Perez for dialogue about sex with "more complexity and nuance than we expect." Not wanting to reveal too much, Ebert explained he was dissatisfied with the ending, writing: "Nicole's entire participation is offensive and unnecessary, and that there was a sweeter and funnier way to resolve everything". Variety's Todd McCarthy called it: "A self-described abstinence comedy that is funny, sexy and silly in equal measure" but notes "had tried to deepen the film’s potentially serious themes as often as they make light of them, they might have come up with something more than the disposable farce at hand."

Peter Travers called it "a one-joke sex farce," and complained: "Yup, director Michael Lehmann, far from the glory days of Heathers, has made a movie about a hard-on, in which he relentlessly pounds a flaccid premise." In 2005, Empire included the film on its list of "Worst Sex Scenes."

=== Box office ===
The film earned in its opening weekend $12,229,529. It earned $37,939,782 at the domestic box office and $57,152,885 in other territories, for a worldwide total of $95,146,283.
