= One Missed Call (2008 film) =

2008 film by Eric Valette

- Theatrical release poster
- Directed by: Eric Valette
- Screenplay by: Andrew Klavan
- Based on: Chakushin Ari by Yasushi Akimoto
- Produced by: Andrew Kosove; Broderick Johnson; Scott Kroopf; Jennie Lew Tugend; Lauren Weissman
- Starring: Shannyn Sossamon; Ed Burns; Ana Claudia Talancón; Ray Wise; Azura Skye
- Cinematography: Glen MacPherson
- Edited by: Steve Mirkovich
- Music by: Reinhold Heil; Johnny Klimek
- Production companies: Alcon Entertainment; Kadokawa Pictures; Equity Pictures; Intermedia Films
- Distributed by: Warner Bros. Pictures; (International); Kadokawa Pictures; (Japan)
- Release dates: January 4, 2008 (United States); March 20, 2008 (Germany); April 4, 2008 (United Kingdom); July 19, 2008 (Japan)
- Running time: 87 minutes
- Countries: United States; United Kingdom; Japan; Germany
- Language: English
- Budget: $20 million
- Box office: $45.8 million

One Missed Call is a 2008 supernatural horror film directed by Eric Valette and written by Andrew Klavan. An international co-production between the United States, the United Kingdom, Japan and Germany, it is a remake of the 2003 Japanese film of the same name directed by Takashi Miike, which itself was based on the Yasushi Akimoto novel Chakushin Ari. The film stars Shannyn Sossamon, Edward Burns, Ana Claudia Talancón, Ray Wise, and Azura Skye.

The film was released in North America on January 4, 2008. Despite being a moderate box office success, the film was panned by film critics, with many regarding it as the worst J-horror remake to be released. It became the worst-reviewed film of 2008, receiving a 0% rating approval on Rotten Tomatoes and winning a Moldy Tomato Award on the same site.

== Plot ==
A paramedic rescues a young girl from the blazing Saint Luke's hospital before unsuccessfully inquiring about her mother's whereabouts. Sometime afterwards, undergraduate Shelley Baum hears her cat meowing near her house's koi pond. After she heads over to investigate, a hand appears and drowns her and her cat. Days later, college students Beth Raymond and Leann Cole discuss Shelley's funeral. Leann's cellphone rings in a lullaby-esque ringtone, with a call from Shelley. She opens it to an eerie voicemail of herself, dated June 12 at 10:17 PM. Subsequently, suffering from disturbing hallucinations, she calls Beth while returning from a study session. Beth rushes to her location but arrives just as Leann falls off an overpass and is struck by a train. A red candy pops out of her mouth, and her severed hand dials a number on her phone. At Leann's funeral, her ex-boyfriend Brian Sousa departs after experiencing hallucinations. Outside a coffee shop, he shows Beth Leann's post-mortem voicemail, dated minutes away. An acetylene tank explosion from the adjacent construction site launches debris into the air, and a rebar impales Brian's torso. A red candy is ejected from his mouth, and he collapses.

The next day, Beth meets police detective Jack Andrews, who mentions that his sister Jean interned with Shelley at Saint Luke's and died herself two days prior. They determine the events are interrelated and he provides his contact card. Beth consoles her friend Taylor Anthony, who is distraught by a premonitory feeling of being the next victim, so Beth removes the batteries from both their cellphones to disable them. That night, Taylor's cellphone rings; she opens it to see a video of her apparent demise. The following morning, Jack and Beth research geriatric nurse Marie Layton, originator of the calls, and find the autopsy report of her eldest daughter Ellie, who died from an acute asthmatic episode. The file, mentioning "no bruising but evidence of past scars" with an attached CPS file for further consultation, indicates that Jean, a psychiatric nurse, questioned Marie at Saint Luke's and noted nine admissions between April and May for Ellie and her sister Laurel, concerning several causes, leading Beth to assume that Marie had FDIA.

Meanwhile, TV producer Ted Summers, who approached Taylor earlier, prepares to record her exorcism, explaining that spiritual energy operates in the same electromagnetic spectrum as light/microwaves and is therefore transmissible via cellular phones from which it manifests as hallucinations. Noticing the show's advertisement on TV, Beth races to the site, arriving to an unseen force fatally choking Taylor. Her phone then sounds with a voicemail dated for tomorrow. Taking Beth home, Jack learns about her past in which her mother was abusive towards her (in particular burning her daughter with cigarettes), and her father, aware of his wife's abuse, hanged himself in their house's attic.

Assuming that finding Marie will settle the matter, she ventures to Saint Luke's and encounters Jack. As they enter an operating room, Marie's spirit ejects and incapacitates Jack. Locked inside, Beth throws a chiming phone across the room, where it knocks the air duct's grill cover loose, revealing a crawlspace. Inside, she discovers Marie's charred corpse clutching a cellphone. Marie's corpse awakens and, after pursuing and intercepting Beth, weeps and murmurs, "Forgive me." Subsequently, Beth tells Jack that Marie might have brought her there to protect her.

At Laurel's foster home, Jack uncovers a compact disc from the nanny cam embedded in the eye of Laurel's teddy bear. The footage reveals Ellie incising Laurel with a knife in their bedroom. Marie entered shortly thereafter, discovered Ellie's abusiveness, and rushed Laurel to the hospital. Ellie, locked inside, began pressing wheezingly on the inhaler but was overwhelmed and collapsed, facing the future curse's constituents (millipedes, an uncanny doll of a mother with baby in a perambulator (hallucinations), and the lullaby-esque music emanating from the teddy, audible during every victim's call), before dying from asphyxia while dialing her mother's phone number. Laurel reveals that though Ellie injured her, she always provided candies. Realizing Ellie caused the curse, Jack drives to Beth's house, during which a colleague informs him of a new voicemail. After he enters, somebody knocks on the door. As he peers through the peephole, a knife stabs through it, killing him. Ellie appears and attacks Beth, but Marie's spirit intervenes, binds Ellie in Jack's phone, and reconciles with Beth before evanescing. Jack's mouth spills a red candy and his cellphone auto-dials, revealing that the curse is still active.

== Cast ==
- Shannyn Sossamon as Beth Raymond
  - Alana Locke as Young Beth Raymond
- Ed Burns as Detective Jack Andrews
- Ana Claudia Talancón as Taylor Anthony
- Ray Wise as Ted Summers
- Azura Skye as Leann Cole
- Johnny Lewis as Brian Sousa
- Meagan Good as Shelley Baum
- Jason Beghe as Ray Purvis
- Margaret Cho as Mickey Lee
- Rhoda Griffis as Marie Layton
  - Dawn Dininger as The Ghost of Marie Layton
- Ariel Winter as Ellie Layton
  - Sarah Jean Kubik as The Ghost of Ellie Layton
- Raegan Lamb as Laurel Layton
- Karen Bayer as Mrs. Ford
- Dave Spector as Gary
- Mary Lynn Owen as Julie Cohn
- Roy McCrerey as Dr. Painter
- Greg Corbett as John
- Bart Hansard as Howie
- Katie Kneeland as Maddie
- Jason Horgan as Dr. Brown
- Kaira Akita as Jewel
- Laura Harring as Mrs. Raymond
- Wilbur Fitzgerald as Lieutenant
- Lauren Peyton as Reception Nurse

== Production ==
One Missed Call was announced in 2005, before being officially greenlit by Warner Bros. Pictures in early 2006, with Eric Valette signing as the film's director. The film began production in June in Atlanta, Georgia with Edward Burns, Margaret Cho, and Shannyn Sossamon signing on. On August 3, Ed Harris and Gabriel Byrne both signed on to appear in the film but both withdrew due to unknown circumstances.

Sound designers used the voice of Skid Row front man Sebastian Bach in the hospital basement scene. The exact clip comes from Bach's scream at the beginning of "Midnight / Tornado", a song from the band's 1989 debut album, Skid Row.

== Release ==
=== Marketing ===
In December 2007, the official website was launched as well as numerous websites running competitions to promote the film with the first prize being an Apple iPhone.

=== Theatrical ===
The film was intended for release on August 24, 2007, but was delayed until January 4, 2008. The song "Life is Beautiful" by Sixx:A.M. was used in television advertisements for the film.

=== Home media ===
The film was released on DVD, HD DVD, and Blu-ray on April 22, 2008.

== Reception ==
=== Critical reception ===
The film was not screened for critics. On the review aggregator website Rotten Tomatoes, 0% of 78 critics' reviews are positive, with an average rating of 2.6/10. The website's consensus reads: "One of the weakest entries in the J-horror remake sweepstakes, One Missed Call is undone by bland performances and shopworn shocks". It was also awarded the Moldy Tomato Award for being the worst-reviewed film of 2008 and is rated the second worst film of the 2000s decade behind Ballistic: Ecks vs. Sever. In 2023, the film topped the list of Rotten Tomatoes' top 100 worst movies of all time, along with Ballistic: Ecks vs. Sever and Left Behind. Metacritic, which uses a weighted average, assigned the film a score of 24 out of 100, based on 14 critics, indicating "generally unfavorable" reviews. Audiences surveyed by CinemaScore gave the film a grade "D" on scale of A+ to F.

Despite being a remake of Chakushin ari, the film was strongly criticized for borrowing plot elements from and being similar to Scream (1996), Final Destination (2000), The Ring (2002), The Grudge (2004), Dark Water (2005), and Pulse (2006).

The film received two nominations — Burns for Choice Movie Actor: Horror/Thriller and Sossamon for Choice Movie Actress: Horror/Thriller — at the 2008 Teen Choice Awards.

== Relationship with One Missed Call (2003 film) ==
One Missed Call includes most of the scenes and characters that were in the original 2003 film. These include the exorcism scene, where one of the characters is killed while filming the show American Miracles. The characters of Beth, Leann, Taylor, Jack, Brian, and Shelley are respectively based on the original characters Yumi, Yoko, Natsumi, Yamashita, Kenji, and Rina. Another reference is contained within the theatrical trailer; while Leann is walking down the street, a piece of the original ringtone from One Missed Call (2003) plays in the background until she falls from the overpass.

== See also ==
- List of films with a 0% rating on Rotten Tomatoes
- One Missed Call (2003 film), the original 2003 film
