= Five (Meisa Kuroki song) =

Single by Meisa Kuroki

from the album Magazine
- B-side: "The Only One, So Smooth"
- Released: June 2, 2010
- Genre: J-pop, dance-pop
- Length: 4:01
- Label: Studioseven Recordings
- Songwriters: Jeff Miyahara, Kanata Okajima

Meisa Kuroki singles chronology
"Shock -Unmei-" (2009)	"Five" (2010)	"LOL!" (2010)

" Five " is the second single by the Japanese singer Meisa Kuroki. The single was released in Japan on June 2, 2010 in two editions: CD+DVD and CD only and later added in Meisa's first album Magazine. It ranked #16 on the Oricon Daily Singles Сhart and #23 on the Oricon Weekly Singles Сhart with 4,188 copies sold in first week.

== Track list ==
No.	Title	Lyrics	Music	Length
1.	"5-FIVE-"	Jeff Miyahara, Kanata Okajima	Miyahara, Yuichi Hayashida	4:01
2.	"The Only One"	Nao'ymt	Nao'ymt	3:45
3.	"So Smooth"	MOMO "mocha" N.	U-Key Zone	4:26
4.	"5-FIVE- (Instrumental)"	Jeff Miyahara, Kanata Okajima	Miyahara, Hayashida	3:58
Total length:				16:09

DVD
No.	Title	Length
1.	"5 -FIVE-" (Music Video)
2.	"5 -FIVE-" (Dance Video)

== Charts ==
Chart	Peak position
Oricon Daily singles	16
Oricon Weekly singles	23
RIAJ Digital Track Chart	27

=== Sales and certifications ===
Chart	Amount
Oricon physical sales	5,000+
