= The Order (2003 film) =

- Directed by: Brian Helgeland
- Written by: Brian Helgeland
- Produced by: Craig Baumgarten; Brian Helgeland
- Starring: Heath Ledger; Shannyn Sossamon; Mark Addy; Benno Fürmann; Peter Weller
- Cinematography: Nicola Pecorini
- Edited by: Kevin Stitt
- Music by: David Torn
- Production company: Baumgarten Merims Films
- Distributed by: 20th Century Fox
- Release date: September 5, 2003
- Running time: 102 minutes
- Countries: Germany; United States
- Languages: Syriac; Aramaic; English; Italian
- Budget: $35 million
- Box office: $11,560,806

The Order (also known as The Sin Eater) is a 2003 mystery thriller film written and directed by Brian Helgeland, starring Heath Ledger, Benno Fürmann, Mark Addy, and Shannyn Sossamon. Helgeland directed Ledger, Addy and Sossamon in the 2001 film A Knight's Tale.

The film revolves around the investigation of the suspicious death of an excommunicated priest and the discovery of a Sin Eater headquartered in Rome.

The film was released through 20th Century Fox on September 5, 2003.

== Plot ==
Alex Bernier is a disillusioned priest and a member of the fictional Carolingian Order – an ancient sect that specializes in exorcisms and combatting demonic forces. The narrative begins with the mysterious death of Father Dominic – the head of the Carolingians, in Rome. Alex is dispatched by Cardinal Driscoll – a prominent Vatican official and papal candidate, to investigate the circumstances surrounding Dominic's demise.

Before his departure, Alex is approached by Mara Williams – an artist who he previously attempted to exorcise. Mara reveals that she senses impending danger for Alex. It is disclosed that during the exorcism, Mara attempted to kill Alex, and was subsequently imprisoned in a mental institution. Despite that history between them, Alex permits Mara to accompany him to Rome after she assures him that she poses no threat.

In Rome, Alex examines Dominic's corpse, and observes unusual markings, which he identifies as the work of a sin-eater – a figure that is capable of absolving sins outside of the Church's authority. Seeking assistance, Alex contacts his friend and fellow Carolingian priest, Thomas Garrett. The Vatican denies the existence of sin-eaters, and refuses to give Dominic a burial on consecrated ground, due to alleged excommunication. Defying orders, Alex conducts a clandestine funeral service for Dominic in the Carolingian cemetery.

Cardinal Driscoll arrives in Rome, and presents Alex with an ancient dagger and a fragmentary parchment that contains an Aramaic incantation. Believing these to be tools to eliminate the sin-eater, Alex and Thomas pursue further information. Their search leads them to a clandestine figure known as the Black Pope, who operates an underground sect. The Black Pope instructs Alex to seek answers from dying people, and he orchestrates a scenario in which three men are hanged. One of the dying men provides a riddle that guides Alex to a meeting with the sin-eater.

During their escape from the Black Pope's domain, Thomas is injured by demonic entities, and Alex brings him to a hospital. Alex then encounters the sin-eater, William Eden, at St. Peter's Basilica. Eden, weary after centuries of service, expresses a desire for Alex to succeed him. Intrigued but conflicted, Alex assists Eden in a sin-eating ritual but ultimately declines the offer, deciding to leave the priesthood to pursue a relationship with Mara.

Unbeknownst to Alex, Eden visits Mara and inflicts fatal wounds, making it appear as a suicide attempt. Discovering her near death and beyond medical help, Alex performs the sin-eating ritual to ensure her passage to heaven. Realizing that Mara did not kill herself, Alex deduces Eden's manipulation, and resolves to confront him.

Meanwhile, Thomas uncovers that the Black Pope is actually Cardinal Driscoll. Driscoll reveals the complete parchment, which outlines the true purpose of the dagger and incantation, which is not to kill the sin-eater, but to transfer his powers to a successor. Driscoll prevents Thomas from warning Alex of this revelation.

Alex confronts Eden and, following the supposed instructions to eliminate him, stabs Eden with the dagger while reciting the incantation. Eden dies, and the sin-eating powers are inadvertently transferred to Alex. Thomas arrives too late to prevent the transfer, and informs Alex of Driscoll's deceit. It becomes apparent that Dominic, Eden, and Driscoll orchestrated events to manipulate Alex into becoming the new sin-eater: Eden sought release from his burden; Driscoll desired the papacy; and Dominic aimed to access forbidden knowledge.

Alex exposes Driscoll's machinations to the Church, leading to the Cardinal's downfall. Facing ruin, Driscoll attempts suicide, and summons Alex to absolve his sins. Instead, Alex forces Driscoll to confront his own corruption, refusing to perform the ritual. Embracing his new role, Alex decides to use his abilities as a force for good, by offering salvation to people who he deems worthy, and denying it to people who are unrepentant.

== Cast ==
- Heath Ledger as Father Alex Bernier
- Shannyn Sossamon as Mara Williams
- Benno Fürmann as William Eden
- Mark Addy as Father Thomas Garrett
- Peter Weller as Cardinal Driscoll
- Francesco Carnelutti as Dominic
- Adam Toomer as Chuck Lowery

== Reception ==
On the review aggregator website Rotten Tomatoes, 10% of 61 critics' reviews are positive, with an average rating of 3.1/10. The website's consensus reads: "A religious thriller that's more lethargic and silly than thrilling." Metacritic, which uses a weighted average, assigned the film a score of 21 out of 100, based on 17 critics, indicating "generally unfavorable" reviews.

Peter Travers of Rolling Stone described the film as "The Exorcist warmed over" and suggested that Helgeland had more fun with the cast in A Knight's Tale than The Order. Stephen Holden of The New York Times called it "a murky ecclesiastical horror film" and added that it was "so entranced by its own bogus solemnity that most of what passes for conversation is language warped into the heavy-breathing pontification of prophecy delivered in thudding Charlton Heston-style cadences." Owen Gleiberman of Entertainment Weekly gave a more scathing review, calling it "so lethargic that I began to think of watching it as a form of atonement."
