= Yasushi Akimoto =

Japanese producer and lyricist (born 1958)

Yasushi Akimoto 秋元 康
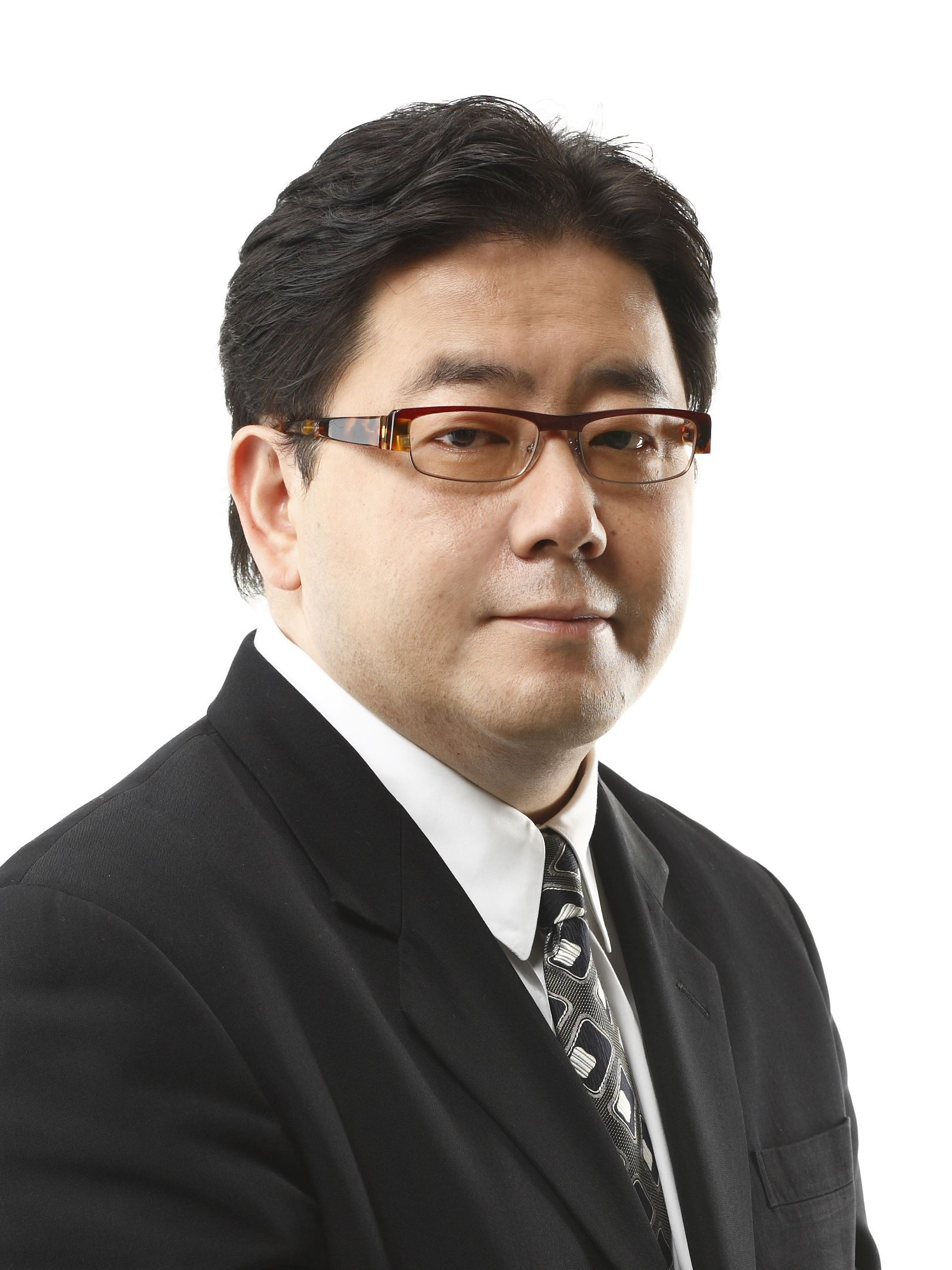
- Akimoto in 2007

Background information
- Born: May 2, 1958 (age 68); Meguro, Tokyo, Japan
- Genre: Japanese pop
- Occupations: Record producer; lyricist; television writer
- Years active: 1973–present
- Label: Fujipacific Music

Yasushi Akimoto (Japanese: 秋元 康, Hepburn: Akimoto Yasushi; born May 2, 1958) is a Japanese record producer, lyricist, and television writer, best known for creating and producing some of Japan's top idol groups, Onyanko Club and the AKB48 franchise. Total sales of the singles he has written exceed 100 million copies, making him the best-selling lyricist in Japan.

== Career ==
Akimoto created the Chakushin Ari (One Missed Call) horror franchise, which began with his novel of the same name and was first brought to film in 2003 before being remade by Hollywood in 2008. He wrote both the novel and the screen adaptation for One Missed Call: Final.

Akimoto became a television writer in high school, he has produced many television programs, such as Utaban.

Akimoto started as a lyricist with The Alfee in 1981; he has written lyrics for various artists such as Kinki Kids, Tunnels, Onyanko Club, AKB48, SKE48, SDN48, NMB48, HKT48, NGT48, STU48, Nogizaka46 and Keyakizaka46. He also wrote Hibari Misora's last single during her lifetime, "Kawa no Nagare no Yō ni", and Jero's debut single "Umi Yuki".

He debuted the 1st international sister group of AKB48 called JKT48. Auditions were held on October 8 and 9, 2011 and the official members were announced early November. And the 2nd international sister group of AKB48 called SNH48 was announced in October 2012. In June 2016 it was announced that SNH48 and its sister groups became fully independent from AKB48 having BEJ48, GNZ48, SHY48 and CKG48 as SNH48's Local Sister Groups which formed an alliance known as SNH48 Group or Star48. The 3rd international sister group of AKB48 called BNK48 was announced on February 12, 2017. The 4th international sister group of AKB48 called TPE48 was announced on February 4, 2018. And MNL48 the 5th international sister group of AKB48, the 1st generation members were officially announced on April 28, 2018. Also on the same year, MUM48, AKB48 Team SH and SGO48 were formed too as 6th, 7th and 8th overseas sister groups respectively.

Akimoto also got involved in female professional wrestling, introducing wrestler Cutie Suzuki.

In 2007 he became a professor and vice president at Kyoto University of Art and Design.

On March 17, 2014, it was announced that Akimoto was named a member of the 2020 Tokyo Olympics Committee and was put in charge of producing the opening ceremony along with photographer Mika Ninagawa who has previously produced music videos for AKB48, including 2010's Heavy Rotation and 2013's Sayonara Crawl. A petition against his appointment has been created due his representing the "decline" of the Japanese entertainment industry, with 11,000 signatures as of March 23.

He also contributed in forming a South Korean girl group Iz*One with collaboration between AKS and Mnet.

In 2016, Japanese idol girl group multimedia project between Yasushi Akimoto, Aniplex, and Sony Music Records called 22/7 was formed. The project is described as "idols who transcend dimensions." The members consist of voice actresses who provide the voice and motion capture for their characters, as well as perform as a musical group.

In 2017, Akimoto co-founded the $4.50 Theater Company, in cooperation with the entertainment company Avex Inc.

As of 2019, Akimoto is no longer part of the AKS management and is involved only as the creative producer of AKB48 Groups. In September 2022, OVERSE announces the launch of its new idol group project, it will be a new kind of idol group with blockchain and metaverse concepts, and names Akimoto Yasushi as the idol group's general producer.

== Criticism ==
Akimoto has been criticized in the past for song lyrics that some consider to have misogynistic undertones. Specifically, the 2016 HKT48 song "Einstein yori Dianna Agron" was seen as an insult to women's intelligence.

== Personal life ==
Akimoto married Onyanko Club member Mamiko Takai in 1988. They had a daughter in 2001.

== Awards ==
- 2008: 41st Japan Lyricist Awards — Grand Prix (for the song "Umiyuki", performed by Jero)
- 2009: 51st Japan Record Award Special Award
- 2011: 16th The AMD Award — Grand Prize
- 2012: 54th Japan Record Award — Lyricist Award. 45th Japan Cable Award, Special Award.
- 2017: 19th Mnet Asian Music Awards — Inspired Achievement
- 2022: Medal with Purple Ribbon

== See also ==
- AKB48
- Nogizaka46
- AKB48 Group
- Sakamichi Series
- Nurse Angel Ririka SOS
- Songs with lyrics by Yasushi Akimoto
