= LOL! (Meisa Kuroki song) =

Single by Meisa Kuroki

from the album Magazine
- Released: October 3, 2010
- Length: 4:07
- Label: Sony
- Songwriters: Kaoru Kami; June
- Producer: June

Meisa Kuroki singles chronology
"5 (Five)" (2010)	"LOL!" (2010)	"One More Drama" (2011)

Alternative cover
- CD+DVD edition cover

"LOL!" is a song by Japanese fashion model, actress and musician Meisa Kuroki, released as her third physical single in early October, 2010. The song, as of 2010, is her most popular single, outselling her other singles in terms of physical copies, and also being her only single to receive a digital download certification from RIAJ.

== Promotion ==
The song was used in commercials for Kit Kats in Japan, in 2010. Kuroki set up an official Twitter account, https://twitter.com/Meisa_Kuroki, on September 7 in promotion for the single. Originally, Kuroki intended to only use the Twitter account for a month, until October 7, however is currently still using the service. She promoted the single with two handshake events on October 9 held on the same day, one in Shinjuku, Tokyo and one in Nishinomiya.

Kuroki appeared on TV shows Music Lovers, Music Japan and Sakigake! Ongaku Banzuke Eight in promotion of the event. She also appeared on radio shows on Tokyo FM, most notably Love Connection four times throughout October. Kuroki was featured in many magazines to promote the single, such as 25ans, Floor, Nikkei Magazine, Gyao Magazine, Ori Star, Sweet and WWD Japan.

== Music video ==
Meisa Kuroki in the music video

The music video was directed by Shigeaki Kubo. It was initially aired on the internet on September 11, for a limited period of 24 hours. The video features Kuroki in a summery room, reclined on the floor reading a magazine, along with several other girls. Interspersed with these scenes are Kuroki and two back-up dancers in a monochrome room, as well as scenes inside a red cluttered room, in which Kuroki stands in a bath-tub. Occasional 3D speech bubbles appear with the lyrics of the song around Kuroki, as well as other computer graphics.

== Track listing ==
No.	Title	Lyrics	Music	Length
1.	"LOL!"	Kaoru Kami	June	4:07
2.	"Be Like That"	Momo "Mocha" N.	U-Key Zone	4:41
3.	"LOL! (Instrumental)"	Kami	June	4:04
4.	"Be Like That (Instrumental)"	Momo "Mocha" N.	U-Key Zone	4:39
Total length:				17:31

DVD
No.	Title	Director	Length
1.	"LOL! (Music Video)"	Shigeaki Kubo
2.	"Special Making of LOL!"

== Chart rankings ==
Chart	Peak position
Billboard Japan Hot 100	62
Oricon weekly singles	12
RIAJ Digital Track Chart Top 100	4

=== Sales and certifications ===
Chart	Amount
Oricon physical sales	12,000
RIAJ full-length cellphone downloads	Gold (100,000+)

== Personnel ==
- D.O.I. (Daimonion Recordings) - Mixing
- June (Wazz Up) - all instruments, music, production, programming, vocal production
- Kaoru Kami - lyrics
- Neeraj Khajanchi (Nippon no Kokoro Sound) - Recording, at Studio Empoint
- Meisa Kuroki - vocals

== Release history ==
Region	Date	Format
Japan	September 25, 2010	Ringtone
Japan	October 3, 2010	Full-length cellphone download
Japan	October 6, 2010	CD single, CD+DVD single, rental CD
