= Attitude (Meisa Kuroki EP) =

EP by Meisa Kuroki
- Released: January 1, 2010
- Recorded: 2009
- Genres: Pop, R&B
- Length: 27:25
- Label: Studioseven Recordings

Meisa Kuroki chronology
Hellcat (2009)	Attitude (2010)	Magazine (2011)

Alternative cover
- Limited edition cover

Attitude is Japanese pop singer and actress Meisa Kuroki's first EP. It was released on January 1, 2010, by her record label Studioseven Recordings.

== Track listing ==
All lyrics are written by Momo "Mocha" N.; all music is composed by U-Key Zone.

No.	Title	Length
1.	"Attitude (Intro)"	0:46
2.	"Are Ya Ready?"	3:54
3.	"Kind of Guy"	4:02
4.	"#1"	4:18
5.	"No Restriction (Interlude)"	0:45
6.	"Late Show"	4:27
7.	"Stand Up!"	3:32
8.	"Before Dawn (Interlude)"	0:30
9.	"Awakening"	5:08

Limited edition DVD
No.	Title	Length
1.	"Are Ya Ready?" (Music Video)

== Charts ==
=== Oricon sales charts ===
Release	Chart	Peak position	Debut sales	Sales total
January 1, 2010	Oricon Daily Albums Chart	29		5,507
January 1, 2010	Oricon Weekly Albums Chart	49	5,507	5,507
