= Unlocked (Meisa Kuroki album) =

Studio album by Meisa Kuroki
- Released: February 15, 2012
- Recorded: 2011
- Genre: R&B; pop; J-pop
- Length: 59:53
- Label: Gr8! Records

Meisa Kuroki chronology
Magazine (2011)	Unlocked (2012)

Singles from Unlocked
- 1. "One More Drama" Released: April 13, 2011; 2. "Wired Life" Released: August 31, 2011; 3. "Woman's Worth / Breeze Out" Released: December 7, 2011

Unlocked is the second studio album by the Japanese singer, model and actress Meisa Kuroki. It was released on February 15, 2012 in 3 different editions: 2 limited CD+DVD editions (Type A comes with Music videos and Making-of and Type B with the live concert "The Magazine Show") and a Regular edition. Limited editions comes with a 40-pages photobook.

== Singles ==
The album has three singles. The first single of the album is the song "One More Drama", released on April 13, 2011. The single reached #18 in Oricon's Weekly chart with a total of more than 5,000 copies sold.

The second single is the song "Wired Life", released on August 31, 2011. The single reached #12 in Oricon's Weekly chart and sold more than 15,000 copies. At the date, is her most successful single. The song was chosen as ending theme song for the anime Ao no Exorcist.

The third and last single is the double A-side "Woman's Worth / Breeze Out", released on December 7, 2011. It is the first double A-side single of Meisa Kuroki's singer career. It peaked #47 in Oricon's Weekly chart with around 3,000 copies sold. At the date, is her lowest selling single.

== Track listing ==
All editions tracklist
No.	Title	Length
1.	"Hit the Road"	3:49
2.	"Shake it Off"	4:13
3.	"Wired Life"	4:41
4.	"One More Drama"	4:00
5.	"Take Me Away"	4:28
6.	"Flash Light"	4:05
7.	"Woman's Worth"	4:18
8.	"Breeze Out"	4:04
9.	"Last Code"	4:48
10.	"Happy To Be Me"	4:47
11.	"Parade"	4:14
12.	"S.O.S -Watashi Sagasanai de Kudasai-" (S.O.S-ワタシサガサナイデクダサイ-)	4:08
13.	"Upgrade U!"	3:42
14.	"Aimai de Zeitaku na Yokubou" (曖昧で贅沢な欲望)	4:46
Total length:		59:53

DVD (Type A)
No.	Title	Length
1.	"One More Drama" (Music video)
2.	"One More Drama" (Music video - Special Making of)
3.	"Wired Life" (Music video)
4.	"Wired Life" (Music video - Special Making of)
5.	"Woman's Worth" (Music video)
6.	"Woman's Worth" (Music video - Special Making of)
7.	"Breeze Out" (Music video)
8.	"Breeze Out" (Music video - Special Making of)

DVD (Type B: The Magazine Show)
No.	Title	Length
1.	"Loveholic"
2.	"Switch"
3.	"Tour Documentary Osaka"
4.	"Criminal"
5.	"Are Ya Ready?"
6.	"Tour Documentary Nagoya"
7.	"Wired Life"
8.	"Woman's Worth"
9.	"5-Five-"
10.	"One More Drama"
11.	"Tour Documentary Tokyo"
12.	"Upgrade U!"
13.	"Tour Documentary Fukuoka"

== Charts ==
=== Oricon ===
Released	Oricon Chart	Peak	Debut sales	Sales total
February 15, 2012	Daily Albums Chart	7	5,862	7,001
February 15, 2012	Weekly Albums Chart	18	5,862	7,001

=== Other charts ===
Chart	Peak position
Billboard Japan Top Albums	22

== Release history ==
Country	Date	Format	Label
Japan	February 15, 2012	CD, Digital download	Gr8! Records
