= Hellcat (EP) =

EP by Meisa Kuroki
- Released: April 8, 2009
- Recorded: 2008–2009
- Genre: R&B, pop
- Length: 30:46
- Label: Sony

Meisa Kuroki chronology
| Hellcat (2009) | Attitude (2010) |

Alternative cover
- Limited edition cover

Singles from Hellcat
- 1. "Like This" Released: June 21, 2008

Hellcat is Meisa Kuroki's debut mini-album, released on April 8, 2009. It peaked at #9 on the weekly Oricon albums chart.

== Track listing ==
| No. | Title | Lyrics | Music | Length |
|---|---|---|---|---|
| 1. | "Hear the Alarm?" | Momo "Mocha" N. | U-Key Zone | 4:12 |
| 2. | "Like This" | Kami Kaoru | Kami Kaoru | 3:34 |
| 3. | "Bad Girl" | U-ka | June | 3:57 |
| 4. | "Criminal" | Tiger | Meisa, Jeff Miyahara | 3:34 |
| 5. | "No, No, No" | Momo "Mocha" N. | Momo "Mocha" N. | 3:47 |
| 6. | "Sex" | Shoko Fujibayashi, Jeff Miyahara | Meisa, Jeff Miyahara | 4:08 |
| 7. | "Lost" | Yūki Shirai, Mika Arata, Jeff Miyahara | Meisa, Jeff Miyahara, Kenji "Jino" Hino | 3:19 |
| 8. | "This Is Crazy" | Momo "Mocha" N. | U-Key Zone | 4:12 |

Limited edition DVD
| No. | Title | Length |
|---|---|---|
| 1. | "Like This" (Music Video) |
| 2. | "Bad Girl" (Music Video) |
| 3. | "Criminal" (Music Video) |

== Charts ==
=== Oricon sales charts ===
| Release | Chart | Peak position | First day/week sales | Sales total |
|---|---|---|---|---|
| April 8, 2009 | Oricon Daily Albums Chart | 5 | | |
| April 8, 2009 | Oricon Weekly Albums Chart | 9 | 11,048 | 20,430 |
| April 8, 2009 | Oricon Monthly Albums Chart | 26 | | |

=== Other charts ===
| Chart | Peak position |
|---|---|
| Soundscan Albums Chart (CD+DVD) | 13 |
