= One Missed Call (2003 film) =

2003 horror film by Takashi Miike

- Theatrical release poster
- Directed by: Takashi Miike
- Screenplay by: Minako Daira
- Based on: Chakushin Ari by Yasushi Akimoto
- Produced by: Yoichi Arishige; Fumio Inoue; Naoki Satō
- Starring: Ko Shibasaki; Shinichi Tsutsumi; Kazue Fukiishi; Goro Kishitani; Renji Ishibashi
- Cinematography: Hideo Yamamoto
- Edited by: Yasushi Shimamura
- Music by: Kōji Endō
- Production company: Kadokawa-Daiei Eiga
- Distributed by: Toho
- Release date: November 3, 2003 (Tokyo International Film Festival); January 17, 2004 (Japan)
- Running time: 112 minutes
- Country: Japan
- Language: Japanese
- Budget: $1.7 million
- Box office: $16.2 million

One Missed Call (Japanese: 着信アリ, Hepburn: Chakushin ari) is a 2003 Japanese horror film directed by Takashi Miike. The film is based on the novel Chakushin Ari by Yasushi Akimoto. The plot revolves around Yumi Nakamura, a young psychology student whose friend Yoko gets a strange voice message on her cell phone, foretelling her death. When more people receive calls with the date and time of their deaths, Yumi struggles to save them and learn the truth behind the calls.

In 2008, the film was remade into a critically panned English-language adaptation.

== Plot ==
While out at a mixer with friends, Yoko Okazaki misses a call on her cell phone, playing a peculiar ringtone different from her usual one, and notices the caller ID says it came from her own number. She and her friend Yumi Nakamura listen to the message left on the phone, dated two days into the future, and hear Yoko's voice say that it's starting to rain, followed by a horrendous scream. Two days later, Yumi gets a call from Yoko and realizes that Yoko is saying the words they heard in the voice mail. Yoko screams as she is violently thrown off an overpass onto a speeding train. Her severed hand is then seen dialing a number. Although authorities assume suicide, her schoolmates recall similar deaths that were preceded by voicemails. Yoko's new boyfriend Kenji Kawai tells Yumi he got a voicemail from himself dated two days later, with a timestamp two minutes from now. As Yumi looks on, Kenji is inexplicably pulled down an elevator shaft. As he bleeds to death on the bottom, a red jawbreaker falls out of his mouth as his phone dials another number by itself.

A nervous Yumi invites her friend Natsumi Konishi to stay with her. Yumi turns both of their cell phones off, but Natsumi still receives a call from her own number and receives a photo instead of a voice mail, showing herself with a shadowy figure behind her. The media picks up on the story and offers Natsumi a chance to be exorcised on live TV. Despite Yumi's protests, Natsumi anxiously agrees.

Yumi meets Hiroshi Yamashita, a detective who has been investigating the curse that also claimed the life of his sister Ritsuko. Yamashita shares that the next victim is called one minute after the previous death, and victims are found with red jawbreakers in their mouths. Their investigation leads them to a hospital which has since changed its building and number. Yumi recognizes a sound she heard before Kenji's death as the spraying of an asthma inhaler. They trace the autopsy records to a girl named Mimiko Mizunuma who died from an asthma attack and whose mother Marie went missing. Ritsuko's journal shows that whenever Mimiko had an attack, her sister Nanako would suffer some injury at the same time. They suspect that Marie had Munchausen syndrome by proxy and harmed her own children for attention.

The night of Natsumi's exorcism goes horribly wrong. Yumi and Yamashita barge into the studio to see the exorcist be violently blown back by an invisible force and Natsumi die after her limbs are contorted at impossible angles, after which a jawbreaker drops out of her mouth, and a cursed voicemail arrives for Yumi. When Yamashita escorts her home and encourages her to stay with her family, she reveals to Yamashita that her mother abused her as a child.

At an orphanage, Yamashita meets Nanako, who will not speak but has a teddy bear that plays the same melody as the ringtone from the calls to the victims. Yumi goes to the abandoned hospital alone and encounters the spirit of Mimiko. She receives a text message saying she will die in under a minute. Unable to reach Yumi, Yamashita races to the hospital and finds an arm clutching a cell phone, which he turns off. After the minute elapses, Yamashita uncovers a crate containing Marie's body. It comes to life, and Yumi sees her own abusive mother in Marie. She tearfully embraces her, apologizing for leaving, and Marie's body collapses again.

Yumi goes home and Yamashita is called back to the police station, where a video tape found at the Mizunumas' abandoned apartment reveals that the one abusing Nanako was Mimiko. Marie came home and caught Mimiko slashing Nanako's arm with a knife, whereupon Mimiko had an asthma attack and collapsed. The horrified Marie rushed Nanako to the hospital and left Mimiko alone to die. Yamashita goes to Nanako and tells her he knows the truth about the abuse, and speaking for the first time, Nanako tells him that Mimiko would give her candy for being silent about the abuse. In Yumi's apartment, her clock starts ticking backward to the time of her death the voice mail foretold, and Mimiko appears. When Yamashita arrives, he finds Yumi in an apparently normal state and embraces her, but is stabbed and sees Yumi appearing as Mimiko in the mirror. After a dream in which he helps the dying Mimiko with an inhaler, he wakes in a hospital bed to find Yumi at his bedside. Holding a knife behind her back, she kisses him and pushes a jawbreaker into his mouth, then smiles, implying that in Yamashita she has found a new Nanako to "care" for.

== Cast ==
Character	Japanese actor	English voice actor
Yumi Nakamura	Ko Shibasaki	Kate Davis
Hiroshi Yamashita	Shinichi Tsutsumi	Liam O'Brien
Natsumi Konishi	Kazue Fukiishi	Jennifer Sekiguchi
Ichiro Fujieda	Yutaka Matsushige	Kim Strauss
Oka	Goro Kishitani	Joey Capps
Detective Yusaku Motomiya	Renji Ishibashi	Michael McConnohie

== Production ==
According to the producer Yoichi Arishige, productions of One Missed Call and the 2004 film Install were influenced by cancelled projects by Daiei Film.

== Release ==
One Missed Call premiered at the Tokyo International Film Festival on November 3, 2003. Its English title was listed as You've Got a Call at the festival. It was later released theatrically in Japan on January 17, 2004, where it was distributed by Toho. In the Philippines, it was released by Buena Vista International on December 8 the same year. It was released by Media Blasters in the United States with English subtitles on April 22, 2005.

In February 2020, Arrow Films released One Missed Call on Blu-ray in the United Kingdom, the United States and Canada.

== Critical reception ==
On the review aggregator website Rotten Tomatoes, 46% of 26 critics' reviews are positive. The website's consensus reads: "One Missed Call has a few interesting ideas and benefits from director Takashi Miike's eye, but is ultimately too unoriginal to recommend." Metacritic, which uses a weighted average, assigned the film a score of 54 out of 100, based on 11 critics, indicating "mixed or average" reviews.

Entertainment Weekly wrote, "One Missed Call is so unoriginal that the movie could almost be a parody of J-horror tropes", yet "Miike, for a while at least, stages it with a dread-soaked visual flair that allows you to enjoy being manipulated". Dana Stevens of The New York Times mentions that "[the film] staggers under the weight of its director's taste for baroque excess".

According to Nick Schager of Slant Magazine, the film is "[a] mainstream J-horror flick that dutifully regurgitates the apparitions, aesthetic, and themes of its genre predecessors".

== Sequels and remake ==
The film was followed up with the sequel One Missed Call 2 which was released in 2005. One Missed Call, a ten-episode Japanese television drama was broadcast in 2005. One Missed Call: Final was released in Japan on 24 June 2006.

The film was remade in English as One Missed Call, released in 2008.
