= Goran Dukić =

Croatian film director

- Born: Zagreb, SR Croatia, Yugoslavia
- Occupations: Film director, screenwriter, actor, film editor
- Years active: 1991–present

Goran Dukić is a Croatian film director, screenwriter and actor best known for writing and directing the 2006 film Wristcutters: A Love Story.

== Early life ==
Born in Zagreb, Croatia, Dukić says that as a child he enjoyed telling stories and was keen to express himself visually, so—not finding painting, writing or theater "dynamic" enough—he became interested in filmmaking and made many amateur short films as a teenager. His 1991 short film Mirta uči statistiku ("Myrtha Learns Statistics") and his 1992 short documentary Posebni gosti ("Special Guests") screened at Croatian film festivals, the latter winning the Oktavijan Award for Best Short Film from the Days of Croatian Film. He attended the Academy of Dramatic Arts in Zagreb, graduating with a Bachelor of Arts degree in film, later completing a Master of Fine Arts at the American Film Institute Conservatory in Hollywood, California in the United States.

== Career ==
After relocating to Los Angeles, California, Dukić directed the 2001 short How I Saved the World, and directed and edited the 2002 short The Yellow House. He edited and starred as Brian Riley in the 2004 film Dead Doll.

Dukić wrote and directed the 2006 film Wristcutters: A Love Story, based on Etgar Keret's short story "Kneller’s Happy Campers" and about a world in the afterlife reserved for suicide victims. He had contacted Keret immediately after reading the novella and asked for the rights to the story, but Dukić was turned away with Keret telling him that he had other film-adaptation offers from French and German filmmakers and would only give away the rights if he was shown a complete screenplay that he felt did the story justice. Keret was impressed by Dukić's screenplay and gave him permission to make the film. Dukić's main storyline was the same as the original story, but he added many of his own details to the film, such as the characters not being able to smile in the afterworld and the absence of stars in the night sky. In writing the script and directing the film, Dukić says his goal was to "preserve [the novella's] essence but yet to add as much of my own sensibility and vision to make it a personal movie".

Dukić's next project was a murder mystery film involving identity crisis, based on his first screenplay, "I Could Be You". He lists his creative inspirations as film directors Luis Buñuel, Robert Altman, François Truffaut, Jean-Luc Godard, Martin Scorsese, Roman Polanski, Dušan Makavejev, Jim Jarmusch, Rainer Werner Fassbinder, Akira Kurosawa, Robert Aldrich, Andrei Tarkovsky, Samuel Fuller, Wim Wenders and David Lynch.

== Awards ==
- Days of Croatian Film
  - 1991 – Oktavijan Award for Best Short Film, Mirta uči statistiku (Won)
- Gen Art Film Festival
  - 2006 – Best Feature, Wristcutters: A Love Story (Won)
- Gotham Awards
  - 2006 – Best Film Not Playing at a Theater Near You, Wristcutters: A Love Story (Nominated)
- Hamptons International Film Festival
  - 2001 – Student Film Award, How I Saved the World (Won)
- Humanitas Prize
  - 2006 – Humanitas Prize (Sundance Film Category), Wristcutters: A Love Story (Nominated)
- Independent Spirit Awards
  - 2006 – Best First Feature, Wristcutters: A Love Story (Nominated)
  - 2006 – Best First Screenplay, Wristcutters: A Love Story (Nominated)
- Motovun Film Festival
  - 2006 – Audience Award, Wristcutters: A Love Story (Won)
  - 2006 – Propeller of Motovun, Wristcutters: A Love Story (Won)
- Philadelphia Film Festival
  - 2006 – Best First Time Director, Wristcutters: A Love Story (Won)
  - 2006 – Jury Award, Wristcutters: A Love Story (Won)
- Seattle International Film Festival
  - 2006 – Golden Space Needle Award, Wristcutters: A Love Story (Won)
- Sundance Film Festival
  - 2006 – Grand Jury Prize, Wristcutters: A Love Story (Nominated)
- Wisconsin Film Festival
  - 2006 – Audience Award for Best Narrative Film, Wristcutters: A Love Story (Won)
