= June (singer) =

- Born: January 2, 1987 (age 39); Seoul, South Korea
- Label: Sony Music Japan
- Website: http://official.stardust.co.jp/june/

Hyun Jun (주현준, born January 2, 1987), better known as June, is a solo R&B singer under Sony Music Japan. He is Korean by birth, but his career consists of producing mostly Japanese music and original soundtracks for anime. His biggest contribution to Japanese music has been through his two biggest singles for the soundtracks of popular shōnen anime during the early 2000's.

His first single, "Baby It's You", was used as the ninth ending theme for the anime Bleach. His second single, "Pride of Tomorrow", was the second ending theme for the anime D.Gray-Man.

== Early life and career ==
=== 2004–2006 ===
At the age of 17, June recorded a cover of Musiq's "Love". This song reached Matsuo "KC" Kiyoshi, a well-known R&B producer, who then flew to Korea to meet June. June studied Japanese for a year to prepare, and then he made his major debut under Sony Music Japan in November 2006 at the age of 19.

=== 2006–2009 ===
He was featured on the 12th track of TBNY's first album Masquerade (매스퀘레이드, 가장), released in 2006, with the song titled 왜 서있어 or "Why Are You Standing". June also helped to arrange, compose and produce songs for Kuroki Meisa, K, and South Korea actor/singer Jang Keun-suk. He then released his biggest hit "Baby It's You" for anime Bleach in 2006, and following that up with the original soundtracks Pride of Tomorrow in 2007, You and Me in 2007, and Always in 2009.

=== 2012 – present ===
As of 2012, June is performing in the Japanese R&B trio Wazz Up.

== Discography ==
=== Singles ===
- [2006.11.15] Baby It's You / DISCOTHEQUE☆ROMANTIC (Baby It's You/ディスコティック☆ロマンティック)
- [2007.03.07] Pride of Tomorrow
- [2007.07.11] You and Me
- [2009.03.11] Always

=== Albums ===
- [2008.06.18] I.L.X

=== Production contributions ===
- [2006] 왜 서있어 (why are you standing)
