= Meisa Kuroki =

Japanese actress, model and singer

Meisa Kuroki 黒木 メイサ
- Born: Satsuki Shimabukuro 島袋 さつき; 28 May 1988 (age 38); Nago, Okinawa, Japan
- Occupations: Actress; singer; model
- Years active: 2004–present
- Height: 1.65 m (5 ft 5 in)
- Spouse: Jin Akanishi (m. 2012; div. 2023)
- Children: 2

Satsuki Shimabukuro (Japanese: 島袋 さつき, Shimabukuro Satsuki, Born on May 28, 1988 in Okinawa Prefecture, Japan), better known by her stage name Meisa Kuroki (Japanese: 黒木 メイサ, Kuroki Meisa), is a Japanese actress, model and singer. She is represented by the agency Sweet Power and is signed to Sony Music Japan. She made her acting debut in 2004. She has modeled for the popular Japanese fashion magazine JJ, among others, and is the current Japanese representative for Epson and Giorgio Armani. She has appeared in numerous television dramas, commercials, films, and stage productions.

Kuroki released her debut single "Like This" in 2008, followed by the extended play Hellcat (2009). Her debut studio album, Magazine (2011) peaked at number six on the Oricon and featured her first top fifteen single, "LOL!". Kuroki is best known for the song "Wired Life", which served as an ending theme for the anime series Blue Exorcist. It was included on her second studio album, Unlocked (2012). Since its release, Kuroki has focused solely on her acting career.

== Early life and career ==
Kuroki was born Satsuki Shimabukuro in Okinawa, Japan. While in her second year of junior high school in Okinawa, Kuroki was discovered by a fashion scout and subsequently began modeling, initially modeling exclusively for the popular fashion magazine JJ. While studying at the Okinawa Actors School, from which she graduated in 2007, she was a member of the institution's B.B. Waves group. Kuroki is one-quarter Brazilian.

=== Acting career ===
Kuroki made her acting debut in February 2004 in the Kōhei Tsuka play Atami Satsujin Jiken: Pyonyang Kara Kita Onna Keiji (The Atami Murder Case.) Since her debut she has continued to perform in theater, notably in the Azumi stage productions in 2005 and 2006, the musical Endless Shock (2005), and most recently in Onna Nobunaga (2009) and Hiryuden 2010: Last Princess (2010). Kuroki made her television debut in 2004 in the Fuji TV drama, Medaka. She has played supporting roles in several high-rated and critically acclaimed drama series, including Haikei, Chichiue-sama (2007), Kaze no Garden (2008), and Shinzanmono (2010). Kuroki won the Television Drama Academy Award and TV Life Annual Drama Awards for Best Supporting Actress in 2009 for her role in the Fuji TV drama, Ninkyo Helper. In 2006, she starred in Chakushin Ari: Final, the final installment of the Chakushin Ari franchise, for which she earned the Golden Arrow Award for Newcomer of the Year. In 2007 she appeared in Fumihiko Sori's CGI anime film Vexille. She also starred in Subaru, the live-action, film adaptation of the Masahito Soda manga, produced by Bill Kong, and Assault Girls, directed by Mamoru Oshii. In 2010, Kuroki played the role of Yuki Mori in the live-action film Space Battleship Yamato, opposite Takuya Kimura. In 2011, Kuroki co-starred with Mikako Tabe in her first serial drama lead role in the TV Asahi drama Jiu: Keishicho Tokushuhan Sosakei. In 2011, she also starred in the film "ANDALUCIA" by director Hiroshi Nishitani, who also shared roles with the acclaimed Hideaki Ito and Yuyi Oda. This film was shot at the legendary Toho Studios, where the iconic film Godzilla was filmed decades ago.

=== Music career ===
Kuroki performed on the soundtrack of the 2007 film Crows Zero, in which she also appeared. On June 21, 2008, her debut song, "Like This", was released through the Sony Music Japan subsidiary label Studioseven Recordings. It soon was announced on February 17, 2009, that Kuroki's first EP, Hellcat, would be released on April 8, 2009. Her second EP, Attitude, was released in January 2010. In January 2011 Kuroki released her first studio album, Magazine, which peaked at number 6 on the Oricon Weekly Albums chart. She also performed "Wired Life" for Ao no Exorcist as the second ending theme.

=== Modeling ===
In addition to her modeling work for the fashion magazines JJ and 25ans, Kuroki has released two photobooks, one of her own, Love Meisa, and a joint one, Missmatch, with her best friend and actress, Maki Horikita, photographed by Kishin Shinoyama. In 2009, Kuroki was chosen as the Japanese face of international fashion brand, Emporio Armani, and she also appeared in numerous events for the brand worldwide. In 2010 Kuroki was chosen as the international face of French cosmetic brand, L'Oréal.

== Personal life ==
On February 2, 2012, Kuroki married Jin Akanishi, a Japanese actor and pop singer best known for his work as part of the boy band KAT-TUN, and the following week, on 9 February, the media reported she was pregnant. She gave birth to their first child, a daughter named Theia, on September 23, 2012 and their second child, a son, on June 6, 2017. On December 25, 2023, Kuroki and Akanishi announced through their respective social media accounts that they were getting divorced. The two promised to co-parent their two children.

== Discography ==
=== Albums ===
- Magazine (2011)
- Unlocked (2012)

== Filmography ==
=== Film ===
| Title | Year | Role | Notes |
|---|---|---|---|
| Onaji Tsuki o Mite Iru | 2005 | Emi Sugiyama | |
| Camus Nante Shiranai | 2006 | Rei | |
| Chakushin Ari: Final | 2006 | Emiri Kusama | Also known as One Missed Call: Final |
| Tada, Kimi o Aishiteru | 2006 | Miyuki Toyama | |
| Taitei no Ken | 2007 | Botan | |
| Vexille: 2077 Nihon Sakoku | 2007 | Vexille | Voice |
| Crows Zero | 2007 | Ruka Aizawa | |
| Subaru | 2009 | Subaru Miyamoto | |
| Crows Zero 2 | 2009 | Ruka Aizawa | |
| Assault Girls | 2009 | Gray | |
| Yazima Beauty Salon | 2010 | Raspberry | |
| Space Battleship Yamato | 2010 | Yuki Mori | |
| Andalucia: Megami no Hōfuku | 2011 | Yuka Shindō | |
| Kirin no Tsubasa | 2012 | Ami Aoyama | |
| Lupin III | 2014 | Fujiko Mine | |
| Fist & Faith | 2017 | | Chinese film |

=== Television ===
| Title | Year | Role | Notes |
|---|---|---|---|
| Medaka | 2004 | Asuka Yoshizumi | |
| Honto ni Atta Kowai Hanashi | 2004 | Eriko Mitsuhashi | Season 2, Episode 21 |
| Koisuru Nichiyōbi: Bungaku no Uta | 2005 | Keiko Yokoyama | Episode 1 |
| Aru Ai no Uta | 2006 | Ruka Kashiwagi | |
| Haikei, Chichiue-sama | 2007 | Naomi Karasawa | |
| Byakkotai | 2007 | Sayoko Asai | TV movie |
| Seitosho-kun | 2007 | Yūko Sonoi | Episode 1 |
| 1-Pound no Fukuin | 2008 | Sister Angela | |
| Tobira wa Tozasareta Mama | 2008 | Yuka Usui | TV movie |
| Kaze no Garden | 2008 | Rui Shiratori | |
| Dansō no Reijin: Kawashima Yoshiko no Shōgai | 2008 | Young Yoshiko Kawashima | TV movie |
| Chance!: Kanojo ga Seikō Shita Riyū | 2009 | Saori Tamaki | TV movie |
| Ninkyo Helper | 2009–2011 | Riko Yomogi | 11 episodes 1 special TV Life Annual Drama Awards for Best Supporting Actress; Nominated—Nikkan Sports Drama Grand Prix for Best Supporting Actress; Nominated—The Television Drama Academy Award for Best Supporting Actress |
| Saigo no Yakusoku | 2010 | Yuriko Niimi | TV movie |
| Shinzanmono | 2010–2011 | Ami Aoyama | 10 episodes 1 special |
| Iris | 2010 | Seung-hee Choi | Japanese voice |
| Shiawase ni Narō yo | 2011 | Haruna Yanagisawa | |
| Jiu: Keishichou Tokushuhan Sousakei | 2011 | Motoko Isaki | |
| A Suffocatingly Lonely Death | 2024 | Asuka Gomi | |
| Reboot | 2026 | Mayu Gido | |

=== Theatre ===
| Title | Year | Role | Notes |
|---|---|---|---|
| Atami Satsujin Jiken: Pyonyang Kara Kita Onna Keiji | 2004 | Tomoko Mizuno | |
| Endless Shock | 2005 | Rika | |
| Azumi: Azumi on Stage | 2005 | Azumi | |
| Chōkyōshi | 2005 | Momo | |
| Azumi: Azumi Returns | 2004 | Azumi | |
| Itsu no Hi Ka Kimi Kaeru | 2007 | Lin | |
| Akai Shiro, Kuroi Suna | 2009 | Princess Nadja | |
| Onna Nobunaga | 2009 | Nobunaga Oda | |
| Hiryuden 2010: Last Princess | 2010 | Michiko Kanbayashi | |

== Accolades ==
=== Awards ===
| Year | Award | Category | Work(s) | Result | Ref. |
|---|---|---|---|---|---|
| 2009 | Elan d'or Awards | Newcomer of the Year | Herself | Won | |

=== Prizes ===
| Year | Prize |
|---|---|
| 2008 | Bvlgari Brilliant Dream Award |
| 2009 | Miss Cotton USA Prize |
| 2009 | FEC Special Prize |
| 2009 | Ms. Lily Prize |
| 2009 | Forevermark Prize |
| 2009 | Fur of the Year Prize |
| 2009 | Shogakukan Dime Trend Woman of the Year Prize |
| 2010 | Clarino Bikyaku Prize |
| 2010 | Vogue Nippon Women of the Year |
| 2010 | Japan Jewelry Best Dresser Prize |
