= Yuna Ito discography =

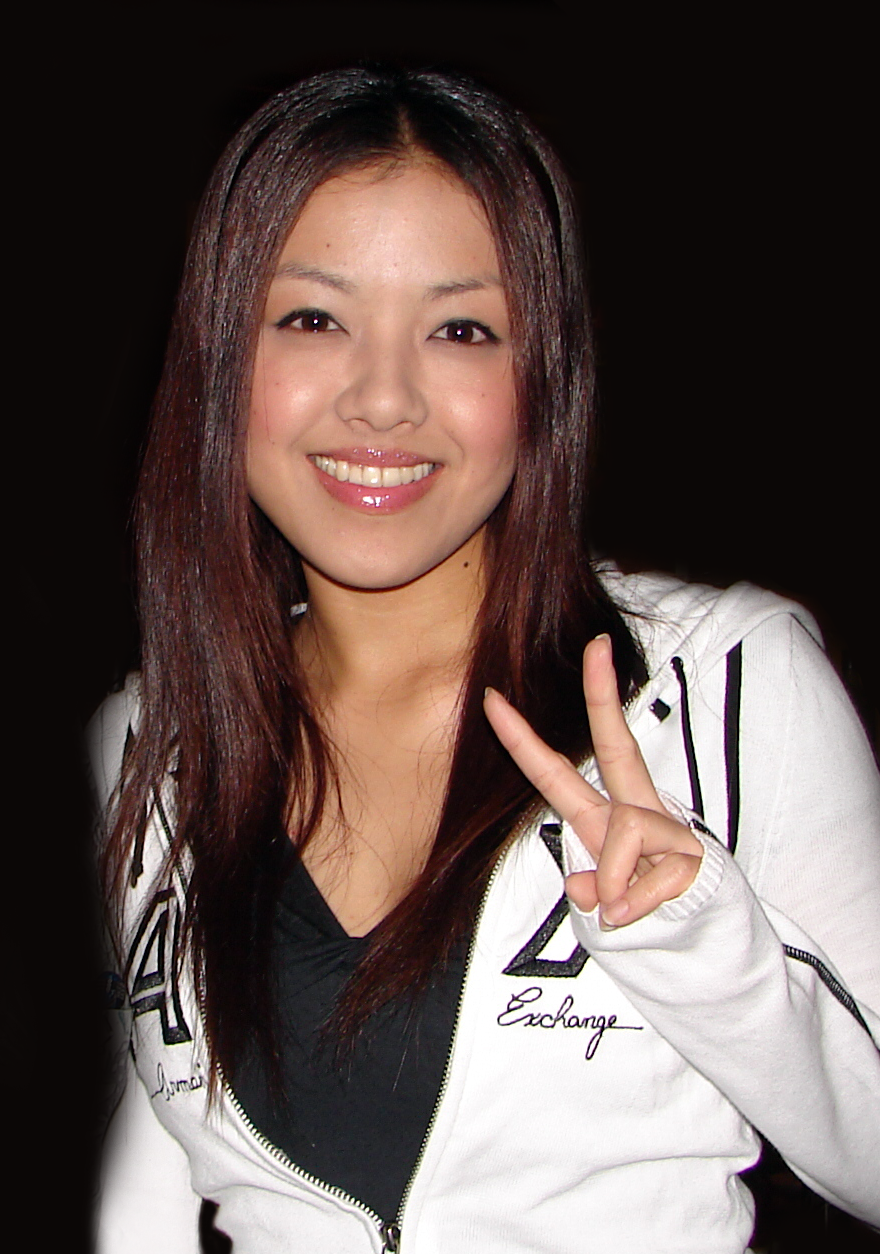
- Yuna Ito in 2006.
- Studio albums: 3
- Compilation albums: 1
- Singles: 19

The discography of Japanese-American musician Yuna Ito consists of three studio albums, one compilation album and nineteen singles. Her debut album, Heart, was released in 2007 after six singles, including one of the two theme songs for the film Nana, "Endless Story" (2005), which also featured Ito in her acting debut, as well as "Precious" (2006), the theme song of the film Limit of Love: Umizaru. Both of these songs were very commercially successful, becoming certified by the RIAJ.

In 2008, Ito released her second album Wish, followed by Dream in 2009. After releasing a further two singles, Ito released her final album, Love: Singles Best 2005–2010, an album compiling her singles released between 2006 and 2010.

== Studio albums ==
List of albums, with selected chart positions
Title	Album details	Peak positions		Sales (JPN) (Note: Sales provided by Oricon database and are rounded to the nearest thousand copies.)	Certifications
Title	Album details	JPN	TWN East Asian (Note: The G-Music chart was established in July 2005 and only archives the top 20 releases. The East Asian chart is a sub-chart, so releases may not have charted on the main top 20.) (Note: Positions were taken from 2007 week 4 for Heart, 2008 week 6 for Wish, 2009 week 23 for Dream and 2010 week 50 for Love: Singles Best 2005–2010.)	Sales (JPN)	Certifications
Heart	Released: January 24, 2007 (JPN); Label: Studioseven Recordings; Formats: CD, CD/DVD, digital download	1	2	530,000	RIAJ: 2× Platinum
Wish	Released: February 20, 2008 (JPN); Label: Studioseven; Formats: CD, CD/DVD, digital download	3	6	103,000	RIAJ: Gold
Dream	Released: May 27, 2009 (JPN); Label: Studioseven; Formats: CD, CD/DVD, digital download	7	10	36,000	
"—" denotes items which did not chart, were not released in the listed regions, or released before the creation of the Gaon Albums Chart.

== Compilation albums ==
List of albums, with selected chart positions
Title	Album details	Peak positions		Sales (JPN)
Title	Album details	JPN	TWN East Asian	Sales (JPN)
Love: Singles Best 2005–2010	Released: December 8, 2010 (JPN); Label: Studioseven; Formats: CD, 2CD, CD/DVD, digital download	8	20	50,000

== Singles ==
=== As a lead artist ===
List of singles, with selected chart positions, sales and certifications
Title	Year	Peak chart positions		Sales (JPN)	Certifications	Album
Title	Year	Oricon Singles Charts	Billboard Japan Hot 100 (Note: The Japan Hot 100 was established in February 2008.) (Note: Sources for chart positions are as follows: "Anata ga Iru Kagiri", "Alone Again", "Miss You", "Koi wa Groovy x2", "Ima Demo Zutto", "Trust You", "Ima demo Aitai yo...", "Let It Go", "Yasuragi o Motomete", "Mamotte Agetai".)	Sales (JPN)	Certifications	Album
"Endless Story" (as Reira starring Yuna Ito)	2005	2	—	472,000	RIAJ (ringtone): Million; RIAJ (digital): 3× Platinum; RIAJ (physical): 2× Platinum	Heart
"Faith"	2006	6	—	56,000	RIAJ (cellphone): Gold; RIAJ (physical): Gold	Heart
"Pureyes"	2006	6	—	56,000		Non-album single
"Precious"	2006	3	—	218,000	RIAJ (ringtone): Million; RIAJ (digital): 3× Platinum; RIAJ (physical): Platinum; RIAJ (streaming): Gold	Heart
"Stuck on You"	2006	20	—	16,000		Non-album single
"Losin'"	2006	19	—	10,000		Heart
"Truth" (as Reira starring Yuna Ito)	2006	10	—	47,000	RIAJ (physical): Gold	Heart
"I'm Here"	2007	15	—	37,000	RIAJ (cellphone): Gold	Wish
"Mahaloha" (with Micro of Def Tech)	2007	5	—	43,000	RIAJ (cellphone): Gold	Wish
"Urban Mermaid"	2007	10	—	24,000		Wish
"Anata ga Iru Kagiri (A World to Believe In)" (あなたがいる限り; "As Long as You are with Me")	2008	8	3	24,000		Wish
"Miss You"	2008	20	28	9,000		Dream
"Koi wa Groovy x2" (恋はgroovy×2; "Love Is Groovy Groovy")	2008	44	27	5,000		Dream
"Trust You"	2009	5	20	46,000	RIAJ (cellphone): Gold	Dream
"Ima demo Aitai yo" (今でも 会いたいよ…; "I Still Miss You Now...") (featuring Spontania)	2009	—	23			Dream
"Let It Go"	2009	36	71	4,000		Love
"Mamotte Agetai" (守ってあげたい; "I Want to Protect You")	2010	41	30	3,000		Love
"—" denotes items which were released before the creation of the Billboard Japan Hot 100 in 2008, or were ineligible to chart.

=== As a featured artist ===
List of singles, with selected chart positions, sales and certifications
Title	Year	Peak chart positions		Sales (JPN)	Certifications	Album
Title	Year	Oricon Singles Charts	Billboard Japan Hot 100 (Note: The Japan Hot 100 was established in February 2008.)	Sales (JPN)	Certifications	Album
"Ima Demo Zutto" (今でもずっと; "Still Even Now") (Spontania featuring Yuna Ito)	2009	22	6	8,000	RIAJ (cellphone): Gold	Collaborations Best
"Yasuragi o Motomete" (安らぎを求めて; "Seeking Tranquility") (Tatsuya Ishii featuring Yuna Ito)	2010	—	84			Moon & Earth
born to die (Micah Vaultz featuring Yuna Ito)	2017	—	—			Micah Vaultz
"—" denotes items which were ineligible to chart.

=== Promotional singles ===
Title	Year	Peak chart positions	Album
Title	Year	Billboard Japan Hot 100	Album
"Alone Again"	2008	87	Wish
"Love You"	2009	—	Dream
"I Don't Want to Miss a Thing"	2010	—	Love
"She"	2010	—	Love
"Hard to Say I'm Sorry"	2010	—	Love
"—" denotes items which did not chart.

== Other appearances ==
List of non-studio album or guest appearances that feature Yuna Ito
Title	Year	Album
"Endless Story (Soundtrack Version)"	2005	Original Soundtrack Nana
"Truth (Nana2 Original Soundtrack Version)"	2006	Original Soundtrack Nana2
"Heal" (Micro featuring Yuna Ito, Wise, PJ, Bigga Raiji and Primary Color Allstar)	2007	Laid Back
"My Heart Will Go On"	2007	Tribute to Celine Dion
"Gate" (Takeshi Kobayashi x Yuna Ito x Mikhail Pletnev)	2009	Original Soundtrack Gate: A True Story
