= Trust You =

Single by Yuna Ito

from the album Dream
- B-side: "Brand New World"
- Released: March 4, 2009
- Recorded: 2009
- Genre: Pop
- Label: Studioseven Recordings
- Songwriter: Markie

Yuna Ito singles chronology
"Ima Demo Zutto" (2009)	"Trust You" (2009)	"Let It Go" (2009)

Limited Edition

Trust You is the thirteenth Japanese-language single by American pop singer Yuna Ito. The title song, "Trust You" is the theme to Japanese anime Mobile Suit Gundam 00 season 2, while "Brand New World" was used as a tie-up song for the Commercial of Hawkins Sport.

In its first week, the single sold 27,254 copies, making it the third highest selling first week single sales by Ito as of March 2009, behind Endless Story and Precious. "Trust You" is Ito's first Top 5 single since the release of her previous single Mahaloha in June 2007. "Trust You" also gave Ito her highest first-week sales since 2006's Precious.

== Track list ==
No.	Title	Lyrics	Music	Length
1.	"Trust You"	Markie	Markie	5:19
2.	"Brand New World"	Shunsuke Minami	Shunsuke Minami	4:30
3.	"Koi wa Groovyx2: DJ-Passion More Passion Remix (恋はgroovy×2-dj-passion More Passion Remix-, lit. Love Is Groovy Groovy)"	Kenn Kato	Minami Shunsuke	3:42
4.	"Trust You: Gundam 00 Ver." (Limited Edition only)	Markie	Markie	1:33
5.	"Trust You (Instrumental)"	Markie	Markie	5:20

== TV Promotional Performances ==
1. 04/25 - Hong Kong Best Advertisement Award 2009 (with Endless Story)

== Chart ==
=== Oricon ===
Chart	Peak position	Sales total	Chart run
Oricon Daily Chart	4		9 weeks
Oricon Weekly Chart	5	27,254	9 weeks
Oricon Monthly Chart	20	41,866	9 weeks
Oricon Yearly Chart		45,682	9 weeks

=== Billboard ===
Billboard Japan	Peak position
Japan Hot 100	20
