= Dream (Yuna Ito album) =

Studio album by Yuna Ito
- Released: May 27, 2009
- Recorded: 2008–2009
- Genre: Pop
- Length: 52:21
- Label: Studioseven Recordings

Yuna Ito chronology
Wish (2008)	Dream (2009)	Love: Singles Best 2005—2010 (2010)

CD+DVD
- CD+DVD Limited Edition cover

Singles from Dream
- 1. "Miss You" Released: September 3, 2008; 2. "Koi wa Groovy x2" Released: November 26, 2008; 3. "Trust You" Released: March 4, 2009

Dream is American pop singer Yuna Ito's third Japanese studio album. The album was released on May 27, 2009, under her label Studioseven Recordings. The album was released in two formats: CD-only and a limited CD+DVD version that contains four music videos and the making of the video. The motto of the album is: "If you can dream it, you can do it".

== Overview ==
The release of Dream comes just over one year after Ito's second studio album, Wish. Dream includes the three singles that were released in order to promote the album. Also included in the album is the answer song to "Ima Demo Zutto", "Ima Demo Aitai yo..." (今でも会いたいよ．．．, I Still Miss You), featuring hip-hop duo Spontania which was also used to promote the album.

== Promotion ==
The first single "Miss You" was used as the background song for Ito En's Vitamin Fruit commercial in which Ito appeared. "Koi wa Groovy x2" was used to promote the Gap's 2008 Holiday Collection "Winter Neutrals" campaign. "Trust You" was used as the ending theme song for the second season of anime series Mobile Suit Gundam 00. "Brand New World", the B-side for "Trust You" was used as the background music for Hawkins Sports. Unlike the other three songs, Love Machine Gun was not released as a single but was used as the insert song for the cell phone novel Tenshi no Koi (天使の恋, Angel's Love).

== Track listing ==
CD
No.	Title	Lyrics	Length
1.	"Love You"	Ryosuke Imai, Nataumi Kobayashi	4:01
2.	"I Still Want to See You... (featuring Spontania)" (今でも 会いたいよ・・・; Ima Demo Aitai Yo...)	Yuna Ito, Spontania, Jeff Miyahara, Ryll	3:46
3.	"Brand New World"	Shunsuke Minami	4:28
4.	"Love Is Groovy×2" (恋はGroovy×2; Koi wa Groovy×2)	Kenn Kato	3:34
5.	"Trust You"	Markie	5:18
6.	"Baila Baila"	Kaoru Kami	3:25
7.	"Breeeeezin!!!!!!!"	Kaoru Kami	3:50
8.	"Miss You"	Maika Shiratori	5:03
9.	"Love Machine Gun"	Natsumi Kobayashi	4:45
10.	"No One Else"	Kenn Kato	3:59
11.	"Body"	Yuna Ito, Shoko Fujibayashi	10:05
12.	"Groovy ×2" (Hidden track)

DVD
No.	Title	Length
1.	"Miss You"
2.	"Love Is Groovy×2"
3.	"Trust You"
4.	"I Still Want to See You..."
5.	"Making Of"

== Singles ==
- Miss You: The first single released from Dream. "Miss You" debuted at #20 on the Oricon single chart.
- Koi wa Groovy x2: The second single from the album. It debuted at #44 on the charts.
- Trust You: The last single from the album was "Trust You". "Trust You" debuted at #5 on the charts.

== Charts and certifications ==
Chart (2009)	Peak position	Sales figures	Certification (thresholds)
Japan Oricon Daily	4		
Japan Oricon Weekly	7	35,738	
Japan Oricon Monthly	20		
