= Nana 2 =

- Theatrical release poster
- Directed by: Kentarō Ōtani
- Written by: Kentarō Ōtani
- Based on: Nana by Ai Yazawa
- Produced by: Osamu Kubota; Toshiaki Nakazawa
- Starring: Mika Nakashima; Yui Ichikawa; Hiroki Narimiya; Kanata Hongo; Yuna Ito
- Cinematography: Motonobu Kiyoku
- Music by: Tadashi Ueda
- Production companies: TBS; SEDIC International; Shueisha; MBS; True Project; Sony Music Entertainment Japan
- Distributed by: Toho
- Release date: December 9, 2006 (Japan)
- Running time: 130 minutes
- Country: Japan
- Language: Japanese

Nana 2 is a 2006 Japanese drama film directed by Kentarō Ōtani and adapted from the manga by Ai Yazawa. It is the sequel to the 2005 film Nana. Production for the movie began in mid-September 2006 and, after only one and a half month's worth of shooting, the film was finished in time for its December 9, 2006, theatrical release.

== Synopsis ==
Taking place shortly after the end of the first film, Nana 2 focuses more on Nana K. and her love life. Romance develops between Nana K. and Trapnest's bassist Takumi as well as with the Black Stones' guitarist Nobu. Meanwhile, Nana O. works hard for her band while trying to find happiness. Both girls struggle through life, and try to keep their friendship from falling apart.

== Cast ==
- Nana Osaki: Mika Nakashima
- Nobuo Terashima: Hiroki Narimiya
- Shinichi Okazaki: Kanata Hongo
- Yasushi Takagi: Tomomi Maruyama

- Nana Komatsu: Yui Ichikawa
- Reira Serizawa: Yuna Ito
- Ren Honjo: Nobuo Kyo
- Takumi Ichinose: Tetsuji Tamayama
- Naoki Fujieda: Momosuke Mizutani

- Kyosuke Takakura: Takehisa Takayama
- Junko Saotome: Anna Nose
- Shoji Endo: Yūta Hiraoka
- Mr. Kawano: Seiichi Tanabe
- Miss Sakagami: Rumi Shishido
- Sachiko Kawamura: Saeko

- Mizukoshi: Kazuma Suzuki
- Natsuko Komatsu: Yoshiko Miyazaki
- Yokoi: Tetsuhiro Ikeda
- Satô Kôichi: Mickey Koga
- Nami Komatsu: Natsuki Okamoto
- Nao Komatsu: Mieko Kon'ya

== Casting ==
Several actors who portrayed characters in the previous film did not return for Nana 2. Aoi Miyazaki declined to reprise the role of Nana Komatsu, and was replaced by actress Yui Ichikawa. Ryuhei Matsuda declined to play the role of Ren and was replaced with Nobuo Kyo. Kenichi Matsuyama, who portrayed Shinichi Okazaki, was replaced by Hongo Kanata.

== Theatrical release ==
Even though both theme songs were released ahead ("Hitoiro" of Nana starring Mika Nakashima on November 29, 2006, and "Truth" of Reira starring Una Ito on December 6, 2006), the movie could only hit the #4 spot on the Movie Charts, from its release December 9, 2006, onward, and overall had very weak and low ratings. Many fans claimed that the exchange of main cast members led to the disappointing statistics.

On December 18, Nana 2 made its international debut in New York City, United States. New York - Tokyo brought the main actresses Mika Nakashima and Yui Ichikawa to the limited seated IFC Center. The movie was well received by fans.

== Theme songs ==
Nana 2 once again featured the two artists Mika Nakashima and Yuna Ito, releasing songs under the names Nana starring Mika Nakashima and Reira starring Yuna Ito, respectively.

Nana, starring Mika Nakashima's new single "Hitoiro" featured Takuro of Glay as composer and Nana author Yazawa Ai as the lyricist again. It did not do as well as its predecessor "Glamorous Sky," peaking at only #5 on the Oricon charts. Two weeks after the release of the single, however, Nana starring Mika Nakashima released her first and last album, The End, which managed to rank at #2 on the Oricon charts.

Reira, starring Yuna Ito's "Truth" had no more luck than Nakashima's new single, ranking in only at the tenth place on the Oricon charts. The music video of the single was filmed in Scotland and used as scenes of the film. Neither of the singles were as record-setting as their predecessors.
