= I'm Here (Yuna Ito song) =

Single by Yuna Ito

from the album Wish
- Released: March 14, 2007
- Genre: J-pop, urban contemporary
- Length: 0:19:05
- Label: Studioseven Recordings, Sony Music Japan

Yuna Ito singles chronology
"Truth" (2006)	"I'm Here" (2007)	"Mahaloha" (2007)

"I'm Here" is Yuna Ito's seventh single in total, and first of the year 2007, released after her successful debut album "Heart", on March 14, 2007, under Studioseven Recordings.

== Track list ==
1. "I'm Here"
2. "Reason Why"
3. "Faith" (Teardance remix)
4. "I'm Here" (instrumental)

== Charts ==
The single overall did not reach a higher position at the Daily Single Rankings than #10. It eventually fell down and is pending between #13 and #15 since its release. A day after UNFAIR -the movie- was released, it was the only time for the single to be in the Top 10.
