= Mahaloha =

2007 single by Yuna Ito

Single by Yuna Ito

from the album Wish
- Released: June 27, 2007
- Genre: J-pop
- Length: ???
- Label: Studioseven Recordings, Sony Music Japan
- Songwriters: Yuna Ito, Micro, Ryohei Shimoyama
- Producer: Micro

Yuna Ito singles chronology
"I'm Here" (2007)	"Mahaloha" (2007)	"Urban Mermaid"

"Mahaloha" is Yuna Ito's first collaboration single, and her 8th in total. Micro from Def Tech provided guest vocals. The single was released on June 27, 2007 under Studioseven Recordings. The song was described as “very Hawaiian” by Ito, and should “let everyone outside of Hawaii feel the wind of the island”. Mahaloha charted at #5 on Oricon's Weekly Single Charts, making it Ito's first Top Five single since her 2006 hit "Precious".

== Track list ==
1. Mahaloha
2. Shining On
3. Stuck on You: Reggae Disco Rockers Kiss & Tell Remix
4. Mahaloha: Instrumental

== Music video ==
It features Ito on a bench and walking on the side of a beach while singing the song, as well as laughing and joking around with Micro, as well as sitting together in a garden watching the sun set. Micro is shown sitting on a back of the truck and handling a surfboard. Both joke and sing along.

== Charts ==
=== Oricon Sales Chart (Japan) ===
Release	Chart	Peak position	First sales	Sales total	Chart run
27 June 2007	Oricon Daily Singles Chart	4			
27 June 2007	Oricon Weekly Singles Chart	5	19,754	43,233	
27 June 2007	Oricon Monthly Singles Chart	19	39,161		
27 June 2007	Oricon Yearly Singles Chart	TBR			

== Performances ==
- June 11, 2007 - Hey!Hey!Hey! - with Micro
- June 22, 2007 - Music Station - with Micro
