= Complete Best (Celine Dion album) =

Greatest hits album by Celine Dion
- Released: 27 February 2008
- Recorded: 1990–2008
- Genre: Pop
- Length: 76:23
- Label: SMEJ
- Producers: Walter Afanasieff; Peer Åström; David Foster; R. Kelly; Kristian Lundin; Vito Luprano; Max Martin; Christopher Neil; Aldo Nova; John Shanks; Jim Steinman; Kenji Tamai; Ric Wake

Celine Dion chronology
Taking Chances (2007)	Complete Best (2008)	My Love: Essential Collection (2008)

Singles from Complete Best
- 1. "A World to Believe In" Released: 16 January 2008

Complete Best is the second English‑language greatest hits album by Canadian singer Celine Dion. It was released exclusively in Japan on 27 February 2008. The album reached number three on the Oricon Albums Chart, was certified gold by the RIAJ, and sold 173,100 copies in Japan in 2008.

== Background ==
Complete Best was released a few days before Dion's sold-out concerts in Japan, which were part of the Taking Chances World Tour. The compilation includes "To Love You More", originally released in October 1995, which became Dion's biggest hit in Japan, topping the singles chart for four weeks and selling 1.5 million copies. It also includes two other singles exclusive to Japan: "The Power of the Dream" and "Be the Man", as well as many of Dion's other hits.

The new single, "A World to Believe In" (U.S.A. mix), was included as the first track of the compilation. Recorded as an English-Japanese duet with Yuna Ito, the song was released in January 2008 and peaked at number eight on the Oricon Singles Chart. It was Dion's first appearance on the chart since "To Love You More" (dance mixes) entered it in April 1999. The duet was not included on Dion's previous album, Taking Chances, which contains the original English solo version of the song.

In October 2008, another greatest hits album was released internationally, titled My Love: Essential Collection. Because Complete Best had been released recently, this compilation was not issued in Japan. However, new unreleased tracks from My Love: Essential Collection were included on the CD single A World to Believe In: Himiko Fantasia, released in Japan at the same time. On 22 July 2009, the album was reissued in Blu-spec CD format in Japan.

== Commercial performance ==
Complete Best debuted at number three on the Oricon Albums Chart, selling 34,223 copies. In its second week, it fell to number six, selling 27,281 units. The following week, shortly after the Japanese leg of the Taking Chances World Tour, Complete Best rose to number four with sales of 34,724 copies. In the fourth week, the album dropped to number six and sold 16,304 units. It later went down to number 12 (11,040 copies) and 16 (7,956 copies). During these six consecutive weeks, Complete Best held the top position on the Oricon International Albums Chart. Shortly after its release, Complete Best was certified gold by the RIAJ. It sold 173,100 copies in Japan in 2008.

== Track listing ==
No.	Title	Writer(s)	Producer(s)	Length
1.	"あなたがいる限り 〜A World to Believe In〜" (with Yuna Ito) (U.S.A. mix)	Tino Izzo; Rosanna Ciciola; Natsumi Kobayashi^{[a]}	John Shanks; Kenji Tamai	4:11
2.	"My Heart Will Go On"	James Horner; Will Jennings	Walter Afanasieff; Horner^{[b]}	4:41
3.	"To Love You More" (radio edit)	David Foster; Junior Miles	Foster	4:49
4.	"The Power of Love" (radio edit)	Gunther Mende; Candy DeRouge; Jennifer Rush; Mary Susan Applegate	Foster	4:46
5.	"Beauty and the Beast" (with Peabo Bryson)	Alan Menken; Howard Ashman	Afanasieff	4:05
6.	"Because You Loved Me"	Diane Warren	Foster	4:35
7.	"It's All Coming Back to Me Now" (radio edit)	Jim Steinman	Steinman; Steven Rinkoff^{[b]}; Roy Bittan^{[b]}	5:32
8.	"Be the Man (On This Night)"	Foster; Miles	Foster	4:41
9.	"I'm Your Angel" (with R. Kelly)	Kelly	Kelly	5:31
10.	"Where Does My Heart Beat Now"	Robert White Johnson; Taylor Rhodes	Christopher Neil	4:35
11.	"The Power of the Dream"	Foster; Babyface; Linda Thompson	Foster; Babyface^{[b]}	4:32
12.	"When I Fall in Love" (with Clive Griffin)	Edward Heyman; Victor Young	Foster	4:23
13.	"That's the Way It Is"	Max Martin; Kristian Lundin; Andreas Carlsson	Martin; Lundin	4:04
14.	"A New Day Has Come" (radio remix)	Aldo Nova; Stephan Moccio	Ric Wake; Afanasieff; Nova; Richie Jones^{[c]}; S.A.F.^{[c]}	4:21
15.	"I'm Alive"	Lundin; Carlsson	Lundin; Wake^{[c]}; Jones^{[c]}	3:32
16.	"I Drove All Night"	Billy Steinberg; Tom Kelly	Peer Åström; Vito Luprano	4:02
17.	"Taking Chances"	Kara DioGuardi; Dave Stewart	Shanks	4:03
Total length:				76:23

== Notes ==
- ^{^a} signifies Japanese lyrics
- ^{^b} signifies a co-producer
- ^{^c} signifies an additional producer

== Charts ==
=== Weekly charts ===
Weekly chart performance
Chart (2008)	Peak position
Japanese Albums (Oricon)	3
Japanese International Albums (Oricon)	1
Japanese Top Albums (Billboard Japan)	3

=== Year-end charts ===
Year-end chart performance
Chart (2008)	Position
Japanese Albums (Oricon)	71
Japanese International Albums (Oricon)	2
Japanese Top Albums (Billboard Japan)	69

== Certifications and sales ==
Certifications
Region	Certification	Certified units/sales
Japan (RIAJ)	Gold	173,100

== Ultimate Box ==
On 27 February 2008, Sony Music Entertainment Japan released Ultimate Box as a limited edition. The five‑disc box set includes two CD albums (Taking Chances and Complete Best) and three DVDs: Live in Las Vegas: A New Day..., All the Way... A Decade of Song & Video (expanded with six additional music videos), and Taking Chances Recording Sessions, which contains 12 songs. Ultimate Box peaked at number 109 on the Oricon Albums Chart in Japan in March 2008, and at number 27 on the International Oricon Albums Chart.

== Release history ==
Release history
Region	Date	Label	Format	Catalog
Japan	27 February 2008	SMEJ	CD	EICP-953
Japan	22 July 2009	SMEJ	Blu-spec CD	EICP-20055
