= Mamotte Agetai =

The Japanese phrase Mamotte Agetai (Japanese: 守ってあげたい, "I Want to Protect You") may refer to:

- "Mamotte Agetai" (Yuna Ito song), a 2010 song by Yuna Ito
- "Mamotte Agetai" (Yumi Matsutoya song), a 1981 song by Yumi Matsutoya
- Mamotte Agetai, a 1998 manga by Naoki Yamamoto
- Mamotte Agetai!, a manga and 2000 film by Ikuko Kujirai
- "Mamotte Agetai", a 2013 song by Juju
- "Mamotte Agetai", a 2013 song by Yuzu
