= Wish (Yuna Ito album) =

Studio album by Yuna Ito
- Released: 20 February 2008 (Japan)
- Genre: J-Pop
- Length: 1:07:06
- Labels: Studioseven Recordings, Sony Music Japan
- Producers: Kenji Tamai, John Shanks, Micro

Yuna Ito chronology
| Heart (2007) | Wish (2008) | Dream (2009) |

CD + DVD
- CD + DVD cover

Singles from Wish
- 1. "I'm Here" Released: 14 March 2007; 2. "Mahaloha" Released: 27 June 2007; 3. "Urban Mermaid" Released: 24 October 2007; 4. "A World to Believe In" Released: 16 January 2008

Wish is the second studio album by Japanese-pop singer Yuna Ito. The album was released on 20 February 2008 on Studioseven Recordings, Sony Music Japan. Wish was released in two versions, CD-only and CD-DVD version. In its first week 49,000 copies were sold. Wish has been certified gold by RIAJ for shipment of 100,000 copies in Japan.

== Track listing ==
1. Power of Love
2. Alone Again
3. "あなたがいる限り: A World to Believe In" (Anata ga Iru Kagiri: A World to Believe In)
4. "Urban Mermaid"
5. "Heartbeat"
6. "Colorful"
7. "Unite As One"
8. "Mahaloha"
9. "A Long Walk"
10. "Moon Rabbit"
11. "I'm Here"
12. "Wish"
13. "Tokyo Days"
14. "My Heart Will Go On" (Bonus)

DVD

1. I'm Here PV
2. Mahaloha PV
3. Urban Mermaid PV
4. "あなたがいる限り: A World to Believe In" (Anata ga Iru Kagiri: A World to Believe In PV)

== Tie-ins ==
1. "I'm Here" was used as the theme song for アンフェア: the movie (Unfair: The Movie).
2. "Urban Mermaid" was used in Japan's Lux shampoo commercial.
3. "あなたがいる限り: A World to Believe In" (Anata ga Iru Kagiri: A World to Believe In) was used in au LISMO commercial.
4. "Tokyo Days" was used in Japan's Proactiv Solution commercial, which featured Yuna Ito.
5. "Colorful" was used as the theme song for Fuji Television's Mezamashi Doyoubi.
6. "Unite As One" was used as the ending theme song for Konami's Nintendo DS game Time Hollow: 奪われた過去を求めて (Time Hollow: Ubawareta Kako wo Motomete).

== Chart performance ==
=== Oricon sales chart (Japan) ===
| Release | Chart | Peak position | Sales total | Chart run |
|---|---|---|---|---|
| February 20, 2008 | Oricon Daily Albums Chart | 3 | | |
| February 20, 2008 | Oricon Weekly Albums Chart | 3 | 49,095 | 15+ weeks |
| February 20, 2008 | Oricon Monthly Albums Chart | 10 | | |
| February 20, 2008 | Oricon Yearly Albums Chart | 96 | 103,405 | |

=== Billboard (Japan) ===
| Release | Chart | Peak position | Chart run |
|---|---|---|---|
| February 20, 2008 | Billboard Japan Hot 100 | 4 | 2 weeks |

== Singles ==
| Date | Title | Peak position | Sales total | Weeks |
|---|---|---|---|---|
| 14 March 2007 | "I'm Here" | 15 | 36,634 | 41 weeks |
| 27 June 2007 | "Mahaloha" | 5 | 43,233 | 37 weeks |
| 24 October 2007 | "Urban Mermaid" | 10 | 23,833 | 42 weeks |
| 16 January 2008 | "A World to Believe In (あなたがいる限り: A World to Believe In") (Anata ga Iru Kagiri: A World to Believe In) | 8 | 24,105 | 29 weeks |
