= Mamotte Agetai (Yuna Ito song) =

Single by Yuna Ito

from the album Love: Single's Best 2005—2010
- B-side: "Kiss Me"
- Released: November 3, 2010
- Recorded: 2010
- Genre: Pop
- Label: Studioseven Recordings
- Songwriters: H.U.B., Shinichiro Murayama

Yuna Ito singles chronology
"Let It Go" (2009)	"Mamotte Agetai" (2010)

"Mamotte Agetai" (守ってあげたい; "I Want to Protect You") is a song recorded by American recording artist Yuna Ito. The song will serve as her fifteenth Japanese-language single released by Studioseven Recordings. "Mamotte Agetai" has been described as a "ballad track which promises to be the hit of winter 2010". The leading track is the theme song for the Japanese drama Ōgon no Buta (黄金の豚) which premiered on October 20, 2010.

== Track listing ==
No.	Title	Lyrics	Music	Arranger(s)	Length
1.	"Mamotte Agetai" (守ってあげたい "I Want to Protect You")	H.U.B.	Shinichiro Murayama	Shinichiro Murayama	5:19
2.	"Kiss Me"	Kenn Kato	Hiroo Yamaguchi	Jun Suyama, Hiroo Yamaguchi	4:06
3.	"Precious" (Q;indivi Celebration Remix)	Kei Noguchi	Hayato Tanaka	Yusuke Tanaka, Takashi Kondo	7:14
4.	"Mamotte Agetai" (Instrumental)	H.U.B.	Shinichiro Murayama	Shinichiro Murayama	5:18

- Source: Joshin

== Charts ==
"Mamotte Agetai" - Oricon Sales Chart (Japan)

Release	Chart	Peak position	Sales total	Chart run
November 3, 2010	Oricon Daily Singles Chart	-		
November 3, 2010	Oricon Weekly Singles Chart	41	2,722	2
November 3, 2010	Oricon Monthly Singles Chart	-		
November 3, 2010	Oricon Yearly Singles Chart	-		
