= Koi wa Groovy x2 =

Single by Yuna Ito

from the album Dream
- B-side: "Mafuyu no Seiza"
- Released: November 26, 2008
- Recorded: 2008
- Label: Studioseven Recordings
- Songwriter: Kenn Kato

Yuna Ito singles chronology
"Miss You" (2008)	"Koi wa Groovy x2" (2008)	"Ima Demo Zutto" (2009)

Koi wa Groovy×2 (恋はgroovy×2, lit. Love is Groovy Groovy) is the twelfth single by Yuna Ito. The single was released on November 26, 2008, two months after her previous single Miss You. To date, this is the lowest charting single of Ito's career.

== Overview ==
On October 3, 2008, Ito left a message on her blog to say that she had recorded a new song with an up-beat tempo. On several fan sites and forums, it was rumored that the single was entitled "Good Beat Good Beat".

Originally the first verse of the song started with "Hey boy", but it was later changed to "Hey girl." Explaining the change, Ito said:

When I was recording the lyrics (to "Koi wa Groovy²"), they were actually "Hey boy," but when I was recording I was thinking, wait, I'm not out to go to clubs to get laid! The point is to go out with your girlfriends and have a great time, and if you find someone, then (you hit) two birds with one stone. So (I changed the lyrics to) "Hey girl."

"Koi wa Groovy x2" was used to promote Gap Japan's 2008 Holiday Collection Winter Neutrals which featured Canadian Supermodel Groovy M.

== Music video ==
On October 10, Ito posted a message on her blog about the music video for the promotion of the single. She stated the music video's theme was inspired by Canadian model Groovy M, and the idea of a fashion show. The music video was shot in New York City. The music video was released on MTV on November 4, 2008.

== English Version ==
An all English version of the song entitled "groovy×2" was released December 10, 2008, under an alter-ego named Christine Ito, her "sister". The song is only available for download.

== Track list ==
No.	Title	Writer(s)	Length
1.	"Koi wa groovy×2"	Kenn Kato	3:37
2.	"Mafuyu no Seiza (真冬の星座, lit. Midwinter Constellation)"	Markie	4:44
3.	"Miss You: Hawaiian Breeze Remix"	Maika Hakuchō	7:56
4.	"Koi wa groovy×2 (Instrumental)"	Kenn Kato	3:35

== Charts ==
=== Oricon ===
Release	Chart	Peak position	First week sales	Sales total	Chart run
November 26, 2008	Oricon Daily Singles Chart	28			
November 26, 2008	Oricon Weekly Singles Chart	44	2,912	5,080	2 weeks+
November 26, 2008	Oricon Monthly Singles Chart				
November 26, 2008	Oricon Yearly Singles Chart				

=== Billboard Japan Chart ===
Release	Chart	Peak position
November 26, 2008	Billboard Japan Hot 100	
November 26, 2008	Billboard Japan Hot 100 Airplay	
November 26, 2008	Billboard Japan Hot Singles Sales	
