= 6250 Saekohayashi =

Main-belt asteroid

Discovery
- Discovered by: E. F. Helin
- Discovery site: Palomar Obs.
- Discovery date: 2 November 1991

Designations
- Named after: Saeko Hayashi (Japanese astronomer)
- Alternative designations: 1991 VX_{1} · 1983 VP_{5}
- Minor planet category: main-belt · (inner); Hungaria

Orbital characteristics
- Epoch 4 September 2017 (JD 2458000.5)
- Uncertainty parameter 0
- Observation arc: 33.56 yr (12,259 days)
- Aphelion: 2.0701 AU
- Perihelion: 1.7950 AU
- Semi-major axis: 1.9326 AU
- Eccentricity: 0.0712
- Orbital period (sidereal): 2.69 yr (981 days)
- Mean anomaly: 96.960°
- Mean motion: 0° 22^{m} 0.84^{s} / day
- Inclination: 19.788°
- Longitude of ascending node: 226.56°
- Argument of perihelion: 299.08°

Physical characteristics
- Dimensions: 3.67 km (calculated)
- Synodic rotation period: 82.6±0.5 h
- Geometric albedo: 0.30 (assumed)
- Spectral type: E
- Absolute magnitude (H): 14.1 · 14.17±0.26

6250 Saekohayashi, provisional designation 1991 VX_{1}, is a bright Hungaria asteroid and relatively slow rotator from the inner regions of the asteroid belt, approximately 3.7 kilometers in diameter. It was discovered on 2 November 1991, by American astronomer Eleanor Helin at Palomar Observatory in California, and later named after Japanese astronomer Saeko Hayashi.

== Orbit and classification ==
Saekohayashi is a member of the Hungaria family, which form the innermost dense concentration of asteroids in the Solar System. It orbits the Sun at a distance of 1.8–2.1 AU once every 2 years and 8 months (981 days). Its orbit has an eccentricity of 0.07 and an inclination of 20° with respect to the ecliptic.

In November 1983, it was first identified as 1983 VP_{5} at the Karl Schwarzschild Observatory, extending the body's observation arc by 8 years prior to its official discovery observation at Palomar.

== Physical characteristics ==
=== Slow rotation and shape ===
In 2009, a rotational lightcurve of Saekohayashi was obtained by American astronomer Brian Warner at his Palmer Divide Observatory, Colorado. It gave a long rotation period of 82.6±0.5 hours with a high brightness variation of 0.78 magnitude (U=2+). A high brightness amplitude typically indicates that the body has a non-spheroidal shape. While not being a slow rotator, it has a notably longer than average period.

=== Diameter and albedo ===
The Collaborative Asteroid Lightcurve Link assumes a high albedo of 0.30, typical for E-type asteroids, and calculates a diameter of 3.7 kilometers with an absolute magnitude of 14.1.

== Naming ==
This minor planet was named after Japanese astronomer Saeko Hayashi (born 1958), associate professor at the National Astronomical Observatory of Japan, who works with the Subaru Telescope. Her research includes the formation processes of planetary systems. Saeko is also dedicated to the popularization of astronomy in Hawaii and Japan and is an active member of the International Astronomical Union. The official naming citation was published by the Minor Planet Center 15 February 1995 (M.P.C. 24730).
