= Kaori Natori =

Kaori Natori (名取香り)
- Origin: Tokyo
- Genres: J-pop
- Years active: 2005–present
- Label: Chimera Energy/Universal Music
- Website: Stardust Music profile Kaori Natori@Universal Web

Kaori Natori (名取香り, Natori Kaori; born September 3, 1982) is a Japanese singer under management of Stardust Music. She is signed to Chimera Energy, a label handled by Universal Music Japan.

In 2010, Natori became the permanent vocalist for the hip-hop/reggae band Spontania. As a member of the band, she is referred to as "Kaori" (in romaji).

== Discography ==
=== Album ===
1. "Perfume", 24 May 2006

=== Singles ===
1. "Gentleman", 26 January 2005, #140
2. "Player", 18 May 2005, #143
3. "Darling", 14 September 2005, #196
4. "Goodbye" (featuring Nao'ymt), 1 February 2006
5. "Lovespace", 19 April 2006
6. "Stay", 30 August 2006
7. "This Time", 6 December 2006
8. "シャワーを浴びる前に" Shower wo Abiru Mae ni, 22 August 2007
9. "すべてがある場所" Subete ga aru basho, 2 December 2007
