= Yuna Ito =

American-born singer and actress (born 1983)

Yuna Ito 伊藤 由奈
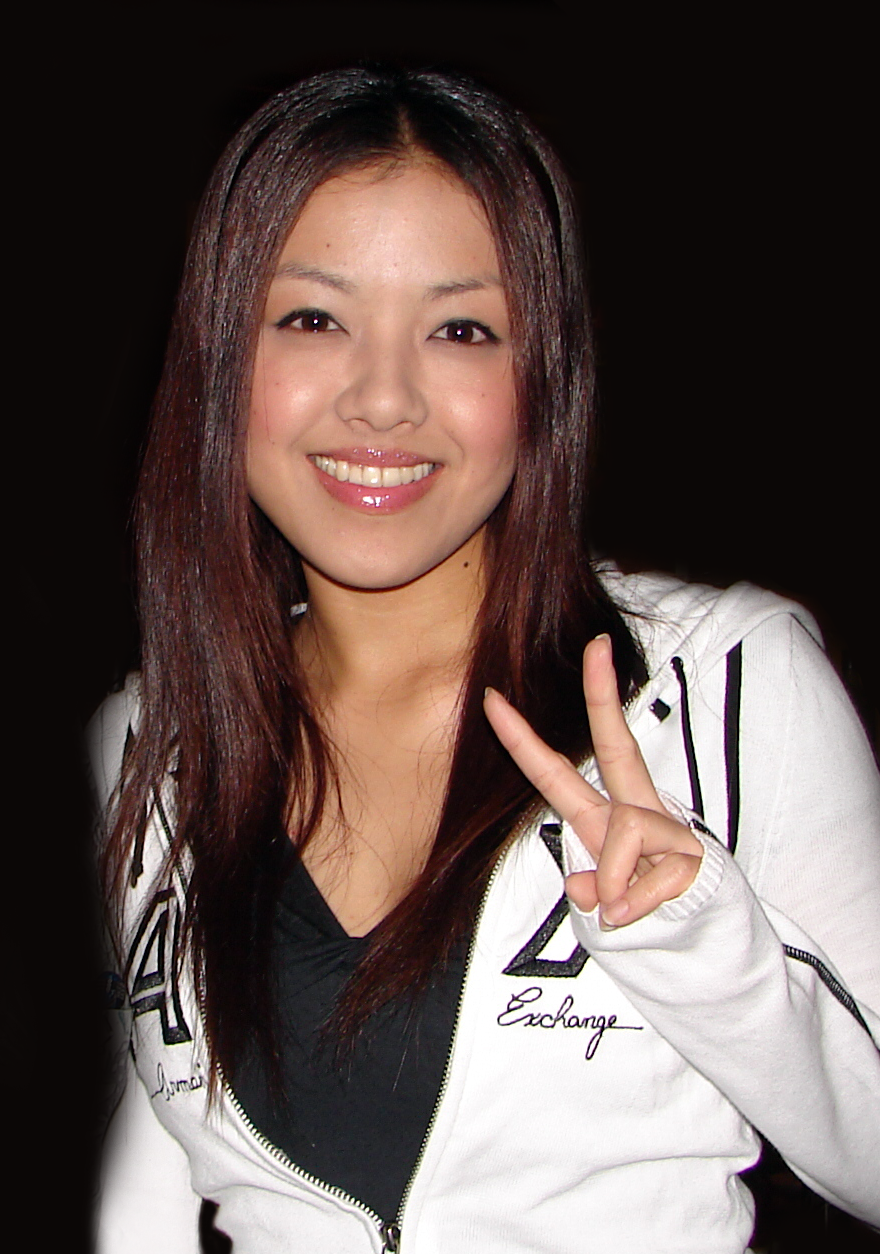
- Ito in 2006

Background information
- Also known as: Christine Itō (伊東 クリスティーン)
- Born: September 20, 1983 (age 42); Los Angeles, California, U.S.
- Origin: Oahu, Hawaii, U.S.
- Genres: Pop
- Occupations: Singer, actress
- Years active: 2005–2012, 2019
- Label: Studioseven Recordings
- Website: yunaweb.com

Yuna Ito (伊藤 由奈, Itō Yuna; born September 20, 1983) is an American-born former pop singer and actress who was active in Japan.

Ito made her musical debut in Japan with the single, "Endless Story", which was used as one of the theme songs for the popular 2005 film Nana; she also starred in the film, portraying Reira Serizawa. In 2006, Ito reprised her role as Reira for the sequel of the film singing the theme song, "Truth". In 2007, Ito released her debut album, Heart, which debuted atop the Oricon chart.

== Early life and education ==
Ito was born in Los Angeles, California to a South Korean mother and a Japanese father. She was raised in Oahu, Hawaii. From a young age, Ito dreamed about becoming a singer. She was inspired by the powerful vocals of Celine Dion. At the age of fifteen, she was offered a recording contract, but turned it down. She later explained: "They saw me as a girl and not a singer."

Initially, when Ito told her parents of plans to become a singer they disapproved of her choice. Her parents wanted Ito to attend school and meet a "nice guy". Ito disagreed with her parents, saying they wanted to "compact her life into a storybook". Ito graduated from McKinley High School in 2001. She moved to Japan in 2003.

She has a daughter, Ellie, who was born in February 2023.

== Career ==
=== 2005–2007: Debut ===
In 2005, Ito was chosen to portray Reira Serizawa, the vocalist for rock band Trapnest in the film adaptation of Ai Yazawa's popular manga series Nana. She released her debut single, "Endless Story", under the name "Reira Starring Yuna Ito"; the song was used as one of the theme songs for the film. "Endless Story" debuted on the Oricon chart at the #2 position, and is a cover of the English ballad, "If I'm Not In Love" by Constant Change, formerly Dawn Thomas. Following the release of "Endless Story" was her second single, "Faith/Pureyes" (2006), which debuted at #6 on the charts.

Ito released her third single, "Precious", which debuted at #3 on the charts. The single contained two b-sides, "I'm Free" and "Secret"; the latter was co-written by Ito and was the first time she contributed to one of her singles. Ito released three more singles in 2006; "Stuck on You", "Losin'", and "Truth". The singles debuted at the respective numbers of #20, #19 and #10. "Truth", released under the name "Reira Starring Yuna Ito", was used as a theme song for Nana 2 in which Ito again portrayed Reira Serizawa.

Ito started off 2007 with the release of her debut album Heart. Upon its release Heart topped the Oricon album chart. Heart was certified Double Platinum by the Recording Industry Association of Japan. In March, Ito released her seventh single, "I'm Here", which debuted at #15 on the Oricon chart.

The single following "I'm Here" was "Mahaloha" (June), which was a collaboration with Micro from the band Def Tech. The single debuted at #5 on the chart. Along with Micro, Ito wrote the lyrics and composed the song. At the end of the year, Ito released her ninth single, "Urban Mermaid", which debuted at #10 on the charts.

=== 2008–2012: Rise to prominence ===
Her tenth single, entitled "Anata ga Iru Kagiri: A World to Believe In", was released in on January 16, 2008. The song is a duet with Celine Dion. When Dion heard Ito's rendition of her song, she proposed the idea of a duet. Dion originally released this song on her latest English album Taking Chances. The song was used in an au LISMO commercial. "A World to Believe In" was nominated for "Best Collaboration Video", for the MTV Video Awards Japan '08, but lost to Kumi Koda's Last Angel.

The singer's second album Wish was released on February 20 and debuted at number three on the charts. Since the release of Wish, the album has been certified gold by the RIAJ. Unite As One, a song on her album, was used as the ending theme song for Konami's Time Hollow. In March, Ito became spokesperson for Proactiv Japan. Ito was featured in the commercial along with her song, "Tokyo Days", as the theme.

In June 2008, Ito collaborated with popular Japanese music producer Takeshi Kobayashi (who produced music for Mr. Children, a famous Japanese band) and Russian conductor Mikhail Pletnev, to sing "Gate", the theme song for the documentary movie with the same name, Gate.

Her eleventh single entitled "Miss You" was released on September 3, 2008 and was used as the theme song for Ito En Vitamin Fruit. "Miss You" inspired the cellphone novel Tenshi no Koi (天使の恋; lit. "Angel's Love"), which was written by sin. "Love Machine Gun" was also used as the main theme song for the novel. Ito was featured in the 6/4 edition of the magazine, Oricon Style, as the fifth-most suited for bridal wear. She was also featured in the 6/11 edition as sixth for most princess-like.

Her next single titled "Koi wa Groovy x2" (恋はgroovy×2; lit. "Love Is Groovy Groovy") was used as the Gap Japan's 2008 Holiday Collection Winter Neutrals campaign song. In addition to her song being used, Ito was also chosen to be a Gap model in July. Ito released an English version of "Koi wa Groovy x2", entitled "groovy x2" under the pseudonym Christine Ito (伊藤 クリスティーン). Sony Music Japan created an official website for Christine and a blog.

Ito collaborated with hip-pop/reggae duo Spontania for their single "Ima Demo Zutto" (今でもずっと; lit. "Now and Forever"), which was released on January 28, 2009. Ito's thirteenth single "Trust You", became the fourth ending theme song for the anime Mobile Suit Gundam 00 Second Season. The single was released on March 4, 2009 and became Ito's first Top 5 single since "Mahaloha" in 2007.

On March 31, 2009 "Ima Demo Aitai Yo..." feat. Spontania (今でも会いたいよ...; lit. "I Still Miss You"), which was the answer song to Spontania's "Ima Demo Zutto", was released online through ringtone sites. Ito's third album titled Dream was released on May 27, 2009. A single, "Let It Go", was released on November 11, 2009.

In June 2010, Yuna opened a special project named "洋楽カバーをやってほしい" (lit. "I Want You to Do a Western Cover"). The idea was that she would do a live cover on her radio show Heart to Heart. However, there were so many requests that her official website took the project and turned it into Ito Yuna Respects. After that 10 songs were selected (that were requested the most) and people could vote on one of these songs. The song that won the poll was Aerosmith's "I Don't Want to Miss a Thing". After recording and releasing the song on July 28, the project announced a second poll. The song that got selected was Elvis Costello's "She". The song was released on August 25. A third song was Chicago's "Hard to Say I'm Sorry".

On 9 September, the website Spanspo mentioned that the drama named Ougon no Buta would feature a theme song sung by Yuna. Two weeks later Sony's Music Shop confirmed the theme song would be released as a new single named "Mamotte Agetai". The single was released on 3 November 2010.

Ito then released her first compilation album Love: Single's Best 2005—2010 on December 8. It marked Ito's final release under her record company as of 2012.

=== 2019–present ===
Yuna Ito appeared at the 40th anniversary event [GUNDAM 40th FES. "LIVE-BEYOND" 2019 http://gundam40th.net/live_beyond/] of the "Mobile Suit Gundam" series TV anime broadcast. The event was held at the Makuhari Messe Event Hall for two days, September 7 and 8 2019.

Yuna Ito was in charge of the ending theme for the TV anime Mobile Suit Gundam 00. It was her first live performance in seven years in Japan. Both Gundam 00 and the cover of the Gundam song was shown.

== Discography ==
- Heart (2007)
- Wish (2008)
- Dream (2009)

== Filmography ==
Year	Film	Role
2005	Nana	Reira Serizawa
2006	Nana 2	Reira Serizawa
2010	Celine: Through the Eyes of the World	Herself (Guest Performer)

== Awards ==
- Best New Artist (Best Hit Kayōsai 2005, 11.21.2005)
- Best New Artist (Japan Cable Awards 2005, 12.17.2005)
- Special Award for Nana (47th Japan Record Awards, 12.31.2005)
- Best New Artist (Japan Gold Disc Awards 2006, 9.3.2006)
- Gold Artist Award (Best Hit Kayōsai 2006, 11.20.2006)
- Audience Request Award (39th Yūsen Taishō, 12.16.2006)
- Best Asia from Japan (MTV Video Music Awards Japan, 05.25.2007)

== Radio programs ==
From October 4, 2005 until March 28, 2006, Ito was moderator of her own radio show, Journey, which aired on Tokyo's InterFM radio station. Ito later returned with a new radio show, Heart to Heart.

On February 27, 2008, Ito did a public live talk show with Hilary Duff on Tokyo FM's radio show entitled Wonderful World. Although she appeared on the radio show, Hilary Duff's main purpose was to promote Disney Mobile, which she did also on the show.
