= Saeko (given name) =

- Gender: Female

Origin
- Origin: Japanese
- Meaning: Different meanings depending on the kanji used

Saeko is a feminine Japanese given name.

== Written forms ==
- サエコ in katakana
- さえこ in hiragana
- 紗子, "gauze, child"
- 小枝子, "little, bough, child"
- 紗江子, "gauze, creek, child"
- 冴子, "be clear, child"
- 佐江子, "assistant, creek, child"
- 佐恵子, "assistant, favor, child"
- 佐枝子, "assistant, bough, child"

== People with the name ==
- Saeko (actress) (紗栄子; born 1986), Japanese actress and model
- Saeko Chiba (千葉 紗子; born 1977), Japanese singer and voice actress
- Saeko Hayashi (林 左絵子, born 1958), Japanese astronomer
- Saeko Himuro (氷室 冴子; 1957–2008), Japanese novelist, essayist, and playwright
- Saeko Hirota (広田 佐枝子; born 1946), Japanese table tennis player
- Saeko Kimura (木村 さえこ; born 1963), Japanese synchronized swimmer
- Saeko Okayama (岡山 沙英子; born 1982), Japanese long jumper
- Saeko Shimazu (島津 冴子; born 1959), Japanese voice actress
- Saeko Ura (浦 彩恵子; born 1989), Japanese singer
- Saeko Zōgō (藏合 紗恵子; born 1984), Japanese actress

== Fictional characters ==
- Saeko, a character in Pale Flower
- Saeko, the titular antagonist of Saeko: Giantess Dating Sim
- Saeko Kageyama, a character in Kamen Rider 555
- Saeko Kanagusuku, a character in Godzilla vs. Mechagodzilla
- Saeko Matsumiya, a character in Son of Godzilla
- Saeko Mizuno, a character in Toire no Hanako-san
- Saeko Mukoda, a character in the Yakuza video game series
- Saeko Nogami, a character in City Hunter
- Saeko Sawatari, a character in How Do We Relationship?
- Saeko Shirasu, a character in Flag
- Saeko Sonozaki, a character in Kamen Rider W
- Saeko Sugawara, a character in Beyond Goodbye
- Saeko Yukihira, a character in Overtake!
