= Urban Mermaid =

Single by Yuna Ito

from the album Wish
- A-side: "Urban Mermaid"
- B-side: "Colorful"
- Released: October 24, 2007
- Genre: J-Pop
- Length: 0:18:30
- Label: Studioseven Recordings, Sony Music Japan

Yuna Ito singles chronology
"Mahaloha" (2007)	"Urban Mermaid" (2007)	"A World to Believe In" (2008)

"Urban Mermaid" is the 9th single of Japanese artist Yuna Ito released on October 24, 2007 under Studioseven Recordings.

== Track list ==
CD

1. Urban Mermaid
  CM: LUX (Shampoo)
2. Colorful
  Theme Song: Fuji TV Network
3. Mahaloha: Gira Mundo"City Lights at Night"Remix
4. Urban Mermaid: Instrumental

DVD

- Three performances from Yuna Ito 1st Live Tour: Heart
1. I'm Here
2. Workaholic
3. Precious: Encore

== Charts ==
=== Oricon Sales Chart (Japan) ===
Release	Chart	Peak position	First sales	Sales total	Chart run
October 24, 2007	Oricon Daily Singles Chart	8			
October 24, 2007	Oricon Weekly Singles Chart	10	12,045	19,983	3+
October 24, 2007	Oricon Monthly Singles Chart	TBR	TBR		
October 24, 2007	Oricon Yearly Singles Chart	TBR			
