= Truth (Yuna Ito song) =

Single by Yuna Ito

from the album Heart
- Released: December 6, 2006
- Genre: Pop rock
- Length: 0:22:09
- Label: Sony Music of Japan

Yuna Ito singles chronology
"Losin'" (2006)	"Truth" (2006)	"I'm Here" (2007)

"Truth" is Yuna Ito's 6th single and last of 2006. This is her second single to be a part of the Nana franchise, the first being "Endless Story".

== Overview ==
Truth was a sweeping ballad, making it her first ballad since Precious which was released on May 3, 2006. This single will be the ending theme to the movie Nana II, a movie which stars Mika Nakashima and Yuna Ito.

The PV for "Truth" was filmed in Scotland at Eileen Donan Castle as well as the performance to the b-side song Take Me Away that was used in the movie.

== Track listing ==
1. Truth
2. Take Me Away
3. Endless Story: Little Big Bee Lovespell Remix
4. Truth: Instrumental

== Live performances ==
- November 26, 2006 - MelodiX! - "Truth"
- December 8, 2006 - Music Station - "Truth"
- December 9, 2006 - Music Fighter - "Truth"
- December 15, 2006 — NHK Pop Jam - "Truth"
- December 23, 2006 — MTV's Cool Christmas - "White Christmas" and "Truth"
- December 29, 2006 — Sakigake Ongaku Banzuke - "Precious" and "Truth"

== Charts ==
Oricon Sales Chart (Japan)

Release	Chart	Peak position	First week sales	Sales total	Chart run
6 December 2006	Oricon Daily Chart	10			
6 December 2006	Oricon Weekly Chart	10	15,893	46,780	8 weeks
6 December 2006	Oricon Monthly Chart			-	-
6 December 2006	Oricon Yearly Chart				
