= Love: Singles Best 2005–2010 =

Love: Single's Best 2005–2010

Studio album by Yuna Ito
- Released: December 2010
- Recorded: 2005–2010
- Genre: Pop
- Label: Studioseven Recordings

Yuna Ito chronology
Dream (2009)	Love: Single's Best 2005–2010 (2010)

Love: Single's Best 2005–2010 is American pop singer Yuna Ito's first greatest hit album. The album was released on December 8, 2010 under her label Studioseven Recordings. The album was released in three formats: CD-only, a limited CD+DVD version and a 2 CD version. The CD+DVD version contains all her PVs plus a special video. The 2CD version contains an extra CD with English covers that Yuna covered over her career.

== Track listing ==
No.	Title	Lyrics	Music	Length
1.	"Mamotte Agetai" (守ってあげたい "I Want to Protect You")	H.U.B.	Shinichiro Murayama	5:19
2.	"Let it Go"	Kenn Kato	Hiroo Yamaguchi, Jun Suyama	5:16
3.	"Ima Demo Aitai yo... (feat. Spontania)" (今でも 会いたいよ･･･ "I Still Miss You")	Yuna Ito, Spontania, Jeff Miyahara, Ryll	Yuna Ito, Spontania, Jeff Miyahara, Ryll	3:49
4.	"Trust You"	Markie	Markie	5:22
5.	"Koi wa groovy×2" (恋はgroovy×2 "Love is Groovy Groovy")	Kenn Kato	Kenn Kato	3:37
6.	"Miss You"	Maika Shiratori	Maika Shiratori	5:03
7.	"Anata ga Iru Kagiri: A World to Believe In (with Celine Dion)" (あなたがいる限り～A WORLD TO BELIEVE IN～ "As Long as You are Here")	Tino Izzo, Rosanna Ciciola, John Shanks, Natsumi Kobayashi	Tino Izzo, Rosanna Ciciola, John Shanks	4:09
8.	"Urban Mermaid"	Autsuka Hiwatari	Hayato Tanaka	3:57
9.	"Mahaloha (with Micro of Def Tech)"	Yuna Ito, Micro	Yuna Ito, Micro, Ryohei Shimoyama	4:04
10.	"I'm Here"	Kei Noguchi	Kazuhiro Hara	4:43
11.	"Truth"	Mami Takubo, Narumi Yamamoto	Koji Goto	5:39
12.	"Losin'"	H.U.B.	SiZK, ViVi	4:10
13.	"Stuck on You"	H.U.B.	Hayato Tanaka	4:19
14.	"Precious"	Kei Noguchi	Hayato Tanaka	5:47
15.	"Pureyes"	Kenn Kato	Hiroo Yamaguchi	4:46
16.	"Faith"	Kenn Kato	Bounceback	4:47
17.	"Endless Story"	D.A. Thomas & ats	D.A. Thomas	5:04

Cover CD (2CD version)
No.	Title	Length
1.	"Hard to Say I'm Sorry (Chicago cover)"	3:44
2.	"She (Elvis Costello cover)"	3:28
3.	"I Don't Want to Miss a Thing (Aerosmith cover)"	4:55
4.	"My Heart Will Go On (Celine Dion cover)"	4:44
5.	"These Boots Are Made for Walkin' (Nancy Sinatra cover)"	3:33
6.	"Hero (Mariah Carey cover)"	4:19

DVD (CD+DVD version)
No.	Title	Length
1.	"Mamotte Agetai"
2.	"Let it Go"
3.	"Ima Demo Aitai yo..."
4.	"Trust You"
5.	"Koi wa Groovyx2"
6.	"Miss You"
7.	"Anata ga Iru Kagiri ～A WORLD TO BELIEVE IN～ (with Celine Dion)"
8.	"Urban Mermaid"
9.	"Mahaloha"
10.	"I'm Here"
11.	"Truth"
12.	"Losin'"
13.	"Stuck on You"
14.	"Precious"
15.	"Faith"
16.	"Endless Story"
17.	"LOVE Extra Edition (bonus track)"

== Charts ==
Chart	Peak position	Reported sales
Oricon Daily Chart	4	
Oricon Weekly Chart	8	45,000
