= Losin' =

Single by Yuna Ito

from the album Heart
- Released: September 6, 2006
- Genre: J-pop
- Length: 0:13:54
- Label: Sony Music of Japan
- Songwriters: Kyouko Habu, Toshie Vivi Kiraguchu, Akiyoshu Yasuda

Yuna Ito singles chronology
"Stuck on You" (2006)	"Losin'" (2006)	""Truth"" (2006)

"Losin'" is Yuna Ito's 5th single. This is her second single in her series of hot and cool singles, limited to 70 000 copies. Losin is the Japanese ending theme to Lost Season 2 that airs on AXN.

== Overview ==
Both this single and her previous single, "Stuck on You", were limited to 70,000 copies each. "Stuck on You" was described as "hot" single for the summer while "Losin'" was a "cool" single for the fall. For those who bought both singles, they would receive a special invitation to Yuna Ito's first tour, an invitation-only tour called "Yuna Ito's 1st Invitation". This song features both English and Japanese lyrics.

== Track listing ==
1. Losin'
2. Stay for Love
3. Losin': Simplicity Mix

== Live performances ==
- September 8, 2006 — Music Fighter
- September 16, 2006 — CDTV

== Charts ==
Oricon Sales Chart (Japan)

Release	Chart	Peak position	First week sales	Sales total	Chart run
8 August 2006	Oricon Daily Chart	12			
8 August 2006	Oricon Weekly Chart	19	7,564	10,072	
8 August 2006	Oricon Monthly Chart			-	-
8 August 2006	Oricon Yearly Chart				
