= Miss You (Yuna Ito song) =

Single by Yuna Ito

from the album Dream
- B-side: "Breeeeezin!!!!!!!"
- Released: September 3, 2008
- Recorded: 2008
- Genre: J-pop
- Label: Sony
- Songwriter: Maika Shiratori

Yuna Ito singles chronology
"A World to Believe In" (2008)	"Miss You" (2008)	"Koi wa Groovy x2" (2008)

"Miss You" is the 11th single of Japanese artist Yuna Ito slated for a release on September 3, 2008.

Miss You is currently being used as the Ito En Vitamin Fruit CM song. Miss You was the inspiring song for the cell phone novel "Tenshi no Koi" (天使の恋, lit. The Angel's Love).

== Track list ==
1. Miss You (Hakuchou Maika)
2. Breeeeezin!!!!!!! (Kami Kaoru)
3. Urban Mermaid: Bittersweet Movement Blood-I Riddimix
4. Miss You (Instrumental)

== Magazine promotion ==
1. 8/9: Pati Pati
2. 8/9: Popeye
3. 8/12: What's In?
4. 8/14: CD Data
5. 8/23: Gekkan Kayou Kyoku
6. 8/27: B-Pass

== TV Promotional Performances ==
1. 08/22 - TV Asahi's Music Station
2. 08/04 - Music Japan
3. 08/05 - Music Fighter

== Charts ==
=== Digital Sales Charts ===
Chart	Peak position
Recochoku Chaku-Uta Downloads	40
Recochoku Chaku-Uta All	66

=== Oricon Sales Chart (Japan) ===
Release	Chart	Peak position	First sales	Sales total	Chart run
September 3, 2008	Oricon Daily Singles Chart	13			
September 3, 2008	Oricon Weekly Singles Chart	20	5,593	8,879	2 weeks+
September 3, 2008	Oricon Monthly Singles Chart				
September 3, 2008	Oricon Yearly Singles Chart				
