= Faith/Pureyes =

Single by Yuna Ito

from the album Heart
- Released: March 1, 2006
- Genre: J-pop
- Length: 0:19:04
- Label: Sony Music of Japan

Yuna Ito singles chronology
"Endless Story" (2005)	"Faith/Pureyes" (2006)	"Precious" (2006)

"Faith/Pureyes" is the second single by Yuna Ito, released in 2006. It is a double A-side single that features the two songs "Faith" and "Pureyes". "Faith" is a dark, emotional ballad whereas "Pureyes" is more of an up-beat, pop tune.

"Faith" was the ending theme for the Japanese drama Unfair, whereas "Pureyes" was featured in the Bioclen Zero contact lenses CM.

"Faith/Pureyes" debuted at #4 but fell down the charts in the following days. It ultimately placed at #6 on the Oricon Weekly Charts and sold close to 23,000 copies its first week.

== Track listing ==
1. "Faith"
2. "Pureyes"
3. "Faith: Instrumental"
4. "Pureyes: Instrumental"

== Live performances ==
- March 3, 2006 — Music Station
- March 3, 2006 — Music Fighter

== Charts ==
Oricon Sales Chart (Japan)

Release	Chart	Peak position	First week sales	Sales total	Chart run
1 March 2006	Oricon Daily Chart	4			
1 March 2006	Oricon Weekly Chart	6	22,969 copies	56,359 copies sold	15 weeks
1 March 2006	Oricon Monthly Chart	19		-	-
1 March 2006	Oricon Yearly Chart	160			
