= Stuck on You (Yuna Ito song) =

Single by Yuna Ito
- Released: August 9, 2006
- Genre: J-pop
- Length: 0:12:25
- Label: Sony Music of Japan

Yuna Ito singles chronology
"Precious" (2005)	"Stuck on You" (2006)	"Losin'" (2006)

"Stuck on You" is Yuna Ito's fourth single since her debut. This is her first single since her largely successful May 2006 single "Precious" and her first single in which the main track is not a ballad.

== Overview ==
Both this single and her following single, "Losin'", were limited to 70,000 copies each. "stuck on you" was described as "hot" single for the summer while "losin'" was a "cool" single for the fall. For those who bought both singles, they would receive a special invitation to Yuna Ito's first tour, an invitation-only tour called "Yuna Ito 1st Invitation".

The B-side to this single is "These Boots Are Made for Walkin'", a Nancy Sinatra cover.

== Commercial endorsements ==
While the A-side, "stuck on you," had no commercial endorsements, the B-side, "These boots are made for walkin'," was featured in the Japanese car company Daihatsu's CM for their new car called the COO.

== Track listing ==
1. Stuck on You
2. These Boots Are Made for Walkin'
3. These Boots Are Made for Walkin': Studio Apartment Impulse Groove

== Promotional video ==
The promotional video for "Stuck on You" is the first clip in which we see Ito dance. We can see Ito in a big, fluffy skirt and a corsage with 4 back-up-dancers in a huge room. The 2nd location is a little room, with Ito having curly hair and a violet dress on, and her dancers playing instruments in the background. Another scene is Ito in a yellow dress, lying on a pink carpet, while speaking with a friend on the phone. The last location is a couch with a mirror in front, in which Ito dives at the end. "to be continued..." ends the PV and it will be continued in the "losin'" PV.

== Live performances ==
- August 18, 2006 — Music Station
- August 19, 2006 — MelodiX!

== Charts ==
Oricon Sales Chart (Japan)

Release	Chart	Peak position	First week sales	Sales total	Chart run
9 August 2006	Oricon Daily Chart	12			
9 August 2006	Oricon Weekly Chart	20	9,837	15,000	2 weeks
9 August 2006	Oricon Monthly Chart			-	-
9 August 2006	Oricon Yearly Chart				
