= Heart (Yuna Ito album) =

Studio album by Yuna Ito
- Released: January 24, 2007
- Genre: J-Pop
- Length: 63:29
- Label: Studioseven Recordings

Yuna Ito chronology
Heart (2007)	Wish (2008)

CD + DVD
- CD + DVD cover

Singles from Heart
- 1. "Endless Story" Released: September 7, 2005; 2. "Faith" Released: March 1, 2006; 3. "Precious" Released: May 3, 2006; 4. "Losin'" Released: September 6, 2006; 5. "Truth" Released: December 6, 2006

Heart is the debut album of artist Yuna Ito, released on January 24, 2007. It comes in a CD version, and a limited CD+DVD Version, that includes a 32-special-page-booklet and music videos. Heart debuted at number 1 on the Oricon Weekly Charts for Japan.

== Track listing ==
1. "Workaholic"
2. "Endless Story" (Nana Movie Theme)
3. "Losin'" (AXN's Lost - Season 2 - Theme)
4. "Know-how"
5. "Precious" (Limit of Love - Umizaru - Movie Theme)
6. "Tender Is the Night"
7. "Fragile"
8. "Nobody Knows"
9. "Faith" (KTV CX's Drama Unfair title theme)
10. "Stay for Love"
11. "Truth" (Nana2 Movie Theme)
12. "Perfume"

Bonus tracks:

1. "Precious" (wedding extended ver.)

=== Limited DVD edition ===
1. "Truth" (original version)
2. "Stuck on You"
3. "Faith"
4. "Losin'"
5. "Precious" (Special Version)
6. "Endless Story" (The Memories)

== Sales ==
=== Oricon Sales Chart (Japan) ===
Release	Chart	Peak position	Sales total
January 24, 2007	Oricon Daily Albums Chart	1	
January 24, 2007	Oricon Weekly Albums Chart	1	224,428
January 24, 2007	Oricon Monthly Albums Chart	1	
January 24, 2007	Oricon Yearly Albums Chart	14	523,715

== Singles ==
Date	Title	Peak position	Sales total
September 9, 2005	"Endless Story"	2	471,099
March 1, 2006	"Faith/Pureyes"	6	56,359
May 3, 2006	"Precious"	3	217,319
August 9, 2006	"Stuck on You"	20	15,000
September 6, 2006	"Losin'"	19	10,072
December 6, 2006	"Truth"	10	46,780
