= Saeko Hayashi =

Japanese astronomer

Saeko S. Hayashi (born 1958, Japanese: 林 左絵子) is a Japanese astronomer based in Hawaii whose research interests include star formation, protoplanetary disks, the atmosphere of exoplanets, and the construction and optics of large telescopes. She is an associate professor of the National Astronomical Observatory of Japan and The Graduate University for Advanced Studies and a founding astronomer of Japan's based Subaru Telescope. She is also known for her work popularizing astronomy, both in Japan and in Hawaii.

== Education and career ==
Hayashi was born in 1958 in Akita Prefecture. She was an undergraduate in the Faculty of Science at the University of Tokyo, after taking the admissions examination against her parents' wishes and without their knowledge; she continued at the university for a Ph.D., completed in 1987.

After three years working at the James Clerk Maxwell Telescope in Hawaii, she began working on the Subaru Telescope through the National Astronomical Observatory of Japan in 1990. Although she performed the initial project work in Tokyo, she returned to Hawaii during its construction, and has remained there for the rest of her career. She began on the Thirty Meter Telescope project in 2017, focusing on the development of mirror blanks for the telescope.

== Research ==
Her research focus has shifted from radio astronomy in graduate school, through submillimeter astronomy in her postdoctoral work at the James Clerk Maxwell Telescope, to optical telescopy subsequently, and from observational astronomy to the design and construction of large telescopes.

== Personal life ==
Hayashi is married to Masahiko Hayashi, also an astronomer, the director general of the National Astronomical Observatory of Japan from 2012 to 2018.

== Recognition ==
Minor planet 6250 Saekohayashi, discovered in 1991, is named for her.
