= Natsuki Okamoto =

Natsuki Okamoto may refer to:

- Natsuki Okamoto (actress, born 1965), Japanese tarento, race queen and gravure idol
- Natsuki Okamoto (actress, born 1989), Japanese fashion model and actress

== See also ==
- Natsumi Okamoto (born 1998), Japanese actress and fashion model
