= A World to Believe In =

Single by Celine Dion and Yuna Ito

from the album Taking Chances
- Released: 16 January 2008
- Studio: At the Palms (Las Vegas); Henson Recording; The Studio
- Genre: Pop
- Length: 4:08
- Label: SMEJ
- Songwriters: Tino Izzo; Rosanna Ciciola
- Producer: John Shanks

Celine Dion singles chronology
"Eyes on Me" (2008)	"A World to Believe In" (2008)	"The Prayer" (2008)

Yuna Ito singles chronology
"Urban Mermaid" (2007)	"A World to Believe In" (2007)	"Miss You" (2008)

Audio
- "A World to Believe In" on YouTube

"A World to Believe In" is a song recorded by Canadian singer Celine Dion for her tenth English‑language studio album, Taking Chances (2007). Written by Tino Izzo and Rosanna Ciciola and produced by Grammy Award–winning producer John Shanks, it was later re‑recorded as a bilingual English–Japanese duet with Japanese singer Yuna Ito. Issued in Japan on 16 January 2008 as the second single from Taking Chances, the duet also served as the lead single from Dion's compilation Complete Best released the same year. It was additionally included on Ito's album Wish. The duet became a commercial success in Japan, reaching number three on the Billboard Japan Hot 100 and number eight on the Oricon Singles Chart.

== Background and release ==
Dion originally recorded "A World to Believe In" as a solo English‑language track for her 2007 album Taking Chances. After hearing Yuna Ito's cover of "My Heart Will Go On" on the Japan‑only tribute album Tribute to Céline Dion, released in September 2007, she proposed recording a duet.

In October 2007, Dion and Ito recorded a bilingual English–Japanese version titled "あなたがいる限り 〜A World to Believe In〜". The Japanese lyrics were written by Natsumi Kobayashi, and the duet was co‑produced by Kenji Tamai. It premiered in a LISMO cellphone service commercial that began airing on 1 December 2007.

The four‑track single was released in Japan on 16 January 2008. "あなたがいる限り 〜A World to Believe In〜" appeared on Ito's album Wish issued on 20 February 2008, while the U.S.A. mix was included on Dion's compilation Complete Best released on 27 February 2008.

== Commercial performance ==
The single debuted at number eight on the Japanese Oricon Singles Chart with 11,778 copies sold. In its second week, it fell to number 22 with 5,399 copies sold. After eight weeks, total sales reached 24,105 copies. On the Oricon Daily Singles Chart, it peaked at number six. The duet also reached number three on the Billboard Japan Hot 100.

== Music video ==
The music video was filmed in Las Vegas, Nevada, in October 2007. It shows Dion and Ito in the recording studio. Released on 6 December 2007, the video was nominated for Best Collaboration Video at the MTV Video Music Awards Japan. It was later included on Ultimate Box, a set containing two CDs and three DVDs.

== Live performances ==
Ito supported Dion's concerts in Japan during the Taking Chances World Tour, and both artists performed the duet live on stage in March 2008.

== Formats and track listing ==
- Japanese CD single
1. "あなたがいる限り 〜A World to Believe In〜" – 4:08
2. "あなたがいる限り 〜A World to Believe In〜" (U.S.A. mix) – 4:08
3. "あなたがいる限り 〜A World to Believe In〜" (Yuna Ito solo version) – 4:08
4. "あなたがいる限り 〜A World to Believe In〜" (instrumental) – 4:08

== Charts ==
Chart performance
Chart (2008)	Peak position
Japan (Japan Hot 100)	3
Japan (Oricon Singles Chart)	8

== Japanese film version ==
The melody of "A World to Believe In" was reworked with new Japanese lyrics for the Yukihiko Tsutsumi‑directed film Maboroshi no Yamataikoku (lit. 'The Phantom Yamatai Kingdom'), starring Sayuri Yoshinaga and Naoto Takenaka, which premiered on 1 November 2008. Dion recorded a new Japanese‑language version for the soundtrack. Both the single and the soundtrack were released in Japan on 22 October 2008.

The CD single's release coincided with My Love: Essential Collection, a compilation not issued in Japan because Complete Best had already been released earlier that year. To provide the Japanese market with material unavailable locally, the single included two previously unreleased tracks, "My Love" (live) and "There Comes a Time", and used a cover photo from the new compilation. It debuted on 3 November 2008 at number 158 on the Japanese Oricon Singles Chart.

=== Formats and track listing ===
- Japanese CD single
1. "A World to Believe In -Himiko Fantasia-" – 4:08
2. "A World to Believe In" (album version) – 4:08
3. "My Love" (live version) – 5:04
4. "There Comes a Time" – 4:03

=== Charts ===
Chart performance
Chart (2008)	Peak position
Japan (Oricon Singles Chart)	158

== Release history ==
Release history
Region	Date	Format	Version	Label	Ref.
Japan	16 January 2008	CD	あなたがいる限り 〜A World to Believe In〜	SMEJ	
Japan	22 October 2008	CD	A World to Believe In -Himiko Fantasia-	SMEJ	
