= Ima Demo Zutto =

"Ima Demo Zutto 今でもずっと"

Single by Spontania feat. Yuna Ito
- Released: January 28, 2009
- Recorded: 2008
- Label: Far Eastern Tribe Records
- Songwriter(s): Spontania, Yuna Ito, Jeff Miyahara
- Producer(s): Spontania, Yuna Ito, Jeff Miyahara, Ryll, Coco

Spontania singles chronology
"Kimi no Subete ni" (2008)	"Ima Demo Zutto" (2009)	"Natsuyume" (2009)

Yuna Ito singles chronology
"Koi wa Groovy x2" (2008)	"Ima Demo Zutto" (2009)	"Trust You" (2009)

"Ima Demo Zutto" (今でもずっと, lit. "Even More Now") is a single by Japanese duo Spontania featuring singer Yuna Ito. It was released on January 28, 2009.

== Promotion ==
Promotion started at a Christmas event, where the trio performed the single. To further promote the single, Spontania and Ito performed the single on three music shows, NHK Music Japan, NTV Music Fighter and Music Fair.

== Track list ==
1. "Ima Demo Zutto"
2. "My Life"
3. "Ima Demo Zutto" (Instrumental)
4. "My Life" (Instrumental)

== Charts ==
=== Billboard Japan chart ===
Chart	Peak position
Billboard Japan Hot 100	6

=== Oricon ===
Release	Chart	Peak position	First week sales	Total sales	Chart run
January 28, 2009	Oricon Daily Singles Chart				
January 28, 2009	Oricon Weekly Singles Chart	22	5,401	5,401+	1 week+
January 28, 2009	Oricon Monthly Singles Chart				
January 28, 2009	Oricon Yearly Singles Chart				
