= Spontania =

Japanese musical group

- Also known as: Hi-Timez
- Origin: Japan
- Genres: Hip hop; reggae; J-pop
- Years active: 1996–present
- Labels: Capitol; Far Eastern Tribe; Primary Color
- Members: Massattack; Tarantula; Kaori
- Website: spontania.japan

Spontania (スポンテニア, Supontenia) is a Japanese hip-hop/reggae group. The name "Spontania" comes from the English word "spontaneous".

In 2010, singer Kaori Natori became the permanent vocalist for the band.

== Members ==
- Massattack (マサタック masatakku^{?})
  - Born in Yokohama. Studied in Boston while in high school. DJ'd in New York City before debuting in Japan and was associated with Yuta and the Bushido Boys.
- Tarantula (タランチュラ taranchura^{?})
  - Born 17 June 1977, Tokyo. Went abroad to the United States while in high school.
  - Is the rapper for the song "'Libera Me'from Hell" used in Gurren Lagann.
- Kaori
  - Born September 3, 1982, Tokyo. Became a vocalist of the group in March 2010.

== History ==
In 1996, they met in New York City and formed the group "Hi-Timez". In 2004, they debuted under Toshiba-EMI sublabel Capitol Music as Hi-Timez. In 2007, they met Micro from Def Tech, who had just established his own label Primary Color Recordz, under Universal Music Japan's Far Eastern Tribe Records label. The group's name was changed from Hi-Timez to Spontania.

== Discography ==
=== Singles ===
==== Hi-Timez ====
Year	Title	Peak
Year	Title	JPN
2004	"In My Words (Kotoba ni Dekinai)"	126
2004	"Spark!"	184
2004	"Leavin' My Love"	—
2005	"Break Yourself"	96
2005	"Sunshine"	152
2006	"That's It No More (We Show)"	—
"—" denotes releases that did not chart or were not released in that region.

==== Spontania ====
Year	Title	Peak
Year	Title	JPN
2007	"Positivity"	132
2007	"Hanabi/It's Ok"	35
2008	"Sayonara..."	45
2008	"Kimi no Subete ni"	7
2009	"Ima Demo Zutto"	22
2009	"Natsu Yume"	96
2009	"Another Story (Ai Story Spontania Version)"	40
2009	"Onaji Sora Mitsumeteru Anata ni"	31
2010	"The Love Songs"	—
2010	"Jam"	—
"—" denotes releases that did not chart or were not released in that region.

=== Albums ===
==== Hi-Timez ====
Year	Album details	Peak
Year	Album details	JPN
2004	My Words: Released: July 22, 2004; Label: Capitol (TOCT-26554); Format: CD	238
2005	Goo Goo Hoo: Released: September 22, 2005; Label: Capitol (TOCT-25747); Format: CD	123

==== Spontania ====
Year	Album details	Peak
Year	Album details	JPN
2007	Spontaneous: Released: September 26, 2007; Label: Primary Color, Far Eastern Tribe (UMCF-1006); Format: CD, digital download, streaming	76
2008	Music: Released: October 1, 2008; Label: Primary Color, Far Eastern Tribe (UMCF-1015); Format: CD, digital download, streaming	10
2009	Collaborations Best: Released: November 18, 2009; Label: Primary Color, Far Eastern Tribe (UMCF-9522, UMCF-1027); Format: CD+DVD, CD, digital download, streaming	13
