= Precious (Yuna Ito song) =

Single by Yuna Ito

from the album Heart
- Released: May 3, 2006
- Genre: J-pop
- Length: 0:20:06
- Label: Sony Music of Japan

Yuna Ito singles chronology
"Faith/Pureyes" (2006)	"Precious" (2006)	"Stuck on You" (2006)

"Precious" is the third single by Yuna Ito. It is the theme song to the movie Limit of Love: Umizaru (starring Hideaki Ito and Ai Kato) and was released on May 3, 2006. Both "I'm Free" and "Secrets" are more up-beat songs than "Precious".

"Precious" reached a peak of #2 on the daily charts and #3 on the weekly charts. The following week, her single stayed high on the charts and was #3 for the second week in a row. Her sales jumped from 39,000 copies the first week to 44,000 copies the second week. In two weeks, it has already surpassed the sales of her last single, "Faith/Pureyes".

This single has been billed as a double b-side single due to the fact it has 2 b-sides.

On the half-yearly charts of 2006, "Precious" was the 2nd most-downloaded song, 3rd most-downloaded ringtone, 5th most-downloaded PV, and overall (combined ranking for all 3 categories) ranked 2nd.

The PV (promotional video) for the title track "Precious" was shot in New Zealand, where Ito and her staff stayed for 5 days.

Despite the song being released for more than two years, it managed to climb back up the charts, with a peak of 17.

== Track listing ==
1. Precious
2. I’m Free
3. Secrets
4. Precious: Instrumental

== Live performances ==
- April 29, 2006 — CDTV - "Precious"
- April 29, 2006 — Music Fair 21 - "Precious" + "Endless Story"
- May 5, 2006 — Music Station - "Precious"
- May 5, 2006 — Music Fighter - "Precious"
- May 26, 2006 — Music Station - "Precious"
- November 20, 2006 — Best Hit Song Festival 2006 - "Precious"
- December 6, 2006 — FNS Kayousai 2006 - "Precious"
- December 16, 2006 — 39th Japan Cable Awards (Nihon Yusen Taisho) - "Precious"
- December 29, 2006 — Sakigake Ongaku Banzuke - "Precious" and "Truth"
- December 31, 2006 — CDTV 2006-2007 Special - "Precious"

== Charts ==
Oricon Sales Chart (Japan)

Release	Chart	Peak position	First week sales	Sales total	Chart run
3 May 2006	Oricon Daily Singles Chart	2			
3 May 2006	Oricon Weekly Singles Chart	3	38,583 copies	217,319 copies	29 weeks
3 May 2006	Oricon Monthly Singles Chart	6		-	-
3 May 2006	Oricon Yearly Singles Chart	42			
