= Endless Story =

Single by Yuna Ito

from the album Heart
- B-side: "Journey"
- Released: September 7, 2005
- Label: Sony Music Japan
- Composer: Dawn Thomas
- Lyricist: Dawn Thomas; ATS

Yuna Ito singles chronology
"Endless Story" (2005)	"Faith/Pureyes" (2006)

"Endless Story" is the debut single by Japanese singer Yuna Ito, released under the name Reira starring Yuna Ito, by Sony Japan on September 7, 2005. "Endless Story" was written by Dawn Thomas with Japanese lyrics by ATS and was used in the film Nana (2005) in which Ito played the character Reira Serizawa. The song samples Dawn Thomas's "If I'm Not in Love" (1993) which was also covered by Faith Hill in 1999.

Commercially, "Endless Story" peaked at #2 on both the daily and weekly charts its first week, and reached #1 on the daily charts on multiple occasions. At the end of 2005, "Endless Story" was named the "Best Love Song of 2005" by the Oricon magazine. It holds the record for the most downloaded debut song by a female artist. As of January 2007, the single has sold 471,099 copies.

== Track listing ==
Digital Download
No.	Title	Lyrics	Music	Length
1.	"Endless Story"	Dawn Thomas; ATS	Thomas	5:03
2.	"Journey"	Saeko Nishio	Yuta Nakano	5:22
Total length:				10:28

CD single
No.	Title	Lyrics	Music	Length
1.	"Endless Story"	Dawn Thomas; ATS	Thomas	5:03
2.	"Journey"	Saeko Nishio	Yuta Nakano	5:22
3.	"Endless Story" (instrumental)		Thomas	5:03
4.	"Journey" (instrumental)		Nakano	5:22
Total length:				20:54

== Charts ==
=== Weekly charts ===
Weekly chart performance for "Endless Story"
Chart (2005)	Peak position
Japan Singles Chart (Oricon)	2

=== Monthly charts ===
Monthly chart performance for "Endless Story"
Chart (2005)	Peak position
Japan Singles Chart (Oricon)	2

=== Year-end chart ===
Year-end chart performance for "Endless Story"
Chart (2005)	Peak position
Japan Singles Chart (Oricon)	20

== Cover versions ==
Japanese singer Hideaki Tokunaga covered the song on his 2007 album Vocalist 3.

Taiwanese singer Saya Chang covered "Endless Story" and renamed it "Xiang Nian Ni De Ge".

Hong Kong singer Janice Vidal also covered the song as "Cloudy Holidays" on her 2008 Cantonese album, Serving You.
