= Def Tech =

Japanese pop band

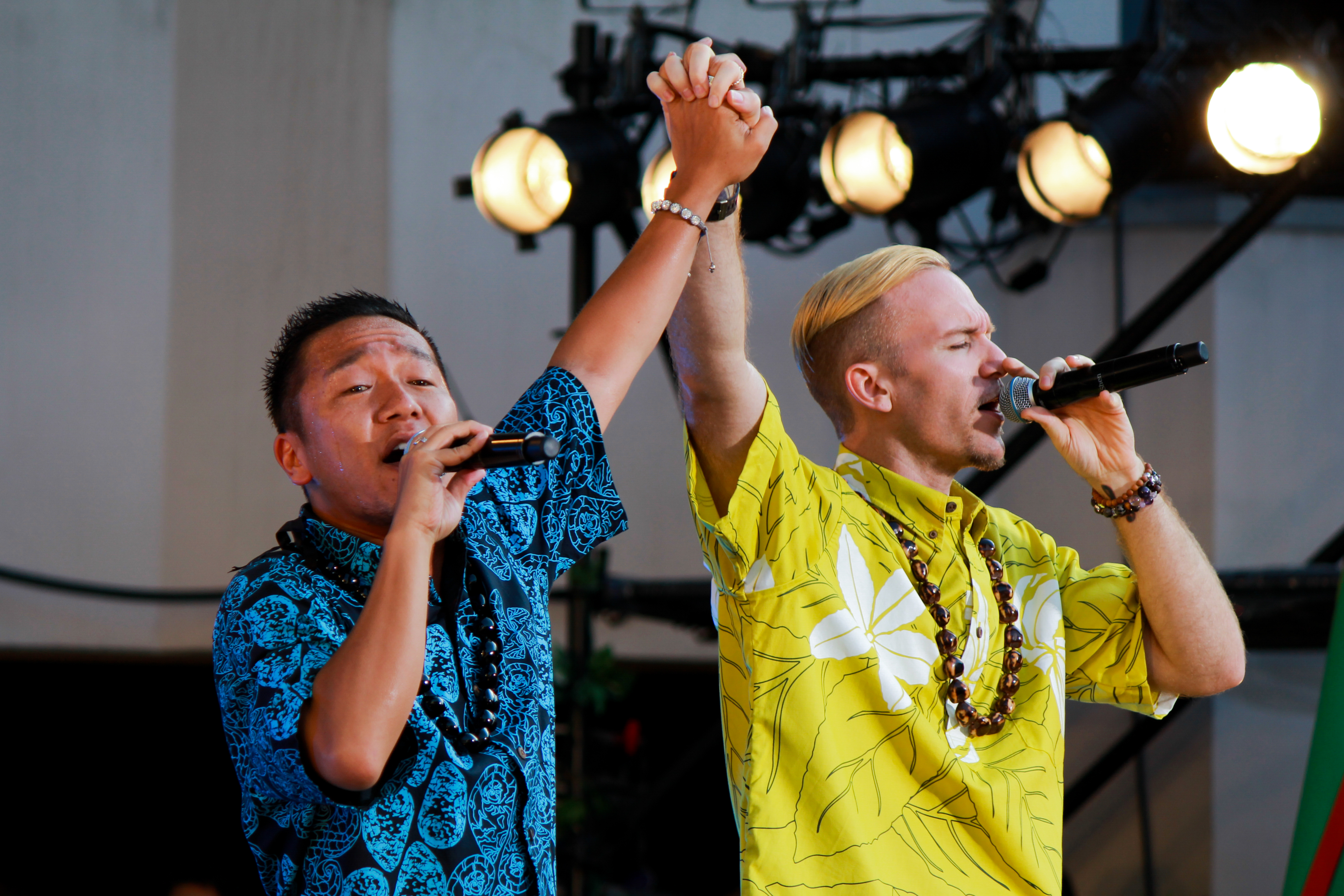
- Def Tech Shen And Micro

Background information
- Origin: Japan
- Genres: Jawaiian Reggae
- Years active: 2005-2007; 2010-present
- Labels: 2VOX Ltd.
- Members: Shen, Micro
- Website: deftech.jp

Def Tech is a Japanese pop band signed to 2VOX Ltd, an independent label.

== Career ==
Jesse, the vocalist from Rize, named the band, the members of which did their own songwriting, arranging, and production. Def Tech had the 3rd best-selling album in Japan in 2005 and performed at Live8 in Tokyo in July of that year. Def Tech started in 2003 and debuted in 2005. They rocketed in popularity, especially due to their song "My Way," and their first, self-titled album charted at #1 and went on to sell 2.8 million copies. That same year (2005), they became the first indie label artist to perform at NHK's Kohaku Uta Gassen.

In September 2007 Def Tech broke up, citing different opinions on music direction. The band reunited in June 2010.

== Personnel ==
- Shen (b. Shenan Brown. on May 9, 1981 in the People's Republic of China) - grew up in Hawaii. Shen visited Japan many times growing up because of his father's job in applied linguistics. Shen is bilingual in English and Japanese.
- Micro (b. 西宮佑騎 Nishimiya Yūki August 28, 1980) is originally from Ōta, Tokyo. A Hosei University graduate, Micro created a label, Primary Color Recordz, under Universal Music in February 2007.

== Album Oricon sales milestones ==
Album

- [2005.01.22] Def Tech (2,800,000) [2.8 million]
- [2005.06.29] Lokahi Lani (500,000) [double platinum]
- [2006.04.26] Catch The Wave (1,000,000) [million]
- [2010.10.27] Mind Shift (100,000) [gold]
- [2012.04.18] Greatest Hits (100,000) [gold]

== Awards and honors ==
- 2005 Tokio Hot 100 Awards - Best Song - "My Way"
- 2005 Tokio Hot 100 Awards - Best New Artist
- 2006 MTV Video Music Awards Japan - Best Group Video - "Konomama"

== Discography ==
Single

- [2005.09.03] Canción de la expansión - Only on iTunes (Limited)
- [2012.07.15] Bolero - Only on iTunes
- [2013.05.15] Be The One - Only on iTunes

Album

- [2005.01.22] Def Tech
- [2005.06.29] Lokahi Lani
- [2006.04.26] Catch the Wave
- [2010.10.27] Mind Shift
- [2011.10.05] UP
- [2013.07.10] 24/7
- [2015.06.03] Howzit!?
- [2016.07.06] Eight
- [2020.11.18] Powers of Ten

Best Album

- [2005.06.29] 1 x 2 (Def Tech & Lokahi Lani in a full Album) - Only on iTunes
- [2012.04.18] GREATEST HITS (1st Best)
- [2012.08.29] Official Bootleg Mix - Only on iTunes
- [2014.11.19] Def Tech Best Mix (2nd Best) [Mix CD]
- [2015.06.03] Micro's Collection (Select Best Album) - Only on iTunes
- [2015.06.03] Shen's Collection (Select Best Album) - Only on iTunes

Box Set

- [2020.11.11] Def Tech Special Box Set (9CD + 2DVD)

DVD

- [2006.12.27] Def Tech - BUDOKAN Live [Live DVD]
- [2006.12.27] Def Tech - OKINAWA Live [Live DVD]
- [2007.06.13] Footage (Music Video Collection) - Only on iTunes
- [2012.04.18] GREATEST HITS - [Music Video collection included with Greatest Hits release]
- [2013.07.10] Def Tech: Concert Film 2006 - Only on iTunes
- [2014.11.19] Def Tech Best Mix - [Music Video collection included with Best Album Mix release]

Def Tech selects Omnibus Album

- [2006.06.28] Def Tech presents Jawaiian Style Records ～Haleiwa～
- [2006.06.28] Def Tech presents Jawaiian Style Records ～Laniakea～
- [2006.06.28] Def Tech presents Jawaiian Style Records ～Waimea～
- [2006.06.28] Def Tech presents Jawaiian Style Records ～Ehukai～

Remixes [Produced & performed by Def Tech]

- [2006.06.28] Broken Hearts [Jawaiian Mix]
- [2006.06.28] Emergency [Jawaiian Mix]
- [2006.06.28] In Outside [Jawaiian Mix]
- [2013.07.10] He'eia [Jawaiian Mix]
- [2014.11.19] My Way [Original Acoustic Mix Version]
- [2015.06.03] Gone Surfin' [Jawaiian Mix]
- [2016.07.06] Journey [Tropical Juice Mix]
- [2019.07.03] High On Life [Cloud 9 Remix]
- [2019.07.17] Catch The Wave [Dub Remix]

Collaborations [With Def Tech]

- [2003.01.22] VIBRATION (RIZE introducing Def Tech)
- [2005.01.22] Quality of Life (feat. YUKI from Bennie K)
- [2005.06.29] Lokahi Lani (feat. JAMOSA)
- [2005.06.29] KONOMAMA (Def Tech re-introducing RIZE)
- [2005.07.06] KONOMAMA-Tensaibaka [Original Version] (RIZE backing Def Tech)
- [2006.04.26] Lift Up (feat. Lafa Taylor)
- [2006.04.26] Off the Edge (feat. WISE)
- [2006.04.26] Inori (feat. SAKURA)
- [2010.10.27] F.M.B!! (feat. MAYA)
- [2011.10.05] My Baby Love (feat. Ernie Cruz Jr.)
- [2011.10.05] Muteki (feat. Ernie Cruz Jr.)
- [2013.07.10] Anniversary (feat. SONPUB)
- [2013.07.10] The Key (feat. Emi Meyer)
- [2013.07.10] Just a Little Longer (feat. Xavier Boyer Of Tahiti 80)
- [2013.07.10] He'eia [Jawaiian Mix] (feat. Makana)
- [2015.06.03] One Day (feat. Jake Shimabukuro)

List of songs featuring Def Tech

- [2003.01.22] Vibration (RIZE introducing Def Tech)
- [2004.05.08] Better Days (Bennie K feat. Def Tech)
- [2006.06.02] Jump Around (Dan feat. Shen [from Def Tech])
- [2007.06.27] Mahaloha (Yuna Ito feat. Micro [from Def Tech])
