= Studioseven Recordings =

Japanese record label

- Parent company: Sony Music Japan
- Founded: 2006
- Defunct: March 2010
- Country of origin: Japan

Studioseven Recordings was a Japanese record label founded in 2006 which was a subsidiary of Sony Music Records. After its dissolution in 2010, many of its artists were moved to Sony Music Records' gr8! Records label.

== History ==
The label first came to light when Sony was to release a single for singer/songwriter YUI (it should be Good-bye Days for the movie Midnight Sun). It was later expanded through Kaoru Amane’s debut single (Taiyou no Uta for the drama version of the movie). Since then, Studioseven Recordings is to take part in co-productions with movies.

=== Recent history ===
In November 2006, the label welcomed Nana-star Yuna Ito and Korean/Japanese star K (who claimed to fame with the theme song for 1 Litre of Tears drama). The label's current chief producer is Yoshio Imano.

The first official release for Studioseven Recordings was the debut album of Yuna Ito, Heart, which sold over 200.000 copies in its first week.

=== Artists ===
==== Present ====
- Yuna Ito
- June
- K
- Little by Little
- Maria
- YUI
- Meisa Kuroki

==== Former ====
- Erika Sawajiri (moved to Avex Trax last 2010)

== See also ==
- List of record labels
