= Push Baby discography =

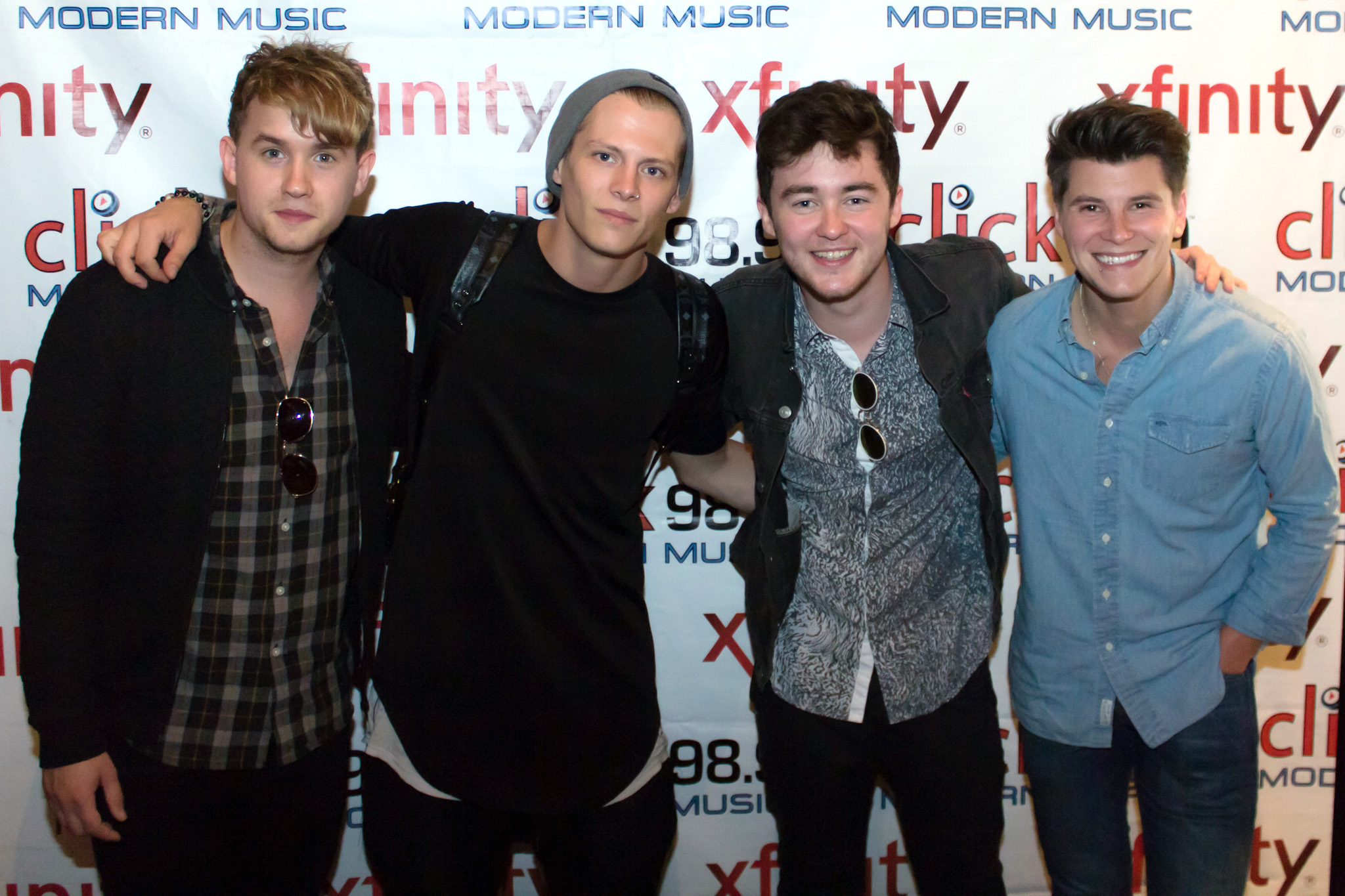
- Push Baby at the Click 98.9 New Artist Showcase, August 2014. From left to right: Danny Wilkin, Lewi Morgan, Jake Roche and Charley Bagnall.
- Studio albums: 3
- EPs: 3
- Singles: 17
- Music videos: 20

The discography of Push Baby (previously called Rixton), a British pop rock band. Their debut studio album, Let the Road, was released in March 2015. The album peaked at number 19 on the UK Albums Chart and number 32 on the US Billboard 200 chart. The album includes the singles "Me and My Broken Heart", "Wait on Me", "Hotel Ceiling" and "We All Want the Same Thing". The song "Me and My Broken Heart" reached number one on the UK Singles Chart and reached the Top 20 on the US Billboard Hot 100. Their second studio album, Wow, Big Legend, was released in July 2021, and their third studio album, Wow, That's What I Call Push Baby!, was released in October 2022.

== Studio albums ==
List of studio albums, with selected chart positions
| Title | Details | Peak chart positions | |
| Title | Details | UK | US |
|---|---|---|---|
| Let the Road (Note: as Rixton) | Released: 3 March 2015; Credited as: Rixton; Label: School Boy, Giant Little Man, Mad Love, Interscope; Formats: CD, digital download, streaming | 19 | 32 |
| Wow, Big Legend | Released: 18 June 2021; Credited as: Push Baby; Label: Wow, Big Legend; Formats: Digital download, streaming | — | — |
| Wow, That's What I Call Push Baby! | Released: 21 October 2022; Credited as: Push Baby; Label: Wow, Big Legend; Formats: Digital download, streaming | — | — |
"—" denotes a recording that did not chart or was not released in that territory.

== Extended plays ==
List of extended plays
| Title | Details |
|---|---|
| Me and My Broken Heart | Released: 18 March 2014; Credited as: Rixton; Label: School Boy, Giant Little Man, Mad Love, Interscope; Formats: CD, digital download, streaming |
| This Is Acoustic (Live Session) | Released: 17 July 2015; Credited as: Rixton; Label: School Boy, Giant Little Man, Mad Love, Interscope; Formats: Digital download, streaming |
| Woah | Released: 27 September 2019; Credited as: Push Baby; Label: School Boy, Republic; Formats: CD, digital download |
"—" denotes a recording that did not chart or was not released in that territory.

== Singles ==
List of singles, with selected chart positions and certifications, showing year released and album name
| Title | Year | Peak chart positions | | | | | | | | | | | Certifications | Album |
| Title | Year | UK | AUS | CAN | DEN | FRA | GER | IRE | NL | SWE | SWI | US | Certifications | Album |
|---|---|---|---|---|---|---|---|---|---|---|---|---|---|---|
Credited as Rixton
| "Me and My Broken Heart" | 2014 | 1 | 43 | 17 | 6 | 84 | 91 | 12 | 46 | 33 | 69 | 14 | BPI: Platinum; GLF: Platinum; IFPI DEN: 2× Platinum; IFPI DEN: Platinum (Note: Streaming); MC: Gold; RIAA: Platinum | Let the Road |
| "Wait on Me" | 2014 | 12 | — | — | — | — | — | 62 | — | — | — | — | | Let the Road |
| "Hotel Ceiling" | 2015 | — | — | — | — | — | — | — | — | — | — | — | | Let the Road |
| "We All Want the Same Thing" | 2015 | 21 | — | — | — | — | — | — | — | — | — | — | | Let the Road |
| "Sorry to Interrupt" (with Jessie J and Jhené Aiko) | 2015 | — | — | — | — | — | — | — | — | — | — | — | | Non-album single |
Credited as Push Baby
| "Mama's House" | 2019 | — | — | — | — | — | — | — | — | — | — | — | | Non-album single |
| "Holding on Is Holding You Back" | 2020 | — | — | — | — | — | — | — | — | — | — | — | | Wow, Big Legend |
| "Wishing We Were More Than Friends" | 2020 | — | — | — | — | — | — | — | — | — | — | — | | Wow, Big Legend |
| "Man in His Bedroom" | 2020 | — | — | — | — | — | — | — | — | — | — | — | | Wow, Big Legend |
| "Wanna Go" | 2020 | — | — | — | — | — | — | — | — | — | — | — | | Wow, Big Legend |
| "Aegean" | 2020 | — | — | — | — | — | — | — | — | — | — | — | | Wow, Big Legend |
| "Cry/Talk About It" | 2021 | — | — | — | — | — | — | — | — | — | — | — | | Wow, Big Legend |
| "LOSE IT! LOSE IT!" | 2021 | — | — | — | — | — | — | — | — | — | — | — | | Wow, That’s What I Call Push Baby! |
| "WHAT YA GONNA DO?" | 2022 | — | — | — | — | — | — | — | — | — | — | — | | Wow, That’s What I Call Push Baby! |
| "Change My Mind" | 2022 | — | — | — | — | — | — | — | — | — | — | — | | Wow, That’s What I Call Push Baby! |
| "Circles" | 2022 | — | — | — | — | — | — | — | — | — | — | — | | Wow, That’s What I Call Push Baby! |
| "Every time I think about you baby, I hate it, you blow my mind" | 2022 | — | — | — | — | — | — | — | — | — | — | — | | Wow, That’s What I Call Push Baby! |
"—" denotes a single that did not chart or was not released in that territory.

=== Promotional singles ===
List of promotional singles, showing year released and album name
| Title | Year | Album |
|---|---|---|
Credited as Rixton
| "Make Out" | 2013 | Let the Road |

== Music videos ==
List of music videos, showing year released
| Title | Year |
|---|---|
Credited as Rixton
| "Make Out" | 2013 |
| "Me and My Broken Heart" | 2014 |
| "Wait on Me" | 2014 |
| "Hotel Ceiling" | 2015 |
| "We All Want the Same Thing" | 2015 |
Credited as Push Baby
| "Mama's House" | 2019 |
| "@thebackoftheparty" | 2019 |
| "CALI SUPERBLOOM" | 2019 |
| "thenineteenseventyfive" | 2019 |
| "i think i love you (but i dont like you)" | 2019 |
| "You don't like the colour orange" | 2019 |
| "Wishing We Were More Than Friends" | 2020 |
| "Man in His Bedroom" | 2020 |
| "WANNA GO" | 2020 |
| "Aegean" | 2021 |
| "Cry / TALK ABOUT IT" | 2021 |
| "LOSE IT! LOSE IT!" | 2022 |
| "Change My Mind" | 2022 |
| "Circles" | 2022 |
| "Every time I think about you baby, I hate it, you blow my mind" | 2022 |
