= The Gift (Celine Dion song) =

Song by Celine Dion

from the album Love Again: Soundtrack from the Motion Picture
- Released: 12 May 2023
- Studio: At the Palms (Las Vegas); Vibeland (New York); MixStar (Virginia Beach)
- Genre: Pop
- Length: 3:24
- Label: Columbia
- Songwriters: James G. Morales; Matt Morales; Dave Rodriguez; Tina Parol; Jason Wade
- Producer: The Elev3n

Audio
- "The Gift" on YouTube

"The Gift" is a song by Canadian singer Celine Dion from the soundtrack album Love Again (2023). Written by members of The Elev3n with Tina Parol and Jason Wade, and produced by the group, the track appears in the film's opening sequence. It received positive critical notices and reached number two on both the sales and radio charts in Quebec.

== Background and release ==
After releasing Courage in 2019 and beginning the Courage World Tour, Dion joined the cast of the American romantic comedy‑drama Love Again, directed by James C. Strouse. Filming began in October 2020 and concluded in early 2021.

Dion recorded five new songs for the film, including "Love Again", released on 13 April 2023. It was her first new material in four years and followed her December 2022 announcement that she had been diagnosed with stiff-person syndrome. A second track, "I'll Be", followed on 5 May 2023.

"The Gift" was issued as part of the Love Again soundtrack on 12 May 2023. It appears in the film's opening sequence. The song was written by The Elev3n, together with Tina Parol and Jason Wade, and produced by the group.

In 2019, the same team wrote and produced "Soul", recorded by Dion for Courage and included on the Japanese edition of the album. "Soul" was released worldwide on digital and streaming platforms on 10 January 2020.

== Critical reception ==
Entertainment Focus described "The Gift" as an unexpectedly upbeat moment, comparable to the direction Dion explored on Courage.

== Commercial performance ==
Following the soundtrack's release, "The Gift" debuted and peaked at number two on the Quebec Digital Sales chart. As it gained radio airplay in Quebec, the song entered the Radio chart at number eight in early June 2023 and later rose to number two in the first week of July 2023.

== Credits and personnel ==
Recording

- Recorded at Studio at the Palms (Las Vegas) and Vibeland Studios (New York); produced at Creative House (Los Angeles)
- Mixed at MixStar Studios (Virginia Beach)

Personnel

- Celine Dion – lead vocals
- James G. Morales – composer, lyricist, programming
- Matt Morales – composer, lyricist, programming, engineering, vocal production
- Dave Rodriguez – composer, lyricist
- Tina Parol – composer, lyricist, background vocals
- Jason Wade – composer, lyricist
- The Elev3n – producer
- Jacob Evergreen – guitar
- Bryce Bordone – assistant mix engineer
- Francois Lalonde – engineer for lead vocals
- Rob Katz – assistant engineer for lead vocals

== Charts ==
Chart performance
Chart (2023)	Peak position
Quebec Digital Song Sales (ADISQ)	2
Quebec Radio Songs (ADISQ)	2
