= I Am: Celine Dion =

2024 documentary film directed by Irene Taylor

- Film poster
- Directed by: Irene Taylor
- Produced by: Stacy Lorts; Tom Mackay; Julie Begey Seureau; Irene Taylor
- Starring: Celine Dion; René-Charles Angélil; Nelson Angélil; Eddy Angélil
- Cinematography: Nick Midwig
- Edited by: Richard Comeau; Christian Jensen
- Music by: Redi Hasa
- Production companies: Metro-Goldwyn-Mayer; Sony Music Entertainment; Les Productions Feeling; Vermilion Films
- Distributed by: Amazon MGM Studios
- Release dates: 17 June 2024 (New York); 21 June 2024 (United States); 25 June 2024 (Prime Video)
- Running time: 103 minutes
- Country: United States
- Languages: English; French
- Box office: $292,990

I Am: Celine Dion is a 2024 American documentary film directed by Irene Taylor. The film follows Canadian singer Celine Dion as she looks back on her life and career while addressing her diagnosis with stiff-person syndrome. It premiered in New York on 17 June 2024 and received a limited theatrical release on 21 June 2024 through Amazon MGM Studios. The documentary became available for streaming on 25 June 2024 on Amazon Prime Video. In Francophone markets, it was released as Je suis: Céline Dion.

Critics responded positively, noting the film's intimate focus on Dion's personal and professional challenges. It also drew strong viewership on streaming, becoming the number-one film on Amazon Prime Video worldwide shortly after release and ranking as the platform's most-watched documentary to date. The accompanying I Am: Celine Dion soundtrack was issued on 21 June 2024.

== Production ==
Sony Music announced in September 2021 that a feature-length documentary about Dion was in development, with the singer granting access to her personal and professional life. In January 2024, the film's official title was revealed as I Am: Celine Dion, and Amazon MGM Studios acquired distribution rights. The first trailer was released on 23 May 2024.

== Reception ==
=== Critical reception ===
I Am: Celine Dion received generally positive reviews. On the review aggregator website Rotten Tomatoes, 100% of 45 critics' reviews are positive, with an average rating of 8.3/10. The website's consensus reads: "Cutting through cliche with an earnest and open closet of vulnerability, I Am is a moving portrait of resilience, proving that Celine Dion will go on." Metacritic, which uses a weighted average, assigned the film a score of 76 out of 100, based on 12 critics, indicating "generally favorable" reviews.

Chris Azzopardi of The New York Times wrote that "Dion's voice made her a star; this film is keen on making her a person". Peter Debruge of Variety described the documentary as "intensely personal and sincere". Suzannah Ramsdale of the Evening Standard called it "a raw, heartbreaking and deeply moving window into the reclusive life of a once-in-a-generation talent". Diego Batlle of otroscines.com described it as "a visceral, cathartic, confessional" work. Dennis Schwartz of Ozus's World Movie Reviews referred to it as an inspirational documentary.

=== Audience viewership ===
I Am: Celine Dion was reported by Amazon Prime Video to be the platform's number-one movie worldwide shortly after release. According to Luminate, the film was the most-watched movie on Prime Video from 21 to 27 June 2024, accumulating 82.8 million minutes viewed during its first three days. Viewership increased by 83% the following week, reaching 151.2 million minutes.

Luminate later reported that the film was the second most-watched music documentary of 2024 across major streaming platforms, with 507.1 million minutes viewed, behind The Greatest Night in Pop. In July 2024, Deadline Hollywood reported that the documentary had become Prime Video's most-watched documentary to date.

== Music ==
The I Am: Celine Dion soundtrack was released on 21 June 2024. The album includes 13 songs from Dion's catalogue alongside seven original score tracks composed primarily by Redi Hasa and produced by Alberto Fabris.

=== Songs used in the film in chronological order ===
All songs performed by Celine Dion, except where noted.

1. "L'amour est un oiseau rebelle" – Maria Callas
2. "River Deep, Mountain High"
3. "A New Day Has Come"
4. "Because You Loved Me"
5. "Pour que tu m'aimes encore"
6. "The Power of Love"
7. "My Heart Will Go On"
8. "Chattanooga Choo Choo"
9. "Le ballet"
10. "Hush, Little Baby" / "Chandelier"
11. "Treat Her Like a Lady"
12. "Tellement j'ai d'amour pour toi"
13. "Visa pour les beaux jours"
14. "If That's What It Takes"
15. "Ashes"
16. "That's the Way It Is"
17. "All by Myself"
18. "Ebben? Ne andrò lontana" – Maria Callas
19. "I've Got the Music in Me"
20. "Moonlight Sonata"
21. "Zora sourit"
22. "Je crois toi"
23. "Help!" – John Farnham
24. "You're the Voice" – Celine Dion and John Farnham
25. "I'm Alive"
26. "Love Again"
27. "Valse adieu"
28. "Who I Am" – Wyn Starks

== Personnel ==
- Irene Taylor – director, producer, additional editing, production sound
- Dave Platel – executive producer
- Denis Savage – executive producer
- Shane Carter – executive producer
- Krista Wegener – executive producer
- Richard Comeau – editor
- J. Christian Jensen – editor
- Redi Hasa – original music composer, score performer, cello
- Nick Midwig – director of photography
- Stacy Lorts – producer
- Tom Mackay – producer
- Julie Begey Seureau – producer
- Sydney Rafter – associate producer
- Ilana Sol – archival producer
- Alberto Fabris – score producer, score performer, synth bass
- Ekland Hasa – original music composer, score performer, piano
- Vito de Lorenzi – score performer, duff, percussion
- Federico Mecozzi – score performer, violin, viola
- Cristan Musio – score performer, viola
- Rocco Nigro – score performer, vibraphone, synth bass, accordion, xylophone
- Marco Puzello – score performer, trumpet, flugelhorn
- Lora Hirschberg – sound editing, mixing
- Madi Emenheiser – lead assistant
- Mathieu Bérubé – assistant editor
- M. Spencer Reed – assistant editor
- Laura Roe – assistant editor
- Snow Dowd – title design
- Brian Kinkley – motion graphics
- Sydney Rafter – post-production coordinator
- Chris Ward – production assistant
- Megan Neil – production assistant
- Eduardo Bejarano – production sound
- Miguel Gomez – production sound
- Treehouse Project – captioning and audio description advisor
- Kalen Feeney – captioning and audio description advisor

== Accolades ==
| Award | Date | Category | Recipient(s) | Result | Ref. |
|---|---|---|---|---|---|
| AARP Movies for Grownups Awards | 11 January 2025 | Best Documentary | I Am: Celine Dion | Nominated | |
| Critics' Choice Documentary Awards | 10 November 2024 | Best Biographical Documentary | I Am: Celine Dion | Nominated | |
| Critics' Choice Documentary Awards | 10 November 2024 | Best Music Documentary | I Am: Celine Dion | Nominated | |
| Hollywood Music in Media Awards | 20 November 2024 | Music Documentary – Special Program | I Am: Celine Dion | Nominated | |
| iHeartRadio Music Awards | 17 March 2025 | Favorite On Screen | I Am: Celine Dion | Nominated | |
| Primetime Emmy Awards | 7 September 2025 | Exceptional Merit in Documentary Filmmaking | I Am: Celine Dion | Nominated | |
