= I Am: Celine Dion (soundtrack) =

I Am: Celine Dion (Original Motion Picture Soundtrack)

Soundtrack album by Celine Dion
- Released: 21 June 2024
- Recorded: 1993–2024
- Genre: Pop
- Length: 76:16
- Languages: English; French
- Label: Columbia
- Producers: Walter Afanasieff; Erick Benzi; Alberto Fabris; David Foster; Jean-Jacques Goldman; Kristian Lundin; Steve Mac; Aldo Nova; Jim Steinman; Ric Wake; Dan Wilson

Celine Dion chronology
Love Again (2023)	I Am: Celine Dion (Original Motion Picture Soundtrack) (2024)

I Am: Celine Dion is the soundtrack album to the 2024 documentary film I Am: Celine Dion, directed by Irene Taylor, which focuses on Canadian singer Celine Dion. It was released by Columbia Records on 21 June 2024. The album contains 13 of Dion's well‑known songs, along with seven original score tracks composed mainly by Redi Hasa and produced by Alberto Fabris. In Francophone markets, it was issued under the title Je suis: Céline Dion. The album topped the chart in Quebec for three weeks and reached the top 10 on compilation charts in the United Kingdom and Ireland.

== Development ==
Sony Music announced in September 2021 that a Celine Dion feature-length documentary film was in development. The official title, I Am: Celine Dion, was revealed in January 2024, with Amazon MGM Studios acquiring the distribution rights. The film was directed by Emmy-winning and Academy Award-nominated filmmaker Irene Taylor and focuses on Dion. It explores her life, career, and her experience living with stiff-person syndrome. I Am: Celine Dion became available for streaming on Amazon Prime Video starting 25 June 2024.

== Songs ==
The soundtrack contains 20 tracks: 13 of Dion's well‑known songs and seven original score pieces mainly composed by Albanian cellist and composer Redi Hasa and produced by Italian bassist and producer Alberto Fabris. The score cue "The Diagnosis" was composed by pianist Ekland Hasa. The English‑language songs include "My Heart Will Go On", "Because You Loved Me", "The Power of Love", "All by Myself", "I'm Alive", "A New Day Has Come", and "River Deep, Mountain High". "Ashes" from the Deadpool 2 soundtrack (2018) and "Love Again" from the Love Again soundtrack (2023) are also included. The French‑language songs are "Pour que tu m'aimes encore", "Zora sourit", "J'irai où tu iras", and "Je crois toi".

== Release ==
I Am: Celine Dion was released by Columbia Records on 21 June 2024 for digital download, streaming, and on CD. It was also issued on vinyl on 9 August 2024. In Francophone countries, the album was released under the title Je suis: Céline Dion.

== Critical reception ==
According to Entertainment Focus, the score tracks are "pleasant enough", creating emotive moods and providing thoughtful pauses within the album. The review stated that the collection of hits highlights Dion's vocal ability and serves as a reminder of her impact as a performer. Entertainment Focus also noted that one of the most poignant moments comes with "I'm Alive", which has recently gained renewed attention due to a dance remix by Majestic and The Jammin Kid (retitled "Set My Heart on Fire"). The publication concluded that, given Dion's recent health challenges, "I'm Alive" carries a new emotional resonance and can be interpreted as an anthem of resilience.

== Commercial performance ==
I Am: Celine Dion debuted at number one in Quebec, and at number 68 on the Canadian Albums Chart. It spent its first three weeks at the top of the chart in Quebec. In the United States, it reached number 15 on Billboard's Top Soundtracks chart. In the United Kingdom, I Am: Celine Dion entered the UK Compilation Chart at number two. It also debuted at number eight on the UK Downloads Chart. The album was certified gold by the BPI. Elsewhere in Europe, I Am: Celine Dion reached the top 40 in several countries: number three on the Irish Compilation Albums Chart, number 17 on Switzerland's Romandy chart, number 20 in Belgium's Wallonia, and number 25 in France where it was certified gold.

== Track listing ==
All songs are performed by Celine Dion, except the original film score compositions.

No.	Title	Writer(s)	Producer(s)	Length
1.	"Main Theme – Artist Always" (score)	Redi Hasa	Alberto Fabris	4:03
2.	"The Power of Love"	Gunther Mende; Candy DeRouge; Jennifer Rush; Mary Susan Applegate	David Foster	5:44
3.	"Pour que tu m'aimes encore"	Jean-Jacques Goldman	Goldman; Erick Benzi	4:17
4.	"A New Day Has Come" (Christian B mix)	Aldo Nova; Stephan Moccio	Ric Wake; Walter Afanasieff; Nova; Richie Jones^{[a]}; S.A.F.^{[a]}	3:58
5.	"The Episode" (score)	R. Hasa	Fabris	3:59
6.	"J'irai où tu iras" (with Jean-Jacques Goldman)	Goldman	Goldman; Benzi	3:26
7.	"Because You Loved Me"	Diane Warren	Foster	4:35
8.	"The Diagnosis" (score)	Ekland Hasa	Fabris	1:14
9.	"River Deep, Mountain High"	Ellie Greenwich; Jeff Barry; Phil Spector	Jim Steinman; Steven Rinkoff^{[b]}	4:11
10.	"Mama Dion" (score)	R. Hasa	Fabris	3:28
11.	"Zora sourit"	Goldman; J. Kapler	Goldman; Benzi	3:56
12.	"My Heart Will Go On"	James Horner; Will Jennings	Afanasieff; Horner^{[b]}	4:43
13.	"All by Myself"	Eric Carmen; Sergei Rachmaninoff	Foster	5:10
14.	"The Awakening" (score)	R. Hasa	Fabris	3:19
15.	"Ashes"	Petey Martin; Jordan Smith; Tedd T.	Steve Mac	3:18
16.	"Swallows" (score)	R. Hasa	Fabris	2:50
17.	"Love Again"	Dan Wilson; Rosaileen Scher	Wilson; Sara Mulford^{[a]}	3:32
18.	"Je crois toi"	Goldman	Goldman; Benzi	5:07
19.	"I'm Alive"	Kristian Lundin; Andreas Carlsson	Lundin; Wake^{[a]}; Jones^{[a]}	3:30
20.	"Talea" (score)	R. Hasa	Fabris	1:56
Total length:				76:16

=== Notes ===
- ^{^a} signifies an additional producer
- ^{^b} signifies a co-producer

== Film score personnel ==
- Redi Hasa – composer, cello
- Ekland Hasa – composer, piano
- Alberto Fabris – producer, synth bass
- Cristan Musio – viola
- Rocco Nigro – vibraphone, synth bass, accordion, xylophone, engineer, editor
- Vito de Lorenzi – daf, percussion
- Federico Mecozzi – violin, viola
- Marco Puzello – trumpet, flugelhorn
- Tim Oliver – engineer, mixing
- Valerio Daniele – engineer
- Stefano Manca – editor

== Charts ==
=== Weekly charts ===
Weekly chart performance
Chart (2024)	Peak position
Belgian Albums (Ultratop Flanders)	52
Belgian Albums (Ultratop Wallonia)	20
Canadian Albums (Billboard)	68
French Albums (SNEP)	25
Irish Compilation Albums (OCC)	3
Japanese Albums (Oricon)	43
Japanese Hot Albums (Billboard Japan)	44
Polish Physical Albums (ZPAV)	75
Portuguese Albums (AFP)	169
Quebec Albums (ADISQ)	1
Swiss Albums (Schweizer Hitparade)	81
Swiss Romandy Albums (Schweizer Hitparade)	17
UK Compilation Albums (Official Charts)	2
UK Album Downloads (Official Charts)	8
US Soundtrack Albums (Billboard)	15

=== Year-end charts ===
Year-end chart performance
Chart (2024)	Position
French Albums (SNEP)	197

== Certifications ==
Certifications
Region	Certification	Certified units/sales
France (SNEP)	Gold	50,000^{‡}
United Kingdom (BPI)	Gold	100,000^{‡}
^{‡} Sales+streaming figures based on certification alone.

== Release history ==
Release history
Region	Date	Format	Label	Ref.
Various	21 June 2024	CD; digital download; streaming	Columbia	
Various	9 August 2024	Vinyl LP	Columbia	
Japan	14 August 2024	Blu-spec CD2	SMEJ	
