= Alice Eve =

British actress (born 1982)

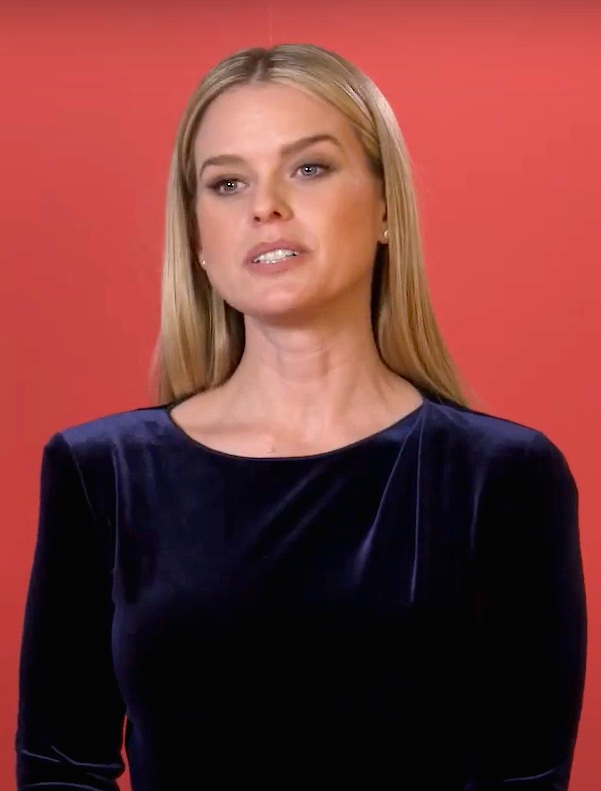
- Eve in 2021
- Born: Alice Sophia Eve; 6 February 1982 (age 44); London, England
- Citizenship: United Kingdom; United States (from 2017)
- Education: St Catherine's College, Oxford (BA)
- Occupation: Actress
- Years active: 2004–present
- Spouse: Alex Cowper-Smith (m. 2014; div. 2017)
- Partner: Adam O'Riordan (2009–2012)
- Parents: Trevor Eve; Sharon Maughan

Alice Sophia Eve (born 6 February 1982) is a British-American actress. The daughter of actors Trevor Eve and Sharon Maughan, she began her career with supporting roles in the films Hawking and Stage Beauty (both 2004). Her other credits include Starter for 10 (2006), She's Out of My League (2010), Men in Black 3 (2012), Star Trek Into Darkness (2013), Before We Go (2014), Please Stand By (2017), Replicas (2018), and Bombshell (2019). On television, she has had recurring roles on HBO's Entourage (2011), Marvel's Iron Fist (2018), and Amazon Prime's The Power (2023).

== Early life ==
Eve was born on 6 February 1982 in London, the daughter of actors Trevor Eve and Sharon Maughan. She has two brothers. She went to Bedales School and More House School, then took her A-levels at Westminster School in London.

During her gap year, she studied at the Beverly Hills Playhouse and then read English at St Catherine's College, Oxford. At Oxford, she appeared in student productions of The Importance of Being Earnest, Animal Crackers (which toured to the Edinburgh Festival Fringe) and Scenes from an Execution.

== Acting career ==
Eve has appeared in television dramas such as the BBC's The Rotters' Club, Agatha Christie's Poirot and Hawking and starred in the drama film Stage Beauty (2004).

In 2006, she starred in two comedy films: Starter for 10 and Big Nothing (in which she and co-star Simon Pegg put on American accents). She spent the early part of 2006 in India working on the drama miniseries Losing Gemma about backpackers.

On the stage, Eve has appeared in two plays directed by Trevor Nunn. In 2006, she played young Esme/Alice in the then-new Tom Stoppard play Rock 'n' Roll, at the Royal Court Theatre, later reprising her role for the 2007 Broadway transfer. For this performance, she was nominated for the best supporting actress award at the Whatsonstage.com Theatregoers' Choice Awards.

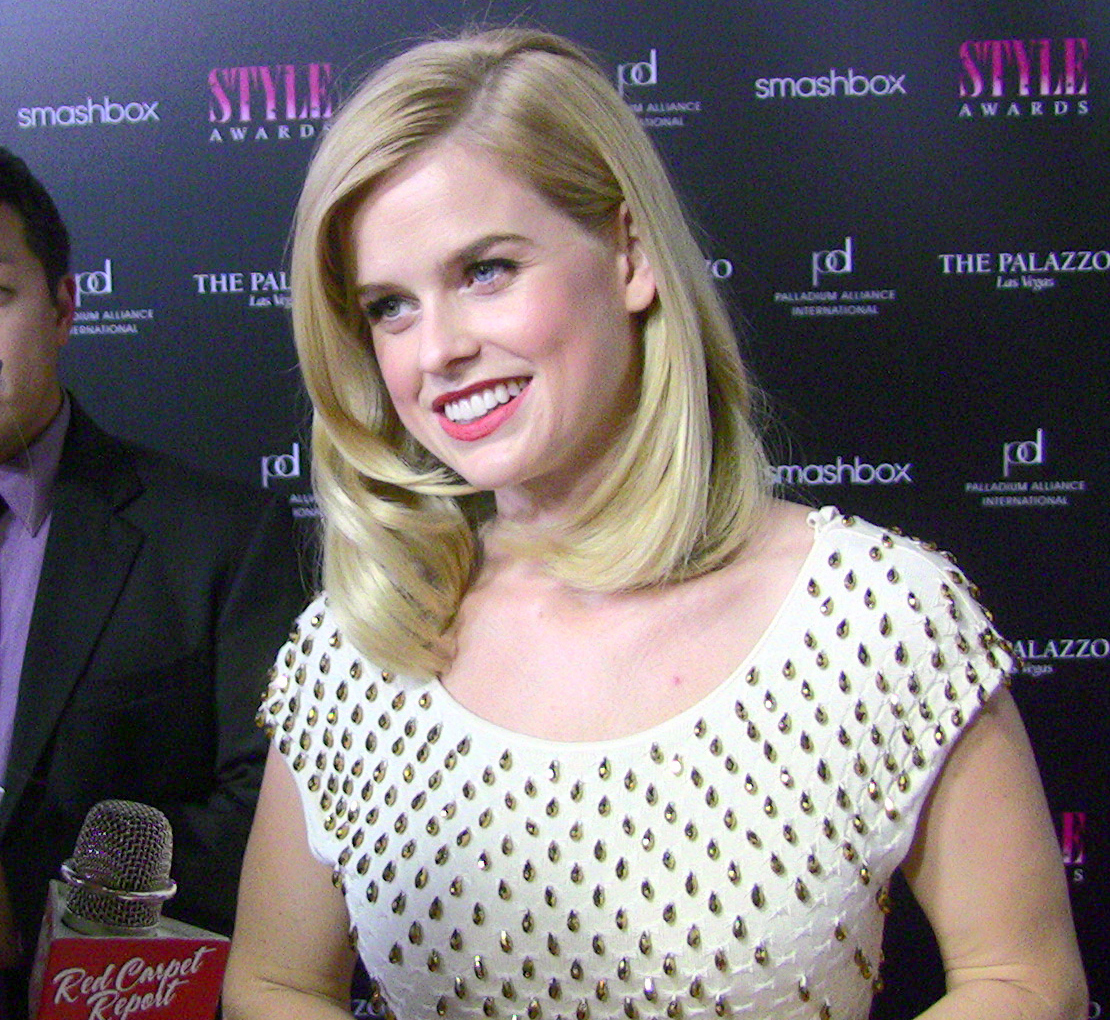
Alice Eve at the 2011 Hollywood Style Awards

In 2009, she played Roxane in a production of Cyrano de Bergerac at the Chichester Festival Theatre.

In 2010, Eve played the female lead role in the romantic comedy She's Out of My League, in which her parents play the roles of her character's parents. She also played the role of Erin, Charlotte York's Irish nanny, in Sex and the City 2.

During 2011, Eve had a recurring guest role in season 8 of the HBO series Entourage, as Sophia, a journalist and love interest to Vincent Chase. In 2011, Eve also portrayed Hollywood actress Lara Tyler in the romantic comedy The Decoy Bride.

In 2012, she played the younger 1969 version of Agent O in the sci-fi comedy Men in Black 3, the older version being played by Emma Thompson.

Eve took part in the opening session of the 2013 Consumer Electronics Show. She appeared in Paul McCartney's music video "Queenie Eye" (2013), and in Rixton's music video "Hotel Ceiling" (2015).

In 2013, she co-starred in the romantic drama Before We Go with Chris Evans, who also directed the film. Also in 2013, she portrayed Dr. Carol Marcus in Star Trek Into Darkness, the second film in the JJ Abrams reboot of the franchise. She played herself in the Hollywood film Night at the Museum: Secret of the Tomb (2014) and has since starred in several productions, including the action thriller Criminal (2016).

In 2016, she appeared in "Nosedive", an episode of the anthology series Black Mirror. In December 2017, Eve joined the Marvel Cinematic Universe television series Iron Fist as Mary Walker.

== Personal life ==
Until 2012, Eve was in a long-term relationship with poet Adam O'Riordan, whom she met while reading English at the University of Oxford. On 14 August 2014, she announced her engagement to her "high school sweetheart", financier Alex Cowper-Smith, whom she met while attending Westminster School in London. They married on 31 December 2014 and divorced in 2017. Eve was then in a relationship with producer and aristocrat Peter Czernin from 2021 until 2023.

Eve has heterochromia, a condition that causes her eyes to have irises of different colours. Her left eye is blue and her right eye is green.

She lives in London and Los Angeles. She became a naturalized American citizen in November 2017.

== Filmography ==
=== Film ===
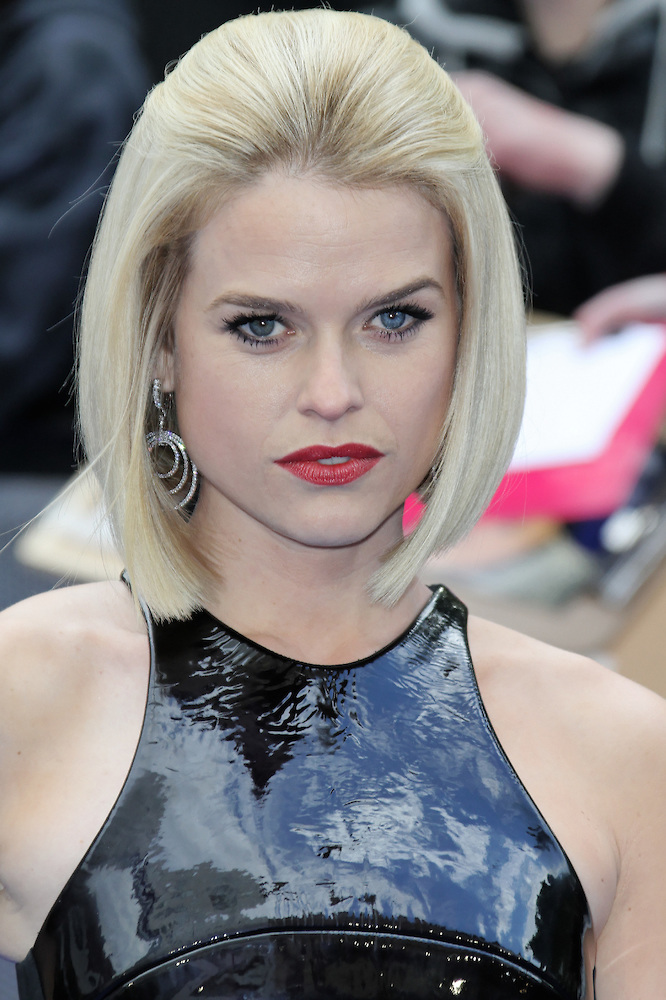
Alice Eve at the Men in Black 3 premiere in 2012

Key
| † | Denotes films that have not yet been released |

| Year | Title | Role | Notes |
|---|---|---|---|
| 2004 | Stage Beauty | Miss Frayne | |
| 2006 | Starter for 10 | Alice Harbinson | |
| 2006 | Big Nothing | Josie | |
| 2007 | The Amazing Trousers | Colette | Short film |
| 2009 | Crossing Over | Claire Sheperd | |
| 2010 | She's Out of My League | Molly McCleish | |
| 2010 | Sex and the City 2 | Erin | |
| 2011 | The Decoy Bride | Lara Tyler | |
| 2012 | ATM | Emily Brandt | |
| 2012 | The Raven | Emily Hamilton | |
| 2012 | Men in Black 3 | Young Agent O | |
| 2012 | Please, Alfonso | Annabelle | Short film |
| 2012 | Decoding Annie Parker | Louise | |
| 2013 | Some Velvet Morning | Velvet | |
| 2013 | Star Trek Into Darkness | Dr. Carol Marcus | |
| 2013 | Cold Comes the Night | Chloe | |
| 2014 | Night at the Museum: Secret of the Tomb | Guinevere / Herself | Uncredited |
| 2014 | Before We Go | Brooke Dalton | |
| 2014 | Death of a Farmer | —N/a | Producer |
| 2015 | Dirty Weekend | Natalie Hamilton | |
| 2015 | Lithgow Saint | Amelia Adams | Short film |
| 2016 | Criminal | Marta Lynch | |
| 2016 | Misconduct | Charlotte | |
| 2017 | Bees Make Honey | Honey | |
| 2017 | Please Stand By | Audrey | |
| 2017 | The Stolen | Charlotte Lockton | |
| 2018 | Untogether | Irene | |
| 2018 | The Con Is On | Jackie | |
| 2018 | Replicas | Mona Foster | |
| 2019 | Bombshell | Ainsley Earhardt | |
| 2021 | Warning | Claire | |
| 2022 | The Infernal Machine | Officer Laura Higgins | |
| 2023 | Haunting of the Queen Mary | Anne Caulder | |
| 2023 | Freelance | Jenny Pettits | |
| 2024 | Cult Killer | Cassie Holt | |
| 2024 | Take Cover | Tamara | |
| 2025 | Tinsel Town | Grace | |
| 2026 | Chum | Tina | |
| 2026 | Fortitude † | Nancy Armstrong | Post-production |
| TBA | The Awakening † | Rebecca | Post-production; also executive producer |

=== Television ===
| Year | Title | Role | Notes |
|---|---|---|---|
| 2004 | Hawking | Martha Guthrie | Television film |
| 2005 | The Rotters' Club | Cicely Boyd | Miniseries |
| 2005 | Beethoven | Countess Giulietta Guicciardi | Episode: "The Rebel" |
| 2005 | Agatha Christie's Poirot | Lenox Tamplin | Episode: "The Mystery of the Blue Train" |
| 2006 | Losing Gemma | Esther | Television film |
| 2011 | Entourage | Sophia | 4 episodes |
| 2016 | Black Mirror | Naomi Jayne Blestow | Episode: "Nosedive" |
| 2018 | Ordeal by Innocence | Gwenda Vaughan | Miniseries |
| 2018 | Robot Chicken | Jane Porter / Alexis | Voice; episode: "Jew No. 1 Opens a Treasure Chest" |
| 2018 | Iron Fist | Mary Walker | Season 2 regular; 10 episodes |
| 2020 | Belgravia | Susan Trenchard | 6 episodes |
| 2023 | The Power | Kristen | Recurring role |
| 2023 | The Lovers | Frankie | Recurring role |
| 2024 | Belgravia: The Next Chapter | Susan Trenchard | 3 episodes |

=== Music videos ===
| Year | Title | Artist |
|---|---|---|
| 2013 | "Queenie Eye" | Paul McCartney |
| 2015 | "Hotel Ceiling" | Rixton |
