= I'll Be (Celine Dion song) =

Promotional single by Celine Dion

from the album Love Again
- Released: 5 May 2023
- Studio: At the Palms (Las Vegas); Enemy Dojo (Calabasas); Juicy Hill (Harbour Island); MixStar (Virginia Beach)
- Genre: Pop
- Length: 3:03
- Label: Columbia
- Songwriters: John Ryan; Ross Golan; Jacob Kasher Hindlin; Ian Kirkpatrick
- Producers: Afterhrs; J Kash

Lyric video
- "I'll Be" on YouTube

"I'll Be" is a song by Canadian singer Celine Dion from the soundtrack album Love Again (2023). Written by John Ryan, Ross Golan, Jacob Kasher Hindlin, and Ian Kirkpatrick, the track was produced by the American production duo Afterhrs under the direction of J Kash. Released as a promotional single on 5 May 2023, the upbeat song received positive reviews from music critics and entered the sales charts, reaching number two in Quebec and number 25 in Canada.

== Background and release ==
After releasing Courage in 2019 and beginning the Courage World Tour, Dion joined the cast of the American romantic comedy-drama film Love Again, directed by James C. Strouse. Filming began in October 2020 and concluded in early 2021.

Dion recorded five new songs for the film, including "Love Again", released on 13 April 2023 as her first new music in four years and her first since revealing in December 2022 that she had been diagnosed with stiff-person syndrome. "I'll Be" was released on 5 May 2023. It was written by John Ryan, Ross Golan, Jacob Kasher Hindlin, and Ian Kirkpatrick, and produced by Afterhrs (Andrew Haas and Ian Franzino) under the direction of J Kash. In 2019, Golan also co-wrote "Lovers Never Die" for Dion's previous album, Courage. The Love Again soundtrack, which includes 11 songs by Dion, was released on 12 May 2023.

== Critical reception ==
Larisha Paul of Rolling Stone gave the song a positive review, describing it as "an alternate universe version of My Heart Will Go On". She wrote that the chorus of "I'll Be", which promises "No, you won't be alone through the highs and the lows/You know you got me/Wherever you go", recalls the sentiment of "Near, far, wherever you are/I believe that the heart does go on", imagining an alternate storyline in which Titanic follows a woman grieving her fiancé and a journalist profiling Celine Dion rather than two lovers aboard a sinking ship.

== Commercial performance ==
"I'll Be" debuted and peaked at number two on the Quebec Song Sales chart. In its second week, it fell to number three. It also reached number 25 on the Canadian Digital Song Sales chart in its first week. The following week, it dropped to number 43.

== Music video ==
The lyric video, which includes clips from the film alongside photos and messages from fans, was released on YouTube on 5 May 2023.

== Credits and personnel ==
=== Recording ===
- Recorded at Studio at the Palms (Las Vegas), Enemy Dojo (Calabasas) and Juicy Hill (Harbour Island)
- Mixed at MixStar Studios (Virginia Beach)

=== Personnel ===
- Celine Dion – lead vocals
- John Ryan – composer, lyricist
- Ross Golan – composer, lyricist
- Jacob Kasher Hindlin – composer, lyricist
- Ian Kirkpatrick – composer, lyricist
- Afterhrs – producer
- J Kash – producer
- Serban Ghenea – mixing engineer
- Bryce Bordone – assistant mix engineer
- Francois Lalonde – engineer for lead vocals
- Rob Katz – assistant engineer for lead vocals

== Charts ==
Chart performance
Chart (2023)	Peak position
Canada Digital Song Sales (Billboard)	25
Quebec Digital Song Sales (ADISQ)	2

== Release history ==
Release history
Region	Date	Format	Label	Ref.
Various	5 May 2023	Digital download; streaming	Columbia	
Italy	26 May 2023	Contemporary hit radio	Columbia	
