= Paul Taylor (engineer) =

American engineer (1939–2021)

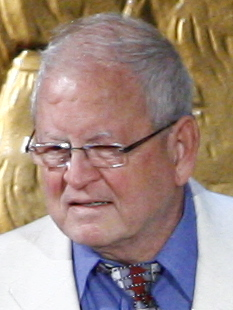
- Taylor in 2009
- Born: November 15, 1939; Alabama, U.S.
- Died: January 11, 2021 (aged 81); Portland, Oregon, U.S.
- Education: Georgia Institute of Technology (Bachelor's degree); Washington University in St. Louis (Master's degree)
- Relatives: Irene Taylor Brodsky (daughter)

Paul Taylor (15 November 1939 – 11 January 2021) was an American engineer, a pioneer in development of telecommunications devices for the deaf (also known as TTYs). He also enjoyed a kind of celebrity status because of his central role in the award-winning documentary Hear and Now. The film by daughter Irene Taylor Brodsky chronicles the before and after experiences of her parents, Paul and Sally Taylor, both of whom underwent cochlear implant surgeries in their mid-60s after a lifetime of deafness.

== Education ==
Taylor earned a bachelor's degree in chemical engineering at Georgia Institute of Technology in 1962. He was awarded a master's degree in operational research from Washington University in St. Louis.

== Career ==
Taylor worked for 12 years in various engineering positions with McDonnell Douglas and Monsanto in St. Louis, Missouri. During the late 1960s, he combined Western Union teletypewriters with modems to create the first telecommunications devices for the deaf, known as TDDs or TTYs (teletypewriter). He distributed these early, non-portable devices to the homes of many in the Deaf community in St. Louis. He worked with others to establish a local telephone wake-up service. In the early 1970s, he created the nation's first local telephone relay system for the deaf.

In 1975, Taylor was named chair of the Engineering Support Team at the National Technical Institute for the Deaf (NTID) at the Rochester Institute of Technology (RIT) in Rochester, New York. He would remain at NTID/RIT for the next 30 years. When he retired, he had become a professor of computer technology.

In the late 1970s and early 1980s, he worked with others in New York to create one of the nation's first statewide relay services. This service was funded by long-distance telephone companies.

Taylor helped write regulations for the Federal Communications Commission (FCC) in the process of implementing statewide telephone relay systems which were required by the Americans with Disabilities Act of 1990 (ADA).

== Hear and Now ==
In 2007, Paul and Sally Taylor were the subjects of an award-winning documentary film, Hear and Now. When the deaf couple were in their mid-60s, they decided to undergo cochlear implant surgery which could enable each to hear sounds for the first time; and their filmmaker daughter, Irene Taylor Brodsky, chronicled their experiences. Hear and Now was recognized with awards at the Heartland and Sundance Film Festivals in 2007; and the work was honored with a Peabody Award in 2008.

Writing in Variety, Peter Deburge assessed the film as "more "Oprah" than "Frontline," which suggests that those who see the film learn about a man and a father and a husband who also happens to have done something noteworthy in his working career as an engineer.

== See also ==
- List of Peabody Award winners (2000-2009)
