= Wait on Me =

2014 single by Rixton

Single by Rixton

from the album Let the Road
- Released: 23 July 2014
- Recorded: 2014
- Genre: Pop rock; reggae fusion
- Length: 3:57
- Label: School Boy; Giant Little Man; Mad Love; Interscope
- Songwriters: Benjamin Levin; Mikkel S. Eriksen; Tor Erik Hermansen; Jennifer Decilveo; Wayne Hector; Ross Golan; Dan Omelio
- Producers: Benny Blanco; Stargate

Rixton singles chronology
"Me and My Broken Heart" (2014)	"Wait on Me" (2014)	"Hotel Ceiling" (2015)

"Wait on Me" is a song performed by English pop band Rixton. It was released on 23 July 2014 as the second single from their debut album, Let the Road (2015). The song was written by Benny Blanco, Stargate, Wayne Hector, Ross Golan, Jennifer Decilveo, and Robopop, and it was produced by Blanco and Stargate.

== Music video ==
A lyric video for the song was released on 22 September with footage of Rixton's Me and My Broken Heart Tour on the US. The official music video was released on 9 October, the plot of the video shows two endings.

== Critical reception ==
Sylvie Lesas of Evigshed Magazine gave the song four and a half stars out of five, saying: "[The song] is an infectious blend of pop-rock, reggae influences into a danceable anthem. It reminds you a little bit of Maroon 5. The song is a huge summer jam, both haunting and sweet, to make you dance all night on the beach…"

== Live performances ==
Rixton performed "Wait on Me" in the show Late Night with Seth Meyers on 5 August. The song was also performed with "Me and My Broken Heart" on the Teen Choice Awards on 10 August.

== Track listing ==
Digital download
No.	Title	Length
1.	"Wait on Me"	3:57

== Charts ==
Chart (2014)	Peak position
Ireland (IRMA)	62
Scottish Singles Sales (Official Charts)	11
UK Singles (Official Charts)	12
US Pop Airplay (Billboard)	33

== Release history ==
Region	Date	Format(s)	Label(s)
United States	23 July 2014	Digital download; streaming	School Boy; Giant Little Man; Mad Love; Geffen; Interscope
