= Hotel Ceiling =

2015 single by Rixton

Single by Rixton

from the album Let the Road
- Released: 21 January 2015
- Recorded: 2014
- Genre: Pop
- Length: 3:11
- Label: School Boy; Interscope
- Songwriters: Benny Blanco; Ed Sheeran
- Producer: Levin

Rixton singles chronology
"Wait on Me" (2014)	"Hotel Ceiling" (2015)	"We All Want the Same Thing" (2015)

Music video
- "Hotel Ceiling" on YouTube

"Hotel Ceiling" is a song performed by English pop band Push Baby (then known as Rixton), issued as the third single from their debut studio album Let the Road. The song was written by Ed Sheeran and Benny Blanco.

== Music video ==
The official music video for the song was filmed in London and directed by Clarence Fuller. It features a couple (Alice Eve, Billy Huxley) who initially appear happy, but the relationship becomes violent throughout the course of the video. Eventually the man becomes a missing person; and the video then displays scenes of the woman's distress interspersed with flashback scenes of the couple during happier times. The video ends with the woman calmly waiting for the police after having murdered the man.

None of the members of Rixton appear in the video.

=== Critical reception ===
Although the song received positive reviews, the music video received middling reviews. Marian Wyman of The Heights noted that the ending was "subtly creepy"; while Maggie Malach of PopCrush suggested that audiences wouldn't be prepared for the video's content. Dusty Baxter-Wright of Sugarscape.com called the video "disturbing". Rixton lead singer Jake Roche called the video "very depressing" himself, a sentiment that MTV's Christina Garibaldi called "an understatement"; although she also suggested that viewers would still want to re-watch it.
