= Me and My Broken Heart =

Single by Rixton

from the album Let the Road
- Released: 15 March 2014
- Recorded: 2013
- Genre: Pop
- Length: 3:13
- Label: Schoolboy; Giant Little Man; Mad Love; Interscope
- Songwriters: Benjamin Levin; Ammar Malik; Steve Mac; Wayne Hector; Rob Thomas
- Producers: Benny Blanco; Steve Mac

Rixton singles chronology
"Me and My Broken Heart" (2014)	"Wait on Me" (2014)

"Me and My Broken Heart" is the debut single by English pop band Rixton (later known as Push Baby). Written by Benny Blanco, Ammar Malik, Steve Mac, Wayne Hector, and Rob Thomas, and produced by Blanco and Mac, the song was first released on 15 March 2014 as the lead single from Rixton's debut studio album, Let the Road (2015).

== Background and composition ==
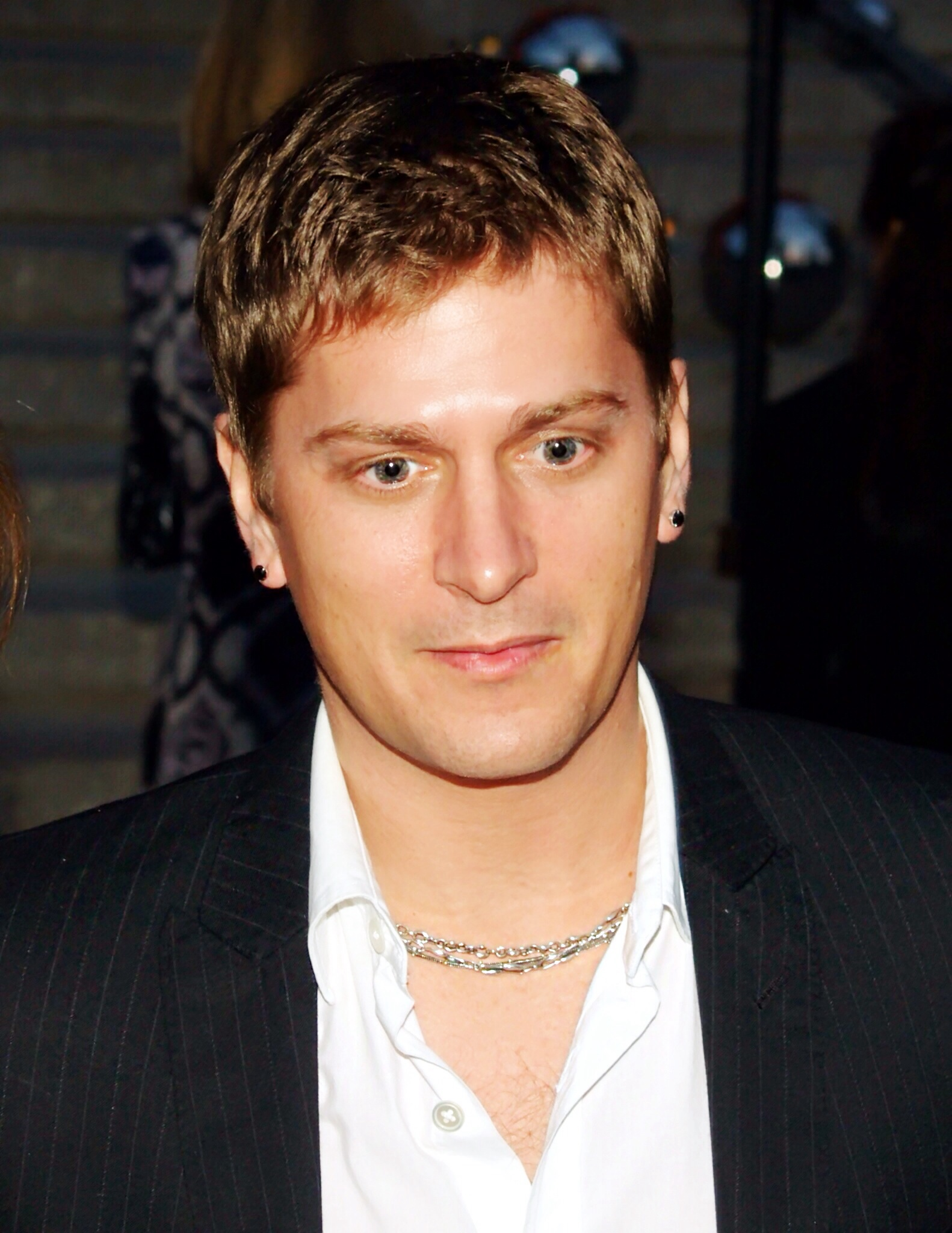
"Me and My Broken Heart" interpolates the chorus of Rob Thomas' 2005 single, "Lonely No More".

Band members Jake Roche and Danny Wilkin wrote songs in a caravan belonging to Wilkin's parents, three years prior to the formation of their band. After being introduced to Charley Bagnall through mutual friends, the trio met Lewi Morgan who subsequently joined them to form the band, Rixton. After establishing a loyal following on YouTube for their covers of hit singles by Taylor Swift, Chris Brown and Rita Ora among others, the group was signed to Interscope Records and three of its sub labels by talent manager Scooter Braun and songwriter/record producer, Benny Blanco. When speaking about their signing to the label(s) and the experience of recording their first extended play, Rixton commented, "It's overwhelming to have gone from writing songs in Wilkin's caravan to seeing the world performing our music. We've worked extremely hard and have had a blast recording the EP. The songs are very eclectic and we think there's something for everyone!".

"Me and My Broken Heart" is a pop song that interpolates parts of Rob Thomas's 2005 single "Lonely No More". Band member Jake Roche discussed the sample in an article for Billboard: "We've been a huge fan of his, so we took a lot of inspiration from him and wanted to give him a tip of the hat". While Thomas has responded positively to the use of the sample, "Me and My Broken Heart" has been criticised online for using elements of Thomas' song.

After working with Blanco in the recording studio, "Me and My Broken Heart" was released as the lead single from the group's forthcoming debut studio album on 14 March 2014. The group's first extended play, titled Me and My Broken Heart EP followed on 18 March 2014. "Me and My Broken Heart" was released to radio on 11 March 2014 and made its premiere on KIIS FM in Los Angeles during one of JoJo Wright's shows.

== Chart performance ==
"Me and My Broken Heart" has performed moderately well worldwide, reaching the top forty on the majority of charts it has entered. During the week of its release in the United Kingdom, "Me and My Broken Heart" led the mid-week chart, outselling its closest rival, "Your Love" by Nicole Scherzinger, by 12,000 copies. It subsequently debuted at number-one on the UK Singles Chart, becoming the group's first number-one hit. In the United States, "Me and My Broken Heart" debuted at number eighty-seven on the US Billboard Hot 100 and eventually peaked at number fourteen, giving Rixton their only Hot 100 entry in the US. It has sold more than 1,000,000 copies since its release and has therefore gained a platinum certification by the Recording Industry Association of America (RIAA). The song has also enjoyed success on other Billboard charts, reaching the top five of the Adult Top 40, the top ten of the Mainstream Top 40 and the top twenty of the Adult Contemporary chart.

== Music video ==
The song's accompanying music video, which runs for three minutes and sixteen seconds, was directed by Cameron Duddy, who is known for his work with Bruno Mars and OneRepublic. It was filmed in Los Angeles, with scenes at Azteca Boxing Club in Bell, California, and Malibu Pier in Malibu, California. The video was released on 27 March 2014 via the group's Vevo account on YouTube and shows Rixton (known as Chumps) playing a poker game with female con artists in a boxing club for a prize of $10,000 just before the police storm the club to arrest the con artists. Initially, they appear to be conned as the con artists switched the money prize bag for a fake one filled with papers; but Roche, suspecting that something is up from the start, was able to snatch the real money bag from the con artists.

According to Christina Garibaldi, "[Rixton] takes fans on a wild ride filled with a sneaky con artist and a shady poker match, all while teaching a valuable lesson: Don't ever trust someone you just met with a bag full of $10,000 in cash." The band told MTV News, "This girl kind of sets us up, and we invest our own money in a poker game, and we get set up, ripped off. We wanted to make a Guy Ritchie-type film and get our acting heads on."

There is an extended version of the video, which lasts for six minutes and twenty-one seconds. It has dialogue lines explaining the context behind the music video narrated by Roche. The extended version retains the original music video scenes but with some minor changes and contains additional scenes that show what happens before or during the music video. It is revealed that the police have prior knowledge about the con artists thanks to the protagonists.

A lyrics video is also made that's more related to the song's title. It follows the first-person perspective of a young man who is desperately searching for a girlfriend. Some of the song's lyrics appear on certain objects that the young man holds throughout the video, such as a letter, a coffee cup, a burrito wrap, and a couple of Rixton posters. After getting rejected by four girls throughout the video, the young man goes to a bar, where he finds a fifth girl who finally accepts him. The video ends with the two flirting with each other before the screen goes black as soon as they lean in for a kiss.

== Live performances and covers ==
In April 2014, the band performed the song on the second live show of The Voice. In May 2014, the band made their television debut on a talk show with a performance of the song on The Ellen DeGeneres Show. They also performed it at the 2014 Teen Choice Awards on 10 August 2014.

== In popular culture ==
"Me and My Broken Heart" is among the forty-five tracks that appear in the rhythm-based video game, Just Dance 2015.

The song appeared at the end of The Haunted Hathaways episode "Mostly Ghostly Girl".

== Track listing ==
Digital download single
No.	Title	Writer(s)	Producer(s)	Length
1.	"Me and My Broken Heart"	Benjamin Levin; Ammar Malik; Steve Mac; Wayne Hector; Rob Thomas	Benny Blanco; Mac	3:13

Digital download EP / Physical EP
No.	Title	Writer(s)	Producer(s)	Length
1.	"We All Want the Same Thing"	Levin; Malik; Dan Omelio; Joshua Coleman; Jacob Kasher	Blanco; Robopop	3:45
2.	"Hotel Ceiling"	Levin; Ed Sheeran	Blanco	3:10
3.	"Me and My Broken Heart"	Levin; Malik; Mac; Hector; Thomas	Blanco; Mac	3:13
4.	"Appreciated"	Levin; Ross Golan	Blanco; Golan (add.)	3:53

== Charts ==
=== Weekly charts ===
Chart (2014)	Peak position
Australia (ARIA)	43
Austria (Ö3 Austria Top 40)	69
Belgium (Ultratip Bubbling Under Flanders)	81
Belgium (Ultratip Bubbling Under Wallonia)	6
Belgium Dance (Ultratop Wallonia)	8
Canada Hot 100 (Billboard)	17
Canada AC (Billboard)	3
Canada CHR/Top 40 (Billboard)	16
Canada Hot AC (Billboard)	7
Czech Republic Singles Digital (ČNS IFPI)	31
Denmark (Tracklisten)	6
Euro Digital Song Sales (Billboard)	2
Finland (Suomen virallinen lista)	13
France (SNEP)	84
Germany (GfK)	91
Ireland (IRMA)	12
Netherlands (Single Top 100)	46
Poland Airplay (ZPAV)	13
Romania (Romanian Top 100)	15
Scottish Singles Sales (Official Charts)	1
Slovakia Airplay (ČNS IFPI)	3
Slovakia Singles Digital (ČNS IFPI)	29
Slovenia (SloTop50)	35
Sweden (Sverigetopplistan)	33
Switzerland (Schweizer Hitparade)	69
UK Singles (Official Charts)	1
US Billboard Hot 100	14
US Adult Contemporary (Billboard)	4
US Adult Pop Airplay (Billboard)	5
US Pop Airplay (Billboard)	6
Venezuela Pop/Rock Songs (Record Report)	3

=== Year-end charts ===
Chart (2014)	Position
Canada (Canadian Hot 100)	68
Sweden (Sverigetopplistan)	99
UK Singles (Official Charts Company)	82
US Billboard Hot 100	70
US Adult Contemporary (Billboard)	14
US Adult Top 40 (Billboard)	27
US Mainstream Top 40 (Billboard)	32
Chart (2015)	Position
US Adult Contemporary (Billboard)	42

== Certifications ==
Region	Certification	Certified units/sales
Brazil (Pro-Música Brasil)	Platinum	60,000^{‡}
Canada (Music Canada)	Gold	40,000^{*}
Denmark (IFPI Danmark)	2× Platinum	180,000^{‡}
Germany (BVMI)	Gold	150,000^{‡}
Italy (FIMI)	Gold	25,000^{‡}
New Zealand (RMNZ)	2× Platinum	60,000^{‡}
Spain (Promusicae)	Gold	30,000^{‡}
Sweden (GLF)	Platinum	40,000^{‡}
United Kingdom (BPI)	Platinum	600,000^{‡}
United States (RIAA)	Platinum	1,000,000^{‡}
Streaming
Denmark (IFPI Danmark)	Platinum	2,600,000^{†}
^{*} Sales figures based on certification alone.^{‡} Sales+streaming figures based on certification alone.^{†} Streaming-only figures based on certification alone.

== Release history ==
Release dates and formats for "Me and My Broken Heart"
Region	Date	Format	Label(s)	Ref.
United States	11 March 2014	Mainstream airplay	Interscope	
