= Rosie (musician) =

American singer-songwriter

- Born: Rosaileen Scher; February 2, 2000 (age 26); Nyack, New York, U.S.
- Origin: Nyack, New York, U.S.
- Genres: Pop; Indie pop; Singer-songwriter; Country pop
- Occupations: Singer; songwriter
- Years active: 2019–present
- Label: Arista
- Website: rosiemusicofficial.com

Rosaileen Scher, known professionally as Rosie (stylized in all caps as ROSIE), is an American singer-songwriter. A Nyack, New York native, she came to prominence in 2020 after her breakup ballad "Never the 1" went viral on TikTok, and later co-wrote the title track of the 2023 Celine Dion film soundtrack Love Again.

Her music, which often reflects on her personal mental struggles, is noted for its straightforward presentation, devoid of extensive editing or reliance on current trends.

== Early life ==
Scher was born in 2000 in Nyack, New York. Her early interest in music was supported by her parents, who encouraged her to pursue songwriting during her teenage years. She attended Berklee College of Music but dropped out in 2020 to focus on her music career.

== Career ==
During the COVID-19 pandemic, Scher posted cover songs and performed live on Instagram; she also experimented with TikTok early in the pandemic but initially found limited success. Her career experienced a turning point in mid-2020 when her pop break-up song "Never the 1" went viral on TikTok, leading to a contract with Arista Records in the same year.

The following year, she released a seven-song EP entitled "20mg of Happiness". In 2023, she released an EP titled "5 Songs for Healing". She also co-wrote the song "Love Again" for Celine Dion, which was subsequently used in the 2023 film Love Again. The song was "so compelling" that it prompted a change in the film's title.

== Discography ==
=== Studio albums ===
- City Woman (2025)

=== Extended plays ===
- 20mg of Happiness (2021)
- 5 Songs for Healing (2023)
- What Scares Me the Most (2024)

=== Songwriting credits ===
- "Love Again" – Celine Dion (2023), co-written with Dan Wilson
