= The Final Inch =

- Publicity poster
- Directed by: Irene Taylor Brodsky
- Produced by: Irene Taylor Brodsky; Tom Grant
- Starring: Mohammad Gulzar Saifi
- Cinematography: Jeff Streich; Irene Taylor Brodsky
- Edited by: Bill Weber
- Music by: Joe Janiga; Courtney Von Drehle
- Production company: Vermilion Films
- Distributed by: Home Box Office
- Release date: April 1, 2009
- Running time: 38 minutes
- Country: United States
- Languages: English; Urdu; Hindi

The Final Inch is a short documentary about the effort to eradicate polio. It was directed by Irene Taylor Brodsky and focuses on health workers on the front lines of the fight to eliminate the disease. It was filmed on location in Afghanistan, Pakistan, and India and received a nomination for an Academy Award for Best Documentary (Short Subject) at the 81st Academy Awards.

The film debuted on HBO on April 1, 2009. The Final Inch is the first film project of Google.org, the philanthropic division of Google.

== Background ==
The Final Inch focuses on the efforts that were ongoing to eradicate polio in India, Pakistan, and Afghanistan (it has since been eradicated in India; efforts continue in Pakistan and Afghanistan). The corollary goal of worldwide eradication of polio has attracted attention, but "getting rid of the last 1 percent has been like trying to squeeze Jell-O to death."

The philanthropic division of Google backed the film's production to promote public awareness about polio and to raise awareness about the efforts of public health workers and volunteers fighting the disease in counties around the world. They approached Brodsky about making the film and she accepted the task of educating the public to the ongoing problem.

Many of the movie's scenes were shot in slum areas of India and Pakistan during "National Immunization Day" in April 2007. Brodsky wanted to include more comprehensive coverage of the polio problem in Afghanistan, but was unable to do so due to the threat of violence and because of social barriers. The production's ability to film in Afghanistan was hampered by increased danger to the film crew. Producer Tom Grant had to wear a bulletproof vest while filming along the Afghanistan–Pakistan border, even while under constant U.N. protection. The crew was often denied access to homes because of familial protocols that forbid a man entering a home with women in it when no husband is present.

== Synopsis ==
The film depicted the problems still occurring fifty years after the development of the polio vaccine, and shows areas where the polio virus was still found in several countries around the world. Without vaccinations, it could re-emerge and re-infect regions where it was eradicated decades ago, and the film also notes that the first line of defense is a dedicated and continual effort by international health workers going door-to-door to ensure every child is vaccinated.

The Final Inch shows that there was an opportunity to eradicate polio from India (the last case of wild polio in India was reported on 13 January 2011 and the WHO announced the eradication of poliomyelitis in the region on 27 March 2014) and honors the work of health services and service volunteers. It recalls the devastating polio epidemics in the United States that occurred during the 1930s and 1950s and discusses the dangers of a resurgence that still remain in the United States unless the disease is wiped out worldwide. Obstacles to eradication include lack of awareness, the large number of children requiring vaccination, geographical dispersal of the populations, social mores, religious beliefs, and suspicion of domestic and foreign governments. The movie shows that many of those at risk remain ignorant of polio's epidemiology and believe the disease is "American made", fostering a reluctance to be vaccinated.

== Film festivals ==
The Final Inch was screened in April 2009 at the Salem Film Festival and was described as being "profoundly moving" in its revealing coverage of the polio virus's ongoing impact, and was described as a "dramatic testament to those working on the front lines of health care".

=== Select list of festival entries ===
- Salem Film Festival, Oregon.
- Maratea Film Festival, Italy.

== Partial cast ==
- Martha Mason
- Dr. Ashfaq Bhat
- Dr. Larry Brilliant
- Dr. David Heymann
- Munzareen Fatima
- Mikail Davenport
- Mohammad Gulzar Saifi

== Additional sources ==
- BBC News, "Final Inch towards the Oscars"
- IBN, "Not just Slumdog..., The Final Inch too in Oscar race"
- UNICEF, "Academy Award recognition for India’s fight to eradicate polio"
