= Ross Golan =

American singer-songwriter

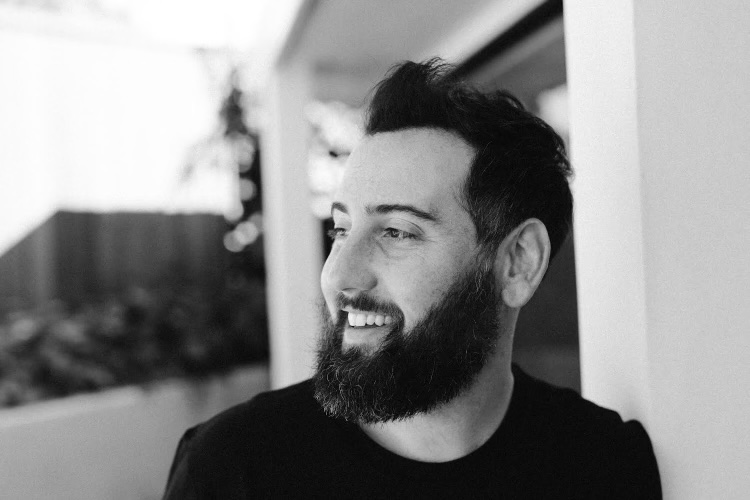
- Golan in 2012

Background information
- Born: Ross Jacob Golan; April 8, 1980 (age 46); Evanston, Illinois, U.S.
- Genres: Pop; hip hop; R&B; rock; country; musical theater
- Occupations: Singer-songwriter; record producer; composer; playwright
- Instruments: Vocals; guitar; piano
- Years active: 2003–present
- Labels: Warner Chappell Publishing; Interscope
- Website: www.twitter.com/rossgolan

Ross Jacob Golan (born April 8, 1980) is an American songwriter, record producer and playwright.

== Life and career ==
=== Early career ===
Golan graduated from Deerfield High School (Illinois) of Deerfield, Illinois in 1998. He studied music at the University of Southern California, and has since released songs with artists including Maroon 5, Justin Bieber, Celine Dion, Nicki Minaj, Gwen Stefani, Lady Antebellum, Michael Bublé, Selena Gomez, Keith Urban, Ariana Grande, Flo Rida, Enrique Iglesias, One Direction, P!nk, The Dixie Chicks, Pitbull, Lauv, Idina Menzel, Nelly, Luis Fonsi, Marshmello, Demi Lovato, Jason Derulo, Meghan Trainor, Cee Lo Green, 5 Seconds of Summer, Linkin Park, Prince Royce, Snoop Dogg, Charlie Puth, James Taylor, Avril Lavigne, Little Mix, Gavin DeGraw, Colbie Caillat, Andy Grammer, James Blunt, Big Sean, Travis Barker, Lukas Graham, Sabrina Carpenter, Skylar Grey, Rixton, The Vamps and Icona Pop, among others. He is the 2016 BMI "Pop Songwriter of the Year" and is currently published by Warner/Chappell Music. His concept album The Wrong Man was released worldwide by Interscope Records on 26 July 2019. He is the host of the podcast And The Writer Is and the co-chair of the Grammy’s Songwriters and Composers Wing.

=== Early record deals ===
Golan had multiple record deals, the first in 2003 with Insider Trading Corporation/EMI, which was a label he started while in school. The label teamed up with EMI's then-president Phil Quatararo, releasing Reagan Baby. After that, Golan co-founded Glacier Hiking, which had a hybrid publishing/label deal with Lionsgate - the band released a self-titled EP before breaking up in 2009.

== The Wrong Man ==
Golan developed a musical called The Wrong Man, based on the concept music album, which is about a man who is wrongly accused of a crime committed in Reno, Nevada. A one-man version of the show, starring Golan, ran in Los Angeles in February 2014 and received three Ovation Award wins out of four nominations. The musical made its way to New York City, playing Off-Broadway to previews beginning 18 September 2019, with an October 7 opening and scheduled run through 24 November 2019 at the Robert W. Wilson MCC Theater Space. The full-cast stage production included Tony winners and nominees Tommy Kail, Alex Lacamoire and Joshua Henry. The Wrong Man received 9 Drama Desk Awards nominations including Best Musical and 3 Lucille Lortel Awards nominations. The show was also honored with four Outer Critics Circle Awards including best original score for Golan.

The concept album was released worldwide by Interscope Records on 26 July 2019. That version made it to the big screen, with an animated film adaptation written and performed by Golan. The movie premiered at the Tribeca Film Festival in April 2019.

== Song credits ==
Title	Year	Artist	Album
"Anyway"	2011	Cee Lo Green	The Lady Killer: Platinum Edition
"Hold Up"	2011	Demi Lovato	Unbroken
"Take You"	2012	Justin Bieber	Believe
"Marilyn Monroe"	2012	Nicki Minaj	Pink Friday: Roman Reloaded
"Wipe Your Eyes"	2012	Maroon 5	Overexposed
"Happening"	2012	Medina	Forever
"Compass"	2013	Lady Antebellum	Golden
"Shame"	2013	Keith Urban	Fuse
"You Are Fire"	2013	Prince Royce	Soy el Mismo
"Back From The Dead feat. Big Sean and Travis Barker"	2013	Skylar Grey	Don't Look Down
"When I Find Love Again"	2013	James Blunt	Moon Landing
"3,000 Miles"	2013	Emblem3	Nothing to Lose
"Let It Rain"	2013	Eliza Doolittle	In Your Hands
"Unkiss Me"	2014	Maroon 5	V
"Mrs All American"	2014	5 Seconds of Summer	5 Seconds of Summer
"Stuck on a Feeling"	2014	Prince Royce	Double Vision
"Live It Up"	2014	Colbie Caillat	Gypsy Heart
"Nice Guys"	2014	Colbie Caillat	Gypsy Heart
"Love Pretenders"	2014	The Madden Brothers	Greetings from California
"Empty Spirits"	2014	The Madden Brothers	Greetings from California
"Same Old Love"	2015	Selena Gomez	Revival
"Survivors"	2015	Selena Gomez	Revival
"Cologne"	2015	Selena Gomez	Revival
"My House"	2015	Flo Rida	My House
"If I Could Fly"	2015	One Direction	Made in the A.M.
"Good To Be Alive (Hallelujah)"	2015	Andy Grammer	Magazines or Novels
"Painkiller (featuring Meghan Trainor)"	2015	Jason Derulo	Everything Is 4
"Talk About You"	2015	MIKA	No Place In Heaven
"Take The World By Storm"	2015	Lukas Graham	Lukas Graham
"What Happened To Perfect"	2015	Lukas Graham	Lukas Graham
"Funeral"	2015	Lukas Graham	Lukas Graham
"Wait on Me"	2015	Rixton	Let the Road
"Appreciated"	2015	Rixton	Let the Road
"Don't Cry For Me"	2015	Martina Stoessel	Tini
"80's Films"	2015	Jon Bellion	The Human Condition
"Wake Up"	2015	The Vamps	Wake Up
"I Found A Girl"	2015	The Vamps	Wake Up
"Held By Me"	2015	The Vamps	Wake Up
"Dangerous Woman"	2016	Ariana Grande	Dangerous Woman
"Fresh Eyes"	2016	Andy Grammer	The Good Parts
"Zillionaire"	2016	Flo Rida	Zillionaire
"Today Is Yesterday's Tomorrow"	2016	Michael Bublé	Nobody But Me
"Hopeless Romantic"	2016	Meghan Trainor	Thank You
"Mom"	2016	Meghan Trainor	Thank You
"Small World"	2016	Idina Menzel	idina.
"Then There's You"	2016	Charlie Puth	Nine Track Mind
"You Gotta Not"	2016	Little Mix	Glory Days
"Sounds Good to Me"	2017	Nelly	Sounds Good to Me
"Halfway Right"	2017	Linkin Park	One More Light
"Barbies"	2017	P!nk	Beautiful Trauma
"Change" featuring James Taylor	2018	Charlie Puth	Voicenotes
"Diamonds Are Forever"	2018	Sabrina Carpenter	Singular Act I
"Exhale"	2019	Sabrina Carpenter	Singular Act II
"Lovers Never Die"	2019	Celine Dion	Courage
"Sola"	2019	Luis Fonsi	Vida
"Goddess"	2019	Avril Lavigne	Head Above Water
"El Tejano"	2020	Lauv	How I'm Feeling
"March March"	2020	The Chicks	Gaslighter
"Feel Me"	2020	Selena Gomez	Rare
"Happy Now"	2021	Pentatonix	The Lucky Ones
"Let Me Reintroduce Myself"	2022	Gwen Stefani	Let Me Reintroduce Myself
"Walk It Out"	2022	New Hope Club	L.U.S.H.
"L.U.S.H."	2022	New Hope Club	L.U.S.H.
"Getting Better"	2022	New Hope Club	Getting Better
"Girl Who Does Both"	2022	New Hope Club	Getting Better
"Goodbye"	2022	Mimi Webb	Goodbye
"I'll Be"	2023	Celine Dion	Love Again soundtrack
"Slow Low"	2023	Jason Derulo	Slow Low
"Single Soon"	2023	Selena Gomez	Single Soon
"Layers"	2025	Jolin Tsai	Pleasure
"Pleasure"	2025	Jolin Tsai	Pleasure

== Podcast ==
Golan is also the podcast host of And the Writer Is... which is co-produced by Joe London. It has garnered three million downloads.

== Advocacy ==
In 2016, Golan co-authored an initiative to include songwriters in the Grammy Awards "Album of the Year" category, and 2017 marked the first year a songwriter received a statue for the award. In 2018, he was a leading voice in the Music Modernization Act. In 2019, he became the first songwriter to sit on the board of directors of the National Music Publishers Association in the 100-plus year history of that organization. In 2021, he advocated to have the 33% rule eradicated from the Grammy Awards "Album of the Year" category and in 2022, all songwriters, producers and engineers who worked on a nominated album will for the first time be recognized as nominees.

== Awards and nominations ==
Ovation Awards

- 2014: Winner, "Video/Projection Design" - Michael Hoy and Adam Flemming, for the Skylight Theatre Company production of The Wrong Man.
- 2014: Winner, "Lyrics/Music for an Original Musical" - Ross Golan, for the Skylight Theatre Company production of The Wrong Man.
- 2014: Winner, "Book for an Original Musical" - Ross Golan, for the Skylight Theatre Company production of The Wrong Man.
- 2014: Nominee, "Best Production of a Musical (Intimate Theatre)" - Skylight Theatre Company, for the production of The Wrong Man.

BMI Awards

- 2016: Winner, "Pop Songwriter of the Year".

Outer Critics Circle Award

- 2020: Winner, "Best Original Score" - for the MCC production of The Wrong Man.

Drama Desk Award

- 2020: Nominee, "Outstanding Score" - for the MCC production of The Wrong Man.
- 2020: Nominee, "Outstanding Musical" - for the MCC production of The Wrong Man.
