= Hear and Now =

2007 documentary film by Irene Taylor Brodsky

- DVD cover
- Directed by: Irene Taylor Brodsky
- Written by: Irene Taylor Brodsky
- Produced by: Sara Bernstein; Irene Taylor Brodsky; Crofton Diack; Eve Epstein; Sheila Nevins
- Starring: Paul and Sally Taylor
- Cinematography: Irene Taylor Brodsky; Crofton Diack
- Edited by: Geof Bartz; Irene Taylor Brodsky
- Music by: Joel Goodman
- Distributed by: HBO
- Release date: January 2007 (Sundance)
- Running time: 85 minutes
- Country: United States
- Languages: English; American Sign Language

Hear and Now is a 2007 documentary film by Irene Taylor Brodsky, winning awards in 2007 at the Sundance Film Festival and the Heartland Film Festival; and garnering a Peabody Award in 2008.

== Plot ==
The filmmaker's parents were both born deaf; and the couple raised children who were not deaf. Paul Taylor and his wife Sally Taylor were in their 60s when they both decided to have cochlear implant surgery, which could permit them to hear for the first time. The documentary follows what turns out to be a complicated journey from the comfortable world of silence to a profoundly challenging world of sounds and language.

The documentary introduces the couple's personal histories – childhood years learning to communicate in a special school, experiencing the stigma surrounding deafness in mainstream high schools, and having meaningful careers in the Deaf community at the National Technical Institute for the Deaf. Paul was a pioneer in development of TDD (telecommunications device for the deaf) which is also known as TTY.

The couple's filmmaker daughter chronicled these surgeries and the aftermath. The film shows some of the short-term consequences, including both expected and unexpected adjustments each would need to make. These two deaf people investigate the sounds and meaning of sounds; but learning what not to hear becomes an equally significant challenge. The camera records quite different reactions as the couple struggles to adjust after living deaf for a lifetime. The effects of the surgeries are not entirely positive.

The film establishes cochlear implant surgery in an intimate family setting rather than the larger context of the Deaf community.

== Production ==
This documentary was co-produced by Vermillion Films and HBO Documentary Films, which reduced the financial risks inherent in the project; and the film was distributed by HBO.

== Film festivals ==
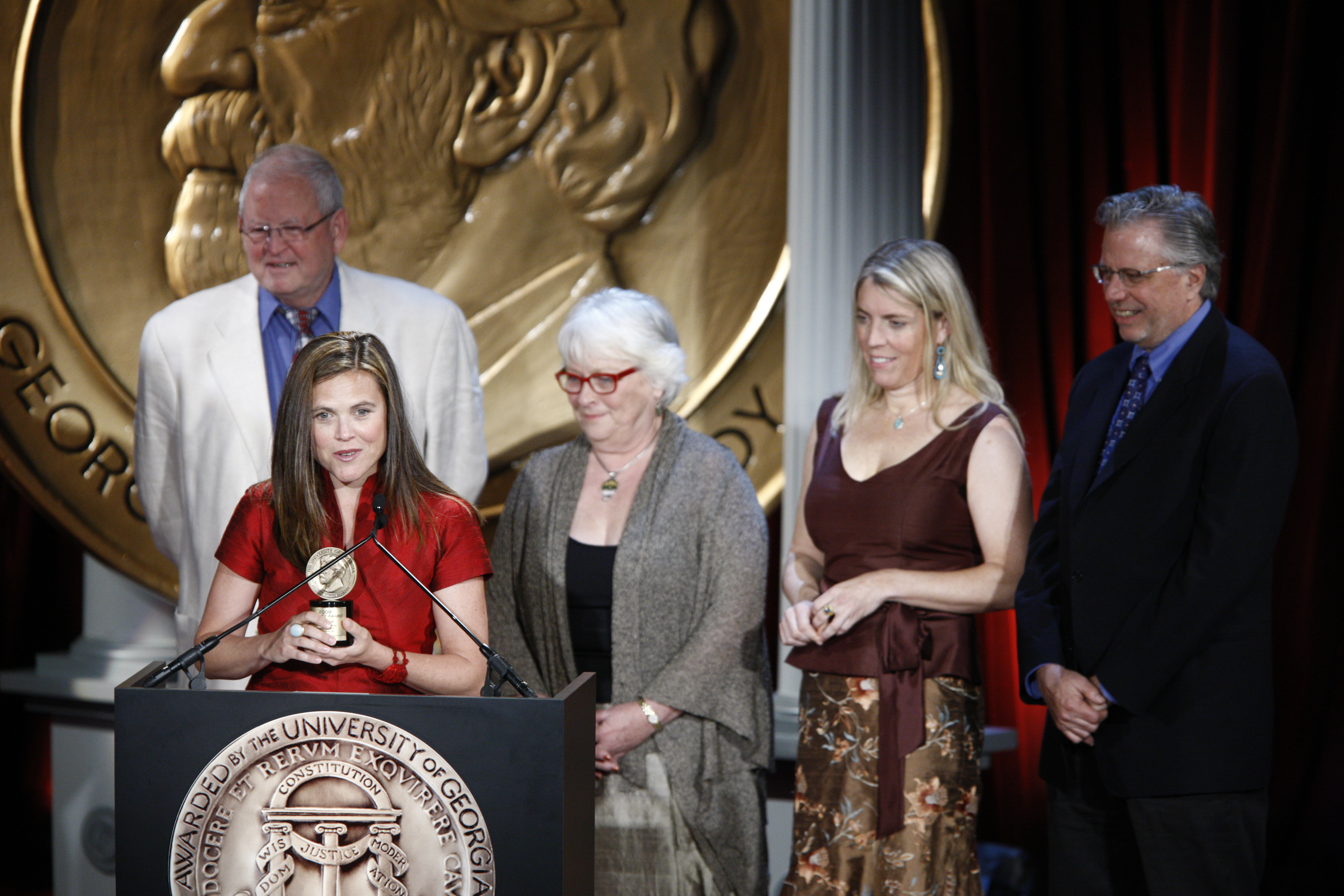
Irene Taylor Brodsky, her parents, filmmaker partner on Here and Now Crofton Diack, and Geof Bartz, the documentary's film editor, at the 68th Annual Peabody Awards

In 2007, Hear and Now won the prize for the Best Documentary at the Heartland Film Festival. At the Sundance Film Festival, the documentary won the Audience Award; and it was nominated for the Grand Jury Prize.

=== Select list of festival entries ===
- Heartland Film Festival, Best Documentary, Audience Award, 2007.
- Sundance Film Festival, Audience Award, 2007.
- Middle East International Film Festival
- Biogra Film Festival, Special Jury "Best Life" Award.
- EIDF Film Festival, Audience Award.
- American Film Festival in Moscow.

== See also ==
- List of Peabody Award winners (2000–2009)
- List of films featuring the deaf and hard of hearing
