= Love Again (soundtrack) =

Love Again (Soundtrack from the Motion Picture)

Soundtrack album by Celine Dion
- Released: 12 May 2023
- Recorded: 1989–2023
- Genre: Pop
- Length: 56:34
- Label: Columbia
- Producer: Walter Afanasieff; Afterhrs; D'Mile; The Elev3n; David Foster; Kristian Lundin; Max Martin; Stephan Moccio; Kyla Moscovich; Christopher Neil; Aldo Nova; Jim Steinman; Dan Wilson

Celine Dion chronology
Courage (2019)	Love Again (Soundtrack from the Motion Picture) (2023)	I Am: Celine Dion (2024)

Love Again (Soundtrack from the Motion Picture) is the soundtrack album to the 2023 American romantic comedy‑drama film Love Again, directed by James C. Strouse. It was released by Columbia Records on 12 May 2023. The album includes five new songs by Celine Dion alongside six of her earlier hits. The lead single, "Love Again", was issued on 13 April 2023, followed by "I'll Be" on 5 May 2023. Other new tracks are "Waiting on You", "Love of My Life", and "The Gift". Love Again received positive reviews from music critics and debuted at number one in Quebec, number two on the UK Soundtrack Albums chart, number six in Switzerland's Romandy region and number 10 in Belgium's Wallonia.

== Development ==
In October 2020, Priyanka Chopra, Sam Heughan, and Celine Dion joined the cast of the film, then tentatively titled Text for You. Principal photography began in October 2020 and concluded in early 2021. In April 2022, it was announced that the film had been retitled It's All Coming Back to Me, after the song "It's All Coming Back to Me Now", which Dion recorded for her 1996 album Falling into You. In November 2022, the title was changed again to Love Again. The film was released theatrically on 5 May 2023.

== Songs ==
Love Again includes 11 songs by Celine Dion that are woven into the narrative of the film and its characters. The album contains five new Dion songs and six of her past hits, among them a new edit of "It's All Coming Back to Me Now", "All by Myself", "That's the Way It Is", "Where Does My Heart Beat Now", "Courage", and the album version of "A New Day Has Come". The soundtrack also includes three score selections written and produced by American film composer Keegan DeWitt.

== Release and promotion ==
On 13 April 2023, Dion released the ballad "Love Again", the first song from the soundtrack and her first new music since her stiff-person syndrome diagnosis in December 2022. Due to her ongoing battle with the disease, Dion did not promote the film or its soundtrack. Gil Kaufman of Billboard described "Love Again" as a moving ballad built around gentle piano and acoustic guitar, with Dion softly delivering emotional lyrics: "Cuz you don't have to move a mountain, just keep moving/ Every move is a new emotion/ And you don't have to find the answers, just keep trying/ The sun will rise again/ The storms subside again/ This is not the end/ And you will love again". A lyric video featuring scenes from the film was also released on YouTube the same day.

The second upbeat track, "I'll Be", premiered on 5 May 2023. Its lyric video included clips from the film alongside photos and messages from fans around the world. Larisha Paul of Rolling Stone praised the song, calling it "a fittingly alternate‑universe version of My Heart Will Go On". She added that the chorus of "I'll Be", which promises "No, you won't be alone through the highs and the lows/You know you got me/Wherever you go", feels like a reimagining of "Near, far, wherever you are/I believe that the heart does go on", if Titanic instead followed the story of a grieving woman and a journalist profiling Celine Dion rather than two star‑crossed lovers on a sinking ship.

"Love Again" and "I'll Be" were successful in Quebec, reaching numbers one and two on the charts, respectively. Both songs also charted on the Canadian Digital Song Sales chart, reaching numbers 10 and 25. "Love Again" also peaked at number 86 on the UK Singles Downloads Chart. Following the soundtrack's release, another new uptempo song, "The Gift", debuted and peaked at number two on the Quebec Song Sales chart. As "The Gift" gained radio popularity in Quebec, it entered the Radio Songs chart at number eight in early June 2023 and peaked at number two in the first week of July 2023. The lyric video for another new song, "Waiting on You", was released on 26 June 2023.

== Critical reception ==
Entertainment Focus named "Love of My Life" as the finest out of the new songs and gave the album four out of five stars saying: "Dion's music has stood, and will continue to stand, the test of time. She's without a doubt one of the greatest vocalists there has ever been and that's evident across this soundtrack". The Rolling Stone also gave the album a positive review and called it a "killer soundtrack" saying: "it is of course Dion's overwhelming voice and music that flood your heart".

== Commercial performance ==
Love Again debuted at number one in Quebec and at number 77 on the Canadian Albums Chart. It spent its first three weeks at the top of the chart in Quebec. In the United States, it reached number 20 on Billboard's Top Soundtracks chart, and also peaked at number 42 on Top Current Album Sales and number 71 on the Top Album Sales chart.

In the United Kingdom, Love Again entered the UK Soundtrack Albums chart at number two. It also debuted on three other UK albums charts: number 16 on the UK Downloads Chart, number 22 on the UK Albums Sales Chart, and number 24 on the UK Physical Albums Chart. Love Again also peaked at number 32 on the Scottish Albums Chart.

Elsewhere in Europe, the album reached number 10 in Belgium's Wallonia, number 19 in Switzerland (including number six in Romandy), number 24 in both Belgium's Flanders and Portugal, and number 32 on the Polish Physical Albums chart. In France, Love Again peaked at number 11 on the Top Physical Albums chart and number 43 on the overall Top Albums chart, based on sales and streaming.

== Track listing ==
All songs are performed by Celine Dion, except the original film score compositions.

No.	Title	Writer(s)	Producer(s)	Length
1.	"Love Again"	Dan Wilson; Rosaileen Scher	Wilson; Sara Mulford^{[a]}	3:32
2.	"I'll Be"	John Ryan; Ross Golan; Jacob Kasher Hindlin; Ian Kirkpatrick	Afterhrs; J Kash^{[b]}	3:03
3.	"Waiting on You"	Liz Rodrigues; Sean Fischer	D'Mile; Kyla Moscovich	3:11
4.	"Love of My Life"	Stephan Moccio; Justin Tranter	Moccio	4:24
5.	"The Gift"	James G. Morales; Matt Morales; Dave Rodriguez; Tina Parol; Jason Wade	The Elev3n	3:24
6.	"It's All Coming Back to Me Now" (radio edit)	Jim Steinman	Steinman; Steven Rinkoff^{[c]}; Roy Bittan^{[c]}	5:49
7.	"Orpheus and Eurydice" (score)	Keegan DeWitt	DeWitt	3:57
8.	"All by Myself"	Eric Carmen; Sergei Rachmaninoff	David Foster	5:10
9.	"Where Does My Heart Beat Now"	Robert White Johnson; Taylor Rhodes	Christopher Neil	4:34
10.	"Celine Wisdom" (score)	DeWitt	DeWitt	0:58
11.	"A New Day Has Come"	Aldo Nova; Moccio	Walter Afanasieff; Nova	5:41
12.	"Courage"	Moccio; Erik Alcock; L. Rodrigues	Moccio; TommyD^{[d]}	4:13
13.	"That's the Way It Is"	Kristian Lundin; Max Martin; Andreas Carlsson	Martin; Lundin	4:02
14.	"Love Takes Courage" (score)	DeWitt	DeWitt	4:36
Total length:				56:34

=== Notes ===
- ^{^a} signifies an additional producer
- ^{^b} produced by Afterhrs under the direction of J Kash
- ^{^c} signifies a co-producer
- ^{^d} signifies an orchestral session co-producer

== Film score personnel ==
- Keegan DeWitt – composer, producer
- Dabney Morris – arrangements, orchestration
- Oleg Kondratenko – conductor
- Matt Ward – mixing
- Catherine Joy – score supervisor

== Charts ==
Chart performance
Chart (2023)	Peak position
Belgian Albums (Ultratop Flanders)	24
Belgian Albums (Ultratop Wallonia)	10
Canadian Albums (Billboard)	77
French Albums (SNEP)	43
Polish Physical Albums (ZPAV)	32
Portuguese Albums (AFP)	24
Quebec Albums (ADISQ)	1
Scottish Albums (Official Charts)	32
Swiss Albums (Schweizer Hitparade)	19
Swiss Romandy Albums (Schweizer Hitparade)	6
UK Album Downloads (Official Charts)	16
UK Soundtrack Albums (Official Charts)	2
US Soundtrack Albums (Billboard)	20
US Top Album Sales (Billboard)	71
US Top Current Album Sales (Billboard)	42

== Release history ==
Release history
Region	Date	Format	Label	Ref.
Various	12 May 2023	CD; digital download; streaming	Columbia	
