= Chum (film) =

2026 film by Jonathan Zuck

- Theatrical release poster
- Directed by: Jonathan Zuck
- Written by: Joe Leone; Jonathan Zuck
- Story by: Dick Grunert; Ryan R. Johnson; James Kondelik
- Produced by: Alice Eve; Kurt Fethke; Ryan R. Johnson; Lucas Jarach; Eamon O'Rourke
- Starring: Alice Eve; Eric Michael Cole; Elle Haymond; Sarah Siadat; Jim Klock
- Cinematography: Mac Fisken
- Edited by: Ethan Maniquis; Dan Riddle
- Music by: Jojo Draven
- Production companies: Redwire Pictures; Green Light Pictures; KCD Media
- Distributed by: Independent Film Company; Kinolights
- Release date: June 5, 2026
- Running time: 86 minutes
- Country: United States
- Language: English
- Box office: $37,487

Chum is a 2026 American horror thriller film directed by Jonathan Zuck and starring Alice Eve, Eric Michael Cole, Elle Haymond, Sarah Siadat, and Jim Klock. The film was scheduled to be released simultaneously in theaters and on digital platforms by IFC Films on June 5, 2026.

The film was panned by critics and audience for the writing, acting and most notably for the use of Generative AI on the VFX scenes.

== Plot ==
Tina and Tom arrive in Malta for their destination wedding, hoping for a picturesque start to their marriage. However, the couple is already experiencing significant friction, driven by unaddressed secrets and Tom's lack of support for Tina's anxieties. Trying to keep up appearances, Tom's enthusiastic best man, Rick, organizes a post-wedding celebration: a three-hour private catamaran excursion on the Mediterranean Sea. Tina, who is terrified of the ocean and does not know how to swim, is pressured into attending. The wedding party on the excursion includes Tina and Tom, Rick, their close friends Rachinda and Brittany, and Tina's cynical, unsupportive younger sister, Sadie. The boat is captained by a local skipper, Captain Daniels. Once the group is far from shore, a massive, bloodthirsty great white shark targets the catamaran, repeatedly ramming the hull.

During the chaotic initial assault, Captain Daniels is severely injured, and the boat sustains critical damage, taking on water. With the radio damaged and the vessel slowly sinking, the wedding party is left stranded in the open sea. As the shark circles the wreckage, picking at the sinking boat, the group's panic escalates.

Eventually, a rugged fisherman named Roy arrives in his own vessel, seemingly drawn by the distress. He assists the panicked survivors onto his boat, leaving the sinking catamaran behind. The group initially believes they have been saved, but Roy's demeanor quickly grows erratic and sinister. It is soon revealed that Roy is not a random rescuer, but a grief-stricken widower on a deranged mission. Five years earlier, his own wife was killed by the exact same shark while they were celebrating their marriage.

Driven mad by the loss, Roy has spent years hunting the beast. Roy takes the group hostage, announcing his true intentions. He refuses to take them back to the mainland; instead, he plans to use the wedding party as human bait—or "chum"—to draw the shark out so he can finally exact his revenge.

Roy reveals his true intentions and holds the wedding party hostage on his vessel. Roy begins orchestrating scenarios to get the guests into the water to draw the shark's attention. The captain and several members of the wedding party are either pushed or fall overboard during the struggle. Once in the water, they are swiftly attacked and devoured by the shark.

The dwindling survivors desperately attempt to fight off Roy while avoiding the water. During the chaos, characters are impaled and severely injured in their attempts to disarm the fisherman. In a final bid for survival, Tina confronts both Roy and the shark. Despite her fear of the water and inability to swim, she attempts to kill the shark herself, utilizing a weapon in a direct callback to an earlier conversation. The film concludes with a final inner monologue from Roy, reflecting on the loss of his wife and his total descent into madness and murder in the open ocean.

== Cast ==
- Alice Eve as Tina
- Eric Michael Cole as Tom
- Elle Haymond as Sadie
- Sarah Siadat as Rachinda
- Lisa Yaro as Britney
- Jim Klock as Roy
- Robert Grose as Captain Daniels

== Production ==
The production is a collaboration of several independent production companies, with a heavy creative lineup behind the script. The concept and story outline were crafted by James Kondelik, Ryan R. Johnson, and Dick Grunert. Director Jonathan Zuck teamed up with co-writer Joe Leone for the story into the final shooting script. The film was produced under the banners of Redwire Pictures, Green Light Pictures, and KCD Media, with Film Bridge International handling the early sales collection. The film was shot on location in Malta. IFC Films acquired the distribution rights for the film, releasing the official poster and trailer in May 2026. Alice Eve serving as a producer on the film alongside Ryan R. Johnson and Kurt Fethke and the final cut of the film is locked at a concise 87 minutes.

== Release ==
Chum was released for a simultaneous theatrical and digital/VOD release on June 5, 2026.

== Reception ==
On the review aggregator website Rotten Tomatoes, 19% of 26 critics' reviews are positive, with an average rating of 2.9/10.

Chad Collins of Dread Central gave the film a rating of 1.5 out of 5 and he wrote: "Chum lacks identity, taste, tension, and really everything that signals a horror movie as a horror movie."

Matt Donato of Daily Dead gave the film a negative review, a rating of 1.5 out of 5 and wrote: "Chum is what happens when you ask AI to make "Dangerous Animals meets 47 Meters Down," and it's bad."

George and Josh Bate of ScreenAnarchy gave the film a rating of 2 out of 5 and wrote: "With visual effects, filmmaking, and acting largely devoid of personality, Chum is salvaged only by its fusion of the shark movie and serial killer thriller genres."

Robert Kojder of Flickering Myth also gave the film a negative review and a rating of 1 out of 5 and said: "At one point, one character removes a spear or arrow from another impaled character only to ask, "Are you okay?" Chum is far from okay; it is inept at every turn."

== See also ==
- List of killer shark films
