= Heartland International Film Festival =

Annual film festival in Indianapolis, Indiana, US

Festival Logo

The Heartland Film Festival (HFF) is a film festival held each October in Indianapolis, Indiana, hosted by the nonprofit organization Heartland Film, Inc. The festival was first held in 1992, with the goal to "inspire filmmakers and audiences through the transformative power of film." HFF accepts entries of feature-length films at least 40 minutes long, including student submissions.

Shorter films are accepted through Heartland Film's spinoff, the Indy Shorts Film Festival, which runs every July. Indy Shorts is a qualifying festival for the BAFTAs, Goya Awards, and the short film categories at the Academy Awards, with the festival's Animated, Documentary, and Narrative Grand Prize winners respectively eligible for the Animated, Documentary, and Live Action Oscars.

== Grand Prize and Audience Choice Award-winning films ==
Year	Grand Prize for Best Narrative Feature	Grand Prize for Best Documentary Feature	Grand Prize for Best Short Film	Audience Choice Award		
Year	Grand Prize for Best Narrative Feature	Grand Prize for Best Documentary Feature	Grand Prize for Best Short Film	Narrative Feature	Documentary Feature	Short Film
1999	Wayward Son	–				
2000	The Rising Place	–				
2001	The War Bride	–				
2002	To End All Wars	–				
2003	Saints and Soldiers	–				
2004	Love's Brother	–				
2005	End of the Spear	–	A Kiss on the Nose	Innocent Voices	Earthling	The Man Who Walked Between the Towers
2006	Shooting Dogs	The Hip Hop Project	Shade	Shooting Dogs	A Man Named Pearl	I Want to Be a Pilot
2007	Bella	Hear and Now	Validation	Man in the Chair	Hear and Now	Validation
2008	Captain Abu Raed	Pray the Devil Back to Hell	Victoria	Captain Abu Raed	Ripple of Hope	Go
2009	Welcome	P-Star Rising	Bicycle (Jitensha)	Like Dandelion Dust, A Shine of Rainbows (tie)	After the Storm	Grande Drip
2010	The Space Between	Freedom Riders	The Butterfly Circus	Ways to Live Forever	Once In My Life	The Butterfly Circus
2011	Red Dog	Crime After Crime	Thief	Red Dog	Crime After Crime	Sun City Picture House
2012	Cairo 678	Rising from Ashes	Head Over Heels	A Bottle in the Gaza Sea	Stuck, Rising from Ashes (tie)	It Ain't Over
2013	Hide Your Smiling Faces	The Network	The Amber Amulet (Narrative Short), Wrinkles of the City: La Havna (Documentary Short)	23 Blast	Life According to Sam, Blood Brother (tie)	The Amber Amulet (Narrative Short), Running Blind (Documentary Short)
2014	Siddharth	Happiness	Record (Narrative Short), Showfolk (Documentary Short)	Where Hope Grows	Becoming Bulletproof	Till Then (Narrative Short), Showfolk (Documentary Short)
2015	The Judgement	Romeo Is Bleeding	The Way of Tea (Narrative Short), The 100 Years Show (Documentary Short)	Marie's Story	dream/killer	Moving ON (Narrative Short), Teen Press (Documentary Short)
2016	Home Care	Night School	The Ravens (Narrative Short), Mining Poems or Odes (Documentary Short)	Te Ata	Night School	Good Business (Narrative Short), Violet (Documentary Short)
2017	Red Dog: True Blue	Liyana	The Cage (Narrative Short), Edges (Documentary Short)	The Bachelors & Mum's List (tie)	I'll Push You	Me and My Father (Narrative Short), Refugee (Documentary Short)
2018	The Elephant and the Butterfly	On Her Shoulders	Shorts moved to Indy Shorts International Film Fest	Indivisible	Emanuel	Shorts moved to Indy Shorts International Film Fest
2019	House of Hummingbird	Sama	–	Feast of the Seven Fishes	Jump Shot	–
2020	There Is No Evil	76 Days	–	Not awarded due to COVID-19 pandemic		–
2021	Americanish	All These Sons	–	Peace By Chocolate	For The Left hand	–
2022	Our Father, The Devil	Hidden Letters	Shorts moved to Indy Shorts International Film Fest	Rally Caps	Butterfly In The Sky	Shorts moved to Indy Shorts International Film Fest
2023	Simón	We Dare To Dream	Shorts moved to Indy Shorts International Film Fest	Sight	The Body Politic	Shorts moved to Indy Shorts International Film Fest

== See also ==
- List of attractions and events in Indianapolis
