= Ashes (Celine Dion song) =

- Steve Aoki remix cover

Single by Celine Dion

from the album Deadpool 2 (Original Motion Picture Soundtrack)
- Released: May 3, 2018
- Studio: Rokstone (London); The Palace (Las Vegas); MixStar (Virginia Beach)
- Genre: Pop
- Length: 3:19
- Label: Columbia
- Songwriters: Petey Martin; Jordan Smith; Tedd T.
- Producer: Steve Mac

Celine Dion singles chronology
"Les yeux au ciel" (2017)	"Ashes" (2018)	"Imperfections" (2019)

Music video
- "Ashes" on YouTube

"Ashes" is a song recorded by Canadian singer Celine Dion for the soundtrack of the 2018 American superhero film Deadpool 2, based on the Marvel Comics character Deadpool and distributed by 20th Century Fox. It was written by Petey Martin, Jordan Smith and Tedd T., and produced by Steve Mac, with a remix version by Steve Aoki. Released as the lead single from the film's soundtrack by Columbia Records on May 3, 2018, the track was accompanied by its music video. "Ashes" received positive reviews from critics and became a commercial success, reaching number one on the US Dance Club Songs chart—Dion's third chart‑topper there after "Misled" (1994) and "Taking Chances" (2008).

Director David Leitch sought an original song for Deadpool 2 that could support the film's emotional core, and "Ashes" emerged from that process. He and actor‑producer Ryan Reynolds invited Dion to record the track, and she accepted. The song was crafted to balance the film's satirical tone with its role as a genuine emotional through‑line. Leitch also directed the music video, which features Dion, Reynolds and dancer Yanis Marshall, who appears as Deadpool in choreographed sequences performed in high heels.

In November 2019, Billboard reported that "Ashes" had accumulated more than 64 million on‑demand streams in the United States, making it Dion's sixth most‑streamed track in the country.

== Background ==
During the development of Deadpool 2, director David Leitch believed that maintaining the personal stakes of the first film—centering the story on "an existential crisis and a deeply personal cause" for Deadpool—would be more compelling than shifting toward global stakes. As part of this approach, he sought an original song that could reflect these themes and serve as an emotional through‑line for several characters, similar in spirit to "Take My Breath Away" and "My Heart Will Go On". "Ashes" plays over the film's James Bond‑style opening credits.

== Composition and recording ==
Leitch and music supervisor John Houlihan met with songwriters to discuss the thematic direction of the piece, with Leitch focusing on his narrative goals. They selected "Ashes", written by Petey Martin, Jordan Smith and Tedd T., which Leitch felt "ticked all the boxes" of what he wanted to achieve. He then consulted actor‑producer Ryan Reynolds about finding a "contemporary artist who's got the chops to make it super emotional". Reynolds suggested Celine Dion, calling her an "incredible singer" capable of working within the film's subversive tone. According to Leitch, Dion agreed not only because her son is a fan of Deadpool but also because she was "taken aback by the song" and understood their intentions. Although the track contains a satirical edge, Leitch felt that Dion's performance elevated it into a genuine emotional anchor for the film.

== Release ==
"Ashes" was released as a single by Columbia Records on May 3, 2018, alongside its music video. On May 7, 2018, it was sent to US adult contemporary radio stations. Columbia released the full Deadpool 2 soundtrack, which includes "Ashes", on May 18. Dion added the song to the set list of her Las Vegas residency show Celine on May 22, 2018, and it was also performed during her 2018 Asia‑Pacific tour. On June 21, 2024, "Ashes" was included on the I Am: Celine Dion soundtrack.

== Critical response ==
Issy Sampson of the Guardian wrote that beyond the "wackiness" of Deadpool, the track is "a stone‑cold Céline banger that's begging to be wailed at karaoke five wines in. Fantastique". Nick Johnston of Vanyaland described it as "pretty damn good ... if you're into [Dion's] brand of diva pop", praising its tone and comparing it to the "'90s tie‑in videos" that once aired on MTV. Beth Elderkin of Gizmodo wrote that the combination of Dion and Deadpool brought her joy, calling the song "surprisingly good".

Brian Kremkau of ReadJunk suggested that the track could be nominated for the Academy Award for Best Original Song and praised its 1990s sensibility and the aesthetic of the music video. The Music described the song and video as "confusingly inspiring". NPR Music's Lars Gotrich commented that Dion was "too good for Deadpool" and said the song "kind of slaps! You know, if a Céline Dion ballad could slap". Chuck Campbell of Knoxville News praised the track for its earnest quality, while Jonathan Broxton of Movie Music UK also argued that it deserved an Academy Award nomination.

== Music video ==
Leitch and Reynolds wanted to create a music video to accompany the song. Although Leitch initially preferred that audiences encounter the track for the first time within the film, he ultimately felt that releasing the video beforehand was important for marketing because the song is "a central part of the movie". Both he and Reynolds believed it was essential to shape the video themselves rather than hand it off to another director.

Leitch, who had long wanted to direct a music video, brought in cinematographer Jonathan Sela, whose experience in music videos helped guide the process. Leitch noted similarities between staging the choreography and staging action sequences for his films. The video was filmed in the Colosseum at Caesars Palace, where Dion performs her Las Vegas residency shows, with choreography by Yanis Marshall. Reynolds had wanted to involve Marshall in the Deadpool films after being introduced by his wife Blake Lively to videos of Marshall dancing in high heels. Marshall spent 12 hours performing in the Deadpool costume and heels, later describing the outfit as a "nightmare" to dance in. Leitch said that Reynolds and Dion were "Canadian icons" and enjoyed giving them a brief comedic exchange at the end of the video, which the two devised together.

== Remixes ==
After performing with Dion at a charity event at Caesars Palace in November 2017, which raised funds for victims of the 2017 Las Vegas shooting, producer Steve Aoki created a "tasteful remix" of the track, referred to as a "Deadpool Demix". It was released online by Sony Music on May 25, 2018. Another remix by American producer DJ Riddler received official approval a month later and was released commercially on August 3, 2018.

== Charts ==
Chart performance
Chart (2018)	Peak position
Australia (ARIA)	94
Belgium (Ultratip Bubbling Under Wallonia)	16
Canada Hot 100 (Billboard)	72
Canada AC (Billboard)	41
Denmark Digital Songs (Billboard)	10
France (SNEP)	15
Hungary (Single Top 40)	17
New Zealand Heatseekers (RMNZ)	8
Quebec Digital Song Sales (ADISQ)	1
Scottish Singles Sales (Official Charts)	19
South Korea (Gaon International Download)	57
Spain Physical/Digital (PROMUSICAE)	44
Sweden Digital Songs (Billboard)	9
Switzerland (Schweizer Hitparade)	65
Switzerland (Media Control Romandy)	11
UK Singles (Official Charts)	86
US Bubbling Under Hot 100 (Billboard)	17
US Adult Contemporary (Billboard)	22
US Dance Club Songs (Billboard)	1
US Digital Song Sales (Billboard)	28

== Certifications ==
Certifications
Region	Certification	Certified units/sales
Canada (Music Canada)	Platinum	80,000^{‡}
France (SNEP)	Gold	100,000^{‡}
New Zealand (RMNZ)	Gold	15,000^{‡}
Poland (ZPAV)	Gold	25,000^{‡}
United Kingdom (BPI)	Silver	200,000^{‡}
^{‡} Sales+streaming figures based on certification alone.

== See also ==
- List of Billboard number-one dance songs of 2018
