= Let the Road =

Studio album by Rixton
- Released: 3 March 2015
- Recorded: 2013–14
- Genres: Pop; reggae; R&B
- Length: 35:41
- Labels: School Boy; Giant Little Man; Mad Love; Interscope
- Producers: Benny Blanco; Steve Mac; Ross Golan; Robopop; Stargate; Daniel Wilkin; Chris Sclafani

Rixton chronology
Me and My Broken Heart (2014)	Let the Road (2015)	Woah (Note: Released under the name "Push Baby") (2019)

Singles from Let the Road
- 1. "Me and My Broken Heart" Released: 14 March 2014; 2. "Wait on Me" Released: 23 July 2014; 3. "Hotel Ceiling" Released: 21 January 2015; 4. "We All Want the Same Thing" Released: 31 May 2015

Let the Road is the debut studio album by English pop band Rixton (now called Push Baby) released on 3 March 2015. The album was released via School Boy Records, Giant Little Man, Mad Love Records and Interscope Records. It was preceded by the release of the UK number-one hit single "Me and My Broken Heart", as well as the second international single, "Wait on Me". The album debuted and peaked at number 19 on the UK Albums Chart and at number 32 on the US Billboard 200.

== Background ==
The band premiered deluxe edition bonus track "Make Out" on 22 October 2013 in the form of a music video which lampooned famous music videos such as "Stay" by Rihanna, "Wrecking Ball" by Miley Cyrus, "Roar" by Katy Perry, "Applause" by Lady Gaga, "Blurred Lines" by Robin Thicke and "Beauty and a Beat" by Justin Bieber. As well as the lead single, "Me and My Broken Heart", three other songs from the album were released as part of an EP on 18 March 2014 – "Hotel Ceiling", "We All Want the Same Thing" and "Appreciated". Rixton said of the EP, "It's overwhelming to have gone from writing songs in Danny's caravan to seeing the world performing our music. We've worked extremely hard and have had a blast recording the EP. The songs are very eclectic and we think there's something for everyone!".

"Wait on Me" was then premiered as the second single to be released from the album. "Whole" was also pre-released prior to the album's launch, being made available as part of the soundtrack to the film "The Giver". An acoustic version of "Speakerphone" was uploaded to the band's official Vevo account in September 2014, while both "I Like Girls" and "Beautiful Excuses" were premiered live during the summer of 2014, with live versions being uploaded to YouTube.

== Recording ==
The album was predominantly co-written and produced by Benny Blanco, with additional production from Robopop, Ross Golan, Steve Mac, Daniel Wilkin and Chris Sclafani. Band members Roche, Wilkin, Morgan and Bagnall only have a co-writing credit on one song on the entire album, "Whole". Ed Sheeran, Mike Posner and Rob Thomas all have co-writing credits on the album. The Sheeran-penned "Hotel Ceiling" was the first song written for the album. The British deluxe edition of the album includes a live version of "Wait on Me" as a bonus track, while the American version features a remix of "Me and My Broken Heart". Lead singer Jake Roche said of the album: "Let The Road is something we're incredibly proud of. Songs have survived 6 years to make it on this album, back when me and Danny were writing in the caravan having no idea where they would end up. We feel incredibly humbled to be able to share this with our fans, and we hope you enjoy listening to it, just as much as we enjoyed making it."

== Critical reception ==
Professional ratings
Review scores
Source	Rating
AllMusic	3/5 stars
ANDPOP	4/5 stars
Evigshed Mag	4/5 stars
Knoxville News Sentinel	3.5/5 stars

Let the Road received positive responses from critics. Chuck Campbell from Knoxville News Sentinel gave the album 3 1/2 stars out of 5 and stated that "the best takeaway from Let the Road is that the release is solid. It's not frontloaded with highlights and then filled out with forgettable fluff; if anything, it only gets stronger as it goes."

== Singles ==
- "Make Out" is a promotional single that was released from the Let the Road Album on 14 March 2014. The promotional single was released in the United States on 18 March 2014, but it was never released as an official single. "Make Out" did not enter the UK Singles Chart, however there was a music video created for the song. The music video features the band being arrested after being conned during a card game.
- "Me and My Broken Heart" was released as the first single released from Let the Road on 14 March 2014. The single was pre-released as part of a four-track EP in the United States on 18 March 2014. The single peaked at number one on the UK Singles Chart. The music video features the band being arrested after being conned during a card game.
- "Wait on Me" was released as the second single from the album on 23 July 2014. The music video premiered on October 8, 2014, in the form of an interactive video, where the viewer is able to choose the direction that the video will take.
- "Hotel Ceiling" was released as the third single from the album on 21 January 2015.
- "We All Want the Same Thing" was released as the fourth single from the album on 31 May 2015.

== Track listing ==
Let the Road — Standard version
No.	Title	Writer(s)	Producer(s)	Length
1.	"Let the Road"	Jake Roche; Charley Bagnall; Danny Wilkin; Lewi Morgan	Benny Blanco; Chris Sclafani	3:00
2.	"Wait on Me"	Benjamin Levin; Mikkel S. Eriksen; Tor Erik Hermansen; Wayne Hector; Jennifer Decilveo; Dan Omelio	Blanco; Stargate	3:57
3.	"Appreciated"	Levin; Ross Golan	Blanco; Golan^{[a]}	3:52
4.	"Beautiful Excuses"	Roche; Bagnall; Wilkin; Morgan	Wilkin; Chris Sclafani	4:09
5.	"Me and My Broken Heart"	Levin; Ammar Malik; Steve Mac; Hector; Rob Thomas	Blanco; Mac	3:13
6.	"Hotel Ceiling"	Levin; Edward Sheeran	Blanco	3:10
7.	"I Like Girls"	Levin; Malik; Mike Posner	Blanco	2:46
8.	"Speakerphone"	Roche; Bagnall; Wilkin; Morgan	Wilkin; Sclafani	3:28
9.	"We All Want the Same Thing"	Levin; Malik; Omelio; Joshua Coleman; Jacob Kasher	Blanco; Robopop	3:45
10.	"Whole"	Levin; Malik; Omelio; Roche; Bagnall; Wilkin; Morgan	Blanco; Malik	3:39
Total length:				35:41

Let the Road — International deluxe version and Target deluxe version
No.	Title	Writer(s)	Producer(s)	Length
11.	"Make Out"	Levin; Malik; Eric Frederic	Ricky Reed; Blanco	3:30
12.	"Me and My Broken Heart" (Pnau remix)	Levin; Malik; Mac; Hector; Thomas	Blanco; Mac	5:32

Let the Road — British and Irish deluxe version (bonus tracks)
No.	Title	Writer(s)	Producer(s)	Length
11.	"Make Out"	Levin; Malik; Eric Frederic	Blanco	3:30
12.	"Wait on Me" (Live from LA's El Rey Theater)	Levin; Omelio; Hector; Golan; Hermansen; Eriksen	Blanco; Stargate	4:59

Notes

- ^{^[a]} signifies an additional producer.

== Charts ==
Chart (2015)	Peak position
Scottish Albums (Official Charts)	24
UK Albums (Official Charts)	19
UK Album Downloads (Official Charts)	14
US Billboard 200	32

== Certifications ==
Region	Certification
Romania (UFPR)	Gold

== Release history ==
Region	Date	Label(s)	Format(s)
Canada	3 March 2015	School Boy; Giant Little Man; Mad Love; Interscope	CD; digital download; streaming
United States	3 March 2015	School Boy; Giant Little Man; Mad Love; Interscope	CD; digital download; streaming
Australia	1 May 2015	School Boy; Giant Little Man; Mad Love; Interscope	CD; digital download; streaming
Germany	1 May 2015	School Boy; Giant Little Man; Mad Love; Interscope	CD; digital download; streaming
Netherlands	1 May 2015	School Boy; Giant Little Man; Mad Love; Interscope	CD; digital download; streaming
France	4 May 2015	School Boy; Giant Little Man; Mad Love; Interscope	CD; digital download; streaming
Belgium	4 May 2015	School Boy; Giant Little Man; Mad Love; Interscope	CD; digital download; streaming
Ireland	12 June 2015	School Boy; Giant Little Man; Mad Love; Interscope	CD; digital download; streaming
United Kingdom	15 June 2015	School Boy; Giant Little Man; Mad Love; Interscope	CD; digital download; streaming

== See also ==
- List of certified albums in Romania
