= Irene Taylor (filmmaker) =

American director and producer (born 1970)

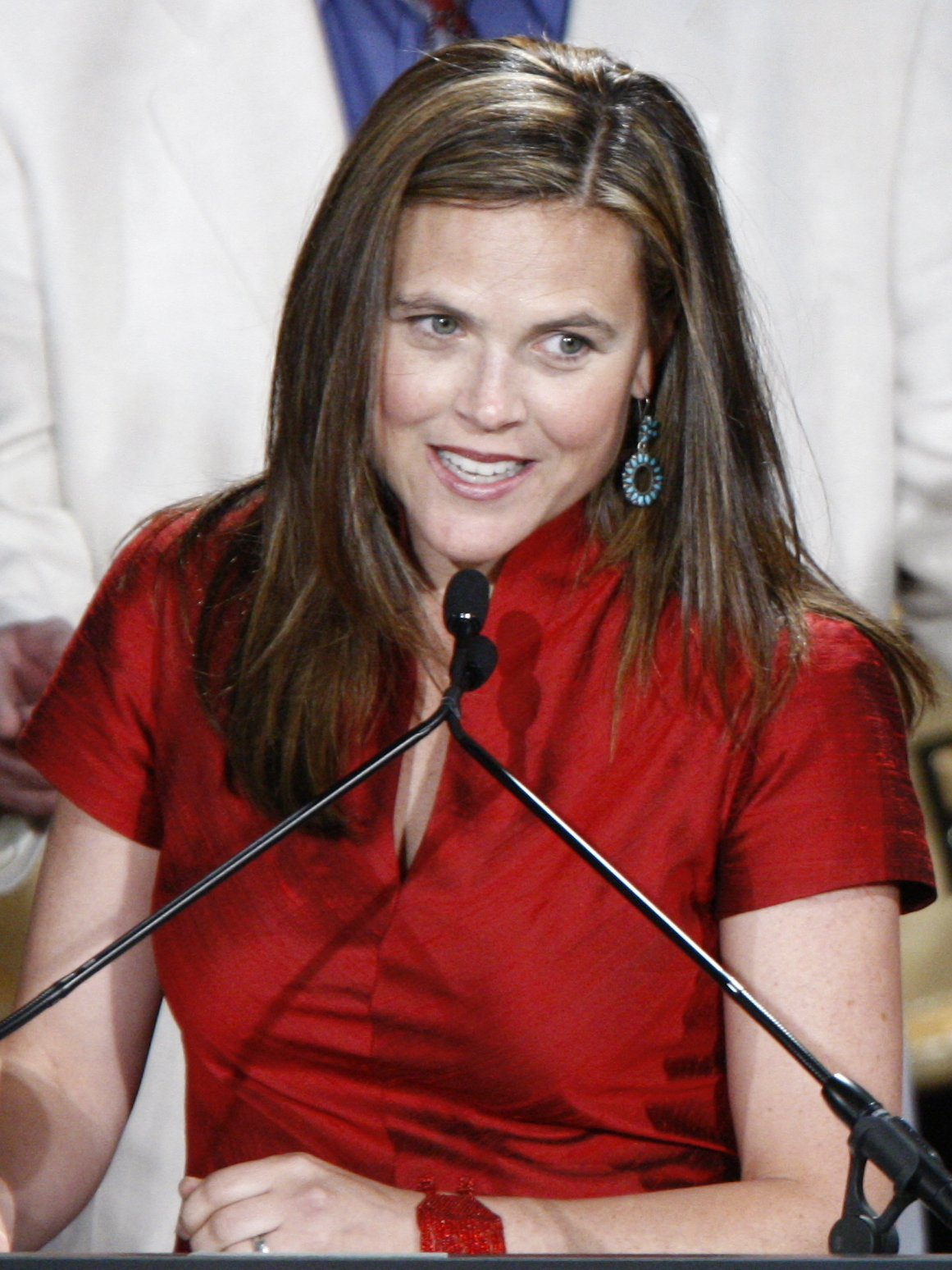
- Taylor in 2009
- Born: June 15, 1970 (age 55); St. Louis, Missouri
- Education: New York University, Columbia University Graduate School Of Journalism
- Alma mater: NYU (BA); Columbia University (MA)
- Occupations: Film director Film producer Writer; Cinematographer editor
- Years active: 2004 – present
- Father: Paul Taylor

Irene Taylor (born June 15, 1970) is a film director and producer.

== Early life ==
Taylor was born on June 15, 1970, to deaf parents Sally and Paul Taylor. She graduated from New York University and Columbia University's Graduate School of Journalism.

== Career ==
Taylor began her documentary career in photojournalism. Her first feature documentary, Hear and Now, a documentary memoir about her deaf parents, won the Audience Award at the 2007 Sundance Film Festival, a Peabody Award, and numerous awards at festivals around the world. It was also nominated by the Producers Guild of America in 2008 for Documentary of the Year. Her HBO feature documentary Beware the Slenderman received two 2017 Critics' Choice Award nominations, for Best Director and Best Documentary, and was also nominated for a 2018 Emmy Award.

Taylor's previous credits include several theatrically released short films, all which aired on HBO. The Final Inch, about the global effort to eradicate polio, was nominated for an Academy award, multiple Emmys, and won the IDA's Pare Lorentz Award. After the 2010 Gulf oil spill, she followed the life of a single bird found coated in oil, and made Saving Pelican 895 which won an Emmy for its affecting music. She directed One Last Hug: Three Days at Grief Camp, which won the 2014 Prime Time Emmy for Best Children's Programming. In 2016 she released Open Your Eyes, about an aging couple living in the Himalayas determined to regain their sight. Taylor's short opinion film Between Sound and Silence was released by The New York Times Op-Docs.

Taylor's early career began in Kathmandu, Nepal, working as a Himalayan Mountain guide and author. Her photography book, Buddhas in Disguise, became the basis for her first documentary film, made in 1993 with the United Nations. She was a producer for CBS Sunday Morning, and founded her production company Vermilion Films in 2006.

In 2019, Taylor made Moonlight Sonata: Deafness in Three Movements about her deaf son, her deaf father and Beethoven, as he went deaf while writing his famous sonata. It premiered at the 2019 Sundance Film Festival, and was nominated for a 2020 PrimeTime Emmy Award for Special Merit in Documentary Filmmaking. That year, Taylor founded The Treehouse Project, a nonprofit forging broader accessibility to documentary film.

Taylor's film Leave No Trace: A Hidden History of the Boy Scouts premiered at the 2022 Tribeca Film Festival, and won a 2022 Columbia-DuPont award.

In 2021 it was announced that Taylor would be working with Sony Music on a documentary about the French-Canadian singer Celine Dion. The film, I Am: Celine Dion, was released on June 21, 2024.

Taylor's documentaries have appeared on HBO, Hulu, CBS, A&E, Fox, and the History Channel.

== Filmography ==
- 2007: Hear and Now
- 2009: The Final Inch
- 2011: Saving Pelican 895
- 2014: One Last Hug: Three Days at Grief Camp
- 2015: Open Your Eyes
- 2016: Beware the Slenderman
- 2017: The Life Story
- 2018: The Listening Project
- 2018: Homeless: The Soundtrack
- 2018: Between Sound and Silence
- 2019: Moonlight Sonata
- 2022: Leave No Trace: A Hidden History of the Boy Scouts
- 2023: Trees and Other Entanglements
- 2024: I Am: Celine Dion

== Awards and nominations ==
- 2004: Emmy Award for an "Outstanding Feature in a Regularly Scheduled Broadcast", Heart of the Country
- 2007: Sundance Film Festival Audience Award, Hear and Now
- 2008: Peabody Award, Hear and Now
- 2009: Nominee for Academy Award, The Final Inch
- 2016: Critics' Choice Documentary Awards: Nominee for Best Documentary Feature and for Best Direction of a Documentary Feature for Beware the Slenderman
- 2020: Nominee for Emmy in Exceptional Merit in Documentary Filmmaking, Moonlight Sonata: Deafness in Three Movements
- 2022: Columbia duPont Award for Excellence in Broadcast, Documentary and Online Journalism for Leave No Trace: A Hidden History of the Boy Scouts

== Select works ==
- 1997 – Buddhas in Disguise: Deaf People of Nepal? San Diego, California: DawnSignPress. ISBN 978-0-915-03559-5; OCLC 36364073; the book's stories and photographs shed light on the Deaf culture and community in Nepal.
- 1999 – I Witness: Polygamy. Amazon Prime Video. Main videographer and a producer of five 24-minute episodes on Alex Joseph's polygamist family just before Joseph died of liver cancer.

== See also ==
- International Documentary Association
- Mohammad Gulzar Saifi
