= Love Again (2023 film) =

Film by James C. Strouse

- Theatrical release poster
- Directed by: James C. Strouse
- Written by: James C. Strouse
- Based on: SMS für Dich by; Andrea Willson; Malte Welding; Karoline Herfurth; Sophie Kluge; Anike Decker; SMS für Dich by Sofie Cramer
- Produced by: Basil Iwanyk; Erica Lee; Esther Hornstein
- Starring: Priyanka Chopra; Sam Heughan; Celine Dion
- Cinematography: Andrew Dunn
- Edited by: Jesse Gordon
- Music by: Keegan DeWitt
- Production companies: Screen Gems; Thunder Road Films
- Distributed by: Sony Pictures Releasing
- Release date: May 5, 2023
- Running time: 104 minutes
- Country: United States
- Language: English
- Budget: $9 million
- Box office: $12.7 million

Love Again is a 2023 American romantic comedy-drama film written and directed by James C. Strouse. It is an English-language remake of the 2016 German film SMS für Dich, which was based on a 2009 novel by Sofie Cramer. The film stars Priyanka Chopra, Sam Heughan, and Celine Dion in her first feature film, in which she plays a fictionalized version of herself.

Mira is a young woman trying to move past the pain of her fiancé John's death two years earlier by sending texts to his old cell phone number, and she eventually forms a connection with Rob, the man to whom the number has been reassigned.

Love Again was released in the United States on May 5, 2023, by Sony Pictures Releasing. It received negative reviews from critics.

== Plot ==
Mira Ray and her almost fiancé John are deeply in love and often exchange playful text messages. Moments after a warm interaction in a café, John steps outside and is struck by a car in full view of Mira.

Two years later, Mira is living with her parents outside the city. Her sister Suzy frequently calls, urging her to return, and eventually convinces her to move back. John's accident had been fatal, and Mira still struggles with the loss.

Rob Burns is also heartbroken, having been left by his fiancée a week before their wedding. He unhappily follows his ex Elizabeth on social media. Summoned to work, Rob is assigned to write a profile on Celine Dion and is warned that if he cannot write about her with sincerity, his job may be at risk.

After receiving a new corporate cell phone, Rob chats with his colleagues Lisa and Billy, who push him to start dating again, though he has grown cynical about love. At the same time, Mira opens a box given to her by John's parents, filled with his clothes and the engagement ring he never had the chance to give her. As a children's book author and illustrator, she is pressured by her publisher to deliver another upbeat book soon or risk an intern's dismissal and be forced to return her last advance.

Rob begins receiving intimate, emotional messages from an unknown woman on his new work phone. When he learns she has a blind date arranged through a dating app, he goes to the bar in hopes of identifying her. Believing he has spotted her, he watches her leave with her date, unaware that Mira soon throws the man out of the cab for being too sexually aggressive.

During his interview with Celine, she quickly senses Rob's cynicism about love. She asks probing questions until he opens up, encouraging him to follow his heart. Although he runs out of time for the interview, she urges him to return once he has worked through his doubts.

Interpreting one of the texts, Rob deduces that the sender will attend a specific opera at the Met. He decides to stay through multiple performances until he finds her. When he finally does, he introduces himself, learns her name is Mira Ray, and they exchange personal phone numbers.

Meeting for cheeseburgers another day, Rob and Mira discover more shared interests and talk through the night. The following evening, they cook dinner at her place. She falls asleep, and he stays on the sofa. In the morning, Mira panics when she finds Rob and Suzy getting along effortlessly.

Rob later finds Celine rehearsing, and she observes that he has changed. Mira reaches out again, and after playing basketball together, they spend the night at his place. The next morning, she sees her texts to John displayed on Rob's computer and feels betrayed, telling him never to contact her again.

Instead of writing the assigned profile on Celine, Rob writes about how she and her music inspired him to pursue love, which he found with Mira. He declares that she has transformed him and pleads for a second chance, asking her to meet him where he first began to feel hopeful again. His boss publicly reprimands him for ignoring the assignment but privately praises the piece and promises him a podcast.

Rob eventually finds Mira somewhere between the Met and Central Park. After he agrees to several promises, they reconcile and share a kiss.

== Cast ==
- Priyanka Chopra as Mira Ray
- Sam Heughan as Rob Burns
- Celine Dion as Herself
- Sofia Barclay as Suzy Ray
- Russell Tovey as Billy Brooks
- Lydia West as Lisa Scott
- Steve Oram as Richard Hughes
- Omid Djalili as Mohsen
- Nick Jonas as Joel
- Celia Imrie as Gina Valentine
- Arinzé Kene as John

== Production ==
In April 2019, it was announced that James C. Strouse would write and direct the film, then titled Text for You, an English-language remake of the German film SMS für Dich, with Screen Gems set to produce. In October 2020, Priyanka Chopra Jonas, Sam Heughan, and Celine Dion joined the cast. In November 2020, Russell Tovey, Steve Oram, Omid Djalili, Sofia Barclay, Lydia West, Arinzé Kene, and Celia Imrie were added to the cast.

Principal photography began in October 2020 and concluded in early 2021. Filming started in London before production moved to the United States.

In April 2022, the film was retitled It's All Coming Back to Me, after the song "It's All Coming Back to Me Now", which Dion recorded for her 1996 album Falling into You. In November 2022, the title was changed again to Love Again.

== Music ==
The Love Again soundtrack was released on May 12, 2023. It includes five new songs by Celine Dion and six of her earlier hits. The first song, "Love Again", was issued on April 13, 2023. The second track, "I'll Be", followed on May 5, 2023.

== Release ==
The film was released theatrically in the United States on May 5, 2023. It had previously been scheduled for February 10, 2023, before being moved to May 12, 2023, by Sony Pictures Releasing.

Warner Bros. Pictures released the film in Germany, Austria and Switzerland on July 6, 2023.

The film was released digitally on May 23, with a Blu-ray and DVD release scheduled for July 18.

== Reception ==
=== Box office ===
Love Again grossed $6.2 million in the United States and Canada, and $6.5 million in other territories, for a worldwide total of $12.7 million.

In the United States and Canada, Love Again was released alongside Guardians of the Galaxy Vol. 3 and was projected to earn around $5 million from 2,650 theaters in its opening weekend. The film made $1.2 million on its first day, including $240,000 from Thursday night previews. It went on to debut with $2.4 million, placing fifth at the box office.

=== Critical response ===
On the review aggregator website Rotten Tomatoes, 30% of 47 critics' reviews are positive, with an average rating of 3.2/10. The website's consensus reads: "Love Again? After watching this treacly romance, you're likely to come away thinking once was more than enough." Metacritic, which uses a weighted average, assigned the film a score of 32 out of 100, based on 12 critics, indicating "generally unfavorable" reviews. Audiences surveyed by CinemaScore gave the film an average grade of "B" on an A+ to F scale, while PostTrak reported that female audience members, who made up 75% of the opening weekend, gave it an 81% overall positive score, with 57% saying they would definitely recommend the film.
