= Love Again (Celine Dion song) =

Promotional single by Celine Dion

from the album Love Again
- Released: 13 April 2023
- Studio: Ballroom West (Los Angeles); Bedford (Brooklyn); Creation Audio (Minneapolis); MixStar (Virginia Beach)
- Genre: Pop
- Length: 3:32
- Label: Columbia
- Songwriters: Dan Wilson; Rosaileen Scher
- Producers: Dan Wilson; Sara Mulford

Lyric video
- "Love Again" on YouTube

"Love Again" is a song by Canadian singer Celine Dion from the soundtrack album Love Again (2023). Written by Dan Wilson and Rosaileen Scher and produced by Wilson with additional production by Sara Mulford, the track was released as a promotional single on 13 April 2023. It received positive reviews from music critics and entered several sales charts, reaching number two in Quebec, number 10 in Canada, and number 86 in the United Kingdom. It also peaked at number two on the Quebec airplay chart. On 21 June 2024, "Love Again" was included on the I Am: Celine Dion soundtrack, where it topped the sales chart in Quebec.

== Background and release ==
After releasing Courage in 2019 and beginning the Courage World Tour, Dion joined the cast of the American romantic comedy-drama film Love Again, directed by James C. Strouse. Filming began in October 2020 and concluded in early 2021.

On 13 April 2023, Dion released "Love Again", her first new music in four years and her first since revealing in December 2022 that she had been diagnosed with stiff-person syndrome. The song was written by Dan Wilson and Rosaileen Scher (known professionally as Rosie) and produced by Wilson with additional production by Mulford. Wilson had previously co-written and co-produced "Lovers Never Die" for Dion's 2019 album Courage.

The Love Again soundtrack, which includes 11 songs by Dion, five of them new, was released on 12 May 2023. On 21 June 2024, "Love Again" was added to the I Am: Celine Dion soundtrack.

== Critical reception ==
Gil Kaufman of Billboard described "Love Again" as a moving ballad built around gentle piano and acoustic guitar, praising Dion's emotional delivery. Nardine Saad of the Los Angeles Times called it a sweet piano ballad about overcoming grief.

== Commercial performance ==
In April 2023, "Love Again" debuted and peaked at number two on both Quebec charts: Song Sales and Radio Songs. It also reached number 10 on the Canadian Digital Song Sales chart. In the United Kingdom, it peaked at number 86 on the UK Singles Downloads Chart. After being included on the I Am: Celine Dion soundtrack in June 2024, the song topped the Quebec sales chart.

== Music video ==
The lyric video, which includes scenes from the film, was released on YouTube on 13 April 2023.

== Credits and personnel ==
=== Recording ===
- Recorded at Ballroom Studios West and Bedford Studio; strings recorded at Creation Audio (Minneapolis)
- Mixed at MixStar Studios (Virginia Beach)

=== Personnel ===
- Celine Dion – lead vocals
- Dan Wilson – producer, composer, lyricist, synth
- Rosaileen Scher – composer, lyricist, guitar, piano, background vocals, recording engineer
- Sara Mulford – additional producer, piano, synth strings, celeste, toms, recording engineer
- Daniel Ficca – percussion/FX, 808, synth strings
- Charlie Block – bass
- Serban Ghenea – mixing engineer
- Bryce Bordone – assistant mix engineer
- Kate Bennett – violin
- Erika Hoogeveen – violin
- Mary Alice Hutton – violin
- Natsuki Kumagai – violin
- Sophia Mockler – violin
- Huldah Niles – violin
- Conor O'Brien – violin
- Renata Steve – violin
- Sam Bergman – viola
- Coca Bochonko – viola
- Valerie Little – viola
- Dan Lawonn – strings contractor, cello
- Roth Marshall – cello
- Kirsten Whitson – cello
- Andy Thomson – conductor
- Scott Malchow – strings recording engineer
- Steven Wiese – strings recording engineer

== Charts ==
Chart performance
Chart (2023–2024)	Peak position
Canada Digital Song Sales (Billboard)	10
Quebec Digital Song Sales (ADISQ)	1
Quebec Radio Songs (ADISQ)	2
UK Singles Downloads (OCC)	86

== Release history ==
Release history
Region	Date	Format	Label	Ref.
Various	13 April 2023	Digital download; streaming	Columbia	
United Kingdom	20 May 2023	Adult contemporary radio	Columbia	
