= Push Baby =

British pop duo

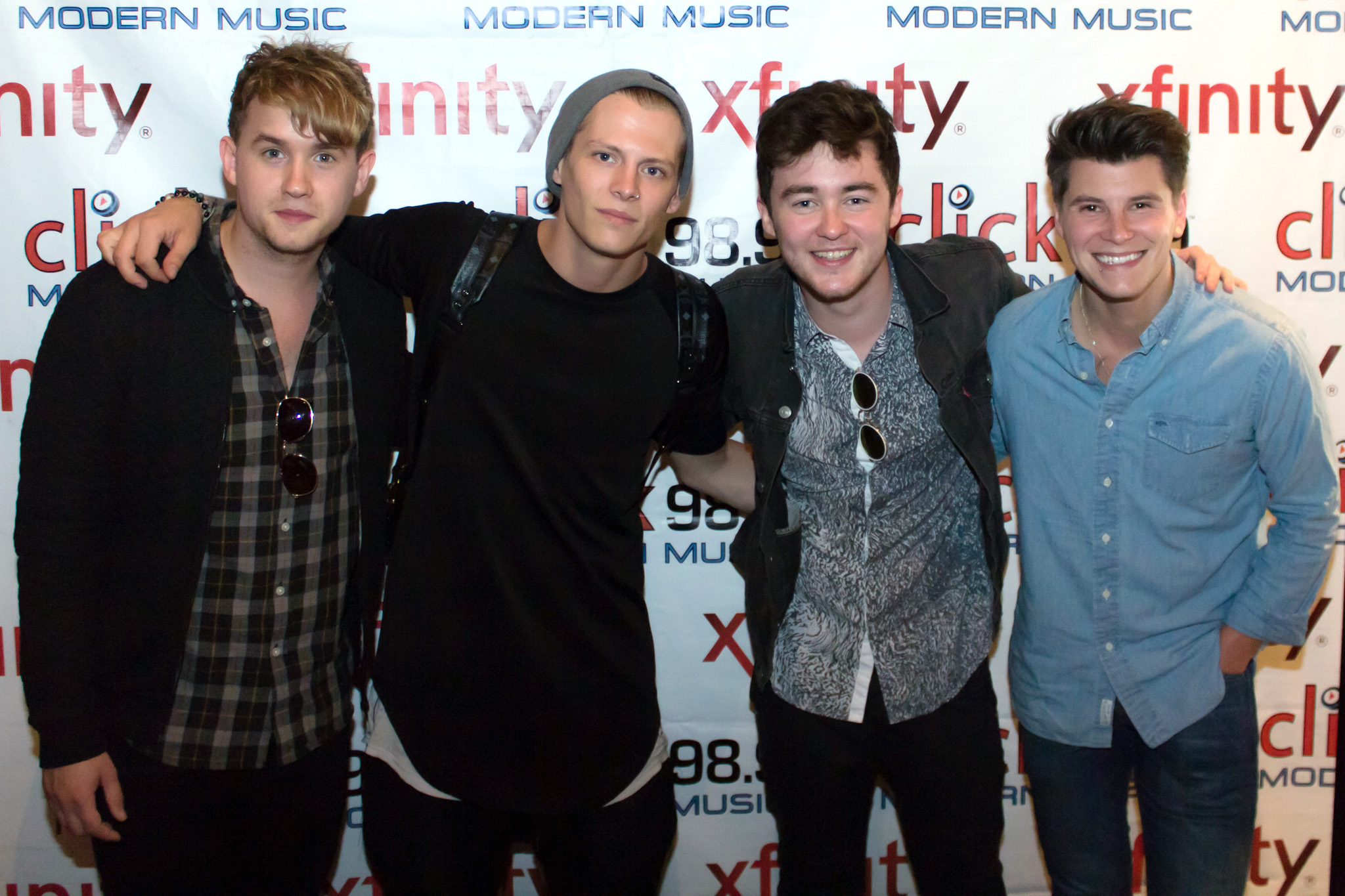
- Rixton at the Click 98.9 New Artist Showcase, August 2014. From left to right: Danny Wilkin, Lewi Morgan, Jake Roche and Charley Bagnall.

Background information
- Also known as: Relics (2012–2013); Rixton (2013–2019)
- Origin: Manchester, England
- Genres: Pop; pop rock; alternative rock
- Years active: 2012–2016, 2019–2022 (Note: The group was on hiatus from 2016–2019, and is currently on another hiatus.)
- Labels: School Boy; Interscope; Giant Little Man; Mad Love; Republic; Wow, Big Legend
- Members: Jake Roche; Charley Bagnall
- Past members: Danny Wilkin; Lewi Morgan
- Website: wowbiglegend.com

Push Baby (stylised in all lowercase) are a British pop duo from Manchester, England consisting of singer Jake Roche and multi-instrumentalist Charley Bagnall. They are signed to their own indie label, Wow, Big Legend.

In 2012, the band started as a four-piece band called Relics and then became known as the band Rixton from 2013 to 2019. Their debut single as Rixton, "Me and My Broken Heart" charted internationally and got to number one in the UK singles chart. Rixton went on a hiatus in 2016 and got back together as Push Baby in 2019 with the release of their debut song under the new name, "Mama's House". They then released the Woah EP and the studio albums Wow, Big Legend and Wow, That's What I Call Push Baby! before going into another hiatus in 2022.

== Career ==
=== 2012-2013: Early beginnings and Relics era ===
Jake Roche (son of actor Shane Richie and former The Nolans member Coleen Nolan) and former Push Baby member Danny Wilkin started writing together after they left school. They were later joined by Charley Bagnall through mutual friends and finally Lewi Morgan was the last addition to the band after meeting Roche through a girl he was seeing at the time. The band was originally called Relics and their initial fame was through cover releases posted on YouTube; in an interview with Metro, Roche divulged that they had performed a number of covers of songs – "stuff like "Ignition" and "Thong Song"" and then decided to do "a more personality driven cover".

Roche had heard The Nolans – of which his mother was a member – performing "Have Yourself a Merry Little Christmas" when he was four and suggested that the band cover it. For this performance, they wore "elf ears" and created what Roche called "more of a comedy sketch". Scooter Braun saw this and offered to sign the band. Soon after being signed by Braun, the band flew to New York City in August 2013 to record their EP, Me and My Broken Heart, and Let the Road, their debut album with producer Benny Blanco.

=== 2013–2019: Rixton era, Let the Road, and first hiatus ===
The band later changed their name to Rixton and they attracted attention with "Make Out", a song that involved the members lampooning famous 2013 music videos such as "Stay" by Rihanna, "Wrecking Ball" by Miley Cyrus, "Roar" by Katy Perry, "Applause" by Lady Gaga, "Blurred Lines" by Robin Thicke and "Beauty and a Beat" by Justin Bieber. The video was released on 22 October 2013 but it was never released as an official single. The band's debut single, "Me and My Broken Heart", was released to radio on 11 March 2014 and made its premiere on KIIS FM in Los Angeles during one of JoJo Wright's shows. It debuted at number 1 in the UK and also charted in Australia, Sweden and the United States. "Me and My Broken Heart" went Gold on 27 May 2014 and Rixton were awarded their first Gold plaque two days later in New York City. Their first extended play, also titled Me and My Broken Heart followed on 18 March 2014.

An album was announced for release through School Boy, Giant Little Man, Mad Love and Interscope Records later in 2014. Justin Bieber joined the group on stage at the SXSW Festival on 10 March 2014. They are also lined up in mid-2014 to play summer festivals across the United States and United Kingdom before returning to North America to embark on their debut tour, The Broken Heart Tour, playing in 12 US and Canadian cities. This was followed shortly after by a UK tour in November 2014. In addition, they played a pop up gig in New York which required police attendance to control the crowds. They opened for Ariana Grande on The Honeymoon Tour during the North American dates and also in Sweden. The debut album Let the Road was released on 8 March 2015. It peaked at number 19 on the UK Albums Chart. After 2016 the band went on a hiatus until March 2019.

=== 2019–2022: Push Baby era, Wow, Big Legend, and second hiatus ===
In March 2019, after a four-year hiatus, the band announced on their YouTube channel that they were retiring the Rixton band name and rebranding themselves as Push Baby. They have since signed to Republic Records. The band released their first song under the new Push Baby band name after the hiatus, "Mama's House" on 5 April 2019. They released the EP Woah on 27 September 2019.

In 2020, Wilkin decided to leave the band as he wanted to focus on his solo career. On 14 August 2020, Push Baby announced a new record label, "Wow, Big Legend", and released their new single "Holding on Is Holding You Back" without Wilkin. The same day, they made an announcement on their Tumblr page to let fans know that Morgan also was no longer a part of the band as he wanted to focus on his career as a tattoo artist. Four days later, they released their new single, "Wishing We Were More Than Friends". On 18 June 2021 they released their second studio album (and first under the name Push Baby), Wow, Big Legend.

The band released their third studio album (and second under the name Push Baby), Wow, That's What I Call Push Baby! on 21 October 2022, with the lead single from the album, "Lose It! Lose It!" having been released on 3 December 2021.

On 15 November 2022, Roche and Bagnall announced that they would be taking a break from Push Baby to pursue other projects.

== Members ==
Current members

- Jake Roche – lead vocals, rhythm guitar (2012–present)
- Charley Bagnall – lead guitar, backing vocals (2012–present), bass guitar, keyboards, drums, percussion (2020–present)

Former members

- Danny Wilkin – bass guitar, keyboards, backing vocals (2012–2020)
- Lewi Morgan – drums, percussion, backing vocals (2012–2020)

Touring members

- Amanda Steele – bass guitar, backing vocals (2022)
- Kevin Edison – drums, percussion (2022)
- Heather Jamison – keyboards, backing vocals (2022)

Timeline

== Discography ==
Studio albums

- Let the Road (2015), as Rixton
- Wow, Big Legend (2021), as Push Baby
- Wow, That's What I Call Push Baby! (2022), as Push Baby

Extended plays

- Me and My Broken Heart (2014), as Rixton
- Woah (2019), as Push Baby

== Awards and nominations ==
Year	Nominated	Award	Result
2014	Rixton	Teen Choice Award for Choice Music Group	Nominated
2014	"Me and My Broken Heart"	Teen Choice Award for Choice Single Group	Nominated
2014	Rixton	Teen Choice Award for Choice Music: Breakout Group	Nominated
2014	Rixton	Teen Choice Award for Choice Summer Music Star: Group	Nominated
2015	Rixton	Kids' Choice Award for UK Fave Breakthrough	Won

== Tour ==
Main act:

- Me and My Broken Heart Tour (2014)

Support act:

- The Honeymoon Tour (2015) – with Ariana Grande
- X Tour (2015) – with Ed Sheeran
- Demi World Tour (2015) – with Demi Lovato

== Filmography ==
- 2014: The Haunted Hathaways as themselves
- 2015: Friday Download as themselves
