= Courage (Celine Dion album) =

Studio album by Celine Dion
- Released: 15 November 2019
- Recorded: 2017–2019
- Studios: AIR, departure lounge at Heathrow Airport, Eg's, Metropolis (London); Ballroom West, Big Tree, Capitol, Echo, MXM, Rocket Carousel, The Synagogue, Troy House (Los Angeles); Castle Recording (Franklin); Chateau Marouatte (Grand-Brassac); i Borgen (Partille); Maison de Musique (Santa Monica); Newman Scoring Stage (Century City); Penthouse (Lidingö); Piccolo (Montreal); Power Sound (Amsterdam); Skylar Grey (St. Helena); The Stellar House (Venice); At the Palms (Las Vegas)
- Genres: Pop; EDM
- Length: 57:00
- Label: Columbia
- Producers: 9AM; Johan Carlsson; John Doelp; The Elev3n; Jörgen Elofsson; David Guetta; Hybrid; DallasK; Greg Kurstin; Jon Levine; Craig McConnell; Stephan Moccio; Jimmy Napes; Denis Savage; StarGate; The Stereotypes; Giorgio Tuinfort; Ugly Babies; Andrew Wells; Greg Wells; Eg White; Dan Wilson; Max Wolfgang

Celine Dion chronology
| The Best So Far... 2018 Tour Edition (2018) | Courage (2019) | Love Again (2023) |

Singles from Courage
- 1. "Imperfections" Released: 18 September 2019; 2. "Lying Down" Released: 18 September 2019; 3. "Courage" Released: 18 September 2019

Courage is the twenty-seventh studio album and twelfth English-language album by Canadian singer Celine Dion. Released by Columbia Records on 15 November 2019, it was created with a diverse group of writers and producers, including Sia, Sam Smith, David Guetta, Lauv, LP, Greg Kurstin, StarGate, Jimmy Napes, Jörgen Elofsson, Stephan Moccio, Eg White, and Liz Rodrigues of The New Royales.

The album marked Dion's return to the studio following the end of her Las Vegas residency, Celine, in June 2019. She released "Flying on My Own" as a gift to fans shortly afterward, and in September 2019 launched the Courage World Tour, where she premiered three additional songs: "Imperfections", "Lying Down", and "Courage". Courage includes 16 tracks, with four more on the deluxe edition, and received generally favourable reviews from music critics.

The album debuted atop the US Billboard 200, becoming Dion's first number-one album there in 17 years. It also entered at number one in Canada, Belgium, and Switzerland, and reached the top 10 in numerous other countries, including number two in the United Kingdom, France, and Australia, number four in Germany, Austria, and Croatia, and number five in Ireland, New Zealand, and Portugal.

== Background and development ==
In November 2013, Dion released her previous English-language studio album, Loved Me Back to Life. The following month, her husband René Angélil was diagnosed with throat cancer and underwent surgery. In June 2014, Angélil stepped down as Dion's manager to focus on his health, and in August 2014 Dion postponed her show business activities because of the worsening of her husband's condition. Angélil died on 14 January 2016.

On 22 May 2016, in her first public performance outside The Colosseum at Caesars Palace, Dion performed "The Show Must Go On" during the 2016 Billboard Music Awards, where she received the Billboard Icon Award. In August 2016, she released her French-language album Encore un soir, which received critical and commercial success. The following month, she premiered "Recovering", a song written by Pink in honor of her late husband. The song was marketed as the first track from her upcoming English-language album, which at the time was projected for release in 2017. She performed it during the Stand Up to Cancer Live Event on 9 September 2016. In March 2017, Dion's "How Does a Moment Last Forever" was released on the Beauty and the Beast: Original Motion Picture Soundtrack. She also embarked on two summer tours in Canada and Europe in 2016 and 2017.

In 2018, she released "Ashes" from the American superhero film Deadpool 2, and toured Asia, Australia, and New Zealand. In September 2018, she announced the end of her Las Vegas residency Celine, with the final date set for 8 June 2019.

On 3 April 2019, Dion announced the 2019–2020 Courage World Tour, beginning in Quebec City, Canada, on 18 September 2019. She also announced a new English-language album of the same name, scheduled for release in November 2019. Explaining the album's title, she said: "I think I went through a lot. And life had given me the tools... to find my inner strength, to find courage, and to keep going. The people that I love so much embraced the moments that were difficult. They gave me so much strength. And then a song came that was called 'Courage', and it didn't take long for all of us to say, 'I think the album should be called Courage'".

Dion announced the tour in a video titled "Ciao for now Las Vegas", in which she leaves Las Vegas in a car full of drag queens. Impersonator Steven Wayne appeared as Dion, alongside Bryan Watkins, Crystal Woods, and Hot Chocolate as Barbra Streisand, Diana Ross, and Tina Turner. The promo also teased the new song "Flying on My Own". On 5 April 2019, on Jimmy Kimmel Live!, Dion promoted her upcoming tour, sang a few lines from the song "Courage", and performed "Ashes". On 7 and 8 June 2019, she performed "Flying on My Own" during her Las Vegas residency show, and the live performance was released to streaming platforms on 8 June 2019.

== Writing and recording ==
In April 2019, Dion revealed that she had received 48 potential songs for the upcoming album and needed to choose 12 of them. The new album, Courage, would explore new musical directions while also maintaining the familiar style associated with Dion. After releasing the Pink-written song "Recovering" in September 2016, Dion recorded new material in October 2016 with Diane Warren, who wrote many of her hits, including "Because You Loved Me". In April 2017, Dion mentioned that Sia had written three songs for her. In April 2019, it was announced that the new album would include a contribution by Sia, and that one of her songs was titled "Baby".

In December 2017, Dion revealed that she had recorded new music with Stephan Moccio and Maty Noyes. Moccio wrote Dion's 2002 single "A New Day Has Come", and also co-wrote hits for other artists, including "Earned It" by The Weeknd and "Wrecking Ball" by Miley Cyrus. Also in December 2017, Dion recorded the song "Flying on My Own" at the Studio at the Palms in Las Vegas. The track was written by Jörgen Elofsson, Anton Mårtenson, and Liz Rodrigues. In October 2018, David Guetta mentioned that Dion had recorded a song he co-wrote with Sia.

While announcing the Courage World Tour in April 2019, Dion revealed that she had recorded a song titled "Courage", which became the album's title track, scheduled for release in November 2019. The promotional video for the tour includes a fragment of the new song "Flying on My Own". On 20 May 2019, a fragment of another new song, "Lying Down", written by David Guetta and Sia, appeared in Dion's episode of Carpool Karaoke with James Corden. "Flying on My Own" (Live from Las Vegas) was released as a digital download on 9 June 2019, the day after Dion ended her 16-year Las Vegas residency. The studio version followed on 28 June 2019. On 18 September 2019, Dion released three new songs — "Lying Down", "Courage", and "Imperfections" — revealed the album's cover art, and announced the release date of 15 November 2019.

== Critical reception ==
Professional ratings
Aggregate scores
| Source | Rating |
|---|---|
| AnyDecentMusic? | 6.2/10 |
| Metacritic | 68/100 |
Review scores
| Source | Rating |
| AllMusic | 4/5 stars |
| The Guardian | 3/5 stars |
| Idolator | 4.5/5 stars |
| The Independent | 3/5 stars |
| The Line of Best Fit | 5/10 |
| MusicOMH | 4/5 stars |
| The Observer | 3/5 stars |
| Rolling Stone | 3.5/5 stars |
| Slant Magazine | 2.5/5 stars |
| US Weekly | 3/4 stars |

Courage received generally positive reviews from music critics. At Metacritic, which assigns a normalised rating out of 100 to reviews from mainstream publications, the album holds an average score of 68 based on nine reviews, indicating "generally favorable reviews". Mike Wass of Idolator gave the album 4.5 out of 5 stars, describing it as one of Dion's most eclectic works, particularly notable at this stage in her career. He wrote that although the production is inventive, the themes remain traditional, with Dion exploring matters of the heart. Neil Z. Yeung of AllMusic also awarded the album 4 out of 5 stars, calling Courage a transformative and cathartic release that guides listeners through Dion's process of healing and renewal. He added that the album includes a substantial number of mid-tempo songs that function as emotional reflections for both Dion and her audience. Nick Smith of MusicOMH likewise rated the album 4 out of 5 stars, noting its coherent themes of inner strength, courage, and self-reflection, and describing Courage as an impressive return.

Brittany Spanos of Rolling Stone praised the album's contemporary dance-pop tracks and its ballads, writing that the dance-pop moments are most effective when they include a touch of camp, allowing Dion's performance skills to stand out. She also stated that the ballads, showcasing Dion's multi-octave mezzo-soprano, are among the album's strongest elements. In her summary, Spanos compared Courage to Cher's 1998 album Believe, suggesting that Courage similarly reintroduced Dion to a new generation. Alexis Petridis of The Guardian wrote that the album's strongest tracks are its ballads, which remain close to the style that made Dion famous, including the title track. Alexandra Pollard of The Independent observed that the album's most affecting moments address the loss of a loved one, particularly in "For the Lover That I Lost", co-written by Sam Smith, and "Courage". Michael Cragg of The Observer noted that the album, recorded after the death of Dion's husband in 2016, is filled with lyrics about loss and renewal.

Jason Lipshutz of Billboard wrote that while Dion's 2013 album Loved Me Back to Life was a strong effort, Courage is even more vital, praising the "propulsive" opener "Flying on My Own", the "devastating" title track, and several reflective songs throughout. He added that the album's focus on loss, recovery, and personal empowerment makes it one of the most mature pop releases of 2019. Billboard staff later included Courage on their list of the best albums of 2019. In a more mixed review for Variety, A. D. Amorosi wrote that the album's most compelling moments address bereavement, fear, and finality in Dion's distinctive vocal style. He criticised several tracks, including "Flying on My Own", "Lovers Never Die", and "The Chase", arguing that they make Dion sound "robotic and dull". He concluded that Courage may represent Dion experimenting beyond her usual style, but cautioned against making such an approach habitual. The Cavalier Daily published a positive review, calling Courage Dion's best work to date and naming "Falling in Love Again" and "How Did You Get Here" as standout tracks.

== Year-end rankings and accolades ==
=== Year-end rankings ===
Numerous publications listed Courage as one of the best pop albums of 2019. AllMusic included it among their Favorite Pop Albums of 2019, describing the record as a "cathartic comeback". Billboard ranked Courage as the 50th best album of the year, writing that "Celine both digs deep, and lets us see her lighter side -- and that's the power of Dion". Idolator placed the album at No. 20 on their list of The Best Pop Albums of 2019, calling it her "best album since the 90s". Slate also listed Courage among the best albums of 2019. Billboard also ranked four songs from the album in their Top 10 Fan-favourite Songs of 2019 list. "Imperfections" topped the list at No. 1, while "Courage" (No. 4), "Flying on My Own" (No. 6), and "Lying Down" (No. 9) also appeared.

| Publication | Accolade | Rank | Ref. |
|---|---|---|---|
| AllMusic | Favorite Pop Albums of 2019 | included | |
| Billboard | The 50 Best Albums of 2019 | 50 | |
| Billboard | Readers Top 10 Best Albums of 2019 | 2 | |
| Idolator | The 20 Best Pop Albums of 2019 | 20 | |
| Slate | The Best Albums of 2019 | included | |

=== Accolades ===
The album received two Juno Award nominations at the Juno Awards of 2021, for Album of the Year and Adult Contemporary Album of the Year. Owing to Courage, Dion was also nominated for Juno Award for Artist of the Year. The album won a Webby Award in the Experimental & Innovation Social category.

== Singles ==
In June 2019, Dion released "Flying on My Own" as a gift to fans. The song reached number one in Quebec and entered the top 10 on the digital charts in Canada and France, as well as on the US Dance Club Songs chart. On 18 September 2019, Dion released three additional songs: "Imperfections", "Lying Down", and "Courage". The music video for "Imperfections" premiered on 26 September 2019, and the song was sent to radio on 30 September 2019. On 19 October 2019, "Lying Down" was added to the A-list on the BBC Radio 2 airplay playlist in the United Kingdom and was named record of the week. The music video for "Courage" premiered on 13 November 2019. "Soul" was sent to Italian radio on 24 January 2020 as the album's fourth promotional single and later became available worldwide on streaming platforms after previously being exclusive to Japan as the album's Japanese bonus track. "Change My Mind" was released as the album's third promotional single in the United Kingdom on 15 February 2020 and was added to the BBC Radio 2 B-List the same day.

== Commercial performance ==
Courage was a commercial success and broke several chart records around the world. It became the best-selling album of 2019 in Canada, and the seventh best-selling album by a female artist in the United States in 2020 in terms of pure sales. According to the IFPI, Courage sold 600,000 units worldwide, becoming the 20th best-selling album of 2019.

=== Canada ===
Courage debuted atop the Canadian Albums Chart with 55,000 album-equivalent units, including 53,000 pure album sales, becoming Dion's 15th number-one album in the Nielsen SoundScan era and 16th overall in Canada. It achieved the highest one-week consumption total since Drake's Scorpion earned 70,000 units in July 2018, and the highest one-week pure album sales since Taylor Swift's Reputation sold 80,000 copies in November 2017. It also achieved 2019's biggest single-week consumption total. Courage also debuted at number one in Quebec with 28,000 pure album sales. In its second week, the album dropped to number two in Canada, earning the second-highest sales total of the week with 8,300 units. In the third week, Courage fell to number three but achieved the highest album sales total for the week with 6,300 copies sold. In Quebec, it remained at number one for six non-consecutive weeks. Courage sold 93,000 copies in Canada in 2019. On the Canadian Nielsen SoundScan 2019 year-end charts, it was the top-selling album (physical and digital). It was certified platinum in Canada in January 2021.

=== United States ===
Courage debuted at number one on the US Billboard 200 dated 30 November 2019, becoming Dion's first US number-one album in 17 years, following A New Day Has Come (2002). It was her fifth US number-one album and earned 113,000 album-equivalent units, including 109,000 pure album sales. It also became her 13th top-10 album on the Billboard 200. With Courage, Dion achieved number-one albums in each of the last three decades, becoming the fourth woman to do so after Janet Jackson, Barbra Streisand, and Britney Spears. The following week, due to low streaming numbers, Courage fell to number 111, setting at the time a Billboard 200 record for the largest second-week drop for an album that debuted at number one, and the second-largest drop overall after Bon Jovi's This House Is Not for Sale (1–169). On Billboard's Top Current Albums chart, Courage fell from number one to number 13 in its second week, and on the Top Album Sales chart it dropped from number one to number 21.

=== United Kingdom ===
In the United Kingdom, the album debuted at number two with 18,946 copies sold. Courage is Dion's highest-charting album in the UK since A New Day Has Come became her fifth number one in 2002. In its second week, it fell to number 13 with 8,804 copies sold. On 27 December 2019, it was certified silver in the UK.

=== France ===
In France, Courage debuted at number two on the Overall Sales and Streaming Chart, and at number one on the Sales Chart with 24,000 pure album sales. In its second week, it fell to number seven on the Overall Chart and number five on the Sales Chart, selling 10,800 physical and digital copies. On 6 December 2019, Courage was certified gold by the SNEP. In 2019, the album sold 77,000 copies in France. In December 2022, it was certified platinum for sales exceeding 100,000 copies.

=== Other markets ===
Courage also debuted at number one in Belgium's Wallonia and Switzerland (including Romandy), number two in Australia and Scotland, number three in Belgium's Flanders, number four in Germany, Austria, and Croatia, number five in Ireland, New Zealand, Portugal, and on the Finnish Physical Albums Chart (number 13 on the Overall Chart), number six in Poland, number 10 in the Netherlands, Italy, and South Africa, and charted outside the top 10 in several other countries. In Japan, Courage debuted at number eight on the Western Oricon Albums Chart and number 49 on the Oricon Albums Chart. On the Billboard Japan charts, it entered the Top Albums Sales chart at number 41 and the Hot Albums chart at number 61.

== Track listing ==
Standard edition
| No. | Title | Writer(s) | Producer(s) | Length |
|---|---|---|---|---|
| 1. | "Flying on My Own" | Jörgen Elofsson; Liz Rodrigues; Anton "Hybrid" Mårtensson | Elofsson; Hybrid; Ugly Babies | 3:31 |
| 2. | "Lovers Never Die" | Johan Carlsson; Ross Golan; Dan Wilson | Carlsson; Wilson; John Sinclair^{[a]}; Brian Brundage^{[a]} | 2:51 |
| 3. | "Falling in Love Again" | Skylar Grey; Elliott Taylor | John Doelp; Denis Savage | 3:51 |
| 4. | "Lying Down" | David Guetta; Giorgio Tuinfort; Sia Furler | Guetta; Tuinfort | 3:58 |
| 5. | "Courage" | Stephan Moccio; Erik Alcock; Rodrigues | Moccio; TommyD^{[b]} | 4:14 |
| 6. | "Imperfections" | Ari Leff; Michael Pollack; Nicholas Perloff-Giles; Dallas Koehlke | DallasK | 3:59 |
| 7. | "Change My Mind" | Björn Yttling; LP; Jon Levine | Levine | 3:01 |
| 8. | "Say Yes" | Elofsson; Rodrigues | Elofsson | 3:32 |
| 9. | "Nobody's Watching" | Elofsson; Rodrigues | Elofsson; Hybrid | 3:12 |
| 10. | "The Chase" | Craig McConnell; Jessica Mitchell; Rodrigues | McConnell | 3:49 |
| 11. | "For the Lover That I Lost" | Sam Smith; Mikkel Eriksen; Tor Hermansen; James Napier | StarGate; Jimmy Napes | 2:54 |
| 12. | "Baby" | Furler; Greg Kurstin; Maureen "Mozella" McDonald | Kurstin | 3:34 |
| 13. | "I Will Be Stronger" | Francis "Eg" White | White | 3:27 |
| 14. | "How Did You Get Here" | Nikki Grier; The Stereotypes; 9AM; Alcock; Rodrigues; Khalil Abdul-Rahman Hazzard; Calum Armand Maurice Brockie | The Stereotypes; 9AM | 4:21 |
| 15. | "Look at Us Now" | Steph Jones; Brandon Treyshun Campbell; Andrew Wells | A. Wells | 3:18 |
| 16. | "Perfect Goodbye" | Max Wolfgang; Freddy Wexler; Corey Sanders | Wolfgang; Steve Aoki^{[a]} | 3:28 |
| Total length: | | | | 57:00 |

Deluxe edition
| No. | Title | Writer(s) | Producer(s) | Length |
|---|---|---|---|---|
| 17. | "Best of All" | Ben Earle; White | White | 3:23 |
| 18. | "Heart of Glass" | Furler; Kurstin | Kurstin | 3:32 |
| 19. | "Boundaries" | Moccio; Maty Noyes | Moccio | 3:23 |
| 20. | "The Hard Way" | Jessica Karpov; Whitney Phillips; Greg Wells | G. Wells | 3:24 |
| Total length: | | | | 70:42 |

Japanese edition
| No. | Title | Writer(s) | Producer(s) | Length |
|---|---|---|---|---|
| 21. | "Soul" | Tina Parol; Jason Wade; James G. Morales; Matt Morales; Dave Rodriguez | The Elev3n | 3:14 |
| Total length: | | | | 73:56 |

=== Notes ===
- ^{^a} signifies an additional producer
- ^{^b} signifies an orchestral session co-producer

== Charts ==
=== Weekly charts ===
Weekly chart performance
| Chart (2019–2020) | Peak position |
|---|---|
| Australian Albums (ARIA) | 2 |
| Austrian Albums (Ö3 Austria) | 4 |
| Belgian Albums (Ultratop Flanders) | 3 |
| Belgian Albums (Ultratop Wallonia) | 1 |
| Canadian Albums (Billboard) | 1 |
| Czech Albums (ČNS IFPI) | 11 |
| Croatian Foreign Albums (HDU) | 4 |
| Danish Albums (Hitlisten) | 23 |
| Dutch Albums (Album Top 100) | 10 |
| Finnish Albums (Suomen virallinen lista) | 13 |
| French Albums (SNEP) | 2 |
| German Albums (Offizielle Top 100) | 4 |
| Greek Albums (IFPI) | 14 |
| Hungarian Albums (MAHASZ) | 11 |
| Irish Albums (IRMA) | 5 |
| Italian Albums (FIMI) | 10 |
| Japanese Albums (Oricon) | 49 |
| Japanese International Albums (Oricon) | 8 |
| Japanese Hot Albums (Billboard Japan) | 61 |
| New Zealand Albums (RMNZ) | 5 |
| Norwegian Albums (VG-lista) | 16 |
| Polish Albums (ZPAV) | 6 |
| Portuguese Albums (AFP) | 5 |
| Quebec Albums (ADISQ) | 1 |
| Scottish Albums (Official Charts) | 2 |
| Slovak Albums (ČNS IFPI) | 53 |
| South African Albums (RISA) | 10 |
| Spanish Albums (Promusicae) | 11 |
| Swedish Albums (Sverigetopplistan) | 30 |
| Swiss Albums (Schweizer Hitparade) | 1 |
| Swiss Albums (Schweizer Hitparade Romandy) | 1 |
| UK Albums (Official Charts) | 2 |
| US Billboard 200 | 1 |

=== Year-end charts ===
2019 year-end chart performance
| Chart (2019) | Position |
|---|---|
| Belgian Albums (Ultratop Flanders) | 118 |
| Belgian Albums (Ultratop Wallonia) | 35 |
| Canadian Sales Albums (SoundScan) | 1 |
| French Albums (SNEP) | 53 |
| Swiss Albums (Schweizer Hitparade) | 65 |
| Worldwide Albums (IFPI) | 20 |

2020 year-end chart performance
| Chart (2020) | Position |
|---|---|
| Belgian Albums (Ultratop Wallonia) | 178 |
| Canadian Albums (Billboard) | 25 |
| US Top Album Sales (Billboard) | 28 |
| US Top Current Album Sales (Billboard) | 23 |

== Certifications and sales ==
Certifications
| Region | Certification | Certified units/sales |
|---|---|---|
| Canada (Music Canada) | Platinum | 80,000^{‡} |
| France (SNEP) | Platinum | 100,000^{‡} |
| United Kingdom (BPI) | Silver | 60,000^{‡} |
Summaries
| Worldwide | — | 600,000 |
^{‡} Sales+streaming figures based on certification alone.

== Release history ==
Release history
| Region | Date | Label | Format | Catalog |
|---|---|---|---|---|
| Various | 15 November 2019 | Columbia | CD; digital; streaming | 190759524824 (standard) |
| Various | 15 November 2019 | Columbia | CD; digital; streaming | 194397018127 (deluxe) |
| Japan | 27 November 2019 | SMEJ | Blu-spec CD2 | SICP-31334 |
| Various | 14 February 2020 | Columbia | Vinyl LP | 190759524817 |

== See also ==
- List of Billboard 200 number-one albums of 2019
- List of number-one albums of 2019 (Belgium)
- List of number-one albums of 2019 (Canada)
- List of number-one hits of 2019 (Switzerland)
