= Courage World Tour =

2019–2020 concert tour by Celine Dion

- Tour by Celine Dion
- Location: North America
- Associated album: Courage
- Start date: 18 September 2019
- End date: 8 March 2020
- No. of shows: 52
- Box office: $104 million

Celine Dion concert chronology
- Celine Dion Live 2018 (2018); Courage World Tour (2019–2020); Celine Dion Paris 2026–2027 (2026–2027)

Courage World Tour was the fifteenth concert tour by Canadian singer Celine Dion, staged in support of her English-language studio album Courage (2019). It marked her first world tour in more than a decade, following the Taking Chances World Tour. The tour began in Quebec City, Canada, on 18 September 2019 and concluded in Newark, New Jersey on 8 March 2020.

== Background ==
The tour was announced on 3 April 2019 at The Theatre at Ace Hotel in Downtown Los Angeles. The event was live streamed on Dion's Facebook page. Tickets went on sale to the general public on 12 April 2019. Following high pre-sale demand, additional shows were added in Quebec City, Ottawa, Montreal, Toronto, Boston, Miami, Brooklyn, and Newark.

On-site rehearsals were held at Videotron Centre in Quebec City starting in early September, with Dion and her team of 110 staying at the Le Capitole hotel for the duration of their time in the city. In September 2019, ConcertFrance announced that Dion would perform at the Paris La Défense Arena in Nanterre, France, on 26 June 2020. That same month, the first four shows in Montreal, scheduled to take place 26, 27, and 30 September, and 1 October 2019, were postponed due to a throat virus; the shows were rescheduled for 18, 19, 21, and 22 November. European dates, as well as additional dates in New York City, San Diego, Los Angeles, and Vancouver, were revealed by SoldOutTicketBox.com on 26 September 2019. In March 2020, Dion rescheduled two dates in Washington, D.C. and Pittsburgh due to the 'common cold,' despite reports linking the postponements to the COVID-19 pandemic in the United States. In 2020, Dion rescheduled the North American leg of the tour to 2021, due to the COVID-19 pandemic.

In February 2021, European and UK dates from 19 March to 16 June 2021 were rescheduled to recommence in May 2022, due to the COVID-19 pandemic in Europe. Subsequent European dates from 19 June to 25 July 2021 were rescheduled to recommence in May 2023.

In January 2022, Dion cancelled the remainder of the 2022 North American dates, citing 'ongoing recovery' from unspecified health issues. Three months later, Dion rescheduled all 2022 European dates for 2023, again citing ongoing recovery from health issues. In December 2022, Dion cancelled eight shows scheduled to take place from May to July 2023, while rescheduling 23 European dates, for February to April 2023, to March and April 2024, citing her diagnosis with stiff-person syndrome.

On 26 May 2023, it was announced the remaining European concerts were cancelled, citing Dion's ongoing recovery from stiff-person syndrome. In a statement, Dion said: "I'm so sorry to disappoint all of you once again... and even though it breaks my heart, it's best that we cancel everything until I'm really ready to be back on stage... I'm not giving up... and I can't wait to see you again!"

== Critical reception ==
The Courage World Tour received positive reviews. Billboard praised the setlist, noting the mix of older hits such as "Beauty and the Beast" with new songs like "Courage", as well as the "extraordinary" encore that included "My Heart Will Go On" and John Lennon's "Imagine". The magazine also commended Dion's vocals, her outfits, and the drone effects that created images of stars, water, and the Heart of the Ocean diamond during "My Heart Will Go On". Billboard described the two-hour concert as stunning and showstopping. The tour was also included on Billboard's list of the best live shows of 2019.

Variety gave a positive review of Dion's Brooklyn concert, writing that "she's still one of the best in the business. It's hard to overstate just how pitch-perfect Dion's singing is." The review added that it was surprising she had never been asked to perform at the Super Bowl halftime show, concluding: "After all these years as a powerhouse diva, she's still managing to top herself."

The Charlotte Observer praised her performance at Spectrum Center, stating: "There might not be a human being alive who can belt ballads with as much power and control and grace as Celine Dion." Courier Journal also gave a positive review of her first-ever Louisville show, writing: "Dion is in a league of her own. Her vocals were spot on all night and after she continued to hit note after incredible note over and over again, you were left wondering at some points 'is she even real?'".

== Commercial performance ==
According to figures reported to Billboard Boxscore, Dion topped the 30 November‑dated Hot Tours recap with $33.2 million from the tour's first 19 shows. She grossed $7 million from four shows at Montreal's Bell Centre, selling 53,864 tickets. The opening leg averaged $1.747 million and 12,414 tickets per show. These results increased Dion's career total to $1.115 billion and 8.8 million tickets sold, as reported to Billboard Boxscore.

Billboard named the tour the top pop tour of 2020, with $84.6 million grossed and 498,000 tickets sold. Dion also became the highest‑grossing female touring act of 2020 and the second overall, behind Elton John. The tour was the most successful music tour in North America during 2020, with $71.2 million in gross revenue.

In Paris, all general‑public tickets (200,000) for her six shows at Paris La Défense Arena sold out in just 90 minutes.

According to Pollstar, the Courage World Tour sold 646,346 tickets across 52 shows, with total revenue of $104 million as of March 2021.

== Set list ==
This set list is from the 18 September 2019 concert at Videotron Centre in Quebec City. It does not represent every concert.

1. "It's All Coming Back to Me Now"
2. "Dans un autre monde"
3. "Terre"
4. "À vous"
5. "I'm Alive"
6. "The Power of Love"
7. "L'amour existe encore"
8. "Beauty and the Beast"
9. "Encore un soir"
10. "You're the Voice"
11. "Regarde-moi"
12. "Un garçon pas comme les autres (Ziggy)"
13. "Courage"
14. "All by Myself"
15. "Lying Down"
16. "Tous les blues sont écrits pour toi"
17. "S'il suffisait d'aimer"
18. "Let's Dance" / "Another One Bites the Dust" / "Flying on My Own" / "Kiss" / "River Deep, Mountain High" / "Lady Marmalade"
19. "My Heart Will Go On"
20. "Pour que tu m'aimes encore"

=== Notes ===
- Beginning with the show in Cleveland, Dion added "That's the Way It Is", "If You Asked Me To", "Love Can Move Mountains", "The Prayer", "To Love You More", "The Reason", "Because You Loved Me", and "Imagine"; she removed "Dans un autre monde", "Terre", "À vous", "L'amour existe encore", "Encore un soir", "Regarde-moi", "Un garçon pas comme les autres (Ziggy)", "S'il suffisait d'aimer", "Pour que tu m'aimes encore", and "Flying on My Own".
- Beginning with the show in Montreal, Dion replaced "Lying Down" with "Imperfections".
- During the shows in Boston, Dion performed "Happy Xmas (War Is Over)" in place of "Imagine".
- During the first show in Miami, Dion performed "Over the Rainbow" in place of "Imagine" in tribute to her mother, who died earlier that day.
- During her second Montreal show on 19 February 2020, Dion invited Mathieu Lafontaine of the band Bleu Jeans Bleu onstage to perform the band's song "Coton ouaté" as a duet.

== Tour dates ==
List of 2019 concerts
Date (2019)	City	Country	Venue	Attendance	Revenue
18 September	Quebec City	Canada	Videotron Centre	39,930 / 39,930	$5,761,752
20 September	Quebec City	Canada	Videotron Centre	39,930 / 39,930	$5,761,752
21 September	Quebec City	Canada	Videotron Centre	39,930 / 39,930	$5,761,752
15 October	Ottawa	Canada	Canadian Tire Centre	24,205 / 24,205	$3,348,005
16 October	Ottawa	Canada	Canadian Tire Centre	24,205 / 24,205	$3,348,005
18 October	Cleveland	United States	Rocket Mortgage FieldHouse	13,199 / 13,199	$1,593,287
20 October	Columbus	United States	Schottenstein Center	10,751 / 10,751	$1,626,691
22 October	Louisville	United States	KFC Yum! Center	12,465 / 12,465	$1,531,237
24 October	Cincinnati	United States	U.S. Bank Arena	11,004 / 11,004	$1,492,937
26 October	St. Louis	United States	Enterprise Center	11,735 / 11,735	$1,591,985
28 October	Kansas City	United States	Sprint Center	11,838 / 11,838	$1,883,309
30 October	Fargo	United States	Fargodome	10,473 / 12,239	$1,174,539
1 November	Minneapolis	United States	Target Center	12,504 / 12,504	$1,992,180
3 November	Milwaukee	United States	Fiserv Forum	10,788 / 10,788	$1,921,244
5 November	Detroit	United States	Little Caesars Arena	13,112 / 13,112	$2,282,502
18 November (Note: The concerts of 18, 19, 21 and 22 November 2019 at the Bell Centre were originally scheduled to take place on 26, 27 and 30 September, and 1 October 2019, but were rescheduled, due to virus infection.)	Montreal	Canada	Bell Centre	53,864 / 53,864	$6,994,869
19 November	Montreal	Canada	Bell Centre	53,864 / 53,864	$6,994,869
21 November	Montreal	Canada	Bell Centre	53,864 / 53,864	$6,994,869
22 November	Montreal	Canada	Bell Centre	53,864 / 53,864	$6,994,869
1 December	Chicago	United States	United Center	13,685 / 13,685	$2,870,852
3 December	Indianapolis	United States	Bankers Life Fieldhouse	11,633 / 11,633	$1,630,450
5 December	Buffalo	United States	KeyBank Center	12,462 / 12,462	$1,746,480
7 December	Albany	United States	Times Union Center	10,487 / 10,487	$1,816,438
9 December	Toronto	Canada	Scotiabank Arena	26,831 / 26,831	$4,772,722
10 December	Toronto	Canada	Scotiabank Arena	26,831 / 26,831	$4,772,722
13 December	Boston	United States	TD Garden	24,661 / 24,661	$5,180,061
14 December	Boston	United States	TD Garden	24,661 / 24,661	$5,180,061

List of 2020 concerts
Date (2020)	City	Country	Venue	Attendance	Revenue
8 January	Jacksonville	United States	VyStar Veterans Memorial Arena	11,272 / 11,272	$1,912,510
11 January	Atlanta	United States	State Farm Arena	11,212 / 11,212	$2,323,672
13 January	Nashville	United States	Bridgestone Arena	13,023 / 13,023	$2,103,662
15 January	Tampa	United States	Amalie Arena	12,749 / 12,749	$2,254,145
17 January	Miami	United States	American Airlines Arena	24,763 / 24,763	$5,222,838
18 January	Miami	United States	American Airlines Arena	24,763 / 24,763	$5,222,838
21 January	Charlotte	United States	Spectrum Center	13,458 / 13,458	$2,161,228
30 January	San Antonio	United States	AT&T Center	13,645 / 13,645	$2,021,746
1 February	Houston	United States	Toyota Center	11,569 / 11,569	$2,127,052
3 February	Dallas	United States	American Airlines Center	12,634 / 12,634	$2,657,817
5 February	Tulsa	United States	BOK Center	11,004 / 11,004	$1,619,919
7 February	New Orleans	United States	Smoothie King Center	12,833 / 12,833	$2,278,207
9 February	Memphis	United States	FedExForum	11,452 / 11,452	$1,609,727
11 February	Raleigh	United States	PNC Arena	12,436 / 12,436	$2,150,963
18 February (Note: The concerts of 18 and 19 February 2020 at the Bell Centre were originally scheduled to take place on 4 and 5 October 2019, but were rescheduled, due to virus infection.)	Montreal	Canada	Bell Centre	28,257 / 28,257	$3,587,437
19 February	Montreal	Canada	Bell Centre	28,257 / 28,257	$3,587,437
22 February	Atlantic City	United States	Boardwalk Hall	11,252 / 11,252	$2,470,305
24 February	Baltimore	United States	Royal Farms Arena	11,181 / 11,181	$1,591,232
26 February	Philadelphia	United States	Wells Fargo Center	13,269 / 13,269	$2,011,920
28 February	Brooklyn	United States	Barclays Center	25,177 / 25,177	$5,115,713
29 February	Brooklyn	United States	Barclays Center	25,177 / 25,177	$5,115,713
3 March	Uniondale (Note: Labelled as Long Island in promotional material.)	United States	Nassau Veterans Memorial Coliseum	10,672 / 10,672	$1,985,445
5 March	Brooklyn	United States	Barclays Center	12,543 / 12,543	$1,875,568
7 March	Newark	United States	Prudential Center	23,529 / 23,529	$4,330,802
8 March	Newark	United States	Prudential Center	23,529 / 23,529	$4,330,802

=== Cancelled shows ===
List of cancelled concerts
Date	City	Country	Venue	Reason	Ref.
18 July 2020	Monte Carlo	Monaco	Place du Casino	COVID-19 pandemic	
31 July 2020	Beirut	Lebanon	Beirut Waterfront	Mutual agreement with Byblos International Festival	
19 June 2021	Tel Aviv	Israel	Bloomfield Stadium	Scheduling difficulties (reduced to one show)	
20 June 2021	Tel Aviv	Israel	Bloomfield Stadium	Scheduling difficulties (reduced to one show)	
9 March 2022	Denver	United States	Ball Arena	Personal health issues (Note: These shows were originally scheduled to take place in the spring and summer of 2020, but were postponed due to the COVID-19 pandemic in Europe and in North America.)	
11 March 2022	Salt Lake City	United States	Vivint Smart Home Arena	Personal health issues	
14 March 2022	Winnipeg	Canada	Canada Life Centre	Personal health issues	
17 March 2022	Saskatoon	Canada	SaskTel Centre	Personal health issues	
20 March 2022	Edmonton	Canada	Rogers Place	Personal health issues	
21 March 2022	Edmonton	Canada	Rogers Place	Personal health issues	
24 March 2022	Portland	United States	Moda Center	Personal health issues	
26 March 2022	Tacoma	United States	Tacoma Dome	Personal health issues	
28 March 2022	Vancouver	Canada	Rogers Arena	Personal health issues	
29 March 2022	Vancouver	Canada	Rogers Arena	Personal health issues	
1 April 2022	San Francisco	United States	Chase Center	Personal health issues	
3 April 2022	Oakland	United States	Oakland Arena	Personal health issues	
5 April 2022	San Diego	United States	Pechanga Arena	Personal health issues	
8 April 2022	Glendale	United States	Gila River Arena	Personal health issues	
10 April 2022	Sacramento	United States	Golden 1 Center	Personal health issues	
14 April 2022	Los Angeles	United States	Staples Center	Personal health issues	
15 April 2022	Los Angeles	United States	Staples Center	Personal health issues	
20 April 2022	Pittsburgh	United States	PPG Paints Arena	Personal health issues	
22 April 2022	Washington, D.C.	United States	Capital One Arena	Personal health issues	
31 May 2023 (Note: Due to scheduling difficulties, the second Tel Aviv show was cancelled.)	Tel Aviv	Israel	Bloomfield Stadium	Personal health issues	
3 June 2023	Nicosia	Cyprus	GSP Stadium	Personal health issues	
6 June 2023	Attard	Malta	Ta' Qali	Personal health issues	
9 June 2023	Athens	Greece	O.A.K.A.	Personal health issues	
11 June 2023	Bucharest	Romania	Arena Națională	Personal health issues	
13 July 2023 (Note: The concert of 13 July 2023 in Carhaix is part of the Vieilles Charrues Festival.)	Carhaix	France	Vieilles Charrues Festival	Personal health issues	
15 July 2023 (Note: The concert of 15 July 2023 in Lucca is part of the Lucca Summer Festival.)	Lucca	Italy	Mura Storiche	Personal health issues	
17 July 2023 (Note: The concert of 17 July 2023 in Nyon is part of the Paléo Festival.)	Nyon	Switzerland	Plaine de l'Asse	Personal health issues	
26 August 2023	Amsterdam	Netherlands	Ziggo Dome	Personal health issues	
27 August 2023	Amsterdam	Netherlands	Ziggo Dome	Personal health issues	
29 August 2023	Amsterdam	Netherlands	Ziggo Dome	Personal health issues	
1 September 2023	Nanterre (Note: Labelled as Paris in promotional material.)	France	Paris La Défense Arena	Personal health issues	
2 September 2023	Nanterre	France	Paris La Défense Arena	Personal health issues	
5 September 2023	Nanterre	France	Paris La Défense Arena	Personal health issues	
6 September 2023	Nanterre	France	Paris La Défense Arena	Personal health issues	
9 September 2023	Nanterre	France	Paris La Défense Arena	Personal health issues	
10 September 2023	Nanterre	France	Paris La Défense Arena	Personal health issues	
17 September 2023	Antwerp	Belgium	Sportpaleis	Personal health issues	
18 September 2023	Antwerp	Belgium	Sportpaleis	Personal health issues	
20 September 2023	Antwerp	Belgium	Sportpaleis	Personal health issues	
23 September 2023	Copenhagen	Denmark	Royal Arena	Personal health issues	
24 September 2023	Copenhagen	Denmark	Royal Arena	Personal health issues	
27 September 2023	Bærum (Note: Labelled as Oslo in promotional material.)	Norway	Telenor Arena	Personal health issues	
28 September 2023	Bærum	Norway	Telenor Arena	Personal health issues	
30 September 2023	Solna (Note: Labelled as Stockholm in promotional material.)	Sweden	Friends Arena	Personal health issues	
3 October 2023	Helsinki	Finland	Helsinki Halli	Personal health issues	
4 October 2023	Helsinki	Finland	Helsinki Halli	Personal health issues	
6 March 2024	Prague	Czech Republic	O_{2} Arena	Personal health issues	
8 March 2024	Łódź	Poland	Atlas Arena	Personal health issues	
10 March 2024	Kraków	Poland	Tauron Arena Kraków	Personal health issues	
13 March 2024	Zürich	Switzerland	Hallenstadion	Personal health issues	
14 March 2024	Zürich	Switzerland	Hallenstadion	Personal health issues	
16 March 2024	Zagreb	Croatia	Arena Zagreb	Personal health issues	
19 March 2024	Cologne	Germany	Lanxess Arena	Personal health issues	
21 March 2024	Berlin	Germany	Mercedes-Benz Arena (Note: The Berlin concert was originally set to take place at Waldbühne.)	Personal health issues	
23 March 2024	Munich	Germany	Olympiahalle	Personal health issues	
26 March 2024	Budapest	Hungary	Laszlo Papp Budapest Sports Arena	Personal health issues	
28 March 2024	Vienna	Austria	Wiener Stadthalle	Personal health issues	
31 March 2024	Hamburg	Germany	Barclays Arena	Personal health issues	
2 April 2024	Mannheim	Germany	SAP Arena	Personal health issues	
5 April 2024	Dublin	Ireland	3Arena	Personal health issues	
6 April 2024	Dublin	Ireland	3Arena	Personal health issues	
9 April 2024	Manchester	England	AO Arena	Personal health issues	
10 April 2024	Manchester	England	AO Arena	Personal health issues	
13 April 2024	Glasgow	Scotland	OVO Hydro	Personal health issues	
14 April 2024	Glasgow	Scotland	OVO Hydro	Personal health issues	
17 April 2024	Birmingham	England	Utilita Arena Birmingham	Personal health issues	
18 April 2024	Birmingham	England	Utilita Arena Birmingham	Personal health issues	
21 April 2024	London	England	The O_{2} Arena	Personal health issues	
22 April 2024	London	England	The O_{2} Arena	Personal health issues	

== See also ==
- List of highest-grossing concert tours by women
