= Courage (Celine Dion song) =

Single by Celine Dion

from the album Courage
- Released: 18 September 2019
- Studio: Maison de Musique (Santa Monica); At the Palms (Las Vegas); Air (London); MixStar (Virginia Beach)
- Genre: Pop
- Length: 4:14
- Label: Columbia
- Songwriters: Stephan Moccio; Erik Alcock; Liz Rodrigues
- Producer: Stephan Moccio

Celine Dion singles chronology
"Lying Down" (2019)	"Courage" (2019)	"Set My Heart on Fire" (2024)

Music video
- "Courage" on YouTube

"Courage" is a song by Canadian singer Celine Dion from her twelfth English-language studio album, Courage (2019). It was written by Stephan Moccio, Erik Alcock and Liz Rodrigues, and produced by Moccio. Released as a digital download on 18 September 2019, "Courage" coincided with the start of Dion's Courage World Tour, where she performed the song. It entered the sales charts in Canada and France and received positive reviews from music critics. The black-and-white music video premiered on 13 November 2019, and the song was sent to radio in Quebec in March 2020.

== Background and release ==
"Courage" was written by Stephan Moccio, Erik Alcock and Liz Rodrigues. It was produced by Moccio, who previously co-wrote Dion's 2002 single "A New Day Has Come". "Courage" is a piano ballad about coping with the loss of a loved one. Together with "Imperfections" and "Lying Down", the song was released as a digital download on 18 September 2019, the day Dion started her Courage World Tour to promote Courage.

== Critical reception ==
The song received positive reviews from music critics. A Bit of Pop Music wrote that "Courage" deals with very personal subject matter and described it as a piano- and strings-based power ballad about the loss of someone close. With the death of her husband René Angélil in 2016, the outlet noted that "Courage" is likely meaningful to Dion, who delivers it with emotive vocals and considerable intensity. Mike Wass of Idolator called the track a simple piano ballad that allows Dion to deliver strong vocals while reflecting on life experiences, describing it as raw and very emotional.

== Commercial performance ==
After its release as a digital download on 18 September 2019, "Courage" entered several sales charts, reaching number two in Quebec and number 20 in Canada. In March 2021, it was sent to contemporary hit radio in Quebec, where it peaked at number three.

== Music video ==
The audio for "Courage" was uploaded to YouTube on 18 September 2019. The music video, directed by Se Oh and filmed entirely in black and white, premiered on 13 November 2019. Kai Krause served as cinematographer, and Marco Venditto worked as lighting director. The video was produced by Mad Ruk Entertainment and Telescope Films.

== Credits and personnel ==
- Celine Dion – lead vocals
- Stephan Moccio – producer, composer, lyricist, piano, keyboards, background vocal
- Erik Alcock – composer, lyricist
- Liz Rodrigues – composer, lyricist
- TommyD – string session co-producer
- Jay Paul Bicknell – background vocal, engineer
- Kylen Deporter – background vocal, engineer
- Wired Strings – strings
- Rosie Danvers – string arranger
- Nick Taylor – engineer
- François Lalonde – recording engineer
- Serban Ghenea – mixing engineer
- John Hanes – assistant engineer
- Rob Katz – assistant engineer
- Vlado Meller – mastering engineer
- John McL. Doelp – executive producer

== Charts ==
Chart performance
Chart (2019–2020)	Peak position
Canada Digital Song Sales (Billboard)	20
France Sales (SNEP)	46
Quebec Digital Song Sales (ADISQ)	2
Quebec Radio Songs (ADISQ)	3

== Release history ==
Release history
Region	Date	Format	Label	Ref.
Various	18 September 2019	Digital download; streaming	Columbia	
Quebec	3 March 2020	Contemporary hit radio	Columbia	
