= Imperfections (song) =

Single by Celine Dion

from the album Courage
- Released: 18 September 2019
- Studio: At the Palms (Las Vegas); Big Tree (Los Angeles); MixStar (Virginia Beach)
- Genre: Pop; dance
- Length: 3:59
- Label: Columbia
- Songwriters: Ari Leff; Michael Pollack; Nicholas Perloff-Giles; Dallas Koehlke
- Producer: DallasK

Celine Dion singles chronology
"Ashes" (2018)	"Imperfections" (2019)	"Lying Down" (2019)

Music video
- "Imperfections" on YouTube

"Imperfections" is a song by Canadian singer Celine Dion from her twelfth English‑language studio album, Courage (2019). It was written by Lauv, Michael Pollack, Nicholas Perloff‑Giles and DallasK, and produced by DallasK. Released as a digital download on 18 September 2019, the song was accompanied by a music video that premiered on 26 September 2019 and was sent to adult contemporary radio in the United States on 30 September 2019. "Imperfections" topped both the sales and radio charts in Quebec, received positive reviews from music critics, and was performed by Dion during her Courage World Tour.

== Background and release ==
"Imperfections" was written by American singer‑songwriter Lauv, American DJ‑producer DallasK, Michael Pollack and Nicholas Perloff‑Giles, and produced by DallasK. Alongside "Lying Down" and "Courage", it was released as a digital download on 18 September 2019, the day Dion began her Courage World Tour to promote Courage. "Imperfections" is a mid‑tempo dance track built around an electronic beat and centered on themes of self‑criticism. It impacted adult contemporary radio in the United States on 30 September 2019. On 7 December 2019, the song was added to the B‑list on the BBC Radio 2 airplay playlist in the United Kingdom. A stripped‑down version of "Imperfections" was released on Spotify on 26 February 2020, along with Dion's cover of "Wicked Game" with Chris Isaak.

== Critical reception ==
"Imperfections" received positive reviews from music critics. A Bit of Pop Music described it as a strong pop track with contemporary radio production, noting that it sounds both current and characteristic of Dion. The outlet described the lyrics and vocals as simple but effective. Mike Wass of Idolator called "Imperfections" Dion's most contemporary‑sounding song in years, highlighting its memorable chorus about self‑reflection: "I've got my own imperfections, I got my own set of scars to hide".

== Commercial performance ==
In Quebec, "Imperfections" topped the radio chart for 15 weeks and the sales chart for five weeks. In Canada, it reached number five on the Adult Contemporary chart, number 40 on the Hot Adult Contemporary chart, and number 69 on the Canadian Hot 100. In the United States, it peaked at number 11 on the Adult Contemporary chart and number 23 on Pop Digital Song Sales. Internationally, it reached number 17 in Belgium's Wallonia, number 32 in Croatia, number 43 on the sales chart in France, and number 97 in Scotland.

== Music video ==
The music video for "Imperfections" was directed by Gabriel Coutu‑Dumont and produced by Sailor Productions/Silent Partners Studio. Shot entirely in black and white, it features Dion in a series of gowns and high‑fashion ensembles. The video premiered on 26 September 2019. Emily Zemler of Rolling Stone described it as evocative, contrasting its glamorous, behind‑the‑scenes aesthetic with the song's focus on self‑criticism, noting the line "I got my own imperfections". The video ends with Dion appearing without makeup, underscoring the song's message: "I got my own imperfections/I got my own set of scars to hide/I got my own imperfections/I can't hold your heart when I'm fixing mine".

Nicholas Hautman of Us Weekly called the video stunning, praising Dion's appearance in outfits ranging from a puffy black dress to a strapless white gown. He noted that as the song progresses, Dion returns to her dressing room and removes her makeup, revealing her natural look. Rebecca Alter of Vulture.com described the video as "perfect", writing that Dion sings about her flaws while dressed in couture and praising the dramatic styling, including billowing sleeves, bold patterns and a wide‑brimmed hat. Alter highlighted a sequence of Dion running toward the camera in black and white, comparing it to early cinema, and concluded that "we know she's perfect".

== Formats and track listing ==
- Spotify streaming single
1. "Imperfections" (recorded at Electric Lady Studios, NYC) – 2:55
2. "Wicked Game" (recorded at Electric Lady Studios, NYC; featuring Chris Isaak) – 4:51

== Credits and personnel ==
- Celine Dion – lead vocals
- Ari Leff – composer, lyricist, associated performer
- Dallas Koehlke – composer, lyricist, producer, associated performer, background vocal, recording engineer
- Michael Pollack – composer, lyricist, associated performer, background vocal
- Nicholas Perloff-Giles – composer, lyricist
- Alyssa Lourdiz Cantu – background vocal
- François Lalonde – recording engineer
- Serban Ghenea – mixing engineer
- Vlado Meller – mastering engineer
- John McL. Doelp – executive producer

== Charts ==
=== Weekly charts ===
Weekly chart performance
Chart (2019–2020)	Peak position
Belgium (Ultratip Bubbling Under Flanders)	9
Belgium (Ultratop 50 Wallonia)	17
Canada Hot 100 (Billboard)	69
Canada AC (Billboard)	5
Canada Hot AC (Billboard)	40
Croatia (HRT)	32
France Sales (SNEP)	43
Quebec Digital Song Sales (ADISQ)	1
Quebec Radio Songs (ADISQ)	1
Scotland Singles (Official Charts)	97
US Adult Contemporary (Billboard)	11
US Pop Digital Song Sales (Billboard)	23

=== Year-end charts ===
Year-end chart performance
Chart (2020)	Position
US Adult Contemporary (Billboard)	26

== Certifications ==
Certifications
Region	Certification	Certified units/sales
Canada (Music Canada)	Gold	40,000^{‡}
^{‡} Sales+streaming figures based on certification alone.

== Release history ==
Release history
Region	Date	Format	Version	Label	Ref.
Various	18 September 2019	Digital download; streaming	Original	Columbia	
United States	30 September 2019	Adult contemporary radio	Original	Columbia	
Italy	4 October 2019	Contemporary hit radio	Original	Columbia	
United Kingdom	7 December 2019	Adult contemporary radio	Original	Columbia	
Various	26 February 2020	Streaming	Spotify single	Columbia	
