= Lying Down =

Single by Celine Dion

from the album Courage
- Released: 18 September 2019
- Studio: At the Palms (Las Vegas); Metropolis (London); Power Sound (Amsterdam); Wisseloord (Hilversum); Tribe (Naples)
- Genre: Pop; electro
- Length: 3:58
- Label: Columbia
- Songwriters: David Guetta; Giorgio Tuinfort; Sia Furler
- Producers: Guetta; Tuinfort

Celine Dion singles chronology
"Imperfections" (2019)	"Lying Down" (2019)	"Courage" (2019)

Audio
- "Lying Down" on YouTube

"Lying Down" is a song by Canadian singer Celine Dion from her twelfth English‑language studio album, Courage (2019). It was written by David Guetta, Giorgio Tuinfort and Sia, and produced by Guetta and Tuinfort. Released as a digital download on 18 September 2019, the song coincided with the launch of Dion's Courage World Tour, where she performed it during the first fifteen dates before replacing it with "Imperfections". "Lying Down" entered several charts and received positive reviews from music critics. On 19 October 2019, it was sent to radio in the United Kingdom.

== Background and release ==
"Lying Down" was written by Australian singer‑songwriter Sia, French DJ‑producer David Guetta and Surinamese‑Dutch musician Giorgio Tuinfort, and produced by Guetta and Tuinfort. Together with "Imperfections" and "Courage", it was released as a digital download on 18 September 2019, the day Dion began her Courage World Tour to promote Courage. "Lying Down" is a string‑laden electro ballad that encourages a renewed outlook after a toxic relationship. Sia had previously co‑written Dion's 2013 single "Loved Me Back to Life". On 19 October 2019, "Lying Down" was added to the A‑list on the BBC Radio 2 airplay playlist in the United Kingdom and became record of the week.

== Critical reception ==
The song received positive reviews from music critics. A Bit of Pop Music described "Lying Down" as a modern pop ballad in which Sia's writing style complements Dion's vocals and gives the track a contemporary sound. The outlet called it a "powerful tune" with a "bombastic" build‑up and "larger than life" vocals. Mike Wass of Idolator described "Lying Down" as a soaring electro‑ballad about letting go of the emotional weight of a toxic relationship. He characterized the production as "icy", suggesting that Dion was prepared to explore new sonic territory on Courage.

== Commercial performance ==
After being released as a digital download on 18 September 2019, "Lying Down" entered several sales charts, reaching number three in Quebec, number 32 in Canada, number 41 in France, number 59 in Scotland, and number 74 in the United Kingdom. It also peaked at number 16 on the Finnish Airplay chart and number 18 on the Japanese Hot Overseas chart.

== Music video ==
The audio for "Lying Down" was uploaded to YouTube on 18 September 2019. In an interview aired on Entertainment Tonight Canada in September 2019, Dion revealed that she was on the set of the music video for "Lying Down". However, the video was not released. In April 2026, previously unreleased "Lying Down" video captures from director of photography and photographer John Londono's website surfaced online.

== Credits and personnel ==
- Celine Dion – lead vocals
- David Guetta – composer, lyricist, producer, programmer
- Sia Furler – composer, lyricist, background vocal
- Giorgio Tuinfort – composer, lyricist, producer, programmer, piano
- Pierre-Luc Rioux – guitar
- Ton Dijkman – drums
- Marcel Schimscheimer – bass
- Franck Van der Heijden – orchestrator
- François Lalonde – recording engineer
- Paul Norris – recording engineer
- Paul Power – recording engineer
- Rob Katz – assistant engineer
- Wessel Oltheten – assistant engineer
- Xavier Stephenson – assistant engineer
- Ronald Prent – mixing engineer
- Tibor Laho – mixing engineer

== Charts ==
Chart performance
Chart (2019)	Peak position
Canada Digital Song Sales (Billboard)	32
Finland Airplay (Radiosoittolista)	16
France Digital Sales (SNEP)	41
Japan Hot Overseas (Billboard Japan)	18
Quebec Digital Song Sales (ADISQ)	3
Scotland Singles (Official Charts)	59
UK Singles Downloads (Official Charts)	74

== Release history ==
Release history
Region	Date	Format	Label	Ref.
Various	18 September 2019	Digital download; streaming	Columbia	
United Kingdom	19 October 2019	Adult contemporary radio	Columbia	
