= Flying on My Own =

Promotional single by Celine Dion

from the album Courage
- Released: 9 June 2019
- Studio: At the Palms (Las Vegas); Penthouse (Lidingö); Infrec (Copenhagen)
- Genre: EDM; dance-pop
- Length: 3:32
- Label: Columbia
- Songwriters: Jörgen Elofsson; Liz Rodrigues; Anton "Hybrid" Mårtensson
- Producers: Jörgen Elofsson; Hybrid; Ugly Babies

Lyric video
- "Flying on My Own" on YouTube

"Flying on My Own" is a song by Canadian singer Celine Dion, recorded for her twelfth English-language studio album, Courage (2019). The track is an EDM and dance-pop composition that incorporates elements of pop, adult contemporary, and electronic music. It was written by Jörgen Elofsson, Liz Rodrigues, and Anton "Hybrid" Mårtensson, with production by Elofsson, Hybrid, and Ugly Babies. A live version, captured during Dion's Las Vegas residency Celine, was issued digitally on 9 June 2019, one day after the residency concluded. The studio recording followed on 28 June 2019 as a promotional single from Courage, released by Columbia Records. "Flying on My Own" received positive critical notices and topped the chart in Quebec, reached the top ten on digital rankings in Canada and France, and peaked at number seven on the US Dance Club Songs chart.

== Background and release ==
On 19 December 2017, Dion shared a photo from the Studio at the Palms in Las Vegas with Swedish songwriter and producer Jörgen Elofsson, writing that they were "making beautiful music". Elofsson, who has written for artists including Kelly Clarkson, Britney Spears, and Westlife, later collaborated with Dion on "Flying on My Own". She premiered the song on 7 June 2019 during her residency show, Celine. Before performing it, she told the audience she was "very nervous".

"Flying on My Own" was written by Elofsson, Rodrigues, and Mårtensson, and produced by Elofsson, Hybrid, and Ugly Babies. A video of the live debut was uploaded to Dion's YouTube channel on 8 June 2019. The performance coincided with the final weekend of her residency at Caesars Palace.

The live version was released digitally on 9 June 2019. The studio version and a Dave Audé remix followed on 28 June 2019, and the track was later included on Courage. Columbia Records described the release as a gift to fans rather than an official single. The song was made available on major streaming platforms. Dion performed it at BST Hyde Park on 5 July 2019. On 12 August 2019, DJ Riddler premiered his official remix.

== Critical reception ==
"Flying on My Own" received positive reviews. Mike Wass of Idolator described it as a soaring dance-pop anthem and a campy, upbeat track. Hilary Hughes of Billboard called it Dion's own Sin City nightclub anthem. CBC Music praised the song's energy, noting that Dion "soars" as she embraces the "winds of change".

== Commercial performance ==
"Flying on My Own" reached number one in Quebec, number nine on the Canadian digital sales chart, number seven on the US Dance Club Songs chart, and number 23 on US Pop Digital Song Sales. It also peaked at number eight on the French digital sales chart, number 90 in Scotland, and number 99 on the UK Singles Downloads Chart.

== Music video ==
The debut live performance, filmed on 7 June 2019 in Las Vegas, was uploaded to Dion's YouTube channel the following day. A lyric video was released on 28 June 2019, accompanied by the audio for the Dave Audé remix.

== Formats and track listing ==
- Digital single
1. "Flying on My Own" – 3:32
2. "Flying on My Own" (Dave Audé remix) – 4:06
- Digital single
1. "Flying on My Own" (live from Las Vegas) – 3:58

== Remixes ==
1. "Flying on My Own" (Dave Audé club remix) – 6:29
2. "Flying on My Own" (Dave Audé mixshow) – 4:51
3. "Flying on My Own" (Dave Audé remix) – 4:06
4. "Flying on My Own" (Riddler club remix) – 5:04
5. "Flying on My Own" (Riddler radio mix) – 3:22
6. "Flying on My Own" (Riddler dub remix) – 3:39
7. "Flying on My Own" (Riddler instrumental club remix) – 5:02
8. "Flying on My Own" (Riddler instrumental radio mix) – 3:21

== Credits and personnel ==
- Celine Dion – lead vocals
- Jörgen Elofsson – composer, lyricist, producer, keyboards
- Liz Rodrigues – composer, lyricist, background vocal
- Anton "Hybrid" Mårtensson – composer, producer, keyboards
- Ugly Babies – producer
- Paw Lagermann – keyboards, mixing engineer
- Lina Rafn – keyboards
- Vlado Meller – mastering engineer
- François Lalonde – recording engineer
- Rob Katz – assistant engineer
- John McL. Doelp – executive producer

== Charts ==
Chart performance
Chart (2019)	Peak position
Belgium (Ultratip Bubbling Under Flanders)	28
Canada Digital Song Sales (Billboard)	9
France Digital Sales (SNEP)	8
Scotland Singles (OCC)	90
Quebec Digital Song Sales (ADISQ)	1
UK Singles Downloads (OCC)	99
US Dance Club Songs (Billboard)	7
US Pop Digital Song Sales (Billboard)	23

== Release history ==
Release history
Region	Date	Format	Version	Label	Ref.
Various	9 June 2019	Digital download; streaming	Live from Las Vegas	Columbia	
Various	28 June 2019	Digital download; streaming	Studio version	Columbia	
Various	28 June 2019	Digital download; streaming	Dave Audé remix	Columbia	
