= Celine (residency) =

Las Vegas concert residency by Céline Dion

- Residency by Celine Dion
- Promotional poster for the residency
- Location: Paradise, Nevada
- Venue: The Colosseum at Caesars Palace
- Start date: 15 March 2011
- End date: 8 June 2019
- No. of shows: 427
- Attendance: 1.74 million
- Box office: $296.2 million

Celine Dion concert chronology
- Taking Chances World Tour (2008–2009); Celine (2011–2019); European Tour 2013 (2013)

Celine was the second concert residency by Canadian singer Celine Dion. It was staged at The Colosseum at Caesars Palace on the Las Vegas Strip in Paradise, Nevada, beginning 15 March 2011, with an estimated seventy performances per year. The residency ranked 26th in Pollstar's "Top 50 Worldwide Tour (Mid-Year)", earning over $20 million. Seen by more than 200,000 people, it became the number one show in 2011 for North America. It made Dion the top earner in Las Vegas, with $500,000 per show, and led to her being described as the "most profitable music act in Las Vegas" since Elvis Presley.

According to Pollstar end of year data (2011–13), the residency grossed $116.5 million from 726,346 tickets sold. In March 2013, Dion's manager and husband, René Angélil, announced that the residency contract had been extended to 2019. On 13 August 2014, Dion and Caesars announced that all planned shows through 22 March 2015 had been cancelled due to Angélil's battle with throat cancer.

On 24 March 2015, it was announced that Dion would resume the residency on 27 August 2015 with new theatrical and musical elements, along with a new visual presentation. Around the same time, Dion's management released a statement confirming the departure of the singer's longtime touring band members: musical director Claude "Mego" Lemay, guitarist André Coutu, keyboardist Yves Frulla, bassist Marc Langis, and violinist Jean-Seb Carré. The new band included musical director Scott Price, guitarist Kaven Girouard, bassist Yves Labonte, and violinist Phillippe Dunnigan, who took on the main violin solos. On 14 January 2016, Dion cancelled the remaining January performances following her husband's death from cancer. She resumed the residency on 23 February to a sold-out audience and positive critical response. Dion marked her 1000th Las Vegas show on 8 October 2016. The residency was seen by more than two million spectators. The show concluded on 8 June 2019, as announced on 24 September 2018.

Celine became the second biggest concert residency of all time, after A New Day..., with a gross approaching $300 million.

== Background ==
"I'm coming back home to the Colosseum at Caesars Palace and I'm very excited about it. With the orchestra and the band we're going to be able to perform our songs like never before. The repertoire is going to be extraordinary...a mix of timeless Hollywood classics, along with all the favorites that my fans like to hear me sing. It's going to be a very beautiful show, and I think we'll be raising the bar higher than we've ever done before. There'll be some truly wonderful moments......I can't wait!"

On 15 March 2011, Dion began a three-year residency at the Colosseum at Caesars Palace. The new show included 31 musicians, consisting of a full orchestra and band. The residency was directed and produced by Ken Ehrlich, with creative input from Dion's long-time lighting designer Yves Aucoin and sound mixer/designer Denis Savage. Moment Factory was responsible for the visual elements of the production; the company had previously worked with Nine Inch Nails and DJ Tiesto. The residency did not include dancers or the Cirque du Soleil-style choreography used in Dion's earlier Colosseum show, A New Day.

Dion announced her return to Las Vegas during an appearance on The Oprah Winfrey Show. Tickets went on sale that same week and demand was exceptionally strong. The opening night performance on 15 March sold out within minutes. Rehearsals began on 17 January 2011 in Florida, and continued at the Colosseum starting on 17 February 2011 when Dion returned to Las Vegas to prepare for the new production.

In January 2011, it was reported that ticket sales for the residency had already surpassed the $10 million mark, making it the fastest-selling engagement in the venue's history. Caesars Palace President Gary Selesner stated that the initial run of shows through 17 April would be completely sold out.

== Critical reception ==
The residency received widespread praise from music critics. USA Today wrote, "Dion isn't here to perform. She's here to kill it. Again... she isn't aiming for applause. She's looking for rapture." The Las Vegas Sun stated, "A magnificent masterpiece! Celine has single-handedly redefined class and elegance in onstage performances. Her voice is sent from the angels." The Montreal Gazette wrote, "Dion magnificent in new Las Vegas show. One hell of a show!...Jaw-dropping... Grandiose, yet intimate...Pure entertainment of the highest order. Worth every penny!" Richard Ouzounian of the Toronto Star headlined his review, "Celine Dion's Vegas show more spectacular than ever," adding, "If her last show sold out for five years, this one should make it for ten."

== Commercial performance ==
At the end of 2011, Pollstar reported that Dion ranked number 10 on its Top 25 North American Tours list, with a gross of $41.2 million. At the end of 2012, she placed number 29 on the Top 50 Worldwide Tours list, earning $36.5 million. In 2013, Pollstar listed her at number 23 on the Top 25 North American Tours with a gross of $38.8 million, and number 25 on the Worldwide Tours list, which included earnings from the European Tour 2013.

In its 2014 Mid Year Tour Gross report, Pollstar placed Dion at number 7 on the Top 100 North American Tours list and number 28 on the Top 100 Worldwide Tours list, with a gross of $21.1 million. In 2015, she ranked number 47 on the Top 100 American Tours list and number 77 on the Worldwide Grosses list, with a total gross of $22.6 million, reflecting her year-long break to care for her husband.

Dion ranked number 10 on the 2016 Year End Top 100 Worldwide Tours with a gross of $85.5 million, and number 14 on the 2016 Year End Top 200 North American Tours with $61.1 million. She then placed number 11 on the 2017 Year End Top 20 Worldwide Tours with a gross of $101.2 million, making her the highest-grossing female artist of that year. Dion also ranked number 15 on Billboard's 2018 year-end boxscore chart with a total gross of $76.5 million.

== Broadcasts and recordings ==
Dion performing "My Heart Will Go On" on opening night (15 March 2011).

Several concerts were professionally filmed for television and promotional use. The premiere concert on 15 March 2011 was recorded in full, with excerpts later included in the documentary "Celine: 3 Boys and a New Show", broadcast in early October 2011 on the Oprah Winfrey Network and used in advertisements for the residency. The documentary featured rehearsal footage of numerous songs, as well as excerpts from the premiere, including "Open Arms", "Goldfinger", "(If You Can't Sing It) You'll Have to Swing It (Mr. Paganini)", "River Deep, Mountain High", "My Heart Will Go On", "Ne me quitte pas", The Power of Love, "At Seventeen", and "Ben/Man in the Mirror". Additional broadcasts followed: "Open Arms" from the 26 March concert aired during the 2011 MDA Show of Strength telethon, and "Because You Loved Me", filmed on 15 June, was shown during the 63rd Primetime Emmy Awards on 19 June 2011.

On 15 January 2012, Dion performed a special concert supporting "Play without Pain: Children's Sickle Cell Benefit". The entire event was filmed, with excerpts of "Open Arms" and "Lullabye (Goodnight, My Angel)" appearing in a behind-the-scenes video, and a 47‑second clip of "My Heart Will Go On" later sold to news outlets after the cancellation of future concerts in August 2014. A live video of "My Heart Will Go On", filmed on 1, 2, and 3 July 2011 and showing Dion performing inside a circular water curtain created by Aquatique Show, leaked on YouTube on 12 July 2012 before its official release on 31 July. Her performance of "Loved Me Back to Life" on 30 December 2013 was filmed and broadcast the next day on Entertainment Tonight Canada.

After her husband's death on 14 January 2016, Dion resumed her residency on 23 February 2016. A video tribute, along with "With One More Look at You/Watch Closely Now" and "Where Does My Heart Beat Now", was streamed live on Facebook, and an excerpt of "All by Myself" from that night was later shown on television as she struggled to finish the song. In 2017, several moments were streamed or uploaded to Facebook, including her tribute to the victims of the Manchester attack on 23 May, the first live performance of "How Does a Moment Last Forever" on 24 May, and a message with an excerpt of "Recovering" on 20 September after a destructive hurricane season. Following the Las Vegas mass shooting, Dion returned to the stage two days later, opening the show with a streamed speech and donating all proceeds from that performance to the victims' families.

On 31 December 2017, CNN aired a short satellite interview and an excerpt of "Because You Loved Me" during its New Year's Eve Live with Anderson Cooper and Andy Cohen, while Fox's New Year's Eve with Steve Harvey broadcast "River Deep, Mountain High", prerecorded on 25 November 2017. Dion did not change costumes during that show due to wearing a corset after cancelling the previous performance because of lower back spasms. Later recordings shared online included the first live performance of "Ashes" on 22 May 2018, with another excerpt posted on 10 February 2019 to mark the Grammy nomination for the Deadpool 2 soundtrack, and the first live performance of "Flying on My Own" on 7 June 2019, released the following day.

== Set list ==
The following set list was performed during the shows between 15 March 2011 and 22 January 2012.

"I Drove All Night" video introduction

1. "Open Arms"
2. "Where Does My Heart Beat Now"
3. "Because You Loved Me"
4. "It's All Coming Back to Me Now" / "The Power of Love" (medley)

Violin solo interlude

5. "(If You Can't Sing It) You'll Have to Swing It (Mr. Paganini)"
6. "Lullabye (Goodnight, My Angel)"
7. "The Reason"

James Bond Theme instrumental interlude

8. "Goldfinger" / "Nobody Does It Better" / "Live and Let Die" (medley)

"Spinning Wheel" background singers intermission

9. "How Do You Keep the Music Playing?"
10. "Overjoyed" (virtual duet with Stevie Wonder)

Video interlude

11. "At Seventeen"
12. "Beauty and the Beast"
13. "Ne me quitte pas"
14. "All by Myself"

"Smooth Criminal" / "Beat It" instrumental interlude

15. "Ben" / "Man in the Mirror" (medley)

"Declaration of Love" instrumental interlude

16. "Love Can Move Mountains" / "River Deep, Mountain High" (medley)

Titanic instrumental interlude

17. "My Heart Will Go On"

== Shows ==
=== Legs 1–10 ===
Date	City	Country	Venue	Attendance	Revenue
Leg 1
15 March 2011	Las Vegas	United States	The Colosseum at Caesars Palace	84,209 / 84,209	$14,083,340
16 March 2011	Las Vegas	United States	The Colosseum at Caesars Palace	84,209 / 84,209	$14,083,340
19 March 2011	Las Vegas	United States	The Colosseum at Caesars Palace	84,209 / 84,209	$14,083,340
20 March 2011	Las Vegas	United States	The Colosseum at Caesars Palace	84,209 / 84,209	$14,083,340
22 March 2011	Las Vegas	United States	The Colosseum at Caesars Palace	84,209 / 84,209	$14,083,340
23 March 2011	Las Vegas	United States	The Colosseum at Caesars Palace	84,209 / 84,209	$14,083,340
25 March 2011	Las Vegas	United States	The Colosseum at Caesars Palace	84,209 / 84,209	$14,083,340
26 March 2011	Las Vegas	United States	The Colosseum at Caesars Palace	84,209 / 84,209	$14,083,340
1 April 2011	Las Vegas	United States	The Colosseum at Caesars Palace	84,209 / 84,209	$14,083,340
2 April 2011	Las Vegas	United States	The Colosseum at Caesars Palace	84,209 / 84,209	$14,083,340
3 April 2011	Las Vegas	United States	The Colosseum at Caesars Palace	84,209 / 84,209	$14,083,340
6 April 2011	Las Vegas	United States	The Colosseum at Caesars Palace	84,209 / 84,209	$14,083,340
7 April 2011	Las Vegas	United States	The Colosseum at Caesars Palace	84,209 / 84,209	$14,083,340
9 April 2011	Las Vegas	United States	The Colosseum at Caesars Palace	84,209 / 84,209	$14,083,340
10 April 2011	Las Vegas	United States	The Colosseum at Caesars Palace	84,209 / 84,209	$14,083,340
12 April 2011	Las Vegas	United States	The Colosseum at Caesars Palace	84,209 / 84,209	$14,083,340
13 April 2011	Las Vegas	United States	The Colosseum at Caesars Palace	84,209 / 84,209	$14,083,340
15 April 2011	Las Vegas	United States	The Colosseum at Caesars Palace	84,209 / 84,209	$14,083,340
16 April 2011	Las Vegas	United States	The Colosseum at Caesars Palace	84,209 / 84,209	$14,083,340
17 April 2011	Las Vegas	United States	The Colosseum at Caesars Palace	84,209 / 84,209	$14,083,340
Leg 2
7 June 2011	Las Vegas	United States	The Colosseum at Caesars Palace	72,055 / 72,055	$12,019,715
8 June 2011	Las Vegas	United States	The Colosseum at Caesars Palace	72,055 / 72,055	$12,019,715
11 June 2011	Las Vegas	United States	The Colosseum at Caesars Palace	72,055 / 72,055	$12,019,715
12 June 2011	Las Vegas	United States	The Colosseum at Caesars Palace	72,055 / 72,055	$12,019,715
14 June 2011	Las Vegas	United States	The Colosseum at Caesars Palace	72,055 / 72,055	$12,019,715
15 June 2011	Las Vegas	United States	The Colosseum at Caesars Palace	72,055 / 72,055	$12,019,715
18 June 2011	Las Vegas	United States	The Colosseum at Caesars Palace	72,055 / 72,055	$12,019,715
19 June 2011	Las Vegas	United States	The Colosseum at Caesars Palace	72,055 / 72,055	$12,019,715
21 June 2011	Las Vegas	United States	The Colosseum at Caesars Palace	72,055 / 72,055	$12,019,715
22 June 2011	Las Vegas	United States	The Colosseum at Caesars Palace	72,055 / 72,055	$12,019,715
25 June 2011	Las Vegas	United States	The Colosseum at Caesars Palace	72,055 / 72,055	$12,019,715
26 June 2011	Las Vegas	United States	The Colosseum at Caesars Palace	72,055 / 72,055	$12,019,715
28 June 2011	Las Vegas	United States	The Colosseum at Caesars Palace	72,055 / 72,055	$12,019,715
29 June 2011	Las Vegas	United States	The Colosseum at Caesars Palace	72,055 / 72,055	$12,019,715
1 July 2011	Las Vegas	United States	The Colosseum at Caesars Palace	72,055 / 72,055	$12,019,715
2 July 2011	Las Vegas	United States	The Colosseum at Caesars Palace	72,055 / 72,055	$12,019,715
3 July 2011	Las Vegas	United States	The Colosseum at Caesars Palace	72,055 / 72,055	$12,019,715
Leg 3
19 July 2011	Las Vegas	United States	The Colosseum at Caesars Palace	71,730 / 71,730	$11,905,240
20 July 2011	Las Vegas	United States	The Colosseum at Caesars Palace	71,730 / 71,730	$11,905,240
23 July 2011	Las Vegas	United States	The Colosseum at Caesars Palace	71,730 / 71,730	$11,905,240
24 July 2011	Las Vegas	United States	The Colosseum at Caesars Palace	71,730 / 71,730	$11,905,240
26 July 2011	Las Vegas	United States	The Colosseum at Caesars Palace	71,730 / 71,730	$11,905,240
27 July 2011	Las Vegas	United States	The Colosseum at Caesars Palace	71,730 / 71,730	$11,905,240
30 July 2011	Las Vegas	United States	The Colosseum at Caesars Palace	71,730 / 71,730	$11,905,240
31 July 2011	Las Vegas	United States	The Colosseum at Caesars Palace	71,730 / 71,730	$11,905,240
2 August 2011	Las Vegas	United States	The Colosseum at Caesars Palace	71,730 / 71,730	$11,905,240
3 August 2011	Las Vegas	United States	The Colosseum at Caesars Palace	71,730 / 71,730	$11,905,240
6 August 2011	Las Vegas	United States	The Colosseum at Caesars Palace	71,730 / 71,730	$11,905,240
7 August 2011	Las Vegas	United States	The Colosseum at Caesars Palace	71,730 / 71,730	$11,905,240
9 August 2011	Las Vegas	United States	The Colosseum at Caesars Palace	71,730 / 71,730	$11,905,240
10 August 2011	Las Vegas	United States	The Colosseum at Caesars Palace	71,730 / 71,730	$11,905,240
12 August 2011	Las Vegas	United States	The Colosseum at Caesars Palace	71,730 / 71,730	$11,905,240
13 August 2011	Las Vegas	United States	The Colosseum at Caesars Palace	71,730 / 71,730	$11,905,240
14 August 2011	Las Vegas	United States	The Colosseum at Caesars Palace	71,730 / 71,730	$11,905,240
Leg 4
28 December 2011	Las Vegas	United States	The Colosseum at Caesars Palace	66,490 / 66,490	$10,628,760
30 December 2011	Las Vegas	United States	The Colosseum at Caesars Palace	66,490 / 66,490	$10,628,760
31 December 2011	Las Vegas	United States	The Colosseum at Caesars Palace	66,490 / 66,490	$10,628,760
3 January 2012	Las Vegas	United States	The Colosseum at Caesars Palace	66,490 / 66,490	$10,628,760
4 January 2012	Las Vegas	United States	The Colosseum at Caesars Palace	66,490 / 66,490	$10,628,760
7 January 2012	Las Vegas	United States	The Colosseum at Caesars Palace	66,490 / 66,490	$10,628,760
8 January 2012	Las Vegas	United States	The Colosseum at Caesars Palace	66,490 / 66,490	$10,628,760
10 January 2012	Las Vegas	United States	The Colosseum at Caesars Palace	66,490 / 66,490	$10,628,760
11 January 2012	Las Vegas	United States	The Colosseum at Caesars Palace	66,490 / 66,490	$10,628,760
14 January 2012	Las Vegas	United States	The Colosseum at Caesars Palace	66,490 / 66,490	$10,628,760
15 January 2012	Las Vegas	United States	The Colosseum at Caesars Palace	66,490 / 66,490	$10,628,760
17 January 2012	Las Vegas	United States	The Colosseum at Caesars Palace	66,490 / 66,490	$10,628,760
18 January 2012	Las Vegas	United States	The Colosseum at Caesars Palace	66,490 / 66,490	$10,628,760
20 January 2012	Las Vegas	United States	The Colosseum at Caesars Palace	66,490 / 66,490	$10,628,760
21 January 2012	Las Vegas	United States	The Colosseum at Caesars Palace	66,490 / 66,490	$10,628,760
22 January 2012	Las Vegas	United States	The Colosseum at Caesars Palace	66,490 / 66,490	$10,628,760
Leg 5
9 June 2012	Las Vegas	United States	The Colosseum at Caesars Palace	76,468 / 77,991	$12,569,716
10 June 2012	Las Vegas	United States	The Colosseum at Caesars Palace	76,468 / 77,991	$12,569,716
12 June 2012	Las Vegas	United States	The Colosseum at Caesars Palace	76,468 / 77,991	$12,569,716
13 June 2012	Las Vegas	United States	The Colosseum at Caesars Palace	76,468 / 77,991	$12,569,716
16 June 2012	Las Vegas	United States	The Colosseum at Caesars Palace	76,468 / 77,991	$12,569,716
17 June 2012	Las Vegas	United States	The Colosseum at Caesars Palace	76,468 / 77,991	$12,569,716
19 June 2012	Las Vegas	United States	The Colosseum at Caesars Palace	76,468 / 77,991	$12,569,716
20 June 2012	Las Vegas	United States	The Colosseum at Caesars Palace	76,468 / 77,991	$12,569,716
23 June 2012	Las Vegas	United States	The Colosseum at Caesars Palace	76,468 / 77,991	$12,569,716
24 June 2012	Las Vegas	United States	The Colosseum at Caesars Palace	76,468 / 77,991	$12,569,716
26 June 2012	Las Vegas	United States	The Colosseum at Caesars Palace	76,468 / 77,991	$12,569,716
27 June 2012	Las Vegas	United States	The Colosseum at Caesars Palace	76,468 / 77,991	$12,569,716
30 June 2012	Las Vegas	United States	The Colosseum at Caesars Palace	76,468 / 77,991	$12,569,716
1 July 2012	Las Vegas	United States	The Colosseum at Caesars Palace	76,468 / 77,991	$12,569,716
3 July 2012	Las Vegas	United States	The Colosseum at Caesars Palace	76,468 / 77,991	$12,569,716
4 July 2012	Las Vegas	United States	The Colosseum at Caesars Palace	76,468 / 77,991	$12,569,716
6 July 2012	Las Vegas	United States	The Colosseum at Caesars Palace	76,468 / 77,991	$12,569,716
7 July 2012	Las Vegas	United States	The Colosseum at Caesars Palace	76,468 / 77,991	$12,569,716
8 July 2012	Las Vegas	United States	The Colosseum at Caesars Palace	76,468 / 77,991	$12,569,716
Leg 6
24 July 2012	Las Vegas	United States	The Colosseum at Caesars Palace	68,791 / 71,787	$11,187,968
25 July 2012	Las Vegas	United States	The Colosseum at Caesars Palace	68,791 / 71,787	$11,187,968
28 July 2012	Las Vegas	United States	The Colosseum at Caesars Palace	68,791 / 71,787	$11,187,968
29 July 2012	Las Vegas	United States	The Colosseum at Caesars Palace	68,791 / 71,787	$11,187,968
31 July 2012	Las Vegas	United States	The Colosseum at Caesars Palace	68,791 / 71,787	$11,187,968
1 August 2012	Las Vegas	United States	The Colosseum at Caesars Palace	68,791 / 71,787	$11,187,968
4 August 2012	Las Vegas	United States	The Colosseum at Caesars Palace	68,791 / 71,787	$11,187,968
5 August 2012	Las Vegas	United States	The Colosseum at Caesars Palace	68,791 / 71,787	$11,187,968
7 August 2012	Las Vegas	United States	The Colosseum at Caesars Palace	68,791 / 71,787	$11,187,968
8 August 2012	Las Vegas	United States	The Colosseum at Caesars Palace	68,791 / 71,787	$11,187,968
11 August 2012	Las Vegas	United States	The Colosseum at Caesars Palace	68,791 / 71,787	$11,187,968
12 August 2012	Las Vegas	United States	The Colosseum at Caesars Palace	68,791 / 71,787	$11,187,968
14 August 2012	Las Vegas	United States	The Colosseum at Caesars Palace	68,791 / 71,787	$11,187,968
15 August 2012	Las Vegas	United States	The Colosseum at Caesars Palace	68,791 / 71,787	$11,187,968
17 August 2012	Las Vegas	United States	The Colosseum at Caesars Palace	68,791 / 71,787	$11,187,968
18 August 2012	Las Vegas	United States	The Colosseum at Caesars Palace	68,791 / 71,787	$11,187,968
19 August 2012	Las Vegas	United States	The Colosseum at Caesars Palace	68,791 / 71,787	$11,187,968
Leg 7
28 December 2012	Las Vegas	United States	The Colosseum at Caesars Palace	102,574 / 106,902 (Note: Attendance and revenue for legs 7 and 8 are combined.)	$16,999,615
30 December 2012	Las Vegas	United States	The Colosseum at Caesars Palace	102,574 / 106,902	$16,999,615
31 December 2012	Las Vegas	United States	The Colosseum at Caesars Palace	102,574 / 106,902	$16,999,615
3 January 2013	Las Vegas	United States	The Colosseum at Caesars Palace	102,574 / 106,902	$16,999,615
5 January 2013	Las Vegas	United States	The Colosseum at Caesars Palace	102,574 / 106,902	$16,999,615
6 January 2013	Las Vegas	United States	The Colosseum at Caesars Palace	102,574 / 106,902	$16,999,615
9 January 2013	Las Vegas	United States	The Colosseum at Caesars Palace	102,574 / 106,902	$16,999,615
12 January 2013	Las Vegas	United States	The Colosseum at Caesars Palace	102,574 / 106,902	$16,999,615
13 January 2013	Las Vegas	United States	The Colosseum at Caesars Palace	102,574 / 106,902	$16,999,615
15 January 2013	Las Vegas	United States	The Colosseum at Caesars Palace	102,574 / 106,902	$16,999,615
16 January 2013	Las Vegas	United States	The Colosseum at Caesars Palace	102,574 / 106,902	$16,999,615
18 January 2013	Las Vegas	United States	The Colosseum at Caesars Palace	102,574 / 106,902	$16,999,615
19 January 2013	Las Vegas	United States	The Colosseum at Caesars Palace	102,574 / 106,902	$16,999,615
20 January 2013	Las Vegas	United States	The Colosseum at Caesars Palace	102,574 / 106,902	$16,999,615
Leg 8
26 February 2013	Las Vegas	United States	The Colosseum at Caesars Palace	—	—
27 February 2013	Las Vegas	United States	The Colosseum at Caesars Palace	—	—
2 March 2013	Las Vegas	United States	The Colosseum at Caesars Palace	—	—
3 March 2013	Las Vegas	United States	The Colosseum at Caesars Palace	—	—
5 March 2013	Las Vegas	United States	The Colosseum at Caesars Palace	—	—
6 March 2013	Las Vegas	United States	The Colosseum at Caesars Palace	—	—
9 March 2013	Las Vegas	United States	The Colosseum at Caesars Palace	—	—
10 March 2013	Las Vegas	United States	The Colosseum at Caesars Palace	—	—
12 March 2013	Las Vegas	United States	The Colosseum at Caesars Palace	—	—
13 March 2013	Las Vegas	United States	The Colosseum at Caesars Palace	—	—
15 March 2013	Las Vegas	United States	The Colosseum at Caesars Palace	—	—
16 March 2013	Las Vegas	United States	The Colosseum at Caesars Palace	—	—
Leg 9
4 June 2013	Las Vegas	United States	The Colosseum at Caesars Palace	75,006 / 81,329	$9,904,355
5 June 2013	Las Vegas	United States	The Colosseum at Caesars Palace	75,006 / 81,329	$9,904,355
8 June 2013	Las Vegas	United States	The Colosseum at Caesars Palace	75,006 / 81,329	$9,904,355
9 June 2013	Las Vegas	United States	The Colosseum at Caesars Palace	75,006 / 81,329	$9,904,355
11 June 2013	Las Vegas	United States	The Colosseum at Caesars Palace	75,006 / 81,329	$9,904,355
12 June 2013	Las Vegas	United States	The Colosseum at Caesars Palace	75,006 / 81,329	$9,904,355
15 June 2013	Las Vegas	United States	The Colosseum at Caesars Palace	75,006 / 81,329	$9,904,355
16 June 2013	Las Vegas	United States	The Colosseum at Caesars Palace	75,006 / 81,329	$9,904,355
18 June 2013	Las Vegas	United States	The Colosseum at Caesars Palace	75,006 / 81,329	$9,904,355
19 June 2013	Las Vegas	United States	The Colosseum at Caesars Palace	75,006 / 81,329	$9,904,355
22 June 2013	Las Vegas	United States	The Colosseum at Caesars Palace	75,006 / 81,329	$9,904,355
23 June 2013	Las Vegas	United States	The Colosseum at Caesars Palace	75,006 / 81,329	$9,904,355
25 June 2013	Las Vegas	United States	The Colosseum at Caesars Palace	75,006 / 81,329	$9,904,355
26 June 2013	Las Vegas	United States	The Colosseum at Caesars Palace	75,006 / 81,329	$9,904,355
29 June 2013	Las Vegas	United States	The Colosseum at Caesars Palace	75,006 / 81,329	$9,904,355
30 June 2013	Las Vegas	United States	The Colosseum at Caesars Palace	75,006 / 81,329	$9,904,355
2 July 2013	Las Vegas	United States	The Colosseum at Caesars Palace	75,006 / 81,329	$9,904,355
3 July 2013	Las Vegas	United States	The Colosseum at Caesars Palace	75,006 / 81,329	$9,904,355
5 July 2013	Las Vegas	United States	The Colosseum at Caesars Palace	75,006 / 81,329	$9,904,355
6 July 2013	Las Vegas	United States	The Colosseum at Caesars Palace	75,006 / 81,329	$9,904,355
Leg 10
6 August 2013	Las Vegas	United States	The Colosseum at Caesars Palace	63,900 / 67,670	$9,296,915
7 August 2013	Las Vegas	United States	The Colosseum at Caesars Palace	63,900 / 67,670	$9,296,915
10 August 2013	Las Vegas	United States	The Colosseum at Caesars Palace	63,900 / 67,670	$9,296,915
11 August 2013	Las Vegas	United States	The Colosseum at Caesars Palace	63,900 / 67,670	$9,296,915
13 August 2013	Las Vegas	United States	The Colosseum at Caesars Palace	63,900 / 67,670	$9,296,915
14 August 2013	Las Vegas	United States	The Colosseum at Caesars Palace	63,900 / 67,670	$9,296,915
17 August 2013	Las Vegas	United States	The Colosseum at Caesars Palace	63,900 / 67,670	$9,296,915
18 August 2013	Las Vegas	United States	The Colosseum at Caesars Palace	63,900 / 67,670	$9,296,915
20 August 2013	Las Vegas	United States	The Colosseum at Caesars Palace	63,900 / 67,670	$9,296,915
21 August 2013	Las Vegas	United States	The Colosseum at Caesars Palace	63,900 / 67,670	$9,296,915
24 August 2013	Las Vegas	United States	The Colosseum at Caesars Palace	63,900 / 67,670	$9,296,915
25 August 2013	Las Vegas	United States	The Colosseum at Caesars Palace	63,900 / 67,670	$9,296,915
27 August 2013	Las Vegas	United States	The Colosseum at Caesars Palace	63,900 / 67,670	$9,296,915
28 August 2013	Las Vegas	United States	The Colosseum at Caesars Palace	63,900 / 67,670	$9,296,915
31 August 2013	Las Vegas	United States	The Colosseum at Caesars Palace	63,900 / 67,670	$9,296,915
1 September 2013	Las Vegas	United States	The Colosseum at Caesars Palace	63,900 / 67,670	$9,296,915

=== Legs 11–20 ===
Date	City	Country	Venue	Attendance	Revenue
Leg 11
30 December 2013	Las Vegas	United States	The Colosseum at Caesars Palace	43,009 / 45,740	$6,896,830
31 December 2013	Las Vegas	United States	The Colosseum at Caesars Palace	43,009 / 45,740	$6,896,830
4 January 2014	Las Vegas	United States	The Colosseum at Caesars Palace	43,009 / 45,740	$6,896,830
5 January 2014	Las Vegas	United States	The Colosseum at Caesars Palace	43,009 / 45,740	$6,896,830
8 January 2014	Las Vegas	United States	The Colosseum at Caesars Palace	43,009 / 45,740	$6,896,830
11 January 2014	Las Vegas	United States	The Colosseum at Caesars Palace	43,009 / 45,740	$6,896,830
12 January 2014	Las Vegas	United States	The Colosseum at Caesars Palace	43,009 / 45,740	$6,896,830
14 January 2014	Las Vegas	United States	The Colosseum at Caesars Palace	43,009 / 45,740	$6,896,830
15 January 2014	Las Vegas	United States	The Colosseum at Caesars Palace	43,009 / 45,740	$6,896,830
18 January 2014	Las Vegas	United States	The Colosseum at Caesars Palace	43,009 / 45,740	$6,896,830
19 January 2014	Las Vegas	United States	The Colosseum at Caesars Palace	43,009 / 45,740	$6,896,830
Leg 12
18 February 2014	Las Vegas	United States	The Colosseum at Caesars Palace	71,916 / 75,349	$11,109,595
19 February 2014	Las Vegas	United States	The Colosseum at Caesars Palace	71,916 / 75,349	$11,109,595
21 February 2014	Las Vegas	United States	The Colosseum at Caesars Palace	71,916 / 75,349	$11,109,595
22 February 2014	Las Vegas	United States	The Colosseum at Caesars Palace	71,916 / 75,349	$11,109,595
25 February 2014	Las Vegas	United States	The Colosseum at Caesars Palace	71,916 / 75,349	$11,109,595
26 February 2014	Las Vegas	United States	The Colosseum at Caesars Palace	71,916 / 75,349	$11,109,595
28 February 2014	Las Vegas	United States	The Colosseum at Caesars Palace	71,916 / 75,349	$11,109,595
1 March 2014	Las Vegas	United States	The Colosseum at Caesars Palace	71,916 / 75,349	$11,109,595
4 March 2014	Las Vegas	United States	The Colosseum at Caesars Palace	71,916 / 75,349	$11,109,595
5 March 2014	Las Vegas	United States	The Colosseum at Caesars Palace	71,916 / 75,349	$11,109,595
7 March 2014	Las Vegas	United States	The Colosseum at Caesars Palace	71,916 / 75,349	$11,109,595
8 March 2014	Las Vegas	United States	The Colosseum at Caesars Palace	71,916 / 75,349	$11,109,595
11 March 2014	Las Vegas	United States	The Colosseum at Caesars Palace	71,916 / 75,349	$11,109,595
12 March 2014	Las Vegas	United States	The Colosseum at Caesars Palace	71,916 / 75,349	$11,109,595
14 March 2014	Las Vegas	United States	The Colosseum at Caesars Palace	71,916 / 75,349	$11,109,595
15 March 2014	Las Vegas	United States	The Colosseum at Caesars Palace	71,916 / 75,349	$11,109,595
18 March 2014	Las Vegas	United States	The Colosseum at Caesars Palace	71,916 / 75,349	$11,109,595
19 March 2014	Las Vegas	United States	The Colosseum at Caesars Palace	71,916 / 75,349	$11,109,595
Leg 13
10 June 2014	Las Vegas	United States	The Colosseum at Caesars Palace	51,070 / 57,715	$7,425,208
11 June 2014	Las Vegas	United States	The Colosseum at Caesars Palace	51,070 / 57,715	$7,425,208
14 June 2014	Las Vegas	United States	The Colosseum at Caesars Palace	51,070 / 57,715	$7,425,208
15 June 2014	Las Vegas	United States	The Colosseum at Caesars Palace	51,070 / 57,715	$7,425,208
17 June 2014	Las Vegas	United States	The Colosseum at Caesars Palace	51,070 / 57,715	$7,425,208
18 June 2014	Las Vegas	United States	The Colosseum at Caesars Palace	51,070 / 57,715	$7,425,208
21 June 2014	Las Vegas	United States	The Colosseum at Caesars Palace	51,070 / 57,715	$7,425,208
24 June 2014	Las Vegas	United States	The Colosseum at Caesars Palace	51,070 / 57,715	$7,425,208
25 June 2014	Las Vegas	United States	The Colosseum at Caesars Palace	51,070 / 57,715	$7,425,208
27 June 2014	Las Vegas	United States	The Colosseum at Caesars Palace	51,070 / 57,715	$7,425,208
28 June 2014	Las Vegas	United States	The Colosseum at Caesars Palace	51,070 / 57,715	$7,425,208
1 July 2014	Las Vegas	United States	The Colosseum at Caesars Palace	51,070 / 57,715	$7,425,208
2 July 2014	Las Vegas	United States	The Colosseum at Caesars Palace	51,070 / 57,715	$7,425,208
4 July 2014	Las Vegas	United States	The Colosseum at Caesars Palace	51,070 / 57,715	$7,425,208
Leg 14
29 July 2014	Las Vegas	United States	The Colosseum at Caesars Palace	4,209 / 4,209	$681,005
Leg 15
27 August 2015	Las Vegas	United States	The Colosseum at Caesars Palace	41,606 / 42,212	$6,813,327
29 August 2015	Las Vegas	United States	The Colosseum at Caesars Palace	41,606 / 42,212	$6,813,327
30 August 2015	Las Vegas	United States	The Colosseum at Caesars Palace	41,606 / 42,212	$6,813,327
2 September 2015	Las Vegas	United States	The Colosseum at Caesars Palace	41,606 / 42,212	$6,813,327
4 September 2015	Las Vegas	United States	The Colosseum at Caesars Palace	41,606 / 42,212	$6,813,327
5 September 2015	Las Vegas	United States	The Colosseum at Caesars Palace	41,606 / 42,212	$6,813,327
8 September 2015	Las Vegas	United States	The Colosseum at Caesars Palace	41,606 / 42,212	$6,813,327
9 September 2015	Las Vegas	United States	The Colosseum at Caesars Palace	41,606 / 42,212	$6,813,327
11 September 2015	Las Vegas	United States	The Colosseum at Caesars Palace	41,606 / 42,212	$6,813,327
12 September 2015	Las Vegas	United States	The Colosseum at Caesars Palace	41,606 / 42,212	$6,813,327
Leg 16
29 September 2015	Las Vegas	United States	The Colosseum at Caesars Palace	33,866 / 33,866	$5,565,271
30 September 2015	Las Vegas	United States	The Colosseum at Caesars Palace	33,866 / 33,866	$5,565,271
2 October 2015	Las Vegas	United States	The Colosseum at Caesars Palace	33,866 / 33,866	$5,565,271
3 October 2015	Las Vegas	United States	The Colosseum at Caesars Palace	33,866 / 33,866	$5,565,271
6 October 2015	Las Vegas	United States	The Colosseum at Caesars Palace	33,866 / 33,866	$5,565,271
7 October 2015	Las Vegas	United States	The Colosseum at Caesars Palace	33,866 / 33,866	$5,565,271
9 October 2015	Las Vegas	United States	The Colosseum at Caesars Palace	33,866 / 33,866	$5,565,271
10 October 2015	Las Vegas	United States	The Colosseum at Caesars Palace	33,866 / 33,866	$5,565,271
Leg 17
3 November 2015	Las Vegas	United States	The Colosseum at Caesars Palace	49,993 / 50,924	$8,127,305
4 November 2015	Las Vegas	United States	The Colosseum at Caesars Palace	49,993 / 50,924	$8,127,305
7 November 2015	Las Vegas	United States	The Colosseum at Caesars Palace	49,993 / 50,924	$8,127,305
8 November 2015	Las Vegas	United States	The Colosseum at Caesars Palace	49,993 / 50,924	$8,127,305
10 November 2015	Las Vegas	United States	The Colosseum at Caesars Palace	49,993 / 50,924	$8,127,305
11 November 2015	Las Vegas	United States	The Colosseum at Caesars Palace	49,993 / 50,924	$8,127,305
13 November 2015	Las Vegas	United States	The Colosseum at Caesars Palace	49,993 / 50,924	$8,127,305
14 November 2015	Las Vegas	United States	The Colosseum at Caesars Palace	49,993 / 50,924	$8,127,305
17 November 2015	Las Vegas	United States	The Colosseum at Caesars Palace	49,993 / 50,924	$8,127,305
18 November 2015	Las Vegas	United States	The Colosseum at Caesars Palace	49,993 / 50,924	$8,127,305
20 November 2015	Las Vegas	United States	The Colosseum at Caesars Palace	49,993 / 50,924	$8,127,305
21 November 2015	Las Vegas	United States	The Colosseum at Caesars Palace	49,993 / 50,924	$8,127,305
Leg 18
30 December 2015	Las Vegas	United States	The Colosseum at Caesars Palace	32,648 / 33,132	$5,135,536
31 December 2015	Las Vegas	United States	The Colosseum at Caesars Palace	32,648 / 33,132	$5,135,536
2 January 2016	Las Vegas	United States	The Colosseum at Caesars Palace	32,648 / 33,132	$5,135,536
6 January 2016	Las Vegas	United States	The Colosseum at Caesars Palace	32,648 / 33,132	$5,135,536
9 January 2016	Las Vegas	United States	The Colosseum at Caesars Palace	32,648 / 33,132	$5,135,536
10 January 2016	Las Vegas	United States	The Colosseum at Caesars Palace	32,648 / 33,132	$5,135,536
12 January 2016	Las Vegas	United States	The Colosseum at Caesars Palace	32,648 / 33,132	$5,135,536
13 January 2016	Las Vegas	United States	The Colosseum at Caesars Palace	32,648 / 33,132	$5,135,536
Leg 19
23 February 2016	Las Vegas	United States	The Colosseum at Caesars Palace	47,336 / 49,702	$7,357,980
24 February 2016	Las Vegas	United States	The Colosseum at Caesars Palace	47,336 / 49,702	$7,357,980
26 February 2016	Las Vegas	United States	The Colosseum at Caesars Palace	47,336 / 49,702	$7,357,980
27 February 2016	Las Vegas	United States	The Colosseum at Caesars Palace	47,336 / 49,702	$7,357,980
1 March 2016	Las Vegas	United States	The Colosseum at Caesars Palace	47,336 / 49,702	$7,357,980
2 March 2016	Las Vegas	United States	The Colosseum at Caesars Palace	47,336 / 49,702	$7,357,980
4 March 2016	Las Vegas	United States	The Colosseum at Caesars Palace	47,336 / 49,702	$7,357,980
5 March 2016	Las Vegas	United States	The Colosseum at Caesars Palace	47,336 / 49,702	$7,357,980
8 March 2016	Las Vegas	United States	The Colosseum at Caesars Palace	47,336 / 49,702	$7,357,980
9 March 2016	Las Vegas	United States	The Colosseum at Caesars Palace	47,336 / 49,702	$7,357,980
11 March 2016	Las Vegas	United States	The Colosseum at Caesars Palace	47,336 / 49,702	$7,357,980
12 March 2016	Las Vegas	United States	The Colosseum at Caesars Palace	47,336 / 49,702	$7,357,980
Leg 20
17 May 2016	Las Vegas	United States	The Colosseum at Caesars Palace	46,706 / 46,706	$7,683,545
18 May 2016	Las Vegas	United States	The Colosseum at Caesars Palace	46,706 / 46,706	$7,683,545
20 May 2016	Las Vegas	United States	The Colosseum at Caesars Palace	46,706 / 46,706	$7,683,545
21 May 2016	Las Vegas	United States	The Colosseum at Caesars Palace	46,706 / 46,706	$7,683,545
24 May 2016	Las Vegas	United States	The Colosseum at Caesars Palace	46,706 / 46,706	$7,683,545
27 May 2016	Las Vegas	United States	The Colosseum at Caesars Palace	46,706 / 46,706	$7,683,545
28 May 2016	Las Vegas	United States	The Colosseum at Caesars Palace	46,706 / 46,706	$7,683,545
31 May 2016	Las Vegas	United States	The Colosseum at Caesars Palace	46,706 / 46,706	$7,683,545
1 June 2016	Las Vegas	United States	The Colosseum at Caesars Palace	46,706 / 46,706	$7,683,545
3 June 2016	Las Vegas	United States	The Colosseum at Caesars Palace	46,706 / 46,706	$7,683,545
4 June 2016	Las Vegas	United States	The Colosseum at Caesars Palace	46,706 / 46,706	$7,683,545

=== Legs 21–33 ===
Date	City	Country	Venue	Attendance	Revenue
Leg 21
20 September 2016	Las Vegas	United States	The Colosseum at Caesars Palace	50,916 / 50,916	$8,427,700
21 September 2016	Las Vegas	United States	The Colosseum at Caesars Palace	50,916 / 50,916	$8,427,700
23 September 2016	Las Vegas	United States	The Colosseum at Caesars Palace	50,916 / 50,916	$8,427,700
24 September 2016	Las Vegas	United States	The Colosseum at Caesars Palace	50,916 / 50,916	$8,427,700
27 September 2016	Las Vegas	United States	The Colosseum at Caesars Palace	50,916 / 50,916	$8,427,700
28 September 2016	Las Vegas	United States	The Colosseum at Caesars Palace	50,916 / 50,916	$8,427,700
30 September 2016	Las Vegas	United States	The Colosseum at Caesars Palace	50,916 / 50,916	$8,427,700
1 October 2016	Las Vegas	United States	The Colosseum at Caesars Palace	50,916 / 50,916	$8,427,700
4 October 2016	Las Vegas	United States	The Colosseum at Caesars Palace	50,916 / 50,916	$8,427,700
5 October 2016	Las Vegas	United States	The Colosseum at Caesars Palace	50,916 / 50,916	$8,427,700
7 October 2016	Las Vegas	United States	The Colosseum at Caesars Palace	50,916 / 50,916	$8,427,700
8 October 2016	Las Vegas	United States	The Colosseum at Caesars Palace	50,916 / 50,916	$8,427,700
Leg 22
1 November 2016	Las Vegas	United States	The Colosseum at Caesars Palace	40,658 / 42,080	$6,541,620
2 November 2016	Las Vegas	United States	The Colosseum at Caesars Palace	40,658 / 42,080	$6,541,620
4 November 2016	Las Vegas	United States	The Colosseum at Caesars Palace	40,658 / 42,080	$6,541,620
15 November 2016	Las Vegas	United States	The Colosseum at Caesars Palace	40,658 / 42,080	$6,541,620
16 November 2016	Las Vegas	United States	The Colosseum at Caesars Palace	40,658 / 42,080	$6,541,620
18 November 2016	Las Vegas	United States	The Colosseum at Caesars Palace	40,658 / 42,080	$6,541,620
19 November 2016	Las Vegas	United States	The Colosseum at Caesars Palace	40,658 / 42,080	$6,541,620
22 November 2016	Las Vegas	United States	The Colosseum at Caesars Palace	40,658 / 42,080	$6,541,620
25 November 2016	Las Vegas	United States	The Colosseum at Caesars Palace	40,658 / 42,080	$6,541,620
26 November 2016	Las Vegas	United States	The Colosseum at Caesars Palace	40,658 / 42,080	$6,541,620
Leg 23
17 January 2017	Las Vegas	United States	The Colosseum at Caesars Palace	47,886 / 50,452	$7,852,845
18 January 2017	Las Vegas	United States	The Colosseum at Caesars Palace	47,886 / 50,452	$7,852,845
20 January 2017	Las Vegas	United States	The Colosseum at Caesars Palace	47,886 / 50,452	$7,852,845
21 January 2017	Las Vegas	United States	The Colosseum at Caesars Palace	47,886 / 50,452	$7,852,845
24 January 2017	Las Vegas	United States	The Colosseum at Caesars Palace	47,886 / 50,452	$7,852,845
25 January 2017	Las Vegas	United States	The Colosseum at Caesars Palace	47,886 / 50,452	$7,852,845
27 January 2017	Las Vegas	United States	The Colosseum at Caesars Palace	47,886 / 50,452	$7,852,845
28 January 2017	Las Vegas	United States	The Colosseum at Caesars Palace	47,886 / 50,452	$7,852,845
31 January 2017	Las Vegas	United States	The Colosseum at Caesars Palace	47,886 / 50,452	$7,852,845
1 February 2017	Las Vegas	United States	The Colosseum at Caesars Palace	47,886 / 50,452	$7,852,845
3 February 2017	Las Vegas	United States	The Colosseum at Caesars Palace	47,886 / 50,452	$7,852,845
4 February 2017	Las Vegas	United States	The Colosseum at Caesars Palace	47,886 / 50,452	$7,852,845
Leg 24
4 April 2017	Las Vegas	United States	The Colosseum at Caesars Palace	50,227 / 50,989	$8,579,400
5 April 2017	Las Vegas	United States	The Colosseum at Caesars Palace	50,227 / 50,989	$8,579,400
7 April 2017	Las Vegas	United States	The Colosseum at Caesars Palace	50,227 / 50,989	$8,579,400
8 April 2017	Las Vegas	United States	The Colosseum at Caesars Palace	50,227 / 50,989	$8,579,400
11 April 2017	Las Vegas	United States	The Colosseum at Caesars Palace	50,227 / 50,989	$8,579,400
12 April 2017	Las Vegas	United States	The Colosseum at Caesars Palace	50,227 / 50,989	$8,579,400
14 April 2017	Las Vegas	United States	The Colosseum at Caesars Palace	50,227 / 50,989	$8,579,400
15 April 2017	Las Vegas	United States	The Colosseum at Caesars Palace	50,227 / 50,989	$8,579,400
18 April 2017	Las Vegas	United States	The Colosseum at Caesars Palace	50,227 / 50,989	$8,579,400
19 April 2017	Las Vegas	United States	The Colosseum at Caesars Palace	50,227 / 50,989	$8,579,400
21 April 2017	Las Vegas	United States	The Colosseum at Caesars Palace	50,227 / 50,989	$8,579,400
22 April 2017	Las Vegas	United States	The Colosseum at Caesars Palace	50,227 / 50,989	$8,579,400
Leg 25
9 May 2017	Las Vegas	United States	The Colosseum at Caesars Palace	61,296 / 63,207	$10,395,450
12 May 2017	Las Vegas	United States	The Colosseum at Caesars Palace	61,296 / 63,207	$10,395,450
13 May 2017	Las Vegas	United States	The Colosseum at Caesars Palace	61,296 / 63,207	$10,395,450
16 May 2017	Las Vegas	United States	The Colosseum at Caesars Palace	61,296 / 63,207	$10,395,450
17 May 2017	Las Vegas	United States	The Colosseum at Caesars Palace	61,296 / 63,207	$10,395,450
19 May 2017	Las Vegas	United States	The Colosseum at Caesars Palace	61,296 / 63,207	$10,395,450
20 May 2017	Las Vegas	United States	The Colosseum at Caesars Palace	61,296 / 63,207	$10,395,450
23 May 2017	Las Vegas	United States	The Colosseum at Caesars Palace	61,296 / 63,207	$10,395,450
24 May 2017	Las Vegas	United States	The Colosseum at Caesars Palace	61,296 / 63,207	$10,395,450
27 May 2017	Las Vegas	United States	The Colosseum at Caesars Palace	61,296 / 63,207	$10,395,450
28 May 2017	Las Vegas	United States	The Colosseum at Caesars Palace	61,296 / 63,207	$10,395,450
30 May 2017	Las Vegas	United States	The Colosseum at Caesars Palace	61,296 / 63,207	$10,395,450
31 May 2017	Las Vegas	United States	The Colosseum at Caesars Palace	61,296 / 63,207	$10,395,450
2 June 2017	Las Vegas	United States	The Colosseum at Caesars Palace	61,296 / 63,207	$10,395,450
3 June 2017	Las Vegas	United States	The Colosseum at Caesars Palace	61,296 / 63,207	$10,395,450
Leg 26
19 September 2017	Las Vegas	United States	The Colosseum at Caesars Palace	48,902 / 50,951	$8,336,580
20 September 2017	Las Vegas	United States	The Colosseum at Caesars Palace	48,902 / 50,951	$8,336,580
22 September 2017	Las Vegas	United States	The Colosseum at Caesars Palace	48,902 / 50,951	$8,336,580
23 September 2017	Las Vegas	United States	The Colosseum at Caesars Palace	48,902 / 50,951	$8,336,580
26 September 2017	Las Vegas	United States	The Colosseum at Caesars Palace	48,902 / 50,951	$8,336,580
27 September 2017	Las Vegas	United States	The Colosseum at Caesars Palace	48,902 / 50,951	$8,336,580
29 September 2017	Las Vegas	United States	The Colosseum at Caesars Palace	48,902 / 50,951	$8,336,580
30 September 2017	Las Vegas	United States	The Colosseum at Caesars Palace	48,902 / 50,951	$8,336,580
3 October 2017	Las Vegas	United States	The Colosseum at Caesars Palace	48,902 / 50,951	$8,336,580
4 October 2017	Las Vegas	United States	The Colosseum at Caesars Palace	48,902 / 50,951	$8,336,580
6 October 2017	Las Vegas	United States	The Colosseum at Caesars Palace	48,902 / 50,951	$8,336,580
7 October 2017	Las Vegas	United States	The Colosseum at Caesars Palace	48,902 / 50,951	$8,336,580
Leg 27
7 November 2017	Las Vegas	United States	The Colosseum at Caesars Palace	45,304 / 46,387	$7,504,573
8 November 2017	Las Vegas	United States	The Colosseum at Caesars Palace	45,304 / 46,387	$7,504,573
10 November 2017	Las Vegas	United States	The Colosseum at Caesars Palace	45,304 / 46,387	$7,504,573
11 November 2017	Las Vegas	United States	The Colosseum at Caesars Palace	45,304 / 46,387	$7,504,573
14 November 2017	Las Vegas	United States	The Colosseum at Caesars Palace	45,304 / 46,387	$7,504,573
15 November 2017	Las Vegas	United States	The Colosseum at Caesars Palace	45,304 / 46,387	$7,504,573
17 November 2017	Las Vegas	United States	The Colosseum at Caesars Palace	45,304 / 46,387	$7,504,573
18 November 2017	Las Vegas	United States	The Colosseum at Caesars Palace	45,304 / 46,387	$7,504,573
21 November 2017	Las Vegas	United States	The Colosseum at Caesars Palace	45,304 / 46,387	$7,504,573
24 November 2017	Las Vegas	United States	The Colosseum at Caesars Palace	45,304 / 46,387	$7,504,573
25 November 2017	Las Vegas	United States	The Colosseum at Caesars Palace	45,304 / 46,387	$7,504,573
Leg 28
30 December 2017	Las Vegas	United States	The Colosseum at Caesars Palace	8,372 / 8,372	$1,953,280
31 December 2017	Las Vegas	United States	The Colosseum at Caesars Palace	8,372 / 8,372	$1,953,280
2 January 2018	Las Vegas	United States	The Colosseum at Caesars Palace	16,259 / 16,981	$2,691,220
3 January 2018	Las Vegas	United States	The Colosseum at Caesars Palace	16,259 / 16,981	$2,691,220
5 January 2018	Las Vegas	United States	The Colosseum at Caesars Palace	16,259 / 16,981	$2,691,220
12 January 2018	Las Vegas	United States	The Colosseum at Caesars Palace	16,259 / 16,981	$2,691,220
Leg 29
22 May 2018	Las Vegas	United States	The Colosseum at Caesars Palace	47,053 / 50,481	$7,839,143
23 May 2018	Las Vegas	United States	The Colosseum at Caesars Palace	47,053 / 50,481	$7,839,143
25 May 2018	Las Vegas	United States	The Colosseum at Caesars Palace	47,053 / 50,481	$7,839,143
26 May 2018	Las Vegas	United States	The Colosseum at Caesars Palace	47,053 / 50,481	$7,839,143
29 May 2018	Las Vegas	United States	The Colosseum at Caesars Palace	47,053 / 50,481	$7,839,143
30 May 2018	Las Vegas	United States	The Colosseum at Caesars Palace	47,053 / 50,481	$7,839,143
1 June 2018	Las Vegas	United States	The Colosseum at Caesars Palace	47,053 / 50,481	$7,839,143
2 June 2018	Las Vegas	United States	The Colosseum at Caesars Palace	47,053 / 50,481	$7,839,143
5 June 2018	Las Vegas	United States	The Colosseum at Caesars Palace	47,053 / 50,481	$7,839,143
6 June 2018	Las Vegas	United States	The Colosseum at Caesars Palace	47,053 / 50,481	$7,839,143
8 June 2018	Las Vegas	United States	The Colosseum at Caesars Palace	47,053 / 50,481	$7,839,143
9 June 2018	Las Vegas	United States	The Colosseum at Caesars Palace	47,053 / 50,481	$7,839,143
Leg 30
30 October 2018	Las Vegas	United States	The Colosseum at Caesars Palace	—	—
31 October 2018	Las Vegas	United States	The Colosseum at Caesars Palace	—	—
2 November 2018	Las Vegas	United States	The Colosseum at Caesars Palace	—	—
3 November 2018	Las Vegas	United States	The Colosseum at Caesars Palace	—	—
6 November 2018	Las Vegas	United States	The Colosseum at Caesars Palace	—	—
7 November 2018	Las Vegas	United States	The Colosseum at Caesars Palace	—	—
9 November 2018	Las Vegas	United States	The Colosseum at Caesars Palace	—	—
10 November 2018	Las Vegas	United States	The Colosseum at Caesars Palace	—	—
13 November 2018	Las Vegas	United States	The Colosseum at Caesars Palace	—	—
14 November 2018	Las Vegas	United States	The Colosseum at Caesars Palace	—	—
16 November 2018	Las Vegas	United States	The Colosseum at Caesars Palace	—	—
17 November 2018	Las Vegas	United States	The Colosseum at Caesars Palace	—	—
Leg 31
28 December 2018	Las Vegas	United States	The Colosseum at Caesars Palace	—	—
29 December 2018	Las Vegas	United States	The Colosseum at Caesars Palace	—	—
31 December 2018	Las Vegas	United States	The Colosseum at Caesars Palace	—	—
2 January 2019	Las Vegas	United States	The Colosseum at Caesars Palace	—	—
4 January 2019	Las Vegas	United States	The Colosseum at Caesars Palace	—	—
5 January 2019	Las Vegas	United States	The Colosseum at Caesars Palace	—	—
8 January 2019	Las Vegas	United States	The Colosseum at Caesars Palace	—	—
11 January 2019	Las Vegas	United States	The Colosseum at Caesars Palace	—	—
15 January 2019	Las Vegas	United States	The Colosseum at Caesars Palace	—	—
16 January 2019	Las Vegas	United States	The Colosseum at Caesars Palace	—	—
19 January 2019	Las Vegas	United States	The Colosseum at Caesars Palace	—	—
20 January 2019	Las Vegas	United States	The Colosseum at Caesars Palace	—	—
Leg 32
26 February 2019	Las Vegas	United States	The Colosseum at Caesars Palace	—	—
27 February 2019	Las Vegas	United States	The Colosseum at Caesars Palace	—	—
1 March 2019	Las Vegas	United States	The Colosseum at Caesars Palace	42,712 / 42,840	$7,894,048
2 March 2019	Las Vegas	United States	The Colosseum at Caesars Palace	42,712 / 42,840	$7,894,048
5 March 2019	Las Vegas	United States	The Colosseum at Caesars Palace	42,712 / 42,840	$7,894,048
6 March 2019	Las Vegas	United States	The Colosseum at Caesars Palace	42,712 / 42,840	$7,894,048
8 March 2019	Las Vegas	United States	The Colosseum at Caesars Palace	42,712 / 42,840	$7,894,048
9 March 2019	Las Vegas	United States	The Colosseum at Caesars Palace	42,712 / 42,840	$7,894,048
12 March 2019	Las Vegas	United States	The Colosseum at Caesars Palace	42,712 / 42,840	$7,894,048
13 March 2019	Las Vegas	United States	The Colosseum at Caesars Palace	42,712 / 42,840	$7,894,048
15 March 2019	Las Vegas	United States	The Colosseum at Caesars Palace	42,712 / 42,840	$7,894,048
16 March 2019	Las Vegas	United States	The Colosseum at Caesars Palace	42,712 / 42,840	$7,894,048
Leg 33
14 May 2019	Las Vegas	United States	The Colosseum at Caesars Palace	67,893 / 67,893	$18,899,163
15 May 2019	Las Vegas	United States	The Colosseum at Caesars Palace	67,893 / 67,893	$18,899,163
17 May 2019	Las Vegas	United States	The Colosseum at Caesars Palace	67,893 / 67,893	$18,899,163
18 May 2019	Las Vegas	United States	The Colosseum at Caesars Palace	67,893 / 67,893	$18,899,163
21 May 2019	Las Vegas	United States	The Colosseum at Caesars Palace	67,893 / 67,893	$18,899,163
22 May 2019	Las Vegas	United States	The Colosseum at Caesars Palace	67,893 / 67,893	$18,899,163
24 May 2019	Las Vegas	United States	The Colosseum at Caesars Palace	67,893 / 67,893	$18,899,163
25 May 2019	Las Vegas	United States	The Colosseum at Caesars Palace	67,893 / 67,893	$18,899,163
28 May 2019	Las Vegas	United States	The Colosseum at Caesars Palace	67,893 / 67,893	$18,899,163
29 May 2019	Las Vegas	United States	The Colosseum at Caesars Palace	67,893 / 67,893	$18,899,163
31 May 2019	Las Vegas	United States	The Colosseum at Caesars Palace	67,893 / 67,893	$18,899,163
1 June 2019	Las Vegas	United States	The Colosseum at Caesars Palace	67,893 / 67,893	$18,899,163
4 June 2019	Las Vegas	United States	The Colosseum at Caesars Palace	67,893 / 67,893	$18,899,163
5 June 2019	Las Vegas	United States	The Colosseum at Caesars Palace	67,893 / 67,893	$18,899,163
7 June 2019	Las Vegas	United States	The Colosseum at Caesars Palace	67,893 / 67,893	$18,899,163
8 June 2019	Las Vegas	United States	The Colosseum at Caesars Palace	67,893 / 67,893	$18,899,163
Total				1,631,060 / 1,681,267 (97.01%)	$272,306,248

== Cancelled shows ==
List of cancelled concerts, showing date, and reason for cancellation
Date	Reason
22 February 2012	Vocal rest
25 February 2012	Vocal rest
26 February 2012	Vocal rest
28 February 2012	Vocal rest
29 February 2012	Vocal rest
3 March 2012	Vocal rest
4 March 2012	Vocal rest
6 March 2012	Vocal rest
7 March 2012	Vocal rest
10 March 2012	Vocal rest
11 March 2012	Vocal rest
13 March 2012	Vocal rest
14 March 2012	Vocal rest
16 March 2012	Vocal rest
17 March 2012	Vocal rest
18 March 2012	Vocal rest
19 February 2013	Sinus infection
20 February 2013	Sinus infection
22 February 2013	Sinus infection
5 July 2014	Sinus infection
30 July 2014	Vocal cord inflammation
1 August 2014	Vocal cord inflammation
2 August 2014	Vocal cord inflammation
5 August 2014	Vocal cord inflammation
6 August 2014	Vocal cord inflammation
8 August 2014	Vocal cord inflammation
9 August 2014	Vocal cord inflammation
12 August 2014	Vocal cord inflammation
13 August 2014	Vocal cord inflammation
15 August 2014 – 22 March 2015	Family health
16 January 2016	Deaths of husband René Angélil and brother Daniel Dion in January 2016
17 January 2016	Deaths of husband René Angélil and brother Daniel Dion in January 2016
5 November 2016	Viral Infection
7 November 2016	Viral Infection
9 November 2016	Viral Infection
11 November 2016	Viral Infection
12 November 2016	Viral Infection
22 November 2017	Lower back spasms
6 January 2018	Throat inflammation
9 January 2018	Throat inflammation
13 January 2018	Throat inflammation
16 January 2018	Throat inflammation
17 January 2018	Throat inflammation
19 January 2018	Throat inflammation
20 January 2018	Throat inflammation
27 March 2018	Patulous Eustachian tube surgery
28 March 2018	Patulous Eustachian tube surgery
30 March 2018	Patulous Eustachian tube surgery
31 March 2018	Patulous Eustachian tube surgery
3 April 2018	Patulous Eustachian tube surgery
4 April 2018	Patulous Eustachian tube surgery
6 April 2018	Patulous Eustachian tube surgery
7 April 2018	Patulous Eustachian tube surgery
10 April 2018	Patulous Eustachian tube surgery
11 April 2018	Patulous Eustachian tube surgery
13 April 2018	Patulous Eustachian tube surgery
14 April 2018	Patulous Eustachian tube surgery
17 April 2018	Patulous Eustachian tube surgery
18 April 2018	Patulous Eustachian tube surgery

== Band ==
- Claude "Mégo" Lemay – musical director, piano (2011–2014)
- Scott Price – musical director, piano (2015–2019)
- Marc Langis – bass (2011–2014)
- Yves Labonté – bass (2015–2019)
- André Coutu – guitars (2011–2014)
- Kaven Girouard – guitars (2015–2019)
- Yves Frulla – keyboards (2011–2014)
- Guillaume Marchand – keyboards (2015–2019)
- Dominique Messier – drums
- Paul Picard – percussion
- Élise Duguay – background vocals, tin whistle, cello
- Barnev Valsaint – background vocals
- Dawn Cumberbatch – background vocals
- Jean Sebastien Carré – violin (2011–2014)
- Philippe Dunnigan – violin
- Jenny Elfving – violin
- Laraine Kaizer – violin
- Rebecca Ramsey – violin
- Svetlin Belneev – violin
- Lisa Dondlinger – violin
- Lenka Hajkova – violin
- John Arnold – violin
- De Ann Letourneau – violin
- Jerome Gordon – viola
- Kaila Potts – viola
- Dmitri Kourka – viola
- Lindsey Springer – cello
- Raymond Sicam III – cello
- Irina Chirkova – cello
- Judy Kang – cello
- Eric Tewalt – woodwinds
- Philip Wigfall – woodwinds
- Daniel Falcone – trumpet
- Matt Fronke – trumpet
- Kurt Evanson – trumpet
- Nico Edgerman – trumpet
- Donald Lorice – trumpet
- Nathan Tanouye – trombone

== See also ==
- List of highest-grossing concert series at a single venue
- List of most-attended concert series at a single venue
