= Let's Talk About Love / Falling into You / A New Day Has Come =

Box set by Celine Dion
- Released: 29 October 2007
- Recorded: 1995–2002
- Genre: Pop
- Labels: Columbia; Epic
- Producers: Walter Afanasieff; Peer Åström; Christian B.; Anders Bagge; Arnthor Birgisson; Roy Bittan; Jeff Bova; Andreas Carlsson; Marc Dold; Simon Franglen; David Foster; Humberto Gatica; Jean-Jacques Goldman; Rick Hahn; Corey Hart; Dan Hill; James Horner; John Jones; Richie Jones; Robert John "Mutt" Lange; Kristian Lundin; Vito Luprano; Steve Morales; Christopher Neil; George Martin; Rick Nowels; Aldo Nova; Billy Pace; Gérald De Palmas; Tony Renis; Steven Rinkoff; Billy Steinberg; Jim Steinman; Ric Wake

Celine Dion chronology
D'elles (2007)	Let's Talk About Love / Falling into You / A New Day Has Come (2007)	Taking Chances (2007)

Let's Talk About Love / Falling into You / A New Day Has Come is a three-CD box set by Canadian singer Celine Dion, released on 29 October 2007 by Columbia Records and Epic Records. It was reissued as The Collection on 29 September 2009, and as Original Album Classics on 26 July 2010.

== Content ==
The box set contains three of Dion's best-selling studio albums: Let's Talk About Love, Falling into You, and A New Day Has Come, presented in a deluxe package. It is housed in a digipak picture sleeve and includes a 16-page booklet. The track list corresponds to the US editions of the three albums.

== Critical reception ==
James Christopher Monger of AllMusic gave the album three and a half out of five stars. He wrote that the three-disc set includes Falling into You (1996), Let's Talk About Love (1997), and A New Day Has Come (2002) in full, noting that although the release offers no additional material beyond the cardboard sleeve, the albums "decently and dutifully represent" Dion's most successful period.

== Commercial performance ==
Let's Talk About Love / Falling into You / A New Day Has Come first entered the charts in Canada and Belgium in November 2007, reaching number 97 on the Canadian Albums Chart and number 20 on the Belgian Ultratop Wallonia Mid Price Albums Chart. In May 2008, it debuted on the charts in the United Kingdom and Sweden, peaking at number 106 on the UK Albums Chart and number 95 on the Scottish Albums Chart.

In Sweden, the album reached number three and was certified gold for sales of 20,000 copies. It was the 41st best-selling album in Sweden in 2008. Owing to its performance there, the box set also entered the European Top 100 Albums chart, where it peaked at number 74. In April 2010, it appeared on the Norwegian Mid Price Albums Chart, reaching number five.

== Track listing ==
Falling into You (disc one)
No.	Title	Writer(s)	Producer(s)	Length
1.	"It's All Coming Back to Me Now"	Jim Steinman	Steinman; Steven Rinkoff; Roy Bittan	7:37
2.	"Because You Loved Me"	Diane Warren	David Foster	4:33
3.	"Falling into You"	Billy Steinberg; Rick Nowels; Marie-Claire D'Ubaldo	Nowels; Steinberg	4:18
4.	"Make You Happy"	Andy Marvel	Ric Wake	4:31
5.	"Seduces Me"	Dan Hill; John Sheard	Rick Hahn; Hill; John Jones	3:46
6.	"All by Myself"	Eric Carmen; Sergei Rachmaninoff	Foster	5:12
7.	"Declaration of Love"	Michael Jay; Claude Gaudette	Wake	4:20
8.	"Dreamin' of You"	Aldo Nova; Peter Barbeau	Nova	5:07
9.	"I Love You"	Nova	Foster	5:30
10.	"If That's What It Takes"	Jean-Jacques Goldman; Phil Galdston	Goldman; Humberto Gatica	4:12
11.	"I Don't Know"	Goldman; J. Kapler; Galdston	Goldman; Gatica	4:38
12.	"River Deep, Mountain High"	Ellie Greenwich; Jeff Barry; Phil Spector	Steinman; Rinkoff	4:10
13.	"Call the Man"	Andy Hill; Peter Sinfield	Steinman; Rinkoff; Jeff Bova	6:08
14.	"Fly"	Goldman; Galdston	Goldman; Gatica	2:58
Total length:				67:00

A New Day Has Come (disc two)
No.	Title	Writer(s)	Producer(s)	Length
1.	"I'm Alive"	Kristian Lundin; Andreas Carlsson	Lundin; Wake; Richie Jones	3:30
2.	"Right in Front of You"	Steve Morales; Sheppard Solomon; Kara DioGuardi; David Siegel	Morales	4:13
3.	"Have You Ever Been in Love"	Anders Bagge; Peer Åström; Tom Nichols; Daryl Hall; Laila Bagge	Bagge; Åström	4:08
4.	"Rain, Tax (It's Inevitable)"	Terry Britten; Charlie Dore	Christopher Neil	3:25
5.	"A New Day Has Come" (radio remix)	Nova; Stephan Moccio	Wake; Walter Afanasieff; Nova; Jones; Christian B.; Marc Dold	4:23
6.	"Ten Days"	Nova; Maxime Le Forestier; Gérald de Palmas	Palmas	3:37
7.	"Goodbye's (The Saddest Word)"	Robert John "Mutt" Lange	Lange	5:19
8.	"Prayer"	Corey Hart	Afanasieff	5:34
9.	"I Surrender"	Louis Biancaniello; Sam Watters	Simon Franglen	4:47
10.	"At Last"	Mack Gordon; Harry Warren	Gatica; Guy Roche	4:17
11.	"Sorry for Love"	DioGuardi; Bagge; Åström; Arnthor Birgisson	Bagge; Åström; Birgisson	4:10
12.	"Aun Existe Amor"	Riccardo Cocciante; Ignacio Ballesteros-Diaz	Gatica; Vito Luprano	3:52
13.	"The Greatest Reward"	Pascal Obispo; Carlsson; Jörgen Elofsson; Lionel Florence; Patrice Guirao	Lundin; Carlsson	3:28
14.	"When the Wrong One Loves You Right"	Martin Briley; Francis Galluccio; Marjorie Maye	Wake; Jones	3:48
15.	"A New Day Has Come"	Nova; Moccio	Afanasieff; Nova	5:42
16.	"Nature Boy"	eden ahbez	Afanasieff	3:45
Total length:				67:58

Let's Talk About Love (disc three)
No.	Title	Writer(s)	Producer(s)	Length
1.	"The Reason"	Carole King; Mark Hudson; Greg Wells	George Martin	5:01
2.	"Immortality" (with the Bee Gees)	Barry Gibb; Robin Gibb; Maurice Gibb	Afanasieff	4:11
3.	"Treat Her Like a Lady"	Diana King; Marvel; Billy Mann; Celine Dion	Wake	4:05
4.	"Why Oh Why"	Marti Sharron; Dan Sembello	Foster	4:50
5.	"Love Is on the Way"	Peter Zizzo; Denise Rich; Tina Shafer	Wake	4:25
6.	"Tell Him" (with Barbra Streisand)	Linda Thompson; Afanasieff; Foster	Foster; Afanasieff	4:51
7.	"Where Is the Love"	Hart	Hart	4:55
8.	"When I Need You"	Albert Hammond; Carole Bayer Sager	Foster	4:12
9.	"Miles to Go (Before I Sleep)"	Hart	Hart	4:40
10.	"Us"	Billy Pace	Gatica; Pace; Steinman	5:47
11.	"Just a Little Bit of Love"	Maria Christensen; Arnie Roman; Arthur Jacobson	Wake	4:06
12.	"My Heart Will Go On"	James Horner; Will Jennings	Afanasieff; Horner	4:40
13.	"I Hate You Then I Love You" (with Luciano Pavarotti)	Tony Renis; Manuel de Falla; Alberto Testa; Fabio Testa; Norman Newell	Foster; Gatica; Renis	4:43
14.	"To Love You More"	Foster; Junior Miles	Foster	5:28
15.	"Let's Talk About Love"	Bryan Adams; Goldman; Eliot Kennedy	Foster	5:12
Total length:				71:06

== Charts ==
=== Weekly charts ===
Weekly chart performance
Chart (2007–2010)	Peak position
Belgian Albums Mid Price (Ultratop Wallonia)	20
Canadian Albums (Billboard)	97
European Albums (Music & Media)	74
Norwegian Mid Price Albums (VG-lista)	5
Scottish Albums (Official Charts)	95
Swedish Albums (Sverigetopplistan)	3
UK Albums (OCC)	106

=== Year-end charts ===
Year-end chart performance
Chart (2008)	Position
Swedish Albums (Sverigetopplistan)	41

== Certifications ==
Certifications
Region	Certification	Certified units/sales
Sweden (GLF)	Gold	20,000^{^}
^{^} Shipments figures based on certification alone.

== Release history ==
Release history
Region	Date	Label	Format	Catalog
United Kingdom	29 October 2007	Columbia	CD	88697185162
Europe	12 November 2007	Columbia	CD	88697185162
Canada	13 November 2007	Columbia	CD	88697185162
Australia	8 December 2007	Columbia	CD	88697185162
United States	29 January 2008	Columbia	CD	88697185162
