= All the Way... A Decade of Song & Video =

Video by Celine Dion
- Released: 20 February 2001
- Recorded: 1992–2000
- Genre: Pop
- Length: 90:00
- Label: Columbia; Epic
- Producer: Jim Gable

Celine Dion chronology
Au cœur du stade (1999)	All the Way... A Decade of Song & Video (2001)	On ne change pas (2005)

Professional ratings
Review scores
Source	Rating
AllMusic	4/5 stars

All the Way... A Decade of Song & Video is the sixth home video by Canadian singer Celine Dion, released on 20 February 2001 by Columbia Records and Epic Records in both VHS and DVD formats. Conceived as a visual companion to Dion's 1999 greatest hits album All the Way... A Decade of Song, the collection assembles her English‑language music videos and selected live performances from the 1990s. It includes nine of her best‑known recordings alongside seven newly added videos.

== Content ==
The compilation presents several of Dion's most widely recognized songs, including "My Heart Will Go On", "Because You Loved Me", "Beauty and the Beast", and "I'm Your Angel". Newly added material includes Dion's interpretation of "The First Time Ever I Saw Your Face" and "If Walls Could Talk", a Mutt Lange composition with background vocals by Shania Twain. The latter video had not been released prior to this collection. The program also includes "Then You Look at Me", the theme from Bicentennial Man, which reunited Dion with composer James Horner. The DVD edition adds one bonus video and supplementary content.

"Beauty and the Beast", "Because You Loved Me", and "To Love You More" were sourced from the ...Live in Memphis 1997 home video. "The First Time Ever I Saw Your Face" and "All the Way" originate from Dion's 1999 CBS television special All the Way... A Decade of Song.

== Commercial performance ==
All the Way... A Decade of Song & Video spent 47 weeks on the Top Music Video chart in the United States, peaking at number 15. It was certified platinum by the RIAA for shipments of 100,000 copies. According to Nielsen SoundScan, the release had sold more than 300,000 copies in the United States by May 2010, making it eligible for triple platinum certification. The video also reached number three on the Australian Music DVD chart and was certified eight times platinum, with sales of 120,000 units. In the United Kingdom, it received a platinum certification after surpassing 50,000 copies.

== Track listing ==
No.	Title	Director(s)	Length
1.	"Program start"
2.	"The Power of Love"	Randee St. Nicholas
3.	"If You Asked Me To"	Dominic Orlando
4.	"Misled"	St. Nicholas
5.	"Beauty and the Beast" (with Terry Bradford; from ...Live in Memphis 1997)	Bud Schaetzle
6.	"Because You Loved Me" (from ...Live in Memphis 1997)	Schaetzle
7.	"It's All Coming Back to Me Now" (single version)	Nigel Dick
8.	"Love Can Move Mountains"	Jeb Brian
9.	"To Love You More" (with Taro Hakase; from ...Live in Memphis 1997)	Schaetzle
10.	"My Heart Will Go On"	Bille Woodruff
11.	"I'm Your Angel" (with R. Kelly)	Woodruff
12.	"That's the Way It Is"	Liz Friedlander
13.	"If Walls Could Talk"	Friedlander
14.	"The First Time Ever I Saw Your Face" (from All the Way... A Decade of Song TV special)
15.	"All the Way" (with Frank Sinatra; All the Way... A Decade of Song TV special)
16.	"Then You Look at Me"	Woodruff
17.	"I Want You to Need Me"	Friedlander
18.	"Live (for the One I Love)"	Woodruff
19.	"It's All Coming Back to Me Now" (stereo mix – long version)	Dick

== Charts ==
=== Weekly charts ===
Weekly chart performance
Chart (2001–2022)	Peak position
Argentine Music DVD (CAPIF)	16
Australian Music DVD (ARIA)	3
Belgian Music DVD (Ultratop Flanders)	6
Dutch Music DVD (MegaCharts)	6
French Music DVD (SNEP)	9
Swedish Music DVD (Sverigetopplistan)	12
UK Music Videos (OCC)	20
US Music Video Sales (Billboard)	15

=== Year-end charts ===
2002 year-end video chart performance
Chart (2002)	Position
Australian Music DVD (ARIA)	39
Swedish Music DVD (Sverigetopplistan)	46

2003 year-end video chart performance
Chart (2003)	Position
Dutch Music DVD (MegaCharts)	30

== Certifications ==
Certifications
Region	Certification	Certified units/sales
Australia (ARIA)	8× Platinum	120,000^{^}
United Kingdom (BPI)	Platinum	50,000^{^}
United States (RIAA)	Platinum	100,000^{^}
^{^} Shipments figures based on certification alone.

== Release history ==
Release history
Region	Date	Label	Format	Catalog
North America	20 February 2001	Epic	VHS	502292
North America	20 February 2001	Epic	DVD	502299
Europe	9 May 2001	Columbia	VHS	502292
Europe	9 May 2001	Columbia	DVD	502299
Australia	7 September 2001	Epic	DVD	502299
Japan	11 October 2001	Epic	DVD	EIBP-1
