= Miles to Go Before I Sleep =

Miles to Go Before I Sleep is a quotation from the poem "Stopping by Woods on a Snowy Evening" by Robert Frost.

Miles to Go Before I Sleep may also refer to:

- Miles to Go Before I Sleep, a 1975 TV movie starring Martin Balsam
- "Miles to Go (Before I Sleep)", a 1998 single by Céline Dion
- Miles Before I Sleep, the 2018 debut album by American Atmospheric Black Metal band Great Cold Emptiness

== See also ==
- Miles to Go, 2009 memoir of Miley Cyrus
- "Miles to Go" (In Plain Sight episode)
