= That's the Way It Is (Celine Dion song) =

1999 single by Céline Dion

Single by Celine Dion

from the album All the Way... A Decade of Song
- B-side: "I Met an Angel (On Christmas Day)"
- Released: 1 November 1999
- Recorded: 1999
- Studio: Paradise Sounds; Cheiron
- Genre: Pop
- Length: 4:01
- Label: Columbia; Epic
- Songwriters: Max Martin; Kristian Lundin; Andreas Carlsson
- Producers: Max Martin; Kristian Lundin

Celine Dion singles chronology
"Treat Her Like a Lady" (1999)	"That's the Way It Is" (1999)	"Live (for the One I Love)" (2000)

Music video
- "That's the Way It Is" on YouTube

"That's the Way It Is" is the lead single from Canadian singer Celine Dion's greatest hits album, All the Way... A Decade of Song, released on 1 November 1999 by Columbia and Epic Records. It reached the top 10 in many countries, including Austria, Belgium, Canada, Finland, France, Germany, Greece, Hungary, Italy, the Netherlands, New Zealand, Sweden, Switzerland, and the United States. The accompanying music video was directed by Liz Friedlander and was nominated for a MuchMusic Video Award. Billboard listed "That's the Way It Is" among the Greatest Songs of 1999.

== Background and release ==
"That's the Way It Is" was written and produced by Swedish songwriters Andreas Carlsson, Max Martin, and Kristian Lundin, who had created a run of hit singles for artists such as NSYNC, Backstreet Boys, and Britney Spears.

Several club remixes were prepared by Metro. Some pressings of the single included "I Met an Angel (On Christmas Day)", a non-album track. The song was later included on The Collector's Series, Volume One (2000) and My Love: Essential Collection (2008).

== Composition ==
"That's the Way It Is" opens in the key of E major with a moderate tempo of 93 beats per minute. The verses follow a chord progression of C♯m–A–B, and Dion's vocals span from B_{3} to E_{5}. After the bridge, the chorus returns in the key of A major.

== Critical reception ==
Stephen Thomas Erlewine of AllMusic wrote that the dance-pop "That's the Way It Is" succeeds and marked it as a standout on All the Way... A Decade of Song. Another editor, Jose F. Promis, reviewed the US CD maxi-single and rated it three out of five stars. He described the song as a "cheerful pop nugget", called the album version a "definitive hit", and referred to the "Metro club remix" as a "bubbly dance" take. Michael Paoletta from Billboard magazine singled it out on the album and described it as a "welcome uptempo number".

Chuck Taylor also praised "That's the Way It Is". He wrote that Dion "ups the tempo with the irresistible" first single. According to Taylor, the track, a joyful ode to keeping faith while allowing love to unfold naturally, pairs Dion with a new team of collaborators, consistent hitmakers Max Martin, Kristian Lundin, and Andreas Carlsson. He noted its mandolin line and midtempo beat, and stated that the song is "destined to enrapture" top forty and AC radio, countering claims that Dion's music was "too adult". He added that the song shows a fresh direction for Martin, known for his work with youth-oriented acts. Taylor concluded that "That's the Way It Is" stands among "the most compelling radio releases yet" from "one of the core voices of the decade".

Can't Stop the Pop wrote that the song "doesn't sound like it's trying to be Britney Spears; it sounds like the authentic evolution of a superstar – this is a Celine Dion song through and through – and it's hard to imagine it being performed by anyone else".

== Commercial performance ==
The song became a major hit, reaching number one on the adult contemporary charts in Canada and the United States, and entering the top 10 in many other countries. It was Dion's first airplay-only single to appear on the Billboard Hot 100, peaking at number six and becoming her 10th and final top 10 hit (number two on the Billboard Hot 100 Airplay). The commercial single was released nine months later as a double A-side with "I Want You to Need Me", reaching number 62 on the Hot 100 Singles Sales.

It placed at number 12 on the decade-end US Billboard Adult Contemporary chart for 2000–2009. The song spent one week at number one and a total of 85 weeks on the chart, making it one of the longest-running singles in its history.

"That's the Way It Is" was certified platinum in Sweden and gold in the United Kingdom, Germany, France, Belgium, Australia, and New Zealand.

According to Billboard, the song received the "BDS Certified Spin Award - 500,000 Spins" in August 2006. Since its release in November 1999, it has accumulated 500,000 spins across almost 1,400 radio stations in Canada and the US.

== Music video ==
The music video for "That's the Way It Is" was directed by Liz Friedlander and produced by Heather Heller. It was filmed in Los Angeles and premiered on VH1 on 8 November 1999. It received a nomination for a MuchMusic Video Award. The video was later included on Dion's All the Way... A Decade of Song & Video DVD. The upload of the music video on YouTube on 25 October 2009 surpassed 400 million views.

== Live performances ==
Dion performed it live with *NSYNC on backing vocals during her 1999 CBS Special. She also sang "That's the Way It Is" on Top of the Pops on 12 November, the 1999 Billboard Music Awards, the Bambi Awards on 11 December, The Rosie O'Donnell Show on 13 December, The Today Show on 31 December, and as the closing number on the Let's Talk About Love Tour.

When Dion returned to the music scene after her two-year break in 2002, the song was included in promotional performances for the A New Day Has Come album, including another appearance on The Today Show, The Early Show, and at the concert for World Children's Day.

In 2015, for the first time in 13 years, Dion added the song as an acoustic version, later returning to the full arrangement in her second Las Vegas residency, Celine, at The Colosseum at Caesars Palace in Las Vegas. She also performed it during her 2017 European tour and 2018 tour. "That's the Way It Is" was part of her BST Hyde Park concert in London on 5 July 2019, and it appears on the setlist of the Courage World Tour in North America.

== Formats and track listing ==
- European and Japanese CD single; UK cassette single
1. "That's the Way It Is" – 4:01
2. "I Met an Angel (On Christmas Day)" – 3:20
- Australian, European, and UK CD single
1. "That's the Way It Is" – 4:01
2. "I Met an Angel (On Christmas Day)" – 3:20
3. "My Heart Will Go On" (live) – 5:23
- UK CD single #2
1. "That's the Way It Is" – 4:01
2. "That's the Way It Is" (the Metro club remix) – 5:28
3. "Another Year Has Gone By" – 3:25
- European 12-inch single
1. "That's the Way It Is" (album version) – 4:01
2. "That's the Way It Is" (Metro mix edit) – 3:12
3. "That's the Way It Is" (Metro edit) – 3:20
4. "That's the Way It Is" (the Metro club remix) – 5:28
- US 12-inch and CD single
1. "That's the Way It Is" (album version) – 4:01
2. "That's the Way It Is" (the Metro club remix) – 5:28
3. "I Want You to Need Me" (Thunderpuss radio mix) – 4:32
4. "I Want You to Need Me" (Thunderpuss club mix) – 8:09

== Charts ==
=== Weekly charts ===
Weekly chart performance
Chart (1999–2000)	Peak position
Australia (ARIA)	14
Austria (Ö3 Austria Top 40)	8
Belgium (Ultratop 50 Flanders)	17
Belgium (Ultratop 50 Wallonia)	7
Canada Top Singles (RPM)	5
Canada Adult Contemporary (RPM)	1
Canada (Canadian Singles Chart)	13
Canada (BDS Contemporary Hit Radio)	4
Czech Republic (Rádio Top 50)	1
Europe (European Hot 100 Singles)	2
Finland (Suomen virallinen lista)	4
France (SNEP)	6
Germany (GfK)	8
Greece (IFPI)	4
Hungary (Single Top 40)	3
Hungary (Rádiós Top 40)	2
Iceland (Íslenski Listinn Topp 40)	12
Ireland (IRMA)	12
Italy (FIMI)	3
Netherlands (Dutch Top 40)	7
Netherlands (Single Top 100)	7
New Zealand (Recorded Music NZ)	7
Norway (VG-lista)	3
Poland Airplay (Music & Media)	4
Quebec Radio Songs (ADISQ)	1
Scottish Singles Sales (Official Charts)	12
Spain (Promusicae)	8
Sweden (Sverigetopplistan)	2
Switzerland (Schweizer Hitparade)	5
UK Singles (Official Charts)	12
UK Airplay (Music Week)	24
US Billboard Hot 100	6
US Adult Contemporary (Billboard)	1
US Adult Pop Airplay (Billboard)	5
US Dance Singles Sales (Billboard)	7
US Pop Airplay (Billboard)	3
US Rhythmic Airplay (Billboard)	40
US Top 40 Tracks (Billboard)	3

=== Year-end charts ===
1999 year-end chart performance
Chart (1999)	Position
Australia (ARIA)	88
Belgium (Ultratop 50 Wallonia)	93
Canada Adult Contemporary (RPM)	41
Europe (European Hot 100 Singles)	75
Netherlands (Dutch Top 40)	95
Norway Autumn Period (VG-lista)	7
Sweden (Hitlistan)	14
UK Singles (OCC)	183

2000 year-end chart performance
Chart (2000)	Position
Brazil (Crowley)	90
Europe (European Hot 100 Singles)	46
Germany (Media Control)	83
Netherlands (Dutch Top 40)	99
Netherlands (Single Top 100)	99
Switzerland (Schweizer Hitparade)	43
US Billboard Hot 100	28
US Adult Contemporary (Billboard)	3
US Adult Top 40 (Billboard)	18
US Mainstream Top 40 (Billboard)	21
US Maxi-Singles Sales (Billboard)	32
US Top 40 Tracks (Billboard)	19

2001 year-end chart performance
Chart (2001)	Position
US Adult Contemporary (Billboard)	23

=== Decade-end charts ===
Decade-end chart performance
Chart (2000–2009)	Position
US Adult Contemporary (Billboard)	12

=== All-time charts ===
All-time chart performance
Chart (1975–2000)	Position
Canada (Nielsen SoundScan)	65

== Certifications ==
Certifications
Region	Certification	Certified units/sales
Australia (ARIA)	Gold	35,000^{^}
Belgium (BRMA)	Gold	25,000^{*}
France (SNEP)	Gold	250,000^{*}
Germany (BVMI)	Gold	250,000^{^}
New Zealand (RMNZ)	Gold	15,000^{‡}
Sweden (GLF)	Platinum	30,000^{^}
United Kingdom (BPI)	Gold	400,000^{‡}
^{*} Sales figures based on certification alone.^{^} Shipments figures based on certification alone.^{‡} Sales+streaming figures based on certification alone.

== Release history ==
Release history
Region	Date	Format	Label	Ref.
United States	18 October 1999	Adult contemporary; hot adult contemporary; contemporary hit radio	Epic	
Japan	3 November 1999	CD	SMEJ	
United Kingdom	29 November 1999	Cassette; CD	Epic	
United States	1 August 2000	CD	Epic	

== See also ==
- Billboard Year-End Hot 100 singles of 2000
- List of Billboard Adult Contemporary number ones of 1999
- List of Billboard Hot 100 top-ten singles in 2000
