= The Collector's Series, Volume One =

Compilation album by Celine Dion
- Released: 23 October 2000
- Recorded: 1989–1999
- Genre: Pop
- Length: 71:30
- Language: English; French; Spanish; Italian; Japanese
- Label: Columbia; Epic
- Producer: Walter Afanasieff; David Foster; Humberto Gatica; Jean-Jacques Goldman; Rick Hahn; Dan Hill; John Jones; Kristian Lundin; George Martin; Max Martin; Christopher Neil; Rick Nowels; Serge Perathoner; Billy Steinberg; Jannick Top; Ric Wake

Celine Dion chronology
All the Way... A Decade of Song (1999)	The Collector's Series, Volume One (2000)	A New Day Has Come (2002)

The Collector's Series, Volume One is a primarily English-language compilation album by Canadian singer Celine Dion, released by Columbia Records and Epic Records on 23 October 2000. The album was issued in France under the title Tout en amour (lit. 'All in Love'). It includes a selection of hits absent from Dion's first English-language greatest hits album, All the Way... A Decade of Song, album tracks, and songs previously unreleased on Dion's albums in certain territories. The album has sold more than three million copies worldwide.

== Content ==
The album includes "The Power of the Dream" from the opening ceremony of the 1996 Summer Olympics and songs in French, Spanish, and Japanese. It also contains singles that were not included on Dion's previous greatest hits album, All the Way... A Decade of Song: "Where Does My Heart Beat Now", "Only One Road", "Falling into You", "Tell Him", and "The Reason".

Tout en amour was also released in France as a limited edition, including 12 colour postcards with previously unreleased photos of Dion. The album was reissued in October 2004 in select European countries as part of the Best of the Best Gold series. The gold-disc pressing was housed in a die-cut slipcase, exposing the gold disc, and included the same tracks as the standard edition.

== Critical reception ==
According to Stephen Thomas Erlewine of AllMusic, The Collector's Series, Volume One filled the gaps left by Dion's hits collection All the Way... A Decade of Song, including duets, French and Spanish recordings, and tracks previously unavailable in the United States. He questioned why the album was not composed solely of rarities, which he felt would have served the release better than what he described as a "mixed bag".

== Commercial performance ==
The Collector's Series, Volume One has sold more than three million copies worldwide. It topped the compilation albums chart in France and reached the top 10 in Canada and Portugal, and reached the top 40 in most other countries where it charted.

In the United States, the album debuted at number 28 on the Billboard 200, selling 36,000 copies in its first week. According to Nielsen SoundScan, it has sold over 914,000 copies in the US.

== Track listing ==
No.	Title	Writer(s)	Producer(s)	Length
1.	"The Power of the Dream"	David Foster; Babyface; Linda Thompson	Foster; Babyface^{[a]}	4:27
2.	"Where Does My Heart Beat Now"	Robert White Johnson; Taylor Rhodes	Christopher Neil	4:33
3.	"Us"	Billy Pace	Humberto Gatica; Pace; Jim Steinman^{[b]}	5:46
4.	"The Reason"	Carole King; Mark Hudson; Greg Wells	George Martin; Giles Martin^{[c]}	5:01
5.	"Seduces Me"	Dan Hill; John Sheard	Rick Hahn; Hill; John Jones	3:46
6.	"With This Tear"	Prince	Walter Afanasieff	4:12
7.	"Falling into You"	Billy Steinberg; Rick Nowels; Marie-Claire D'Ubaldo	Nowels; Steinberg	4:18
8.	"Pour que tu m'aimes encore"	Jean-Jacques Goldman	Goldman; Erick Benzi	4:19
9.	"Un garçon pas comme les autres (Ziggy)"	Luc Plamondon; Michel Berger	Jannick Top; Serge Perathoner	2:56
10.	"Be the Man (On This Night)" (Japanese version)	Foster; Junior Miles; Reiko Yukawa^{[d]}	Foster	4:39
11.	"Tell Him" (with Barbra Streisand)	Thompson; Afanasieff; Foster	Foster; Afanasieff	4:51
12.	"The Prayer" (with Andrea Bocelli)	Carole Bayer Sager; Foster; Alberto Testa^{[e]}; Tony Renis^{[e]}	Foster; Renis^{[a]}; Bayer Sager^{[a]}	4:30
13.	"All by Myself" (Spanish version)	Eric Carmen; Sergei Rachmaninoff; Manny Benito^{[f]}	Foster	5:12
14.	"Amar Haciendo el Amor"	Billy Mann; Denise Rich; Benito	Ric Wake; Gatica^{[g]}	4:11
15.	"Only One Road"	Peter Zizzo	Wake	4:48
16.	"That's the Way It Is"	Max Martin; Kristian Lundin; Andreas Carlsson	Martin; Lundin	4:01
Total length:				71:30

=== Notes ===
- ^{^a} signifies a co-producer
- ^{^b} signifies an additional producer
- ^{^c} signifies an assistant producer
- ^{^d} signifies Japanese lyrics
- ^{^e} signifies Italian translation
- ^{^f} signifies Spanish lyrics
- ^{^g} signifies an additional vocal producer
- The Japanese edition also includes "When I Fall in Love".

== Charts ==
=== Weekly charts ===
Weekly chart performance
Chart (2000–2001)	Peak position
Australian Albums (ARIA)	51
Austrian Albums (Ö3 Austria)	16
Belgian Albums (Ultratop Flanders)	33
Belgian Albums (Ultratop Wallonia)	34
Canadian Albums (Billboard)	4
Dutch Albums (Album Top 100)	15
European Albums (Music & Media)	27
Finnish Albums (Suomen virallinen lista)	39
French Compilations (SNEP)	1
German Albums (Offizielle Top 100)	28
Greek Foreign Albums (IFPI)	5
Hungarian Albums (MAHASZ)	30
Irish Albums (IRMA)	29
Italian Albums (FIMI)	35
Japanese Albums (Oricon)	13
Malaysian Albums (RIM)	4
New Zealand Albums (RMNZ)	27
Portuguese Albums (AFP)	7
Quebec (ADISQ)	4
Scottish Albums (OCC)	32
Swiss Albums (Schweizer Hitparade)	12
UK Albums (OCC)	30
US Billboard 200	28

=== Year-end charts ===
Year-end chart performance
Chart (2000)	Position
Canadian Albums (SoundScan)	86
Finnish Foreign Albums (Suomen virallinen lista)	191
French Compilations (SNEP)	17

== Certifications and sales ==
Certifications
Region	Certification	Certified units/sales
Australia (ARIA)	Gold	35,000^{‡}
Finland	—	10,238
France (SNEP)	Gold	100,000^{*}
Germany (BVMI)	Gold	150,000^{^}
Hungary (MAHASZ)	Gold	
Japan (RIAJ)	Gold	100,000^{^}
Netherlands (NVPI)	Gold	40,000^{^}
New Zealand (RMNZ)	Gold	7,500^{^}
Switzerland (IFPI Switzerland)	Gold	25,000^{^}
United Kingdom (BPI)	Silver	60,000^{*}
United States (RIAA)	Gold	914,000
Summaries
Worldwide	—	3,000,000
^{*} Sales figures based on certification alone.^{^} Shipments figures based on certification alone.^{‡} Sales+streaming figures based on certification alone.

== Release history ==
Release history
Region	Date	Label	Format	Catalog
Australia	23 October 2000	Epic	CD; cassette	5007282
Europe	23 October 2000	Columbia	CD; cassette	5009952
Canada	24 October 2000	Columbia	CD; cassette	85148
United States	24 October 2000	Epic	CD; cassette	85148
Japan	25 October 2000	SMEJ	CD	ESCA-8237
United Kingdom	30 October 2000	Epic	CD; cassette	5009952
