= Be the Man =

Single by Celine Dion

from the album Let's Talk About Love
- B-side: "Be the Man" (Japanese version)
- Released: 13 November 1997
- Recorded: 1997
- Studio: Wallyworld (San Rafael); Record Plant Studios (Los Angeles); The Hit Factory (New York); Chartmaker Studios (Malibu); Paramount Studios (Los Angeles); Masterphonics (Nashville)
- Genre: Pop
- Length: 4:40
- Label: SMEJ
- Songwriters: David Foster; Junior Miles
- Producer: David Foster

Celine Dion singles chronology
"Tell Him" (1997)	"Be the Man" (1997)	"The Reason" (1997)

Audio
- "Be the Man" on YouTube

"Be the Man" (also known as "Be the Man (On This Night)") is a pop song by Canadian singer Celine Dion, recorded for her fifth English-language studio album, Let's Talk About Love (1997). Written by Junior Miles and producer David Foster, it was issued as the album's second single in Japan on 13 November 1997 by Sony Music Entertainment Japan. The song was used as the theme for the Japanese television drama Eve - Santa Claus Dreaming and appeared on its 1997 soundtrack. Dion recorded the track in both English and Japanese.

== Background and release ==
"Be the Man" did not appear on editions of Let's Talk About Love released in the Americas. It was later used as the B-side of "The Reason", issued simultaneously in parts of Europe. The English version was added to Asian editions of Dion's 1999 greatest hits album All the Way... A Decade of Song and the 2008 Japan-only compilation Complete Best. The Japanese version became available worldwide on The Collector's Series, Volume One in 2000.

== Commercial performance ==
The single reached number 24 on the Oricon Singles Chart and was certified platinum for sales of over 100,000 copies.

== Formats and track listing ==
- Japanese 3-inch CD single
1. "Be the Man" – 4:40
2. "Be the Man" (Japanese version) – 4:40
3. "Be the Man" (karaoke version) – 4:40

== Charts ==
Chart performance
Chart (1997)	Peak position
Japan (Oricon Singles Chart)	24

== Certifications ==
Certifications
Region	Certification	Certified units/sales
Japan (RIAJ)	Platinum	100,000^{^}
^{^} Shipments figures based on certification alone.

== Release history ==
Release history
Region	Date	Format	Label	Ref.
Japan	13 November 1997	3-inch CD	SMEJ	
