= Liz Friedlander =

American music video and television director

- Born: December 9, 1970 (age 55); New York, U.S.
- Occupations: Music video director, television director, television producer
- Years active: 1996–present

Liz Friedlander (born December 9, 1970) is an American music video director, television director, and television producer.

Originally from New York City, Friedlander moved to Pennsylvania to attend the Drama Conservatory school at Carnegie Mellon University. She then moved to Los Angeles where she attended the University of California Santa Cruz followed by the UCLA School of Theater, Film and Television, where she graduated as the valedictorian of her class. She also won the Frank S. Glicksman Award for her short film Eleven-Twenty.

From the mid-1990s to 2009, she has amassed a number of music video credits directing videos for Alanis Morissette, U2, Megadeth, Avril Lavigne, John Mayer, Celine Dion, R.E.M., 3 Doors Down, among other artists. In 2006, she directed her first feature film Take the Lead starring Antonio Banderas. Beginning in 2008, Friedlander moved on to television, directing episodes of One Tree Hill, The Vampire Diaries, Privileged, Pretty Little Liars, 90210, Melrose Place, Outlaw and Gossip Girl.

== Filmography ==
Film

- Take the Lead (2006)

Television (Partial list)

- Privileged
- One Tree Hill
- Melrose Place
- 90210
- The Vampire Diaries
- Pretty Little Liars
- Outlaw
- The Secret Circle
- The Following
- Stalker
- Conviction
- The Gifted
- Wisdom of the Crowd
- Jessica Jones
- The Rookie
- Tell Me a Story
- American Horror Story
- The Boys
- The Equalizer
- American Horror Stories
- The Lincoln Lawyer
- The Waterfront
- The Terminal List: Dark Wolf
- Fallout

=== Music video ===
1996

- Leah Andreone - "It's Alright, It's OK"
- Babyface featuring Mariah Carey & Kenny G - "Every Time I Close My Eyes"
- Maxwell - "Ascension (Don't Ever Wonder)"
- Alanis Morissette - "You Learn"

1997

- Alana Davis - "32 Flavors"
- Chantal Kreviazuk - "Surrounded" (Version #2)
- Billy Lawrence featuring MC Lyte - "Come On"
- Megadeth - "Trust"
- Porno for Pyros - "Hard Charger" (credited as Alan Smithee)

1998

- G. Love & Special Sauce - "I-76"
- Harvey Danger - "Flagpole Sitta"
- Steve Poltz - "Silver Lining"
- Save Ferris - "The World Is New"

1999

- Paula Cole - "I Believe in Love"
- Celine Dion - "That's the Way It Is"
- Shawn Mullins - "What Is Life?"
- R.E.M. - "The Great Beyond"
- Janice Robinson - "Nothing I Would Change"
- Seal - "Lost My Faith"
- Duncan Sheik - "That Says It All"
- Taxiride - "Get Set" (Version #1)

2000

- blink-182 - "Adam's Song"
- Tracy Bonham - "Behind Every Good Woman"
- Deftones - "Change (In the House of Flies)"
- Dido - "Here with Me" (Version #2)
- Celine Dion - "I Want You to Need Me" (Version #2)
- Celine Dion - "If Walls Could Talk"
- k.d. lang - "Summerfling"
- Nine Days - "Absolutely (Story of a Girl)"
- 3 Doors Down - "Loser"

2001

- Anastacia - "Paid My Dues"
- Blaque - "Can't Get It Back"
- Michelle Branch - "Everywhere"
- Natalie Merchant - "Just Can't Last"
- Semisonic - "Chemistry"
- Tantric - "Mourning"
- 3 Doors Down - "Be Like That"
- U2 - "Walk On" (US version)
- The Wallflowers - "Letters From the Wasteland"

2002

- Michelle Branch - "All You Wanted"
- Faithless featuring Dido - "One Step Too Far"
- Jennifer Love Hewitt - "BareNaked"
- Jennifer Love Hewitt - "Can I Go Now"
- Meshell Ndegeocello - "Pocketbook"

2003

- Kelly Clarkson - "Miss Independent"
- Counting Crows featuring Vanessa Carlton - "Big Yellow Taxi"
- Avril Lavigne - "Losing Grip"
- LeAnn Rimes - "We Can"
- Simple Plan - "Perfect"

2004

- The Calling - "Our Lives"
- Alanis Morissette - "Eight Easy Steps"
- Avril Lavigne - "Don't Tell Me"
- Toby Lightman - "Devils and Angels"
- Ashlee Simpson - "Shadow"

2005

- Joss Stone - "Right to Be Wrong"

2006

- John Mayer - "Waiting on the World to Change" (Version #1)
- +44 - "When Your Heart Stops Beating"

2007

- Colbie Caillat - "Bubbly"
- Che'Nelle - "I Fell in Love with the DJ"

2008

- Jessica Simpson - "Come On Over"

2009

- Michelle Branch - "Sooner or Later"
