= Tell Him (Barbra Streisand and Celine Dion song) =

1997 single by Barbra Streisand and Celine Dion

Single by Barbra Streisand and Celine Dion

from the album Higher Ground and Let's Talk About Love
- B-side: "Everything Must Change"; "Where Is the Love"
- Released: November 3, 1997
- Recorded: September 30, 1997
- Studio: Wallyworld; Record Plant; Hit Factory; Chartmarker; Paramount; Masterphonics
- Genre: Pop
- Length: 4:51 (album version); 4:52 (radio edit)
- Label: Columbia; Epic
- Songwriters: Linda Thompson; Walter Afanasieff; David Foster
- Producers: Foster; Afanasieff

Barbra Streisand singles chronology
"I Finally Found Someone" (1996)	"Tell Him" (1997)	"I've Dreamed of You" (1999)

Celine Dion singles chronology
"J'attendais" (1997)	"Tell Him" (1997)	"Be the Man" (1997)

Music video
- "Tell Him" on YouTube

"Tell Him" is a song by American singer Barbra Streisand and Canadian singer Celine Dion, from their respective 1997 studio albums, Higher Ground and Let's Talk About Love. It was written by its producers, David Foster and Walter Afanasieff, and Linda Thompson. The song's origins trace back to the 69th Academy Awards in March 1997, when Dion was asked at the last minute to perform Streisand's nominated song "I Finally Found Someone" at the ceremony. Streisand, who had attended the ceremony but missed Dion's performance, later invited her to work on a song together. Foster subsequently suggested "Tell Him" for the collaboration, which Thompson had conceived as a duet about female friendship rather than romantic rivalry, out of respect for both artists. It was released as the lead single from both singers' albums on November 3, 1997, through Columbia Records and Epic Records.

Musically, "Tell Him" is a theatrical pop ballad in which a younger woman (Dion) consults an experienced mentor (Streisand) about confessing her feelings for a love interest, with the singers trading verses and harmonizing over orchestral instrumentation. Upon release, music critics praised their vocal performances and chemistry, although some found the track overproduced. "Tell Him" was nominated for the Grammy Award for Best Pop Collaboration with Vocals at the 40th Annual Grammy Awards.

Commercially, the song underperformed in the United States, where its chart success was largely limited to adult contemporary radio. However, it became a major international hit, reaching the top 10 across Europe and Australia. Later, "Tell Him" was included on both singers' greatest hits albums: Streisand's The Essential (2002), Duets (2002), and The Ultimate Collection (2010), and Dion's The Collector's Series, Volume One (2000), My Love: Essential Collection (2008), and The Best of Celine Dion & David Foster (2012).

== Background ==
Barbra Streisand declined an invitation to perform "I Finally Found Someone", the Oscar-nominated song she had written for her film The Mirror Has Two Faces (1996) and recorded as a duet with Bryan Adams, at the 69th Academy Awards, which aired on March 24, 1997. Natalie Cole was scheduled to perform in her place. When Cole withdrew shortly before the ceremony due to illness, Dion, who had already been slated to sing "Because You Loved Me" from Up Close & Personal, was asked to perform the song instead. (Note: Some sources report that, after Cole withdrew, Streisand offered to perform on the condition that she be given additional rehearsal time. However, the Academy producers ultimately chose Dion, who had already rehearsed and was considered less demanding.) Although nervous about having to learn an additional song within 24 hours, she accepted. The performance made Dion the first artist to perform twice during the same Academy Awards ceremony.

The media noticed that Streisand was absent from her seat during Dion's performance, prompting speculation that she had been unhappy with the performance or intentionally snubbed her. Streisand clarified that she had gone to the restroom during a commercial break, unaware that Dion was about to take the stage. By the time she attempted to return to the auditorium, its doors had been locked, preventing her from witnessing the live performance. She expressed regret at having missed it and said she had apologized to Dion in person shortly afterwards. Eventually, Streisand watched a recording of the telecast to see Dion's cover. A few days later, she sent Dion a bouquet with a note praising her rendition, and suggested they collaborate on a song.

== Writing and recording ==
Although Dion had long cited Streisand as one of her greatest idols and musical influences, she expressed reservations about working with her, fearing it might tarnish her image of someone she deeply admired. Additionally, the media had long described Dion as something of a musical successor to Streisand. Dion's husband and manager, René Angélil, contacted Streisand's agent, Martin Erlichman, and producer David Foster about arranging a song between the two singers. While awaiting confirmation from Streisand's team, Foster proposed a song he had written titled "Tell Him", which he described as being about an older woman offering romantic advice to a younger one. Foster wrote the song with Linda Thompson, to whom he was married at the time, and Walter Afanasieff, who also produced the track. When developing the lyrics, Thompson wanted to avoid portraying the two singers, whom she greatly respected, as rivals in a typical "You stole my man"-type song. Instead, she envisioned Streisand as an experienced mentor whom Dion approaches for romantic advice, believing that she knew both singers well enough to recognize their preference for a song about female friendship rather than competition.

Due to scheduling conflicts, Streisand and Dion recorded their respective vocals separately, with Streisand recording at the Record Plant in Los Angeles and Dion adding her vocals a few days later at The Hit Factory in New York. (Note: The date shown in the "Tell Him" segment of the Let's Talk About Love making-of featurette suggests that Dion and Streisand recorded the song together on September 30, 1997. However, contemporary accounts confirm that the singers recorded their vocals separately, at studios in different cities.) Afanasieff believes that the singers' instincts and chemistry, despite not having worked in the same room together, are a testament to their musicianship, describing them as among the greatest female vocalists of their time. Once the final mix was completed, the two listened to the finished track for the first time simultaneously, from opposite coasts. Streisand subsequently called Dion's studio to tell her that she liked her contribution. The singers have consistently praised each other's vocal performances on the duet, both at the time of its recording and in subsequent years.

== Release ==
"Tell Him" was serviced to radio stations in the United States on October 7, 1997, via satellite broadcast. Columbia Records released "Tell Him" as a CD maxi single and CD single in Europe on October 31, 1997. The maxi single featured Streisand's "Everything Must Change" and Dion's "Where Is the Love" as additional tracks, while the CD single included radio and album versions of "Tell Him". The single's artwork is credited to Renata Buser, Streisand's longtime assistant. The song was released as the lead single from both singers' 1997 studio albums, Higher Ground and Let's Talk About Love, respectively. Streisand wrote a dedication to Dion for the liner notes of Higher Ground, recalling that Foster had introduced her to Dion's music years before they met and praising her artistry. On Dion's album, it is one of two high-profile duets, the other being "I Hate You Then I Love You" with tenor Luciano Pavarotti. The radio version of the song appears only on the single's releases as the opening track. It runs the same length as the album version and features an electric guitar riff at the start of Dion's bridge.

News of the duet was widely regarded as a media event. Much of the commentary surrounding the single focused on the commercial expectations generated by the singers' combined star power, with Richard Harrington of The Washington Post describing it as an "event" recording whose main objective was to sell records. He contrasted it with earlier "cause recordings", such as USA for Africa's "We Are the World" (1985) and Elton John's "Candle in the Wind 1997", which carried greater social and political weight.

The single was scheduled for a United States retail release on November 4, 1997, but the plan was canceled despite copies already having been manufactured. Theda Sandiford-Waller of Billboard attributed the decision to the track's weak performance at top 40 radio, although the record label never issued an official statement explaining the cancellation.

== Composition ==
“Tell Him” is a theatrical, emotionally charged pop power ballad, which Tom Gliatto of People described as melodic yet histrionic. According to the official sheet music published by Warner Chappell Music, Inc., the song is written in G-sharp minor and performed 4/4 time, at a slow tempo of 76 beats per minute. Critics have noted Broadway influences in its musical arrangement, concept, and production, the latter of which Matthew Greenwald of AllMusic found to be rooted in the overproduced style of 1980s music. Its instrumentation contains orchestral flourishes, including strings. A Newsweek writer described it as "a plaintive paean to romantic love" with a broadly appealing, middle of the road sound.

In the duet, Dion portrays a younger woman seeking romantic advice from an older, more experienced woman, portrayed by Streisand. The singers explore the universal experience of having feelings for someone but being afraid to confess them, with Streisand reassuring Dion that she should not be afraid to profess her love. Critics have variously likened Streisand and Dion's dynamic on the song to that of a mother and daughter, sisters, or girlfriends. Dion opens the song, her voice trembling with innocence as she sings about her romantic dilemma, before Streisand joins her as "a doyenne of love". Streisand, meanwhile, sings her opening line softly, conveying warmth, reassurance, and authority, before crescendoing into the following line. Streisand sustains the final note of her first verse, which segues into the refrain, where the singers first exchange lines. Alternating between trading verses and singing together, they harmonize throughout, with Streisand's soft yet prominent vocal delivery contrasting with Dion's powerful vocals. Vocally, their performances remain relatively restrained and understated until the final chorus, spanning an octave and a perfect fifth, from A3 to F5. However, Melissa Ruggieri of USA Today characterized the song as a "vocal duel", and Michael Cragg of The Guardian described it as a "vocal blitzkrieg".

Dion's opening line reads "I’m scared / So afraid to show I care". Lyrics such as Dion’s “Will he think I’m weak / If I tremble when I speak?” convey her longing and passion for a man, held back by her own insecurities, while Streisand’s “Touch him with the gentleness you feel inside / Your love can’t be denied” suggests wisdom and experience. As the ballad progresses, their vocals intertwine, conveying a sense of relief and solidarity as the singers' spirits seem to lift. The mantra "Love will be the gift you give yourself" is featured, with Jonathan Chua of The Philippine Star likening Streisand's delivery, particularly her use of rubato, to a eureka moment. Anne T. Donahue of CBC Arts humorously cautioned listeners against applying the romantic advice offered in the song to real-life relationships.

== Critical reception ==
Upon release, "Tell Him" received a range of both positive and negative reviews from music critics. The New York Observer's Jonathan Bernstein recognized "Tell Him" as "the centerpiece" of Let's Talk About Love, writing that the duet partners "give each other room to emote ... before transforming into something akin to a pair of drunks wrestling over the microphone on karaoke night". Morag Reavley of BBC Music described it as an "epic" chart hit. AllMusic's senior editor Stephen Thomas Erlewine identified it as one of the tracks that "shine the most brilliantly" on Let's Talk About Love, and questioned its omission from Dion's first English-language greatest hits album, All the Way... A Decade of Song (1999). However, in reviewing Higher Ground, he called it "an overblown duet" that only vaguely touches on the album's themes. (Note: Streisand and the media described Higher Ground as an album with religious themes.) For The Baltimore Sun, J. D. Considine considered it a disappointing track on Streisand's album. Jonathan Chua of The Philippine Star criticized its lyrics as some of "the worst in popular music", but praised Streisand for enlivening the otherwise unremarkable song.

A common topic of praise was Streisand and Dion's performances, particularly their vocal chemistry, with Larry Flick of Billboard writing that few "will be able to resist the electricity resulting from the blend of their voices". Flick also considered Foster and Afanasieff the only musicians capable of helming the song, and expected "Tell Him" to become a major hit. Music Week gave the song three out of five stars, noting that "Streisand and Dion's vocals blend effortlessly ... showcasing the pair's remarkable ranges". Conversely, Entertainment Weekly editor David Browne dismissed the song as "an Uberschlock ode to subservience", arguing that only Streisand sounded convincing on the duet, at Dion's expense. Similarly, Michael Roberts of Westword found Dion's performance "flavorless" compared to Streisand's, writing that the younger singer was "left to flit around her partner’s like a piglet unable to muscle her siblings away from mom’s nipples at feeding time". In the Los Angeles Times, Elysa Gardner wrote that although Dion's vocal quality sometimes rivalled that of her duet partner, "the elder singer leaves her in the dust" when it came to emoting. Harriet Walker of The Independent criticized the competitive dynamic encouraged by collaborations between female singers, describing "Tell Him" as "wretched" and writing that its performers were "desperately trying to out-wail each other on a power ballad".

Elsewhere, some critics felt that the singers' vocals were undermined by the production. Richard Harrington of The Washington Post found "Tell Him" most effective when its production was subtle enough to let the vocals shine, although he admitted that "the inevitable excess is almost bearable". However, he deemed many of the other Let's Talk About Love tracks "lesser" by comparison. AllMusic's Matthew Greenwald praised how well the singers' voices blended, which he felt had helped the ballad age well, but criticized its otherwise pretty melody for being overwhelmed by a bombastic arrangement and overproduction. Meanwhile, Amazon music critic Rickey Wright called it a "car wreck" in comparison with Streisand's duets from the 1970s.

=== Accolades ===
At the 40th Annual Grammy Awards in 1998, the song was nominated for Best Pop Collaboration with Vocals. Streisand also received a nomination in the same category that year for "I Finally Found Someone".

"Tell Him" has appeared on rankings of both artists' songs by various publications, including CBC Music, which ranked it as Dion's 14th-greatest song in 2024. Both The Daily Telegraph and The Guardian ranked it eighth, with the latter calling the singers' vocal chemistry undeniable, despite the song's dated production. Smooth Radio ranked it at number 10. Grammy.com named it one of 15 songs that best showcase the singer’s “Unforgettably Powerful Voice”. Anne T. Donahue of CBC Arts ranked it as her sixth-most definitive song, calling it "the only adult contemporary duet that truly matters". Conversely, Vogue Adria considered "Tell Him" one of Dion's lesser-known songs that deserved greater recognition. For Streisand, Woman's World ranked it as her fourth-best song, and American Songwriter ranked it sixth. Cliff Lee of The Globe and Mail credited the song with contributing to Streisand's longevity, writing that the duet "helped usher in a second era of Babs and her famous friends".

The song has also been described by publications as one of music’s greatest collaborations and duets; Spotlight noted that “there’s a reason this song features on every greatest hits release both artists have ever put out”. In 2011, Billboard included it among the top 10 all-female hit collaborations in the magazine's chart history. PA Media cited it among "The most powerful pop diva collaborations ever", while AARP included it among the greatest intergenerational duets. The same outlet named it one of Streisand's 10 best duets. Chérie FM declared it one of Dion's "most beautiful" duets, while La Presse listed it among her most iconic. Meanwhile, YourTango ranked "Tell Him" as Foster's fifth-greatest song.

== Commercial performance ==
During its first week of radio airplay, "Tell Him" received 13 million audience impressions across 81 monitored stations, most of which were adult contemporary stations. In the United States, the song was a significant hit on adult contemporary radio, reaching number five on Billboard's Adult Contemporary chart. Despite high expectations, however, it did not become a major hit elsewhere in the United States, failing to chart on the Billboard Hot 100 altogether, and peaking at number 58 on Billboard's Hot 100 Airplay chart. Nonetheless, Adam Sandler of Variety believes the song received radio airplay it probably would not have as a solo release, and writers credit its popularity with helping Higher Ground debut at number one in the United States.

"Tell Him" performed strongly outside of the United States. Although airplay in the UK was similarly limited, it still became the 33rd best-selling single of 1997 there. The song reached the top 10 in over 15 countries, including the UK (number three), Ireland (number two), Italy (number four), and Australia (number nine). In France, "Tell Him" spent 18 weeks on the singles chart, entering at number 10 on November 8, 1997, and peaking at number four for five weeks. It exited the chart on March 14, 1998, at number 82. It also peaked at number three on the European Hot 100 Singles chart and appeared on several year-end charts in 1997 and 1998. The single earned platinum certifications in the Netherlands, Belgium, and Australia, and gold certifications in the United Kingdom, Canada, France, Switzerland, and Norway.

"Tell Him" is Dion's fourth best-selling song in the United Kingdom, behind "Because You Loved Me", and her 15th most-streamed song in the region. "Tell Him" was included among the United Kingdom's 50 best-selling duets of all time in 2011, according to a chart compiled by the Official Charts Company for BBC Radio 2. In addition to "Tell Him", much of Streisand's success on the Official Singles Chart has come from duets, including "You Don't Bring Me Flowers" (1978; number five), "No More Tears (Enough Is Enough)" (1979; number three) and "I Finally Found Someone" (1997; number 10). As of 2026, "Tell Him" ranks as Streisand's sixth-most-streamed song on Spotify.

== Music video and live performances ==
The music video for the song was directed by American producer and director Scott Lochmus and premiered on VH1 on October 24, 1997. It was later included as a bonus on the Au cœur du stade DVD.

In the video, Streisand and Dion begin with a brief exchange about how to divide the song's vocal parts. Streisand suggests, "We could try, try it both ways and see which feels better", before Dion asks which line she should sing first and performs the song's opening line. A montage follows, showing the two singers performing, with Foster also appearing. Streisand appears to correct Dion's diction at several points throughout the video, which Nathan Smith of Vulture interpreted as evidence that she maintains the motherly "upper hand". Helen Brown of The Daily Telegraph described the video as "an equally sisterly confection", in which the two divas relish each other's parts, gesture with their manicured hands, and ultimately unite with "cool assurance". The New York Observer's Jonathan Bernstein likened Dion's demeanor to that of "a newly born fawn nuzzling up against its mother", concluding that "this is no diva face-off". However, Harriet Walker of The Independent called the video "painful" to watch.

Streisand and Dion were scheduled to perform the duet at the 40th Annual Grammy Awards in 1998, where the song had been nominated for Best Pop Collaboration with Vocals; this would have marked its first live performance. The performance was canceled after Streisand contracted the flu. Her illness prevented her from attending rehearsals with Dion, although Streisand later stated that she had initially intended to perform regardless. Her spokesperson expressed Streisand's disappointment at having to miss the performance. With "Tell Him" canceled, Grammy producers and Dion's team sought a replacement performance that could match the duet's prominence, ultimately opting for "My Heart Will Go On" from Titanic (1997). On the morning of the ceremony, Streisand reportedly felt well enough to perform, and Dion agreed to switch back to "Tell Him". However, Streisand withdrew once again after learning that her glam team, believing the performance had been canceled, had already left the venue. To date, the singers have not performed the duet live together.

Dion performed "Tell Him" solo throughout the Let's Talk About Love World Tour (1998-1999), including at the inaugural concert of Denver's Pepsi Center on October 1, 1999. In most performances, Dion virtually duetted with prerecorded footage of Streisand taken from the album's "making-of" featurette. A Variety review of Dion's October 21, 1998 concert at the Great Western Forum reported that sightings of Ehrlichman sparked speculation among the audience that Streisand might make a surprise appearance, although those hopes ultimately proved unfounded.

== Covers ==
Since 2017, "Tell Him" has been featured in the jukebox musical Titanique, in which the characters of Dion and Molly Brown encourage Rose to confess her true feelings to Jack. In 2018, singer Ariana Grande shared a throwback video of herself as a young girl singing "Tell Him" with her mother, Joan, in a car. In 2019, Pia Toscano and Loren Allred covered "Tell Him" at Foster's concert An Intimate Evening with David Foster, with Toscano opening the song and Allred joining her. The performance aired on PBS in November 2019 and was also included on the accompanying album, An Intimate Evening. American Idol contestants Funke Lagoke and Ronda Felton performed the song during a duets-themed challenge in March 2021. The performance was poorly received by the judges, and Lagoke fainted onstage while judge Lionel Richie was delivering his comments. She was taken to hospital, where she was treated for dehydration before being released.

== Formats and track listing ==
- European CD single
1. "Tell Him" (radio edit) – 4:52
2. "Tell Him" (album version) – 4:51
- European and Japanese CD single; Australian and UK cassette and CD single
1. "Tell Him" (radio edit) – 4:52
2. "Everything Must Change" – 4:03
3. "Where Is the Love" – 4:59
- European 12-inch single
1. "Tell Him" (radio edit) – 4:52
2. "Everything Must Change" – 4:03
3. "Tell Him" (album version) – 4:51
4. "Where Is the Love" – 4:59

== Charts ==
=== Weekly charts ===
Weekly chart performance
Chart (1997–1998)	Peak position
Australia (ARIA)	9
Austria (Ö3 Austria Top 40)	23
Belgium (Ultratop 50 Flanders)	3
Belgium (Ultratop 50 Wallonia)	3
Canada (SoundScan)	12
Canada Top Singles (RPM)	47
Canada Adult Contemporary (RPM)	1
European Hot 100 Singles (Music & Media)	3
European Hit Radio (Music & Media)	24
Finland (Suomen virallinen radiosoittolista)	4
France (SNEP)	4
Germany (GfK)	25
Greece (IFPI)	6
Iceland (Íslenski Listinn Topp 40)	26
Ireland (IRMA)	2
Italy (FIMI)	4
Netherlands (Dutch Top 40)	1
Netherlands (Single Top 100)	2
Norway (VG-lista)	8
Poland (ZPAV Airplay)	10
Quebec Radio Songs (ADISQ)	1
Romania (Romanian Top 100)	1
Scottish Singles Sales (Official Charts)	3
Spain (AFYVE)	4
Sweden (Sverigetopplistan)	27
Switzerland (Schweizer Hitparade)	4
Taiwan (IFPI)	5
UK Singles (Official Charts)	3
UK Airplay (Music Control)	55
US Radio Songs (Billboard)	58
US Adult Contemporary (Billboard)	5

=== Year-end charts ===
1997 year-end chart performance
Chart (1997)	Position
Australia (ARIA)	46
Belgium (Ultratop 50 Flanders)	30
Belgium (Ultratop 50 Wallonia)	15
Canada Adult Contemporary (RPM)	24
Europe (European Hot 100 Singles)	57
France (SNEP)	33
Netherlands (Dutch Top 40)	48
Netherlands (Single Top 100)	24
Norway Christmas Period (VG-lista)	13
Romania (Romanian Top 100)	36
UK Singles (OCC)	33

1998 year-end chart performance
Chart (1998)	Position
Belgium (Ultratop 50 Flanders)	80
Belgium (Ultratop 50 Wallonia)	89
Canada Adult Contemporary (RPM)	71
Europe (European Hot 100 Singles)	46
Netherlands (Dutch Top 40)	57
Netherlands (Single Top 100)	16
Switzerland (Schweizer Hitparade)	32
US Adult Contemporary (Billboard)	35

=== Decade-end charts ===
Chart (1990–1999)	Rank
Netherlands (Dutch Top 40)	73

== Certifications and sales ==
Certifications
Region	Certification	Certified units/sales
Australia (ARIA)	Platinum	70,000^{‡}
Belgium (BRMA)	Platinum	50,000^{*}
Canada (Music Canada)	Gold	40,000^{‡}
France (SNEP)	Gold	250,000^{*}
Netherlands (NVPI)	Platinum	75,000^{^}
Norway (IFPI Norway)	Gold	
Switzerland (IFPI Switzerland)	Gold	25,000^{^}
United Kingdom (BPI)	Gold	436,000
^{*} Sales figures based on certification alone.^{^} Shipments figures based on certification alone.^{‡} Sales+streaming figures based on certification alone.

== Release history ==
Release history
Region	Date	Format	Label	Ref.
United States	October 7, 1997	Radio airplay	Columbia; Epic	
Belgium	November 3, 1997	CD	Columbia	
United Kingdom	November 3, 1997	Cassette; CD	Columbia; Epic	
Japan	December 1, 1997	CD	SMEJ	

== See also ==
- 1997 in British music
- French Top 100 singles of the 1990s
- List of Dutch Top 40 number-one singles of 1997
- List of UK top-ten singles in 1997
