= I Want You to Need Me =

Single by Celine Dion

from the album All the Way... A Decade of Song
- B-side: "I Want You to Need Me" (Thunderpuss radio mix)
- Released: 5 April 2000
- Studio: Paradise (Santa Monica); Record Plant (Los Angeles); Hit Factory (New York)
- Genre: Pop
- Length: 4:34
- Label: Columbia; Epic
- Songwriter: Diane Warren
- Producer: Matt Serletic

Celine Dion singles chronology
"The First Time Ever I Saw Your Face" (2000)	"I Want You to Need Me" (2000)	"Sous le vent" (2001)

Music video
- "I Want You to Need Me" on YouTube

"I Want You to Need Me" is a song recorded by Canadian singer Celine Dion for her 1999 greatest hits album, All the Way... A Decade of Song. It was written by Diane Warren and produced by Matt Serletic. "I Want You to Need Me" was released as the second single in North America and Japan in April 2000, and as the third single in selected European countries in July 2000. Several club remixes were created by Thunderpuss. The song received positive reviews from music critics and topped the Canadian Singles Chart. The music video was directed by Liz Friedlander.

== Background and release ==
On 5 April 2000, "I Want You to Need Me" was issued as the second single from All the Way... A Decade of Song in Japan. On 19 July 2000, another Japanese single was released, this time including remixes by Thunderpuss. In the United States, the song was sent to AC/Hot AC radio on 17 April 2000 and to CHR/Pop radio on 25 April 2000. The physical single was released in the US as a double A-side with "That's the Way It Is" on 1 August 2000. "I Want You to Need Me" was also sent to radio in several European countries in June 2000, followed by a physical release there in July 2000.

== Critical reception ==
Chuck Taylor reviewed "I Want You to Need Me" and wrote that pairing Dion with Diane Warren had always been "as fine a fit as a trusty pair of Thom McAn's." He described Warren's "heart-drenched" lyrics and dramatic melody writing, and Dion's "potent vocals straight from soulside," adding that "divadom has never sounded so mighty." According to him, for fans of Dion's "high-caliber" power ballads, the song ranks among her strongest and stands out on All the Way... A Decade of Song. Taylor noted that Warren's melody feels natural and fluid, while production from the usually rock-oriented Matt Serletic is "sheer perfection." He wrote that the track builds from its midsection to an ending where Dion delivers "a crescendo as 'spine-tingling' as those first few times we heard 'My Heart Will Go On.'"

Michael Paoletta of Billboard called the song "a consummate love song ripe for a second single". Stephen Thomas Erlewine of AllMusic wrote that "this song isn't bad, it just isn't that particularly memorable, especially compared to the hits." Jose F. Promis reviewed the US CD maxi single and gave it three out of five stars. He described the mixes as "impassioned, high-NRG Thunderpuss remixes (...) which became something of an underground club hit." He added that the original version is "a big bombastic ballad" well suited to dance reinterpretation, although the remixes "can be a bit loud and a bit strident for those not into this sort of thing."

== Commercial performance ==
"I Want You to Need Me" entered the Canadian Adult Contemporary chart in April 2000 and peaked at number 19. In late June 2000, it debuted at number one on the Canadian Singles Chart. The song also entered the US Adult Contemporary chart in April 2000, peaking at number 12. After its physical release, it debuted on the US Maxi-Singles Sales and Hot 100 Singles Sales charts in August 2000, reaching numbers 7 and 62, respectively. "I Want You to Need Me" also reached the top 40 in Sweden and Switzerland.

== Music video ==
The original music video was directed by Paul Hunter in February 2000, but it was never released. It told a story about a girl, played by Angela Sarafyan, who had a troubled boyfriend and was rebelling against her mother. The second music video was directed by Liz Friedlander and released on 1 May 2000. It was later included on Dion's All the Way... A Decade of Song & Video DVD.

== Formats and track listing ==
- European CD single
1. "I Want You to Need Me" – 4:34
2. "I Want You to Need Me" (Thunderpuss radio mix) – 4:32
- European CD maxi-single
1. "I Want You to Need Me" – 4:34
2. "I Want You to Need Me" (Thunderpuss radio mix) – 4:32
3. "I Want You to Need Me" (Thunderpuss tribapella) – 7:41
4. "That's the Way It Is" (the Metro club remix) – 5:28
- European 12-inch single
1. "I Want You to Need Me" (Thunderpuss club mix) – 8:09
2. "I Want You to Need Me" (Thunderpuss tribapella) – 7:41
3. "I Want You to Need Me" (Thunderdub) – 6:45
4. "I Want You to Need Me" (Thunderpuss club instrumental) – 8:10
- Japanese CD single
1. "I Want You to Need Me" – 4:34
2. "Then You Look at Me" – 4:09
3. "My Heart Will Go On" (live) – 5:23
- Japanese CD maxi-single
1. "I Want You to Need Me" (Thunderpuss radio mix) – 4:32
2. "I Want You to Need Me" (Thunderpuss club mix) – 8:10
3. "I Want You to Need Me" (Thunderpuss tribapella) – 7:42
4. "I Want You to Need Me" (thunderdub) – 6:43
5. "That's the Way It Is" (Metro mix - edit) – 3:15
6. "That's the Way It Is" (the Metro club remix) – 5:30
- US 12-inch and CD single
1. "That's the Way It Is" (album version) – 4:01
2. "That's the Way It Is" (the Metro club remix) – 5:28
3. "I Want You to Need Me" (Thunderpuss radio mix) – 4:32
4. "I Want You to Need Me" (Thunderpuss club mix) – 8:09

== Charts ==
=== Weekly charts ===
Weekly chart performance
Chart (2000)	Peak position
Belgium (Ultratop 50 Flanders)	75
Belgium (Ultratop 50 Wallonia)	73
Canada (Canadian Singles Chart)	1
Canada Adult Contemporary (RPM)	19
Netherlands (Single Top 100)	49
Norway (VG-lista Airplay)	85
Poland Airplay (Music & Media)	7
Quebec Radio Songs (ADISQ)	11
Sweden (Sverigetopplistan)	25
Switzerland (Schweizer Hitparade)	40
US Adult Contemporary (Billboard)	12
US Dance Singles Sales (Billboard) with "That's the Way It Is"	7
US Hot 100 Singles Sales (Billboard) with "That's the Way It Is"	62

=== Year-end charts ===
Year-end chart performance
Chart (2000)	Position
US Adult Contemporary (Billboard)	29
US Maxi-Singles Sales (Billboard)	32

== Release history ==
Release history
Region	Date	Format	Label	Ref.
Japan	5 April 2000	CD	SMEJ	
United States	17 April 2000	Adult contemporary; hot adult contemporary radio	Epic	
United States	25 April 2000	Contemporary hit radio	Epic	
Japan	19 July 2000	CD (remixes)	SMEJ	
United States	1 August 2000	12-inch vinyl; CD	Epic	
