= All the Way... A Decade of Song (TV program) =

- Starring: Celine Dion; Gloria Estefan; NSYNC
- Country of origin: United States
- No. of episodes: 1

Production
- Running time: 44 mins (w/o commercial breaks)

Original release
- Network: CBS
- Release: November 24, 1999

All the Way... A Decade of Song is the second American television special by Canadian singer Celine Dion that was broadcast by CBS on 24 November 1999. It promoted her first English-language greatest hits album of the same name, All the Way... A Decade of Song. The program was filmed on 7 October 1999 during the reopening of Radio City Music Hall in New York City. It shows Dion (backed by her touring band) performing several of her best-known songs and new material. She was joined by guests Grammy-winning Latin singer Gloria Estefan and pop boyband NSYNC, who had previously recorded their Oscar-nominated duet "Music of My Heart". The special ranked as the second-most-watched program in its time slot, with an 8.3 rating and a 14 share. It also marked Dion's final concert special for CBS before she began a two-year break from the music industry.

== Set list ==
1. "Love Can Move Mountains"
2. "To Love You More" (with violinist Taro Hakase)
3. "That's the Way It Is" (with NSYNC)
4. "All the Way" (virtual duet with Frank Sinatra)
5. "The First Time Ever I Saw Your Face"
6. "Music of My Heart" (performed by Gloria Estefan and NSYNC)
7. Medley: "Here We Are" / "Because You Loved Me" / "Conga" (with Gloria Estefan)
8. "That's the Way It Is" (reprise) (with Gloria Estefan and NSYNC)
