= Immortality (Celine Dion song) =

1998 single by Celine Dion

Single by Celine Dion featuring the Bee Gees

from the album Let's Talk About Love
- B-side: "To Love You More"
- Released: 5 June 1998
- Recorded: June 1997 (Dion); 18 August 1997 (Bee Gees)
- Studio: Record Plant; Hit Factory; Middle Ears; Masterphonics
- Genre: Pop
- Length: 4:11
- Label: Columbia; Epic
- Songwriters: Barry Gibb; Robin Gibb; Maurice Gibb
- Producer: Walter Afanasieff

Celine Dion singles chronology
"My Heart Will Go On" (1997)	"Immortality" (1998)	"Zora sourit" (1998)

Bee Gees singles chronology
"Still Waters (Run Deep)" (1997)	"Immortality" (1998)	"This Is Where I Came In" (2001)

Music video
- "Immortality" on YouTube

"Immortality" is a song recorded by Canadian singer Celine Dion for her fifth English-language studio album, Let's Talk About Love (1997). It was written by the Bee Gees, who also recorded backing vocals. Produced by Walter Afanasieff, "Immortality" was released as a single on 5 June 1998 outside the United States. It became a top ten single in Europe and a top forty single in Canada and Australia. Later, "Immortality" was included on the international editions of Dion's greatest hits albums, All the Way... A Decade of Song (1999), My Love: Essential Collection (2008), and The Best So Far... 2018 Tour Edition (2018).

== Background and release ==
The Bee Gees wrote "Immortality" in 1996 for the Saturday Night Fever stage musical. Their 1996 demo, with Barry Gibb singing in falsetto, was released in November 2001 on the Bee Gees' album Their Greatest Hits: The Record. The musical opened at London's Palladium Theatre in May 1998.

Dion recorded the song in June 1997, and the Bee Gees added backing vocals on 18 August 1997. Dion attended their session, which was filmed for the music video. "Immortality" was produced by Walter Afanasieff and included on Dion's fifth English-language studio album, Let's Talk About Love, released in November 1997. It was issued as a single in June 1998 outside the United States. The European and Australian singles include mainly remixes of her previous hit, "My Heart Will Go On".

The Saturday Night Fever: Original Cast Recording album, released in June 1999, includes the song performed by Adam Garcia. In Brazil, "Immortality" was used as the theme song for the primetime telenovela Torre de Babel. The Brazilian promotional single included remixes of "Immortality" by DJ Cuca.

== Critical reception ==
Pip Ellwood-Hughes from Entertainment Focus described the song as a "power ballad", adding that Dion and the Bee Gees' voices together "work well". Entertainment Weekly editor David Browne called it "banal" and described it as "a flimsy concoction that droops under the weight of its arrangement". The New York Observer editor Jonathan Bernstein described the collaboration as "dispiriting". Øyvin Søraa from Oppland Arbeiderblad called it "one of the most striking" songs on Let's Talk About Love. Bob Waliszewski of Plugged In wrote that it celebrates love and "its ability to inspire eternal romantic devotion". Christopher Smith from TalkAboutPopMusic described the song as a "smoothie", adding that "it has all the epic flare and charm of a Celine ballad but with added Bee-Gee high notes in the background".

== Commercial performance ==
"Immortality" was commercially successful in Europe, reaching number two in Germany and Austria, number five in the United Kingdom, number eight in Switzerland and Iceland, number 11 in Ireland, number 12 in Sweden, number 15 in France and Wallonia, and number 28 in the Netherlands. On the European Hot 100 Singles, "Immortality" peaked at number four. It was certified platinum in Germany, and gold in the United Kingdom, Canada, Sweden, France, and New Zealand. In Australia, the song reached number 38. In Canada, "Immortality" was issued as a promotional single and topped the Adult Contemporary chart for two weeks. It also reached number 28 on the Canadian Top Singles chart, based on airplay.

== Music video ==
Filmed on 18 August 1997 and directed by Scott Lochmus, the first music video shows Dion and the Bee Gees in the recording studio. In 1999, it was included on the Au cœur du stade DVD as part of the bonus material, showing the recording process of Let's Talk About Love. The second music video was directed by Randee St. Nicholas and filmed in July 1998 before being released on 6 August of the same year. This more elaborate video, which deals with themes of love, loss, and reincarnation, opens with Dion walking through a graveyard and sitting in front of a grave as she sings the first lines. It then moves to a mansion where she and the Bee Gees appear as ghosts. In one scene during the mansion sequence, Dion meets a man, presumably her lover. During the final pre-chorus until the coda, Dion and the Bee Gees appear at a club, where she performs as a singer and they appear as patrons. The video ends in the graveyard as Dion walks away.

== Live performances ==
On 14 November 1997, Dion performed "Immortality" with the Bee Gees at the MGM Grand Las Vegas. It was included on their live album and DVD, One Night Only, released in September 1998. In the first week of June 1998, Dion and the Bee Gees taped performances of "Immortality" on three television shows: Top of the Pops in the United Kingdom, Hit Machine in France, and Geld oder Liebe in Germany, for later broadcast. Dion also performed the song during the Let's Talk About Love World Tour in 1998 and 1999, and in her residency show Celine between 2015 and 2017. On 16 April 2017, CBS aired Stayin' Alive: A Grammy Salute to the Music of the Bee Gees, taped two months earlier, which included Dion performing "Immortality" as a tribute to the Bee Gees.

== Formats and track listings ==
- Australian cassette and CD single
1. "Immortality" – 4:11
2. "To Love You More" – 5:28
3. "My Heart Will Go On" (Richie Jones mix) – 4:15
4. "My Heart Will Go On" (Tony Moran mix) – 4:21
- European CD single
1. "Immortality" – 4:11
2. "My Heart Will Go On" (Tony Moran mix) – 4:21
- European CD maxi-single
1. "Immortality" – 4:11
2. "My Heart Will Go On" – 4:40
3. "My Heart Will Go On" (Tony Moran's anthem vocal) – 9:41
4. "My Heart Will Go On" (Soul Solution percappella) – 4:16
- European 12-inch single
1. "Immortality" – 4:11
2. "My Heart Will Go On" (Tony Moran mix) – 4:15
3. "My Heart Will Go On" (Tony Moran's anthem vocal) – 9:41
4. "My Heart Will Go On" (Matt & Vito's unsinkable epic mix) – 9:51
- Japanese CD single
1. "Immortality" – 4:12
2. "Where Is the Love" – 4:56
- UK cassette single
1. "Immortality" – 4:11
2. "My Heart Will Go On" (Soul Solution mix) – 4:18
- UK CD single #1
1. "Immortality" – 4:11
2. "To Love You More" – 5:28
3. "(You Make Me Feel Like A) Natural Woman" – 3:41
- UK CD single #2
1. "Immortality" – 4:11
2. "My Heart Will Go On" (Tony Moran mix) – 4:20
3. "My Heart Will Go On" (Richie Jones mix) – 4:16

== Charts ==
=== Weekly charts ===
Weekly chart performance
Chart (1998)	Peak position
Australia (ARIA)	38
Austria (Ö3 Austria Top 40)	2
Belgium (Ultratop 50 Flanders)	48
Belgium (Ultratop 50 Wallonia)	15
Canada Top Singles (RPM)	28
Canada Adult Contemporary (RPM)	1
Estonia (Eesti Top 20)	19
Europe (Eurochart Hot 100)	4
Finland Airplay (Suomen virallinen radiosoittolista)	19
France (SNEP)	15
Germany (GfK)	2
Iceland (Íslenski Listinn Topp 40)	8
Ireland (IRMA)	11
Netherlands (Dutch Top 40)	28
Netherlands (Single Top 100)	41
Poland Airplay (Music & Media)	4
Scottish Singles Sales (Official Charts)	6
Spain Airplay (Top 40 Radio)	23
Sweden (Sverigetopplistan)	12
Switzerland (Schweizer Hitparade)	8
UK Singles (Official Charts)	5
UK Airplay (Music Week)	15

=== Year-end charts ===
Year-end chart performance
Chart (1998)	Position
Austria (Ö3 Austria Top 40)	18
Belgium (Ultratop 50 Wallonia)	82
Canada Top Singles (RPM)	84
Canada Adult Contemporary (RPM)	13
Europe (European Hot 100 Singles)	27
France (SNEP)	67
Germany (Media Control)	10
Iceland (Íslenski Listinn Topp 40)	30
Sweden (Hitlistan)	28
Switzerland (Schweizer Hitparade)	22
UK Singles (OCC)	108

== Certifications ==
Certifications
Region	Certification	Certified units/sales
Canada (Music Canada)	Gold	40,000^{‡}
France (SNEP)	Gold	250,000^{*}
Germany (BVMI)	Platinum	500,000^{^}
New Zealand (RMNZ)	Gold	15,000^{‡}
Sweden (GLF)	Gold	15,000^{^}
United Kingdom (BPI)	Gold	400,000^{‡}
^{*} Sales figures based on certification alone.^{^} Shipments figures based on certification alone.^{‡} Sales+streaming figures based on certification alone.

== Release history ==
Release history
Region	Date	Format	Label	Ref.
Australia	5 June 1998	Cassette; CD	Epic	
Germany	5 June 1998	CD	Columbia	
France	8 June 1998	CD	Columbia	
United Kingdom	6 July 1998	Cassette; CD	Epic	
Japan	8 July 1998	CD	SMEJ	

== See also ==
- List of UK top-ten singles in 1998
