= The Reason (Celine Dion song) =

Single by Celine Dion

from the album Let's Talk About Love
- B-side: "Be the Man"
- Released: 24 November 1997
- Recorded: 1997
- Studio: AIR (London)
- Genre: Pop
- Length: 5:01 (album version); 4:30 (radio edit)
- Label: Columbia; Epic
- Songwriters: Carole King; Mark Hudson; Greg Wells
- Producer: George Martin

Celine Dion singles chronology
| "Be the Man" (1997) | "The Reason" (1997) | "My Heart Will Go On" (1997) |

Audio
- "The Reason" on YouTube

"The Reason" is a song by Canadian singer Celine Dion, recorded for her fifth English-language studio album, Let's Talk About Love (1997). Written by Carole King, Mark Hudson, and Greg Wells, and produced by Sir George Martin, it was released as the album's second single in selected European countries on 24 November 1997 by Columbia Records and Epic Records. In France, it was issued as a double A-side with "My Heart Will Go On". The accompanying music video, directed by Scott Lochmus, shows Dion recording the song in a studio.

== Background and release ==
"The Reason" was originally written for Aerosmith. Dion recorded it in 1997 and released it as the second single from Let's Talk About Love in November 1997 in several European markets, including the United Kingdom. A live recording was added as a bonus feature on the 1999 Au cœur du stade DVD. The track was later included on Dion's The Collector's Series, Volume One in 2000 and the European edition of My Love: Ultimate Essential Collection in 2008. Carole King recorded her own version for her 2001 album Love Makes the World, with Dion providing backing vocals.

== Critical reception ==
Smash Hits awarded the song four out of five, stating that it "starts off as you'd expect — all soft and lovely — then in come the strings and Celine steps up a gear", calling it "big", "Christmassy", and "top five". A reviewer from Music Week gave "The Reason" three out of five, writing that "Celine is back in classic power ballad territory here, though this track lacks the mega hooks of her previous hits. More of an album taster than a Christmas number one". The New York Observer editor Jonathan Bernstein wrote that the album "kicks off in time-honored fashion with a bombastic power ballad, 'The Reason', co-written by Carole King and produced by Sir George Martin", and criticized both contributors' recent output.

In a retrospective review, Pip Ellwood-Hughes of Entertainment Focus wrote that the track "immediately reminds you of why Dion has become such a powerhouse" and shows "how she can pack power and emotion into everything she sings". Bob Waliszewski of Plugged In wrote that the song celebrates love "and the affection of a good man". Christopher Smith of TalkAboutPopMusic described it as "a typical Celine mid-tempo ballad with plenty of high notes for Celine to hit and re-establish her presence".

== Music video ==
The music video for "The Reason", directed by Scott Lochmus and released in December 1997, shows Dion recording the song in the studio.

== Live performances ==
Dion performed "The Reason" during her Let's Talk About Love Tour, and as a duet with Carole King on VH1 Divas and at the 48th Italian Song Festival in February 1998, where she also performed "My Heart Will Go On". From 2011 to 2014, the song was part of the set list of Dion's Las Vegas residency, Celine. She also performed it during her 2017 tour and 2018 tour, at her BST Hyde Park concert in London on 5 July 2019, and during the first two US shows of her Courage World Tour in 2019.

== Formats and track listing ==
- European CD single
1. "The Reason" – 5:01
2. "Be the Man" – 4:39
- French CD single (double A-side)
1. "The Reason" – 5:01
2. "My Heart Will Go On" – 4:40
- UK cassette single
1. "The Reason" – 5:01
2. "Be the Man" – 4:39
3. "The Christmas Song" – 4:12
- European and UK CD single; French 12-inch single
1. "The Reason" – 5:01
2. "Be the Man" – 4:39
3. "Make You Happy" – 4:31
4. "With This Tear" – 4:12
- UK CD single #2
1. "The Reason" – 5:01
2. "Cherche encore" – 3:24
3. "Lovin' Proof" – 4:09
4. "The Christmas Song" – 4:12

== Charts ==
=== Weekly charts ===
Weekly chart performance
| Chart (1997–1998) | Peak position |
|---|---|
| Belgium (Ultratop 50 Flanders) | 78 |
| Belgium (Ultratop 50 Wallonia) | 59 |
| Europe (Eurochart Hot 100) | 12 |
| Europe (European Hit Radio) | 18 |
| France (SNEP) | 1^{[A]} |
| Iceland (Íslenski Listinn Topp 40) | 26 |
| Ireland (IRMA) | 13 |
| Scotland Singles (Official Charts) | 13 |
| Spain (Top 40 Radio) | 13 |
| UK Singles (Official Charts) | 11 |
| UK Airplay (Music Week) | 17 |

=== Year-end charts ===
1997 year-end chart performance
| Chart (1997) | Position |
|---|---|
| UK Singles (OCC) | 152 |

1998 year-end chart performance
| Chart (1998) | Position |
|---|---|
| France (SNEP) | 3^{[A]} |

== Certifications ==
Certifications
| Region | Certification | Certified units/sales |
|---|---|---|
| France (SNEP) | Diamond | 750,000^{*} |
| United Kingdom (BPI) | Silver | 200,000^{‡} |
^{*} Sales figures based on certification alone.

== Release history ==
Release history
| Region | Date | Format | Label | Ref. |
|---|---|---|---|---|
| Belgium | 24 November 1997 | CD | Columbia | |
| France | 24 November 1997 | CD | Columbia | |
| United Kingdom | 8 December 1997 | Cassette; CD | Epic | |

== See also ==
- French Top 100 singles of the 1990s
- List of number-one singles of 1998 (France)

== Notes ==
- A Released as a double A-side with "My Heart Will Go On".
