= All the Way... A Decade of Song =

Greatest hits album by Celine Dion
- Released: 12 November 1999
- Recorded: 1991–1999
- Genre: Pop
- Length: 71:58
- Labels: Columbia; Epic
- Producers: Walter Afanasieff; René Angélil; David Foster; Simon Franglen; Humberto Gatica; James Horner; R. Kelly; Robert John "Mutt" Lange; Kristian Lundin; Max Martin; Christopher Neil; Rick Nowels; Guy Roche; Matt Serletic; Billy Steinberg; Jim Steinman; Ric Wake

Celine Dion chronology
Au cœur du stade (1999)	All the Way... A Decade of Song (1999)	The Collector's Series, Volume One (2000)

Singles from All the Way... A Decade of Song
- 1. "That's the Way It Is" Released: 1 November 1999; 2. "Live (for the One I Love)" Released: 14 February 2000; 3. "The First Time Ever I Saw Your Face" Released: 27 March 2000; 4. "I Want You to Need Me" Released: 5 April 2000

All the Way... A Decade of Song is the first English-language greatest hits album by Canadian singer Celine Dion, released by Columbia Records and Epic Records on 12 November 1999. Conceived as a celebration of Dion's commercial success during the 1990s, the album combines nine of her most successful recordings with seven newly recorded tracks. Dion collaborated primarily with longtime producer David Foster on the new material, with additional contributions from leading pop producers including Max Martin, Kristian Lundin, Robert John "Mutt" Lange, James Horner, and Matt Serletic. The album became the best-selling greatest hits collection by a female solo artist in the United States during the Nielsen SoundScan era. It has sold over 22 million copies worldwide, including more than nine million in the United States, five million in Europe, two million in Japan, and one million in Canada.

Although All the Way... A Decade of Song received mixed critical reviews—many critics praised the strength of the included hits while questioning the decision to pair them with seven new recordings—the lead single, "That's the Way It Is", was widely acclaimed for its uplifting production and contemporary pop sound. The album was a major commercial success globally, debuting at number one in most major music markets. It ranked seventh on the US Billboard 200 Year-End chart for 2000 and 26th on the Billboard 200 Decade-End chart, cementing its status as one of Dion's most successful releases.

== Background ==
After 10 years of constant recording, touring, and global promotion, Dion announced that she would take an extended break from the music industry. "I'm looking forward to having no schedule, no pressure, to not caring about whether it's raining or not, just visiting with family and friends, cooking at home, trying to seriously have a child. I want no pressure for a while," she said in 1999. Before beginning her two‑year hiatus on 1 January 2000, Dion and her team assembled All the Way... A Decade of Song as a retrospective celebration of her achievements throughout the 1990s—a decade in which she sold over 100 million albums worldwide.

During this period, Dion evolved from a rising Canadian vocalist into one of the world's most successful and recognizable pop artists. Between 1990 and 1999, she released six English‑language studio albums—from Unison (1990) to All the Way... A Decade of Song—as well as six newly recorded French‑language albums. Her output earned her numerous accolades, including five Grammy Awards, and established her as one of the defining voices of the decade.

The creation of All the Way... A Decade of Song was a meticulous process. The team faced the challenge of balancing Dion's most iconic hits with a meaningful selection of new material that would offer listeners something fresh. "We had hourly conversations, back and forth, about what the combination should be," recalled John Doelp, the album's co‑executive producer. "We wanted to make sure we had some new sounds and that we were able to go to new places." Co‑executive producer Vito Luprano added that the project grew organically: "The first idea was to record three new songs, then Dion said, 'Let's go for five,' her lucky number. But we had so many great songs coming in that we ended up recording nine. Out of that, we decided to go with seven."

The resulting album blended Dion's most celebrated hits with new recordings crafted by some of the era's most influential producers, serving both as a capstone to her record‑breaking decade and as a final major release before her temporary retreat from the spotlight.

== Content ==
=== Album ===
All the Way... A Decade of Song contains nine greatest hits together with seven new songs in a single‑disc collection. The new material was created in collaboration with leading producers and songwriters, including Max Martin, Robert John "Mutt" Lange, James Horner and Will Jennings—the team behind "My Heart Will Go On"—as well as Quebec composer and producer Luc Plamondon, Diane Warren, and David Foster. The Horner and Jennings composition "Then You Look at Me" also appeared in December 1999 on the soundtrack of Bicentennial Man, starring Robin Williams. Plamondon's "Live (for the One I Love)", adapted from the original French song "Vivre", was later included on the 2000 English-language cast album of Notre-Dame de Paris.

The album's lead single, "That's the Way It Is", is an upbeat pop track co‑written and co‑produced by Max Martin, known for his work with contemporary pop artists. Other notable tracks include a reinterpretation of Roberta Flack's "The First Time Ever I Saw Your Face", which Dion performed acoustically during the Let's Talk About Love World Tour. The album also features the Mutt Lange ballad "If Walls Could Talk" with background vocals by Shania Twain, the Diane Warren power ballad "I Want You to Need Me", the orchestral ballad "Then You Look at Me", and a virtual duet with Frank Sinatra on "All the Way", the song Dion and René Angélil chose for their wedding.

Sony Music issued eight different versions of the album, each adapted to Dion's commercial profile in specific regions, including North America, Europe, France, Australia and New Zealand, Asia, Japan, Latin America, and Brazil.

=== DVD ===
In 2001, Sony Music released All the Way... A Decade of Song & Video on DVD. The release includes music videos for "If Walls Could Talk" and "Then You Look at Me", neither of which were issued as singles. It also features two performances from the 1999 CBS television special—"All the Way" and "The First Time Ever I Saw Your Face"—along with the music videos for the album's singles: "That's the Way It Is", "Live (for the One I Love)", and "I Want You to Need Me". The DVD additionally includes several earlier hits, some presented in live versions from the ...Live in Memphis 1997 home video. In late 2003, Sony Music Entertainment released a combined package featuring the All the Way... A Decade of Song CD and the All the Way... A Decade of Song & Video DVD in Europe and Australia.

== Singles ==
"That's the Way It Is" was released as the first single from the album in November 1999. It reached number six on the US Billboard Hot 100 and became a top-10 hit worldwide. In February 2000, "Live (for the One I Love)" was released as the second single in selected European countries, and in March 2000, "The First Time Ever I Saw Your Face" was issued as the next single in the United Kingdom, peaking at number 19. The second North American single, "I Want You to Need Me", was released in April 2000 and reached number one on the Canadian Singles Chart.

== Promotion ==
On 7 October 1999, Celine Dion taped her second CBS television special at Radio City Music Hall in New York. She performed "Love Can Move Mountains", "To Love You More" (with Taro Hakase on violin), "That's the Way It Is" (with 'N Sync), "All the Way" (a virtual duet with Frank Sinatra), "The First Time Ever I Saw Your Face", and a medley of "Here We Are", " Because You Loved Me", and "Conga" in a duet with Gloria Estefan. The television special aired on 22 November 1999 and was the second-most-watched program in its time slot, with an 8.3 rating and a 14 share. Dion also performed "That's the Way It Is" on various television and award shows in late 1999, before taking a two-year break from the music industry. On 31 December 1999, she gave her final concert at Montreal's Molson Centre, with guest Bryan Adams and several French-Canadian singers.

== Critical reception ==
Professional ratings
Review scores
Source	Rating
AllMusic	4/5 stars
Calgary Sun	3/5 stars
Q	2/5 stars
The Rolling Stone Album Guide	2/5 stars
Toronto Sun	3/5 stars

All the Way... A Decade of Song received generally mixed reviews from music critics. Although Stephen Thomas Erlewine of AllMusic awarded the album four out of five stars, he criticized the inclusion of seven new songs and only nine hits. He noted what he considered "glaring omissions", such as Dion's first American hit, "Where Does My Heart Beat Now", and her duet with Barbra Streisand, "Tell Him". Phil Sutcliffe of Q described the album as a "strange hybrid" that was "neither comprehensively greatest nor best". Dave Veitch of the Calgary Sun wrote that "fans may be disappointed" by the absence of certain hits.

Erlewine praised "It's All Coming Back to Me Now" and "My Heart Will Go On" as "among the best adult contemporary songs of the decade", but felt that aside from "That's the Way It Is" and "If Walls Could Talk", the new material lacked memorability. Michael Paoletta of Billboard gave the album a positive review. Discussing the seven new tracks, he wrote that All the Way... A Decade of Song was Dion's "most focused album yet", created with a team of collaborators who understood the singer's strengths.

Chuck Taylor of Billboard praised "That's the Way It Is", noting that Dion "at last ups the tempo with the irresistible first single". He commended her collaboration with Max Martin, Kristian Lundin and Andreas Carlsson, describing the track as "replete with a festive mandolin and a midtempo beat" and calling it "one of the most compelling radio releases yet" from "one of the core voices of the decade". Taylor also reviewed "I Want You to Need Me", writing that the pairing of Dion and Diane Warren was "as fine a fit as a trusty pair of Thom McAn's". He praised Warren's "heart-drenched words and dramatic melody writing" and Dion's "potent vocals", concluding that "divadom has never sounded so mighty".

== Commercial performance ==
All the Way... A Decade of Song topped charts around the world and was certified multi-platinum in numerous countries. During its first two years, the album had sold over 17 million copies globally. To date, it has sold over 22 million copies worldwide, making it the 15th best-selling album by a woman.

In the United States, All the Way... A Decade of Song debuted at number three on the Billboard 200 with sales of 303,000 copies, the second-largest opening of Dion's career after Let's Talk About Love (1997), which sold 334,000 units in its first week. The album rose by 30% in its second week (394,000 copies) and became her third number-one album. In its fifth week, it returned to the top, selling 537,000 units, becoming the first number-one album of the 2000s. It achieved its highest weekly sales in week six, selling 640,000 copies while placing at number two. On Billboard's list of the best-selling albums of 1999 in the US, All the Way... A Decade of Song ranked number 13 with sales of 2.9 million units. As of November 2019, it has sold 8,200,000 copies in the US according to Nielsen SoundScan, plus an additional 1,100,000 units through BMG Music Club. It was certified seven times platinum by the RIAA. It is the fourth best-selling greatest hits album in the US in the Nielsen SoundScan era and the best-selling greatest hits album by a female artist. According to Billboard, it was the 26th best-selling album of the 2000s in the US. In Canada and Quebec, the album debuted at number one. It shipped one million copies and was certified diamond by the CRIA.

In the United Kingdom, the album debuted at number one with sales of 74,681 copies. It became one of five Dion albums to surpass one million copies sold in the UK. As of October 2008, it has sold 1,318,223 units and was certified four times platinum by the BPI. In Germany, the album entered at number one and spent six non-consecutive weeks at the top. It was certified seven times gold by the BVMI for shipments of 1,050,000 copies. Overall, it sold over five million copies in Europe and was certified five times platinum by the IFPI. In Japan, the album peaked at number one and was certified double million by the RIAJ for shipments of two million copies. In Australia, the album topped the chart for two weeks and was certified five times platinum by the ARIA.

== Accolades ==
All the Way... A Decade of Song received the 2000 Japan Gold Disc Award for International Pop Album of the Year. "All the Way", Dion's duet with Frank Sinatra, was also nominated for the Grammy Award for Best Pop Collaboration with Vocals at the 43rd Grammy Awards.

== Track listing ==
Canadian / US edition
No.	Title	Writer(s)	Producer(s)	Length
1.	"The Power of Love" (radio edit)	Candy DeRouge; Gunther Mende; Mary Susan Applegate; Jennifer Rush	David Foster	4:48
2.	"If You Asked Me To"	Diane Warren	Guy Roche	3:55
3.	"Beauty and the Beast" (with Peabo Bryson)	Alan Menken; Howard Ashman	Walter Afanasieff	4:04
4.	"Because You Loved Me"	Warren	Foster	4:35
5.	"It's All Coming Back to Me Now" (radio edit)	Jim Steinman	Steinman; Steven Rinkoff^{[a]}; Roy Bittan^{[a]}	5:32
6.	"Love Can Move Mountains" (edit)	Warren	Ric Wake	4:01
7.	"To Love You More" (radio edit)	Foster; Junior Miles	Foster	4:41
8.	"My Heart Will Go On"	James Horner; Will Jennings	Afanasieff; Horner^{[a]}	4:42
9.	"I'm Your Angel" (with R. Kelly)	Kelly	Kelly	5:31
10.	"That's the Way It Is"	Kristian Lundin; Max Martin; Andreas Carlsson	Martin; Lundin	4:03
11.	"If Walls Could Talk"	Robert John "Mutt" Lange	Lange	5:19
12.	"The First Time Ever I Saw Your Face"	Ewan MacColl	Foster	4:09
13.	"All the Way" (with Frank Sinatra)	Jimmy Van Heusen; Sammy Cahn	Foster; René Angélil	3:53
14.	"Then You Look at Me"	Horner; Jennings	Foster; Horner; Simon Franglen	4:11
15.	"I Want You to Need Me"	Warren	Matt Serletic	4:36
16.	"Live (for the One I Love)"	Riccardo Cocciante; Luc Plamondon; Jennings	Foster; Humberto Gatica	3:58
Total length:				71:58

=== Notes ===
- ^{^a} signifies a co-producer
- All editions include seven new songs and the previous hits: "The Power of Love", "Beauty and the Beast", "Because You Loved Me", "It's All Coming Back to Me Now", "To Love You More", and "My Heart Will Go On". Other tracks vary by country:
  - All editions except for the Australasian edition include "I'm Your Angel". The Australasian edition includes "Falling into You".
  - All editions except for the Canadian and US editions include "Immortality". The Canadian and US editions include "If You Asked Me To" and "Love Can Move Mountains".
  - Asian editions include "Be the Man".
  - European (excluding French) and Australasian editions include "Think Twice".
  - French, Brazilian, and Japanese editions include "All by Myself"; Hispanic American editions include the Spanish-language version, "Sola Otra Vez".

== Personnel ==
Adapted from AllMusic.

- René Angélil – producer
- Kenny Aronoff – drums
- David Ashton – engineer
- Chris Brooke – assistant engineer, assistant vocal engineer, mixing, mixing assistant
- Andreas Carlsson – background vocals
- Terry Chiazza – A&R
- Luis Conte – percussion
- Celine Dion – liner notes, primary artist, vocals
- Mark Dobson – digital editing, pro-tools
- John Doelp – executive producer
- Felipe Elgueta – engineer, producer, programming, synthesizer programming
- Frank Filipetti – engineer
- David Foster – arranger, keyboards, producer, vocal arrangement, background vocals
- Simon Franglen – arranger, engineer, keyboards, producer, synclavier, synclavier programming, synthesizer, synthesizer programming
- Matthew Freeman – production coordination
- Michel Gallone – assistant engineer, assistant vocal engineer
- Humberto Gatica – engineer, mixing, vocal engineer, vocals
- John Gilutin – keyboards, piano
- Andy Haller – engineer, second engineer
- Leah Haywood – background vocals
- Nana Hedin – background vocals
- John Herman – engineer, engineering consultant
- Jack Hersca – transfers
- James Horner – arranger, orchestration, producer
- Suzie Katayama – conductor
- Robert John "Mutt" Lange – producer, background vocals
- Ron Last – assistant engineer, assistant vocal engineer, mixing
- Jesse Levy – orchestra manager
- Tomas Lindberg – bass
- Jeremy Lubbock – string arrangements
- Kristian Lundin – engineer, keyboards, mixing, producer, programming
- Vito Luprano – executive producer
- Max Martin – engineer, keyboards, mixing, producer, programming, background vocals
- Vladimir Meller – mastering
- Richard Meyer – programming
- Esbjörn Öhrwall – guitar
- Valerie Pack – production coordination
- Maya Panvell – A&R
- Dean Parks – guitar, acoustic guitar
- Simon Rhodes – engineer
- John Robinson – drums
- Will Rogers – assistant vocal engineer
- Olle Romo – programming
- William Ross – arranger, conductor, orchestral arrangements, string arrangements
- Jacques Saugy – guitar
- Danny Schneider – technical engineer
- Matt Serletic – arranger, orchestration, producer
- Leland Sklar – bass
- David Thoener – engineer
- Michael Thompson – guitar, electric guitar
- Shania Twain – background vocals

== Charts ==
=== Weekly charts ===
Weekly chart performance
Chart (1999–2002)	Peak position
Argentine Albums (CAPIF)	5
Australian Albums (ARIA)	1
Austrian Albums (Ö3 Austria)	1
Belgian Albums (Ultratop Flanders)	2
Belgian Albums (Ultratop Wallonia)	1
Canada Top Albums/CDs (RPM)	1
Canadian Albums (Billboard)	1
Czech Albums (ČNS IFPI)	12
Danish Albums (Hitlisten)	2
Dutch Albums (Album Top 100)	1
European Albums (Music & Media)	1
Finnish Albums (Suomen virallinen lista)	1
French Compilations (SNEP)	1
German Albums (Offizielle Top 100)	1
Greek Albums (IFPI)	1
Hungarian Albums (MAHASZ)	9
Icelandic Albums (Tónlist)	1
Irish Albums (IRMA)	1
Italian Albums (FIMI)	4
Japanese Albums (Oricon)	1
Malaysian Albums (RIM)	3
New Zealand Albums (RMNZ)	2
Norwegian Albums (VG-lista)	1
Portuguese Albums (AFP)	4
Quebec Albums (ADISQ)	1
Scottish Albums (Official Charts)	2
Spanish Albums (PROMUSICAE)	1
Swedish Albums (Sverigetopplistan)	1
Swiss Albums (Schweizer Hitparade)	1
UK Albums (Official Charts)	1
US Billboard 200	1
US Top Catalog Albums (Billboard)	2

=== Monthly charts ===
Monthly chart performance
Chart (2000)	Peak position
South Korean Albums (RIAK)	6

=== Year-end charts ===
1999 year-end chart performance
Chart (1999)	Position
Australian Albums (ARIA)	15
Austrian Albums (Ö3 Austria)	47
Belgian Albums (Ultratop Flanders)	6
Belgian Albums (Ultratop Wallonia)	10
Canada Top Albums/CDs (RPM)	95
Danish Albums (Hitlisten)	35
Dutch Albums (Album Top 100)	45
European Albums (Music & Media)	29
French Compilations (SNEP)	1
German Albums (Offizielle Top 100)	53
Japanese Albums (Oricon)	68
Norwegian Christmas Period Albums (VG-lista)	1
Spanish Albums (PROMUSICAE)	32
Swedish Albums (Sverigetopplistan)	4
Swiss Albums (Schweizer Hitparade)	27
UK Albums (OCC)	12

2000 year-end chart performance
Chart (2000)	Position
Australian Albums (ARIA)	38
Austrian Albums (Ö3 Austria)	23
Belgian Albums (Ultratop Flanders)	24
Belgian Albums (Ultratop Wallonia)	26
Canadian Albums (SoundScan)	27
Danish Albums (Hitlisten)	30
Dutch Albums (Album Top 100)	24
European Albums (Music & Media)	11
Finnish Foreign Albums (Suomen virallinen lista)	14
French Compilations (SNEP)	14
German Albums (Offizielle Top 100)	19
Japanese Albums (Oricon)	26
New Zealand Albums (RMNZ)	8
Swedish Albums (Sverigetopplistan)	68
Swiss Albums (Schweizer Hitparade)	6
UK Albums (OCC)	55
US Billboard 200	7

2001 year-end chart performance
Chart (2001)	Position
US Billboard 200	198

2002 year-end chart performance
Chart (2002)	Position
US Top Catalog Albums (Billboard)	10

2003 year-end chart performance
Chart (2003)	Position
US Top Catalog Albums (Billboard)	16

2004 year-end chart performance
Chart (2004)	Position
US Top Catalog Albums (Billboard)	30

2008 year-end chart performance
Chart (2008)	Position
UK Albums (OCC)	142
US Top Catalog Albums (Billboard)	22

=== Decade-end charts ===
Decade-end chart performance
Chart (2000–2009)	Position
US Billboard 200	26
US Top Catalog Albums (Billboard)	38

=== All-time charts ===
All-time chart performance
Chart	Position
Canadian Artists Albums (SoundScan)	6
Irish Albums Female Artists (OCC)	19

== Certifications and sales ==
Certifications
Region	Certification	Certified units/sales
Argentina (CAPIF)	Platinum	60,000^{^}
Australia (ARIA)	5× Platinum	350,000^{‡}
Austria (IFPI Austria)	Platinum	50,000^{*}
Belgium (BRMA)	3× Platinum	150,000^{*}
Brazil (Pro-Música Brasil)	Platinum	250,000^{*}
Canada (Music Canada)	Diamond	1,000,000^{^}
Finland (Musiikkituottajat)	Platinum	55,713
France (SNEP)	2× Platinum	600,000^{*}
Germany (BVMI)	7× Gold	1,050,000^{^}
Hungary (MAHASZ)	Gold	
Japan (RIAJ)	2× Million	2,000,000^{^}
New Zealand (RMNZ)	5× Platinum	75,000^{^}
Norway (IFPI Norway)	2× Platinum	100,000^{*}
Poland (ZPAV)	Platinum	70,000^{*}
Singapore (RIAS)	Gold	5,000^{*}
South Korea	—	95,066
Spain (Promusicae)	2× Platinum	200,000^{^}
Sweden (GLF)	2× Platinum	160,000^{^}
Switzerland (IFPI Switzerland)	3× Platinum	150,000^{^}
United Kingdom (BPI)	4× Platinum	1,318,223
United States (RIAA)	7× Platinum	9,300,000 (Note: As of November 2019, All the Way... A Decade of Song has sold 8,200,000 copies in the United States according to Nielsen SoundScan, with an additional 1,100,000 units sold at BMG Music Club. SoundScan does not count albums sold through clubs like the BMG Music Service, which were significantly popular in the 1990s.)
Summaries
Europe (IFPI)	5× Platinum	5,000,000^{*}
Worldwide	—	22,000,000
^{*} Sales figures based on certification alone.^{^} Shipments figures based on certification alone.^{‡} Sales+streaming figures based on certification alone.

== Release history ==
Release history
Region	Date	Label	Format	Catalog
Europe	12 November 1999	Columbia	CD; cassette	496094 2; 496094 4
Japan	13 November 1999	SMEJ	CD	ESCA-8070
United States	16 November 1999	550	CD; cassette	BK 63760; BT 63760
Australia	19 November 1999	Epic	CD; cassette	495111 2; 495111 4

== See also ==
- List of best-selling albums
- List of best-selling albums in Europe
- List of best-selling albums in Germany
- List of best-selling albums in Japan
- List of Billboard 200 number-one albums of 1999
- List of Billboard 200 number-one albums of 2000
- List of Diamond-certified albums in Canada
- List of European number-one hits of 1999
- List of European number-one hits of 2000
- List of number-one albums in Australia during the 1990s
- List of number-one albums of 1999 (Canada)
- List of number-one albums of 2000 (Spain)
- List of Oricon number-one albums of 1999
- List of top 25 albums for 1999 in Australia
- List of UK Albums Chart number ones of the 1990s
