= Theda Sandiford =

American mixed-media artist

Theda Sandiford is a mixed-media and installation artist who lives and works in Jersey City, New Jersey.

== Work ==
Sandiford's sculptural work often utilizes found or recycled materials to make cultural commentary. Sandiford repurposes everyday materials including shopping carts, reusable shopping bag, and post-consumer waste in her sculptures. Sandiford takes lived experiences and engrains those into her work including experiences of microaggressions she's encountered as a marginalized person. Sandiford's work engages and investigates the sense of touch, reflecting on the artist's own experience of touch, including having her hair frequently touched without permission.

== Exhibitions ==
- 2016 - VANITY - Jersey City Theater Center, NJ
- 2021 - MoCADA House - Governors Island, NY
- 2022 - JOYFUL RESISTANCE - Ivy Brown Gallery, NY

== Awards ==
Sandiford received the Excellence in Fibers VI from Fiber Art Now, the 2020 Jersey City Arts Visual Artist Award, the 2021 Fellowship in Craft from the New Jersey State Council on the Arts, and the 2022 Jersey City Arts Council Individual Artist Fellowship.
