= Let's Talk About Love =

Studio album by Celine Dion
- Released: 14 November 1997
- Recorded: 1997
- Studios: AIR (London); WallyWorld (San Rafael); Record Plant (Los Angeles); Hit Factory (New York); Middle Ear (Miami); Cove City Sound (Glen Cove); Dream Factory (New York); Chartmaker (Malibu); Eden (London); Paramount (Hollywood); Masterphonics (Nashville); Sunset Sound (Hollywood)
- Genre: Pop
- Length: 74:28
- Labels: Columbia; Epic
- Producers: Walter Afanasieff; David Foster; Humberto Gatica; Corey Hart; George Martin; Billy Pace; Tony Renis; Ric Wake

Celine Dion chronology
| Live à Paris (1996) | Let's Talk About Love (1997) | S'il suffisait d'aimer (1998) |

Singles from Let's Talk About Love
- 1. "Tell Him" Released: 7 October 1997; 2. "Be the Man" Released: 13 November 1997; 3. "The Reason" Released: 24 November 1997; 4. "My Heart Will Go On" Released: 24 November 1997; 5. "Immortality" Released: 5 June 1998; 6. "Treat Her Like a Lady" Released: 19 March 1999

Let's Talk About Love is the fifteenth studio album and fifth English-language release by Canadian singer Celine Dion, issued on 14 November 1997 by Columbia Records and Epic Records. Conceived as the follow-up to the global success of Falling into You (1996), the album marked a further development of Dion's pop sound, combining contemporary ballads with adult contemporary elements and collaborations with well-known artists.

Recorded in multiple international studios, Let's Talk About Love includes contributions from artists such as Barbra Streisand, the Bee Gees, Luciano Pavarotti, Carole King, George Martin, Diana King, Brownstone, and Corey Hart. Dion also worked again with long-time producers David Foster, Ric Wake, Walter Afanasieff, Humberto Gatica, and Jim Steinman. The album contains Dion's signature song, "My Heart Will Go On", written by James Horner and Will Jennings as the love theme for James Cameron's 1997 film Titanic. The single became a major international success, topping charts worldwide and becoming one of the best-selling singles in history.

Upon release, Let's Talk About Love received mainly positive reviews from music critics. The album and its songs received numerous awards and nominations. "My Heart Will Go On" won four Grammy Awards, including Record of the Year, Song of the Year, Best Female Pop Vocal Performance, and Best Song Written Specifically for a Motion Picture or for Television. The album was nominated for Best Pop Vocal Album, and the duet "Tell Him" received a nomination for Best Pop Collaboration with Vocals.

With more than 31 million copies sold worldwide, Let's Talk About Love ranks among the best-selling albums in history. It topped charts in many countries, including the United States, Canada, the United Kingdom, France, and Australia, and was one of the best-selling albums of both 1997 and 1998. It received diamond, multi-platinum, platinum, and gold certifications in markets around the world.

Several singles were released internationally, adapted to regional markets. Alongside the global success of "My Heart Will Go On", other singles included "Tell Him", "Be the Man", "The Reason", "To Love You More", "Immortality", "Miles to Go (Before I Sleep)", and "Treat Her Like a Lady". The album is often noted as a significant release in Dion's career and a major pop album of the late 1990s.

== Conception and composition ==
Following the worldwide success of Falling into You (1996), Let's Talk About Love was developed as an internationally oriented project recorded in London, New York, and Los Angeles. The album brought together a wide range of collaborators, reflecting Celine Dion's rising global profile and her work across pop, classical, and contemporary styles. Guest artists included Barbra Streisand on the duet "Tell Him", the Bee Gees on "Immortality", Italian tenor Luciano Pavarotti on "I Hate You Then I Love You", and Jamaican singer Diana King with American R&B group Brownstone on "Treat Her Like a Lady".

One of the album's central tracks, "The Reason", was co-written by Carole King and produced by George Martin, known for his work with The Beatles. The album's most widely recognized recording, the ballad "My Heart Will Go On", was composed by James Horner with lyrics by Will Jennings. Used as the love theme for the 1997 film Titanic, the song achieved major international success and became closely associated with Dion's career.

Production on Let's Talk About Love was led by David Foster, Ric Wake, Walter Afanasieff, Humberto Gatica, and Corey Hart, who shaped the album's mix of orchestral ballads, contemporary pop, and crossover material. The tracklist also includes several cover songs, such as Leo Sayer's "When I Need You" and Mina's "Grande grande grande", adapted as the English-language duet "I Hate You Then I Love You".

Multiple editions of the album were issued by Columbia Records and Epic Records for different regional markets. In addition to the standard 13 tracks, "To Love You More" appeared on the US and Latin American editions, "Be the Man" on the European, Australian, and Asian editions, "Amar Haciendo el Amor" on releases outside the United States, and "Where Is the Love" on editions outside Latin America. These variations supported the album's reach in international markets.

== Singles ==
The album was supported by a series of international singles. The lead single, "Tell Him", a duet with Barbra Streisand, premiered on US radio on 7 October 1997. Although it was not commercially released in the United States and therefore did not enter the Billboard Hot 100, the physical single was issued on 31 October 1997 in Germany and on 3 November 1997 across Europe and Australia, where it became a major hit. The song reached number one in the Netherlands and entered the top 10 in Ireland, Belgium, the United Kingdom, France, Italy, Spain, Switzerland, Norway, and Australia. It earned platinum certifications in the Netherlands, Belgium, and Australia, and gold in the UK, France, Australia, Switzerland, and Norway. In Japan, "Be the Man" was released as the first single on 13 November 1997, peaking at number 24 on the Oricon chart and receiving a platinum certification from the RIAJ.

Between 5 and 8 December 1997, "The Reason" was issued as the second single in select European markets. It charted in Belgium and reached just outside the top 10 in the UK and Ireland.

"My Heart Will Go On", the love theme from Titanic, premiered on US radio on 25 November 1997 and was released commercially on 10 February 1998. It debuted at number one on the Billboard Hot 100, where it remained for two weeks, and was certified four times platinum in the United States. The physical single was first issued in Germany on 5 December 1997 and later that month in Australia, with most international releases following in January 1998. In France, it appeared as a double A‑side with "The Reason", while in the UK it was released on 9 February 1998. The song topped charts worldwide for multiple weeks, becoming Dion's biggest hit, one of the best‑selling singles of all time, and the world's best‑selling single of 1998. Often regarded as Dion's signature song, it received diamond, multi‑platinum, platinum, and gold certifications globally, including four million copies sold in the United States, 2.4 million in the UK, two million in Germany, and 1.2 million in France.

"To Love You More" was released as a promotional single in the United States on 5 May 1998. Although ineligible for the Billboard Hot 100, it topped the Adult Contemporary chart and reached number 11 on the Hot 100 Airplay ranking. "Immortality", recorded with the Bee Gees, followed as the next commercial single in Europe, Australia, and Canada in June 1998. It was first released on 5 June 1998 in Germany and three days later in France, with a UK release on 6 July 1998. The song reached the top 10 in Germany, Austria, the UK, and Switzerland, and received platinum certification in Germany and gold in the United Kingdom, France, Canada, New Zealand, and Sweden.

In late September 1998, "Miles to Go (Before I Sleep)" entered the Canadian Adult Contemporary chart, peaking at number 17. The final single, "Treat Her Like a Lady" (with Diana King and Brownstone), was released in select European countries, appearing on 19 March 1999 in Germany and 28 June 1999 in the UK. It reached the top 40 in Austria, the UK, and Ireland.

== Promotion ==
In the United States, Dion began promoting Let's Talk About Love with a performance of the title track on Good Morning America in November 1997. That same month, she joined the Bee Gees on stage to perform "Immortality" during their One Night Only concert in Las Vegas. In December 1997, she performed "My Heart Will Go On" on The Rosie O'Donnell Show, The Tonight Show with Jay Leno, and at the Music for UNICEF Concert in New York. On 14 December 1997, she also attended the premiere of Titanic in Hollywood.

In January 1998, Dion performed "My Heart Will Go On" and "Let's Talk About Love" on The Today Show, followed by another performance of "My Heart Will Go On" on The Oprah Winfrey Show in February. She sang the song at the 40th Annual Grammy Awards on 25 February 1998 and at the 70th Academy Awards on 23 March 1998. In April 1998, Dion performed "Treat Her Like a Lady" with Diana King and Brownstone at the Essence Awards in New York. Later that month, she appeared at the inaugural VH1 Divas concert, performing "My Heart Will Go On", "The Reason" (with Carole King), and other selections alongside artists such as Aretha Franklin, Mariah Carey, Gloria Estefan, and Shania Twain. In May 1998, she returned to The Rosie O'Donnell Show to perform "To Love You More".

Dion also promoted the album widely outside the United States. In November 1997, she performed "Let's Talk About Love", "When I Need You", and "Treat Her Like a Lady" during the Canadian television special Parlons d'amour. That month, she also performed "The Reason" on the Dutch program Kanjer Surprise. In December 1997, Dion sang "The Reason" on The Lottery Show and performed both "The Reason" and "My Heart Will Go On" at the Smash Hits Poll Winners Party in the United Kingdom. She also appeared on Fantastico in Italy and Les Années Tubes in France.

In January 1998, Dion performed "My Heart Will Go On" on Des O'Connor Tonight in the UK, followed by appearances on Top of the Pops in the UK, Wetten, dass..? in Germany, and the Sanremo Music Festival in Italy in February 1998, where she also performed "The Reason". In April 1998, she appeared on the French television special La Soirée Spéciale: Céline Dion, performing "My Heart Will Go On", "Let's Talk About Love", "Treat Her Like a Lady" with Diana King, and "The Reason". In June 1998, she performed on the French program Hit Machine, singing "The Reason", "Treat Her Like a Lady" with Diana King, "Immortality" with the Bee Gees, and "My Heart Will Go On". That same month, she performed "My Heart Will Go On" and "Immortality" with the Bee Gees on the German show Geld Oder Liebe. On 9 June 1998, Dion joined Luciano Pavarotti at the Pavarotti & Friends charity concert in Italy, performing "I Hate You Then I Love You and "My Heart Will Go On". In July 1998, she reunited with the Bee Gees to perform "Immortality" on Top of the Pops in the UK.

On 21 August 1998, Dion began the Let's Talk About Love World Tour in Boston. She toured North America through the end of 1998, performed in Asia in early 1999, and returned to North America in March and April 1999. She continued the tour in Europe in June and July 1999 before concluding with additional North American dates later that year. Several European concerts scheduled for May and June 1999 were cancelled following the diagnosis of her husband René Angélil with throat cancer. In August and September 1999, the live album Au cœur du stade and its accompanying DVD were released in Europe and Canada, presenting the Francophone setlist from the tour.

== Critical reception ==
Professional ratings
Review scores
| Source | Rating |
|---|---|
| AllMusic | 4/5 stars |
| Billboard (Paul Verna) | positive |
| Billboard (Larry Flick) | positive |
| The Boston Globe | positive |
| Entertainment Weekly | C |
| The Guardian | 2/5 stars |
| Los Angeles Times | 2/4 stars |
| Music Week | 4/5 stars |
| Public | 17/20 |
| Toronto Star | 3.5/4 stars |

Let's Talk About Love received generally positive reviews, with many critics praising its scale and vocal performances, while some offered more cautious responses to its stylistic range.

Billboard editor Paul Verna offered one of the strongest endorsements, praising Dion's "super-charged vocals" and identifying tracks such as "Immortality", "To Love You More", "The Reason", "Us", and "My Heart Will Go On" as highlights. Larry Flick, also writing for Billboard, described "My Heart Will Go On" as a carefully delivered ballad and noted Dion's ability "to pack volumes of emotion in a whisper".

At AllMusic, senior editor Stephen Thomas Erlewine awarded the album four out of five stars, calling it a well‑constructed mainstream release intended to build on the success of Falling into You. He praised the ballads, the duets, and the contributions from leading adult contemporary producers, while noting that the album's wide stylistic range may feel extensive to some listeners. He concluded that those drawn to its major singles would find much to appreciate.

Steve Morse of The Boston Globe praised the album's polished production and Dion's "unshakable vocal authority", describing it as confident, radio‑ready pop. Peter Howell of the Toronto Star awarded the album three and a half stars out of four, calling it "a sweeping, emotionally charged pop statement" and noting Dion's ability to elevate even the most elaborate arrangements. Music Week also responded positively, praising the album's melodic focus, production quality, and Dion's consistent vocal strength. The review noted its balance of ballads and mainstream pop and described it as one of the year's notable commercial releases. The French outlet Public gave the album a score of 17/20, citing its emotional impact and Dion's vocal command, and describing it as one of her most accomplished works.

Other publications offered more reserved assessments. Entertainment Weekly's David Browne graded the album a C, suggesting that its large-scale production and numerous guest appearances sometimes overshadowed the songwriting, though he acknowledged Dion's commitment to each track. Elysa Gardner of the Los Angeles Times awarded the album two out of four stars, praising Dion's technical skill while noting that her delivery at times lacked the interpretive nuance associated with classic pop vocalists.

== Commercial performance ==
Before its release, Sony announced advance orders of 10 million copies worldwide. By the end of 1998, Let's Talk About Love had sold 27 million copies globally (including 8.1 million in the US and 1.7 million in Canada), making it the year's best‑selling album both domestically and internationally. To date, the album has sold over 31 million copies worldwide, placing it among the best‑selling albums by a female artist and among the best‑selling albums in history.

=== United States ===
In the United States, the album debuted at number two with first‑week sales of 334,000 copies. Its weekly sales rose in the following weeks, reaching 624,000 copies in its sixth week while it remained at number two. Let's Talk About Love reached number one on the Billboard 200 in January 1998. It spent 17 weeks at number two and became the best‑selling studio album of the year in the US (second overall), with 7.9 million copies sold. The album was certified diamond by the RIAA in November 1999 for shipments exceeding 10 million copies. As of February 2013, it had sold 9,601,000 copies according to Nielsen SoundScan, with an additional 1,110,000 units sold through the BMG Music Club. SoundScan figures do not include club sales, which were common in the 1990s.

=== Canada ===
In Canada, the album was certified diamond after three weeks, with one million copies sold in that period. It debuted at number one with 230,212 copies sold, setting a national opening‑week record later surpassed by the 306,000‑copy debut of Adele's 25 (2015). Let's Talk About Love has sold 1.7 million copies in Canada and topped both the Canadian and Quebec charts for two weeks.

=== UK, France, and Germany ===
In the United Kingdom, the album debuted at number one and spent five non‑consecutive weeks at the top. It was certified six‑times platinum by the BPI in October 1998 and sold two million copies. In France, it spent seven weeks at number one and was certified diamond in April 1998, with sales of 1,610,000 units. Let's Talk About Love also became Dion's first number‑one album in Germany, where it spent five weeks at the top and was certified triple platinum by the BVMI for 1.5 million copies sold.

=== Other markets ===
The album sold over one million units in Japan and was certified million by the RIAJ. In Australia, it debuted at number one, spent five non‑consecutive weeks at the top, and was certified seven‑times platinum by the ARIA. Let's Talk About Love reached number one in many other markets and received diamond, multi‑platinum, platinum, and gold certifications in numerous countries. It has sold over 10 million copies in Europe (ten‑times IFPI Platinum Europe Award) and more than two million units in Latin America.

== Accolades ==
At the 41st Annual Grammy Awards, "My Heart Will Go On" received four major awards: Record of the Year, Best Female Pop Vocal Performance, Song of the Year, and Best Song Written Specifically for a Motion Picture or Television. Let's Talk About Love was also nominated for Best Pop Album. One year earlier, "Tell Him" was nominated for Best Pop Collaboration with Vocals.

At the American Music Awards of 1999, Dion won Favorite Pop/Rock Female Artist and Favorite Adult Contemporary Artist. Let's Talk About Love was nominated for Favorite Pop/Rock Album, while Titanic: Music from the Motion Picture won Favorite Soundtrack. In 1998, Dion received six Billboard Music Awards, including Top Billboard 200 Album Artist, Top Billboard 200 Album Artist – Female, Hot Adult Contemporary Artist, and Hot Soundtrack Single ("My Heart Will Go On"). Titanic: Music from the Motion Picture also won Top Billboard 200 Album and Hot Soundtrack Album. Additional Billboard nominations included Top Pop Artist – Female, Hot Adult Contemporary Singles & Tracks ("My Heart Will Go On"), and Top Billboard 200 Album (Let's Talk About Love).

At the Juno Awards of 1999, Dion won four awards: Best Female Vocalist, Best Album (Let's Talk About Love), Best Selling Album (Foreign or Domestic) (Let's Talk About Love) and the International Achievement Award. She also received nominations for Best Single ("My Heart Will Go On"), Best Pop Album (Let's Talk About Love), Best Selling Album (Foreign or Domestic) (Titanic: Music from the Motion Picture) and the Producer of the Year (for Corey Hart's work on "Miles to Go (Before I Sleep)" and "Where Is the Love").

Dion received two World Music Awards: World's Best Selling Canadian Artist of the Year (1998) and World's Best Selling Female Pop Artist of the Year (1999). At the 25th People's Choice Awards, she won Favorite Female Musical Performer. In 1998, she also received three VH1 Awards: Artist of the Year, Best Female Artist and Diva of the Year. "My Heart Will Go On" also won the Academy Award for Best Original Song and the Golden Globe Award for Best Original Song.

Other honors included the Amigo Award for Best International Female Artist, the ASCAP Film and Television Music Award for Most Performed Song from Motion Picture ("My Heart Will Go On"), and multiple ASCAP Pop Awards for Most Performed Songs ("My Heart Will Go On" twice and "To Love You More"). She also received the Blockbuster Entertainment Award for Favourite Song from a Movie ("My Heart Will Go On"), the BMI Film & TV Award for Most Performed Song from a Film, and several BMI Pop Awards for Most Performed Songs ("My Heart Will Go On" and "To Love You More" twice).

Dion won the Gold Otto for Female Singer at the Bravo Otto Awards, the Echo Award for International Female Artist of the Year (1999), the Félix Award for Artist of the Year Achieving the Most Success in a Language Other Than French (1999), and the Gémeaux Award for Best Variety Special (Let's Talk About Love avec Céline Dion). Additional awards included the Hungarian Music Award for International Album of the Year (Let's Talk About Love), two Japan Gold Disc Awards (International Artist of the Year and International Pop Album of the Year), the Japan Record Award for Special Achievement ("My Heart Will Go On"), the Las Vegas Film Critics Society Award for Best Song, the Malta Music Award for Best Selling Female International Artist, the MuchMusic Video Award for Peoples Choice: Favourite Artist ("My Heart Will Go On"), the NARM Best Seller Award for 1997–1998 Soundtrack (Titanic: Music from the Motion Picture), the Performance Magazine Award for Best Pop Act, the Pop Corn Music Award for Best Female Singer of the Year, two Satellite Awards (Best Original Song and Best Original Score for Titanic: Music from the Motion Picture), and the South African Music Award for Best Selling International Album (Let's Talk About Love).

Dion also received nominations for the Brit Award for Best International Female (1998), the MTV Europe Music Award for Best Female, the MTV Video Music Award for Best Video from a Film ("My Heart Will Go On"), and the MTV Video Music Award – Viewer's Choice ("My Heart Will Go On"). Additional nominations included the Danish Music Awards (Best International Female Singer and Best International Hit), the Edison Awards (Best International Female Singer and Single of the Year for "Tell Him"), and the Fryderyk Award for Best Foreign Album (Let's Talk About Love). Her television special Celine Dion – Let's Talk About Love was also nominated for a Gemini Award for Best Photography in a Comedy, Variety or Performing Arts Program or Series.

== Impact and legacy ==
ET Canada included four of Dion's albums—including Let's Talk About Love—in its ranking of the ten most successful Canadian music albums of all time.

The album strengthened Dion's profile as an international pop artist, particularly following the global success of its lead single, "My Heart Will Go On", which became widely associated with her career. Let's Talk About Love is often listed among the best‑selling English‑language albums by a Canadian performer, with worldwide sales reported at over 31 million copies.

The album played a role in the late‑1990s popularity of adult contemporary ballads and presented a mix of pop, operatic, and cinematic elements. Its collaborations with artists such as Barbra Streisand, Luciano Pavarotti, and Carole King demonstrated Dion's range and contributed to its international reach. Several vocalists have noted Dion's vocal approach as an influence on their own work.

In retrospective commentary, Let's Talk About Love is frequently discussed as a representative example of late‑1990s pop production. Its continued cultural visibility—supported by its association with the film Titanic—has secured the album a lasting place in discussions of popular music from the era.

== Track listing ==
European / Australian / Asian edition
| No. | Title | Writer(s) | Producer(s) | Length |
|---|---|---|---|---|
| 1. | "The Reason" | Carole King; Mark Hudson; Greg Wells | George Martin; Giles Martin^{[a]} | 5:01 |
| 2. | "Immortality" (with the Bee Gees) | Barry Gibb; Robin Gibb; Maurice Gibb | Walter Afanasieff | 4:11 |
| 3. | "Treat Her Like a Lady" | Diana King; Andy Marvel; Billy Mann; Celine Dion | Ric Wake | 4:05 |
| 4. | "Why Oh Why" | Marti Sharron; Danny Sembello | David Foster | 4:50 |
| 5. | "Love Is on the Way" | Peter Zizzo; Denise Rich; Tina Shafer | Wake | 4:25 |
| 6. | "Tell Him" (with Barbra Streisand) | Linda Thompson; Afanasieff; Foster | Foster; Afanasieff | 4:51 |
| 7. | "Amar Haciendo el Amor" | Mann; Rich; Manny Benito | Wake; Humberto Gatica^{[b]} | 4:11 |
| 8. | "When I Need You" | Albert Hammond; Carole Bayer Sager | Foster | 4:12 |
| 9. | "Miles to Go (Before I Sleep)" | Corey Hart | Hart | 4:40 |
| 10. | "Us" | Billy Pace | Gatica; Pace; Jim Steinman^{[c]} | 5:47 |
| 11. | "Just a Little Bit of Love" | Maria Christensen; Arnie Roman; Arthur Jacobson | Wake | 4:06 |
| 12. | "My Heart Will Go On" | James Horner; Will Jennings | Afanasieff; Horner^{[d]} | 4:40 |
| 13. | "Where Is the Love" | Hart | Hart | 4:55 |
| 14. | "Be the Man" | Foster; Miles | Foster | 4:39 |
| 15. | "I Hate You Then I Love You" (with Luciano Pavarotti) | Tony Renis; Manuel de Falla; Alberto Testa; Fabio Testa; Norman Newell | Foster; Gatica; Renis | 4:43 |
| 16. | "Let's Talk About Love" | Bryan Adams; Jean-Jacques Goldman; Eliot Kennedy | Foster | 5:12 |
| Total length: | | | | 74:28 |

=== Notes ===
- ^{^a} signifies an assistant producer
- ^{^b} signifies an additional vocal producer
- ^{^c} signifies an additional producer
- ^{^d} signifies a co-producer
- "Amar Haciendo el Amor" was excluded from the US edition.
- "Where Is the Love" was excluded from the Latin American edition.
- "Be the Man" was excluded from the US, Canadian, and Latin American editions.
- "To Love You More" was included on the US and Latin American editions.

== Personnel ==
Credits adapted from AllMusic.

- Christina Abaroa – coordination
- Walter Afanasieff – arranger, composer, drum programming, keyboard programming, multiple instruments, rhythm programming
- Kenny Aronoff – drums
- Michael Baird – drums
- Jeff Balding – engineer
- David Barratt – production coordination
- Trevor Barry – bass
- Bee Gees – group, guest artist, background vocals
- Michael Bigwood – track engineer
- Kenny O. Bobien – background vocals
- George Bodnar – photography
- Doug Boehm – assistant vocal engineer
- Juan Bohorquez – assistant vocal engineer
- Jeff Bova – keyboards
- Stuart Brawley – assistant vocal engineer, mixing assistant, programming
- Chris Brooke – assistant vocal engineer, engineer, mixing assistant
- Alex Brown – background vocals
- Brownstone – group, guest artist, vocals
- Bob Cadway – vocal engineer
- Dana Calitri – background vocals
- Rachelle Cappelly – background vocals
- Emile Charlap – background vocals
- Maria Christensen – background vocals
- Vinnie Colaiuta – drums
- Richard Cottle – Fender Rhodes
- Rupert Coulson – engineer
- Paulinho Da Costa – percussion
- Lynn Davis – background vocals
- Céline Dion – primary artist, vocals, background vocals
- John Doelp – executive producer
- Nathan East – bass
- Felipe Elgueta – engineer, programming, synthesizer
- Leslie Ellis – background vocals
- Paul J. Falcone – assistant vocal engineer
- Manuel de Falla – composer
- Keith Fluitt – background vocals
- Sherree Ford-Payne – background vocals
- David Foster – arranger, composer, keyboards, producer
- Simon Franglen – Synclavier programming
- Mark Fraunfelder – assistant vocal engineer
- Humberto Gatica – mixing, producer, vocal engineer, vocals
- Barry Gibb – composer
- Maurice Gibb – composer
- Robin Gibb – composer
- Jim Gilstrap – backing vocals
- David Gleeson – engineer
- Jean-Jacques Goldman – composer
- Tony González – assistant vocal engineer
- Mark Hagen – assistant engineer
- Taro Hakase – violin
- Troy Halderson – assistant vocal engineer
- Albert Hammond – composer
- Brian Harding – assistant vocal engineer
- Corey Hart – composer, guest artist, keyboards, producer
- Tony Hinnigan – penny whistle
- Ross Hogarth – assistant engineer
- James Horner – composer
- Jean-Marie Horvat – mixing, vocal engineer
- Mark Hudson – composer
- Dann Huff – guitar
- Phillip Ingram – background vocals
- Arthur Jacobson – composer
- Will Jennings – composer
- Skyler Jett – background vocals
- Bashiri Johnson – percussion
- Dennis Johnson – drums
- Richie Jones – arranger, drums, programming
- Eliot Kennedy – composer
- Carole King – composer, guest artist, piano
- Curtis King Jr. – background vocals
- Diana King – composer, guest artist, vocals
- Kryzler & Kompany – arranger, guitar
- Eric Kupper – keyboards
- Michael Landau – guitar, acoustic guitar, electric guitar
- Tyson Leeper – assistant vocal engineer
- Vito Luprano – executive producer
- Billy Mann – composer
- Glen Marchese – assistant vocal engineer
- George Martin – arranger, conductor, producer
- Giles Martin – assistant producer
- Andy Marvel – composer
- Robbie McIntosh – guitar
- Al McKay – guitar
- John Merchant – engineer
- Laura Mercier – make-up
- Junior Miles – composer
- Norman Newell – composer
- Serge Normant – hair stylist
- Konesha Owens – background vocals
- Billy Pace – composer, percussion programming, producer
- Rafael Padilla – percussion
- Pino Palladino – bass
- Dean Parks – guitar
- Luciano Pavarotti – guest artist, performer, primary artist
- Paul Picard – percussion
- John Pellowe – engineer
- Shawn Pelton – drums
- Leon Pendarvis – string arrangements
- John Pierce – bass
- Tim Pierce – guitar, acoustic guitar
- Steve Porcaro – guest artist, programming, synthesizer
- Sylvain Quesnel – guitar
- Dave Reitzas – engineer
- Tony Renis – arranger, composer, producer
- Denise Rich – composer
- Nicki Richards – background vocals
- Claytoven Richardson – background vocals
- Earl Robinson – background vocals
- Alejandro Rodríguez – engineer
- Arnie Roman – composer
- William Ross – arranger, composer, string arrangements
- Dimo Safari – photography
- Carole Bayer Sager – composer
- Tsuneyoshi Saito – synthesizer
- Dave Scheuer – assistant engineer, track engineer
- Al Schmitt – engineer
- Ethan Schofer – assistant vocal engineer
- Mark Schulman – guitar
- Danny Sembello – composer
- Tina Shafer – composer
- Marti Sharron – composer
- Dan Shea – drum programming, keyboards, programming, rhythm programming, sound design, synthesizer
- Dorian Sherwood – background vocals
- David Spinozza – guitar
- Ramón Stagnaro – acoustic guitar
- Jim Steinman – engineer, producer
- Eddie Stockley – background vocals
- Barbra Streisand – guest artist, performer, primary artist
- Aya Takemura – assistant vocal engineer
- Yoshinobu Takeshita – bass, programming
- Fabio Testa – composer
- Ian Thomas – drums
- Vaneese Thomas – background vocals
- Greg Thompson – assistant vocal engineer
- Michael Thompson – electric guitar, photography
- Linda Thompson-Jenner – composer
- Jeanie Tracy – background vocals
- Eric Troyer – background vocals
- Ric Wake – arranger, producer
- Greg Wells – composer
- Audrey Wheeler – background vocals
- Thomas R. Yezzi – track engineer
- Scott Young – assistant vocal engineer
- Joe Zee – stylist
- Peter Zizzo – arranger, composer, drum programming, guitar, keyboards, background vocals

== Charts ==
=== Weekly charts ===
Weekly chart performance
| Chart (1997–1998) | Peak position |
|---|---|
| Australian Albums (ARIA) | 1 |
| Austrian Albums (Ö3 Austria) | 1 |
| Belgian Albums (Ultratop Flanders) | 1 |
| Belgian Albums (Ultratop Wallonia) | 1 |
| Canada Top Albums/CDs (RPM) | 1 |
| Canadian Albums (Billboard) | 1 |
| Czech Albums (ČNS IFPI) | 5 |
| Danish Albums (Hitlisten) | 1 |
| Dutch Albums (Album Top 100) | 1 |
| European Albums (Music & Media) | 1 |
| Finnish Albums (Suomen virallinen lista) | 1 |
| French Albums (SNEP) | 1 |
| German Albums (Offizielle Top 100) | 1 |
| Greek Albums (IFPI) | 1 |
| Hungarian Albums (MAHASZ) | 3 |
| Icelandic Albums (Tónlist) | 1 |
| Irish Albums (IRMA) | 1 |
| Italian Albums (FIMI) | 1 |
| Japanese Albums (Oricon) | 5 |
| Malaysian Albums (RIM) | 1 |
| New Zealand Albums (RMNZ) | 1 |
| Norwegian Albums (VG-lista) | 1 |
| Portuguese Albums (AFP) | 3 |
| Quebec (ADISQ) | 1 |
| Scottish Albums (Official Charts) | 1 |
| Singaporean Albums (SPVA) | 1 |
| Spanish Albums (PROMUSICAE) | 3 |
| Swedish Albums (Sverigetopplistan) | 1 |
| Swiss Albums (Schweizer Hitparade) | 1 |
| UK Albums (Official Charts) | 1 |
| US Billboard 200 | 1 |

=== Monthly charts ===
Monthly chart performance
| Chart (1998) | Peak position |
|---|---|
| South Korean Albums (RIAK) | 4 |

=== Year-end charts ===
1997 year-end chart performance
| Chart (1997) | Position |
|---|---|
| Australian Albums (ARIA) | 5 |
| Belgian Albums (Ultratop Flanders) | 5 |
| Belgian Albums (Ultratop Wallonia) | 4 |
| Canadian Albums (SoundScan) | 1 |
| Danish Albums (Hitlisten) | 21 |
| Dutch Albums (Album Top 100) | 33 |
| European Albums (Music & Media) | 51 |
| French Albums (SNEP) | 8 |
| German Albums (Offizielle Top 100) | 87 |
| New Zealand Albums (RMNZ) | 50 |
| Norwegian Albums (VG-lista) | 2 |
| Spanish Albums (PROMUSICAE) | 33 |
| Swedish Albums (Sverigetopplistan) | 57 |
| UK Albums (OCC) | 7 |

1998 year-end chart performance
| Chart (1998) | Position |
|---|---|
| Australian Albums (ARIA) | 11 |
| Austrian Albums (Ö3 Austria) | 4 |
| Belgian Albums (Ultratop Flanders) | 6 |
| Belgian Albums (Ultratop Wallonia) | 7 |
| Canada Top Albums/CDs (RPM) | 6 |
| Canadian Albums (Billboard) | 5 |
| Canadian Albums (SoundScan) | 5 |
| Danish Albums (Hitlisten) | 2 |
| Dutch Albums (Album Top 100) | 2 |
| European Albums (Music & Media) | 1 |
| French Albums (SNEP) | 9 |
| German Albums (Offizielle Top 100) | 2 |
| Japanese Albums (Oricon) | 28 |
| New Zealand Albums (RMNZ) | 3 |
| Norwegian Winter Period Albums (VG-lista) | 1 |
| Spanish Albums (PROMUSICAE) | 13 |
| Swedish Albums (Sverigetopplistan) | 5 |
| Swiss Albums (Schweizer Hitparade) | 1 |
| UK Albums (OCC) | 8 |
| US Billboard 200 | 2 |

1999 year-end chart performance
| Chart (1999) | Position |
|---|---|
| UK Albums (OCC) | 128 |
| US Billboard 200 | 101 |

2000 year-end chart performance
| Chart (2000) | Position |
|---|---|
| Finnish Foreign Albums (Suomen virallinen lista) | 8 |

=== Decade-end charts ===
Decade-end chart performance
| Chart (1990–1999) | Position |
|---|---|
| Austrian Albums (Ö3 Austria) | 24 |
| US Billboard 200 | 11 |

=== All-time charts ===
All-time chart performance
| Chart | Position |
|---|---|
| Canadian Albums (SoundScan) | 2 |
| Irish Albums Female Artists (OCC) | 20 |
| UK Albums (OCC) | 62 |
| UK Albums (Females) (OCC) | 20 |
| US Billboard 200 | 164 |
| US Billboard 200 (Women) | 45 |

== Certifications and sales ==
Certifications
| Region | Certification | Certified units/sales |
|---|---|---|
| Argentina (CAPIF) | 2× Platinum | 120,000^{^} |
| Australia (ARIA) | 7× Platinum | 490,000^{‡} |
| Austria (IFPI Austria) | 2× Platinum | 100,000^{*} |
| Belgium (BRMA) | 4× Platinum | 200,000^{*} |
| Brazil | — | 500,000 |
| Canada (Music Canada) | Diamond | 1,700,000 |
| Denmark (IFPI Danmark) | 11× Platinum | 220,000^{‡} |
| Finland (Musiikkituottajat) | 2× Platinum | 97,744 |
| France (SNEP) | Diamond | 1,000,000^{*} |
| Germany (BVMI) | 3× Platinum | 1,500,000^{^} |
| Hong Kong (IFPI Hong Kong) | 2× Platinum | 200,000 |
| Japan (RIAJ) | Million | 1,000,000^{^} |
| Netherlands (NVPI) | 5× Platinum | 500,000^{^} |
| New Zealand (RMNZ) | 9× Platinum | 135,000^{^} |
| Norway (IFPI Norway) | 4× Platinum | 200,000^{*} |
| Poland (ZPAV) | 2× Platinum | 200,000^{*} |
| South Korea | — | 146,679 |
| Spain (Promusicae) | 4× Platinum | 400,000^{^} |
| Sweden (GLF) | 3× Platinum | 240,000^{^} |
| Switzerland (IFPI Switzerland) | 6× Platinum | 300,000^{^} |
| Taiwan (RIT) | — | 500,000 |
| United Kingdom (BPI) | 6× Platinum | 2,000,000 |
| United States (RIAA) | 11× Platinum | 11,000,000^{‡} |
| Uruguay (CUD) | Gold | 3,000^{^} |
Summaries
| Europe (IFPI) | 10× Platinum | 10,000,000^{*} |
| Latin America | — | 2,000,000 |
| Worldwide | — | 31,000,000 |
^{*} Sales figures based on certification alone.^{^} Shipments figures based on certification alone.^{‡} Sales+streaming figures based on certification alone.

== Release history ==
Release history
| Region | Date | Label | Format | Catalog |
|---|---|---|---|---|
| Australia | 14 November 1997 | Epic | CD; cassette | 489159 2 |
| Japan | 15 November 1997 | SMEJ | CD | ESCA-6877 |
| Europe | 17 November 1997 | Columbia | CD; cassette | 34586 8 |
| United States | 18 November 1997 | Epic | CD; cassette | 68861 |
| Canada | 18 November 1997 | Columbia | CD; cassette | CK 68861 |
| Japan | 30 May 2018 | SMEJ | Blu‑spec CD2 | SICP-31168 |
| Worldwide | 24 August 2018 | Columbia | LP | 1 90758 63901 7 |

== See also ==
- Juno Award for Album of the Year
- List of best-selling albums
- List of best-selling albums by women
- List of best-selling albums in Canada
- List of best-selling albums in Europe
- List of best-selling albums in France
- List of best-selling albums in Germany
- List of best-selling albums in Japan
- List of best-selling albums in the Netherlands
- List of best-selling albums in Taiwan
- List of best-selling albums in the United States
- List of best-selling albums in the United States of the Nielsen SoundScan era
- List of Billboard 200 number-one albums of 1998
- List of Diamond-certified albums in Canada
- List of European number-one hits of 1997
- List of European number-one hits of 1998
- List of fastest-selling albums
- List of number-one albums from the 1990s (New Zealand)
- List of number-one albums in Australia during the 1990s
- List of number-one albums of 1997 (Canada)
- List of number-one singles of 1998 (France)
- List of top 25 albums for 1997 in Australia
- List of top 25 albums for 1998 in Australia
- List of UK Albums Chart number ones of the 1990s
