= Miles to Go (Before I Sleep) =

Song by Celine Dion

from the album Let's Talk About Love
- Released: 14 November 1997
- Recorded: 1997
- Studio: Sunset Sound (Hollywood); The Hit Factory (New York)
- Genre: Pop
- Length: 4:40
- Label: Columbia; Epic
- Songwriter: Corey Hart
- Producer: Corey Hart

Audio
- "Miles to Go (Before I Sleep)" on YouTube

"Miles to Go (Before I Sleep)" is a song by Canadian singer Celine Dion from her fifteenth studio album, Let's Talk About Love (1997). It was written and produced by Canadian singer-songwriter Corey Hart. Although not released as a single, the song received adult contemporary airplay in Canada, reaching number 17 on the AC chart in November 1998.

== Background and release ==
"Miles to Go (Before I Sleep)" and "Where Is the Love" were written and produced by Corey Hart for Dion's 1997 album, Let's Talk About Love. The title references the closing line of the 1923 poem "Stopping by Woods on a Snowy Evening" by Robert Frost. In the poem, "sleep" symbolizes death, suggesting that there is much to accomplish before life ends. Hart's lyrics apply the phrase metaphorically to love: "every breath I take for love, I could never be wrong, the journey is long, with miles to go before I sleep".

Thanks to "Miles to Go (Before I Sleep)" and "Where Is the Love", Hart received a nomination for the Juno Award for Producer of the Year in 1998. In 1999, he served as the opening act for Dion during the North American leg of her Let's Talk About Love World Tour. Hart later wrote "Prayer" for Dion's 2002 album, A New Day Has Come.

== Commercial performance ==
Although not issued as a single, "Miles to Go (Before I Sleep)" entered the Canadian Adult Contemporary chart on 28 September 1998 and peaked at number 17 in November 1998. It also placed at number 81 on the 1998 Year-End Adult Contemporary chart.

== Charts ==
=== Weekly charts ===
Weekly chart performance
Chart (1998)	Peak position
Canada Adult Contemporary (RPM)	17

=== Year-end charts ===
Year-end chart performance
Chart (1998)	Position
Canada Adult Contemporary (RPM)	81
