= Tina Shafer =

American singer-songwriter

Tina Shafer is a multi-platinum singer-songwriter and vocal coach who has penned songs for such artists as Celine Dion, Sheena Easton, Phoebe Snow, Billy Porter, and Anna Vissi. Her song "Love is On the Way" was the center piece song in Bette Midler's film The First Wives Club. She has opened for Suzanne Vega, and performed with John Oates, Marc Cohn, Phoebe Snow, Jesse Harris, Vanessa Carlton, Chris Barron (the Spin Doctors) and Eric Bazilian from "The Hooters".

She is the co-founder of The New York Songwriters Circle, one of the most established and long-running showcases in the country, dated from 1991. The Songwriters Circle has been the platform for artists including Grammy-winner Jesse Harris, Norah Jones, Lana Del Rey, Taylor Swift, Big and Rich, John Oates, Marc Cohn, Gavin DeGraw, and Phoebe Snow, Chris Barron. It has its showcases monthly at The Bitter End in New York City.

Most recently, Ms. Shafer appeared not as a performer but as a guest blogger for American Songwriter.

Tina Shafer was recently picked by ABC News host Sandy Kenyon as a top mentor to young talent, both as a performer and Vocal Coach) http://7ny.tv/2vkqX8p

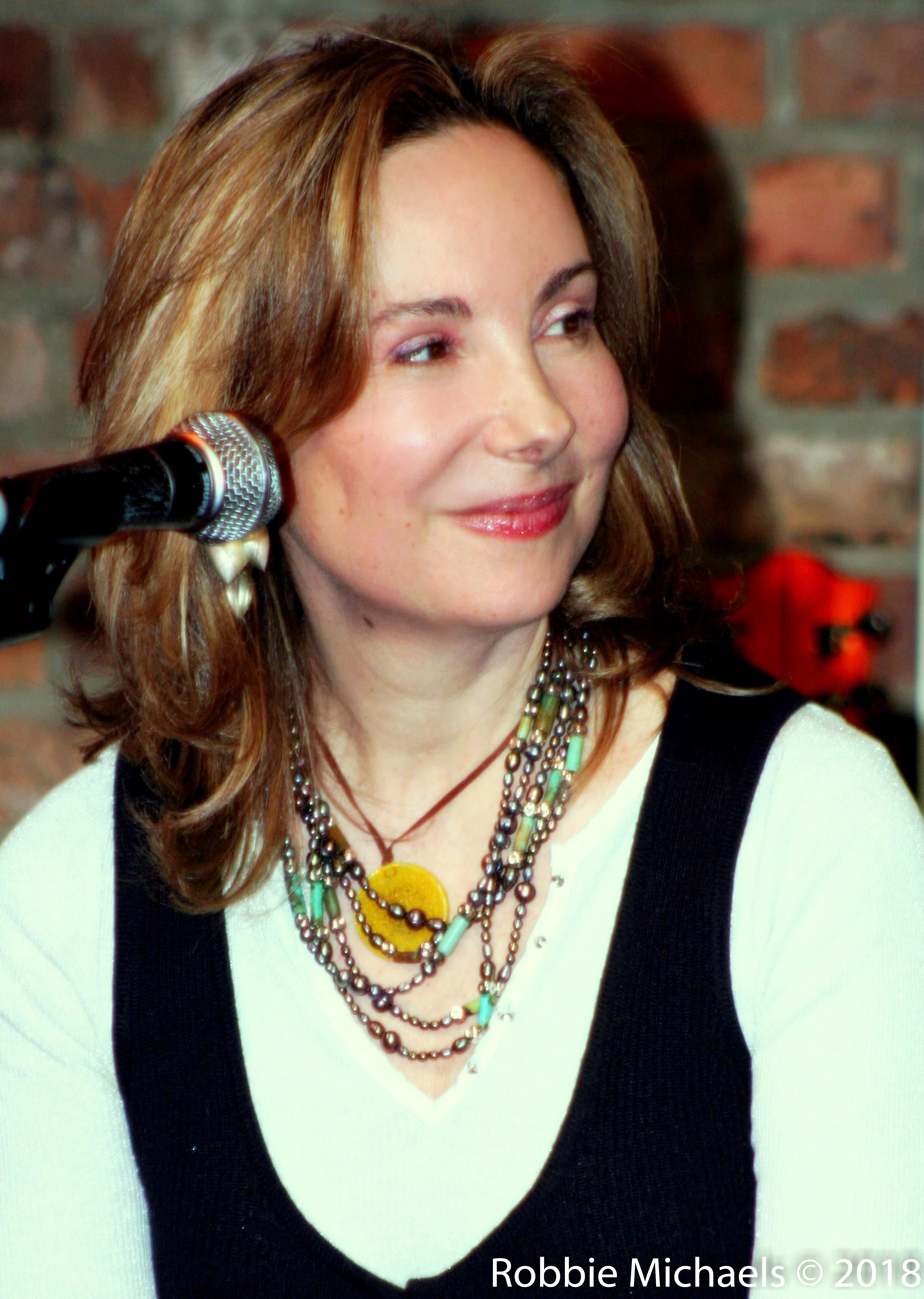
Photo of Tina Shafer taken by photographer Robbie Michaels.

In 2022 Tina's song "Love is on the Way" was used at the Kennedy Awards, honoring Better Midler and sung by Billy Porter.

PBS recently ran a short special on Tina's work hosted by Neil Rosen. https://www.youtube.com/watch?v=1y13vX1eoDI
