= The Colour of My Love Concert =

Video by Celine Dion
- Released: 19 October 1995
- Recorded: 7–8 September 1993
- Venue: Capitole de Québec (Quebec City)
- Genre: Pop
- Length: 71:00
- Languages: English; French
- Labels: Columbia; Epic
- Director: Tony Greco
- Producer: Carol Reynolds

Celine Dion chronology
Unison (1991)	The Colour of My Love Concert (1995)	Live à Paris (1996)

Professional ratings
Review scores
Source	Rating
AllMusic	3/5 stars

The Colour of My Love Concert is the second home video by Canadian singer Celine Dion, released on VHS on 19 October 1995 and on DVD on 6 January 1998 by Columbia Records and Epic Records. It was filmed on 7–8 September 1993 at the Capitole de Québec in Quebec City and first aired in December 1993 on CTV in Canada and in February 1994 on the Disney Channel in the United States.

The program presents songs from Dion's early English-language albums, including material from The Colour of My Love, and includes appearances by Peabo Bryson and Clive Griffin. The home video achieved strong commercial results, reaching the top three on music video charts in the United Kingdom and Australia, and earning platinum certifications in the United States, United Kingdom, and France. It also received several nominations at the Gemini Awards.

== Content ==
The Colour of My Love Concert was recorded on 7–8 September 1993 at the Capitole de Québec and includes songs from Dion's first three English-language albums, with numerous selections from The Colour of My Love. Peabo Bryson and Clive Griffin join Dion for performances of "Beauty and the Beast" and "When I Fall in Love". The setlist also includes several of her major international hits, such as "The Power of Love", "Think Twice", and a rendition of "Can't Help Falling in Love". In Europe, the VHS release added the music video for "Pour que tu m'aimes encore" as a bonus.

== Commercial performance ==
The home video performed well in markets where it was released. In the United States, it spent 39 weeks on the Billboard Top Music Video chart, peaking at number 19. It was certified platinum by the RIAA for shipments of 100,000 copies. The release also received platinum certifications in the United Kingdom and France. In both the UK and Australia, The Colour of My Love Concert reached number three on their respective music video charts.

== Accolades ==
The concert and its broadcast received several nominations at the Gemini Awards, including Best Performance in a Variety Program or Series for Dion, as well as nominations for Best Music, Variety Program or Series and Best Photography in a Comedy, Variety, Performing Arts Program or Series.

== Track listing ==
Standard edition
No.	Title	Writer(s)	Length
1.	"Beauty and the Beast" (intro instrumental)	Alan Menken
2.	"Everybody's Talkin' My Baby Down"	Arnie Roman; Russ DeSalvo
3.	"Love Can Move Mountains"	Diane Warren
4.	"If You Asked Me To"	Warren
5.	"Only One Road"	Peter Zizzo
6.	"Ce n'était qu'un rêve"	Thérèse Dion; Celine Dion; Jacques Dion
7.	"Misled"	Zizzo; Jimmy Bralower
8.	"Think Twice"	Andy Hill; Peter Sinfield
9.	"Where Does My Heart Beat Now"	Robert White Johnson; Taylor Rhodes
10.	"When I Fall in Love" (with Clive Griffin)	Edward Heyman; Victor Young
11.	"Refuse to Dance"	Charlie Dore; Danny Schogger
12.	"The Power of Love"	Gunther Mende; Candy DeRouge; Jennifer Rush; Mary Susan Applegate
13.	"Beauty and the Beast" (with Peabo Bryson)	Menken; Howard Ashman
14.	"Can't Help Falling in Love"	Hugo Peretti; Luigi Creatore; George David Weiss
15.	"The Colour of My Love"	David Foster; Arthur Janov
16.	"The Colour of My Love" (outro instrumental)	Foster

Non-US VHS bonus video
No.	Title	Writer(s)	Director(s)	Length
17.	"Pour que tu m'aimes encore" (music video)	Jean-Jacques Goldman	Michel Meyer

== Charts ==
=== Weekly charts ===
Weekly video chart performance
DVD chart (1995–2004)	Peak position
Australian Music DVD (ARIA)	3
Dutch Music DVD (MegaCharts)	9
Portuguese Music DVD (AFP)	10
UK Music Videos (Official Charts)	3
US Music Video Sales (Billboard)	19

Weekly album chart performance
Album chart (2010)	Peak position
Australian Catalogue Albums (ARIA) CD/DVD edition	8

=== Year-end charts ===
Year-end video chart performance
Chart (2004)	Position
Dutch Music DVD (MegaCharts)	50

== Certifications ==
Certifications
Region	Certification	Certified units/sales
France (SNEP)	Platinum	20,000^{*}
United Kingdom (BPI)	Platinum	50,000^{^}
United States (RIAA)	Platinum	100,000^{^}
^{*} Sales figures based on certification alone.^{^} Shipments figures based on certification alone.

== Release history ==
Release history
Region	Date	Label	Format	Catalog
Australia	19 October 1995	Epic	VHS	200642
Europe	19 October 1995	Columbia	VHS	200642
United States	14 November 1995	Epic	VHS	50136
United States	14 November 1995	Epic	LD	MLV50136
Canada	12 December 1995	Columbia	VHS	
Asia	1995	Columbia	VSD	MVCD50136
Japan	21 March 1996	Epic	VHS	ESVU-144
United States	6 January 1998	Epic	DVD	50136
Canada	10 February 1998	Columbia	DVD	
Europe	24 August 1998	Columbia	DVD	2006429
