= The Colour of My Love Tour =

1994–1995 concert tour by Celine Dion

- Tour by Celine Dion
- Cover of the tour program
- Location: North America; Europe; Japan
- Associated album: The Colour of My Love
- Start date: 11 February 1994
- End date: 27 May 1995
- No. of shows: 63

Celine Dion concert chronology
- Celine Dion in Concert (1992–1993); The Colour of My Love Tour (1994–1995); D'eux Tour (1995–1996)

The Colour of My Love Tour was the sixth concert tour by Canadian singer Celine Dion. It was launched in support of her third English‑language studio album, The Colour of My Love (1993). The tour included performances in North America, Europe, and Asia, where Dion presented songs from the album alongside material from her earlier releases.

== History ==
Dion's first headlining tour in the United States brought her to 10 cities, from San Francisco to New York, in early 1994. Reviewing the final New York performance for New York Newsday, Elisabeth Vincentelli observed that Dion appeared increasingly confident performing in English: "Ad-libbing between songs, Dion managed to seem down-to-earth and accessible. Whether this was consummate manipulation or spontaneous joy, she pulled it off with gusto and humor".

Her concerts at the Montreal Forum in late March 1994 ranked on Pollstar's year-end chart of the Top 200 Concert Grosses, earning $1,002,003.

The set list drew primarily from The Colour of My Love and Dion's earlier English-language albums. It also included several French-language selections and a number of covers, such as "Calling You", "River Deep, Mountain High", and "Can't Help Falling in Love".

From 8 June to 27 August 1994, Dion joined Michael Bolton on his "The One Thing Tour" across the United States. They performed in large arenas and outdoor amphitheaters, marking their second consecutive sold-out tour together.

== Set list ==
The following set list is taken from the US leg of the tour and does not represent all concerts.

1. "Where Does My Heart Beat Now"
2. "Everybody's Talkin' My Baby Down"
3. "If You Asked Me To"
4. "Only One Road"
5. "Beauty and the Beast"
6. "Misled"
7. "L'amour existe encore"
8. "Water from the Moon"
9. "Unison"
10. "When I Fall in Love"
11. "Think Twice"
12. "Love Can Move Mountains"
13. "The Colour of My Love"
14. "The Power of Love"
15. "Can't Help Falling in Love"

=== Notes ===
- In French‑speaking countries, Dion also performed selections from her French‑language repertoire.
- During the later part of the tour, Dion added renditions of "River Deep, Mountain High" and "Calling You".
- At the concerts held on 27–29 September 1994 at the Olympia in Paris, Dion focused primarily on material from Dion chante Plamondon.

== Tour dates ==
List of 1994 concerts
Date (1994)	City	Country	Venue	Opening act(s)	Attendance	Revenue
11 February	San Francisco	United States	Palace of Fine Arts	—N/a	—N/a	—N/a
14 February	Los Angeles	United States	Wadsworth Theatre	—N/a	—N/a	—N/a
17 February	Atlanta	United States	Roxy Theatre	—N/a	—N/a	—N/a
18 February	Miami	United States	Gusman Theater	—N/a	—N/a	—N/a
20 February	Chicago	United States	Park West	—N/a	—N/a	—N/a
21 February	Saint Paul	United States	World Theatre	—N/a	—N/a	—N/a
23 February	Cleveland	United States	Little Theatre	—N/a	—N/a	—N/a
24 February	Washington, D.C.	United States	Lisner Auditorium	—N/a	1,385 / 1,385	$31,163
27 February	Boston	United States	Berklee Performance Center	Paul Wayne	1,058 / 1,058	$21,967
28 February	New York City	United States	The Town Hall	—N/a	1,324 / 1,324	$36,984
5 March	Toronto	Canada	Massey Hall	—N/a	—N/a	—N/a
6 March	Toronto	Canada	Massey Hall	—N/a	—N/a	—N/a
7 March	Toronto	Canada	Massey Hall	—N/a	—N/a	—N/a
12 March	Sydney	Canada	Centre 200	The Barra MacNeils	3,920 / 4,500	$81,148
14 March	Halifax	Canada	Halifax Metro Centre	The Barra MacNeils	5,754 / 6,000	$121,715
15 March	Saint John	Canada	Harbour Station	The Barra MacNeils	5,810 / 6,000	$127,783
17 March	Moncton	Canada	Moncton Coliseum	The Barra MacNeils	4,249 / 5,656	$94,455
25 March	Montreal	Canada	Montreal Forum	Kathleen; Marc Dupré	33,866 / 35,340	$1,002,003
26 March	Montreal	Canada	Montreal Forum	Kathleen; Marc Dupré	33,866 / 35,340	$1,002,003
27 March	Montreal	Canada	Montreal Forum	Kathleen; Marc Dupré	33,866 / 35,340	$1,002,003
29 March	Montreal	Canada	Montreal Forum	Kathleen; Marc Dupré	33,866 / 35,340	$1,002,003
30 March	Montreal	Canada	Montreal Forum	Kathleen; Marc Dupré	33,866 / 35,340	$1,002,003
31 March	Montreal	Canada	Montreal Forum	Kathleen; Marc Dupré	33,866 / 35,340	$1,002,003
4 April	London	Canada	Alumni Hall	—N/a	5,880 / 5,880	$111,563
5 April	London	Canada	Alumni Hall	—N/a	5,880 / 5,880	$111,563
7 April	Hamilton	Canada	Copps Coliseum	—N/a	—N/a	—N/a
9 April	Quebec City	Canada	Colisée de Québec	Marc Dupré	6,143 / 8,114	$138,286
6 May	Vancouver	Canada	Queen Elizabeth Theatre	Anthony Kavanagh	7,342 / 8,793	$219,991
7 May	Vancouver	Canada	Queen Elizabeth Theatre	Anthony Kavanagh	7,342 / 8,793	$219,991
8 May	Vancouver	Canada	Queen Elizabeth Theatre	Anthony Kavanagh	7,342 / 8,793	$219,991
11 May	Calgary	Canada	Southern Alberta Jubilee Auditorium	Anthony Kavanagh	4,342 / 5,404	$129,449
12 May	Calgary	Canada	Southern Alberta Jubilee Auditorium	Anthony Kavanagh	4,342 / 5,404	$129,449
14 May	Edmonton	Canada	Northlands Coliseum	Anthony Kavanagh	6,082 / 8,477	$150,595
17 May	Saskatoon	Canada	Saskatchewan Place	Anthony Kavanagh	3,510 / 5,289	$83,860
18 May	Regina	Canada	Saskatchewan Centre of the Arts	Anthony Kavanagh	1,829 / 2,029	$51,398
20 May	Winnipeg	Canada	Winnipeg Arena	Anthony Kavanagh	6,882 / 7,253	$174,009
22 May	Sudbury	Canada	Sudbury Community Arena	Anthony Kavanagh	4,027 / 4,027	$96,211
24 May	Toronto	Canada	O'Keefe Centre	Anthony Kavanagh	4,705 / 4,705	$134,655
25 May	Toronto	Canada	O'Keefe Centre	Anthony Kavanagh	4,705 / 4,705	$134,655
27 May	Ottawa	Canada	National Arts Centre	Anthony Kavanagh	6,115 / 6,558	$176,554
28 May	Ottawa	Canada	National Arts Centre	Anthony Kavanagh	6,115 / 6,558	$176,554
29 May	Ottawa	Canada	National Arts Centre	Anthony Kavanagh	6,115 / 6,558	$176,554
31 May (Note: The 31 May 1994 concert in Kitchener was originally scheduled for 3 March but was postponed due to illness.)	Kitchener	Canada	Centre In The Square	Anthony Kavanagh	1,708 / 1,708	$50,443
26 August (Note: The 26 August 1994 concert in Ottawa, originally set for 22 August, was part of the Central Canada Exposition.)	Ottawa	Canada	Frank Clair Stadium	Mario Pelchat	7,034 / 15,000	$179,609
27 September	Paris	France	L'Olympia	Marc Dupré	—N/a	—N/a
28 September	Paris	France	L'Olympia	Marc Dupré	—N/a	—N/a
29 September	Paris	France	L'Olympia	Marc Dupré	—N/a	—N/a
4 October	London	England	Cambridge Theatre	Martyn Joseph	—N/a	—N/a
12 October	Montreux	Switzerland	Auditorium Stravinski	—N/a	—N/a	—N/a
24 November	Montreal	Canada	Montreal Forum	Marc Dupré	16,073 / 17,670	$486,949
25 November	Montreal	Canada	Montreal Forum	Marc Dupré	16,073 / 17,670	$486,949
26 November	Montreal	Canada	Montreal Forum	Marc Dupré	16,073 / 17,670	$486,949
5 December	Tokyo	Japan	Nakano Sunplaza	—N/a	—N/a	—N/a
6 December	Tokyo	Japan	Nakano Sunplaza	—N/a	—N/a	—N/a
8 December	Nagoya	Japan	Club Quattro	—N/a	—N/a	—N/a
9 December	Osaka	Japan	Arukaikku Hall	—N/a	—N/a	—N/a
10 December	Tokyo	Japan	Shibuya Public Hall	—N/a	—N/a	—N/a

List of 1995 concerts
Date (1995)	City	Country	Venue
19 February (Note: The 19 February 1995 concert in West Palm Beach supported the non-profit organization Ballet Florida.)	West Palm Beach	United States	West Palm Beach Auditorium
19 May	Birmingham	England	Symphony Hall
20 May	Nottingham	England	Nottingham Royal Concert Hall
22 May	Glasgow	Scotland	Glasgow Royal Concert Hall
23 May	Manchester	England	Manchester Apollo
25 May	London	England	Hammersmith Apollo
27 May	The Hague	Netherlands	Nederlands Congres Centrum

== Broadcasts and recordings ==
Before the tour began, the concerts held on 7–8 September 1993 at the Capitole de Québec in Quebec City were filmed and later broadcast on CTV in December 1993 and on the Disney Channel in February 1994. Conceived, staged, and directed by Tony Greco, the performances were subsequently released as the home video The Colour of My Love Concert.

In September 1994, during a series of sold-out shows at the Paris Olympia in France, Dion recorded a live album. It was released later that year under the title À l'Olympia.

== Personnel ==
Adapted from The Colour of My Love Tour program.

- Celine Dion – lead vocals

=== Band ===
- Claude "Mego" Lemay – musical director
- Dominique Messier – drums
- Jeff Myers – bass
- Yves Frulla – keyboards
- André Coutu – guitars
- Sisandra Myers – backing vocals
- Janice Thompson – backing vocals
- Terry Bradford – backing vocals
- Elise Duguay – backing vocals

=== Production ===
- René Angélil – management
- Tony Greco – tour director
- Lloyd Brault – director of operations
- Ian Donald – production manager
- Sylvia Hebel – tour accountant
- Danis Savage – sound engineer
- Daniel Baron – monitor engineer
- François Desjardins – system engineer
- Yves Aucoin – lighting director
- Normand Chassé – moving light operator
- Jean-François Dubois – equipment manager
- Serge Lacasse – equipment assistant
- Patrick Angélil – tour assistant
- Michel Dion – tour assistant
- Louise Labranche – tour assistant
- Marc Deschamp – chauffeur
- Jacques Riopel – chauffeur
- Eric Burrows – bodyguard
- Louis Hechter – hair
