= The Colour of My Love =

Studio album by Celine Dion
- Released: 9 November 1993
- Recorded: June–September 1993
- Studios: Capitol; Chartmaker; Conway Recording; Cove City Sound (New York); Ground Control; Larrabee Sound; Marian Heights; Ocean Way Recording; Record Plant; The Banana Boat; The Enterprise; The Hit Factory; Westside
- Genre: Pop
- Length: 65:39
- Labels: Columbia; Epic
- Producers: Walter Afanasieff; David Foster; Steve Lindsey; Christopher Neil; Guy Roche; Ric Wake

Celine Dion chronology
Celine Dion (1992)	The Colour of My Love (1993)	À l'Olympia (1994)

Singles from The Colour of My Love
- 1. "When I Fall in Love" Released: June 1993; 2. "The Power of Love" Released: October 1993; 3. "Misled" Released: March 1994; 4. "Think Twice" Released: July 1994; 5. "Only One Road" Released: October 1994; 6. "Next Plane Out" Released: 9 October 1995

The Colour of My Love is the twelfth studio album and third English‑language release by Canadian singer Celine Dion. Issued on 9 November 1993 by Columbia Records and Epic Records, the album marked a step in Dion's move from a rising international vocalist to a widely recognised pop act. Its production was led primarily by David Foster, Ric Wake, Walter Afanasieff, Christopher Neil, and Guy Roche, while four tracks were written by songwriter Diane Warren. The album also includes Dion's recordings of "The Power of Love" and "When I Fall in Love".

Critical reception was generally positive, with reviewers often noting Dion's vocal performance and the album's mix of contemporary pop and ballads. The Colour of My Love became a major commercial success, topping the charts in Canada, Australia, the United Kingdom, and several other European territories, and reaching number four on the Billboard 200 in the United States. With worldwide sales exceeding 20 million copies, the album ranks among the best‑selling albums of all time. It has sold over six million units in the United States, more than 1.8 million in the United Kingdom, 1.5 million in Canada, and upwards of one million in Japan.

The album generated several internationally successful singles. "The Power of Love" became Dion's first number‑one hit in the United States, while "Think Twice" topped the UK Singles Chart for five consecutive weeks and became one of the decade's best‑selling singles in the region. "To Love You More", included on the 1995 Japanese reissue of the album, reached number one in Japan and became one of Dion's most successful singles in the country. Each of these tracks sold more than one million copies in their respective markets.

The Colour of My Love earned Dion multiple awards and industry distinctions. At the Juno Awards of 1995, it won both Album of the Year and Best Selling Album (Foreign or Domestic). It also received the IRMA Award for Best International Female Artist Album. "Think Twice" received the Ivor Novello Award for Best Song Musically and Lyrically, while "To Love You More" won the International Single Grand Prix at the Japan Gold Disc Award. Dion's duet "When I Fall in Love" earned the Grammy Award for Best Instrumental Arrangement Accompanying Vocal(s) and was nominated for the Grammy Award for Best Pop Performance by a Duo or Group with Vocals in 1994. "The Power of Love" was nominated for Grammy Award for Best Female Pop Vocal Performance in 1995.

== Background and release ==
Following the release of her first two English‑language studio albums, Unison (1990) and Celine Dion (1992), and after recording the Academy Award‑ and Grammy Award‑winning duet "Beauty and the Beast", Dion began work on her third English‑language album, The Colour of My Love. By this point, she had already achieved three top‑10 entries on the Billboard Hot 100—"Where Does My Heart Beat Now", "Beauty and the Beast", and "If You Asked Me To"—which helped establish her presence in the North American pop market.

The Colour of My Love was recorded in Los Angeles and mastered in New York City from June to September 1993. In September 1993, Dion performed two concerts at the Capitole de Québec in Quebec City, Canada, recorded for later television broadcast. The shows introduced several previously unheard songs from the forthcoming album, including "Refuse to Dance", "Everybody's Talkin' My Baby Down", "The Colour of My Love", "The Power of Love", "Misled", "Think Twice", and "Only One Road". The performance was later released as the home video The Colour of My Love Concert in 1995.

The Colour of My Love was issued in North America in November 1993, followed by releases in Japan in December 1993, Europe in February 1994, and Australia in March 1994.

The album's liner notes marked the first time Dion publicly acknowledged her romantic relationship with her manager, René Angélil. During the album's launch event at Montreal's Metropolis, she announced that the couple were engaged to be married.

== Content ==
The Colour of My Love was issued with 14 tracks in the United States and 15 in most international markets, where it included the additional song "Just Walk Away". The album's production was led primarily by David Foster, Ric Wake, Guy Roche, Walter Afanasieff, and Christopher Neil, resulting in a polished mix of adult contemporary ballads and mainstream pop. Songwriter Diane Warren contributed four compositions—"Next Plane Out", "Real Emotion", "No Living Without Loving You", and "Lovin' Proof"—which added to the album's focus on melody‑driven material.

The tracklist includes a duet with British singer Clive Griffin on "When I Fall in Love", originally recorded for the soundtrack of Sleepless in Seattle. It also includes Dion's recording of Jennifer Rush's 1984 hit "The Power of Love", which became one of her most widely recognised songs.

In October 1995, The Colour of My Love was reissued in Japan with the addition of "To Love You More", a new track written and produced by David Foster. The song became a major commercial success in Japan and contributed to the album's long‑term popularity in the region.

== Singles ==
Following the success of the duet "When I Fall in Love", originally featured on the Sleepless in Seattle soundtrack, "The Power of Love" was released as the first major single from The Colour of My Love. The song became one of Dion's most commercially successful recordings, reaching number one in the United States, Canada, and Australia, and entering the top 10 in several additional territories, including the United Kingdom and France. With more than 1.1 million copies sold in the United States and a platinum certification in 1994, it is regarded as a key hit of her early English‑language career.

The second single, "Misled", continued the album's strong performance, becoming a top‑ten hit in Canada and reaching number one on the US Hot Dance Club Songs chart. It was followed by "Think Twice", which became one of Dion's most notable international successes. The ballad topped the charts in the United Kingdom, Ireland, Belgium, Denmark, Norway, Sweden, and the Netherlands, and entered the top 10 in Australia, Spain, and Switzerland. With sales exceeding 1.3 million copies in the United Kingdom and a platinum certification in 1995 (later qualifying for double platinum), "Think Twice" became one of the decade's most widely recognised power ballads.

The album's fourth single, "Only One Road", also achieved international success, reaching the top 10 in the United Kingdom, Spain, and Ireland. In 1995, "Next Plane Out" was released as a single in Australia, while "Just Walk Away" was issued as a promotional single in Spain, further extending the album's global reach.

In October 1995, The Colour of My Love was reissued in Japan with the addition of "To Love You More", which was released simultaneously as a single. The song became a major hit, reaching number one on the Oricon Singles Chart and selling approximately 1.5 million copies in Japan. It was certified million by the RIAJ, becoming one of Dion's most successful singles in the Japanese market.

== Promotion ==
Dion promoted The Colour of My Love extensively in North America throughout late 1993 and early 1994, appearing on a range of television programs and award shows. Her concert special, The Colour of My Love Concert, was broadcast in Canada in December 1993 and in the United States in February 1994, helping maintain the album's visibility. She also embarked on The Colour of My Love Tour, performing in the United States in February 1994 and across Canada through May 1994.

Following the international success of "Think Twice", Dion expanded promotional activities to Europe in 1995, including several high‑profile appearances in the United Kingdom. Notable performances during the album's promotional cycle included "The Power of Love" at the Juno Awards of 1994 and the American Music Awards of 1995, "Think Twice" at the Edison Awards in 1994 and the World Music Awards in 1995, and "The Colour of My Love" at the Juno Awards of 1995.

Dion also performed three songs from the album on the United Kingdom's Top of the Pops: "The Power of Love" (1994), "Think Twice" (1995), and "Only One Road" (1995), each aligning with the singles' chart success in the region.

== Critical reception ==
Professional ratings
Review scores
Source	Rating
AllMusic	3/5 stars
The Baltimore Sun	mixed
Billboard (editorial)	positive
Billboard (Larry Flick)	positive
Chicago Tribune	2/4 stars
Music & Media	positive
Music Week	3/5 stars
RPM	positive

Upon release, The Colour of My Love received generally positive attention from music critics, many of whom praised Dion's vocal ability while offering differing views on the album's material and stylistic choices. Stephen Thomas Erlewine of AllMusic awarded the album three out of five stars, writing that it builds on the template of Dion's self‑titled breakthrough. Although he found the songwriting uneven in places, he noted that the album remains effective thanks to its polished production, key ballads—particularly "When I Fall in Love", "The Power of Love", and "Think Twice"—and Dion's expressive performances.

Brad Webber of the Chicago Tribune gave the album two out of four stars, describing several tracks as "sickly sweet, by‑the‑books standards". While he felt some stylistic elements were derivative—such as the "Janet Jackson‑styled" approach of "Misled" and "Think Twice"—he singled out "Refuse to Dance" for its "exotic thrill" and welcomed its distinctive, atmospheric production.

Billboard offered a strongly positive assessment, calling The Colour of My Love a "big‑league affair" positioned to elevate Dion to "new realms of pop stardom". The magazine praised her growing artistic confidence and vocal command, noting "The Power of Love", "Misled", and "Only One Road" as standout tracks. Reviewer Larry Flick wrote that while the album retains the "grand pop balladry" associated with Dion's earlier work, it also adopts greater rhythmic variety, citing the "jack‑swinging" "Misled" and the "haunting but spine‑crawling" "Refuse to Dance" as examples of her expanding stylistic range.

According to Ron Rogers of RPM, the album contains strong commercial potential, with virtually every track considered a chart contender, including "Misled", "Only One Road", and "Think Twice". He also wrote that the album demonstrates Dion's "enormous vocal range", adding that her voice has "never been better".

== Commercial performance ==
The Colour of My Love became one of the world's best‑selling albums of all time, marking a major commercial milestone in Dion's career. It ranked as the second top‑selling album of 1994 in Canada, the third best‑selling album of 1994 by a female artist in the United States, and the third best‑selling album of 1995 in the United Kingdom. With global sales exceeding 20 million copies, it stands among the twenty best‑selling albums by a female artist in history.

=== Canada ===
In Canada, The Colour of My Love debuted at number five on the RPM Albums Chart and rose to number one in its fifth week. It remained at the summit for 12 consecutive weeks and spent 80 weeks on the chart. In December 1994, the album was certified diamond by the CRIA for shipments of one million copies. It finished 1994 as the country's second best‑selling album, behind Ace of Base's The Sign. By the end of 1995, Billboard reported worldwide sales of 10 million copies, including 1.4 million in Canada. In November 1996, Billboard noted that Canadian sales had reached 1.5 million units. The album also topped the Quebec chart for 20 weeks.

=== United States ===
In the United States, The Colour of My Love debuted at number 88 on the Billboard 200 with first‑week sales of 16,000 copies. It peaked at number four in March 1994 and spent 149 weeks on the chart. It became the 20th best‑selling album of 1994 (and the third best‑selling by a female artist), with 2.1 million copies sold that year. According to Nielsen SoundScan, the album has sold 4.6 million copies, and in November 1999 it was certified six times platinum by the RIAA for shipments of six million units.

=== Europe ===
In the United Kingdom, the album debuted at number 10 in March 1994. Following the success of "Think Twice", it reached number one in January 1995 and spent seven weeks at the top. For five consecutive weeks, both The Colour of My Love and "Think Twice" topped the UK album and singles charts—an achievement not seen since 1965 during the peak of The Beatles. In December 1995, the album was certified five times platinum by the BPI for sales of 1.5 million copies. It finished 1995 as the UK's third best‑selling album, behind Robson & Jerome and (What's the Story) Morning Glory? by Oasis. In 2006, the Official Charts Company listed it as the 77th best‑selling album in UK history, with 1,816,915 copies sold (eligible for six times platinum certification).

Across Europe, the album reached number one in Ireland, Norway, Belgium's Flanders, and Denmark, and entered the top 10 in France, Spain, Switzerland, Sweden, Finland, Portugal, and the Netherlands. It received multi‑platinum, platinum, and gold certifications across the continent. In 1996, the IFPI awarded it four times platinum for sales of four million copies in Europe.

=== Japan ===
In Japan, the album originally peaked at number 65 in February 1994 and was certified gold for sales of 200,000 units. Following the success of "To Love You More", The Colour of My Love was reissued in October 1995 and climbed to number seven on the Oricon Albums Chart. The reissue sold 650,000 copies in 1995 alone, and a combined 813,450 copies while charting in 1995–1996. In January 1996, it was certified three times platinum by the RIAJ, and later that year became Dion's first million‑selling album in Japan when combining sales of both editions. As of May 1996, the album had sold more than 1.5 million copies across Southeast Asia.

=== Australia ===
In Australia, the album debuted at number nine in March 1994. Boosted by the success of "Think Twice", it reached number one in mid‑1995 and spent eight weeks at the top—the longest run for any album that year. It became the second best‑selling album of 1995 in Australia, behind Tina Arena's Don't Ask. The Colour of My Love was certified nine times platinum by the ARIA for shipments of 630,000 copies. With worldwide sales of approximately 20 million copies, it remains one of Dion's most commercially successful albums.

== Accolades ==
The Colour of My Love earned a wide range of awards and nominations, reflecting both its commercial success and the international reach of its singles. At the Juno Awards of 1995, the album won Album of the Year and Best Selling Album (Foreign or Domestic). Internationally, it received the IRMA Award for Best International Female Artist Album in 1996 and was nominated for the Edison Award for Best Album in 1995.

Several singles from the album also received major international recognition. "Think Twice" won the Ivor Novello Award for Best Song Musically and Lyrically, while "To Love You More" earned the International Single Grand Prix at the Japan Gold Disc Award.

The duet "When I Fall in Love" received the Grammy Award for Best Instrumental Arrangement Accompanying Vocal(s) and was nominated for the Grammy Award for Best Pop Performance by a Duo or Group with Vocals. It also received two ASCAP Pop Awards for Most Performed Songs and a nomination for Best Song from a Movie at the MTV Movie Awards.

"The Power of Love" also received significant recognition, earning nominations for the Grammy Award for Best Female Pop Vocal Performance, the American Music Award for Favorite Pop/Rock Single, the Juno Award for Single of the Year, and two Billboard Music Awards (Hot 100 Single of the Year and Adult Contemporary Single of the Year). It also won an ASCAP Pop Award for Most Performed Songs, while "Misled" received a BMI Pop Award in the same category.

The album's success contributed to Dion receiving multiple international honors, including two World Music Awards (Best Selling Canadian Female Artist of the Year and Best Selling Canadian Artist of the Year), the Juno Award for Female Vocalist of the Year, and two Félix Awards (Artist of the Year Achieving the Most Success Outside Quebec and Artist of the Year Achieving the Most Success in a Language Other Than French).

Dion also earned her first nomination for a Brit Award in the category Best International Female, along with additional nominations at the Billboard Music Awards and Juno Awards. The concert special The Colour of My Love Concert also received recognition, earning a nomination for a Gemini Award in 1995.

== Track listing ==
No.	Title	Writer(s)	Producer(s)	Length
1.	"The Power of Love"	Gunther Mende; Candy DeRouge; Jennifer Rush; Mary Susan Applegate	David Foster	5:42
2.	"Misled"	Peter Zizzo; Jimmy Bralower	Ric Wake	3:30
3.	"Think Twice"	Andy Hill; Peter Sinfield	Christopher Neil; Aldo Nova^{[a]}	4:47
4.	"Only One Road"	Zizzo	Wake	4:48
5.	"Everybody's Talkin' My Baby Down"	Arnie Roman; Russ DeSalvo	Wake	4:01
6.	"Next Plane Out"	Diane Warren	Guy Roche	4:57
7.	"Real Emotion"	Warren	Wake	4:26
8.	"When I Fall in Love" (with Clive Griffin)	Edward Heyman; Victor Young	Foster	4:20
9.	"Love Doesn't Ask Why"	Barry Mann; Cynthia Weil; Phil Galdston	Walter Afanasieff	4:08
10.	"Refuse to Dance"	Charlie Dore; Danny Schogger	Neil	4:22
11.	"I Remember L.A."	Tony Colton; Richard Wold	Neil	4:12
12.	"No Living Without Loving You"	Warren	Roche	4:22
13.	"Lovin' Proof"	Warren	Wake	4:11
14.	"Just Walk Away"	Marti Sharron; Albert Hammond	Steve Lindsey; Humberto Gatica^{[a]}	4:58
15.	"The Colour of My Love"	Foster; Arthur Janov	Foster	3:25
Total length:				65:39

=== Notes ===
- ^{^[a]} signifies an additional producer
- The US edition omits "Just Walk Away".
- The 1995 Japanese edition includes the bonus track "To Love You More".

== Personnel ==
Adapted from AllMusic.

- Walter Afanasieff – producer
- Mary Susan Applegate – composer
- John Birchall – hair stylist
- Jimmy Bralower – composer
- Tony Colton – composer
- Candy de Rouge – composer
- Russ DeSalvo – composer
- Celine Dion – vocals
- Phillip Dixon – photography
- John Doelp – executive producer
- Nancy Donald – art direction, design
- Charlie Dore – composer
- Felipe Elgueta – engineer
- Mike Fisher – percussion
- David Foster – keyboards, composer, producer
- Simon Franglen – Synclavier
- Phil Galdston – composer
- Arthur Ganov – composer
- Humberto Gatica – engineer
- Edward Heyman – composer
- Andy Hill – composer
- Skyler Jett – backing vocals
- Vito Luprano – executive producer
- Barry Mann – composer
- Vlado Meller – mastering engineer
- Gunther Mende – composer
- Christopher Neil – producer
- Aldo Nova – producer
- Dean Parks – guitar
- Guy Roche – producer
- Arnie Roman – composer
- Jennifer Rush – composer
- Danny Schogger – composer
- Carol Shaw – make-up
- Peter Sinfield – composer
- Ric Wake – producer
- Stephen Walker – art direction, design
- Diane Warren – composer
- Cynthia Weil – composer
- Richard Wold – composer
- Victor Young – composer
- Peter Zizzo – composer

== Charts ==
=== Weekly charts ===
Weekly chart performance
Chart (1993–1996)	Peak position
Australian Albums (ARIA)	1
Austrian Albums (Ö3 Austria)	18
Belgian Albums (Ultratop Flanders)	1
Belgian Albums (Ultratop Wallonia)	13
Canada Top Albums/CDs (RPM)	1
Canadian Albums (The Record)	1
Danish Albums (Hitlisten)	1
Dutch Albums (Album Top 100)	2
European Albums (Music & Media)	4
Finnish Albums (Suomen virallinen lista)	7
French Albums (SNEP)	7
German Albums (Offizielle Top 100)	16
Irish Albums (IRMA)	1
Italian Albums (Musica e dischi)	11
Japanese Albums (Oricon)	7
New Zealand Albums (RMNZ)	2
Norwegian Albums (VG-lista)	1
Portuguese Albums (AFP)	2
Quebec (ADISQ)	1
Scottish Albums (Official Charts)	1
Spanish Albums (PROMUSICAE)	7
Swedish Albums (Sverigetopplistan)	4
Swiss Albums (Schweizer Hitparade)	9
UK Albums (Official Charts)	1
US Billboard 200	4

=== Year-end charts ===
1993 year-end chart performance
Chart (1993)	Position
Canada Top Albums/CDs (RPM)	43

1994 year-end chart performance
Chart (1994)	Position
Australian Albums (ARIA)	48
Canada Top Albums/CDs (RPM)	2
French Albums (SNEP)	34
New Zealand Albums (RMNZ)	32
US Billboard 200	16

1995 year-end chart performance
Chart (1995)	Position
Australian Albums (ARIA)	2
Belgian Albums (Ultratop Flanders)	3
Belgian Albums (Ultratop Wallonia)	34
Canada Top Albums/CDs (RPM)	67
Dutch Albums (Album Top 100)	8
European Albums (Music & Media)	6
German Albums (Offizielle Top 100)	35
Japanese Albums (Oricon)	98
New Zealand Albums (RMNZ)	6
Norwegian Spring Period Albums (VG-lista)	1
Spanish Albums (PROMUSICAE)	29
Swedish Albums (Sverigetopplistan)	32
Swiss Albums (Schweizer Hitparade)	10
UK Albums (OCC)	3
US Billboard 200	116

1996 year-end chart performance
Chart (1996)	Position
Australian Albums (ARIA)	22
Dutch Albums (Album Top 100)	23
European Albums (Music & Media)	87
Japanese Albums (Oricon)	43
New Zealand Albums (RMNZ)	45
UK Albums (OCC)	55
US Billboard 200	197

=== All-time charts ===
All-time chart performance
Chart	Position
UK Albums (OCC)	77

== Certifications and sales ==
Certifications
Region	Certification	Certified units/sales
Australia (ARIA)	9× Platinum	630,000^{‡}
Austria (IFPI Austria)	Gold	25,000^{*}
Belgium (BRMA)	2× Platinum	100,000^{*}
Canada (Music Canada)	Diamond	1,500,000
Finland (Musiikkituottajat)	Platinum	40,289
France (SNEP)	Platinum	300,000^{*}
Germany (BVMI)	Gold	250,000^{^}
Italy (FIMI)	Gold	50,000^{*}
Japan (RIAJ)	3× Platinum	1,013,450
Netherlands (NVPI)	3× Platinum	300,000^{^}
New Zealand (RMNZ)	6× Platinum	90,000^{^}
Norway (IFPI Norway)	3× Platinum	150,000^{*}
Spain (Promusicae)	Platinum	100,000^{^}
Sweden (GLF)	Platinum	100,000^{^}
Switzerland (IFPI Switzerland)	Platinum	50,000^{^}
Turkey (Mü-Yap)	Gold	20,000
United Kingdom (BPI)	5× Platinum	1,816,915
United States (RIAA)	6× Platinum	6,000,000^{^}
Summaries
Europe (IFPI)	4× Platinum	4,000,000^{*}
Southeast Asia	—	1,500,000
Worldwide	—	20,000,000
^{*} Sales figures based on certification alone.^{^} Shipments figures based on certification alone.^{‡} Sales+streaming figures based on certification alone.

== Release history ==
Release history
Region	Date	Label	Format	Catalog	Edition
Canada	9 November 1993	Columbia	CD; cassette	57555	15 tracks
United States	9 November 1993	550 Music	CD; cassette	57555	14 tracks
Japan	2 December 1993	SMEJ	CD	ESCA-5893	15 tracks
Germany	11 February 1994	Columbia	CD; LP; cassette	474743	15 tracks
Switzerland	14 February 1994	Columbia	CD; LP; cassette	474743	15 tracks
United Kingdom	21 February 1994	Epic	CD; cassette	474743	15 tracks
Australia	7 March 1994	Epic	CD; cassette	474743	15 tracks
United Kingdom	1 August 1994	Epic	MD	4747438	15 tracks
Japan	21 October 1995	SMEJ	CD	ESCA-6340	16 tracks
Japan	30 May 2018	SMEJ	Blu-spec CD2	SICP-31166	15 tracks
Various	9 November 2018	Columbia	LP	589420	15 tracks

== See also ==
- Juno Award for Album of the Year
- Juno Award for International Album of the Year
- List of best-selling albums
- List of best-selling albums by women
- List of Canadian number-one albums of 1993
- List of Canadian number-one albums of 1994
- List of Diamond-certified albums in Canada
- List of number-one albums in Australia during the 1990s
- List of top 25 albums for 1995 in Australia
- List of top 25 albums for 1996 in Australia
- List of UK Albums Chart number ones of the 1990s
