= Happy Ground =

Studio album by Johnny Lytle
- Released: 1961
- Recorded: March 23, 1961; New York City
- Genre: Jazz
- Length: 40:18
- Label: Jazzland; JLP 44

Johnny Lytle chronology
Blue Vibes (1960)	Happy Ground (1961)	Nice and Easy (1961)

Happy Ground is the second album by American jazz vibraphonist Johnny Lytle which was recorded in 1961 for the Jazzland label. The album was later reissued on the Riverside label in 1963.

== Track listing ==
All compositions by Johnny Lytle except as indicated

1. "Lela" – 4:13
2. "Secret Love" (Paul Francis Webster, Sammy Fain) – 6:51
3. "When I Fall In Love" (Edward Heyman, Victor Young) – 4:24
4. "Tag Along" (Clark, Ness) – 3:12
5. "It's All Right with Me" (Cole Porter) – 5:36
6. "Happy Ground" – 7:13
7. "My Funny Valentine" (Richard Rodgers, Lorenz Hart) – 4:12
8. "Take the "A" Train" (Billy Strayhorn) – 2:50

== Personnel ==
- Johnny Lytle – vibraphone
- Milton Harris – organ
- William "Peppy" Hinnant – drums
