= Swingin' at the Gate =

Live album by Johnny Lytle
- Released: 1967
- Recorded: August–November 1967
- Venue: Top of the Gate, New York City
- Genre: Jazz
- Label: Pacific Jazz; PJ-10129
- Producer: Irv Bagley

Johnny Lytle chronology
| Done It Again (1967) | Swingin' at the Gate (1967) | A Man and a Woman (1967) |

Swingin' at the Gate is a live album led by American jazz vibraphonist Johnny Lytle which was recorded in 1967 at the Top of the Gate, an upper-story performance space above The Village Gate, for the Pacific Jazz label.

== Reception ==
Professional ratings
Review scores
| Source | Rating |
|---|---|
| Allmusic | 4/5 stars |

The Allmusic review by Craig Lytle states "Lytle has always made good music, and this outing is enhanced by the admirable rapport he establishes with the audience. This is an excellent piece".

== Track listing ==
All compositions by Johnny Lytle except as indicated

1. "Minor Soul" - 4:47
2. "Gonna Get That Boat" - 5:45
3. "Cherish" (Terry Kirkman) - 5:41
4. "Mongo" - 4:18
5. "Blues Time" - 5:30
6. "Just a Feelin' Good" - 4:25
7. "When I Fall in Love" (Victor Young, Edward Heyman) - 5:12
8. "Jugee Boogie" - 4:31

== Personnel ==
- Johnny Lytle - vibraphone, xylophone, beer bottle, narration
- Jimmy Foster - organ
- Larry Gales - bass
- Jozell Carter - drums
- Carlos "Patato" Valdes - congas
