= The Soulful Rebel =

Studio album by Johnny Lytle
- Released: 1971
- Recorded: July 15, 1971 at Decca Sound Studios in New York City
- Genre: Jazz
- Label: Milestone MSP 9036
- Producer: Orrin Keepnews

Johnny Lytle chronology
Close Enough for Jazz (1969)	The Soulful Rebel (1971)	People & Love (1972)

The Soulful Rebel is an album by vibraphonist Johnny Lytle recorded in 1971 and originally issued on the Milestone label.

== Reception ==
Allmusic gave the album 3 stars.

Professional ratings
Review scores
Source	Rating
Allmusic	3/5 stars

== Track listing ==
All compositions by Johnny Lytle except as indicated

1. "Gunky" - 4:31
2. "The New Village Caller" - 4:48
3. "Didn't We?" (Jimmy Webb) - 3:51
4. "Lela" - 3:43
5. "The Soulful Rebel Suite:"
  1. "The Soulful Rebel" - 4:26
  2. "High Treason" - 3:34
  3. "The Struggle" - 3:35
  4. "Inner Peace" - 4:24
6. "Does Anybody Really Know What Time It Is?" (Robert Lamm) - 4:19

== Personnel ==
- Johnny Lytle - vibraphone
- Billy Nunn - organ, electric piano
- David Spinozza - guitar
- Ron Carter - electric bass
- Josell Carter - drums
- Ray Barretto - congas
