= Johnny Lytle =

American jazz vibraphonist (1932–1995)

John “Johnny” Dillard Lytle (October 13, 1932 in Springfield, Ohio – December 15, 1995 in Springfield) was an American jazz drummer and vibraphonist.

== Life and career ==
Lytle grew up in Springfield, Ohio in a family of musicians, the son of Robert B. Lytle, a trumpeter and Margaret Ann Stripling, an organist. He was also the third born child out of nine. He began playing the drums and piano at an early age. Before studying music in earnest, he was a boxer, and was a successful Golden Gloves champion. During the late '50s, Lytle continued to box, but landed jobs as a drummer for Ray Charles, Jimmy Witherspoon and Gene Ammons. Then he switched from drums to vibraphone and toured with organist Hiram "Boots" Johnson from 1955 to 1957. He formed his first group in 1957 with saxophonist Boots Johnson, organist Milton Harris and drummer William "Peppy" Hinnant. He impressed the producer Orrin Keepnews who signed him to his Jazzland label in 1960.

Lionel Hampton said Lytle was "the greatest vibes player in the world." Lytle was known for his great hand speed and showmanship. He was also a songwriter, penning many of his own hits, including "The Loop", "The Man", "Selim", "Lela", and the jazz classic "The Village Caller". Lytle recorded more than 30 albums for various jazz labels including Jazzland, Pacific Jazz, Solid State, Milestone and Muse. Throughout his career he performed and recorded with jazz greats including Louis Armstrong, Lionel Hampton, Miles Davis, Nancy Wilson, Bobby Timmons and Roy Ayers. Lytle was such an admirer of the music of Miles Davis that he wrote "Selim" (Miles spelled backwards) in honor of Davis. He also featured his son, Marcel Lytle, on several recordings, as a vocalist and drummer.

He found success early in his career with chart-topping albums like A Groove, Moon Child, and The Loop. From his swinging uptempo tracks to his soul-satisfying ballads, Lytle knew how to keep a groove. And with a nickname like "Fast Hands", he could always keep the attention of an audience. In addition to his musicianship, his gregarious personality made him a popular attraction on the jazz circuit. Even though he did not experience the same success he was privileged to during the 1960s, he did continue to record and build a respectable catalog of music with recordings in the '70s, '80s and '90s.

Lytle remained a popular concert attraction in the U.S. and Europe; his last performance was with the Springfield (Ohio) Symphony Orchestra in his hometown on November 18, 1995. Passing away from kidney failure the following month, he was survived by his wife Barbara Jean Lytle (deceased June 14, 2025), his sons Marcel Anthony (deceased Jan 1, 2019) and Michael-Lamont (of Toronto), and his daughter Ayo Michelle Hagans (of Augusta ). At the time of his death, Lytle was scheduled to begin recording a new album on the Muse label. In his hometown of Springfield, Ohio, the street where he used to live was renamed 'Johnny Lytle Avenue' in his honor.

== Discography ==
=== As Leader ===
- Blue Vibes (Jazzland 22, 1960)
- Happy Ground (Jazzland 44, 1961) - reissued on Riverside 470 in 1963.
- Nice and Easy: The Soulful Vibes of Johnny Lytle (Jazzland 67, 1962) - with Johnny Griffin, Bobby Timmons; CD later reissued on OJC/Fantasy in 1999.
- Moon Child (Jazzland 81, 1962) - with Ray Barretto; reissued on Riverside 3017 in 1968; CD later reissued on Milestone in 2001.
- Got That Feeling! (Riverside 456, 1963) - CD later reissued on Milestone in 2001.
- The Village Caller! (Riverside 480, 1963) - reissued as A Groove on Riverside 3003 in 1967; CD later reissued on OJC/Fantasy in 1998.
- The Loop (Tuba 5001, 1966) - CD later reissued on Beat Goes Public/BGP in 1990.
- New and Groovy (Tuba 5002, 1967) - CD later reissued on Beat Goes Public/BGP in 1990.
- Look! Johnny Lytle Done it Again (Pacific Jazz 10125, 1967) - CD later reissued on Get On Down in 2011.
- Swingin' at the Gate [live] (Pacific Jazz 10129, 1967)
- A Man and a Woman (Solid State 18014, 1967)
- The Sound of Velvet Soul (Solid State 18026, 1968)
- Be Proud (Solid State 18044, 1968)
- Close Enough for Jazz (Solid State 18056, 1969)
- The Soulful Rebel (Milestone 9036, 1971) - CD later reissued on Real Gone Music in 2013.
- People & Love (Milestone 9043, 1972) - with Butch Cornell; CD later reissued on Real Gone Music in 2013.
- Everything Must Change (Muse 5158, 1977) - with Big John Patton
- Fast Hands (Muse 5185, 1980) -with Houston Person; later reissued on 32 Jazz in 1998.
- Good Vibes (Muse 5271, 1981) - with Houston Person
- Los Grandes del Jazz (Sarpe [Spain], 1982) - also released as I Giganti Del Jazz, Vol. 93 (Curcio [Italy], 1982).
- Happy Ground (Muse 5387, 1989 [rel. 1991]) - with Houston Person; later reissued on 32 Jazz in 1998.
- Moonchild (Muse 5431, 1991 [rel. 1992]) - with Houston Person
- Possum Grease (Muse 5482, 1992 [rel. 1995]) - with Houston Person

=== As Sideman ===
With Bobby Timmons

- Workin' Out! (Prestige 7387, 1964) - CD later reissued on Prestige in 1994.

With Roger Troutman

- Unlimited! (Reprise, 1987)
