= List of best-selling singles of the 1900s in the United Kingdom =

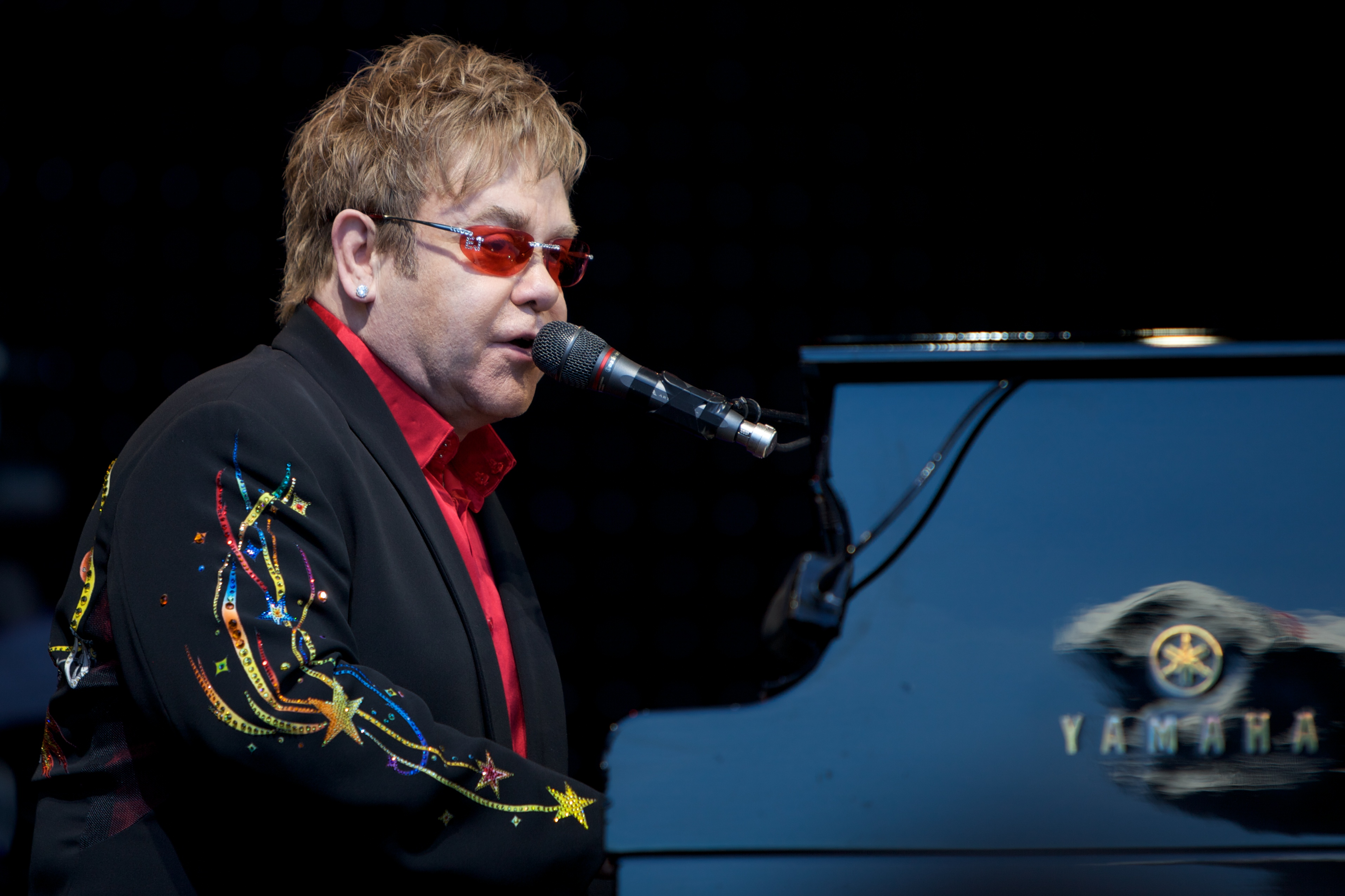
Elton John's "Candle in the Wind 1997" was the best-selling single in the UK during the 20th century.

This is a list based on estimated sales between 1952 (the first charts) and the end of 1999. Availability of sales figures, particularly in earlier decades, means that there is a great deal of uncertainty over the accuracy of these estimates.

Singles are a type of music release defined by the British organisation the Official Charts Company (OCC) as having fewer than four tracks and not lasting longer than 25 minutes. Sales of singles in the United Kingdom have been monitored since 1952, when Percy Dickins of NME contacted a sample of 20 shops to asking what their 10 best-selling singles for that week had been. Dickins compiled the results into a Top 12 hit parade, which eventually became the UK Singles Chart. On 16 November 2002, Channel 4 broadcast a television programme to commemorate the 50th anniversary of the chart, which counted down the biggest-selling singles up to that point. The song at number one was "Candle in the Wind 1997" / "Something About the Way You Look Tonight" by Elton John, a charity single released to commemorate the death of Diana, Princess of Wales. The artist that appeared the most on the chart was The Beatles, who had released five of the biggest-selling singles of the century.

The top 69 entries in this list had sold 1 million copies by the end of 1999, although subsequently "Three Lions" and "3 Lions '98" by Baddiel & Skinner & The Lightning Seeds—which were both certified Platinum—had their sales combined, meaning that most commentators record there as having been 70 million sellers before 2000.

== Singles ==
No.	Artist	Single	Year	Sales
1	Elton John	"Candle in the Wind '97	1997	4,860,000
2	Band Aid	"Do They Know It's Christmas?"	1984	3,550,000
3	Queen	"Bohemian Rhapsody"	1975	2,130,000
4	Wings	"Mull of Kintyre" / "Girls' School"	1977	2,050,000
5	Boney M	"Rivers of Babylon" / "Brown Girl in the Ring"	1978	1,985,000
6	John Travolta & Olivia Newton-John	"You're the One That I Want"	1978	1,975,000
7	Frankie Goes to Hollywood	"Relax"	1983	1,910,000
8	The Beatles	"She Loves You"	1963	1,890,000
9	Robson & Jerome	"Unchained Melody"	1995	1,840,000
10	Boney M	"Mary's Boy Child" / "Oh My Lord"	1978	1,790,000
11	Wet Wet Wet	"Love Is All Around"	1994	1,780,000
12	Stevie Wonder	"I Just Called to Say I Love You"	1984	1,775,000
13	The Beatles	"I Want to Hold Your Hand"	1963	1,750,000
14	Aqua	"Barbie Girl"	1997	1,720,000
15	Cher	"Believe"	1998	1,670,000
16	Various artists	"Perfect Day"	1997	1,540,000
17	Bryan Adams	"(Everything I Do) I Do It for You"	1991	1,520,000
18	Ken Dodd	"Tears"	1965	1,521,000
19	The Beatles	"Can't Buy Me Love"	1964	1,520,000
20	John Travolta & Olivia Newton-John	"Summer Nights"	1978	1,515,000
21	Frankie Goes to Hollywood	"Two Tribes"	1984	1,510,000
22	Britney Spears	"Baby One More Time"	1999	1,450,000
23	Human League	"Don't You Want Me"	1981	1,430,000
24	John Lennon	"Imagine"	1975	1,426,000
25	Wham!	"Last Christmas" / "Everything She Wants"	1984	1,420,000
26	The Beatles	"I Feel Fine"	1964	1,410,000
27	Puff Daddy featuring Faith Evans	"I'll Be Missing You"	1997	1,400,000
28	Culture Club	"Karma Chameleon"	1983	1,405,000
29	The Seekers	"The Carnival is Over"	1965	1,400,000
30	Bill Haley & His Comets	"Rock Around the Clock"	1955	1,392,000
31	The Beatles	"Day Tripper"	1965	1,385,000
32	Village People	"Y.M.C.A."	1978	1,380,000
33	George Michael	"Careless Whisper"	1984	1,360,000
34	Engelbert Humperdinck	"Release Me"	1967	1,365,000
35	Whitney Houston	"I Will Always Love You"	1992	1,355,000
36	Jennifer Rush	"The Power of Love"	1985	1,321,530
37	Celine Dion	"My Heart Will Go On"	1998	1,312,551
38	Spice Girls	"Wannabe"	1996	1,269,841
39	Fugees	"Killing Me Softly"	1996	1,268,157
40	All Saints	"Never Ever"	1997	1,254,604
41	Coolio featuring L.V.	"Gangsta's Paradise"	1995	1,240,000
42	Paul Anka	"Diana"	1957	1,240,000
43	Celine Dion	"Think Twice"	1994	1,234,982
44	Elvis Presley	"It's Now or Never"	1960	1,210,000
45	Tom Jones	"Green Green Grass of Home"	1966	1,205,000
46	Dexy's Midnight Runners	"Come On Eileen"	1982	1,201,000
47	Blondie	"Heart of Glass"	1979	1,180,000
48	Harry Belafonte	"Mary's Boy Child"	1957	1,175,000
49	Engelbert Humperdinck	"The Last Waltz"	1967	1,160,000
50	Art Garfunkel	"Bright Eyes"	1979	1,155,000
51	Steps	"Heartbeat / Tragedy"	1998	1,150,285
52	David Soul	"Don't Give Up on Us"	1976	1,145,000
53	Gary Glitter	"I Love You Love Me Love"	1973	1,140,000
54	Soft Cell	"Tainted Love"	1981	1,135,000
55	Acker Bilk	"Stranger on the Shore"	1961	1,130,000
56	Run D.M.C vs. Jason Nevins	"It's Like That"	1998	1,110,000
57	Teletubbies	"Teletubbies Say Eh-Oh!"	1997	1,107,235
58	Babylon Zoo	"Spaceman"	1996	1,098,880
59	Frank Ifield	"I Remember You"	1962	1,096,000
60	Robson & Jerome	"I Believe" / "Up on the Roof"	1995	1,093,972
61	Whigfield	"Saturday Night"	1994	1,090,000
62	Boyzone	"No Matter What"	1998	1,070,000
63	Spice Girls	"2 Become 1"	1996	1,070,000
64	Cliff Richard & The Shadows	"The Young Ones"	1962	1,052,000
65	Michael Jackson	"Earth Song"	1995	1,038,821
66	Slade	"Merry Xmas Everybody"	1973	1,006,500
67	Brotherhood of Man	"Save Your Kisses for Me"	1976	1,006,200
68	Simon Park Orchestra	"Eye Level"	1972	1,005,500
69	New Order	"Blue Monday"	1983	1,001,000
70	Little Jimmy Osmond	"Long Haired Lover from Liverpool"	1972	998,000
71	Pink Floyd	"Another Brick in the Wall (Part 2)"	1979	995,000
72	Julie Covington	"Don't Cry for Me Argentina"	1976	993,000
73	Survivor	"Eye of the Tiger"	1982	990,000
74	The New Seekers	"I'd Like to Teach the World to Sing"	1971	990,000
75	Dawn	"Tie a Yellow Ribbon Round the Old Oak Tree"	1973	988,000
76	Adam & the Ants	"Stand and Deliver"	1981	985,000
77	Showaddywaddy	"Under the Moon of Love"	1976	985,000
78	Natalie Imbruglia	"Torn"	1997	982,000
79	Kylie Minogue & Jason Donovan	"Especially for You"	1988	982,000
80	Ian Dury & The Blockheads	"Hit Me With Your Rhythm Stick"	1978	979,100
81	The Archies	"Sugar, Sugar"	1969	979,000
82	Tight Fit	"The Lion Sleeps Tonight"	1982	978,000
83	Cliff Richard	"Bachelor Boy" / "The Next Time"	1962	976,000
84	Irene Cara	"Fame"	1982	975,000
85	Ray Parker Jr.	"Ghostbusters"	1984	974,000
86	Billy Joel	"Uptown Girl"	1983	974,000
87	Black Box	"Ride On Time"	1989	973,000
88	The Tornados	"Telstar"	1962	967,000
89	Oasis	"Wonderwall"	1995	966,940
90	The Pipes and Drums and Military; Band of the Royal Scots Dragoon Guards	"Amazing Grace"	1972	962,000
91	Take That	"Back for Good"	1995	959,000
92	Eiffel 65	"Blue (Da Ba Dee)"	1999	956,000
93	Rod Stewart	"Sailing"	1975	955,000
94	Pussycat	"Mississippi"	1976	947,000
