= People & Love =

Studio album by Johnny Lytle
- Released: 1972
- Recorded: August 1972 at Mercury Sound Studios in New York City
- Genre: Jazz
- Length: 36:49
- Label: Milestone MSP 9043
- Producer: Orrin Keepnews

Johnny Lytle chronology
The Soulful Rebel (1971)	People & Love (1972)	Everything Must Change (1977)

People & Love is an album by vibraphonist Johnny Lytle recorded in 1972 and originally issued on the Milestone label.

== Reception ==
Allmusic reviewer Brandon Burke stated "People & Love finds him diving ever deeper into the soul-jazz groove. The results are successful, to say the least. ...Recommended for fans of downtempo jazz-funk.

Professional ratings
Review scores
Source	Rating
Allmusic	4/5 stars

== Track listing ==
All compositions by Johnny Lytle except as indicated

1. "Where Is the Love" (Ralph MacDonald, William Salter) - 5:04
2. "Libra" - 8:59
3. "Family" - 3:49
4. "Tawhid" (Daahoud Hadi) - 7:00
5. "People Make the World Go 'Round" (Thom Bell, Linda Creed) - 11:57

== Personnel ==
- Johnny Lytle - vibraphone
- Marvin Cabell - flute, alto flute, tenor saxophone
- Daahoud Hadi (Butch Cornell) - organ, electric piano
- Bob Cranshaw - electric bass
- Josell Carter - drums
- Arthur Jenkins, Jr. - congas, percussion
- Betty Glamann - harp
