= List of Canadian number-one albums of 1993 =

These are the Canadian number-one albums of 1993. The chart was compiled and published by RPM every Saturday.

Issue date	Album	Artist
January 9	The Bodyguard	Soundtrack
January 16	The Bodyguard	Soundtrack
January 23	The Bodyguard	Soundtrack
January 30	The Bodyguard	Soundtrack
February 6	The Bodyguard	Soundtrack
February 13	The Bodyguard	Soundtrack
February 20	The Bodyguard	Soundtrack
February 27	The Bodyguard	Soundtrack
March 6	The Bodyguard	Soundtrack
March 13	Unplugged	Eric Clapton
March 20	Unplugged	Eric Clapton
March 27	Unplugged	Eric Clapton
April 3	Unplugged	Eric Clapton
April 10	Unplugged	Eric Clapton
April 17	Unplugged	Eric Clapton
April 24	Are You Gonna Go My Way	Lenny Kravitz
May 1	Are You Gonna Go My Way	Lenny Kravitz
May 8	Are You Gonna Go My Way	Lenny Kravitz
May 15	Pocket Full of Kryptonite	Spin Doctors
May 22	Pocket Full of Kryptonite	Spin Doctors
May 29	Pocket Full of Kryptonite	Spin Doctors
June 5	Pocket Full of Kryptonite	Spin Doctors
June 12	Janet.	Janet Jackson
June 19	Janet.	Janet Jackson
June 26	Unplugged...and Seated	Rod Stewart
July 3	Unplugged...and Seated	Rod Stewart
July 10	Unplugged...and Seated	Rod Stewart
July 17	Unplugged...and Seated	Rod Stewart
July 24	Zooropa	U2
July 31	Zooropa	U2
August 7	Zooropa	U2
August 14	Zooropa	U2
August 21	Zooropa	U2
August 28	Zooropa	U2
September 4	Zooropa	U2
September 11	Zooropa	U2
September 18	Dance Mix '93	Various Artists
September 25	Dance Mix '93	Various Artists
October 2	Dance Mix '93	Various Artists
October 9	Dance Mix '93	Various Artists
October 16	Dance Mix '93	Various Artists
October 23	Bat Out of Hell II: Back into Hell	Meat Loaf
October 30	Bat Out of Hell II: Back into Hell	Meat Loaf
November 6	Bat Out of Hell II: Back into Hell	Meat Loaf
November 13	Vs.	Pearl Jam
November 20	Bat Out of Hell II: Back into Hell	Meat Loaf
November 27	Bat Out of Hell II: Back into Hell	Meat Loaf
December 4	Bat Out of Hell II: Back into Hell	Meat Loaf
December 11	Bat Out of Hell II: Back into Hell	Meat Loaf
December 18	Bat Out of Hell II: Back into Hell	Meat Loaf
December 25	The Colour of My Love	Celine Dion

== See also ==
- 1993 in music
- RPM number-one hits of 1993
