= Everything Must Change (Johnny Lytle album) =

Studio album by Johnny Lytle
- Released: 1978
- Recorded: October 31, 1977
- Studio: Van Gelder Studio, Englewood Cliffs, NJ
- Genre: Jazz
- Length: 33:42
- Label: Muse; MR 5158
- Producer: Ozzie Cadena

Johnny Lytle chronology
People & Love (1972)	Everything Must Change (1978)	Fast Hands (1980)

Everything Must Change is an album by American jazz vibraphonist Johnny Lytle which was recorded in 1977 for the Muse label.

== Reception ==
Professional ratings
Review scores
Source	Rating
AllMusic	3/5 stars
The Rolling Stone Jazz Record Guide	3/5 stars

AllMusic awarded the album 3 stars with a review by Scott Yanow stating, "Despite the rather limp title track, this is a nice '77 set with Lytle, strong organist Big John Patton, and some solid honking tenor sax by David Schnitter".

== Track listing ==
All compositions by Johnny Lytle except where noted

1. "Send In The Clowns" (Stephen Sondheim) - 5:40
2. "Where or When" (Richard Rodgers, Lorenz Hart) - 4:32
3. "The Village Caller" - 4:40
4. "Everything Must Change" (Benard Ighner) - 3:50
5. "Lela" - 10:08
6. "It Wasn't Easy" - 4:52

== Personnel ==
- Johnny Lytle - vibraphone
- John Patton - organ (tracks 1 & 3–6)
- George Duvivier - bass
- Al Foster - drums
- Paul Marshall - synthesizer (track 1)
- Robbin Gordon - harp (track 1)
- David Schnitter - tenor saxophone (track 5)
