= Moon Child (Johnny Lytle album) =

Studio album by Johnny Lytle
- Released: 1962
- Recorded: July 5, 1962; New York City
- Genre: Jazz
- Label: Jazzland; JLP 81
- Producer: Orrin Keepnews

Johnny Lytle chronology
Nice and Easy (1962)	Moon Child (1962)	Got That Feeling! (1963)

Moon Child is the fourth album led by American jazz vibraphonist Johnny Lytle which was recorded in 1962 for the Jazzland label.

== Reception ==
Professional ratings
Review scores
Source	Rating
Allmusic	4/5 stars

The Allmusic site awarded the album 4 stars stating "Moon Child is a perfect example of how instrumental jazz can have commercial appeal without losing its integrity".

== Track listing ==
All compositions by Johnny Lytle except as indicated

1. "Moonchild" - 4:39
2. "Work Song" (Nat Adderley) - 6:38
3. "The Nearness of You" (Hoagy Carmichael, Ned Washington) - 4:28
4. "The Moor Man" - 4:02
5. "A Taste of Honey" (Bobby Scott, Ric Marlow) - 4:36
6. "When My Dreamboat Comes Home" (Cliff Friend, Dave Franklin) - 4:32
7. "Moonlight In Vermont" (John Blackburn, Karl Suessdorf) - 4:27
8. "The House Of Winchester" - 4:19

== Personnel ==
- Johnny Lytle - vibraphone
- Milton Harris - organ
- Steve Cooper - bass
- William "Peppy" Hinnant - drums
- Ray Barretto - congas
