= The Village Caller! =

Studio album by Johnny Lytle
- Released: 1964
- Recorded: September 18, 1963; New York City
- Genre: Jazz
- Length: 38:03
- Label: Riverside; RLP 480
- Producer: Orrin Keepnews

Johnny Lytle chronology
Got That Feeling! (1963)	The Village Caller! (1964)	The Loop (1965)

The Village Caller is the sixth album led by American jazz vibraphonist Johnny Lytle which was recorded in 1964 for the Riverside label.

== Reception ==
Professional ratings
Review scores
Source	Rating
AllMusic	3/5 stars
The Rolling Stone Jazz Record Guide	4/5 stars
The Penguin Guide to Jazz Recordings	3/4 stars

AllMusic awarded the album 3 stars stating "A touch lightweight at times but fun anyway... Most of the selections on this date are treated rhythmically, either R&B-ish or with a Latin feel. The results will not reward close listening, but Lytle plays well and this CD will be considered quite satisfying at parties".

== Track listing ==
All compositions by Johnny Lytle except as indicated

1. "The Village Caller" - 4:24
2. "On Green Dolphin Street" (Bronisław Kaper, Ned Washington) - 6:08
3. "Can't Help Lovin' Dat Man" (Oscar Hammerstein II, Jerome Kern) - 4:39
4. "Pedro Strodder" - 5:00
5. "Kevin Devin" - 3:23
6. "You Don't Know What Love Is" (Gene de Paul, Don Raye) - 3:59
7. "Unhappy, Happy Soul" - 7:12
8. "Solitude" (Eddie DeLange, Duke Ellington, Irving Mills) - 3:18

== Personnel ==
- Johnny Lytle - vibraphone
- Milton Harris - organ
- Bob Cranshaw - bass
- William "Peppy" Hinnant - drums
- Willie Rodriguez - percussion
