= List of Canadian number-one albums of 1994 =

The chart is compiled and published by RPM every Monday.These are the Canadian number-one albums of 1994. The chart was compiled and published by RPM every Monday.

| Issue date | Album | Artist |
|---|---|---|
| January 7 | The Colour of My Love | Celine Dion |
| January 10 | The Colour of My Love | Celine Dion |
| January 17 | The Colour of My Love | Celine Dion |
| January 24 | The Colour of My Love | Celine Dion |
| January 31 | The Colour of My Love | Celine Dion |
| February 7 | The Colour of My Love | Celine Dion |
| February 14 | The Colour of My Love | Celine Dion |
| February 21 | The Colour of My Love | Celine Dion |
| February 28 | The Colour of My Love | Celine Dion |
| March 7 | The Colour of My Love | Celine Dion |
| March 14 | The Colour of My Love | Celine Dion |
| March 21 | The Colour of My Love | Celine Dion |
| March 28 | The Sign | Ace of Base |
| April 4 | The Sign | Ace of Base |
| April 11 | The Sign | Ace of Base |
| April 18 | The Division Bell | Pink Floyd |
| April 25 | The Division Bell | Pink Floyd |
| May 2 | The Division Bell | Pink Floyd |
| May 9 | The Division Bell | Pink Floyd |
| May 16 | The Sign | Ace of Base |
| May 23 | The Sign | Ace of Base |
| May 30 | The Sign | Ace of Base |
| June 6 | The Sign | Ace of Base |
| June 13 | The Sign | Ace of Base |
| June 20 | The Sign | Ace of Base |
| June 27 | The Sign | Ace of Base |
| July 4 | The Sign | Ace of Base |
| July 11 | The Sign | Ace of Base |
| July 18 | The Sign | Ace of Base |
| July 25 | Voodoo Lounge | The Rolling Stones |
| August 1 | Voodoo Lounge | The Rolling Stones |
| August 8 | The Lion King | Soundtrack |
| August 15 | The Lion King | Soundtrack |
| August 22 | The Lion King | Soundtrack |
| August 29 | The Lion King | Soundtrack |
| September 5 | The Lion King | Soundtrack |
| September 12 | Forrest Gump Soundtrack | Various Artists |
| September 19 | Dance Mix '94 | Various Artists |
| September 26 | Dance Mix '94 | Various Artists |
| October 3 | Day for Night | The Tragically Hip |
| October 10 | Day for Night | The Tragically Hip |
| October 17 | Day for Night | The Tragically Hip |
| October 24 | Day for Night | The Tragically Hip |
| October 31 | Monster | R.E.M. |
| November 7 | Dance Mix '94 | Various Artists |
| November 14 | Unplugged in New York | Nirvana |
| November 21 | Unplugged in New York | Nirvana |
| November 28 | Unplugged in New York | Nirvana |
| December 5 | Hell Freezes Over | The Eagles |
| December 12 | Unplugged in New York | Nirvana |
| December 19 | Live at the BBC | The Beatles |

== See also ==
- 1994 in music
- RPM number-one hits of 1994
