= Nice and Easy (album) =

Studio album by Johnny Lytle
- Released: 1962
- Recorded: January 29, 1962; New York City
- Genre: Jazz
- Length: 39:58
- Label: Jazzland; JLP 67
- Producer: Orrin Keepnews

Johnny Lytle chronology
Happy Ground (1961)	Nice and Easy (1962)	Moon Child (1962)

Nice and Easy (subtitled The Soulful Vibes of Johnny Lytle) is the third album led by American jazz vibraphonist Johnny Lytle which was recorded in 1962 for the Jazzland label.

== Reception ==
Professional ratings
Review scores
Source	Rating
Allmusic	4.5/5 stars
The Penguin Guide to Jazz Recordings	3/4 stars

The Allmusic site awarded the album 4½ stars stating "Nice and Easy is a mellow and heavily bop-influenced set fairly far removed from his usual blues-tinged funk... The results are a welcome change of pace from Lytle's often frenetic and occasionally too-busy style, and the ballad-heavy selection is a nice balance of new tunes and a few familiar standards. Overall, this could well be Johnny Lytle's best set".

== Track listing ==
All compositions by Johnny Lytle except as indicated

1. "But Not for Me" (George Gershwin, Ira Gershwin) - 5:33
2. "Soul Time" (Bobby Timmons) - 4:33
3. "That's All" (Alan Brandt, Bob Haymes) - 5:23
4. "322-Wow!" - 4:07
5. "Coroner's Blues" - 7:22
6. "Nice and Easy" (Johnny Griffin) - 8:20
7. "Old Folks" (Dedette Lee Hill, Willard Robison) - 4:40

== Personnel ==
- Johnny Lytle - vibraphone
- Johnny Griffin - tenor saxophone (tracks 2–6)
- Bobby Timmons - piano
- Sam Jones - bass
- Louis Hayes - drums
