= List of best-selling singles of the 1990s in the United Kingdom =

The UK Singles Chart is a music chart compiled by the Official Charts Company that calculates the best-selling singles of the week in the United Kingdom. During the 1990s the chart was based purely on the sales of physical singles, with airplay figures excluded from the official chart.

At the beginning of the 1990s, sales of singles and albums in the United Kingdom were compiled on behalf of the British music industry by Gallup. This continued until 1994, when the contract to compile the UK charts was won by Millward Brown, who took over on 1 February 1994. On 1 July 1998 Chart Information Network (CIN) took over the management of the chart: CIN changed their name to the Official UK Charts Company in October 2001, later shortened to the Official Charts Company in 2008.

Unlike other decades, no decade-end charts for the 1990s for either singles or albums were broadcast on BBC Radio 1 at the end of 1999, and no detailed lists were published in the UK music trade magazine Music Week. Gallup's sales figures were not made available to its successors, and Millward Brown's sales data from 1994 to 1996 were later substantially revised. This made it difficult to obtain accurate sales figures for the decade. Two weeks before the end of the decade Music Week published lists of the top twenty best-selling singles and albums of the 1990s in the UK. Both top twenty lists included sales figures, but the subsequent revisions of the data have made the original 1999 figures unreliable.

The 19 September 2009 issue of the UK music trade magazine Music Week included a special supplement to celebrate its 50th anniversary. It contained updated charts of the top twenty best-selling singles of each decade of the magazine's existence, based on the most recent information available from the OCC. The following chart is therefore the most up to date estimate of the top twenty best-selling singles of the 1990s.

Between 1990 and 1999, 26 singles sold more than 1 million copies in the United Kingdom. British singer-songwriter Elton John had the best-selling single of the decade with his double A-side single "Candle in the Wind 1997"/"Something About the Way You Look Tonight", released in 1997. The single sold 4.86 million copies, over 3 million copies more than the second biggest-seller, "Unchained Melody"/"(There'll Be Bluebirds Over) The White Cliffs of Dover" by Robson & Jerome. At number five is Cher with "Believe", the best-selling single of all time by a female artist in the UK.

== Chart ==
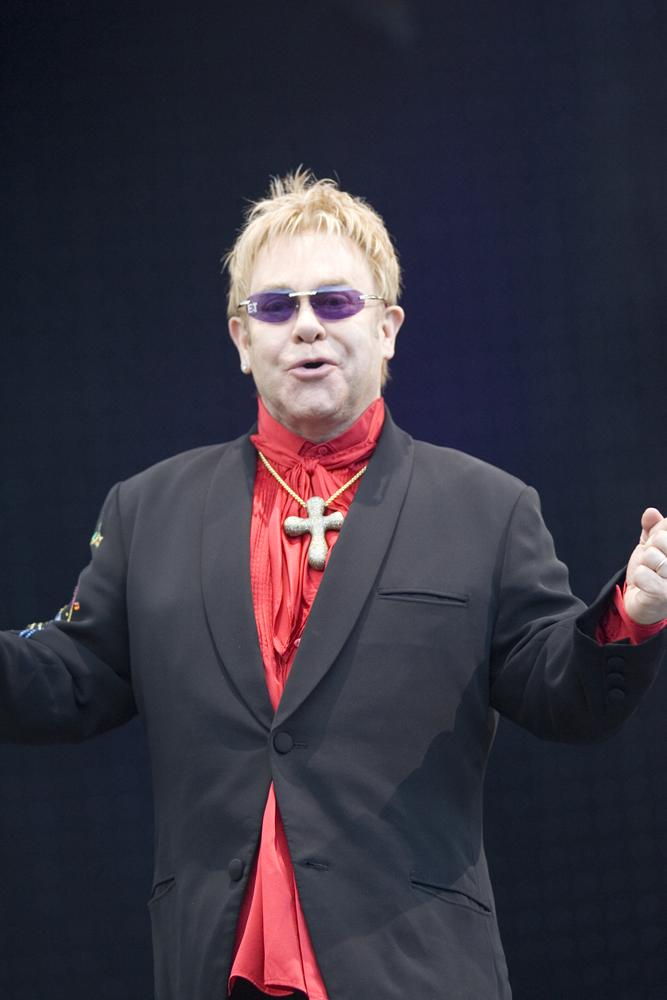
Elton John had the best-selling single of the decade with "Candle in the Wind 1997"/"Something About the Way You Look Tonight", a tribute to Princess Diana.

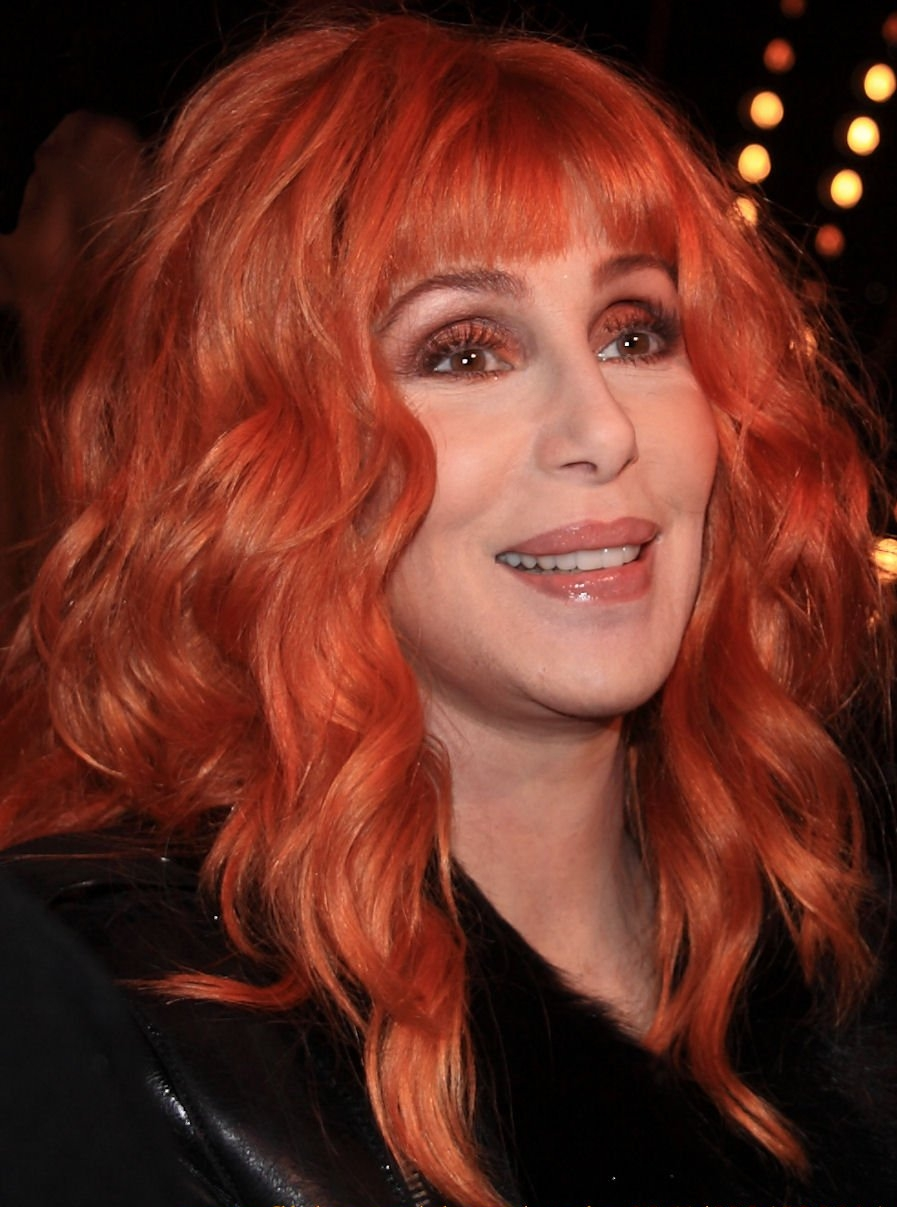
Cher had the best-selling single of the decade (as well as of all time) by a female artist, with the single "Believe".

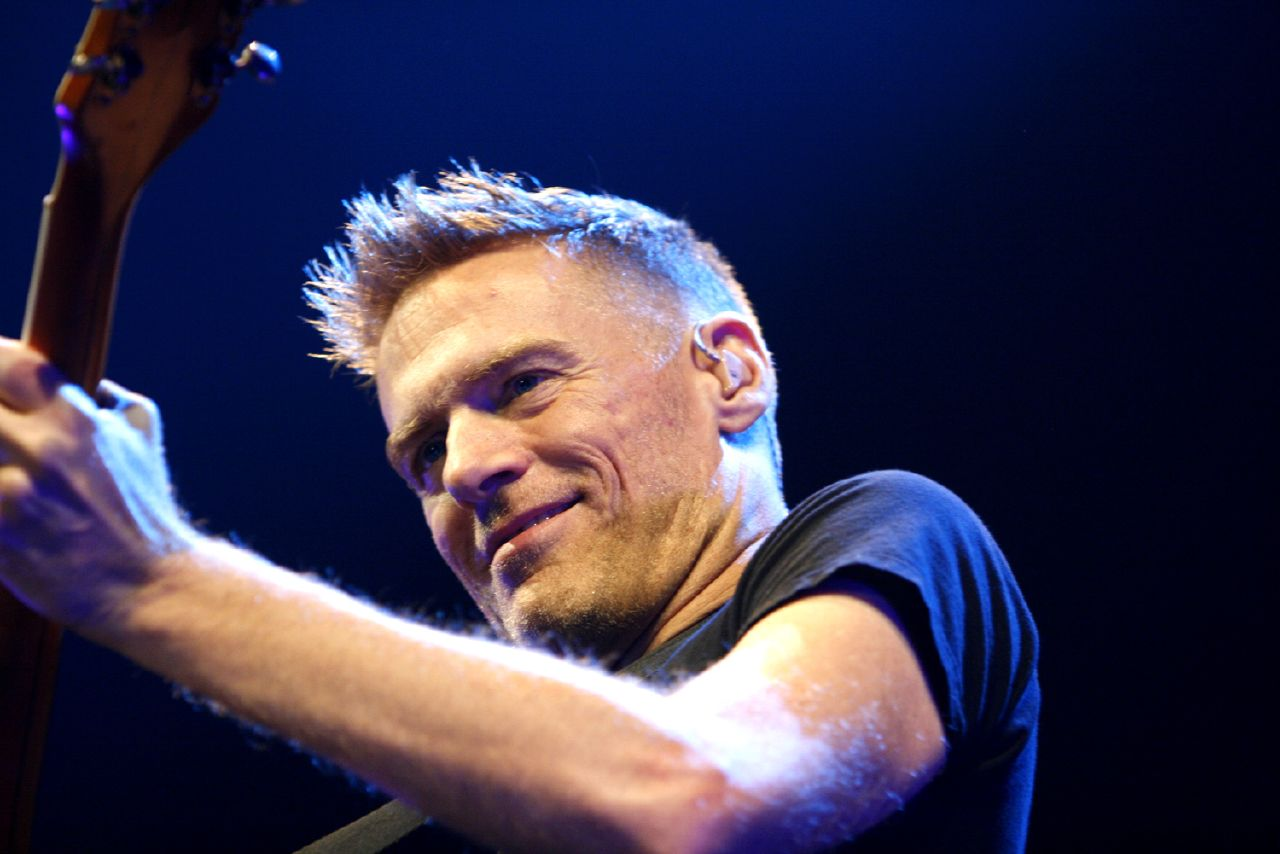
Bryan Adams holds the record for the longest consecutive stay at number one for a single with "(Everything I Do) I Do It for You", spending 16 consecutive weeks in the top spot. The song is at number 7 on this chart.

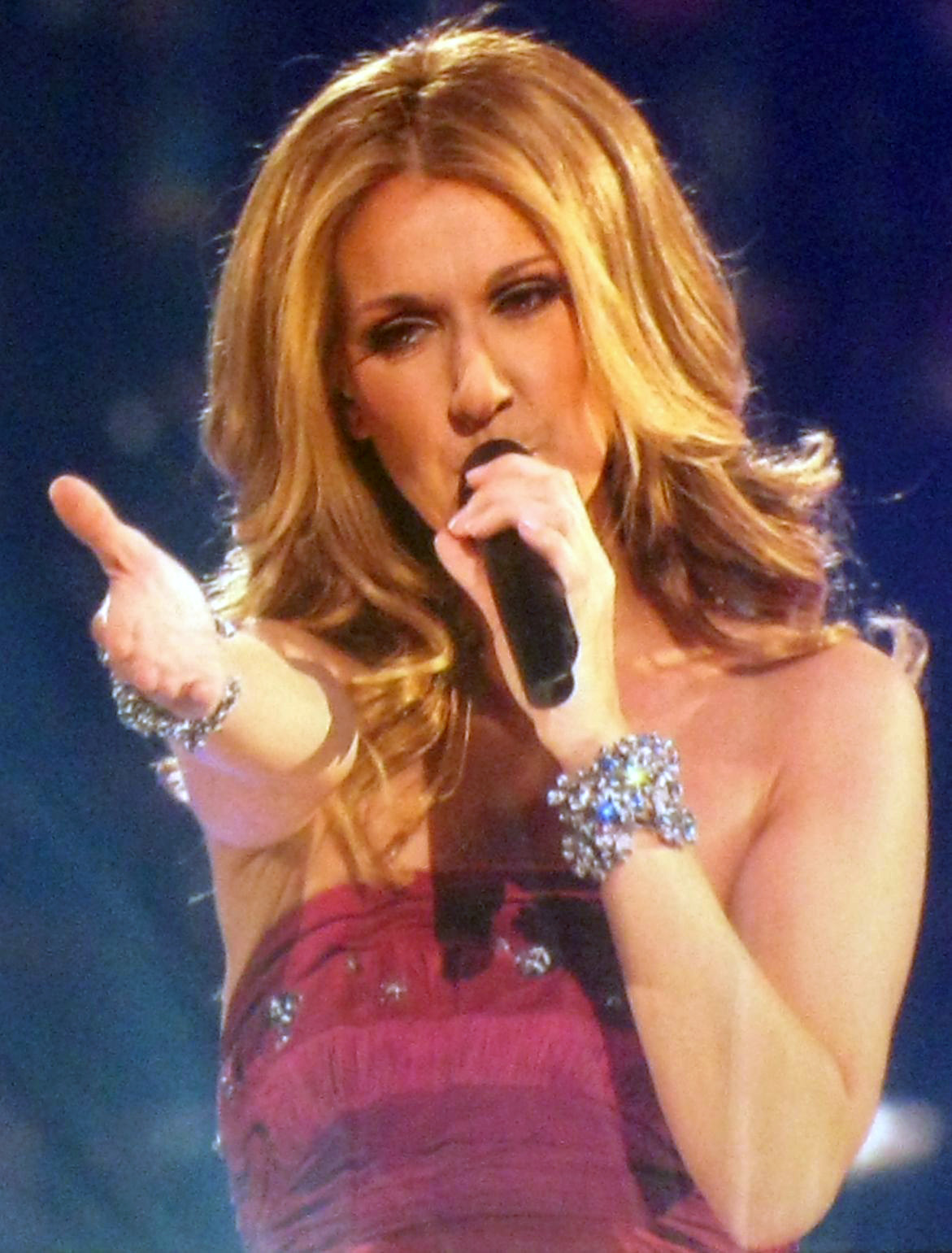
Celine Dion has two million sellers in the top twenty best-sellers of the 1990s: "My Heart Will Go On" at 11 and "Think Twice" at 16. The latter held the UK record for the longest time taken for a single to reach number one from its initial entry on the charts (16 weeks) until beaten by "Thinking Out Loud" in 2014.

No.	Title	Artist	Year	Estimated sales
1	"Candle in the Wind 1997"/"Something About the Way You Look Tonight"	Elton John	1997	4,864,611
2	"Unchained Melody"/"(There'll Be Bluebirds Over) The White Cliffs of Dover"	Robson & Jerome	1995	1,840,000
3	"Love Is All Around"	Wet Wet Wet	1994	1,783,827
4	"Barbie Girl"	Aqua	1997	1,722,400
5	"Believe"	Cher	1998	1,672,108
6	"Perfect Day"	Various Artists	1997	1,540,000
7	"(Everything I Do) I Do It for You"	Bryan Adams	1991	1,527,824
8	"...Baby One More Time"	Britney Spears	1999	1,445,301
9	"I'll Be Missing You"	Puff Daddy and Faith Evans featuring 112	1997	1,409,688
10	"I Will Always Love You"	Whitney Houston	1992	1,355,055
11	"My Heart Will Go On"	Celine Dion	1998	1,312,551
12	"Wannabe"	Spice Girls	1996	1,269,841
13	"Killing Me Softly"	Fugees	1996	1,268,000
14	"Never Ever"	All Saints	1997	1,254,604
15	"Gangsta's Paradise"	Coolio featuring L.V.	1995	1,246,000
16	"Think Twice"	Celine Dion	1994	1,234,000
17	"Heartbeat"/"Tragedy"	Steps	1998	1,150,285
18	"Teletubbies Say Eh-Oh!"	Teletubbies	1997	1,100,000
19	"Spaceman"	Babylon Zoo	1996	1,098,000
20	"It's Like That"	Run–D.M.C. vs Jason Nevins	1998	1,092,000

- Note: All the singles in this list reached number 1 on the UK Singles Chart.
