= Close Enough for Jazz =

Studio album by Johnny Lytle
- Released: 1969
- Recorded: 1969 in New York City
- Genre: Jazz
- Label: Solid State SS-18056
- Producer: Sonny Lester

Johnny Lytle chronology
Be Proud (1969)	Close Enough for Jazz (1969)	The Soulful Rebel (1971)

Close Enough for Jazz is an album by vibraphonist Johnny Lytle recorded in 1969 and originally issued on the Solid State label.

== Reception ==
The Allmusic review by Craig Lytle states "Johnny Lytle was always true to his vibes. In other words, the passion he had for playing his music through his vibes was ever so present on each outing. This album is no different".

Professional ratings
Review scores
Source	Rating
Allmusic	4/5 stars

== Track listing ==
All compositions by Johnny Lytle except as indicated

1. "Tenderly" (Walter Gross, Jack Lawrence) – 3:03
2. "Just a Little Bit of Holiness" – 2:44
3. "Gwink" – 3:40
4. "Embraceable You" (George Gershwin, Ira Gershwin) – 3:55
5. "At Last" (Mack Gordon, Harry Warren) – 2:47
6. "Close Enough for Jazz" – 4:40
7. "Agapee/Polemos" – 6:28
8. "Baby, You Make Me Feel So Good" – 4:55

== Personnel ==
- Johnny Lytle – vibraphone, xylophone
- Billy Nunn – organ
- Paul West – bass
- Josell Carter – drums
- Lawrence Killian – congas
- Marcel Lytle – vocals (track 8)
