= A Man and a Woman (Johnny Lytle album) =

Studio album by Johnny Lytle
- Released: 1967
- Recorded: 1967
- Studio: A&R Studio, New York City
- Genre: Jazz
- Label: Solid State SS-18014
- Producer: Sonny Lester

Johnny Lytle chronology
Swingin' at the Gate (1967)	A Man and a Woman (1967)	The Sound of Velvet Soul (1968)

A Man and a Woman is an album by American vibraphonist Johnny Lytle featuring jazz interpretations of Francis Lai's score for the 1966 French film A Man and a Woman recorded in 1967 and originally issued on the Solid State label. (Note: There is also a 1977 live album by Isaac Hayes & Dionne Warwick, with the same title, having no relationship with the film.)

== Reception ==
The Allmusic review by Richie Unterberger stated "It's bourgeois to the core, for sure. But it's also archetypal of a certain media stereotype of European elegance, exuding a certain charm despite its overt sentimentality".

Professional ratings
Review scores
Source	Rating
Allmusic	3/5 stars

== Track listing ==
All compositions by Francis Lai

1. "Stronger Than Us" - 4:43
2. "Today It's You" - 3:05
3. "Samba Saravah" - 3:57
4. "A Man and a Woman" - 3:43
5. "A Man and a Woman" [Alternate Take] - 3:29
6. "Stronger Than Us (Bossa Nova)" - 4:29
7. "In Our Shadow" - 5:05

== Personnel ==
- Johnny Lytle - vibraphone
- Jim Foster - organ
- Richard Davis - bass
- William "Peppy" Hinnant - drums
- Johnny Pacheco - Latin drums
