= Got That Feeling! =

Album by Johnny Lytle

Studio album by Johnny Lytle
- Released: 1963
- Recorded: April 3, 1963; Plaza Sound Studios, New York City
- Genre: Jazz
- Length: 36:59
- Label: Riverside; RLP 456
- Producer: Orrin Keepnews

Johnny Lytle chronology
Moon Child (1962)	Got That Feeling! (1963)	The Village Caller! (1964)

Got That Feeling! is the fifth album led by American jazz vibraphonist Johnny Lytle which was recorded in 1963 for the Riverside label.

== Reception ==
Professional ratings
Review scores
Source	Rating
Down Beat	3.5/5 stars
Allmusic	4/5 stars

The Allmusic site awarded the album 4 stars stating "Got That Feeling! is exactly what it set out to be -- groove-oriented and infectious, but swinging, improvisatory, and imaginative. The material on this LP isn't difficult to absorb; accessibility was Lytle's goal, and he accomplishes that goal".

== Track listing ==
All compositions by Johnny Lytle except as indicated

1. "Got That Feeling!" - 4:50
2. "Pow-Wow" (Nat Adderley, Joe Zawinul) - 2:38
3. "In the Wee Small Hours of the Morning" (Bob Hilliard, David Mann) - 3:17
4. "Big John Grady" - 3:28
5. "The Breeze and I" (Ernesto Lecuona, Al Stillman) - 4:59
6. "It Ain't Necessarily So" (George Gershwin, Ira Gershwin) - 4:26
7. "Lela" - 4:30
8. "Love Is Here to Stay" (Gershwin, Gershwin) - 3:44
9. "The Soulful One" - 5:07

== Personnel ==
- Johnny Lytle - vibraphone
- Milton Harris - organ
- Milt Hinton - bass
- William "Peppy" Hinnant - drums
