= Blue Vibes =

Studio album by Johnny Lytle
- Released: 1960
- Recorded: June 16, 1960; New York City
- Genre: Jazz
- Length: 40:18
- Label: Jazzland; JLP 22

Johnny Lytle chronology
Blue Vibes (1960)	Happy Ground (1961)

Blue Vibes is the debut studio album by American jazz vibraphonist Johnny Lytle which was recorded in 1960 for the Jazzland label.

== Reception ==
Professional ratings
Review scores
Source	Rating
Allmusic	3/5 stars

David Szatmary of Allmusic notes this album "introduced Lytle's bluesy funk".

== Track listing ==
All compositions by Johnny Lytle except as indicated

1. "Blue Vibes" - 5:36
2. "Over the Rainbow" (Harold Arlen, Yip Harburg) - 5:16
3. "For Heaven's Sake" (Elise Bretton, Sherman Edwards, Donald Meyer) - 4:35
4. "Movin' Nicely" (Milt Jackson) - 4:57
5. "Autumn Leaves" (Joseph Kosma, Johnny Mercer, Jacques Prévert) - 7:06
6. "Mister Trundel" - 6:27
7. "Canadian Sunset" (Eddie Heywood, Norman Gimbel) - 6:21

== Personnel ==
- Johnny Lytle - vibraphone
- Milton Harris - organ
- Albert Heath - drums
