= Fast Hands =

Studio album by Johnny Lytle
- Released: 1980
- Recorded: April 17, 1980
- Studio: Sound Heights Studio, Brooklyn, NY
- Genre: Jazz
- Length: 33:43
- Label: Muse; MR 5185
- Producer: Houston Person

Johnny Lytle chronology
Everything Must Change (1977)	Fast Hands (1980)	Good Vibes (1981)

Fast Hands is an album by American jazz vibraphonist Johnny Lytle which was recorded in 1980 for the Muse label.

== Reception ==
Professional ratings
Review scores
Source	Rating
AllMusic	3/5 stars
The Rolling Stone Jazz Record Guide	3/5 stars

AllMusic awarded the album 3 stars with a review stating, "This is an enjoyable album".

== Track listing ==
All compositions by Johnny Lytle except as indicated

1. "Sister Silver" - 5:45
2. "Tomorrow" (Charles Strouse, Martin Charnin) - 6:10
3. "Brightness" - 4:49
4. Bein' Green" (Joe Raposo) - 4:41
5. "The Man - 7:22
6. "Blues to Be There" (Duke Ellington, Billy Strayhorn) - 4:56

== Personnel ==
- Johnny Lytle - vibraphone, percussion
- Houston Person - tenor saxophone
- Mickey Tucker - keyboards
- Mervyn Bronson - bass
- Idris Muhammad - drums
- Lawrence Killian - congas, percussion
- Fred Miller - percussion (track 2)
