= Good Vibes (Johnny Lytle album) =

Studio album by Johnny Lytle
- Released: 1982
- Recorded: October 8, 1981; Brooklyn, New York
- Genre: Jazz
- Label: Muse; MR 5271
- Producer: Houston Person

Johnny Lytle chronology
Fast Hands (1980)	Good Vibes (1982)	Happy Ground (1989)

Good Vibes is an album by American jazz vibraphonist Johnny Lytle which was recorded in 1981 for the Muse label.

== Reception ==
Professional ratings
Review scores
Source	Rating
AllMusic	3/5 stars
The Rolling Stone Jazz Record Guide	3/5 stars

AllMusic awarded the album 3 stars with a review stating, "The ever-gregarious Johnny Lytle never cared too much for categorizing his music; he just loved to play all kinds, and this album is one of those outings".

== Track listing ==
1. "So What" (Miles Davis) - 5:56
2. "Turn the Hands of Time" (Peabo Bryson) - 5:53
3. "New York, New York" (Fred Ebb, John Kander) - 4:20
4. "Didn't We?" (Jimmy Webb) - 5:23
5. "After Supper" (Neal Hefti) - 6:06
6. "Aaron's Theme" (Mike Post) - 5:14

== Personnel ==
- Johnny Lytle - vibraphone
- Houston Person - tenor saxophone
- Neal Creque - piano
- David Braham - synthesizer
- Melvin Sparks - guitar
- Jimmy Lewis - bass, electric bass
- Idris Muhammad - drums
- Ralph Dorsey - percussion
