= Think Twice (Celine Dion song) =

1994 single by Celine Dion

Single by Celine Dion

from the album The Colour of My Love
- B-side: "L'amour existe encore"
- Released: 1 August 1994
- Studio: Westside (London); Morin Heights (Morin-Heights); Larrabee Sound (North Hollywood); Hit Factory (New York)
- Genre: Soft rock; pop rock
- Length: 4:47
- Label: Columbia; Epic
- Songwriters: Andy Hill; Peter Sinfield
- Producers: Christopher Neil; Aldo Nova

Celine Dion singles chronology
"Misled" (1994)	"Think Twice" (1994)	"Only One Road" (1994)

Music video
- "Think Twice" on YouTube

"Think Twice" is a song by Canadian singer Celine Dion, released in July 1994 by Columbia Records and Epic Records as the third single from her English‑language album The Colour of My Love (1993). Written by Andy Hill and Peter Sinfield, and produced by Christopher Neil and Aldo Nova, the track is a rock‑leaning ballad built around a prominent guitar solo.

Although it was not a major hit in the United States, "Think Twice" became one of Dion's most successful international singles, reaching number one in the United Kingdom, Ireland, Sweden, Norway, the Netherlands, and Belgium's Flanders. In the UK, it topped the UK Singles Chart for seven weeks and became only the fourth single by a female artist to sell more than one million copies there. The song received an Ivor Novello Award for the Best Song Musically and Lyrically and was later included on the European and Australian editions of Dion's greatest hits album All the Way... A Decade of Song (1999), as well as the European edition of My Love: Essential Collection (2008).

== Critical reception ==
Thom Duffy from Billboard magazine ranked "Think Twice" as the 8th best song of 1995, calling it "more genuine than by a score of other pop divas". AllMusic senior editor Stephen Thomas Erlewine wrote in his review of the album that it offered "careful production, professional songwriting", illustrated by "When I Fall in Love", "The Power of Love", and "Think Twice". Chicago Tribune critic Brad Webber gave a mixed review, describing Dion's vocals as "forcefully resonant and multiflavored". He added, "On The Colour of My Love you've got to dig deep to find them, though, past the crooked roots of a Janet Jackson impersonation ('Misled' and 'Think Twice'). With her attempt at soul, you can categorize Dion as fairly shallow, sort of a female Michael Bolton". Tom Ewing from Freaky Trigger wrote that Dion, "with a sharp, keening edge to her voice, [is] picking her words with care as she treads delicately through the song".

Dave Sholin from the Gavin Report wrote, "By now there's little reason not to assume that Dion's remarkable vocal skill could turn 'Whoomp! (There It Is)' into an emotional masterpiece. However, her talents are much better utilized on this riveting ballad about a couple on the brink of ending a relationship". Dennis Hunt from the LA Times compared Dion to singers like Mariah Carey and Whitney Houston, noting "that grandiose, note-stretching finish" on the track.

Pan-European magazine Music & Media wrote that Dion "interprets [the song] like a female Aaron Neville". In their review of the album, they added, "Most striking are her vocal abilities, still increasing with each release. On another ballad, 'Think Twice', you can hear her doing the most difficult thing: the 'Aaron Neville double back vocal flip'". Alan Jones from Music Week described it as "a ponderous power ballad, over earnest and over sung". John Kilgo from The Network Forty called it "another classic ballad". Christopher Smith from TalkAboutPopMusic described it as a "seemingly tender love song that then explodes into a power ballad".

== Commercial performance ==
Upon its release, "Think Twice" became a major hit in Europe and Australia. Unusually for Dion's discography, the song was not a significant success in the United States, yet it became one of her most successful singles in the United Kingdom, eventually ranking among the country's biggest-selling records of all time. It remains Dion's second-biggest hit in the UK, surpassed only by "My Heart Will Go On". It finished as the fifth-best-selling single of 1995 in the United Kingdom, with 696,000 copies sold that year. It was also the most successful song of the year by both a female artist and a solo artist.

"Think Twice" became the first UK number-one single not to be issued on vinyl. It was certified platinum, and as of September 2017, it has sold 1,418,966 copies in the UK. "Think Twice" spent seven weeks at number one on the UK Singles Chart and became only the fourth single by a female artist to sell more than one million copies there. The song also reached number one in several other European countries, including Belgium's Flanders, Ireland, the Netherlands, Norway, and Sweden. In Australia, it peaked at number two and was certified platinum. It also earned gold certifications in Belgium, Denmark, and the Netherlands.

== Music video ==
The music video for "Think Twice" was directed by Randee St. Nicholas. It opens with Dion lying in bed before she wakes and begins singing. A car arrives outside her house, and her lover (played by model Steve Santagati) enters the home. After greeting her, he withdraws emotionally and lies on the bed, while Dion remains in the background. He is later shown carving ice sculptures with a chainsaw, intercut with scenes of the couple in conflict. As Dion continues singing, the video alternates between shots of her in a blue jacket and scenes of her partner working on the sculptures. She leans against one of them while he rests in bed, before he eventually gets up. A guitar interlude follows, accompanied by images of him in his garage and further moments of tension between the two, culminating in his departure by car. He is then shown sitting in sawdust before returning to destroy the sculptures. In the final sequence, he walks back into the garage, reconciles with Dion, and the two embrace in the sunlight as the video concludes.

== Live performances ==
"Think Twice" was performed by Dion at the 1995 World Music Awards. She also performed it during selected dates of her 1994–95 The Colour of My Love Tour, her 1996–97 Falling into You: Around the World, and her 1998–99 Let's Talk About Love World Tour. She included the song in her 2008–09 Taking Chances World Tour. Dion performed it during her 2011–19 Las Vegas residency show Celine between 2017 and 2018. The song was part of her Live 2017 and Live 2018 tours, and it was also performed at her BST Hyde Park concert in London on 5 July 2019.

== Accolades ==
In 1995, "Think Twice" received an Ivor Novello Award for the Best Song Musically and Lyrically.

== Formats and track listing ==
- Australian cassette and CD single; Canadian cassette single; US 7-inch, cassette, and CD single
1. "Think Twice" (edit) – 4:05
2. "L'amour existe encore" – 3:50
- European CD and UK cassette single
1. "Think Twice" (radio edit) – 4:10
2. "Le monde est stone" – 3:40
- European and UK CD maxi-single
1. "Think Twice" (radio edit) – 4:10
2. "Le monde est stone" – 3:40
3. "If Love Is Out the Question" – 3:52
4. "If You Asked Me To" – 3:53
- Japanese CD single
1. "Think Twice" (edit) – 4:11
2. "L'amour existe encore" – 3:51
3. "(If There Was) Any Other Way" – 4:01
- UK cassette and second CD single
1. "Think Twice" (album version) – 4:45
2. "The Power of Love" (album version) – 5:42
3. "Where Does My Heart Beat Now" (album version) – 4:32

== Charts ==
=== Weekly charts ===
Weekly chart performance
Chart (1994–1995)	Peak position
Australia (ARIA)	2
Belgium (Ultratop 50 Flanders)	1
Belgium (Ultratop 50 Wallonia)	10
Canada Top Singles (RPM)	13
Canada Adult Contemporary (RPM)	3
Canada Retail Singles (The Record)	14
Canada Contemporary Hit Radio (The Record)	15
Canada Pop Adult (The Record)	4
Denmark (Tracklisten)	2
Europe (Eurochart Hot 100)	2
Europe (European AC Radio)	9
Europe (European Hit Radio)	15
Finland (Suomen virallinen lista)	19
Germany (GfK)	19
Iceland (Íslenski Listinn Topp 40)	26
Ireland (IRMA)	1
Israel (Israeli Singles Chart)	7
Netherlands (Dutch Top 40)	1
Netherlands (Single Top 100)	1
New Zealand (Recorded Music NZ)	20
Norway (VG-lista)	1
Quebec Radio Songs (ADISQ)	2
Scottish Singles Sales (Official Charts)	1
Spain (Top 40 Radio)	6
Sweden (Sverigetopplistan)	1
Switzerland (Schweizer Hitparade)	6
UK Singles (Official Charts)	1
UK Airplay (Music Week)	2
US Billboard Hot 100	95
US Adult Contemporary (Billboard)	21
US Cash Box Top 100	92

=== Year-end charts ===
1994 year-end chart performance
Chart (1994)	Position
Canada Top Singles (RPM)	82
Canada Adult Contemporary (RPM)	25
UK Singles (OCC)	30

1995 year-end chart performance
Chart (1995)	Position
Australia (ARIA)	11
Belgium (Ultratop 50 Flanders)	3
Belgium (Ultratop 50 Wallonia)	29
Europe (Eurochart Hot 100)	8
Germany (Media Control)	62
Israel (Israeli Singles Chart)	42
Latvia (Latvijas Top 50)	105
Netherlands (Dutch Top 40)	3
Netherlands (Single Top 100)	7
Norway Russefeiring Period (VG-lista)	4
Sweden (Topplistan)	6
Switzerland (Schweizer Hitparade)	9
UK Singles (OCC)	5
UK Airplay (Music Week)	11

=== Decade-end charts ===
Decade-end chart performance
Chart (1990–1999)	Position
Belgium (Ultratop 50 Flanders)	38
Ireland (IRMA)	6
Netherlands (Dutch Top 40)	25
UK Singles (OCC)	16

=== All-time charts ===
All-time chart performance
Chart	Position
UK Singles (OCC)	58

== Certifications and sales ==
Certifications
Region	Certification	Certified units/sales
Australia (ARIA)	Platinum	70,000^{^}
Belgium (BRMA)	Gold	25,000^{*}
Denmark (IFPI Danmark)	Gold	45,000^{‡}
Netherlands (NVPI)	Gold	50,000^{^}
United Kingdom (BPI)	Platinum	1,418,966
^{*} Sales figures based on certification alone.^{^} Shipments figures based on certification alone.^{‡} Sales+streaming figures based on certification alone.

== Release history ==
Release dates
Region	Date	Format	Label	Ref.
Australia	1 August 1994	CD; cassette	Epic	
Japan	21 August 1994	CD	Epic/Sony	
Canada	14 September 1994	CD	Columbia	
United Kingdom	10 October 1994	CD; cassette	Epic	

== See also ==
- 1994 in British music
- 1995 in British music
- List of best-selling singles of the 1900s in the United Kingdom
- List of best-selling singles of the 1990s in the United Kingdom
- List of Dutch Top 40 number-one singles of 1995
- List of Ivor Novello Award winners and nominees (1990s–2000s)
- List of million-selling singles in the United Kingdom
- List of number-one singles and albums in Sweden
- List of number-one singles of 1995 (Ireland)
- List of number-one songs in Norway
- List of top 25 singles for 1995 in Australia
- List of UK singles chart number ones of the 1990s
- List of UK top-ten singles in 1994
- List of UK top-ten singles in 1995
- Ultratop 50 number-one hits of 1995
