= Misled (Celine Dion song) =

Single by Celine Dion

from the album The Colour of My Love
- B-side: "Real Emotion"
- Released: 11 April 1994
- Studio: Cove City Sound
- Genre: Dance-pop
- Length: 3:30
- Label: Columbia; Epic
- Songwriters: Peter Zizzo; Jimmy Bralower
- Producer: Ric Wake

Celine Dion singles chronology
"L'amour existe encore" (1994)	"Misled" (1994)	"Think Twice" (1994)

Music video
- "Misled" on YouTube

"Misled" is a song recorded by Canadian singer Celine Dion for her third English-language studio album, The Colour of My Love (1993). It was issued as the album's second single in April 1994. The track was written by Peter Zizzo and Jimmy Bralower, and produced by Ric Wake. "Misled" topped the US Billboard Dance Club Play chart, becoming Dion's first song to reach number one there. It also peaked at number four on the Canadian RPM 100 Hit Tracks chart, number 15 on the UK Singles Chart, and number 23 on the Billboard Hot 100. In 2008, "Misled" was included on the European edition of Dion's greatest hits compilation, My Love: Ultimate Essential Collection.

== Critical reception ==
AllMusic editor Jose F. Promis gave the song four out of five stars. He described the album version as "definitive and muscular", the "groove edit" as a "soulful, more hip-hop-leaning take on the song", the "MK radio remix" and the "Richie Jones club mix" as "two smooth and sleek house remixes", and "MK's history mix" as "deeper and housier". He concluded that the single is a rarity, writing that "...she is soulful, sassy, exuberant, campy, and almost just plain nasty, and it works, resulting in a long-forgotten, and definitive highlight (and oddity) in the singer's illustrious career". Larry Flick from Billboard wrote that Dion "vamps with her rarely displayed, assertive, white-knuckled edge". Troy J. Augusto from Cashbox described the track as "an upbeat, aggressive power dance number", noting its "too catchy chorus and left-of-center edginess".

Writing about Dion's "forcefully resonant and multiflavored vocals", Chicago Tribune editor Brad Webber commented, "On The Colour of My Love, you've got to dig deep to find them, though, past the crooked roots of a Janet Jackson impersonation ('Misled' and 'Think Twice')". Dave Sholin from the Gavin Report wrote, "Mention the name Celine Dion and a lot of people are inclined to think of her hit ballads. To be sure, this French-Canadian songstress has had some of the biggest of the decade. But she's just as comfortable picking up the tempo, which she does with ease on this bright and tight Ric Wake production". Another GR editor called the track "powerful".

Lennox Herald stated that Dion "gives it her all and manages to inject a certain dramatic punch". Alan Jones from Music Week considered it "an altogether less demanding, and less enticing song" than "The Power of Love", adding that "it chugs along cheerfully enough, and Dion lets rip once or twice, but the song's saving grace is a contagious chorus". Pan-European magazine Music & Media wrote, "With 'Misled' the Canadian chanteuse shows she can also handle the uptempo material with care". Mark Sutherland from Smash Hits gave the song two out of five, writing, "This is slightly better, as Ms Dion goes for the Janet Jackson funky lay-dee approach". Another Smash Hits editor, Gina Morris, gave "Misled" three out of five, calling it "another hysterically-spikey love song about lovers lost".

In 1997, British DJ Dean Lambert selected the song as one of his top 10 tunes, stating, "I love this record. You'll probably find that somewhere some girl has sung this to a guy thinking that she has been hard done by. But girls, let me tell you, you aren't the only ones. Back to the record, this is an instant floorfiller. The vocals are reality, but that's life. It's a shame it never got a British release sooner than it did because I know everyone bought the import version at least two years before and I'm sure it would have done a lot better if it had been released sooner in Britain, but I love it". In a 2018 review, Pip Ellwood-Hughes from Entertainment Focus wrote that the song "saw Dion take a rare departure into a dance-led sound". Christopher Smith from Talk About Pop Music described it as "groovy" and "full-of-life" in his 2019 review.

== Commercial performance ==
In Canada, "Misled" entered the RPM 100 Hit Tracks chart in March 1994 and peaked at number four two months later. On the RPM Adult Contemporary chart, it reached number two and remained in that position for five weeks. On The Record's charts, "Misled" peaked at number seven on Retail Singles and number two on Contemporary Hit Radio. In the United States, the song debuted on the Billboard Hot 100 in April 1994 and reached number 23 in June 1994. It became Dion's first song to top the US Billboard Dance Club Play chart, where it stayed at number one for two weeks. It also reached number 15 on the US Adult Contemporary chart. In the United Kingdom, "Misled" originally reached number 40 on the UK Singles Chart in April 1994. After its re-release, it achieved a new peak of number 15 in November 1995. The song entered the Australian chart in May 1994 and reached number 55 the following month. In June 1994, it also debuted on the charts in New Zealand and Germany, where it peaked at numbers 31 and 83, respectively.

== Music video ==
The accompanying music video for "Misled" was directed by Randee St. Nicholas and released in June 1994. It was filmed in Los Angeles, with Robert Brinkman serving as director of photography and John Hopgood producing the video. The clip alternates between scenes of Dion performing in a club, posing in front of a mirror and in a bathtub, and arguing with a lover. The video was later included on Dion's DVD collection All the Way... A Decade of Song & Video (2001) and on the UK enhanced CD single of "A New Day Has Come". It was also made available in remastered HD on Dion's official YouTube channel in 2012.

== Live performances ==
"Misled" was performed by Dion during her 1994–95 The Colour of My Love Tour, her 1995–96 D'eux Tour, and her 1996–97 Falling Into You Around the World Tour. She also sang the song during the opening night of her Live 2017 tour in Copenhagen. Live versions of "Misled" appear on The Colour of My Love Concert DVD (1995), the Live à Paris DVD (1996), and the Live in Memphis VHS (1998).

== Accolades ==
"Misled" won the BMI Pop Award for Most Performed Song in the United States.

== Formats and track listing ==
"Misled" was remixed by Marc Kinchen (MK remixes), Eric Miller (E-Smoove remixes), Shedrick Guy (the groove remixes), and Richie Jones (Richie Jones remixes, including the serious mix, hub dub, and remix).

- 7-inch, cassette, and CD single
1. "Misled" – 3:30
2. "Real Emotion" – 4:26
- Australian cassette and CD single
1. "Misled" – 3:30
2. "Real Emotion" – 4:26
3. "Misled" (the serious mix) – 7:22
4. "Misled" (hub dub) – 6:42
- European and UK CD maxi-single
1. "Misled" – 3:30
2. "Love Can Move Mountains" – 4:53
3. "Real Emotion" – 4:26
4. "Misled" (remix) – 7:22
- European and UK remixes CD maxi-single
1. "Misled" (album version) – 3:30
2. "Misled" (MK mix) – 6:41
3. "Misled" (MK dub) – 8:56
4. "Misled" (MK lead mix) – 6:41
- Japanese CD single
1. "Misled" – 3:32
2. "Real Emotion" – 4:27
3. "Where Does My Heart Beat Now" – 4:32
- US CD maxi-single
1. "Misled" (album version) – 3:30
2. "Misled" (the groove edit) – 4:43
3. "Misled" (MK radio remix edit) – 3:49
4. "Misled" (Richie Jones club mix) – 7:22
5. "Misled" (the groove mix) – 5:52
6. "Misled" (MK's history mix) – 6:41
- US 12-inch maxi-single
1. "Misled" (Richie Jones club mix) – 7:22
2. "Misled" (MK's history mix) – 6:41
3. "Misled" (album version) – 3:30
4. "Misled" (MK's redirect mix) – 6:57
5. "Misled" (MK dub) – 8:56
- US promotional double 12-inch single
1. "Misled" (MK's redirect mix) – 6:57
2. "Misled" (MK mix) – 6:41
3. "Misled" (the groove mix) – 5:52
4. "Misled" (album version) – 3:30
5. "Misled" (MK's radio remix edit) – 3:49
6. "Misled" (Richie Jones club mix) – 7:22
7. "Misled" (MK's history mix) – 6:41
8. "Misled" (MK dub) – 8:56
9. "Misled" (Richie Jones dub) – 6:42
- 1995 UK cassette single
1. "Misled" – 3:30
2. "Je sais pas" – 4:34
- 1995 UK CD maxi-single
1. "Misled" – 3:30
2. "Je sais pas" – 4:34
3. "Where Does My Heart Beat Now" (live at the Olympia) – 4:59
4. "The Power of Love" (live at the Olympia) – 4:36
- 1995 UK remixes CD maxi-single
1. "Misled" (album version) – 3:30
2. "Misled" (E-Smoove's mission 7") – 4:07
3. "Misled" (E-Smoove's mission 12") – 8:36
4. "Misled" (E-Smoove's mission dub) – 9:10
5. "Misled" (MK club radio mix) – 4:08
6. "Misled" (MK club mix) – 6:41

== Charts ==
=== Weekly charts ===
Weekly chart performance
Chart (1994–1996)	Peak position
Australia (ARIA)	55
Canada Retail Singles (The Record)	7
Canada Contemporary Hit Radio (The Record)	2
Canada Dance Tracks (The Record)	6
Canada Pop Adult (The Record)	3
Canada Top Singles (RPM)	4
Canada Adult Contemporary (RPM)	2
Europe (Eurochart Hot 100)	44
Germany (GfK)	83
Lithuania (M-1)	37
New Zealand (Recorded Music NZ)	31
Quebec Radio Songs (ADISQ)	4
Scottish Singles Sales (Official Charts)	21
Spain (Top 40 Radio)	26
UK Singles (Official Charts)	15
UK Airplay (Music Week)	5
UK Club Chart (Music Week) 1994 remixes by MK and Richie Jones	25
UK Club Chart (Music Week) 1995 remixes by E-Smoove	32
US Billboard Hot 100	23
US Adult Contemporary (Billboard)	15
US Dance Club Songs (Billboard)	1
US Dance Singles Sales (Billboard)	20
US Pop Airplay (Billboard)	14
US Top 100 Pop Singles (Cash Box)	9

=== Year-end charts ===
Year-end chart performance
Chart (1994)	Position
Canada Top Singles (RPM)	31
Canada Adult Contemporary (RPM)	6
US Dance Club Play (Billboard)	30

=== All-time charts ===
All-time chart performance
Chart (1975–2000)	Position
Canada (Nielsen SoundScan)	25

== Release history ==
Region	Date	Format	Label	Ref.
United Kingdom	11 April 1994	7-inch vinyl; CD; cassette	Epic	
Japan	21 April 1994	CD	Epic/Sony	
Australia	2 May 1994	CD; cassette	Epic; 550 Music	
United States	17 May 1994	7-inch vinyl; 12-inch vinyl; CD; cassette	Epic; 550 Music	
United Kingdom (re-release)	20 November 1995	CD; cassette	Epic	

== See also ==
- List of Billboard number-one dance singles of 1994
