= Only One Road =

Single by Celine Dion

from the album The Colour of My Love
- B-side: "Calling You" (live)
- Released: 24 October 1994
- Studio: Cove City Sound (Glen Cove)
- Genre: Pop
- Length: 4:48
- Label: Columbia; Epic
- Songwriter: Peter Zizzo
- Producer: Ric Wake

Celine Dion singles chronology
"Think Twice" (1994)	"Only One Road" (1994)	"Calling You" (1994)

Music video
- "Only One Road" on YouTube

"Only One Road" is a song by Canadian singer Celine Dion, taken from her third English-language studio album, The Colour of My Love (1993). It was written by Peter Zizzo and produced by Ric Wake. "Only One Road" was issued as the album's fourth single by Columbia and Epic Records in October 1994 in North America, in May 1995 in the United Kingdom and Australia, and in July 1995 in selected European markets. The black and white music video, directed by Greg Masuak, premiered in 1995. "Only One Road" topped the Canadian Adult Contemporary Chart and reached the top ten in the United Kingdom and Ireland, peaking at number eight in both countries. It was later included on Dion's compilations The Collector's Series, Volume One (2000) and My Love: Ultimate Essential Collection (2008).

== Critical reception ==
Larry Flick from Billboard described "Only One Road" as "another glistening pop ballad" from Dion's "memorable" album, The Colour of My Love. He noted "her flawless soprano range [that] flexes admirably within this infectious and appropriately dramatic composition. It is difficult to imagine any pop or AC programmer with a penchant for gooey romance not putting this on the air instantly. Just lovely". Pip Ellwood-Hughes from Entertainment Focus called it "one of the album's finest moments", describing it as a classic ballad with "one of the best vocals on the record". He added that Dion's "power, strength and control" make the performance sound effortless.

Dennis Hunt from the LA Times compared Dion to singers such as Mariah Carey and Whitney Houston, pointing to "that grandiose, note-stretching finish" on the track. Pan-European magazine Music & Media wrote, "Think twice before you drop this one. But it's fair to say now that La Dion has become the 1990's Streisand, for whom singing big ballads was like brushing her teeth". Music Week awarded the single three out of five, stating, "How do you follow 'Think Twice'? With another show-stopping ballad, of course". The review added that the release "keeps up the Canadian songbird's profile and should whizz off those racks".

Jordan Paramor from Smash Hits also gave "Only One Road" three out of five, calling it "dead romantic" and praising Dion's vocal performance. Annika Heinle from The Stanford Daily described the song as a "tearjerker", writing that "it's all about memories, standing tall and Celine Dion's diva stage moves". Christopher Smith from TalkAboutPopMusic called it a "more restrained number, slower paced and more soulful", adding that it gives Dion "the chance to stretch her lungs over each and every chorus".

== Formats and track listing ==
- US cassette single
1. "Only One Road" (Humberto Gatica mix) – 4:48
2. "The Power of Love" (live) – 4:36
- European CD single and UK cassette single
1. "Only One Road" – 4:48
2. "Calling You" (live at the Olympia) – 4:04
- Australian cassette and CD single; European and UK CD maxi-single
1. "Only One Road" – 4:48
2. "L'amour existe encore" – 3:50
3. "Calling You" (live at the Olympia) – 4:04
- European and UK remixes CD maxi-single
1. "Only One Road" – 4:48
2. "Misled" (MK mix) – 6:41
3. "Love Can Move Mountains" (club mix) – 5:30
4. "Misled" (MK dub mix) – 7:57
- UK promotional CD single
1. "Only One Road" (radio edit) – 3:50
2. "Only One Road" (breakfast edit) – 3:00

== Charts ==
=== Weekly charts ===
Weekly chart performance
Chart (1994–1995)	Peak position
Australia (ARIA)	23
Belgium (Ultratop 50 Flanders)	17
Belgium (Ultratop 50 Wallonia)	19
Canada Top Singles (RPM)	15
Canada Adult Contemporary (RPM)	1
Canada Pop Adult (The Record)	5
Europe (Eurochart Hot 100)	27
Europe (European Hit Radio)	30
Iceland (Íslenski Listinn Topp 40)	11
Ireland (IRMA)	8
Israel (Israeli Singles Chart)	19
Lithuania (M-1)	34
Netherlands (Dutch Top 40 Tipparade)	4
Netherlands (Single Top 100)	40
Quebec Radio Songs (ADISQ)	14
Scandinavia (Airplay)	17
Scottish Singles Sales (Official Charts)	5
Spain (Top 40 Radio)	4
UK Singles (Official Charts)	8
UK Airplay (Music Week)	6
US Billboard Hot 100	93
US Adult Contemporary (Billboard)	27

=== Year-end charts ===
1994 year-end chart performance
Chart (1994)	Position
Canada Adult Contemporary (RPM)	85

1995 year-end chart performance
Chart (1995)	Position
Belgium (Ultratop 50 Flanders)	87
Belgium (Ultratop 50 Wallonia)	89
Canada Adult Contemporary (RPM)	68
UK Airplay (Music Week)	81

== Release history ==
Region	Date	Format(s)	Label(s)	Ref.
Canada	24 October 1994	Promotional	Columbia	
United States	24 October 1994	Promotional	Epic; 550 Music	
United States	21 November 1994	Cassette	Epic; 550 Music	
United Kingdom	8 May 1995	CD 1; cassette	Epic	
United Kingdom	15 May 1995	CD 2	Epic	
Australia	22 May 1995	CD; cassette	Epic; 550 Music	

== See also ==
- List of UK top-ten singles in 1995
