= Clive Griffin =

British soul vocalist

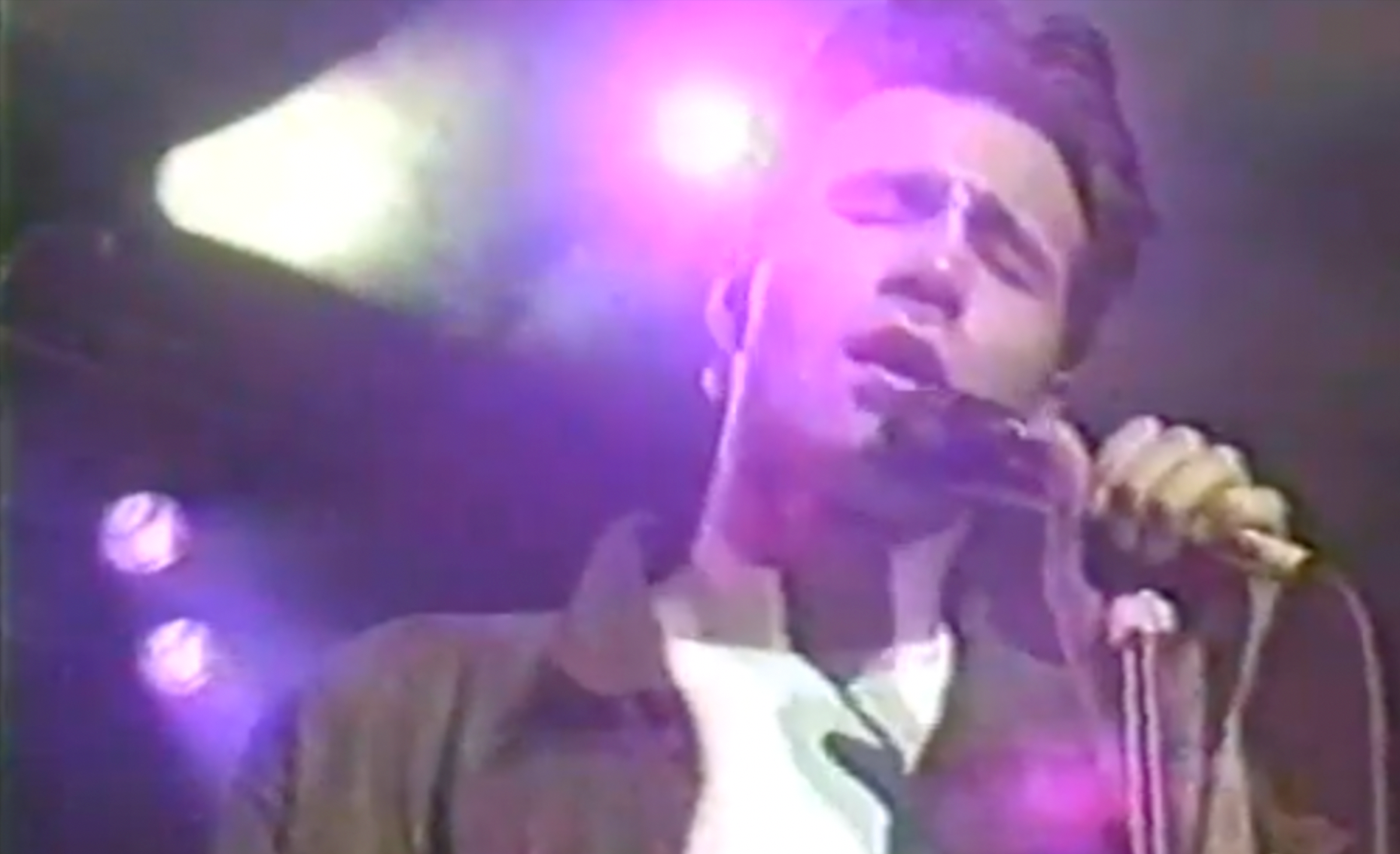
Clive Griffin live on stage in London 1989

Clive Griffin (born 30 December 1961) is a British soul vocalist, best known for his hit duet, "When I Fall in Love" (US No. 23) with Canadian singer Celine Dion.

Clive was discovered by producer/composer Richard Niles who got him a deal with Mercury Phonogram Records. Produced by Niles, the first album, "Step By Step", was composed of songs written by Niles and Griffin. The album sold 10,000 copies in his native UK in the late 1980s, and featured several singles, "Head Above Water", "Don't Make Me Wait", "The Way We Touch" and "Be There", which also featured James Ingram on backing vocals.

His second album Inside Out did not fare quite so well, with only "I'll Be Waiting" making any notable impact on the charts. "I'll Be Waiting" was number 74 on the 1991 year-end for the Italian singles chart, published by Musica e dischi. Thus ended his recording contract with Phonogram. Picking up the pieces, in 1992 the singer embarked on a tour with Eric Clapton, before signing a US record deal with Sony Records and releasing a self-titled album in 1993.

His third album contained the Diane Warren compositions "Commitment of the Heart" (US No. 96) and "We Don't Know How to Say Goodbye".

The album proved to be his last, and aside from a guest vocal on the Preluxe track "You're the One for Me", Griffin has only surfaced vocally on session work for other musicians, most notably Take That ("Never Forget") and Kylie Minogue ("Your Disco Needs You").

As a child, Griffin provided the vocal for the Cadbury Fudge jingle, "A finger of fudge is just enough", written by Mike d'Abo.

== Discography ==
=== Albums ===
- Step By Step (1989)
- Inside Out (1991) (ITA No. 45)
- Clive Griffin (1993)

=== Singles ===
Year	Single	Peak positions										Album
Year	Single	UK	AUS	GER	ITA	NED	NZ	US Hot 100	US Adult	US Main.	US Radio	Album
1988	"The Way We Touch"	129	—	—	—	—	—	—	—	—	—	Step By Step
1988	"Don't Make Me Wait"	99	—	—	—	—	—	—	—	—	—	Step By Step
1989	"Be There"	76	163	—	—	36	—	—	—	—	—	Step By Step
1989	"Head Above Water"	60	—	—	—	—	—	—	—	—	—	Step By Step
1991	"Reach for the Top"	80	—	—	32	—	—	—	—	—	—	Inside Out
1991	"I'll Be Waiting"	56	—	—	20	—	—	—	—	—	—	Inside Out
1993	"When I Fall in Love" (duet with Celine Dion)	—	93	—	—	37	22	23	6	40	28	Clive Griffin
1993	"Commitment of the Heart"	—	—	57	—	—	—	96	38	—	—	Clive Griffin
1994	"We Don't Know How to Say Goodbye"	—	—	—	—	—	—	—	—	—	—	Clive Griffin
1998	"You're the One for Me" (Preluxe featuring Clive Griffin)	90	—	—	—	—	—	—	—	—	—	single only
"—" denotes releases that did not chart or were not released.
