= Capitole de Québec =

Theatre in Quebec City, Quebec, Canada

Théâtre Capitole de Québec
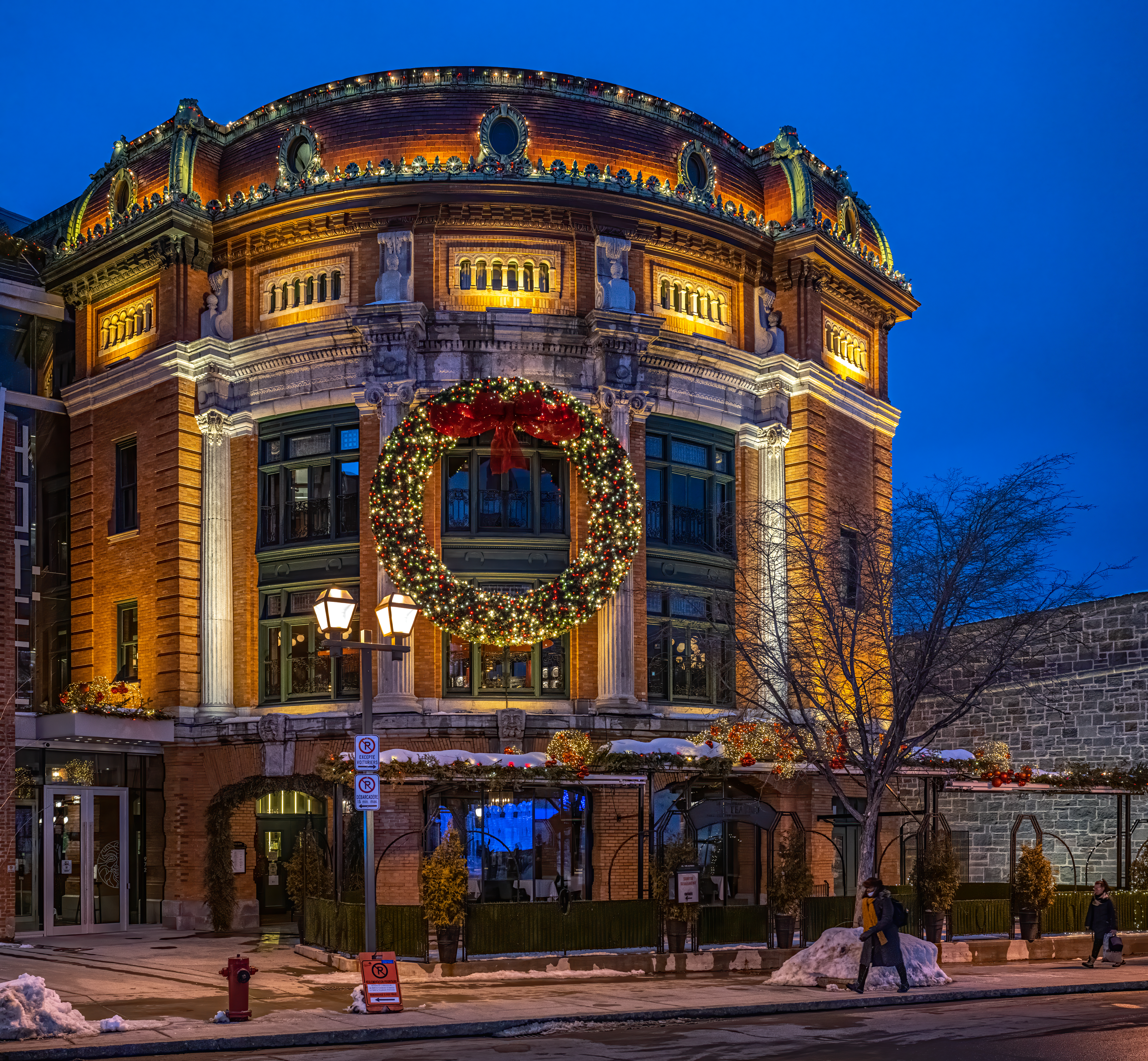
- Interactive map of Théâtre Capitole de Québec
- Address: 972, rue Saint-Jean
- Location: Quebec City, Quebec, Canada
- Coordinates: 46.81290°N 71.21390°W
- Capacity: 1,106
- Designation: National Historic Site of Canada

Construction
- Opened: 1903
- Architect: Walter S. Painter

Website
- Théâtre Capitole

The Capitole de Québec is a Beaux Arts-style theatre in Quebec City, Quebec, Canada. It is located in Old Quebec on Place d'Youville. It was listed on the Répertoire du patrimoine culturel du Québec in 1984, and became a National Historic Site of Canada in 1986.

== History ==
Constructed in 1903 based on plans by American architect Walter S. Painter, it was renovated in 1927 by Thomas W. Lamb. It was closed and abandoned in the late 1980s, and underwent a complete restoration in 1992.

Le Capitole was classified as a historic monument on May 3, 1984. It was designated as a National Historic Site of Canada on November 14, 1986.
