= When I Fall in Love =

Popular song by Victor Young and Edward Heyman

Single by Jeri Southern with Victor Young and His Orchestra
- Released: April 1952
- Genre: Traditional pop
- Length: 3:07
- Label: Decca
- Songwriters: Edward Heyman; Victor Young

Audio video
- "When I Fall In Love" on YouTube

"When I Fall in Love" is a popular song written by Victor Young (music) and Edward Heyman (lyrics). It was introduced in Howard Hughes' final film, One Minute to Zero, as an instrumental titled "Theme from One Minute to Zero". Jeri Southern recorded the first vocal version, released in April 1952, with Young handling the arrangement and conducting duties. The song went on to become a standard, recorded by many artists; the first hit version was sung by Doris Day and released in July 1952.

Day's recording was made on June 5, 1952. It was issued by Columbia Records as catalog number 39786, backed with "Take Me in Your Arms". The single reached number 20 on the Billboard pop chart. A 1993 duet version by Celine Dion and Clive Griffin, recorded for the film Sleepless in Seattle, brought the song renewed international attention and won the Grammy Award for Best Instrumental Arrangement Accompanying Vocalist(s) at the 36th Annual Grammy Awards. A 1996 recording by Natalie Cole, performed as a duet with her father Nat King Cole using vocals from his 1956 version, won two awards at the 39th Annual Grammy Awards: Best Pop Collaboration with Vocals and Best Instrumental Arrangement with Accompanying Vocal(s).

== Notable recordings ==
In the 1950s, several influential interpretations of "When I Fall in Love" appeared. The Miles Davis Quintet recorded the song on May 11, 1956, at the Rudy van Gelder Studio in Hackensack, New Jersey, with Davis on muted trumpet, Red Garland on piano, Paul Chambers on bass and Philly Joe Jones on drums; saxophonist John Coltrane did not participate in this session. The track was issued in July 1961 as the closing piece on Steamin' with the Miles Davis Quintet and later re‑packaged by Prestige Records in 1965 on the compilation Miles Plays for Lovers. Around the same time, Nat King Cole recorded his well‑known version on December 28, 1956. Released by Capitol Records on the album Love Is the Thing (catalog number SW824), it was also used as the recurring love theme in the 1957 film Istanbul, in which Cole performed it onscreen. Issued as a single in the UK in 1957, it reached number two on the UK Singles Chart, while a 1987 reissue peaked at number four. The opening of Cole's recording was later sampled in Pop Will Eat Itself's 1988 single "There Is No Love Between Us Anymore" from their album Box Frenzy. Since 2014, the track has been used in adverts for SSE. In 1959, Johnny Mathis included his rendition on the album Open Fire, Two Guitars.

During the early 1960s, the song continued to attract a wide range of performers. Blues singer Etta Jones released a version in 1960 that spent eight weeks on the Billboard Hot 100, peaking at number 65. Jazz trumpeter Blue Mitchell recorded an instrumental interpretation for his 1960 album Blue's Moods. In 1961, the Lettermen issued a successful single from their album A Song for Young Love that remained on the Billboard Hot 100 for 14 weeks, reaching number seven, and topping the Billboard Easy Listening chart. Veteran drummer Earl Palmer performed on this recording. In the 1970s, Donny Osmond recorded the song for his 1973 album A Time for Us. His version spent 13 weeks on the Billboard Hot 100, peaking at number 55, and achieved greater success internationally, reaching number four on the UK Singles Chart and number one in France.

The 1980s and 1990s brought further reinterpretations. In 1984, Linda Ronstadt released her version as the lead track on Lush Life and as a single, reaching number 24 on the Billboard Adult Contemporary chart. Natalie Cole recorded two distinct renditions: a contemporary R&B/smooth jazz version for her 1987 album Everlasting (number 14 US AC), and a traditional arrangement for her 1996 album Stardust as a virtual duet with her father, Nat King Cole, incorporating his 1956 vocals. The latter earned two awards at the 39th Grammy Awards: Best Pop Collaboration with Vocals and Best Instrumental Arrangement with Accompanying Vocal(s), awarded to arrangers Alan Broadbent and David Foster. In 1993, Van Morrison quoted the song extensively in his medley of "It's All in the Game" on the live album A Night in San Francisco. That same year, Anne Murray recorded her own version for the album Croonin'.

In the 21st century, the song has continued to appear in contemporary recordings. Michael Bublé included his interpretation on his 2018 album Love, releasing it as the album's first single on September 27, 2018.

== Rick Astley version ==
"When I Fall in Love"

Single by Rick Astley

from the album Whenever You Need Somebody
- A-side: "My Arms Keep Missing You"
- Released: November 30, 1987
- Recorded: 1987
- Genre: Traditional pop
- Length: 3:02
- Label: RCA
- Songwriters: Edward Heyman; Victor Young
- Producer: Stock Aitken Waterman

Rick Astley singles chronology
"Whenever You Need Somebody" (1987)	"When I Fall in Love" / "My Arms Keep Missing You" (1987)	"Together Forever" (1988)

Music video
- "When I Fall in Love" on YouTube

The version of "When I Fall in Love" by English singer‑songwriter Rick Astley from his album Whenever You Need Somebody was released on November 30, 1987, coinciding with the 30th anniversary of Nat King Cole's recording. The single is widely remembered for its close race for the UK Christmas number one. Rivals EMI, aiming to help the Pet Shop Boys reach number one with their cover of "Always on My Mind", re‑issued Cole's version of the song. This slowed sales of Astley's version, allowing Pet Shop Boys to claim the top spot. Despite selling over 250,000 copies and earning a silver certification from the BPI, Astley's single peaked at number two in the UK for two weeks. The re‑release of Cole's version reached number four. Issued as a double A‑side, the single also included "My Arms Keep Missing You", which became a hit in parts of Europe.

In 2019, Astley recorded and released a "reimagined" version of the song for his album The Best of Me, arranged for piano. On November 24, 2022, the original music video was remastered in 1080p HD for a limited edition 12‑inch double A‑side red vinyl release of the single "Love This Christmas".

=== Critical reception ===
A review in the Pan‑European magazine Music & Media described Astley's version as "surprisingly matching the original" and added: "With the romantic string arrangements and Astley's mature vocals, the perfect seasonal single, bound for a no. 1 in the UK". Reviewing the parent album, Music Week noted that Astley "stretches his vocal chords on a credible and reverent recreation" of Cole's song. In the same magazine, Jerry Smith considered it a potential hit despite "the cloying strings arrangement", adding that the cover was "not a patch" on Cole's original.

Chris Heath of Smash Hits praised the track as "brilliantly effective", noting Astley's crooning, which he felt sounded "uncannily like a 50 year old Frank Sinatra type". In another issue, Lola Borg called the song "truly splendid", writing that Astley "ably croons a slushy lump of woefulness" and noting that the arrangement closely mirrors the original, with "the sweeping strings ... exactly the same, note for note". In 2025, Thomas Edward of Smooth Radio ranked what he described as "a beautiful cover" at number six in his list of "Rick Astley's 10 greatest songs, ever".

=== Track listing ===
CD single

1. "When I Fall in Love" – 3:03
2. "My Arms Keep Missing You" (The No L mix) – 6:48
3. "My Arms Keep Missing You" (dub) – 4:58

7-inch single

1. "My Arms Keep Missing You" ("Where's Harry?" remix) – 3:14
2. "When I Fall in Love" – 3:03

12-inch maxi-single

1. "When I Fall in Love" – 3:00
2. "My Arms Keep Missing You" (dub) – 6:04
3. "My Arms Keep Missing You" (The No L mix) – 6:43

=== Charts ===
==== Weekly charts ====
Weekly chart performance
Chart (1987–1988)	Peak position
Australia (ARIA)	5
Austria (Ö3 Austria Top 40)	21
Belgium (Ultratop 50 Flanders)	1
Europe (Eurochart Hot 100)	7
Finland (Suomen virallinen lista)	7
Iceland (RÚV)	11
Ireland (IRMA)	2
Luxembourg (Radio Luxembourg)	1
Netherlands (Dutch Top 40)	4
Netherlands (Single Top 100)	3
New Zealand (Recorded Music NZ)	25
Sweden (Sverigetopplistan)	12
Switzerland (Schweizer Hitparade)	14
UK Singles (Official Charts)	2
West Germany (GfK)	6

==== Year-end charts ====
1987 year-end chart performance
Chart (1987)	Position
UK Singles (OCC)	50

1988 year-end chart performance
Chart (1988)	Position
Belgium (Ultratop 50 Flanders)	31

=== Certifications ===
Certifications
Region	Certification	Certified units/sales
United Kingdom (BPI)	Silver	250,000^{^}
^{^} Shipments figures based on certification alone.

== Celine Dion and Clive Griffin version ==
"When I Fall in Love"

Single by Celine Dion and Clive Griffin

from the album Sleepless in Seattle: Original Motion Picture Soundtrack and The Colour of My Love
- B-side: "If I Were You"
- Released: June 1993
- Studio: The Hit Factory (New York)
- Genre: Traditional pop
- Length: 4:20
- Label: Epic Soundtrax
- Songwriters: Edward Heyman; Victor Young
- Producer: David Foster

Celine Dion singles chronology
"Un garçon pas comme les autres (Ziggy)" (1993)	"When I Fall in Love" (1993)	"The Power of Love" (1993)

Clive Griffin singles chronology
"I'll Be Waiting" (1991)	"When I Fall in Love" (1993)	"We Don't Know How to Say Goodbye" (1994)

Music video
- "When I Fall in Love" on YouTube

The cover version of "When I Fall in Love" by Canadian singer Celine Dion and British singer Clive Griffin was used in the 1993 romantic comedy Sleepless in Seattle, starring Tom Hanks and Meg Ryan, and issued as a single in June that year. The song was recorded specifically for the soundtrack and was originally planned as a duet between Dion and Stevie Wonder but according to Dion, after hearing the demo performed by Warren Wiebe, she preferred to record it with Wiebe instead. It was nominated for a Grammy Award for Best Pop Performance by a Duo or Group with Vocal in 1994 and won the Grammy Award for Best Instrumental Arrangement Accompanying Vocalist(s), awarded to David Foster and Jeremy Lubbock at the 36th Annual Grammy Awards.

The song appears on both the Sleepless in Seattle soundtrack (which reached number one on the Billboard 200 and earned a four times platinum certification for selling over four million copies in the US) and later on Dion's album The Colour of My Love, released in November 1993.

The song was also included on the Japanese edition of Dion's compilation The Collector's Series, Volume One, released on October 23, 2000, on the greatest hits Complete Best, released on February 27, 2008, on the 3CD North American edition of the greatest hits My Love: Essential Collection, renamed "The Essential 3.0", released on August 29, 2011 and on the compilation The Best of Celine Dion & David Foster, released on October 19, 2012. The accompanying music video was directed by Dominic Orlando in Hollywood, Los Angeles.

=== Critical reception ===
AllMusic senior editor Stephen Thomas Erlewine remarked that Dion's album, The Colour of My Love, which includes the song, has "careful production, professional songwriting (highlighted by 'When I Fall in Love', 'The Power of Love', and 'Think Twice')". J.D. Considine from The Baltimore Sun wrote that "it's no accident that Celine Dion keeps recording all those movie-theme duets — she's got the perfect voice for wide-screen romance, all unbridled power and telegraphed emotion". He added that "she sounds great, demonstrating the kind of vocal confidence that originally made Whitney Houston a star". Larry Flick from Billboard felt that Dion "is at home within an arrangement of delicate rhythms and sweeping orchestration", while also noting that Griffin's voice "is a pure thrill". Christopher Smith of Talk About Pop Music wrote that the singers "do credible justice to Nat's signature tune as she remains in subdued and romantic mood for the entire length" of the track.

=== Commercial performance ===
"When I Fall in Love" reached the top 40 in several countries, including number 21 in Canada, number 22 in New Zealand, number 23 in the United States, and number 37 in the Netherlands. It was also successful on the Canadian Adult Contemporary chart and the US Hot Adult Contemporary Tracks, peaking at numbers two and six, respectively.

=== Live performances ===
Dion performed "When I Fall in Love" during her The Colour of My Love Tour, the Falling Into You: Around the World Tour, and the Millennium Concert in Montreal in 1999. In 1998, Anne Murray performed "When I Fall in Love" with Dion live and included the duet on her DVD An Intimate Evening with Anne Murray...Live. This version was later featured on Murray's 2007 album Anne Murray Duets: Friends & Legends.

=== Formats and track listing ===
- Australian and European CD; Japanese 3-inch CD; US 7-inch and cassette single
1. "When I Fall in Love" (Celine Dion and Clive Griffin) – 4:20
2. "If I Were You" (Celine Dion) – 5:07
- European CD maxi-single
1. "When I Fall in Love" (Celine Dion and Clive Griffin) – 4:20
2. "If You Asked Me To" (Celine Dion) – 3:55
3. "An Affair to Remember" (instrumental) – 2:30

=== Charts ===
==== Weekly charts ====
Weekly chart performance
Chart (1993–1994)	Peak position
Australia (ARIA)	93
Canada Top Singles (RPM)	21
Canada Adult Contemporary (RPM)	2
Canada Contemporary Hit Radio (The Record)	31
Netherlands (Single Top 100)	37
New Zealand (Recorded Music NZ)	22
Quebec Radio Songs (ADISQ)	11
US Billboard Hot 100	23
US Adult Contemporary (Billboard)	6
US Cash Box Top 100	20

==== Year-end charts ====
Year-end chart performance
Chart (1993)	Position
Canada Adult Contemporary (RPM)	24
US Adult Contemporary (Billboard)	28

=== Release history ===
Release history
Region	Date	Format	Label	Ref.
United States	June 1993	7-inch vinyl; cassette	Epic Soundtrax	
Australia	July 19, 1993	CD; cassette	Columbia	
Canada	August 1993	Promotional CD	Columbia	
Japan	October 21, 1993	3-inch CD	SMEJ	

== See also ==
- Grammy Award for Best Arrangement, Instrumental and Vocals
- List of Billboard Middle-Road Singles number ones of 1962
