= Say You'll Be There =

1996 single by the Spice Girls

Single by Spice Girls

from the album Spice
- B-side: "Take Me Home"
- Released: 26 September 1996
- Studio: Olympic (London)
- Genre: Dance-pop; R&B
- Length: 3:56
- Label: Virgin
- Songwriters: Spice Girls; Eliot Kennedy; Jon B.
- Producer: Absolute

Spice Girls singles chronology
| "Wannabe" (1996) | "Say You'll Be There" (1996) | "2 Become 1" (1996) |

Music video
- "Say You'll Be There" on YouTube

"Say You'll Be There" is a song by the English girl group Spice Girls from their debut studio album, Spice (1996). The Spice Girls co-wrote the song with Eliot Kennedy after the group left Heart Management in 1995. Later, Jonathan Buck also received a songwriting credit. Produced by production duo Absolute, the song incorporates a mix of dance-pop and R&B influences. It also includes a harmonica solo played by Judd Lander. Once considered by the group's record label Virgin Records to be the group's debut single, it was released as the second single from Spice on 26 September 1996.

The lyrics provide a female-first perspective on relationships. The song received mixed reviews from music critics, many of whom praised it for its catchiness, while others were critical of its production. It was a commercial success worldwide, reaching the top ten in most of the charts that it entered. The song became the Spice Girls' second number one in the United Kingdom. In the United States, it debuted at number five on the Billboard Hot 100, setting, at the time, a record for the highest entry by a British act on the chart; it later peaked at number three. It was certified double platinum by the British Phonographic Industry (BPI) in the United Kingdom, platinum in New Zealand, and was further certified gold in five other countries.

The accompanying music video was inspired by the films Faster, Pussycat! Kill! Kill! (1965) and Pulp Fiction (1994), and features the group as a band of female techno-warriors who use martial arts and high-tech ninja-influenced weapons to capture a hapless male. It includes symbols of male disempowerment, and serves as an example of solidarity and the group's bonding. It received positive reactions and was nominated for numerous awards including the 1996 Smash Hits Poll Winners Party, the 1997 MTV Video Music Awards, and the 1997 Brit Awards.

== Background ==
In March 1994, father-and-son team Bob and Chris Herbert, together with financer Chic Murphy, working under the business name of Heart Management, decided to create a girl group to compete with the boy bands that dominated the British pop music scene of the time. They placed an advertisement in The Stage, which asked the question: "Are you street smart, extrovert, ambitious, and able to sing and dance?" After receiving hundreds of replies, the management had narrowed their search to a group of five girls: Victoria Adams, Melanie Brown, Melanie Chisholm, Geri Halliwell, and Michelle Stephenson. The group moved to a house in Maidenhead and received the name Touch. Stephenson was eventually fired because she lacked the drive of the other group members. She was replaced by Emma Bunton. In November, the group—now named Spice—persuaded their managers to set up a showcase in front of industry writers, producers, and A&R men at the Nomis Studios in Shepherd's Bush, London, where they received an "overwhelmingly positive" reaction.

Due to the large interest in the group, the Herberts quickly set about creating a binding contract for them. Encouraged by the reaction they had received at the showcase, all five members delayed signing contracts on the legal advice from, amongst others, Victoria Adams' father, Anthony Adams. In late March 1995, because of the group's frustration at their management's unwillingness to listen to their visions and ideas, they parted from Heart Management. In order to ensure they kept control of their own work, the group retrieved the master recordings of their discography from the management offices. The next week they were supposed to meet with Sheffield-based songwriter and record producer Eliot Kennedy. Chris Herbert arranged the session weeks before the group's departure.

== Writing and recording ==
Without access to Herbert's address book, the only information the group had about Kennedy was that he lived in Sheffield. Brown and Halliwell drove there the day after their departure from Heart Management, then looked for a phone book in a service station, and called recording studios in the area, Eliot was the third Kennedy they called. That evening they went to his house and persuaded him to work with them, the rest of the group travelled to Sheffield the next day. Kennedy commented about the session:

None of them played instruments, so I was left to do the music and get that vibe together. What I said to them was, 'Look, I've got a chorus—check this out.' And I'd sing them the chorus and the melody—no lyrics or anything—and straight away five pads and pencils came out and they were throwing lines at us. Ten minutes later, the song was written. Then you go through and refine it. Then later, as you were recording it you might change a few things here and there. But pretty much it was a real quick process. They were confident in what they were doing, throwing it out there.

The group stayed at Kennedy's house for the most part of the week. He named his studio Spice, after the group, because it had never been used before. Together, they composed their first two songs without Heart Management, "Love Thing", and "Say You'll Be There". The girls met with artist manager Simon Fuller, who signed them with 19 Entertainment in May 1995. The group considered a variety of record labels, and signed a deal with Virgin Records in July. Paul Wilson and Andy Watkins—the songwriters and production duo known as Absolute—would later produce the song and recorded it at Olympic Studios in Barnes, London. Fuller then sent the song, to audio engineer Mark "Spike" Stent to be remixed.

In December 1996, while charting across Europe, "Say You'll Be There" became the focus of a controversy when Israeli soldier Idit Shechtman accused the group of copying her song Bo Elai (בוא אלי, "Come to Me"), an alleged similar song released in 1995 in Israel. Shechtman hired lawyers and threatened to sue. A spokesman of the group later declared: "Where there's a hit, there's a writ. There's always someone who crawls out of the woodwork claiming to have written a hit song. We look forward to seeing her in court."

The chorus of "Say You'll Be There" uses a highly similar melody to the song "What U R 2 Me", performed by R&B group After 7. American singer-songwriter Jonathan David Buck (Jon B.), wrote and produced the track for After 7's third album Reflections, released in July 1995. Buck was later added to the songwriting credits of the song in the group's Greatest Hits album, and the reissue of Girl Power! Live in Istanbul on DVD, both released in 2007. He is not credited in previous releases of the song, including the single and the Spice album.

== Composition and lyrics ==
"Say You'll Be There"
A 25-second sample of the song, featuring the group singing the chorus, with a backing track that mixes pop and R&B, followed by part of Judd Lander's harmonica solo during the bridge.

"Say You'll Be There" is a midtempo dance-pop song, with influences from R&B. It is written in the key of D♭ major, with a time signature set in common time, and moves at a moderate tempo of 108 beats per minute. The song is constructed in strophic form, using the sequence B♭m–E♭–G♭m–D♭ as its chord progression during the verses and the chorus. Musically, many critics noted the West Coast hip hop inspired synth-sounds, and the G-funk-infused production. The track incorporates sound effects from turntablism during the song's introduction and the verses. The verses are divided in two sections, the first one is sung in a declamatory-style by Bunton and Brown in the first verse and by Halliwell during the second verse. Adams sings the lyrical half of each verse with a "more seductive" and "breathy" vocal timbre. A bridge follows after the second chorus. It includes an instrumental interlude from a harmonica, which some critics compared it to the work of Stevie Wonder, and a two-bar rapped section. The song closes with a coda, which consists of the group singing the chorus repeatedly until the song gradually fades out, while Chisholm adds the ad libs between the other girls' harmonies. The unreleased demo version of the song features a rap in the bridge.

The instrumentation includes a drum kit with syncopated handclaps and a prominent synthesizer sound, sparse use of rhythm guitar and funk bass, string glissandos and a vibraphone. Production duo Absolute played all the instruments, except for the harmonica, which was played by Judd Lander, who also played it on Culture Club's "Karma Chameleon" (1983). The main melody and lyrical rhythm of the song is highly similar to After 7's song "What U R 2 Me". As a result, Jon B—the song's composer and producer, later received songwriting credits on "Say You'll be There".

The lyrics of the song, according to Brown, are about relationships—whether friendship or romantic—and to be there for each other. She commented, "you don't have to give them all the 'I love you' bit, because what's important is if you're there for each other". Chisholm commented that the inspiration for the song came from their own experiences as a group, and how they have been there for each other. According to musicologist Sheila Whiteley, the group presented an image that "exuded a brash confidence that was attractive to their teenage fans" and added that they made "an emphasis on stating where they come from and what they stand for". She commented that in the song's narrative, the Spice Girls opted for friendship over love, and the clear message is that "the relationship can be channelled and controlled by the girl". Author Juan de Ribera Berenguer, said that "love was a constant theme" in the group's songs, but added that "Say You'll Be There" holds a different approach to the subject, as it "highlights the female perspective". Tom Ewing from the e-zine Freaky Trigger, believed that "Say You'll be There" has a common theme with other pop songs, but pointed out the opening lines "Last time that we had this conversation / I decided we should be friends", as what sets it apart from their counterparts, as the song's main idea is that the choice is made by the female. Anna Louise Golden wrote in her book The Spice Girls, that the lyrics were another example of the group's Girl Power philosophy, as it mixed "interpersonal romance and personal strength".

== Release and promotion ==
Virgin Records planned a major campaign for the group's debut to promote them as their new high-profile act. Ashley Newton, the label's head of A&R and other executives preferred "Say You'll Be There" to be released as the first single, as they considered it a "much cooler" track than the group's choice, "Wannabe". Fuller agreed with the label, but the group was adamant with their decision and refused. After a period of indecision about the release, Fuller and the executives at Virgin relented, and "Wannabe" was chosen as their first single. Brown mentions in her autobiography that the group was also indecisive about the choice for the second single; as "Love Thing" was considered at one point to be released instead.

At the end of September 1996, "Say You'll Be There" was sent to British radio, and the accompanying music video added to the programming of MTV and The Box, while the Spice Girls were in Hong Kong doing a promotional tour in the Far East. At the beginning of October, the song started to receive intensive airplay across the UK, appearing on the playlists of 46 ILR stations—including Capital FM, and Radio 1' A-list. On 11 October 1996, the group performed the song on Top of the Pops and during the following week, did interviews and appeared on British television programmes that included The Chart Show, The Big Breakfast, The Noise, Live & Kicking, The O-Zone, Newsround, The Disney Club, After 5, WOW!, and GMTV.

The single was commercially released in the UK on 14 October 1996 in three single versions. The first one, a CD maxi single included the single mix of the track, a remix by record producer Junior Vasquez, an instrumental take, and the B-side "Take Me Home", written by the group with Absolute. The second version, released in a digipak, came with a signed poster and included the single mix, and three club remixes of the track produced by Vasquez, D Mob, and Linslee Campbell. The third version was a cassette single, featuring the single mix, the B-side "Take Me Home", and the Junior's Main Pass remix.

Following the physical release of the single, the group did a promotional tour across Europe for both, the song and their debut album Spice, set to be released at the beginning of November. During the last week of the month, they recorded two additional performances for Top of the Pops on 23 and 30 October, and visited France, Italy, Norway, and Sweden, where they did a series of interviews and appearances on television shows. The first week of November, the group did a televised performance in Germany, and a photo shoot for teen magazine Bravo. For the US release of the single, which occurred on 6 May 1997, the group did a week of promotion in North America. They made televised appearances on the Late Show with David Letterman, The Rosie O'Donnell Show and Live with Regis and Kathie Lee, and then traveled to Acapulco, Mexico, to perform on the television show Siempre en Domingo.

== Critical reception ==
The song received mixed reviews from music critics; many of whom praised "Say You'll Be There" for its catchiness, while others were critical of its production. Kristy Barker from Melody Maker named it Single of the Week, saying, "Less instant/insistent than 'Wannabe', 'Say You'll Be There' is nevertheless this year's Glorious Pop Rush Number Three, behind their debut and Livin' Joy's 'Don't Stop Movin''." Alan Jones from Music Week wrote, "After a tinkly cocktail bar piano intro, it moves through a Zapp-like phase right into Eternal territory. It's somewhat more sophisticated than 'Wannabe' and is likely to further their career, though some who liked the quirkiness of the first hit may pass." Dele Fadele of NME dubbed it as a "monstrously catchy tune", and lauded it as "state-of-the-art pop music for '96". Time magazine's Christopher John Farley was mixed on the track, although he called the song's groove "penetrating", he believed that it resembled too close to the work of Earth, Wind and Fire. Richmond Times-Dispatch critic Melissa Ruggieri, considered the song "a harmless, mid-tempo foot-tapper" that was made for Top 40 radio. Edna Gundersen of the USA Today dismissed the group's debut as "assembly-line dance-pop", but singled out "Say You'll Be There" as one of the album's highlights. The Atlanta Journal-Constitution writer Steve Dollar criticized the song, describing it as "pure confection more sugar really than spice", he also noted influences of Stevie Wonder in the harmonica solo. Greg Kot of the Chicago Tribune was unimpressed with their debut album, he considered the song's "G-funk synth" as simply part of "a compendium of slick secondhand urban pop". When comparing the song to "Wannabe", Billboard's critic Larry Flick thought it was as "immediately infectious" but "not nearly as silly and novelty-driven". Barry Walters of The Village Voice also compared the two songs. He found "Say You'll Be There" to be "even catchier" than "Wannabe". Reviewing the single, David Browne of Entertainment Weekly rated it a B+, describing the melody as "delectably frothy", but was at the same time confused by the song's lyrical content. Ken Tucker from the same publication, was more negative calling its P-Funk production "a bid for street cred".

Retrospective reviews from critics have been generally positive. Reviewing their debut album Spice, Stephen Thomas Erlewine from AllMusic was surprised at how the song's "sultry soul" was "more than just a guilty pleasure", while Brian Grosz from Albumism called it a "a great disco track". In a review of the group's 2007 compilation album Greatest Hits, NME said that it is a "fine song in any age". Alexis Petridis of The Guardian felt it was more polished than "Wannabe" and described the melody as "instantly memorable". The Evening Standard reviewer Jessie Thompson deemed the song as one of the group's best, praising the song's lyrical content and the harmonica solo. Writing for Billboard, Jason Lipshutz complimented the song's production, calling the hook "enormously catchy" and the instrumental arrangement "smart-but-simple". Anne T. Donahue of Vulture.com depicted it as "the perfect middle-ground" between the group's slower ballads and their upbeat singles, she added that "over 20 years later, we still remember the words to 'Say You'll Be There'". On a 2018 ranking of the group's songs, the NME writer El Hunt placed it at the top of the group's whole catalog, and characterized it as the "essence of everything that girl power stood for". Q magazine ranked "Say You'll Be There" at number 93 in their 2003 list of the "1001 Best Songs Ever". Time Out placed the song at number 39 on their 2015 list of "The 50 Best '90s Songs". Laura Richards felt that the song epitomized the group's musical style of blending pop with R&B, considering it "pure genius". On Billboard's 2017 list of the "100 Greatest Girl Group Songs of All Time", it ranked at number 25.

== Commercial performance ==
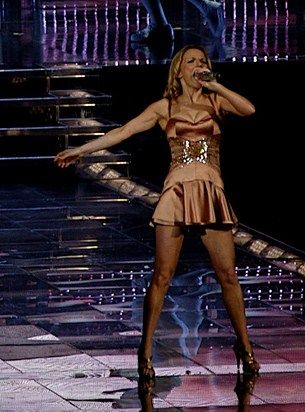
Geri Halliwell performing the song at the Air Canada Centre in Toronto, Canada, during the Return of the Spice Girls tour.

"Say You'll Be There" was released in the UK once the popularity of "Wannabe" began to fade. The high anticipation for their second single assured its commercial success. A week before the release, reports gave the single advanced sales of 334,000 copies—the highest Virgin Records had ever recorded for a single, while the song entered the top ten of the UK Airplay Chart. It debuted on the UK Singles Chart at number one, selling 349,000 copies. It was the group's first single to debut at number one, staying at the top position for two weeks, 12 weeks inside the top 40, and 17 weeks inside the top 75. By the end of October 1996, the single had sold 750,000 copies, receiving a double platinum certification from the British Phonographic Industry (BPI) for sales and streams exceeding 1,200,000 units in the UK as of June 2023.

"Say You'll Be There" was commercially successful in the rest of Europe. On 16 November 1996 it reached the top of the Eurochart Hot 100, remaining there for two weeks. It topped the singles chart in Finland, peaked inside the top ten in Austria, Belgium (both the Flemish and Walloon charts), Denmark, France, Ireland, the Netherlands, Norway, Spain, Sweden, and Switzerland, and the top 20 in Germany and Iceland. The song was also a radio hit across the continent, reaching the top position of the European Hit Radio Top 40 for six weeks, topping the airplay charts in the Benelux region, France, and Scandinavia, peaking inside the top five in the German-speaking countries, Hungary, and the UK, and inside the top 20 in Italy, Poland, and Spain. The song debuted on the Official New Zealand Music Chart at number two on 10 November 1996 (the same week "Wannabe" reached the top spot), stayed 10 weeks inside the top 10, and spent 23 weeks on the chart in total. In Australia, the single debuted in January 1997 on the ARIA Singles Chart at number 23, peaking 13 weeks later at number 12. It remained on the chart for five months, and was certified gold by the Australian Recording Industry Association (ARIA) for selling 35,000 units in 1997.

In March 1997, "Say You'll Be There" debuted on the Canadian RPM 100 Hit Tracks chart at number 90, reaching a peak of number five in its 12th week. It was ranked at number 35 position on the year-end chart. In the United States, the song started to receive airplay from 15 radio stations in March 1997, when "Wannabe" was topping the Billboard Hot 100. The song set a record on the Billboard Hot 100 when it debuted at number five on 24 May 1997, with sales of nearly 60,000 copies. At the time, this was the highest entry by a British act on the Hot 100. "Say You'll Be There" peaked at number three on the Hot 100 for three consecutive weeks. It ended 1997 at the number 28 on the year-end chart, selling 900,000 copies by December 1997, and was certified gold by the Recording Industry Association of America (RIAA). The song peaked at number two on the Top 40/Mainstream chart and had crossover success, reaching number three on the Top 40/Rhythm-Crossover chart and number nine on the Maxi-Singles Sales chart.

== Music video ==
The Spice Girls featured as a band of female techno-warriors, with the Mojave Desert as a background.

The music video for "Say You'll Be There" was directed by Vaughan Arnell, produced by Adam Saward and filmed on 7–8 September 1996, in the Mojave Desert, located in California. It was inspired by the films Pulp Fiction and Faster, Pussycat! Kill! Kill!, the latter in which led the girls to adopt fictional identities, an idea that Halliwell came up with. The video features the group as a band of female techno-warriors, who use martial arts and high-tech ninja influenced weapons to capture a hapless vegabond love interest (played by American model Tony Ward), who happens to appear in a Petty Blue Dodge Charger Daytona in leather pants, cowboy hat and open jacket who appears in bondage tied to the desert ground, with a ice cream man at the end appearing in a Chevrolet '62 Corvair Rampside pickup peculiarly dressed as in the vehicle's model same decade, in a striped shirt. The clip is presented as a narrative, with movie credits at the start introducing the Spice Girls as fantastic characters.

Chisholm played "Katrina Highkick", Halliwell's alter ego was "Trixie Firecracker", Bunton took on the role of "Kung Fu Candy", Adams played "Midnight Miss Suki" (wearing a black PVC catsuit which would attract the attention of her future husband, David Beckham), and "Blazin' Bad Zula" was Brown's alter ego. The shots of male bondage are unexplained, and function as symbols of male disempowerment, just as the rest of the clip serves to assert the power and fighting abilities of the women. At the end the group captures the ice cream man who appears in his pick-up truck, confused being carried off on the roof of the car as a trophy. An alternate version of the video exists that removes the male bondage scenes and replaces them with other shots of the girls.

The video won for Best Pop Video at the 1996 Smash Hits Poll Winners Party, for British Video of the Year at the 1997 Brit Awards, and was nominated for the Viewer's Choice at the 1997 MTV Video Music Awards. It won the Fan.tastic Video honour—given by online Billboard readers—at the 1997 Billboard Music Video Awards, and was also nominated for Best New Artist in a Video and Best Pop/Rock Clip. In January 1999, the music video was ranked number eight in VH1's "All-Time Greatest Music Videos in History".

== Live performances ==
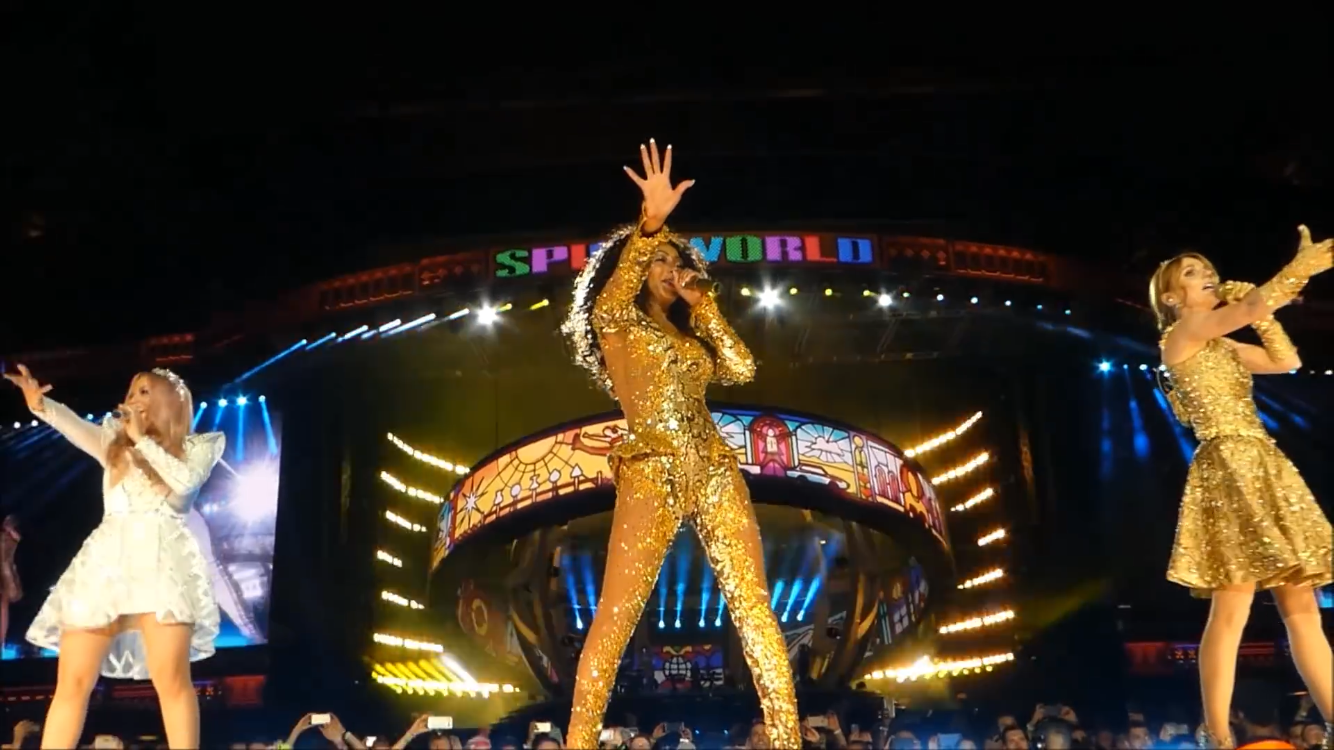
The Spice Girls performing the song at Wembley Stadium in London, during the Spice World – 2019 Tour, in outfits designed by Gabriella Slade.

The song was performed many times on television programmes, in both Europe and North America, such as Top of the Pops, Live & Kicking, The Noise, An Audience with..., MTV's The Grind, The Rosie O'Donnell Show, and MuchMusic's Intimate and Interactive. Their appearance at Saturday Night Live on 12 April 1997, was the first time "Say You'll Be There" was performed with a live band—their previous performances have all been either lip-synched or sung to a recorded backing track. The group have performed the song at the 1996 Smash Hits Poll Winners Party, the 1997 Prince's Trust Gala, the 1997 San Remo Festival, and the 1997 MTV Video Music Awards.

In October 1997, the group performed it as the fifth song of the Spice Girls' first live concert at the Abdi İpekçi Arena in Istanbul, Turkey. The performance was broadcast on Showtime in a pay-per-view event titled Spice Girls in Concert Wild!, and was later included in the VHS and DVD release Girl Power! Live in Istanbul. The Spice Girls performed the song in November 1997, as part of their setlist for the Two Nations in Concert charity event held in Johannesburg, South Africa, presented by the Nations Trust foundation. At the 2000 Brit Awards, the group performed "Say You'll Be There" at the end of the show as part of their setlist for winning the award for Outstanding Contribution to Music.

The Spice Girls have performed the song on their four tours, the Spiceworld Tour, the Christmas in Spiceworld Tour, the Return of the Spice Girls Tour, and the Spice World – 2019 Tour. For the Spiceworld Tour, during their performance of "Say You'll Be There", the group dressed in costumes with tailcoat shapes designed by British stylist Kenny Ho. They danced using walking sticks, in a segment inspired by Liza Minnelli's performance in the 1972 movie Cabaret. The performance at the Spiceworld Tour's final concert can be found on the video: Spice Girls Live at Wembley Stadium, filmed in London, on 20 September 1998, and released on VHS around two months later. For the Return of the Spice Girls Tour, it was performed as the third song from the show's opening segment. The group dressed in tight bronze and copper-coloured outfits made by Italian fashion designer Roberto Cavalli. For the Spice World – 2019 Tour, the group performed the song dressed in gold and silver outfits designed by Gabriella Slade.

== Legacy ==
Victoria Adams' appearance in her black PVC catsuit first attracted the attention of David Beckham; the pair would eventually marry in July 1999.

== Formats and track listings ==
- UK CD1; Australian, Brazilian, European, Japanese, South African, and Thai CD; digital EP 1
1. "Say You'll Be There" (single mix) – 3:56
2. "Take Me Home" – 4:07
3. "Say You'll Be There" (Junior's Main Pass) – 8:33
4. "Say You'll Be There" (instrumental) – 3:56
- UK CD2
1. "Say You'll Be There" (single mix) – 3:56
2. "Say You'll Be There" (Spice of Life Mix) – 7:01
3. "Say You'll Be There" (Linslee's extended mix) – 4:09
4. "Say You'll Be There" (Junior's Dub Girls) – 8:29
- European and French 2-track CD
1. "Say You'll Be There" (single mix) – 3:56
2. "Say You'll Be There" (Junior's Main Pass) – 8:33
- US CD
1. "Say You'll Be There" (single mix) – 3:56
2. "Take Me Home" – 4:07
- Digital EP 2 (Spice of Life Mix)
1. "Say You'll Be There" (Spice of Life Mix) – 7:01
2. "Say You'll Be There" (Linslee's extended mix) – 4:09
3. "Say You'll Be There" (Junior's Dub Girls) – 8:29
- Italian 12-inch

A1. "Say You'll Be There" (single mix) – 3:56
A2. "Say You'll Be There" (Junior Vasquez Dub Girls) – 8:29
B1. "Say You'll Be There" (Linslee's extended mix) – 4:09
B2. "Say You'll Be There" (Junior's X-Beats) – 8:30

- US 12-inch

A1. "Say You'll Be There" (single mix) – 3:56
A2. "Say You'll Be There" (Junior's Main Pass) – 8:33
A3. "Say You'll Be There" (Linslee's extended mix) – 4:09
B1. "Say You'll Be There" (Junior's Dub Girls) – 8:29
B2. "Say You'll Be There" (Junior's X-Beats) – 8:30

- UK and Australian cassette
1. "Say You'll Be There" (single mix) – 3:56
2. "Take Me Home" – 4:07
3. "Say You'll Be There" (Junior's Main Pass) – 8:33
- US cassette
1. "Say You'll Be There" (single mix) – 3:56
2. "Take Me Home" – 4:07

== Credits and personnel ==
Credits of "Say You'll Be There" adapted from the booklet of Spice:

- Spice Girls – lyrics, vocals
- Eliot Kennedy – lyrics
- Jon B. – lyrics
- Absolute – all instruments, production
- Judd Lander – harmonica
- Mark "Spike" Stent – audio mixing
- Jeremy Wheatley – recording engineer
- Adam Brown – assistant

Credits of the B-side and the remixes adapted from the liner notes of the "Say You'll Be There" CD singles UK CD1 and UK CD2:

"Take Me Home"

- Spice Girls – lyrics, vocals
- Absolute – lyrics, production, audio mixing

"Junior's Main Pass", "Junior's Dub Girls", and "Junior's X-Beats"

- Junior Vasquez – remixing, post-production
- Curt Frasca – audio mixing
- Joe Moskowitz – keyboards, programming

"Spice of Life Mix"

- Dancin' Danny D – remixing, additional production
- Roger King – programming
- Dave Burnham – recording engineer

"Linslee's Extended Mix"

- Linslee Campbell – remixing, additional production

== Charts ==
=== Weekly charts ===
Weekly chart performance for "Say You'll Be There"
| Chart (1996–1997) | Peak position |
|---|---|
| Australia (ARIA) | 12 |
| Austria (Ö3 Austria Top 40) | 7 |
| Belgium (Ultratop 50 Flanders) | 8 |
| Belgium (Ultratop 50 Wallonia) | 3 |
| Canada Top Singles (RPM) | 5 |
| Canada Adult Contemporary (RPM) | 29 |
| Denmark (Tracklisten) | 2 |
| Estonia Airplay (Eesti Top 25) | 9 |
| Europe (Eurochart Hot 100) | 1 |
| Europe (European Hit Radio) | 1 |
| Finland (Suomen virallinen lista) | 1 |
| France (SNEP) | 2 |
| France Airplay (Music & Media) (Note: In the four weeks following the issue of Music & Media with "Say You'll Be There"'s peak position on the French Airplay chart, 21 December 1996, no issue was published.) | 4 |
| Germany (GfK) | 16 |
| Iceland (Íslenski Listinn Topp 40) | 20 |
| Ireland (IRMA) | 2 |
| Israel (Israeli Singles Chart) | 5 |
| Italy (Musica e Dischi) | 23 |
| Italy Airplay (Music & Media) (Note: In the four weeks following the issue of Music & Media with "Say You'll Be There"'s peak position on the Italian airplay chart, 21 December 1996, no issue was published.) | 16 |
| Latvia (Latvijas Top 20) | 4 |
| Netherlands (Dutch Top 40) | 6 |
| Netherlands (Single Top 100) | 5 |
| New Zealand (Recorded Music NZ) | 2 |
| Norway (VG-lista) | 2 |
| Poland Airplay (Music & Media) | 7 |
| Scottish Singles Sales (Official Charts) | 1 |
| Spain (AFYVE) | 2 |
| Sweden (Sverigetopplistan) | 4 |
| Switzerland (Schweizer Hitparade) | 4 |
| UK Singles (Official Charts) | 1 |
| UK Airplay (Music & Media) | 3 |
| UK Airplay (Music Week) | 1 |
| UK Pop Tip Club Chart (Music Week) | 2 |
| US Billboard Hot 100 | 3 |
| US Adult Pop Airplay (Billboard) | 24 |
| US Dance Singles Sales (Billboard) | 9 |
| US Pop Airplay (Billboard) | 2 |
| US Rhythmic Airplay (Billboard) | 3 |

=== Year-end charts ===
1996 year-end chart performance for "Say You'll Be There"
| Chart (1996) | Position |
|---|---|
| Belgium (Ultratop 50 Flanders) | 89 |
| Belgium (Ultratop 50 Wallonia) | 29 |
| Europe (Eurochart Hot 100) | 36 |
| France (SNEP) | 44 |
| Netherlands (Dutch Top 40) | 62 |
| Netherlands (Single Top 100) | 64 |
| Norway (VG-lista) | 18 |
| Sweden (Topplistan) | 22 |
| UK Singles (OCC) | 4 |
| UK Airplay (Music Week) | 29 |
| UK Pop Tip Club Chart (Music Week) | 12 |

1997 year-end chart performance for "Say You'll Be There"
| Chart (1997) | Position |
|---|---|
| Australia (ARIA) | 45 |
| Brazil (Crowley) | 76 |
| Canada Top Singles (RPM) | 35 |
| Europe (Eurochart Hot 100) | 49 |
| France (SNEP) | 67 |
| US Billboard Hot 100 | 28 |
| US Rhythmic Top 40 (Billboard) | 28 |
| US Top 40/Mainstream (Billboard) | 18 |

== Certifications and sales ==
Certifications and sales for "Say You'll Be There"
| Region | Certification | Certified units/sales |
|---|---|---|
| Australia (ARIA) | Gold | 35,000^{^} |
| Belgium (BRMA) | Gold | 25,000^{*} |
| France (SNEP) | Gold | 250,000^{*} |
| New Zealand (RMNZ) | Gold | 15,000^{‡} |
| Norway (IFPI Norway) | Gold | |
| United Kingdom (BPI) | 2× Platinum | 1,200,000^{‡} |
| United States (RIAA) | Gold | 900,000 |
^{*} Sales figures based on certification alone.^{^} Shipments figures based on certification alone.^{‡} Sales+streaming figures based on certification alone.

== Release history ==
Release dates and formats for "Say You'll Be There"
| Region | Date | Format(s) | Label(s) | Ref. |
|---|---|---|---|---|
| Japan | 26 September 1996 | Maxi CD | Toshiba EMI | |
| Germany | 10 October 1996 | Maxi CD | EMI | |
| United Kingdom | 14 October 1996 | Cassette; two maxi CDs | Virgin | |
| France | 22 November 1996 | CD | EMI | |
| Australia | 13 January 1997 | Maxi CD | EMI | |
| United States | 8 April 1997 | Contemporary hit radio | Virgin | |
| United States | 6 May 1997 | CD | Virgin | |
