= List of European number-one hits of 1996 =

This is a list of the European Music & Media magazine's European Hot 100 Singles and European Top 100 Albums number-ones of 1996.

Issue date	Song	Artist	Album	Artist
6 January	"Gangsta's Paradise"	Coolio featuring L.V.	Made in Heaven	Queen
13 January	"Gangsta's Paradise"	Coolio featuring L.V.	Made in Heaven	Queen
20 January	"Earth Song"	Michael Jackson	Made in Heaven	Queen
27 January	"Gangsta's Paradise"	Coolio featuring L.V.	Made in Heaven	Queen
3 February	"Gangsta's Paradise"	Coolio featuring L.V.	Made in Heaven	Queen
10 February	"Gangsta's Paradise"	Coolio featuring L.V.	(What's the Story) Morning Glory?	Oasis
17 February	"Gangsta's Paradise"	Coolio featuring L.V.	(What's the Story) Morning Glory?	Oasis
24 February	"Spaceman"	Babylon Zoo	(What's the Story) Morning Glory?	Oasis
2 March	"Spaceman"	Babylon Zoo	(What's the Story) Morning Glory?	Oasis
9 March	"Spaceman"	Babylon Zoo	(What's the Story) Morning Glory?	Oasis
16 March	"Spaceman"	Babylon Zoo	(What's the Story) Morning Glory?	Oasis
23 March	"Children"	Robert Miles	(What's the Story) Morning Glory?	Oasis
30 March	"Children"	Robert Miles	Mercury Falling	Sting
6 April	"Children"	Robert Miles	Mercury Falling	Sting
13 April	"Children"	Robert Miles	Falling Into You	Celine Dion
20 April	"Children"	Robert Miles	Greatest Hits	Take That
27 April	"Children"	Robert Miles	Greatest Hits	Take That
4 May	"Children"	Robert Miles	Greatest Hits	Take That
11 May	"Children"	Robert Miles	Greatest Hits	Take That
18 May	"Children"	Robert Miles	To the Faithful Departed	The Cranberries
25 May	"Children"	Robert Miles	To the Faithful Departed	The Cranberries
1 June	"Children"	Robert Miles	Older	George Michael
8 June	"Children"	Robert Miles	Older	George Michael
15 June	"Children"	Robert Miles	Older	George Michael
22 June	"Macarena (Bayside Boys Mix)"	Los Del Rio	Older	George Michael
29 June	"Macarena (Bayside Boys Mix)"	Los Del Rio	Load	Metallica
6 July	"Macarena (Bayside Boys Mix)"	Los Del Rio	Load	Metallica
13 July	"Macarena (Bayside Boys Mix)"	Los Del Rio	Load	Metallica
20 July	"Killing Me Softly"	Fugees	Load	Metallica
27 July	"Killing Me Softly"	Fugees	The Score	Fugees
3 August	"Killing Me Softly"	Fugees	The Score	Fugees
10 August	"Killing Me Softly"	Fugees	The Score	Fugees
17 August	"Killing Me Softly"	Fugees	The Score	Fugees
24 August	"Killing Me Softly"	Fugees	The Score	Fugees
31 August	"Killing Me Softly"	Fugees	Jagged Little Pill	Alanis Morissette
7 September	"Killing Me Softly"	Fugees	Jagged Little Pill	Alanis Morissette
14 September	"Wannabe"	Spice Girls	Jagged Little Pill	Alanis Morissette
21 September	"Wannabe"	Spice Girls	Jagged Little Pill	Alanis Morissette
28 September	"Wannabe"	Spice Girls	New Adventures in Hi-Fi	R.E.M.
5 October	"Wannabe"	Spice Girls	New Adventures in Hi-Fi	R.E.M.
12 October	"Wannabe"	Spice Girls	New Adventures in Hi-Fi	R.E.M.
19 October	"Wannabe"	Spice Girls	New Adventures in Hi-Fi	R.E.M.
26 October	"Wannabe"	Spice Girls	New Adventures in Hi-Fi	R.E.M.
2 November	"Wannabe"	Spice Girls	Greatest Hits	Simply Red
9 November	"Wannabe"	Spice Girls	Dance Into the Light	Phil Collins
16 November	"Say You'll Be There"	Spice Girls	Dance Into the Light	Phil Collins
23 November	"Say You'll Be There"	Spice Girls	Dance Into the Light	Phil Collins
30 November	"Quit Playing Games (With My Heart)"	Backstreet Boys	Greatest Hits	Simply Red
7 December	"Breathe"	The Prodigy	Spice	Spice Girls
14 December	"Breathe"	The Prodigy	Spice	Spice Girls
21 December	"Breathe"	The Prodigy	Spice	Spice Girls
28 December	"One & One"	Robert Miles featuring Maria Nayler	Spice	Spice Girls
