= Wannabe =

1996 single by the Spice Girls

- British CD single cover art

Single by Spice Girls

from the album Spice
- B-side: "Bumper to Bumper"
- Released: 26 June 1996
- Recorded: December 1995
- Studio: Strongroom (London, England)
- Genre: Dance-pop; pop rap
- Length: 2:54
- Label: Virgin
- Songwriters: Spice Girls; Matt Rowe; Richard Stannard
- Producers: Matt Rowe; Richard Stannard

Spice Girls singles chronology
"Wannabe" (1996)	"Say You'll Be There" (1996)

Music video
- "Wannabe" on YouTube

"Wannabe" is the debut single by the British girl group the Spice Girls, released on 26 June 1996. It was written by the Spice Girls, Matt Rowe and Richard "Biff" Stannard and produced by Rowe and Stannard for the group's debut album, Spice. The song was originally mixed by Dave Way, but the group was not pleased with the result, and the recording was instead mixed by Mark "Spike" Stent. A dance-pop song, its lyrics address the value of female friendship over romantic relationships. It has since become a symbol of female empowerment and the most emblematic song of the group's girl power philosophy.

"Wannabe" was heavily promoted. Its music video, directed by Johan Camitz, became a success on the British cable network the Box, which sparked press interest in the group. Subsequently, the song had intensive radio airplay across England, while the Spice Girls performed it on television and began doing interviews and photo shoots for teen magazines. Responding to the wave of interest, Virgin released the song as the Spice Girls' debut single in Japan in June 1996 and in the UK the following month, well ahead of the planned release of the Spice album. It was released to radio in the United States in January 1997.

"Wannabe" earned mixed reviews from critics, but won for Best Selling British-Written Single at the 1997 Ivor Novello Awards and for British Single of the Year at the 1997 Brit Awards. It topped the UK Singles Chart for seven weeks and received a quintuple platinum certification by the British Phonographic Industry (BPI). By the end of 1996, "Wannabe" had topped the charts in 22 nations—including the Billboard Hot 100—and by the end of 1997, it topped the charts in 37. It became the best-selling single by a girl group, and, in a 2014 study, was found to be the most recognisable pop song of the last 60 years among young English speakers. An EP, Wannabe 25, was released in 2021 for the single's 25th anniversary.

== Background ==
In March 1994, father-and-son team Bob and Chris Herbert, together with financer Chic Murphy, working under the business name of Heart Management, placed an advertisement in The Stage, which asked the question: "Are you street smart, extrovert, ambitious, and able to sing and dance?" After receiving hundreds of replies, the management had narrowed their search to a group of five girls: Victoria Adams, Melanie Brown, Melanie Chisholm, Geri Halliwell, and Michelle Stephenson. The group moved to a house in Maidenhead and received the name "Touch". Stephenson was eventually fired because she lacked the drive of the other group members. She was replaced by Emma Bunton. In November, the group—now named "Spice"—persuaded their managers to set up a showcase in front of industry writers, producers, and A&R men at the Nomis Studios in Shepherd's Bush, London. Producer Richard Stannard, at the studio for a meeting with pop star Jason Donovan, attended the showcase after hearing Brown, as she went charging across the corridor. Stannard recalled:

More than anything, they just made me laugh. I couldn't believe I'd walked into this situation. You didn't care if they were in time with the dance steps or whether one was overweight or one wasn't as good as the others. It was something more. It just made you feel happy. Like great pop records.

Stannard stayed behind after the showcase to talk to the group. He then reported to his songwriter partner, Matt Rowe, that he had found "the pop group of their dreams". Chris Herbert booked the group's first professional songwriting session with the producers at the Strongroom in Curtain Road, East London, in January 1995. Rowe recalls feelings similar to Stannard's: "I love them. Immediately. ... They were like no one I'd met before, really." The session was productive; Stannard and Rowe discussed the songwriting process with the group and talked about what the group wanted to do on the record. In her autobiography, Brown recalls that the duo instinctively understood their point of view and knew how to incorporate "the spirit of five loud girls into great pop music".

== Writing ==
The first song the Spice Girls wrote with Stannard and Rowe was called "Feed Your Love", a slow and soulful song that was recorded and mastered for the group's debut album; the song was not used because it was considered too sexually explicit for the target audience. The group next proposed to write a track with an uptempo dance-pop rhythm. Rowe set up a drum loop on his MPC3000 drum machine. Its fast rhythm reminded Stannard of Grease. Stannard commented that the only pre-planned concept for the song was that it should represent the essence of what they were. The group then added their own contributions to the song, Rowe recalls:

They made all these different bits up, not thinking in terms of verse, chorus, bridge or what was going to go where, just coming up with all these sections of chanting, rapping and singing, which we recorded all higgledy-piggledy. And then we just sewed it together. It was rather like the way we'd been working on the dance remixes we'd been doing before. Kind of a cut-and-paste method.

"Wannabe" was completed in 30 minutes—mainly because the group had written and composed parts of the song beforehand—in what Brown describes as a "sudden creative frenzy". During the session, Brown and Bunton came up with the idea of including a rap near the end of the song. At this point the group became highly motivated, and incorporated the word "zigazig-ah" into the lyrics. Chisholm told Billboard: "You know when you're in a gang and you're having a laugh and you make up silly words? Well we were having a giggle and we made up this silly word, zigazig-ah. We were in the studio and it all came together in this song."

== Recording and production ==
While most of the other songs on the Spice album required two or three days of studio time, "Wannabe" was recorded in less than an hour. The solo parts were divided between Brown, Bunton, Chisholm, and Halliwell. Adams missed most of the writing session and communicated with the rest of the group on a mobile phone. In her autobiography, she wrote: "I just couldn't bear not being there. Because whatever they said about how it didn't matter, it did matter. Saying 'Yes, I like that' or 'Not sure about that' down the phone is not the same." She contributed backing vocals and sings during the chorus. Rowe stayed up all night working on the song, and it was finished by morning. The only later addition was the sound of Brown's footsteps as she ran to the microphone.

The group parted with Heart Management in March 1995 because of their frustration with the management company's unwillingness to listen to their visions and ideas. The girls met with artist manager Simon Fuller, who signed them with 19 Entertainment. The group considered a variety of record labels, and signed a deal with Virgin Records in July. The original mix of "Wannabe" was considered lacklustre by Virgin executives. Ashley Newton, who was in charge of A&R, sent the song to American producer Dave Way for remixing; the result was not what the group had hoped to achieve. As Halliwell later described it, "the result was bloody awful". She elaborated in her second autobiography, Just for the Record: "Right at the beginning of the Spice Girls, ... Ashley Newton had tried to turn us into an R&B group ... He brought us jungle versions and hip-hop mixes and I hated them all. Although Mel B was a big fan of R&B, she agreed with me that these versions just didn't work so we exercised our Spice veto!" Fuller gave the song to audio engineer Mark "Spike" Stent, who thought that it was a "weird pop record". Stent remixed it in six hours, in what he described as "tightening it up" and "getting the vocals sounding really good."

== Composition ==
"Wannabe" (1996)
A 26-second sample from "Wannabe", featuring Brown and Halliwell singing the refrain in a call and response interaction, the use of the word "zigazig-ah", and the group singing the song's first chorus.

"Wannabe" is a dance-pop song with influences of hip-hop and rap. It is written in the key of B major and is set in the time signature of common time, moving at a moderate tempo of 110 beats per minute. It uses the sequence B–D–E–A–A♯ as a bass line during the refrain, the chorus, and the bridge, and uses a chord progression of F♯–G♯m–E–B for the verses. The song is constructed in a verse-pre-chorus-chorus form, with a rapped bridge before the third and final chorus. Musically, it is "energised" by a highly syncopated synthesised riff, and by the way the repetitive lyrics and rhythm are highlighted during the bridge. "Wannabe" presents a different version of the traditional pop love song performed by females; its energetic, self-assertive style expresses a confident independence that is not reliant on the male figure for its continuance.

The song opens with Halliwell's laugh, followed by "undislodgeable piano notes" inspired by the Grease "Summer Nights" bassline. The first lines of the refrain are rapped in a call and response interaction between Brown and Halliwell. The words "tell", "really" and "I wanna" are repeated, so that the vocal tone and lyrics build up an image of female self-assertion. The refrain ends with the word "zigazig-ah", which musicologist Sheila Whiteley compared to the neologisms created by Lewis Carroll; other writers have considered it a euphemism for female sexual desire, which is ambiguously sexualised or broadly economic. The first verse follows; Chisholm, Bunton, Brown, and Halliwell sing one line individually, in that order. In this part, the lyrics have a pragmatic sense of control of the situation; they begin, "If you want my future, forget my past." This, according to Whiteley, taps directly into the emotions of the young teenage audience. The only member without a solo verse was Adams.

During the chorus, the lyrics—"If you wanna be my lover/You gotta get with my friends"—address the value of female friendship over romantic relationships, while the ascending group of chords and the number of voices creates a sense of power that adds to the song's level of excitement. The same pattern occurs, leading to the second chorus. Towards the end, Brown and Halliwell rap the bridge, which serves as a presentation to each of the girls' personalities. The group repeats the chorus for the last time, ending the song with energetic refrains— "Slam your body down and wind it all around"—and the word "zigazig-ah".

== Release and promotion ==
"Wannabe" was either a hit or a miss, love or hate. It would either do everything or nothing. We felt, well, if nobody likes it then we have got other songs up our sleeves, but that was the one we wanted to release.

— Geri Halliwell on the song's release.

After signing the group, Virgin Records launched a major campaign for their debut song to promote them as the new high-profile act. There was a period of indecision about what song would be released as the first single; the label wanted to get everything right for the campaign, because the all-girl group format was untested. The group, led by Brown and Halliwell, was adamant that the debut song should be "Wannabe", they felt it served as an introduction to their personalities and the Girl Power statement. Virgin's executives believed that the first single should either be "Say You'll Be There", which they considered a much "cooler" track, or "Love Thing". At the beginning of 1996 the impasse between the group and their record label about the release of the single was temporarily solved. In March, Fuller announced that he agreed with Virgin in that "Wannabe" should not be the first single. The label wanted a song that appealed to the mainstream market, and nothing considered too radical. Halliwell was shocked and furious; she told Fuller, "It's not negotiable as far as we're concerned. 'Wannabe' is our first single." Fuller and the executives at Virgin relented, and the song was chosen as their first single.

The trigger for the Spice Girls' launch was the release of the "Wannabe" music video in May 1996. Its quick success on the British cable network The Box sparked press interest, despite initial resistance to the all-girl group idea. The same month, their first music press interviews appeared in Music Week, Top of the Pops, and Smash Hits, and their first live TV slot was broadcast on LWT's Surprise Surprise. A month after the video's release, the song was receiving intensive airplay on the main radio stations across the UK, while the group started to appear on television—mainly on kid's programmes such as Live & Kicking—and doing interviews and photo shoots for teen magazines. A full-page advertisement appeared in the July issue of Smash Hits, saying: "Wanted: Anyone with a sense of fun, freedom and adventure. Hold tight, get ready! Girl Power is comin' at you". The group appeared on the television programme This Morning with Richard and Judy, and performed at their first Radio One road show in Birmingham.

"Wannabe" was first released in Japan on 26 June 1996 as a maxi CD. In the United Kingdom, the song was issued on 8 July 1996 in two single versions. The first one, released in two formats—a standard CD single and a cassette single—include the radio edit of the track, the Motiv 8 vocal slam remix, and the B-side, "Bumper to Bumper". The group wrote "Bumper to Bumper" with Paul Wilson and Andy Watkins—the songwriter-production duo known as Absolute—and British singer-songwriter Cathy Dennis. The second version, released on maxi single format on 15 July, feature the radio edit, an instrumental version, the Motiv 8 dub slam remix, and the Dave Way alternative mix. This version came with a fold-out postcard inlay and a stickered case.

During the weeks following the UK release, the group began promotional visits abroad. They did three trips to Japan and brief visits to Germany and the Netherlands. On a trip to the Far East, they visited Hong Kong, Thailand, and South Korea. In January 1997 they travelled to North America to do a promotional campaign that Phil Quartararo, president of Virgin Records America, described as "absolutely massive". In Canada, the group did interviews for newspapers and radio stations, appeared in television programmes such as Hit List, and MusiquePlus, and attended an autograph signing at Montreal's HMV Megastore. During their visit to the US, the group met with influential radio programmers, TV networks, and magazines. In addition, the music video was placed into heavy rotation by MTV.

== Critical reception ==
=== UK reviews ===
"Wannabe" received mixed reviews from UK music critics. Paul Gorman of Music Week called the group "smart, witty, abrasive and downright fun". He described the song as a "R&B-lite debut single", and noted influences from Neneh Cherry in it. In a review conducted by the British pop band Deuce for Smash Hits magazine, the group described "Wannabe" as "limp", "awful", and "not strong enough for a debut single." Kate Thornton, editor of Top of the Pops magazine, commented that the all-girl group idea was "not going to happen;" she considered it too threatening. In her review for The Guardian, Caroline Sullivan called it a combination of "cute hip pop and a vaguely feminist lyric", she was also surprised that "considering the slightness of 'Wannabe,'" the group had an overwhelming amount of offers from record companies.

NME characterised the song as "a combined force of Bananarama, Betty Boo and Shampoo rolled into one." Dele Fadele of the same magazine called the rap during the song's bridge "annoying", and added, writing of the group's music: "It's not good. It's not clever. But it's fun." The magazine named "Wannabe" the worst single of the year at the 1997 NME Awards. Conversely, it won for Best Single at the 1997 BRIT Awards, and for International Hit of the Year and Best Selling British-Written Single at the 1997 Ivor Novello Awards presented by the British Academy of Composers and Songwriters. The song was ranked number five by Melody Maker in their list of "Singles of the Year" in December 1996. VH1 ranked it number 33 in their "100 Greatest Songs of the 90s", while NME ranked it number 111 on their 2011 list of "150 Best Tracks of the Past 15 Years".

=== US reviews ===
In the United States, reaction to the song was also mixed. In a review of the group's debut album, Edna Gundersen of USA Today said that "Wannabe" is "a melodious but disposable tune that typifies this debut's tart bubblegum and packaged sexiness." Greg Kot of the Chicago Tribune called it "insidiously snappy, ... [that] is shaping up as this year's 'Macarena.'" Karla Peterson of The San Diego Union-Tribune said that "'Wannabe' has UGH written all over it," adding that it was "relentlessly catchy and horrifyingly hummable". The Buffalo News's Anthony Violanti called it "irresistible". Sarah Rodman of The Boston Globe described it as a "maniacally zippy single", and Stephanie Zacharek of Salon referred to it as an "unapologetically sassy dance hit". Melissa Ruggieri of the Richmond Times-Dispatch commented that "based on their efficacious American debut single, ... the Spice Girls might be expected to deliver more of that zingy pop on their debut album," but she felt that "aside from 'Wannabe,' the album's dance tracks are color-by-numbers bland." Larry Flick of Billboard magazine said that "fans of the more edgy girl-group ... may find this single too fluffy" but added that "everyone else with a love of tasty pop hooks, lyrical positivity, and jaunty rhythms is going to be humming this single for months to come."

Some reviewers noticed the combination of musical genres. Christina Kelly from Rolling Stone magazine criticised the group's image, and added that their songs, including "Wannabe", were "a watered-down mix of hip-hop and cheesy pop balladry, brought together by a manager with a marketing concept." Matt Diehl of Entertainment Weekly said that it was "more a compendium of music styles (from ABBA-style choruses to unconvincing hip-hop) than an actual song," and Sara Scribner of the Los Angeles Times described it as "a bubblegum hip-hop confection of rapping lifted off Neneh Cherry and Monie Love albums." Charles Aaron of Spin magazine called it "a quickie, mid-'80s teen paperback come to life ... so gooey it melts in your hands, not in your mouth" (an apparent reference to the M&M's slogan "melts in your mouth, not in your hands"). The song ranked at 15th in the American Pazz & Jop, a nationwide critics poll published by The Village Voice and conducted by its music editor Robert Christgau, who called it "a classic".

=== Retrospective reviews ===
Retrospective reviews of "Wannabe" are mostly positive. Stephen Thomas Erlewine of AllMusic said that "none of the girls have great voices, but they do exude personality and charisma, which is what drives bouncy dance-pop like 'Wannabe,' with its ridiculous 'zig-a-zig-ahhh' hook, into pure pop guilty pleasure." Dan Cairns of The Sunday Times said that the song "leaves a bad taste in the mouth: [because] the true legacy of Girl Power is, arguably, a preteen clothing industry selling crop tops and other minimal garments to young girls," but added that it "remains the same two minutes and 53 seconds of pop perfection that it ever was." In a review of their Greatest Hits album, IGN said that after ten years it "still sound reasonably fresh", while Digital Spy's Nick Levine said that "Wannabe" still remained an "exuberant calling card". Billboard named the song #5 on their list of 100 Greatest Girl Group Songs of All Time and the Best Pop Song of 1997.

== Chart performance ==
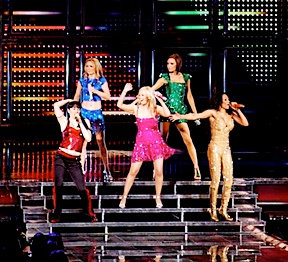
The Spice Girls performing "Wannabe" at the Air Canada Centre in Toronto, Canada, during the Return of the Spice Girls tour

As part of Virgin's strategy to make the group an international act, "Wannabe" was released in Japan and Southeast Asia two weeks before its British release. After the song was placed into heavy rotation on FM stations in Japan, the Spice Girls made promotional tours in May, July, and September 1996. The group received major press and TV exposure, appearing in programmes such as Space Shower. The single was released by Toshiba EMI on 26 June 1996, and sold 100,000 copies by October 1996.

"Wannabe" debuted on the UK Singles Chart at number three, six days after its physical release, with sales of 73,000 copies. It climbed to number one the next week, and spent seven weeks at the top, the second-longest stay by an all-female group, only behind Shakespears Sister's "Stay". With 18 weeks in the top forty and 26 weeks in the top 75, it became the second-biggest selling single of the year, and as of November 2012, it has sold over 1.38 million copies, the biggest-selling single by a female group in the UK.

"Wannabe" was commercially successful in the rest of Europe. On 4 September 1996 the song reached the top of the Eurochart Hot 100, where it stayed for nine consecutive weeks, when it was replaced by the group's second single, "Say You'll Be There". "Wannabe" topped the singles charts in Belgium (both the Flemish and French charts), Denmark, Finland, France, Germany, Hungary, Ireland, the Netherlands, Norway, Spain, Sweden, and Switzerland, and peaked inside the top five in Austria, the Czech Republic, and Italy. The song was a success in Oceania. In Australia, it debuted at number 64, reached the top of the ARIA Singles Chart for 11 weeks, and ended at number five on the 1996 year-end chart. In New Zealand, it debuted on 1 September 1996 at number 38, reaching the top position 10 weeks later. It spent one week at the top and 17 consecutive weeks inside the top ten. "Wannabe" also topped the singles charts in Hong Kong and Israel.

In Canada, it debuted at the 89th position of the RPM 100 Hit Tracks chart on the week beginning 16 December 1996, a full month before it hit the US charts. It peaked at nine in its eighth week, and ended at number 68 on the year-end chart. The song performed better on the dance chart, where it reached the top for three weeks, and ended at the top of the year-end chart. In the US, the song debuted on the Billboard Hot 100 on 25 January 1997 at number 11, the highest-ever debut by a British act at the time. It reached the top of the chart in its fifth week, and stayed there for four consecutive weeks simultaneously with the group's fourth single ("Mama" / "Who Do You Think You Are") being at number one in the UK. "Wannabe" sold over 1.8 million copies in the US as of January 1998. It peaked at four on the Top 40/Mainstream chart and was a crossover success, topping the Top 40/Rhythm-Crossover chart, peaking at number 20 on the Hot Dance Club Play chart and at nine on the Hot Dance Singles Sales chart. New remixes of the song were produced in 2007 in conjunction with the release of their Greatest Hits CD and these rose to number 15 on the Billboard dance chart. "Wannabe" also remains the best selling song by a female group in the United States with 2,910,000 physical singles and downloads combined, according to Nielsen SoundScan in 2014.

== Music video ==
=== Background ===
The Spice Girls create mischief at an eccentric bohemian party at the Midland Grand Hotel in St Pancras, London.

The music video for "Wannabe" was the first for Swedish director Johan Camitz. Camitz was hired on Fuller's recommendation because of his commercials for Volkswagen, Diesel, and Nike. His original concept for the video was a one-take shoot of the group arriving at an exotic building in Barcelona, taking over the place, and running riot—the same way they did when they were looking for a manager and a record company. A few days before the shoot on 19 April 1996, Camitz was unable to get permission to use the building, and the shoot was relocated to the St. Pancras Renaissance London Hotel (Midland Grand Hotel) in St Pancras, London.

The video features the Spice Girls running, singing, dancing, and creating mischief at an eccentric bohemian party. Because the video was intended to be filmed in one shot, the group rehearsed the routine several times through the night, while a Steadicam operator followed them. The final video was cut together from two takes. Halliwell wrote: "The video I remember as being very chaotic and cold. It wasn't very controlled—we didn't want it to be. We wanted the camera to capture the madness of the Spice Girls." Virgin's executives were horrified; Newtown recalled that "the girls were freezing cold, which showed itself in various different ways". The video was banned in some parts of Asia because of Brown's erect nipples. The lighting was considered too dark; the best takes showed the girls bumping with the furniture and looking behind them. Virgin was concerned that old people appeared in the video, and worried that the scenes of the Spice Girls jumping on a table and Halliwell's showgirl outfit might be considered threatening by music channels. Virgin began discussions about a re-shoot or creating an alternate one for the US, but the Spice Girls refused. The video premiered in the U.S. in January 1997 on MTV, getting immediate airplay.

According to Melanie C's memoir Who I Am, the video cost £130k to make.

=== Reception ===
When the music video first appeared on the British cable network the Box, it was selected so frequently that it reached the top of the viewers' chart within two hours. It stayed at number one for 13 weeks until it was replaced by the Spice Girls' next music video, for "Say You'll Be There". At its peak, up to 15 per cent of the 250,000 weekly telephone requests to the Box were for "Wannabe", and it was aired up to 70 times a week, becoming the most requested track in the channel's history. "Wannabe" won Best Dance Video at the 1997 MTV Video Music Awards, and Best Video at the 1997 Comet Media Awards. It was also nominated for Best British Video at the 1997 BRIT Awards and was ranked at number forty-one in the 100 Greatest Pop Videos of all time by Channel 4.

In 2015, Billboard included the video for "Wannabe" in their list of the Top Ten Most Iconic Girl Group Music Videos of All Time, noting: "They were basically unknown to U.S. audiences when the video for debut single 'Wannabe' -- a riotous, one-shot stroll through the Girls gleefully messing up some posh U.K. soiree -- premiered, but by the end of the four-minute clip, we knew absolutely everything we needed to know about the Spice Girls. You get the individual personalities of all five members, the infectious togetherness of the group at large, and most importantly, the sense that they were coming to absolutely blast through American pop music and mess up everything we previously thought we knew."

To coincide with the Spice25 release on 29 October 2021, the Spice Girls released a lyric video for "Wannabe", set inside the Midland Grand Hotel.

== Live performances ==
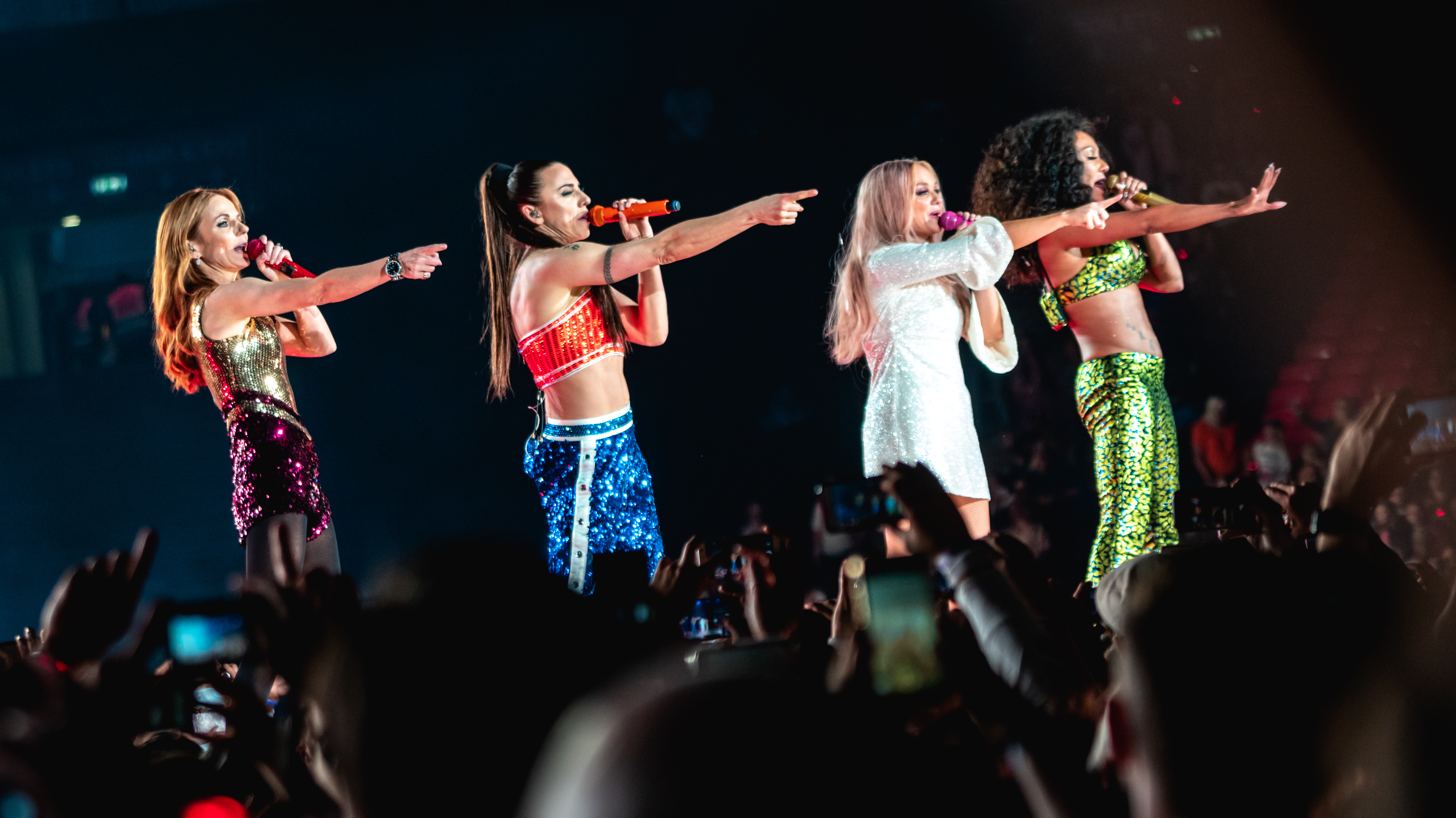
The Spice Girls performing "Wannabe" on the final night of their Spice World - 2019 Tour at the Wembley Stadium in London. Their outfits were recreations based from the originals from the music video

The Spice Girls were in Japan when "Wannabe" went to number one in the UK. The group made their first appearance on Top of the Pops by satellite link from Tokyo, where they used a local temple as a backdrop for their mimed performance. They performed the song several more times on the show, including the programme's 1996 Christmas special. It was performed many times on television, in both Europe and the US, including An Audience with..., the Bravo Supershow, Sorpresa¡ Sorpresa!, Fully Booked, Live with Regis and Kathie Lee, The Oprah Winfrey Show, and Saturday Night Live. The performance at Saturday Night Live on 12 April 1997 was featured in the 5-part TV musical special "SNL: 25 Years of Music", and was the first time the group ever performed "Wannabe" with a live band—their previous performances had all been either lip-synched or sung to a recorded backing track.

The group performed it at awards ceremonies such as the 1996 Smash Hits! Awards, the 1996 Irish Music Awards, the 1997 BRIT Awards, and the 1997 Channel V Music Awards held in New Delhi, where they wore Indian costumes and entered the stage in auto rickshaws. In October 1997 the group performed "Wannabe" as the last song of their first live concert at the Abdi İpekçi Arena in Istanbul, Turkey. The performance was broadcast on Showtime in a pay-per-view event titled Spice Girls in Concert Wild!, and was later included in the VHS and DVD release Girl Power! Live in Istanbul.

The Spice Girls have performed the song on their four tours, the Spiceworld Tour, the Christmas in Spiceworld Tour, the Return of the Spice Girls Tour and the Spice World - 2019 Tour. After a breast-cancer scare led Geri Halliwell to leave the team at the end of the European leg of the Spiceworld Tour, her parts were replaced by Melanie Chisholm (refrain), Victoria Adams (verses), and Bunton (bridge). The performance at the tour's final concert can be found on the video Spice Girls Live at Wembley Stadium, filmed in London, on 20 September 1998. The group performed the song on 12 August 2012 at the 2012 Summer Olympics closing ceremony in London as part of a medley with the song "Spice Up Your Life". It was also performed as the closing song on the Spice World - 2019 Tour.

== Legacy ==
As the Spice Girls' debut single, "Wannabe" has been credited for catapulting the band to global stardom and ushering in "Spicemania" in the late 1990s. Commentators have noted that the song and its accompanying video, both now considered modern pop classics, served as a wonderful introduction to the band. The Metro's Jon O’Brien concluded that: "From its lyrical themes of female solidarity to its insanely catchy pop hooks and mischief-making promo, the worldwide chart-topper encapsulated everything that made the group so spellbinding in the space of just two minutes and 52 seconds." Digital Spy's Lewis Corner agreed, adding: "It's hard to imagine any other pop act managing to make this much of an impact so quickly and effortlessly ever again."

"Wannabe" has also been credited with changing the mid-1990s pop music landscape, pioneering the teen pop boom of the late 1990s and early 2000s. Robert Copsey, editor at the UK's Official Charts Company explained: "There was nothing else quite like Wannabe on the radio back in summer 1996. Rock and dance music had been dominating the airwaves and charts for quite some time by that point. The Spice Girls struck at just the right moment with Wannabe; a gutsy, enthusiastic and unashamed pop song we'd all been craving without even realising it."

"Wannabe" has been hailed as an "iconic girl power anthem". In 2016, the United Nations' Global Goals "#WhatIReallyReallyWant" campaign filmed a global remake of the original music video to highlight gender inequality issues faced by women across the world. The video, which was launched on YouTube and ran in movie theatres internationally, featured British girl group M.O, Canadian "viral sensation" Taylor Hatala, Nigerian-British singer Seyi Shay and Bollywood actress Jacqueline Fernandez lip-syncing to the song in various locations around the world, including a set of stairs reminiscent of the Midland Grand Hotel steps from the original music video. The campaign also encouraged people from all over the world to use the hashtag "#WhatIReallyReallyWant", taken from the song's lyrics, to share what they wanted for girls and women by 2030. In response to the campaign, Beckham said, "How fabulous is it that after 20 years the legacy of the Spice Girls’ girl power is being used to encourage and empower a whole new generation?"

In 2014, a study at the University of Amsterdam with the Museum of Science and Industry in Manchester found that "Wannabe" is the most recognisable and catchy pop song of the last 60 years among young English speakers. The study found that "Wannabe"’s simple and relentless melody was the key to its success, with lead musicologist Dr John Ashley Burgoyne concluding, "I would describe the song as truly relentlessly catchy. It's not that it has this one hook per se. It's quite ingeniously composed." On Spotify, "Wannabe" was the most streamed 1990s song by a female group or artist in 2020.

An EP, Wannabe 25, was released on 9 July 2021 to mark the 25th anniversary of "Wannabe". The EP included the previously unreleased demos of "Wannabe" and "Feed Your Love".

On 31 December 2023, "Wannabe" reached 1 billion streams on Spotify. Spice Girls became the first British girl group to reach the milestone and the second girl group overall, along with Fifth Harmony's "Work from Home".

== Cover versions ==
Cover versions of "Wannabe" have been included in the albums of various musical artists. In 1998 American retro-satirist duo the Lounge-O-Leers did a kitschy, lounge-inspired rendition of "Wannabe" for their debut album, Experiment in Terror. British intelligent dance music producer μ-Ziq recorded a cover for his fourth album, Lunatic Harness. The London Double Bass Sound recorded an instrumental version in 1999, a dance remix was recorded by Jan Stevens, Denise Nejame, and Sybersound for the 1997 album Sybersound Dance Mixes, Vol. 2, while an electronic version was recorded by the Street Girls for the 2005 album The World of Hits of the 80's. In 1999 the song was used in "Weird Al" Yankovic's polka medley, "Polka Power!", for his tenth album, Running with Scissors. Covers of the song in a punk style include a thrash parody version by British punk rock band Snuff for their 1998 EP, Schminkie Minkie Pinkie, a punk rock version by Dutch band Heideroosjes for their 1999 album, Schizo, and a pop-punk cover by Zebrahead for their 2004 EP, Waste of MFZB. In 2013, Brazilian funk carioca singers MC Mayara, MC Mercenária, MC Baby Liss and DZ MC released a version of the song, called "Mereço Muito Mais" (en: "I Deserve More"), and a music video inspired by the original. The 2019 single "Spicy", by Diplo, Herve Pagez and Charli XCX, is a reworking of "Wannabe".

"Wannabe" has also been covered in live concert sets by numerous musical artists, including Australian duo the Veronicas, American rock band the Foo Fighters, Filipina superstar Regine Velasquez and American pop rock band DNCE. K-pop girl group Girls' Generation covered the song on the popular South Korean radio program Super Junior Kiss the Radio in 2009 and did a live performance of the song on the South Korean television music program Kim Jung-eun's Chocolate in 2010. In 2013, American girl group Fifth Harmony dressed up as the Spice Girls for Halloween and performed "Wannabe" at their New York show. The performance was also uploaded on their official YouTube channel. In April 2017, indie punk band the Tuts recorded and filmed a music video for their cover of "Wannabe".

"Wannabe" has also been performed by the characters of various films. The cover versions of the song were included in the official soundtracks of Disney's 2005 animated film Chicken Little, DreamWorks Animation's 2012 animated film Madagascar 3: Europe's Most Wanted and the 2004 American teen film Sleepover.

"Wannabe" has also been covered in numerous TV shows. The characters Brittany (Heather Morris), Tina (Jenna Ushkowitz), Marley (Melissa Benoist), Kitty (Becca Tobin) and Unique (Alex Newell) dressed up as the Spice Girls and performed the song on the 17th episode of the fourth season of Glee. In 2015, the song was sung by Ed Helms and the Muppets in the fourth episode of the first season of The Muppets TV series. The song was also performed by Peter Griffin in the Family Guy episode "The New Adventures of Old Tom", and used in the ITV2 TV adverts for the programme's 14th season. The cast of Netflix's Fuller House also performed the song in the season one finale "Love Is in the Air". "Wannabe" was performed, along with another Spice Girls song, "Say You'll Be There", with revised lyrics, in the second episode of the 41st season of Saturday Night Live by host Amy Schumer and cast members Cecily Strong and Taran Killam. "Wannabe" has also been used in three episodes of Fox animated series The Simpsons; the song was sung by Homer Simpson in the episodes "Maximum Homerdrive" and "Fraudcast News", and sung by Ralph Wiggum in the episode "How the Test Was Won". The 2007 season four finale of One Tree Hill featured the female characters dancing as a group to the song. It was also used in the trailer for the film Excess Baggage (1997). On 3 October 2012, Geri Halliwell performed the song as a solo during a breast-cancer care show. (She had resigned from Spice Girls as a result of a breast-cancer scare, as noted above.) Her solo version was an acoustic ballad with several lyrics changed, such as "you've gotta get with my friends" being changed to "you've gotta be my best friend".

In 2016, American actress Eva Longoria performed a comedic dramatic reading of "Wannabe" in honour of the 20th anniversary of the album Spice. For the 21st anniversary of the song in July 2017, W magazine had various celebrities perform "Wannabe", including Nicole Kidman, James Franco, Riz Ahmed, Milo Ventimiglia, Millie Bobby Brown and Keri Russell.

== Formats and track listings ==
- UK CD1; Australian CD; Brazilian CD; European CD; Japanese CD
1. "Wannabe" (Single Edit) – 2:52
2. "Bumper to Bumper" – 3:43
3. "Wannabe" (Vocal Slam) – 6:20
- UK CD2
1. "Wannabe" (Single Edit) – 2:52
2. "Wannabe" (Dave Way Alternative Mix) – 3:27
3. "Wannabe" (Dub Slam) – 6:25
4. "Wannabe" (Instrumental) – 2:52
- European 2-track CD; US CD
1. "Wannabe" (Single Edit) – 2:52
2. "Bumper to Bumper" – 3:43
- UK and Australian cassette
1. "Wannabe" (Single Edit) – 2:52
2. "Bumper to Bumper" – 3:43
3. "Wannabe" (Vocal Slam) – 6:20
- European 12-inch vinyl single
1. A1 "Wannabe" (Vocal Slam) – 6:20
2. B1 "Wannabe" (Dub Slam) – 6:25
3. B2 "Wannabe" (Instrumental Slam) – 6:20
- US 12-inch vinyl single
1. A1: "Wannabe" (Junior Vasquez 12-inch Club Mix) – 9:20
2. A2: "Wannabe" (Vocal Slam) – 6:20
3. B1: "Wannabe" (Junior Vasquez Club Dub) – 9:20
4. B2: "Wannabe" (Dub Slam) – 6:25
5. B3: "Wannabe" (Single Edit) – 2:52
- Digital EP
1. "Wannabe" (Single Edit) – 2:54
2. "Bumper to Bumper" – 3:42
3. "Wannabe" (Motiv 8 Dubslam Mix) – 6:25
4. "Wannabe" (Motiv 8 Vocal Slam Mix) – 6:21
5. "Wannabe" (Dave Way Alternative Mix) – 3:25
6. "Wannabe" (Instrumental) – 2:52
- Wannabe 25 EP
1. "Wannabe" – 2:56
2. "Wannabe" (Junior Vasquez Remix Edit) – 5:57
3. "Wannabe" (Demo) – 2:58
4. "Feed Your Love" – 5:13

== Credits and personnel ==
- Spice Girls – lyrics, vocals
- Matt Rowe – lyrics, producer, keyboards and programming
- Richard Stannard – lyrics, producer, keyboards and programming
- Mark "Spike" Stent – audio mixing
- Adrian Bushby – recording engineer
- Patrick McGovern – assistant

Published by Windswept Pacific Music Ltd and PolyGram Music Publishing Ltd.

== Charts ==
=== Weekly charts ===
Initial chart performance
Chart (1996–1997)	Peak position
Australia (ARIA)	1
Austria (Ö3 Austria Top 40)	2
Belgium (Ultratop 50 Flanders)	1
Belgium (Ultratop 50 Wallonia)	1
Canada Top Singles (RPM)	9
Canada Dance/Urban (RPM)	1
Czech Republic (ČNS IFPI)	2
Denmark (Tracklisten)	1
Estonia (Eesti Top 20)	1
Europe (European Hot 100 Singles)	1
Finland (Suomen virallinen lista)	1
France (SNEP)	1
Germany (GfK)	1
Hong Kong (IFPI)	1
Hungary (Mahasz)	1
Hungary Airplay (HCRA)	1
Iceland (Íslenski Listinn Topp 40)	9
Ireland (IFPI)	1
Israel (IFPI)	1
Italy (FIMI)	3
Italy Airplay (Music & Media)	2
Japan (Oricon)	50
Latvia (Latvijas Top 20)	1
Mexico (Notitas Musicales)	1
Netherlands (Dutch Top 40)	1
Netherlands (Single Top 100)	1
New Zealand (Recorded Music NZ)	1
Norway (VG-lista)	1
Scottish Singles Sales (Official Charts)	1
Spain (AFYVE)	1
Sweden (Sverigetopplistan)	1
Switzerland (Schweizer Hitparade)	1
Taiwan (IFPI)	10
UK Singles (Official Charts)	1
UK Airplay (Music Week)	3
UK Pop Tip Club Chart (Music Week) with "2 Become 1"	1
US Billboard Hot 100	1
US Adult Pop Airplay (Billboard)	27
US Pop Airplay (Billboard)	4
US Rhythmic Airplay (Billboard)	1
Zimbabwe (ZIMA)	1

2008 weekly chart performance
Chart (2008)	Peak position
US Dance Club Songs (Billboard)	15

2012 Weekly chart performance
Chart (2012)	Peak position
Japan Hot 100 (Billboard)	73

2021 weekly chart performance
Chart (2021)	Peak position
UK Downloads	34
UK Vinyl Singles	1

2025 weekly chart performance
Chart (2025)	Peak position
Poland (Polish Airplay Top 100)	67

=== Year-end charts ===
Year-end chart performance
Chart (1996)	Position
Australia (ARIA)	5
Austria (Ö3 Austria Top 40)	19
Belgium (Ultratop 50 Flanders)	12
Belgium (Ultratop 50 Wallonia)	11
Europe (European Hit Radio)	7
Europe (Eurochart Hot 100)	6
France (SNEP)	6
Germany (Media Control)	10
Iceland (Íslenski Listinn Topp 40)	63
Latvia (Latvijas Airplay Chart 1996)	1
Netherlands (Dutch Top 40)	10
Netherlands (Mega Single Top 100)	11
New Zealand (RIANZ)	15
Norway (VG-lista)	9
Sweden (Topplistan)	10
Switzerland (Schweizer Hitparade)	18
UK Singles (OCC)	2
UK Airplay (Music Week)	41
UK Pop Tip Club Chart (Music Week) with "2 Become 1"	48

Chart (1997)	Position
Australia (ARIA)	61
Brazil (Crowley)	19
Canada Top Singles (RPM)	68
Canada Dance/Urban (RPM)	1
US Billboard Hot 100	10
US Rhythmic Top 40 (Billboard)	12
US Top 40/Mainstream (Billboard)	16

=== Decade-end charts ===
Decade-end chart performance
Chart (1990–1999)	Position
US Billboard Hot 100	35

=== All-time charts ===
All-time chart performance
Chart	Position
UK Singles (OCC)	40

== Certifications ==
Certifications and sales for "Wannabe"
Region	Certification	Certified units/sales
Australia (ARIA)	2× Platinum	140,000^{^}
Belgium (BRMA)	Gold	25,000^{*}
Denmark (IFPI Danmark)	Gold	45,000^{‡}
France (SNEP)	Diamond	750,000^{*}
Germany (BVMI)	Platinum	500,000^{‡}
Italy (FIMI) (since 2010)	Platinum	50,000^{‡}
Japan (RIAJ) Full-length ringtone	Gold	100,000^{*}
Netherlands (NVPI)	Gold	50,000^{^}
New Zealand (RMNZ)	4× Platinum	120,000^{‡}
Norway (IFPI Norway)	Platinum	
Spain (Promusicae)	Platinum	60,000^{‡}
Sweden (GLF)	Gold	15,000^{^}
Switzerland (IFPI Switzerland)	Gold	25,000^{^}
United Kingdom (BPI)	5× Platinum	3,032,623
United States (RIAA)	Platinum	2,910,000
^{*} Sales figures based on certification alone.^{^} Shipments figures based on certification alone.^{‡} Sales+streaming figures based on certification alone.

== Release history ==
Release dates and formats for "Wannabe"
Region	Version	Date	Format(s)	Label(s)	Ref.
Japan	"Wannabe"	26 June 1996	Maxi CD	Toshiba EMI	
France	"Wannabe"	1 July 1996	CD; maxi CD	EMI	
Germany	"Wannabe"	1 July 1996	CD; maxi CD	EMI	
United Kingdom	"Wannabe"	8 July 1996	Cassette; CD	Virgin	
United Kingdom	"Wannabe"	15 July 1996	Maxi CD	Virgin	
Australia	"Wannabe"	19 August 1996	Cassette; maxi CD	EMI	
United States	"Wannabe"	7 January 1997	12-inch vinyl; cassette; CD	Virgin	
Various	Wannabe 25 (EP)	9 July 2021	Digital download; streaming	UM^{e}; Virgin	
Various	Wannabe 25 (EP)	27 August 2021	12-inch vinyl; cassette	UM^{e}; Virgin	

== Bibliography ==
- Beckham, Victoria (2001). Learning to Fly. Penguin Books Ltd. ISBN 0-14-100394-4.
- Blake, Andrew (1999). Living Through Pop. Routledge. ISBN 0-415-16199-1.
- Bloustien, Gerry (1999). Musical Visions. Wakefield Press. ISBN 1-86254-500-6.
- Bronson, Fred (2003). The Billboard Book of Number 1 Hits (5th ed.). Billboard Books. ISBN 0-8230-7677-6.
- Brown, Melanie (2002). Catch a Fire: The Autobiography. Headline Book Publishing. ISBN 0-7553-1063-2.
- Cripps, Rebecca; Peachey, Mal; Spice Girls (1997). Real Life: Real Spice The Official Story. Zone/Chameleon Books. ISBN 0-233-99299-5.
- De Ribera Berenguer, Juan (1997). Colección: Ídolos del Pop-Spice Girls (in Spanish). Editorial La Máscara. ISBN 84-7974-236-4.
- Halliwell, Geraldine (1999). If Only. Delacorte Press. ISBN 0-385-33475-3.
- Halliwell, Geraldine (2003). Just for the Record. Ebury Publishing. ISBN 0-09-188804-2.
- McGibbon, Rob (1997). Spice Power: The Inside Story. Macmillan Publishers Ltd. ISBN 0-7522-1142-0.
- Shuker, Roy (2001). Understanding Popular Music. Routledge. ISBN 0-415-23509-X.
- Sinclair, David (2004). Wannabe: How the Spice Girls Reinvented Pop Fame. Omnibus Press. ISBN 0-7119-8643-6.
- Spice Girls (1997). Girl Power!. Zone/Chameleon Books. ISBN 0-233-99165-4.
- Spice Girls (2008). Spice Girls Greatest Hits (Piano/Vocal/Guitar) Artist Songbook. Hal Leonard Corporation. ISBN 978-1-4234-3688-1.
- Whiteley, Sheila (2000). Women and Popular Music: Sexuality, Identity, and Subjectivity. Routledge. ISBN 0-415-21189-1.
