= List of number-one albums of 1996 (Spain) =

The List of number-one albums of 1996 in Spain is derived from the Top 100 España record chart published weekly by PROMUSICAE (Productores de Música de España), a non-profit organization composed by Spain and multinational record companies. This association tracks record sales (physical and digital) in Spain.

== Albums ==
Week	Chart Date	Album	Artist	Reference
1	January 1	Abriendo Puertas	Gloria Estefan	
2	January 8	Abriendo Puertas	Gloria Estefan	
3	January 15	Abriendo Puertas	Gloria Estefan	
4	January 23	Abriendo Puertas	Gloria Estefan	
5	January 30	Abriendo Puertas	Gloria Estefan	
6	February 5	Abriendo Puertas	Gloria Estefan	
7	February 12	Abriendo Puertas	Gloria Estefan	
8	February 19	Abriendo Puertas	Gloria Estefan	
9	February 26	(What's the Story) Morning Glory?	Oasis	
10	March 4	Abriendo Puertas	Gloria Estefan	
11	March 11	Abriendo Puertas	Gloria Estefan	
12	March 18	Abriendo Puertas	Gloria Estefan	
13	March 25	Golden Heart	Mark Knopfler	
14	April 1	Golden Heart	Mark Knopfler	
15	April 8	Golden Heart	Mark Knopfler	
16	April 15	Take That Greatest Hits	Take That	
17	April 22	D'un Temp, D'un País	Joan Manuel Serrat	
18	April 29	Take That Greatest Hits	Take That	
19	May 6	Take That Greatest Hits	Take That	
20	May 13	Older	George Michael	
21	May 20	Older	George Michael	
22	May 27	Older	George Michael	
23	June 3	Older	George Michael	
24	June 10	Older	George Michael	
25	June 17	Older	George Michael	
26	June 24	Yo, Mi, Me, Conmigo	Joaquín Sabina	
27	July 1	Yo, Mi, Me, Conmigo	Joaquín Sabina	
28	July 8	Lunas Rotas	Rosana	
29	July 15	Lunas Rotas	Rosana	
30	July 22	Lunas Rotas	Rosana	
31	July 29	Lunas Rotas	Rosana	
32	August 5	Lunas Rotas	Rosana	
33	August 12	Lunas Rotas	Rosana	
34	August 19	Lunas Rotas	Rosana	
35	August 26	Voyager	Mike Oldfield	
36	September 2	Voyager	Mike Oldfield	
37	September 9	Lunas Rotas	Rosana	
38	September 16	Lunas Rotas	Rosana	
39	September 23	Lunas Rotas	Rosana	
40	September 30	Parasiempre	Héroes del Silencio	
41	October 7	Lunas Rotas	Rosana	
42	October 14	Lunas Rotas	Rosana	
43	October 21	Lunas Rotas	Rosana	
44	October 28	Lunas Rotas	Rosana	
45	November 4	Tango	Julio Iglesias	
46	November 11	Tango	Julio Iglesias	
47	November 18	Tango	Julio Iglesias	
48	November 25	Tango	Julio Iglesias	
49	December 2	Tango	Julio Iglesias	
50	December 9	Spice	Spice Girls	
51	December 16	Spice	Spice Girls	
52	December 23	Spice	Spice Girls	
53	December 30	Spice	Spice Girls	

== See also ==
- List of number-one singles of 1996 (Spain)
