= List of best-selling albums of the 1990s in the United Kingdom =

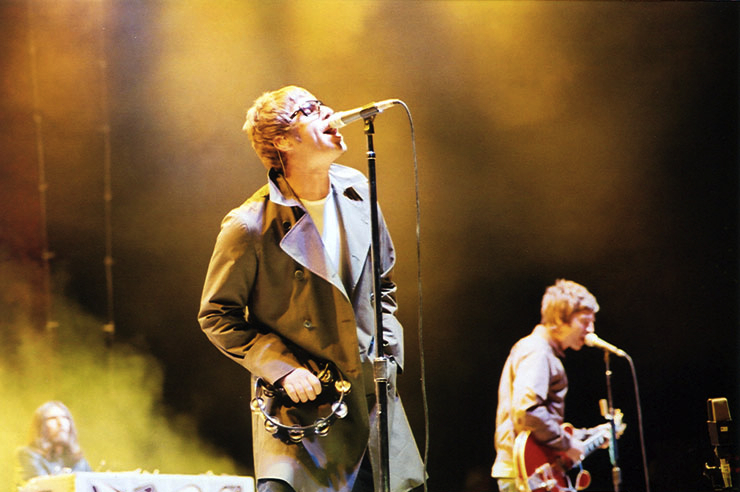
British band Oasis had the biggest-selling album of the 1990s in the UK with (What's the Story) Morning Glory?

The UK Albums Chart is a music chart that calculates the best-selling artist albums of the week in the United Kingdom. For the purposes of inclusion in the chart an album is defined by the Official Charts Company (OCC) as being a type of music release that features more than four tracks and lasts longer than 25 minutes.

At the beginning of the 1990s, sales of singles and albums in the United Kingdom were compiled on behalf of the British music industry by Gallup. This continued until 1994, when the contract to compile the UK charts was won by Millward Brown, who took over on 1 February 1994. On 1 July 1998 Chart Information Network (CIN) took over the management of the chart: CIN changed their name to the Official UK Charts Company in October 2001, later shortened to the Official Charts Company in 2008.

Unlike other decades, no decade-end charts for the 1990s for either singles or albums were broadcast on BBC Radio 1 at the end of 1999, and no detailed lists were published in the UK music trade magazine Music Week. Gallup's sales figures were not made available to its successors, and Millward Brown's sales data from 1994 to 1996 were later substantially revised. This made it difficult to obtain accurate sales figures for the decade. Two weeks before the end of the decade Music Week published lists of the top twenty best-selling singles and albums of the 1990s in the UK: this is the only known list of the best-selling albums of the 1990s officially produced by CIN/OCC. The top twenty lists included sales figures, but the subsequent revisions of the data have made the original 1999 figures unreliable, and consequently they have been omitted from the table below.

The biggest-selling album of the 1990s was (What's the Story) Morning Glory? by the British band Oasis. Released in October 1995, the album was the second biggest-selling album of both 1995 and 1996. In second place was Stars by Simply Red, which had achieved the distinction of being the best-selling album in consecutive calendar years (1991 and 1992), the first album to achieve this feat since Bridge over Troubled Water by Simon & Garfunkel, in 1970 and 1971. In third place was Spice by the Spice Girls, which spent 15 weeks at number-one, more than any album during the 1990s.

The best-selling compilation was The Immaculate Collection, the first greatest hits album by the American singer/songwriter Madonna: the top twenty included six other greatest hits compilations.

== Chart ==
Best-selling albums of the 1990s in the UK
No.	Album	Artist	Record label (Note: The record labels, years and chart peaks are those given by the OCC.)	Year	Chart peak
1	(What's the Story) Morning Glory?	Oasis	Creation	1995	1
2	Stars	Simply Red	East West	1991	1
3	Spice	Spice Girls	Virgin	1996	1
4	Talk on Corners	The Corrs	Atlantic	1997	1
5	Jagged Little Pill	Alanis Morissette	Maverick	1996	1
6	Robson & Jerome	Robson & Jerome	RCA	1995	1
7	The Immaculate Collection	Madonna	Sire	1990	1
8	Urban Hymns	The Verve	Hut	1997	1
9	Gold: Greatest Hits	ABBA	Polydor	1992	1
10	Falling into You	Celine Dion	Epic	1996	1
11	Greatest Hits II	Queen	Parlophone	1991	1
12	The Very Best of Elton John	Elton John	Rocket	1990	1
13	The Bodyguard (original soundtrack)	Various Artists	Arista	1992	1 (Note: The Bodyguard did not qualify for the UK artist albums chart as its songs were by various artists: the peak position shown is that for the UK compilation chart.)
14	Simply the Best	Tina Turner	Capitol	1991	2
15	Ladies & Gentlemen: The Best of George Michael	George Michael	Epic	1998	1
16	Automatic for the People	R.E.M.	Warner Bros.	1992	1
17	Dangerous	Michael Jackson	Epic	1991	1
18	I've Been Expecting You	Robbie Williams	Chrysalis	1998	1
19	The Colour of My Love	Celine Dion	Epic	1994	1
20	Carry On up the Charts: The Best of the Beautiful South	The Beautiful South	Go! Discs	1994	1
