= Lunas Rotas =

Studio album by Rosana Arbelo
- Released: 10 June 1996
- Recorded: Sonoland, Madrid, Spain
- Producer: José A Morero

Rosana Arbelo chronology
Lunas Rotas (1996)	Luna Nueva (1998)

Lunas Rotas (Broken moons in English) is the debut album of Spanish singer and composer Rosana Arbelo.

The title track and the song "El Talismán" were used in the soundtrack of the 1996 movie Curdled. Billboard noted: "An accomplished pianist and guitarist, Rosana Arbelo's extraordinary voice gives Lunas Rotas an intimate quality. […] flamenco-pop sisters Azúcar Moreno are among those who have recorded her songs, and like that of Azúcar Moreno, Arbelo's music has a distinct Caribbean and Latin influence".

As of September 2016, Lunas Rotas was ranked joint 7th in the list of best-selling albums in Spain; it had certified physical sales of 1,100,000 according to Productores de Música de España (PROMUSICAE). It further sold 400,000 units in Europe as of 1998.

== Track listing ==
All songs written by Rosana Arbelo

No.	Title	Length
1.	"Furia de color"	3:05
2.	"El Talismán"	3:35
3.	"A fuego lento"	3:45
4.	"No sé mañana"	4:50
5.	"Lunas rotas"	4:35
6.	"Si tú no estás aqui"	4:10
7.	"Bebes de mí"	4:15
8.	"Sin miedo"	3:22
9.	"Deray"	4:33
10.	"Así son las cosas"	3:54
11.	"Descubriéndote"	2:58
12.	"Nadie más que yo"	5:15
13.	"A fuego lento (bonus track – versión remix)"
14.	"El Talismán (bonus track – versión remix)"

== Personnel ==
(Alphabetical order) Per sleeve notes

- Rosana Arbelo: Lead vocals; Backing vocals (tracks 1, 2, 3, 6, 7, 8, 9, 11); Spanish guitar (tracks 6, 10, 11, 12)
- Paco Bastante: Bass guitar (tracks: 1 to 5, 7, 9 to 11)
- Sergio Castillo: Backing vocals (tracks 1, 2); Drums (tracks 1 to 5, 7 to 11); Shaker (track 8)
- Tino Di Geraldo: Cajón (track 8)
- Carlos Domenech: Backing vocals (tracks 1, 2, 9, 10)
- Luis Dulzaides: Percussion (tracks 1 to 5, 7 to 10)
- Alba Fresno: Viol (track 9)
- Antonio García De Diego: Backing vocals (track 2); Keyboards (track 3)
- Cristina Gonzalez: Backing vocals (tracks 1, 2)
- Tato Icasto: Electric piano (tracks 3, 10); Keyboards (track 4); Wurlitzer organ (track 10)
- Fernando Illan: Bass guitar (track 8)
- Juan Maya: Flamenco guitar (track 8
- Jesus Ortiz: Backing vocals (track 7)
- Kike Perdomo: Saxophones (track 7)
- José A. Morero: 12-string guitar (tracks 2, 12); Acoustic guitar (tracks: 1 to 4, 6, 9, 11); Electric guitar (tracks 1 to 10, 12); Spanish guitar (tracks 5, 7, 9); Mandolin (track 2); electric piano (track 2); Keyboards (tracks 5, 7, 8, 9, 11); piano (track 9)

== Production personnel ==
(Alphabetical order)

- Miguel De La Vega: Mixing;
- Iñaki Del Olmo: Mixing assistant
- Carlos Martos: Mastering
- Lola Román: Mixing assistant
- José A. Morero: Mixing; Producer

== Certifications and sales ==
Region	Certification	Certified units/sales
Argentina (CAPIF)	5× Platinum	300,000^{^}
Italy	—	100,000
Spain (Promusicae)	11× Platinum	1,100,000^{^}
^{^} Shipments figures based on certification alone.

== See also ==
- List of number-one albums of 1996 (Spain)
- List of best-selling Latin albums
