= List of number-one albums of 1997 (Canada) =

These are the Canadian number-one albums of 1997. The charts were compiled and published by RPM every Monday.

Issue date	Album	Artist
January 6	Razorblade Suitcase	Bush
January 13	Tragic Kingdom	No Doubt
January 20	Tragic Kingdom	No Doubt
January 27	Backstreet Boys	Backstreet Boys
February 3	Backstreet Boys	Backstreet Boys
February 10	Tragic Kingdom	No Doubt
February 17	Tragic Kingdom	No Doubt
February 24	Tragic Kingdom	No Doubt
March 3	Secret Samadhi	Live
March 10	1997 Grammy Nominess	Various Artists
March 17	Pop	U2
March 24	Pop	U2
March 31	Spice	Spice Girls
April 7	Spice	Spice Girls
April 14	Spice	Spice Girls
April 21	Spice	Spice Girls
April 28	Spice	Spice Girls
May 5	Spice	Spice Girls
May 12	Now! 2	Various Artists
May 19	Now! 2	Various Artists
May 26	Now! 2	Various Artists
June 2	Live Between Us	The Tragically Hip
June 9	Live Between Us	The Tragically Hip
June 16	Wu-Tang Forever	Wu-Tang Clan
June 23	Now! 2	Various Artists
June 30	Now! 2	Various Artists
July 7	Now! 2	Various Artists
July 14	The Fat of the Land	The Prodigy
July 21	Now! 2	Various Artists
July 28	Surfacing	Sarah McLachlan
August 4	No Way Out	Puff Daddy
August 11	No Way Out	Puff Daddy
August 18	No Way Out	Puff Daddy
August 25	Backstreet's Back	Backstreet Boys
September 1	Backstreet's Back	Backstreet Boys
September 8	Be Here Now	Oasis
September 15	Backstreet's Back	Backstreet Boys
September 22	Backstreet's Back	Backstreet Boys
September 29	Butterfly	Mariah Carey
October 6	Aquarium	Aqua
October 13	Aquarium	Aqua
October 20	Aquarium	Aqua
October 27	Aquarium	Aqua
November 3	Aquarium	Aqua
November 10	Harlem World	Mase
November 17	Come On Over	Shania Twain
November 24	Come On Over	Shania Twain
December 1	Let's Talk About Love	Céline Dion
December 8	Let's Talk About Love	Céline Dion
December 15	Big Shiny Tunes 2	Various Artists
December 22	Big Shiny Tunes 2	Various Artists
December 29	Big Shiny Tunes 2	Various Artists

== See also ==
- List of Canadian number-one singles of 1997

== Sources ==
https://www.worldradiohistory.com/Archive-All-Music/RPM.htm
