= Johan Camitz =

- Born: 1961 or 1962; Stockholm, Sweden
- Died: August 10, 2000 (aged 38); Manhattan, New York, United States
- Occupation: Director

Johan Camitz (June 29, 1962 – August 10, 2000) was a Swedish director of music videos and advertisements.

== Biography ==
Camitz studied law and worked for several years as a sculptor. He was then given an opportunity for a Diesel commercial. He later worked for Propaganda Films and shot commercials for Volkswagen, Diesel, and Nike. He has been awarded a silver D&AD award, two gold Clio Awards, and three gold and a silver award at the Cannes Lions International Advertising Festival. Among other notable music video collaborations, Camitz directed the Spice Girls' first music video for their hit single "Wannabe".

In August 2000, after a night out with friends and colleagues in Manhattan, Camitz was crossing the street on his way to his apartment in Soho when he was hit by an SUV, resulting in his death at St. Vincent's Hospital Medical Center several hours later. The driver of the vehicle, Ivory "Nut" Davis, had been shot in a gang-related incident and was attempting to flee his attackers, but he was unable to maintain control of his vehicle and drove up on the sidewalk, striking and killing Camitz. The driver was reported dead at the scene from his gunshot wounds.

== Advertising ==
- 1995 – Diesel
- 1998 – Nike (Cannes Advertising Film Awards)
- 1999 – Volkswagen (ANDY award)

== Music videos ==
- 1996 – "Wannabe" by Spice Girls
- 1997 – "Save Tonight" by Eagle-Eye Cherry
