= Rosana Arbelo =

Spanish singer and composer

Rosana
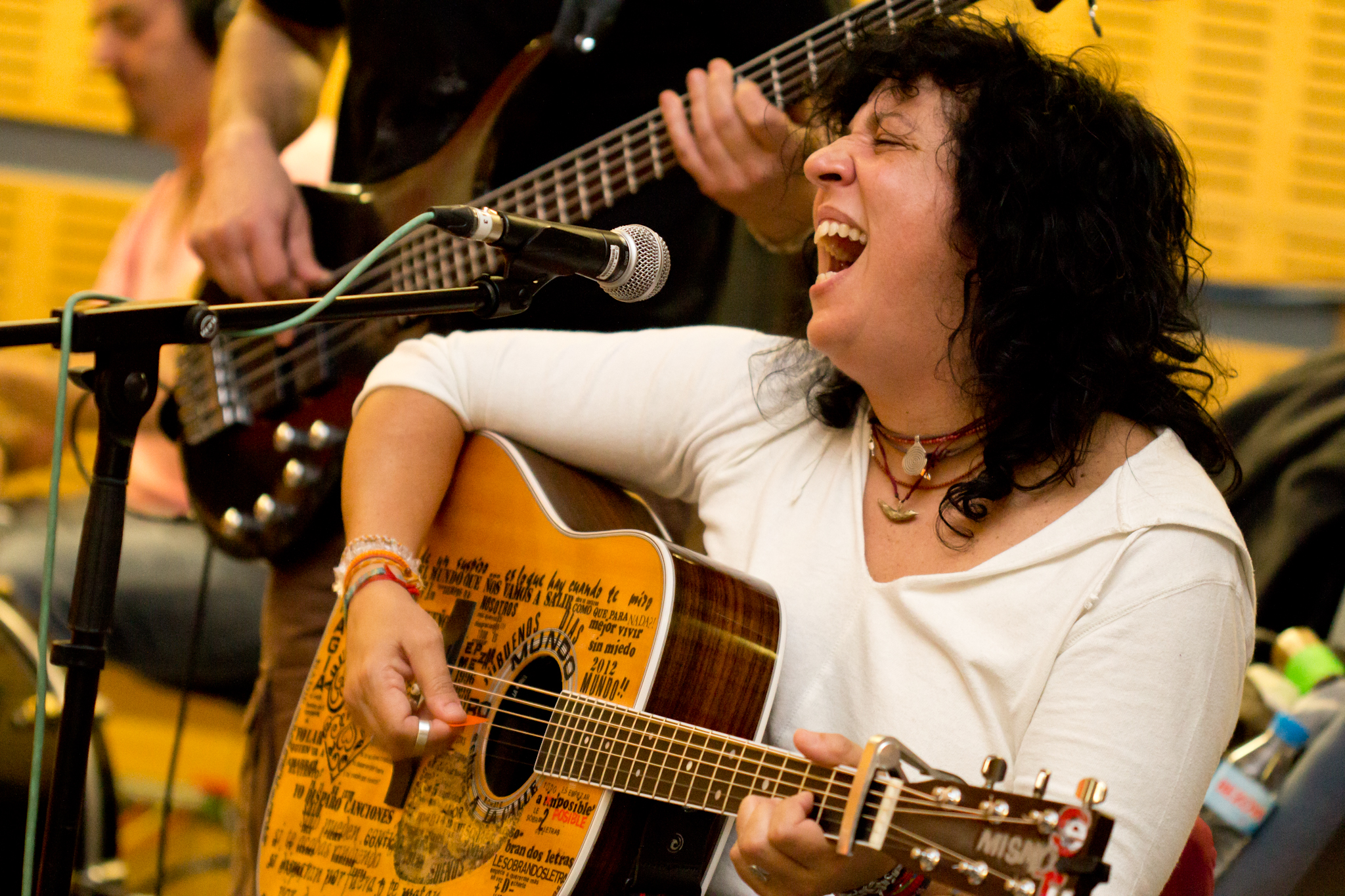

Background information
- Born: Rosana Arbelo Gopar; October 24, 1963 (age 62); Lanzarote, Canary Islands, Spain
- Genres: Latin pop; folk; pop rock
- Occupations: singer; songwriter
- Instruments: guitar; voice
- Years active: 1996–present
- Labels: MCA Records; Universal Latino Records; Warner Music Spain

Rosana Arbelo Gopar (Spanish pronunciation: [roˈsana aɾˈβelo ɣoˈpaɾ]; born October 24, 1963), known professionally by her mononym Rosana, is a Spanish singer and songwriter.

== Biography ==
=== Early life and beginnings ===
She was born in 1963 on the island of Lanzarote in the Canary Islands, where she was raised. She was the youngest of a family of eight children. Arbelo was given her first guitar at the age of five years old and wrote her first song aged eight.

She began composing music after moving to Madrid in the early 1980s. She won first place in the Benidorm Song Festival in 1996 with her song "Fuego y Miel" ("Fire and Honey" in English), which led her winning a recording contract with MCA Records. Before pursuing a solo career, she wrote songs for other musicians, including Joaquín Sabina, Miguel Ríos, and María Dolores Pradera.

=== Rise to fame in the 1990s ===
Her debut album, Lunas Rotas, was released in 1996. The soundtrack for the 1996 movie Curdled featured her songs "Lunas Rotas" and "El Talismán", exposing her to an international audience.

Her second album, Luna Nueva, was released in 1998 and had a more mature and deep sound, but maintained the natural and smooth sentiments that characterize the artist. After three years, during which she wrote songs for other artists, her third album, Rosana, was released in 2001. Its sounds explored the rhythms of her birthplace in the Canary Islands.

=== Growing of popularity in the 2000s and the 2010s ===
In December 2003, Rosana released Marca Registrada, a double-disc album that contained 10 new songs, 12 greatest hits, and two videos. That same year her book Material sensible: Canciones y poemas (Sensitive Material: Songs and Poems). It is a compilation of thoughts, poems, songs written for other performers, songs she wrote and performed, as well as some unreleased songs.

In the summer of 2005 the album Magia was released and at Christmas time came Grandes Exitos, another greatest hits compilation. In 2009 she released the album A Las Buenas y Las Malas, followed by ¡Buenos Días, Mundo! in 2011, and 8 Lunas in 2013.

2016 saw the release of En la Memoria de la Piel, a collection of 11 songs she wrote following her 2013-2015 international tour, which included concerts in Europe, the United States and Latin America. In 2018 a new version of En la Memoria de la Piel was issued, this time as a two CD set, consisting of a disc of the 11 original songs plus a duet with Mexican singer Carlos Rivera on the song No Olvidarme De Olvidar, and a second disc of acoustic versions of all the songs of the original album.

=== Role of judge in talent show programs ===
Rosana also appears regularly as an adviser and coach on the Spanish television song contest programs like Operación Triunfo, La Voz Kids, and La Voz Senior.

== Discography ==
=== Albums ===
- Lunas Rotas, MCA Records 1996
- Luna Nueva, Universal Latino Records 1998
- Rosana, Universal Latino Records 2001
- Marca Registrada, Universal Latino Records 2003
- Magia, Warner Music Spain 2005
- A Las Buenas y a Las Malas, Warner Music Spain 2009
- ¡Buenos Días Mundo!, Warner Music Spain 2011
- 8 Lunas, Warner Music Spain 2013
- En la memoria de la piel, Warner Music Spain 2016

== See also ==
- List of best-selling Latin music artists
