= Chris Herbert =

British talent manager

Chris Herbert is a British talent manager who has helped oversee the careers of the Spice Girls, Five, Stephen Gately, Hear'Say, B*Witched, Honeyz and Ben's Brother. He is the son of talent manager Bob Herbert.

== Career ==
With father Bob Herbert a music talent manager the young Chris Herbert grew up in music industry orientated environment that had a large influence on his eventual career direction. At the age of twenty-one Herbert approached his father for advice and assistance in setting up his own talent management company. Safe Corporation was founded as an independent music management company in March 1994. The first project the pair worked on was the creation of an all-girl pop group to cater to what he had identified as a potentially massive untapped market.

=== Spice Girls ===
By mid-1994, the Herberts and Chic Murphy had auditioned 600 applicants, and whittled the line-up down to Melanie Brown, Geri Halliwell, Victoria Adams, Lianne Morgan (replaced by Melanie C) and Michelle Stephenson (replaced by Emma Bunton).

After a large amount of development in studios, the final group line-up felt insecure about the lack of a contract and frustrated by the direction in which Heart Management was steering them. Chris Herbert set up a showcase performance for the group in front of industry writers, producers and A&R men in December 1994 at the Nomis Studios in Shepherd's Bush. Due to the large interest in the group, the Herberts quickly set about creating a binding contract for the group, but all five members delayed signing on legal advice. In March 1995, because of the group's frustration at their management, due to the lengthy development period, they parted from the Herbert's Heart Management.

After signing an agreement with Simon Fuller of 19 Entertainment, they released their first single in summer 1996.

=== Tulisa Contostavlos Sex tape ===
Herbert was the manager of Justin Edwards, also known as MC Ultra. With his career not gaining traction, in late 2011, Edwards informed Herbert that he had a sex tape of himself and his ex-lover, singer and The X Factor judge Tulisa Contostavlos. By early 2012, Edwards had an agreement with others to distribute the tape. Herbert says that he advised Edwards not to release the tape, but negotiated a legal restraint clause with the contract Edwards signed as it was "career suicide". The tape was released to the press in March 2012. Tulisa was quickly granted an injunction (Contostavlos v Mendahun) that legally blocks the distribution of the tape worldwide, prohibiting anyone from using, publishing, communicating or disclosing all or any part of the film to any other person.
