= Michelle Stephenson =

British singer and television presenter (born 1977)

- Born: Michelle Stephenson; 3 January 1977 (age 49); Abingdon, Oxfordshire, England
- Genres: Pop; dance-pop
- Occupations: Singer; presenter
- Years active: 1990s

Michelle Stephenson (born 3 January 1977) is a British pop singer and television presenter. At the age of 17, she was briefly a member of the girl group that went on to become the Spice Girls.

== Touch (Spice Girls) ==
Alongside Melanie Brown, Victoria Adams (later Beckham), Melanie Chisholm and Geri Halliwell, Stephenson completed the original 1994 line-up of Touch, a girl group that would later go on to become the Spice Girls. Stephenson received the highest scores at the first audition, where she sang Dina Carroll's song "Don't Be a Stranger". Stephenson was a member of the group for only a short period before commitment issues prompted Heart Management to remove her. According to Bob Herbert, she was fired because "she just wasn't fitting in... she would never have gelled with it and I had to tell her to go". Stephenson later challenged Herbert's claim, stating that it was her decision to leave due to her mother being diagnosed with breast cancer. Beckham later dismissed this claim, saying she "just couldn't be arsed" to put in the work the rest of the group was doing. Chisholm stated in her 2022 memoir, Who I Am: My Story, that Michelle was undecided if she wanted to remain in the band or attend university, and that she did not share the same passion for the band as the others, even being found sunbathing during early rehearsals. Stephenson was replaced by Emma Bunton.

Stephenson has given several conflicting interviews about her time with the group, stating that she both does and does not regret leaving them. She has also joked she would have been known as Mel S and it would have been confusing if the band also had a Mel C and a Mel B, and has also asserted she was going to be known as Sexy Spice. (The nicknames were given by Top of the Pops magazine after launch.) Stephenson claims she was very close with Geri whilst in the band and wishes they had remained friends, but noted in an interview that she and Beckham did not always see eye to eye.

Stephenson's boldest claim was that the reason Beckham does not have any solo lines in the group's first song "Wannabe" is due to the single being written with Stephenson as part of the group, Beckham subsequently refusing to take Stephenson's solo lines. However, many other accounts suggest that "Wannabe" was written after Stephenson had left the group, and that Beckham's absence from the track was due to a scheduling conflict during the writing sessions.

== Presenting and music ==
Stephenson worked briefly as a television presenter for LWT, ITV, Friendly TV, and BSkyB. She also filmed a television show in Malta called Wild Games before forming a songwriting partnership with Ben Hackett and Mike Edwards (under the name SHEsongs). She has also worked as a session singer for various record companies. She performed backing vocals for singers like Ricky Martin and Julio Iglesias, while working on her own songs as well. In November 2003, Stephenson recorded and released an EP entitled SHESongs, featuring six songs called "In Control", "Fall Over", "Hey Sugar", "Dirty Music", "Boom, Boom", and "Happens for a Reason".

== Filmography ==
Year	Title	Role	Notes
2001	London Weekend Television	Presenter	5 episodes
2001	Raw Spice	Herself	Documentary
2008	E! True Hollywood Story	Herself	Documentary

== Albums ==
- 1997: Spice Girls – Old Spice the Early Years (Interview)
- 2003: SHEsongs (EP)

== See also ==
- List of pre-fame band departures
