= Bob Herbert (talent manager) =

British talent manager (1942–1999)

- Born: 7 February 1942; Brentford, London, England
- Died: 9 August 1999 (aged 57); Windsor Great Park, Berkshire, England
- Occupation: Music industry executive
- Years active: 1985–1999
- Known for: Managing the Spice Girls

Robert Herbert (7 February 1942 – 9 August 1999) was an English talent manager. He was the original manager of the Spice Girls.

== Biography ==
=== Early life ===
Born in Brentford, England, Herbert qualified as an accountant and first got involved in the music industry in 1985. He took a liking to Matt and Luke Goss, twin friends of his son Chris when they were pupils together at Collingwood School in Camberley, Surrey. Although the twins were only 15, they had formed their own pop group called Gloss with the bassist Craig Logan. Realising the blond looks of Matt and Luke could be exploited to market a group that could be the Eighties' answer to the Bay City Rollers, Herbert offered Gloss advice and provided rehearsal space for them in his summer house. He introduced them to songwriters, financed their early demo tapes and plotted their route to success.

=== Spice Girls ===
By mid-1994, the Herberts and Murphy had auditioned 600 applicants, and whittled the line-up down to Melanie Brown, Geri Halliwell, Victoria Adams, Lianne Morgan, quickly replaced by Melanie C and Michelle Stephenson, quickly replaced by Emma Bunton. The Spice Girls were however first called Touch but Spice was considered much better. Therefore, the spice girls got their own names. Victoria was Posh, Mel C was Sporty, Mel B was Scary, Geri was Ginger and Emma was Baby. In 1997, the Herberts reverted to their original boy-band masterplan. "We decided to put an ad in The Stage newspaper, as we had done when we were auditioning for the Spice Girls," recalled Bob Herbert of Five.

=== Personal life and death ===
Herbert was married to Ann and had one son, Chris Herbert and one daughter, Nicky.

On 9 August 1999, Herbert was driving his red MG F through Windsor Great Park in Berkshire. Suddenly, due to heavy rain, he lost control. The car spun and collided with another car, a silver Toyota Corolla. Herbert's car then collided with a wooden fence around the park. Herbert had to be cut from his car by fire and rescue teams, and was taken to Wexham Park Hospital, Slough, by air ambulance, where he was pronounced dead on arrival.
