= ...Live in Memphis 1997 =

Video by Celine Dion
- Released: 2 November 1998
- Recorded: 14–15 March 1997
- Venue: Mid-South Coliseum (Memphis)
- Genre: Pop
- Length: 95:00
- Languages: English; French
- Labels: Columbia; Epic
- Director: Bud Schaetzle
- Producers: Martin Fischer; Rob Cowlyn

Celine Dion chronology
Live à Paris (1996)	...Live in Memphis 1997 (1998)	Au cœur du stade (1999)

...Live in Memphis 1997 is the fourth home video by Canadian singer Celine Dion. It was released on VHS on 2 November 1998 by Columbia Records and Epic Records. The concert was recorded on 14–15 March 1997 at the Mid-South Coliseum in Memphis, Tennessee, during the Falling into You: Around the World tour.

== Content ==
The release presents previously unreleased live performances from Dion's album Falling into You. The 17‑song program includes a rare rendition of "The Power of the Dream", written for the 1996 Summer Olympics in Atlanta, and a cover of "Twist and Shout" by The Isley Brothers. Dion also performed "River Deep, Mountain High", which was broadcast on television but omitted from the VHS edition.

Three songs from the concert — "Beauty and the Beast", "To Love You More", and "Because You Loved Me" — were later included on the All the Way... A Decade of Song & Video DVD in 2001.

== Commercial performance ==
...Live in Memphis 1997 received several sales certifications, including platinum in Canada and gold in France and the United Kingdom.

== Track listing ==
No.	Title	Writer(s)	Length
1.	"Love Can Move Mountains" (intro instrumental)	Diane Warren	1:02
2.	"The Power of Love"	Gunther Mende; Candy DeRouge; Jennifer Rush; Mary Susan Applegate	4:29
3.	"Seduces Me"	Dan Hill; John Sheard	3:47
4.	"All by Myself"	Eric Carmen; Sergei Rachmaninoff	4:35
5.	"If You Asked Me To"	Diane Warren	2:50
6.	"Misled"	Peter Zizzo; Jimmy Bralower	2:28
7.	"Beauty and the Beast" (with Terry Bradford)	Alan Menken; Howard Ashman	2:42
8.	"Declaration of Love"	Michael Jay; Claude Gaudette	4:23
9.	"Pour que tu m'aimes encore"	Jean-Jacques Goldman	4:09
10.	"J'irai où tu iras" (with Marc Langis)	Goldman	3:23
11.	"It's All Coming Back to Me Now"	Jim Steinman	4:54
12.	"To Love You More" (with Taro Hakase)	David Foster; Junior Miles	4:53
13.	"Le ballet"	Goldman	9:14
14.	"Love Can Move Mountains"	Warren	4:14
15.	"Call the Man"	Andy Hill; Peter Sinfield	4:31
16.	"The Power of the Dream"	Foster; Babyface; Linda Thompson	4:27
17.	"Twist and Shout"	Phil Medley; Bert Berns	1:22
18.	"Because You Loved Me"	Warren	5:08
19.	"Declaration of Love" (outro instrumental)	Jay; Gaudette	1:45

== Charts ==
Chart performance
Chart (1998–1999)	Peak position
Australian Music DVD (ARIA)	5
UK Music Videos (Official Charts)	11

== Certifications ==
Certifications
Region	Certification	Certified units/sales
Canada (Music Canada)	Platinum	10,000^{^}
France (SNEP)	Gold	10,000^{*}
United Kingdom (BPI)	Gold	25,000^{*}
^{*} Sales figures based on certification alone.^{^} Shipments figures based on certification alone.

== Release history ==
Release history
Region	Date	Label	Format	Catalog
Europe	2 November 1998	Columbia	VHS	2008472
Japan	21 January 1999	Epic	VHS	ESVU‑165
Australia	February 1999	Epic	VHS	200847 2
Canada	15 June 1999	Epic	VHS	2008472
Asia	1999	Columbia	VSD	M2VCD200847
Europe	30 November 2001	Columbia	VSD	M2VCD200847
