= Live in Memphis =

Live in Memphis may refer to:

- Live in Memphis (Celine Dion video), 1998
- Live in Memphis, a DVD by Elvis Costello and the Imposters, 2005
- Live in Memphis, an album by Mr. Dibbs, 2000

== See also ==
- Elvis Recorded Live on Stage in Memphis, 1974
