= List of number-one singles of 1996 (Canada) =

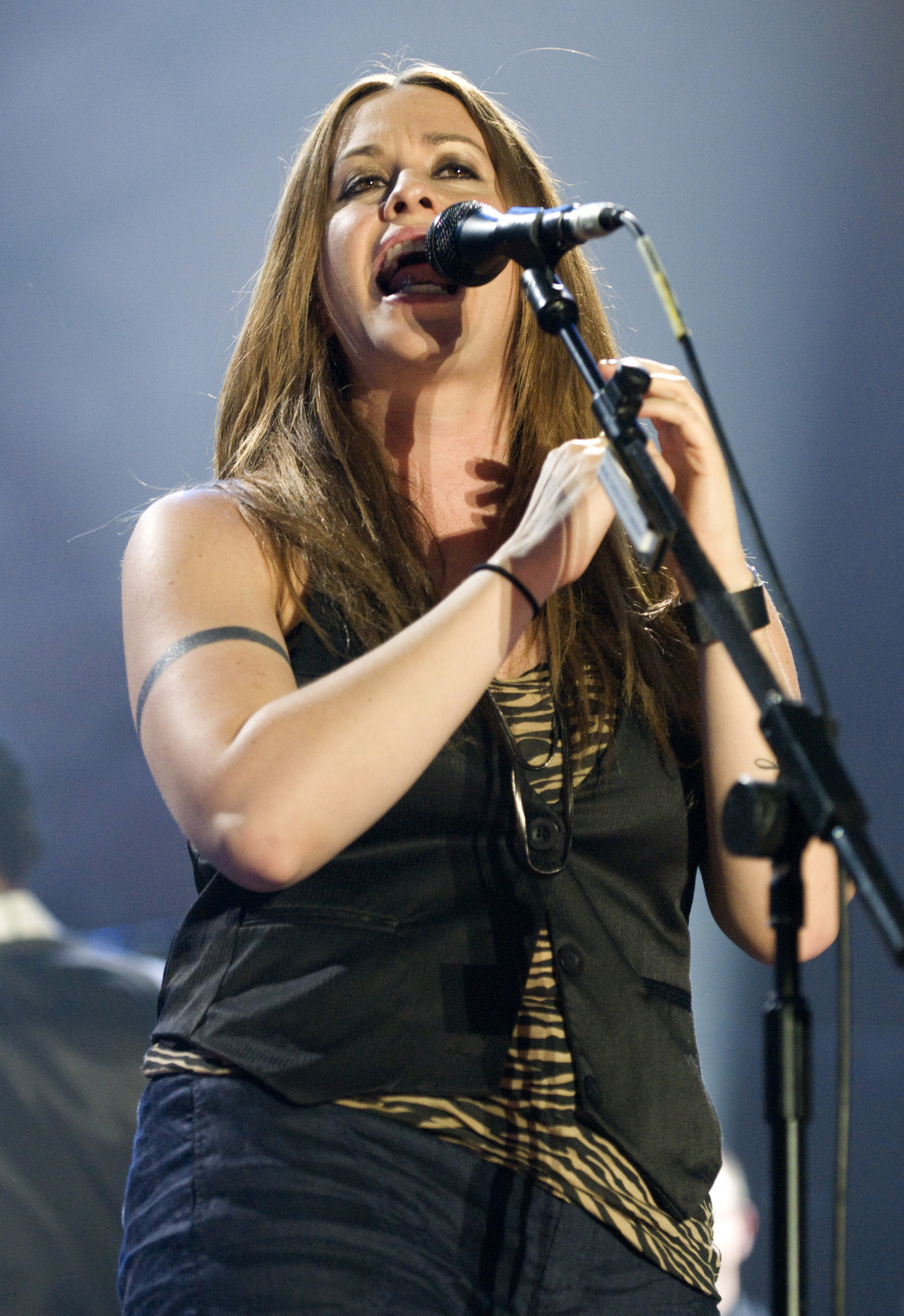
Alanis Morissette, who had four different number-one singles in 1996, had the most successful hit of the year with "You Learn". Her preceding single, "Ironic", came in second place.

RPM was a Canadian magazine that published the best-performing singles of Canada from 1964 to 2000. 1996 saw twenty-three songs reach the number-one spot in Canada. Alanis Morissette achieved both the first and last number-one singles of the year: "Hand in My Pocket" and "Head over Feet", respectively. Six different artists reached number one for the first time in 1996: Joan Osborne, Everything but the Girl, Collective Soul, Melissa Etheridge, BoDeans, and the Tragically Hip.

Canadian singer Alanis Morissette was the most successful act of 1996 in Canada, reaching number one with four different singles between January and November: "Hand in My Pocket", "Ironic", "You Learn", and "Head over Feet"—all from her album Jagged Little Pill. Although "Ironic" spent six weeks at number one, it was the second-most-successful single of the year; "You Learn" came in first place, topping the RPM Singles Chart for three nonconsecutive weeks in July. Mariah Carey, Hootie & the Blowfish, and Bryan Adams were the only other acts to top Canada's chart with multiple singles.

Aside from Morissette, three other Canadian acts reached number one: the Tragically Hip, Bryan Adams, and Celine Dion. Morissette's "Head over Feet" spent the most weeks at the top in 1996, staying there for seven weeks. Eric Clapton stayed five weeks at number one with "Change the World", as did John Mellencamp with "Key West Intermezzo (I Saw You First)". Hootie & the Blowfish spent four weeks at number one with two hits: "Time" and "Old Man & Me (When I Get to Heaven)", while Mariah Carey, Everything but the Girl, and Bryan Adams each logged three weeks at number one with their chart-topping singles.

Key
† Indicates best-performing single of 1996

== Chart history ==
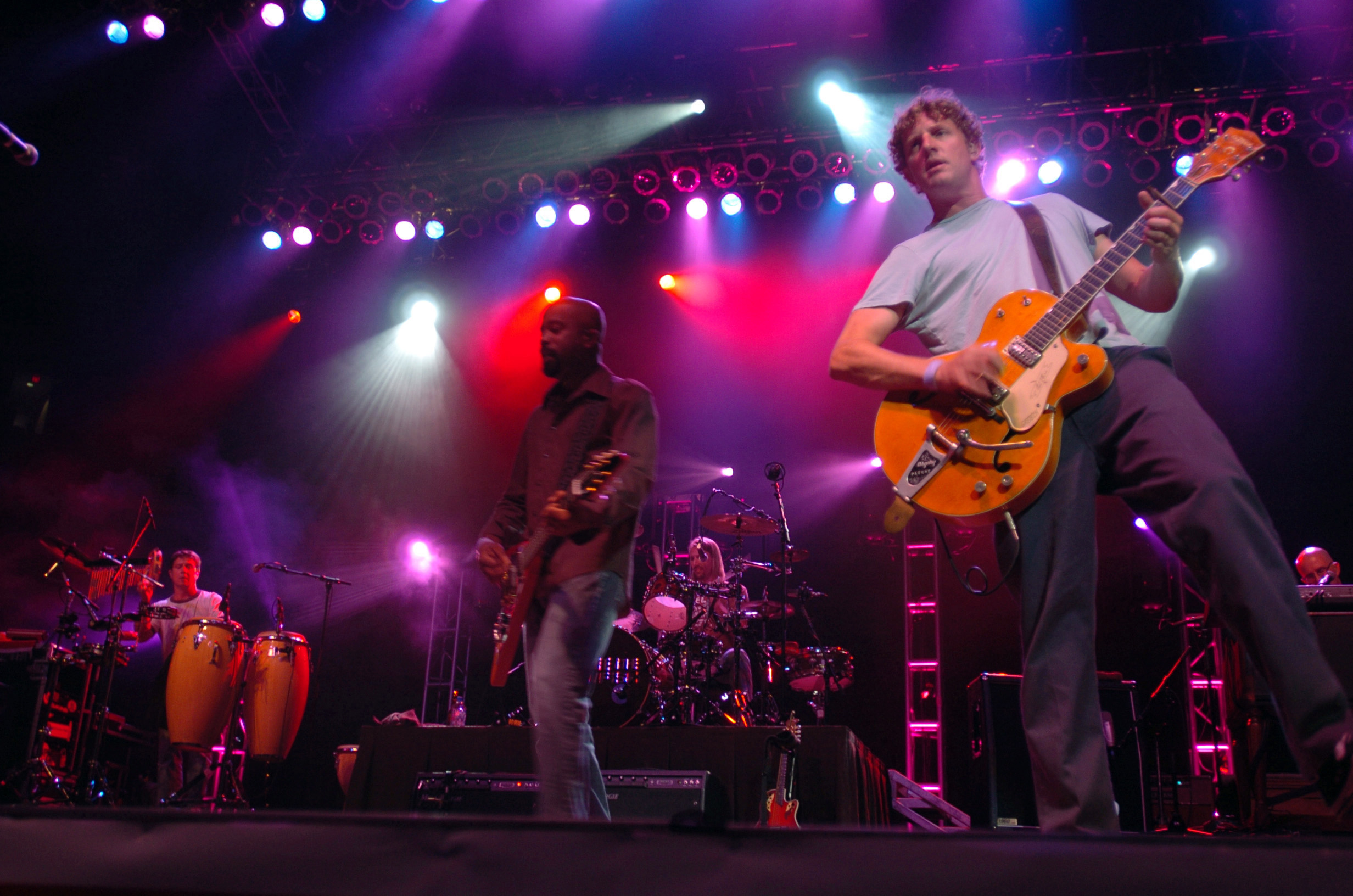
Hootie & the Blowfish held the number-one position in Canada for four weeks with two tracks: "Time" and "Old Man & Me (When I Get to Heaven)".

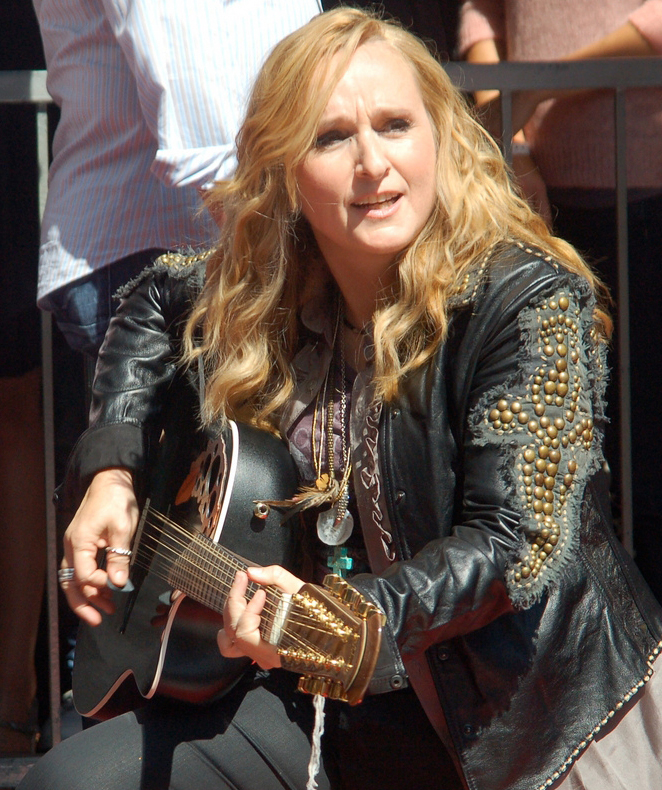
"I Want to Come Over" gave Melissa Etheridge her first number-one single in Canada when it topped the chart in March.

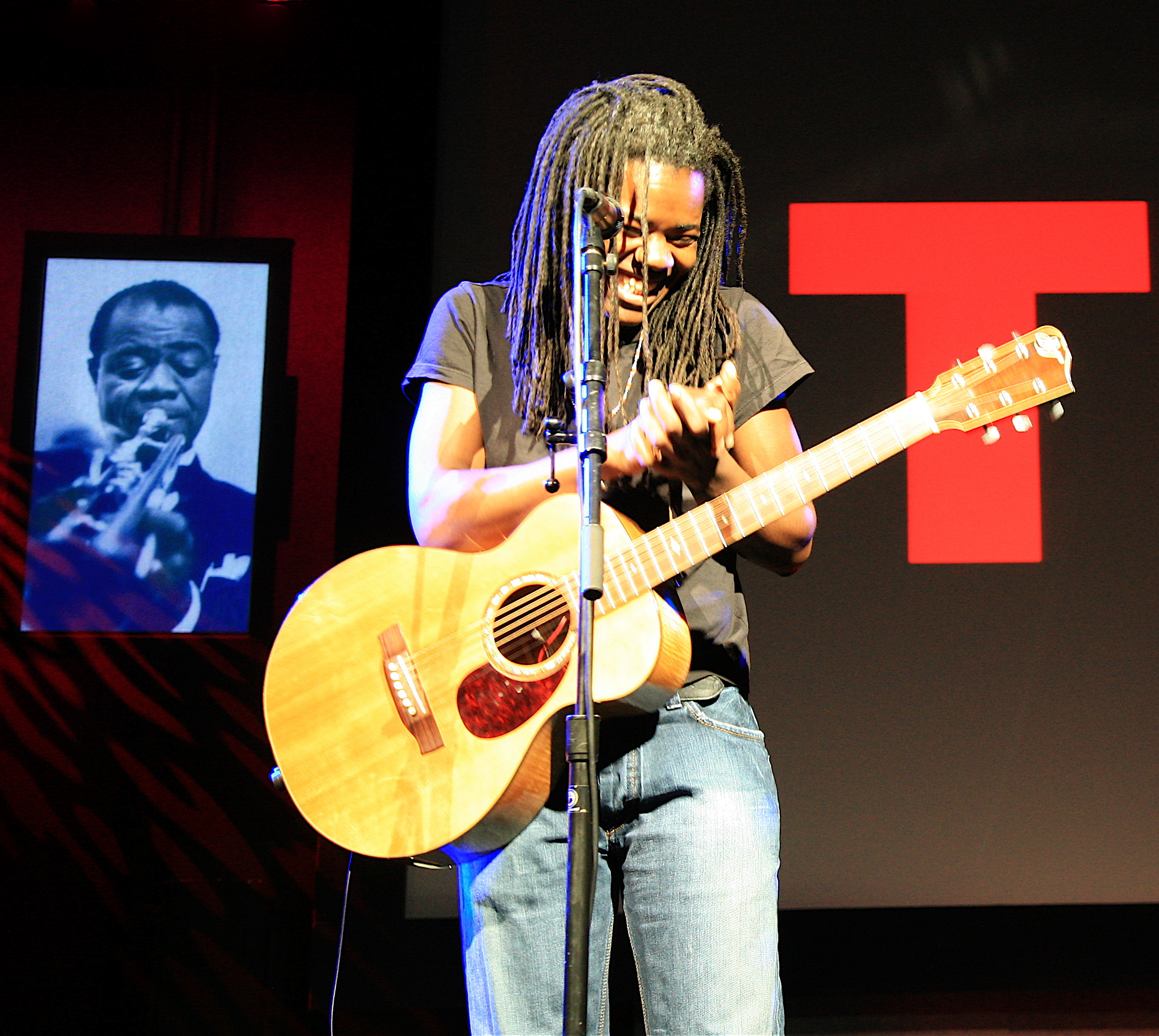
Tracy Chapman gained her second Canadian number-one single in 1996 with "Give Me One Reason".

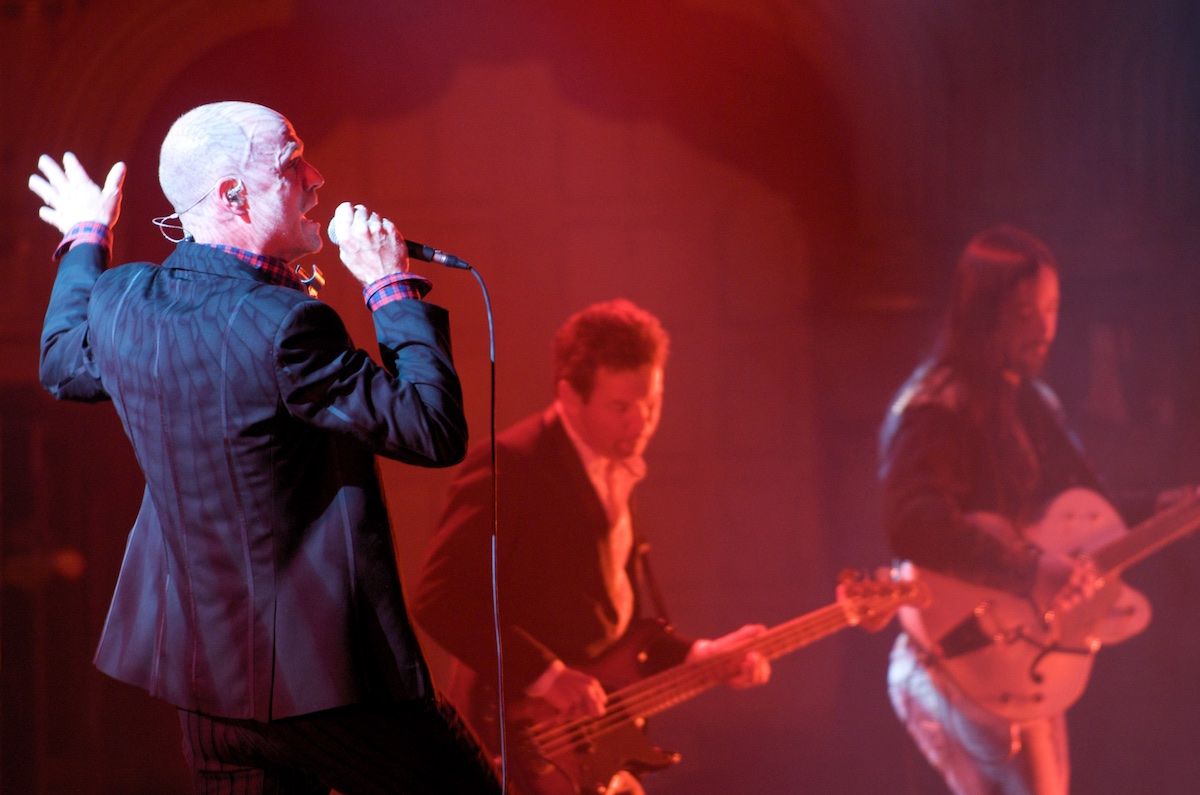
Canadian band the Tragically Hip topped the RPM chart for two nonconsecutive weeks in June and July with "Ahead by a Century".

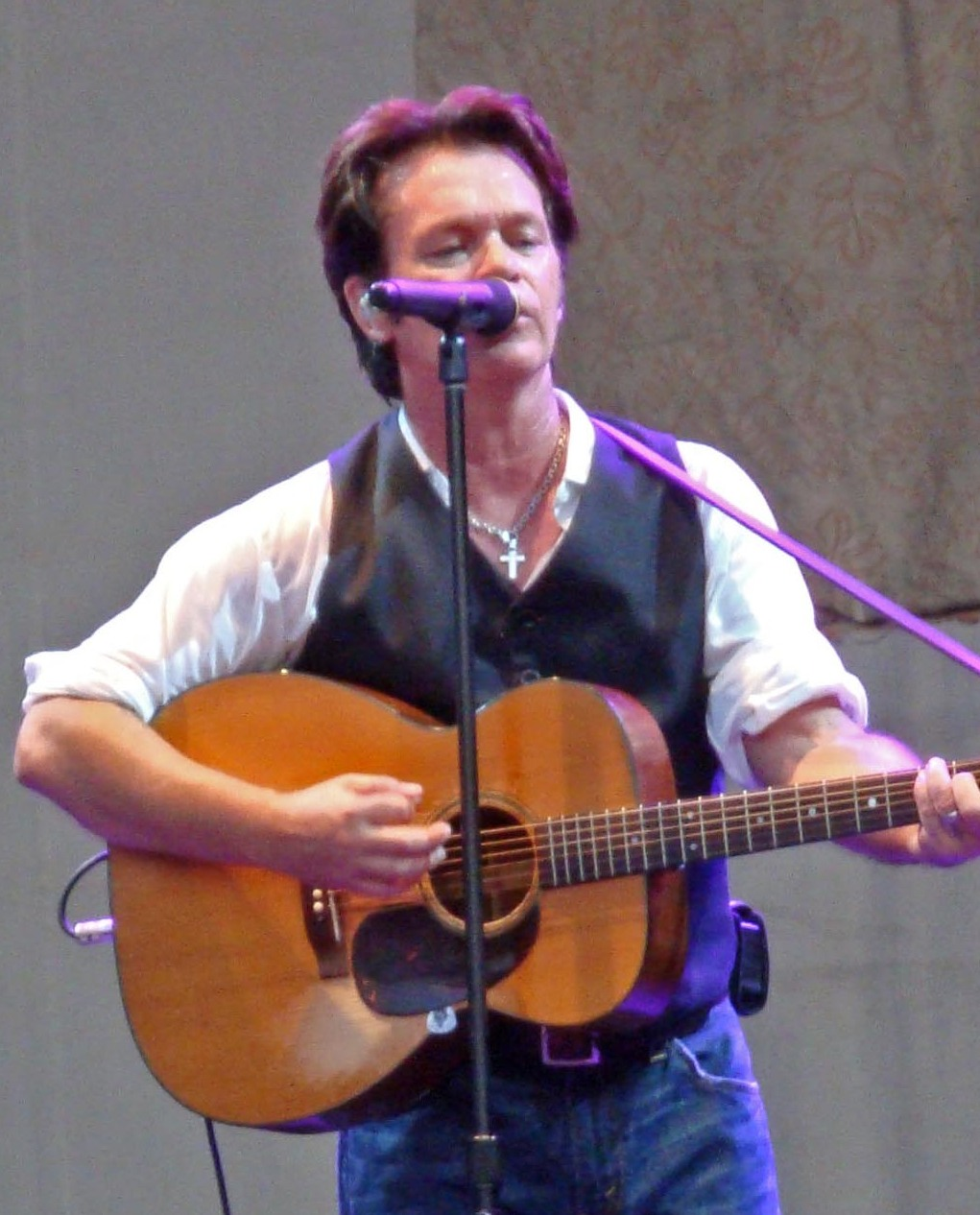
John Mellencamp remained atop the chart for five weeks in 1996 with his fourth Canadian number one, "Key West Intermezzo (I Saw You First)".

Issue date	Song	Artist	Reference
1 January (Note: Due to a two-week break in publication over the 1995/1996 Christmas/New Year period, the week of 1 January is inferred.)	"Hand in My Pocket"	Alanis Morissette	
8 January	"Exhale (Shoop Shoop)"	Whitney Houston	
15 January	"Exhale (Shoop Shoop)"	Whitney Houston	
22 January	"One Sweet Day"	Mariah Carey and Boyz II Men	
29 January	"One Sweet Day"	Mariah Carey and Boyz II Men	
5 February	"One of Us"	Joan Osborne	
12 February	"Time"	Hootie & the Blowfish	
19 February	"Missing"	Everything but the Girl	
26 February	"Missing"	Everything but the Girl	
4 March	"Missing"	Everything but the Girl	
11 March	"The World I Know"	Collective Soul	
18 March	"I Want to Come Over"	Melissa Etheridge	
25 March	"Follow You Down"	Gin Blossoms	
1 April	"Ironic"	Alanis Morissette	
8 April	"Ironic"	Alanis Morissette	
15 April	"Ironic"	Alanis Morissette	
22 April	"Ironic"	Alanis Morissette	
29 April	"Ironic"	Alanis Morissette	
6 May	"Ironic"	Alanis Morissette	
13 May	"Closer to Free"	BoDeans	
20 May	"Always Be My Baby"	Mariah Carey	
27 May	"Old Man & Me (When I Get to Heaven)"	Hootie & the Blowfish	
3 June	"Old Man & Me (When I Get to Heaven)"	Hootie & the Blowfish	
10 June	"Old Man & Me (When I Get to Heaven)"	Hootie & the Blowfish	
17 June	"Give Me One Reason"	Tracy Chapman	
24 June	"Ahead by a Century"	The Tragically Hip	
1 July	"You Learn"†	Alanis Morissette	
8 July	"Ahead by a Century"	The Tragically Hip	
15 July	"The Only Thing That Looks Good on Me Is You"	Bryan Adams	
22 July	"You Learn"†	Alanis Morissette	
29 July	"You Learn"†	Alanis Morissette	
5 August	"Change the World"	Eric Clapton	
12 August	"Change the World"	Eric Clapton	
19 August	"Change the World"	Eric Clapton	
26 August	"Change the World"	Eric Clapton	
2 September	"Change the World"	Eric Clapton	
9 September	"Key West Intermezzo (I Saw You First)"	John Mellencamp	
16 September	"Key West Intermezzo (I Saw You First)"	John Mellencamp	
23 September	"Key West Intermezzo (I Saw You First)"	John Mellencamp	
30 September	"Key West Intermezzo (I Saw You First)"	John Mellencamp	
7 October	"Key West Intermezzo (I Saw You First)"	John Mellencamp	
14 October	"Let's Make a Night to Remember"	Bryan Adams	
21 October	"Let's Make a Night to Remember"	Bryan Adams	
28 October	"It's All Coming Back to Me Now"	Celine Dion	
4 November	"It's All Coming Back to Me Now"	Celine Dion	
11 November	"If It Makes You Happy"	Sheryl Crow	
18 November	"Head over Feet"	Alanis Morissette	
25 November	"Head over Feet"	Alanis Morissette	
2 December	"Head over Feet"	Alanis Morissette	
9 December	"Head over Feet"	Alanis Morissette	
16 December	"Head over Feet"	Alanis Morissette	
23 December (Note: Due to a three-week break in publication over the 1996/1997 Christmas/New Year period, the weeks of 23 December and 30 December are inferred.)	"Head over Feet"	Alanis Morissette	
30 December	"Head over Feet"	Alanis Morissette	

== See also ==
- 1996 in music
- List of number-one albums of 1996 (Canada)
- List of RPM number-one adult contemporary singles of 1996
- List of RPM number-one alternative rock singles of 1996
- List of RPM number-one country singles of 1996
- List of RPM number-one dance singles of 1996
- List of Billboard Hot 100 number-one singles of 1996
- List of Cash Box Top 100 number-one singles of 1996
