= Falling into You: Around the World =

1996–1997 concert tour by Celine Dion

- World tour by Celine Dion
- Promotional handbill for the tour
- Location: Oceania; North America; Europe; Asia
- Associated album: Falling into You
- Start date: 18 March 1996
- End date: 26 June 1997
- No. of shows: 145

Celine Dion concert chronology
- D'eux Tour (1995–1996); Falling into You: Around the World (1996–1997); Let's Talk About Love World Tour (1998–1999)

Falling into You: Around the World was the eighth concert tour by Canadian singer Celine Dion, launched to support her fourth English‑language studio album, Falling into You (1996). Spanning North America, Europe, and Asia, the tour became the most extensive of Dion's career, comprising 145 performances and attracting large audiences across multiple continents. Designed to present material from Falling into You—an album that would go on to sell more than 32 million copies worldwide—the tour also incorporated selections from Dion's earlier repertoire.

== Background ==
In February 1996, Dion announced a global concert tour in support of her album Falling into You, with performances initially planned across Asia, Australia, Europe, and North America. The tour ultimately expanded into an international concert venture lasting more than a year, comprising 145 shows in 17 countries—making it the most extensive concert tour of her career in terms of total performances.

The tour began on 18 March 1996 in Perth, Australia, and concluded on 28 June 1997 in Nice, France. During the final European leg in June 1997, Dion performed for some of the largest audiences she had attracted up to that point, with attendance figures ranging from 35,000 to 70,000 people. Total worldwide attendance for the tour is estimated at approximately 1.7 million.

== Opening acts ==
- Soul Attorneys (select North American dates, summer 1996)
- Jamie Porter (Tampa – 11 March 1997)
- Keb' Mo' (select US dates)
- The Corrs (select North American dates, August 1996; Europe, autumn 1996)
- Mike and the Mechanics
- Human Nature (Australia – March 1996; Europe – June 1997)

== Set list ==
The following set list is taken from the 1996 US leg of the tour and does not represent all concerts.

1. "Everybody's Talkin' My Baby Down"
2. "The Power of Love"
3. "Falling into You"
4. "Make You Happy"
5. "River Deep, Mountain High"
6. "Seduces Me"
7. "All by Myself"
8. "Pour que tu m'aimes encore"
9. "J'irai où tu iras"
10. "If You Asked Me To"
11. "Beauty and the Beast"
12. "When I Fall in Love"
13. "Where Does My Heart Beat Now"
14. "Misled"
15. "Declaration of Love"
16. "It's All Coming Back to Me Now"
17. "To Love You More"
18. "Le ballet"
19. "Love Can Move Mountains"
20. "Fly"
21. "Call the Man"
22. "The Power of the Dream"
23. "Twist and Shout"
24. "Because You Loved Me"

=== Notes ===
- During the European leg, Dion added "Think Twice", "Only One Road", and "(You Make Me Feel Like) A Natural Woman".
- In French-speaking countries, additional French-language songs were included.

== Tour dates ==
List of 1996 concerts
Date (1996)	City	Country	Venue	Opening act(s)	Attendance	Revenue
18 March	Perth	Australia	Perth Entertainment Centre	Human Nature	—N/a	—N/a
21 March	Adelaide	Australia	Adelaide Entertainment Centre	Human Nature	—N/a	—N/a
22 March	Melbourne	Australia	Centre Court	Human Nature	—N/a	—N/a
23 March	Melbourne	Australia	Centre Court	Human Nature	—N/a	—N/a
25 March	Sydney	Australia	Sydney Entertainment Centre	Human Nature	—N/a	—N/a
26 March	Sydney	Australia	Sydney Entertainment Centre	Human Nature	—N/a	—N/a
28 March	Newcastle	Australia	Newcastle Entertainment Centre	Human Nature	—N/a	—N/a
30 March	Brisbane	Australia	Brisbane Entertainment Centre	Human Nature	—N/a	—N/a
1 April	Auckland	New Zealand	ASB Auditorium	—N/a	—N/a	—N/a
18 May	Vancouver	Canada	General Motors Place	—N/a	—N/a	—N/a
20 May	Calgary	Canada	Canadian Airlines Saddledome	—N/a	—N/a	—N/a
21 May	Edmonton	Canada	Edmonton Coliseum	—N/a	—N/a	—N/a
23 May	Saskatoon	Canada	Saskatchewan Place	—N/a	—N/a	—N/a
25 May	Winnipeg	Canada	Winnipeg Arena	—N/a	—N/a	—N/a
26 May	Thunder Bay	Canada	Fort William Gardens	—N/a	—N/a	—N/a
28 May	Sudbury	Canada	Sudbury Community Arena	—N/a	—N/a	—N/a
29 May	Hamilton	Canada	Copps Coliseum	—N/a	—N/a	—N/a
31 May	Ottawa	Canada	Corel Centre	—N/a	—N/a	—N/a
1 June	Ottawa	Canada	Corel Centre	—N/a	—N/a	—N/a
5 June	Saguenay	Canada	Palais des Sports de Saguenay	—N/a	—N/a	—N/a
7 June	Quebec City	Canada	Colisée de Québec	—N/a	—N/a	—N/a
8 June	Quebec City	Canada	Colisée de Québec	—N/a	—N/a	—N/a
12 June	Halifax	Canada	Halifax Metro Centre	—N/a	—N/a	—N/a
13 June	Sydney	Canada	Centre 200	—N/a	—N/a	—N/a
15 June	Moncton	Canada	Moncton Coliseum	—N/a	—N/a	—N/a
16 June	Saint John	Canada	Harbour Station	—N/a	—N/a	—N/a
18 June	Montreal	Canada	Molson Centre	—N/a	—N/a	—N/a
19 June	Montreal	Canada	Molson Centre	—N/a	—N/a	—N/a
20 June	Montreal	Canada	Molson Centre	—N/a	—N/a	—N/a
22 June	Toronto	Canada	Molson Amphitheatre	Soul Attorneys	18,349 / 18,349	$509,482
23 June	Toronto	Canada	Molson Amphitheatre	Soul Attorneys	18,349 / 18,349	$509,482
23 July	Mansfield	United States	Great Woods Center for the Performing Arts	—N/a	—N/a	—N/a
24 July	Hartford	United States	Meadows Music Theatre	—N/a	—N/a	—N/a
26 July	Wantagh	United States	Jones Beach Theater	—N/a	—N/a	—N/a
27 July	Holmdel	United States	PNC Bank Arts Center	—N/a	—N/a	—N/a
29 July	New York City	United States	The Theater at Madison Square Garden	Soul Attorneys	5,345 / 5,345	$274,435
30 July	Philadelphia	United States	Mann Center for the Performing Arts	—N/a	—N/a	—N/a
1 August	Darien	United States	Darien Lake Performing Arts Center	Soul Attorneys	6,140 / 6,509	$169,248
2 August	Cuyahoga Falls	United States	Blossom Music Center	—N/a	—N/a	—N/a
4 August	Columbus	United States	Polaris Amphitheater	—N/a	—N/a	—N/a
5 August	Vienna	United States	Wolf Trap Filene Center	Soul Attorneys	7,034 / 7,034	$178,202
7 August	Noblesville	United States	Deer Creek Music Center	The Corrs	6,176 / 18,000	$159,190
8 August	Clarkston	United States	Pine Knob Music Theatre	The Corrs	—N/a	—N/a
10 August	Cincinnati	United States	Riverbend Music Center	The Corrs	—N/a	—N/a
11 August	Tinley Park	United States	New World Music Theatre	The Corrs	9,378 / 15,000	$236,887
13 August	Atlanta	United States	Chastain Park Amphitheater	The Corrs	—N/a	—N/a
15 August	The Woodlands	United States	Cynthia Woods Mitchell Pavilion	The Corrs	—N/a	—N/a
16 August	Dallas	United States	Reunion Arena	The Corrs	—N/a	—N/a
18 August	Maryland Heights	United States	Riverport Amphitheatre	The Corrs	—N/a	—N/a
19 August	Bonner Springs	United States	Sandstone Amphitheater	The Corrs	—N/a	—N/a
21 August	Denver	United States	Red Rocks Amphitheatre	The Corrs	6,219 / 9,450	$166,547
23 August	Las Vegas	United States	Circus Maximus Showroom	—N/a	—N/a	—N/a
24 August	Las Vegas	United States	Circus Maximus Showroom	—N/a	—N/a	—N/a
26 August	Los Angeles	United States	Universal Amphitheatre	Soul Attorneys	6,251 / 6,251	$226,365
28 August	Concord	United States	Concord Pavilion	—N/a	—N/a	—N/a
29 August	Mountain View	United States	Shoreline Amphitheatre	—N/a	—N/a	—N/a
20 September	Paris	France	Palais Omnisports de Paris-Bercy	—N/a	—N/a	—N/a
21 September	Paris	France	Palais Omnisports de Paris-Bercy	—N/a	—N/a	—N/a
22 September	Paris	France	Palais Omnisports de Paris-Bercy	—N/a	—N/a	—N/a
24 September	Paris	France	Palais Omnisports de Paris-Bercy	—N/a	—N/a	—N/a
25 September	Paris	France	Palais Omnisports de Paris-Bercy	—N/a	—N/a	—N/a
27 September	Lyon	France	Halle Tony Garnier	—N/a	—N/a	—N/a
28 September	Grenoble	France	Palais des Sports	—N/a	—N/a	—N/a
4 October	Nîmes	France	Arena of Nîmes	—N/a	—N/a	—N/a
6 October	Le Mans	France	Antarès	—N/a	—N/a	—N/a
7 October	Caen	France	Zénith de Caen	—N/a	—N/a	—N/a
9 October	Strasbourg	France	Strasbourg Rhénus	—N/a	—N/a	—N/a
10 October	Amnéville	France	Galaxie Amnéville	—N/a	—N/a	—N/a
12 October	Ghent	Belgium	Flanders Expo Center	The Corrs	—N/a	—N/a
13 October	Ghent	Belgium	Flanders Expo Center	The Corrs	—N/a	—N/a
15 October	Cologne	Germany	Sporthalle Köln	The Corrs	—N/a	—N/a
16 October	Frankfurt	Germany	Festhalle Frankfurt	The Corrs	—N/a	—N/a
18 October	Rotterdam	Netherlands	Sportpaleis van Ahoy	The Corrs	—N/a	—N/a
19 October	Rotterdam	Netherlands	Sportpaleis van Ahoy	The Corrs	—N/a	—N/a
21 October	Hamburg	Germany	Alsterdorfer Sporthalle	The Corrs	—N/a	—N/a
23 October	Copenhagen	Denmark	Forum Copenhagen	The Corrs	—N/a	—N/a
25 October	Stockholm	Sweden	Stockholm Globe Arena	The Corrs	—N/a	—N/a
26 October	Oslo	Norway	Sentrum Scene	The Corrs	—N/a	—N/a
28 October	Berlin	Germany	ICC Berlin	The Corrs	—N/a	—N/a
30 October	Milan	Italy	Forum di Assago	The Corrs	—N/a	—N/a
31 October	Lausanne	Switzerland	Patinoire de Malley	The Corrs	—N/a	—N/a
1 November	Geneva	Switzerland	SEG Geneva Arena	The Corrs	—N/a	—N/a
3 November	Zürich	Switzerland	Hallenstadion	The Corrs	—N/a	—N/a
4 November	Zürich	Switzerland	Hallenstadion	The Corrs	—N/a	—N/a
6 November	Neuchâtel	Switzerland	Patinoire du Littoral	The Corrs	—N/a	—N/a
7 November	Nuremberg	Germany	Frankenhalle	The Corrs	—N/a	—N/a
10 November	Liévin	France	Stade Couvert Régional	The Corrs	—N/a	—N/a
11 November	Cardiff	Wales	Cardiff International Arena	The Corrs	—N/a	—N/a
13 November	Sheffield	England	Sheffield Arena	The Corrs	—N/a	—N/a
14 November	Manchester	England	NYNEX Arena	The Corrs	—N/a	—N/a
16 November	London	England	Wembley Arena	The Corrs	—N/a	—N/a
17 November	London	England	Wembley Arena	The Corrs	—N/a	—N/a
19 November	Glasgow	Scotland	Scottish Exhibition and Conference Centre	The Corrs	—N/a	—N/a
20 November	Glasgow	Scotland	Scottish Exhibition and Conference Centre	The Corrs	—N/a	—N/a
22 November	Birmingham	England	NEC Arena	The Corrs	—N/a	—N/a
23 November	Birmingham	England	NEC Arena	The Corrs	—N/a	—N/a
25 November	Dublin	Ireland	Point Theatre	The Corrs	—N/a	—N/a
26 November	Dublin	Ireland	Point Theatre	The Corrs	—N/a	—N/a
28 November	London	England	Wembley Arena	The Corrs	—N/a	—N/a
29 November	London	England	Wembley Arena	The Corrs	—N/a	—N/a
17 December	Montreal	Canada	Molson Centre	—N/a	30,928 / 34,734	$1,106,457
18 December	Montreal	Canada	Molson Centre	—N/a	30,928 / 34,734	$1,106,457
19 December	Montreal	Canada	Molson Centre	—N/a	30,928 / 34,734	$1,106,457

List of 1997 concerts
Date (1997)	City	Country	Venue	Opening act(s)	Attendance	Revenue
2 February	Yokohama	Japan	Yokohama Arena	—N/a	—N/a	—N/a
3 February	Tokyo	Japan	Nippon Budokan	—N/a	—N/a	—N/a
6 February	Osaka	Japan	Osaka-Jo Hall	—N/a	—N/a	—N/a
7 February	Osaka	Japan	Osaka-Jo Hall	—N/a	—N/a	—N/a
10 February	Hiroshima	Japan	Hiroshima Green Arena	—N/a	—N/a	—N/a
11 February	Fukuoka	Japan	Marine Messe Fukuoka	—N/a	—N/a	—N/a
14 February	Tokyo	Japan	Nippon Budokan	—N/a	—N/a	—N/a
15 February	Tokyo	Japan	Nippon Budokan	—N/a	—N/a	—N/a
16 February	Tokyo	Japan	Nippon Budokan	—N/a	—N/a	—N/a
19 February	Nagoya	Japan	Nagoya Rainbow Hall	—N/a	—N/a	—N/a
21 February	Seoul	South Korea	Olympic Gymnastics Arena	—N/a	—N/a	—N/a
11 March	Tampa	United States	Ice Palace	Jamie Porter	11,333 / 11,333	$436,977
12 March	West Palm Beach	United States	Coral Sky Amphitheater	Keb' Mo'	17,332 / 18,784	$411,269
14 March	Memphis	United States	Mid-South Coliseum	Keb' Mo'	11,103 / 17,816	$416,445
15 March	Memphis	United States	Mid-South Coliseum	Keb' Mo'	11,103 / 17,816	$416,445
16 March	New Orleans	United States	UNO Lakefront Arena	Keb' Mo'	5,943 / 5,943	$239,865
18 March	Orlando	United States	Orlando Arena	Keb' Mo'	11,674 / 11,674	$447,150
25 March	Los Angeles	United States	Universal Amphitheatre	Keb' Mo'	5,724 / 5,724	$269,672
27 March	San Francisco	United States	Bill Graham Civic Auditorium	Keb' Mo'	—N/a	—N/a
29 March	Portland	United States	Rose Garden Arena	Keb' Mo'	6,576 / 6,576	$185,968
31 March	Seattle	United States	KeyArena	Keb' Mo'	12,523 / 12,523	$443,185
4 April	Pittsburgh	United States	Civic Arena	Keb' Mo'	13,142 / 13,142	$349,877
5 April	Atlantic City	United States	Etess Arena	—N/a	—N/a	—N/a
7 April	Boston	United States	FleetCenter	Keb' Mo'	15,508 / 15,508	$444,330
8 April	Ledyard	United States	MGM Grand Theater	—N/a	3,686 / 3,686	$236,725
12 April	New York City	United States	Madison Square Garden	Keb' Mo'	13,524 / 13,524	$624,260
25 April	Las Vegas	United States	Circus Maximus Showroom	—N/a	—N/a	—N/a
26 April	Las Vegas	United States	Circus Maximus Showroom	—N/a	—N/a	—N/a
27 April	Las Vegas	United States	Circus Maximus Showroom	—N/a	—N/a	—N/a
5 May	Montreal	Canada	Molson Centre		23,009 / 25,862	$827,613
6 May	Montreal	Canada	Molson Centre		23,009 / 25,862	$827,613
11 May	Montreal	Canada	Molson Centre		23,583 / 25,862	$843,822
12 May	Montreal	Canada	Molson Centre		23,583 / 25,862	$843,822
12 June	Dublin	Ireland	Lansdowne Road	Human Nature	—N/a	—N/a
14 June	London	England	Earls Court Exhibition Centre	Human Nature	—N/a	—N/a
15 June	London	England	Earls Court Exhibition Centre	Human Nature	—N/a	—N/a
18 June	Amsterdam	Netherlands	Amsterdam Arena	Human Nature	—N/a	—N/a
20 June	Brussels	Belgium	King Baudouin Stadium	Human Nature	—N/a	—N/a
22 June	Copenhagen	Denmark	Parken Stadium	Human Nature	—N/a	—N/a
24 June	Berlin	Germany	Waldbühne	Human Nature	—N/a	—N/a
26 June	Zurich	Switzerland	Letzigrund	Human Nature	—N/a	—N/a

== Broadcasts and recordings ==
The concerts held on 14–15 March 1997 at the Mid-South Coliseum in Memphis, Tennessee were filmed and later broadcast on television. The performance was released on VHS in November 1998. A DVD edition was scheduled for release in Japan on 27 February 2008, but the project was ultimately cancelled.

A 1996 concert in Zurich was recorded for promotional use as a live CD, with only a limited number of copies produced.

Concerts in both Australia and Montreal were also filmed and broadcast as television specials. The Australian program featured four songs along with interview segments in which Dion discussed the album. The Montreal special included six songs, and the performances of "All by Myself" and "To Love You More" were later released as live music videos.

== Personnel ==
- Celine Dion – lead vocals

=== Band ===
- Claude "Mego" Lemay – musical director, keyboards
- Dominique Messier – drums
- Marc Langis – bass
- Yves Frulla – keyboards
- André Coutu – guitars
- Paul Picard – percussion
- Taro Hakase – violin on "To Love You More"
- Terry Bradford – backing vocals
- Rachelle Jeanty – backing vocals (1996)
- Julie LeBlanc – backing vocals (1997)
- Elise Duguay – backing vocals, cello

=== Production ===
- René Angélil – management
- Bud Scheatzle – tour director
- Ian Donald – production director
- Michel Dion – assistant to the tour director
- Denis Savage – front-of-house sound engineer
- Daniel Baron – stage sound engineer
- François Desjardins – sound system technician
- Marc Beauchamp – sound system technician
- Marc Thériault – sound system technician
- Yves Aucoin – lighting director
- Normand Chassé – assistant lighting director
- Yves "Kiwwi" Lefebvre – video director
- Yves "Uncle Bill" Beriault – camera technician
- Louis Lefebvre – camera technician
- Jean-François Canuel – lighting technician
- Antoine Malette – lighting technician
- Michel Pommerleau – lighting technician
- Jean-François Dubois – band gear technician
- Guy Vignola – band gear technician
- Stéphane Hamel – band gear technician
- Tonje Wold – set design
- Donald Chouinard – set design
- Frédéric Morosovsky – head rigger
- Patrick Angélil – production assistant
- Louise Labranche – tour assistant
- Manon Dion – assistant to Céline
- Eric Burrows – bodyguard
- Louis Hechter – hairstylist
- Annie L. Horth – stylist
- Dominique Giraldeau – choreographer
- D-U-B-U-C mode de vie – musicians' wardrobe
