= Call the Man =

Single by Celine Dion

from the album Falling into You
- B-side: "Medley Starmania" (live at the Olympia)
- Released: 9 June 1997
- Studio: Hit Factory
- Genre: Pop
- Length: 6:08
- Label: Columbia; Epic
- Songwriters: Andy Hill; Peter Sinfield
- Producers: Jim Steinman; Steven Rinkoff; Jeff Bova

Celine Dion singles chronology
"All by Myself" (1996)	"Call the Man" (1997)	"J'attendais" (1997)

Audio
- "Call the Man" on YouTube

"Call the Man" is a song by Canadian singer Celine Dion, recorded for her fourth English-language album, Falling into You (1996). It was released by Columbia Records and Epic Records as the fifth and final single outside North America on 9 June 1997. Written by Andy Hill and Peter Sinfield, who had previously penned Dion's 1995 hit "Think Twice", the song was produced by Jim Steinman, also responsible for her earlier single "It's All Coming Back to Me Now". Its music video was directed by Greg Masuak. In 2008, "Call the Man" was included on the European edition of My Love: Ultimate Essential Collection.

== Critical reception ==
Pip Ellwood-Hughes of Entertainment Focus described the song as a "huge sing-a-long anthem". A reviewer for Music & Media called it an "epic ballad". Music Week gave it three out of five, describing it as "Streisand-esque warblings from Dion on this emotive Jim Steinman-produced ballad", and "not as memorable as 'Think Twice'". Bob Waliszewski of Plugged In wrote that the song, "which praises a nameless individual capable of calming the chaos and confusion in life with love beyond repair," could be interpreted as referring to Jesus. Ealing Leader noted that Dion is "in sad, wistful mood for this potent ballad". Christopher Smith of TalkAboutPopMusic described it as a "long and brooding epic [that] is full of theatrics and drama".

== Commercial performance ==
The single was released shortly before the start of the 1997 European leg of the Falling into You: Around the World tour and peaked at number eight in Ireland and number 11 in the United Kingdom, where it has sold over 80,000 copies.

== Music video ==
The accompanying music video for "Call the Man" was directed by Greg Masuak in 1995 and was previously used, in edited form, for "Je sais pas" and "Next Plane Out".

== Live performances ==
On 17 April 1997, Dion performed "Call the Man" with a 30-voice gospel choir during the World Music Awards ceremony. She was the main star of the evening, winning three awards: Best-selling Canadian Female Singer, Best-selling Artist, and Best-selling Pop Artist, after selling over 25 million albums in 1996. It was the second consecutive year in which she sold more than 20 million copies worldwide. Dion also performed the song during her 1996–97 Falling into You: Around the World tour.

== Formats and track listing ==
- European CD single
1. "Call the Man" (radio edit) – 4:15
2. "Medley Starmania" (live at the Olympia) – 6:33
- UK cassette single
1. "Call the Man" (radio edit) – 4:15
2. "Medley Starmania" (live at the Olympia) – 6:33
3. "Because You Loved Me" (live) – 4:49

- European and UK CD maxi-single
1. "Call the Man" (radio edit) – 4:15
2. "Medley Starmania" (live at the Olympia) – 6:33
3. "If We Could Start Over" – 4:23
4. "Refuse to Dance" – 4:22
- UK CD maxi-single #2
1. "Call the Man" (album version) – 6:08
2. "Little Bit of Love" – 4:26
3. "Did You Give Enough Love" – 4:20
4. "Because You Loved Me" (live) – 4:49

== Credits and personnel ==
Credits adapted from the liner notes of Falling into You:

- Celine Dion – lead vocals
- Jeff Bova – keyboards, drum programming
- Ottmar Liebert – acoustic guitar
- Shelton Becton – backing vocals
- Sharon Bryant-Gallwey – backing vocals
- Angela Clemmons-Patrick – backing vocals
- Curtis King – backing vocals

== Charts ==
=== Weekly charts ===
Weekly chart performance
Chart (1997)	Peak position
Belgium (Ultratop 50 Flanders)	45
Belgium (Ultratop 50 Wallonia)	26
Europe (Eurochart Hot 100)	68
Iceland (Íslenski Listinn Topp 40)	7
Ireland (IRMA)	8
Israel (Israeli Singles Chart)	19
Netherlands (Dutch Top 40 Tipparade)	5
Netherlands (Single Top 100)	69
Scottish Singles Sales (Official Charts)	14
UK Singles (Official Charts)	11
UK Airplay (Music Week)	24

=== Year-end charts ===
Year-end chart performance
Chart (1997)	Position
Iceland (Íslenski Listinn Topp 40)	40
UK Singles (OCC)	194

== Release history ==
Release history
Region	Date	Format	Ref.
United Kingdom	9 June 1997	Cassette; CD	
