= Falling into You =

1996 studio album by singer Celine Dion

Studio album by Celine Dion
- Released: 11 March 1996
- Recorded: 1995–1996
- Studios: Capitol (Hollywood); Compass Point (Nassau); Cove City Sound; Hum Inc. Productions; L.I. New York; MEGA; Dream Factory (New York); Hit Factory (New York); Power Station (New York); Record Plant (Los Angeles); Westlake (Los Angeles)
- Genre: Pop
- Length: 75:54
- Labels: Columbia; Epic
- Producers: David Foster; Humberto Gatica; Jean-Jacques Goldman; Rick Hahn; Dan Hill; John Jones; Rick Nowels; Aldo Nova; Billy Steinberg; Jim Steinman; Ric Wake

Celine Dion chronology
D'eux (1995)	Falling into You (1996)	Live à Paris (1996)

Singles from Falling into You
- 1. "Falling into You" Released: 19 February 1996; 2. "Because You Loved Me" Released: 19 February 1996 (US); 3. "It's All Coming Back to Me Now" Released: 30 July 1996; 4. "All by Myself" Released: 9 December 1996; 5. "Call the Man" Released: 9 June 1997

Falling into You is the fourteenth studio album and fourth English‑language release by Canadian singer Celine Dion. Issued on 11 March 1996 by Columbia Records and Epic Records, the album marked a significant point in Dion's career. Following the global success of The Colour of My Love (1993) and the French‑language album D'eux (1995), Falling into You expanded her musical scope through a wide range of collaborators, styles, and production approaches.

The album includes work from 14 producers, reflecting an effort to broaden Dion's sound. Among them were Jim Steinman, who wrote and produced the power ballad "It's All Coming Back to Me Now", and David Foster, who oversaw several tracks including the international hit "Because You Loved Me", written by Diane Warren. The project blends pop, soft rock, and adult contemporary elements, drawing on contributions from international songwriters and musicians.

Falling into You received widespread critical acclaim and earned many major awards. At the 39th Grammy Awards, it won both Album of the Year and Best Pop Album, with Dion performing during the ceremony. In April 1997, she received three World Music Awards—World's Best‑Selling Artist of the Year, World's Best‑Selling Pop Artist of the Year, and World's Best‑Selling Canadian Artist of the Year. The album is also included on the Rock and Roll Hall of Fame's Definitive 200 list.

Commercially, Falling into You became Dion's best‑selling album and one of the best‑selling albums of all time, with global sales exceeding 32 million copies. It has been certified diamond, multi‑platinum, platinum, or gold in numerous territories. In the United States, it sold over 12 million copies; in the United Kingdom, more than two million; and in Germany, France, Canada, and Australia, over one million each. Across Europe, cumulative sales surpassed nine million units. The album topped charts worldwide—including in the United States, Canada, the United Kingdom, France, and Australia—and ranked among the best‑selling albums of both 1996 and 1997 in multiple markets.

The album produced several successful singles, with release strategies varying by region. Five singles were issued in Europe, four in Australia, and three in North America. The most commercially prominent were "Because You Loved Me", the theme song for the film Up Close & Personal starring Robert Redford and Michelle Pfeiffer (number one in the United States and Australia; number two in Canada and Ireland); "It's All Coming Back to Me Now" (number one in Canada and the Flanders region of Belgium; number two in Ireland and the United States); and Dion's cover of Eric Carmen's "All by Myself", which reached the top 10 in several countries, including number four in the United States.

== Conception and composition ==
Falling into You was developed at a time when Dion had reached broad international recognition, and the album marked a shift in her musical approach. Its production draws on a wide range of stylistic elements, incorporating elaborate orchestral arrangements, African‑influenced vocal work, and an assortment of instruments, including violin, Spanish guitar, trombone, the cavaquinho, saxophone, and large string sections. This variety resulted in a sound that was more expansive than on her earlier English‑language albums. The singles also cover several genres: "Falling into You" (first recorded by Marie-Claire D'Ubaldo) and Dion's cover of "River Deep – Mountain High" by Ike & Tina Turner use rhythm‑focused arrangements, while "It's All Coming Back to Me Now" (originally recorded by Pandora's Box) and her version of Eric Carmen's "All by Myself" maintain their soft‑rock origins with added classical piano passages and dramatic orchestration.

The ballad "Because You Loved Me", written by Diane Warren, served as the theme song for the 1996 film Up Close & Personal. The album also includes English adaptations of three songs from Dion's French‑language album D'eux: "If That's What It Takes" ("Pour que tu m'aimes encore"), "I Don't Know" ("Je sais pas"), and "Fly" ("Vole"). Several regional editions contain additional recordings: outside North America, the album includes a cover of Carole King's "(You Make Me Feel Like) A Natural Woman"; the Asian edition adds the Japanese hit "To Love You More"; non‑US editions include "Your Light", written and produced by Aldo Nova; and Spanish‑language markets received "Sola Otra Vez", a Spanish adaptation of "All by Myself".

Dion worked with a large group of producers and arrangers, including Jim Steinman, David Foster, Ric Wake, Jean-Jacques Goldman, and Humberto Gatica. Their combined work shaped an album that blended mainstream pop with theatrical, classical, and international influences, contributing to Dion's standing as one of the decade's most prominent vocal performers.

== Singles ==
Two singles were issued in February 1996 to launch the album: "Falling into You" in Europe and Australia, and "Because You Loved Me" in North America, South America, and Asia. In May 1996, "Because You Loved Me" was also released as the second single in Europe and Australia. "Falling into You" topped the chart in Spain, reached number eight in Norway and number 10 in the United Kingdom, and entered the top 40 in several other territories. "Because You Loved Me" achieved broader international success, reaching number one in the United States, Canada, and Australia, and entering the top 10 in many markets worldwide, including number five in the UK. It earned triple‑platinum certification in Canada, double‑platinum certifications in the United States, the United Kingdom, and Australia, platinum in New Zealand and Denmark, and gold in Germany and Spain.

"It's All Coming Back to Me Now" was released as the second North American single in July 1996. It became a major hit, topping the chart in Canada and peaking at number two in the United States. In September 1996, the song was issued as the third single in most European countries and in Australia, while in France and Germany it served as the fourth single in early 1997. Internationally, it reached number one in Belgium and entered the top 10 in several markets, including number three in the UK. It was certified triple platinum in Canada, double platinum in the United States and the United Kingdom, platinum in New Zealand, and gold in Australia, Denmark, and Belgium.

"All by Myself" was released as the third single in France and Germany in October 1996. Across the rest of Europe, it followed as the fourth single in December 1996, after "It's All Coming Back to Me Now". It was also issued as the fourth single in Australia in February 1997 and as the third single in North America in March 1997. The song became another international success, reaching number four in the United States and entering the top 10 in several other countries, including number six in the United Kingdom. It achieved platinum status in Canada, gold in the United States, the United Kingdom, and New Zealand, and silver in France. The fifth European single, "Call the Man", was released in June 1997, peaking at number eight in Ireland and number 11 in the UK, with more limited results elsewhere.

Asian editions of Falling into You included "To Love You More", a 1995 hit that topped the chart in Japan and sold 1.3 million copies there. Editions released outside North America included "(You Make Me Feel Like) A Natural Woman", which had been issued as a promotional single in several countries from Tapestry Revisited: A Tribute to Carole King in November 1995. Limited Australian and Asian editions of Falling into You with a bonus disc also included "The Power of the Dream", performed by Dion at the opening ceremony of the 1996 Summer Olympics. "The Power of the Dream" was released as a single in Japan in August 1996, where it reached number 30 and was certified gold. Additionally, three further promotional singles were issued from the album: "Dreamin' of You" in Mexico, "Make You Happy" in Brazil, and "River Deep, Mountain High" in France.

== Promotion ==
Dion supported Falling into You with the Falling into You: Around the World tour, which began in Perth, Australia, on 18 March 1996 and concluded in Zürich, Switzerland, on 26 June 1997. The tour covered multiple continents over fifteen months. It included dates in Australia in March 1996, Canada in May and June, the United States between July and August, and Europe from September to November. Dion returned to Canada in December 1996, performed in Asia in February 1997, toured the United States again in March and April, revisited Canada in May, and ended with additional European dates in June 1997. One of the concerts was recorded and released on VHS in selected countries as ...Live in Memphis 1997.

Dion also promoted the album on television, particularly in the United States. She performed "Because You Loved Me" on The Tonight Show with Jay Leno, the Blockbuster Entertainment Awards, and Live with Regis and Kathie Lee in March 1996. She sang the song on the Late Show with David Letterman in April, and on Good Morning America and The Oprah Winfrey Show in May. Dion introduced her next US single, "It's All Coming Back to Me Now", on The Tonight Show with Jay Leno in July 1996 and on The Rosie O'Donnell Show in September. On 19 July 1996, she performed "The Power of the Dream" live at the opening ceremony of the 1996 Summer Olympics in Atlanta, United States.

In December 1996, Dion performed her third US single, "All by Myself", at the Billboard Music Awards and again on The Tonight Show with Jay Leno. She also sang it at the 39th Annual Grammy Awards on 26 February 1997. Additional promotional appearances included "Seduces Me" on The Rosie O'Donnell Show in January 1997 and "(You Make Me Feel Like) A Natural Woman" on the Late Show with David Letterman in February. In March 1997, Dion performed "Because You Loved Me" and "Fly" on The Oprah Winfrey Show, and later that month she sang "Because You Loved Me" and "I Finally Found Someone" at the 69th Academy Awards.

International promotion was also extensive. Dion performed "Falling into You" at the Sanremo Music Festival in Italy in March 1996, and "Because You Loved Me" on the Dutch programs Vijf TV Show and Tros in April. In May, she performed "Because You Loved Me" at the World Music Awards in Monte Carlo, Monaco, and on the German show Verstehen Sie Spaß?, as well as "Falling into You" on the French program Dimanche Martin.

In November 1996, Dion performed "All by Myself" at the Bambi Awards in Germany, and later that month sang both "All by Myself" and "River Deep, Mountain High" on Taratata in France. In December, she performed "All by Myself" on the French television show Les Années Tubes. In March 1997, Dion sang "To Love You More" with violinist Taro Hakase at the Juno Awards, and in April she performed the song again with Hakase on the Japanese program Music Fair, as well as "Call the Man" at the World Music Awards in Monte Carlo.

== Critical reception ==
Professional ratings
Review scores
Source	Rating
AllMusic	4/5 stars
Entertainment Weekly	B
Los Angeles Times	2/4 stars
Music Week	5/5 stars
NME	3/10
Rolling Stone Album Guide	1.5/5 stars

Falling into You received generally positive reviews, with many critics praising Dion's vocal ability, the album's production, and its mix of contemporary pop, soft rock, and ballads. Billboard published two favorable reviews. Editor Paul Verna described Falling into You as a confident release that reinforced Dion's position in mainstream pop. He noted the album's broad production approach and pointed to several tracks as highlights, including "Because You Loved Me", the dramatic "It's All Coming Back to Me Now", the title track, "Make You Happy", "Seduces Me", and "Declaration of Love". Larry Flick, also writing for Billboard, offered similar praise in multiple reviews. He described "Because You Loved Me" as a sweeping ballad with a strong emotional build. Flick also commended Dion's performance on "It's All Coming Back to Me Now", writing that although Jim Steinman's production is deliberately grand, Dion delivers a performance that matches its scale.

Senior editor Stephen Thomas Erlewine of AllMusic awarded the album four out of five stars. He considered it somewhat formulaic but praised its polished sound, melodic strength, and Dion's vocal presence. He highlighted ballads such as "Because You Loved Me" and the "mock epic" "It's All Coming Back to Me Now", concluding that Dion's delivery helps unify the material and results in one of her strongest albums. Entertainment Weekly critic Chuck Eddy gave the album a B, noting the variety in its arrangements, which include Spanish guitar, African‑influenced vocals, and orchestral elements. He singled out Dion's version of "All by Myself" and described "Declaration of Love" as a lively track with blues influences. Some reviewers were more reserved. Elysa Gardner of the Los Angeles Times wrote that parts of the album returned to familiar pop ballad territory, while The New York Times critic Stephen Holden described some tracks as relying on established formulas, though he praised "Because You Loved Me" and Dion's interpretation of "All by Myself". Dan Leroy of Yahoo Music viewed Dion's collaborations with Steinman as ambitious but felt they did not depart significantly from her earlier work. Less impressed, Mike Goldsmith from NME gave Falling Into You a harsh 3/10, criticizing its polished, sentimental production and repetitive themes. He described the album as overly schmaltzy and lacking energy, arguing that Dion seemed caught between styles associated with Madonna, Whitney Houston, and Bonnie Tyler.

In a retrospective review, Pip Ellwood-Hughes of Entertainment Focus gave Falling Into You a highly positive review, praising Dion's extraordinary vocal range, power, and emotional delivery. He described the album as "peak Celine Dion," emphasizing her ability to handle power ballads, uptempo pop, and near-operatic songs with ease. Likewise, Marc-André Lemieux from Le Journal de Montréal found the album to be a defining moment in Dion's career, praising its major hits, exceptional vocals, and acclaimed production. He highlighted the album's global success, two Grammy wins, and more than 32 million copies sold, while noting that some songs, such as "Make You Happy," have aged less well.

== Commercial performance ==
Falling into You became one of the major commercial successes of the 1990s and remains among the best-selling albums of all time. With more than 32 million copies sold worldwide, it was the best-selling album of 1996 globally and is the fourth best-selling album by a woman. Its commercial results further established Dion as one of the world's most successful recording artists.

=== Canada ===
In Canada, Falling into You continued Dion's strong chart presence, becoming her second number-one album after The Colour of My Love. It was certified diamond in November 1996 and has sold 1.6 million copies. It became her second diamond-certified release in the country, following The Colour of My Love, with her 1992 self-titled album later joining them in 1998. Falling into You also led the Quebec chart for 14 weeks.

=== United States ===
In the United States, Falling into You debuted at number two in March 1996 with first-week sales of 193,000 copies. It reached number one on the Billboard 200 in its 28th week and spent three non-consecutive weeks at the top. The album remained in the top 10 for 61 weeks, reflecting its long-term popularity.

Falling into You was the second best-selling album of 1996 in the US, with six million copies sold, and the eighth best-selling album of 1997 with an additional three million copies. It ended the decade as the fifth best-selling album of the 1990s in the United States, with 10,224,282 copies sold.

As of November 2019, Falling into You has sold 10.9 million copies in the US according to Nielsen SoundScan, with an additional 987,000 units sold through the BMG Music Club. It was certified diamond by the RIAA in December 1997 and twelve times platinum in 2021 for shipments exceeding 12 million copies.

=== UK, France and Germany ===
In the United Kingdom, Falling into You debuted at number one, becoming Dion's second chart-topping album after The Colour of My Love. In January 1998, it was certified seven times platinum by the BPI for sales of 2.1 million copies. In France, the album topped the chart for five non-consecutive weeks, became Dion's second number-one album after D'eux, and was certified diamond by the SNEP with 1.2 million copies sold. In Germany, it peaked at number five and earned five-times gold certification from the BVMI for sales of 1.3 million units. Across Europe, Falling into You received a nine-times Platinum Europe Award from the IFPI for sales exceeding nine million copies.

=== Australia and rest of the world ===
In Australia, the album debuted at number one and spent four non-consecutive weeks at the top, becoming Dion's second chart-topping release there. It was certified thirteen times platinum by the ARIA and has sold one million copies in the country. Falling into You also reached number one in several other international markets and received diamond, multi-platinum, platinum, and gold certifications worldwide. It sold more than 17 million copies globally between March and December 1996, a nine-month period that illustrates the album's rapid worldwide momentum.

== Accolades ==
At the 39th Annual Grammy Awards, Falling into You received two of the ceremony's top awards: Album of the Year and Best Pop Album. "Because You Loved Me" was nominated for Record of the Year, Best Female Pop Vocal Performance, and Song of the Year, and won the Grammy Award for Best Song Written Specifically for a Motion Picture or Television. Dion's commercial success was also acknowledged at the World Music Awards in 1997, where she received three awards: World's Best Selling Artist of the Year, World's Best Selling Pop Artist of the Year, and World's Best Selling Canadian Artist of the Year. She received further recognition at the American Music Awards, with nominations for Favorite Pop/Rock Female Artist and Favorite Adult Contemporary Artist in both 1997 and 1998, and won Favorite Pop/Rock Female Artist in January 1998.

At the Juno Awards of 1997, Dion received the Juno Award for Female Vocalist of the Year and the International Achievement Award. Falling into You won the Juno Award for Best Selling Album (Foreign or Domestic) and was nominated for Album of the Year, while "Because You Loved Me" was nominated for the Juno Award for Single of the Year.

Dion and Falling into You also received various international awards, including the IRMA Award for Best International Female Artist Album, the Bambi Award for Top International Pop Star of the Year, the Amigo Award for Best International Female Artist, the VH1 Award for Artist of the Year, and several NARM Best Seller Awards including Artist of the Year, Recording of the Year, Pop Recording of the Year, and Alternative Recording of the Year. She also received Félix Awards for Artist of the Year Achieving the Most Success Outside Quebec and Artist of the Year Achieving the Most Success in a Language Other Than French in both 1996 and 1997. Additional awards came from the Pop Corn Music Awards (Best Female Singer of the Year and Best Album of the Year), the Malta Music Awards (Best Selling International Artist), the National TV 2 Award (Best International Female Artist), the South African Music Awards (Best Selling International Album), the Coca-Cola Full Blast Music Award (Most Popular International Artist), the FM Select Diamond Award in Hong Kong (Top Female International Artist), and the International Achievement in Arts Award in the United States (Entertainer of the Year). "To Love You More", included on the Asian editions of Falling into You, won the International Single Grand Prix at the Japan Gold Disc Awards in 1996.

Dion received multiple nominations at the Billboard Music Awards in 1996 and 1997, including Top Pop Artist, Top Billboard 200 Album Artist, Hot 100 Singles Artist, Hot Adult Contemporary Artist, and Hot Adult Top 40 Artist. "Because You Loved Me" was nominated for Hot 100 Singles, Hot 100 Singles Airplay, Hot Adult Contemporary Singles & Tracks, and Hot Adult Top 40 Singles & Tracks, while Falling into You was nominated for Top Billboard 200 Album. She also received nominations at the Blockbuster Entertainment Awards for Favorite Female Artist – Pop and Favorite Song from a Movie ("Because You Loved Me"). At the 1997 BRIT Awards, Dion was nominated for Best International Female, and she received two nominations for Echo Awards for International Female Artist of the Year and two for the Danish Music Awards for Best International Female Singer. She was also nominated for the MuchMusic Video Award for Peoples Choice: Favourite International Artist.

"Because You Loved Me" was nominated for both the Academy Award for Best Original Song and the Golden Globe Award for Best Original Song. It also received an ASCAP Film and Television Music Award for Most Performed Song from Motion Picture and ASCAP Pop Awards for Most Performed Song in 1997, 1998, and 1999. "It's All Coming Back to Me Now" won a BMI Pop Award for Song of the Year, while both that song and "All by Myself" received BMI Pop Awards for Most Performed Songs. "The Power of the Dream", included on limited 2‑CD editions of Falling into You, won a BMI Film & TV Award in the category Special Recognition: The Olympic Tribute Award and was nominated for the Emmy Award for Outstanding Music and Lyrics.

== Cultural impact ==
Elle Canada described Falling into You as an album that "changed pop music forever", noting its influence on 1990s pop and its role in reinforcing the popularity of the power ballad. The publication stated that Dion, through Falling into You, helped renew interest in the style for the decade and influenced later vocalists such as Adele, Jennifer Hudson, Lady Gaga, and Ariana Grande.

Reader's Digest Canada placed Falling into You at number 22 on its list of the 25 Greatest Canadian Albums of All Time, describing it as "the most complete summation of her gifts as an entertainer: stylish, catchy and unabashedly emotional".

In 2014, Richard Dunn recorded a humorous video on his iPhone while stranded overnight at the Las Vegas airport, using Dion's 1996 version of "All by Myself". The clip went viral and drew renewed attention to the song's cultural presence.

The Colombian magazine Shock listed Dion among the most notable musical performers in the history of Olympic Games ceremonies. USA Today ranked her performance of The Power of the Dream at the Atlanta Games as the second‑best Olympic theme song of all time. On 19 July 1996, Dion performed the song during the Opening Ceremony for an estimated global audience of 3.5 billion viewers, a moment often cited as reinforcing her international profile.

In early 2022, Dion's hit "It's All Coming Back to Me Now" saw renewed popularity on TikTok, inspiring a series of viral videos. Participants included Michael Buble, Mandy Moore, Amanda Holden, Jordin Sparks, and Viola Davis.

In August 2024, Falling into You became Dion's first studio album to surpass one billion streams on Spotify, reflecting its continued popularity among listeners.

== Track listing ==
European / Australian edition
No.	Title	Writer(s)	Producer(s)	Length
1.	"It's All Coming Back to Me Now"	Jim Steinman	Steinman; Steven Rinkoff^{[a]}; Roy Bittan^{[a]}	7:37
2.	"Because You Loved Me"	Diane Warren	David Foster	4:33
3.	"Falling into You"	Billy Steinberg; Rick Nowels; Marie-Claire D'Ubaldo	Nowels; Steinberg	4:18
4.	"Make You Happy"	Andy Marvel	Ric Wake	4:31
5.	"Seduces Me"	Dan Hill; John Sheard	Rick Hahn; Hill; John Jones	3:46
6.	"All by Myself"	Eric Carmen; Sergei Rachmaninoff	Foster	5:12
7.	"Declaration of Love"	Michael Jay; Claude Gaudette	Wake	4:20
8.	"(You Make Me Feel Like) A Natural Woman"	Gerry Goffin; Carole King; Jerry Wexler	Foster	3:40
9.	"Dreamin' of You"	Aldo Nova; Peter Barbeau	Nova	5:07
10.	"I Love You"	Nova	Foster	5:30
11.	"If That's What It Takes"	Jean-Jacques Goldman; Phil Galdston	Goldman; Humberto Gatica	4:12
12.	"I Don't Know"	Goldman; J. Kapler; Galdston	Goldman; Gatica	4:38
13.	"River Deep, Mountain High"	Ellie Greenwich; Jeff Barry; Phil Spector	Steinman; Rinkoff^{[a]}	4:10
14.	"Your Light"	Nova	Nova	5:14
15.	"Call the Man"	Andy Hill; Peter Sinfield	Steinman; Rinkoff^{[a]}; Jeff Bova^{[a]}	6:08
16.	"Fly"	Goldman; Galdston	Goldman; Gatica	2:58
Total length:				75:54

=== Notes ===
- ^{^a} signifies a co‑producer
- "(You Make Me Feel Like) A Natural Woman" was omitted from the US, Canadian, and Japanese editions.
- "Your Light" was omitted from the US, Latin American, standard Asian (excluding Japanese), and certain Spanish editions, but included on the limited Asian edition.
- "To Love You More" was included on the Asian editions.
- "Sola Otra Vez" appeared on the Latin American and selected Spanish editions.
- "The Power of the Dream" was included on the limited Asian and Australian editions.

== Personnel ==
Credits are adapted from AllMusic.

- Celine Dion – lead vocals, background vocals
- Alain Couture – background vocals
- Alanna Capps – background vocals
- Aldo Nova – composer, drums, guest artist, guitar, percussion, synthesizer, background vocals
- Alex Brown – background vocals
- Andre Coutu – guitar
- Andy Hill – composer
- Andy Marvel – arranger, composer, drums, guitar, keyboards
- Andy Tarr – assistant engineer
- Angela Clemmons-Patrick – background vocals
- Antoine Russo – trumpet
- Arnaud Dunoyer de Ségonzac – piano
- Audrey Martells – background vocals
- Audrey Wheeler – background vocals
- Bashiri Johnson – percussion
- Basil Leroux – guitar
- Becky Bell – background vocals
- Bernie Schmitt – engineer
- Billy Porter – background vocals
- Billy Steinberg – composer, producer
- Bob Cadway – engineer
- Brandon Harris – assistant engineer
- Bridgette Bryant-Fiddmont – background vocals
- Camille Henry – production coordination
- Carl Carwell – vocal arrangement, background vocals
- Carole Fredericks – background vocals
- Charles Clouser – drum programming
- Charles Vasoll – assistant producer
- Christopher Deschamps – drums, saxophone
- Chris Brooke – assistant engineer, assistant producer, mixing assistant
- Chris Garcia – drum programming
- Chris Taylor – guitar
- Christian Martinez – trumpet
- Christophe Nègre – saxophone
- Claude Gaudette – composer
- Claude Lemay – keyboards
- Curt Bisquera – cymbals, hi-hat
- Curtis King – background vocals
- Dan Hetzel – mixing
- Dan Hill – composer, producer
- Dave Reitzas – engineer
- David Barratt – production coordination
- David Boruff – saxophone
- David Foster – arranger, guest artist, keyboards, piano, producer, vocal arrangement
- David Shackney – assistant engineer
- Denis Chartrand – piano, strings
- Denis Leloup – trombone
- Diane Warren – composer
- Dominique Messier – drums
- Don Ketteler – production coordination
- Dug – assistant engineer
- Eddie Martinez – guitar
- Elaine Caswell – background vocals
- Ellie Greenwich – composer
- Eric Benzi – engineer, Synclavier programming
- Eric Carmen – composer
- Eric Troyer – background vocals
- Felipe Elgueta – engineer
- Fonzi Thornton – background vocals
- G.W. Horn Machine – horns
- Gary Hasse – arranger, bass, conductor, producer
- George Bodnar – photography
- George Whitty – horns, keyboards
- Glen Burtnik – background vocals
- Glen Marchese – assistant engineer, mixing assistant
- Greg Pinto – assistant engineer, engineer
- Humberto Gatica – engineer, mixing, producer
- Jamie Muhoberac – keyboards
- Jay Anderson – acoustic bass
- Jean McClain – vocals
- Jean-Jacques Goldman – composer, producer
- Jeff Barry – composer
- Jeff Bova – arranger, bass, keyboards, producer, programming
- Jeff Pascetto – vocals
- Jeff Smallwood – acoustic guitar
- Jim Steinman – arranger, composer, guest artist, producer
- Jimmy Bralower – arranger, drums, percussion
- Johanne Gair – make-up
- John Genna – assistant engineer
- John Jones – engineer, producer, programming
- John Sheard – composer
- Jon Avnet – executive producer
- Josh Melville – assistant engineer
- Kasim Sulton – bass, background vocals
- Kenny Aronoff – drums
- Kofi – background vocals
- Kurt Lundvall – engineer
- Kyle Bess – assistant engineer
- Larry Schalit – assistant engineer
- Laura Harding – production coordination
- Louis Héchter – hair stylist
- Luis Conte – guest artist, percussion
- Manu Guiot – assistant engineer
- Maria Vidal – background vocals
- Marie Claire D'Ubaldo – composer, background vocals
- Mark Agostino – assistant engineer
- Mark Langis – bass
- Matthew "Boomer" La Monica – engineer
- Maxayn Lewis – background vocals
- Michael Jay – composer
- Michael Thompson – guitar
- Mickey Curry – drums
- Myriam Naomi Valle – background vocals
- Nancy Donald – art direction, design
- Nathan East – bass
- Neil Jason – bass
- Osie Bowe – assistant engineer
- Ottmar Liebert – guest artist, acoustic guitar
- Patrice Tison – guitar
- Paul Boutin – assistant engineer, engineer
- Paul Buckmaster – conductor, string arrangements
- Paul Bushnell – bass
- Paul Picard – percussion
- Pete Lorimer – drum programming
- Peter Barbeau – composer
- Peter Doell – assistant engineer
- Peter Sinfield – composer
- Phil Galdston – composer
- Phil Spector – composer
- Phillip Ingram – background vocals
- Randee Saint Nicholas – photography
- Rev. Dave Boruff – saxophone
- Ric Wake – producer
- Rick Hahn – producer, programming, strings
- Rick Kerr – mixing
- Rick Nowels – composer, guitar, keyboards, producer
- Robbie Buchanan – keyboards
- Robbyn Kirmsse – background vocals
- Rory Dodd – background vocals
- Roy Bittan – piano, piano arrangement, producer
- Russ DeSalvo – guitar
- Scott Young – assistant engineer
- Sharon Bryant-Gallaway – background vocals
- Sheila E. – guest artist, percussion
- Shelton Becton – background vocals
- Simon Franglen – programming, Synclavier programming
- Sisaundra – background vocals
- St. Jacques – bass, keyboards
- Steve Buslowe – bass
- Steve Churchyard – engineer
- Steve Farris – cavaquinho
- Steve Ferrone – drums
- Steve MacMillan – mixing
- Steve Rinkoff – engineer, producer
- Steve Skinner – keyboards
- Steve Wolf – drums
- Sue Ann Carwell – guest artist, vocal arrangement, background vocals
- Sylvain Beuf – saxophone
- Sylvain Bolduc – bass guitar
- Tawatha Agee – background vocals
- Terence Dover – engineer
- Terry Bradford – background vocals
- Thibault Vabre – make-up
- Tim Pierce – guitar
- Russ Powell – guitar
- Todd Rundgren – guest artist, vocal arrangement, background vocals
- Tony Phillips – mixing
- Vaneese Thomas – background vocals
- Vivian Turner – stylist
- Wil Wheaton – background vocals
- William Ross – string arrangements
- Yannick Hardouin – bass
- Yves Frulla – keyboards
- Yvone Jones – background vocals

== Charts ==
=== Weekly charts ===
Weekly chart performance
Chart (1996–1997)	Peak position
Australian Albums (ARIA)	1
Austrian Albums (Ö3 Austria)	1
Belgian Albums (Ultratop Flanders)	2
Belgian Albums (Ultratop Wallonia)	1
Canada Top Albums/CDs (RPM)	1
Canadian Albums (Billboard)	1
Czech Albums (ČNS IFPI)	18
Danish Albums (Hitlisten)	1
Dutch Albums (Album Top 100)	1
European Albums (Music & Media)	1
Finnish Albums (Suomen virallinen lista)	9
French Albums (SNEP)	1
German Albums (Offizielle Top 100)	5
Greek Albums (IFPI)	3
Hungarian Albums (MAHASZ)	13
Icelandic Albums (Tónlist)	10
Irish Albums (IRMA)	2
Italian Albums (FIMI)	4
Japanese Albums (Oricon)	6
Malaysian Albums (RIM)	2
New Zealand Albums (RMNZ)	1
Norwegian Albums (VG-lista)	1
Portuguese Albums (AFP)	2
Quebec (ADISQ)	1
Scottish Albums (Official Charts)	1
Spanish Albums (PROMUSICAE)	4
Swedish Albums (Sverigetopplistan)	1
Swiss Albums (Schweizer Hitparade)	1
Taiwanese International Albums (IFPI)	1
UK Albums (Official Charts)	1
US Billboard 200	1

=== Year-end charts ===
1996 year-end chart performance
Chart (1996)	Position
Australian Albums (ARIA)	2
Austrian Albums (Ö3 Austria)	2
Canada Top Albums/CDs (RPM)	2
Dutch Albums (Album Top 100)	1
European Albums (Music & Media)	2
French Albums (SNEP)	2
German Albums (Offizielle Top 100)	7
Japanese Albums (Oricon)	45
New Zealand Albums (RMNZ)	3
Norwegian Albums (VG-lista)	2
Norwegian Russefeiring Period Albums (VG-lista)	1
Spanish Albums (PROMUSICAE)	21
Swedish Albums (Sverigetopplistan)	10
Swiss Albums (Schweizer Hitparade)	2
UK Albums (OCC)	4
US Billboard 200	3

1997 year-end chart performance
Chart (1997)	Position
Australian Albums (ARIA)	9
Belgian Albums (Ultratop Flanders)	23
Belgian Albums (Ultratop Wallonia)	51
Canadian Albums (SoundScan)	15
Danish Albums (Hitlisten)	28
Dutch Albums (Album Top 100)	8
European Albums (Music & Media)	8
German Albums (Offizielle Top 100)	20
New Zealand Albums (RMNZ)	8
Norwegian Albums (VG-lista)	81
UK Albums (OCC)	27
US Billboard 200	3

1998 year-end chart performance
Chart (1998)	Position
Canadian Albums (SoundScan)	149
UK Albums (OCC)	109
US Billboard 200	144

=== Decade-end charts ===
Decade-end chart performance
Chart (1990–1999)	Position
Austrian Albums (Ö3 Austria)	10
UK Albums (OCC)	10
US Billboard 200	6

=== All-time charts ===
All-time chart performance
Chart	Position
Canadian Artists Albums (SoundScan)	9
Irish Albums Female Artists (OCC)	18
UK Albums (OCC)	57
UK Albums (Females) (OCC)	19
US Billboard 200	21
US Billboard 200 (Women)	11

== Certifications and sales ==
Certifications
Region	Certification	Certified units/sales
Argentina (CAPIF)	Platinum	75,000
Australia (ARIA)	13× Platinum	1,000,000
Austria (IFPI Austria)	2× Platinum	100,000^{*}
Belgium (BRMA)	4× Platinum	200,000^{*}
Brazil (Pro-Música Brasil)	Gold	200,000
Canada (Music Canada)	Diamond	1,600,000
Denmark (IFPI Danmark)	8× Platinum	160,000^{‡}
Finland (Musiikkituottajat)	Platinum	51,952
France (SNEP)	Diamond	1,000,000^{*}
Germany (BVMI)	5× Gold	1,250,000^{^}
Hungary (MAHASZ)	Gold	
Iceland	—	10,996
Italy	—	150,000
Japan (RIAJ)	4× Platinum	800,000^{^}
Malaysia	—	250,000
Mexico	—	150,000 (Note: Mexican sales as of November 1997.)
Netherlands (NVPI)	6× Platinum	600,000^{^}
New Zealand (RMNZ)	12× Platinum	180,000^{^}
New Zealand (RMNZ) digital	Gold	7,500^{‡}
Norway (IFPI Norway)	3× Platinum	150,000^{*}
Poland (ZPAV)	Platinum	100,000^{*}
Portugal (AFP)	2× Platinum	80,000^{^}
Singapore	—	120,000
South Africa	—	600,000
Spain (Promusicae)	2× Platinum	200,000^{^}
Sweden (GLF)	2× Platinum	200,000^{^}
Switzerland (IFPI Switzerland)	3× Platinum	150,000^{^}
Taiwan (RIT)	12× Platinum+Gold	633,518
Turkey (Mü-Yap)	Gold	20,000
United Kingdom (BPI)	7× Platinum	2,193,998
United States (RIAA)	12× Platinum	12,000,000^{‡}
Summaries
Europe (IFPI)	9× Platinum	9,000,000^{*}
Worldwide	—	32,000,000
^{*} Sales figures based on certification alone.^{^} Shipments figures based on certification alone.^{‡} Sales+streaming figures based on certification alone.

== Release history ==
Release history
Region	Date	Label	Format	Catalog
Australia	11 March 1996	Epic	CD; cassette	483792
Europe, United Kingdom	11 March 1996	Columbia, Epic	CD; LP; cassette	483792
United States	12 March 1996	550 Music	CD; cassette	67541
Canada	12 March 1996	Columbia	CD; cassette	33068
Japan	14 March 1996	SMEJ	CD	ESCA-6410
Japan	30 May 2018	SMEJ	Blu-spec CD2	SICP-31167
Various	12 October 2018	Columbia	LP	1-90758-63861-4

== See also ==
- Grammy Award for Album of the Year
- Grammy Award for Best Pop Vocal Album
- Juno Award for International Album of the Year
- List of best-selling albums
- List of best-selling albums by women
- List of best-selling albums in Australia
- List of best-selling albums in Europe
- List of best-selling albums in France
- List of best-selling albums in Germany
- List of best-selling albums in the Netherlands
- List of best-selling albums in New Zealand
- List of best-selling albums in the United States
- List of best-selling albums in the United States of the Nielsen SoundScan era
- List of best-selling albums of the 1990s in the United Kingdom
- List of Billboard 200 number-one albums of 1996
- List of Diamond-certified albums in Canada
- List of European number-one hits of 1996
- List of number-one albums from the 1990s (New Zealand)
- List of number-one albums in Australia during the 1990s
- List of number-one albums of 1996 (Canada)
- List of top 25 albums for 1996 in Australia
- List of top 25 albums for 1997 in Australia
- List of UK Albums Chart number ones of the 1990s
