= Mid-South Coliseum =

Arena in Tennessee, United States

- "The Entertainment Capital of the Mid-South" "The House that Lawler Built"
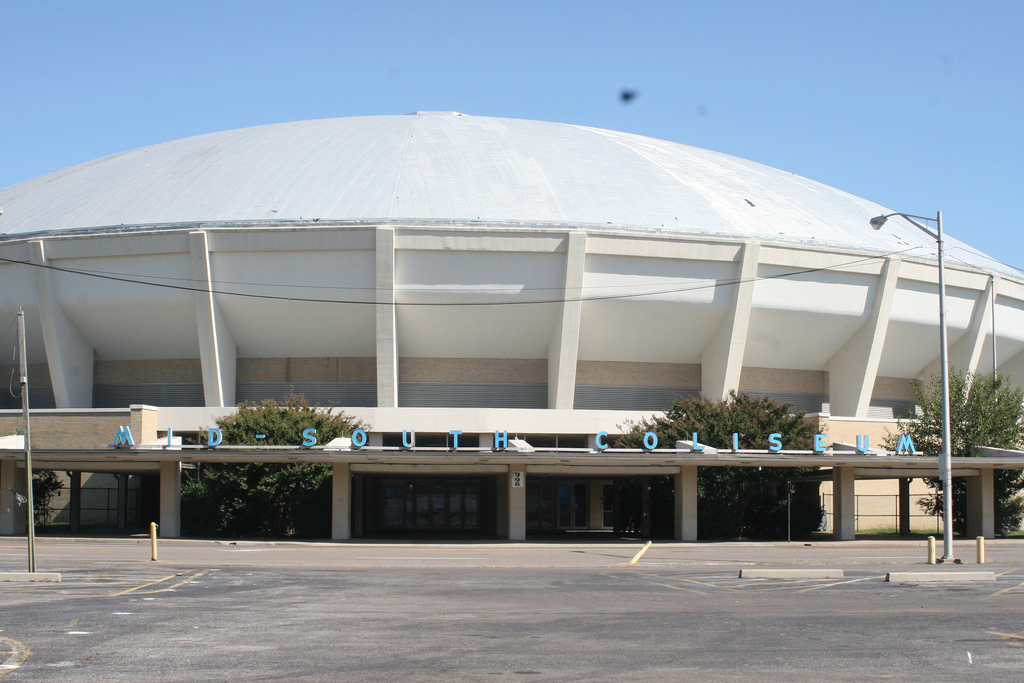
- Interactive map of Mid-South Coliseum
- Location: 996 Early Maxwell Blvd, Memphis, Tennessee, 38104
- Coordinates: 35°07′06″N 89°58′49″W
- Capacity: 10,085 permanent seats, 11,200 for basketball

Construction
- Groundbreaking: April 15, 1963
- Opened: October 1964
- Closed: 2006
- Architects: Merrill G. Ehrman (Furbringer and Ehrman); Robert Lee Hall (Robert Lee Hall & Associates)

Tenants
- Memphis Wings (CPHL) (1964–1967); Memphis Tigers (NCAA) (1966–1991); Memphis South Stars (CPHL) (1967–1969); Memphis Pros/Tams/Sounds (ABA) (1970–1975); Memphis Rogues (NASL) (1979–1980); Memphis Americans (MISL) (1981–1984); Memphis Rockers (WBL) (1990–1991); Memphis HotShots (GBA) (1991–1992); Memphis RiverKings (CHL) (1992–2000)

Website
- midsouthcoliseum.com

- Mid-South Coliseum
- U.S. National Register of Historic Places
- NRHP reference No.: 00001429
- Added to NRHP: December 6, 2000

Mid-South Coliseum is a defunct indoor arena in Memphis, Tennessee. The facility was opened in 1964, and became known "The Entertainment Capitol of the Mid-South" due its significance in hosting events such as concerts, sports games and professional wrestling shows. The Coliseum closed in 2006. In the late 2010s, efforts emerged to help preserve and refurbish the arena as part of a larger redevelopment of the surrounding area.

== History ==
Construction of the facility began on April 15, 1963. From its opening in October 1964, the Coliseum was the first racially desegregated facility in Memphis. Unlike many facilities in Memphis, which largely hesitated to integrate following the 1963 Watson v, United States U.S. Supreme Court case regarding local segregation, and which was also argued two days after construction began on the Mid South Coliseum, Mid South Coliseum management would not include any signs advising segregation.

=== Concerts ===
On November 17, 1965, The Rolling Stones played at Mid-South on their Out Of Our Heads tour. Patti LaBelle and The Bluebells opened for the British rockers on this night of their 2nd U.S. tour of 1965.

The arena was one of the few stops on The Beatles' final American tour in 1966. The group played two concerts there on August 19, 1966; in the wake of protests and boycotts of the band over John Lennon's controversial "more popular than Jesus" remarks, Memphis city council called for the cancellation of the concerts for safety reasons. The event still went on, although they were met by protests by the Ku Klux Klan, an anonymous assassination threat against "one or all" of the band's members, and an audience member exploding a firecracker on-stage during one of the performances (which was initially believed to be a gunshot).

Rod Stewart and The Faces played the Coliseum on April 21, 1972, along with the rock band Free.

Elvis Presley also performed at the arena. His first show was on March 16, 1974, which was his first Memphis concert since 1961. His March 20 performance was recorded for a concert album, Elvis Recorded Live on Stage in Memphis. He returned the following year at the close of his second tour, on June 10, 1975, and performed for the last time on July 5, 1976.

Michael Jackson along with The Jacksons kicked off their Triumph Tour by performing at the arena on July 8, 1981.

English heavy metal band Judas Priest filmed a December 12, 1982, concert at the Coliseum, later released on video as Judas Priest Live and on DVD as Live Vengeance '82.

Canadian singer Celine Dion performed a two-night stand at the arena on March 14 and 15, 1997 as part of her Falling Into You Around the World Tour, which was also filmed for the concert video Live in Memphis.

=== Professional wrestling ===
The Mid-South Coliseum was also well known in professional wrestling as the home base for the United States Wrestling Association and its predecessors; Jerry Lawler headlined hundreds of shows at the facility. It held weekly wrestling shows that regularly drew over 10,000 people from 1970 to 1991. Among many notable events, Lawler faced Terry Funk in an "empty arena fight" at the Coliseum in 1981. On April 5, 1982, Lawler piledrove comedian Andy Kaufman twice, ending a match between the two in disqualification. Kaufman was taken away in an ambulance. The incident would become the impetus for a feud that culminated in Kaufman and Lawler appearing together on Late Night with David Letterman a few months later in an altercation since revealed to be staged in which Lawler slapped Kaufman on-air and Kaufman responded by shouting profanities and throwing coffee at Lawler before storming out of the studio. The act is largely credited with giving rise to modern-day professional wrestling. On April 27, 1987, Austin Idol defeated Lawler in a steel cage match, causing the audience to riot. World Championship Wrestling also held several events at the Coliseum over the course of 1996 through 2000.

=== Hockey ===
The Mid-South Coliseum served as the home of the original Central Hockey League team, the Memphis Wings (later the Memphis South Stars) from 1964 through 1969. To accommodate hockey, piping was installed beneath the Coliseum's floor surface. The ice was often left intact between games, allowing Memphis residents to partake in public skating.

In 1992, the Memphis RiverKings of the newly re-formed Central Hockey League brought a successful return of professional hockey to the Mid-South Coliseum, drawing good crowds from 1992 to 2000. Trying political circumstances prevented much-needed updates from being made to the Coliseum, resulting in the RiverKings moving to the new DeSoto Civic Center, now Landers Center, in Southaven, Mississippi in 2000.

=== Indoor soccer ===
The Memphis Rogues played the 1979–80 season of NASL indoor soccer at the Coliseum. The Rogues won the Western Division and went all the way to the finals, winning Game 1 of the series, 5–4 at home in front of 9,081 fans before losing Game 2 and the mini-game tie breaker to the Tampa Bay Rowdies at the Bayfront Center.

== Basketball ==
The Coliseum was home to the American Basketball Association's Memphis Pros. After the New Orleans Buccaneers moved upriver to Memphis in 1971, the Memphis Pros struggled in their first season. The team was then purchased by baseball Oakland A's owner Charlie Finley, who renamed them the Tams and briefly hired Kentucky coach Adolph Rupp as team President. After Finley sold the team, the renamed Sounds also struggled in 1974–75. The franchise left Memphis for Baltimore in 1975, becoming the Baltimore Claws and folded before playing a regular season game.

As an ABA arena the Coliseum hosted the Indiana Pacers during the 1971 Western Division Semifinals and the Kentucky Colonels during the 1975 Eastern Division Finals; the Pacers went on to win the 1971 ABA Championship and the Colonels went on to win the 1975 ABA Championship.

It was home to the Memphis Tigers basketball team before the Pyramid opened in 1991. The Coliseum also hosted five Metro Conference men's basketball tournaments.

== Closure and redevelopment ==
The venue closed at the end of 2006, when Memphis and Shelby County Governments refused the request from the Mid-South Coliseum Board to pay its operating losses, which were projected to be $1 million a year. The Coliseum also needed renovations to comply with the Americans with Disabilities Act.

In 2016, an assessment found that a renovation and restoration of the Coliseum (including ADA compliance) would cost around $23.8 million. In 2018, a group known as the Coliseum Coalition was formed to pursue the preservation of the facility as part of redevelopment of the Memphis Fairgrounds into a youth sports complex. In 2018, a plan was proposed to use funding from the designation of the Fairgrounds as a tourism development zone (TDZ) to "achieve the reactivation, adaptive reuse, or redevelopment of the Mid-South Coliseum". The Coliseum was not included in the plan approved the state, but it was suggested that the development could help spur private investment. Coalition member Marvin Stockwell stated that the building was still "in great shape".

In 2022, professional soccer team Memphis 901 FC announced plans to build a soccer-specific stadium at the site of the Mid-South Coliseum, which would be demolished. The new stadium was planned to open in 2025 and include 6,500 to 8,000 seats on a 6-acre (2.4 ha) site. However, Memphis 901 folded in November 2024 after being unable to secure funding.
