= List of number-one albums of 1996 (Canada) =

These are the Canadian number-one albums of 1996. The chart was compiled and published by RPM every Monday.

== Number-one albums ==
†	This indicates the best performing album of the year.

Issue date	Album	Artist
January 1	Anthology 1	The Beatles
January 8	Anthology 1	The Beatles
January 15	Anthology 1	The Beatles
January 22	Jagged Little Pill †	Alanis Morissette
January 29	Jagged Little Pill †	Alanis Morissette
February 5	(What's the Story) Morning Glory?	Oasis
February 12	Jagged Little Pill †	Alanis Morissette
February 19	(What's the Story) Morning Glory?	Oasis
February 26	Jagged Little Pill †	Alanis Morissette
March 4	Jagged Little Pill †	Alanis Morissette
March 11	Jagged Little Pill †	Alanis Morissette
March 18	Jagged Little Pill †	Alanis Morissette
March 25	Jagged Little Pill †	Alanis Morissette
April 1	Falling into You	Celine Dion
April 8	Falling into You	Celine Dion
April 15	Jagged Little Pill †	Alanis Morissette
April 22	Jagged Little Pill †	Alanis Morissette
April 29	Falling into You	Celine Dion
May 6	Falling into You	Celine Dion
May 13	Jagged Little Pill †	Alanis Morissette
May 20	Trouble at the Henhouse	The Tragically Hip
May 27	Trouble at the Henhouse	The Tragically Hip
June 3	Trouble at the Henhouse	The Tragically Hip
June 10	Trouble at the Henhouse	The Tragically Hip
June 17	Load	Metallica
June 24	The Score	Fugees
July 1	The Score	Fugees
July 8	The Score	Fugees
July 15	The Score	Fugees
July 22	New Beginning	Tracy Chapman
July 29	New Beginning	Tracy Chapman
August 5	Much Dance Mix '96	Various artists
August 12	Much Dance Mix '96	Various artists
August 19	Much Dance Mix '96	Various artists
August 26	Jagged Little Pill †	Alanis Morissette
September 2	Jagged Little Pill †	Alanis Morissette
September 9	No Code	Pearl Jam
September 16	Much Dance Mix '96	Various artists
September 23	Home Again	New Edition
September 30	Home Again	New Edition
October 7	New Adventures in Hi-Fi	R.E.M.
October 14	From the Muddy Banks of the Wishkah	Nirvana
October 21	From the Muddy Banks of the Wishkah	Nirvana
October 28	From the Muddy Banks of the Wishkah	Nirvana
November 4	From the Muddy Banks of the Wishkah	Nirvana
November 11	Best Of – Volume I	Van Halen
November 18	Best Of – Volume I	Van Halen
November 25	Falling into You	Celine Dion
December 2	Razorblade Suitcase	Bush
December 9	Razorblade Suitcase	Bush
December 16	Razorblade Suitcase	Bush
December 23	Razorblade Suitcase	Bush
December 30	Razorblade Suitcase	Bush

== See also ==
- List of Canadian number-one singles of 1996
