= List of Cash Box Top 100 number-one singles of 1996 =

These are the singles that reached number one on the Top 100 Singles chart in 1996 as published by Cash Box magazine. Cash Box magazine ceased publication with the November 16, 1996, issue.

Issue date	Song	Artist
January 6	"One Sweet Day"	Mariah Carey & Boyz II Men
January 13	"One Sweet Day"	Mariah Carey & Boyz II Men
January 20	"One Sweet Day"	Mariah Carey & Boyz II Men
January 27	"One Sweet Day"	Mariah Carey & Boyz II Men
February 3	"One Sweet Day"	Mariah Carey & Boyz II Men
February 10	"One Sweet Day"	Mariah Carey & Boyz II Men
February 17	"One Sweet Day"	Mariah Carey & Boyz II Men
February 24	"Missing"	Everything but the Girl
March 2	"Not Gon' Cry"	Mary J. Blige
March 9	"Not Gon' Cry"	Mary J. Blige
March 16	"Sittin' Up in My Room"	Brandy
March 23	"Sittin' Up in My Room"	Brandy
March 30	"Always Be My Baby"	Mariah Carey
April 6	"Always Be My Baby"	Mariah Carey
April 13	"Always Be My Baby"	Mariah Carey
April 20	"Because You Loved Me"	Celine Dion
April 27	"Because You Loved Me"	Celine Dion
May 4	"Because You Loved Me"	Celine Dion
May 11	"Always Be My Baby"	Mariah Carey
May 18	"Always Be My Baby"	Mariah Carey
May 25	"Tha Crossroads"	Bone Thugs-n-Harmony
June 1	"Tha Crossroads"	Bone Thugs-n-Harmony
June 8	"Tha Crossroads"	Bone Thugs-n-Harmony
June 15	"Tha Crossroads"	Bone Thugs-n-Harmony
June 22	"Tha Crossroads"	Bone Thugs-n-Harmony
June 29	"Tha Crossroads"	Bone Thugs-n-Harmony
July 6	"Tha Crossroads"	Bone Thugs-n-Harmony
July 13	"You're Makin' Me High/Let It Flow"	Toni Braxton
July 20	"You're Makin' Me High/Let It Flow"	Toni Braxton
July 27	"You're Makin' Me High/Let It Flow"	Toni Braxton
August 3	"You're Makin' Me High/Let It Flow"	Toni Braxton
August 10	"You're Makin' Me High/Let It Flow"	Toni Braxton
August 17	"You're Makin' Me High/Let It Flow"	Toni Braxton
August 24	"Macarena (Bayside Boys Mix)"	Los del Río
August 31	"Macarena (Bayside Boys Mix)"	Los del Río
September 7	"Macarena (Bayside Boys Mix)"	Los del Río
September 14	"I Love You Always Forever"	Donna Lewis
September 21	"I Love You Always Forever"	Donna Lewis
September 28	"I Love You Always Forever"	Donna Lewis
October 5	"I Love You Always Forever"	Donna Lewis
October 12	"I Love You Always Forever"	Donna Lewis
October 19	"I Love You Always Forever"	Donna Lewis
October 26	"I Love You Always Forever"	Donna Lewis
November 2	"It's All Coming Back To Me Now"	Celine Dion
November 9	"It's All Coming Back To Me Now"	Celine Dion
November 16	"No Diggity"	Blackstreet featuring Dr. Dre

== See also ==
- 1996 in music
- List of Hot 100 number-one singles of 1996 (U.S.)
