= The Power of the Dream =

Single by Celine Dion
- B-side: "It's All Coming Back to Me Now" (radio edit)
- Released: 20 August 1996
- Venue: Centennial Olympic Stadium (Atlanta)
- Genre: Pop; classical
- Length: 4:31
- Label: SMEJ
- Songwriters: David Foster; Babyface; Linda Thompson
- Producers: David Foster; Babyface

Celine Dion singles chronology
"It's All Coming Back to Me Now" (1996)	"The Power of the Dream" (1996)	"All by Myself" (1996)

Audio
- "The Power of the Dream" on YouTube

"The Power of the Dream" is a song by Canadian singer Celine Dion, released as a single in Japan on 20 August 1996 by Sony Music Entertainment Japan. Written and produced by David Foster, Linda Thompson, and Babyface, it was created for the opening ceremony of the 1996 Summer Olympics. Dion performed the song before more than 100,000 attendees and over three and a half billion television viewers, donating her earnings to support Canadian athletes. USA Today later ranked it as the second best Olympics theme song of all time.

== Background and release ==
"The Power of the Dream" was issued as a commercial single in Japan on 20 August 1996. It was later included on limited editions of Falling into You in Asia and Australia, and served as a B-side to "Because You Loved Me", "It's All Coming Back to Me Now", and "All by Myself". In 2000, the song became available internationally on The Collector's Series, Volume One, and in 2008 it appeared on the US edition of My Love: Essential Collection.

== Commercial performance ==
The single peaked at number 30 on the Oricon Singles Chart in Japan and was certified gold. Although it was not released in other markets, various radio stations worldwide played "The Power of the Dream", and it appeared on several airplay charts.

== Music video ==
The music video includes Dion performing the song during the opening ceremony of the 1996 Summer Olympics, accompanied by David Foster on piano, the Atlanta Symphony Orchestra, and the Centennial Choir, which included the Morehouse College Glee Club, the Spelman College Glee Club, and the Atlanta Symphony Orchestra Chorus.

== Live performances ==
Dion performed "The Power of the Dream" during her 1996–97 Falling into You: Around the World tour.

== Formats and track listing ==
- Japanese 3-inch CD single
1. "The Power of the Dream" – 4:31
2. "It's All Coming Back to Me Now" (radio edit) – 5:27

== Personnel and credits ==
Credits adapted from Discogs.

- Celine Dion – lead vocals
- David Foster – writer, producer, keyboards, bass (synth)
- Babyface – writer, producer, drum programming (kick programming)
- Linda Thompson – writer
- Simon Franglen – drum programming (snare sound), synclavier
- Dan Shea – programming (synthesizer)
- William Ross – arranger (orchestra), conductor
- Mervyn Warren – conductor (choir)
- London Symphony Orchestra – orchestra
- Dean Parks – acoustic guitar
- Michael Thompson – electric guitar
- David Reitzas – engineer
- Felipe Elgueta – engineer
- Humberto Gatica – recording engineer
- Jon Gass – recording engineer
- Marnie Riley – recording engineer
- Mick Guzauski – mixing engineer
- Kyle Bess – assistant engineer
- Paul Boutin – assistant engineer

== Charts ==
1996 chart performance
Chart (1996)	Peak position
Belgium (Ultratop Airplay Flanders)	154
Belgium (Ultratop Airplay Wallonia)	141
Japan (Oricon Singles Chart)	30
Quebec Radio Songs (ADISQ)	49
Taiwan (IFPI)	2

2025 chart performance
Chart (2025)	Peak position
Quebec Digital Song Sales (ADISQ)	3

== Certifications and sales ==
Certifications
Region	Certification	Certified units/sales
Japan (RIAJ)	Gold	73,440

== Release history ==
Release history
Region	Date	Format	Label	Ref.
Japan	21 August 1996	3-inch CD	SMEJ	
