= Soul Attorneys =

Canadian music group

- Also known as: J. Gaines and the Soul Attorneys
- Origin: Quebec City, Quebec, Canada
- Genres: pop; R&B
- Years active: 1994–present
- Label: Sony
- Members: Jacques Gaines; Mathieu Dandurand
- Past members: Eric Filto

J. Gaines and the Soul Attorneys is a Canadian pop R&B band based in Quebec City.

== History ==
The band formed in 1994 in Quebec City as the Soul Attorneys, which at the time consisted of Jacques Gaines, Eric Filto, and Mathieu Dandurand.

They performed and recorded under their original moniker between 1995 and 1999. They toured with Celine Dion in 1996, signing with Sony Records, and released three Canadian top-10 singles, "These Are the Days", "See the People", and "So They Say".

In 2000, after Eric Filto left the band, Jacques Gaines added his own name to the band's title, and released the album Another Day, produced by Aldo Nova.

In 2001, their song "Better Man" was named by SOCAN as one of the most performed Canadian pop songs.

Jacques Gaines released a French-language, self-titled solo album in 2004, and a solo English-language album, Four, in 2007. The first single is "These Things". He currently lives in Quebec City, in charge of advertising at the Quebec circus school (l'École de Cirque de Québec).
