= All by Myself =

1975 song by Eric Carmen

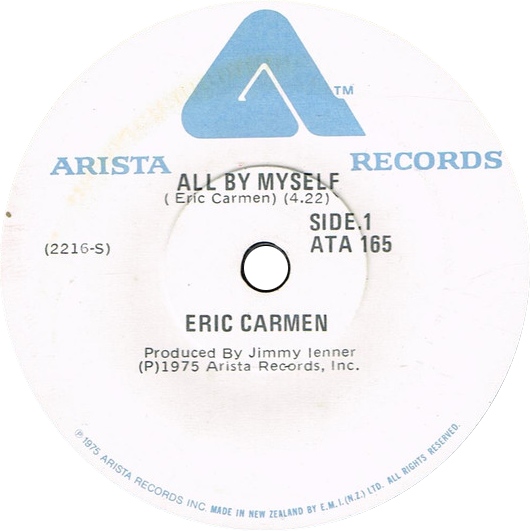
- Side A of the New Zealand single

Single by Eric Carmen

from the album Eric Carmen
- B-side: "Everything"
- Released: December 1975
- Recorded: 1975
- Genre: Soft rock
- Length: 7:10 (album version); 4:22 (single edit)
- Label: Arista
- Composers: Eric Carmen; Sergei Rachmaninoff
- Lyricist: Eric Carmen
- Producer: Jimmy Ienner

Eric Carmen singles chronology
"All by Myself" (1975)	"Never Gonna Fall in Love Again" (1976)

Audio
- "All by Myself" on YouTube

"All by Myself" is a song by American singer-songwriter Eric Carmen, released by Arista Records in December 1975 as the first single from Carmen's eponymous debut album. The verse is based on the second movement (Adagio sostenuto) of Russian composer Sergei Rachmaninoff's 1900–01 Piano Concerto No. 2 in C minor, Opus 18. The chorus draws from the song "Let's Pretend", which Carmen had written and recorded with the Raspberries in 1972. The slide guitar solo was performed by studio guitarist Hugh McCracken. The song reached number two on the Billboard Hot 100, becoming Carmen's biggest hit on the pop chart.

== Background and composition ==
According to Eric Carmen, he first wrote the solo section of the song, working in four-bar segments and completing the interlude after two months. He then needed to place it within a full composition. After listening to Sergei Rachmaninoff's second piano concerto, a piece widely associated with the 1945 British film Brief Encounter, he adapted the melody of its second movement to create the verse. Rachmaninoff's work was in the public domain in the United States at that time, so Carmen believed no copyright applied. However, it remained protected in other countries when the album was released. He was later contacted by the Rachmaninoff estate and informed that the material was still under copyright outside the US. An agreement was reached in which the estate received 12 percent of the royalties from "All by Myself" and from "Never Gonna Fall in Love Again", which drew on the third movement of Rachmaninoff's Symphony No. 2.

Carmen also stated that he incorporated part of another melody into the song. The chorus draws from his 1973 hit with the Raspberries, "Let's Pretend".

== Release ==
The power ballad was the first single from Carmen's first solo LP after he left the power pop group the Raspberries, and it was released in December 1975. Billboard described the track as "a superb rock ballad...faithfully capturing most of the good time feel in rock". Cash Box wrote that Carmen "captures the vocal power of at least two of the three Bee Gees and seems also to have tapped the lyric capabilities of a Paul McCartney". Record World commented that Carmen "croons over a backdrop of cascading strings on this self-penned delight from his recent album".

The single reached number two on the Billboard Hot 100. "Love Machine" by The Miracles and "December 1963 (Oh, What a Night)" by the Four Seasons kept it from the top position. "All by Myself" reached number one on the Cash Box Top 100 Singles and number three in Canada. It sold more than one million copies in the United States and was certified gold by the RIAA in April 1976. It was Carmen's first of eight US Top 40 hits. In the UK, it was his only Top 40 entry, peaking at number 12 on the UK Singles Chart. The song appeared in "The One Where Eddie Moves In", a 1996 episode of Friends from season two, during a scene in which Chandler Bing (Matthew Perry) and Joey Tribbiani (Matt LeBlanc) are depressed after Joey moves out.

== Television performance ==
Carmen performed "All by Myself" and his follow-up hit "Never Gonna Fall in Love Again" on The Midnight Special on July 23, 1976 (season four, episode 37). The episode was hosted by The Spinners.

== Charts ==
=== Weekly charts ===
Weekly chart performance
Chart (1975–1976)	Peak position
Australia (Kent Music Report)	7
Belgium (Ultratop 50 Flanders)	15
Canada Top Singles (RPM)	3
Canada Adult Contemporary (RPM)	1
Ireland (IRMA)	16
Italy (Musica e Dischi)	7
Netherlands (Dutch Top 40)	10
Netherlands (Single Top 100)	7
New Zealand (Recorded Music NZ)	6
South Africa (Springbok)	9
UK Singles (Official Charts)	12
US Billboard Hot 100	2
US Adult Contemporary (Billboard)	6
US Cash Box Top 100	1
US Record World Singles	1

=== Year-end charts ===
Year-end chart performance
Chart (1976)	Position
Australia (Kent Music Report)	67
Canada Top Singles (RPM)	48
US Billboard Hot 100	40
US Cash Box Top 100	41

== Celine Dion version ==
"All by Myself"

Single by Celine Dion

from the album Falling into You
- B-side: "The Power of the Dream"
- Released: December 9, 1996
- Studio: Record Plant; Compass Point; Capitol
- Genre: Soft rock
- Length: 5:12
- Label: Columbia; Epic
- Songwriters: Eric Carmen; Sergei Rachmaninoff
- Producer: David Foster

Celine Dion singles chronology
"The Power of the Dream" (1996)	"All by Myself" (1996)	"Call the Man" (1997)

Music video
- "All by Myself" on YouTube

Audio sample
- file; help

The most notable cover of "All by Myself" was recorded by Canadian singer Celine Dion in 1996. It was issued as the fourth (or third, depending on the country) single from her fourth English-language studio album, Falling into You (1996). Produced by David Foster at Compass Point Studios in the Bahamas, it was released on December 9, 1996, in the United Kingdom and on March 11, 1997, in the United States. Selected editions of the album and the single include a Spanish-language version titled "Sola Otra Vez".

During an appearance on Watch What Happens Live with Andy Cohen, Dion revealed that the well-known high note (F5) leading into the key change had not been planned. Foster introduced it during the recording session, and when Dion asked why, he replied that if she could not sing it, other vocalists would. She then insisted on proving she could deliver the note.

=== Critical reception ===
Dion's version received positive reviews from most music critics. Bill Lamb from About.com placed it at number nine on his list of "Top 10 Celine Dion Songs". Entertainment Weekly editor Chuck Eddy wrote that "only in her desolate cover of Eric Carmen's 'All by Myself' does she truly crash through the glass ceiling of passion". Pip Ellwood-Hughes of Entertainment Focus described it as "incredible" and "one of the best recorded vocals ever captured", adding that Dion's high notes are "magical" and "send goosebumps down your spine". Dave Sholin from the Gavin Report wrote that demand from programmers and listeners made the song an obvious choice for release as the third single from Dion's multi-platinum, Grammy-nominated album. Kevin Courtney of the Irish Times commented that "it's probably a good thing that Celine is all by herself; people in the room with her might have their eardrums shattered by her climactic, over the top delivery".

A reviewer for Music Week awarded the single five out of five, writing that "Dion does a great job with the Eric Carmen power ballad, and this one could be in for a long run given its guaranteed appeal to once-a-year record buyers. A contender for the top spot". The magazine's Alan Jones added that "it's handled with consummate ease by Dion". Yahoo editor Dan Leroy wrote that "trying to out-emote Eric Carmen was almost crazy enough to work". The New York Times critic Stephen Holden wrote that the cover, along with "Because You Loved Me", "are the strongest cuts on an album crammed with formulaic romantic bombast". A reviewer for People wrote that Dion "knocks herself out trying to match the classic bombast that Eric Carmen dished out on 'All By Myself'". Geoff Edgers of Salon described it as a "dog-ear-shattering remake". Christopher Smith of TalkAboutPopMusic wrote:

Only a few vocalists could possibly attempt to do justice to Eric Carmen's 1975 classic, but with her out-of-this-world voice, Celine is one of them and perhaps the only one big enough to lift the song's long and emotional chords at the end. Celine shatters glass and blows ear drums as she reaches that final "anymore". Bring on the orchestra, drums and guitar as they prove no match for Celine as she repeats the song's central line again and again "don't wanna be, all by myself". Earth shattering and epic are the words and it was hardly surprising that it wouldn't be released as a single in due course either.

=== Commercial performance ===
The single became one of Dion's biggest US hits, reaching number one on the Hot Adult Contemporary Tracks for three weeks and on the Latin Pop Airplay chart for two weeks. It peaked at number four on the Billboard Hot 100 (number seven on the Billboard Hot 100 Airplay and number five on the Hot 100 Singles Sales). It also reached the top 10 in the United Kingdom, Ireland, France, and Belgium's Wallonia. In Canada, "All by Myself" was issued as a promotional single only, topping the Adult Contemporary chart. It was certified platinum in Canada, gold in the United States, United Kingdom, and New Zealand, and silver in France.

=== Music video ===
A music video was produced to promote the single, directed by British filmmaker Nigel Dick. It includes footage from Dion's photo session for the Falling into You album cover and scenes from her Live à Paris concert. These are intercut with sepia-toned shots of Dion appearing lonely and contemplative. The video was uploaded to Dion's official YouTube channel in 2012 and had accumulated more than 85 million views as of April 2026. A video for the Spanish version was added in 2021.

=== Formats and track listing ===
==== Singles ====
- European 7-inch and CD single
1. "All by Myself" – 5:12
2. "The Power of the Dream" – 4:31
- Japanese 3-inch CD single
1. "All by Myself" (single version) – 4:24
2. "Pour que tu m'aimes encore" (live) – 4:51
- US 7-inch, cassette and CD single
1. "All by Myself" (edited single version) – 3:57
2. "Because You Loved Me" (live) – 4:50

==== Maxi-singles ====
- Australian cassette and CD single
1. "All by Myself" (edited single version) – 3:58
2. "Because You Loved Me" (live) – 4:52
3. "Next Plane Out" (radio edit) – 4:37
4. "Vole" (live) – 4:03
5. "All by Myself" (album version) – 5:12
- European 12-inch single
1. "All by Myself" – 5:12
2. "The Power of the Dream" – 4:31
3. "It's All Coming Back to Me Now" (classic paradise radio mix #1) – 4:22
- European CD single
1. "All by Myself" (single version) – 4:26
2. "All by Myself" – 5:12
3. "Je sais pas" (live) – 4:26
4. "Pour que tu m'aimes encore" (live) – 4:52
- UK cassette single
1. "All by Myself" (edited single version) – 3:58
2. "All by Myself" (Spanish version) – 5:12
3. "When I Fall in Love" (duet with Clive Griffin) – 4:20
- UK CD single #1
1. "All by Myself" (album version) – 5:12
2. "Pour que tu m'aimes encore" (live) – 4:38
3. "Je sais pas" (live) – 4:26
4. "River Deep, Mountain High" (live) – 3:28
- UK CD single #2
1. "All by Myself" (edited single version) – 3:58
2. "When I Fall in Love" – 4:20
3. "Declaration of Love" – 4:20
4. "A Message from Celine" – 0:34

=== Charts ===
==== Weekly charts ====
Weekly chart performance
Chart (1996–1997)	Peak position
Australia (ARIA)	38
Austria (Ö3 Austria Top 40)	27
Belgium (Ultratop 50 Flanders)	14
Belgium (Ultratop 50 Wallonia)	7
Canada (Nielsen BDS Airplay Chart)	9
Canada Top Singles (RPM)	7
Canada Adult Contemporary (RPM)	1
Europe (Eurochart Hot 100)	15
Europe (European Hit Radio)	28
Finland (Suomen virallinen radiosoittolista)	10
France (SNEP)	5
Germany (GfK)	55
Hungary (Rádiós Top 40)	5
Iceland (Íslenski Listinn Topp 40)	5
Ireland (IRMA)	8
Israel (Israeli Singles Chart)	11
Netherlands (Dutch Top 40)	35
Netherlands (Single Top 100)	20
New Zealand (Recorded Music NZ)	21
Norway (VG-lista)	15
Quebec Radio Songs (ADISQ)	1
Scottish Singles Sales (Official Charts)	6
Spain (Top 40 Radio)	31
Switzerland (Schweizer Hitparade)	36
UK Singles (Official Charts)	6
UK Airplay (Music Week)	13
US Billboard Hot 100	4
US Adult Contemporary (Billboard)	1
US Adult Pop Airplay (Billboard)	12
US Hot Latin Songs (Billboard) "Sola Otra Vez"	5
US Pop Airplay (Billboard)	7
US Rhythmic Airplay (Billboard)	33

==== Year-end charts ====
1996 year-end chart performance
Chart (1996)	Position
Belgium (Ultratop 50 Wallonia)	93
France (SNEP)	49

1997 year-end chart performance
Chart (1997)	Position
Brazil Airplay (Crowley)	46
Canada Top Singles (RPM)	58
Canada Adult Contemporary (RPM)	6
Iceland (Íslenski Listinn Topp 40)	69
Romania (Romanian Top 100)	52
US Billboard Hot 100	49
US Adult Contemporary (Billboard)	13
US Hot Latin Tracks (Billboard) "Sola Otra Vez"	38
US Top 40/Mainstream (Billboard)	52

=== Certifications ===
Certifications
Region	Certification	Certified units/sales
Canada (Music Canada)	Platinum	80,000^{‡}
France (SNEP)	Silver	125,000^{*}
New Zealand (RMNZ)	Gold	15,000^{‡}
United Kingdom (BPI)	Gold	400,000^{‡}
United States (RIAA)	Gold	500,000^{^}
^{*} Sales figures based on certification alone.^{^} Shipments figures based on certification alone.^{‡} Sales+streaming figures based on certification alone.

=== Release history ===
Region	Date	Format	Label	Ref.
United Kingdom	December 9, 1996	Cassette; CD	Epic	
Japan	January 22, 1997	3-inch CD	SMEJ	
United States	January 28, 1997	Contemporary hit radio	Epic	

== See also ==
- Billboard Year-End Hot 100 singles of 1976
- Billboard Year-End Hot 100 singles of 1997
- List of Billboard Adult Contemporary number ones of 1997
- List of Billboard Hot 100 top-ten singles in 1997
- List of Billboard Latin Pop Airplay number ones of 1997
- List of Cash Box Top 100 number-one singles of 1976
- List of UK top-ten singles in 1996
