= Because You Loved Me =

1996 single by Celine Dion

Single by Celine Dion

from the album Falling into You
- Released: 19 February 1996
- Studio: Chartmarker (Los Angeles); Capitol (Hollywood); Rumbo (Los Angeles)
- Genre: Pop
- Length: 4:33
- Label: Columbia; Epic
- Songwriter: Diane Warren
- Producer: David Foster

Celine Dion singles chronology
"Falling into You" (1996)	"Because You Loved Me" (1996)	"It's All Coming Back to Me Now" (1996)

Audio
- "Because You Loved Me" on YouTube

"Because You Loved Me" is a song recorded by Canadian singer Celine Dion for her fourth English-language studio album, Falling into You (1996). Written by Diane Warren and produced by David Foster, it served as the theme song for the 1996 film Up Close & Personal, starring Robert Redford and Michelle Pfeiffer. The song was released on 19 February 1996 as the album's lead single in North America and on 20 May 1996 as its second single in the United Kingdom. Billboard ranked it number 14 on its list of the "Top 50 Love Songs of All Time".

"Because You Loved Me" received positive reviews from music critics and achieved commercial success worldwide. It reached number one in the United States, Canada, and Australia, and peaked within the top ten in numerous other countries. In the United States, the song has sold more than two million copies. It won the Grammy Award for Best Song Written for Visual Media and received nominations for Record of the Year, Song of the Year, and Best Female Pop Vocal Performance. It was also nominated for the Academy Award for Best Original Song and the Golden Globe Award for Best Original Song. Worldwide, the single sold more than five million copies within its first six months of release.

== Composition and release ==
"Because You Loved Me" was written by Diane Warren and produced by David Foster. Both had worked with Dion on her earlier English‑language albums. Warren described the song as a tribute to her father. The track is a downtempo pop ballad in which the narrator expresses gratitude to a supportive loved one for guidance, encouragement, and protection throughout her life. It served as the theme song for the 1996 film Up Close & Personal, starring Robert Redford and Michelle Pfeiffer, although it was not included on the film's official soundtrack.

"Because You Loved Me" was issued as the lead single from Falling into You in North America on 19 February 1996, and as the second single in the United Kingdom on 20 May 1996, following "Falling into You". The song is written in D♭ major with a tempo of 60 beats per minute. Dion's vocal range spans from A♭_{3} to A♭_{5}, and the final chorus modulates to E♭ major.

== Critical reception ==
"Because You Loved Me" received positive reviews from most music critics. The Advocate described it as a "big ballad" and an "emotional roller coaster". Senior editor of AllMusic, Stephen Thomas Erlewine praised ballads like "Because You Loved Me" on the Falling into You album. Larry Flick from Billboard magazine wrote that it is "rife with grand romance, larger-than-life production, and a climax that is best described as the musical equivalent to 4th of July fireworks". Another Billboard editor, Paul Verna, also praised the song.

Daina Darzin from Cash Box described it as "a classic Adult Contemporary ballad, [with] sparkling, lush instrumentals showcasing Dion's effortless, accomplished voice", adding that it was positioned to follow the success of material from Waiting To Exhale and other romantic blockbusters. Dave Sholin from the Gavin Report wrote that it would be "one of the first major hits of 1996", noting that Dion's media presence in the spring would help the project reach a wide audience. The Hartford Courant described it as a "luxurious love song".

A reviewer from Music Week awarded it a full score of five out of five, writing that it "tugs the heartstrings like a surefire winner". Stephen Holden of The New York Times called it this year's "Wind Beneath My Wings". The Richmond Times-Dispatch selected "Because You Loved Me" as one of the best songs on Falling into You. Christopher Smith from TalkAboutPopMusic described it as a "beautiful, soulful ballad" and noted that Dion "turns on the power over the final choruses".

== Commercial performance ==
In the United States, "Because You Loved Me" became Dion's second number one single, after "The Power of Love" in 1994. It topped the Billboard Hot 100 for six consecutive weeks and ended the run of "One Sweet Day" by Mariah Carey and Boyz II Men. The song also spent 19 weeks at number one on the Adult Contemporary Singles chart, setting a record for the most weeks at the top. In the following years, only five songs surpassed this total, including Dion's "A New Day Has Come" in 2002 (21 weeks). It also reached number one on other US charts, including Hot 100 Airplay for 14 weeks, Adult Top 40 for 12 weeks, Hot Singles Sales for six weeks, and Top 40/Mainstream for five weeks.

In April 1996, "Because You Loved Me" was certified platinum by the RIAA for one million copies sold. As of April 2012, it had sold 1,343,000 physical copies and 704,000 digital units, for a total of 2,047,000 copies, and as of November 2019 the song had more than 154.7 million on‑demand streams in the United States, making it Dion's second most streamed track in the country. In March 2021, it was certified double platinum in the US. According to Billboard, it remains Dion's biggest Billboard Hot 100 hit, followed by "It's All Coming Back to Me Now".

In Canada, "Because You Loved Me" topped The Record Singles Chart for one week in May 1996 and spent 10 weeks at number one on the RPM Adult Contemporary Chart. It finished as the number‑one song on the RPM Adult Contemporary Year‑end Chart for 1996 and was certified triple platinum by the CRIA.

The single also topped the chart in Australia for three weeks and was certified double platinum there. It reached number two in Ireland, number three in New Zealand and Switzerland, number four in the Netherlands, number five in Belgium (Flanders), and number eight in Denmark. It was certified platinum in New Zealand and Denmark, and gold in Germany and Spain.

In the United Kingdom, the song peaked at number five. As of March 2021, it had accumulated 27 million streams, 366,000 physical CD sales, and 163,000 downloads. In February 2026, it was certified double platinum by the BPI.

== Music video ==
A music video was created for the song and shows Dion performing in a newsroom surrounded by multiple TV monitors, where most of the video takes place, intercut with scenes from the film Up Close & Personal. It was directed by Kevin Bray in January 1996 and released in March 1996.

At the height of the song's popularity, it was played during the Nebraska Cornhuskers football team's spring game on 20 April 1996 as part of a tribute video to quarterback Brook Berringer, who had died two days earlier in a plane crash.

== Live performances ==
During the promotion of Falling into You, Dion performed "Because You Loved Me" on various television shows in the United States, Italy, Germany, and the Netherlands. She also sang it at the Blockbuster Entertainment Awards and World Music Awards in 1996, and at the 69th Academy Awards in March 1997. "Because You Loved Me" became part of the Falling into You: Around the World, Let's Talk About Love World Tour, and Taking Chances World Tour. It was also included in Dion's two Las Vegas residencies, A New Day... and Celine.

Live performances of "Because You Loved Me" appear on ...Live in Memphis 1997 (1998), All the Way... A Decade of Song & Video (2001), A New Day... Live in Las Vegas (2004), Live in Las Vegas: A New Day... (2007), and Taking Chances World Tour: The Concert (2010). Dion also performed the song during her Summer Tour 2016, her 2017 European tour, and 2018 tour. On 5 July 2019, Dion performed "Because You Loved Me" at her BST Hyde Park concert in London, and she continued to include the song on her Courage World Tour.

== Accolades ==
At the 39th Annual Grammy Awards, "Because You Loved Me" was nominated for Record of the Year, Best Female Pop Vocal Performance, and Song of the Year, and won the Grammy Award for Best Song Written Specifically for a Motion Picture or Television. At the Juno Awards of 1997, the song was nominated for the Juno Award for Single of the Year. It also received four nominations at the 1996 Billboard Music Awards in the categories Hot 100 Singles, Hot 100 Singles Airplay, Hot Adult Contemporary Singles & Tracks, and Hot Adult Top 40 Singles & Tracks.

Additionally, "Because You Loved Me" was nominated for the Academy Award for Best Original Song, the Golden Globe Award for Best Original Song, and the Blockbuster Entertainment Award for Favourite Song from a Movie. It won the ASCAP Film and Television Music Award for Most Performed Song from Motion Picture, and the ASCAP Pop Awards for Most Performed Song in 1997, 1998, and 1999. In 2017, About.com placed the song at number 10 on its list of "Top 10 Celine Dion Songs".

== Formats and track listing ==
- Australian cassette and CD single
1. "Because You Loved Me" – 4:33
2. "I Don't Know" – 4:38
3. "Pour que tu m'aimes encore" – 4:14
4. "Le ballet" – 4:25
5. "The Power of the Dream" – 4:30 (second pressing only)
- European 7-inch and CD single
1. "Because You Loved Me" – 4:33
2. "If You Asked Me To" – 3:55
- European 12-inch and CD maxi-single; UK CD maxi-single
1. "Because You Loved Me" – 4:32
2. "Nothing Broken but My Heart" (radio edit) – 4:11
3. "Next Plane Out" – 4:54
4. "If You Asked Me To" – 3:52
- European CD maxi-single #2
1. "Because You Loved Me" – 4:33
2. "The Power of the Dream" – 4:30
3. "Think Twice" – 4:47
4. "Le fils de Superman" – 4:32
- Japanese 3-inch CD single; US 7-inch, cassette, and CD single
1. "Because You Loved Me" – 4:33
2. "I Don't Know" – 4:38
- UK 7-inch and cassette single
1. "Because You Loved Me" – 4:33
2. "To Love You More" – 5:29
- UK CD maxi-single #2
1. "Because You Loved Me" – 4:32
2. "To Love You More" – 5:29
3. "All by Myself" (Spanish version) – 5:12
4. "Think Twice" – 4:43

== Credits and personnel ==
Recording

- Recorded at Chartmaker Studios, Capitol Studios, and Rumbo Recorders
- Mixed at The Record Plant

Personnel

- Celine Dion – lead vocal
- Diane Warren – songwriter
- David Foster – producer
- Jon Avnet – executive producer for Up Close & Personal
- Sue Ann Carwell – background vocals arranger
- Carl Carwell – background vocals arranger
- David Foster – background vocals arranger
- Felipe Elgueta – engineer
- Humberto Gatica – lead vocal recording
- Peter Doell – assistant engineer
- Mark Agostino – assistant engineer
- Humberto Gatica – mix
- Chris Brooke – assistant
- Paul Boutin – assistant
- Kyle Bess – assistant
- David Foster – keyboards
- Simon Franglen – Synclavier programming
- Michael Thompson – guitars
- Sue Ann Carwell – background vocals
- Carl Carwell – background vocals
- Kofi – background vocals
- Terry Bradford – background vocals
- Alex Brown – background vocals
- Philip Ingram – background vocals
- Maxann Lewis – background vocals
- Will Heaton – background vocals
- Bridgette Bryant-Fiddmont – background vocals
- Alanna Capps – background vocals

== Charts ==
=== Weekly charts ===
Weekly chart performance
Chart (1996)	Peak position
Australia (ARIA)	1
Austria (Ö3 Austria Top 40)	18
Belgium (Ultratop 50 Flanders)	5
Belgium (Ultratop 50 Wallonia)	12
Canada Hit Parade (The Record)	1
Canada Contemporary Hit Radio (The Record)	4
Canada Top Singles (RPM)	2
Canada Adult Contemporary (RPM)	1
Europe (Eurochart Hot 100)	6
Europe (European AC Radio)	3
Europe (European Hit Radio)	5
France (SNEP)	19
Germany (GfK)	13
Hungary (Mahasz)	6
Hungary Radio (HCRA)	2
Iceland (Íslenski Listinn Topp 40)	4
Ireland (IRMA)	2
Israel (Israeli Singles Chart)	8
Netherlands (Dutch Top 40)	4
Netherlands (Single Top 100)	4
New Zealand (Recorded Music NZ)	3
Panama (UPI)	1
Poland (ZPAV Airplay)	10
Quebec Airplay (ADISQ)	1
Scottish Singles Sales (Official Charts)	4
Spain (Top 40 Radio)	22
Sweden (Sverigetopplistan)	24
Switzerland (Schweizer Hitparade)	3
Taiwan (IFPI)	9
UK Singles (Official Charts)	5
UK Airplay (Music Week)	11
US Billboard Hot 100	1
US Adult Contemporary (Billboard)	1
US Adult Pop Airplay (Billboard)	1
US Hot R&B/Hip-Hop Songs (Billboard)	41
US Pop Airplay (Billboard)	1
US Rhythmic Airplay (Billboard)	4
US Cash Box Top 100	1

=== Year-end charts ===
Year-end chart performance
Chart (1996)	Position
Australia (ARIA)	3
Belgium (Ultratop 50 Flanders)	21
Belgium (Ultratop 50 Wallonia)	64
Canada Top Singles (RPM)	5
Canada Adult Contemporary (RPM)	1
Europe (Eurochart Hot 100)	39
Europe (European Hit Radio)	19
France (SNEP)	64
Germany (Media Control)	31
Iceland (Íslenski Listinn Topp 40)	51
Netherlands (Dutch Top 40)	16
Netherlands (Single Top 100)	35
New Zealand (RIANZ)	10
Sweden (Topplistan)	75
Switzerland (Schweizer Hitparade)	20
UK Singles (OCC)	27
UK Airplay (Music Week)	42
US Billboard Hot 100	3
US Adult Contemporary (Billboard)	2
US Adult Top 40 (Billboard)	4
US Top 40/Mainstream (Billboard)	6
US Top 40/Rhythm-Crossover (Billboard)	16
US Top Soundtrack Singles (Billboard)	1

=== Decade-end charts ===
Decade-end chart performance
Chart (1990–1999)	Position
Canada (Nielsen SoundScan)	97
US Billboard Hot 100	18

=== All-time charts ===
All-time chart performance
Chart	Position
Canada (Nielsen SoundScan)	43
US Billboard Hot 100	152

== Certifications and sales ==
Certifications
Region	Certification	Certified units/sales
Australia (ARIA)	2× Platinum	140,000^{^}
Canada (Music Canada)	3× Platinum	240,000^{‡}
Denmark (IFPI Danmark)	Platinum	90,000^{‡}
Germany (BVMI)	Gold	250,000^{^}
New Zealand (RMNZ)	Platinum	10,000^{*}
New Zealand (RMNZ) digital	Platinum	30,000^{‡}
Spain (Promusicae)	Gold	30,000^{‡}
United Kingdom (BPI)	2× Platinum	1,200,000^{‡}
United States (RIAA)	2× Platinum	2,047,000
^{*} Sales figures based on certification alone.^{^} Shipments figures based on certification alone.^{‡} Sales+streaming figures based on certification alone.

== Release history ==
Release history
Region	Date	Format	Labels	Ref.
United States	13 February 1996	Contemporary hit radio	Epic	
United States	19 February 1996	7-inch vinyl; cassette; CD	Epic	
Japan	11 April 1996	3-inch CD	SMEJ	
United Kingdom	20 May 1996	Cassette; CD #1	Epic	
United Kingdom	27 May 1996	CD #2	Epic	

== See also ==
- 1996 in British music
- Billboard Year-End Hot 100 singles of 1996
- Grammy Award for Best Song Written for Visual Media
- List of Australian chart achievements and milestones
- List of Billboard Adult Contemporary number ones of 1996
- List of Billboard Adult Top 40 number-one songs of the 1990s
- List of Billboard Hot 100 number-one singles of the 1990s
- List of Billboard Hot 100 number ones of 1996
- List of Billboard Hot 100 top-ten singles in 1996
- List of Billboard Mainstream Top 40 number-one songs of the 1990s
- List of number-one singles in Australia during the 1990s
- List of top 25 singles for 1996 in Australia
- List of UK top-ten singles in 1996
