= Next Plane Out =

Single by Celine Dion

from the album The Colour of My Love
- Released: 9 October 1995
- Studio: Banana Boat (Burbank); Conway (Hollywood); Capitol (Hollywood); Record Plant (Los Angeles); Ocean Way (Los Angeles)
- Genre: Pop
- Length: 4:57
- Label: Epic
- Songwriter: Diane Warren
- Producer: Guy Roche

Celine Dion singles chronology
"Je sais pas" (1995)	"Next Plane Out" (1995)	"To Love You More" (1995)

Music video
- "Next Plane Out" on YouTube

"Next Plane Out" is a song recorded by Canadian singer Celine Dion for her third English‑language studio album, The Colour of My Love (1993). Written by Diane Warren and produced by Guy Roche, the track was issued by Epic Records as the album's final single in Australia on 9 October 1995.

== Critical reception ==
Pip Ellwood‑Hughes of Entertainment Focus described the recording as "gorgeous" and called it "a vocal masterclass that makes you realise just what an incredible singer Dion is". Christopher Smith of TalkAboutPopMusic described "Next Plane Out" as a ballad "which takes some time to 'get off the ground'".

== Commercial performance ==
In Australia, "Next Plane Out" peaked at number 61 on the ARIA Singles Chart, and remained within the top 100 for seven weeks.

== Music video ==
The accompanying music video was directed by Greg Masuak. Edited versions of the clip were later reused for the singles "Je sais pas" and "Call the Man" in 1997.

== Formats and track listing ==
- Australian cassette and CD single
1. "Next Plane Out" (radio edit) – 4:37
2. "The Last to Know" – 4:36
3. "Love Can Move Mountains" – 4:54

== Charts ==
Chart performance
Chart (1995)	Peak position
Australia (ARIA)	61

== Release history ==
Release history
Region	Date	Format	Label	Ref.
Australia	9 October 1995	Cassette; CD	Epic	
