= Simply Red 25: The Greatest Hits =

Greatest hits album by Simply Red
- Released: 17 November 2008
- Genres: Pop, Blue-eyed soul
- Length: 1:07:57
- Labels: Universal simplyred.com
- Producer: Simply Red

Simply Red chronology
Stay (2007)	Simply Red 25: The Greatest Hits (2008)	Songs of Love (2010)

Singles from Simply Red 25: The Greatest Hits
- 1. "Go Now" Released: 10 November 2008

Professional ratings
Review scores
Source	Rating
AllMusic	4/5 stars
PopMatters	7/10 stars

Simply Red 25: The Greatest Hits is a compilation album by Simply Red, released in 2008 as both a standard and deluxe edition which contained material from their 25-year career. In the US it was released in 1CD format. In Europe it was released in a 2CD format, as well as a 2CD and DVD deluxe edition. The single "Go Now", a cover of Bessie Banks, was released from the album, but failed to chart. The album itself was a moderate success, peaking at #9 on the UK Albums Chart. On 9 October 2010 the album returned to the UK Top Ten, again peaking at #9.

== Track listing ==
=== 2CD Europe version ===
CD 1
No.	Title	Writer(s)	Original album	Length
1.	"Sunrise"	Mick Hucknall, Daryl Hall, John Oates, Sara Allen	Home	3:19
2.	"Stars"	Mick Hucknall	Stars	4:08
3.	"A New Flame"	Mick Hucknall	A New Flame	3:57
4.	"Holding Back the Years"	Mick Hucknall, Neil Moss	Picture Book	4:11
5.	"It's Only Love"	Jimmy Cameron, Vella Cameron	A New Flame	3:52
6.	"The Right Thing"	Mick Hucknall	Men and Women	4:22
7.	"Your Mirror"	Mick Hucknall	Stars	4:04
8.	"For Your Babies"	Mick Hucknall	Stars	4:17
9.	"The Air That I Breathe"	Albert Hammond, Mike Hazlewood	Blue	4:21
10.	"Night Nurse"	Gregory Isaacs, Sylvester Weise	Blue	3:54
11.	"Ain't That a Lot of Love"	Homer Banks, Willa Dean Parker	Love and the Russian Winter	3:53
12.	"Fake"	Mick Hucknall	Home	3:46
13.	"Ev'ry Time We Say Goodbye (simplified version)"	Cole Porter	Simplified	3:06
Total length:				51:16

CD 2
No.	Title	Writer(s)	Original album	Length
1.	"You've Got It"	Mick Hucknall, Lamont Dozier	A New Flame	3:57
2.	"Say You Love Me"	Mick Hucknall	Blue	3:44
3.	"So Not Over You"	Mick Hucknall, Pete Woodroffe, Charlie Grant, Sarah Anne Osuji, Alana Hood, Hannah Thomson	Stay	3:37
4.	"Angel"	Carolyn Franklin, Sonny Saunder	Greatest Hits	4:00
5.	"Never Never Love"	Mick Hucknall	Life	4:07
6.	"Home (Tin Tin Out Radio Mix)"	Mick Hucknall, Steve Lewinson, Peter Lewinson	Home	3:33
7.	"You Make Me Feel Brand New"	Thom Bell, Linda Creed	Home	5:04
8.	"Something Got Me Started"	Mick Hucknall, Fritz McIntyre	Stars	3:59
9.	"Money's Too Tight (to Mention)"	John Valentine, William Valentine	Picture Book	4:29
10.	"Fairground"	Mick Hucknall	Life	4:26
11.	"If You Don't Know Me By Now"	Kenny Gamble, Leon Huff	A New Flame	3:26
12.	"Go Now"	Larry Banks, Milton Bennett	previously unreleased	3:27
Total length:				47:55

=== 1CD US version ===
No.	Title	Writer(s)	Length
1.	"Sunrise"	Mick Hucknall, Daryl Hall, John Oates, Sara Allen	3:19
2.	"Stars"	Mick Hucknall	4:08
3.	"A New Flame"	Mick Hucknall	3:57
4.	"Holding Back The Years"	Mick Hucknall. Neil Moss	4:11
5.	"Your Mirror"	Mick Hucknall	4:04
6.	"For Your Babies"	Mick Hucknall	4:17
7.	"It's Only Love"	Jimmy Cameron, Vella Cameron	3:52
8.	"The Right Thing"	Mick Hucknall	4:22
9.	"Something Got Me Started"	Mick Hucknall, Fritz McIntyre	3:59
10.	"So Not Over You"	Mick Hucknall, Pete Woodroffe, Charlie Grant, Sarah Anne Osuji, Alana Hood, Hannah Thomson	3:37
11.	"You Make Me Feel Brand New"	Thom Bell, Linda Creed	5:04
12.	"Say You Love Me"	Mick Hucknall	3:44
13.	"Home"	Mick Hucknall, Steve Lewinson, Peter Lewinson	3:33
14.	"Fairground"	Mick Hucknall	4:26
15.	"Money's Too Tight (To Mention)"	John Valentine, William Valentine	4:29
16.	"If You Don't Know Me By Now"	Kenny Gamble, Leon Huff	3:26
17.	"Go Now"	Larry Banks, Milton Bennett	3:27
Total length:			1:07:57

== Charts ==
=== Weekly charts ===
Weekly chart performance for Simply Red 25: The Greatest Hits
Chart (2008–2010)	Peak position
Australian Albums (ARIA)	64
Austrian Albums (Ö3 Austria)	25
Belgian Albums (Ultratop Flanders)	14
Belgian Albums (Ultratop Wallonia)	43
Danish Albums (Hitlisten)	11
Dutch Albums (Album Top 100)	3
German Albums (Offizielle Top 100)	17
Irish Albums (IRMA)	26
Italian Albums (FIMI)	19
New Zealand Albums (RMNZ)	11
Portuguese Albums (AFP)	8
Scottish Albums (Official Charts)	15
Slovenian Albums (IFPI)	6
Spanish Albums (Promusicae)	74
Swiss Albums (Schweizer Hitparade)	22
UK Albums (Official Charts)	9

=== Year-end charts ===
2008 year-end chart performance for Simply Red 25: The Greatest Hits
Chart (2008)	Position
UK Albums (OCC)	44

2009 year-end chart performance for Simply Red 25: The Greatest Hits
Chart (2009)	Position
Dutch Albums (Album Top 100)	27
UK Albums (OCC)	131

2010 year-end chart performance for Simply Red 25: The Greatest Hits
Chart (2010)	Position
UK Albums (OCC)	127

== Certifications and sales ==
Certifications and sales for Simply Red 25: The Greatest Hits
Region	Certification	Certified units/sales
Australia (ARIA)	Gold	35,000^{^}
Brazil (Pro-Música Brasil)	Gold	30,000^{*}
Germany (BVMI)	Platinum	200,000^{^}
Italy sales in 2008	—	45,000
Italy (FIMI) sales since 2009	Gold	30,000^{*}
Netherlands (NVPI)	Gold	30,000^{^}
New Zealand (RMNZ)	Gold	7,500^{^}
Poland (ZPAV)	2× Platinum	40,000^{*}
Portugal (AFP)	Gold	10,000^{^}
Russia (NFPF)	Gold	10,000^{*}
Switzerland (IFPI Switzerland)	Gold	15,000^{^}
United Kingdom (BPI)	3× Platinum	900,000^{‡}
^{*} Sales figures based on certification alone.^{^} Shipments figures based on certification alone.^{‡} Sales+streaming figures based on certification alone.
