= Recollections (Simply Red album) =

Studio album by Simply Red
- Released: 21 November 2025
- Genre: Soul pop; soft rock
- Label: simplyred.com
- Producer: Andy Wright

Simply Red chronology
Time (2023)	Recollections (2025)	Holding Back the Years: 40 Years of Simply Red – Live in Santiago (2026)

Singles from Recollections
- 1. "If You Don't Know Me By Now" Released: 29 January 2025; 2. "Money's Too Tight (To Mention)" Released: 7 October 2025; 3. "Fairground" Released: 23 October 2025; 4. "Stars" Released: 6 November 2025

Recollections is the fourteenth studio album by British pop group Simply Red, released on 21 November 2025. It features 40 new recordings of previously released songs in commemoration of the bands 40-year anniversary. The album debuted at number 45 on the UK Albums Chart, becoming Simply Red's 21st top 75 album.

== Track listing ==
Disc 1
No.	Title	Length
1.	"Sad Old Red"
2.	"Come to My Aid"
3.	"Look at You Now"
4.	"Heaven"
5.	"Jericho"
6.	"Money's Too Tight (To Mention)"
7.	"Holding Back the Years"
8.	"Picture Book"
9.	"Open Up the Red Box"
10.	"The Right Thing"
11.	"To Be with You"
12.	"It's Only Love"
13.	"A New Flame"
14.	"You've Got It"

Disc 2
No.	Title	Length
1.	"Ev'ry Time We Say Goodbye"
2.	"If You Don't Know Me By Now"
3.	"Stars"
4.	"Something Got Me Started"
5.	"More"
6.	"Enough"
7.	"Thrill Me"
8.	"Your Mirror"
9.	"For Your Babies"
10.	"Angel"	4:29
11.	"Fairground"
12.	"Never Never Love"
13.	"So Beautiful"

Disc 3
No.	Title	Length
1.	"Mellow My Mind"
2.	"The Air That I Breathe"
3.	"Say You Love Me"
4.	"Night Nurse"
5.	"Ain't That a Lotta Love"
6.	"Home"
7.	"Fake"
8.	"A Song for You"
9.	"Sunrise"
10.	"You Make Me Feel Brand New"
11.	"So Not Over You"
12.	"Thinking of You"
13.	"Just Like You"

- The digital versions slightly alters the sequence of the tracks compared to the physical versions.
- Two vinyl editions exists, a 4LP-version with all 40 tracks and a 2LP version with 20 tracks.

== Charts ==
Chart performance for Recollections
Chart (2025)	Peak position
Austrian Albums (Ö3 Austria)	15
Belgian Albums (Ultratop Flanders)	24
Belgian Albums (Ultratop Wallonia)	55
Dutch Albums (Album Top 100)	19
French Albums (SNEP)	119
German Albums (Offizielle Top 100)	14
German Pop Albums (Offizielle Top 100)	6
Scottish Albums (OCC)	16
Swiss Albums (Schweizer Hitparade)	26
UK Albums (OCC)	45
UK Independent Albums (OCC)	3
