= The Very Best of Simply Red =

Greatest hits album by Simply Red
- Released: 28 April 2003
- Recorded: 1984–1999

The Very Best of Simply Red is a two-CD compilation album by Simply Red, originally released in 2003 in Japan and Europe.

== Track listing ==
=== Hold Me (Disc 1) ===
1. "Stars"
2. "Holding Back the Years" [12" Extended Version]
3. "It's Only Love"
4. "If You Don't Know Me by Now"
5. "You've Got It"
6. "For Your Babies"
7. "Never Never Love"
8. "We're in This Together"
9. "Angel" (featuring Wyclef Jean and Lauryn Hill)
10. "Night Nurse" (with Sly & Robbie)
11. "Say You Love Me"
12. "The Air That I Breathe"
13. "Ev'ry Time We Say Goodbye"
14. "Mellow My Mind"
15. "Someday in My Life"
16. "Heaven"
17. "Love for Sale"
18. "Lady Godiva's Room"
19. "Granma's Hands" [Live at the Montreux Jazz Festival: 8 July 1992]

=== Thrill Me (Disc 2) ===
1. "Money's Too Tight (to Mention)"
2. "Fairground"
3. "Something Got Me Started"
4. "A New Flame"
5. "The Right Thing" [12" Extended Version]
6. "Infidelity"
7. "I Won't Feel Bad"
8. "Come to My Aid" [12" Extended Version]
9. "Your Mirror"
10. "Thrill Me"
11. "Remembering the First Time"
12. "To Be Free"
13. "Ghetto Girl"
14. "Ain't That a Lot of Love"
15. "Jericho"
16. "Thank You"
17. "Come on in My Kitchen" [1999 Version]
18. "I Know You Got Soul" [Live in Australia: August 1989]

== Charts ==
=== Weekly charts ===
Weekly chart performance for The Very Best of Simply Red
Chart (2003)	Peak position
Austrian Albums (Ö3 Austria)	30
Dutch Albums (Album Top 100)	21
German Albums (Offizielle Top 100)	36
Italian Albums (FIMI)	18
Portuguese Albums (AFP)	17
Swiss Albums (Schweizer Hitparade)	28

=== Year-end charts ===
2003 year-end chart performance for The Very Best of Simply Red
Chart (2003)	Position
Dutch Albums (Album Top 100)	91

== Certifications ==
Certifications for The Very Best of Simply Red
Region	Certification	Certified units/sales
Netherlands (NVPI)	Gold	40,000^{^}
^{^} Shipments figures based on certification alone.
