= Song Book 1985–2010 =

Compilation album by Simply Red
- Released: 2 December 2013
- Recorded: 1985–2010
- Genre: Rock; blue-eyed soul; pop; jazz
- Label: Rhino

Simply Red chronology
Simply Red Farewell – Live in Concert at Sydney Opera House (2011)	Song Book 1985–2010 (2013)	Big Love (2015)

Song Book 1985–2010 is a four-disc box set by British soul group Simply Red. It peaked at number 41 in the United Kingdom and was certified Gold for sales of 100,000. It also peaked at number 6 in New Zealand and 16 in Australia in 2015.

== Critical reception ==
Professional ratings
Review scores
Source	Rating
AllMusic	4/5 stars

Stephen Thomas Erlewine from AllMusic says, "All the hits are here, along with enough album tracks to give this weight", adding "the album illustrates the longevity of Mick Hucknall's blue-eyed soul group".

== Track listing ==
CD1: 1980s

1. "Money's Too Tight (To Mention)"
2. "Holding Back the Years"
3. "Sad Old Red"
4. "Come to My Aid"
5. "Open Up the Red Box"
6. "Jericho"
7. "The Right Thing"
8. "Maybe Someday..."
9. "Ev'ry Time We Say Goodbye"
10. "I Won't Feel Bad"
11. "It's Only Love"
12. "If You Don't Know Me by Now"
13. "A New Flame"
14. "You've Got It"
15. "Enough"

CD2: 1990s

1. "Something Got Me Started"
2. "Stars"
3. "For Your Babies"
4. "Thrill Me"
5. "Your Mirror"
6. "Lady Godiva's Room"
7. "Fairground"
8. "Remembering the First Time"
9. "Never Never Love"
10. "We're in This Together"
11. "So Beautiful"
12. "Angel"
13. "Night Nurse" (Sly & Robbie featuring Simply Red)
14. "The Air That I Breathe"
15. "Ghetto Girl"
16. "Ain't That a Lot of Love"
17. "Say You Love Me"

CD3: 2000s

1. "Sunrise"
2. "Your Eyes"
3. "Fake"
4. "You Make Me Feel Brand New"
5. "Home"
6. "My Perfect Love"
7. "Smile"
8. "Sad Old Red"
9. "Positively 4th Street"
10. "Oh! What a Girl!"
11. "Perfect Love"
12. "Stay"
13. "So Not Over You"
14. "The World and You Tonight"
15. "I Have the Love"
16. "A Song for You"
17. "It's You"

CD4: The Band of 2005 (re-recorded at home in 2005)

1. "Picture Book"
2. "Come to My Aid"
3. "Heaven"
4. "Jericho"
5. "Infidelity"
6. "Enough"
7. "So Beautiful"
8. "Out on the Range"
9. "You Make Me Believe"
10. "Mellow My Mind"
11. "The Sky Is a Gypsy"
12. "Something for You"

== Charts ==
Chart (2013–2015)	Peak position
Australian Albums (ARIA)	16
Belgian Albums (Ultratop Flanders)	168
New Zealand Albums (RMNZ)	6
UK Albums (OCC)	41

== Certifications ==
Region	Certification	Certified units/sales
United Kingdom (BPI)	Gold	100,000^{‡}
^{‡} Sales+streaming figures based on certification alone.
