= Greatest Hits (Simply Red album) =

Greatest hits album by Simply Red
- Released: 7 October 1996
- Recorded: 1985–1996
- Genre: Pop
- Length: 63:15
- Label: EastWest
- Producer: Stewart Levine

Simply Red chronology
Life (1995)	Greatest Hits (1996)	Blue (1998)

Singles from Greatest Hits
- 1. "Angel" Released: 28 October 1996

Professional ratings
Review scores
Source	Rating
AllMusic	4.5/5 stars
Robert Christgau	1/3 stars
Music Week	5/5 stars

Greatest Hits is the first compilation album released by British pop and soul group Simply Red, released in 1996, which contained material from their first five studio albums (Picture Book, Men and Women, A New Flame, Stars and Life) along with a cover of Aretha Franklin's 1973 classic "Angel", which featured American hip-hop group Fugees. The album peaked atop the UK Albums Chart and was later certified 6× Platinum by the British Phonographic Industry.

== Track listing ==
All tracks are written by Mick Hucknall, except where noted.

No.	Title	Writer(s)	Original album	Length
1.	"Holding Back the Years"	Mick Hucknall; Neil Moss	Picture Book	4:30
2.	"Money's Too Tight (to Mention)"	John Valentine; William Valentine	Picture Book	4:28
3.	"The Right Thing"		Men and Women	4:23
4.	"It's Only Love"	Jimmy Cameron; Vella Cameron	A New Flame	3:53
5.	"A New Flame"		A New Flame	3:58
6.	"You've Got It"	Hucknall; Lamont Dozier	A New Flame	3:55
7.	"If You Don't Know Me by Now"	Kenny Gamble; Leon Huff	A New Flame	3:27
8.	"Stars"		Stars	4:08
9.	"Something Got Me Started"	Hucknall; Fritz McIntyre	Stars	3:59
10.	"Thrill Me"	Hucknall; McIntyre	Stars	5:04
11.	"Your Mirror"		Stars	4:01
12.	"For Your Babies"		Stars	4:17
13.	"So Beautiful"		Life	4:58
14.	"Angel"	Carolyn Franklin; Sonny Sanders	Previously unreleased	4:00
15.	"Fairground"		Life	4:24

== Charts ==
=== Weekly charts ===
Weekly chart performance for Greatest Hits
Chart (1996–99)	Peak position
Australian Albums (ARIA)	4
Austrian Albums (Ö3 Austria)	1
Belgian Albums (Ultratop Flanders)	2
Belgian Albums (Ultratop Wallonia)	1
Canada Top Albums/CDs (RPM)	35
Dutch Albums (Album Top 100)	3
Finnish Albums (Suomen virallinen lista)	11
German Albums (Offizielle Top 100)	2
Hungarian Albums (MAHASZ)	23
Italian Albums (FIMI)	2
New Zealand Albums (RMNZ)	1
Norwegian Albums (VG-lista)	8
Swedish Albums (Sverigetopplistan)	3
Swiss Albums (Schweizer Hitparade)	4
UK Albums (Official Charts)	1
US Billboard 200	116

Chart (2008)	Peak position
Russian Albums (2M)	10

=== Year-end charts ===
1996 year-end chart performance for Greatest Hits
Chart (1996)	Position
Australian Albums (ARIA)	32
Austrian Albums (Ö3 Austria)	13
Dutch Albums (Album Top 100)	43
German Albums Chart	49
New Zealand Albums (RMNZ)	24
Swedish Albums (Sverigetopplistan)	32
UK Albums (OCC)	8

1997 year-end chart performance for Greatest Hits
Chart (1997)	Position
Australian Albums (ARIA)	48
Belgian Albums (Ultratop Flanders)	85
Dutch Albums (Album Top 100)	50
European Top 100 Albums (Music & Media)	46
UK Albums (OCC)	66

1999 year-end chart performance for Greatest Hits
Chart (1999)	Position
UK Albums (OCC)	200

== Certifications ==
Certifications and sales for Greatest Hits
Region	Certification	Certified units/sales
Argentina (CAPIF)	Gold	30,000^{^}
Australia (ARIA)	4× Platinum	280,000^{^}
Austria (IFPI Austria)	Platinum	50,000^{*}
Belgium (BRMA)	2× Platinum	100,000^{*}
Brazil (Pro-Música Brasil)	Platinum	250,000^{*}
France (SNEP)	2× Gold	200,000^{*}
Germany (BVMI)	Platinum	500,000^{^}
Netherlands (NVPI)	Platinum	100,000^{^}
New Zealand (RMNZ)	Platinum	15,000^{^}
Poland (ZPAV)	2× Platinum	80,000^{*}
Portugal	—	56,000
Spain (Promusicae)	Platinum	100,000^{^}
Sweden (GLF)	Gold	40,000^{^}
Switzerland (IFPI Switzerland)	Gold	25,000^{^}
United Kingdom (BPI)	6× Platinum	1,800,000^{^}
Summaries
Europe (IFPI)	3× Platinum	3,000,000^{*}
Worldwide	—	4,000,000
^{*} Sales figures based on certification alone.^{^} Shipments figures based on certification alone.
