= It's Only Love (Simply Red album) =

Compilation album by Simply Red
- Released: 13 November 2000
- Recorded: 1984–1999
- Genres: Rock, Blue-eyed soul
- Label: East West Records
- Producers: Stewart Levine, Mick Hucknall

Simply Red chronology
Love and the Russian Winter (1999)	It's Only Love (2000)	Home (2003)

Professional ratings
Review scores
Source	Rating
MP3.com	Review

It's Only Love is a compilation album by Simply Red. It was released in 2000 on East West Records. It peaked at #27 in the United Kingdom and #35 in Germany. The album is a compilation album primarily featuring the band's love ballads.

== Track listing ==
1. "If You Don't Know Me by Now"
2. "Holding Back the Years"
3. "Say You Love Me"
4. "The Air That I Breathe"
5. "It's Only Love"
6. "You've Got It"
7. "Ev'ry Time We Say Goodbye"
8. "For Your Babies"
9. "Lady Godiva's Room"
10. "Your Eyes (Mousse T Acoustic)"
11. "Thank You"
12. "Remembering the First Time"
13. "Angel"
14. "Night Nurse"
15. "Never Never Love"
16. "More"
17. "Mellow My Mind"
18. "Stars"
19. "Ain't That a Lot of Love"

== Charts ==
=== Weekly charts ===
Weekly chart performance for It's Only Love
Chart (2000–2001)	Peak position
Australian Albums (ARIA)	99
Austrian Albums (Ö3 Austria)	5
Danish Albums (Hitlisten)	7
Dutch Albums (Album Top 100)	40
German Albums (Offizielle Top 100)	35
Irish Albums (IRMA)	25
Italian Albums (FIMI)	26
Norwegian Albums (VG-lista)	19
Scottish Albums (Official Charts)	39
Swedish Albums (Sverigetopplistan)	19
Swiss Albums (Schweizer Hitparade)	32
UK Albums (Official Charts)	27

=== Year-end charts ===
Year-end chart performance for It's Only Love
Chart (2001)	Position
Austrian Albums (Ö3 Austria)	73

== Certifications ==
Certifications and sales for It's Only Love
Region	Certification	Certified units/sales
Denmark (IFPI Danmark)	Platinum	50,000^{^}
Germany (BVMI)	Gold	150,000^{^}
United Kingdom (BPI)	Gold	100,000^{^}
^{^} Shipments figures based on certification alone.
