= Simply Red Farewell – Live in Concert at Sydney Opera House =

Live album by Simply Red
- Released: 24 May 2011
- Recorded: October 2010
- Venue: Sydney Opera House
- Genre: Pop, soul, dance
- Length: 76.53 (CD)
- Label: Universal Records

Simply Red chronology
Songs of Love (2010)	Simply Red Farewell – Live in Concert at Sydney Opera House (2011)	Song Book 1985-2010 (2013)

Simply Red Farewell – Live in Concert at Sydney Opera House is a live album by Simply Red that was released on 24 May 2011. It was recorded at the Sydney Opera House, in October 2010 during the Farewell Tour 2009 in support of their compilation album 25: The Greatest Hits.

The CD release also includes the DVD of the same concert but with only 16 tracks, while the DVD and Blu-Ray Disc feature 20 tracks. The 4 missing tracks from the CD are: To Be with You, Fake, The Right Thing and Ain't That a Lot of Love.

== Track listing ==
=== CD ===
1. "Out on the Range" 5:51
2. "Your Mirror" 4:10
3. "Heaven" 5:08
4. "Enough" 6:36
5. "For Your Babies" 4:38
6. "You Make Me Feel Brand New" 5:28
7. "If You Don't Know Me by Now" 3:41
8. "It's Only Love" 4:24
9. "Sunrise" 3:27
10. "Come to My Aid" 4:20
11. "The Right Thing" 4:28
12. "Money's Too Tight (To Mention)" 5:20
13. "Stars" 4:06
14. "Fairground" 6:01
15. "Something Got Me Started" 4:30
16. "Holding Back the Years" 4:45

=== DVD / Blu-ray ===
1. "Out on the Range"
2. "Your Mirror"
3. "Jericho"
4. "Heaven"
5. "To Be with You"
6. "Enough"
7. "For Your Babies"
8. "You Make Me Feel Brand New"
9. "If You Don't Know Me by Now"
10. "It's Only Love"
11. "Sunrise"
12. "Come to My Aid"
13. "Fake"
14. "The Right Thing"
15. "Money's Too Tight (To Mention)"
16. "Ain't That a Lot of Love"
17. "Stars"
18. "Fairground"
19. "Something Got Me Started"
20. "Holding Back the Years"

== Charts ==
Chart performance for Simply Red Farewell – Live in Concert at Sydney Opera House
Chart (2011)	Peak position
Austrian Albums (Ö3 Austria)	35
Belgian Albums (Ultratop Flanders)	36
Belgian Albums (Ultratop Wallonia)	44
Dutch Albums (Album Top 100)	32
German Albums (Offizielle Top 100)	13
Italian Albums (FIMI)	35
Norwegian Albums (VG-lista)	26
Swiss Albums (Schweizer Hitparade)	63
