= Songs of Love (Simply Red album) =

Compilation album by Simply Red
- Released: February 2010
- Recorded: 1984–2010
- Genre: Rock, blue-eyed soul, pop
- Length: 46:08
- Label: simplyred.com

Simply Red chronology
Simply Red 25: The Greatest Hits (2008)	Songs of Love (2010)	Simply Red Farewell – Live in Concert at Sydney Opera House (2011)

Songs of Love is a compilation album by Simply Red, released in 2010. It is the band’s second romantic-themed compilation following the release of It’s Only Love in 2000. It peaked at #12 in the United Kingdom and was certified silver.

The album features two new recordings "Beside You" and "I Have The Love". "Beside You" is a remake of the original recording from 1998 by Mick Hucknall for the soundtrack of the film "What Dreams May Come". "Ev'ry Time We Say Goodbye" is the re-recorded version from the album "Simplified".

== Review ==
James Christopher Monger from AllMusic gave the album 3 ½ stars out of 5, saying “This 2010 collection from Simply Red focuses on the group’s romantic side. [The album was] released to coincide with their farewell world tour".

== Track listing ==
1. "Say You Love Me" – 3:48
2. "You Make Me Feel Brand New" – 5:05
3. "Stars" – 4:11
4. "You've Got It" – 3:59
5. "For Your Babies" – 4:20
6. "If You Don't Know Me By Now" – 3:30
7. "It's You" – 3:22
8. "Beside You" – 4:37
9. "Holding Back the Years" – 4:14
10. "Smile" – 3:13
11. "I Have The Love" – 3:13
12. "Ev'ry Time We Say Goodbye" – 3:06

== Charts ==
Chart performance for Songs of Love
Chart (2008)	Peak position
Italian Albums (FIMI)	28
German Albums (Offizielle Top 100)	86
Mexican Albums (Top 100 Mexico)	58
Portuguese Albums (AFP)	5
Swiss Albums (Schweizer Hitparade)	37
UK Albums (OCC)	12

== Certifications ==
Region	Certification	Certified units/sales
Portugal (AFP)	Platinum	20,000^{^}
United Kingdom (BPI)	Silver	60,000^{^}
^{^} Shipments figures based on certification alone.
