= Stars (Simply Red album) =

Studio album by Simply Red
- Released: 30 September 1991
- Recorded: August 1990 – June 1991
- Studios: Condulmer Studio, Venice, Italy
- Genres: Pop, blue-eyed soul
- Length: 41:17
- Label: EastWest
- Producer: Stewart Levine

Simply Red chronology
A New Flame (1989)	Stars (1991)	The Montreux EP (1992)

Singles from Stars
- 1. "Something Got Me Started" Released: 9 September 1991; 2. "Stars" Released: 18 November 1991; 3. "For Your Babies" Released: 27 January 1992; 4. "Thrill Me" Released: 21 April 1992; 5. "Your Mirror" Released: 13 July 1992

Stars is the fourth album by British-based pop/soul/jazz band Simply Red, released on 30 September 1991. Five singles were released from the album, including the UK top ten hits "Stars" and "For Your Babies". The album was a worldwide success, particularly in the band's home country where it has been certified twelve times platinum and was the best-selling album of the year in the UK for both 1991 and 1992, the first album to be the best-seller in two consecutive years since Simon & Garfunkel's Bridge over Troubled Water in 1970–1971. As of April 2019 it is the 14th best-selling album of all time in the UK.

The album was on the shortlist of nominees for the 1992 Mercury Prize. In 2000 Q placed Stars at number 80 in its list of "The 100 Greatest British Albums Ever".

In 2000 it was voted number 258 in Colin Larkin's All Time Top 1000 Albums.

== Composition and recording ==
Recording for the album originally began in Paris in August 1990, but the initial sessions did not go well: the equipment in the studio did not live up to expectations, and with the Gulf War having just started and dominating television news reports, the band found the atmosphere in the bunker-like studios oppressive and not conducive to making music. The group moved to the more relaxed surroundings of Venice to resume recording in the Condulmer Studios.

Simply Red's leader and singer Mick Hucknall had wanted the album to have a less electronic and more soulful sound than their previous work, and had recruited programmer Gota after hearing his work with Soul II Soul. Hucknall did not realise that Gota was also a drummer until he heard him jamming on the drum kit one evening in Venice, after which Gota also became the band's full-time drummer. The songs had been written over the previous year: "Something Got Me Started" and "Stars" had been written on the road during the group's previous tour. "Thrill Me" was based on a riff that McIntyre had come up with, while Hucknall described "Wonderland" as "probably the most political song I've written", documenting his dissatisfaction with the British Conservative government of the time.

== Artwork ==
The album cover features a photograph of singer Hucknall in the Californian desert, wearing a Native American painted cloak that he had bought in Spain. Hucknall had insisted that in the shot he would be wearing the cloak and nothing else, displaying his bare legs. However, when photographer Zanna showed the photographs to EastWest Records, they were concerned that Hucknall's bare legs would offend sensibilities in the US, and Zanna had to digitally retouch the picture using a test photograph of her assistant's jeans-covered legs.

== Release ==
Stars was released on 30 September 1991 and debuted at number one on the UK Albums Chart, selling around 150,000 copies in its first week. After 12 months, the album had sold 2.4 million copies in the UK.

Stars was re-issued in 2008 as a Collector's Edition 2CD with bonus DVD digipack.

== Critical reception ==
Professional ratings
Review scores
Source	Rating
AllMusic	4.5/5 stars
Chicago Tribune	3/4 stars
Entertainment Weekly	B+
NME	4/10
Q	4/5 stars
The Rolling Stone Album Guide	3.5/5 stars
Select	2/5
Smash Hits	7/10
Uncut	4/5 stars
Vox	9/10

The album received mixed reviews in the UK. The alternative music magazines were cool towards the record: in the NME Andrew Collins dismissed Stars as "an exercise in no-style over no-content" and "the sound of some technicians desperately fanning some smouldering ashes for people with central heating", while in Select Graham Linehan disregarded the bulk of the album as "just Simply Red – uniquely anonymous and as flat as Iowa." Caroline Sullivan simply stated in Melody Maker that "within his strictly-defined oeuvre – sleek, airbrushed music best described as soulette – [Hucknall]'s miles ahead of his competition ... Nor, on an objective level, can Stars be faulted ... This is a pleasant album, the sleeve is pretty, and now, at least, you've got a Christmas present for Gran."

However, reviews from newspaper critics and other magazines were more positive. In The Guardian Adam Sweeting wrote that "the new songs sound relaxed, refreshed, and satisfyingly cohesive ... Easy to listen to but not easy listening, Stars keeps shining", while The Independent's Andy Gill was similarly impressed, observing that "Hucknall's socialist soul-boy's conviction and his determination to write songs with stings in their tails place Simply Red several notches above the rest of the smooth soul genre ... And in simple evocations of love like 'Thrill Me' and 'For Your Babies', the spark of honesty sets them above the superficial, insincere protestations of love that dominate modern soul music." In Q Ian Cranna hailed the album as "a long overdue change in musical direction, with Hucknall for the most part abandoning his undoubtedly sincere but inevitably fruitless attempts to re-create himself as a soul singer. Instead he's eased Simply Red down a couple of gears into a more relaxed and flowing style which owes as much towards current hip hop-inspired club rhythms as it does to old-style soul or funk." He ended his review by describing Stars as "Simply Red's most accessible and danceable work to date". In the American press, the Chicago Tribune's Jan DeKnock said that Simply Red had moved "into a funkier groove that suits them well" on Stars, while Entertainment Weekly's Dave DiMartino found that Hucknall's songwriting skills distinguished him from other "merely interpretive" singers; a year after its release, Mark Coleman praised Stars in The Rolling Stone Album Guide as "a stripped-down set of originals, superbly sung without a trace of rootsy nostalgia or gross crossover ambition."

In his retrospective review for AllMusic, Stephen Thomas Erlewine called Stars "Simply Red's best album since their debut. It's smoother and more polished than their previous work, yet Mick Hucknall is singing better than ever and his songwriting is improving ... Having absorbed his pop, soul, and reggae influences, Hucknall is now successfully writing songs in his own style, something that, with the exception of 'Holding Back the Years', he hadn't managed previously."

The album was voted the second-worst record ever made in a 1998 Melody Maker poll of pop stars, DJs, and journalists.

== Track listing ==
=== Original release ===
All songs written and composed by Mick Hucknall, except where noted.

1. "Something Got Me Started" (Hucknall, Fritz McIntyre) – 4:01
2. "Stars" – 4:08
3. "Thrill Me" (Hucknall, McIntyre) – 5:04
4. "Your Mirror" – 3:59
5. "She's Got It Bad" – 3:33
6. "For Your Babies" – 4:17
7. "Model" – 3:46
8. "How Could I Fall" – 4:45
9. "Freedom" – 3:52
10. "Wonderland" – 3:49

=== 2008 Collector's Edition bonus tracks ===
Disc one (CD) – extra tracks

Robert Johnson Sessions

11. "Come On in My Kitchen" (Robert Johnson) – 1:32
12. "Ramblin' on My Mind" (Johnson) – 2:11
13. "Me and the Devil Blues" (Johnson) – 2:03
14. "When You've Got A Good Friend" (Johnson) – 2:00

Live at Hamburg (23 February 1992)

15. "Sad Old Red" (Hucknall) – 5:58
16. "More" (Hucknall) – 4:14
17. "Something Got Me Started" (Hucknall, McIntyre) – 4:12
18. "Thrill Me" (Hucknall, McIntyre) – 5:09
19. "Your Mirror" (Hucknall) – 3:57
20. "She's Got It Bad" (Hucknall) – 3:45

Disc two (CD) – Mixes

1. "Stars" [PM-ized Mix] – 4:10
2. "For Your Babies" [Edition Francais] – 4:06
3. "Something Got Me Started" [E-Smoove's Late Night Mix] – 8:00
4. "Thrill Me" [Steppin' Razor Mix] – 6:37
5. "Freedom" [Perfecto Mix] – 6:24
6. "Stars" [Comprende Mix] – 6:38
7. "Something Got Me Started" [Hurley's 7" Mix] – 3:56
8. "Thrill Me" [Connoisseurs Mix] – 5:56
9. "Freedom" [How Long Mix] – 4:09
10. "Something Got Me Started" [Perfecto Mix] – 5:10
11. "Thrill Me" [Nellee Hooper's Dub Mix] – 4:28
12. "Thrill Me" [Stewart Levine's Club Mix] (iTunes Only Track) – 6:56

Disc three (DVD)

Live at Montreux Jazz Festival (8 July 1992)

1. "Love for Sale" (Cole Porter)
2. "Drowning in My Own Tears" (Henry Glover)
3. "Every Time We Say Goodbye" (Porter)
4. "Sad Old Red" (Hucknall)
5. "Grandma's Hands" (Bill Withers)
6. "Enough" (Hucknall, Joe Sample)
7. "If You Don't Know Me by Now" (Kenny Gamble, Leon Huff)
8. "How Could I Fall" (Hucknall)
9. "Lady Godiva's Room" (Hucknall)
10. "A New Flame" (Hucknall)
11. "Your Mirror" (Hucknall)
12. "She's Got It Bad" (Hucknall)
13. "Model" (Hucknall)
14. "It's Only Love" (Jimmy Cameron, Vella Cameron)
15. "Joy and Pain" (Frankie Beverly)
16. "Come to My Aid" (Hucknall, McIntyre)
17. "Infidelity" (Hucknall, Lamont Dozier)
18. "The Right Thing" (Hucknall)
19. "Holding Back the Years" (Hucknall, Neil Moss)
20. "Stars" (Hucknall)
21. "Open Up the Red Box" (Hucknall)
22. "Thrill Me" (Hucknall, McIntyre)
23. "Money's Too Tight (To Mention)" (John Valentine, William Valentine)
24. "For Your Babies" (Hucknall)
25. "Something Got Me Started" (Hucknall, McIntyre)

Promotional videos

1. "Something Got Me Started"
2. "Stars"
3. "For Your Babies"
4. "Thrill Me"
5. "Your Mirror"

== Personnel ==
Simply Red

- Mick Hucknall – lead vocals, backing vocals
- Fritz McIntyre – keyboards, additional vocals on "Freedom", "Something Got Me Started" and "Wonderland"
- Tim Kellett – keyboards
- Heitor TP – guitars
- Shaun Ward – bass
- Gota Yashiki – drums, percussion, programming
- Ian Kirkham – saxophones

Additional personnel

- Jess Bailey – keyboard programming

Production

- Producer – Stewart Levine
- Co-producer – Mick Hucknall
- Album coordination – Bob Harding
- Engineered and mixed by Darren Klein
- Assistant engineers – Sandro Franchin and Marnie Riley
- Recorded at Condulmer Recording Studios (Venice, Italy).
- Mixed at Conway Studios (Hollywood, CA).
- Mastered by Bernie Grundman at Bernie Grundman Mastering (Hollywood, CA).
- Art direction and photography – Zanna
- Management – Andy Dodd and Elliot Rashman at So What Arts, Ltd.

== Charts ==
=== Weekly charts ===
Weekly chart performance for Stars
Chart (1991–1992)	Peak position
Australian Albums (ARIA)	7
Austrian Albums (Ö3 Austria)	1
Belgian Albums (IFPI)	8
Canada Top Albums/CDs (RPM)	36
Danish Albums (IFPI)	4
Dutch Albums (Album Top 100)	3
European Albums (Music & Media)	1
Finnish Albums (Suomen virallinen lista)	7
French Albums (SNEP)	6
German Albums (Offizielle Top 100)	2
Greek Albums (IFPI)	4
Hungarian Albums (MAHASZ)	11
Icelandic Albums (Tónlist)	2
Irish Albums (IFPI)	2
Italian Albums (Musica e dischi)	2
New Zealand Albums (RMNZ)	2
Norwegian Albums (VG-lista)	11
Portuguese Albums (AFP)	2
Spanish Albums (AFYVE)	12
Swedish Albums (Sverigetopplistan)	7
Swiss Albums (Schweizer Hitparade)	2
UK Albums (Official Charts)	1
US Billboard 200	76
Zimbabwean Albums (ZIMA)	1

=== Year-end charts ===
1991 year-end chart performance for Stars
Chart (1991)	Position
Austrian Albums (Ö3 Austria)	37
Dutch Albums (Album Top 100)	68
European Albums (Music & Media)	46
German Albums (Offizielle Top 100)	54
New Zealand Albums (RMNZ)	42
UK Albums (Gallup)	1

1992 year-end chart performance for Stars
Chart (1992)	Position
Australian Albums (ARIA)	20
Austrian Albums (Ö3 Austria)	4
European Albums (Music & Media)	4
German Albums (Offizielle Top 100)	6
New Zealand Albums (RMNZ)	10
Swiss Albums (Schweizer Hitparade)	9
UK Albums (Gallup)	1

== Certifications and sales ==
Certifications and sales for Stars
Region	Certification	Certified units/sales
Australia (ARIA)	2× Platinum	140,000^{^}
Austria (IFPI Austria)	2× Platinum	100,000^{*}
Brazil (Pro-Música Brasil)	Platinum	250,000^{*}
Canada (Music Canada)	Gold	50,000^{^}
Finland (Musiikkituottajat)	Gold	34,401
France (SNEP)	2× Platinum	600,000^{*}
Germany (BVMI)	5× Gold	1,250,000^{^}
Italy	—	500,000
Japan	—	50,000
Netherlands (NVPI)	2× Platinum	200,000^{^}
New Zealand (RMNZ)	Platinum	15,000^{^}
Spain (Promusicae)	Platinum	100,000^{^}
Switzerland (IFPI Switzerland)	2× Platinum	100,000^{^}
United Kingdom (BPI)	12× Platinum	3,450,000
United States (RIAA)	Gold	579,000
Summaries
Scandinavia	—	150,000
Worldwide	—N/a	9,000,000
^{*} Sales figures based on certification alone.^{^} Shipments figures based on certification alone.

== See also ==
- List of best-selling albums in Germany
- List of best-selling albums in the United Kingdom
