= The Montreux EP =

1992 EP by Simply Red

EP by Simply Red
- Released: 9 November 1992
- Recorded: 8 July 1992
- Venues: Montreux Jazz Festival (Montreux, Switzerland)
- Length: 14:16
- Label: EastWest
- Producer: Stewart Levine

Simply Red chronology
Stars (1991)	The Montreux EP (1992)	Life (1995)

The Montreux EP is an extended play (EP) by British soul and pop band Simply Red, released in November 1992. It was recorded live at the Montreux Jazz Festival on 8 July 1992. The EP reached No. 11 on the UK Singles Chart as well as No. 4 on the Italian Singles Chart and No. 21 on the Irish Singles Chart. It is the first EP the group has released in their career.

== Track listing ==
No.	Title	Writer(s)	Length
1.	"Love for Sale"	Cole Porter	3:55
2.	"Drowning in My Own Tears"	Henry Glover	3:25
3.	"Granma's Hands"	Bill Withers	4:01
4.	"Lady Godiva's Room"	Mick Hucknall	2:55

== Charts ==
=== Weekly charts ===
Chart (1992)	Peak position
Australia (ARIA)	130
Europe (Eurochart Hot 100)	35
Ireland (IRMA)	21
Italy (Musica e dischi)	4
UK Singles (Official Charts)	11

=== Year-end charts ===
Chart (1992)	Position
UK Singles (OCC)	66

== Release history ==
Region	Date	Format(s)	Label(s)	Ref.
United Kingdom	9 November 1992	7-inch vinyl; CD; cassette	EastWest	
Japan	21 December 1992	CD	EastWest	
Australia	18 January 1993	CD; cassette	EastWest	
