= Thrill Me (Simply Red song) =

Single by Simply Red

from the album Stars
- Released: 21 April 1992
- Genre: Blue-eyed soul; sophisti-pop
- Length: 4:18
- Label: Atlantic; EastWest
- Songwriters: Mick Hucknall; Fritz McIntyre
- Producer: Mick Hucknall

Simply Red singles chronology
"For Your Babies" (1992)	"Thrill Me" (1992)	"Your Mirror" (1992)

Music video
- "Thrill Me" on YouTube

"Thrill Me" is a song by British soul and pop band Simply Red. Written by lead singer Mick Hucknall and Fritz McIntyre, it was released in April 1992 by Atlantic and EastWest Records as the fourth single from their fourth album, Stars (1991). The song reached number 33 on the UK Singles Chart in May 1992. It also reached number five in Zimbabwe, number 30 in Ireland and number 58 in the Netherlands, as well as number six on the European Dance Radio Chart. The accompanying music video was directed by Steven Lock and shows the band performing at a concert. The song was later included on the band's compilation albums, Greatest Hits in 1996, Simply Red 25: The Greatest Hits in 2008 and Song Book 1985–2010 in 2013.

== Critical reception ==
Adam Sweeting from The Guardian remarked on the "rough-terrain sway" of "Thrill Me". A reviever from the Liverpool Echo stated that on the song, Hucknall's voice "can still turn your spine to jelly". Caroline Sullivan from Melody Maker said, "A sluicing surrender to lust, [the song] is insidiously good." Pan-European magazine Music & Media wrote that the singer is "again gently shaking his red dreadlocks in a sensual dance rhythm." Alan Jones from Music Week named it Pick of the Week, adding that the song is "bound for the upper reaches of the chart. After the Granada documentary on the band on Sunday, it should also ensure that Stars continues to sell like hotcakes for the foreseeable future."

In a retrospective review, Pop Rescue said it "feels much less structured and slower, and Mick's vocals and lyrics here are weaker", noting its saxophone solo. Karla Peterson from The Press-Courier described it as an "atmospheric ballad". Al Walentis from the Reading Eagle viewed the song as "high-spirited". Johnny Dee from Smash Hits gave it three out of five and described it as a "seriously jazzy meandering, that snoozes along in a relaxing Sunday lay-in fashion." Another Smash Hits editor, Polly Birkbeck, felt the song is "quite a stonker with plinky plonky Elton John piano".

== Track listing ==
7" single, Germany (1992)
No.	Title	Length
1.	"Thrill Me"	3:52
2.	"Thrill Me" (Nellee Hooper Mix)	4:08

12" single, UK (1992)
No.	Title	Length
1.	"Thrill Me" (Connoisseur's Mix)
2.	"Thrill Me" (Stewart Levine's Club Mix)	6:55
3.	"Thrill Me" (Nellee Hooper Dub Mix)

CD single, UK (1992)
No.	Title	Length
1.	"Thrill Me"	3:54
2.	"Thrill Me" (Nellee Hooper Mix)	4:07
3.	"Thrill Me" (Live)	5:15
4.	"When You've Got a Good Friend"	1:58

== Charts ==
=== Weekly charts ===
Chart (1992)	Peak position
Australia (ARIA)	109
Europe (European Dance Radio)	6
Ireland (IRMA)	30
Netherlands (Dutch Top 40 Tipparade)	4
Netherlands (Single Top 100)	58
UK Singles (OCC)	33
UK Airplay (Music Week)	8
UK Dance (Music Week)	53
UK Club Chart (Music Week)	45
Zimbabwe (ZIMA)	5

=== Year-end charts ===
Chart (1992)	Position
UK Airplay (Music Week)	61
