= Something Got Me Started =

1991 single by Simply Red

Single by Simply Red

from the album Stars
- B-side: "A New Flame"; "Come On in My Kitchen"
- Released: 9 September 1991
- Studio: Condulmer (Venice, Italy)
- Genre: Funk; soul
- Length: 4:01
- Label: EastWest
- Composers: Mick Hucknall; Fritz McIntyre
- Lyricist: Mick Hucknall
- Producer: Stewart Levine

Simply Red singles chronology
"You've Got It" (1989)	"Something Got Me Started" (1991)	"Stars" (1991)

Music video
- "Something Got Me Started" on YouTube

"Something Got Me Started" is a song by British soul and pop band Simply Red, released in September 1991 by EastWest Records as the first single from their fourth album, Stars (1991). It was released in several forms: a 7-inch single, a 12-inch single, and a CD single, that includes a remix by Perfecto (Paul Oakenfold and Steve Osborne).

The song became successful around the world, peaking at number 11 in the United Kingdom and charting within the top 10 in New Zealand and several European countries. It was less successful than the band's previous hits in North America, peaking at number 11 in Canada, and number 23 and 20 on the US Billboard Hot 100 and Cash Box Top 100, respectively. Its accompanying music video was directed by Andy Morahan and partly filmed in Spain.

"Something Got Me Started" was included on the band's compilation albums, Greatest Hits in 1996, Simply Red 25: The Greatest Hits in 2008 and Song Book 1985–2010 in 2013.

== Development and composition ==
Simply Red had achieved considerable commercial and critical success from the mid-1980s onwards with their own blue-eyed soul style that saw them repeatedly reach the top 10 around the world. Despite the 1989 album A New Flame selling over two million copies in the UK alone, frontman Mick Hucknall was keen to develop the sound of the band further. The same year A New Flame was released, a number of dance-orientated records had started to infiltrate the UK singles chart, most notably the songs from the group Soul II Soul.

In 2005, when interviewed for the Classic Albums episode on the making of the Stars album, Hucknall commented that he wanted a programmed drum sound that didn't sound synthetic. This led him to working with new musicians, including musician Gota Yashiki whose expertise with drum programming effectively replaced founder drummer Chris Joyce. Producer Stewart Levine also introduced Hucknall to Heitor Pereira which changed the guitar sound on the record, putting more emphasis on rhythm than melody. An early version of the song "Something Got Me Started" was premiered in a March 1990 concert in Didsbury, Manchester, whilst the group were promoting A New Flame (later released on the VHS/Laserdisc Let Me Take You Home).

== Release ==
Released in the United Kingdom on 9 September 1991, "Something Got Me Started" reached number 11 on the UK Singles Chart, and a number of remixes by artists such as Steve 'Silk' Hurley and Paul Oakenfold helped it to achieve success on both the UK and European dance charts. On 30 September, the song was released in Australia, while in Japan, a mini-CD single was issued on 25 October. "Something Got Me Started" was later re-recorded for the 2005 album Simplified, and re-released as a single in January 2006. The song has remained in Simply Red's live set lists since it was first premiered in 1990 and is often played as a final encore.

== Critical reception ==
AllMusic editor Jon O'Brien opined that the "funky piano-led" song and "Stars" justify the Stars album's multi-platinum success. Larry Flick from Billboard magazine felt the track "maintains the Brit-eyed soul of previous hits", noting that Mick Hucknall "turns in an unusually restrained vocal, which adds depth and maturity to an already potent track." Swedish Expressen described it as "bouncy". Dave Sholin from the Gavin Report commented, "Red hot from the moment they reached America's shores, the Mick Hucknall-led Simply Red outfit forged an intensely loyal following." He added that reminiscent of their 1986 hit, "Money's Too Tight (to Mention)", "this uptempo groove is too strong to ignore." Adam Sweeting from The Guardian remarked that "without batting an eyelid, they swiftly get a bit of heat going under" "Something Got Me Started". Caroline Sullivan from Melody Maker felt it's "epitomising the uppish, zesty ambience" of the Stars album. Pan-European magazine Music & Media complimented it as "state of the art Simply Red. Mick Hucknall's star is still shining bright on this 'Money's Too Tight (to Mention)' type of song." A reviewer from People Magazine noted its "peppy lite funk". Al Walentis from Reading Eagle called it "brassy". Richard Paton from Toledo Blade named it a "soulful groove". Johnny Dee from Smash Hits complimented it as "superb".

== Retrospective response ==
Ellen Fagan for CultureSonar ranked "Something Got Me Started" number one in their list of "Simply Red's Top 10 Songs" in 2018. She wrote that here, Simply Red "charges out of the proverbial gate with great impact. The dizzyingly beautiful video entices the eye with lithe, dancing silhouettes, a European backdrop, and delicious '80s overdrive. Another "love gone wrong" song with some lyrics but counters that with an upbeat tempo, powerful harmonies and a "call and answer" format of "I'd give it all up for you/(yes I would)" that builds in an irresistible crescendo." In a 2015 retrospective review, Pop Rescue stated that the vocal melody here, sat alongside the funky bass and piano, "really gives this a light, upbeat feeling."

== Music video ==
The official music video for the song was directed by British film and music video director Andy Morahan who later directed videos for the Simply Red songs "Fake" and "Home" in Sicily. It was partly shot in Seville, Spain. The video features Hucknall dancing indoors and in the street, silhouettes of the band playing and a central female character who is seen in a number of city locations and riding on the back of a scooter.

== Simplified version ==
"Something Got Me Started" was one of the eight previously released Simply Red songs re-recorded for the 2005 album Simplified. It also became the second single release from the album, as a double A-side with a new cover of the Leon Russell song "A Song for You".

== Track listings ==
- 7-inch, cassette, and mini-CD single
1. "Something Got Me Started"
2. "A New Flame"
- UK 12-inch single

A1. "Something Got Me Started" (Perfecto mix)
B1. "Something Got Me Started" (instrumental)
B2. "A New Flame"

- UK CD single
1. "Something Got Me Started"
2. "Come on in My Kitchen"
3. "A New Flame"
4. "Something Got Me Started" (Perfecto mix)
- US 12-inch single

A1. "Something Got Me Started" (Hurley's house remix) – 5:56
A2. "Something Got Me Started" (Hurley's dub) – 5:44
B1. "Something Got Me Started" (E-Smoove's Late Night mix) – 5:00
B2. "Something Got Me Started" (Smoove dub mix) – 5:44

- US CD single
1. "Something Got Me Started" – 4:00
2. "Come on in My Kitchen" – 1:30
3. "If You Don't Know Me by Now" – 3:24
4. "Something Got Me Started" (Perfecto mix) – 5:13

== Credits and personnel ==
Credits are lifted from the Stars album booklet.

Studios

- Recorded at Condulmer Recording Studio (Venice, Italy)
- Mixed at Conway Studios (Los Angeles)
- Mastered at Bernie Grundman Mastering (Los Angeles)

Simply Red

- Mick Hucknall – words, music, vocals, backing vocals, co-production
- Fritz McIntyre – music, additional vocals, keyboards
- Tim Kellett – keyboards
- Heitor Pereira – guitars
- Ian Kirkham – saxophone
- Gota Yashiki – drums, percussion, programs
- Shaun Ward – bass guitar

Other personnel

- Stewart Levine – production
- Daren Klein – mixing, engineering
- Sandro Franchin – assistant engineering
- Marnie Riley – assistant mix engineering
- Bernie Grundman – mastering

== Charts ==
=== Weekly charts ===
Chart (1991–1992)	Peak position
Australia (ARIA)	29
Austria (Ö3 Austria Top 40)	5
Belgium (Ultratop 50 Flanders)	15
Canada Top Singles (RPM)	11
Canada Adult Contemporary (RPM)	33
Denmark (IFPI)	5
Europe (Eurochart Hot 100)	9
Europe (European Dance Radio)	1
Europe (European Hit Radio)	1
Finland (Suomen virallinen lista)	20
France (SNEP)	19
Germany (GfK)	11
Greece (IFPI)	7
Ireland (IRMA)	8
Israel (Israeli Singles Chart)	2
Italy (Musica e dischi)	7
Luxembourg (Radio Luxembourg)	1
Netherlands (Dutch Top 40)	5
Netherlands (Single Top 100)	3
New Zealand (Recorded Music NZ)	10
Sweden (Sverigetopplistan)	18
Switzerland (Schweizer Hitparade)	6
UK Singles (Official Charts)	11
UK Airplay (Music Week)	1
UK Dance (Music Week)	43
UK Club Chart (Record Mirror)	7
US Billboard Hot 100	23
US 12-inch Singles Sales (Billboard)	31
US Adult Contemporary (Billboard)	21
US Dance Club Play (Billboard)	13
US Cash Box Top 100	20

=== Year-end charts ===
Chart (1991)	Position
Canada Top Singles (RPM)	80
Europe (Eurochart Hot 100)	99
Europe (European Hit Radio)	18
Israel (Israeli Singles Chart)	33
Netherlands (Dutch Top 40)	64
Netherlands (Single Top 100)	67
UK Singles (OCC)	92

Chart (1992)	Position
Germany (Media Control)	95

== Certifications ==
Region	Certification	Certified units/sales
United Kingdom (BPI) with "A Song for You"	Silver	200,000^{‡}
^{‡} Sales+streaming figures based on certification alone.
