= Blue (Simply Red album) =

Studio album by Simply Red
- Released: 19 May 1998
- Studio: Westpoint Recording Studios, Funny Bunny Studios, Whitfield Street Studios and Abbey Road Studios (London, UK); Archer Studios (Kingston, Jamaica); The Hit Factory (New York City, New York, US)
- Genre: Pop; soul; dance-pop
- Length: 46:59
- Label: East West
- Producer: Andy Wright; Gota Yashiki; Mick Hucknall; Stevie J

Simply Red chronology
Greatest Hits (1996)	Blue (1998)	Love and the Russian Winter (1999)

Singles from Blue
- 1. "Night Nurse" Released: September 1997; 2. "Say You Love Me" Released: 27 April 1998; 3. "The Air That I Breathe" Released: 10 August 1998; 4. "Ghetto Girl" Released: November 1998 (UK); 5. "To Be Free" Released: November 1998 (EU)

Blue is the sixth studio album by British band Simply Red. It was released by East West Records on 19 May 1998 in the United Kingdom. Initially conceived as a cover album, it features production from lead singer Mick Hucknall as well as Andy Wright, Gota Yashiki, Stevie J, and Joe "Jake" Carter. Hucknall, Wright, and Yashiki are the only musicians featured in the Blue CD booklet's photography; this is a first for a Simply Red album, as all prior albums featured photos of the various band members credited.

The album includes five cover versions: "Mellow My Mind" from the 1975 Neil Young album Tonight's the Night; two versions of the frequently covered "The Air That I Breathe", written by Albert Hammond and Mike Hazlewood; the Gregory Isaacs hit "Night Nurse"; and "Ghetto Girl" by Dennis Brown, from whom the band would cover another song in 2003. New versions of previously recorded Simply Red songs also appear here: "Come Get Me Angel" is a rewritten version of the 1996 single "Angel" (an Aretha Franklin cover), and "Broken Man" was first released as a B-side in 1987. "The Air That I Breathe Reprise" samples "Jack and Diane" by John Mellencamp. "So Jungiful", found on the Japanese edition of the album, is a jungle remix of "So Beautiful" from the band's previous album, Life.

== Critical reception ==
Professional ratings
Review scores
Source	Rating
AllMusic	2.5/5 stars
The Baltimore Sun	(favorable)

AllMusic editor Stephen Thomas Erlewine found that Blue "is weak on original material. However, Mick Hucknall makes up for the deficits by assembling a good collection of outside material [...] Initially, Blue was going to be a covers album, and judging by these numbers [...] it would have been a great, sultry listen. Instead, he's followed through on an album that accentuates his weaknesses as a writer. Granted, he can oversing on occasion, but if Blue does anything, it proves that his voice is his greatest talent and that he should dedicate himself to material that serves it well."

== Track listing ==
Standard version
No.	Title	Writer(s)	Producer(s)	Length
1.	"Mellow My Mind"	Neil Young	Andy Wright; Gota Yashiki; Mick Hucknall	3:55
2.	"Blue"	Hucknall	Wright; Yashiki; Hucknall	4:38
3.	"Say You Love Me"	Hucknall	Wright; Yashiki; Hucknall	3:43
4.	"To Be Free"	Hucknall	Wright; Yashiki; Hucknall	4:04
5.	"The Air That I Breathe"	Albert Hammond; Mike Hazlewood	Wright; Yashiki; Hucknall	4:24
6.	"Someday in My Life"	Hucknall	Wright; Yashiki; Hucknall	4:03
7.	"The Air That I Breathe Reprise"	Hammond; Hazlewood; William Turpin; Steven Jordan	Jordan; Joe "Jake" Carter^{[a]}	4:35
8.	"Night Nurse"	Gregory Isaacs; Sylvester Weise	Hucknall	3:57
9.	"Broken Man"	Hucknall	Wright; Yashiki; Hucknall	3:34
10.	"Come Get Me Angel"	Carolyn Franklin; Sonny Sanders; Hucknall	Wright; Yashiki; Hucknall	4:02
11.	"Ghetto Girl"	Dennis Brown	Hucknall	3:31
12.	"Love Has Said Goodbye Again"	Hucknall	Hucknall	3:14
13.	"High Fives"	Hucknall	Hucknall	2:49

Japan bonus track
No.	Title	Writer(s)	Producer(s)	Length
14.	"So Jungiful"	Hucknall	Hucknall	4:46

2008 Special Edition bonus tracks
No.	Title	Writer(s)	Producer(s)	Length
14.	"Ghetto Girl" (Blood & Fire Sound System Mix)	Brown	Hucknall; Blood & Fire Sound System^{[a]}	3:31
15.	"To Be Free" (Livin' Joy A-Hanetta Mix)	Hucknall	Wright; Yashiki; Hucknall; Livin' Joy^{[a]}	4:04
16.	"Love Has Said Goodbye Again" (Rae & Christian Mix)	Hucknall	Hucknall; Rae & Christian^{[a]}	3:14
17.	"So Jungiful"	Hucknall	Hucknall	4:46
18.	"Tu Sei Dentro Di Me"	Hucknall	Wright; Yashiki; Hucknall	4:03

Notes

- ^a signifies an additional producer

== Personnel ==
Simply Red

- Mick Hucknall – lead vocals, backing vocals
- Tim Vine – keyboards
- Andy Wright – programming
- Mark Jaimes – guitars
- Steve Lewinson – bass guitar
- Velroy Bailey – drums
- Gota Yashiki – drums, programming
- Ian Kirkham – saxophones
- John Johnson – trombone
- Sarah Brown – backing vocals
- Dee Johnson – backing vocals

Additional musicians

- Paul Carrack – keyboards
- Alan Clark – keyboards
- Robbie Lyn – keyboards
- Ned Douglas – programming
- Stephen Hilton – programming
- Aidan Love – programming
- Kenji Jammer – guitar
- Tony Remy – guitar
- Bub Roberts – guitar
- Lloyd "Gitsy" Willis – guitar
- Robbie Shakespeare – bass guitar
- CJ Taylor – bass guitar
- Sly Dunbar – drums
- Geoff Holroyde – drums
- Mike Greenwood – trumpet, flugelhorn
- David Whitaker – orchestra arrangements and conductor
- Pro Arte Orchestra of London – orchestra
- Tru Indeed – backing vocals (7)

Production

- AGM – album producers
- Stevie J – co-producer (7)
- Roland Herrington – recording
- Femi Jiya – recording
- John Lee – recording, mix engineer
- Alex Marou – recording
- Lynford "Fatta" Marshall – recording
- Dave Tyler – recording
- Ted Wohlson – recording
- Paul Logas – mix engineer, mixing (7)
- Tony Maserati – mix engineer, mixing (7)
- Ali Staton – mix engineer
- Douglas Blair – assistant engineer
- Jake Davies – assistant engineer
- Andrew Dudman – assistant engineer
- Ricky Graham – assistant engineer
- Derek Grey – assistant engineer
- Neil Mason – assistant engineer
- Dave Russell – assistant engineer
- Andy Scade – assistant engineer
- Mak Togashi – assistant engineer
- Mick Hucknall – mixing (1–5, 8–12)
- Andy Wright – mixing (1, 2, 8, 9, 12)
- Gota Yashiki – mixing (1–6, 8–10, 12)
- Kevin Metcalfe – mastering at The Town House (London, UK)
- Merv Pearson – pre-production programming
- Intro – design
- Carolyn Quartermaine – art direction, photography
- Zanna – photography

== Charts ==
=== Weekly charts ===
Weekly chart performance for Blue
Chart (1998)	Peak position
Australian Albums (ARIA)	38
Austrian Albums (Ö3 Austria)	1
Belgian Albums (Ultratop Flanders)	4
Belgian Albums (Ultratop Wallonia)	3
Dutch Albums (Album Top 100)	25
French Albums (SNEP)	21
German Albums (Offizielle Top 100)	1
Hungarian Albums (MAHASZ)	11
Italian Albums (FIMI)	4
New Zealand Albums (RMNZ)	13
Norwegian Albums (VG-lista)	17
Swedish Albums (Sverigetopplistan)	5
Swiss Albums (Schweizer Hitparade)	3
UK Albums (Official Charts)	1
US Billboard 200	145

=== Year-end charts ===
1998 year-end chart performance for Blue
Chart (1998)	Position
Austrian Albums (Ö3 Austria)	8
Belgian Albums (Ultratop Flanders)	93
Belgian Albums (Ultratop Wallonia)	40
European Albums (Top 100)	18
German Albums (Offizielle Top 100)	16
UK Albums (OCC)	23

== Certifications and sales ==
Certifications and sales for Blue
Region	Certification	Certified units/sales
Austria (IFPI Austria)	Platinum	50,000^{*}
Belgium (BRMA)	Gold	25,000^{*}
Denmark (IFPI Danmark)	Platinum	50,000^{^}
Germany (BVMI)	Gold	250,000^{^}
New Zealand (RMNZ)	Gold	7,500^{^}
Spain (Promusicae)	Gold	50,000^{^}
Switzerland (IFPI Switzerland)	Gold	25,000^{^}
United Kingdom (BPI)	2× Platinum	600,000^{^}
Summaries
Europe (IFPI)	Platinum	1,000,000^{*}
Worldwide	—	1,200,000
^{*} Sales figures based on certification alone.^{^} Shipments figures based on certification alone.
