= Lady Godiva's Room =

1987 song by Simply Red

Song by Simply Red
- A-side: "Infidelity"
- B-side: "Lady Godiva's Room"
- Released: May 1987 (album); May 1992 (single)
- Genre: Blue-eyed soul
- Length: 3:20
- Songwriter(s): Mick Hucknall
- Producer(s): Mick Hucknall

"Lady Godiva's Room" is a 1987 song by Simply Red. Written by Mick Hucknall, it was featured on the extended play The Montreux EP five years after its original release as the B-side of "Infidelity". It reached number 11 on the UK chart when released in November 1992.

This track was also included in the compilation album It's Only Love (2000).
