= A New Flame =

Studio album by Simply Red
- Released: 13 February 1989
- Recorded: 1988–1989
- Studios: AIR Studios (Montserrat, West Indies)
- Genre: Blue-eyed soul
- Length: 41:03
- Labels: Elektra; WEA
- Producer: Stewart Levine

Simply Red chronology
Men and Women (1987)	A New Flame (1989)	Stars (1991)

Singles from A New Flame
- 1. "It’s Only Love" Released: 16 January 1989; 2. "If You Don’t Know Me By Now" Released: 27 March 1989; 3. "A New Flame" Released: 26 June 1989; 4. "You've Got It" Released: 16 October 1989

Professional ratings
Review scores
Source	Rating
AllMusic	4/5 stars
Robert Christgau	C+
Los Angeles Times	3/4 stars
The New York Times	(favorable)
Number One	4/5 stars
Rolling Stone	2/5 stars

A New Flame is the third album by British pop and soul group Simply Red, released in February 1989. It was a huge success worldwide, becoming the band's first UK number one album and certified 7× Platinum by the BPI for sales of 2,100,000 copies in the UK alone. The album was also certified Gold in the US by the RIAA.

== Track listing ==
Side one

1. "It's Only Love" (Jimmy Cameron, Vella Cameron) – 4:58
2. "A New Flame" (Mick Hucknall) – 3:57
3. "You've Got It" (Hucknall, Lamont Dozier) – 3:55
4. "To Be with You" (Hucknall) – 3:22
5. "More" (Hucknall) – 4:08

Side two

6. "Turn It Up" (Hucknall, Dozier) – 4:35
7. "Love Lays Its Tune" (Hucknall) – 4:05
8. "She'll Have to Go" (Hucknall) – 3:10
9. "If You Don't Know Me by Now" (Kenny Gamble, Leon Huff) – 3:24
10. "Enough" (Hucknall, Joe Sample) – 5:10

=== 2008 Collector’s Edition bonus tracks ===
Disc one

11. "I Wish" [Live Version] (Stevie Wonder) – 4:05
12. "X" (Fritz McIntyre, Ian Kirkham, Tim Kellett, Chris Joyce, Tony Bowers) – 4:51
13. "The Great Divide" (S.H.T.G.) ["She’ll Have To Go" Extended Version] (Hucknall) – 3:56
14. "Sugar Daddy" (McIntyre, Kirkham, Kellett, Joyce, Bowers) – 3:40
15. "Funk On Out" [Instrumental] (Hucknall) – 3:31

Disc two (DVD)

'Let Me Take You Home'— Live at Manchester 1990

1. "Grandma’s Hands" (Bill Withers)
2. "More" (Hucknall)
3. "Groovy Situation" (Keith Barrington Rowe)
4. "Lady Godiva’s Room" (Hucknall)
5. "Holding Back the Years" (Hucknall, Neil Moss)
6. "Sad Old Red" (Hucknall)
7. "Enough" (Hucknall, Sample)
8. "Turn It Up" (Hucknall, Dozier)
9. "Something Got Me Started"
10. "If You Don't Know Me by Now"
11. "It's Only Love"
12. "Everytime We Say Goodbye"
13. "Resume"

== Personnel ==
Simply Red

- Mick Hucknall – lead vocals and backing vocals
- Fritz McIntyre – keyboards, backing vocals
- Tim Kellett – keyboards, trumpet, live backing vocals
- Heitor TP – guitars
- Tony Bowers – bass
- Chris Joyce – drums
- Ian Kirkham – saxophones

Guest musicians

- Erik Hanson – synthesizer programming
- Larry Williams – synthesizer programming
- Lenny Castro – percussion
- Stephanie Spruill – backing vocals

Production

- Producer – Stewart Levine
- Engineered and mixed by Daren Klein
- Assistant engineers – Clark Germain and Karl Lever
- Recorded at AIR Studios (Montserrat, West Indies)
- Mixed at Ocean Way Recording (Los Angeles, California)
- Mastered by Bernie Grundman at Bernie Grundman Mastering (Hollywood, California)
- Design – Peter Barrett and Andrew Biscomb
- Cover photograph – Juergen Teller
- Inner sleeve photos – Shelia Rock and Juergen Teller

== Charts ==
=== Weekly charts ===
Weekly chart performance for A New Flame
Chart (1989)	Peak position
Australian Albums (ARIA)	2
Austrian Albums (Ö3 Austria)	2
Canada Top Albums/CDs (RPM)	15
Dutch Albums (Album Top 100)	4
European Albums (Music & Media)	1
Finnish Albums (Suomen virallinen lista)	9
German Albums (Offizielle Top 100)	2
Greek Albums (IFPI)	2
Icelandic Albums (Tónlist)	1
Irish Albums (IFPI)	1
Italian Albums (Musica e dischi)	1
Japanese Albums (Oricon)	39
New Zealand Albums (RMNZ)	1
Norwegian Albums (VG-lista)	4
Spanish Albums (AFYVE)	9
Swedish Albums (Sverigetopplistan)	4
Swiss Albums (Schweizer Hitparade)	1
UK Albums (Official Charts)	1
US Billboard 200	22

=== Year-end charts ===
Year-end chart performance for A New Flame
Chart (1989)	Position
Australian Albums (ARIA)	10
Austrian Albums (Ö3 Austria)	2
Canada Top Albums/CDs (RPM)	43
Dutch Albums (Album Top 100)	15
European Albums (Music & Media)	5
German Albums (Offizielle Top 100)	2
New Zealand Albums (RMNZ)	4
Norwegian Summer Period Albums (VG-lista)	9
Swiss Albums (Schweizer Hitparade)	1
UK Albums (Gallup)	2
US Billboard 200	44

== Certifications and sales ==
Certifications and sales for A New Flame
Region	Certification	Certified units/sales
Australia (ARIA)	3× Platinum	210,000^{^}
Austria (IFPI Austria)	Platinum	50,000^{*}
Belgium (BRMA)	Gold	25,000^{*}
Brazil (Pro-Música Brasil)	Gold	100,000^{*}
Canada (Music Canada)	Platinum	100,000^{^}
France (SNEP)	Platinum	300,000^{*}
Germany (BVMI)	Platinum	500,000^{^}
Italy	—	470,000
Netherlands (NVPI)	2× Platinum	200,000^{^}
New Zealand (RMNZ)	Platinum	15,000^{^}
Spain (Promusicae)	Platinum	100,000^{^}
Sweden (GLF)	Gold	50,000^{^}
Switzerland (IFPI Switzerland)	Platinum	50,000^{^}
United Kingdom (BPI)	7× Platinum	2,100,000^{^}
United States (RIAA)	Gold	500,000^{^}
Summaries
Worldwide	—	6,000,000
^{*} Sales figures based on certification alone.^{^} Shipments figures based on certification alone.
