= Your Mirror =

1992 single by Simply Red

Single by Simply Red

from the album Stars
- Released: 13 July 1992
- Genre: Pop; pop rock
- Length: 4:08
- Label: EastWest
- Songwriter: Mick Hucknall
- Producers: Stewart Levine; Mick Hucknall

Simply Red singles chronology
"Thrill Me" (1992)	"Your Mirror" (1992)	"Fairground" (1995)

Music video
- "Your Mirror" on YouTube

"Your Mirror" is a song by British soul and pop band Simply Red. Written by Mick Hucknall and produced by him with Stewart Levine, it was released in July 1992 by EastWest Records as the fifth single from the band's fourth album, Stars (1991), and reached number 17 on the UK Singles Chart. The song was later included on the band's compilation albums, Greatest Hits in 1996, Simply Red 25: The Greatest Hits in 2008 (on which an alternative recording with a prominent guitar solo is featured) and Song Book 1985–2010 in 2013.

== Critical reception ==
Rik Ambelle from Crawley News complimented the song as "haunting". Dave Tianene from Milwaukee Sentinel described it as "a sort of inner dialogue of a man torn between idealism and cynicism, done in Temptations ballad style." Robbert Tilli from Music & Media felt that it showcases Hucknall's "talent for writing soulful pop." In a retrospective review, Pop Rescue found that it's "stronger" than the previous songs on the Stars album, "with its bass and piano hooks", adding further that the singer "takes a harder lyrical and vocal approach, almost menacing at times." Johnny Dee from Smash Hits declared it as a "great tune", and "dreamy and wafty". Another Smash Hits editor, Polly Birkbeck, said it's "a droning slowie with a chorus of birdies chirping all through it."

== Track listings ==
- YZ689 7-inch
1. "Your Mirror"
2. "Your Mirror" (live)
- YZ689C cassette
1. "Your Mirror"
2. "Your Mirror" (live)
- YZ689CD holographic disc
1. "Your Mirror"
2. "Sad Old Red" (live in Hamburg, Feb 23, 1992)
3. "She's Got It Bad" (live in Hamburg, Feb 24, 1992)
- YZ689CDX limited-edition holographic disc
1. "Your Mirror" (live in Hamburg, Feb 23, 1992)
2. "More" (live in Hamburg, Feb 23, 1992)
3. "Something Got Me Started" (live in Hamburg, Feb 23, 1992)

== Charts ==
Chart (1992)	Peak position
Australia (ARIA)	120
Europe (Eurochart Hot 100)	52
France (SNEP)	65
Germany (Official German Charts)	59
Ireland (IRMA)	28
UK Singles (OCC)	17
UK Airplay (Music Week)	11
