= Tribute to Bobby =

Studio album by Mick Hucknall
- Released: 19 May 2008
- Recorded: 2008
- Studio: Home Studios and Sphere Studios (London, UK).
- Genre: Blues, jazz, pop
- Label: SimplyRed.com
- Producer: Andy Wright, Gavin Goldberg

Tribute to Bobby is a 2008 album by Simply Red frontman Mick Hucknall under the mononym 'Hucknall' and was his first solo album. It was released in the United Kingdom on 19 May 2008 and is a collection of songs in tribute to the blues singer Bobby Bland. The album charted at number 18 in the UK Official Albums Chart and spent two weeks inside the Top 75.

A DVD was also released along with the album. It contains a documentary which was filmed in Memphis, Tennessee in November 2007.

== Track listing ==
1. "Farther Up the Road" (Joe Medwick, Don Robey) – 3:27
2. "Ain't That Lovin' You" (Deadric Malone) – 3:09
3. "I'm Too Far Gone (To Turn Around)" (Belford Hendricks, Clyde Otis) – 2:15
4. "Poverty" (Dave Clark, Pearl Woods) – 3:19
5. "Yolanda" (Daniel Moore) – 3:56
6. "Stormy Monday Blues" (Aaron "T-Bone" Walker) – 2:39
7. "I Wouldn't Treat a Dog (The Way You Treated Me)" (Steve Barri, Michael Omartian, Michael Price, Dan Walsh) – 3:11
8. "I'll Take Care of You" (Brook Benton) – 2:56
9. "Chains of Love" (Ahmet Nugetre) – 2:59
10. "I Pity the Fool" (Malone) – 3:36
11. "Cry, Cry, Cry" (Malone) – 3:45
12. "Lead Me On" (Malone) – 2:17

== Personnel ==
- Mick Hucknall – lead and backing vocals
- David Clayton – keyboards, acoustic piano, Wurlitzer electric piano, Hammond organ, clarinet
- Andy Wright – keyboards, acoustic piano, programming, guitars, bass, backing vocals
- Gavin Goldberg – keyboards, programming, guitars
- Dave Bloor – programming
- Kenji Suzuki – guitars
- Steve Lewinson – bass, double bass
- Peter Lewinson – drums
- Ian Kirkham – saxophones
- John "Snakehips" Johnson – trombone
- Kevin Robinson – trumpet
- Jim McWilliam – strings
- Sarah Brown – backing vocals

Production

- Andy Wright – producer
- Gavin Goldberg – co-producer, recording, mixing (1, 12)
- Dave Bloor – recording
- Andy Scade – recording
- Johnny Wow – mixing (2–11)
- Kevin Metcalfe – mastering at The Soundmasters (London, UK)
- Peacock Design – art direction, design
- Paul Cox – photography
- Andy Fallon – photography
- John Stoddart – photography
- Giles Petard Collection – photo library
- Anthony Dry – line illustration
- Andy Dodd and Ian Greenfeld at Silentway Management, Ltd. – management
- Andrea Mills – management assistant
