= Picture Book (Simply Red album) =

Studio album by Simply Red
- Released: 11 October 1985
- Studios: Soundpush, Blaricum, Netherlands; RAK, London
- Genres: Sophisti-pop; blue-eyed soul
- Length: 44:21
- Label: Elektra
- Producer: Stewart Levine

Simply Red chronology
Picture Book (1985)	Men and Women (1987)

Singles from Picture Book
- 1. "Money's Too Tight (to Mention)" Released: 20 May 1985; 2. "Come to My Aid" Released: 2 September 1985; 3. "Holding Back the Years" Released: 4 November 1985; 4. "Jericho" Released: February 1986; 5. "Open Up the Red Box" Released: 28 July 1986

Picture Book is the debut studio album by British pop and soul group Simply Red, released in October 1985. It contains the US number-one single "Holding Back the Years", and covers of the Valentine Brothers' "Money's Too Tight (to Mention)" and Talking Heads' "Heaven". Three more singles were released from the album: "Come to My Aid", "Jericho", and "Open Up the Red Box".

The album helped Simply Red earn a 1987 Grammy nomination for Best New Artist. "Holding Back the Years" was also nominated for Best Pop Performance by a Duo or Group With Vocals.

A special version of the album was released on the then new Compact Disc + Graphics, or CD+G format which when played on a suitable CD player, 4 bit raster graphic images, text and animations would also be displayed on a connected TV screen.

== Critical reception ==
Professional ratings
Review scores
Source	Rating
AllMusic	4.5/5 stars
Encyclopedia of Popular Music	4/5 stars
Q	4/5 stars
The Village Voice	B+

In The Village Voice, Robert Christgau wrote that there were essentially "only two songs on this album", "Money's Too Tight (to Mention)" and "Heaven", but that Hucknall and the band carry off the album "on mood and groove alone".

Reviewing the 1996 re-release for Q, Nick Duerden described Picture Book as "the most accomplished debut of its year". He said of Hucknall, "With the most prodigious voice this side of Motown and a burning socialist heart, here he infuses everything with a passion that he's rarely matched since."

William Ruhlmann, in a retrospective review in AllMusic, felt that Simply Red produced "a steady R&B groove reminiscent of '60s Stax house band the MG's" and that Hucknall was a "big-voiced soul singer". In the book 1001 Albums You Must Hear Before You Die, Andy Robbins attributed the record's commercial success in both America and the UK to "Holding Back the Years", which he feels is Hucknall's best vocal performance. Robbins noted rock and jazz sounds, along with soul influences.

== Commercial performance ==
The album was commercially successful, appearing in the top 30 album charts of twelve countries, and achieving platinum certification sales in four countries, including the United States and United Kingdom.

== Track listing ==
All tracks written by Mick Hucknall, except where noted.

Side one
No.	Title	Writer(s)	Length
1.	"Come to My Aid"	Hucknall, Fritz McIntyre	4:03
2.	"Sad Old Red"		4:33
3.	"Look at You Now"		3:02
4.	"Heaven"	David Byrne, Jerry Harrison	4:32
5.	"Jericho"		6:03

Side two
No.	Title	Writer(s)	Length
1.	"Money's Too Tight (to Mention)"	John Valentine, William Valentine	4:13
2.	"Holding Back the Years"	Hucknall, Neil Moss	4:30
3.	"(Open Up the) Red Box"		3:56
4.	"No Direction"	Hucknall, Dave Fryman	3:41
5.	"Picture Book"	Hucknall, McIntyre	5:49

=== 2008 Collector's Edition bonus tracks ===
Disc one, CD: remixes
No.	Title	Writer(s)	Length
1.	"Money's Too Tight (to Mention)" (The Cutback Mix)	John Valentine, William Valentine	8:29
2.	"Come to My Aid" (Survival Mix)	Hucknall, McIntyre	6:40
3.	"Holding Back the Years" (Extended Mix)	Hucknall, Neil Moss	5:48
4.	"Jericho" (Extended Mix)		6:47
5.	"Open Up the Red Box" (Extended Mix)		6:24

Disc two, DVD: Live at Montreux Jazz Festival (8 July 1986)

1. "Grandma's Hands" (Bill Withers)
2. "Sad Old Red"
3. "Open Up the Red Box"
4. "The Right Thing"
5. "No Direction" (Hucknall, Fryman)
6. "I Won't Give Up"
7. "Holding Back the Years" (Hucknall, Neil Moss)
8. "Picture Book" (Hucknall, Fritz McIntyre)
9. "Love Fire" (Bunny Wailer)
10. "Jericho"
11. "I Won't Feel Bad" (Hucknall, McIntyre, Tim Kellett, Chris Joyce, Tony Bowers, Sylvan Richardson)
12. "Suffer" (Hucknall, Lamont Dozier)
13. "Infidelity" (Hucknall, Dozier)
14. "Money's Too Tight (to Mention)" (John Valentine, William Valentine)
15. "Come to My Aid" (Hucknall, McIntyre)
16. "Jericho" [Instrumental]
17. "Heaven" (Byrne, Harrison)
18. "Move on Out"
19. "Look at You Now"

== Personnel ==
Simply Red

- Mick Hucknall – lead and backing vocals, acoustic piano
- Fritz McIntyre – keyboards, backing vocals
- Tim Kellett – keyboards, trumpet, live backing vocals
- Sylvan Richardson – guitars
- Tony Bowers – bass
- Chris Joyce – drums, percussion

Guest Musicians

- David Fryman – guitars (8), backing vocals (8)
- Ronnie Ross – baritone saxophone (2, 4, 5)
- Ian Dickson – tenor saxophone (2, 4, 5)
- Francis Foster – congas (1, 3)

Production

- Producer – Stewart Levine
- Engineered and mixed by Femi Jiya
- Assistant engineer – Chris Dickie
- Mastered by Arun Chakraverty at Master Room (London, England)
- CD mastering – Barry Diament
- Sleeve design – Peter Barrett
- Front cover photo – Simon Fowler
- Back cover photo – Malcolm Heywood

== Charts ==
=== Weekly charts ===
Weekly chart performance for Picture Book
Chart (1986)	Peak position
Australian Albums (Kent Music Report)	6
Austrian Albums (Ö3 Austria)	10
Canada Top Albums/CDs (RPM)	7
Dutch Albums (Album Top 100)	1
European Albums (Music & Media)	4
German Albums (Offizielle Top 100)	8
Icelandic Albums (Tónlist)	1
Italian Albums (Musica e dischi)	8
New Zealand Albums (RMNZ)	9
Spanish Albums (AFYVE)	12
Swedish Albums (Sverigetopplistan)	26
Swiss Albums (Schweizer Hitparade)	12
UK Albums (Official Charts)	2
US Billboard 200	16

=== Year-end charts ===
1986 year-end chart performance for Picture Book
Chart (1986)	Position
Australian Albums (Kent Music Report)	16
Canada Top Albums/CDs (RPM)	29
Dutch Albums (Album Top 100)	2
European Albums (Music & Media)	7
German Albums (Offizielle Top 100)	8
New Zealand Albums (RMNZ)	21
UK Albums (Gallup)	20
US Billboard 200	49

1987 year-end chart performance for Picture Book
Chart (1987)	Position
Australian Albums (Kent Music Report)	58
Dutch Albums (Album Top 100)	77
European Albums (Music & Media)	90
UK Albums (Gallup)	52

== Certifications and sales ==
Certifications and sales for Picture Book
Region	Certification	Certified units/sales
Australia (ARIA)	2× Platinum	140,000^{^}
Austria (IFPI Austria)	Gold	25,000^{*}
Belgium (BRMA)	Gold	25,000^{*}
France (SNEP)	Gold	100,000^{*}
Germany (BVMI)	3× Gold	750,000^{^}
Italy (FIMI)	Gold	250,000
Netherlands (NVPI)	Platinum	100,000^{^}
New Zealand (RMNZ)	Platinum	15,000^{^}
Spain (Promusicae)	Gold	50,000^{^}
Switzerland (IFPI Switzerland)	Platinum	50,000^{^}
United Kingdom (BPI)	5× Platinum	1,500,000^{^}
United States (RIAA)	Platinum	1,000,000^{^}
^{*} Sales figures based on certification alone.^{^} Shipments figures based on certification alone.
