= Stars (Simply Red song) =

1991 single by Simply Red

Single by Simply Red

from the album Stars
- B-side: "Ramblin' on My Mind"; "Something Got Me Started" (remix)
- Released: 18 November 1991
- Studio: Condulmer (Venice, Italy)
- Genre: Soul; pop
- Length: 4:08
- Label: EastWest
- Songwriter: Mick Hucknall
- Producer: Stewart Levine

Simply Red singles chronology
"Something Got Me Started" (1991)	"Stars" (1991)	"For Your Babies" (1992)

Music video
- "Stars" on YouTube

"Stars" is a song by British soul and pop band Simply Red, released in November 1991 by EastWest Records as the second single from their fourth album of the same name (1991). Written by lead singer Mick Hucknall and produced by Stewart Levine, it became the first single from the album to enter the UK top 10, reaching number eight in December 1991. Outside the UK, "Stars" reached the top 10 in Denmark, Israel, Italy, Luxembourg, and Zimbabwe. In the United States, it climbed to number 44 on the Billboard Hot 100, marking the band's last appearance on the listing.

Q Magazine included "Stars" in their list of the "1001 Best Songs Ever" in 2003. The song was featured on the band's compilation albums, Greatest Hits in 1996, Simply Red 25: The Greatest Hits in 2008 and Song Book 1985–2010 in 2013.

== Critical reception ==
AllMusic editor Jon O'Brien described the song as "wistful dreamy". Billboard magazine viewed it as a "midtempo crooner". Jan DeKnock from Chicago Tribune felt that the group's "move into a funkier groove" suited them well, especially on the "charmingly upbeat" "Stars" and "Something Got Me Started". Writing for CultureSonar in 2018, Ellen Fagan wrote, "This exquisite ballad references a couple who love one another but are unlikely to walk off into the sunset together for various reasons. Because of that, both are destined to walk away reeling. The video released with the song is a vintage '80s masterpiece of surrealism; the whole package emerges as a mournful tune with a yearning, otherworldly feel." A reviewer from Dundee Courier deemed it a "slowie". Dave Tianene from Milwaukee Sentinel remarked that the song features "a delicately soulful vocal".

Pan-European magazine Music & Media found that it has numerous allusions, including references to Mick Hucknall's own road to fame and to the stars in the European flag. They added, "This soulful pop song confirms the position of the red-headed singer at the top, close to the galactic stars." In a retrospective review, Pop Rescue stated that Hucknall "hits those notes with perfection in the chorus, resulting in a wonderfully warm and catchy track." Karla Peterson from The Press-Courier declared it as "swooning" and "one of the most open-hearted love songs Hucknall has ever written." In 2014, Luke Turner from The Quietus remarked that the song itself "holds up wonderfully", adding that "there's not a huge amount going on, but that's what makes it work: piano, terrific drums, layers of vocals, and a load of bonus hints of chorus snuck in amongst the verses." Richard Paton from Toledo Blade complimented it as a "soulful groove". Johnny Dee from Smash Hits said it is "superb".

== Chart performance ==
"Stars" became a top-10 hit in Denmark, Italy, Luxembourg and the United Kingdom, where the single peaked at number eight during its third week on the UK Singles Chart. It entered the top 20 in Austria, Belgium, Germany, Ireland, the Netherlands and Switzerland, as well as the top 30 in France and the top 40 in Sweden. On the Eurochart Hot 100, "Stars" peaked at number 19 on 18 January 1991. Outside Europe, the single reached number two in Israel, number eight in Zimbabwe, number 17 in Canada, number 29 in Australia, number 32 in New Zealand and number 44 on the US Billboard Hot 100. In 2013, the song charted in Japan, where it peaked at number 49 on the Japan Hot 100. "Stars" received a platinum record in the United Kingdom, with sales and streams of over 600,000 units.

== Music video ==
The accompanying music video for "Stars" was released in November 1991 and features Hucknall wandering around a desert surrounded by large gold stars with close-ups of him and a woman. It was directed by Zanna and edited by Marc Eskenazi.

== Track listings ==
- 7-inch, cassette, and mini-CD single
1. "Stars" – 4:08
2. "Stars" (PM-ized mix) – 4:12
- 12-inch single

A1. "Stars" (Comprende mix)
A2. "Stars" (PM-ized mix)
B1. "Ramblin' on My Mind"
B2. "Something Got Me Started" (Hurley's house mix)

- CD single
1. "Stars"
2. "Ramblin' on My Mind"
3. "Stars" (Comprende mix)
4. "Something Got Me Started" (Hurley's house mix)
- 1993 mini-CD single
1. "Stars"
2. "Thrill Me" (Stewart Levine's club mix)

== Credits and personnel ==
Credits are lifted from the Stars album booklet.

Studios

- Recorded at Condulmer Recording Studio (Venice, Italy)
- Mixed at Conway Studios (Los Angeles)
- Mastered at Bernie Grundman Mastering (Los Angeles)

Simply Red

- Mick Hucknall – words, music, vocals, backing vocals, co-production
- Fritz McIntyre – additional vocals, keyboards
- Tim Kellett – keyboards
- Heitor Pereira – guitars
- Ian Kirkham – saxophone
- Gota Yashiki – drums, percussion, programs
- Shaun Ward – bass guitar

Other personnel

- Stewart Levine – production
- Daren Klein – mixing, engineering
- Sandro Franchin – assistant engineering
- Marnie Riley – assistant mix engineering
- Bernie Grundman – mastering

== Charts ==
=== Weekly charts ===
Chart (1991–1992)	Peak position
Australia (ARIA)	29
Austria (Ö3 Austria Top 40)	18
Belgium (Ultratop 50 Flanders)	16
Canada Top Singles (RPM)	17
Canada Adult Contemporary (RPM)	4
Denmark (IFPI)	9
Europe (Eurochart Hot 100)	19
Europe (European Hit Radio)	3
France (SNEP)	24
Germany (GfK)	19
Ireland (IRMA)	13
Israel (Israeli Singles Chart)	2
Italy (Musica e dischi)	2
Luxembourg (Radio Luxembourg)	4
Netherlands (Dutch Top 40)	15
Netherlands (Single Top 100)	15
New Zealand (Recorded Music NZ)	32
Sweden (Sverigetopplistan)	32
Switzerland (Schweizer Hitparade)	11
UK Singles (Official Charts)	8
UK Airplay (Music Week)	1
UK Dance (Music Week)	25
US Billboard Hot 100	44
US Adult Contemporary (Billboard)	8
US Cash Box Top 100	32
US Pop (Radio and Records)	24
Zimbabwe (ZIMA)	8

Chart (2013)	Peak position
Japan Hot 100 (Billboard)	49

Chart (2025)	Peak position
Russia Streaming (TopHit)	99

=== Year-end charts ===
Chart (1991)	Position
UK Singles (OCC)	89

Chart (1992)	Position
Canada Adult Contemporary (RPM)	35
Europe (European Hit Radio)	38
Germany (Media Control)	65
Israel (Israeli Singles Chart)	7
US Adult Contemporary (Billboard)	35

== Certifications ==
Region	Certification	Certified units/sales
Denmark (IFPI Danmark)	Gold	45,000^{‡}
New Zealand (RMNZ)	Platinum	30,000^{‡}
United Kingdom (BPI)	Platinum	600,000^{‡}
^{‡} Sales+streaming figures based on certification alone.

== Release history ==
Region	Date	Format(s)	Label(s)	Ref.
United Kingdom	18 November 1991	7-inch vinyl; 12-inch vinyl; CD	EastWest	
Australia	16 December 1991	CD; cassette	EastWest	
Japan	21 December 1991	Mini-CD	EastWest Japan	
Japan	25 March 1993	Mini-CD	EastWest Japan	
