= For Your Babies =

1992 single by Simply Red

Single by Simply Red

from the album Stars
- B-side: "Freedom"; "Me & the Devil Blues"
- Released: 27 January 1992
- Studio: Condulmer (Venice, Italy)
- Genre: Pop; R&B
- Length: 4:18
- Label: EastWest
- Songwriter: Mick Hucknall
- Producer: Stewart Levine

Simply Red singles chronology
"Stars" (1991)	"For Your Babies" (1992)	"Thrill Me" (1992)

Music video
- "For Your Babies" on YouTube

"For Your Babies" is a song by British soul and pop band Simply Red. Written by Mick Hucknall and produced by Stewart Levine, it was released in January 1992, by East West Records, as the third single from the band's fourth album, Stars (1991). The song reached number nine on the UK Singles Chart in February the same year. It also reached the top 20 in Ireland and the top 30 in Austria and Belgium. The accompanying music video was directed by Andrew Morahan. The track was included on the band's compilation albums, Greatest Hits in 1996, Simply Red 25: The Greatest Hits in 2008 and Songs of Love in 2010. It was also featured on the band's acoustic album Simplified in a new version.

== Critical reception ==
Larry Flick from Billboard magazine felt that here, Mick Hucknall "offers an unusually restrained and completely effective performance on this delicately arranged R&B gem." Clark and DeVaney from Cashbox noted that the song "is set at a mellow, easy-listening pace. Following in the footsteps of their previous material, they have perfectly matched the above-average production with the soft-tone vocals." Rufer and Fell from the Gavin Report called it "the ultimate Mother's Day record delivered with loving sentimentality by Mr. Hucknall." Adam Sweeting from The Guardian described it as the singer's "exquisite tear-jerking showpiece". Pan-European magazine Music & Media described it as a "very gentle, vulnerable pop ballad, thoughtfully arranged and featuring some fine Spanish acoustic guitar licks."

A reviewer from Music Week stated, "An uncluttered and pretty ballad with no hiding place, it certainly draws a fine performance from Hucknall, full of nuances and pure, clear phrasing. A smash." Newcastle Journal described it as an "honest ballad". People Magazine remarked that Hucknall's singing "is still the hook in Simply Red's music, sliding gently in a pillow-soft upper register." Karla Peterson from The Press-Courier viewed it as "a tender tribute to parenthood in times of trouble". Johnny Dee from Smash Hits called it a "soulful, smoochy track", giving it a score of four out of five.

== Retrospective response ==
Writing for CultureSonar in 2018, Ellen Fagan felt that Hucknall "was never more appealing than in this ballad of a proud dad serenading his little child with loving hopes for his future during the sleepless days of early parenthood. Hucknall had his first baby decades after this was written, so his ability to conjure up such a scenario is deliciously prescient." musicOMH declared it as a "perfect romantic ballad". In a 2015 retrospective review, Pop Rescue complimented it as "a wonderfully gentle track, laden with piano, bass, and acoustic guitar", where the singer "takes a leisurely stroll through the lyrics."

== Music video ==
A black-and-white music video was produced to promote the single, directed by British commercial, film and music video director Andrew Morahan.

== Track listings ==
7-inch, cassette, and mini-CD single
No.	Title	Length
1.	"For Your Babies"	4:16
2.	"For Your Babies" (edition francais)	4:06

12-inch single
No.	Title	Length
1.	"For Your Babies"	4:15
2.	"For Your Babies" (edition francais)	4:06
3.	"Freedom" (Perfecto mix)	6:25

CD single
No.	Title	Length
1.	"For Your Babies"	4:15
2.	"For Your Babies" (edition francais)	4:06
3.	"Me & the Devil Blues"	1:59
4.	"Freedom" (How Long? mix)	4:09

US cassette single
No.	Title	Length
1.	"For Your Babies"
2.	"Freedom" (How Long? mix)

== Credits and personnel ==
Credits are lifted from the Stars album booklet.

Studios

- Recorded at Condulmer Recording Studio (Venice, Italy)
- Mixed at Conway Studios (Los Angeles)
- Mastered at Bernie Grundman Mastering (Los Angeles)

Simply Red

- Mick Hucknall – words, music, vocals, backing vocals, co-production
- Fritz McIntyre – additional vocals, keyboards
- Tim Kellett – keyboards
- Heitor Pereira – guitars
- Ian Kirkham – saxophone
- Gota Yashiki – drums, percussion, programs
- Shaun Ward – bass guitar

Other personnel

- Stewart Levine – production
- Daren Klein – mixing, engineering
- Sandro Franchin – assistant engineering
- Marnie Riley – assistant mix engineering
- Bernie Grundman – mastering

== Charts ==
=== Weekly charts ===
Chart (1992)	Peak position
Australia (ARIA)	55
Austria (Ö3 Austria Top 40)	23
Belgium (Ultratop 50 Flanders)	30
Canada Top Singles (RPM)	39
Europe (Eurochart Hot 100)	24
Europe (European Hit Radio)	4
France (SNEP)	46
Germany (GfK)	43
Ireland (IRMA)	11
Netherlands (Dutch Top 40 Tipparade)	6
Netherlands (Single Top 100)	40
New Zealand (Recorded Music NZ)	47
UK Singles (Official Charts)	9
UK Airplay (Music Week)	4
UK Club Chart (Music Week) "Freedom"	27
US Adult Contemporary (Billboard)	24

=== Year-end charts ===
Chart (1992)	Position
Brazil (Crowley)	32
UK Singles (OCC)	86
UK Airplay (Music Week)	38

== Certifications ==
Region	Certification	Certified units/sales
United Kingdom (BPI)	Silver	200,000^{‡}
^{‡} Sales+streaming figures based on certification alone.

== Release history ==
Region	Date	Format(s)	Label(s)	Ref.
United Kingdom	27 January 1992	7-inch vinyl; 12-inch vinyl; CD; cassette	EastWest	
Japan	25 February 1992	Mini-CD	EastWest Japan	
Australia	6 April 1992	CD; cassette	EastWest	
