= The Valentine Brothers =

1977–1987 American recording act

- Origin: Columbus, Ohio
- Genre: Soul
- Years active: 1977–1987
- Labels: Source, A&M
- Past members: John Valentine; William Valentine

The Valentine Brothers were an American recording act in the late 1970s and 1980s, comprising brothers John and William "Billy" Valentine. One of their biggest hits, as singers and songwriters, was "Money's Too Tight (to Mention)", which reached no. 41 in the R&B chart in 1982 and was later recorded with greater worldwide success by Simply Red.

== Career ==
The brothers were born in Columbus, Ohio. Billy Valentine performed as a singer with Young-Holt Unlimited in the mid-1970s, before joining with his brother John to begin performing as The Valentine Brothers in 1975. Starting in 1977, they began a three-year stint as part of the touring company of The Wiz musical. Their first self-titled album was issued by Source Records in 1979, and their second album, First Take in 1982, featured the single "Money's Too Tight (to Mention)", written by the duo and produced by Bobby Lyle. The record spent 14 weeks on the Billboard R&B chart, reaching no. 41. The following year, another track from the album, "Let Me Be Close To You", also reached the R&B chart. In 1984, their third album, Have a Good Time, issued by A&M Records, produced their biggest chart hit, "Lonely Nights", which reached no. 28 on the R&B chart. Their final album, Picture This, was released in 1987.

Billy Valentine also performed in the 1980s on the soundtracks of the films Champions Forever and The Five Heartbeats, before joining the show It Ain't Nothin' But the Blues in Los Angeles in the late 1990s. He has also worked as a demo recording artist and songwriter, and as a singer in Los Angeles clubs. Since 2004 he has sung on the soundtrack of the hit TV series Boston Legal.

== Discography ==
=== Albums ===
Year	Album	Label	US R&B
1979	The Valentine Brothers	Source Records	—
1982	First Take	Bridge Records	46
1984	Have a Good Time	A&M Records	40
1987	Picture This	EMI America	—
"—" denotes releases that did not chart or were not released.

=== Singles ===
Year	Single	Peak chart positions	
Year	Single	US R&B	UK
1978	"Sound of Music"	―	—
1979	"We Belong Together"	―	―
1982	"Let Me Be Close to You"	43	—
1982	"Money's Too Tight (to Mention)"	41	73
1984	"Lonely Nights"	28	—
1984	"When (I Love You)"	―	—
1984	"Have a Good Time"	—	—
1984	"I Thank You"	―	―
1987	"No Better Love"	—	―
"—" denotes releases that did not chart or were not released.
