= Adam Sweeting =

British rock critic and writer

- Occupations: Writer; television critic; rock critic
- Years active: 1970s–present
- Employer: The Arts Desk
- Website: theartsdesk.com/users/adam-sweeting

Adam Sweeting is a British rock critic and writer. Graeme Thomson, writing for The Guardian, deemed him as an "influential journalist" of the 1970s. He currently writes film and television reviews for The Arts Desk.

== Biography ==
Sweeting started writing in 1979 for publications such as Beat Instrumental, Trouser Press, Australian magazine RAM and NME. In 1980, he became a feature editor for Melody Maker and briefly collaborated with Sounds. In 1985, he stopped collaborating with Melody Maker to work for The Guardian and Q. Sweeting has interviewed musicians such as Kate Bush, Neil Young, Tom Waits and Joni Mitchell and has written over 800 articles for The Guardian, including hundreds of obituaries. Since the 2000s, he has also published articles and interviews in The Times, The Independent on Sunday, and The Telegraph. His articles have also appeared on I and The Irish Times. He is now a regular contributor for The Arts Desk reviewing television. He is also one of the founding members of The Arts Desk.

Sweeting signed as a partner for VTVC, a TV production company that developed programmes broadcast on Channel 4. He is also the author of several books, including Simple Minds published by Sidgwick & Jackson in 1988, and Cover Versions – Singing Other People's Songs published by Pimlico in 2004.
