= You've Got It =

Single by Simply Red

from the album A New Flame
- Released: 16 October 1989
- Length: 3:55
- Label: Elektra; WEA
- Songwriters: Mick Hucknall; Lamont Dozier
- Producer: Stewart Levine

Simply Red singles chronology
"A New Flame" (1989)	"You've Got It" (1989)	"Something Got Me Started" (1991)

Music video
- "You've Got It" on YouTube

"You've Got It" is a song by the English soul and pop band Simply Red, released in October 1989 by Elektra and WEA as the fourth and final single from their third studio album, A New Flame (1989). The song was written by the band's frontman Mick Hucknall and Lamont Dozier, and produced by Stewart Levine. It was a top-20 hit in Ireland, peaking at number 14. In the UK, the song peaked at number 46 on the UK Singles Chart, while reaching number 48 in Canada and 127 in Australia

== Critical reception ==
Siân Pattenden from Smash Hits wrote, "This is another smoochy ballad all about lurve and that sort of stuff. The Red seem to have found their "niche" and are not afraid of repeating their winning formula with every other single released so, consequently, this isn't very adventurous. The guitars on this one are "sensitive" and Mick does sing with more reserve than usual, but try as he might, he sounds about as sensitive as a gravel mouthwash. Having said that, this could be a very big hit."

== Track listings ==
- 7-inch single, Europe (1989)
1. "You've Got It" – 3:55
2. "Holding Back the Years" (live acoustic version) – 3:41
- CD mini, Europe (1989)
1. "You've Got It" – 3:58
2. "Holding Back the Years" (live acoustic version) – 3:43
3. "I Wish" (Live) – 4:03
- CD maxi-single, US (1989)
1. "You've Got It" (LP version) – 3:54
2. "Holding Back the Years" (live acoustic) – 3:41
3. "I Know You Got Soul" – 4:05
4. "I Wish" – 4:01

== Charts ==
Chart (1989)	Peak position
Australia (ARIA)	127
Canada Top Singles (RPM)	48
Ireland (IRMA)	14
UK Singles (OCC)	46
