= Night Nurse (Gregory Isaacs song) =

1982 song by Gregory Isaacs

Single by Gregory Isaacs

from the album Night Nurse
- Released: 1982
- Genre: Reggae; lovers rock
- Length: 7:00
- Label: Mango, Island
- Songwriters: Gregory Isaacs, Sylvester Weise
- Producers: Gregory Isaacs, Flabba Holt

"Night Nurse" is a song by Jamaican reggae artist Gregory Isaacs, released as a single in 1982 after signing to Island Records. It is the title track of his 1982 album of the same name, which was a top-40 hit on the UK Albums Chart. At the time, "Night Nurse" was hugely popular in the clubs and received heavy radio play. The song was later used in adverts for a GlaxoSmithKline cold and flu remedy of the same name on British TV and radio. A cover version in 1997 by Sly and Robbie featuring Simply Red became a hit single in the UK.

BBC Radio 1 disc jockey Chris Goldfinger named "Night Nurse" one of his favourite songs in 1996, adding, "Gregory has a unique voice and singing style. I love the lyrics. Gregory is always my all-time favourite."

== Certifications ==
Region	Certification	Certified units/sales
United Kingdom (BPI)	Silver	200,000^{‡}
^{‡} Sales+streaming figures based on certification alone.

== Sly and Robbie version ==
"Night Nurse"

Single by Sly and Robbie featuring Simply Red

from the album Friends and Blue
- Released: September 1997
- Genre: Reggae
- Length: 3:54
- Label: EastWest
- Songwriters: Gregory Isaacs, Sylvester Weise
- Producers: Sly Dunbar, Robbie Shakespeare

Sly and Robbie singles chronology
"Boops (Here to Go)" (1987)	"Night Nurse" (1997)	"Superthruster" (1999)

Simply Red singles chronology
"Angel" (1996)	"Night Nurse" (1997)	"Say You Love Me" (1998)

Music video
- "Night Nurse" on YouTube

"Night Nurse" was covered by the Jamaican duo Sly and Robbie featuring the English band Simply Red. It was released as a single in September 1997, by EastWest Records, and appears on Sly and Robbie's album, Friends (1997), as well as Simply Red's sixth album, Blue (1998). The song reached No. 13 on the UK Singles Chart in September 1997, and remained on the chart for eight weeks. It is Sly and Robbie's second biggest hit in the United Kingdom, after 1987's "Boops (Here to Go)" at No. 12. It also became Simply Red's sixteenth non-consecutive top 20 hit in the UK.

The song also reached No. 44 in New Zealand, and No. 84 in Germany.

=== Critical reception ===
Gene Armstrong from the Arizona Daily Star described the cover as "a hip-hop interpretation", "with heady strings striating the percolating reggae riddims." J. D. Considine from The Baltimore Sun felt it finds Hucknall "assuming the soulful reggae cadences" of "Night Nurse". Larry Flick from Billboard magazine wrote that he "presents a great rendition of Gregory Isaacs' gem [...], the first single from Sly & Robbie's latest set, Friends." He added, "Still steeped in Isaacs' vivid lyrical imagery (the track still plays like a classic love story that never made it to the screen), the song will be opened up to newer, younger audiences by Hucknall's pop influence. Dedicated Isaacs fans will also appreciate the authenticity Sly & Robbie impose on the track, as well as the various updated slants." Pan-European magazine Music & Media commented, "Although the production is very much a state of the art high tech job, they have managed to retain the rootsy feel that made the original so great in the first place."

=== Track listings ===
- UK/Europe CD1 single
1. "Night Nurse" (Radio Mix) - 3:54
2. "Night Nurse" (Dub with Vocal Mix) - 3:53
3. "Night Nurse" (Jah Wobble Radio Mix) - 3:46
4. "Night Nurse" (Jah Wobble 12" Mix) - 8:22
- UK CD2 single
1. "Night Nurse" (Sly and Robbie Radio Mix) - 3:53
2. "Night Nurse" (Sly and Robbie Dub Mix) - 3:53
3. "Night Nurse" (On-U Sound 12" Mix) - 4:57
4. "Night Nurse" (On-U Sound Dub the Patient Mix) - 4:56
5. "Night Nurse" (Groove Corporation Intellectual Beauty Mix) - 6:43
6. "Night Nurse" (Groove Corporation Zionic Man Mix) - 6:44
7. "Night Nurse" (Delano Dancehall Mix) - 4:42

=== Charts ===
Chart (1997)	Peak position
Europe (Eurochart Hot 100)	35
Germany (Official German Charts)	84
Italy (Musica e dischi)	23
New Zealand (Recorded Music NZ)	44
Scotland (OCC)	31
UK Singles (OCC)	13
