= Angel (Aretha Franklin song) =

1973 single by Aretha Franklin

Single by Aretha Franklin

from the album Hey Now Hey (The Other Side of the Sky)
- B-side: "Sister from Texas"
- Released: June 1973
- Studio: Record Plant (Los Angeles)
- Length: 3:34 (single version); 4:30 (album version)
- Label: Atlantic
- Songwriters: Carolyn Franklin; Sonny Sanders
- Producers: Quincy Jones; Aretha Franklin

Aretha Franklin singles chronology
"Master of Eyes (The Deepness of Your Eyes)" (1973)	"Angel" (1973)	"Until You Come Back to Me (That's What I'm Gonna Do)" (1973)

"Angel" is a song by American singer Aretha Franklin. The song was co-written by Aretha's sister, Carolyn, and Sonny Sanders. Aretha co-produced the song with Quincy Jones and it originally appeared on Franklin's 19th album, Hey Now Hey (The Other Side of the Sky) (1973). "Angel" was released as a single by Atlantic Records in June 1973 and went on to top the US Billboard Hot Soul Singles chart for two weeks while reaching number 20 on the Billboard Hot 100 chart.

== Personnel ==
- Lead and background vocals by Aretha Franklin
- Additional background vocals by Carolyn Franklin and Erma Franklin
- Produced and arranged by Quincy Jones and Aretha Franklin

== Charts ==
Chart (1973)	Peak position
Canada Top Singles (RPM)	47
UK Singles (OCC)	37
US Billboard Hot 100	20
US Adult Contemporary (Billboard)	44
US Hot Soul Singles (Billboard)	1

== Simply Red version ==
"Angel"

Single by Simply Red

from the album Greatest Hits
- B-side: "Money's Too Tight (to Mention)"
- Released: October 28, 1996
- Genre: Jeep-funk; soul
- Length: 4:01
- Label: EastWest
- Songwriters: Carolyn Franklin; Sonny Sanders
- Producers: Simply Red; Wyclef Jean; Pras; Jerry Duplessis

Simply Red singles chronology
"We're in This Together" (1996)	"Angel" (1996)	"Night Nurse" (1997)

Music video
- "Angel" on YouTube

British soul and pop band Simply Red covered "Angel" for their first compilation album, Greatest Hits (1996), featuring an uncredited appearance by American hip hop group Fugees. It was released on October 28, 1996, by EastWest Records, as the only single from the album and reached number four in the United Kingdom. The song also appeared on the Set It Off soundtrack. Simply Red performed it on TOTP, and with Fugees on the MTV Awards.

=== Critical reception ===
AllMusic editor Jon O'Brien wrote that the song is "a surprisingly passable attempt at hip-hop lite." Larry Flick from Billboard magazine described it as a "rugged jeep-funk cover" and commented further that "this is far more street-oriented than Simply Red's previous efforts, and front man Mick Hucknall is pushed to deliver one his roughest and most forceful performances to date." He also noted that the singer "sounds convincingly hard alongside Fugee Wyclef Jean's muscular guest rap". Ken Tucker from Entertainment Weekly noted Hucknall's "keening croon to the Fugees' smoky harmonies" and added that "this low-key pleaser exerts a romantic pull".

Kevin Courtney from Irish Times felt Fugees "put some street cool" into the cover. A reviewer from Music & Media wrote that Wyclef Jean and Pras Michel "bring out the best in Mick Hucknall on this hair-raising version", and "his voice can handle any soul ballad on its own, but the unmistakeble Fugees beats and soulful snippets make this a great addition to the Simply Red Greatest Hits album." Alan Jones from Music Week named it "a blinding remake" of the Aretha Franklin song.

=== Track listings ===
UK CD1 and Australian CD single
No.	Title	Length
1.	"Angel" (Simply Red mix)	4:00
2.	"Angel" (Mousse T soul mix)	4:06
3.	"Angel" (soundtrack version)	3:39
4.	"Angel" (Wondrous Angel dub)	3:59
5.	"Angel" (Rubbadubb mix)	4:06

UK CD2
No.	Title	Length
1.	"Angel" (Mousse T. smooth soul mix)	3:53
2.	"Angel" (Simply Red mix)	4:00
3.	"Angel" (recorded live at Montreux with Quincy Jones and His Big Band)	4:42
4.	"Money's Too Tight (to Mention)" (edited disco vocal)	4:56

UK 12-inch single
No.	Title	Length
1.	"Angel" (Mousse T. soul mix)	4:06
2.	"Angel" (Mousse T. soul instrumental)	4:18
3.	"Angel" (Rubbadubb mix)	4:06
4.	"Angel" (Mousse T. club mix)	6:04

UK cassette single and European CD single
No.	Title	Length
1.	"Angel" (Simply Red mix)	4:00
2.	"Angel" (Mousse T. soul mix)	4:06

US CD single
No.	Title	Length
1.	"Angel" (soundtrack version)	3:40
2.	"Money's Too Tight (to Mention)" (Simply Red remix)	4:56

US maxi-CD single
No.	Title	Length
1.	"Angel" (soundtrack version)	3:40
2.	"Angel" (Mousse T. soul mix)	4:08
3.	"Angel" (Mousse T. smooth soul mix)	3:54
4.	"Money's Too Tight (to Mention)" (Simply Red remix)	4:56
5.	"Angel" (Mousse T. club mix)	6:06

=== Charts ===
==== Weekly charts ====
Chart (1996–1997)	Peak position
Belgium (Ultratip Bubbling Under Flanders)	12
Canada Adult Contemporary (RPM)	57
Europe (Eurochart Hot 100)	33
Germany (GfK)	71
Ireland (IRMA)	23
Israel (Israeli Singles Chart)	21
Italy (Musica e dischi)	13
Italy Airplay (Music & Media)	2
New Zealand (Recorded Music NZ)	11
Scottish Singles Sales (Official Charts)	7
UK Singles (Official Charts)	4
UK Hip Hop/R&B (Official Charts)	1
UK Airplay (Music Week)	8
UK Pop Tip Club Chart (Music Week)	33

==== Year-end charts ====
Chart (1996)	Position
UK Singles (OCC)	93

=== Release history ===
Region	Date	Format(s)	Label(s)	Ref.
United States	October 22, 1996	Rhythmic contemporary; contemporary hit radio	EastWest	
United Kingdom	October 28, 1996	CD; cassette	EastWest	

== Other versions ==
- Kokomo – Kokomo (1975). Lead vocals sung by Paddie McHugh.
- Cassandra Wilson – She Who Weeps (1991)
- In 2012, Christine Anu covered the song on her album, Rewind: The Aretha Franklin Songbook.
- In 2019, Irish singer and former member of Westlife Brian McFadden recorded the song for his album Otis featuring Mica Paris.
