= It's Only Love Doing Its Thing =

1978 single by Barry White

Single by Barry White

from the album The Man
- A-side: "Your Sweetness Is My Weakness"
- Released: September 1978
- Recorded: 1978
- Genre: Soul, funk
- Length: 4:04
- Label: 20th Century
- Songwriters: Jimmie Cameron, Vella Cameron
- Producer: Barry White

Barry White singles chronology
"Just the Way You Are" (1978)	"It's Only Love Doing Its Thing" (1978)	"Any Fool Can See (You Were Meant for Me)" (1979)

"It's Only Love Doing Its Thing" is a song by soul singer Barry White, from his 1978 album The Man. It was released as the B-side to the album's lead single, "Your Sweetness Is My Weakness". The English soul band Simply Red covered the song in 1989, under the shortened title "It's Only Love".

Elements from the song were sampled in "21 Questions" by 50 Cent.

== Simply Red version ==
"It's Only Love"

Single by Simply Red

from the album A New Flame
- Released: January 16, 1989
- Recorded: 1988–1989
- Genre: Blue-eyed soul
- Length: 4:58
- Label: Elektra, WEA
- Songwriters: Jimmy Cameron, Vella Cameron
- Producer: Stewart Levine

Simply Red singles chronology
"I Won't Feel Bad" (1988)	"It's Only Love" (1989)	"If You Don't Know Me by Now" (1989)

Music video
- "It's Only Love" on YouTube

In 1989, the English soul and pop band Simply Red released a cover as "It's Only Love" as the lead single of their third studio album, A New Flame (1989). This version had its greatest success by charting at number-seven in Ireland. The song was later featured in Simply Red's several greatest-hits albums and a ballad collection of the same name.

=== Critical reception ===
Robin Smith from Record Mirror wrote, "Hell, sure has been a long time since we last heard Mick Hucknall crooning blissfully, but all good things are worth waiting for. 'It's Only Love' is a magnificent slow-burning track to cherish and savour, as Hucknall side-steps his vocals around some powerful instrumentation. It's nice to hear that Simply Red aren't merely regurgitating old ideas, and I can hardly wait for the album." William Shaw from Smash Hits said, "It's a low key re-entry into the giddy world of pop, none of Mick's over-the-top wailing, just a simple, catchy piece of their old fashioned "soul" that swings along in a most acceptable manner."

=== Personnel ===
- Fritz McIntyre – keyboards and backing vocals
- Tim Kellett – trumpet and keyboards
- Chris Joyce – drums
- Tony Bowers – bass guitar

=== Charts ===
==== Weekly charts ====
Chart (1989)	Peak position
Australia (ARIA)	31
Belgium (Ultratop 50 Flanders)	11
Canada Top Singles (RPM)	30
France (SNEP)	24
Ireland (IRMA)	7
Italy Airplay (Music & Media)	1
Netherlands (Dutch Top 40)	9
Netherlands (Single Top 100)	10
New Zealand (Recorded Music NZ)	31
Switzerland (Schweizer Hitparade)	12
UK Singles (Official Charts)	13
US Billboard Hot 100	57
US Adult Contemporary (Billboard)	19
West Germany (GfK)	21

==== Weekly charts ====
Year-end chart performance for "It's Only Love" by Simply Red
Chart (1989)	Position
Belgium (Ultratop)	97
West Germany (Media Control)	86
