= Say You Love Me (Simply Red song) =

Single by Simply Red

from the album Blue
- B-side: "So Jungiful"; "So Many People"; "Never Never Love"
- Released: 27 April 1998
- Studio: West Point Studios, London
- Genre: Pop
- Length: 3:44
- Label: EastWest
- Songwriter: Mick Hucknall
- Producer: AGM

Simply Red singles chronology
"Night Nurse" (1997)	"Say You Love Me" (1998)	"The Air That I Breathe" (1998)

Music video
- "Say You Love Me" on YouTube

"Say You Love Me" is a song by British soul and pop band Simply Red, released in April 1998, by EastWest Records, as the second single from their sixth album, Blue (1998). It is written by frontman Mick Hucknall and produced by AGM, the production team by Andy Wright, Gota Yashiki and Hucknall. The song was quite successful in Europe, peaking at number one in Estonia and Latvia, number four in Hungary and number seven on the UK Singles Chart. Additionally, it was a top-20 hit in Austria, Ireland, Italy and Scotland. On the Eurochart Hot 100, it reached number 24. The accompanying music video was directed by German director Marcus Nispel, and filmed in the US.

== Critical reception ==
Gene Armstrong from the Arizona Daily Star named the song a "languorous slow-dance number" and "sultry". Scottish newspaper Daily Record wrote, "Simply Red's latest ballad has all the makings of a summer classic. It's one of the best songs yet by Mick Hucknall, who says he has finally discovered he is a romantic at heart." Gus Bode from The Daily Egyptian noted that it "recall(s) vintage Simply Red tracks". Graham Clark from The Yorkshire Times called it "mellow and soulful".

== Track listing ==
- CD single, Benelux (1998)
1. "Say You Love Me" — 3:42
2. "So Jungiful" — 4:46
- CD single, UK & Europe (1998)
1. "Say You Love Me" — 3:44
2. "So Jungiful" — 4:46
3. "So Many People" (Live) — 5:42
4. "Never Never Love" (Live) — 4:35

== Charts ==
=== Weekly charts ===
Chart (1998)	Peak position
Austria (Ö3 Austria Top 40)	18
Belgium (Ultratop 50 Wallonia)	24
Estonia (Eesti Top 20)	1
Europe (Eurochart Hot 100)	24
Europe (European Hit Radio)	1
France (SNEP)	52
Germany (GfK)	49
Hungary (Mahasz)	4
Ireland (IRMA)	15
Italy (FIMI)	7
Italy Airplay (Music & Media)	1
Latvia (Latvijas Top 50)	1
Netherlands (Dutch Top 40 Tipparade)	16
Netherlands (Single Top 100)	71
Scotland (OCC)	19
UK Singles (OCC)	7

=== Year-end charts ===
Chart (1998)	Position
Brazil (Crowley)	57
Latvia (Latvijas Top 50)	17
UK Singles (OCC)	161
