= Ev'ry Time We Say Goodbye =

1944 show tune by Cole Porter

- by Cole Porter
- Genre: Jazz
- Published: Chappell & Company, 1944

Premiere
- Date: 1944
- Performers: Nan Wynn and Jere McMahon

"Ev'ry Time We Say Goodbye" is a popular jazz song with lyrics and music by Cole Porter. Part of the Great American Songbook, it was published by Chappell & Company and introduced by Nan Wynn and Jere McMahon in 1944 in Billy Rose's musical revue Seven Lively Arts.

The lyrics celebrate how happy the singer is in the company of the beloved, but suffering equally whenever the two separate. Describing it by analogy as a musical "change from major to minor", Porter begins with an A♭ major chord and ends with an A♭ minor chord, matching the mood of the music to the words.

The Benny Goodman Quintet (vocal by Peggy Mann) enjoyed a hit record with the song in 1945.

== Other notable recordings ==
Musician	Album	Year	Source
Teddy Wilson with Maxine Sullivan		1945	
Ella Fitzgerald	Ella Fitzgerald Sings the Cole Porter Song Book	1956	
Ray Charles & Betty Carter	Ray Charles and Betty Carter	1961	
Sarah Vaughan	After Hours	1961	
John Coltrane	My Favorite Things	1961	
The Hi-Lo's	Now	1981	
Annie Lennox	Red Hot + Blue	1990	
Carly Simon	Film Noir	1997	
Bob Florence with Annette Sanders	You Will Be My Music	2007	
Laufey	A Night at the Symphony	2023	
