= Money's Too Tight (to Mention) =

1982 single by the Valentine Brothers

Single by the Valentine Brothers

from the album First Take
- Released: 1982
- Genre: R&B
- Length: 5:52
- Label: Bridge
- Songwriters: John Valentine, William Valentine

The Valentine Brothers singles chronology
"Let Me Be Close to You" (1982)	"Money's Too Tight (to Mention)" (1982)	"Lonely Nights" (1984)

"Money's Too Tight (to Mention)"
- UK 7-inch vinyl single

Single by Simply Red

from the album Picture Book
- B-side: "(Open Up the) Red Box"
- Released: May 20, 1985
- Genre: Blue-eyed soul
- Length: 4:13
- Label: Elektra
- Songwriters: John Valentine, William Valentine
- Producer: Stewart Levine

Simply Red singles chronology
"Money's Too Tight (to Mention)" (1985)	"Come to My Aid" (1985)

Music video
- "Simply Red - Money's Too Tight (To Mention) (Official Video)" on YouTube

"Money's Too Tight (to Mention)" (sometimes stylized as "Money$ Too Tight (to Mention)" in some of its single and album releases) is a song written and first recorded by American recording group the Valentine Brothers. It was released as a single in 1982. Their version peaked at number 41 on the Billboard Hot Black Singles chart. The song was ranked at number six among the top 10 "Tracks of the Year" for 1982 by NME.

"Money's Too Tight (to Mention)" was covered by British pop and soul group Simply Red in 1985 as their debut single. The single went to number 13 on the UK Singles Chart in July 1985 and number 28 on the US Billboard Hot 100 chart in 1986. The song was also an international hit, reaching the top 40 in several countries.

The lyrics concern a person with economic problems, and mention Reaganomics, a set of economic policies implemented by U.S. president Ronald Reagan in order to encourage the growth of the American economy. The lyrics include the lines "the old man that's over the hill", and "did the earth move for you, Nancy?" He wants to borrow money, first from his brother who responds,"Brother I'd like to help you but I'm unable to", then to his "Father, Father, almighty Father" who then responds "Money's too tight to mention".

== Track listings ==
- 7-inch single
1. Money's Too Tight (To Mention) 3:38
2. (Open Up the) Red Box 3:55
- 12-inch single
1. Money's Too Tight (To Mention) (The Cutback Mix) 8:40
2. Money's Too Tight (To Mention) (Single Version) 3:38
3. Money's Too Tight (To Mention) (Dub Version) 6:43

== Charts ==
=== The Valentine Brothers version ===
Chart (1982)	Peak position
UK Singles (Official Charts)	73
US Hot R&B/Hip-Hop Songs (Billboard)	41

=== Simply Red version ===
Chart (1985–1986)	Peak position
Australia (Kent Music Report)	21
Belgium (Ultratop 50 Flanders)	41
Canada Top Singles (RPM)	51
Europe (European Hot 100 Singles)	42
Finland (Suomen virallinen lista)	14
France (SNEP)	29
Ireland (IRMA)	9
Netherlands (Dutch Top 40)	24
Netherlands (Single Top 100)	22
New Zealand (Recorded Music NZ)	8
UK Singles (Official Charts)	13
US Billboard Hot 100	28
US 12-inch Singles Sales (Billboard)	31
US Dance/Disco Club Play (Billboard)	2

== See also ==
- Ronald Reagan in music
