= Fritz McIntyre =

British musician (1958–2021)

- Born: Fritz Gerald McIntyre; 2 September 1958; Birmingham, England
- Died: 23 August 2021 (aged 62)
- Genres: Pop, soul, post-punk, CCM
- Occupations: Singer, musician
- Instruments: Vocals, keyboards
- Years active: 1985–2021
- Website: Simply Red Official Site

Fritz Gerald McIntyre (2 September 1958 – 23 August 2021) was a British musician, most famous for his tenure as keyboard player in the original line-up of Simply Red.

== Early life ==
McIntyre was born in Birmingham in 1958. His father was not only a church pastor, but also a choirmaster and gifted musician. As a boy he learnt a lot about music through him, and also learned trumpet and double bass at school, to accompany his self-taught skills in piano and guitar. The family moved to Canada, although McIntyre returned to Manchester in his twenties, hoping for a career in music.

== Career ==
McIntyre successfully auditioned for Simply Red in 1984. He co-wrote several of Simply Red's songs with frontman Mick Hucknall and sang background vocals. He also sang the lead vocals in the song "Wonderland" from the Stars album. He was a founder member of the band, and played from their debut album Picture Book in 1985 until their 1995 album Life. He was the last of the founder members to quit the band, though with their growing success, he saw decisions being made on the "big bucks" rather than "artistic progress and merit". The former camaraderie had gone, and so he decided he'd had enough.

After leaving Simply Red, McIntyre released an eponymous debut solo album. He then moved to Ontario, Canada where he released a Christian worship album First Fruits. He later resided in the United States where he was the music director of a large Florida church.

McIntyre died on 23 August 2021, at the age of 62.
