= Holding Back the Years =

1985 single by Simply Red

- 1986 reissued UK 7-inch vinyl single

Single by Simply Red

from the album Picture Book
- B-side: "I Won't Feel Bad"; "Drowning in My Own Tears" (re-issue)
- Released: 4 November 1985
- Genre: Sophisti-pop; soft rock; blue-eyed soul
- Length: 4:28 (album version); 4:04 (single version)
- Label: Elektra; WEA
- Songwriters: Mick Hucknall; Neil Moss
- Producer: Stewart Levine

Simply Red singles chronology
"Come to My Aid" (1985)	"Holding Back the Years" (1985)	"Jericho" (1986)
"Jericho" (1986)	"Holding Back the Years" (re-release) (1986)	"Open Up the Red Box" (1986)

Music video
- "Holding Back the Years" on YouTube

"Holding Back the Years" is a song by the English soul and pop band Simply Red, released as the third single from their debut studio album, Picture Book (1985). In 1986, the ballad reached number one on the US Billboard Hot 100 and number two on the UK Singles Chart. "Holding Back the Years" had initially been released in the UK the year before, reaching number 51. The song was nominated in the category of Best Pop Performance by a Duo or Group with Vocals at the 29th Annual Grammy Awards.

== Background ==
The group's frontman Mick Hucknall wrote the song when he was 17, while living at his father's house. In a 2018 interview, Hucknall said the song was inspired by a member of the teaching staff at Manchester School of Art, where Hucknall was a fine-art student: the lecturer suggested the greatest paintings are produced when the artist is working in a stream of consciousness, which Hucknall then tried to apply to songwriting – "Holding Back the Years" was the second song he wrote using this method.

The song's writing credits are shared between Hucknall and Neil Moss, a friend and member of Hucknall's first group, the Frantic Elevators. According to Hucknall, Moss did not co-write the song, but the credit was added "to remember the great times we had" as the pair had written so many other songs together. The song was first performed by the Frantic Elevators. The song's "I'll keep holding on" chorus was not added until many years later, after the band had split and Hucknall had formed Simply Red.

Hucknall's mother left the family when he was three: the upheaval caused by this event inspired him to write the song. According to Hucknall, he did not realise what the song was about until it was finished: he characterised it as a song "about that moment where you know you have to leave home and make your mark, but the outside world is scary. So you’re holding back the years". He said that the line "strangled by the wishes of pater" was inspired by arguments he had with his father: according to Hucknall, the two clashed often during his teenage years "because there was no woman to act as referee".

== Music video ==
The accompanying music video for "Holding Back the Years" focuses on Mick Hucknall, who, while singing the song, walks through the English countryside and Whitby Abbey carrying luggage and thinking about his childhood memories and the difficult relationship he had with his father. The other members of Simply Red (except for Fritz McIntyre, who plays a one-man band) play local cricketers who greet Hucknall as he passes by and later watch him on the Whitby 199 steps. In the last part of the song, Hucknall is seen travelling on a train, the scenes for which were filmed at and around Goathland railway station on the North Yorkshire Moors Railway.

== Track listings ==
Standard 7-inch single

A. "Holding Back the Years"
B. "I Won't Feel Bad"

UK 7-inch single (1986)

A. "Holding Back the Years"
B. "Drowning in My Tears"

Standard 12-inch single

A1. "Holding Back the Years"
B1. "I Won't Feel Bad"
B2. "Drowning in My Tears"

UK and Canadian 12-inch single (1986)

A1. "Holding Back the Years"
B1. "Drowning in My Tears"
B2. "Picture Book in Dub"

== Charts ==
=== Weekly charts ===
Chart (1986)	Peak position
Australia (Kent Music Report)	16
Austria (Ö3 Austria Top 40)	22
Belgium (Ultratop 50 Flanders)	8
Canada Top Singles (RPM)	6
Canada Adult Contemporary (RPM)	1
Europe (European Hot 100 Singles)	33
Finland (Suomen virallinen lista)	26
Ireland (IRMA)	1
Netherlands (Dutch Top 40)	3
Netherlands (Single Top 100)	5
New Zealand (Recorded Music NZ)	40
UK Singles (Official Charts)	2
US Billboard Hot 100	1
US Adult Contemporary (Billboard)	4
US Hot Black Singles (Billboard)	29
US Cash Box Top 100	4

Chart (2006)	Peak position
US Smooth Jazz Songs (Billboard)	13

=== Year-end charts ===
Chart (1986)	Position
Australia (Kent Music Report)	89
Belgium (Ultratop)	76
Canada Top Singles (RPM)	50
Netherlands (Dutch Top 40)	50
UK Singles (OCC)	33
US Billboard Hot 100	22

== Certifications ==
Region	Certification	Certified units/sales
New Zealand (RMNZ)	Platinum	30,000^{‡}
United Kingdom (BPI)	Gold	400,000^{‡}
^{‡} Sales+streaming figures based on certification alone.

== Another Level version ==
"Holding Back the Years"

Single by Another Level
- A-side: "Be Alone No More" (remix); (double A-side)
- Released: 1999
- Genre: R&B
- Length: 4:18
- Label: Northwestside
- Songwriters: Mick Hucknall; Neil Moss
- Producer: D'Influence

Another Level singles chronology
"I Want You for Myself" (1999)	"Be Alone No More (Remix)" / "Holding Back the Years" (1999)	"From the Heart" (1999)

In 1999, English R&B boy band Another Level released their version as a double A-side with a remix of their earlier hit, "Be Alone No More". This release reached No. 11 on the UK Singles Chart.

=== Track listings ===
- UK CD1 single
1. "Be Alone No More" (C & J remix) (featuring Jay-Z) – 3:31
2. "Holding Back the Years" – 4:18
3. "Girl What You Wanna Do" (full length version) – 5:27
- UK CD2 single
1. "Holding Back the Years" (radio edit) – 4:18
2. "Be Alone No More" (Full Intention radio edit) – 3:41
3. "Be Alone No More" (C & J remix) – 3:31
