= Stewart Levine =

American record producer (born 1946)

Stewart Levine (born 1946) is an American record producer.

The artists he has worked with include The Crusaders, Minnie Riperton, Lionel Richie, Simply Red, Hugh Masekela, Huey Lewis and the News, Patti LaBelle, Sly Stone, Boy George, Oleta Adams, Killing Joke, Jon Anderson and Curiosity Killed the Cat.

== Career ==
Levine left the Manhattan School of Music after one year to pursue a career as a horn player and arranger. He developed his skills as an arranger on pop and R&B recordings. This experience led Levine into forming a production company with Hugh Masekela. They produced records that were a hybrid of South African township grooves crossed with rhythm and blues and jazz. They left New York and moved to Los Angeles to form Chisa Records, an independent label. Levine produced Masekela's "Grazing in the Grass".

While in California, Levine met members of The Jazz Crusaders. Levine signed them to Chisa Records with the idea of combining the funk of their native Texas alongside the jazz for which they were known. This was the beginning of a style that would become known as jazz-funk and, later, "Rare Groove". Levine produced over a dozen albums with The Crusaders.

In 1974, Levine put together a music festival Zaire 74 in Kinshasa, set around The Rumble in the Jungle boxing match, the Ali/Foreman fight in Zaire. He produced the festival. The event was filmed and eventually released in 1996 as the documentary When We Were Kings.

Levine returned to recording, producing Minnie Riperton's third album, Adventures in Paradise. This led to a productive period in which he produced albums by Van Morrison, Lamont Dozier's Peddlin' Music on the Side, which featured the song "Goin' Back to My Roots" and the début album of Randy Crawford. Levine developed a close relationship with Phil Walden and Capricorn Records, producing a series of albums with southern rock artists The Marshall Tucker Band, as well as The Allman Bros.

Levine produced the first of six albums with B.B. King. Midnight Believer was a hit, putting B.B. King back on the charts with a gold album after a long absence. This was followed by King's Grammy winning There Must Be a Better World Somewhere.

In 1982 Levine produced "Up Where We Belong" with Joe Cocker and Jennifer Warnes. Used as the end title song to the film An Officer and a Gentleman, "Up Where We Belong" became a #1 pop hit, Grammy winner and Academy Award winner. He then produced Sly and the Family Stone's second album for Warner Bros. Records. Next came Womack & Womack's debut Love Wars. In the United Kingdom it became a #1 album. Due to the success of this album, Levine moved to London and began working with a wide range of acts including the bands Blancmange and Killing Joke.

Levine was invited by an A&R man to see a new band from Manchester named Simply Red play their first gig in London. He describes the moment: "The lead singer was magical but the music sounded like a retro American soul revue. I met with Mick Hucknall and told him that we needed to come up with something fresh, not just revisit the past."

The result was Simply Red's début album Picture Book, which became a huge hit in both the UK and the United States. Propelled by the international #1 single, "Holding Back the Years", it sold over seven million copies worldwide. Levine produced six tracks on Curiosity Killed the Cat's Keep Your Distance in a similar "soul" style. It contained two top ten singles and became a #1 album in the UK and Europe. He followed this with Boy George's first solo album, Sold, containing the reggae influenced #1 hit single "Everything I Own".

Next came Simply Red's A New Flame, which included the international #1 version of "If You Don't Know Me by Now". In 1991 Levine produced Simply Red's Stars, which became one of the largest selling albums in British history. Stars contained four UK hit singles, sold 3.5 million copies in the UK and over eleven million copies worldwide.

Levine produced three new songs for Lionel Richie's greatest hits album Back to Front. He then produced Dr. John's album Goin' Back to New Orleans, as well as albums for Huey Lewis and The News, Oleta Adams and Ireland's Hot House Flowers. Levine returned to England to produce Simply Red's next album, Life, which included the group's only UK #1 single, "Fairground".

After this album, Levine decided to take a break from the studio to concentrate on composing and playing the saxophone. He returned in 2002, producing a reunion album with The Crusaders. This was followed by another reunion with Simply Red. Levine produced their hit version of "You Make Me Feel Brand New", as well as their single "Sunrise". Next came David Sanborn's first new album in many years, Time Again.

In the summer of 2003 Levine was asked to work with young British jazz artist Jamie Cullum. Levine produced Cullum's debut album Twenty Something. Levine followed this by producing the Dr. John's N'Awlinz: Dis, Dat or D'udda, which featured New Orleans musicians alongside guests such as B.B. King and Randy Newman. Levine returned to the UK to produce Jamie Cullum's second album Catching Tales.

In 2024, Levine produced Aaron Neville's début for Sony-BMG, The Soul Classics, a collection of R&B songs.

== Other sources ==
- "Producer Stewart Levine recalls the landmark festival immortalised in Soul Power". The Guardian. 20 June 2009.
- "'Zaire 74' legendary African music festival remembered". The Independent. 21 February 2010.
