= Mick Hucknall =

English singer and songwriter (born 1960)

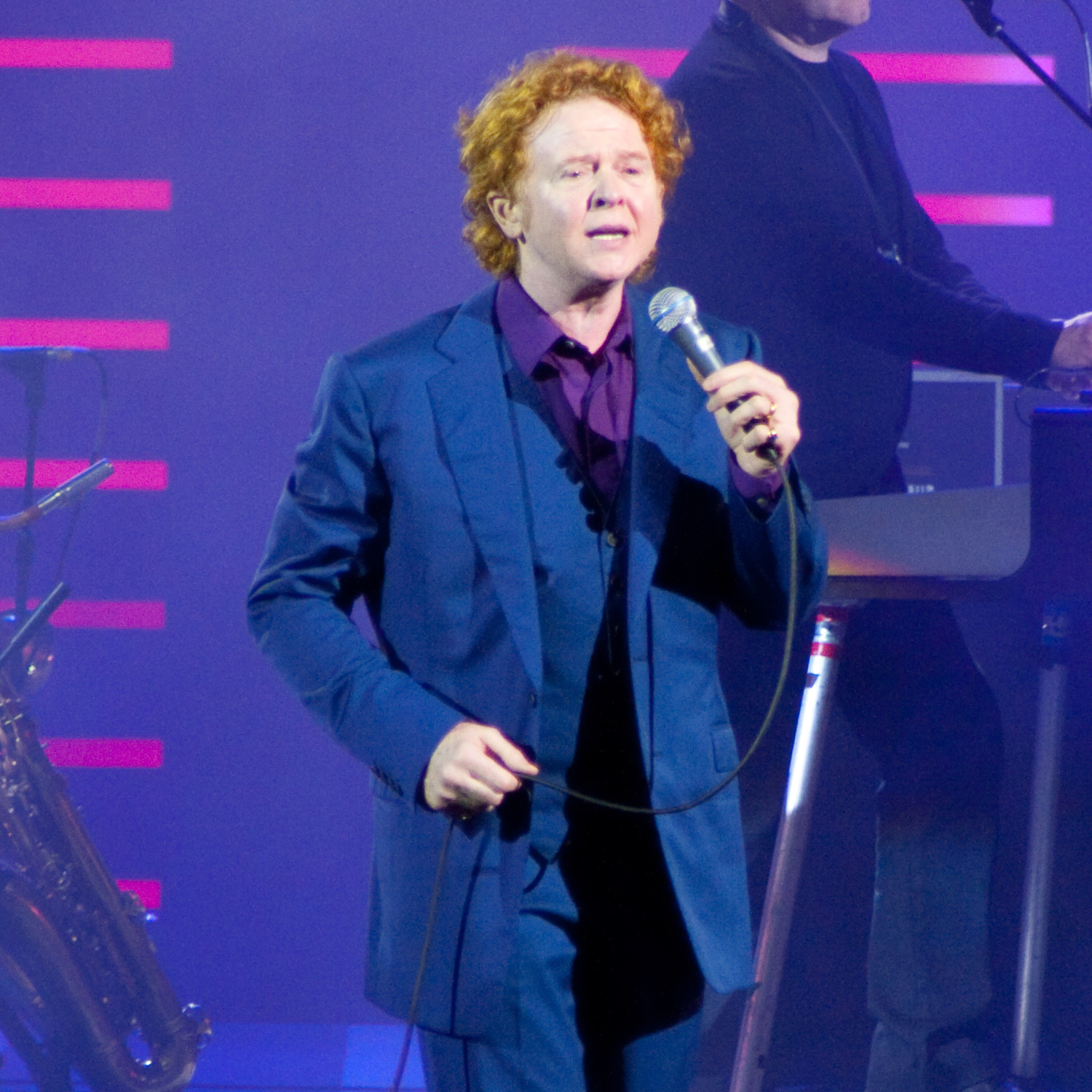
- Hucknall performing in 2009

Background information
- Born: Michael James Hucknall; 8 June 1960 (age 66); Manchester, England
- Genres: Pop; R&B; blue-eyed soul
- Occupations: Singer; songwriter
- Instruments: Vocals; guitar; bass; piano
- Years active: 1979–present
- Labels: Elektra; East West; Simplyred.com
- Member of: Simply Red
- Formerly of: Frantic Elevators
- Spouse: Gabriella Wesberry (m. 2010)
- Website: simplyred.com

Michael James Hucknall (born 8 June 1960) is an English singer and songwriter. Hucknall achieved international fame in the 1980s as the lead singer and songwriter of the soul-influenced pop band Simply Red, with whom he had a 25-year career and sold over 50 million albums. He also served as a vocalist for Faces in the early 2010s. Hucknall was described by the Australian Rhythms Magazine as "one of the truly great blue-eyed soul singers", while Q credited him with "the most prodigious voice this side of Motown".

== Early life ==
Hucknall, born at Saint Mary's Hospital, Manchester, on 8 June 1960, was an only child. His mother abandoned the family when he was three; the upheaval caused by this event inspired him to write "Holding Back the Years", which would become one of Simply Red's biggest and best-known hits. He was brought up in Denton by his father, Reginald (1935–2009), a barber in Stockport. According to Hucknall he had a happy childhood until the age of 10, when he began to clash with his father "because there was no woman to act as referee".

Hucknall attended Audenshaw School, before continuing his education at Tameside College and Manchester Polytechnic's School of Art, where he was a fine art student: whilst at art school he lived in Hulme, including a period living in the Hulme Crescents estate, where crime was so common that Hucknall slept with an axe by his bed for protection. It would not be until the mid-1990s that he would reconnect with his mother, Maureen, who was by then living in Dallas, Texas. As of a 2008 interview, he had only seen her twice since she left. His mother stated in a 2021 interview that she still had "absolutely no regrets" about leaving him and his father when he was three. He is of Irish ancestry from his mother, whose father was from County Offaly, along with his paternal grandmother. His maternal grandmother was Jewish.

== Music career ==
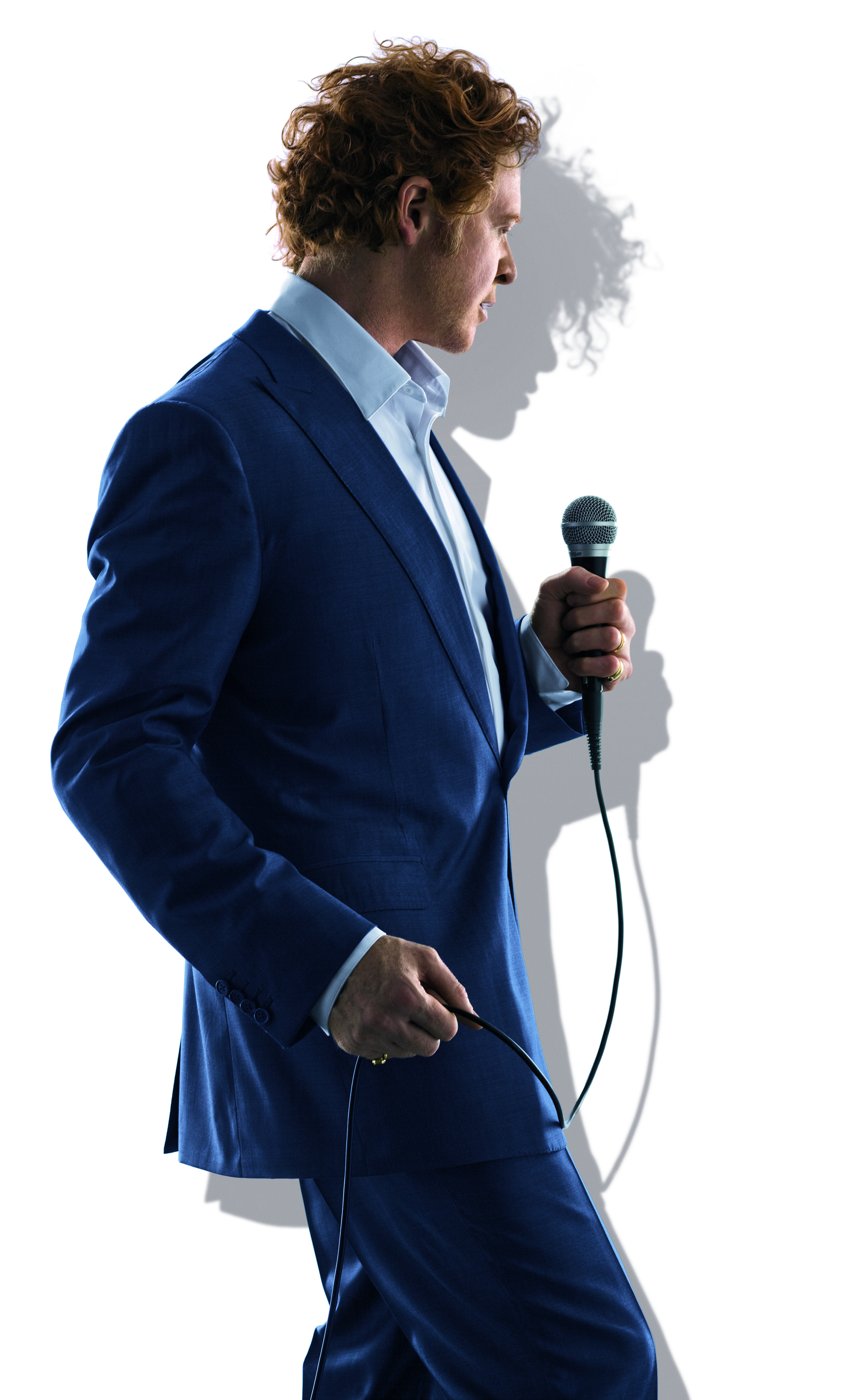
Hucknall in 2010

Hucknall was among the people present at the Sex Pistols' Lesser Free Trade Hall performance on 4 June 1976. His interest in the music scene led to the launch of his career in the late 1970s, when he was part of the band Frantic Elevators. The Frantic Elevators released four singles, including a version of "Holding Back the Years", which he later recorded with Simply Red.

As lead singer and core member of Simply Red, he became the identifiable face of the band. His face and long curly red hair were featured prominently on album artwork and in videos.

In 1997, Hucknall won an Outstanding Achievement award from the Music of Black Origin Awards (MOBO Awards) despite being white.

Hucknall is one of the founders of the reggae label Blood and Fire.

In October 2007, on David Jensen's show on the Gold network, he announced Simply Red would split in 2009. In 2008, he released his first solo album Tribute to Bobby, a tribute to the blues musician Bobby "Blue" Bland.

In October 2009, Hucknall appeared at a charity performance as vocalist for a re-formed version of Faces, replacing Rod Stewart. In October 2011, he was awarded with a BASCA Gold Badge award in recognition of his contribution to music.

In October 2012, he released American Soul, a collection of his favourite music re-recorded with his vocals.

== Political activism and views ==
Hucknall was active in politics as a prominent celebrity supporter of the Labour Party during the New Labour era. In 1997, he declared his support for the party at that year's general election – which it won by a landslide under the leadership of Tony Blair to return to government after 18 years in opposition. In 1998, Hucknall was named in a list of those who donated more than £5,000 to the party. In 2003, Hucknall backed Blair's stance on the Iraq War, stating he had "more respect for Blair than ever" and pointed out that British critics of the war were lucky to be living in a country where they could express their opinions. Hucknall said in 2008 that his conscience prevented him from donating to the party again because of the war, although he would still vote for them.

Hucknall has been strongly critical of more recent Labour leaders: after the 2015 general election, he said that Ed Miliband "veer(ed) close to Marxism" and that the electorate had acted "with collective wisdom" by defeating Labour in favour of electing a Conservative government, which he described as "the inheritor of the Blairite mantle". The following year he described Jeremy Corbyn as a "shabby, spineless coward" for what he regarded as an insufficiently strong commitment to the Remain campaign for the 2016 Brexit referendum. Hucknall publicly declared he would not vote for Labour ahead of the 2017 general election and 2019 general election, and that he had ended his longstanding support for the party, citing Corbyn's stance on antisemitism. In 2019, he described himself as "politically homeless."

Hucknall has said that derogatory references to his red hair are a form of bigotry.

Hucknall was a guest on the panel for the BBC's political discussion series Question Time, broadcast on 27 March 2014, and declared his support for same-sex marriage.

== Personal life ==
Hucknall and his wife Gabriella Wesberry married in 2010 at the 16th-century Forter Castle in Glenisla, Perthshire, Scotland. Their daughter Romy True Hucknall was born in June 2007.

Hucknall spends a considerable amount of time in Ireland, where he purchased the Glenmore Estate near the village of Cloghan, County Donegal, with bandmate Chris De Margary. Hucknall and De Margary are keen fishermen. They operate a fishing and hunting tourism business from the estate. In March 2014, Hucknall settled a hunting and fishing rights lawsuit, ongoing for five years, with a neighbour in Ireland. As the case opened in 2009, Judge O'Hagan had instructed both sides to go away and talk about reaching an agreement or else it would drag on for years.

Hucknall co-owns Ask Property Development, a company that constructs city squares and public buildings.

Hucknall spends time in Catania, Sicily, where he produces wines under the label "Il Cantante" (The Singer).

=== Football ===
Hucknall is a football fan and a supporter of Manchester United. His song "We're in This Together" was the competition anthem of the 1996 UEFA European Football Championship and he performed it at its opening and closing ceremonies.

== Solo discography ==
=== Albums ===
Year	Album	Chart positions						Certifications
Year	Album	UK	AUT	GER	IT	NL	SWI	Certifications
2008	Tribute to Bobby: Released: 19 May 2008	18	39	37	25	23	29	
2012	American Soul: Released: 29 October 2012	6	11	12	22	15	18	Gold (BPI)

=== Singles ===
Year	Single	Peak chart positions	Album
Year	Single	UK	Album
2008	"Poverty"	—	Tribute to Bobby
2008	"Farther Up the Road"	—	Tribute to Bobby
2011	"Happy This Christmas"	—	Non-album single
2012	"That's How Strong My Love Is"	118	American Soul

=== Other appearances ===
In 1986, he provided backup vocals for the musical film Little Shop of Horrors.

Year	Song	Album
1999	"Ain't That a Lot of Love"	Reload (with Simply Red and Tom Jones)
2002	"T-Bone Shuffle"	Jools Holland's Big Band Rhythm & Blues
2012	"I Got It Bad (And That Ain't Good)"	Jools Holland & His Rhythm & Blues Orchestra – The Golden Age Of Song

Year	Song	Album
1997	"Someday in my Life"	Leggera (Mina)
2012	"One of Us Must Know (Sooner or Later)"	Chimes of Freedom: The Songs of Bob Dylan Honoring 50 Years of Amnesty International
2015	"Streets of Arklow"	Duets: Re-Working The Catalogue (Van Morrison)

== See also ==
- List of celebrities who own wineries and vineyards
