= Flying saucer (disambiguation) =

A flying saucer is an unidentified flying object (UFO) that is saucer-shaped. The term may also generally refer to any UFO.

Flying saucer(s) may also refer to:

== Arts, entertainment, media ==
=== Albums ===
- Flyin' Saucers Rock and Roll, record by Billy Lee Riley (1957)
- Flying Saucer Blues, Peter Case album (2000)
- Flying Saucer Tour Vol. 1, comedy album by Bill Hicks (2002)
- "Presidential Interview (Flying Saucer '64)", Dickie Goodman record (1964)
- "The Flying Saucer Goes West", Dickie Goodman record (1958)

=== Books ===
- The Flying Saucers Are Real, by Donald Keyhoe (1950)
- Flying Saucers from Outer Space, by Donald Keyhoe (1953)
- The Flying Saucer Mystery, Nancy Drew (1980)
- Military flying saucers, about a number of aircraft that have been proposed over the years

=== Films ===
- The Flying Saucer, science fiction by Mikel Conrad (1950)
- Earth vs. the Flying Saucers, science fiction by Fred Sears (1956)
- Flying Saucer Daffy, Three Stooges (1958)
- Flying Saucer Rock'n'Roll, science fiction spoof (1997)
- Summer of the Flying Saucer, Irish family film (2008)

=== Magazines ===
- Flying Saucers (magazine)

=== Songs ===
- "The Flying Saucer" (song), Buchanan and Goodman record (1956)
- "Flying Saucer Dudes", song by Béla Fleck and the Flecktones (1991)

=== TV episodes ===
- "The Flying Saucer", The Beverly Hillbillies
- "The Flying Saucer", Maude
- "Flying Sauces", Home Improvement
- "The Joker's Flying Saucer", Batman

=== Video games ===
- KULT: The Temple of Flying Saucers, Exxos game (1989)

== Groups, organizations ==
- The Crew of the Flying Saucer, Mike Watt band
- Flying Saucer Attack, David Pearce band from Bristol, England, UK

== People and characters ==
- Fatman the Human Flying Saucer, comic book superhero (1960s)

== Places ==
- Flying Saucer (protoplanetary disk), a disk around a young star located in the Rho Ophiuchi cloud complex
- Flying Saucers (attraction), Disneyland, Anaheim, California, USA (1961-1966)
- The Flying Saucer, Sharjah, UAE; a Brutalist building restored as a community art space

== Transportation and vehicular ==
- Saucer sled, a saucer shaped toy sled for winter recreation
- Kissinger-Crookes Flying Saucer, homebuilt glider (1958)

=== Spacecraft ===
- British Rail flying saucer, proposed by Charles Osmond Frederick
- Flying Saucer Working Party, UK Ministry of Defence study
- Nazi flying saucers, various stories or claims
- Ralph Horton flying saucer crash, Ralph Horton's farm, Fulton County, Georgia (1952)

== Other ==
- Flying saucer (confectionery), sherbet-filled confectionery
- Flying Saucer (library), a Java programming library

== See also ==
- Frisbee
- Flying disc
- Flying Flapjack
- Flying Pancake
- Saucer
- UFO (disambiguation)
- Unidentified flying object (disambiguation)
