= Alien =

Alien most commonly refers to:

- Extraterrestrial life, or alien life which does not originate from Earth
  - Extraterrestrial intelligence, hypothetical advanced alien life
  - Fictional alien life-forms, extraterrestrials in fiction
- Alien (law), a person in a country who is not a national of that country

Alien(s) or The Alien(s) may also refer to:

== Arts and entertainment ==
=== Films ===
- Alien (film), 1979, by Ridley Scott
  - Aliens (film), second film in the franchise from 1986 by James Cameron
  - Alien 3, third film in the franchise from 1992 by David Fincher
  - Alien Resurrection, fourth film in the franchise from 1997 by Jean-Pierre Jeunet
  - Alien vs. Predator (film), fifth film in the franchise from 2004 by Paul W. S. Anderson
  - Aliens vs. Predator: Requiem, sixth film in the franchise from 2007 by the Brothers Strause
  - Alien: Covenant, eighth film in the franchise from 2017 by Ridley Scott
  - Alien: Romulus, ninth film in the franchise from 2024 by Fede Álvarez
- Alien 2: On Earth, a 1980 unofficial sequel of the 1979 Alien film
- Alien Visitor (also titled Epsilon) (1995 film) Australian–Italian science fiction film by Rolf de Heer
- Alienoid, a 2022 South Korean film
- The Alien (2016 film), a 2016 Mexican film
- The Alien (unproduced film), an incomplete 1960s Indian–American film

=== Literature ===
- Fictional alien life-forms, extraterrestrials in fiction

==== Novels ====
- Alien novels, an extension of the Alien franchise
- Aliens: Colonial Marines Technical Manual, a 1995 book by Lee Brimmicombe-Wood, a guide to the fictional United States Colonial Marines
- Aliens (Tappan Wright novel), 1902, by Mary Tappan Wright
- Aliens!, a 1980 anthology of science fiction edited by Gardner Dozois and Jack Dann
- The Alien (novel), the eighth book in the Animorphs series by Katherine Applegate

==== Plays ====
- The Aliens (play), 2010, by Annie Baker

=== Music ===
==== Albums ====
- Alien (Alien album), 1988
- Alien (Beam album), 2022
- Alien (Northlane album), 2019
- Alien (Strapping Young Lad album), 2005
- Alien (soundtrack), 1979
- Alien, a 1989 EP by Tankard
- Aliens (soundtrack), 1987

==== Performers ====
- Alien (band), a 1980s Swedish rock group
- The Aliens (Australian band), a 1970s new wave group
- The Aliens, the backing band for the American musician Jared Louche on his 1999 solo debut album Covergirl
- The Aliens (Scottish band), a 2005–2008 rock group

==== Songs ====
- "Alien", by Atlanta Rhythm from Quinella, 1981
- "Alien", by Beach House, 2018
- "Alien" (Jonas Blue and Sabrina Carpenter song), 2018
- "Alien" (Britney Spears song), 2013
- "Aliens" by BTS from Arirang, 2026
- "Alien", by Bush from Sixteen Stone, 1994
- "Alien", by Dead Letter Circus from Dead Letter Circus, 2007
- "Alien", by The Devil Wears Prada from Space, 2014
- "Alien", by Erasure from Loveboat, 2000
- "Alien", by Japan from Quiet Life, 1979
- "Alien", by Lamb from Fear of Fours, 1999
- "Alien", by Lee Su-hyun, 2020
- "Alien", by Dennis Lloyd, 2020
- "Alien", by the National from First Two Pages of Frankenstein, 2023
- "Alien", by Nerina Pallot from Dear Frustrated Superstar, 2001
- "Alien", by P-Model from Landsale, 1980
- "Alien", by Pennywise from Straight Ahead, 1999
- "Alien", by Stray Kids from SKZ-Replay, 2022
- "Alien", by Structures from Life Through a Window, 2014
- "Alien", by Third Day from Conspiracy No. 5, 1997
- "Alien", by Thriving Ivory from Thriving Ivory, 2003
- "Alien", by Tokio Hotel from Humanoid, 2009
- "Aliens" (song), by Coldplay, 2017
- "Aliens", by Warlord, 1984
- "The Alien", by Dream Theater from A View from the Top of the World, 2021

=== Other uses in arts and entertainment ===
- Alien (franchise), a media franchise
  - Xenomorph, the titular alien in the franchise

==== Based on the 1979 and 1986 films ====
- Alien (1982 video game), a 1982 maze game based on the 1979 film
- Alien (1984 video game), based on the 1979 film
- Alien: Isolation, a 2014 video game based on the Alien science fiction horror film series
- Aliens (1990 video game), a game by Konami, based on the 1986 film
- Aliens: The Computer Game (UK Version), a 1986 game by Electric Dreams based on the 1986 film
- Aliens: The Computer Game (US Version), a 1986 game by Activision based on the 1986 film of the same name

==== Other video games ====
- Aliens (1982 video game), a text-only clone of Space Invaders written for the CP/M operating system on the Kaypro computer

=== Other media ===
- Alien (Armenian TV series), a 2017 melodrama series
- Alien: Isolation – The Digital Series, web series in the Alien franchise from 2019 by Fabien Dubois
- Alien: Earth, a science fiction horror television series in the franchise by Noah Hawley
- Alien (sculpture), a 2012 work by David Breuer-Weil, in Mottisfont, Hampshire, England
- Aliens (Dark Horse Comics line)
- "Aliens" (Roseanne), a 1992 television episode
- "The Alien" (Auf Wiedersehen, Pet), a 1984 television episode
- The Aliens (TV series), 2016 British sci-fi television series
- Aliens (Star Trek Roleplaying Game), published 2003

== Botany ==
- Alien species, adventive or introduced species; a species not native to its environment
  - Adventive plants or alien plants, species that are foreign to the native flora

== Science and technology ==
- AliEn (ALICE Environment), a grid framework
- Alien (file converter), a Linux program
- Alien Technology, a manufacturer of RFID technology

== Other uses ==
- Enemy alien, a person in a country who is not a national of that country specifically during a time of war
- Alien UFO technologies, speculative hypothesis that some UFOs are alien spacecraft
- Alien (shipping company), a Russian company
- Alian District (Alien), a rural district in Kaohsiung, Taiwan
- Alien Sun (born 1974), Singaporean actress
- Alien, a perfume by Thierry Mugler

== See also ==
- Alians, an Islamic order
- Alien Project (disambiguation)
- Alien 4 (disambiguation)
- Alien vs. Predator (disambiguation)
- Allen (disambiguation)
- Astrobiology, the study of hypothetical alien life
- ATLiens, a 1996 album by OutKast
- Predator (disambiguation)
- UFO (disambiguation)
- Unidentified flying object (disambiguation)
- Outsider (disambiguation)
