= Alien 2 (disambiguation) =

Aliens (film), also known as "Alien 2" and "Aliens 2", is a 1986 film by James Cameron, the sequel to the 1979 film Alien by Ridley Scott, and the second film in the Aliens/Xenomorph/Alien film series.

Alien 2 or Alien II, may also refer to:

  - Aliens: Alien 2 (game), a 1987 video game, a movie-tie-in game to the 1986 James Cameron film
  - Aliens (soundtrack), a 1987 film soundtrack album for the 1986 James Cameron film, also called "Alien 2" and "Aliens 2"
  - Aliens (novel), a 1986 novelization by Allen Dean Foster of the 1986 James Cameron film, also called "Alien 2" and "Aliens 2"; see List of Alien (franchise) novels
  - Aliens (comics), a 1989 comic book adaptation by Dark Horse Comics of the 1986 James Cameron film, also called "Alien 2" and "Aliens 2"; see List of Alien (franchise) comics
- Alien 2: On Earth (film), a 1980 Italian film, a knock-off sequel to the 1979 Ridley Scott film
- Alien #2" (character), a fictional character, a supporting character and featured henchman from the Japanese anime 2001 animated TV series Puni Puni Poemy
- Alien II (album), a 1989 album by Swedish rock band Alien (band)

== See also ==
- Alien (disambiguation)
