= Alien 1 (disambiguation) =

Alien (film) is a 1979 film by Ridley Scott, also known as "Alien 1" and "Aliens 1", the first film in the Aliens/Xenomorph/Alien film series, the preceding film to the 1986 film Aliens by James Cameron.

Alien 1 or Aliens I may also refer to:

- Alien (soundtrack), a 1979 film soundtrack album for the 1979 Ridley Scott film, also called "Alien 1" and "Aliens 1"
- Alien (novel), a 1979 novelization by Allen Dean Foster of the 1979 Ridley Scott film, also called "Alien 1" and "Aliens 1"; see List of Alien (franchise) novels
- Alien: The Original Screenplay (comics), a 2020 comic book adaptation by Dark Horse Comics of the original Dan O'Bannon movie script, also called "Alien I" and "Aliens I"; see List of Alien (franchise) comics
- Alien #1" (character), a fictional character, a supporting character and featured henchman from the Japanese anime 2001 animated TV series Puni Puni Poemy
- Alien (album), a 1988 album by Swedish rock band 'Alien' (band), also known as "Alien I", the first album of several named "Alien" by the band

== See also ==
- Alien (disambiguation)
