= The Air That I Breathe =

1972 song by Albert Hammond and Mike Hazlewood

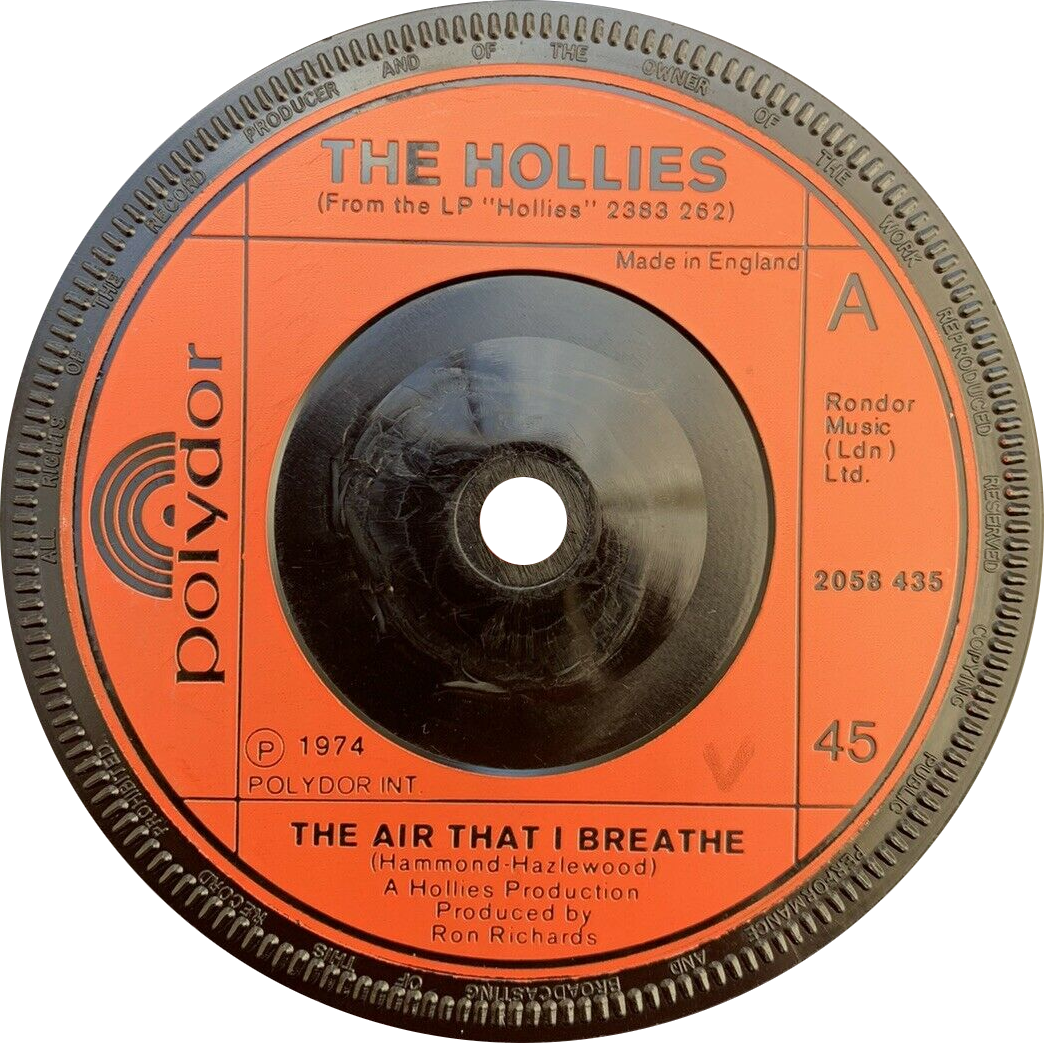
- Side A of UK single

Single by the Hollies

from the album Hollies
- B-side: "No More Riders"
- Released: January 1974
- Recorded: 15 and 22 November 1973
- Studio: EMI Studios, London
- Genre: Rock; pop
- Length: 4:13 (album version) 3:45 (single version)
- Label: UK: Polydor; US: Epic
- Songwriters: Albert Hammond, Michael Hazlewood
- Producers: Ron Richards and the Hollies

The Hollies singles chronology
"The Day That Curly Billy Shot Down Crazy Sam Mcgee" (1973)	"The Air That I Breathe" (1974)	"Son of a Rotten Gambler" (1974)

Alternative release
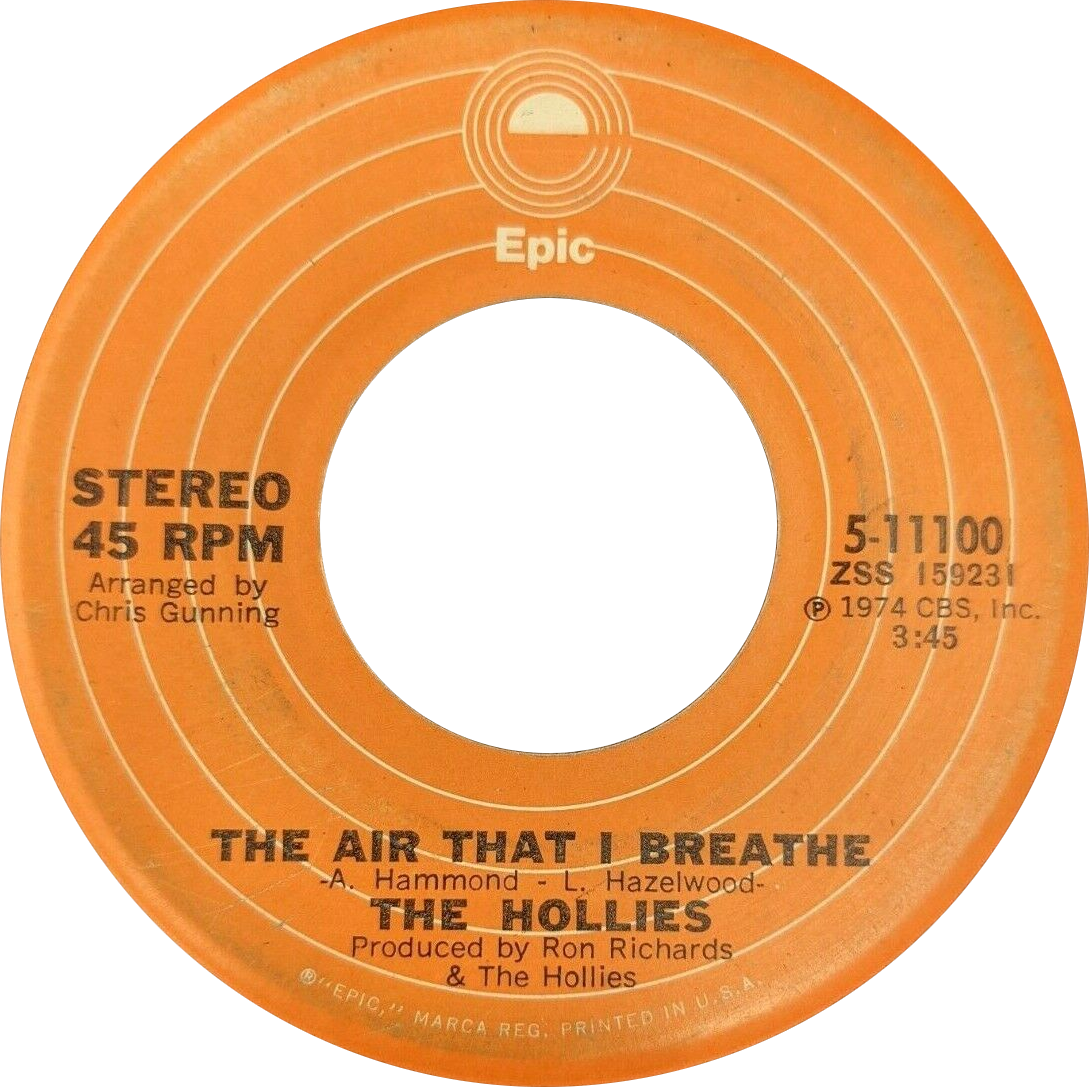
- Side A of US single (Epic)

"The Air That I Breathe" is a song written by the British-Gibraltarian singer-songwriter Albert Hammond and the English songwriter Mike Hazlewood. It was initially recorded by Hammond on his debut album, It Never Rains in Southern California (1972), and then by Phil Everly in 1973.

In early 1974, a version by the Hollies reached number two on the UK singles chart. It was the Hollies' last major hit. The English rock band Radiohead reused the chord progression and melody of "The Air That I Breathe" for their 1992 song "Creep".

== Recording ==
"The Air That I Breathe" was written by the British-Gibraltarian singer-songwriter Albert Hammond and the English singer-songwriter Mike Hazelwood. Hammond recorded the first version for his 1972 album It Never Rains in Southern California. In 1973, the American singer Phil Everly recorded a cover for his debut solo album Star Spangled Springer. Singer songwriter Warren Zevon arranged the Phil Everly version.

The EMI producer Ron Richards heard the Everly brothers version and felt it had the potential to become a hit. He brought it to the English band the Hollies, who recorded a cover in EMI Studios at Abbey Road, London. The Hollies version was engineered by Alan Parsons. The drummer, Bobby Elliott, overdubbed "huge" tom fills processed with plate reverb, which Parsons said "brought the song to life". According to Parsons, the guitarist Eric Clapton said the first note of "The Air That I Breathe" had "more soul" than anything he had ever heard.

== Release ==
In early 1974, the Hollies' version of "The Air That I Breathe" reached number 2 on the UK singles chart. In mid-1974, it reached number 6 in the United States on the Billboard Hot 100 chart and number 3 on the Adult Contemporary chart. In Canada, it reached number 5 on the RPM charts. This version featured a string orchestra arrangement and a horn section. Record World said that "the potent material gets a super interpretation". It was the Hollies' last major hit.

== "Creep" ==
The English rock band Radiohead reused the chord progression and melody of "The Air That I Breathe" for their 1992 song "Creep". After Rondor Music, the publisher of "The Air That I Breathe", took legal action, Hammond and Hazlewood received cowriting credits and a percentage of the royalties. Hammond said Radiohead were honest about having reused the song, and so he and Hazlewood accepted only a small part of the royalties.

== Personnel ==
Credits from Richard Buskin and engineer Alan Parsons.

The Hollies

- Allan Clarke – lead, harmony, and backing vocals
- Tony Hicks – harmony and backing vocals, electric lead guitar; acoustic rhythm guitar (uncertain)
- Terry Sylvester – harmony and backing vocals, acoustic rhythm guitar
- Bobby Elliott – drums, additional overdubbed tom-toms
- Bernie Calvert – bass

=== Additional musicians and production staff ===
- The Hollies – producers
- Ron Richards – producer
- Alan Parsons – engineer
- Chris Gunning – orchestral arrangements

== Charts ==
=== Weekly charts ===
Chart (1974)	Peak position
Australia (Kent Music Report)	2
Austria (Ö3 Austria Top 40)	3
Canada Top Singles (RPM)	5
Canada Adult Contemporary (RPM)	5
Ireland (IRMA)	6
Netherlands (Gfk Top 100 Singles)	1
New Zealand (Listener)	1
South Africa (Springbok)	1
UK Singles (Official Charts)	2
US Billboard Hot 100	6
US Easy Listening (Billboard)	3
US Cash Box Top 100	7
West Germany (Official German Charts)	4

Chart (1988)	Peak position
Ireland (IRMA)	30
UK (Music Week)	60

=== Year-end charts ===
Chart (1974)	Rank
Australia (Kent Music Report)	26
Canada	69
Netherlands	15
South Africa	9
US Billboard Hot 100	50
US Cash Box Top 100	66

== Certifications ==
Region	Certification	Certified units/sales
United Kingdom (BPI)	Gold	400,000^{‡}
United States (RIAA)	Gold	1,000,000^{^}
^{^} Shipments figures based on certification alone.^{‡} Sales+streaming figures based on certification alone.

== Simply Red version ==
"The Air That I Breathe"

Single by Simply Red

from the album Blue
- Released: 10 August 1998
- Length: 4:24
- Label: EastWest
- Songwriters: Albert Hammond; Mike Hazlewood
- Producer: AGM

Simply Red singles chronology
"Say You Love Me" (1998)	"The Air That I Breathe" (1998)	"Ghetto Girl" (1998)

Music video
- "The Air That I Breathe" on YouTube

British soul and pop band Simply Red released a cover of "The Air That I Breathe" on their sixth album, "Blue" (1998). It peaked at number five in Scotland, number six in the UK and number 17 in Austria. On the Eurochart Hot 100, it reached number 35. A music video was also produced to promote the single.

=== Critical reception ===
Gene Armstrong from Arizona Daily Star declared the Simply Red version as "a sexy version". J.D. Considine from The Baltimore Sun felt "his Marvin Gaye-like" take on the track "is wonderfully audacious". Larry Flick from Billboard viewed it as "an inspired, groove-laden interpretation", remarking that "Hucknall brings his signature soul to the track, vamping with glee while the band pumps a mild, jeep-styled beat that is hard enough for R&B listeners but soft enough to tickle the fancy of AC and triple-A radio listeners." He added, "Popsters will soon be treated to a bevy of remixes by Sean "Puffy" Combs and Stevie J., which should make top 40 punters quickly sit up and take notice." A reviewer from Daily Record commented, "You'll be looking for a breath of fresh air after hearing Mick Hucknall's middle-of-the-road reworking of this song which was originally a hit for The Hollies. The band desperately need a dose of originality."

=== Track listings ===
- CD single, Europe (1998)
1. "The Air That I Breathe" – 4:24
2. "The Air That I Breathe" (Reprise) – 4:35
3. "So Many People" (Live) – 5:44
4. "Never Never Love" (Live) – 4:34
- CD single CD1, UK (1998)
1. "The Air That I Breathe" – 4:24
2. "Tu Sei Dentro Di Me (Someday In My Life)" – 4:02
3. "Lives And Loves" (Live) – 3:32
- CD single CD2, Europe and UK (1998)
1. "The Air That I Breathe" (Reprise) – 4:35
2. "The Air That I Breathe" – 4:24
3. "Love Has Said Goodbye Again" (Rae & Christian Mix) – 5:14

=== Charts ===
Chart (1998)	Peak position
Austria (Ö3 Austria Top 40)	17
Belgium (Ultratip Bubbling Under Flanders)	15
Europe (Eurochart Hot 100)	35
Germany (GfK)	66
Netherlands (Single Top 100)	82
Scottish Singles Sales (Official Charts)	5
UK Singles (Official Charts)	6

=== Year-end charts ===
Chart (1998)	Position
UK Singles (OCC)	142

=== Certifications ===
Region	Certification	Certified units/sales
United Kingdom (BPI) Sales since 2004	Silver	200,000^{‡}
^{‡} Sales+streaming figures based on certification alone.

=== Release history ===
Region	Date	Format(s)	Label(s)	Ref(s).
United States	28 April 1998	Rhythmic contemporary radio	EastWest	
United States	5 May 1998	Contemporary hit radio	EastWest	
United States	11 May 1998	Adult contemporary radio	EastWest	
United Kingdom	10 August 1998	CD; cassette	EastWest	

== Belinda Carlisle version ==
"The Air That I Breathe"

Single by Belinda Carlisle

from the album Once Upon a Time in California
- Released: June 6, 2025
- Genre: Pop rock, soft rock
- Label: Demon, Edsel
- Producer: Gabe Lopez

Belinda Carlisle singles chronology
"Never Alone (feat. Nicholas Hamilton)" (2025)	"The Air That I Breathe" (2025)	"Get Together" (2025)

American singer-songwriter Belinda Carlisle released a cover of "The Air That I Breathe" as a single on 6 June 2025. The song was her first single for her new studio album, Once Upon a Time in California (2025). A music video was filmed to promote the single.

=== Critical reception ===
Reviews for Carlisle's cover of the song were generally positive, with Kenyth of Life In Cartoon Motion writing, "The song drifts in on a breeze of soft keys and gentle percussion, anchored by Carlisle’s unmistakable voice, which remains as rich, radiant, and refreshing as ever." and Davearama of Poptastic Confessions! wrote, "Belinda gives a strong vocal perforrnance. It's a pretty faithful cover."

== Other cover versions ==
- Phil Everly on his 1973 album Star Spangled Springer.
- Olivia Newton-John on her 1975 album Have You Never Been Mellow and later on her Deluxe Edition 2022-issued Olivia Newton-John's Greatest Hits.
- Mary Travers on her 1978 album It's in Everyone of Us.
- Rex Allen Jr. in 1983; this version was released for the country music market. Allen's version peaked at number 37 on the Billboard Hot Country Singles chart in December 1983.
- Julio Iglesias in 1984 on his album 1100 Bel Air Place, which established him as a star in the English-speaking entertainment industry.
- Alien on the 1989 US release of their first album Alien
- Judy Collins on her 1990 album Fires of Eden
- Barry Manilow on his 1996 album Summer of '78
- Randy Vanwarmer on his 1996 album Sun, Moon and Stars
- k.d. lang on her 1997 album Drag
- Semisonic on their "Singing in my Sleep" single in 1998.
- The Mavericks on their self-titled 2003 album. Their version peaked at number 59 on the Billboard Hot Country Songs chart.
- A remixed version of the song was used in the trailer for Saw X.
- Another remixed version was used in the trailer for Heretic.
