= The Flying Saucer Conspiracy =

UFO book by Donald Keyhoe

- Author: Donald Keyhoe
- Publisher: Holt
- Publication date: 1955
- Publication place: United States
- Pages: 315
- ISBN: 9781523928668
- LC Class: TL 789 .K39 1955
- Preceded by: Flying Saucers from Outer Space

The Flying Saucer Conspiracy is a 1955 book authored by early UFO researcher Donald Keyhoe. The book pointedly accused elements of United States government of engaging in a conspiracy to cover up knowledge of flying saucers. Keyhoe claims the existence of a "silence group" of orchestrating this conspiracy.

Historian of folklore Curtis Peebles argues: "The Flying Saucer Conspiracy marked a shift in Keyhoe's belief system. No longer were flying saucers the central theme; that now belonged to the silence group and its coverup. For the next two decades Keyhoe's beliefs about this would dominate the flying saucer myth." Keyhoe argued that 'the United States had developed protocols in dealing with UFOs and actively undertook measures to silence critics hide the existence of extraterrestrial life'. Keyhoe spread sensationalized claims, ultimately stemming from optical illusions, of unusual structures on the Moon.

The Flying Saucer Conspiracy also incorporated legends of the Bermuda Triangle disappearances.

== Contents ==
=== Vanishing planes ===
On November 23, 1953, a F-89 fighter was scrambled out of Kimross Field to intercept an unknown radar contact. The fighter was lost over Lake Superior, leading to unsubstantiated rumors that a plane had 'hit a flying saucer'. Military sources dismissed the loss as entirely mundane, arguing "they had engine trouble and crashed in the lake. In his book, Keyhoe alleges the loss was covered up, writing "Later I learned it had appeared in the early edition of the Chicago Tribune headed 'Jet, Two Aboard, Vanishes Over Lake Superior.' It was deleted from all other editions."

On December 5, 1945, five Torpedo Bombers had disappeared during an over-water training mission east of Fort Lauderdale Naval Air Station. The loss of the five planes would later become part of Bermuda Triangle folklore. Keyhoe's book features, without evidence, the suggestion that "the saucers took them".

=== UFO 'coverup' orders ===
A major narrative trace's Keyoes alleged discovery of two Air Force orders that he believes constitute a cover-up. In Chapter One, "Blackout", Keyhoe describes learning of Air Force orders that, according to Keyhoe, forbid military pilots from public reporting of UFO sightings.

The third chapter, "The Silence Group Strikes", Keyhoe discusses how 'in August, 1952, the censors temporarily lost control, after mass sightings in July had caused wide alarm." Keyhoe claims that "Under a new policy, set by General Samford, I was invited to the Pentagon and offered the most baffling UFO reports in Air Force Intelligence files-cases pointing clearly to the interplanetary answer." In contrast, Keyhoe claims others in the Pentagon attempted to censor those cases.

While investigating the Truax statement, Keyhoe is told about a classified order, Air Force Regulation 200-2, that all tangible evidence must be flown immediately to ATIC (Air Technical Intelligence Center) at Dayton. The order allegedly forbid public release of UFO reports, requiring that "only hoaxes, practical jokes, and erroneous UFO reports can be given to the press."

=== A benevolent conspiracy ===
In the forward, Keyhoe charges that the Air Force began refusing to share information with public in December 1953. Keyhoe 'conspiracy' is not a sinister one, as he explains: "In revealing this censorship, I am not attacking the Air Force as a whole. Most of the officers and officials I have encountered are simply obeying orders. Nor do I attribute unpatriotic motives to the 'silence group' members who originate these orders. Undoubtedly they are actuated by a high motive -- the need, as the see it, to protect the public from possible hysteria..."

=== Satellite search and other worlds ===
In Chapter Two, "The First Clue", Keyhoe describes rumors of an orbiting 'space base' which he alleges is being covered up. Chapter Eight, "Satellite Search", discusses Clyde Tombaugh and his search for near-Earth satellites. In Chapter Four, "Unknown Worlds", Keyhoe reflects on an astronomer's recent estimate that inhabited planets might number in the hundreds of millions.

In Chapter Five, "Enigma on the Moon", Keyhoe claimed that spectroscopic analysis had identified a metal bridge on the Moon. Keyhoe speculates about a base on the Moon. Chapter Nine, "Mystery on Mars", examines claims that UFOs may come from the red planet. Keyhoe argues that "since 1947 each close approach of Mars-at 26-month intervals-had brought a sudden increase in flying-saucer sightings."

=== Gravitation propulsion ===
Keyhoe encounters a Canadian UFO researcher, Wilbert Brockhouse Smith, who argues "The discs may create their own gravitational field — that is, they could nullify the pull of the Earth's gravity. If this is true, then living creatures on board could withstand sharp turns and swift accelerations. Actually, they would feel nothing unusual, for the force propelling the discs would apply simultaneously to every object and every being aboard." In Chapter Seventeen, "Oberth and the G-Field", Keyhoe discusses speculation about gravitational propulsion from professor Hermann Oberth.

=== Angel hair ===
Chapter Sixteen, "Angel's Hair", discusses an alleged material associated with flying saucer.

== Reactions and legacy ==
The New York Times called the book a "repetitious and unconvincing attack on [Keyhoe]'s greatest enemy, the air force 'silence group' ". The Library Journal acknowledged that the book was "less fantastic than those of other writers in this field" and "makes fascinating reading". In 1958, mystic-psychoanalyst Carl Jung recommended Keyhoe's books as works that are "based on official material and studiously avoid the wild speculation, naivete, or prejudice of other publications."

In 1961, Betty Hill had read The Flying Saucer Conspiracy in the days prior to her "recalling" a UFO contact experience. Her husband, Barney Hill, later underwent hypnosis during which he became the first person to claim to recall an abduction experience.

In later decades, the UFO conspiracy theories initiated by Keyhoe would turn increasingly dark and anti-government in the hands of others. Historian Felix Harcourt contrasts Keyhoe's 'conspiracy of silence' with later UFO conspiracy theories, saying: "What's interesting about Keyhoe is he does see a conspiracy by the military to cover up the reality that Earth is being visited by these flying saucers, but he doesn't blame them for doing so. For Keyhoe, what he calls 'the silence group' is acting out of a desire to protect national security and a desire to prevent a public hysteria. And while he disagrees with that decision, he sees it as matter of reasonable disagreement. He doesn't see nefarious motives at work... And that is an idea that is going to change significantly over the 60s and especially coming out of the 70s into the 80s."
