= AVP =

AVP may stand for:

== Organizations and companies ==
=== Business ===
- Assistant/associate/area vice president, a title; see vice president
- Avon Products (stock ticker symbol AVP)

=== Other organizations ===
- Aarakshan Virodhi Party, Indian political party
- Alternatives to Violence Project, volunteer-run non-violence program
- Aruban People's Party (Arubaanse Volkspartij/Partido di Pueblo Arubano), Aruban political party
- Association of Volleyball Professionals, United States
- National Coalition of Anti-Violence Programs, aka Anti-Violence Project/Program
- AVP Research Foundation, research department of the Ayurvedic Trust

== Transportation ==
- A US Navy hull classification symbol: Small seaplane tender (AVP)

=== Facilities ===
- Wilkes-Barre/Scranton International Airport (IATA airport code AVP) in Avoca, Pennsylvania
- Aylesbury Vale Parkway railway station (rail station code AVP)

== Medicine and biology ==
- Anthrax Vaccine Precipitated, a British anthrax vaccine
- Arginine vasopressin, the form of the antidiuretic hormone vasopressin found in most mammals
- AVP gene

== Popular culture ==
- Alien vs. Predator, a science fiction franchise
  - Alien vs. Predator (film)

== Other uses ==
- Attribute–value pair, data representation in computing systems and applications
- Alternative vote plus, a voting system
- Apple Vision Pro, a mixed-reality headset
- Atharvaveda-Paippalada, a recension of Atharvaveda

== See also ==
- Alien vs. Predator (disambiguation)
