= Predator (disambiguation) =

A predator is an organism (usually an animal) that kills other organism (usually another animal) to eat.

Predator or The Predator may also refer to:

== Entertainment and media ==
=== Films and spin-offs ===
- Predators (2025 film), documentary about television program To Catch a Predator
- Predator (franchise), a science-fiction franchise revolving around extraterrestrial trophy hunters
  - Predator (film), 1987 film that established the franchise
  - Predator 2, 1990 film starring Danny Glover
  - Predators (2010 film), film starring Adrien Brody
  - The Predator (film), 2018 film directed by Shane Black
  - Prey (2022 film), film set in 18th century in indigenous North America
  - Predator: Badlands, 2025 film starring Elle Fanning
  - Predator (fictional species), the extraterrestrial species featured in the film
  - List of Predator comics
  - Predator (novel series), 1987–2022
  - Predator (video game), 1987 side-scrolling action game
  - Predators (video game), 2010 real-time strategy game

=== Literature ===
==== Comics ====
- Predators, 2017 graphic novel by Jason Latour and Robbi Rodriguez in the Spider-Gwen series

==== Fiction ====
- Predator, 1987 novelization of the film by Paul Monette
- Predator, 1993 novel by William F. Wu in the Isaac Asimov's Robots in Time series
- Predator (Cornwell novel), 2005 novel by Patricia Cornwell
- Predator, 2010 novel by Terri Blackstock
- Predator, 2013 novel by Faye Kellerman
- Predator (Smith novel), 2016 novel by Wilbur Smith
- Predator, 2016 novel by Gail Z. Martin
- Predators, 1993 novel by Ed Gorman and Martin H. Greenberg
- Predators, 2003 novel by Anna Salter
- Predators, 2018 novel by Michaelbrent Collings
- The Predator, 1968 novel in the Jonas Wilde: Eliminator Saga series by Christopher Nicole writing under the name Andrew York
- The Predator, 1976 novel by Denis Pitts
- The Predator, 1980 novel by Russell Braddon
- The Predator (novel), 1996 novel by K. A. Applegate; the fifth book in the Animorphs series
- The Predator, 2001 novel by Michael Ridpath
- The Predator, 2018 novel by Christopher Golden and Mark Morris; the novelization of the film
- The Predators, 1998 novel by Harold Robbins

==== Non-fiction ====
- Predator: Rape, Madness, and Injustice in Seattle, 1991 book by Jack Olsen
- Predator!, 1991 book by Bruce Brooks; the first installment in the Knowing Nature series

=== Music ===
- Predator (album), by Accept (1996)
- The Predator (Ice Cube album), and its title track (1992)
- The Predator (EP), by Ice Nine Kills (2013)
- The Predators (Japanese band) (2005)
- The Predators (Australian band) (2005)

=== Television ===
- Predator, a television ident for BBC Two, first aired in 2000; see BBC Two '1991–2001' idents

==== Episodes ====
- "Predator", Fact or Faked: Paranormal Files season 1, episode 4a (2010)
- "Predator", Flipper (1995) season 3, episode 16 (1999)
- "Predator", Mountain Men season 3, episode 12 (2014)
- "Predator", NCIS: Los Angeles season 1, episode 3 (2009)
- "Predator", Sealab 2021 season 1, episode 5 (2001)
- "Predator", The First 48 season 19, episode 24 (2018)
- "Predator", The Ultimate Fighter: A New World Champion episode 6 (2017)
- "Predators", 24 Hours in Police Custody series 8, episode 1 (2019)
- "Predators", Badger series 2, episode 5 (2000)
- "Predators", Bless This Mess season 1, episode 4 (2019)
- "Predators", Cold Squad season 4, episode 16 (2001)
- "Predators", Deadly Women season 2, episode 6 (2009)
- "Predators", FBI: Most Wanted season 1, episode 8 (2020)
- "Predators", Future Weapons season 2, episode 7 (2007)
- "Predators", NCIS: New Orleans season 6, episode 20 (2020)
- "Predators", Strange Days on Planet Earth episode 3 (2005)
- "Predators", The Most Extreme series 2, episode 7 (2003)
- "The Predator", Captain Planet and the Planeteers season 2, episode 5 (1991)
- "The Predator", Dream Corp LLC season 1, episode 3 (2016)
- "The Predator", Horizon (British) series 31, episode 3 (1994)
- "The Predator", Love Thy Neighbor (American) season 2, episode 3 (2014)
- "The Predator", Strike Force episode 4 (1981)
- "The Predator", The Dead Files season 7, episode 15 (2016)
- "The Predator", The FBI Files season 3, episode 6 (2000)
- "The Predators", Cannon season 2, episode 6 (1972)
- "The Predators", Gunsmoke season 17, episode 20 (1972)
- "The Predators", Have Gun – Will Travel season 6, episode 8 (1962)
- "The Predators", Kung Fu season 3, episode 5 (1974)
- "The Predators", The F.B.I. season 3, episode 25 (1968)
- "The Predators", The Road West episode 17 (1967)

== Military ==
- Predator SRAW, a missile system
- MQ-1 Predator, an unmanned aerial vehicle (drone) in use since 1995
- RQ-9 Predator B, an unmanned aerial vehicle (drone) in use since 2001 and now known as the MQ-9 Reaper
- Predator C, an unmanned aerial vehicle (drone) now known as the General Atomics Avenger

== People ==
- Patrick Côté (fighter) (born 1980), Canadian mixed martial artist, nicknamed "The Predator"
- Don Frye (born 1965), American mixed martial artist, nicknamed "The Predator"
- Michael Gomez (born 1977), professional boxer, nicknamed "The Predator"
- Horace Hogan (born 1965), American professional wrestler with the ring name "The Predator"
- Sylvester Terkay (born 1970), American professional wrestler with the ring name "The Predator"
- Chase Young (born 1999), American football player, nicknamed "The Predator"
- Francis Ngannou (born 1986), French-Cameroonian mixed martial artist and current UFC Heavyweight Champion, nicknamed "The Predator."

== Sports ==
- Adidas Predator, a range of football boots
- Nashville Predators, a United States hockey team
- Orlando Predators, a United States arena football team
- Laval Predators, a Canadian hockey team in the Ligue nord-américaine de hockey

== Other uses ==
- Predator (truck), a monster truck and the team to which it belongs
- Predator (roller coaster)
- Sexual predator
- Predator, an agricultural-aircraft design by Burt Rutan
- Acer Predator, a gaming computer brand
- Predator, a nickname given to the PKP class EN100
- Predator, brand of pool (cue sports) cues
- Predator spyware, developed by Cytrox

== See also ==
- Predator X (disambiguation)
- Apex Predator (disambiguation)
- Superpredators (disambiguation)
- Alien vs. Predator (disambiguation)
- Alien (disambiguation)
