= Apex Predator (disambiguation) =

An apex predator is a predator residing at the top of a food chain on which no other creatures prey.

Apex Predator may also refer to:

== Music ==
- Apex Predator (Crooked I album) or its title track "Apex Predator (My Gun Go)"
- Apex Predator – Easy Meat, a 2015 album by Napalm Death, or its title track
- "Apex Predator", a 2013 song by Otep from Hydra
- "Apex Predator", a 2014 song by Cavalera Conspiracy from Pandemonium
- "Apex Predator", a 2017 song from the musical Mean Girls

== Other uses ==
- Randy Orton or The Apex Predator (born 1980), American professional wrestler
- Apex Predator, a beer brewed by Off Color Brewing
- Apex Predators, a mercenary group in Titanfall 2
- Apex Predator, a rank in Apex Legends
- Rehman Dakait a.k.a. "Apex Predator", a character in the 2025 Indian film Dhurandhar, portrayed by Akshaye Khanna
- Apex Predator (film), a 2021 Bruce Willis film, also released as Apex

== See also ==
- Apex (disambiguation)
- Predator (disambiguation)
- Superpredators (disambiguation)
