= The Heart of L.A. =

The Heart Of L.A.

Compilation album by AOR
- Released: 17 March 2017
- Genre: Hard rock
- Length: 1:16:11
- Label: Perris Records
- Producer: Frédéric Slama

The Heart of L.A. is the third compilation album edited by the French musician Frédéric Slama project AOR, released on 17 March 2017. Is a recording that where you can find 14 selected remastered tracks from the past plus 2 previously unreleased songs. It was produced, written and arranged by Slama and counting with many musicians as guest as is common in their previous efforts. It was released under Perris Records label, CDs were sold directly in Amazon, CD Baby Store and also counts with digital distribution.

At the moment of be released it was listed in the fourth position of the Top 5 Seller of the year 2017 in Perris Records website, and quickly received numerous reviews worldwide.

== Guest singers per track ==
As AOR is a One Man Band, Frédéric Slama as always searched several international singers to record his compositions, in this record he counted with the French vocalists Sarah and Mélissa Fontaine from the band Chasing Violets whom shared duties in the tracks The Main Attraction, Don't Turn Back and When The Darkness Falls the last two under the nickname The FMS Project.

== Track listing ==
All music is composed by Frédéric Slama

No.	Title	Length
1.	"Angels Never Sleep [feat. Jesse Damon]"	5:18
2.	"The Smartest Girl in L.A. [feat. Jeff Scott Soto]"	3:45
3.	"On The Edge Of Glory [feat. Bill Champlin]"	6:56
4.	"Deep Whirlpool [feat. Fergie Frederiksen]"	4:49
5.	"The Main Attraction [feat. Chasing Violets]"	4:40
6.	"Heart in Pawn [feat. Steve Overland]"	5:25
7.	"Jenny at Midnight [feat. Joe Pasquale]"	4:32
8.	"Silent Victory [feat. Paul Shortino]"	5:24
9.	"Dangerous To Know [feat. Rick Riso]"	4:47
10.	"One Foot in Heaven [feat. Kevin Chalfant]"	4:32
11.	"Closer To Zero [feat. David Forbes]"	4:21
12.	"Secrets in the Shadows [feat. Jim Jidhed]"	5:36
13.	"You're My Obsession Jim Jidhed"	3:27
14.	"From L.A. To Paris [feat. Chris Ousey]"	4:09
15.	"Don't Turn Back [feat. The FMS Project]"	4:02
16.	"When The Darkness Falls [feat. The FMS Project] (Hi-Tech AOR Version)"	3:58

== Additional information ==
"Don't Turn Back" and "When The Darkness Falls", are unreleased tracks from The FMS Project.

== Personnel ==
- Frédéric Slama – guitar & keyboards
- Tommy Denander – guitar, bass guitar & keyboards

=== Additional musicians ===
- Jesse Damon – lead vocals & Backing vocals
- Jeff Scott Soto – lead vocals & Backing vocals
- Bill Champlin – lead vocals & Backing vocals
- Fergie Frederiksen – lead vocals & Backing vocals
- Sarah Fontaine – lead vocals & Backing vocals
- Mélissa Fontaine – lead vocals & Backing vocals
- Steve Overland – lead vocals & Backing vocals
- Joe Pasquale – lead vocals & Backing vocals
- Paul Shortino – lead vocals & Backing vocals
- Rick Riso – lead vocals & Backing vocals
- Kevin Chalfant – lead vocals & Backing vocals
- David Forbes – lead vocals & Backing vocals
- Jim Jidhed – lead vocals & Backing vocals
- Philip Bardowell – lead vocals & Backing vocals
- Chris Ousey – lead vocals & Backing vocals
- Paul Sabu – lead vocals & Backing vocals

=== Production ===
- Producers – Frédéric Slama and Tommy Denander.

== Press and media reviews ==
The band released a five-tracks video sampler in their YouTube Channel where fans and media could hear and get enough info about the recording.

- Review made by Mark Rockpit from The Rockpit
- Review made by Valeria Campagnale from My Global Mind
- Review made by Steve Price from Rocktopia The Melodic Rock Website
- Review available in Rock Report Website
- Review available in Wescoast Website
