= Alien 4 (disambiguation) =

Alien Resurrection, also known as Alien 4, is a 1997 film by Jean-Pierre Jeunet and the fourth film in the Alien film series.

Alien 4 or Alien IV may also refer to:

- Alien Resurrection (soundtrack), a 1997 soundtrack album to the film
- Alien Resurrection (novel), a 1997 novelization by A. C. Crispin of the film; see List of Alien (franchise) novels
- Alien Resurrection (comics), a 1997 comic book adaptation by Dark Horse Comics the film; see List of Alien (franchise) comics
- Alien Resurrection (video game), a 2000 shooter game adaptation of the film
- Alien 4 (album), a 1995 album by Hawkwind
- Alien IV? (film), a 1994 short film starring C. Ernst Harth

== See also ==
- Alien (disambiguation)
