= Earth vs. the Flying Saucers =

1956 science fiction film directed by Fred F. Sears

- Theatrical release poster
- Directed by: Fred F. Sears
- Screenplay by: George Worthing Yates; Bernard Gordon as Raymond T. Marcus
- Story by: Curt Siodmak
- Based on: Flying Saucers from Outer Space; 1953 book by Donald Keyhoe
- Produced by: Charles H. Schneer; Sam Katzman (executive)
- Starring: Hugh Marlowe; Joan Taylor
- Cinematography: Fred Jackman. Jr.
- Edited by: Danny B. Landres
- Music by: Mischa Bakaleinikoff (uncredited)
- Color process: Black and white
- Production company: Clover Productions
- Distributed by: Columbia Pictures
- Release date: June 13, 1956 (Los Angeles)
- Running time: 84 minutes
- Country: United States
- Language: English
- Box office: $1,250,000 (US rentals)

Earth vs. the Flying Saucers (1956) by Fred F. Sears, trailer

Earth vs. the Flying Saucers (a.k.a. Invasion of the Flying Saucers and Flying Saucers from Outer Space) is a 1956 American science-fiction film from Columbia Pictures. It was produced by Charles H. Schneer, directed by Fred F. Sears, and stars Hugh Marlowe and Joan Taylor. The stop-motion animation special effects were created by Ray Harryhausen. The storyline was suggested by the bestselling 1953 nonfiction book Flying Saucers from Outer Space by Maj. Donald Keyhoe. The film was released as a double feature with The Werewolf.

== Plot summary ==
Scientist Dr. Russell Marvin and his new bride Carol are driving to work when a flying saucer appears overhead. With no proof of the encounter other than a tape recording of the ship's sound, Dr. Marvin is hesitant to notify his superiors. He is in charge of Project Skyhook, an American space program that has already launched 10 research satellites into orbit. General Hanley, Carol's father, informs Marvin that many of the satellites have since fallen back to Earth. Marvin admits that he has lost contact with all of them and privately suspects alien involvement. The Marvins then witness the 11th falling from the sky shortly after launch.

When a saucer lands at the Skyhook facility the next day in front of the main building, a group of aliens in metallic suits exits with one alien walking peacefully into the entrance of the building, while being fired upon by the infantry guards, killing the one alien, while the remaining aliens and saucer are protected by a force field. After retrieving the body of the dead alien, the saucer lifts off, returning the fire and spreading destruction across the facility, and killing everyone but the Marvins, who were trapped below ground. General Hanley is captured and taken away in the saucer. Too late, Russell discovers and decodes a message on his tape recorder. The aliens just wanted to meet with Dr. Marvin and for that purpose landed at Skyhook, where they were met with violence. ("Shoot first, ask questions later.")

Marvin contacts the aliens by radio and sneaks away to meet them, followed closely by Carol and Major Huglin. A pursuing motorcycle patrol officer and they are taken aboard a saucer, where the aliens have extracted knowledge directly from the general's brain. The aliens explain that they are the last of their species, having fled from their destroyed star system. They are extremely aged and are kept alive only by their protective garments. They have shot down all the launched satellites, fearing them as weapons. As proof of their power, the aliens give Dr. Marvin the coordinates of a naval destroyer that opened fire on them, and which they have since destroyed. Horrified by the cold, unempathetic nature of the aliens, Carol begins to break down, and the patrol officer, despite an attempt by Marvin to stop him, pulls his revolver and fires on the aliens; the aliens subject him to the same mind-control process as General Hanley. The aliens state that they will eventually return Hanley and the patrol officer. As the interaction continues, Carol becomes increasingly irrational, while Dr. Marvin tries to remain calm. Major Huglin and the Marvins are released with the message that the aliens want to meet with the world's leaders in 56 days in Washington, DC, to negotiate an occupation of Earth.

Dr. Marvin's later observations lead to the discovery that the aliens' protective suits are made of solidified electricity and grant them enhanced auditory perception. Marvin develops a counter-weapon against their flying saucers, which he later successfully tests against a single saucer. As they escape, the aliens jettison Hanley and the patrol officer, who fall to their deaths. Groups of alien saucers then attack Washington, Paris, London, and Moscow, and resistance by conventional weapons is futile, but they are destroyed by Dr. Marvin's sonic weapon. The defenders also discover that the aliens can be easily killed by small-arms gunfire when they are outside the force fields of their saucers. Upon repelling the attack and no further threats anticipated, Project Skyhook is re-established with Dr. Marvin once again placed in charge.

== Cast ==
- Hugh Marlowe as Dr. Russell A. Marvin
- Joan Taylor as Carol Marvin
- Donald Curtis as Major Huglin
- Morris Ankrum as Maj. Gen. John Hanley
- John Zaremba as Prof. Kanter
- Thomas Browne Henry as Vice-Admiral Enright
- Grandon Rhodes as General Edmunds
- Larry J. Blake as the motorcycle policeman
- Charles Evans as Dr. Alberts
- Harry Lauter as Cutting, Kanter's technician
- Paul Frees as Aliens (uncredited voice)

== Production ==
=== Visual effects ===
Ray Harryhausen used stop-motion animation to create the scenes of the flying spacecraft. For increased realism in the scenes depicting saucers crashing into monuments and government buildings, he also animated falling masonry. Some animation of figures was used to show the aliens emerging from the saucers. Much stock footage was used, including the shots, during the invasion, of a missile launch and of batteries of 90 mm M3 guns firing. Film of the destruction of HMS Barham during World War II was used to depict the sinking of a destroyer. Scenes showing satellite launches use footage of a Viking rocket takeoff and a failed V-2 rocket launch. A scene depicting planes crashing after being hit by an alien ray uses film of a 1944 accident at an airshow near Spokane, Washington, involving military aircraft.

The film's iconic flying saucer design—a stationary central cabin encircled by a rotating outer ring with slotted vanes in it—matches purported eyewitness descriptions recorded by Maj. Donald Keyhoe in his best-selling nonfiction book about UFOs. At a tribute to Harryhausen held in Sydney, Australia, the animator said that he consulted with well-known 1950s UFO "contactee" George Adamski about the depiction of the flying saucers in the film. He noted that Adamski had become quite paranoid by that time.

The voice of the aliens was produced by recording Paul Frees—in an uncredited role—on reel-to-reel audio tape. The speed control was then rapidly turned up and down by hand while the tape was played back, which had the effect of causing Frees's voice to waver in pitch and speed.

== Reception ==
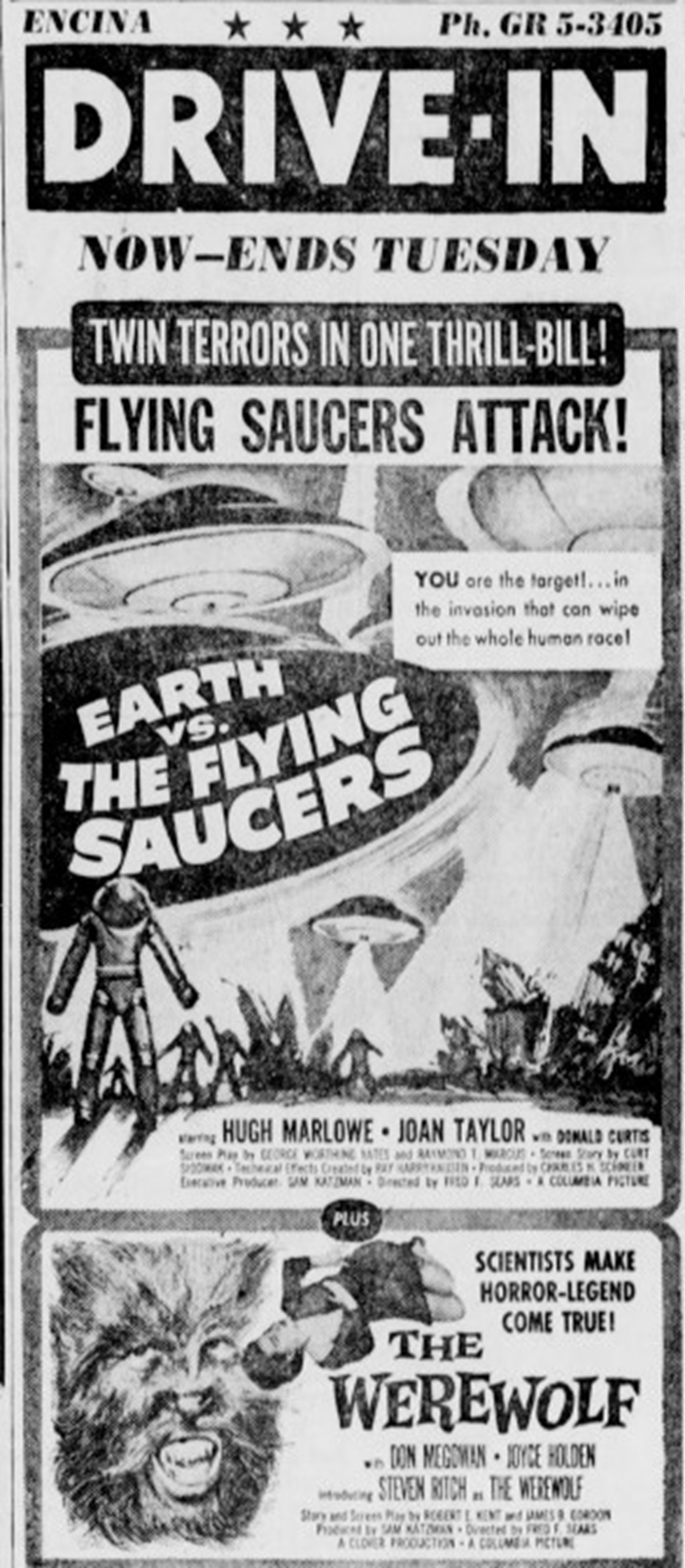
Drive-in advertisement from 1956 for Earth vs. the Flying Saucers and co-feature, The Werewolf

A reviewer for Variety commented that the special effects were the real stars of Earth vs. the Flying Saucers: "This exploitation program does a satisfactory job of entertaining in the science-fiction class. The technical effects created by Ray Harryhausen come off excellently in the Charles H. Schneer production, adding the required out-of-this-world visual touch to the screenplay, taken from a screen story by Curt Siodmak, suggested by Major Donald E. Keyhoe's Flying Saucers from Outer Space." The Los Angeles Times was also fairly positive, writing that although the saucers "look like art department concoctions", the film still "has a sort of pseudoscientific charm". The Monthly Film Bulletin gave a negative review, stating that the "semidocumentary technique" was "pretentious" and the use of stock footage, "crude model-work", and most of the best-known science-fiction clichés made the movie "a long-winded and rather bleak invasion from outer space". Bosley Crowther of the New York Times was also negative, calling it "utter nonsense that is childishly and humorlessly put forth".

Earth vs. the Flying Saucers spawned a subgenre of subsequent flying-saucer films, many of which incorporated elements contributed by Harryhausen to the seminal movie. In an article for the New York Times, film reviewer Hal Erickson noted, "Anyone who's seen the 1996 science-fiction lampoon Mars Attacks! may have trouble watching Earth vs. the Flying Saucers with a straight face". The later film could be seen as a campy homage to the era, especially the innovations of Earth vs. the Flying Saucers.

== Legacy ==
The four-issue comic book miniseries Flying Saucers vs. the Earth (2008), released by TidalWave Productions as part of their Ray Harryhausen Signature Series, reimagines the events of the film from the perspective of the alien invaders, identified in the comics as the Sons of Aberrann. A preview of the first issue was included on the 50th-anniversary DVD release of the film.

The film is partially featured in the Breaking Bad episode "Cancer Man".

== See also ==
- Fearful Attack of the Flying Saucers (1956 Japanese independent film)
