= Alien vs. Predator (disambiguation) =

Alien vs. Predator is a sci-fi horror franchise. This may also refer specifically to:

- Aliens vs. Predator (comics), several crossover comic series started in 1990
- Aliens vs. Predator (novel series), a trilogy of novels started in 1994
- Alien vs. Predator (film), a 2004 film
- Alien vs. Predator (soundtrack), a soundtrack album from the 2004 film, by Harald Kloser

== Video games ==
- Alien vs Predator (SNES video game), a 1993 video game for the Super Nintendo Entertainment System
- Alien vs. Predator (arcade game), a 1994 video game for the arcades
- Alien vs Predator (Atari Jaguar video game), a 1994 video game for the Atari Jaguar
- Aliens Versus Predator (1999 video game), a video game for personal computers
- Aliens vs. Predator (2010 video game), a video game for the PC, Xbox 360 and PlayStation 3

== See also ==
- List of Alien, Predator and Alien vs. Predator games
- Predator (disambiguation)
- Alien (disambiguation)
- AVP (disambiguation)
