= Donald Keyhoe =

American writer and UFO researcher (1897–1988)

Donald Edward Keyhoe
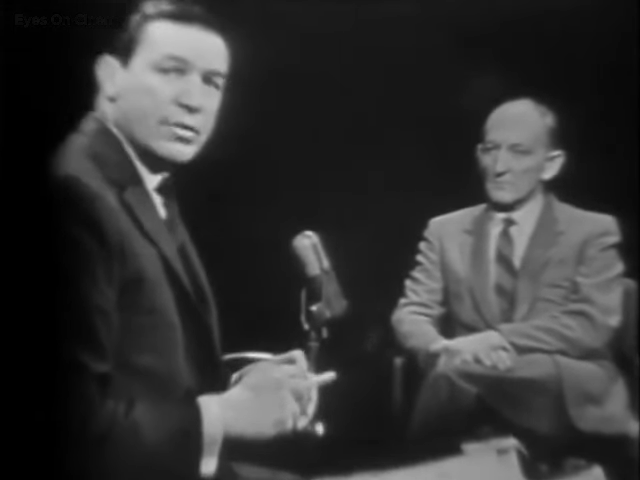
- Donald Keyhoe (right) interviewed by Mike Wallace on March 8, 1958
- Born: June 20, 1897; Ottumwa, Iowa, US
- Died: November 29, 1988 (aged 91); New Market, Virginia, US
- Education: United States Naval Academy
- Spouse: Helen Gardner
- Children: 3

Donald Edward Keyhoe (June 20, 1897 – November 29, 1988) was an American Marine Corps naval aviator, writer of aviation articles and stories in a variety of publications, and tour manager of aviation pioneer Charles Lindbergh.

In the 1950s, Keyhoe became a UFO researcher and writer, arguing that the U.S. government should conduct research into UFO matters, and should publicly release all its UFO files.

== Early life and career ==
Keyhoe was born and raised in Ottumwa, Iowa. Upon receiving his B.S. degree from the United States Naval Academy in 1919, he was commissioned as a second lieutenant in the United States Marine Corps.

In 1922, his arm was injured during an airplane crash in Guam. During his long convalescence, Keyhoe began writing as a hobby. He eventually returned to active duty, but the injury gave Keyhoe persistent trouble, and, as a result, he resigned from the Marines in 1923. He then worked for the National Geodetic Survey and U.S. Department of Commerce.

In 1927, Keyhoe managed a coast-to-coast tour by Charles Lindbergh. This led to Keyhoe's first book, 1928's Flying With Lindbergh. The book was a success, and led to a freelance writing career, with Keyhoe's articles and fictional stories (mostly related to aviation) appearing in a variety of publications.

Keyhoe returned to active duty during World War II in a Naval Aviation Training Division before retiring again at the rank of major.

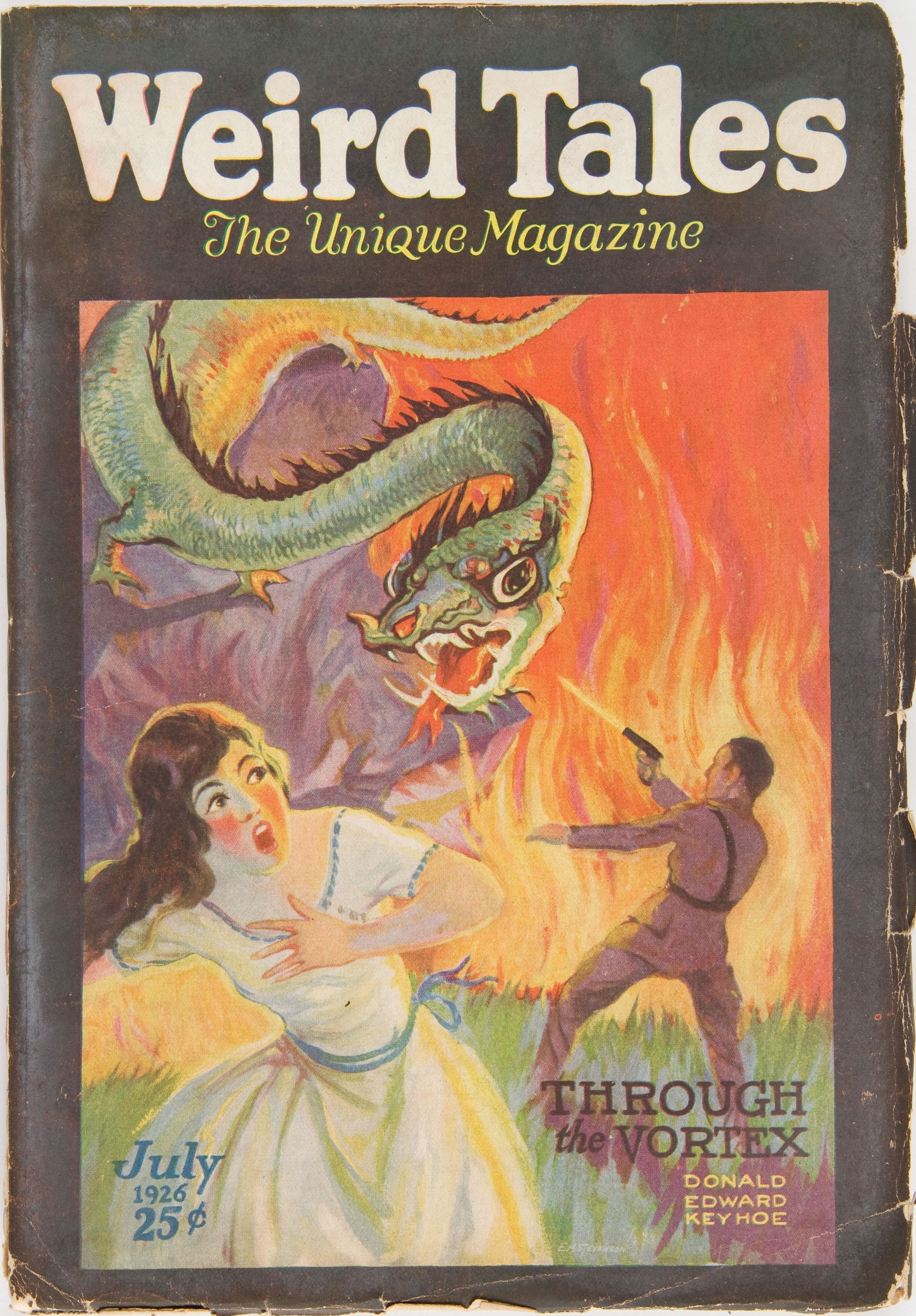
Keyhoe's "Through the Vortex" was the cover story in the July 1926 Weird Tales.

== Writing for the pulps and glossies ==
By the time his UFO books appeared, Keyhoe was already an established author, with stories in the pulp magazines of the 1920s and 1930s. Four of his short stories were printed in Weird Tales: "The Grim Passenger" (1925), "The Mystery Under the Sea" (1926), "Through the Vortex" (1926) and "The Master of Doom" (1927). He also produced the lead novel for all three issues of a short-lived magazine Dr. Yen Sin: "The Mystery of the Dragon's Shadow" (May–June 1936), "The Mystery of the Golden Skull" (July–August 1936) and "The Mystery of the Singing Mummies" (September–October 1936). Dr. Sin was opposed by a hero who could not sleep.

Keyhoe wrote a number of air adventure stories for Flying Aces, and other magazines, and created two larger-than-life adventurers in this genre. The first of these was Captain Philip Strange, referred to as "the Brain Devil" and "the Phantom Ace of G-2." Captain Strange was an American intelligence officer during World War I who was gifted with ESP and other mental powers. His existence has been perpetuated beyond Keyhoe's stories as a minor member of the Wold Newton universe.

Keyhoe's other "superpowered" flying ace was Richard Knight, a World War I veteran who was blinded in combat but gained a supernatural ability to see in the dark. Knight featured in 35 adventure stories from 1936 to 1942.

Other series he wrote included the "Eric Trent" series in Flying Aces and the "Vanished Legion" in Dare-Devil Aces, and two long-running series: "The Devildog Squadron" in Sky Birds and "The Jailbird Flight" in Battle Aces.

Many of Keyhoe's stories for the pulps were science fiction or Weird Fantasy, or contained a significant measure of these elements — a fact that was not lost on later critics of his UFO books.

He was also a freelancer for Saturday Evening Post, The Nation, and Reader's Digest.

== The Flying Saucers Are Real ==
Interest in UFOs broke out across the United States following pilot Kenneth Arnold's report of odd, fast-moving aerial objects in Washington State during the summer of 1947. Keyhoe began to follow the subject with some interest, though he was initially skeptical of any extraordinary answer to the UFO question. For some time, True (a popular American men's magazine) had been inquiring of officials as to the flying saucer question, with little to show for their efforts. In the spring of 1949, after the U.S. Air Force had released contradictory information about the saucers, editor Ken Purdy turned to Keyhoe, who had written for the magazine, but who also had friends and contacts in the military and the Pentagon.

As their forms, flight maneuvers, speeds and light technology was apparently far ahead of any nation's developments, Keyhoe became convinced that they must be the products of unearthly intelligences, and that the U.S. government was trying to suppress the whole truth about the subject. This conclusion was based especially on the response Keyhoe found when he quizzed various officials about flying saucers. He was told there was nothing to the subject, yet was simultaneously denied access to saucer-related documents. One way in which Keyhoe took it upon himself to quiz these officials was to send letters to an Executive Officer by the name of J. S. Earman. 3 letters can be found on the CIA's official website in which Keyhoe inquires towards the CIA's knowledge of UFOs. Earman's answers appear to be unsatisfactory for Major Keyhoe but at some point after this he came to the conclusion that would lead him to write The Flying Saucers Are Real. It is worth mentioning that, like many declassified CIA documents, these letters have been largely marked up in post.

Keyhoe's article "Flying Saucers Are Real" appeared in the January 1950 issue of True (published December 26, 1949) and caused a sensation. Though such figures are always difficult to verify, Captain Edward J. Ruppelt, the first head of Project Blue Book, reported that "It is rumored among magazine publishers that Don Keyhoe's article in True was one of the most widely read and widely discussed magazine articles in history."

Capitalizing on the interest, Keyhoe expanded the article into a book, The Flying Saucers Are Real (1950); it sold over half a million copies in paperback. He argued that the Air Force knew that flying saucers were extraterrestrial, but downplayed the reports to avoid public panic. In Keyhoe's view, the aliens — wherever their origins or intentions — did not seem hostile, and had likely been surveilling the Earth for two hundred years or more, though Keyhoe wrote that their "observation suddenly increased in 1947, following the series of A-bomb explosions in 1945." Michael D. Swords characterized the book as "a rather sensational but accurate account of the matter." (Swords, p. 100) Boucher and McComas praised it as "cogent, intelligent and persuasive."

Keyhoe wrote several more books about UFOs. Flying Saucers from Outer Space (Holt, 1953) was largely based on interviews and official reports vetted by the Air Force. The book included a blurb by Albert M. Chop, the Air Force's press secretary in the Pentagon, who characterized Keyhoe as a "responsible, accurate reporter" and further expressed approval for Keyhoe's arguments in favor of the extraterrestrial hypothesis.

Carl Jung argued that Keyhoe's first two books were "based on official material and studiously avoid the wild speculations, naivete or prejudice of other [UFO] publications."

=== The Flying Saucer Conspiracy ===
In 1955, Keyhoe authored The Flying Saucer Conspiracy, which pointedly accused elements of United States government of engaging in a conspiracy to cover up knowledge of flying saucers. Keyhoe alleged the existence of a "silence group" and claimed that it was orchestrating this conspiracy. Historian of folklore Curtis Peebles argues: "The Flying Saucer Conspiracy marked a shift in Keyhoe's belief system. No longer were flying saucers the central theme; that now belonged to the silence group and its coverup. For the next two decades Keyhoe's beliefs about this would dominate the flying saucer myth."

The book features claims of a possible discovery of an "orbiting space base" or a "Moon base", knowledge of which might trigger a public panic. The Flying Saucer Conspiracy also incorporated legends of the Bermuda Triangle disappearances. Keyhoe sensationalized claims, ultimately stemming from optical illusions, of unusual structures on the moon.

== The NICAP era ==
In 1956, Keyhoe cofounded the National Investigations Committee On Aerial Phenomena (NICAP). He was one of several prominent professional, military or scientific figures on the board of directors, which lent the group a degree of legitimacy many of the other contemporary "flying saucer clubs" sorely lacked. NICAP published a newsletter, The UFO Investigator, which was mailed to its members. Although the newsletter was intended to be published on a regular monthly basis, due to financial problems it was often delivered on a more erratic basis. For example, in 1958 four issues were published, but only two issues were published in 1959.

NICAP founder Thomas Townsend Brown was ousted as director in early 1957 after facing repeated charges of financial ineptitude. Keyhoe replaced him; he was only slightly better at managing NICAP's finances, and the organization often faced financial shortfalls and crises throughout Keyhoe's twelve years as director. Even so, it would remain the largest and most influential civilian UFO research group in the United States from the late 1950s to the late 1960s.

With Keyhoe in the lead, NICAP pressed hard for Congressional hearings and investigation into UFOs. They scored some attention from the mass media, and the general public (NICAP's membership peaked at about 15,000 during the early and mid-1960s) but only very limited interest from government officials.

However, there was increasing criticism of the Air Force's Project Blue Book. Following a widely publicized wave of UFO reports in 1966, NICAP was among the chorus which called for an independent scientific investigation of UFOs. The Condon Committee was formed at the University of Colorado with this goal in mind, though it quickly became mired in infighting and later, in controversy. Keyhoe publicized the so-called "Trick Memo", an embarrassing memorandum written by the Condon Committee coordinator which seemed to suggest that the ostensibly objective and neutral committee had determined to pursue a debunking operation well before even beginning their studies.

== Television appearances ==
On January 22, 1958, Keyhoe appeared on a CBS live television show the Armstrong Circle Theatre to speak on the topic of UFOs. Keyhoe charged that a U.S. Congressional committee was evaluating evidence that "will absolutely prove that the UFOs are machines under intelligent control".

Irve Tunick worked with Donald Keyhoe and the United States Air Force to both agree to appear for a live broadcast to discuss sightings of UFOs in an episode titled "U.F.O. — The Enigma of the Skies." The show aired live on January 22, 1958. Prior to the show, Tunick had been negotiating with Keyhoe and the Air Force regarding what could appear on the show even staying up until 4 am to negotiate the script. As negotiations wore on, Keyhoe becoming more frustrated as more information he was prepared to show was cut. Tunick apologetically explained that it was not his decision and that "the Armstrong Company won't stand for an open battle with the Air Force." Keyhoe reluctantly decided to continue with the appearance despite the changes in the script, but as he explains in his book, this frustration erupted during the live broadcast:

For several minutes, I forced myself to read the lines on the teleprompter. But as the yellow strip slowly unreeled, all the frustration of the past three days suddenly boiled over. I stopped, looked straight into the camera: "And now I'm going to reveal something that has never been disclosed before...." Back in the control room, as I learned later, there was instant bedlam. Caught without warning, [the producer Robert Costello] had to make a lightning decision. Should he cut off the air – or silence me and try to save it? Swiftly, he ordered my microphone switched off. But the camera was still on me. Unaware that I had been silenced, I went on: "For the last six months, we have been working with a Congressional committee investigating official secrecy about UFOs. If all the evidence we have given this committee is made public in open hearings . . ." Abruptly, the cameraman began to rack the teleprompter tape up and down, in a frantic signal for me to stop. Still not certain I was off the air, I finished the sentence: " . . . it will absolutely prove that the UFOs are real machines under intelligent control." Since Doug Edwards' mike was on, some listeners caught the last words by turning up their volume controls. But the majority did not, and within minutes CBS switchboards all over the country were being swamped with complaints. Why had the sound been cut off? What were the final words? In that one impulsive act, I seemed to have offset the Air Force claims more than anything I had said on the program.

Keyhoe being silenced while on a live broadcast led to conspiracy theories that the military had cut Keyhoe's mike during the episode. Keyhoe thought about indignantly going to the press to protest the censorship right after the incident but realized that such a move would also hurt Costello and Tunick who he also believed were "victims" of pressure from the government and so gave up the idea. Herbert A. Carlborg, CBS director of editing stated "this program had been carefully cleared for security reasons".

On March 8, 1958, Keyhoe appeared on The Mike Wallace Interview on ABC and spoke about flying saucers, contactees and the details of the Armstrong Circle Theatre censorship, which he blamed on the Air Force rather than CBS.

In 1967, Keyhoe appeared as himself on the May 23 episode of To Tell the Truth, receiving three of four possible votes.

Keyhoe was portrayed by actor Adam Greydon Reid in an episode of the television series Project Blue Book. In the episode, "The Lubbock Lights" (aired January 22, 2019), Keyhoe is a writer (spelled in the IMDb credits as "Donald Kehoe") who federal agents try to intimidate into clearing his UFO stories through them before publication.

== Later life ==
NICAP's membership plummeted in the late 1960s, and Keyhoe was blamed by critics within NICAP for the organization's decline. Some NICAP members accused him of incompetent handling of NICAP's finances and personnel, and of being too authoritarian in his leadership style. By July 1969 NICAP was facing bankruptcy, and Keyhoe was forced to lay off five of NICAP's nine staff members. Additionally, The UFO Investigator, the organization's newsletter, which was edited and published by Keyhoe, gradually moved from being delivered on a reliable monthly basis in the mid-1960s to an increasingly erratic and unreliable delivery schedule, which angered many NICAP subscribers. In 1969 Keyhoe turned his focus away from the military and focused on the CIA as the source of the UFO cover up. However, NICAP's Board of Governors, headed by Colonel Joseph Bryan III, investigated NICAP's finances and found that Social Security taxes had been withheld from employee's paychecks, but not reported to the government, and that some NICAP members had not paid their annual dues for years, but were still receiving copies of The UFO Investigator and enjoying full NICAP membership rights. In December 1969, in what was described as a "stormy meeting", the board forced Keyhoe to retire as NICAP chief. Colonel Bryan became the new director of NICAP. Under Bryan's leadership, NICAP disbanded its local and state affiliate groups, and by 1973 it had been completely closed.

In 1973, Keyhoe wrote his final book about UFOs, Aliens from Space. It promoted "Operation Lure", a plan to entice extraterrestrials to land on Earth, and described the problems Keyhoe had getting information from government agents.

Beyond this book, Keyhoe had little contact with ufology as he settled into retirement. However, he did speak at several UFO conferences after his ouster from NICAP. In 1981 he joined MUFON's board of directors, but his membership was essentially in name only because of his declining health, and he had little to do with the organization. Donald Keyhoe died in 1988 at the age of 91.

Several of Keyhoe's books are now in the public domain and are available online.

== Books ==
- Flying with Lindbergh, 2003 (reprint), Kessinger Publishing, ISBN 0-7661-4294-9
- The Flying Saucers Are Real (1950), 2006 (reprint), Cosimo Classics, ISBN 1-59605-877-3
- Flying Saucers from Outer Space (1953), Henry Holt and Company, NY
- The Flying Saucer Conspiracy, 1955, Henry Holt and Company, NY, ISBN 9781523928668
- Flying Saucers: Top Secret, 1960, G.P. Putnam & Sons, ASIN B000EB427C
- Aliens from Space: The Real Story of Unidentified Flying Objects, 1973, Signet Press, ASIN B000HYOMMG
- The Vanished Legion, 2011 (reprint), Age of Aces, ISBN 0-9820950-6-6
- Captain Philip Strange: Strange War, 2011 (reprint), Age of Aces, ISBN 0-9820950-8-2
- The Complete Adventures of Richard Knight Volume 1, 2011 (reprint), Altus Press, ISBN 1-6182700-7-9
- The Complete Adventures of Richard Knight Volume 2, 2017 (reprint), Altus Press,
- Captain Philip Strange: Strange Enemies, 2012 (reprint), Age of Aces, ISBN 0-9820950-9-0
- Captain Philip Strange: Strange Operators, 2014 (reprint), Age of Aces, ISBN 978-1-937590-02-4
- The Jailbird Flight: Dead Man's Drome, 2015 (reprint), Age of Aces, ISBN 978-1-937590-04-8
- Captain Philip Strange: Strange Staffels, 2015 (reprint), Age of Aces, ISBN 978-1937590055
- The Complete Adventures of Eric Trent, Volume 1, 2016 (reprint), Altus Press, ISBN 9781618272829
- Captain Philip Strange: Strange Spectres, 2016 (reprint), Age of Aces, ISBN 978-1-937590-08-6
- Captain Philip Strange: Strange Hell, 2017 (reprint), Age of Aces, ISBN 978-1937590109
- Captain Philip Strange: Strange Squadrons, 2018 (reprint), Age of Aces, ISBN 978-1937590130
- The Jailbird Flight: The Devil Flies High, 2018 (reprint), Age of Aces, ISBN 978-1937590116
- Captain Philip Strange: Strange Deaths, 2019 (reprint), Age of Aces, ISBN 978-1937590147
- Captain Philip Strange: Strange Rivals, 2021 (reprint), Age of Aces, ISBN 978-1937590161
- Devildog Squadron: The Crimson Fog, v1 2022 (reprint), Age of Aces
- Devildog Squadron: The Flying Juggernaut, v2 2023 (reprint), Age of Aces
- The Complete Adventures of Eric Trent, Volume 2, 2023 (reprint), Altus Press

== Bibliography ==
- Keyhoe, Donald E. (1960). Flying Saucers: Top Secret. New York: G.P. Putnam's Sons. OCLC 5527262.
- Curtis Peebles, Watch the Skies: A Chronicle of the Flying Saucer Myth; New York: Berkley Books, 1995.
