= Jim Jidhed =

- Born: 23 February 1963 (age 63); Gothenburg, Sweden
- Occupations: singer

Jim Jidhed (born February 23, 1963), sometimes known as Jim Willy Jidhed, is a Swedish rock singer. Jidhed's first major break was as the lead singer for the rock band Alien in the late 1980s with the ballad "Only One Woman". After that he released his first solo album called Jim, which included the cover songs "Wild Young And Free", "Silence is Golden", "Don't Lose Any Sleep" and "Love Hurts". Jidhed participated in Melodifestivalen in 1991 with "Kommer du ihåg mig?", finishing 3rd, and in 1997 where he performed "Charlie", finishing 10th.

In 2003, Jidhed released an album entitled Full Circle. In 2007 he released "Reflektioner", his first Swedish language album in 16 years. During 2008 Jidhed re-released the album "Jim" through the MTM label. As a songwriter on Tove Jaarnek's album "Sound of Romance" he reached the Svensktoppen with the song "I’ve Been Touched by You".

== Discography ==
=== Studio albums ===
List of albums, with selected chart positions
Title	Album details	Peak chart positions
Title	Album details	SE
Jim	Released: 1990; Label: Virgin	—
Snart kommer natten	Released: 1991; Label: Virgin	48
Full Circle	Released: 2003; Label: Atenzia	—
Reflektioner	Released: 2007; Label: Imse Music/CMC	—
Tankar i Vinternatt	Released: 2015; Label: Imse Music	—
Push On Through	Released: 2017; Label: AOR Heaven	—
"—" denotes items that did not chart or were not released.

=== with Glamour ===
- Jag Vill Dansa, Natten Är Ung (1982)

=== with Alien ===
- Alien (1988)
- Dark Eyes (2005)
- Eternity (2014)
- Into the Future (2020)
- Yesterday Comes (2025)

=== Singles ===
- "Only One Woman" (1988)
- "Go Easy" (1988)
- "Wild Young and Free" (1990)
- "Snart Kommer Natten" (1991)
- "Kommer du ihåg mig?" (1991)
- "Charlie" (1997)
- "För Alltid" (2006)
- "Du är min värld" (2007)
- "Det känns som förra sommaren" (2007)

=== Independent singles ===
- "Woman Is the Hunter" (1988)
- "Love Spins" (1991)
- "Blue, Blue, Blue Village" (1997)
- "Blåvitt, blåvitt" (1997)
- "The Rose" (1998)

== Reviews ==
- review of Full Circle at Melodic.net
- review of Full Circle at RockUnited.com
- review of Full Circle by Alberto Bertamino
