= P. R. Krishna Kumar =

Indian Ayurveda expert (1951–2020)

- Born: 23 September 1951; Shoranur, Kerala, India
- Died: 16 September 2020 (aged 68); Coimbatore, Tamil Nadu, India
- Occupation: Ayurveda expert
- Known for: AVP Research Foundation
- Awards: Padma Shri; Dhanvantari Puraskar
- Website: Arya Vaidya Pharmacy

P. R. Krishna Kumar (23 September 1951 – 16 September 2020) was an Indian Ayurveda expert and managing director of The Arya Vaidya Pharmacy (Coimbatore) Ltd. He established The Ayurvedic Trust, overseeing AVCRI (The Arya Vaidya Chikitsalayam and Research Institute) and AVP Research Foundation, a non-profit organisation promoting research in the Ayurveda. He was the chancellor of the Avinashilingam University, and the chairman of CARe Keralam (Confederation for Ayurvedic Renaissance – Keralam), a resource centre involved in efforts to standardise Ayurvedic medicines. The Government of India awarded him the fourth-highest civilian honour of the Padma Shri, in 2009, for his contributions to Ayurveda.

== Early life ==
Krishna Kumar was born on 23 September 1951 in a family of Ayurvedic practitioners in Shoranur, Palakkad district, in the south Indian state of Kerala, to Pankajam and Aryavaidyan P.V. Rama Varier, an ayurvedic physician and the founder of the Arya Vaidya Pharmacy. His formal education in ayurveda was at the Shoranur Ayurveda College, in Shoranur, Palakkad.

== Career ==
Kumar joined the Arya Vaidya Pharmacy after completing his education, and was involved in the study of Ayurveda through his work at the foundation.

In 1977, he conceived and implemented a seven and a half year curriculum for Ayurvedic studies, first affiliated to the University of Madras and later to the Bharathiar University. The course introduced Ayurvedic studies along with components of spiritual practices, traditional martial arts, and was set in a gurukula-based living arrangement. The curriculum came to be known in academic circles as the "Coimbatore Experiment". In the same year, he initiated the first ever clinical research to study the efficacy of Ayurvedic medicines for rheumatoid arthritis, in a joint study with the World Health Organization and the Indian Council of Medical Research.

Kumar implemented projects for the Government of India's Department of Science and Technology and Department of Environment linked to ayurveda and traditional land use, including execution of the All India Coordinated Project on Ethnobiology of Tribals in the Western Ghats between 1985 and 1988.

In 2003, Kumar founded the AVT Institute for Advanced Research', later renamed the AVP Research Foundation, to promote scientific research in ayurveda. The foundation initiated several research programs which included a study, funded jointly with the National Institutes of Health, and conducted by the University of Washington, Seattle, and the University of California Los Angeles, California, to ascertain the efficacy of ayurvedic medicines in the treatment of rheumatoid arthritis. In the same year, the foundation also launched a clinical documentation program, called RUDRA, to promote practice-based evidence in Ayurveda.

He founded the DIVYAM Academy as a centre for holistic value-based education for children. He was also known to have contributed in conceptualizing and implementing the preparation of ayurvedic medicines in tablet form and conducted several free medical camps for the poor in rural areas. The Government of India honoured him with the civilian award of the Padma Shri in 2009. He was also chairman of the Confederation for Ayurvedic Renaissance (CARe) in Kerala.

During the beginning of the COVID-19 pandemic in India, the Indian Prime Minister Narendra Modi held a video conference with Kumar to discuss the prospects of Ayurveda to manage COVID-19.

== Illness and death ==
Kumar had a below knee amputation of his right leg due to a diabetic foot ulcer.

After he contracted COVID-19 during the COVID-19 pandemic in India, Kumar was admitted for medical treatment at a private hospital in Coimbatore for over a week. He died on 16 September 2020, seven days short of his 69th birthday.

== Honours ==
- Padma Shri, Government of India (2009)
- Dhanvantari Puraskar, Government of India (2016)

Kumar was also a recipient of an honorary doctoral degree from the Kuvempu University.

== See also ==
- AVP Research Foundation
