= UFO (disambiguation) =

UFO, or unidentified flying object, is an unusual apparent anomaly in the sky that is not readily identifiable.

UFO, ufo, or Ufo may also refer to:

== Technology ==
- .ufo, the file extension for Ulead PhotoImpact documents
- Unified File and Object (UFO), an object storage architecture
- UHF Follow-On satellite, a series of U.S. military communications satellites
- Unified Font Object, an XML-based future proof open format for digital fonts
- Unified Foundational Ontology, an upper ontology for conceptual modelling purposes

== Arts, entertainment and media ==
=== Film and television ===
- UFO (1956 film), directed by Winston Jones
- U.F.O. (1993 film), starring Roy "Chubby" Brown
- U.F.O. (2012 film), starring Jean-Claude Van Damme
- UFO (2018 film), directed by Ryan Eslinger, starring Alex Sharp and Gillian Anderson
- UFO (2022 film), a Turkish Netflix film
- UFO (American TV series), a 2021 television documentary by J. J. Abrams
- UFO (British TV series), a 1970s TV series by Gerry Anderson
- UFOs (TV series), a 2021 French TV series
- UFO Ultramaiden Valkyrie, a 2000s manga and anime television series

=== Music ===
==== Bands and performers ====
- UFO (musician) (born 1981), a Danish hip hop artist, rapper and singer
- UFO (band), an English hard rock band
- UFO, the original name of the English R&B group also known as JLS
- Ufo361 (born 1988), a German rapper
- UFO Yepha, a Danish hip hop duo
- The Unidentified Flying Objects, an American rock band
- United Future Organization, a Japanese jazz duo

==== Albums ====
- U.F.O. (album), by Jim Sullivan, 1969
- UFO, by Newton Faulkner
- UFO EP, by Torch
- UFO 1, by UFO, 1970

==== Songs ====
- "U.F.O." (Coldplay song), 2011
- "UFO" (Mallrat song featuring Allday), 2018
- "UFO" (Pink Lady song), 1977
- "UFO" (Sneaky Sound System song), 2007
- "UFO" (Vigiland song), 2014
- "U.F.O.", by Blonde Redhead from La Mia Vita Violenta, 1995
- "UFO", by Cupcakke from The Bakkery, 2025
- "UFO", by D-Block Europe and Aitch from The Blue Print: Us vs. Them, 2020
- "UFO", by ESG from ESG, 1981

==== Other uses in music ====
- UFO (Daugherty), a composition by Michael Daugherty
- UFOetry, a multimedia UFO rock opera

=== Video games ===
- UFO Interactive Games, an American video game company

==== UFO Defense family ====
- UFO: Enemy Unknown, also known as X-COM: UFO Defense, 1994
- UFO: Aftermath, 2003
- UFO: Aftershock, 2005
- UFO: Afterlight, 2007
- UFO: Alien Invasion, 2003

==== Other video games ====
- UFO!, for the Magnavox Odyssey², 1981
- UFO (video game), by Sublogic, 1989
- UFO Kamen Yakisoban, for the Super Famicom, 1994
- U.F.O.s (video game), an adventure game by Artech, 1997
- UFO: A Day in the Life, by Love-de-Lic, 1999
- UFO: Extraterrestrials, by Chaos Concept, 2007
- Undefined Fantastic Object, the twelfth entry in the Touhou Project series by ZUN, 2009

=== Other uses in arts, entertainment and media ===
- UFOs: The Greatest Stories, a 1996 short-story anthology by Martin H. Greenberg
- U-Foes, a Marvel Comics supervillain team

== Games and sports ==
- UFO, also known as a claw vending machine
- UFO, a style of delivery in tenpin bowling

== Clubs ==
- Ufo (club, Berlin), an acid house club
- UFO Club, a London underground club

== Products and services ==
- UFO, a brand of instant yakisoba
- UFO (restaurant), in Slovakia
- UFO (ride), an amusement park ride
- Jonway UFO, a Chinese compact crossover SUV

== Other uses ==
- United Farmers of Ontario, a Canadian political party, c. 1920s
- UFO, a variant of float b-boy move
- Ufo (wasp), a genus of wasps
- UFO 34 (yacht), a sailboat
- UFO Radio, a radio station in Taiwan
- Uranium fluorine oxygen, also known as uranyl fluoride
- Ultra fast outflows, winds that come from supermassive black holes
- University of French Ontario, also known as Université de l'Ontario français
- Bob Della Serra (born 1951), a Canadian pro-wrestler with the ring names "The UFO", and as part of the "UFO" tag team, "UFO #1"
- Rocky Della Serra (born 1958), a Canadian pro-wrestler with the tag team wrestling ring name "UFO #2" as part of the "UFO" tag team

== See also ==
- Unidentified flying object (disambiguation)
- Flying saucer (disambiguation)
