= Superpredator (disambiguation) =

A superpredator was a proposed type of criminal, the idea of which became popular in the United States in the 1990s.

Superpredator, superpredators, or super predator may also refer to:

- Apex predator, a predator animal at the top of a food chain
- "Superpredators (Metal Postcard)", the third track from the 1997 film soundtrack The Jackal
- "Super Predator", a song by Joey Badass from All-Amerikkkan Badass

== See also ==
- Predator (disambiguation)
