= Kissinger-Crookes Flying Saucer =

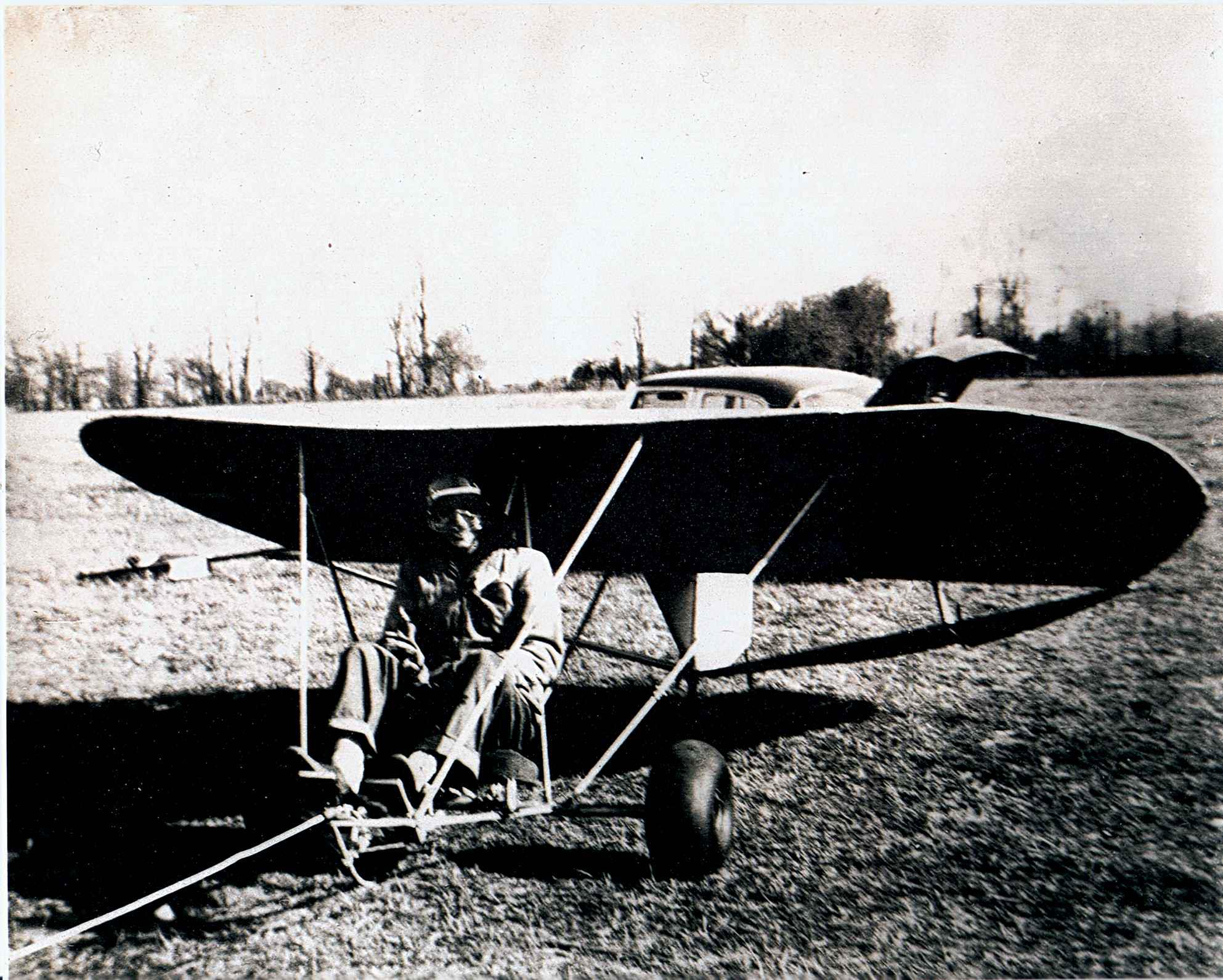

General information
- Type: Homebuilt aircraft
- National origin: United States of America
- Designer: Curtiss Kissinger, LeRoy Crookes

The Kissinger-Crookes Flying Saucer is a high-wing homebuilt glider based on the Amcraft Products model aircraft.

== Design and development ==
The Flying Saucer is the first in a series of aircraft designs from Curtiss Kissinger, and LeRoy Crookes capable of carrying a pilot. It received a Patent No. 2,864,567.

The prototype was built using EMT electrical conduit. The wings use pine wood spars, and 1/8 inch plywood covering. The wing chord varies from center to tip to form a circular shape. The wings fold in segments for road travel.

== Operational history ==
The flying saucer was towed aloft on flight tests with a Nash Rambler. The prototype suffered structural damage on the first flight tests.

== Specifications (Kissinger-Crookes Flying Saucer) ==
Data from Sport Aviation

General characteristics

- Capacity: 1
- Length: 14 ft (4.3 m)
- Wingspan: 11 ft (3.4 m)
- Height: 4 ft 6 in (1.37 m)
- Wing area: 123 sq ft (11.4 m^{2})
- Empty weight: 210 lb (95 kg)

Performance

- Stall speed: 30 kn (35 mph, 56 km/h)
