= Unidentified flying object (disambiguation) =

Unidentified flying object, a perceived aerial phenomenon that cannot be immediately identified or explained.

Unidentified flying object or variations may also refer to:

== Music ==
- UFO 1, a 1980 album by British rock band UFO, reissued as Unidentified Flying Object
- The Unidentified Flying Object, a 1966 electronica song by Perrey and Kingsley
- (The Notes) Unidentified Flying Objects, a 2013 jazz song by Wayne Shorter from his album Without a Net
- The Unidentified Flying Objects, a US rock band led by Lisa Kindred

== See also ==
- Unidentified submerged object
- Alien spaceship
- UFO (disambiguation)
- Flying saucer (disambiguation)
