= Aliens (soundtrack) =

Aliens: Original Motion Picture Soundtrack

Soundtrack album by James Horner
- Released: October 25, 1987
- Studios: Abbey Road Studios, London, UK
- Genre: Soundtrack
- Length: 39:57
- Label: Varèse Sarabande
- Producer: James Horner

Alternative cover
- Cover of the Deluxe Edition

Professional ratings
Review scores
Source	Rating
Allmusic	2.5/5 stars
Filmtracks	(Original)
Filmtracks	(Deluxe)
MovieMusicUK	(Deluxe)

Aliens: Original Motion Picture Soundtrack is the soundtrack album for the 1986 James Cameron film Aliens. The score was composed and conducted by James Horner, performed by the London Symphony Orchestra and recorded at Abbey Road Studios in London.

The film was the first of Cameron and Horner's three collaborations, though they were already acquaintances from their time at Roger Corman's New World Studios in the early 80s, where both men had started their careers.

== Disputes ==
The production of Aliens fell behind schedule in post-production, leaving Horner less than two weeks to write the score to the finished film, rather than the six weeks he had initially been promised. The producers were unwilling to give him any more time, and he was booked to begin scoring The Name of the Rose (1986) shortly afterwards. Aliens was Horner and Cameron's first collaboration; Horner called it a "nightmare".

Horner's schedule was so tight that the music for the climactic battle between Ripley and the queen was written overnight. Cameron first heard the score while it was being recorded by the orchestra and did not like it, but it was too late to make changes. Brad Fiedel's synth-inspired tracks for The Terminator had allowed changes to be made quickly based on feedback, but Cameron had no experience managing orchestral music. Cameron cut the score up, using pieces where he believed they fit best, and inserted pieces of Jerry Goldsmith's Alien score and hired unknown composers to fill gaps. Cameron said in a later interview he thought the music was good, but did not fit the scenes he had filmed.

Horner's "alien sting" sound was initially used only once, during the scene with the cocooned woman, as Cameron disliked it, but he eventually used it throughout the film. Unused portions of Horner's Aliens score were repurposed for Die Hard (1988).

Despite the lack of time, Cameron and producer Gale Ann Hurd requested frequent changes to the music and made last-minute changes to the film's edit, which forced Horner to re-write the music. The combination of a lack of time and constant changes resulted in a falling-out between Horner and Cameron, who did not work together again until Titanic more than a decade later. Despite the difficulties during the score's production, it was nominated for an Academy Award in 1986. The soundtrack album was released the following year, in 1987.

== Style ==
The score features some of Horner's most complex and modernistic writing, making widespread use of dissonance, aleatoric and extended orchestral techniques and sound design. Horner also used tape delays to create "echoes" on some separately-recorded orchestral parts, a technique Jerry Goldsmith had used in the original Alien score.

It also includes musical references to Gayane's Adagio from Aram Khachaturian's Gayane ballet suite, which had been used in Stanley Kubrick's 2001: A Space Odyssey (1968).

== Reception ==
Jonathan Broxton of Movie Music UK described Aliens as one of Horner's defining early scores and a landmark of the science fiction and action genres. He praised its innovative use of eerie orchestral textures, relentless percussion and complex action writing, arguing that it influenced numerous later science fiction and horror scores. Although he acknowledged that its abrasive and highly dynamic sound made it a challenging standalone listening experience, Broxton commended its intelligence, construction and dramatic development, concluding that the expanded chronological release was the definitive presentation of a score he considered a bona fide classic and fully deserving of its Academy Award nomination.

Christian Clemmensen of Filmtracks described Aliens as a transitional work in James Horner's career, marking the end of his early compositional style before the more melodic approach of Willow and The Rocketeer. He recounted the difficult production of the score, noting that director James Cameron extensively edited, relocated and replaced much of Horner's music during post-production, contributing to a long-standing rift between the two that was not resolved until their collaboration on Titanic. Clemmensen considered the score highly effective within the film but criticised its heavy reliance on Horner's earlier musical ideas, particularly from Star Trek II: The Wrath of Khan, Star Trek III: The Search for Spock and Brainstorm, arguing that it lacked a strong overarching theme and was dominated by atmospheric suspense passages punctuated by aggressive brass and percussion. While he praised the score's militaristic action cues, especially "Futile Escape", "Going After Newt" and "Bishop's Countdown", he regarded much of the remaining music as ambient underscore that made for a difficult standalone listening experience. Clemmensen nevertheless commended the expanded 2001 Varèse Sarabande Deluxe Edition for restoring Horner's intended presentation of the score, concluding that it represented the definitive release of an important, Academy Award-nominated work despite its artistic shortcomings.

== Track listing ==
=== Original track listing ===
1. "Main Title" (5:10)
2. "Going After Newt" (3:08)
3. "Sub-Level 3" (6:11)
4. "Ripley's Rescue" (3:13)
5. "Atmosphere Station" (3:05)
6. "Futile Escape" (8:13)
7. "Dark Discovery" (2:00)
8. "Bishop's Countdown" (2:47)
9. "Resolution and Hyperspace" (6:10)

=== Deluxe edition track listing ===
1. "Main Title" (5:13)
2. "Bad Dreams" (1:22)
3. "Dark Discovery/Newt's Horror" (2:07)
4. "LV-426" (2:03)
5. "Combat Drop" (3:29)
6. "The Complex" (1:34)
7. "Atmosphere Station" (3:11)
8. "Med.Lab." (2:04)
9. "Newt" (1:14)
10. "Sub-Level 3" (6:36)
11. "Ripley's Rescue" (3:19)
12. "FaceHuggers" (4:24)
13. "Futile Escape" (8:29)
14. "Newt is Taken" (2:04)
15. "Going After Newt" (3:18)
16. "The Queen" (1:45)
17. "Bishop's Countdown" (2:50)
18. "Queen To Bishop" (2:31)
19. "Resolution and Hyperspace" (6:27)

Bonus Tracks

1. "Bad Dreams" (alternate) (1:23)
2. "Ripley's Rescue" (percussion only) (3:20)
3. "LV-426" (alternate edit – film version) (1:13)
4. "Combat Drop" (percussion only) (3:24)
5. "Hyperspace" (alternate ending) (2:08)

== Personnel ==
- Edited By [Music] – Michael Clifford (2), Robin Clark (3)
- Executive-Producer – Richard Kraft, Tom Null
- Mixed By [Music Scoring Mixer] – Eric Arthur Tomlinson
- Orchestra – London Symphony Orchestra
- Orchestrated By – Greig McRitchie
- Producer, Conductor, Composed By – James Horner

℗ © 1986 Twentieth Century Fox Film Corp.

== Uses in other films and trailers ==
The music for Aliens has been widely used in other media - there were reportedly 24 different film trailers that used "Bishop's Countdown" alone. Some of movie trailers include Misery (1990), Alien 3 (1992), Timecop (1994), From Dusk Til Dawn (1996), Broken Arrow (1996), Dante's Peak (1997), Lake Placid (1999), Minority Report (2002), and The Hitchhiker's Guide To The Galaxy (2005).

The first 90 seconds of "Resolution and Hyperspace" (which was replaced by a repeat of "Bishop's Countdown" in the finished film) was later tracked onto the ending of Die Hard (1988).

The music was also used in the Harry Potter and The Chamber of Secrets (2002) parody by French and Saunders during the Quidditch match.
