= Predator X (disambiguation) =

Predator X is a pliosaur assigned to Pliosaurus funkei.

Predator X may also refer to:

- Predator X (character), a character from X-Men
- Predator X (TV program), a television special on History
- "Predator X", a song by King Gizzard & the Lizard Wizard from Omnium Gatherum
