= Flying Saucers from Outer Space =

Book by Donald Keyhoe

- Front cover
- Author: Donald Keyhoe
- Subject: Flying Saucers
- Publisher: Henry Holt
- Publication date: October 5, 1953
- Preceded by: The Flying Saucers Are Real (1950)
- Followed by: The Flying Saucer Conspiracy (1955)

Flying Saucers from Outer Space is a non-fiction book published in 1953 by Donald Keyhoe about unidentified flying objects (UFOs).

== Adaptation ==
In 1956 a science-fiction film credited as "suggested by" the book was made under the title Earth vs. the Flying Saucers, also known as Invasion of the Flying Saucers. (Note: Screen credits for Earth vs. the Flying Saucers are: screen play by George Worthing Yates and Raymond T. Marcus, screen story by Curt Siodmak, suggested by "Flying Saucers From Outer Space" by Major Donald E. Keyhoe. Keyhoe's descriptions of UFO reports and Air Force investigations were used to give a realistic background to a fictional story. Keyhoe's recounts of descriptions of UFOs with a stationary central cabin and rotating slotted outer disk inspired the design of the saucers in the movie.) The working titles of the film were Attack of the Flying Saucers, Invasion of the Flying Saucers and Flying Saucers from Outer Space. In a letter contained in the film's production file at the AMPAS Library, blacklisted screenwriter Bernard Gordon stated that he wrote the screenplay for this picture using the pseudonym Raymond T. Marcus.

== See also ==
- The Flying Saucers Are Real (1950)
- The Flying Saucer Conspiracy (1955)
