= The Rocketeer (soundtrack) =

1991 film soundtrack

Soundtrack album by James Horner
- Released: June 10, 1991
- Recorded: 1990–91
- Genre: Film soundtrack
- Length: 57:18
- Label: Hollywood
- Producer: James Horner

James Horner chronology
Class Action (1991)	The Rocketeer (1991)	An American Tail: Fievel Goes West (1991)

The Rocketeer: Original Motion Picture Soundtrack is the soundtrack album composed by James Horner for the 1991 film of the same name directed by Joe Johnston. The original score was released by Hollywood Records on June 10, 1991, which includes much of Horner's score and two cover songs — "Begin the Beguine" (1935) and "When Your Lover Has Gone" (1931) — all of them were performed by Melora Hardin and arranged by Billy May. Upon release, the album was issued in multiple physical formats.

The album was then re-issued by Intrada Records, which released a full score album on June 24, 2016. It is a two-disc CD set that contained the score from the initial tracklist (including the two songs), and additional material of the score used in the film. It was remastered and re-released on May 28, 2021. The score received critical praise from music critics, praising the nostalgic moments and heroic themes. It was often regarded as one of Horner's best film scores in his career, and also considered as one of the best scores for a superhero film.

== Reception ==
The soundtrack received positive response from critics, being considered as one of the film's positive aspects. Some also praised it as "one of Horner's best scores", with Den of Geek (Sean Wilson) and Comingsoon.net (Jeff Ames) also referring them in their list. Ames also mentioned the Rocketeer score as one of "the top 10 superhero scores of all time". Wilson felt that "Joe Johnston's underrated comic book adventure soars off the back of Horner's spectacular score, what with its quintessentially heroic main theme calling back to the Golden Age of Hollywood, swooning romantic material and bombastic action sequences. More important than anything, however, is the score's sense of fun: Horner really did capture the exhilaration of flight quite beautifully, making one lament the dreary audio nonsense allowed to clutter so many movies in the current age."

Post Horner's death on June 22, 2015, The Hollywood Reporter writer Harry Windsor praised the work as "nostalgic but full of youthful wonder for a time when modern aviation and modern movies were coming into being", which paved the way for Horner's success as a film composer, and referred it to "grandly romantic as anything by John Williams".

=== Critical response ===
Peter Fawthrop, writing for the online music website AllMusic, summarised "Most of the Rocketeer soundtrack elicits the adventure and lifting spirit of the film and reveals how Horner incorporates rich instrumentals in the tiniest crevices. Even when the film involves danger, as in "Jenny's Rescue," the composer takes care when it is hardly even required. Instead of some "duh-duh-duhs," he brings on a full, stunning orchestra and when he overdoes it, it is in a jolly way – he never exhausts his medium. That is what separates him from inferior composers, and what makes a nice film like The Rocketeer extra nice"; calling the soundtrack as "worth to listen". Music critic Jonathan Broxton, wrote "Listening to scores like The Rocketeer in this context is bittersweet, because the brilliance of it only reminds us of what was taken from us far too soon. This score is a masterpiece, one of his absolute career best, and one which only gets better with age, especially as new ways of scoring super-hero movies emerge, and scores like this one are dismissed as 'old fashioned' and 'corny' by some contemporary audiences."

James Southall of Movie Wave wrote "The Rocketeer has always been a fan favourite and there's no mystery as to why – it's big-hearted, built around one magnificent theme and several other excellent ones, unabashedly romantic and continually satisfying. Few would hesitate to put it up as one of James Horner's most wonderful film scores. This is one of those film scores where it's very hard to think of a single bad thing to say – it's so enthusiastic and positive but at the same time musically impeccable. It's a knockout." Filmtracks.com wrote "critics often lump The Rocketeer in with Willow and The Land Before Time as simple, adventuresome children's music of significant orchestral volume. But there is one major difference between The Rocketeer and those other efforts. This movie's character is a larger-than-life comic hero and therefore falls under a different classification of fantasy. Horner appropriately bloats every element of his score to create the needed level of bright fantasy; the major key is brutalized, the brass play a little louder, the strings perform themes at a slower tempo, and the percussion section is absolutely exhausted of every metallic resource imaginable. Together, part of The Rocketeer seems slightly exaggerated, and that is the key to its success."

Reviewing the 2020 remastered edition, Zanobard Reviews called it as "utterly magical" and "one of Horner's best". He further added "The main theme quite literally soars across the album, and you can really hear the composer's love for flying throughout its various wonderful presentations. The secondary love and villain motifs are also great, with the former receiving a particularly enjoyable (and happily lengthy) cue of its own in Love Theme. The action sequences are superbly crafted – see The Flying Circus for absolute proof of just how talented a composer Horner was."

== Track listing ==
=== Original release ===
No.	Title	Length
1.	"Main Title / Takeoff"	4:45
2.	"The Flying Circus"	6:26
3.	"Jenny"	5:14
4.	"Begin the Beguine" (Melora Hardin)	3:46
5.	"Neville Sinclair's House"	7:24
6.	"Jenny's Rescue"	3:24
7.	"Rendezvous at Griffith Park Observatory"	8:14
8.	"When Your Lover Has Gone" (Melora Hardin)	3:30
9.	"The Zeppelin"	7:59
10.	"Rocketeer to the Rescue / End Title"	6:36
Total length:		57:18

=== Expanded edition ===
Disc 1
No.	Title	Length
1.	"Main Title"	4:43
2.	"The Gizmo"	3:25
3.	"Finding The Rocket"	1:52
4.	"Neville And Eddie"	1:07
5.	"Testing The Rocket"	2:40
6.	"Lothar Gets Wilmer"	1:44
7.	"The Helmet"	0:45
8.	"The Laughing Bandit"	1:10
9.	"Neville Eavesdrops"	1:25
10.	"The Flying Circus"	6:35
11.	"A Hero Is Born / Bye Bye Bigelow"	2:51
12.	"Begin The Beguine"	3:44
13.	"Jenny's Rescue"	3:52
14.	"Love Theme" (not featured in film)	5:10
15.	"Cliff To The Club"	0:49
16.	"Cliff The Waiter"	0:32
17.	"When Your Lover Has Gone"	3:28
18.	"South Seas Send Up"	3:43
19.	"Neville Sinclair's House"	7:19
20.	"Cliff Caught"	1:38
21.	"Rendezvous At Observatory"	8:10
Total length:		66:42

Disc 2
No.	Title	Length
1.	"The Zeppelin"	7:56
2.	"End Title / End Credits"	6:30
3.	"Main Title / Takeoff"	4:43
4.	"The Flying Circus"	6:23
5.	"Jenny" (not featured in film)	5:10
6.	"Begin The Beguine" (Melora Hardin)	3:44
7.	"Neville Sinclair's House"	7:20
8.	"Jenny's Rescue"	3:21
9.	"Rendezvous At The Griffith Park Observatory"	8:10
10.	"When Your Lover Has Gone" (Melora Hardin)	3:28
11.	"The Zeppelin"	7:56
12.	"Rocketeer To The Rescue/End Title"	6:30
Total length:		71:11

== Personnel ==
Credits adapted from CD liner notes.

- Composer and producer – James Horner
- Mastering – Joe Tarantino, Dave Collins, Douglass Fake
- Mixing – Shawn Murphy
- Music editing – Douglass Fake, Jim Henrikson, Shawn Murphy, Joe E. Rand
- Assistant engineer – Sharon Rice, Susan McLean
- Technical engineer – Bill Talbott
- Executive producer – Roger Feigelson
- Production manager – Regina Fake
- Music consultant – Randy Thornton
- Music preparation – Jo Ann Kane
- Copyist – Aime M. Vereecke, Arthur D. Richards, Barbara A. Nahlik, Conrad M. Pope, Cynthia Ann Turner, David A. Izzard, Deborah S. Mitchell Jones, Douglas F. Dana, F. E. Scott Harris, Howard J. Segurson, James F. Hoffman, Jo Ann Kane, Karen Marie Smith, Katherine Fields, Kenneth W. Mitchell, Larry Kenton, Margaret J. Maryatt, Marty Krystall, Philip W. Azelton, Ralph R. Fera, Robert G. Skinnell, Robert M. Calderwood, Roberta McIntosh, Ronald F. Gorow, Russell W. Bartmus, Steven Lee Smith*, Stuart Balcomb, Terence A. Bonnell, Thomas G. Brown, Vince Bartold, Wayne J. Coster, Wendy L. Hall

Instruments

- Bass – Arni Egilsson, Bruce P. Morgenthaler, David Young, Drew D. Dembowski, Edward Meares, Nico C. Abondolo, Richard Feves, Susan A. Ranney, Timothy C. Barr
- Bassoon – Charles Koster, Kenneth E. Munday, Michael R. O'Donovan, Patricia Kindel-Heimerl, Rose Corrigan
- Cello – J. Antony Cooke, Armand Kaproff, Barbara Jane Hunter, Dane R. Little, David Low, David Shamban, Dennis Karmazyn, Douglas L. Davis, John A. Walz, Judith Perett, Nancy Stein-Ross, Nils Oliver, Robert L. Adcock, Stephen P. Erdody
- Clarinet – Emily Bernstein, Gary G. Gray, James M. Kanter, John Neufeld, Jon C. Clarke, Ralph Williams, Ronald Langinger
- Flute – James R. Walker, Louise M. DiTullio, Sheridon W. Stokes, Susan Greenberg
- French Horn – Brian D. A. O'Connor, David A. Duke, James W. Thatcher, John A. Reynolds, Mark L. Adams, Phillip E. Yao, Richard J. Todd, Steven B. Becknell, Todd L. Miller
- Guitar – Timothy J. May
- Harp – Ann Stockton, Dorothy Remsen, Gayle Levant, Katie Kirkpatrick
- Keyboards – Ian R. Underwood, Ralph E. Grierson
- Oboe – Barbara Northcutt, Kathleen T. Robinson
- Percussion – Robert J. Zimmitti, Dale L. Anderson, Donald J. Williams, Larry Bunker, Peter Limonick, Thomas D. Raney
- Trombone – Robert F. Sanders, Richard Nash, Ira Nepus, Lloyd E. Ulyate
- Trumpet – George Burnette Dillon, Malcolm McNab, Mario Guarneri, Roy L. Poper, Warren H. Luening, Jr.
- Tuba – Douglas W. Tornquist, James M. Self
- Viola – Alan DeVeritch, Brian Dembow, Carole Kleister-Castillo, Carrie Holzman-Little, Dan Lionel Neufeld, Denyse N. Buffum, Donald McInnes, Elizabeth S. Wilson, Harry Shirinian, Janet Lakatos, Ken Burward-Hoy, Marlow G. Fisher, Michael Nowak, Mihail Zinovyev, Myra Kestenbaum, Nancy K. Roth*, Pamela Goldsmith, Raymond J. Tischer III*, Robert L. Becker, Roland Kato, Valerie D. Dimond, Victoria E. Miskolczy
- Violin – Anatoly Rosinsky, Armen Garabedian, Arnold Belnick, Berj Garabedian, Bill T. Hybel, Blanche Belnick, Bonnie J. Douglas, Bruce Dukov, Carolyn Osborn, Clayton Haslop, Connie Kupka Speltz, David Frisina, Dorothy Wade, Gwen R. Heller, Haim Shtrum, Harold Wolf, Harris Goldman, Helen Nightengale, Igor Kiskatchi, Irma Neumann, Jacqueline L. Brand, Jennifer S. Woodward Munday, Julie Ann Gigante, Karen Jones, Katia K. Popov, Kenneth Yerke, Lily Ho Chen, Lisa M. Sutton Johnson, Margaret Batjer, Michael B. Markman, Miwako Watanabe, Norma Leonard, Paul C. Shure, Polly H. Sweeney, Ralph Morrison III, Razdan Kuyumjian, Rene M. Mandel, Robert L. Brosseau, Roger D. Wilkie, Roman Volodarsky, Ronald Folsom, Russ Cantor, Sheldon Sanov, Stanley Plummer, Stuart Canin, Tamara L. Hatwan-Chang*, Yoko Matsuda

Orchestra

- Conductor – James Horner
- Contractor – Nathan Kaproff
- Orchestration – Elliot Kaplan, John Neufeld
- Additional orchestration – Billy May, Conrad Pope
- Stage manager – Ethan Chase, Greg Dennen
- Orchestra manager – Reggie Wilson, Regnal Hall

Artwork

- Art direction – Maria De Grassi-Colosimo
- Design – Joe Sikoryak, Jamile G. Mafi
- Graphic design – Kay Marshall
- Liner notes – Douglass Fake, Tim Greiving
- Photography – Ron Batzdorff
- Booklet editor – Frank K. DeWald

== Chart performance ==
=== Weekly charts ===
Chart (1991–92)	Peak position
US Soundtrack Albums (Billboard)	9
