= Alien Project =

Alien Project may refer to:

- Alien Project (musician), the stage name of Israeli trance music producer Ari Linker, active since 1994
- Alien Project, a short-lived project of Steve Perry formed in 1977
