= UFOetry =

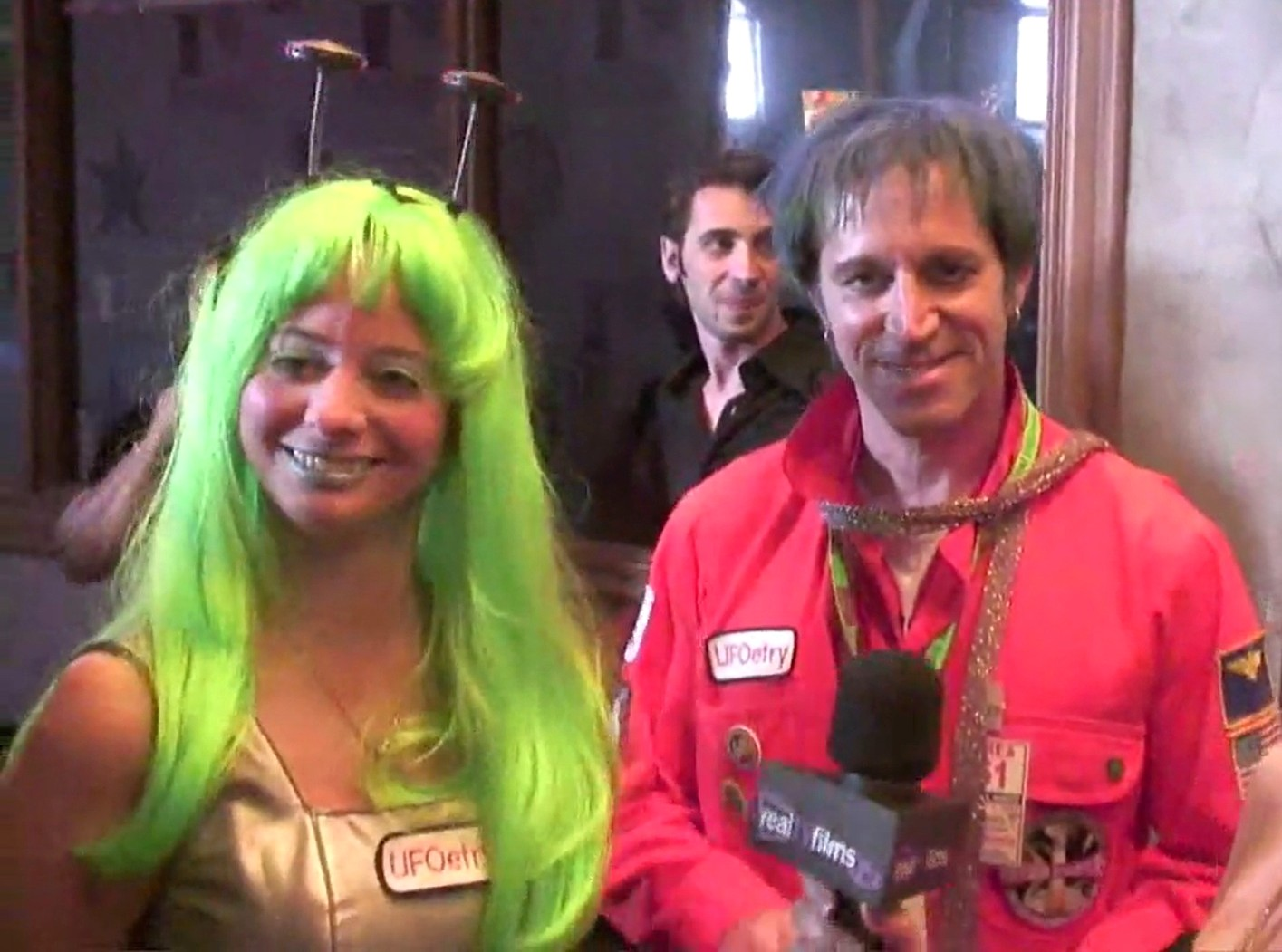
UFOetry in 2008, Joshua Poet on right

UFOetry is a band from Los Angeles, California, United States. It was formed in July 2004 by ufologist and MUFON member Joshua Poet. UFOetry performs rock operas focused on the UFO phenomena and its implications on society. Their multimedia shows combine live music and theatrical performance delivered to audiences at UFO festivals and conferences.

== Mission ==
UFOetry's stated mission is to benefit the "greater good" of the community, society and the world, by spreading the word of the UFO phenomena, across the planet, using every form of media available.

== History ==
UFOetry has been presenting its message since 2004 at UFO events in the continental United States. Some of these include: the Aztec UFO Symposium, the Retro UFO Spaceship Convention, and the Roswell UFO Festival.

UFOetry has been recognized by the Los Angeles music scene:

- Music and Poetry EP of the Year 2004
- Music Video of the Year 2005
- Best Filmed Music Award
- Concept Album of the Year…Blue Planet Tour
- Concert Performance of the Year…Roswell UFO Festival 60th Anniversary
- Stage Show of the Year...Roswell UFO Festival 61st Anniversary
- Producers Choice Award 2010

Joshua Poet has been a guest on X-Zone Radio with Rob McConnell, UFO Files with Jerry Pippin and Live From Roswell with Guy Malone, who refers to their music as "the music of ufology."

== Highlights ==
In 2006 nuclear physicist and UFOlogist, Stanton Friedman introduced UFOetry for their first performance in Aztec, New Mexico. Later that year during their performance in front of the Integratron, a sighting occurred in which six orange orbs were seen in the night sky by several observers.

In 2008 as one of the festival headliners, UFOetry gave ten performances over the three-day festival, which included a live spot on the CBS Early Edition, as well as international press in 8 countries.
