= AVP Research Foundation =

Indian research department

- Founded: 2003
- Founder: P. R. Krishna Kumar, K. G. Raveendran
- Location: Coimbatore, India
- Region served: India and overseas
- Key people: P. R. Krishna Kumar (Chairman); KG Raveendran (Vice-Chairman); Somit Kumar (Director)
- Website: www.avpresearch.org
- Formerly called: AVT Institute for Advanced Research

The AVP Research Foundation (formerly known as AVT Institute for Advanced Research) was established in 2003 as a research department under The Ayurvedic Trust and became an independent not-for-profit research institution registered under section 25 of the Companies Act, 1956 in 2012. The foundation has received awards for its clinical research on Ayurvedic medicines. It also leads initiatives on practice based evidence, and develops research- and education-oriented software for Ayurvedic fraternity and hosts a journal-indexing service in Ayurveda.

== History ==
The AVP Research Foundation (AVP RF) was established in 2003 as AVT Institute for Advanced Research (AVTAR) under The Ayurvedic Trust to administer the research initiatives of the trust and Arya Vaidya Pharmacy|The Arya Vaidya Pharmacy (Cbe) Ltd. The trust in itself had pioneered in research on arthritis right from 1980s' and later the multifaceted trust established AVTAR to concentrate on research in Ayurveda. The department in recent times became an independent institution focusing on research and education in Ayurveda. The institution is steered by a research advisory board and function under a Director & Chief Scientific Officer appointed by the Board of Directors and the Governing Council.

== Activities ==
=== Research ===
The foundation is engaged in basic and clinical research in Ayurveda, the clinical trial conducted at The Ayurvedic Trust in collaboration with UCLA Medical School on rheumatoid arthritis to see which works better for rheumatoid arthritis, Ayurveda or the Western drug methotrexate was pronounced as a blue print on how clinical research can be done in complementary and alternative medicine by Edzard Ernst. The Foundation is also engaged in research to establish evidence from on going clinical practices to substantiate the practice of Ayurveda by generating evidence on efficacy through practice-based evidence. It is also involved in basic research to elucidate the probably biochemistry behind classical Ayurvedic medicine practised in India for quite long period.

In 2020 Arya Vaidya Pharmacy has signed an MoU with Central Council for Research In Ayurveda Systems to conduct phase III Multi centric clinical trial on rheumatoid arthritis in Bengaluru and Mumbai.

In year 2017 AVP Research Foundation signed an MoU to conduct joint training programmes is USA in tie-up with South California University and in Korea through Indo-Korean collaborators.

=== Education ===
AVP Research Foundation is engaged in education by providing ancillary courses on Ayurveda for students in Ayurveda from India and abroad.

=== Informatics ===
The Foundation has an informatics department, which has developed software and programs that assist researchers and practitioners in Ayurveda to generate and document their routine clinical practice.

=== Journals ===
AVP Research Foundation manages largest number of scientific communications in Ayurveda with two research journals, Ancient Science of Life launched in 1981, which is now the largest PubMed indexed journal on Ayurveda and the first speciality research journal in Ayurveda titled ASL-Musculoskeletal Diseases published in alliance with Medknow Publications.

=== Conferences ===
AVP Research Foundation organises regular conferences, workshops and Continuing Medical Education programs in the field of Ayurveda. Insight Ayurveda is biennial conference on Ayurveda hosted by AVP Research Foundation.

=== Inter-disciplinary Research ===
Inter-disciplinary research bridging Ayurveda with modern sciences to elucidate the biochemistry behind the inherent theories in Ayurveda is also attempted at AVP Research Foundation.

=== Support for open access ===
The foundation supports open access of research and all the journals published from the institution are free and open to access online. The database developed by the foundation attempts to make the data generated out of research in Ayurveda is available to larger circle of stakeholders. The institutions also involves in pursuing more journals to come forward to be open access. The institution also have made the classical texts of Ayurveda available in digital format which is also free to access.

=== Public engagement and outreach programs ===
The foundation is engaged in public out reach programs through regular medical camps on ano-rectal diseases and eye diseases.

== Awards ==
The research in the institution was recognised with Excellence in Integrative Medicine Research Award by the European Society of Integrative Medicine in 2012.
