= Curtis Peebles =

American historian (1955–2017)

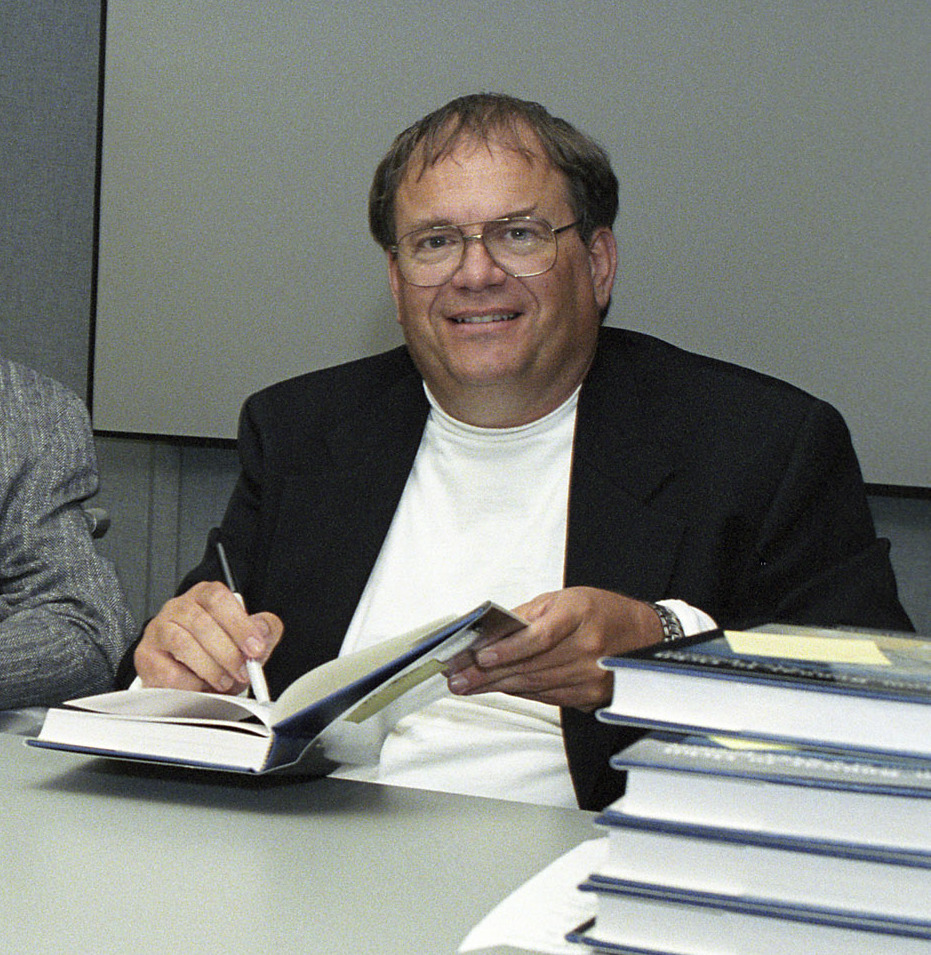
Curtis Peebles in 2004

Curtis Peebles (May 4, 1955 – June 25, 2017) was an American aerospace historian for the Smithsonian Institution, a researcher and historian for the Dryden Flight Research Center, and the author of several books dealing with aviation and aerial phenomena.

A native of San Diego, California, Peebles developed an enthusiastic interest in airplanes, rockets, and America's space program as a teenager. In 1985 he earned a Bachelor of Arts in history from California State University, Long Beach.

Peebles was probably best known as a leading skeptic of UFO sightings and incidents, and he was interviewed for several television documentaries dealing with UFOs. He appeared in the A&E Network's 1997 documentary "Where Are All the UFOs?", on the syndicated series UFO Diaries, and on the History Channel documentaries "Unsolved History: Area 51", "Roswell: The Final Declassification", and History's Mysteries. In his 1994 book Watch the Skies!, a skeptical history of the UFO phenomenon, Peebles wrote: "I am a skeptic. I believe flying saucer reports are misinterpretations of conventional objects, phenomena, and experiences. I do not believe the evidence indicates the Earth is under massive surveillance by disk-shaped alien spaceships." However, Peebles added that "these conclusions are those of the author; readers [of this book] are encouraged to make up their own minds." Choice: Current Reviews for Academic Libraries wrote in its review of Watch the Skies! that "this chronicle of the flying saucer myth is well written and provides fair balance to a very controversial topic," while Library Journal wrote that "Peebles has compiled a splendid history of this modern myth...He gives a history of practically every major UFO case since 1947, along with a discussion of the investigation and the probable correct explanation."

In addition to his UFO research, Peebles also wrote a dozen books and over 40 magazine articles dealing with a variety of aerial phenomena and aerospace history. His articles were published in such periodicals as Spaceflight and Space Education Magazine. Among his books were The Corona Project: America's First Spy Satellites, Dark Eagles: A History of Top Secret U.S. Aircraft Programs, From Runway to Orbit: Recollections of a NASA Engineer, and a series of oral histories from flight personnel at NASA's Armstrong Flight Research Center. His final book, Probing the Sky: Selected NACA Research Airplanes and Their Contributions to Flight, was published in 2014. Starting in 1977, Peebles was a freelance writer for Analytical Systems and Materials, an aeronautical engineering and research firm. He was an aerospace historian for the Smithsonian Institution in the 1990s, and from 2000 to 2013 he was a researcher and aerospace historian for the Dryden Flight Research Center (today the Armstrong Flight Research Center). He was a Fellow of the British Interplanetary Society, and a member of the Flight Test Historical Foundation.

In August 2013, Peebles was diagnosed with progressive, irreversible memory loss. He died on June 25, 2017, at the age of 62.

== Books by Peebles ==
- Watch the Skies! A Chronicle of the Flying Saucer Myth, 1994. Smithsonian Institution Press. ISBN 1-56098-343-4
- Asteroids: a History, 2001, Smithsonian Institution Press, ISBN 1-56098-982-3 (or 2000, ISBN 1-56098-389-2).
- Twilight Warriors: Covert Air Operations Against the USSR, 2005, Naval Institute Press, ISBN 1-59114-660-7
- The Moby Dick Project: Reconnaissance Balloons over Russia, 1991, Smithsonian Books, ISBN 1-56098-025-7
- Dark Eagles: A History of Top Secret U.S. Aircraft Programs, 1997. ISBN 0-89141-623-4
- Shadow Flights ISBN 0-89141-700-1
- Guardians: Strategic Reconnaissance Satellites ISBN 0-89141-284-0
- Battle for Space ISBN 0-8253-0160-2
- High Frontier: The U.S. Air Force and the Military Space Program, 1997. ISBN 0-16-048945-8
- The Corona Project: America's First Spy Satellites, Annapolis: Naval Institute Press. ISBN 1-55750-688-4.
- Flying Without Wings: NASA Lifting Bodies and the Birth of the Space Shuttle (Smithsonian History of Aviation and Spaceflight) (with Milton O. Thompson), 1999 ISBN 0-947554-78-5
