= Alien (band) =

Swedish hard rock band

- Origin: Gothenburg, Sweden
- Genres: Hard rock; AOR
- Years active: 1986–2009, 2010–present
- Labels: Virgin, Frontiers, Manora, AOR Heaven
- Members: Jim Jidhed; Tony Borg; Jimmy Wandroph; Toby Tarrach; Ken Sandin
- Past members: Mats Sandborgh; Berndt Ek; Jan Lundberg; Peter Sandberg; Bert Andersson; Imre Duan; Stefan Ridderstrale; Daniel Zangger Borch; Conny Payne; Richard Andre; Michael Wickman; Staffan Scharin; Ted Hedges
- Website: aliensweden.com

Alien is a Swedish hard rock band formed in Gothenburg in 1986 by guitarist Tony Borg and vocalist Jim Jidhed. They are best known today for their singles "Only One Woman", a cover of a Marbles song, "Tears Don't Put Out The Fire" and "Brave New Love", which was featured in the end credits of the 1988 remake of The Blob.

== History ==
=== Early success (1986–1988) ===
Borg and Jidhed's original line-up included Ken Sandin on bass guitar, Jimmy Wandroph on keyboards, and Toby Tarrach on drums. This group released the single "Only One Woman" in 1988, a cover of a song written by the Bee Gees and first recorded by The Marbles in 1968. The Alien cover reached No. 1 in Sweden and remained there for six weeks.

Later in 1988, Alien released their first, eponymous album, including "Only One Woman" as well as "Brave New Love" and "Tears Don't Put Out the Fire", which was released as a single later that year. In 1989, the band released a re-worked version of it for the US/international market, again titled Alien. This album included eight out of the twelve tracks released in the 1988 album, five of which were remixed. Two new tracks were added, "Now Love" being one and a cover of "The Air That I Breathe" the other, both sung by new vocalist Peter "Pete" Sandberg.

=== Shiftin' Gear (1988–1993) ===
In the fall of 1988, Jidhed left the band to spend more time with family and pursue a solo career and was replaced by Peter Sandberg, formerly frontman for the bands Madison and Von Rosen. In 1990, the band also made other changes, such as replacing Wandroph and Tarrach with Bert Andersson on keyboards and Imre Duan on drums. This was the line-up for the band's release of its third album, Shiftin' Gear. However, the album was not the success it was predicted to be and another major line-up change occurred. Duan was replaced on the drums by Stefan Ridderstrale, while Richard Andre took Andersson's position on the keyboards. Conny Payne, a former Madison bassist, also joined Alien in 1993. Peter Sandberg, the band's lead singer, eventually left and started a solo career. Alien enlisted Daniel Zangger Borch to take his position.

=== Band stability (1993–2005) ===
Alien returned to the studios to record their fourth album, again titled Alien. Ridderstrale, although performing on tour, did not participate in the recording sessions and Michael Wilkman stood in as drummer. Production was weak and the band lost much of its following. This can also be attributed to the numerous band member changes between 1990 and 1993.

Ridderstrale officially left the band in 1995 and Staffan Scharrin became the drummer, thus completing the band's present lineup. This new formation released the band's fifth album, Crash in 1995. This album featured heavier metal songs than previously recorded by Alien.

Since then, Alien released three more albums, Best and Rare (1997, compilation), Live in Stockholm 1990 (2001) and Dark Eyes (2005). Dark Eyes was the first album to feature all new recordings and marked the return of Jim Jidhed to the band now composed of him, Mats Sandborgh on keyboards, Berndt Ek on bass, Jan Lundberg on drums alongside Borg.

=== Reunion (2010–) ===
Alien has finally reunited with the complete and original lineup. They toured in 2010 for the first time since 1989 at Monsters of Rock in Eskilstuna, Sweden, and released their first new single in October 2010 – Ready to Fly. The band released their long-awaited new studio album Eternity on 25 April 2014 through the German-based label AOR HEaven. The band will tour again on 16 August 2014 in Falun, Sweden and again on 25 October at the HEAT festival in Ludwigsburg, Germany.

=== New Alien (2020–present) ===
Alien has now only 3 original band members and released 'Into the future' in 2020 with a new sound, with harder metal.
In 2025 they released another album, featuring a cover resembling the first album. The sound is back to 80s AOR.

== Band members ==
=== Current ===
- Jim Jidhed – lead vocals (1987–88, 2005, 2010–present)
- Tony Borg – guitars (1986–1995, 2005, 2010–present)
- Toby Tarrach – drums (1986–1990, 2010–present)

=== Former ===
- Jimmy Wandroph – keyboards (1986–1990, 2019)
- Ken Sandin – bass (1986–1990, 2019)
- Hans Gislasson – lead vocals (1986–87)
- Peter "Pete" Sandberg – lead vocals (1989–1993)
- Bert Andersson – keyboards (1990–93)
- Imre Duan – drums (1990–93)
- Stefan Ridderstrale – drums (1993–95)
- Daniel Zangger Borch – lead vocals (1993–2005)
- Conny Payne – bass (1993–2005)
- Richard Andre – keyboards (1993–2005)
- Michael Wickman – drums (1993–95)
- Staffan Scharin – drums (1995–2005)
- Mats Sandborgh – keyboards (2005–09)
- Berndt Ek – bass (2005–09)
- Jan Lundberg – drums (2005–09)

== Discography ==
=== Studio albums ===
- Alien (1988)
- Shiftin' Gear (1990)
- Alien III (1993)
- Crash (1995)
- Dark Eyes (2005)
- Eternity (2014)
- Into the Future (2020)
- When Yesterday Comes Around (2025)

=== Remix albums ===
- Alien II (1989) (US edition)

=== Live albums ===
- Live in Stockholm 1990 (2001)

=== Compilation albums ===
- Best & Rare (1997)

=== Singles ===
- "I'll Survive" (1987)
- "Headstrong" (1987)
- "Tears Don't Put Out the Fire" (1988)
- "Go Easy" (1988)
- "Only One Woman" (1988)
- "The Air That I Breathe" (1989)
- "Easy Livin'" (1989)
- "Angel Eyes" (1990)
- "Turn on the Radio" (1990)
- "Take Me to Heaven" (1993)
- "Number One" (1993)
- "Vit Jul" (1993)
- "Ready to Fly" (2010)
- "Imagine" (2018)
- "Night of Fire" (2020)
- "What Are We Fighting For" (2020)
