= Alien (Alien album) =

Studio album by Alien
- Released: 1988
- Label: Virgin

Alien chronology
Alien (1988)	Shiftin' Gear (1990)

Singles from Alien
- 1. "Only One Woman" Released: 1988; 2. "Tears Don't Put Out the Fire" Released: 1988; 3. "Go Easy" Released: 1988

Alien is the debut album by Swedish rock band Alien. It was released in 1988 by Virgin Records. The album peaked at #2 in Sweden.

They reached number one in Sweden with their cover of the Marbles' 'Only One Woman'.

== Track listing ==
No.	Title	Writer(s)	Length
1.	"Brave New Love"	Gary Cambra, Pamela Barlow, Janet Minto	3:56
2.	"Tears Don't Put Out the Fire"	Minto, Barlow	4:10
3.	"Go Easy"	Brad Bailey, Patrick Regan, Minto, Barlow	3:42
4.	"I've Been Waiting"	Minto, Barlow	5:05
5.	"Jaime Remember"	Jim Jidhed, Jimmy Janson, Mats Sandin, Tony Borg, Toby Tarrach, Minto, Barlow	4:42
6.	"Feel My Love"	Minto, Jidhed, Jimmy Wandroph, Max Stone, Barlow, Tarrach, Borg, Ulf Erik Sandin	3:42
7.	"Only One Woman"	Barry Gibb, Maurice Gibb, Robin Gibb	4:11
8.	"Wings of Fire"	Bailey, Minto, Barlow, Regan	3:24
9.	"Dying by the Golden Rule"	Minto, Barlow	3:54
10.	"Touch My Fire"	Minto, Barlow	4:04
11.	"Dreamer"	Minto, Sandin, Jidhed, Janson	4:40
12.	"Mirror"	Minto, Jidhed, Janson, Sandin	4:27

== Personnel ==
Alien

- Jim Jidhed – lead and backing vocals
- Tony Borg – guitars
- Jimmy Wandroph – keyboards
- Ken Sandin – bass
- Toby Tarrach – drums

Additional personnel

- Pam Barlow – backing vocals
- Janet Minto – backing vocals
- Lorraine Frisaura – backing vocals

== Charts ==
Chart (1988)	Peak position
Swedish Albums (Sverigetopplistan)	2
