= Simply Red discography =

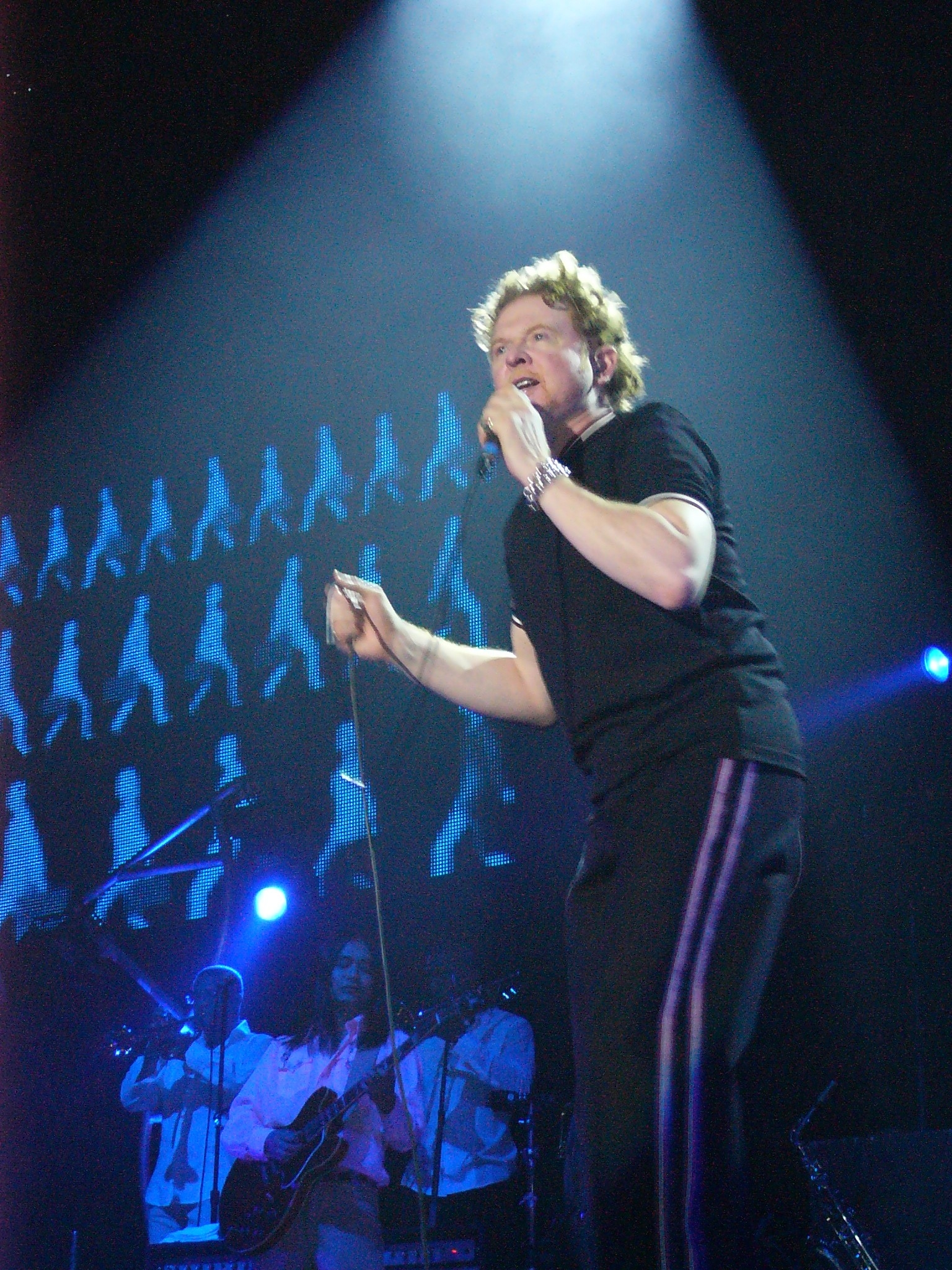
- The band performing in Bremen, 2003
- Studio albums: 13
- Extended plays: 2
- Live albums: 6
- Compilation albums: 8
- Singles: 56
- Video albums: 14
- Music videos: 49

The discography of Simply Red, a British soul band, consists of thirteen studio albums, five live albums, eight compilation albums, two extended plays, fifty-six singles, fourteen video albums, forty-nine music videos and a number of other appearances.

The band's first single "Money's Too Tight (To Mention)", was released in 1985 and reached the United Kingdom Top 20. Their debut album, Picture Book, was also released in 1985. The following year the band released "Holding Back the Years", which reached number one in Ireland and the US and number two in the UK. Their second album, Men and Women was released in 1987. Third album A New Flame was released in 1989, containing "If You Don't Know Me by Now", which became their second US number one hit. Their fourth album Stars became the best-selling album for two years running in Europe after its release in 1991 and was certified 12× Platinum in the UK.

Simply Red released "Fairground" in 1995, which became the band's first UK number one single. Its parent album was Life. The band followed this up with cover heavy Blue in 1998 and Love and the Russian Winter in 1999. Subsequent releases included Home in 2003, a mixture of original songs and covers; Simplified in 2005, mainly an album of stripped-down versions of their hit songs; and Stay, which was the band's tenth studio album released in 2007.

Mick Hucknall announced his intention to split the band in 2010; following which the band embarked on a farewell tour which commenced during 2009 and 2010. The band re-formed in 2015.

== Albums ==
=== Studio albums ===
Title	Album details	Peak chart positions										Sales	Certifications (sales thresholds)
Title	Album details	UK	AUS	AUT	FRA	GER	NL	NZ	SWE	SWI	US	Sales	Certifications (sales thresholds)
Picture Book	Released: 11 October 1985; Label: WEA; Formats: CD, cassette, LP	2	6	10	—	8	1	9	26	12	16		BPI: 5× Platinum; ARIA: 2× Platinum; BVMI: 3× Gold; IFPI AUT: Gold; IFPI SWI: Platinum; NVPI: Platinum; RIAA: Platinum; SNEP: Gold
Men and Women	Released: 9 March 1987; Label: WEA; Formats: CD, cassette, LP	2	5	3	—	3	2	4	4	1	31		BPI: 3× Platinum; IFPI AUT: Gold; SNEP: Gold; NVPI: Gold; BVMI: Platinum
A New Flame	Released: 13 February 1989; Label: WEA; Formats: CD, cassette, LP	1	2	2	—	2	4	1	4	1	22		BPI: 7× Platinum; ARIA: 3× Platinum; BVMI: Platinum; GLF: Gold; IFPI AUT: Platinum; IFPI SWI: Platinum; MC: Platinum; NVPI: Platinum; RIAA: Gold; SNEP: Platinum
Stars	Released: 30 September 1991; Label: EastWest; Formats: CD, cassette, LP	1	7	1	—	4	3	2	7	2	76	UK: 3,410,000	BPI: 12× Platinum; ARIA: 2× Platinum; BVMI: 5× Gold; IFPI AUT: 2× Platinum; IFPI SWI: 2× Platinum; MC: Gold; NVPI: Platinum; RIAA: Gold; SNEP: Platinum
Life	Released: 9 October 1995; Label: EastWest; Formats: CD, cassette, LP	1	7	1	—	1	3	3	2	1	75		BPI: 5× Platinum; ARIA: Platinum; BVMI: Platinum; IFPI: 3× Platinum; IFPI AUT: Platinum; IFPI SWI: Gold; NVPI: Platinum; SNEP: Gold
Blue	Released: 19 May 1998; Label: EastWest; Formats: CD, cassette, LP	1	38	1	21	1	25	13	5	3	145		BPI: 2× Platinum; BVMI: Gold; IFPI: Platinum; IFPI AUT: Platinum; IFPI SWI: Gold
Love and the Russian Winter	Released: 1 November 1999; Label: EastWest; Formats: CD, cassette, LP	6	—	3	57	2	41	—	31	8	—		BPI: Platinum; BVMI: Platinum; IFPI: Platinum; IFPI AUT: Gold
Home	Released: 24 March 2003; Label: simplyred.com; Formats: CD	2	15	8	8	5	2	19	40	6	187		BPI: 2× Platinum; BVMI: Platinum; IFPI: Platinum; IFPI AUT: Gold; IFPI SWI: Gold; MC: Gold; NVPI: Platinum; SNEP: Gold
Simplified	Released: 17 October 2005; Label: simplyred.com; Formats: CD	3	—	2	64	4	10	—	47	3	—		BPI: Gold
Stay	Released: 12 March 2007; Label: simplyred.com; Formats: CD	4	—	6	58	4	3	—	—	6	156		BPI: Gold
Big Love	Released: 29 May 2015; Label: EastWest; Formats: CD, digital download	4	22	11	122	6	—	13	—	10	—		BPI: Gold
Blue Eyed Soul	Released: 8 November 2019; Label: BMG; Formats: Vinyl, CD, digital download	6	— (Note: Blue Eyed Soul did not enter the ARIA Albums Chart, but peaked at number 39 on the ARIA Digital Album Chart.)	5	57	11	27	—	—	17	—		
Time	Released: 26 May 2023; Label: Warner Music; Formats: Vinyl, CD, digital download	8	—	7	83	9	26	—	—	11	—		

=== Compilation albums ===
Title	Album details	Peak chart positions								Certifications
Title	Album details	UK	AUS	AUT	GER	IRE	NL	SWE	US	Certifications
Greatest Hits	Released: 7 October 1996; Label: EastWest; Formats: CD, cassette	1	4	1	2	28	3	3	116	BPI: 6× Platinum; ARIA: 4× Platinum; BVMI: Platinum; GLF: Gold; IFPI: 3× Platinum; IFPI AUT: Platinum; IFPI SWI: Gold; NVPI: Platinum; SNEP: 2× Gold
It's Only Love	Released: 13 November 2000; Label: EastWest; Formats: CD, cassette	27	99	5	35	25	40	19	—	BPI: Gold; BVMI: Gold
The Very Best of Simply Red	Released: 28 April 2003; Label: Warner; Formats: CD	NR	—	30	36	36	21	—	—	
Simply Red 25: The Greatest Hits	Released: 17 November 2008; Label: Razor & Tie; Formats: CD	9	64	25	17	26	3	—	—	BPI: 3× Platinum; ARIA: Gold; BVMI: Platinum; IFPI SWI: Gold
Songs of Love	Released: February 2010; Label: simplyred.com; Formats: CD	12	—	—	86	—	—	—	—	BPI: Silver
Song Book 1985–2010	Released: 2 December 2013; Label: Rhino/simplyred.com; Formats: 4-CD box set	41	16	—	—	—	—	—	—	BPI: Gold
Remixed Vol. 1 (1985–2000)	Released: 22 October 2021; Label: EastWest, simplyred.com; Formats: CD, digital download	—	—	—	—	—	—	—	—	
Recollections	Released: 21 November 2025; Label: simplyred.com; Formats: CD, Vinyl, digital download	45	—	15	14	—	19	—	—	

=== Live albums ===
- Cuba! (2006)
- Stay: Live at the Royal Albert Hall (2007)
- Simply Red Farewell – Live in Concert at Sydney Opera House (2011)
- Home (Live in Sicily) (2014)
- Symphonica in Rosso – Live at Ziggo Dome, Amsterdam (2018)
- Holding Back the Years: 40 Years of Simply Red – Live in Santiago (2026)

== Extended plays ==
Title	Details	Peak chart positions	
Title	Details	UK	AUS
The Montreux EP	Released: 9 November 1992; Label: EastWest; Formats: CD, Cassette, LP	11	130
Picture Book B-Sides & Rarities	Released: 13 November 2020; Label: Warner Music; Formats: digital download	—	—

== Singles ==
=== 1980s ===
Title	Year	Peak chart positions										Certifications	Album
Title	Year	UK	AUS	BEL	CAN	GER	IRE	NLD	NZ	SWI	US	Certifications	Album
"Money's Too Tight (To Mention)"	1985	13	21	17	51	—	9	24	8	—	28		Picture Book
"Come to My Aid"	1985	66	—	—	—	—	—	—	24	—	—		Picture Book
"Holding Back the Years"	1985	51	—	8	—	—	—	3	—	—	—		Picture Book
"Jericho"	1986	53	—	20	—	57	—	17	—	—	—		Picture Book
"Holding Back the Years" (re-issue)	1986	2	16	—	6	—	1	—	40	—	1	BPI: Gold	Picture Book
"Open Up the Red Box"	1986	61	70	24	—	—	28	—	38	—	—		Picture Book
"The Right Thing"	1987	11	17	4	21	27	12	4	9	10	27		Men and Women
"Infidelity"	1987	31	54	34	—	—	13	57	26	—	—		Men and Women
"Maybe Someday..."	1987	88	—	—	—	—	—	—	—	—	—		Men and Women
"Ev'ry Time We Say Goodbye"	1987	11	—	30	—	—	14	27	—	—	—		Men and Women
"I Won't Feel Bad"	1988	68	—	—	—	—	—	—	—	—	—		Men and Women
"It's Only Love"	1989	13	31	11	30	21	7	9	31	12	57		A New Flame
"If You Don't Know Me by Now"	1989	2	1	5	3	19	4	3	1	12	1	BPI: Gold; ARIA: Gold; RIAA: Gold	A New Flame
"A New Flame"	1989	17	48	33	—	55	28	27	22	—	—		A New Flame
"You've Got It"	1989	46	127	—	48	—	14	—	—	—	—		A New Flame
"—" denotes singles that were released but did not chart, or singles not released in a particular territory.

=== 1990s ===
Title	Year	Peak chart positions										Certifications	Album
Title	Year	UK	AUS	AUT	BEL	CAN	GER	IRE	NLD	NZ	US	Certifications	Album
"Something Got Me Started"	1991	11	29	5	15	11	11	8	5	10	23		Stars
"Stars"	1991	8	29	18	16	17	19	13	15	32	44	BPI: Platinum	Stars
"For Your Babies"	1992	9	55	23	30	39	43	11	40	47	—	BPI: Silver	Stars
"Thrill Me"	1992	33	109	—	—	—	—	30	58	—	—		Stars
"Your Mirror"	1992	17	120	—	—	—	59	28	—	—	—		Stars
"Fairground"	1995	1	7	5	2	—	5	1	6	6	— (Note: "Fairground" did not enter the Billboard Hot 100, but peaked at number 14 on the Bubbling Under Hot 100 chart.)	BPI: Platinum; ARIA: Gold; BVMI: Gold	Life
"Remembering the First Time"	1995	22	—	—	—	—	55	—	23	30	—		Life
"Never Never Love"	1996	18	42	—	—	—	—	—	—	—	—		Life
"We're in This Together"	1996	11	—	23	—	—	32	—	28	—	—		Life
"Angel"	1996	4	—	—	—	—	71	23	—	11	—	BPI: Silver	Greatest Hits
"Night Nurse" (featuring Sly & Robbie)	1997	13	—	—	—	—	84	—	—	44	—		Blue
"Say You Love Me"	1998	7	—	18	—	—	49	15	71	—	—		Blue
"The Air That I Breathe"	1998	6	—	17	—	—	66	—	82	—	—	BPI: Silver	Blue
"Ghetto Girl"	1998	34	—	—	—	—	—	—	—	—	—		Blue
"To Be Free"	1998	—	—	—	—	—	88	—	—	—	—		Blue
"Ain't That a Lot of Love"	1999	14	—	29	48	—	55	—	36	41	—		Love and the Russian Winter
"—" denotes singles that were released but did not chart, or singles not released in a particular territory.

=== 2000s–present ===
Title	Year	Peak chart positions										Certifications	Album
Title	Year	UK	AUS	AUT	BEL	CAN	GER	IRE	NLD	SWI	US Adult	Certifications	Album
"Your Eyes"	2000	26	—	—	—	—	95	—	—	—	—		Love and the Russian Winter
"Sunrise"	2003	7	35	25	35	3	14	14	4	22	5	BPI: Gold; MC: Gold	Home
"Fake"	2003	21	97	—	54	—	43	49	12	41	—		Home
"You Make Me Feel Brand New"	2003	7	100	47	—	—	43	—	43	76	10		Home
"Home"	2004	40	—	—	—	—	—	—	74	—	24		Home
"Perfect Love"	2005	30	—	23	59	—	45	—	69	34	16		Simplified
"A Song for You" / "Something Got Me Started"	2006	—	—	—	—	—	—	—	—	—	—		Simplified
"Oh! What a Girl!"	2006	57	—	43	—	—	68	—	—	23	—		Stay
"So Not Over You"	2007	34	—	36	70	—	65	—	31	—	22		Stay
"Stay"	2007	36	—	—	—	—	—	—	—	—	—		Stay
"The World and You Tonight"	2007	—	—	—	—	—	—	—	—	—	—		Stay
"Go Now"	2008	—	—	—	—	—	—	—	—	—	21		Simply Red 25: The Greatest Hits
"Money's Too Tight" (2009 version)	2009	—	—	—	—	—	—	—	—	—	—		Simply Red 25: The Greatest Hits
"Shine On"	2015	—	—	—	71	—	—	—	—	—	—		Big Love
"The Ghost of Love"	2015	—	—	—	75	—	—	—	—	—	—		Big Love
"Love Gave Me More"	2015	—	—	—	—	—	—	—	—	—	—		Big Love
"Thinking of You"	2019	—	—	—	74	—	—	—	—	—	—		Blue Eyed Soul
"BadBootz"	2019	—	—	—	—	—	—	—	—	—	—		Blue Eyed Soul
"Sweet Child"	2019	—	—	—	Tip	—	—	—	—	—	—		Blue Eyed Soul
"Complete Love"	2019	—	—	—	—	—	—	—	—	—	—		Blue Eyed Soul
"Tonight"	2019	—	—	—	—	—	—	—	—	—	—		Blue Eyed Soul
"Earth in a Lonely Space"	2021	—	—	—	—	—	—	—	—	—	—		Time
"Better with You"	2023	—	—	—	—	—	—	—	—	—	—		Time
"Shades 22"	2023	—	—	—	—	—	—	—	—	—	—		Time
"Just Like You"	2023	—	—	—	—	—	—	—	—	—	—		Time
"—" denotes singles that were released but did not chart, or singles not released in a particular territory.

== Other charted songs ==
List of charting album deep cuts
Title	Year	Peak	Album
Title	Year	SPA Air.	Album
"Thank You"	1999	4	Love and the Russian Winter

== Videography ==
=== Video albums ===
- Simply Red (1988)
- Let Me Take You Home (1990)
- Moving Picture Book (1991)
- A Starry Night with Simply Red (1992)
- Greatest Video Hits (1996)
- Live in London (1998)
- Home Live in Sicily (2003)
- Classic Albums: Stars (2005)
- Cuba (2006)
- Stay – Live at the Royal Albert Hall (2007)
- Simply Red 25: The Greatest Hits (2008)
- Simply Red Farewell – Live in Concert at Sydney Opera House (2011)
- Simply Red: Live at Montreux (2012)
- Symphonica in Rosso (2018)

=== Music videos ===
Title	Year	Director
"Money's Too Tight (To Mention)"	1985	
"Come to My Aid" (2 versions)	1985	
"Holding Back the Years"	1985	Tony van den Ende
"Jericho"	1986	
"Open Up the Red Box"	1986	
"The Right Thing"	1987	
"Infidelity"	1987	
"Maybe Someday..."	1987	
"Ev'ry Time We Say Goodbye"	1987	
"I Won't Feel Bad"	1988	
"It's Only Love"	1989	Andy Morahan
"If You Don't Know Me by Now"	1989	
"A New Flame"	1989	
"You've Got It"	1989	
"Something Got Me Started"	1991	Andy Morahan
"Stars"	1991	
"For Your Babies"	1992	
"Thrill Me"	1992	
"Your Mirror"	1992	
"Lady Godiva's Room"	1992	
"Fairground"	1995	
"Remembering the First Time"	1995	
"Never Never Love"	1996	Zanna
"We're in This Together"	1996	Zanna
"So Beautiful"	1996	
"Angel"	1996	
"Night Nurse"	1997	
"Say You Love Me"	1998	
"The Air That I Breathe"	1998	
"Ghetto Girl"	1998	
"Ain't That a Lot of Love"	1999	Mike Lipscombe
"Your Eyes"	2000	
"Sunrise"	2003	
"Fake" (single version)	2003	Andy Morahan
"You Make Me Feel Brand New"	2003	
"Home"	2004	
"Perfect Love"	2005	
"Something Got Me Started" (re-recorded)	2006	
"A Song for You"	2006	
"Oh! What a Girl!"	2006	
"So Not Over You"	2007	
"Go Now"	2008	
"Shine On"	2015	
"Dad"	2015	
"Better with You"	2023	
"Shades 22"	2023	
"Just Like You"	2023	
"It Wouldn't Be Me"	2023	
