= Symphonica in Rosso – Live at Ziggo Dome, Amsterdam =

Live album by Simply Red
- Released: 23 November 2018
- Recorded: October 2017
- Venue: Ziggo Dome, Amsterdam, Netherlands
- Label: BMG Rights Management
- Producer: Andy Wright

Simply Red chronology
Big Love (2015)	Symphonica in Rosso – Live at Ziggo Dome, Amsterdam (2018)	Blue Eyed Soul (2019)

Symphonica in Rosso – Live at Ziggo Dome, Amsterdam is a live album by British soul-pop group Simply Red. The album was released on 23 November 2018.

== Track listing ==
CD / digital download version
No.	Title	Length
1.	"All or Nothing at All"	4:24
2.	"Your Mirror"	4:43
3.	"For Your Babies"	5:01
4.	"Someday in My Life"	4:17
5.	"So Beautiful"	5:02
6.	"Say You Love Me"	4:12
7.	"Big Love"	4:24
8.	"Home"	3:47
9.	"Smile"	3:22
10.	"It Was a Very Good Year"	4:28
11.	"Picture Book"	6:10
12.	"Holding Back the Years"	4:48
13.	"Stars"	4:11
14.	"A New Flame"	3:55
15.	"It's Only Love"	4:34
16.	"Sunrise"	3:37
17.	"Something Got Me Started"	4:06
18.	"Fairground"	6:17
19.	"My Way"	4:53
20.	"If You Don't Know Me by Now"	6:04

DVD version
No.	Title	Length
1.	"All or Nothing at All"	4:24
2.	"Your Mirror"	5:09
3.	"For Your Babies"	5:01
4.	"Someday in My Life"	5:04
5.	"So Beautiful"	5:17
6.	"Say You Love Me"	4:07
7.	"Home"	3:49
8.	"Smile"	3:37
9.	"It Was a Very Good Year"	4:51
10.	"Picture Book"	5:56
11.	"Holding Back the Years"	4:43
12.	"Stars"	4:10
13.	"A New Flame"	3:54
14.	"It's Only Love"	4:34
15.	"Sunrise"	3:37
16.	"Something Got Me Started"	4:11
17.	"Fairground"	8:00
18.	"My Way"	4:53
19.	"If You Don't Know Me by Now"	7:31

== Charts ==
Chart (2018)	Peak position
Austrian Albums (Ö3 Austria)	52
Belgian Albums (Ultratop Flanders)	98
Dutch Albums (Album Top 100)	41
UK Albums (OCC)	58
