= Ain't That a Lot of Love =

1999 song performed by Simply Red

"(Ain't That) a Lot of Love" is a 1966 song written by Homer Banks and Willia Dean Parker, and first released by Banks on Minit Records, titled "A Lot of Love".

== Simply Red version ==
"Ain't That a Lot of Love"

Single by Simply Red

from the album Love and the Russian Winter
- B-side: "Come On in My Kitchen"
- Released: 18 October 1999
- Genre: House
- Length: 3:56 (album version); 3:17 (single version)
- Label: East West
- Songwriters: Willia Dean Parker, Homer Banks
- Producers: Andy Wright, Gota Yashiki & Mick Hucknall

Simply Red singles chronology
"To Be Free" (1998)	"Ain't That a Lot of Love" (1999)	"Your Eyes" (2000)

Music video
- "Ain't That a Lot of Love" on YouTube

In 1999, British soul and pop band Simply Red made a cover of the song as "Ain't That a Lot of Love". It was released as the first single from their seventh studio album, Love and the Russian Winter (1999), and was a top 20 hit in Iceland, Scotland and the UK. On the Eurochart Hot 100, it peaked at number 28. Remixes by Club 69 and Phats & Small were released as bonus tracks on a 2008 Special Edition of the album. A black-and-white music video was filmed for the song, directed by Mike Lipscombe. The same year, Welsh singer Tom Jones covered the song with Simply Red on his 1999 duet album Reload.

=== Critical reception ===
James Poletti from Dotmusic viewed the song as "a similarly house-influenced production", like "Fairground". He added that it "is indebted to the popular late 90s prototype laid down by Stardust's 'Music Sounds Better with You'. The connection isn't as directly obvious this time but the song is built around that kind of groove." A reviewer from Florida Today said it "conjures up a flash of magic". John Terlesky from The Morning Call stated that "its rhythmic hooks and catchy chorus, tarted up with techno trappings, stand out" of the other songs of the album.

=== Track listing ===
CD single, UK (1999)
No.	Title	Length
1.	"Ain't That a Lot of Love" (Edit)	3:17
2.	"Ain't That a Lot of Love" (Phats & Small Mutant Disco Vocal Mix)	6:10

CD single, Europe (1999)
No.	Title	Length
1.	"Ain't That a Lot of Love" (Edit)	3:17
2.	"Ain't That a Lot of Love" (Phats & Small Mutant Disco Vocal Mix)	6:10
3.	"Ain't That a Lot of Love" (Club 69 Underground Dub Mix)	6:36
4.	"Ain't That a Lot of Love" (Johnny Vicious Filter Factory Dub Mix)	8:56

=== Charts ===
Chart (1999)	Peak position
Austria (Ö3 Austria Top 40)	29
Belgium (Ultratop Flanders)	48
Europe (Eurochart Hot 100)	28
Germany (GfK Entertainment)	55
Iceland (Íslenski Listinn Topp 40)	20
Italy (Musica e dischi)	29
Italy Airplay (Music & Media)	4
Netherlands (Dutch Top 40)	36
Netherlands (Single Top 100)	68
New Zealand (RIANZ)	41
Scotland (OCC)	16
Switzerland (Swiss Hitparade)	45
UK Singles (OCC)	14

== Other cover versions ==
- The Spencer Davis Group utilized the basic riff for their 1966 song "Gimme Some Lovin'"
- Sam & Dave recorded the song for their 1968 Stax Records/Atlantic Records LP, I Thank You.
- Taj Mahal covered the song on his 1968 album The Natch'l Blues. He performed the song on the Rolling Stones' TV show Rock 'n Roll Circus in 1968 with Jesse Ed Davis on guitar.
- Three Dog Night covered the song on their 1969 album Suitable for Framing.
- The Flying Burrito Brothers covered it on their 1972 album Last of the Red Hot Burritos.
- The Band covered it on their 1977 album Islands.
- Webb Wilder covered it on his 1989 album Hybrid Vigor.
- The Fabulous Thunderbirds covered it on their 1991 album Walk That Walk, Talk That Talk.
- Tom Jones covered it with Simply Red on his 1999 duet album Reload.
- Beverley Knight covered it on her 2007 album Music City Soul.
- Jet covered the song on the 2020 re-release of their 2003 album Get Born.
