= Recollection (disambiguation) =

Recollection is the retrieval of memory, the act of remembering.

Recollections is a 1969 compilation album by American singer Judy Collins.

Recollection(s) may also refer to:

== Philosophy ==
- Plato's doctrine of recollection: see Anamnesis (philosophy)
- Recollection (Buddhism), or Anussati

== Music ==
=== Songs ===
- "Recollection" (Hob. XXVIa:26), English song by Franz Joseph Haydn

=== Albums ===
- Recollection (Superchick album)
- Recollection (k.d. Lang album)
- Recollection (Leslie Phillips album)
- Recollection (Strawbs album)
- Recollection, album by Laurent Voulzy 2008, #2 in France
- Recollection, an album by Creedence Clearwater Revisited
- Recollection: The Best of Concrete Blonde
- Recollection: The Best of Nichole Nordeman
- Recollections, a number of albums by English comedian and singer Neil Innes
- Recollections, a compilation album by Simply Red 2025

== Other uses ==
- The Recollection, a 2011 science fiction novel by Gareth L. Powell
- ReCollections, a brand by American retail chain Michaels
- a congregation of Recollects, a type of reformation within a religious (notably Catholic) order
