= Big Love (Simply Red album) =

Studio album by Simply Red
- Released: 29 May 2015
- Recorded: 2014–2015
- Genre: Soul, pop
- Length: 43:15
- Label: East West
- Producer: Andy Wright, Mick Hucknall

Simply Red chronology
Song Book 1985-2010 (2013)	Big Love (2015)	Symphonica in Rosso – Live at Ziggo Dome, Amsterdam (2018)

Singles from Big Love
- 1. "Shine On" Released: 21 April 2015; 2. "The Ghost of Love" Released: 10 July 2015; 3. "Love Gave Me More" Released: 26 October 2015

Big Love is the eleventh studio album by British pop group Simply Red. The album was released on 29 May 2015 by East West Records. It is their first studio album since Stay (2007), and the first album to only feature original material since Life (1995). Big Love is also the first album to be released under a new recording contract with East West Records, a label Simply Red previously were signed to until April 2000.

== Background ==
On 3 November 2014, Simply Red announced they would be reforming in Autumn 2015 for the Big Love Tour, a 30th anniversary European tour

On 19 April 2015, on their official Facebook page, the band announced that they would be releasing a new studio album containing 12 new tracks.

Lead singer Mick Hucknall said of the album: "Once I began wondering how Simply Red were going to sound, I started writing songs. With Stay I was running away from Simply Red. But now I'm comfortable with the notion of us as a blue-eyed soul group. I had to stop myself fighting that idea. Our sound is original too. I honestly don't know of another band that has pulled so many musical strands together". Hucknall has said he wanted to make an album like Stars with a consistent theme: "And the theme here is life from a family viewpoint. It’s an album that deals with birth, love, death, and all the stuff in between".

== Chart performance ==
The album debuted at number four on the UK Albums Chart, with first-week sales of 18,292 copies, becoming Simply Red's 13th top 10 album. In December 2015, the album was certified silver by the British Phonographic Industry (BPI) for shipments of 60,000 copies in the UK.

== Critical reception ==
Professional ratings
Aggregate scores
Source	Rating
Metacritic	56/100
Review scores
Source	Rating

At Metacritic, which assigns a "weighted average" rating out of 100 from selected independent ratings and reviews from mainstream critics, the album received a Metascore of 58, based on 7 reviews, indicating "mixed or average reviews". Harriet Gibsone of The Guardian gave Big Love three out of five stars and wrote that, "a wizened nostalgia hangs above this blue-eyed soul – the songs are smooth and sentimental, like easy-listening epitaphs. Wistful laments are nothing new for the group, and their unbridled sincerity remains consistent." The Telegraph's Helen Brown also gave the album three out of five stars, and commented that "Hucknall appears to have got some of his mojo back, with added sincerity."

== Track listing ==
All tracks are written by Mick Hucknall.

Big Love – Standard version
No.	Title	Length
1.	"Shine On"	3:12
2.	"Daydreaming"	3:38
3.	"Big Love"	4:09
4.	"The Ghost of Love"	3:16
5.	"Dad"	3:54
6.	"Love Wonders"	3:56
7.	"Love Gave Me More"	3:17
8.	"Tight Tones"	3:35
9.	"WORU"	4:13
10.	"Coming Home"	2:53
11.	"The Old Man and the Beer"	2:54
12.	"Each Day"	4:19

Big Love – Japanese version (bonus track)
No.	Title	Length
13.	"Heart of Gold"	2:57

Big Love – iTunes version (bonus track)
No.	Title	Length
13.	"Shine On" (Max Bidda radio mix)	3:03

- The album was re-released on 27 November 2015 in a two-disc version entitled Big Love – Greatest Hits Edition (30th Anniversary), featuring a second CD with 18 previously released tracks.

== Personnel ==
=== Musicians ===
- Mick Hucknall – vocals, guitars, all backing vocals (2–7, 10, 11, 12)
- Dave Clayton – keyboards
- Kenji Suzuki – guitars
- Jack Stevens – bass (3, 4, 6, 7, 9, 10, 11)
- Roman Roth – drums (1–4, 6–11)
- Ian Kirkham – saxophone (1, 2, 10, 11)
- Kevin Robinson – flugelhorn (3, 6), trumpet (10, 11)

with:

- Danny Saxon – additional keyboards (1, 2)
- Juan Ayala Valdez – additional keyboards (7), additional guitars (7)
- Gavin Goldberg – programming
- Andy Wright – programming, backing vocals (1), bass (8)
- Mark Jaimes – additional guitars (1, 2), bass (1, 2)
- Steve Lewinson – bass (5, 12)
- Pete Lewinson – drums (5, 12)
- Peter-John Vettese – string arrangements (2, 3, 4, 6, 7, 9), backing vocals (9)
- Jim McWilliam – orchestrations and conducting (3, 4, 6, 7, 9)
- Isobel Griffiths – orchestra fixing (3, 4, 6, 7, 9)
- Everton Nelson – orchestra leader (3, 4, 6, 7, 9)
- David Whitaker – string arrangements (12)
- Sam Swallow – backing vocals (1)
- Purdy – vocal feature (7)
- Lauren Flynn – backing vocals (8)

=== Production ===
- Andy Wright – producer
- Mick Hucknall – producer, mixing
- Lewis Chapman – recording
- Gavin Goldberg – recording
- Adrian Hall – recording, mix engineer
- Lorenzo Agius – photography
- Dean Chalkey – band photography

== Charts ==
=== Weekly charts ===
Weekly chart performance for Big Love
Chart (2015)	Peak position
Australian Albums (ARIA)	22
Austrian Albums (Ö3 Austria)	11
Belgian Albums (Ultratop Flanders)	36
Belgian Albums (Ultratop Wallonia)	31
Dutch Albums (Album Top 100)	2
French Albums (SNEP)	122
German Albums (Offizielle Top 100)	6
Hungarian Albums (MAHASZ)	9
Irish Albums (IRMA)	34
Italian Albums (FIMI)	21
New Zealand Albums (RMNZ)	13
Spanish Albums (PROMUSICAE)	29
Swiss Albums (Schweizer Hitparade)	10
UK Albums (OCC)	4

=== Year-end charts ===
Year-end chart performance for Big Love
Chart (2015)	Position
Dutch Albums (Album Top 100)	71
UK Albums (OCC)	84

== Certifications ==
Certifications for Big Love
Region	Certification	Certified units/sales
United Kingdom (BPI)	Gold	100,000^{‡}
^{‡} Sales+streaming figures based on certification alone.
