= Home (Simply Red album) =

Studio album by Simply Red
- Released: 24 March 2003
- Recorded: 2001–2002
- Studio: Mick Hucknall's home studio; PFL Studios and Metropolis Mastering (London, UK); Ocean Way Recording (Hollywood, California)
- Genre: Soul; adult contemporary; pop
- Length: 43:20
- Label: Simplyred.com
- Producer: Mick Hucknall; Gota Yashiki; Peter Lewinson; Steve Lewinson; Andy Wright; Stewart Levine

Simply Red chronology
It's Only Love (2000)	Home (2003)	Simplified (2005)

Singles from Home
- 1. "Sunrise" Released: 17 March 2003; 2. "Fake" Released: 7 July 2003; 3. "You Make Me Feel Brand New" Released: 10 November 2003; 4. "Home" Released: 29 March 2004

Home is the eighth studio album by British pop and soul band Simply Red, released in 2003. It is the first Simply Red album released on band frontman Mick Hucknall's own record label, Simplyred.com. The album was a success all around the world, and includes the hit singles, "Sunrise", "Fake", "You Make Me Feel Brand New" and "Home".

The album includes three cover versions: the Bob Dylan song, "Positively 4th Street", The Stylistics' soul hit, "You Make Me Feel Brand New", and the Dennis Brown song, "Money in My Pocket". "Sunrise" borrows a loop from the 1981 Hall & Oates song "I Can't Go for That (No Can Do)", as well as some of the lyrics.

== Critical reception ==
Professional ratings
Review scores
Source	Rating
AllMusic	2/5 stars
Dotmusic	6/10
entertainment.ie	2/5 stars
The Guardian	3/5 stars
Rolling Stone	2/5 stars
Uncut	0.5/5 stars

Caroline Sullivan from The Guardian described Home as "luxuriant" and "accomplished," praising Mick Hucknall for staying true to Simply Red's signature "cappuccino-soul" style while still sounding "angelically" refined. She concluded that the album proves "there is life in the old haircut yet," highlighting its polished mix of white funk, R&B influences, and elegant cover versions. Dotmusic editor Gary Crossing praised Hucknall's "superb voice" and acknowledged his long record of pop classics, noting that even if his songwriting is uneven, his best work remains memorable. He ultimately concluded that the album is "not the finest of offerings," but still contains "plenty here to remind us of why we loved the man and his voice in the first place."

Michael Hubbard, writing for musicOMH, described Home as "business as usual," noting that Simply Red continue to rely on their familiar "pop-tinged soul-ballad" formula that has long defined their success. He acknowledged that while the album is "not the best work" the band has ever produced, it nonetheless demonstrates Hucknall's distinctive place in pop music and features moments of polished, well-crafted production. Rolling Stone's Richard Abowitz argued that while Hucknall's long experience with Simply Red occasionally shines through on Home, particularly on tracks such as "Fake" and "Home Loan Blues," the album is ultimately uneven and lacking inspiration. He criticized the reliance on sampling and cover versions as "pointless" or "embarrassing," concluding that Hucknall "would do better to ignore the comforts of Home next time and instead just get more lost."

== Commercial performance ==
Home achieved greater commercial success than Simply Red's previous studio album, Love and the Russian Winter (1999), particularly in terms of international chart performance, longevity, and overall sales. Whereas Love and the Russian Winter reached the top ten in a limited number of European territories and appeared on only two year-end charts, Home charted more extensively across Europe and internationally, including entries in Australia, New Zealand, and the United States.

The album reached number one on the Italian Albums Chart and peaked within the top ten in several countries, including Austria, France, Germany, Portugal, Switzerland, and the United Kingdom. It additionally reached number two on both the Dutch Albums Chart and the UK Albums Chart. Home also demonstrated stronger year-end chart performance. In 2003, the album reached number three on the Italian year-end chart and number seven in the Netherlands, while also placing within the top fifty in Germany, Switzerland, Austria, and the United Kingdom.

The album additionally surpassed its predecessor in certifications and sales. Home received double platinum certifications in both the Netherlands and the United Kingdom, platinum certification in Germany, and gold certifications in Austria, Belgium, Canada, France, Portugal, Russia, and Switzerland. The International Federation of the Phonographic Industry (IFPI) further certified the album platinum for shipments exceeding one million copies across Europe. Worldwide sales were estimated at approximately 2.5 million copies.

== Track listing ==
Standard version
No.	Title	Writer(s)	Producer(s)	Length
1.	"Home"	Mick Hucknall; Steve Lewinson; Peter Lewinson	Hucknall; S. Lewinson; P. Lewinson	3:17
2.	"Fake"	Hucknall; Mark Jaimes; Gota Yashiki; Ian Kirkham; S. Lewinson; Dee Johnson; John Johnson; Kenji Suzuki; Sarah Brown; Chris De'Margary; Kevin Robinson	Hucknall; Yashiki; Matt Rowe^{[a]}	3:58
3.	"Sunrise"	Hucknall; Daryl Hall; John Oates; Sara Allen	Andy Wright; Hucknall^{[b]}; Yashiki^{[b]}	3:19
4.	"You Make Me Feel Brand New"	Thom Bell; Linda Creed	Stewart Levine; Hucknall^{[a]}; Yashiki^{[a]}	5:05
5.	"Home Loan Blues"	Hucknall; Jaimes; Yashiki; S. Lewinson; Kirkham; Suzuki	Hucknall; Yashiki	5:00
6.	"Positively 4th Street"	Bob Dylan	Hucknall; Yashiki	4:33
7.	"Lost Weekend"	Hucknall	Hucknall; Yashiki	4:05
8.	"Money in My Pocket" (Plan B mix)	Joe Gibbs; Dennis Brown	Wright; Yashiki; Hucknall	3:38
9.	"Something for You"	Hucknall; Joe Sample	Levine; Hucknall^{[a]}; Yashiki^{[a]}	5:59
10.	"It's You"	Hucknall	Hucknall; Yashiki	3:15
11.	"Home (Reprise)"	Hucknall	Hucknall; Yashiki	0:53

Japanese version bonus track
No.	Title	Writer(s)	Producer(s)	Length
12.	"Money in My Pocket"	Gibbs; Brown	Hucknall; Yashiki	2:58

=== Limited edition DVD ===
1. "You Make Me Feel Brand New" (live DVD footage)
2. "Lost Weekend" (live DVD footage)
3. Documentary (DVD footage)
4. "Fake" (single mix)
5. "Sunrise (Who Knows About Forever)"

=== 2014 expanded edition ===
Disc one – Radio Edits

12. "Sunrise (Motivo Hi-Lectro Radio Edit/Mix)" – 3:26
13. "Fake (Radio Mix)" – 3:43
14. "You Make Me Feel Brand New (Single Edit)" – 4:18
15. "Home (Tin Tin Out Radio Mix)" – 3:34
16. "Fake (Phunk Investigation Radio Edit)" – 3:01
17. "You Make Me Feel Brand New (Antillas Full Vocal Edit)" – 4:14
18. "Home (Motivo Hi-lectro Radio Mix)" – 3:23

Disc two – Remixes

1. "Sunrise (ATFC Morning Glory Remix)" – 8:29
2. "Fake (Phunk Investigation Exte-Club Mix)" – 7:03
3. "Home (David Harness Taboo Vocal)" – 8:00
4. "Sunrise (Love to Infinity Classic Mix)" – 6:49
5. "Fake (Love to Infinity Classic Radio Mix)" – 4:34
6. "You Make Me Feel Brand New (Love to Infinity Radio Mix)" – 4:46
7. "Fake (Eric Kupper Club Mix)" – 6:51
8. "Sunrise (Love to Infinity Club Mix)" – 7:51
9. "Fake (Love to Infinity Club Mix)" – 6:58
10. "You Make Me Feel Brand New (Love to Infinity Master Mix)" – 6:04
11. "Home (Minimal Chic Mix)" – 6:47
12. "Sunrise (Who Knows About Forever?)" – 3:15

Disc three – Live at Ronnie Scott's (Recorded February 2003)

1. "Fake" – 3:52
2. "You Make Me Feel Brand New" – 4:57
3. "Positively 4th Street" – 4:27
4. "Home Loan Blues" – 4:51
5. "Home" – 3:30
6. "So Beautiful" – 4:57
7. "It's Only Love" – 4:29
8. "Come to My Aid" – 4:06
9. "Sunrise" – 3:23
10. "Lost Weekend" – 3:59
11. "Money in My Pocket" – 3:33
12. "Something for You" – 6:23
13. "Home (Live in Sicily)" (bonus track) – 3:46

DVD

Feature interview

1. "Mark Goodier Interviews Mick Hucknall About "Home" – March 2014"

Promo videos

2. "Sunrise"
3. "Fake"
4. "You Make Me Feel Brand New (Live)"
5. "Home"

Bonus features

6. "Home Album EPK"
7. "The Making of Sunrise"
8. "The Making of Fake"

BBC TV appearances

9. "Sunrise" (Parkinson, broadcast on 22 February 2003)
10. "Fake" (Later... with Jools Holland, broadcast on 20 June 2003)

Notes

- "Sunrise" contains extracts from "I Can't Go for That (No Can Do)", written by Daryl Hall, John Oates, and Sara Allen.
- ^{^[a]} signifies an additional producer
- ^{^[b]} signifies an original producer

== Personnel ==
=== Musicians ===
The album credits list the musicians who played on the record, with no indication of which musicians played on which tracks, or what instruments they played.

Credited musicians are (in order listed): Andy Wright, Anthea Clarke, Arthur Adams, Bernie Worrell, Chris De Margary, Danny Saxon, Dave Clayton, Dean Parks, Dee Johnson, Freddie Washington, Gota Yashiki, Ian Kirkham, James Gadson, Joe Sample, John Johnson, Karl Van Den Bossche, Kenji Suzuki, Kevin Robinson, Larry Williams, Lenny Castro, The London Session Orchestra, Mark Jaimes, Mick Hucknall, Miles Bould, Paul "Harry" Harris, Pete Lewinson, Sarah Brown and Steve Lewinson.

=== Production ===
Technical

- Michael Zimmerling – recording engineer (1, 2, 5–8, 11)
- Rik Pekkonen – recording engineer (4, 9)
- Andy Scade – recording assistant (1, 2, 5–8, 11)
- Johnny Wow – mixing (1, 4–7, 10)
- Steve Fitzmaurice – mixing (2)
- Andy Wright – mixing (3, 8)
- Madkap – mixing (3)
- Mark Jolley – mixing (3)
- John Lee – assistant mix engineer (1, 2, 4–7, 9, 10)

Album credits

- Peacock Design – art direction, design
- Rick Guest – photography
- Andy Earl – band photography
- Hugh Turvey – photography (pages 5 & 6)
- Gusto – photography (pages 5 & 6)

== Charts ==
=== Weekly charts ===
Weekly chart performance for Home
Chart (2003–2004)	Peak position
Australian Albums (ARIA)	15
Austrian Albums (Ö3 Austria)	8
Belgian Albums (Ultratop Flanders)	15
Belgian Albums (Ultratop Wallonia)	11
Danish Albums (Hitlisten)	20
Dutch Albums (Album Top 100)	2
Finnish Albums (Suomen virallinen lista)	34
French Albums (SNEP)	8
German Albums (Offizielle Top 100)	5
Italian Albums (FIMI)	1
New Zealand Albums (RMNZ)	19
Portuguese Albums (AFP)	5
Swedish Albums (Sverigetopplistan)	40
Swiss Albums (Schweizer Hitparade)	6
UK Albums (OCC)	2
US Billboard 200	187

=== Year-end charts ===
2003 year-end chart performance for Home
Chart (2003)	Position
Austrian Albums (Ö3 Austria)	50
Belgian Albums (Ultratop Wallonia)	59
Dutch Albums (Album Top 100)	7
French Albums (SNEP)	124
German Albums (Offizielle Top 100)	14
Italian Albums (FIMI)	3
Swiss Albums (Schweizer Hitparade)	26
UK Albums (OCC)	26

2004 year-end chart performance for Home
Chart (2004)	Position
Dutch Albums (Album Top 100)	27

== Certifications ==
Certifications and sales for Home
Region	Certification	Certified units/sales
Austria (IFPI Austria)	Gold	15,000^{*}
Belgium (BRMA)	Gold	25,000^{*}
Canada (Music Canada)	Gold	50,000^{^}
France (SNEP)	Gold	100,000^{*}
Germany (BVMI)	Platinum	200,000^{^}
Netherlands (NVPI)	2× Platinum	160,000^{^}
Portugal (AFP)	Gold	20,000^{^}
Russia (NFPF)	Gold	10,000^{*}
Switzerland (IFPI Switzerland)	Gold	20,000^{^}
United Kingdom (BPI)	2× Platinum	600,000^{^}
Summaries
Europe (IFPI)	Platinum	1,000,000^{*}
Worldwide	—N/a	2,500,000
^{*} Sales figures based on certification alone.^{^} Shipments figures based on certification alone.
