= Blue Eyed Soul (album) =

Studio album by Simply Red
- Released: 8 November 2019
- Studios: Mick Hucknall's home studio; British Grove and Southwest (London, England)
- Genre: Blue-eyed soul
- Length: 33:53
- Label: BMG
- Producer: Andy Wright

Simply Red chronology
Symphonica in Rosso – Live at Ziggo Dome, Amsterdam (2018)	Blue Eyed Soul (2019)	Time (2023)

Singles from Blue Eyed Soul
- 1. "Thinking of You" Released: 15 August 2019; 2. "BadBootz" Released: 13 September 2019; 3. "Sweet Child" Released: 30 September 2019; 4. "Complete Love" Released: 24 October 2019; 5. "Tonight (0AM Mix)" Released: 18 February 2020

Blue Eyed Soul is the twelfth studio album by British pop group Simply Red. The album was released on 8 November 2019 by BMG.

== Chart performance ==
The album debuted at number six on the UK Albums Chart, selling 9,772 copies in its first week. It is Simply Red's 14th top 10 album in the United Kingdom.

== Track listing ==
The vinyl release has a slightly different song order from the CD and digital releases. Hucknall's preferred order is that of the vinyl release, which moves the final song "Tonight" to the end of side one.

=== CD and digital download version ===
All tracks are written by Mick Hucknall.

Disc one
No.	Title	Length
1.	"Thinking of You"	3:12
2.	"Sweet Child"	3:18
3.	"Complete Love"	3:28
4.	"Take a Good Look"	3:19
5.	"Ring That Bell"	3:38
6.	"BadBootz"	3:40
7.	"Don't Do Down"	3:18
8.	"Riding on a Train"	3:08
9.	"Chula"	3:17
10.	"Tonight"	3:35
Total length:		33:53

Disc two – deluxe version (bonus tracks)
No.	Title	Length
1.	"Thinking of You" (original version)	3:13
2.	"Sweet Child" (original version)	3:26
3.	"Thinking of You" (Danny Trexin remix)	2:30
4.	"Thinking of You" (James Doman remix)	5:00
5.	"Sweet Child" (Crooked Soul remix)	7:11

=== LP version ===
All tracks are written by Mick Hucknall.

Side one
No.	Title	Length
1.	"Thinking of You"	3:12
2.	"Sweet Child"	3:18
3.	"Complete Love"	3:28
4.	"Take a Good Look"	3:19
5.	"Tonight"	3:35

Side two
No.	Title	Length
1.	"Ring That Bell"	3:38
2.	"BadBootz"	3:40
3.	"Don't Do Down"	3:18
4.	"Riding on a Train"	3:08
5.	"Chula"	3:17
Total length:		33:53

== Personnel ==
Simply Red

- Mick Hucknall – vocals, backing vocals (5, 6, 8)
- Dave Clayton – keyboards, backing vocals (5, 6, 8)
- Kenji Suzuki – guitars, backing vocals (5, 6, 8)
- Steve Lewinson – bass
- Roman Roth – drums, backing vocals (5, 6, 8)
- Ian Kirkham – saxophones
- Kevin Robinson – trumpet, backing vocals (1, 5–8), percussion (5, 6, 8, 9)

Additional musicians

- Danny Saxon – additional keyboards (1–3, 7)
- Andy Wright – programming, additional keyboards (1, 5, 8, 9), percussion (5, 6, 8, 9)
- Gavin Goldberg – programming, additional guitars (1)
- Peter-John Vettese – string programming (10), arrangements (10)
- Mark Jaimes – additional guitars (1–3, 7)
- Marc JB – additional beats (1)
- Chris De Margary – saxophones

Strings (Tracks 2–4)

- Peter-John Vettese – arrangements (2, 3)
- Sam Swallow – arrangements (4)
- Amy Stewart – string contractor for Isobel Griffiths Ltd.
- Dave Daniels – cello
- Peter Lale and Bruce White – viola
- Ian Humphries, Patrick Kiernan, Everton Nelson and Emlyn Singleton – violin

Production

- Andy Wright – producer
- Gavin Goldberg – engineer, mixing (1), additional mixing
- Mick Hucknall – mixing (2–10)
- Lewis Chapman – assistant engineer, mix engineer
- Tony Cousins – mastering at Metropolis Mastering (London, UK)
- Stuart Crouch Creative – design, cover illustration
- Dean Chalkley – photography

== Charts ==
Chart performance for Blue Eyed Soul
Chart (2019)	Peak position
Australian Digital Albums (ARIA)	39
Austrian Albums (Ö3 Austria)	5
Belgian Albums (Ultratop Flanders)	28
Belgian Albums (Ultratop Wallonia)	35
Dutch Albums (Album Top 100)	27
French Albums (SNEP)	57
German Albums (Offizielle Top 100)	11
Italian Albums (FIMI)	24
Polish Albums (ZPAV)	21
Scottish Albums (Official Charts)	7
Swiss Albums (Schweizer Hitparade)	17
UK Albums (Official Charts)	6
