= Time (Simply Red album) =

Studio album by Simply Red
- Released: 26 May 2023
- Studios: Mick Hucknall's home studio; The Qube and Maida Vale Studios (London, UK)
- Genres: Soul pop; smooth jazz; soft rock
- Length: 39:03
- Label: Warner Music
- Producers: Andy Wright; Gavin Goldberg

Simply Red chronology
Blue Eyed Soul (2019)	Time (2023)	Recollections (2025)

Singles from Time
- 1. "Better with You" Released: 2 March 2023; 2. "Shades 22" Released: 31 March 2023; 3. "Just Like You" Released: 27 April 2023; 4. "It Wouldn't Be Me" Released: 18 August 2023

Time is the thirteenth studio album by British pop group Simply Red, released on 26 May 2023 through Warner Music. It was produced by Andy Wright, preceded by the singles "Better with You", "Shades 22" and "Just Like You" and followed by the single "It Wouldn't Be Me", which included a new "Single Mix" of the song. The band performed at the O2 Shepherd's Bush Empire on 5 June 2023 to celebrate the album's launch, as well as continuing their tour of Europe in mid-2023. It is their last album that features bassist Steve Lewinson who died in December 2024.

== Background and recording ==
The album's lyrics have been described as "confessional", with Mick Hucknall stating: "When we were in lockdown, I went, 'well, jeez, who am I actually? What makes me tick?' And I realised: 'you are a songwriter. So why don't you write some songs about who you are?' That's really the essence of this album." The album was recorded in London with the band's long-time producer Andy Wright, with the resulting sound described as a mix of "soul, funk, R&B and blues".

== Track listing ==
All tracks are written by Mick Hucknall.

Time track listing
No.	Title	Length
1.	"Better with You"	3:20
2.	"Just Like You"	3:05
3.	"Let Your Hair Down"	3:23
4.	"Shades 22"	3:45
5.	"It Wouldn't Be Me"	3:00
6.	"Never Be Gone"	2:49
7.	"Too Long at the Fair"	2:58
8.	"Slapbang"	2:14
9.	"Hey Mister"	3:26
10.	"Just Like You, Pt. 2"	4:29
11.	"Butterflies"	3:19
12.	"Earth in a Lonely Space"	3:15
Total length:		39:03

CD deluxe edition bonus tracks (Time: BBC Live Session)
No.	Title	Writer(s)	Length
13.	"You Make Me Feel Brand New"	Thom Bell; Linda Creed	5:04
14.	"Better with You"	Hucknall	3:21
15.	"My Love"	Paul McCartney; Linda McCartney	4:02

== Personnel ==
Simply Red

- Mick Hucknall – vocals, backing vocals, guitars, bass, harmonica
- Gary Sanctuary – acoustic piano (13–15)
- Kenji Suzuki – guitars
- Steve Lewinson – bass
- Roman Roth – drums
- Ian Kirkham – saxophones, woodwinds, electronic wind instrument, brass
- Kevin Robinson – trumpet

Additional musicians

- Dave Clayton – keyboards, acoustic piano, organ
- Gavin Goldberg – keyboards, acoustic piano, Wurlitzer electric piano, organ, programming, strings, guitars, bass, drum programming, bassoon
- Danny Saxon – keyboards, acoustic piano, synthesizers, organ, programming, strings, bongos, backing vocals
- Andy Wright – keyboards, acoustic piano, Wurlitzer electric piano, synthesizers, organ, programming, strings, guitars, bass, harp, drum programming, bongos, backing vocals
- Mark Jaimes – synthesizers, programming, guitars, bass, bongos
- Marek Bero – bass
- Geoff Holroyde – percussion
- Daniel Westron – percussion
- BBC Concert Orchestra – orchestra (13–15)
- Sam Swallow – orchestra arrangements (13–15)

=== Production ===
- Andy Wright – producer, recording, engineer
- Gavin Goldberg – additional producer, engineer, mixing
- Dan Roberts – producer (13–15)
- Lewis Chapman – engineer
- Jamie Hart – engineer (13–15)
- Jean-Pierre Chablos – mastering at La Source Mastering (Paris, France)
- Stuart Crouch Creative – art direction, design
- Vincent Barker – photography
- Simon Fowler – photography
- Christie Goodwin – photography
- Bob King – photography

== Charts ==
Chart performance for Time
Chart (2023)	Peak position
Austrian Albums (Ö3 Austria)	7
Belgian Albums (Ultratop Flanders)	79
Belgian Albums (Ultratop Wallonia)	47
Croatian International Albums (HDU)	12
Dutch Albums (Album Top 100)	26
French Albums (SNEP)	83
German Albums (Offizielle Top 100)	9
Hungarian Albums (MAHASZ)	4
Italian Albums (FIMI)	63
Polish Albums (ZPAV)	31
Portuguese Albums (AFP)	37
Scottish Albums (Official Charts)	4
Spanish Albums (Promusicae)	90
Swiss Albums (Schweizer Hitparade)	11
UK Albums (Official Charts)	8
