= Simplified (album) =

Studio album by Simply Red
- Released: 17 October 2005
- Recorded: 2004–2005
- Studio: Mick Hucknall's home studio; Metropolis Studios (London, UK)
- Genre: Soul; soft rock
- Length: 49:14
- Label: Simplyred.com; Universal
- Producer: Andy Wright; Mark Jaimes; Danny Saxon; Mick Hucknall

Simply Red chronology
Home (2003)	Simplified (2005)	Stay (2007)

Singles from Simplified
- 1. "Perfect Love" Released: October 2005; 2. "A Song for You" Released: January 2006

Simplified is the ninth studio album by Simply Red, released in October 2005. It features new, rearranged recordings of the band's older songs, and four new songs: "Perfect Love" and an alternate version, "My Perfect Love", a cover of Leon Russell's "A Song for You", and "Smile".

== Track listing ==
- Credits adapted from Simply Red's official website.

All tracks are written by Mick Hucknall, except where noted.

Standard version
No.	Title	Writer(s)	Producer(s)	Length
1.	"Perfect Love"		Andy Wright; Mark Jaimes; Danny Saxon; Hucknall^{[a]}	3:12
2.	"Something Got Me Started"	Hucknall; Fritz McIntyre	Wright; Jaimes; Saxon	3:45
3.	"Holding Back the Years"		Wright; Jaimes; Saxon; Hucknall^{[a]}	4:19
4.	"More"		Hucknall	4:19
5.	"A Song for You"	Leon Russell	Hucknall	4:08
6.	"Your Mirror"		Hucknall	4:14
7.	"Fairground"		Hucknall	5:14
8.	"My Perfect Love"		Hucknall	3:38
9.	"Smile"	Hucknall; Ian Kirkham	Hucknall	3:10
10.	"Sad Old Red"		Hucknall	5:45
11.	"For Your Babies"		Hucknall	4:24
12.	"Ev'ry Time We Say Goodbye"	Cole Porter	Hucknall	3:06

=== 2014 expanded edition ===
'Disc 2

Remixes

1. "Perfect Love (Lazy Radio Mix)" – 3:11
2. "Perfect Love (Love To Infinity Sunset Mix – Long Version)" – 7:43
3. "Perfect Love (Love To Infinity Radio Mix)" – 3:33
4. "Perfect Love (Kurtis Mantronik 12" Vocal Mix)" – 6:16
5. "Perfect Love (Motive Hi-lectro Mix)" – 6:30
6. "Perfect Love (Roger's Dirty Sanchez Mix Edit)" – 6:43
7. "Perfect Love (Lee Cabrera's Lower East Side Dub)" – 6:00

Live in Cuba

8. "Perfect Love" – 3:26
9. "Something Got Me Started" – 3:37
10. "A Song for You" – 4:09
11. "Stars" – 4:17
12. "It's Only Love" – 4:30
13. "Fairground" – 6:00

DVD

Feature Interview

1. "Mark Goodier Interviews Mick Hucknall About "Simplified" March 2014"

Promo videos

2. "Perfect Love"
3. "Something Got Me Started"
4. "A Song for You"

BBC TV Appearances

5. "Perfect Love (Top of the Tops)"
6. "Something Got Me Started (All Time Greatest Party Songs)"

Notes

- ^{^[a]} signifies an additional producer

== Personnel ==
=== Musicians ===
The album credits alphabetically list the musicians who played on the record, with no indication of which musicians played on which tracks, or what instruments they played.

Credited musicians are: Sarah Brown, Anthea Clarke, Dave Clayton, Simon Hale, Geoff Holroyde, Mark Jamies, Dee Johnson, John Johnson, Ian Kirkham, Pete Lewinson, Steve Lewinson, Chris De Margary, Roachie, Kevin Robinson, Danny Saxon, Kenji Suzuki, Andy Wright, Gota Yashiki.

Danae Blanco Villanueva – guest vocals on "Perfect Love"

Oddly, Mick Hucknall is not listed in the album's musician credits.

=== Production ===
- Johnny Wow – mixing
- Kevin Metcalfe – mastering at The Soundmasters (London, UK)
- Andy Scade – recording, album technical coordinator
- Dave Bloor – recording (1, 2, 3)
- Gavin Goldberg – recording (1, 2, 3)
- Michael Zimmerling – recording (1, 4–12)
- Peacock Design – art direction, design
- Hamish Brown – band photography
- Hugh Turvey – photography

== Singles ==
- "Perfect Love" (October 2005)
- "Something Got Me Started" / "A Song for You" (January 2006)
- "More" (November 2005) – for Brazilian market

== Charts ==
=== Weekly charts ===
Weekly chart performance for Simplified
Chart (2005)	Peak position
Austrian Albums (Ö3 Austria)	2
Belgian Albums (Ultratop Flanders)	14
Belgian Albums (Ultratop Wallonia)	37
Danish Albums (Hitlisten)	40
Dutch Albums (Album Top 100)	10
French Albums (SNEP)	64
German Albums (Offizielle Top 100)	4
Italian Albums (FIMI)	4
Swedish Albums (Sverigetopplistan)	47
Swiss Albums (Schweizer Hitparade)	3
UK Albums (OCC)	3

=== Year-end charts ===
2005 year-end chart performance for Simplified
Chart (2005)	Position
Austrian Albums (Ö3 Austria)	57
Swiss Albums (Schweizer Hitparade)	92
UK Albums (OCC)	114

== Certifications ==
Certifications and sales for Simplified
Region	Certification	Certified units/sales
United Kingdom (BPI)	Gold	100,000^{^}
^{^} Shipments figures based on certification alone.
