= Sylvan Richardson =

British guitarist, composer, and masseur (born 1965)

- Also known as: Sylvan Richardson Jr.
- Born: Sylvan B. Richardson; 1965 (age 60–61); Lambeth, London, England
- Genres: New wave, soul
- Occupation: Musician
- Instruments: Guitar, bass guitar
- Years active: 1985–present
- Formerly of: Simply Red

Sylvan Richardson is a British guitarist, composer, and masseur.

== Music ==
Best known for being the one-time guitarist of Simply Red, after the second album Men and Women and a successful world tour, Richardson left the band after becoming disillusioned with the industry. He then studied composition in New York City. Richardson went on to work with acts such as Andy Sheppard and girl group Cleopatra and many others, as a session bassist and band director.

Richardson has his own group The Sylvan Richardson Band, who are currently based in Manchester. In his spare time, he enjoys squash and Kung Fu.

== Masseur ==
Richardson has been a professional masseur since about 2005. In 2009 he made a guest appearance on the BBC comedy quiz show Would I Lie To You?, in which he revealed that he was cyclist Sir Chris Hoy's masseur. He was a masseur at Liverpool Football Club from 2010 to 2015.
