= Men and Women (album) =

Studio album by Simply Red
- Released: 9 March 1987
- Recorded: 1985–1986
- Studios: Yellow 2 Studios (Stockport, UK)
- Genres: Soul; funk
- Length: 41:07
- Labels: Elektra; WEA
- Producers: Alex Sadkin ("Ev'ry Time We Say Goodbye" produced by Mick Hucknall and Yvonne Ellis)

Simply Red chronology
| Picture Book (1985) | Men and Women (1987) | A New Flame (1989) |

Singles from Men and Women
- 1. "The Right Thing" Released: 2 February 1987; 2. "Infidelity" Released: 11 May 1987; 3. "Maybe Someday..." Released: 27 July 1987; 4. "Ev'ry Time We Say Goodbye" Released: 16 November 1987; 5. "I Won't Feel Bad" Released: 22 February 1988

Professional ratings
Review scores
| Source | Rating |
|---|---|
| AllMusic | 3/5 stars |
| Robert Christgau | B |
| Smash Hits | 9/10 |
| Los Angeles Times | (Positive) |
| The New York Times | (Positive) |
| The Rolling Stone Album Guide | 3/5 stars |

Men and Women is the second album by British pop and soul group Simply Red, released in 1987.

== Singles ==
Five singles were released from the album. "The Right Thing" was the first to be released, peaking at number 11 in the UK Singles Chart. "Infidelity" was the second single, which reached number 31, followed by "Maybe Someday..." which became Simply Red's first single to fail to reach the UK top 75, peaking at number 88. The next single, "Ev'ry Time We Say Goodbye", a cover of the Cole Porter song, returned the band to the top 20 where it peaked at number 11. "I Won’t Feel Bad" was the fifth and final single from the album, peaking at number 68 (although the song was originally released as the B-side of "Holding Back the Years" in 1985 and was credited to Stewart Levine as producer, and despite "I Won't Feel Bad" not having been rerecorded for Men and Women, Alex Sadkin receives production credit on the album and the single).

== Track listing ==
Side one
| No. | Title | Writer(s) | Length |
|---|---|---|---|
| 1. | "The Right Thing" | Mick Hucknall | 4:19 |
| 2. | "Infidelity" | Mick Hucknall, Lamont Dozier | 4:09 |
| 3. | "Suffer" | Mick Hucknall, Lamont Dozier | 4:55 |
| 4. | "I Won’t Feel Bad" | Mick Hucknall, Fritz McIntyre, Chris Joyce, Tony Bowers, Tim Kellett, Sylvan Richardson | 4:14 |
| 5. | "Ev'ry Time We Say Goodbye" | Cole Porter | 3:23 |

Side two
| No. | Title | Writer(s) | Length |
|---|---|---|---|
| 1. | "Let Me Have It All" | Sylvester Stewart | 3:45 |
| 2. | "Love Fire" | Bunny Wailer | 3:58 |
| 3. | "Move on Out" | Mick Hucknall | 4:55 |
| 4. | "Shine" | Mick Hucknall | 3:22 |
| 5. | "Maybe Someday..." | Mick Hucknall | 4:18 |

=== 2008 Collector's Edition bonus tracks ===
| No. | Title | Writer(s) | Length |
|---|---|---|---|
| 1. | "The Right Thing" (Extended Version) | Mick Hucknall | 5:36 |
| 2. | "Broken Man" (1987 Version) | Mick Hucknall | 4:00 |
| 3. | "Ev'ry Time We Say Goodbye" (Live Version) | Cole Porter | 3:42 |
| 4. | "Infidelity" (Stretch Mix) | Mick Hucknall, Lamont Dozier | 5:24 |
| 5. | "Love Fire" (Massive Red Mix) | Bunny Wailer | 5:22 |
| 6. | "Lady Godiva's Room" | Mick Hucknall | 2:54 |

== Personnel ==
Simply Red

- Mick Hucknall – lead vocals, backing vocals
- Fritz McIntyre – keyboards, backing vocals
- Tim Kellett – keyboards, trumpet, flugelhorn, percussion, live backing vocals
- Sylvan Richardson – guitars
- Tony Bowers – bass, percussion
- Chris Joyce – drums, percussion

Additional musicians

- Steve Rainford – keyboard programming
- Ian Kirkham – baritone saxophone, tenor saxophone
- Derek Wadsworth – trombone on "Love Fire"
- Eleanor Morris – cello on "Ev'ry Time We Say Goodbye"
- Janette Sewell – backing vocals

Production

- Alex Sadkin – producer (1–4, 6–10), mixing (1–4, 6–10)
- Mick Hucknall – producer (5)
- Yvonne Ellis – producer (5), engineer (5)
- Barry Mraz – engineer (1–4, 6–10), mixing (1–4, 7)
- Chris Dickie – assistant engineer (1–5, 7, 10), mixing (1–4, 7)
- Simon Sullivan – assistant engineer (6, 8, 9)
- Kevin Whyte – assistant engineer (6, 8, 9)
- Colin Andrews – assistant engineer (10)
- Joe Barbaria – mixing (6, 8, 9)
- Nick Launay – mixing (6, 8, 9)
- Ted Jensen – mastering
- Robert Erdmann – photography
- Paul Smith – clothes

Studios

- Recorded at Yellow 2 Studios (Stockport, UK)
- Tracks 1–4 and 7 mixed at RAK Studios (London, UK); Track 5 mixed at Yellow 2 Studios; Tracks 6, 8 and 9 mixed at Mayfair Studios (London, UK); Track 10 mixed at Utopia Studios (London, UK)
- Mastered at Sterling Sound (New York City, New York)

== Charts ==
=== Weekly charts ===
Weekly chart performance for Men and Women
| Chart (1987) | Peak position |
|---|---|
| Australian Albums (Kent Music Report) | 5 |
| Austrian Albums (Ö3 Austria) | 3 |
| Canada Top Albums/CDs (RPM) | 5 |
| Dutch Albums (Album Top 100) | 2 |
| European Albums (Music & Media) | 2 |
| Finnish Albums (Suomen virallinen lista) | 14 |
| German Albums (Offizielle Top 100) | 3 |
| Icelandic Albums (Tónlist) | 2 |
| Italian Albums (Musica e dischi) | 1 |
| Japanese Albums (Oricon) | 32 |
| New Zealand Albums (RMNZ) | 4 |
| Norwegian Albums (VG-lista) | 6 |
| Spanish Albums (AFYVE) | 3 |
| Swedish Albums (Sverigetopplistan) | 4 |
| Swiss Albums (Schweizer Hitparade) | 1 |
| UK Albums (Official Charts) | 2 |
| US Billboard 200 | 31 |

=== Year-end charts ===
Year-end chart performance for Men and Women
| Chart (1987) | Position |
|---|---|
| Australian Albums (Kent Music Report) | 8 |
| Austrian Albums (Ö3 Austria) | 11 |
| Canada Top Albums/CDs (RPM) | 32 |
| Dutch Albums (Album Top 100) | 16 |
| European Albums (Music & Media) | 10 |
| German Albums (Offizielle Top 100) | 12 |
| New Zealand Albums (RMNZ) | 13 |
| Swiss Albums (Schweizer Hitparade) | 13 |
| UK Albums (Gallup) | 19 |

== Certifications and sales ==
Certifications and sales for Men and Women
| Region | Certification | Certified units/sales |
|---|---|---|
| Austria (IFPI Austria) | Gold | 25,000^{*} |
| France (SNEP) | Gold | 100,000^{*} |
| Germany (BVMI) | Platinum | 500,000^{^} |
| Italy (FIMI) | Platinum | 200,000 |
| Netherlands (NVPI) | Gold | 50,000^{^} |
| New Zealand (RMNZ) | Platinum | 15,000^{^} |
| Spain (Promusicae) | Platinum | 100,000^{^} |
| Switzerland (IFPI Switzerland) | Gold | 25,000^{^} |
| United Kingdom (BPI) | 3× Platinum | 900,000^{^} |
^{*} Sales figures based on certification alone.^{^} Shipments figures based on certification alone.
