= Town & Country (Webb Wilder album) =

Studio album by Webb Wilder
- Released: 1995
- Label: Watermelon
- Producer: R. S. Field

Webb Wilder chronology
Doo Dad (1991)	Town & Country (1995)	Acres of Suede (1996)

Town & Country is an album by the American musician Webb Wilder, released in 1995. He is credited with the NashVegans. Town & Country was Wilder's first album for Watermelon Records. Wilder supported the album with a North American tour that included shows with Jason and the Scorchers.

== Production ==
Wilder decided to record an album of covers due to acquiring a new backing band. Produced by R. S. Field, Town & Country was recorded in Nashville between November 1994 and January 1995, in a garage and using vintage equipment. Wilder considered the album a celebration of regionalism and included a map detailing where the songs originated; he also thought it was his least slick album since his debut. "Talk Talk" is a cover of the Music Machine song. "I Ain't Living Long Like This" is a cover of the Rodney Crowell song. "My Mind's Eye" was written by the Small Faces. "Original Mixed-Up Kid" was originally performed by Mott the Hoople. "Nashville Bum" is a version of Waylon Jennings's first RCA single. "To the Loving Public" includes a monologue devoted to Wilder's musical philosophy.

== Critical reception ==
Professional ratings
Review scores
Source	Rating
AllMusic	2/5 stars
Edmonton Sun	3.5/5 stars
MusicHound Rock: The Essential Album Guide	3.5/5 stars
Orlando Sentinel	4/5 stars
The Philadelphia Inquirer	3/4 stars
Rolling Stone	3/5 stars

The Orlando Sentinel wrote that "Wilder's deep voice has a golden resonance on twangy numbers such as Waylon Jennings' 'Nashville Bum' and Harlan Howard's 'Too Many Rivers'." Trouser Press determined that the album, "a wide-ranging collection of covers, works beautifully... Wilder's at his authoritative best." Rolling Stone opined that Wilder "flat-out rocks... Suggesting a loopier Jason and the Scorchers, the Nash Vegans manhandle country rave-ups."

The Chicago Tribune deemed the album "a well-played if mildly interesting spin around his various influences, but Wilder's wiseacre delivery works better in a bar than in repeated listenings on disc." Stereo Review said that "Wilder's a gregarious type with a Foghorn Leghorn bellow of a voice, his band's equally adept at twang and thrash, and the songs they've chosen are, for the most part. worth reviving." The Press-Telegram noted that the songs are delivered in "a big, bawdy, beefy style by a mess of expert musicians."

AllMusic wrote that "the disc falters mostly by Webb's own high standards; overall, these sessions still make decent, high-volume highway accompaniment."

== Track listing ==
No.	Title	Length
1.	"Stay Out of Automobiles"
2.	"Nashville Bum"
3.	"Slow Death"
4.	"(I'm a) Lover Not a Fighter"
5.	"To the Loving Public"
6.	"Honky Tonk Hell"
7.	"My Mind's Eye"
8.	"Too Many Rivers"
9.	"Goldfinger"
10.	"Hissy-Fit"
11.	"Talk Talk"
12.	"Streets of Laredo (The Cowboy's Lament)"
13.	"Short on Love"
14.	"I Ain't Living Long Like This"
15.	"Original Mixed-Up Kid"
16.	"Rockin' Little Angel"
