= Hybrid Vigor (album) =

Studio album by Webb Wilder
- Released: 1989
- Genre: Rock and roll, hard rock, roots rock
- Label: Island
- Producer: Bobby Field

Webb Wilder chronology
It Came from Nashville (1986)	Hybrid Vigor (1989)	Doo Dad (1991)

Hybrid Vigor is the second album by the American musician Webb Wilder, released in 1989. Wilder supported the album by touring with the Georgia Satellites. The first single was "Human Cannonball", which was a hit on college radio.

== Production ==
The album was produced by R.S. "Bobby" Field. The majority of the songs were written by Wilder and Field. Wilder aimed to make a commercial album that did not betray the sound of his debut; he also wanted to use his bigger budget to experiment in the studio. "Louisiana Hannah" is a cover of the Larry Williams song. "Ain't That a Lot of Love" is a cover of the song made famous by Sam & Dave.

== Critical reception ==
Professional ratings
Review scores
Source	Rating
AllMusic	3/5 stars
Chicago Tribune	3/4 stars
MusicHound Rock: The Essential Album Guide	3/5 stars
Ottawa Citizen	2/5 stars
The Rolling Stone Album Guide	3/5 stars

The Chicago Tribune deemed the album "glorious rock 'n' roll for the misanthrope in all of us." The Ottawa Citizen wrote that "Wilder has an uncontrolled B-movie mentality that takes his Chuck Berry licks through detective thriller and Sci-Fi territory." The Edmonton Journal called Hybrid Vigor "snappy, off-the-wall, way cool hard rock written by people who know the definition of irony but also know when to lay off and simply turn the volume up." Trouser Press panned the often "hellish metal-country experiment."

The Globe and Mail determined that "Webb sound[s] fresh in comparison to all those other grave-robbing, heritage-hawking roots rockers." The Vancouver Sun considered it "a pedal-to-the-metal blast of trashed-up rhythm and boozy rock, all nasty licks and hilarious little lyrics." The Houston Chronicle noted that the album "threatens to out-Stone the Stones with its raunchy, twangy, hard-charging attack that adds up to pure unadulterated rock 'n' roll."

== Track listing ==
No.	Title	Length
1.	"Hittin' Where It Hurts"
2.	"Human Cannonball"
3.	"Do You Know Something (I Don't Know)"
4.	"Cold Front"
5.	"Safeside"
6.	"Wild Honey"
7.	"What's Got Wrong with You?"
8.	"Ain't That a Lot of Love"
9.	"Skeleton Crew"
10.	"Louisiana Hannah"
