= Love and the Russian Winter =

Studio album by Simply Red
- Released: 1 November 1999
- Studio: Westpoint Recording Studios, Metropolis Studios and The Town House (London, UK)
- Length: 47:31
- Label: East West
- Producer: Gota Yashiki; Andy Wright; Mick Hucknall

Simply Red chronology
| Blue (1998) | Love and the Russian Winter (1999) | It's Only Love (2000) |

Singles from Love and the Russian Winter
- 1. "Ain't That a Lot of Love" Released: 18 October 1999; 2. "Your Eyes" Released: February 2000

Professional ratings
Review scores
| Source | Rating |
|---|---|
| AllMusic | link |

Love and the Russian Winter is the seventh studio album by British pop and soul group Simply Red, released on 1 November 1999. It marks a distinct change from the band's preceding albums, featuring a more computer-generated sound. The album was released mainly due to pressure from their record label to fulfil their contract. It features a cover version of "Ain't That a Lot of Love", written by Willia Dean Parker and Homer Banks.

== Track listing ==
All tracks written by Mick Hucknall, except where noted. All tracks produced by Andy Wright, Gota Yashiki and Mick Hucknall. Additional production on "Your Eyes" by Merv Pearson.

1. "The Spirit of Life" – 4:42
2. "Ain't That a Lot of Love" (Willia Dean Parker, Homer Banks) – 3:56
3. "Your Eyes" – 4:15
4. "The Sky Is a Gypsy" – 4:33
5. "Back into the Universe" – 3:48
6. "Words for Girlfriends" – 5:07
7. "Thank You" – 4:01
8. "Man Made the Gun" – 4:58
9. "Close to You" – 4:33
10. "More Than a Dream" – 3:52
11. "Wave the Old World Goodbye" – 3:46

Japan Edition

1. "The Spirit of Life" – 4:42
2. "Ain't That a Lot of Love" – 3:56
3. "Your Eyes" – 4:15
4. "The Sky Is a Gypsy" – 4:33
5. "Back into the Universe" – 3:48
6. "Words for Girlfriends" – 5:07
7. "Thank You" – 4:01
8. "Man Made the Gun" – 4:58
9. "Close to You" – 4:33
10. "Come on in My Kitchen" (Bonus track)
11. "More Than a Dream" – 3:52
12. "Wave the Old World Goodbye" – 3:46

=== 2008 Special Edition bonus tracks ===
12. "Ain't That a Lot of Love" (Phats & Small Mutant Disco Vocal Mix) – 6:08
13. "Ain't That a Lot of Love" (Club 69 Underground Dub Mx) – 6:36
14. "Your Eyes" (Mousse T Acoustic) – 3:54
15. "Your Eyes" (Ignorants Remix) – 4:41
16. "Your Eyes" (Jimmy Gomez Funky Mix) – 7:06

== Personnel ==
Simply Red

- Mick Hucknall – lead vocals, backing vocals, horn arrangements
- Tim Vine – keyboards, bass
- Andy Wright – keyboards, programming, bass
- Mark Jaimes – guitars
- Gota Yashiki – bass, drums, programming
- Ian Kirkham – saxophones
- John Johnson – trombone
- Kevin Robinson – trumpet
- Sarah Brown – backing vocals
- Dee Johnson – backing vocals

Additional musicians

- Dominic "Dom T." Thrup – keyboards
- Aiden Love – keyboards
- Phillipe Manjard – keyboards
- James Wiltshire – keyboards, programming
- Ned Douglas – programming
- Merv Pearson – programming (3)
- Greg Bone – guitars
- Kenji Suzuki – guitars
- Wayne Stobbart –bass
- Geoff Holroyde – drums
- Chris De Margary – saxophones, flute

Production

- AGM – producers
- Merv Pearson – additional production (3)
- Alistair Clay – recording
- Alan Douglas – recording
- John Lee – recording
- Mak Togashi – recording, assistant engineer
- Matt White – recording, assistant engineer
- James Wiltshire – recording
- Emily Cracknell – assistant engineer
- Andy Saunders – assistant engineer
- Matt Tait – assistant engineer
- Josh T – assistant engineer
- Kevin Metcalfe – mastering
- Peacock – artwork, photographic treatment
- Mick Hucknall – original artwork concept
- Rick Guest – band photography
- Idea – photographic treatment

Studios

- Recorded at Westpoint Recording Studios, Metropolis Studios and The Town House (London, UK).
- Mastered at The Soundmasters (London, UK).

== Charts ==
=== Weekly charts ===
Weekly chart performance for Love and the Russian Winter
| Chart (1999) | Peak position |
|---|---|
| Austrian Albums (Ö3 Austria) | 3 |
| Dutch Albums (Album Top 100) | 41 |
| French Albums (SNEP) | 57 |
| German Albums (Offizielle Top 100) | 2 |
| Italian Albums (FIMI) | 15 |
| Scottish Albums (OCC) | 50 |
| Swedish Albums (Sverigetopplistan) | 31 |
| Swiss Albums (Schweizer Hitparade) | 8 |
| UK Albums (OCC) | 6 |

=== Year-end charts ===
1999 year-end chart performance for Love and the Russian Winter
| Chart (1999) | Position |
|---|---|
| German Albums (Offizielle Top 100) | 95 |
| UK Albums (OCC) | 62 |

== Certifications ==
Sales and certifications for Love and the Russian Winter
| Region | Certification | Certified units/sales |
|---|---|---|
| Austria (IFPI Austria) | Gold | 25,000^{*} |
| Germany (BVMI) | Platinum | 300,000^{^} |
| United Kingdom (BPI) | Platinum | 300,000^{^} |
^{*} Sales figures based on certification alone.^{^} Shipments figures based on certification alone.
