= Doo Dad =

Studio album by Webb Wilder
- Released: 1991
- Genres: Roots rock, rock, blues rock
- Label: Praxis/Zoo
- Producer: R. S. Field

Webb Wilder chronology
| Hybrid Vigor (1989) | Doo Dad (1991) | Town & Country (1995) |

Doo Dad is an album by the American roots rock musician Webb Wilder, released in 1991.

The album's single, "Tough It Out", peaked at No. 16 on the Billboard Mainstream Rock chart. The album was promoted in part through a short film, "Horror Hayride", which was later included as part of Wilder's Corn Flicks video.

== Production ==
The album was produced by R. S. Field. It included guest appearances by Al Kooper and Sonny Landreth. The cover photo was taken by James Flournoy Holmes.

== Critical reception ==
Professional ratings
Review scores
| Source | Rating |
|---|---|
| AllMusic | 4.5/5 stars |
| Chicago Tribune | 2/4 stars |
| Houston Chronicle | 4/4 stars |
| MusicHound Rock: The Essential Album Guide | 3/5 stars |
| The Rolling Stone Album Guide | 3/5 stars |
| The State | 4/4 stars |

Trouser Press wrote that "Webb swaggers gloriously... The diverse menu includes the rousing boogie of 'Tough It Out', a heart-rending plea for forgiveness in the form of 'Everyday (I Kick Myself)', a spiffy display by [guitarist Donny 'The Twangler' Roberts] on the instrumental 'Sputnik' and, against all odds, an exciting version of the warhorse 'Baby Please Don’t Go'." The Washington Post thought that the album's two covers were better than any of the Wilder originals, but conceded that "the quartet plays with more focused power than ever before."

The Morning Call deemed the album "a heady mojo, full of Southern-fried rockin', stomping R&B; and Memphis twang." Stereo Review called it "Hillbilly Gothic at its deadpan best." The Chicago Tribune declared that "at its worst, this album sounds like Jethro Tull does roots rock."

AllMusic wrote that Wilder and his band "start from a basic blues style fused to rootsy rock, then shish-kebab the result with a skewered view of mundane existence." The Rolling Stone Album Guide praised the "rocking, witty and often moving sagas."

== Track listing ==
| No. | Title | Length |
|---|---|---|
| 1. | "Hoodoo Witch" | 6:32 |
| 2. | "Tough It Out" | 3:54 |
| 3. | "Meet Your New Landlord" | 3:58 |
| 4. | "Sittin' Pretty" | 4:10 |
| 5. | "Big Time" | 4:18 |
| 6. | "Sputnik" | 3:17 |
| 7. | "Run with It" | 4:48 |
| 8. | "King of the Hill" | 4:58 |
| 9. | "Everyday (I Kick Myself)" | 4:00 |
| 10. | "The Rest (Will Take Care of Itself)" | 4:24 |
| 11. | "Baby Please Don't Go" | 4:47 |
| 12. | "I Had Too Much to Dream (Last Night)" | 4:03 |
