= Stay (Simply Red album) =

Studio album by Simply Red
- Released: 12 March 2007 (UK)
- Recorded: 2006–2007
- Studio: Mick Hucknall's home studio; Metropolis Studios (London, UK)
- Genre: Soul
- Length: 43:39
- Label: Simplyred.com
- Producer: Mick Hucknall; Andy Wright; Mark Jaimes; Danny Saxon; Morten Schjolin

Simply Red chronology
Simplified (2005)	Stay (2007)	Simply Red 25: The Greatest Hits (2008)

Singles from Stay
- 1. "Oh! What a Girl!" Released: September 2006; 2. "So Not Over You" Released: March 2007; 3. "Stay" Released: May 2007; 4. "The World and You Tonight" Released: October 2007

Professional ratings
Review scores
Source	Rating
AllMusic	link
The Guardian	link
Uncut	2/5 stars

Stay is the tenth studio album by British pop group Simply Red. It was released on 12 March 2007 in the UK and entered the official charts at No. 4. Stay features 10 original tracks and a cover version of "Debris" by The Faces.

== Track listing ==
- Credits adapted from Simply Red's official website.

Standard version
No.	Title	Writer(s)	Producer(s)	Length
1.	"The World and You Tonight"	Mick Hucknall; Andy Wright	Wright; Hucknall	3:33
2.	"So Not Over You"	Hucknall; Pete Woodroffe; Charlie Grant; Sarah Anne Osuji; Alana Hood; Hannah Thomson	Wright; Hucknall; Mark Jaimes^{[a]}; Danny Saxon^{[a]}	3:50
3.	"Stay"	Hucknall; Dave Clayton; Wright; Morten Schjolin	Wright; Hucknall; Schjolin^{[b]}	3:04
4.	"They Don't Know"	Hucknall; Clayton	Wright; Jaimes^{[a]}; Saxon^{[a]}	3:40
5.	"Oh! What a Girl!"	Hucknall; Wright; Gary Go	Wright; Jaimes^{[a]}; Saxon^{[a]}	3:51
6.	"Good Times Have Done Me Wrong"	Hucknall; Wright	Wright; Hucknall	5:20
7.	"Debris"	Ronnie Lane	Hucknall	4:52
8.	"Lady"	Hucknall; Jools Holland	Hucknall	5:00
9.	"Money TV"	Hucknall; Ian Kirkham	Hucknall	4:05
10.	"The Death of the Cool"	Hucknall; Kirkham	Hucknall	3:26
11.	"Little Englander"	Hucknall; Kirkham	Hucknall	3:06

=== 2014 Remastered & expanded version bonus tracks ===
Disc 1: Radio edits
No.	Title	Length
12.	"Oh! What a Girl" (radio version)	3:48
13.	"Stay" (radio mix)	3:07
14.	"So Not Over You" (single version)	3:31
15.	"Go Now" (single version)	3:27
16.	"Stay" (7th Heaven radio edit)	4:10
17.	"So Not Over You" (Johnny Douglas radio mix)	3:46

Disc 2: Remixes
No.	Title	Length
1.	"Go Now" (trance vocal)	3:47
2.	"Oh! What A Girl!" (Sweet Connection club mix)	6:44
3.	"Stay" (7th Heaven vocal mix)	7:41
4.	"Go Now" (Triple Dee club remix)	7:09
5.	"Oh! What A Girl" (Tom Belton vocal mix)	7:54
6.	"So Not Over You" (Motivo Pop-Lectro remix)	4:59
7.	"Stay" (Grant Nelson club mix)	5:51
8.	"Go Now" (Alex B very vocal)	7:00

Disc 2: Bonus tracks
No.	Title	Length
9.	"Beside You"	3:40
10.	"Oh! What a Girl!" (live)	4:36
11.	"Debris" (Sirius radio session)	4:06
12.	"Stay" (Sirius radio session)	3:25
13.	"So Not Over You" (Sirius radio session)	3:37

DVD

Feature interview

1. "Mark Goodier Interviews Mick Hucknall About Stay – March 2014"

Promo videos

2. "Oh! What a Girl!"
3. "So Not Over You"
4. "Stay" (live)
5. "So Not Over You" (live)

Bonus feature

6. "Stay Album EPK"

BBC TV appearances

7. "Oh! What a Girl!" (Later... with Jools Holland, Broadcast on 18 May 2007)
8. "They Don't Know" (Later... with Jools Holland, Broadcast on 18 May 2007)

Notes

- ^{^[a]} signifies a co-producer
- ^{^[b]} signifies an additional producer

== Singles ==
- "Oh! What a Girl!" (September 2006)
- "So Not Over You" (5 March 2007)
- "Stay" (28 May 2007) ("Stay" received popular Club Mixes from 7th Heaven.)
- "The World and You Tonight" (October 2007)

== Personnel ==
=== Musicians ===
By this point in the band's career, "Simply Red" was essentially a trade name for Mick Hucknall, who appeared to be the only permanent member of the group. The Stay album credits simply list the musicians who played on the album in alphabetical order, with no listing of what instruments they may have played, or which tracks they may have played on. Oddly, Hucknall himself does not appear on the album's list of musicians.

Credited musicians are:

- Dave Bloor – percussion programming (1, 5)
- Sarah Brown
- Anthea Clarke
- Dave Clayton
- Gavin Goldberg
- Simon Hale
- Geoff Holyrode
- Mark Jaimes
- Dee Johnson
- Jilly Johnson
- John Johnson
- Ian Kirkham
- Pete Lewinson
- Steve Lewinson
- Chris De Margary
- Jim McWiliam
- Willie Fister
- Patrick Murdock
- Kevin Robinson
- Danny Saxon
- Morton Schjolin
- Kenji Suzuki
- Andy Wright
- The London Session Orchestra, led by Gavyn Wright

=== Production ===
- Andy Scade – recording
- Alan Douglas – recording (1, 3, 6)
- Gavin Goldberg – recording (1, 2, 4, 5)
- Dave Bloor – recording (2, 4, 5)
- Michael Zimmerling – recording (2, 4, 5, 7–11)
- Johnny Wow – mixing
- Pete Craigie – additional mix engineer (1, 3)
- Kevin Metcalfe – mastering at The Soundmasters (London, UK)
- Peacock Design – art direction, design
- Hamish Brown – photography

== Charts ==
=== Weekly charts ===
Weekly chart performance for Stay
Chart (2007)	Peak position
Austrian Albums (Ö3 Austria)	6
Belgian Albums (Ultratop Flanders)	9
Belgian Albums (Ultratop Wallonia)	27
Danish Albums (Hitlisten)	34
Dutch Albums (Album Top 100)	3
French Albums (SNEP)	58
German Albums (Offizielle Top 100)	4
Italian Albums (FIMI)	5
Portuguese Albums (AFP)	18
Swiss Albums (Schweizer Hitparade)	6
UK Albums (OCC)	4
US Billboard 200	156

=== Year-end charts ===
2007 year-end chart performance for Stay
Chart (2007)	Position
Dutch Albums (Album Top 100)	25
German Albums (Offizielle Top 100)	92
Swiss Albums (Schweizer Hitparade)	92
UK Albums (OCC)	94

== Certifications ==
Certifications and sales for Stay
Region	Certification	Certified units/sales
Italy (FIMI)	Gold	40,000^{*}
Netherlands (NVPI)	Gold	35,000^{^}
Poland (ZPAV)	Gold	10,000^{*}
United Kingdom (BPI)	Gold	100,000^{^}
^{*} Sales figures based on certification alone.^{^} Shipments figures based on certification alone.
