= Simply Red =

English pop and soul band

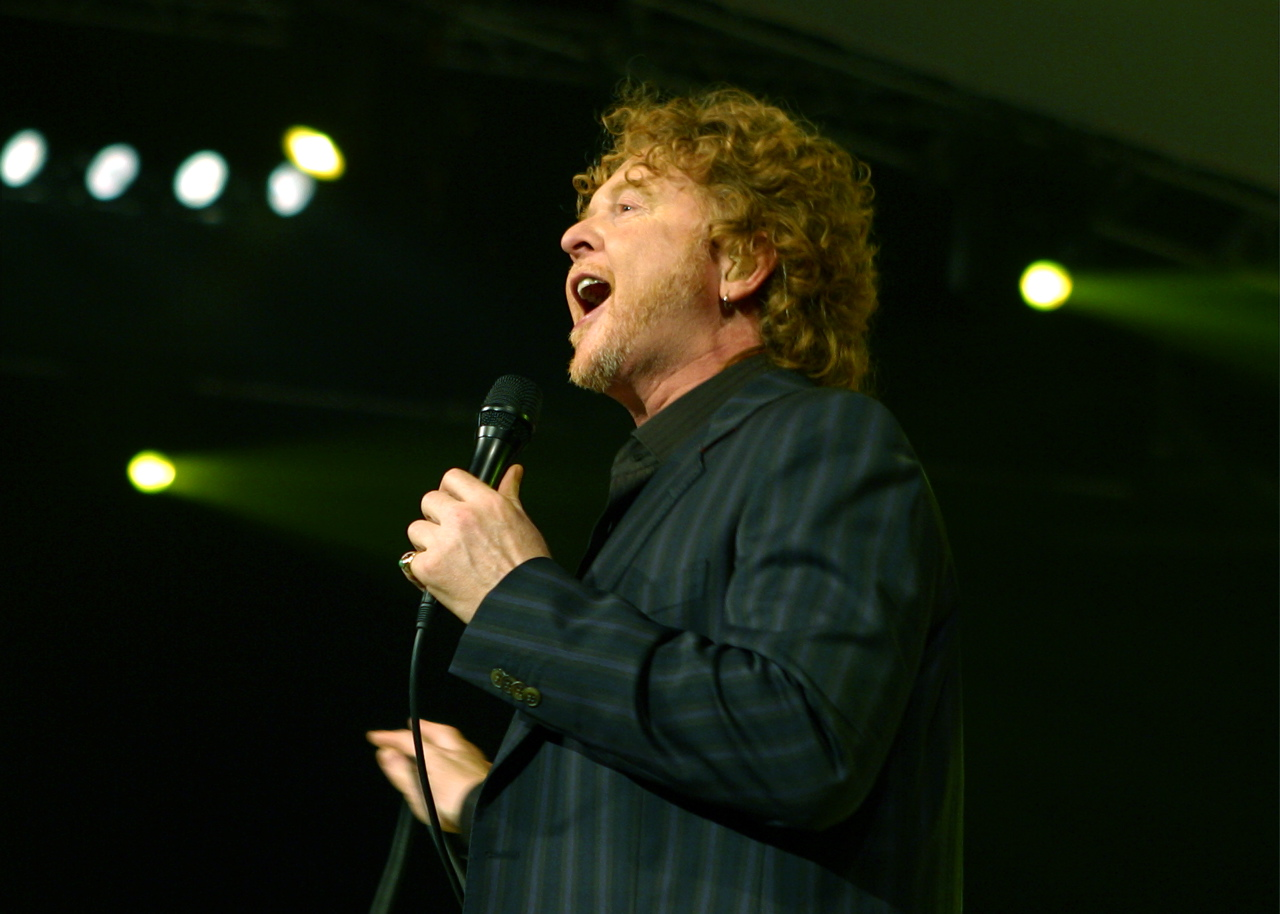
- Lead singer Mick Hucknall

Background information
- Origin: Manchester, England
- Genres: Pop; soul; blue-eyed soul; soft rock; sophisti-pop
- Years active: 1985–2010; 2015–present
- Labels: Elektra; East West; Simplyred.com
- Members: Mick Hucknall; Ian Kirkham; Kenji Suzuki; Kevin Robinson; Roman Roth; Gary Sanctuary; Orefo Orakwue
- Past members: see Membership section
- Website: simplyred.com

Simply Red are an English pop and soul band formed in Manchester in 1985. The band is led by singer and songwriter Mick Hucknall, who is the only original member remaining in the band. They have released thirteen studio albums, from Picture Book (1985) through Time (2023), all of which have peaked within the top ten on the UK Albums Chart; with the albums A New Flame (1989), Stars (1991), Life (1995) and Blue (1998), along with their Greatest Hits (1996) album, reaching number one. Stars is one of the best-selling albums in the United Kingdom.

The group have released ten songs that have reached the top 10 on the UK singles chart, including "Stars", the Fugees-assisted "Angel", "The Air That I Breathe" and "Sunrise", with the single "Fairground" peaking atop the UK chart. Their singles "Holding Back the Years" and "If You Don't Know Me by Now" both reached number one on the US Billboard Hot 100, while "Something Got Me Started", the mentioned "Fairground" and "Say You Love Me" topped the European Hit Radio Chart.

At the 1992 and 1993 Brit Awards, they received the award for Best British Group. They have received three Grammy Award nominations, including one for Best New Artist in 1987. Their version of "If You Don't Know Me by Now" won songwriters Kenny Gamble and Leon Huff the Grammy Award for the Best R&B Song. The band broke up in 2010 but re-formed in 2015. Simply Red have sold over 50 million albums.

== History ==
=== 1977–1984: The Frantic Elevators ===
Hucknall was in a punk group called the Frantic Elevators, whose seven-year run produced limited releases on local labels and ended in 1984 upon critical acclaim for their final single, "Holding Back the Years".

=== 1985–1988: Formation and early success ===
After the demise of the Frantic Elevators, Hucknall linked up with manager Elliot Rashman. By early 1985, Hucknall and Rashman had assembled a band of local session musicians and begun to attract record-company attention. The group went under a number of names: World Service, Red and the Dancing Dead, and Red (after Hucknall's nickname, denoting his hair colour) but Hucknall decided the latter name would sound better with the addition of the word 'Simply'. The band's name is also linked to Hucknall's allegiance to being a supporter of Manchester United, as the club's home shirt colour is red.

The initial Simply Red line-up consisted of Mick Hucknall (vocals), David Fryman (guitar), Tony Bowers (bass), Fritz McIntyre (keyboards and vocals), Tim Kellett (brass and live backing vocals) and Chris Joyce (drums). Bowers and Joyce had both previously been members of post-punk bands the Durutti Column and the Mothmen; Kellett had also been a member of the Durutti Column, though not at the same time as Bowers and Joyce.

Simply Red signed a contract with Elektra in 1985, but after recording one track ("Red Box"), Fryman left the group and was replaced by guitarist Sylvan Richardson, billed as 'Sylvan'.

"Red Box" was released in 1985 as a B-side to the group's first single, "Money's Too Tight (to Mention)", a cover of a soul song originally recorded by the Valentine Brothers. "Money's Too Tight (to Mention)" gained international success, reaching the UK and Irish top 20, then later the American, French and Dutch top 30, and the Italian top 5. It was included on their debut album, Picture Book, also released in 1985.

Several low-charting singles followed. Among the comparative flops was a re-recording of the Frantic Elevators' "Holding Back the Years", done up in a new soul-ballad style arrangement. Released as Simply Red's third single in 1985, the track initially placed outside the UK top 50. However, upon being re-released in 1986, "Holding Back the Years" became a major hit, peaking at number one in Ireland, number 2 in the UK, number 3 in the Netherlands, number 20 in Italy and later number one in the United States.

Simply Red's second album, 1987's Men and Women, saw the band adopting bowler hats and colourful suits instead of their earlier ragamuffin look. As well, the introspection and social commentary of their debut album was replaced by a blue-eyed soul sound with funk influences. Veteran Motown songwriter Lamont Dozier co-authored two tracks with Hucknall for the album—these tracks were credited to 'Hucknall/Dozier/Hucknall' in the original album credits, in homage to the famous Motown writing team of Holland–Dozier–Holland.

The album's lead single "The Right Thing" was another international hit, charting in the top 40 throughout Europe and North America. Several follow-up singles also met with modest success in the UK and elsewhere.

=== 1989–1995: Peak years ===
Guitarist Richardson left after the release of Men and Women and was replaced by Brazilian Heitor Pereira (billed as Heitor TP). Saxophonist Ian Kirkham, who joined the group during the Picture Book tour in 1986 and played on Men and Women, became an official member.

With their third album A New Flame in 1989, Simply Red transitioned to a more mainstream pop sound. This shift was highlighted by their cover of Harold Melvin & the Blue Notes' Philadelphia soul classic "If You Don't Know Me by Now". The track became the band's second U.S. number 1 hit, and one of the highest-selling singles of the year internationally, marking their most significant commercial success up to that point.

Hucknall was by this time an international superstar, being photographed with models and Hollywood celebrities. This seemed to harm the band's coherence as a unit, with Hucknall declaring in 1991 that Simply Red was "essentially a solo project". The rhythm section of Bowers and Joyce left around this time; they were replaced by bassist Shaun Ward (ex-Floy Joy and Everyday People) and drummer Gota Yashiki (often billed as just Gota).

The band's career peaked in late 1991 with the release of Stars, which became the best-selling album for two years running in Europe and the UK (though notably had less chart success in the US than their previous albums, still earning however a gold certification). The album spun off five top 40 singles in the UK, and the singles "Something Got Me Started" and "Stars" were also significant chart hits throughout all of Europe, North America, Australia and New Zealand. After the tour, Tim Kellett left to form dance band Olive.

After touring and promoting Stars for two years, Simply Red returned in 1995 with "Fairground", a dance-influenced track prominently featuring a sample from Zki & Dobri's Goodmen project. A massive radio hit, "Fairground" went on to become the band's first and only UK number 1. Its parent album Life sold more than a million copies in the UK alone, making it the fourth-biggest seller of the year. By this time, the band was officially Hucknall, McIntyre, Pereira, Kirkham, and new backing vocalist Dee Johnson. Guest musicians (including Sly & Robbie) filled in on drums and bass. For the subsequent live shows, Simply Red were joined by new recruits' Steve Lewinson on bass, Velroy Bailey on drums, and second backing vocalist Sarah Brown.

=== 1996–2000 ===
McIntyre, the only original remaining band member aside from lead singer Hucknall, left the group after the Life album, as did Pereira. From that time in 1996, Simply Red was essentially a trade name for Hucknall and a bevy of session musicians, which would vary from track to track (and gig to gig) as needed, although all post-1996 Simply Red albums and live shows did include contributions from sax player Ian Kirkham. Returning drummer Gota Yashiki (co-producing several album tracks) and backing vocalists Dee Johnson and Sarah Brown were also frequently involved with the band's later recordings and shows, as was new keyboardist/co-producer Andy Wright.

East West Records issued the compilation album Greatest Hits in 1996. The album featured one new track, a cover of the 1973 Aretha Franklin hit "Angel", which was co-produced with the Fugees (who also served as backing musicians). Released as a single, "Angel" reached number 4 in the UK.

In 1998, the cover-heavy Blue was released, which had four UK top 40 singles, including the top 10 hits "Say You Love Me" and a cover of "The Air That I Breathe". The follow-up album, 1999's Love and the Russian Winter, was a relative disappointment, spawning two minor hits that failed to break the top 10.

Simply Red were dropped from their label, East West Records in April 2000. Hucknall subsequently set up the website Simplyred.com to handle releases of new recordings; the new label/website venture proved to be quite successful, many of the band's Simplyred.com releases selling and charting almost as well as their earlier recordings.

=== 2003–2010: Re-establishment as a band and disbanding ===
Between 2003 and its disbandment in 2010, the band's core members were Mick Hucknall (lead vocals), Ian Kirkham (saxophone/EWI/keyboards), Dave Clayton (keyboards), Kenji Suzuki (guitar), Kevin Robinson (trumpet/flugelhorn/percussion), Steve Lewinson (bass guitar) and Pete Lewinson (drums). These musicians featured on Simply Red's shows as well as on albums, though in the studio, they were often augmented or replaced by session musicians. From 2003 to 2008, Dee Johnson (backing vocals), Sarah Brown (backing vocals), John Johnson (trombone/percussion) and Chris De Margary (saxophone/flute) also continued to be in the band and have appeared on albums and tours.

On 24 March 2003, the band released Home, a mixture of original songs and covers, including a version of the Stylistics' "You Make Me Feel Brand New", which hit UK number 7. The album went Double Platinum in the United Kingdom, Gold in Canada, and Platinum in Europe. It featured two other hit singles: "Sunrise" (number 7 UK) and "Fake" (number 21 UK).

On 13 October 2005, followed Simplified, mainly an album of stripped-down versions of their classic hits. The single "Perfect Love" made it to number 30 on the UK chart, the band's final top 30 placing.

On 12 March 2007, the band released its tenth (and, at that time, proclaimed final) studio album, Stay. This was preceded by the single from that album, "So Not Over You", released on 5 March 2007, which would peak at number 34 in the UK. Follow-up single "Stay" (released on 28 May 2007) peaked at number 36 UK, and was the band's final placing in the UK top 100 (although they would release several non-charting singles in the following years).

On 19 May 2008, Hucknall released his first solo album, Tribute to Bobby. The backing musicians on the solo album were virtually the same group of musicians he had been working with as "Simply Red" for the last few years.

Hucknall announced that the name Simply Red would be retired after a farewell tour, which started in early 2009 and ended in 2010, saying, "I've kind of decided that the 25 years is going to be enough, so I intend that 2009 will be the last Simply Red tour."

The band's concert at the O_{2} Arena in London on 19 December 2010 was their last concert until a reunion in 2015. The concert was shown live at cinemas throughout the UK.

=== 2014–2015: Reunion, Big Love and 30th anniversary reunion tour ===
On 3 November 2014, Simply Red announced that they would be reforming in Autumn 2015 for a 30th anniversary European tour, the Big Love Tour. The tour started on 20 October 2015 in Odense, Denmark, and ended on 26 August 2016 at the Summerdays Festival in Arbon, Switzerland, performing the following month an ultimate show on 10 September 2016 at the BMW Festival Night in Munich, Germany. The line-up for the reunion tour was the same as Simply Red's last formation with the exception of Roman Roth replacing Pete Lewinson as the drummer. The tour included a concert at Menora Mivtachim Arena in Tel Aviv, Israel, the band's first Israeli appearance since performances in Jerusalem and Tel Aviv in 1992.

On 19 April 2015, the band announced that they would be releasing a new studio album, named Big Love, containing 12 new tracks. The new album was released on 29 May 2015.

=== 2016–2018: 25 Years of Stars Tour and Symphonica In Rosso ===
On 11 November 2016, Simply Red embarked in Dublin, Ireland on the 25 Years of Stars Live Tour, celebrating the 25th anniversary of the release in September 1991 of Stars by playing live on stage the entire album in its original running order, while the second half of the show featured hits and classic Simply Red songs. The debut date in Ireland was followed by a 10-date UK leg starting on 13 November in Liverpool, England, and ending on 27 November at the O_{2} Arena in London.

In 2017, the band headlined the Symphonica In Rosso event on 25, 26 and 28 October. A live album of the concert, Symphonica in Rosso – Live at Ziggo Dome, Amsterdam, was released on 23 November 2018. It peaked at number 58 on the UK Albums Chart.

=== 2019–2023: Blue Eyed Soul ===
The band's twelfth studio album, Blue Eyed Soul, was released on 8 November 2019. It debuted at number six on the UK Albums Chart, selling nearly 10,000 copies in its first week.

Simply Red's concert dates for 2021 were postponed to 2022 and 2023 due to the COVID-19 pandemic.

On 22 October 2022, Simply Red released their first remix album, Simply Red Remixed Vol. 1 (1985–2000).

=== 2023: Time ===
On 2 March 2023, Simply Red announced the release of their thirteenth studio album, Time, for 26 May 2023. The first unveiled track from the album is "Earth in a Lonely Space", which was already released as a single on 18 May 2021. The lead single, "Better with You", was released on 2 March 2023, accompanying the album's official announcement. Although the band's long-time keyboardist Dave Clayton has recorded some parts for Time and has even played "Better with You" with Simply Red during the final shows of 2022, Clayton's decision to leave the group after almost 20 years (with hopes of being able to spend more time with his family) was announced by the time that the year of 2022 was over. In the months leading up to the release of the Time album, Simply Red have released two further singles – "Shades 22" and "Just Like You" – on 31 March 2023 and 27 April 2023 respectively. The band announced an intimate album launch show for 5 June 2023 at the O2 Shepherd's Bush Empire in London; this was their only UK performance in 2023. Also at the Shepherd's Bush show, Hucknall officially introduced new keyboard player Gary Sanctuary to the fans.

=== 2025: 40th Anniversary Tour and concert film ===
In 2025, the band embarked on a 40th Anniversary World Tour, including many performances in the UK. Hucknall made a surprise appearance at Glastonbury Festival 2025.

Holding Back the Years: 40 Years of Simply Red, a film capturing their five dates at the Movistar Arena in Santiago, Chile, premiered in cinemas worldwide on 15 May 2025.

== Awards and nominations ==
ARPA Music Awards

Year	Nominee / work	Award	Result
1996	"Fairground"	Most Performed Foreign Work	Nominated

ASCAP Pop Music Awards

Year	Nominee / work	Award	Result	Ref.
1987	"Holding Back the Years"	Most Performed Song	Won	
1988	"Holding Back the Years"	Most Performed Song	Won	

Brit Awards

Year	Nominee / work	Award	Result
1985	Picture Book	Best British Album	Nominated
1987	"Holding Back the Years"	Best British Single	Nominated
1987	Simply Red	Best British Group	Nominated
1990	Simply Red	Best British Group	Nominated
1990	"If You Don't Know Me by Now"	Best British Single	Nominated
1990	A New Flame	Best British Album	Nominated
1992	Stars	Best British Album	Nominated
1992	"Stars"	Best British Video	Nominated
1992	Simply Red	Best British Group	Won
1993	Simply Red	Best British Group	Won
1993	Mick Hucknall	Best British Male	Won
1993	"For Your Babies"	Best British Video	Nominated
1997	Mick Hucknall	Best British Male	Nominated

ECHO Awards

Year	Nominee / work	Award	Result
1999	Simply Red	Best International Group	Nominated
2004	Simply Red	Best International Group	Nominated

Goldene Europa

Year	Nominee / work	Award	Result
2000	Simply Red	Group of the Year	Won

Grammy Awards

Year	Nominee / work	Award	Result
1987	Simply Red	Best New Artist	Nominated
1987	"Holding Back the Years"	Best Pop Performance by a Duo or Group with Vocals	Nominated
1990	"If You Don't Know Me by Now"	Best Pop Performance by a Duo or Group with Vocals	Nominated

Hungarian Music Awards

Year	Nominee / work	Award	Result
1996	Life	Best Foreign Album	Nominated

Ivor Novello Awards

Year	Nominee / work	Award	Result
1992	Mick Hucknall	Songwriter of the Year	Won
1992	"Stars"	Best Song Musically & Lyrically	Nominated
1996	"Fairground"	Best Selling Song	Nominated
2002	Simply Red	Outstanding Song Collection	Won

Lunas del Auditorio

Year	Nominee / work	Award	Result
2004	Themselves	Best Foreign Pop Artist	Nominated
2009	Themselves	Best Foreign Pop Artist	Nominated
2010	Themselves	Best Foreign Pop Artist	Nominated

MTV Video Music Awards

Year	Nominee / work	Award	Result
1986	"Holding Back the Years"	Best New Artist	Nominated

Mercury Prize

Year	Nominee / work	Award	Result
1992	Stars	Album of the Year	Nominated

Music & Media Year-End Awards

Year	Nominee / work	Award	Result	Ref.
1989	Simply Red	Group of the Year	Won	

Pollstar Concert Industry Awards

Year	Nominee / work	Award	Result
1987	Tour	Small Hall Tour of the Year	Nominated
1987	Simply Red	Next Major Arena Headliner	Nominated
1988	Simply Red	Next Major Arena Headliner	Nominated
1988	Tour	Small Hall Tour of the Year	Nominated

== Members ==
=== Current members ===
Image	Name	Years active	Instruments	Release contributions
	Mick Hucknall	1985–2010; 2015–present	lead vocals; occasional acoustic guitar	all releases
	Ian Kirkham	1986–2010; 2015–present	saxophone; EWI; keyboards	all releases except Picture Book (1985)
	Kenji Suzuki	1998–2010; 2015–present	guitars; backing vocals	all releases from Love and the Russian Winter (1999) onwards
	Kevin Robinson	1999–2010; 2015–present	trumpet; flugelhorn; percussion; backing vocals	all releases from Love and the Russian Winter (1999) onwards
	Roman Roth	2015–present	drums; backing vocals	all releases from Big Love (2015) onwards
	Gary Sanctuary	2023–present	keyboards	Time (2023)
	Orefo Orakwue	2024–present	bass; backing vocals	none to date

=== Former members ===
Image	Name	Years active	Instruments	Release contributions
	Fritz McIntyre	1985–1996 (died 2021)	keyboards; backing and occasional co-lead vocals	all releases from Picture Book (1985) to Life (1995)
	Tim Kellett	1985–1993	trumpet; flugelhorn; keyboards; backing vocals	all releases from Picture Book (1985) to The Montreux EP (1992)
	Tony Bowers	1985–1991	bass	Picture Book (1985); Men and Women (1987); A New Flame (1989)
	Chris Joyce	1985–1991	drums; percussion	Picture Book (1985); Men and Women (1987); A New Flame (1989)
	David Fryman	1985 (died 2022)	guitars	none
	Sylvan Richardson	1985–1987	guitars	Picture Book (1985); Men and Women (1987)
	Aziz Ibrahim	1987–1988	guitars	none
	Heitor Pereira	1988–1996	guitars	all releases from A New Flame (1989) to Life (1995)
	Gota Yashiki	1991–1995; 1998–2003	drums; percussion; bass	all releases from Stars (1991) to Simplified (2005)
	Shaun Ward	1991–1994	bass; backing vocals	Stars (1991); The Montreux EP (1992)
	Dee Johnson	1991–2008	backing vocals	all releases from Life (1995) to Stay (2007)
	Steve Lewinson	1995–1998; 2003–2010; 2015–2024 (until his death)	bass; backing vocals	Blue (1998); all releases from Home (2003) to Time (2023)
	Velroy Bailey	1995–1998	drums	Life (1995); Blue (1998)
	Sarah Brown	1995–2008	backing vocals	all releases from Life (1995) to Stay (2007)
	Tim Vine	1998–2002	keyboards	Blue (1998); Love and the Russian Winter (1999)
	John Johnson	1998–2008 (died 2017)	trombone; percussion	all releases from Blue (1998) to Stay (2007)
	Chris De Margary	1998–2008	saxophone; flute	all releases from Love and the Russian Winter (1999) to Blue Eyed Soul (2019)
	Colin Graham	1998	trumpet	none
	Mark Jaimes	1998–2003 (session afterwards)	guitars	Blue (1998); Love and the Russian Winter (1999); Home (2003); Stay (2007); Big Love (2015); Blue Eyed Soul (2019); Time (2023)
	Wayne Stobbart	1998–2002	bass	
	Andy Wright	1998–2002 (session and production afterwards)	keyboards; bass	Life (1995); Blue (1998); Love and the Russian Winter (1999); Home (2003); Simplified (2005); Stay (2007); Big Love (2015); Blue Eyed Soul (2019); Time (2023)
	Dave Clayton	2003–2010; 2015–2023	keyboards; backing vocals	all releases from Home (2003) to Time (2023)
	Pete Lewinson	2003–2015	drums	all releases from Home (2003) to Big Love (2015)

== Discography ==
Studio albums

- Picture Book (1985)
- Men and Women (1987)
- A New Flame (1989)
- Stars (1991)
- Life (1995)
- Blue (1998)
- Love and the Russian Winter (1999)
- Home (2003)
- Simplified (2005)
- Stay (2007)
- Big Love (2015)
- Blue Eyed Soul (2019)
- Time (2023)

== See also ==
- List of artists who reached number one in the United States
- List of artists who reached number one on the U.S. dance chart
- List of Billboard number-one singles
- List of Billboard number-one dance hits
