= Recollects (disambiguation) =

Recollects may refer to:

== Catholic organisations ==
- Recollects, a Franciscan Recollection group established in France as a result of the reforms that were implemented in various mendicant orders during the 16th and 17th centuries, as part of the Roman Catholic Counter-Reformation.
- Order of Augustinian Recollects, the first Augustinian Recollection that originated in Spain as a result of the Chapter of Toledo in 1589.
- Discalced Augustinians, another Augustinian Recollection that originated in Italy in 1610.

== Geography ==
- Paseo de Recoletos, Spain
- Rue des Récollets, Quebec City
- Parroquia La Recoleta, Cochabamba, Bolivia
- Convento La Recoleta, Sucre, Bolivia
- La Recoleta Cemetery, Buenos Aires, Argentina
- Recoleta, Buenos Aires, Argentina
- Colegio Sagrados Corazones Recoleta, Lima, Peru
