= The Right Thing (song) =

Single by Simply Red

from the album Men and Women
- B-side: "There's A Light"
- Released: February 2, 1987
- Recorded: 1986
- Genre: Blue-eyed soul; funk
- Length: 4:18
- Label: Elektra
- Songwriter: Mick Hucknall
- Producer: Alex Sadkin

Simply Red singles chronology
| "Open Up the Red Box" (1986) | "The Right Thing" (1987) | "Infidelity" (1987) |

Music video
- "The Right Thing” on YouTube

"The Right Thing" is a song by the British soul and pop band Simply Red, released as the first single from their second album, Men and Women (1987). The song reached #11 on the UK charts in early 1987 and #27 on the US Billboard Hot 100.

== Critical reception ==
Wayne Hussey of Smash Hits panned "The Right Thing", stating he "detest[ed] this kind of white soul" and criticising Hucknall's "red hair".

== Music video ==
The official music video for the song was directed by Andy Morahan.

== Charts ==
=== Weekly charts ===
Weekly chart performance for "The Right Thing"
| Chart (1987) | Peak position |
|---|---|
| Belgium (Ultratop 50 Flanders) | 4 |
| Finland (Suomen virallinen lista) | 17 |
| Italy Airplay (Music & Media) | 13 |
| Netherlands (Dutch Top 40) | 4 |
| Netherlands (Single Top 100) | 5 |
| New Zealand (Recorded Music NZ) | 9 |
| Switzerland (Schweizer Hitparade) | 10 |
| UK Singles (Official Charts) | 11 |
| US Billboard Hot 100 | 27 |
| West Germany (GfK) | 27 |

=== Year-end charts ===
1987 year-end chart performance for "The Right Thing"
| Chart (1987) | Position |
|---|---|
| Belgium (Ultratop Flanders) | 43 |
| European Top 100 Singles (Music & Media) | 56 |
| Netherlands (Dutch Top 40) | 50 |
| Netherlands (Single Top 100) | 53 |
