= Fake (Simply Red song) =

2003 single by Simply Red

Single by Simply Red

from the album Home
- Released: 7 July 2003
- Length: 3:58
- Label: simplyred.com
- Songwriters: Sara Brown; Chris de Margary; Mick Hucknall; Mark Jaimes; John Johnson; Dee Johnson; Ian Kirkham; Steve Lewinson; Kenji Suzuki; Gota Yashiki
- Producers: Mick Hucknall; Stewart Levine

Simply Red singles chronology
"Sunrise" (2003)	"Fake" (2003)	"You Make Me Feel Brand New" (2003)

Music video
- "Fake" on YouTube

"Fake" is a song written and recorded by British soft rock group Simply Red. It was released in July 2003 as the second single from the album, Home. It was the next single after their international smash hit "Sunrise". It reached number-one on the US Billboard Dance Club Play chart on the week of 14 February 2004.

== Music video ==
The music video was filmed at a nightclub in Watford, England on 8 May 2003 and was directed by Andy Morahan. It features Mick Hucknall walking around in the nightclub and talking to people who look like famous artists and celebrities. Among them are doubles of Arnold Schwarzenegger, Eminem, Ozzy Osbourne, Naomi Campbell, Kylie Minogue, Diana Ross, Robert De Niro, Madonna, Britney Spears, Pamela Anderson, Cameron Diaz, Pierce Brosnan, Sean Connery, Halle Berry, Michael Jackson, Joan Collins, Cher, David Beckham and Victoria Beckham. Hucknall also meets his own double, played by Andrew Kennedy from Cheshire. It also features Hucknall in a library when the line "I read a book and it's your face" is said.

== Track listings ==
CD single
No.	Title	Length
1.	"Fake" (radio mix)	3:43
2.	"Fake" (album edit)	3:15
3.	"Fake" (Love to Infinity Classic radio mix)	4:37
4.	"Fake" (Love to Infinity club mix)	7:00
5.	"Fake" (Phunk Investigation radio edit)	3:02
6.	"Fake" (Phunk Investigation Exte-Club mix)	7:03
7.	"Fake" (Phunk Investigation in Elettrica dub mix)	7:07

== Charts ==
=== Weekly charts ===
Weekly chart performance for "Fake"
Chart (2003–2004)	Peak position
Australia (ARIA)	97
Belgium (Ultratip Bubbling Under Flanders)	4
Belgium (Ultratip Bubbling Under Wallonia)	12
Croatia (HRT)	10
Germany (GfK)	43
Hungary (Editors' Choice Top 40)	19
Italy (FIMI)	7
Netherlands (Dutch Top 40)	6
Netherlands (Single Top 100)	19
Scottish Singles Sales (Official Charts)	19
Switzerland (Schweizer Hitparade)	41
UK Singles (Official Charts)	21
US Dance Club Play (Billboard)	1

=== Year-end charts ===
Year-end chart performance for "Fake"
Chart (2003)	Position
Netherlands (Dutch Top 40)	77

Chart (2004)	Position
US Dance Club Play (Billboard)	27

== Release history ==
Region	Date	Format(s)	Label(s)	Ref.
United Kingdom	7 July 2003	CD; cassette	simplyred.com	
Australia	18 August 2003	CD	simplyred.com	

== See also ==
- List of number-one dance singles of 2004 (U.S.)
