= Webb Wilder =

American musical artist

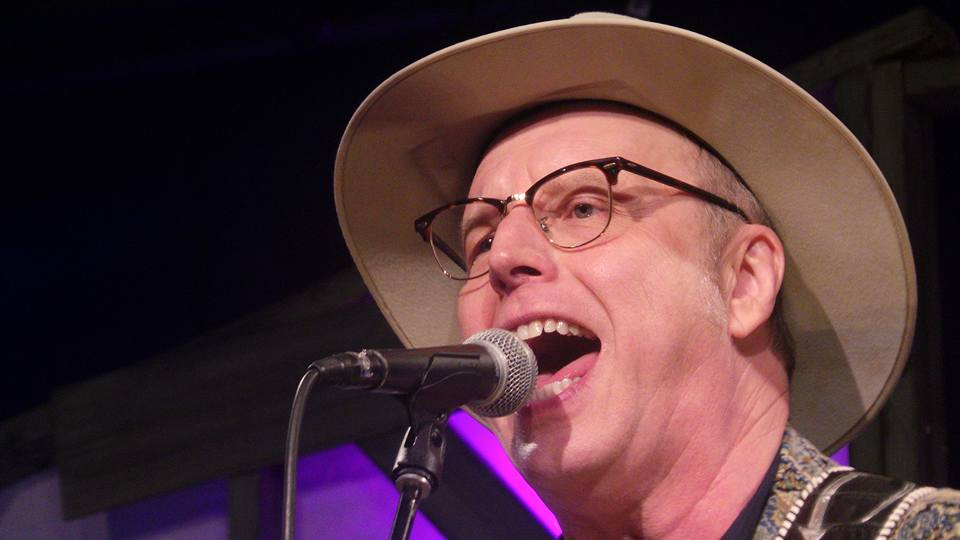
- Webb Wilder performs at Music City Roots in Franklin, Tennessee in 2015.

Background information
- Born: John Webb McMurray; May 19, 1954 (age 71); Hattiesburg, Mississippi, U.S.
- Genres: Progressive country, outlaw country, roots rock, rock and roll, rockabilly, southern rock, surf rock, Americana
- Occupations: Musician, actor
- Instruments: Vocals, guitar
- Years active: 1986–present
- Labels: Racket Records, Landslide Records, Island Records, Zoo/Praxis/BMG, Watermelon Records, Deaf Pig Records, Varèse Sarabande, DixieFrog Records
- Formerly of: The Drapes; The Beatnecks; The Nashvegans; The Ionizer
- Website: WebbWilder.com

John Webb McMurry (born May 19, 1954), known as Webb Wilder, is an American country, rock & roll singer, guitarist and actor.

== Early life ==
McMurry was born in Hattiesburg, Mississippi. He started playing guitar at the age of 12 and was playing in bands when he was 14.

His aunt was Lillian McMurry, the founder of Trumpet Records. She mentored him and gave advice as he started in the music industry.

== Career ==
With his groups like The Drapes, The Beatnecks, The Nashvegans, Wilder combines the straight-ahead rock & roll with surf guitar of the Ventures and twang of Duane Eddy, drawing on the feel of blues, R&B, country/rockabilly and film noir. His sound incorporated influence from Americana music as well as from the British Invasion.

Wilder said that his music was progressive country. He has been signed to major labels and worked with independent labels. He has also hosted a radio show for Sirius Radio.

Webb Wilder appeared as an actor in Peter Bogdanovich's 1993 feature film The Thing Called Love. As of 2020, he was an afternoon-shift disc jockey for radio station WMOT, which is based in Murfreesboro, Tennessee.

== Discography ==
=== Albums ===
| Date of Release | Title | Label | Producer |
|---|---|---|---|
| 1986 | It Came from Nashville | Landslide Records | R.S. Field |
| 1989 | Hybrid Vigor | Island Records | R.S. Field for Praxis International |
| 1991 | Doo Dad | Zoo Records/Praxis International/BMG | R.S. Field |
| 1993 | It Came from Nashville (CD release) | Watermelon Records | R.S. Field |
| 1995 | Town & Country | Watermelon Records | R.S. Field, George Bradfute, Webb & the Nashvegans |
| 1996 | Acres of Suede | Watermelon Records | R.S. Field and Scott Baggett |
| 2005 | About Time | Landslide Records | R.S. Field |
| 2005 | Scattered, Smothered and Covered: A Webb Wilder Overview [compilation] | Varèse Sarabande | Various |
| 2006 | Tough It Out! (Live in Concert) (also released as It's Live Time! and Born to Be Wilder) | Landslide Records/DixieFrog Records/Blind Pig Records | R.S. Field |
| 2009 | More Like Me | Blind Pig Records | Webb Wilder & Joe V. McMahan |
| 2015 | Mississippi Mōderne | Landslide Records | Webb Wilder, Bob Williams, Tom Comet, George Bradfute, and Joe V. McMahan |
| 2018 | Powerful Stuff! | Landslide Records | Various |
| 2020 | Night Without Love | Landslide Records | Webb Wilder |
| 2025 | Hillbilly Speedball | Landslide Records | Webb Wilder, George Bradfute |

=== Charted singles ===
List of charted singles, with selected chart positions
| Title | Year | Peak chart positions | Album | Location |
|---|---|---|---|---|
| "Human Cannonball" | 1990 | 68 | Hybrid Vigor | AUS |
| "Tough It Out" | 1991 | 19 | Tough It Out | Billboard Mainstream Rock chart |

== Filmography ==
- Paradise Park (1991)
- Corn Flicks (1992) consisted of three short films, including:

- Webb Wilder Private Eye

- Grand prize winner of the Texas Union National Student Film Competition
- Aired repeatedly on the A&E Network and the USA Network show Night Flight

- Horror Hayride

- Won Silver Hugo Award at the Chicago International Film Festival
- Awarded three stars by the Chicago Tribune
- Presented at the New Orleans Film & Video and Dallas Video Festivals

- Aunt Hallie

- The Thing Called Love (1993) Ned
- Pueblo Sin Suerte (2002) Reb
- Born to be Wilder (2005) Himself
- Scattergun (2007)
- Webb Wilder Amazing B-Picture Shorts (2009)

== See also ==
- Outlaw country
- Progressive country
