= Marc JB =

British music producer

Marc JB (or Marc Jackson Burrows) is a British music producer, multi instrumentalist & DJ who is part of the production team that had a number one on the UK Dance Chart with "Thunder in My Heart Again" by Meck featuring Leo Sayer.

As Bimbo Jones, he produces in partnership with DJ Lee Dagger and together they have produced and remixed many tracks by other artists, including Kanye West, Britney Spears, Janet Jackson and Yoko Ono. They have many of their remixes cut to the original video on YouTube. With original tunes and remixes they have secured 90 no.1s in the UK and US dance charts. They were nominated as world's best remixer 6 years in a row at WMC (Miami Winter Music Conference)

Marc JB, Lee Dagger and house music vocalist Katherine Ellis as Bimbo Jones. In 2006 had a UK hit in 2006 with "Harlem One Stop" reaching number 1 in the UK Dance charts.

Marc JB writes production music and has an extensive repotoire playing across global film and TV with music featured in Tomb Raider and on the BBC, Netflix amongst others.

As a DJ Marc has been one of the first pioneers of the Ecstatic Dance scene, running a night in South East London and DJing at events and festivals including Glastonbury Festival, Ada Divine Awakening, Butiba (Latvia) & Ecstatic Dance UK.

== Discography ==
=== Singles ===
- 2006 "Harlem One Stop" (with Bimbo Jones)
- 2006 "Thunder in My Heart Again" (Meck featuring Leo Sayer)

=== Remixes ===
- Unstoppable - Goldlock & Octagon
- Shake It - The Outhere Brothers
- Grace Kelly - Mika
- Goodbye - Hi on Life featuring Joniece
- Don't Mess with my Man - Booty Luv
- What a Feeling - The Hughes Corporation
- Fade - Solu Music
- Piece of Me - Britney Spears
- Float Away - Robbie Rivera
- Fascination - Alphabeat
- With Love - Hilary Duff
- U + Ur Hand - Pink
- Who Knew - Pink
- In My Arms - Plumb
- Take It Like Man - Dragonette
- Rainy Monday - Shiny Toy Guns
- Band of Gold - Kimberley Locke
- Nothin' Better to Do - LeAnn Rimes
- Give It All You Got - Ultra Nate featuring Chris Willis
- Like a Boy - Ciara
- Turn Around - Samantha Jade
- Guilty - De Souza featuring Shèna
- Where's the Pleasure - Protocol
- Superfreak - Beatfreakz
- So Excited - Janet Jackson
- Sleep - Texas
- Industry - The Modern
- A Thousand Beautiful Things - Annie Lennox
- You and Me - Uniting Nations
- This Is My Time - Terri Walker
- These Boots Are Made for Walking - Jessica Simpson
- Round Round - Bodyrockers
- Oh - Ciara
- Joy - Staxx
- I Wanna Know What Love Is - Systematik
- I Said Never Again (But Here We Go Again) - Rachel Stevens
- I Like the Way - Bodyrockers
- Foolish - Tyler James
- Desire - Geri Halliwell
- Caught Up - Usher
- These Words - Natasha Bedingfield
- Goodies - Ciara
- The Trouble with Love Is - Kelly Clarkson
- Say Something Anyway - Bellefire
- Let the Music Take You - Keshia Chanté
- Common Ground - Jaimeson
- I'll Be There - Emma Bunton
- I Like You - DJ Trix
- Fresh - Kool & the Gang featuring Liberty X
- Everybody Cries - Liberty X
- Too Far Gone - Lisa Scott-Lee
- Sweet Dreams My L.A. Ex - Rachel Stevens
- Sunshine - Gareth Gates
- Sundown - S Club 8
- Stop Sign - Abs
- Passion - Amen! UK
- Love Ain't Gonna Wait - S Club
- Lately - Lisa Scott-Lee
- It's Your Duty - Lene
- I Just Wanna Say - Michelle Lawson
- Come On Over - Kym Marsh
- Without Love - Sun
