= Sunrise (Simply Red song) =

2003 single by Simply Red

Single by Simply Red

from the album Home
- B-side: "Positively 4th Street" (live); "Home Loan Blues" (live)
- Released: 17 March 2003
- Studio: Metropolis (London, England)
- Length: 3:19
- Label: simplyred.com
- Songwriters: Mick Hucknall; Daryl Hall; John Oates; Sara Allen
- Producer: Andy Wright

Simply Red singles chronology
| "Your Eyes" (2000) | "Sunrise" (2003) | "Fake" (2003) |

Music video
- "Sunrise" on YouTube

"Sunrise" is a song by English musical group Simply Red. It was released on 17 March 2003 as the first single from their eighth studio album, Home (2003), as well as the first single from frontman Mick Hucknall's new record label, simplyred.com. Heavily based on Hall & Oates' 1981 song "I Can't Go for That (No Can Do)", "Sunrise" peaked at number seven on the UK Singles Chart, number three in Canada, and number one on the US Billboard Dance Club Play chart.

== Content ==
The song contains samples of Hall & Oates's 1981 hit "I Can't Go for That (No Can Do)" and incorporates some of its lyrics.

== Reception ==
David Jeffries of AllMusic panned the track, calling it the worst on its parent album. He added: "Hall & Oates get sampled and credited, but the vocal hook from Ace's "How Long" gets lifted without acknowledgment. It sounds as shoddy as one of the song-combining "mash-up" bootlegs that swept through the U.K., and could be a cover-up for Hucknall's lack of songwriting ideas."

== Music video ==
The video for "Sunrise" was shot on the outskirts of Rio de Janeiro. It was filmed in February 2003 at the Das Canoas house designed by the Brazilian architect Oscar Niemeyer for himself, which has since been open to the public.

== Track listings ==
UK CD1

1. "Sunrise" – 3:18
2. "Sunrise" (Love to Infinity classic mix) – 6:50
3. "Sunrise" (Love to Infinity club mix) – 7:51
4. Enhanced section: video/making of the video

UK CD2

1. "Sunrise" (live at Ronnie Scott's)
2. "Positively 4th Street" (live at Ronnie Scott's)
3. "Home Loan Blues" (live at Ronnie Scott's)

European CD single

1. "Sunrise" – 3:18
2. "Sunrise" (Love to Infinity classic mix) – 6:50
3. Enhanced section: video/making of the video

Australian CD single

1. "Sunrise" – 3:18
2. "Sunrise" (Motivo Hi-Lectro radio mix) – 3:25
3. "Sunrise" (Love to Infinity radio mix) – 3:11
4. "Sunrise" (live) – 3:18
5. "Positively 4th Street" (live) – 4:32

Japanese CD single

1. "Sunrise"
2. "Sunrise" (Motivo Hi-Lectro radio mix)
3. "Sunrise" (Love to Infinity club mix)

Canadian CD single

1. "Sunrise" – 3:18
2. "Sunrise" (Motivo Hi-Lectro radio mix) – 3:25
3. "Sunrise" (Love to Infinity radio mix) – 3:11
4. "Sunrise" (Motivo Hi-Lectro mix) – 6:14
5. "Sunrise" (Motivo Hi-Lectro dub) – 6:42
6. "Sunrise" (Love to Infinity club mix) – 7:51
7. "Sunrise" (Love to Infinity classic mix) – 6:50
8. "Sunrise" (video)
9. Making of the video

== Credits and personnel ==
Credits are lifted from the Home album booklet.

Studio

- Recorded at Metropolis Studios (London, England)

Personnel

- Mick Hucknall – words, music, original version production
- Daryl Hall – words, music ("I Can't Go for That (No Can Do)")
- John Oates – words, music ("I Can't Go for That (No Can Do)")
- Sara Allen – words, music ("I Can't Go for That (No Can Do)")
- Andy Wright – production, mixing
- Gota Yashiki – original version production

== Charts ==
=== Weekly charts ===
| Chart (2003) | Peak position |
|---|---|
| Australia (ARIA) | 35 |
| Austria (Ö3 Austria Top 40) | 25 |
| Belgium (Ultratop 50 Flanders) | 35 |
| Belgium (Ultratop 50 Wallonia) | 22 |
| Canada (Nielsen SoundScan) | 3 |
| Europe (Eurochart Hot 100) | 15 |
| France (SNEP) | 17 |
| Germany (GfK) | 14 |
| Greece (IFPI) | 4 |
| Hungary (Rádiós Top 40) | 24 |
| Ireland (IRMA) | 14 |
| Italy (FIMI) | 4 |
| Netherlands (Dutch Top 40) | 4 |
| Netherlands (Single Top 100) | 6 |
| New Zealand (Recorded Music NZ) | 11 |
| Portugal (AFP) | 4 |
| Romania (Romanian Top 100) | 17 |
| Scotland Singles (OCC) | 9 |
| Switzerland (Schweizer Hitparade) | 22 |
| UK Singles (OCC) | 7 |
| US Bubbling Under Hot 100 (Billboard) | 22 |
| US Adult Contemporary (Billboard) | 5 |
| US Adult Pop Airplay (Billboard) | 36 |
| US Dance Club Songs (Billboard) Love to Infinity & ATFC remixes | 1 |

=== Year-end charts ===
| Chart (2003) | Position |
|---|---|
| Germany (Media Control GfK) | 76 |
| Italy (FIMI) | 17 |
| Netherlands (Dutch Top 40) | 7 |
| Netherlands (Single Top 100) | 41 |
| Romania (Romanian Top 100) | 69 |
| Switzerland (Schweizer Hitparade) | 88 |
| UK Singles (OCC) | 63 |
| US Adult Contemporary (Billboard) | 27 |

| Chart (2004) | Position |
|---|---|
| US Adult Contemporary (Billboard) | 24 |

== Certifications ==
| Region | Certification | Certified units/sales |
|---|---|---|
| Canada (Music Canada) | Gold | 5,000^{^} |
| New Zealand (RMNZ) | Gold | 15,000^{‡} |
| United Kingdom (BPI) Sales since 2011 | Gold | 400,000^{‡} |
^{^} Shipments figures based on certification alone.^{‡} Sales+streaming figures based on certification alone.

== Release history ==
| Region | Date | Format(s) | Label(s) | Ref. |
|---|---|---|---|---|
| United Kingdom | 17 March 2003 | CD; cassette | simplyred.com | |
| Japan | 21 March 2003 | CD | Victor | |
| Australia | 26 May 2003 | CD | simplyred.com | |
| United States | 26 June 2003 | Hot adult contemporary radio | simplyred.com | |
| United States | 21 July 2003 | Smooth jazz radio | simplyred.com | |

== See also ==
- List of Billboard number-one dance singles of 2003
