= Hugh Turvey =

British photographer

Hugh Turvey (born 5 June 1971) is a British artist, photographer and experimentalist who works primarily with X-ray technology. His work fuses art and science, graphic design and pure photography. In September 2014, he was awarded an honorary fellowship by the Royal Photographic Society in recognition of his work as an advocate for imaging innovation and its role in the advancement of science and understanding.

== Life and education ==
Hugh Robert Turvey was born in Chippenham, Wiltshire, the first child of Rodney and Patricia Turvey. He studied at Swindon Art College (1989–1990) and the Royal Berkshire College of Art and Design (1990–1992), before enrolling at Blackpool and The Fylde College, in Lancashire, to study photography (1992–1994).

Turvey's early creative influences came from Russian Constructivist concepts (most notably the work of Alexander Rodchenko) and the extensive and innovative high-speed and stroboscopic photographic studies of Dr Harold E Edgerton.

== Career ==
Turvey's early career was spent working as an apprentice to photographer Gered Mankowitz, one of the UK's leading rock photographers. During this period he began experimenting with x-ray/shadow photography on a commission to create a 'revealing' image for an album cover, for which he sought advice from the head of radiology at the Royal Free Hospital in London.

Realising the parallels between x-ray and photography, Hugh began working on a new type of Rayogram, wherein the object's shadow was not only exterior, but also interior, thus depicting its inner structure and density. He defines these images as 'Xograms' and differentiates them from photograms by the frequency of the 'light' used to expose the 'paper'.

Hugh's work attracted the interest of the Science Photo Library, who encouraged him to produce an extensive series of coloured x-rays of everyday objects, which were eventually published during 1999 in the Observer's LIFE magazine. The same year, Credit Suisse commissioned Hugh to produce six 'motion x-ray' European TV commercials, which subsequently went on to win awards at the 1999 ITVA Festival in Köln, Germany.

In 2005 Hugh with Artemi Kyriacou were invited by www.britishcouncil.org/Ukraine to go to Kiev and represent the UK at the "European Day" in Independence Square following their winning entries in the Novartis/Daily Telegraph Visions of Science photographic awards that year.

Following the 'x-perimentalist' exhibition at the Gallery@Oxo, Southbank, London in 2009, Turvey undertook a six-month residency at Yeovil District Hospital, working on a Wellcome Trust sponsored public engagement project entitled 'inr-i'. He curated the resulting artwork to form a touring exhibition that has been showing in hospitals throughout the UK since.

In 2009, Hugh was also appointed permanent Artist in Residence at the British Institute of Radiology (BIR). One of his earliest projects in the role was a collaboration with the Department of Specialist Imaging at University College Hospital on a series of artworks drawn from multi-sequence MRI scans of the prostate, which are used in the detection of small foci of prostate cancer.

In 2011, Turvey produced the X-ray imagery for the film Et Soudain, Tout Le Monde Me Manque (The Day I Saw Your Heart) which was directed by Jennifer Devoldère. Hugh makes a cameo as a gallery visitor in the final scene which was shot at the Galerie Anne de Villepoix in Paris.

In November 2011 Hugh released the X is for X-Ray iPad app through Touch Press.

As well as collaborations with technology developers and motion film directors, Hugh has also worked closely with architects and interior designers, the 2012 refurbishment of the Maslow Hotel in Johannesburg being among his largest projects. The artist's Flora series of Xograms are used as a key motif that runs throughout the building.

Hugh returned to the Gallery@Oxo with a new solo exhibition, X-POSÉ: Material and Surface, in February 2014, which was reprised in the following month at Artopia Gallery in St. Katharine Docks, London. As an artist represented by London Contemporary Art (LCA), Hugh's Xogram work has featured in a number of group art-fair exhibitions around the world. It has also been widely featured in national and international newspaper articles and magazines and is held in a number of private and public collections, including permanent displays in Sir Isaac's Loft at the Franklin Institute Science Museum, Philadelphia and the BIR.

As an advocate for x-ray, part of the artist's residency role with the BIR is one of outreach. As such, Hugh is a regular public speaker at events like the 2014 Edinburgh Science Festival, where he also created a site-specific video installation.

Alongside his artistic practice, Hugh is a pioneering creative practitioner for better healthcare environments. He has worked on large-scale art installation projects in hospitals in Germany, UK and USA. He is currently part of a 'communicative' art research team at University College Hospital, London, which is thinking about ways to improve patient experience.

== Gustoimages ==
Gustoimages is a limited company set up by Hugh Turvey and Artemi Kyriacou to enable collaborative working on larger projects. Commercial commissions include an ongoing collaboration between Gustoimages and Waitrose UK to create the packaging for chef Heston Blumenthal's 'Heston from Waitrose' range.
