= Ian Kirkham =

English saxophonist

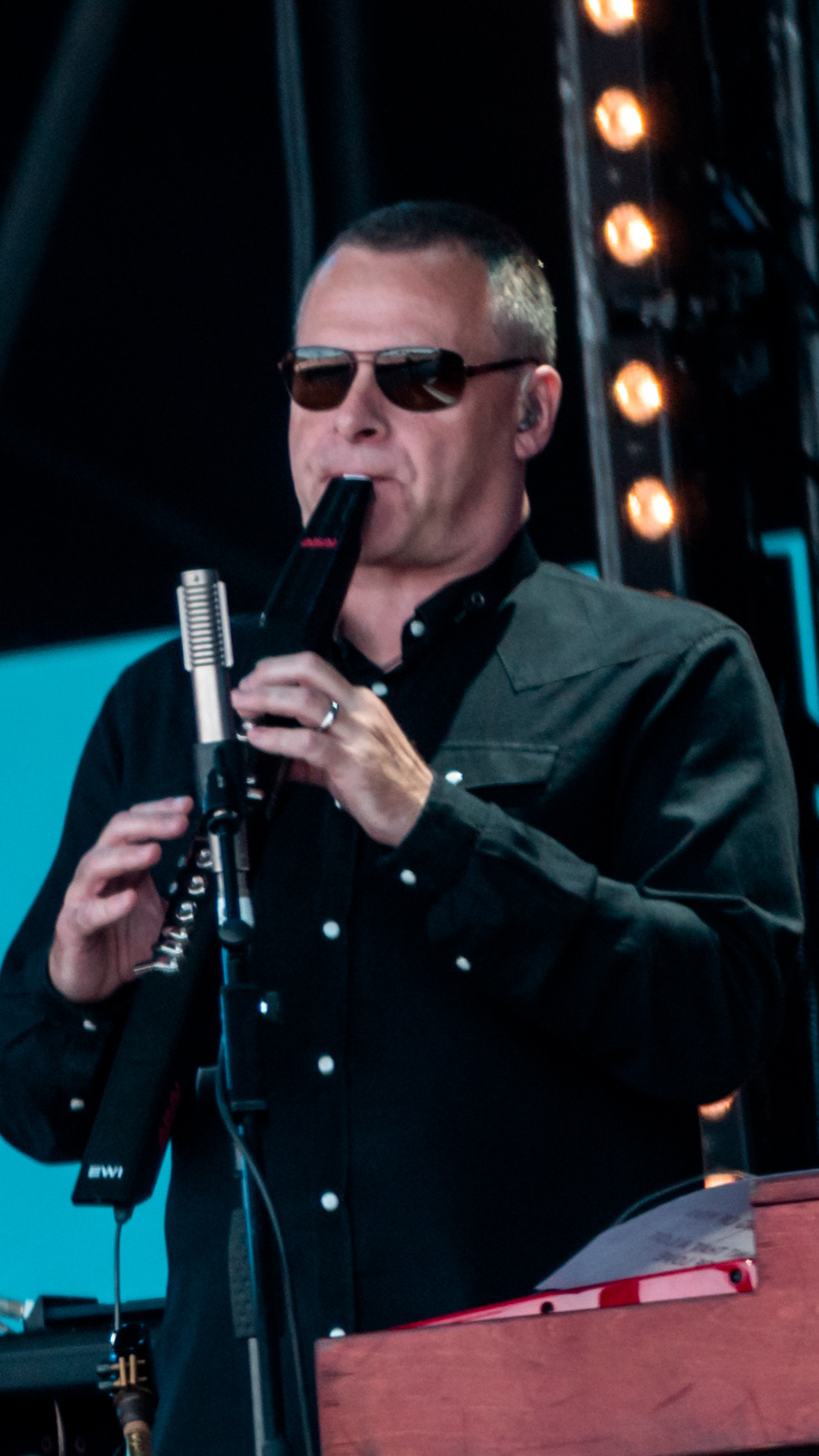
- Kirkham with Simply Red in 2019.

Background information
- Born: 9 March 1963 (age 63); Liverpool, Lancashire, England
- Genres: Pop; R&B; blue-eyed soul
- Occupation: Musician
- Instrument: Tenor, alto, soprano and baritone saxophones
- Labels: Elektra; East West
- Member of: Simply Red
- Website: simplyred.com

Ian Kirkham (born 9 March 1963, in Liverpool, Lancashire) is an English saxophonist, best known for his playing with Simply Red.

== Career ==
Kirkham was born in Liverpool and grew up in Preston. He started learning piano at the age of five, and saxophone at eleven.

He played saxophone with the British soul and pop band Simply Red from 1986 until the band retired in 2010.

He reprised his role in the band when it reformed in 2015, and played on their 2019 album, Blue Eyed Soul. He is the second longest running member of the band, behind founder and lead vocalist Mick Hucknall.

In 2025, Ian Kirkham appeared with Simply Red on The Tonight Show Starring Jimmy Fallon, performing with the band as part of its television appearances.
