= Andy Wright (music producer) =

English music producer and songwriter

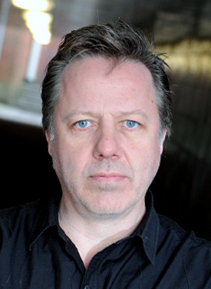

Background information
- Born: 1962 (age 63–64); Arnold, Nottinghamshire, England
- Genres: Pop, classical, soul, rock, dance
- Occupations: Music producer, songwriter
- Years active: c. 1984–present
- Website: www.andywrightmusic.com

Andy M Wright (born 1962) is an English musician, producer and songwriter. Since the mid-1980s he has worked as a programmer, keyboard player, session musician, musical arranger, and producer.

== Career ==
Beginning in the mid-1980s, Wright played and performed in various bands and worked for a keyboard and equipment rental company in London, delivering and setting up instruments and studio gear for recording sessions. He was subsequently employed at Trident Studios, London, over several years. Whilst at Trident he played and programmed keyboards on sessions for many of the major acts of the time.

During the 1990s, Wright set up his first recording studio in Primrose Hill in London, working with the KLF on their song "America: What Time Is Love?" and Massive Attack on their album Protection. 1995 saw the beginning of Wright's long working relationship with Simply Red on the album Life.

In 1999, Wright was involved in the production of the Eurythmics album Peace, which included the hit singles "I Saved the World Today", "17 Again" and the title track "Peace". In 2000, Wright began working with guitarist Jeff Beck. The resulting album, You Had It Coming, produced the Grammy award-winning track Dirty Mind in the best rock instrumental performance category.

In 2003, Wright and Jeff Beck worked together again on Jeff.

== Recent Works ==
- 2025 Simply Red - Recollections
- 2025 Simple Minds - Live in the City of Diamonds
- 2024 Betty Boo - Rip Up The Rulebook
- 2023 Simply Red – Time
- 2022 Simple Minds – Direction of the Heart
- 2022 Betty Boo – Boomerang
- 2022 Gilbert O' Sullivan – Driven
- 2022 Andreas Vollenweider – Slow Flow & Dancer
- 2019 Simply Red – Blue Eyed Soul
- 2018 Echo & The Bunnymen – The Stars, The Oceans and The Moon
- 2018 Simple Minds – Walk Between Worlds
- 2018 Various Artists – Eighties Symphonic Album
- 2016 Simple Minds – Acoustic
- 2016 Keith Harkin – On Mercy Street
- 2016 Nell Bryden – Bloom
- 2015 Simply Red – Big Love
- 2015 Bill Wyman – Back to Basics
- 2014 Simple Minds – Big Music
- 2014 Chrissie Hynde – Stockholm
- 2012 Mick Hucknall – American Soul
- 2010 Imelda May – Mayhem
- 2009 - Toše Proeski - The Hardest Thing
- 2008 Mick Hucknall – Tribute to Bobby
- 2005 Simply Red – Simplified
- 2003 Simply Red – Home
- 2003 Annie Lennox – A Thousand Beautiful Things
