= Life (Simply Red album) =

Studio album by Simply Red
- Released: 9 October 1995
- Recorded: September 1994 – July 1995
- Studios: Planet 4 Studios (Manchester, England) AIR Studios (London, England) Whitfield Street Studios (London, England) Downtown Studios (Johannesburg, South Africa)
- Genres: Blue eyed-soul, pop, dance, funk
- Length: 47:18
- Label: East West Records
- Producers: Mick Hucknall; Stewart Levine

Simply Red chronology
The Montreux EP (1992)	Life (1995)	Greatest Hits (1996)

Singles from Life
- 1. "Fairground" Released: 18 September 1995; 2. "Remembering the First Time" Released: 4 December 1995; 3. "Never Never Love" Released: 12 February 1996; 4. "We're in This Together" Released: 10 June 1996

Professional ratings
Review scores
Source	Rating
AllMusic	3/5 stars
Los Angeles Times	2/4 stars
Music & Media	(favorable)
Music Week	4/5 stars
NME	6/10
Rolling Stone	4/5 stars
Smash Hits	4/5 stars

Life is the fifth studio album by British pop and soul band Simply Red, released in 1995. The lead single "Fairground" became their first number 1 hit in the UK. Due to this success, the album also made #1 on the UK album chart. It also included "We're in This Together", the official theme song for Euro '96. This was also the last album to feature band members Fritz McIntyre and Heitor TP.

== Track listing ==
All songs composed by Mick Hucknall. "Fairground" contains a sample of "Give It Up" by The Good Men, written by René ter Horst, Gaston Steenkist and Sérgio Mendes.

1. "You Make Me Believe" – 3:51
2. "So Many People" – 5:19
3. "Lives and Loves" – 3:21
4. "Fairground" – 5:33
5. "Never Never Love" – 4:19
6. "So Beautiful" – 4:58
7. "Hillside Avenue" – 4:45
8. "Remembering the First Time" – 4:43
9. "Out on the Range" – 6:00
10. "We're in This Together" – 4:14

=== 2008 Special Edition bonus tracks ===
11. "Fairground" (Rollo and Sister Bliss Remix) – 9:06
12. "Remembering the First Time" (Satoshi Tomie Classic 12" Mix) – 8:53
13. "Never Never Love" (Too Precious Club Radio Mix) – 4:22
14. "We're in This Together" (Universal Feeling Mix) – 4:15
15. "You Make Me Believe" (Howie B Mix) – 4:01

== Personnel ==
Simply Red

- Mick Hucknall – lead vocals, backing vocals, guitars, bass, string arrangements
- Fritz McIntyre – keyboards, backing vocals
- Ian Kirkham – keyboards, saxophones, EWI
- Heitor TP – guitars
- Dee Johnson – backing vocals

Guest musicians

- Andy Wright – keyboards, programming, string arrangements
- Robbie Shakespeare – bass guitar
- Bootsy Collins – bass guitar
- Sly Dunbar – drums, programming
- Ritchie Stevens – drums
- Danny Cummings – percussion
- Hugh Masekela – flugelhorn
- Umoja Singers Chorale – choir
- The London Metropolitan Orchestra – strings
- Caroline Dale – string arrangements and conductor

The video for "Never Never Love" featured several women, including British actresses Billie Whitelaw and Stephanie Beacham, and fashion models like Kirsten Owen, for example.

Production

- Mick Hucknall – producer
- Stewart Levine – producer
- Roland Herrington – engineer, mixing
- Femi Jiya – engineer, mixing
- Jake Davies – assistant engineer
- Aiden Love – assistant engineer
- Bernard O'Reilly – assistant engineer
- Andy Strange – assistant engineer
- Bernie Grundman – mastering at Bernie Grundman Mastering (Hollywood, California)
- Merv Pearson – album coordinator
- Mat Cook – art direction, design
- Zanna – art direction, photography

== Charts ==
=== Weekly charts ===
Weekly chart performance for Life
Chart (1995–1996)	Peak position
Australian Albums (ARIA)	7
Austrian Albums (Ö3 Austria)	1
Belgian Albums (Ultratop Flanders)	4
Belgian Albums (Ultratop Wallonia)	3
Canada Top Albums/CDs (RPM)	30
Danish Albums (Hitlisten)	2
Dutch Albums (Album Top 100)	3
European Albums (Top 100)	1
Finnish Albums (Suomen virallinen lista)	14
German Albums (Offizielle Top 100)	1
Hungarian Albums (MAHASZ)	29
Irish Albums (IRMA)	1
Italian Albums (FIMI)	2
Japanese Albums (Oricon)	32
New Zealand Albums (RMNZ)	3
Norwegian Albums (VG-lista)	11
Portuguese Albums (AFP)	1
Scottish Albums (Official Charts)	1
Spanish Albums (PROMUSICAE)	5
Swedish Albums (Sverigetopplistan)	2
Swiss Albums (Schweizer Hitparade)	1
UK Albums (Official Charts)	1
US Billboard 200	75
Zimbabwean Albums (ZIMA)	1

=== Year-end charts ===
1995 year-end chart performance for Life
Chart (1995)	Position
Australian Albums (ARIA)	91
Austrian Albums (Ö3 Austria)	23
Belgian Albums (Ultratop Flanders)	35
Dutch Albums (Album Top 100)	46
European Albums (Top 100)	19
German Albums (Offizielle Top 100)	26
New Zealand Albums (RMNZ)	40
Swedish Albums & Compilations (Sverigetopplistan)	29
Swiss Albums (Schweizer Hitparade)	43
UK Albums (OCC)	4

1996 year-end chart performance for Life
Chart (1996)	Position
Australian Albums (ARIA)	41
Dutch Albums (Album Top 100)	38
European Albums (Top 100)	32
German Albums (Offizielle Top 100)	33
UK Albums (OCC)	44

== Certifications and sales ==
Certifications and sales for Life
Region	Certification	Certified units/sales
Australia (ARIA)	Platinum	70,000^{^}
Austria (IFPI Austria)	Platinum	50,000^{*}
Belgium (BRMA)	Gold	25,000^{*}
France (SNEP)	Gold	100,000^{*}
Germany (BVMI)	Platinum	500,000^{^}
Italy (FIMI)	2× Platinum	200,000^{*}
Netherlands (NVPI)	Platinum	100,000^{^}
New Zealand (RMNZ)	Platinum	15,000^{^}
Spain (Promusicae)	Platinum	100,000^{^}
Switzerland (IFPI Switzerland)	Gold	25,000^{^}
United Kingdom (BPI)	5× Platinum	1,500,000^{^}
Summaries
Europe (IFPI)	3× Platinum	3,000,000^{*}
Worldwide	—	5,500,000
^{*} Sales figures based on certification alone.^{^} Shipments figures based on certification alone.
