= Never Never Love (song) =

1996 single by Simply Red

Single by Simply Red

from the album Life
- Released: 12 February 1996
- Genre: Soul; funk; reggae
- Length: 4:21
- Label: EastWest
- Songwriter: Mick Hucknall
- Producer: Mick Hucknall

Simply Red singles chronology
"Remembering the First Time" (1995)	"Never Never Love" (1996)	"We're in This Together" (1996)

Music video
- "Never Never Love" on YouTube

"Never Never Love" is a song by British soul and pop band Simply Red. Written by frontman Mick Hucknall, it was featured on their fifth album, Life (1996), and reached number 18 on the UK chart when released in February 1996 by EastWest Records. The song additionally peaked at number seven in Hungary, number 22 in Israel and number 26 in Iceland. On the Eurochart Hot 100, it reached number 93 in March 1996. The accompanying music video features British actresses Billie Whitelaw, Rula Lenska and Stephanie Beacham.

== Critical reception ==
Larry Flick from Billboard magazine wrote, "Simply Red continues to be one of the more reliable sources for old-school soul that is more than a retread of familiar ideas." He explained that "as evident on this breezy number" Hucknall "aims to deconstruct the ideas triggered by his favorite old records with fresh new ones. Topped by winding organ lines and fuzzy funk guitar licks, the song mines a groove that snugly fits between jeep youth and classic disco—with just a touch of jazz to keep you alert." Kevin Courtney from Irish Times complimented it as a "sweet soul ballad". A reviewer from Music & Media declared it as a "mid-tempo soulful tune", while Newcastle Journal described it as a "beautiful slow ballad". In a retrospective review, Pop Rescue remarked, "This is a nice warm, chilled out track, complete with 'la la la-la la' vocal intro. Mick's vocals suit the bass and beats on this track." David Gaskey from The Rice Thresher called it "reggae", which "poses the powerful question, So now we've got our independence, what are we gonna do with it?".

== Track listings ==
- EW029CD1
1. "Never Never Love" (7-inch Radio Mix) (4:05)
2. "Fairground" (Live) (5:45)
3. "You Make Me Believe" (Merv's Amazon Mix) (4:47)
4. "Groovy Situation" (Live) (4:57)
- EW029CD2
1. "Never Never Love" (Too Precious 7-inch Mix) (4:17)
2. "Never Never Love" (DJ Muggs Master Mix) (3:51)
3. "Never Never Love" (DJ Muggs Instrumental Mix) (3:50)
4. "Never Never Love" (Grooving With the Angels Mix) (4:38)
5. "Never Never Love" (US R & B Mix) (4:18)
- EW029C cassette
1. "Never Never Love" (Too Precious 7-inch Mix) (4:05)
2. "Never Never Love" (7-inch Radio Edit) (4:07)

== Charts ==
=== Weekly charts ===
Chart (1996)	Peak position
Australia (ARIA)	42
Brazil (UPI)	2
Canada Adult Contemporary (RPM)	21
Europe (Eurochart Hot 100)	93
Hungary (Mahasz)	7
Iceland (Íslenski Listinn Topp 40)	26
Israel (Israeli Singles Chart)	22
Netherlands (Single Top 100 Tip)	3
Scottish Singles Sales (Official Charts)	26
UK Singles (Official Charts)	18
UK Airplay (Music Week)	2

=== Year-end charts ===
Chart (1996)	Position
UK Airplay (Music Week)	27
