= Nessie (film) =

2023 British-American comedy film

Nessie is a 2023 British-American family comedy film based on the original story by Catherine O'Reilly and Tim Churchill directed by Robbie Moffat and written by Moffat, Catherine O'Reilly and Tim Churchill. It stars Patrick Kilpatrick, John Michie, Tanya Fear and Stephanie Beacham. It won the best script award at the Monaco Film Festival.

== Plot ==
When an American billionaire dies and leaves $50 million to the rural Scottish village of Loch Ness, his furious son contests the will, forcing the villagers to prove that the Loch Ness Monster is real.

== Cast ==
- Patrick Kilpatrick as Brad
- John Michie as Jimmy
- Tanya Fear as Heather
- Stephanie Beacham as Samantha
- Jason Harvey as Geordie
- Edith Glad as Alice
- David Goodall as Robbie
- Caroline Guthrie as Moira
- Tim Churchill as Davie
- Gary Grant as Don
- Suzanne Kendall as Annie
- Ed Ward as Duncan

== Production ==
The film was titled Finding Nessie and Finding Nessie: Looking for the Legend at various stages during production.

Filming took place throughout 2022 at Loch Awe, Oban Airport, Glencruitten Golf Course, Argyll, Taynuilt and Ardchattan.

== Release ==
Nessie had its UK premiere on 5 August 2023 at the Grovenor Cinema in Glasgow before being released in selected Scottish cinemas.

== Reception ==
Nessie received three nominations at the Marbella International Film Festival: Patrick Kilpatrick was nominated for Best Actor, Suzanne Kendall for Best Actress and the film as a whole for Best Feature. It won best script at the Monaco film festival.
