= Fairground (song) =

1995 single by Simply Red

Single by Simply Red

from the album Life
- B-side: "Stars" (live); "The Right Thing" (live)
- Released: 18 September 1995
- Genre: Dance; Latin; pop; soul
- Length: 4:23 (single and video version); 5:34 (album version)
- Label: EastWest
- Songwriters: Mick Hucknall; René ter Horst; Gaston Steenkist; Sérgio Mendes
- Producers: Mick Hucknall; Stewart Levine

Simply Red singles chronology
| "Your Mirror" (1992) | "Fairground" (1995) | "Remembering the First Time" (1995) |

Music video
- "Fairground" on YouTube

"Fairground" is a song by British soul and pop band Simply Red, released on 18 September 1995 as the first single from the band's fifth album, Life (1995). Co-written and co-produced by frontman Mick Hucknall, the song makes extensive use of a sample of the Goodmen's 1993 hit "Give It Up".

Issued through EastWest Records, "Fairground" became Simply Red's first and only No. 1 single on the UK Singles Chart, staying at the top for four weeks in September and October 1995. It was also a chart hit in mainland Europe and Australia, but it failed to generate long-term success in North America. The accompanying music video for "Fairground" was directed by Michael Geoghegan and filmed in Blackpool Pleasure Beach, Lancashire.

== Background and release ==
When "Fairground" reached number one on the UK Singles Chart, it had already been released to UK radio stations for almost a month, via satellite with the first promotional copies following a few days later. The single was placed in heavy rotation on top-40 radio stations, which resulted in it reaching the top of the airplay charts. When the single was released to the public on 18 September 1995, it had already been the most played record on British radio.

== Composition ==
Producer Andy Wright has said that for "Fairground", Mick Hucknall wanted to do a Brazilian, carnival-style track. Whilst Hucknall was at the dentist for two hours, Wright had the idea to sample a record that he knew of: "Give It Up" by the Goodmen, which in turn samples "Fanfarra (Cabua-le-le)" by Sérgio Mendes. To round out the track, Fritz McIntyre played the house-style piano element, Ian Kirkham used the EWI (electronic wind instrument) to play the clarinet-style part, and Wright made the wobbly, dreamy sound heard in the verses.

== Critical reception ==
Swedish Aftonbladet noted the "hot rhythms and odd harmonies" of the song, adding that the album "would have needed even more such songs". AllMusic editor William Ruhlmann said that Mick Hucknall "opts for a Latin-tinged sound that ends up evoking Herb Alpert more than Milton Nascimento". Another AllMusic editor, Jon O'Brien, deemed the song "a mesmerizing fusion of tribal rhythms and ambient chillout pop". Larry Flick from Billboard magazine described it as an "expectedly romantic soul tune", writing, "Fueled by his now instantly familiar voice, the track combines old-school warmth with street-smart percussion that is largely derived from samples of 'Give It Up' by the Goodmen. At the core are wonderfully soothing lyrics and a melody that permanently sticks to the brain upon impact." Tom Ewing of Freaky Trigger commented that it "surprised people at the time, and on the verses at least it's their strangest-sounding single. Driving down an endless road... it begins, and that's not at all a bad description of the lonesome vibe here – the odd combination of flowing, tumbling Latin percussion and Hucknall's ruminative vocal, working together to create something genuinely arresting, even haunting." Pan-European magazine Music & Media named it Single of the Week, remarking that it is "totally different from Hucknall's previous singles but still very much him thanks to the one-in-a-million voice and the trademark composition." They added that "the fairground attraction" of the single is its "percussive arrangement and clubiness."

Music Week gave "Fairground" a top score of five out of five and named it Single of the Week, writing, "No wonder radio has leapt on this, a charmingly-delivered song which couples instant commerciality in the tune stakes with a hip tribal backing. Headed straight for the summit." Music Week editor Alan Jones said, "Despite its heavily syncopated underpinning, it is a stylish and straightforward pop song with Mick Hucknall's usual high calibre vocal and an instantly commercial chorus." Paul Moody from NME commented, "This time, after five years at the hairdressers, he gives us a Latino-shuffle that's already conquered all known radio stations and is about to invade every Top Five on the planet. Quite dull." People Magazine's reviewer wrote that the "energetic" song "combines soulful abandon with tribal ecstasy." David Gaskey from The Rice Thresher named it "an innovative, futuristic jazz/pop song inspired by a popular fairground outside of Milan." James Hamilton from the Record Mirror Dance Update found it "attractive". Mark Sutherland from Smash Hits stated that Hucknall "still has a lovely singing voice". However, he felt the song "sort of tinkles along merrily without really going anywhere." Another Smash Hits editor, Helen Lamont, noted that it has a "a dance feel", describing it as "very mellow and very soulful and very, very laid-back."

== Chart performance ==
It was the first and only single by the group to reach No. 1 on the UK Singles Chart. It spent four weeks at the top and 14 weeks in the top 40. As of October 2018, the single has sold 718,463 copies according to the Official Charts Company. The track also reached No. 1 in Ireland and Italy and peaked within the top 10 in more than 10 countries, including Australia, Germany, Israel, New Zealand and Zimbabwe. A remix by Soulshock and Karlin was included on the US single release and received moderate success on R&B radio but failed to chart on the Billboard Hot 100, peaking at No. 14 on the Bubbling Under Hot 100.

In 2012, "Fairground" was ranked No. 47 in NME's list of the "50 best-selling tracks of the 90s", adding: "Shamelessly lifting the clattering samba percussion from The Goodmen's 'Give It Up' (but giving due credit), Mick Hucknall greeted his post-'Stars' future with a mid-tempo ballad that sounded like an on-the-money dance track. Everyone got on board the rollercoaster and Hucknall had a new diamond for his gnasher."

== Music video ==
A music video was produced to promote the single, directed by Irish filmmaker Michael Geoghegan. The video (which uses the shorter single version) shows Mick Hucknall driving in his Jaguar XK140 to and singing at Blackpool Pleasure Beach in Blackpool, Lancashire, that had been closed for the day and had been invaded by a group of his friends and opened up again. The majority of the video was shot on the Pepsi Max Big One and around the park, and some scenes are shot on the Promenade showing the Illuminations in 1994. Filming credits go to the single cameraman, Steven Young.

== Track listings ==
- UK CD1 and Japanese CD single
1. "Fairground" (single edit) – 4:23
2. "Fairground" (extended single mix) – 5:32
3. "Stars" (live) – 4:12
4. "The Right Thing" (live) – 4:31
- UK CD2 and Australasian CD single
1. "Fairground" (single edit) – 4:23
2. "Fairground" (extended single mix) – 5:32
3. "Fairground" (In the Garden mix) – 5:32
4. "Fairground" (Too Precious remix) – 7:50
5. "Fairground" (Rollo and Sister Bliss remix) – 9:42
- UK and Australasian cassette single
1. "Fairground" (single edit) – 4:23
2. "Fairground" (extended single mix) – 5:32
- European CD single
1. "Fairground" (single edit) – 4:23
2. "Fairground" (In the Garden mix) – 5:32
- US CD single
1. "Fairground" (single edit)
2. "Fairground" (Rollo and Sister Bliss remix)
3. "Fairground" (Too Precious remix)
4. "Fairground" (Soul Power mix)
5. Snippets ("Hillside Avenue", "You Make Me Believe", "Never Never Love")
- US cassette single
1. "Fairground" (single edit)
2. Snippets ("Hillside Avenue", "You Make Me Believe", "Never Never Love")

== Charts ==
=== Weekly charts ===
| Chart (1995) | Peak position |
|---|---|
| Australia (ARIA) | 7 |
| Austria (Ö3 Austria Top 40) | 5 |
| Belgium (Ultratop 50 Flanders) | 2 |
| Belgium (Ultratop 50 Wallonia) | 10 |
| Denmark (IFPI) | 16 |
| Europe (Eurochart Hot 100) | 2 |
| Europe (European Hit Radio) | 1 |
| France (SNEP) | 26 |
| Germany (GfK) | 5 |
| Iceland (Íslenski Listinn Topp 40) | 8 |
| Ireland (IRMA) | 1 |
| Israel (Israeli Singles Chart) | 4 |
| Italy (Musica e dischi) | 1 |
| Italy Airplay (Music & Media) | 1 |
| Netherlands (Dutch Top 40) | 6 |
| Netherlands (Single Top 100) | 5 |
| New Zealand (Recorded Music NZ) | 6 |
| Poland Airplay (Music & Media) | 1 |
| Scottish Singles Sales (Official Charts) | 1 |
| Spain (AFYVE) | 6 |
| Sweden (Sverigetopplistan) | 17 |
| Switzerland (Schweizer Hitparade) | 6 |
| UK Singles (Official Charts) | 1 |
| UK Airplay (Music Week) | 1 |
| US Bubbling Under Hot 100 (Billboard) | 14 |
| US Dance Club Play (Billboard) | 25 |
| Zimbabwe (ZIMA) | 2 |

=== Year-end charts ===
| Chart (1995) | Position |
|---|---|
| Australia (ARIA) | 69 |
| Belgium (Ultratop 50 Flanders) | 25 |
| Belgium (Ultratop 50 Wallonia) | 65 |
| Europe (Eurochart Hot 100) | 17 |
| Europe (European Hit Radio) | 8 |
| France (SNEP) | 92 |
| Germany (Media Control) | 54 |
| Iceland (Íslenski Listinn Topp 40) | 55 |
| Israel (Israeli Singles Chart) | 37 |
| Latvia (Latvijas Top 50) | 11 |
| Netherlands (Dutch Top 40) | 30 |
| Netherlands (Single Top 100) | 33 |
| Switzerland (Schweizer Hitparade) | 55 |
| UK Singles (OCC) | 7 |
| UK Airplay (Music Week) | 3 |

== Certifications and sales ==
| Region | Certification | Certified units/sales |
|---|---|---|
| Australia (ARIA) | Gold | 35,000^{^} |
| Germany (BVMI) | Gold | 250,000^{^} |
| United Kingdom (BPI) | Platinum | 718,463 |
^{^} Shipments figures based on certification alone.

== Release history ==
| Region | Date | Format(s) | Label(s) | Ref. |
|---|---|---|---|---|
| United Kingdom | 18 September 1995 | CD; cassette | EastWest | |
| Australia | 25 September 1995 | CD; cassette | EastWest | |
| United States | 26 September 1995 | Contemporary hit radio | EastWest | |
| United States | 3 October 1995 | Rhythmic contemporary radio | EastWest | |
| Japan | 10 October 1995 | CD | EastWest Japan | |
