= We're in This Together (Simply Red song) =

Single by Simply Red

from the album Life
- Released: 10 June 1996
- Studio: NYNEX Arena
- Genre: Pop
- Length: 4:15
- Label: East West
- Songwriter: Mick Hucknall
- Producers: Mick Hucknall; Stewart Levine

Simply Red singles chronology
| "Never Never Love" (1996) | "We're in This Together" (1996) | "Angel" (1996) |

Music video
- "We're in This Together" on YouTube

"We're in This Together" is a song by British soul and pop band Simply Red. It was released by East West Records in June 1996 as the fourth and last single from their fifth album, Life (1996). The song was written and co-produced by frontman Mick Hucknall, and chosen as the official song for UEFA Euro 1996 held in England. Simply Red performed at both the opening and closing ceremony. The single reached number eight in the Czech Republic, number eleven in the UK and number thirteen in Scotland. On the Eurochart Hot 100, it peaked at number 39 in July 1996. The music video for the song was directed by London-based director Zanna.

== Critical reception ==
William Ruhlmann from AllMusic declared the song as a "big-time closer" and a "South African-style anthem", complete with Hugh Masekela's flugelhorn. Caroline Sullivan from The Guardian described "We're in This Together" as "hymnlike" and "lighters-aloft". Kevin Courtney from Irish Times wrote, "Simply Red's footie tune is a gospel style chant, Mick Hucknall playing the FA preacher man while the choir sings unto heaven and the drums beat out the soul stirring rhythms. With its redemptive tone and heartfelt sentiments, it sounds like a hymn to the Lord a prayer for peace, love and fair tackling." Connie Johnson from Los Angeles Times complimented its "solemn lushness". Taylor Parkes from Melody Maker noted that the song "is currently being played nine times a day on the BBC".

Alan Jones from Music Week wrote, "A rather stark and ponderous thing it is, too, although the percussively enhanced Universal Feeling mix is livelier. Its saving grâce is probably that a sublime sax solo is followed by a swelling chorus which finally summons up the stirring qualities it would have been nice to have had from the start." Dele Fadele from NME viewed it as "ultra-sentimental", remarking that Masakela adds a flugelhorn solo. In a 2014 retrospective review, Pop Rescue noted that the song "builds up and up with brass, choir, and motivational lyrics", stating that it "aims for epic, and earns its goal." Mary DeCicco from The Record felt that it has "messages of hope and affirmation". David Gaskey from The Rice Thresher described it as "soulful", using the talents of the Umoja Singers Chorale "to emphasize the theme of world unity."

== Track listing ==
CD single, UK (1996)
| No. | Title | Length |
|---|---|---|
| 1. | "We're in This Together" | 4:14 |
| 2. | "We're in This Together" (Universal Feeling Mix) | 4:15 |
| 3. | "Something Got Me Started" (Live) | 4:30 |
| 4. | "Money's Too Tight" (Live) | 5:35 |

CD maxi, Germany (1996)
| No. | Title | Length |
|---|---|---|
| 1. | "We're in This Together" (Album Version) | 4:14 |
| 2. | "We're in This Together" (Universal Feeling Mix) | 4:15 |
| 3. | "You Make Me Believe" (Live) | 5:42 |
| 4. | "Hillside Avenue" (Live) | 5:25 |

== Charts ==
| Chart (1996) | Peak position |
|---|---|
| Austria (Ö3 Austria Top 40) | 23 |
| Czech Republic (IFPI CR) | 8 |
| Europe (Eurochart Hot 100) | 39 |
| Germany (Official German Charts) | 32 |
| Israel (Israeli Singles Chart) | 28 |
| Netherlands (Dutch Top 40) | 28 |
| Netherlands (Single Top 100) | 34 |
| Scotland (OCC) | 13 |
| UK Singles (OCC) | 11 |
| UK Airplay (Music Week) | 14 |
