= Forever Young (2023 film) =

- Directed by: Henk Pretorious
- Written by: Henk Pretorius; Jennifer Nicole Stang; Greg Blyth
- Produced by: Cassian Elwes; Irfaan Fredericks; Llewelynn Greeff; Gareth Jones; Barend Kruger; Jed Tune
- Starring: Bernard Hill; Diana Quick; Stephanie Beacham; Julian Glover; Amy Tyger; Mark Jackson; Anna Wolf
- Cinematography: Lorenzo Levrini
- Edited by: Megan Gill
- Music by: Walter Mair
- Production company: Dark Matter Studios
- Release date: 24 June 2023
- Running time: 100 minutes
- Country: United Kingdom
- Language: English

Forever Young is a 2023 science-fiction-romance film directed by Henk Pretorious and written by Pretorious, Jennifer Nicole Stang and Greg Blyth. It stars Bernard Hill, Diana Quick, Stephanie Beacham, Amy Tyger and Mark Jackson and was released at film festivals on 12 June 2023 and then digitally on 26 January 2024.

== Synopsis ==
Acclaimed author Robyn Smith (Quick) becomes disillusioned with her childless and average life with her loving husband Oscar (Hill) until she stumbles across an old flame (Glover) who has invented a formula that reverses the aging process.

== Cast ==
- Diana Quick as Robyn Smith
- Bernard Hill as Oscar Smith
- Amy Tyger as Robyn Smith (Young)
- Mark Jackson as Jim Petrak (Young)
- Stephanie Beacham as Jane Green
- Anna Wolf as Anna Wolf
- Julian Glover as Jim Petrak (Older)
- Jack Bennett as Dan Jolly Good
- Gilbert Wynne as Ken
- Elizabeth Counsell as Janice
- Cleo Sylvestre as Angela
- Anabela Teixeira as Dr. Benito
- Sidney Kean as Mr. Green
- Seymour Matthews as William
- Alexandra D'Sa as Dr. Richards
- Lucinda Curtis as Celia

== Production ==
The film began production known as Age before being renamed Forever Now, and then again changed to Forever Young just before its theatrical release. Forever Young's official trailer was released on 11 October 2023.

== Reception ==
Forever Young received mixed reviews from critics. Cath Clarke of The Guardian praised Quick's performance, calling it "first rate in a second rate film", while criticising the script, naming it unserious and uninteresting". Kevin Maher of The Times, again lauded Quick's role but called the overall plot an "intensely peculiar tale".
