= The Queen's Traitor =

1967 British television series

The Queen's Traitor is a 1967 British television series directed by Campbell Logan and starring Nigel Green, Susan Engel and Stephanie Beacham. It portrays the Ridolfi plot, an attempt to overthrow Queen Elizabeth I and replace her with Mary, Queen of Scots. Broadcast in five weekly parts, all episodes were later wiped and are thought to be lost.
