= Remembering the First Time =

1995 single by Simply Red

Single by Simply Red

from the album Life
- Released: 4 December 1995
- Genre: Pop; house; soul
- Length: 4:44
- Label: EastWest
- Songwriter: Mick Hucknall
- Producer: Mick Hucknall

Simply Red singles chronology
"Fairground" (1995)	"Remembering the First Time" (1995)	"Never Never Love" (1996)

Music video
- "Remembering the First Time" on YouTube

"Remembering the First Time" is a song by British soul and pop band Simply Red. Written and produced by frontman Mick Hucknall, it was featured on their fifth album, Life (1995), and released by East West Records in December 1995 in a new remix for the single. It reached number 22 on the UK Singles Chart and number three on the UK Club Chart. The song also peaked at number seven in Iceland and became a top-20 hit in Israel, Latvia and Spain. On the Eurochart Hot 100, it reached number 80. The accompanying music video was directed by Irish filmmaker Michael Geoghegan.

== Critical reception ==
AllMusic editor William Ruhlmann complimented the song as "promising". Swedish Expressen wrote that it "is like browsing a tribute book about modern soul music; - Chic guitar, Dr. Dre synth, house piano and a breath-taking wind instrument arrangement that is sent down from the sky with Federal Express." Caroline Sullivan from The Guardian noted the song's "oscillating keyboard note". Kevin Courtney from Irish Times named it a "pseudo funky pop choon". A reviewer of Music Week gave it top score with five out of five, stating that it "is bound to follow in the footsteps of its successor, with the same up-beat melody and a refrain to stir heartstrings nationwide."

Calvin Bush from Muzik complimented Mick Hucknall for picking the right remixer for the track, writing, "Here, Dave Valentine's Self Preservation Society bin Mick's vocals, put their heads down and happily march to acid house land aimed with lancing beats and smokescreen strings". Dele Fadele from NME wrote, "'Remembering the First Time' is down to earth and direct, when it could have been more metaphorical." Brad Beatnik from the Record Mirror Dance Update gave it four out of five, saying "it might not be as immediate" as 'Fairground', but "is still a convincing combination of club class and commercial hooks." Jordan Paramor from Smash Hits gave it two out of five, saying it "sounds exactly the same" as its predecessor.

== Track listings ==
- EW015CD1
1. "Remembering the First Time" (radio disco mix) (4:36)
2. "Remembering the First Time" (album version) (4:42)
3. "Enough" (live) (5:45)
4. "A New Flame" (live) (4:35)
- EW015CD2
1. "Remembering the First Time" (Extended Cool Disco Mix) (5:30)
2. "Remembering the First Time" (SPS Mambo Mix) (9:00)
3. "Remembering the First Time" (Satoshi Tomiie Classic 12-inch mix) (8:51)
4. "Remembering the First Time" (Too Precious 12-inch dub) (7:14)
5. "Remembering the First Time" (Remembering the Ambient Times)
- 0630-13394-0 German 33 rpm 12-inch single

A1. "Remembering the First Time" (Satoshi Tomiie Classic 12-inch mix) (8:50)
A2. "Remembering the First Time" (7-inch Cool Disco Mix) (4:34)
B1. "Remembering the First Time" (A&G Division's Full Testament) (12:06)

- EW015C cassette
1. "Remembering the First Time" (radio disco mix) (4:36)
2. "Remembering the First Time" (Too Precious 12-inch mix) (7:14)

== Charts ==
=== Weekly charts ===
Chart (1995–1996)	Peak position
Europe (Eurochart Hot 100)	80
Europe (European Hit Radio)	6
Germany (GfK)	55
Iceland (Íslenski Listinn Topp 40)	7
Israel (Israeli Singles Chart)	14
Italy Airplay (Music & Media)	8
Latvia (Latvijas Top 50)	15
Netherlands (Dutch Top 40 Tipparade)	3
Netherlands (Single Top 100)	23
New Zealand (Recorded Music NZ)	30
Scottish Singles Sales (Official Charts)	23
Spain (AFYVE)	19
UK Singles (Official Charts)	22
UK Airplay (Music Week)	5
UK Club Chart (Music Week)	3

=== Year-end charts ===
Chart (1996)	Position
Latvia (Latvijas Top 50)	165

== Release history ==
Region	Date	Format(s)	Label(s)	Ref.
United Kingdom	4 December 1995	CD; cassette	EastWest	
Japan	21 December 1995	CD	EastWest Japan	
