= Super Bitch =

1973 film by Massimo Dallamano

- Italian film poster
- Italian: Si può essere più bastardi dell'ispettore Cliff?
- Directed by: Massimo Dallamano
- Screenplay by: Massimo Dallamano; Ross Mackenzie
- Story by: George P. Breakston
- Produced by: Fulvio Lucisano; Leonardo Pescarolo
- Starring: Ivan Rassimov; Stephanie Beacham; Patricia Hayes; Ettore Manni
- Cinematography: Jack Hildyard
- Edited by: Antonio Siciliano
- Music by: Riz Ortolani
- Production companies: Clodio Cinematografica; Italian International Film; Monymusk Productions
- Distributed by: Medusa Distribuzione (Italy); Hemdale (UK)
- Release date: 3 May 1973 (Italy)
- Running time: 97 minutes
- Countries: Italy; United Kingdom
- Languages: Italian; English
- Box office: 353 million lire

Super Bitch (Italian: Si può essere più bastardi dell'ispettore Cliff?, lit. 'Can anyone be more of a bastard than Inspector Cliff?'; also released in the UK as Blue Movie Blackmail, and in the US as Mafia Junction) is a 1973 poliziottesco film directed and co-written by Massimo Dallamano, and starring Ivan Rassimov, Stephanie Beacham, Patricia Hayes and Ettore Manni.

== Plot ==
Undercover narcotics agent Cliff Hoyst plays double agent to takedown two different gangs. Meanwhile, his lover Joanne is part of blackmail ring targeting London's wealthy elite.

== Cast ==
- Ivan Rassimov as Cliff Hoyst
- Stephanie Beacham as Joanne
- Patricia Hayes as Mamma the Turk
- Ettore Manni as Morrell
- Luciano Catenacci as Gamble
- Verna Harvey as Eva
- Giacomo Rossi-Stuart as Marco
- Cec Linder as the American Ambassador
- Michael Sheard as Williamson
- Giancarlo Prati as Cornelius
- Mario Novelli as Mustapha
- Leon Vitali
- Tutte Lemkow
- George Murcell
- Morris Perry
- Ben Carrà
- James Bate

Uncredited

- Camille Keaton as Paulette
- Gareth Thomas as Trenchcoated Detective
- Abdel Majid Majzaub as Lebanese Contact

== Production ==
Super Bitch was a co-production between Italian companies Clodio Cinematografica and Italian International Film, and British company Monymusk Productions. It was shot at Rome's Safa Palatino Studios, and on-location in London, Lebanon (Beirut and Baalbek) and Syria (Palmyra).

The film's score by Riz Ortolani would later be re-used in Red Rings of Fear.

== Release ==
Super Bitch was released in Italy on 3 May 1973 where it was distributed by Medusa. It grossed a total of 353,341,000 lire on its theatrical run in Italy. It was initially released in the United Kingdom under the title Blue Movie Blackmail where it was distributed by Hemdale. The English-language version of the film gave more emphasis to Stephanie Beacham's nude scenes than the thriller plot.

== Reception ==
In a contemporary review, the Monthly Film Bulletin described the film as "a competently, impersonally handled thriller fantasy" and "mere competence can do little to unify this kind of mongrel co-production, or to pump much life into its derivative synthetics".
