= Melanie Blake =

English talent agent and author

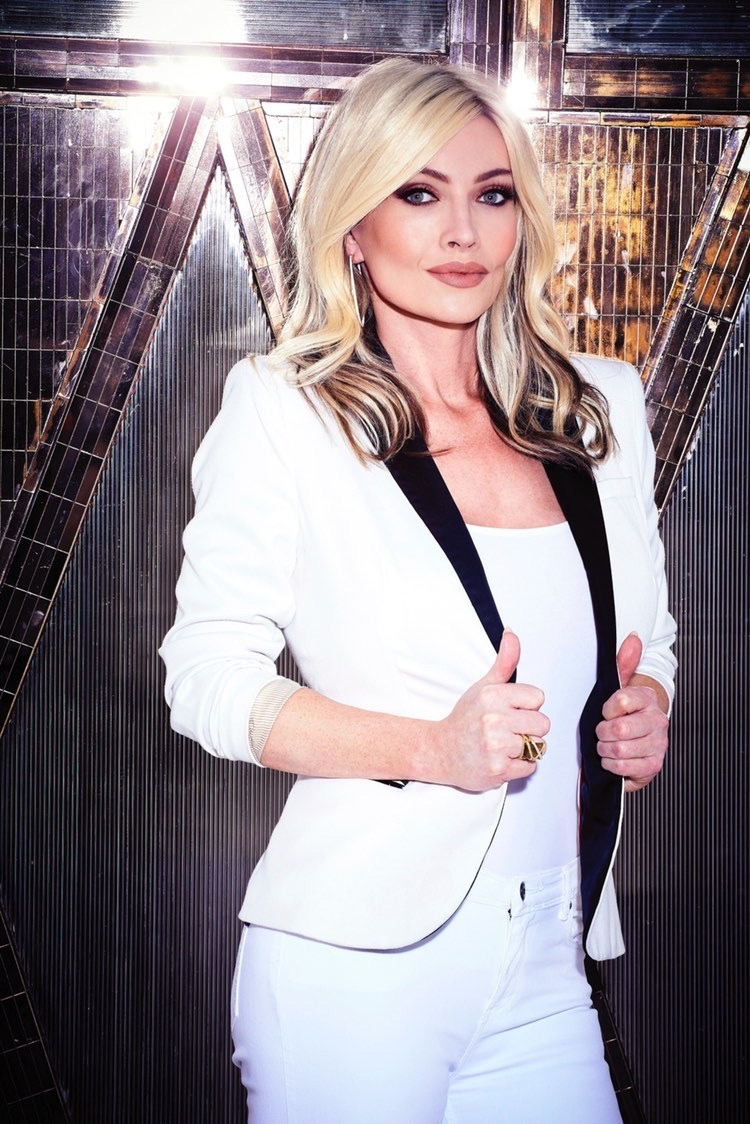
- Blake in 2021
- Born: Stockport, Greater Manchester, England
- Occupations: Author; columnist; talent agent
- Writing career
- Genre: Realist
- Website: melanieblakeonline.com

Melanie Blake is an English author, columnist and talent agent. Blake began her career working as a camera assistant on Top of the Pops and eventually formed her own music agency. After representing music stars, she formed an acting and PR agency which primarily represented soap actresses from British and American soap operas. In 2018, Blake made the decision to lessen her client list to focus on her writing career. She has since released three bestselling novels: The Thunder Girls (2018), Ruthless Women (2021), Guilty Women (2022) and Vengeful Women (2025), all of which were inspired by her experiences in both the music and soap industries.

== Early life ==
Blake was born in Stockport, Greater Manchester, to a mother who was a homemaker and a father who owned his own printing business. Blake described her early childhood as a normal working-class life until she was seven, when her father joined a religious cult. His cult's beliefs stated that anything that was not derived from the bible was a "false idol", which meant Blake was not allowed to watch television, read books or magazines or have posters on her wall. She put posters up inside of her wardrobe where she also hid a small television that she found in a skip; her father discarded of it all once again after he discovered them. He also gave their family's money to the church, which led to Blake's mother becoming a cleaner, feeding the family from food banks and clothing them from charity shops. Blake recalled her father smashing anything new that her mother had bought, as well as ripping a new outfit from her body, and one Christmas, Blake's father destroyed the family's presents.

Whilst at school, Blake was bullied for receiving free school meals. At the time, Blake had undiagnosed dyslexia, but was chastised by her teachers, who labelled her "stupid". She was also told by a teacher that her writing career would go nowhere, with her English teacher telling her that the only thing Blake would be writing is labels on factory boxes. Due to her experiences with her father and school, Blake became determined to succeed in her career. She moved out at 16, began squatting in a house with six strangers and lived on £1 a day. An underage Blake worked at public houses and saved her tips in the hopes to better her life. One night, she returned to her squat being boarded up and had to sleep in the garden shed. After learning of a scheme to aid homeless teens, she was given a council flat, which she said saved her life. After losing weight due to suffering from tonsillitis, getting contact lenses and dying her hair blonde, Blake began working in clubs to save up enough money to move to London with the intention of beginning a career in the entertainment industry.

== Career ==
=== 1996–2016: Early career and agent work ===
Upon moving to London, Blake sent out hundreds of letters to production companies and applied for every job she saw in entertainment. After a lot of rejection from jobs she had applied to, she made the decision to move back to Stockport in 1996; however, that same day, she received a call from an agent wanting her as a camera assistant on Top of the Pops. Blake lied by stating that she had experience as a camera assistant and initially found the job difficult due to her lack of experience, with colleagues noticing her lack of knowledge for the job. However, she eventually began to enjoy the job and defied managers' orders by conversing with the famous guests on the show. Examples include Blake telling Kylie Minogue that the lighting made her hair look blue, which she appreciated since no other staff members had thought to tell her, and informing Jennifer Lopez that the Top of the Pops team had been instructed not to talk to her, which Lopez was shocked by and grateful to Blake for telling her.

Whilst working at Top of the Pops, Blake began a career as a freelance journalist despite being untrained, writing for publishers including Hello! and was hired for work on the Here and Now Tours, which gave her a further insight into the music industry and dynamics of pop groups offering exclusive interviews to her newspapers columns. Speaking of her lack of experience for her work in the industry, Blake has been described as the "queen of the blag". Whilst in the car park at Elstree Studios, Blake met EastEnders actress Gillian Taylforth, who told Blake that she should work as an extra on the soap. Blake took her advice and appeared in the background of scenes in the Queen Vic, as well as doing further background acting on soaps Coronation Street and Emmerdale. This led to Claire King asking Blake to represent her and become her publicist, and afterwards, Blake began working as a talent agent. Blake's musical agency roster included Claire Richards and the Nolans, and after setting up her acting agency, she signed soap actresses such as Taylforth, King, Beverley Callard, Stephanie Beacham, Michelle Collins, Sherrie Hewson, Amanda Barrie and Nadia Sawalha. One of Blake's musical ventures included reuniting the Nolans for a reunion tour. She met with 16 promoters who Blake said "laughed in her face" at the idea of a reunion tour for the group, but after the 17th promoter backed her idea for a tour, it was announced and quickly sold out. Within 24 hours of the tickets for the Nolans' tour going on sale, there was a recorded revenue of £2 million at the box office, and Blake was later awarded the Live Marketing of the Year award.

As well as representing the Nolans within music, she also represented member Coleen Nolan's television ventures, specifically her appearances on the ITV talk show Loose Women. Blake began representing more Loose Women panellists and at times, she represented the entire panel of the series. Blake was also responsible for the castings of many celebrities on reality competition programmes including Celebrity Big Brother, Dancing on Ice and Strictly Come Dancing. Blake then garnered a reputation as the "queen of soaps" due to her efforts at ensuring older actresses would get employed on soap operas. Some of her notable pitches include convincing EastEnders producers to rehire Taylforth and Danniella Westbrook following their initial departures. That of Taylforth's return involved Blake attempting to persuade producers for 15 years to rehire her, due to the writers having killed off Kathy Beale due to cast member Adam Woodyatt asking for a "juicy" storyline. Blake was also successful in pitching a return for King to return to Emmerdale as Kim Tate, the casting of Gaynor Faye as Megan Macey in Emmerdale and convincing Callard to return to Coronation Street as Liz McDonald, the landlady of the Rovers Return Inn.

=== 2017–present: Writing ventures ===
In 2017, Blake returned to journalism as the Sunday People's television critic, their first female columnist in over 30 years. She has also worked as a guest writer for the Daily Mirror, the Metro, the Daily Mail and the Irish Times. She later began a weekly column in Notebook magazine, the Sunday Mirror's magazine; the column later began receiving a publishing deal in New! magazine. In 2018, Blake made the decision to trim her client roster to focus on her writing career. Blake released her debut novel The Thunder Girls in 2018; the plot of the novel focused around a girl group who plan to reunite. Blake used her experiences within the music industry to inspire events of the novel. Blake had written the novel almost 20 years prior to its release, and at the age of 21, she was offered a publishing deal for the book on the condition that she amended the age of the characters to be younger and to make them posh. She declined the deal and the book went unpublished until 2018, with the characters' ages and background intact. In the first week of its release, The Thunder Girls sold over 4000 copies and became a number one bestseller on the Kindle Store for four consecutive weeks. The book also charted within the top 40 of the Amazon book chart, going on to sell 10,000 copies within its first month of release. It was noted that despite it being Blake's debut novel, it had sold more copies than numerous high-profile authors' books released that same week, including Maeve Binchy, Nadine Dorries and Lauren Weisberger. The success of the novel led to Blake adapting it into a live theatre production. The play debuted in 2019 at the Lowry Theatre and was later ordered for a national tour. The tour sold over a million tickets before being cancelled due to the impact of the COVID-19 pandemic on theatre.

In 2021, Blake released her second novel, Ruthless Women. Blake used experiences from the soap industry to inspire events of the book; she stated that what goes on behind the scenes of soap operas is sometimes not pretty and that she had "seen it all", which she wanted to represent in her writing. Blake revealed that prior to being published, the book was turned down by 39 publishing companies due to the focus of the book being on women over 50. The book became a Sunday Times bestseller and sold over 250,000 copies within its first month of release. Ruthless Women has since been translated into numerous international versions, with many of the releases topping their respective bookseller charts.

Blake was offered a deal to write a sequel to the Ruthless Women with the condition that she wrote the manuscript within 12 weeks, which she did. The sequel, Guilty Women, was released on 28 April 2022. After three days of sales, Guilty Women entered the Sunday Times Bestseller List. That same year, Blake turned down numerous offers to be a cast member within The Real Housewives franchises, including The Real Housewives of Cheshire and The Real Housewives of Jersey since she "doesn't crave fame". She subsequently announced that the final instalment of the trilogy, Vengeful Women, was set for release. After a dispute with HarperCollins, who published the first two books in the trilogy, Blake founded her own publishing company with the intention of publishing her own works including an autobiography, as well as other authors' novels. Vengeful Women was eventually released through Blake's company, Piranha Publishing, in 2025.

== Personal life ==
Blake was in a two-year on-off relationship with Michael Hutchence of INXS in the 1990s, describing him as "a man so devastatingly attractive that he could have made a nun break her chastity vows within minutes". Hutchence offered to pay off Blake's debts, who at the time was £50,000 in debt and living in a bedsit, but Blake refused. In one of her columns, Blake detailed how she was left at the altar after her fiancé of five years got cold feet on the day, as well as how he tried to reconcile their relationship years later, to which she turned down his advances.

== Bibliography ==
- The Thunder Girls (2018)
- Ruthless Women (2021)
- Guilty Women (2022)
- Vengeful Women (2025)
