= Spotless (TV series) =

2015 French TV series

- Genre: Dark comedy; Drama
- Created by: Ed McCardie; Corinne Marrinan
- Starring: Marc-André Grondin; Denis Ménochet; Miranda Raison; Brendan Coyle; Tanya Fear
- Composer: Neil Davidge
- Country of origin: France
- Original languages: English, French
- No. of seasons: 1
- No. of episodes: 10

Production
- Producers: Moritz Polter; Hugh Warren
- Cinematography: Giulio Biccari
- Running time: 60 minutes

Original release
- Network: Canal+
- Release: 16 March – 13 April 2015

Spotless is a French dark comedy-drama television series co-created by Ed McCardie and Corinne Marrinan, and produced by Tandem Communications (StudioCanal) in association with Rosetta Media. It premiered in France on Canal+ on 16 March 2015 and aired ten episodes until 13 April 2015. The series stars Marc-André Grondin, Denis Menochet, Miranda Raison, Brendan Coyle and Tanya Fear.

== Synopsis ==
In London, Jean Bastière has been leading a quiet family life with his wife and two children for fifteen years. Perfectly integrated, he manages a crime scene cleaning business.

The balance of the harmonious existence is disrupted, however, when the brother, Martin, whom he has not seen for years, reappears. With this bulky brother, the secrets and wounds of Jean's past resurface. Faced with old demons he had chosen to bury, Jean will also face other problems. When Martin arrives with the body of a woman hidden in his van, neither one suspects a year with serious consequences is about to start.

== Cast ==
- Marc-André Grondin as Jean Bastière
- Denis Ménochet as Martin Bastière
- Miranda Raison as Julie Greer-Bastière
- Doug Allen as Joey Samson
- Liam Garrigan as Victor Clay
- Ciarán Owens as Frank McElroy
- Kate Magowan as Sonny Clay
- Tanya Fear as Claire
- Naomi Radcliffe as Maureen Devine
- Lucy Akhurst as Nina Johnson
- Jemma Donovan as Maddy Bastière
- Niall Hayes as Olivier Bastière
- Brendan Coyle as Nelson Clay
- Izabella Urbanowicz as Rosie
- Tolga Safer as Hakan
- David Avery as Yilmaz

== Production ==
Spotless is an Anglo-French production. It was co-created by Ed McCardie and Corinne Marrinan, and was produced by Tandem Communications (StudioCanal) in association with Rosetta Media. The first series was shot at West London Film Studios. The series was renewed for a second season by the Esquire Network in April 2016, before Esquire Network became defunct in 2017.

== Broadcast ==
The series was aired by Esquire Network in the United States from November 2015 to January 2016. Internationally it was distributed by Netflix as a Netflix Original; it was later also carried by Netflix in the United States.

== Episodes ==
No.	Title	Directed by	Written by	Original release date
1	"One Hand Clapping"	Pascal Chaumeil	Ed McCardie	16 March 2015
A cleaner of crime scenes is pulled into London's criminal underworld by the actions of his irresponsible older brother.
2	"Carrot & Stick"	Pascal Chaumeil	Ed McCardie	16 March 2015
The brothers are forced into a dangerous partnership with Nelson Clay; Martin creates tension at home and in the neighborhood; Julie decides to take control of her future.
3	"Not a Place, a Circumstance"	Colin Teague	Ed McCardie	23 March 2015
Nelson reveals details of Jean's first clean-up job; Martin makes plans to leave London after learning that French gangsters are following him.
4	"Someone's Son, Somebody's Daughter"	Colin Teague	Lucy Catherine	23 March 2015
Nelson calls on Jean when a politician's drug-fueled night with an escort ends in tragedy; Maddy plays truant on the same day Julie opens her new business; Jean discovers a terrible secret about Victor.
5	"The Power of No"	China Moo-Young	Lucie Barat	30 March 2015
Jean takes a stand and refuses to do a requested clean, when Nelson pushes the boundaries too far. Fearing retaliation, Martin takes steps to protect them from Nelson, but ends up getting them into even deeper trouble.
6	"Fallowfield"	China Moo-Young	Chris Dunlop	30 March 2015
Martin's past catches up to him; Jean finds an ally in new Detective Chief Inspector Squire; Julie receives a commission from an unexpected client.
7	"Say What You See"	Luke Watson	Chris Dunlop	6 April 2015
Jean hopes that DCI Squire can help him break his partnership with Nelson; Martin begins an ill-advised affair; Julie investigates Jean's secrets.
8	"True Love Weighs"	Luke Watson	Simon Allen	6 April 2015
Jean uses his skills to help Maureen through a personal tragedy; Victor learns Martin's secret; Maddy is intrigued by an online friendship; Nelson plans to kill Jean in the woods.
9	"Rebound"	Phillip John	Marston Bloom	13 April 2015
Jean tries to return to normality and fix his family, but Julie has other plans. Meanwhile, Maddy's friendship with Steven leads her into big trouble; and Martin decides that Victor needs to die.
10	"To Victor, the Spoils"	Phillip John	Ed McCardie	13 April 2015
Jean and Martin set out to frame Victor, hoping that Nelson will kill him as a result. Meanwhile, Julie prepares to leave London; and Martin tells Jean a crucial piece of information about their father's death.
