= Nigel Green =

English actor (1924–1972)

- Born: Nigel McGown Green; 15 October 1924; Pretoria, Transvaal, Union of South Africa (now in Gauteng, South Africa)
- Died: 15 May 1972 (aged 47); Brighton, Sussex, England
- Education: University of London; Royal Academy of Dramatic Art
- Years active: 1952–1972
- Spouses: Patricia Marmont (m. 1952, divorced); Pamela Gordon (m. 1956)
- Children: 1 (with Gordon)
- Military career
- Allegiance: United Kingdom
- Branch: Royal Navy
- Unit: Fleet Air Arm
- Conflicts: World War II

Nigel McGown Green (15 October 1924 – 15 May 1972) was a South African-born English actor. His strapping build, commanding height (1.93 m or 6 ft 4 in) and regimental demeanour often found playing military types and men of action in such classic 1960s films as Jason and the Argonauts, Zulu, Tobruk and The Ipcress File.

== Early life and education ==
Nigel Green was born in Pretoria, South Africa to British parents. He was the son of Scottish pioneering animal health biochemist Henry Hamilton Green, DSc, and Katherine Laura, née McGown, daughter of printer John McGown. In Pretoria, his father was employed as professor of biochemistry and sub-director of the Veterinary Research Laboratories at Onderstepoort (he was later a researcher at New Haw in Surrey, having been director of the Scottish Dairy Research Institute). Green's elder brother, Kenneth Gillies Green (1918–1990), was a physician, an adviser to companies including Imperial Chemical Industries, and in 1959 a founder of the Association of Medical Advisers in the Pharmaceutical Industry, now the British Association for Pharmaceutical Physicians.

Green was subsequently raised in London, attending King's College School, Wimbledon and the University of London, followed by the Royal Academy of Dramatic Art. During the Second World War he trained as an Observer in the Royal Navy's Fleet Air Arm.

== Career ==
=== Stage ===
Among early stage appearances, Green was at London's New Theatre (now the Noël Coward Theatre) in October 1948, playing multiple roles in John Burrell's Old Vic company revival of The Tragical History of Doctor Faustus. At the Stratford Memorial Theatre in 1950, he was cast as Sir Thomas Lovell in Henry VIII (directed by Tyrone Guthrie), Abhorson in Peter Brook's production of Measure for Measure (which also toured Germany), Decius Brutus in Julius Caesar (directed by Anthony Quayle), and — most notably — Edmund in King Lear, starring and co-directed by John Gielgud.

Green's subsequent West End appearances included Come Live With Me (directed by Roy Rich: Vaudeville Theatre, June 1951), Heloise (directed by Michael Powell: Duke of York's Theatre, November 1951), Vernon Sylvaine's As Long as They're Happy, opposite Jack Buchanan (directed by Roy Rich: Garrick Theatre, July 1953), Félicien Marceau's The Egg (directed by Charles Frank: Saville Theatre, October 1957) and Agatha Christie's Go Back for Murder (directed by Hubert Gregg: Duchess Theatre, March 1960).

In his second volume of autobiography, Michael Powell pointed out that, though the play they collaborated on was a failure, "Nigel Green, with his great face and towering figure, would soon make a name for himself in movies. Who could ever forget him in Zulu? He was an almost mythical figure, like Harry Andrews and Victor McLaglen, and later John Wayne, all of them genuine and generous artists. Among other men, they were like Norse gods, mythical, large and gentle, suddenly exploding into rage and performing fabulous feats of strength."

=== Screen ===
Green's early film roles included Reach for the Sky (1956), The Criminal (1960), The League of Gentlemen (1960) and Beat Girl (1960). His imposing physique led to his being cast as Little John in the film Sword of Sherwood Forest (1960).

Green had one of his most memorable roles as Hercules in Jason and the Argonauts (1963), followed by his co-starring role as Colour Sergeant Frank Bourne in Zulu (1964). He had a leading role as Inspector Sir Denis Nayland Smith in The Face of Fu Manchu (1965) and the supporting role of Major Dalby in The Ipcress File (also 1965). Other roles include Carl Petersen in the Bulldog Drummond film Deadlier Than the Male (1967), as McCune, a devious Australian in the 1967 comedy-adventure The Pink Jungle, Count Contini in the Matt Helm film The Wrecking Crew (1968), and 'Lord Ashley's Whore' in John Huston's The Kremlin Letter (1969). His many military roles included parts in Khartoum (1966), Tobruk (1967), Fräulein Doktor and Play Dirty (both 1969).

Green also appeared in several horror films, including Corridors of Blood (1958), The Masque of the Red Death (1964), The Skull (1965), Let's Kill Uncle (1966) and Countess Dracula (1971). His penultimate role was as McKyle the 'Electric Messiah', a mental patient believing himself to be God, in The Ruling Class (1972).

Green's television appearances included The Adventures of Sir Lancelot, The Adventures of William Tell, The Other Man, Danger Man, The Power Game, The Avengers, Sherlock Holmes, Jason King, The Protectors and The Persuaders!.

== Personal life ==
Green's first wife was actress Patricia Marmont. His second wife was actress Pamela Gordon, with whom he had one daughter.

=== Death ===
Green died following an overdose of sleeping pills in 1972, aged 47. It is unknown if his death was intentional. Peter O'Toole said in his audio commentary for The Ruling Class that he believed Green was very depressed and that his death was a suicide, although Green's family believed it to be accidental. He was separated from his wife Pamela Gordon at the time.

== Filmography ==
=== Film ===
| Year | Title | Role | Notes |
|---|---|---|---|
| 1942 | This Was Paris | German Infiltrator | Uncredited |
| 1954 | Meet Mr. Malcolm | Sgt Bassett | |
| 1954 | Stranger from Venus | Second Police Officer | |
| 1954 | The Sea Shall Not Have Them | Met Officer Howard | |
| 1955 | As Long as They're Happy | Peter Pember | |
| 1956 | Reach for the Sky | Streatfield | |
| 1956 | Find the Lady | Photographer | Uncredited |
| 1957 | Bitter Victory | Private Wilkins | |
| 1958 | The Gypsy and the Gentleman | Game Pup | |
| 1958 | Corridors of Blood | Inspector Donovan | |
| 1959 | Witness in the Dark | The Intruder | |
| 1960 | League of Gentlemen | Kissing man in truck | Uncredited |
| 1960 | Beat Girl | Simon | |
| 1960 | Sword of Sherwood Forest | Little John | |
| 1960 | The Criminal | Ted | |
| 1961 | Gorgo | Bulletin Announcer | Uncredited |
| 1961 | Pit of Darkness | Jonathan | |
| 1961 | The Queen's Guards | Abu Sibdar | |
| 1962 | The Spanish Sword | Baron Breaute | |
| 1962 | The Durant Affair | Sir Patrick | |
| 1963 | Mystery Submarine | Chief ERA Lovejoy | |
| 1963 | Jason and the Argonauts | Hercules | |
| 1963 | The Man Who Finally Died | Sergeant Hirsch | |
| 1964 | Zulu | Colour Sergeant Frank Bourne | |
| 1964 | Saturday Night Out | Paddy | |
| 1964 | The Masque of the Red Death | Ludovico | |
| 1965 | The Ipcress File | Major Dalby | |
| 1965 | The Face of Fu Manchu | Denis Nayland Smith | |
| 1965 | The Skull | Inspector Wilson | |
| 1966 | Khartoum | General Garnet Wolseley, 1st Viscount Wolseley | |
| 1966 | Let's Kill Uncle | Major Kevin Harrison | |
| 1967 | Tobruk | Lieutenant-Colonel John Harker | |
| 1967 | Deadlier Than the Male | Carl Petersen | |
| 1967 | The Queen's Traitor | John Hawkins | |
| 1967 | Africa Texas Style | Karl Bekker | |
| 1968 | The Pink Jungle | Crowley | |
| 1968 | The Wrecking Crew | Count Massimo Contini | |
| 1969 | Play Dirty | Colonel Masters | |
| 1969 | Fräulein Doktor | Colonel Mathesius | |
| 1970 | The Kremlin Letter | 'The Whore' | |
| 1971 | Countess Dracula | Captain Dobi | |
| 1972 | The Ruling Class | McKyle | Posthumous release |
| 1973 | Gawain and the Green Knight | Green Knight | Posthumous release |

=== Television ===
| Year | Title | Role | Notes |
|---|---|---|---|
| 1952 | Suspense | Mr Williams | Episode: "Monsieur Vidocq" |
| 1953 | Broadway Television Theatre | Prince Sirki of Vitalba Alexa | Episode: "Death Takes a Holiday" |
| 1956 | The Adventure of Robin Hood | Prival | Episode: "The Imposters" |
| 1956–57 | The Adventures of Sir Launcelot | Various | 8 episodes |
| 1958 | Ivanhoe | Timon | Episode: "Counterfeit" |
| 1958–59 | The Adventures of William Tell | Fertog (The Bear) | 8 episodes |
| 1959 | Armchair Theatre | Stranger | Episode: "The Devil's Instrument" |
| 1959 | The Flying Doctor | Haggerty | Episode: "A Circle in the Bush" |
| 1959 | World Theatre | Recruiting Officer | Episode: "Mother Courage and Her Children" |
| 1959 | BBC Sunday Night Theatre | Freddie Henderson | Episode: "The Velvet Alley" |
| 1959 | International Detective | Montoro | 4 episodes |
| 1961 | Danger Man | Colonel Heinrich Wetzel | Episode: "The Girl Who Liked G.I.s" |
| 1961–62 | The Edgar Wallace Mystery Theater | Lew Daney/Ralph Monk | 2 episodes |
| 1962 | The Magical World of Disney | The Ruffler | 3 episodes |
| 1962 | Ghost Squad | Cresswell | Episode: "The Missing People" |
| 1962 | Harpers West One | Marinus Van Leut | 1 episode |
| 1962 | The Benny Hill Show | Silas | Episode: "The Mystery of Black Bog Manor" |
| 1962, 1967 | Drama 61-67 | Jamieson | 2 episodes |
| 1963 | Alcoa Premiere | Brown | Episode: "Hornblower" |
| 1963 | 24-Hour Call | Inspector Jago | Episode: "Never Leave Me" |
| 1963 | Zero One | Saunders | Episode: "Delayed Reaction" |
| 1963 | Richard the Lionheart | Hermit/Nicholas | 2 episodes |
| 1963–64 | Love Story | Charles Dent/Walter Gullett | 2 episodes |
| 1964 | ITV Sunday Night Drama | Sam | Episode: "Sunday Mystery Theatre: The Primitives" |
| 1964 | ITV Play of the Week | CSM Blackman | Episode: "The Other Man" |
| 1964 | Theatre 625 | Tim Afton | Episode: "Women in Crisis #2: With Love and Tears" |
| 1965 | No Hiding Place | Georgie Dyson | Episode: "Whoever's Right, Sweeney's Wrong" |
| 1966 | The Plane Makers | Hartley | Episode: "Point of Balance" |
| 1967 | The Queen's Traitor | John Hawkins | 5 episodes |
| 1967, 1969 | The Avengers | Sir Lexius Cray/Sir Geoffrey Armstrong | 2 episodes |
| 1968 | Thirty-Minute Theatre | Colonel Willowby | Episode: "A Question of Honour" |
| 1968 | Sherlock Holmes | Sir Robert Norberton | Episode: "Shoscombe Old Place" |
| 1970 | Dr. Finlay's Casebook | Hamil | Episode: "Responsibilities" |
| 1971 | Jason King | Charles | Episode: "As Easy as ABC" |
| 1972 | The Persuaders! | John Cavendish | Episode: "Read and Destroy" |
| 1972 | Clochemerle | Captain Tardivaux | 3 episodes |
| 1972 | The Protectors | Krassinkov | Episode: "Balance of Terror"; posthumous release |

== See also ==
- List of unsolved deaths

== Sources ==
- Sheldon Hall (2014). "Green, Nigel McGown (1924–1972)". Oxford Dictionary of National Biography. Oxford University Press. doi:10.1093/ref:odnb/94147. ISBN 9780198614111.
- David McGillivray (1988). "Now you know". Films and Filming. 34 (April 1988). London: 47. ISSN 0015-167X.
- Terence Pettigrew (1982). British Character Actors (Rowman & Littlefield).
