= Chocolate Puma =

DJ and music production duo

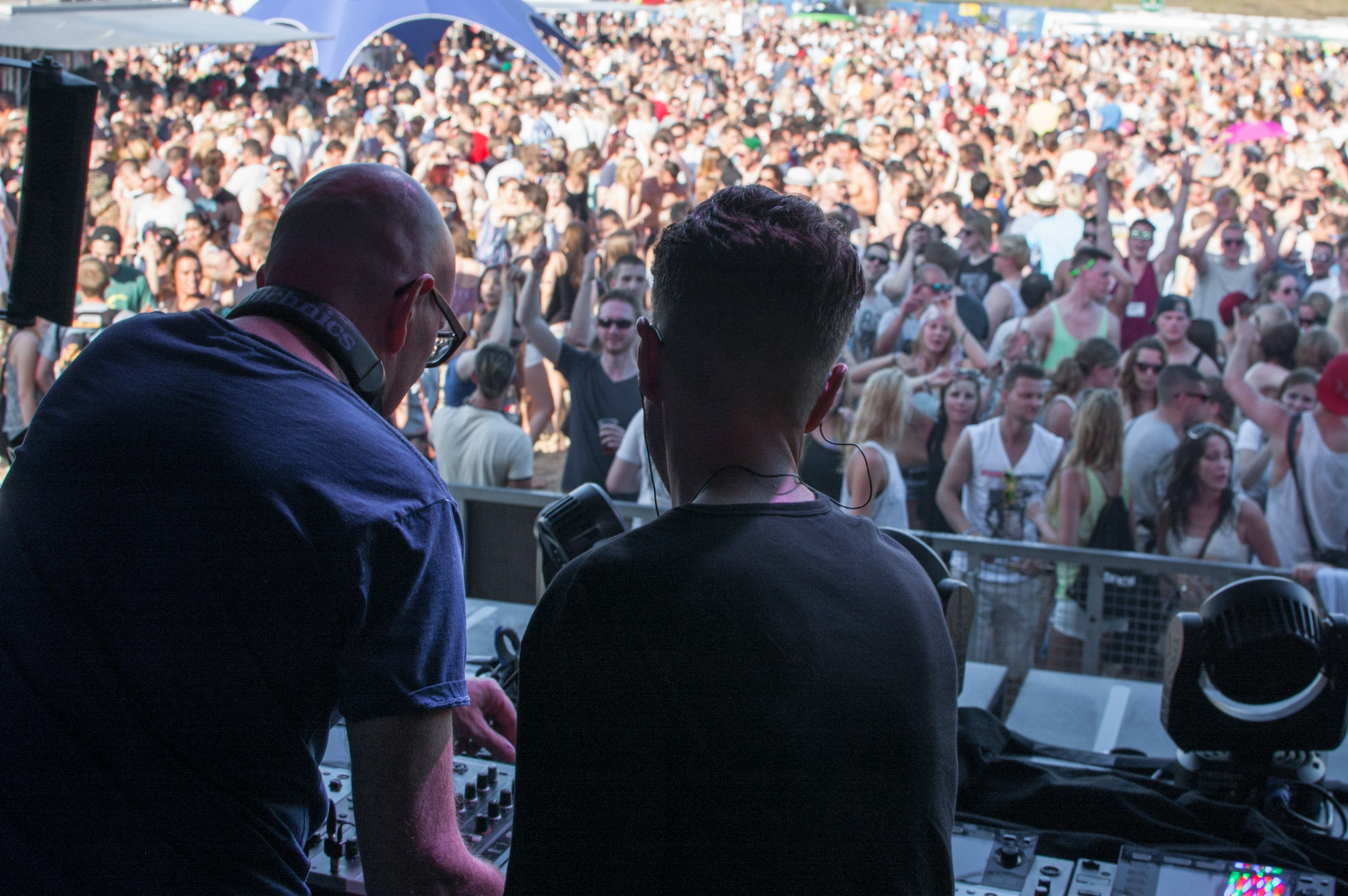
- Chocolate Puma performing at the Sony Stage of the Oldenbora 2014

Background information
- Also known as: The Good Men (or The Goodmen); Zki & Dobre; Klatsch! Rhythm Killaz; Tomba Vira; Riva; Jark Prongo; F-Action; René et Gaston; DJ Manta
- Origin: Haarlem, North Holland, Netherlands
- Genres: House, dance, electronic
- Years active: 1991–present
- Labels: Fresh Fruit; Hooj Choons; Parlophone; Incentive Records; VC Recordings; Spinnin' Records; Mixmash Records; Spinnin' Deep; Dim Mak
- Members: Gaston Steenskist ("Dobre"); René ter Horst ("DJ Zki")

Chocolate Puma are a DJ and music production duo from Haarlem, North Holland, consisting of René ter Horst ("DJ Zki") and Gaston Steenkist ("Dobre"). Their stage names include "Zki & Dobre", "The Good Men", and "Riva".

Zki & Dobre have produced dance music under various group names since the early 1990s. Their most notable productions are "Give It Up" (1993) credited to The Good Men, "I Wanna Be U" (2001) credited to Chocolate Puma, and "Who Do You Love Now?" (2001) credited to Riva, and featuring Dannii Minogue. They also founded their own record label, Pssst Music.

== Musical career ==
As the Goodmen, their most notable production was "Give It Up", a 1993 house music track based upon samba-styled percussion and the simple, repeating vocal line of the song title. The percussion was inspired by a Sérgio Mendes recording.

The song rose to #1 on the US Billboard Hot Dance Club Play chart in 1993 and made a brief appearance on the US Billboard Hot 100 chart, peaking at #71. When re-released in late 1993, "Give It Up" reached #5 on the UK Singles Chart.

== Various monikers ==
Horst and Steenkist are also known under many aliases including:

- The Good Men (alternatively The Goodmen) with a string of hits that started with the hit "Give It Up" in 1993 making it to number 5 on the UK Singles Charts, number 1 on the US Dance charts and number 71 in the US Hot 100. The follow-up "Damn Woman" charted in the Dutch charts in 1994. The Good Men also released the 1994 album Father in the Bathroom.
- René Et Gaston (based on their given names René ter Horst and Gaston Steenskist) with the hit "Vallée de larmes" in 1993
- Klatsch! (with the hits "Oh Boy" in 1993 and "God Save the Queer" in 1994
- F-Action, a musical project in cooperation with Ramon Zenker from Hardfloor, the best known hit being "Let's Get Closer Baby".

They also created JP Records and psst Records and finally Groove Alert founded by Dobre.

In the late 1990s and early 2000s, they appeared in a new set of projects and monikers

- Basco, a Big Beat musical project resulting in the album High Involvement
- Jark Prongo, with success in the UK in 1999 with "Movin' Thru Your System" accompanied by a similar titled 14-track album released on March 22, 1999 on Pssst Music. The releases stretched from 1999 to 2004. Locally in the Netherlands, Jark Prongo had success with the single "Sweet Little Thing". Most materials of this period including additional EPs Shake It, Rattlesnake and No Api were released on Pssst Music and Hooj Choons.
- Tomba Vira, a project from 2000 to 2002 that started with the EP Down the Park, the hits "Shriek" in 2000, "The Sound of: Oh Yeah" (based on a sample of OMD's "Enola Gay) in 2001, followed by "Dynamite" in 2002
- Rhythm Killaz, an electronic formation created mainly for the release of the March 2001 hit single/EP "Wack Ass MF"

Their best known monikers besides the early years' The Goodmen were Riva and Chocolate Puma:

- Riva, was a name best known for the international hit "Who Do You Love Now?". Originally a Dutch local music hit "Stringer uit", it was adapted into a vocal version for Dannii Minogue at the height of her sister Kylie Minogue who was having a massive hit with "Can't Get You Out of My Head". Riva's "Who Do You Love Now?" went on to reach number 3 on the UK Singles Chart in 2001. An EP Who Do You Love Now? was also released in November 2001 through Alien/United Recordings, exclusively licensed to London Records 90 Ltd. The EP contained 9 various remixes of the song featuring Dannii Minogue.
- Chocolate Puma, thus far the moniker used more consistently by the duo particularly after the hit "I Wanna Be U", yet another big UK hit for them in 2001 that made it to UK Singles Chart' peaking at number 6. 2008 was a very active year with the release of "Always and Forever" that was a hit in the Netherlands, Belgium, France and many European night venues. Also in 2008 came cooperation with the Bingo Players (Maarten Hoogstraten and Paul Bäumer) in two releases being "Disco Electrique" and "Touch Me".

== In popular culture ==
In 1994, Gaston Steenkist (Dobre), one half of the duo Zki & Dobre was instrumental in discovering Filipino-Dutch DJ Laidback Luke after the latter forwarded a demo tape to him. Laidback Luke was signed to a recording contract by the management of Dobre. By the end of the year, he released two albums on the label Groove Alert newly established by Dobre. Laidback Luke went on to have a prosperous DJ and producing career.

In 1995, Simply Red sampled The Good Men's hit "Give It Up" for their UK #1 hit "Fairground". The Good Men were credited for the sample, and Mendes was also given credit as the performer of "Fanfarra", the original source of the Goodmen's track.

The duo's work has been featured on many DJ mixes from Hooj Choons, Global Underground, and Ministry of Sound.

== Discography ==
=== As The Good Men ===
==== Studio albums ====
Year	Album
1994	Father in the Bathroom

==== Singles ====
Year	Single	Peak chart positions								Album
Year	Single	NLD	AUS	BEL	GER	SWI	UK	US	US Dance	Album
1993	"Give It Up"	6	65	18	17	33	5	71	1	Father in the Bathroom
1994	"Damn Woman"	36	—	—	—	—	—	—	—	Father in the Bathroom
1995	"Huh!"	—	—	—	—	—	—	—	—	Father in the Bathroom
"—" denotes releases that did not chart

=== As Chocolate Puma ===
==== Extended plays ====
Title	Details
Get Out of the Way / Wan Tu (with Wiwek)	Released: 21 May 2018; Label: Spinnin' Records; Format: Digital download
Make 'M Bounce / Put It Down	Released: 30 July 2018; Label: Spinnin' Records; Format: Digital download

==== Singles ====
Year	Single	Label	Peak chart positions			
Year	Single	Label	NLD	BEL	FRA	UK
2001	"I Wanna Be U"	Cream Records	65	—	—	6
2003	"A Star Is Born"	Pssst Music	—	—	—	—
2005	"4 Letter Word"	Pssst Music	—	—	—	—
2006	"Always and Forever"	Pssst Music	33	56	50	43
2008	"Touch Me" (vs. Bingo Players)	Strictly Rhythm	73	—	—	76
2009	"Disco Electrique" (vs. Bingo Players)	Strictly Rhythm	—	—	—	—
2011	"Go Bang!" (with Firebeatz)	Pssst Music	—	—	—	—
2012	"Gimme Sum" (with Gregor Salto)	Pssst Music	—	—	—	—
2012	"Just One More Time Baby" (with Firebeatz)	Spinnin' Records	—	—	—	—
2013	"2000 People"	Mixmash Records	—	—	—	—
2013	"Sausage Fest" (with Firebeatz)	Spinnin' Records	—	—	—	—
2014	"Step Back" (featuring Kris Kiss)	Mixmash Records	48	83	—	—
2014	"Rubberband Lazer" (featuring Maikal X)	Dim Mak Records	—	—	—	—
2014	"I Can't Understand" (with Firebeatz)	Spinnin' Records	—	116	—	—
2015	"Chicago Disco" (with Tommie Sunshine)	Size Records	—	—	—	—
2015	"Lost Your Groove" (with Junior Sanchez featuring Arama)	Dim Mak Records	—	—	—	—
2015	"I Could Be Wrong"	Spinnin' Records	—	—	—	—
2015	"Snap That Neck" (with Laidback Luke)	Mixmash Records	—	—	—	—
2015	"The Max" (featuring Kris Kiss)	Dim Mak Records	—	—	—	—
2015	"Scrub the Ground" (with Tommie Sunshine featuring DJ Funk)	Heldeep / Spinnin' Records	—	—	—	—
2015	"Popatron"	Spinnin' Deep	—	—	—	—
2015	"Jegog"	Spinnin' Premium	—	—	—	—
2016	"Listen To The Talk"	Spinnin' Records	—	—	—	—
2016	"Lullaby" (with Firebeatz featuring Bishøp)	Spinnin' Records	—	—	—	—
2016	"Space Sheep" (with Oliver Heldens)	Heldeep Records	—	—	—	—
2016	"Raise Your Hands Up" (with Sander van Doorn)	Musical Freedom / Spinnin' Records	—	—	—	—
2016	"Steam Train" (with Hi-Lo)	Heldeep / Spinnin' Records	—	—	—	—
2016	"Take The Ride" (with Tommie Sunshine)	Heldeep / Spinnin' Records	—	—	—	—
2017	"The Stars Are Mine" (with Pep & Rash)	Spinnin' Deep	—	—	—	—
2017	"Rising Up" (with Bart B More)	Spinnin' Deep	—	—	—	—
2017	"Hippo" (with Moksi)	Heldeep / Spinnin'Records	—	—	—	—
2018	"Gotta Get Away" (featuring Chateau)	Spinnin' Records	—	—	—	—
2018	"Tear This Mother Down" (with Tommie Sunshine featuring MX2)	Heldeep / Spinnin' Records	—	—	—	—
2018	"Bump" (with Cartac featuring Kris Kiss)	Spinnin' Records	—	—	—	—
2018	"Blackout" (with Firebeatz)	Musical Freedom / Spinnin' Records	—	—	—	—
2018	"Together Forever" (with Pep & Rash)	Spinnin' Records	—	—	—	—
2019	"The Same Way"	Spinnin' Records	—	—	—	—
2019	"Zhong" (with Carta)	Axtone	—	—	—	—
2019	"Lazerx999" (with Hi-Lo)	Heldeep Records	—	—	—	—
2019	"Blam!" (with Antranig)	Spinnin' Records	—	—	—	—
2020	"Soul Fifty" (with Firebeatz)	Spinnin' Records	—	—	—	—
2020	"Megablast"	Tonco Tone	—	—	—	—
2020	"You Are My Life" (with Mike Cervello)	Axtone	—	—	—	—
2020	"Me Up" (featuring Chateau)	Spinnin' Records	—	—	—	—
2020	"Rebels on the Run" (featuring Grace Tither)	Spinnin' Records	—	—	—	—
"—" denotes a recording that did not chart or was not released.

==== Remixes and edits ====
Year	Track	Artist	Label	Album
2010	"Umbungo (Chocolate Puma Remix)"	The BeatThiefs	Big & Dirty	
2013	"In Da Jungle (Chocolate Puma Remix)"	Orlando Voorn	Big & Dirty	
2013	"Atmosphere (Chocolate Puma Remix)"	Kaskade	Ultra	
2014	"Bassline (Chocolate Puma Remix)"	GotSome featuring The Get Along Gang	Defected Records	
2014	"Revolution (Chocolate Puma Remix)"	R3hab & NERVO & Ummet Ozcan	SPRS	
2015	"Treasured Soul (Chocolate Puma Remix)"	Michael Calfan	Spinnin' Remixes	
2015	"Eclipse (Chocolate Puma Remix)"	Hardwell	Revealed Recordings	United We Are Remixed
2016	"Selecta (Chocolate Puma Edit)"	Kryder	Spinnin' Records	
2016	"Lullaby (Chocolate Puma Balearic House Mix)"	Firebeatz & Chocolate Puma featuring Bishøp	Spinnin' Remixes	
2016	"Trouble (Chocolate Puma Remix)"	offaiah	Virgin EMI Records	
2017	"Where U Iz (Chocolate Puma Remix)"	Fatboy Slim	Southern Fried Records	
2017	"Yeah Yeah (Chocolate Puma Remix)"	Bodyrox	Spinnin' Records	
2017	"Ibiza 77 (Can You Feel It) (Chocolate Puma Remix)"	Oliver Heldens	Heldeep Records	
2019	"Step Back (VIP Mix)"	Chocolate Puma featuring Kris Kris	Mixmash Records	
2020	"Badam (Chocolate Puma Remix)"	Hardwell and Henry Fong featuring Mr. Vegas	Revealed Recordings	Revealed 10 Year Anniversary: Remixed EP 01

=== Under other aliases ===
==== Singles ====
Year	Single	Credited to	Peak chart positions			Album
Year	Single	Credited to	NLD	BEL	UK	Album
1993	"Oh Boy"	Klatsch!	25	—	—	Non-album singles
1993	"Vallée de larmes"	René et Gaston	41	—	—	Non-album singles
1994	"God Save the Queer"	Klatsch!	42	—	—	Non-album singles
1995	"Let's Get Closer Baby"	F-Action	—	—	—	Non-album singles
1999	"Movin' Thru Your System"	Jark Prongo	—	—	58	Non-album singles
2001	"Sweet Little Thing"	Jark Prongo	87	—	—	Non-album singles
2001	"Wack Ass MF"	Rhythm Killaz	—	—	32	Non-album singles
2001	"The Sound of: Oh Yeah"	Tomba Vira	—	—	51	Non-album singles
2001	"Who Do You Love Now?" (Riva featuring Dannii Minogue)	Riva	26	10	3	Non-album singles
"—" denotes releases that did not chart
