= Give It Up (The Good Men song) =

1993 single by the Good Men

- Maxi single cover

Single by the Good Men
- Released: 26 July 1993 (UK)
- Length: 3:27 (radio edit)
- Label: Fresh Fruit; Ffrreedom
- Songwriter: The Goodmen
- Producer: The Goodmen

The Good Men singles chronology
"Give It Up" (1993)	"Damn Woman" (1994)

Alternative cover
- Alternative cover crediting the Goodmen

Music video
- "Give It Up" on YouTube

"Give It Up" is a song by Dutch musical duo Chocolate Puma performing under the name "the Good Men", or alternatively, "the Goodmen". It samples "Fanfarra (Cabua-Le-Le)" and "Magalenha" by Sérgio Mendes and "I Need You Now" by Sinnamon. Released as Chocolate Puma's debut single on 26 July 1993 in the United Kingdom, the song became a chart hit in 1993, peaking atop the American and Canadian dance charts and reaching the top 10 in several European nations. In 1995, Simply Red sampled "Give It Up" for their UK number-one hit "Fairground".

== Critical reception ==
Larry Flick from Billboard magazine wrote, "The import buzz on this one has been positively deafening. Mostly instrumental track is a curious but pleasing mixture of African rhythms and high school drill-team drumming." He added, "Cushiony synth pads provide a slight ambience that will add drama to just about any dance floor. Fun and quirky track has all the elements and cool sound effects needed for a radio edit that would be juicy for top 40 and crossover formats." Music writer and columnist James Masterton said, "One of the quirkier dance records around at the moment, for the first minute or so consisting of nothing more than a synthesised drum beat, makes a good climb this week and given the right amount of exposure may well progress into the 20 next week."

Maria Jimenez from Music & Media named it an "percussive masterpiece". Andy Beevers from Music Week noted, "Originally out on Fresh Fruit, this top tune is already an underground favourite, mainly because of its mad carnival-style percussion intro and attention-grabbing vocal samples. It now has major label backing and is destined for bigger things." In his weekly dance column, James Hamilton from the Record Mirror Dance Update described it as a "snare drums tapped then Brazilian, Oriental and other rhythms driven fantastically powerful 124.7bpm surging percussive leaper".

== Chart performance ==
Commercially, "Give It Up" reached number one on the US Billboard Hot Dance Club Play chart in 1993 and made a brief appearance on the Billboard Hot 100, peaking at number 71. After being re-released in late 1993, it reached number five on the UK Singles Chart. The song also reached the top 10 in Finland, Ireland and the Netherlands.

== Impact and legacy ==
American DJ, record producer, remixer and songwriter Armand van Helden named "Give It Up" one of his "classic cuts" in 1995, adding, "Out of the more recent stuff, The Goodmen is the only track that hits you right in your face. There's nothing like it, nothing even comes close. When it came out it was destined to be a classic. In America it hit big and to this day – and it came out in '93 – it's still played out. Still records are coming out with The Goodmen sound and there will be records with that sound for the next 10 years – that's how you know it's a classic. When The Goodmen came out in America there was no record close when it was hot – people would go to clubs and wait for it to come on."

== Track listings ==
- CD-maxi – Fresh Fruit Records
1. "Give It Up" (radio edit) – 3:27
2. "Give It Up" (Batacuda Refrescante) – 6:57
3. "Land of Haze" – 7:28
- 1993 CD-maxi Blow Up – Intercord Records
1. "Give It Up" (radio edit) – 3:29
2. "Give It Up" (Batacuda Refrescante) – 6:47
3. "Land of Haze" – 7:30
4. "Blue Nuts" – 5:52

== Charts ==
=== Weekly charts ===
Chart (1993–1994)	Peak position
Australia (ARIA)	65
Belgium (Ultratop 50 Flanders)	18
Canada Dance/Urban (RPM)	1
Europe (Eurochart Hot 100)	9
Europe (European Dance Radio)	4
Finland (Suomen virallinen lista)	2
Germany (GfK)	17
Greece (Pop + Rock)	1
Ireland (IRMA)	3
Netherlands (Dutch Top 40)	6
Netherlands (Single Top 100)	6
Portugal (AFP)	6
Switzerland (Schweizer Hitparade)	33
UK Singles (Official Charts)	5
UK Airplay (ERA)	52
UK Dance (Music Week)	1
UK Club Chart (Music Week)	4
US Billboard Hot 100	71
US Dance Club Play (Billboard)	1
US Maxi-Singles Sales (Billboard)	2
US Cash Box Top 100	84

=== Year-end charts ===
Chart (1993)	Position
Belgium (Ultratop)	97
Europe (Eurochart Hot 100)	74
Germany (Media Control)	77
Netherlands (Dutch Top 40)	34
Netherlands (Single Top 100)	25
UK Singles (OCC)	32
UK Club Chart (Music Week)	71
US Dance Club Play (Billboard)	48
US Maxi-Singles Sales (Billboard)	38

Chart (1994)	Position
Canada Dance/Urban (RPM)	31
US Maxi-Singles Sales (Billboard)	19

== Certifications ==
Region	Certification	Certified units/sales
United Kingdom (BPI)	Silver	200,000^{^}
^{^} Shipments figures based on certification alone.
