= Tanya Fear =

British actress (born 1989)

Tanyaradzwa Fear
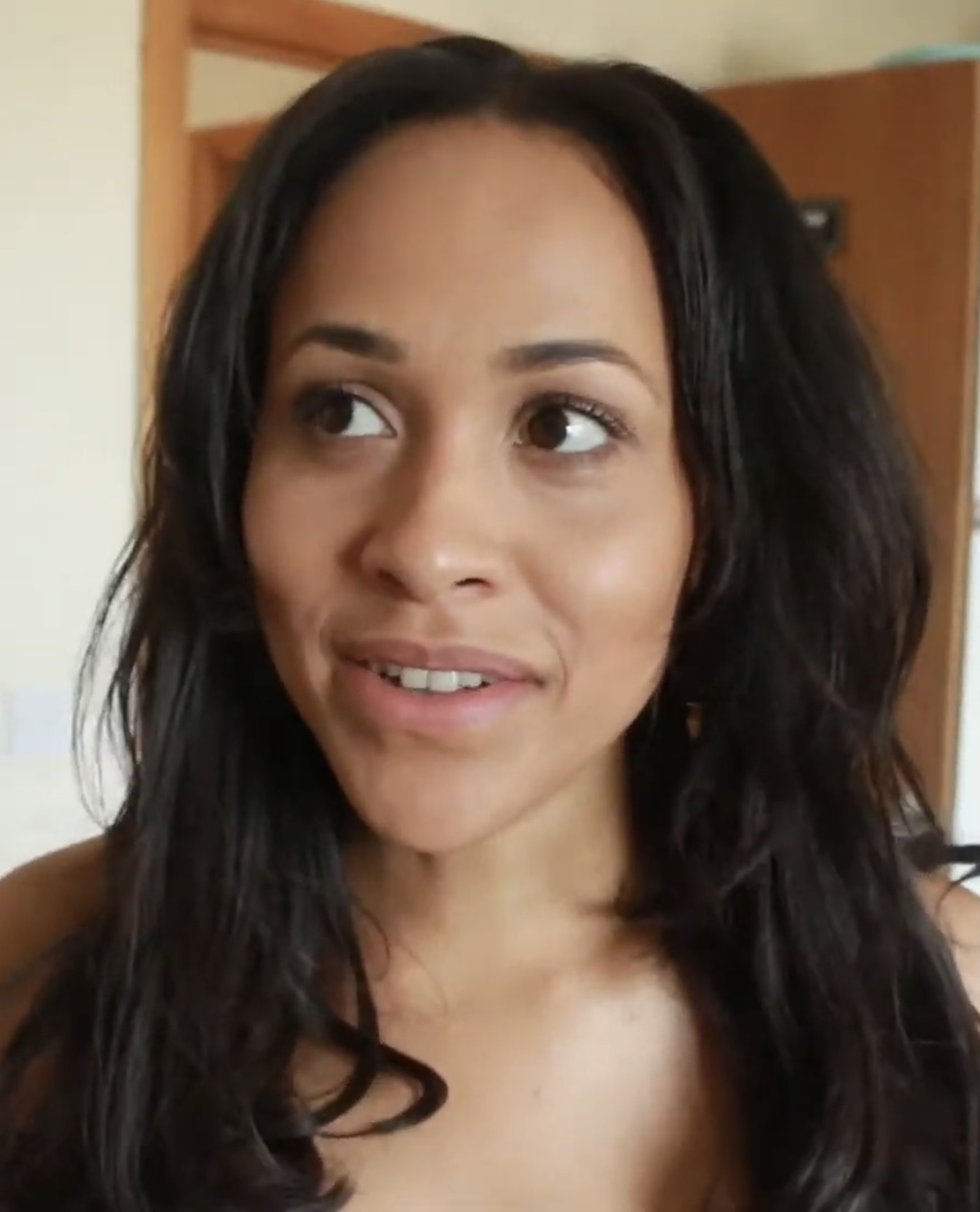
- Fear in 2018
- Born: Pauline Tanyaradzwa Adele Fear; 1989 or 1990 (age 36–37); London, England
- Other names: Tanya Fear (professionally to 2021), Pauline Fear
- Occupation: Actress
- Years active: 2010–2022

Pauline Tanyaradzwa Adele "Tanya" Fear (born 1989 or 1990) is a British actress and comedian. She had a recurring role on the 2015 television series Spotless and appeared in the Doctor Who episode "Arachnids in the UK" in 2018. In 2021 she announced that she would use the name Tanyaradzwa Fear professionally, having previously been credited as Tanya Fear.

Fear announced in August 2022 that she was leaving the film and television industry.

== Early life ==
Fear was born in London, UK. Her father, Andrew Stephen Fear, is English while her mother, Yvonne Zolisa Marimo, was born in Zimbabwe. Fear used the name Tanya from an early age, a shortened form of her name Tanyaradzwa, which means "we have been comforted" in her mother's native Shona language.

While pursuing a degree in Comparative Literature at King's College London, Fear made the decision to pursue her dream of acting, moving to Los Angeles in 2009 for a few months. She then trained at Identity School of Acting back in London.

== Career ==
Fear's first screen work was in the original 2010 television pilot for the British series The Fades; the pilot was unaired, but did lead to the series being picked up by BBC, with a different cast. She appeared in the 2013 movie Kick-Ass 2, as well as television series including Some Girls (2013), DCI Banks (2015), and Doctor Who (2018). In 2020, working with the precautions implemented during the COVID-19 pandemic in California, Fear wrote, directed and appeared in a series of three romantic comedy short films examining love during the pandemic: Shoot Your Shot, Shoot Your Shot 2: An International Affair, and Shoot Your Shot 3: The Wedding.

== Awards and accolades ==
In 2019, BAFTA Los Angeles name Fear on its list of 25 Rising Stars.

== Personal life ==
In April 2021, Fear announced that she had chosen to follow the lead of fellow actress Thandie Newton, also of mixed Zimbabwean-British descent, who had announced a few days earlier that she would use the full spelling of her Zimbabwean given name professionally, subsequently being credited as Thandiwe Newton. Fear will now use the full spelling of her birth name in the name she uses professionally, subsequently being credited as Tanyaradzwa Fear.

On 9 September 2021, Fear's UK-based family reported to the Los Angeles Police Department (LAPD) that Fear was missing from her Hollywood Bowl area apartment. The family reached out to American and British media, which reported the story early on 13 September. The family's own social media efforts resulted in a possible sighting at a Los Angeles grocery store at a nearby location on Santa Monica Boulevard on 12 September; the LAPD reported that Fear was found safe in the afternoon of 13 September, with one news outlet stating that she was receiving undisclosed treatment in a local hospital.

== Filmography ==
Film
Year	Title	Role	Notes
2013	Kick-Ass 2	Harlow	feature film
2023	Nessie	Heather	feature film

Television
Year	Title	Role	Notes
2010	The Fades	Jay	Unaired Pilot
2012	The Midnight Beast	Sam	1 episode: "Someone Called Sam"
2013	Some Girls	Morgan	1 episode
2014	Boomers	Anna	1 episode
2015	DCI Banks	Melanie Thomas	2 episodes
2015	Spotless	Claire Wiseman	series regular
2015	Midsomer Murders	Orla Campbell	1 episode: "The Incident at Cooper Hill"
2018	Doctor Who	Dr. Jade McIntyre	1 episode: "Arachnids in the UK"

== See also ==
- List of solved missing person cases (2020s)
