= Stephanie Beacham =

English actress (born 1947)

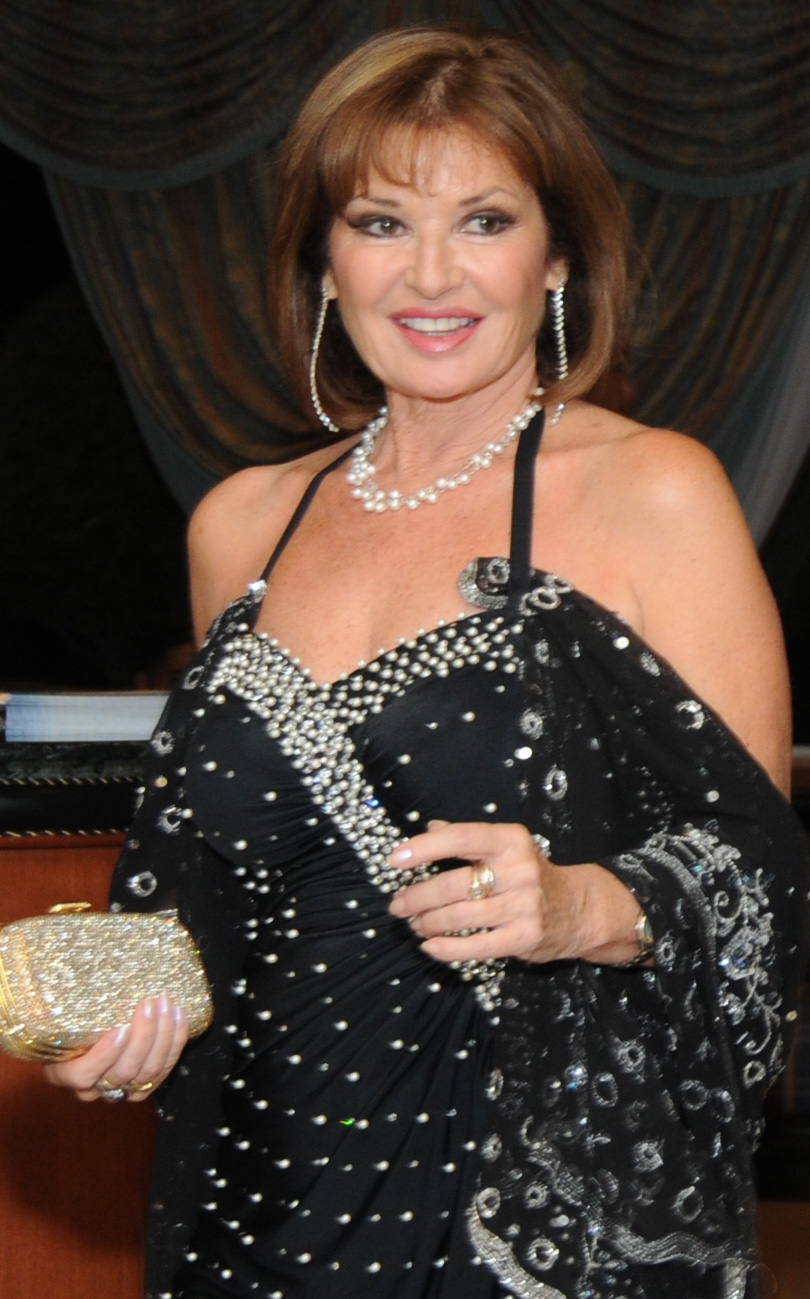
- Beacham in 2009
- Born: 28 February 1947 (age 79); Barnet, Hertfordshire, England
- Education: Royal Academy of Dramatic Art
- Occupation: Actress
- Years active: 1964–present
- Spouse: John McEnery (m. 1973; div. 1979)
- Partner(s): Bernie Greenwood (2008–present)
- Children: 2
- Website: stephaniebeacham.net

Stephanie Beacham (born 28 February 1947) is an English actress. In a career spanning six decades, she has a wide number of credits to her name on film, television, stage and radio in both the United Kingdom and the United States.

Beacham began appearing on British television in 1967 and made her big screen debut in the 1970 film The Games following this with roles in Tam Lin with Ava Gardner, and The Nightcomers opposite Marlon Brando. She had become widely known for her roles in multiple British Hammer Horror films before garnering acclaim with successful starring roles in British television series Tenko and Connie, and American series Dynasty and The Colbys.

Following the cancellation of Dynasty, Beacham starred in the title role in Sister Kate, Iris McKay in the American teen drama Beverly Hills, 90210, and as Dr. Kristin Westphalen in Steven Spielberg's NBC science fiction series SeaQuest DSV.

Beacham returned to the UK to play Phyl Oswyn in the ITV prison-based drama series Bad Girls and Martha Fraser in the long-running ITV soap opera Coronation Street. On reality television, she competed in Strictly Come Dancing and Celebrity Big Brother.

Beacham has appeared on stage on both the West End and Broadway, with roles including Mrs. Cheveley in An Ideal Husband, Elizabeth I in Elizabeth Rex and Maria Callas in Master Class. She was nominated for a Golden Globe Award in 1990 for her role in Sister Kate, and received several nominations for playing Sable Colby in The Colbys and Dynasty. In 2025, she was presented with the Lifetime Achievement Award at the National Film Awards.

== Early life ==
Beacham, one of four siblings, was born in Barnet, Hertfordshire, England, the daughter of Joan (née Wilkins), a housewife, and Alec, who was an insurance executive and later became the managing director of the Grosvenor estate. Beacham attended the Queen Elizabeth's Girls' Grammar School in Barnet. Aged 13, she hitch-hiked "all over Europe" with a group of friends.

Initially aspiring to become a ballerina, Beacham's dreams were cut short when her instructors told her that she would be unable to continue due to her partial deafness. Leaving school aged 17 in 1964, Beacham travelled to Boulogne-Billancourt in Paris, France, to study mime with Étienne Decroux with the goal of teaching dance movement to deaf children. While in Paris, Beacham got a job as an au-pair girl to help finance her mime school fees. After returning to the UK, Beacham visited a boyfriend who was acting at the Everyman Theatre in Liverpool. This sparked her interest in theatre and she became the wardrobe assistant before playing juvenile leads with the theatre. Beacham then attended the Royal Academy of Dramatic Art (RADA) in London.

== Career ==
=== 1960s ===
Beacham began a career in modelling before breaking into television. Her first screen role was in the BBC series The Queen's Traitor in 1967, in which she played Mary, Queen of Scots. During an interview, thinking Barnet sounded uninteresting, she told a reporter from the Northern Echo she was born in Casablanca, where her favourite Bogart/Bergman film was set. Beacham made many further guest appearances in television series such as The Saint with Roger Moore, Callan, and UFO.

=== 1970s ===
Beacham's first film roles were in The Games directed by Michael Winner, and Tam Lin directed by Roddy McDowall, both released in 1970. She would work with Winner again in 1971's The Nightcomers, in which she starred opposite Marlon Brando. Beacham appeared nude in one scene, during the filming of which Brando wore Y-fronts and Wellington boots under the bed clothes to ensure Winner did not film anything lower than was necessary. The Nightcomers would prove to be Beacham's breakout role.

Following the success of The Nightcomers, Beacham was promoting the film in New York City when she was approached by Joseph E. Levine who had bought the rights to the film. Levine attempted to pressure Beacham to pose nude for Playboy, saying that if she did, then he would guarantee her an Oscar nomination for her role in the film. Beacham refused saying that she only appeared nude in The Nightcomers as she "was in character"; this infuriated Levine and he blacklisted her from Hollywood. Beacham later revealed that she was approached by Sam Peckinpah for the main role in Straw Dogs (1971); Peckinpah told Beacham "You must have done something really bad because I'm a son of a bitch who can make anyone do anything and they won't let me use you" – the role subsequently went to Susan George.

Despite this, Beacham continued to appear in film, television and on stage in the UK. Horror would be a genre that Beacham appeared in often during this period, and she was subsequently cast as Jessica Van Helsing in Hammer's Dracula A.D. 1972 (1972) alongside Peter Cushing. Her next role was as a repertory player with the Nottingham Playhouse, where she played several lead and feature roles, including the role of Nora Helmer in the Henrik Ibsen play A Doll's House. In 1973, she played Georgina Layton in Thames Television's daytime drama Marked Personal (1973–1974). The same year, she made a British-Italian film, Super Bitch (1973), which was originally released in the US as Mafia Junction and in the UK as Blue Movie Blackmail. Beacham also continued to work in horror films, including And Now the Screaming Starts (1973), House of Mortal Sin (1975), Schizo (1976) and Inseminoid (1981) – a film she admits taking for the fee.

=== 1980s ===
From 1981 to 1982, Beacham featured as a member of the ensemble cast of the BBC series Tenko, about a group of women prisoners of war held captive by the Japanese after their invasion of Singapore in 1942. Following this, she continued working in theatre and television before landing the lead role in the 13-part ITV drama series Connie (1985). Her roles in Tenko and Connie helped to springboard her into one of her most well-remembered roles, that of the devious matriarch Sable Colby on the television series The Colbys (1985–1987). The Colbys was a spin-off of the opulent prime-time soap Dynasty which had been the highest rating programme in the USA that year. Beacham was cast opposite Charlton Heston as the tent-pole couple of the new show. The Colbys never experienced the success of its parent show and was cancelled after two seasons, though in 1988, Beacham was invited to reprise the role of Sable for the final season of Dynasty, playing opposite Joan Collins in a season-long "battle of the bitches" scenario. Beacham posed for Playboy in 1987.

Around this time, Beacham appeared in the comedy film Troop Beverly Hills with Shelley Long, and then landed the lead role in the children's fantasy film The Wolves of Willoughby Chase, playing an evil governess. She was then cast in the US sitcom Sister Kate, taking the lead role as a nun taking care of children in an orphanage. The series lasted for one season and was cancelled in 1990, though she earned a Golden Globe nomination for the role.

=== 1990s ===
Beacham then returned to Britain to play Mrs. Peacock in an ITV game show version of the board game Cluedo (1990). In 1990, Beacham appeared in the television miniseries Lucky Chances, based on the books written by Jackie Collins. Reuniting with Dynasty producer Aaron Spelling, Beacham also had a recurring guest role in the popular teen drama Beverly Hills, 90210, playing Iris McKay, the estranged mother of Luke Perry's character Dylan. In total, Beacham appeared in six television series produced by Spelling, including Dynasty and its spin-off, The Colbys; The Love Boat; Beverly Hills, 90210; Burke's Law; and Charmed.

In 1992, Beacham starred opposite Christopher Plummer in the film Secrets, and followed this with a role in the television miniseries To Be the Best with Anthony Hopkins. In 1993, Beacham played Countess Regina Bartholomew in the Star Trek: The Next Generation episode "Ship in a Bottle". Later in 1993, she signed on to play Dr. Kristin Westphalen in the NBC science fiction series seaQuest DSV, produced by Steven Spielberg. Her character was the chief oceanographer and medical doctor for the submarine seaQuest, however Beacham left the programme after its first season. Throughout the 1990s, she continued to make guest appearances on television programmes, working in both the UK and the US. Beacham was a judge on both Miss Universe 1994 and Miss World 2000. In 1995, Beacham starred in the play The Father alongside Edward Fox and in 1996, she starred in the BBC drama No Bananas which was set during World War II, and later appeared in the music video for Simply Red's single "Never Never Love" alongside Rula Lenska and Billie Whitelaw. For much of the remainder of the 1990s, Beacham appeared in roles in theatre; she played Mrs. Cheveley in a production of An Ideal Husband in Broadway in the US from 1996 to 1997 before embarking on a theatre tour of Australia in the same play and role in 1998.

=== 2000s ===
In 2002, Beacham played Elizabeth I in the play Elizabeth Rex at the Birmingham Repertory Theatre. Later that year she appeared in two American romantic comedy films: Unconditional Love and Would I Lie to You?. In 2003, Beacham returned to the UK to take a role in the ITV prison drama Bad Girls. She played inmate Phyllida "Phyl" Oswyn for four years, partnered with Beverly "Bev" Tull (played by Amanda Barrie) as the "Costa Cons". She remained with the series to the end in 2006. In 2006, she played the Wicked Witch in a production of Snow White and the Seven Dwarves in Guildford. She appeared there again the following year in a production of Jack and the Beanstalk. She also appeared in the 2006 movie Love and Other Disasters. She returned to stage work and toured the UK in 2007 as a lead in the Noël Coward play Hay Fever. Later that year, she competed in the 2007 series of the BBC's Strictly Come Dancing with professional partner Vincent Simone, though she was eliminated early in the competition (the second of fourteen celebrities) on 14 October 2007. In 2008, Beacham filmed scenes for Steven Berkoff's film, then known as Naked in London but later released as Moving Target.

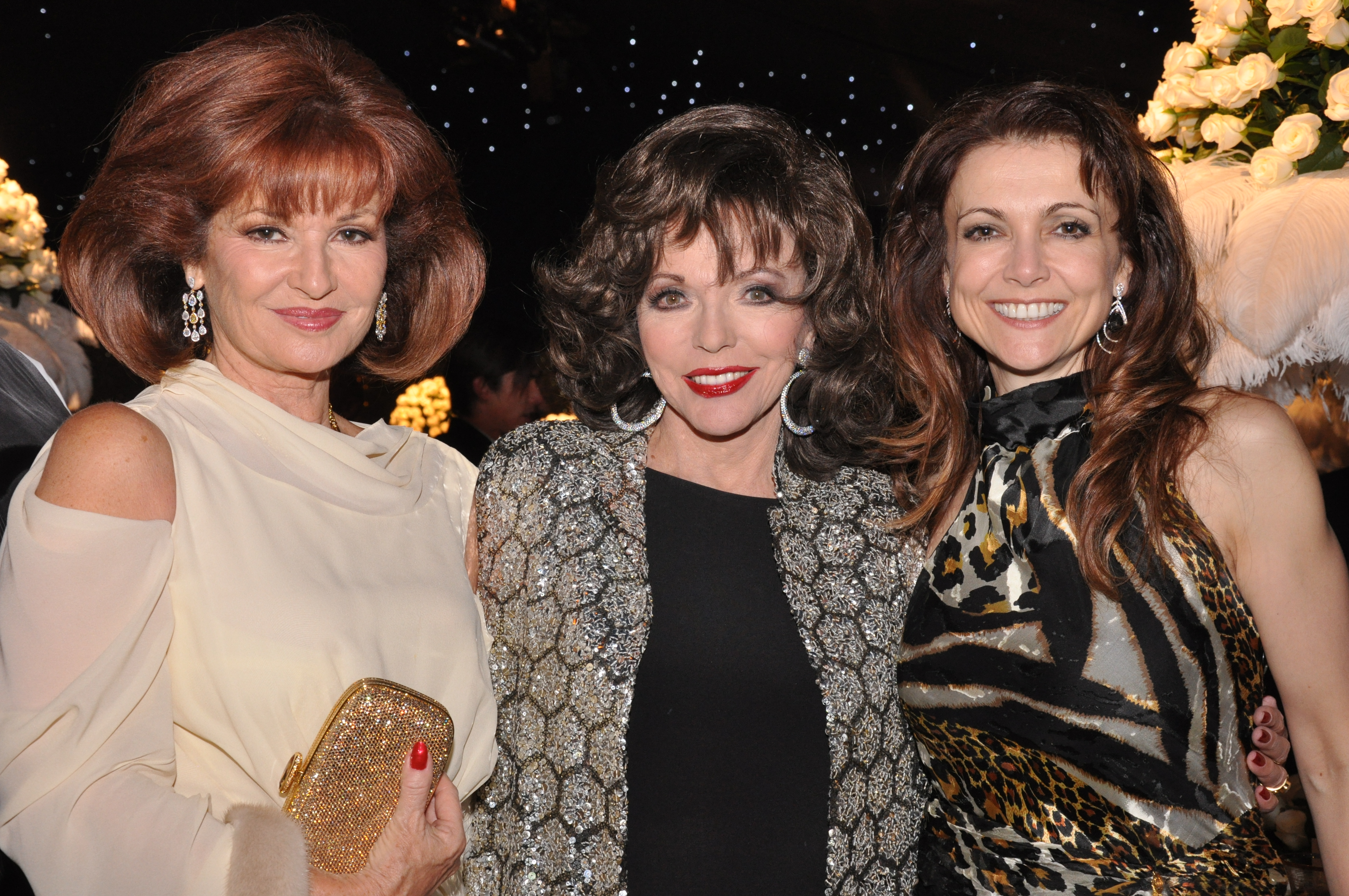
Beacham (left) with Dynasty and The Colbys co-stars Joan Collins and Emma Samms in 2009

In November 2008, it was announced that Beacham had joined the cast of ITV's Coronation Street portraying Martha Fraser, a love interest for Ken Barlow (played by William Roache). She made her first appearance on 26 January 2009, appearing in twenty-two episodes until her last appearance on 4 May 2009. Later in 2009, Beacham guest starred in an episode of the comedy series Free Agents.

=== 2010s ===
In February 2010, Beacham appeared in the final episode of the BBC series Material Girl. In April 2010, she made a guest appearance in the long-running BBC hospital drama series Casualty. She then starred as Maria Callas in a UK tour of Master Class from 2010 to 2011. In January 2010, Beacham entered Channel 4's seventh and final series of Celebrity Big Brother as a housemate; she was the only female to make it to the final and finished in fifth place on 29 January 2010.

In October 2011, Beacham released her autobiography Many Lives, in which she discusses her life and career. The book includes a foreword written by her Coronation Street co-star William Roache. In 2012, Beacham reunited with her Dynasty co-star Joan Collins in a UK television advert for Snickers. She also appeared as store manager Lorraine Chain in Sky1's supermarket-based sitcom Trollied for eight episodes between August 2012 and October 2012. The same year, she also appeared in three episodes of Sky Living's Mount Pleasant as Aunty Pam, and in January 2013, Beacham guest starred in an episode of Death in Paradise. From 2014 to 2016 she played June Whitfield's daughter Maureen in the BBC sitcom Boomers. She also starred in the film Wild Oats (2016) with Shirley MacLaine and Demi Moore.

In October 2016, Beacham starred as Princess Margaret in the play A Princess Undone by Richard Stirling which premiered at the Cambridge Arts Theatre. In 2017, Beacham starred opposite Miriam Margolyes in the comedy series Bucket. In 2018, Beacham filmed a role in the television pilot Carol & Vinnie, directed by Dan Zeff, however it was not broadcast. In August 2018, Beacham took part in the television series The Real Marigold Hotel in which she and other celebrities including Susan George and Stanley Johnson tour around Udaipur in India exploring the Indian culture.

=== 2020s ===
In February 2021, Beacham's agent and novelist Melanie Blake announced plans to plans to launch a new British soap opera, Falcon Bay. She confirmed that Beacham would star in the soap if she secures the rights to the production. In October 2022, Beacham had a role in the action thriller film Renegades alongside Lee Majors, Danny Trejo and Patsy Kensit. In November 2022, it was announced that Beacham would reprise the role of Martha Fraser in Coronation Street. Her comeback episode was broadcast on 21 November 2022, and she appeared for a six-episode stint until departing. In December 2022, Beacham guest-starred in an episode of Whitstable Pearl and played Elizabeth Hurley's mother in the Christmas romantic comedy film Christmas in the Caribbean.

In 2023, Beacham starred in three films: Nessie, Forever Young and Grey Matter. In August 2023, Beacham appeared at the Edinburgh Fringe Festival, in conversation with Christopher Biggins discussing her life and career in an event named An Audience with Stephanie Beacham. In July 2025, Beacham was presented with the Lifetime Achievement Award at the National Film Awards.

== Other ventures ==
=== Philanthropy and activism ===
In 2009, Beacham was involved in launching the Sense National Deafblind and Rubella Association Fill in the Gaps campaign which aims to give the elderly the support they need to maintain a good quality of life. She also attended the Parliamentary launch of the campaign in June 2006. Beacham is also a spokesperson for the American Speech–Language–Hearing Association, which supports those with communication disabilities, and is a member of the British Tinnitus Association, as well as being on the Board of Free Arts for Abused Children in Los Angeles which gives abused children access to the arts for therapeutic value.

In 2017, Beacham appeared in a promotional film for Unison, voicing her support for their Pay Up Now campaign, encouraging the British government to give public service workers a pay increase.

=== Business ventures ===
In 2009, Beacham launched her own range of skincare and beauty products, Glow by Stephanie Beacham. The range proved to be a bestseller, selling fifty thousand units within a month of launching.

== Personal life ==
Beacham is partially deaf, having been born with no hearing in her right ear and 80% hearing in her left ear. She has said that this was partially caused by her mother having chicken pox while she was pregnant with her.

She married actor John McEnery in 1973, having met while both performing with the Everyman Theatre. Beacham became pregnant shortly after the wedding but had a bad fall on stage during a rehearsal and suffered a miscarriage when she was three months pregnant. She revealed in an interview her stillborn son was cremated. Beacham and McEnery divorced in 1979. They have two daughters.

She dated Marlon Brando after starring with him in The Nightcomers (1971) and later had relationships with Eric Clapton and Imran Khan in the 1980s, then a cricketer, later a politician who became Prime Minister of Pakistan. Beacham is in a relationship with Bernie Greenwood; the couple became engaged in 2013.

Beacham splits her time between homes in London, Malibu, Morocco and Spain.

Beacham was successfully treated for skin cancer in 2009. She had a recurrence of the disease in 2011 but again recovered.

In March 2016, Beacham told The Sunday Telegraph that she had been raped when she had been an up-and-coming actress in her twenties.

On 25 September 2022, Beacham was confronted by a burglar inside her London home who threatened her with a crowbar and stole items including her mobile phone, purse and jewellery before fleeing the property. The offender, who had sixty-four previous convictions, was subsequently sentenced to ten years and five months in prison.

== Filmography ==
=== Film ===
Year	Title	Role	Notes
1970	The Games	Angela Simmonds	
1970	Tam Lin	Janet Ainsley	Alternative titles: The Ballad of Tam Lin and The Devil's Widow
1971	The Nightcomers	Miss Jessel	
1972	Dracula A.D. 1972	Jessica Van Helsing	
1973	Super Bitch	Joanne	Alternative titles: Mafia Junction and Blue Movie Blackmail
1973	And Now the Screaming Starts!	Catherine Fengriffen	
1975	House of Mortal Sin	Vanessa Welch	Alternative title: The Confessional
1976	Schizo	Beth	
1981	Inseminoid	Kate	Alternative title: Horror Planet
1989	Troop Beverly Hills	Vicki Sprantz	
1989	The Wolves of Willoughby Chase	Letitia Slighcarp	
1990	Harry and Harriet	Christine Petersen	
1990	The Lilac Bus	Judy	
1992	Secrets	Sabina Quarles	
1992	To Be the Best	Arabella	
1993	Foreign Affairs	Rosemary Radley	
1993	Riders	Molly Carter	
1996	Wedding Bell Blues	Tanya's Mother	
2000	Relative Values	Elizabeth	
2002	Unconditional Love	Harriet Fox-Smith	Alternative title: Who Shot Victor Fox?
2002	Would I Lie to You?	Amaelia	
2006	Seven Days of Grace	Dana	
2006	Love and Other Disasters	Felicity Riggs-Wentworth	
2006	The Witches Hammer	Madeline	
2007	Plot 7	Emma Osterman	
2011	Moving Target	Helen	
2016	Wild Oats	Tammy	
2019	Trip's Duplage	Diana Duplage	Short film
2021	Rap Grandma	Emily	
2022	Renegades	Hartigan	
2022	Christmas in the Caribbean	Chloe	
2023	Nessie	Samantha	
2023	Forever Young	Jane Green	
2023	Grey Matter	Peg	
2024	Duchess	Charlie	

=== Television ===
Year	Title	Role	Notes
1967	Out of Town Theatre	The Girl	Episode: "The Picnic"
1967	The Queen's Traitor	Mary Queen of Scots	TV movie
1968	ITV Playhouse	Lisa Wendle	Episode: "Bon Voyage"
1968	The Saint	Penny	Episode: "Legacy for the Saint"
1968	The Jazz Age	Charlotte Tonn	Episode: "Black Exchange"
1968	Love Story	Celia	Episode: "The Proposal"
1969	Armchair Theatre	Linda	Episode: "On Vacation"
1969	Public Eye	Shirley Marlowe	Episode: "My Life's My Own"
1969	The Distracted Preacher	Lizzy Newberry	TV movie
1970	Callan	Beth Lampton	Episode: "God Help Your Friends"
1970	Sentimental Education	Rosanette	Episode: "The Philanderer"
1970	UFO	Sarah Bosanquet	Episode: "Destruction"
1971	ITV Sunday Night Theatre	Anna Trenton	Episode: "Tales of Piccadilly: The Way Out"
1972	ITV Sunday Night Theatre	Jenny Draper	Episode: "Last Year's Confetti"
1972	Jason King	Cora Simpson	Episode: "Chapter One: The Company I Keep"
1972	Man at the Top	Paula Fraser	2 episodes
1973	The Adventurer	Contessa Maria	Episode: "Icons Are Forever"
1973	The Protectors	Chrissie	Episode: "Your Witness"
1973	Special Branch	Sue Arden	Episode: "Threat"
1973	Jane Eyre	Blanche Ingram	Episode: "Part 3"
1973	Ego Hugo	Adèle Hugo	TV movie
1973–1974	Marked Personal	Georgina Layton	62 episodes
1974	Napoleon and Love	Madame Duchatel	Episode: "Eleanore"
1975	Whodunnit?	Helen Brent	Episode: "Too Many Cooks"
1975	Prometheus: The Life of Balzac	Fanny Lovell	TV Mini-series
1976	Hadleigh	Susan Debray	Episode: "Film Story"
1976	Forget Me Not	Jeanne Teliot	Episode: "Rich"
1978	Rainbow	Special Guest Narrator	Episode: "Wild Animals"
1979	I vecchi e i giovani	Nicoletta	4 episodes
1981–1982	Tenko	Rose Millar	19 episodes
1984	Sorrell and Son	Florence Palfrey	Episode: #1.1
1984	Hammer House of Mystery and Suspense	Rosemary Richardson	Episode: "A Distant Scream"
1985	Connie	Connie	All 13 episodes
1985–1987	The Colbys	Sable Colby	49 episodes
1985; 1988–1989	Dynasty	Sable Colby	Guest (season 6), main (season 9); 23 episodes
1986	The Love Boat	Elaine Riskin	Episode: "The Shipshape Cruise"
1987	Napoleon and Josephine: A Love Story	Therese Tallien	3 episodes
1988	French and Saunders	Doreena Petherbridge	Episode: #2.5
1989	ALF	Margaret Thatcher	Episode: "ALF Takes over the Network"
1989–1990	Sister Kate	Sister Kate Lambert	All 19 episodes
1990	Cluedo	Mrs. Peacock	6 episodes
1990	Lucky Chances	Susan Martino Santangelo	TV Mini-series
1991; 1993–1994	Beverly Hills, 90210	Iris McKay	8 episodes
1992	To Be the Best	Arabella Sutton	2 episodes
1993	Star Trek: The Next Generation	Countess Bartholomew	Episode: "Ship in a Bottle"
1993	Blossom	Mrs. Robinson	Episode "Hunger"
1993–1994	seaQuest DSV	Dr. Kristin Westphalen	23 episodes
1993–1995	Noel's House Party	Lady Sarah Jane Parker	3 episodes
1994	Burke's Law	Victoria Lancer	Episode: "Who Killed Skippy's Master?"
1994	A Change of Place	Marie	TV movie
1995	Legend	Vera Slaughter	Episode: "Birth of a Legend"
1995	High Society	Stella	Episode: "We Ought to Be in Pictures"
1996	No Bananas	Dorothea Grant	10 episodes
1997	Noel's House Party	Isadora Fedora	Episode: #6.19
1997	The Lily Savage Show	Lily Savage stand-in	Episode: #1.2
2000	Charmed	Martha van Lewen	Episode: "Reckless Abandon"
2001	Reston Hawk: Attorney	Marissa Hobson	2 episodes
2002	Having It Off	Vernice Green	Episode: "Perms of Endearment"
2003–2006	Bad Girls	Phyllida "Phyl" Oswyn	40 episodes
2004	The Bold and the Beautiful	Stephanie Beacham	Episode: #1.4434
2006	New Tricks	Rhoda Wishaw	Episode: "Wicca Work"
2009	Free Agents	Wendy	Episode: : #1.6
2009, 2022	Coronation Street	Martha Fraser	21 episodes
2010	Material Girl	Sylvie Montrose	Episode: #1.6
2010	Casualty	Monica Shapiro	Episode: "Love of a Good Man"
2012	Mount Pleasant	Aunty Pam	3 episodes
2012	Trollied	Lorraine	8 episodes
2013	Death in Paradise	Nicole Seymour	Episode: "Murder on the Plantation"
2014–2016	Boomers	Maureen	All 13 episodes
2017	Bucket	Pat	3 episodes
2022	Whitstable Pearl	Zelda St. John	Episode: "The Gumshoe and the Femme Fatale"
2025	The Sunshine Murders	Lady Gloria Whitten-Soames	Episode: "The Art of Murder"

=== Video games ===
Year	Title	Role	Notes
1994	SeaQuest DSV	Dr. Kristin Westphalen	Voice

=== Music videos ===
Year	Artist	Title	Role
1996	Simply Red	"Never Never Love"	Stephanie Beacham

== Theatre ==
=== Plays ===
Year	Title	Role	Venue
1964–1965	Henry IV	Lady Mortimer	Everyman Theatre, Liverpool, UK
1964–1965	The Servant of Two Masters	Clarice	Everyman Theatre, Liverpool, UK
1964–1965	Macbeth	First Witch	Everyman Theatre, Liverpool, UK
1964–1965	Toad of Toad Hall	Marigold / Phoebe	Everyman Theatre, Liverpool, UK
1965	The Merchant of Venice	Portia	Royal Academy of Dramatic Art, UK
1965	Twelfth Night	Maria	Royal Academy of Dramatic Art, UK
1966	Oedipus	Jocasta	Royal Academy of Dramatic Art, UK
1966	Three Sisters	Irina Sergeyevna Prozorova	Royal Academy of Dramatic Art, UK
1967	Guys and Dolls	Doll	Royal Academy of Dramatic Art, UK
1967	Monsieur Barnett	Yasmina	Theatre Royal, Bristol, UK
1967	The Madwoman of Chaillot	Irma	Oxford Playhouse, UK
1968	Arms and the Man	Louka	Oxford Playhouse, UK
1968	Gas Light	Nancy	Oxford Playhouse, UK
1968	The Silent Woman	Mavis	Oxford Playhouse, UK
1970	Tea Party	Wendy	Duchess Theatre, London, UK
1970	The Basement	Jane	Duchess Theatre, London, UK
1971	The Tempest	Juno	Nottingham Playhouse, UK
1971	The Homecoming	Ruth	Nottingham Playhouse, UK
1972	A Doll's House	Nora Helmer	Nottingham Playhouse, UK
1976	On Approval	Helen Hayle	Theatre Royal Haymarket, West End, London, UK
1977	Absurd Person Singular	Eva	Coventry Theatre, UK
1978	The London Cuckolds	Eugenia Dashwell	Royal Court Theatre, London, UK
1978	The Singular Life of Albert Nobbs	Hubert Page	New End Theatre, London, UK
1978	An Audience Called Edouard	Berthe	Greenwich Theatre, London, UK
1978–1980	Can You Hear Me at the Back?	Margery Hartnoll	Piccadilly Theatre, West End, London, UK
1982	Terra Nova	Kathleen Scott	Watford Palace Theatre, UK
1983	Twelfth Night	Olivia	UK
1983	Happy Family	Deborah Solstice	Duke of York's Theatre, West End, London, UK
1984	Venice Preserv’d	Aquilina	Lyttleton Theatre, London, UK
1987	The Rover	Angellica Bianca	Mermaid Theatre, London, UK
1991	The Vortex	Florence Lancaster	Ahmanson Theatre, Los Angeles, US
1992–1993	Love Letters	Melissa Gardner	Canon Theater, Los Angeles, US
1995–1996	The Father	Laura	Theatre Royal, Bath, UK
1996–1997	An Ideal Husband	Mrs. Cheveley	Ethel Barrymore Theatre, Broadway, New York, US
1997	Lady Windermere's Fan	Mrs. Erlynne	Chichester Festival Theatre, UK
1997	Anyone Can Whistle	The Narrator	Savoy Theatre, London, UK
1997	Silhouette	Celia Wallis	UK Tour
1998	An Ideal Husband	Mrs. Cheveley	Australia Tour
1998	Equally Divided	Renata	UK Tour
1999–2000	Funny About Love	Rosie	UK Tour
2000	A Busy Day	Lady Wilhelmina Tylney	Lyric Theatre, London, UK
2001	An Ideal Husband	Mrs. Cheveley	Paper Mill Playhouse, New Jersey, US
2001–2002	Nobody's Perfect	Harriet Copland	UK Tour
2002	Elizabeth Rex	Elizabeth I	Birmingham Repertory Theatre, UK
2004	Dinner	Paige	UK Tour
2007	Hay Fever	Judith Bliss	UK Tour
2010–2011	Master Class	Maria Callas	UK Tour
2016	A Princess Undone	Princess Margaret	Cambridge Arts Theatre, UK

=== Pantomime ===
Year	Title	Role	Venue
2006–2007	Snow White and the Seven Dwarfs	Wicked Queen Sadista	Yvonne Arnaud Theatre, Guildford, UK
2007–2008	Jack and the Beanstalk	Venus Flytrap	Yvonne Arnaud Theatre, Guildford, UK
2013–2014	Snow White and the Seven Dwarfs	The Wicked Queen	Birmingham Hippodrome, UK

== Radio ==
Year	Title	Role	Notes
1968	A Handful of Dust	Brenda Last	For BBC Radio 4
1999	Hands Across the Sea	Piggie Gilpin	For BBC Radio 4
2008	The Saturday Play	Chloe Carlisle	Episode: "Murder Every Monday"; For BBC Radio 4

== Awards and nominations ==
Year	Award	Nominated work	Category	Result
1986	Soap Opera Digest Award	The Colbys	Outstanding Villainess on a Prime Time Serial	Nominated
1988	Soap Opera Digest Award	The Colbys	Outstanding Villainess: Prime Time	Nominated
1990	Soap Opera Digest Award	Dynasty	Outstanding Lead Actress: Prime Time	Nominated
1990	Golden Globe Award	Sister Kate	Best Actress – Television Series Musical or Comedy	Nominated
2025	National Film Award	Grey Matter	Best Actress	Nominated
2025	National Film Award	N/A	Lifetime Achievement Award	Won

== Bibliography ==
- Many Lives, Hay House, 2011. ISBN 978-1-84850-829-3.
