= The Rice Thresher =

Student newspaper

- Type: Student newspaper
- Format: Tabloid
- School: Rice University
- Editor-in-chief: James Cancelarich
- Founded: 1916
- Headquarters: Houston, Texas
- Website: ricethresher.org
- Free online archives: texashistory.unt.edu/explore/titles/t02888/ (1916–2012)

The Rice Thresher is the weekly student newspaper of Rice University in Houston, Texas. It was first published in 1916. It has an estimated circulation of 3,000 and is distributed throughout the university and its surrounding areas.

The Thresher has won numerous awards from journalism organizations like the Society of Professional Journalists, Texas Intercollegiate Press Association, the College Media Association (CMA), and the Associated Collegiate Press (ACP), including Best Newspaper for a 4-year University under 5,000 from CMA (2016, 2018, 2019, 2020, 2022), two All-American ratings from ACP (2009–2010, 1995–1996), and five Newspaper Pacemaker Finalist Awards (2026, 2018, 2017, 2003, 2000). In 2019, the Thresher was named the 2nd best college newspaper in the United States by the Princeton Review, up from 3rd best in 2018 and 12th best in 2017.

The Thresher runs on a six-figure annual budget, employs over 100 staffers, and is distributed each Wednesday of the school year with the exception of examinations periods and holidays. The paper is separated into six sections: News, Opinion, Features, Arts & Entertainment, Sports, and the satirical Backpage. In Fall 2026, the paper added a seventh section, Special Investigations, which does not print every week.

== History ==
The Rice Thresher was the first student publication to be formed at the Rice Institute despite it appearing in the fourth academic year (1915–1916). In the fall of 1915, three literary societies - the Elizabeth Baldwin (female), the Owl (male), and the Riceonian (male) - elected three members each to serve on a committee to organize the paper. The committee then selected the founding editorial board, composed entirely of committee members plus two additional students. On Saturday, January 15, 1916, the first issue of the then-bi-weekly Thresher was published under the guidance of editor-in-chief William M. Standish.

In 1918, two seminal events occurred to transform the Thresher into its modern iteration. First, a voluntary blanket tax was established for publications and sports events. The voluntary tax provided the Thresher $1.50 from each student who paid, and the now mandatory blanket tax remains the backbone of Thresher finances to this day. Second, in May 1918, the Thresher and all other student organizations were transferred under the purview of the newly-formed Student Association, inaugurating a system whereby the leadership of the paper would be elected by the student body along with the Campanile leadership and other student officers. During a divisive May 1918 election, students who had paid their blanket tax elected John T. Rather editor in chief and T. J. Burnett managing editor. However, no issues were published during Rather's stewardship, owing to a suspension of student activities until the end of World War I. Post-war, a second Student Association election was held in January 1919 and installed Joe R. Shannon as editor in chief, Paul Frederick Bobb as managing editor, and Graham Peck as business manager, resulting in the first issue of the new era on February 6, 1919. From this issue forward, the Thresher has published weekly with a few deviations. Over the years, the sections, masthead, offices elected, page dimensions, and number of pages have fluctuated, but the modern Thresher was born in 1918.

The Thresher has stopped printing twice before: once during World War I, and once during the spring of 2020 due to the COVID-19 pandemic, during which most students were asked to leave campus for fear of infection.
