= List of British films of 1991 =

A list of films produced in the United Kingdom in 1991 (see 1991 in film):

== 1991 ==
Title	Director	Cast	Genre	Notes
1991
30 Door Key	Jerzy Skolimowski	Iain Glen, Robert Stephens, Crispin Glover	Drama	British–French–Polish co-production
A Kiss Before Dying	James Dearden	Matt Dillon, Sean Young, Max von Sydow, Diane Ladd, James Russo	Romantic thriller	Co-production with the US
Afraid of the Dark	Mark Peploe	James Fox, Fanny Ardant	Drama	Co-production with France
American Friends	Tristran Powell	Michael Palin, Connie Booth, Trini Alvarado	Comedy	
An American Tail: Fievel Goes West	Phil Nibbelink, Simon Wells	James Stewart, Dom DeLuise, Amy Irving, John Cleese	Animated western comedy	
The Assassin of the Tsar	'Karen Shakhnazarov	Oleg Yankovsky, Malcolm McDowell, Armen Dzhigarkhanyan	Drama, history	Co-production Soviet union and United Kingdom. Entered into the 1991 Cannes Film Festival
The Ballad of the Sad Café	Simon Callow	Vanessa Redgrave, Keith Carradine	Drama	Entered into the 41st Berlin International Film Festival
Blonde Fist	Frank Clarke	Margi Clarke, Carroll Baker, Ken Hutchison	Drama/sport	
Buddy's Song	Claude Whatham	Roger Daltrey, Chesney Hawkes	Drama/comedy	
Close My Eyes	Stephen Poliakoff	Alan Rickman, Clive Owen, Saskia Reeves	Drama	
December Bride	Thaddeus O'Sullivan	Saskia Reeves, Donal McCann, Ciarán Hinds		British-Irish co-production
Dream On	Amber Production Team, Sirkka-Liisa Konttinen	Anna-Marie Gascoigne, Maureen Harold, Amber Styles	Drama/music	Co-production with Finland
Drop Dead Fred	Ate de Jong	Phoebe Cates, Rik Mayall, Marsha Mason, Tim Matheson, Carrie Fisher	Black comedy fantasy	
Edward II	Derek Jarman	Steven Waddington, Kevin Collins, Andrew Tiernan	Historical drama	Co-production with Japan
Get Back	Richard Lester	Paul McCartney, Linda McCartney, Hamish Stuart	Concert	
The Grass Arena	Gillies MacKinnon	Pete Postlethwaite, Lynsey Baxter	Drama	
Hear My Song	Peter Chelsom	Adrian Dunbar, Tara Fitzgerald, Ned Beatty	Drama/comedy	Based on the story of the Irish tenor Josef Locke
Howling VI: The Freaks	Hope Perello	Brendan Hughes, Bruce Payne	Horror	
Impromptu	James Lapine	Judy Davis, Hugh Grant	Drama	
Let Him Have It	Peter Medak	Christopher Eccleston, Tom Courtenay	Crime	
London Kills Me	Hanif Kureishi	Justin Chadwick, Steven Mackintosh	Comedy	
Meeting Venus	István Szabó	Glenn Close, Niels Arestrup	Drama	Co-production with Japan, the US and Hungary
The Pope Must Die	Peter Richardson	Robbie Coltrane, Adrian Edmondson, Annette Crosbie	Comedy	
The Princess and the Goblin	József Gémes	Joss Ackland, Claire Bloom, Roy Kinnear, Sally Ann Marsh, Rik Mayall, Peggy Mount, Peter Murray, Victor Spinetti, Mollie Sugden, Frank Rozelaar Green, William Hootkins, Maxine Howe, Steve Lyons, Robin Lyons	Animated fantasy	Co-production with Hungary, Japan, the US and Denmark
Prospero's Books	Peter Greenaway	John Gielgud, Michel Blanc, Erland Josephson	Shakespearean	Adaptation of The Tempest
Robin Hood	John Irvin	Patrick Bergin, Uma Thurman, Jeroen Krabbé	Adventure	
Rock-A-Doodle	Don Bluth	Sorrell Booke, Glen Campbell, Sandy Duncan	Family	
Thelma & Louise	Ridley Scott	Susan Sarandon, Geena Davis, Harvey Keitel	Adventure crime drama	
Where Angels Fear to Tread	Charles Sturridge	Rupert Graves, Helen Mirren, Helena Bonham Carter	Literary drama	Based on the novel by E. M. Forster
Under Suspicion	Simon Moore	Liam Neeson, Laura San Giacomo	Thriller	
Young Soul Rebels	Isaac Julien	Sophie Okonedo, Jason Durr, Frances Barber	Drama	

== See also ==
- 1991 in film
- 1990 in British music
- 1990 in British radio
- 1990 in British television
- 1990 in the United Kingdom
- List of 1991 box office number-one films in the United Kingdom
