= 1990 in British radio =

This is a list of events in British radio during 1990.

== Events ==
=== January ===
- 3 January – Radio Clyde splits on a permanent basis with the full time launch of its classic hits service on MW. The FM station, Clyde 1, relaunches as a contemporary hit music station.
- 6 January – BBC Radio 2 becomes available on FM on Saturday afternoons for the first time. Previously the station's FM frequencies were loaned out at this time to BBC Radio 1 but this is no longer necessary as Radio 1 is now available on FM across much of the UK. The weekday late evening ‘borrow’ had ceased in October 1988.
- 8 January –
  - BBC Radio 1 launches a new 30 minute news programme News 90 which replaces the teatime edition of Newsbeat.
  - BBC Radio 1 launches a new jingles package called ‘’Music Radio for the 90s’’.
- Undated in January
  - Frances Line replaces Bryant Marriott as controller of BBC Radio 2.
  - Delta Radio begins broadcasting as an opt-out of County Sound for the Haslemere district on what was originally intended to be a relay transmitter for County Sound.

=== February ===
- 5 February – Greenwich Time Signal generation moves from the Royal Observatory to the BBC at Broadcasting House in London.
- 7 February – Cool FM begins broadcasting in Belfast. It replaces Downtown Radio on FM with Downtown continuing on MW. Downtown continues to be available on FM in other areas of Northern Ireland.
- 11 February – BBC Radio 1 starts broadcasting on FM in south west England.

=== March ===
- 4 March – Jazz FM, a station playing mainly soul and jazz music, launches with an Ella Fitzgerald concert at the Royal Albert Hall.
- 17 March – Gary King joins Radio 1, to take over the early breakfast show, initially replacing Tim Smith at weekends before moving to the weekday early show to replace Jackie Brambles, who moves to the weekday drivetime show.
- 25 March – BBC Radio 1 'borrows' BBC Radio 2's FM frequencies for the final time. However Radio 1 on FM is still unavailable in some parts of England so some BBC local radio stations broadcast the Top 40 programme so that many listeners in England where Radio 1 is still only available on MW can continue to hear the programme in stereo.
- 29 March – Ahead of major changes to BBC Radio 2’s output, Brian Matthew goes Round Midnight for the final time.
- 31 March –
  - Sounds of the 50s, presented by Ronnie Hilton, is launched and Brian Matthew takes over as host of Sounds of the 60s.
  - Launch of Choice FM, the first black station with a London-wide commercial licence. The station broadcasts on 96.9FM.

=== April ===
- 2 April – The changes to weekday programming on BBC Radio 2 begin on this date. Ken Bruce launches a new late night programme with Judith Chalmers replacing Bruce on mid-mornings, a weeknight late night jazz show called Jazz Parade is launched and a weekday guest afternoon slot is introduced featuring a different personality choosing their favourite music each week.
- 6 April – The first edition of The Arts Programme on BBC Radio 2 is broadcast. The programme airs on Friday, Saturday and Sunday evenings between 10pm and midnight.
- 12 April – BBC Radio 1 starts broadcasting on FM in north east England.
- April – BBC Radio introduces new logos for its national radio stations.

=== May ===
- 24 May – BBC Radio 1 begins FM transmission in Central Southern England. Also during 1990, the transmitters established in 1988 start to broadcast with higher power.

=== June ===
- 1 June – Red Rose Radio, which was transmitted in Lancashire on 97.4 MHz and 999 kHz, is split into two stations – Red Rose Rock FM using the FM frequency and Red Rose Gold on the medium wave frequency.
- 2 June – Ahead of the ending of sports coverage on BBC Radio 2, and the consequent cessation of sports news on the FM waveband, the 10pm evening round-up starts to be aired only on MW. The change also sees the weekday late evening round-up moved from 9:55pm to just after the 10pm news.
- 22 June – Orchard FM expands its coverage southwards when a transmitter covering the southern parts of south Somerset and parts of north Dorset is switched on.
- 25 June
  - Spectrum Radio launches, broadcasting programmes for London's various ethnic communities. However the frequency allocated to the station is being used by pirate station Radio Caroline, thereby causing interference with Spectrum's transmissions. The Independent Broadcasting Authority, in agreement with the Department for Trade and Industry, allows Spectrum to broadcast temporarily on 990 kHz alongside 558 kHz. Caroline eventually vacates the 558 kHz frequency and the temporary transmitter is switched off.
  - Two more Incremental radio stations launch – Airport Information Radio, providing travel information for users of Heathrow Airport and Gatwick Airport, and Glasgow station East End Radio. Both turn out to be short lived. Airport Information Radio closes the following year and East End Radio closes when it has its licence revoked.
- 28 June – The Independent Broadcasting Authority begins trials of AM Stereo on the MW transmitters of Radio Orwell. They lasts until the end of July.
- 29 June – Programmes For Schools are broadcast on BBC Radio 4 for the final time.
- 30 June – All BBC Radio 2 sports desks from 10am onwards are now broadcast only on MW with just the first three desks of the day, aired at breakfast time, still carried on FM.

=== July ===
- 8 July – Wimbledon is broadcast on BBC Radio 2 for the final time. From next year, the event is broadcast on BBC Radio 5.
- 27 July – BBC Radio 1 starts broadcasting on FM across Lincolnshire and East Yorkshire.

=== August ===
- Undated in August – Atlantic 252 starts broadcasting in the evening and is now on air from 6 am until 2 am.
- 14 August – At 8.31am, a sports desk is broadcast on BBC Radio 2's FM frequencies for the final time, although a ’Sports Round-Up’ continues to be part of the Derek Jameson breakfast show.
- 15 August – BBC Radio 2 begins to wind down its transmissions on MW ahead of the launch of BBC Radio 5 by providing a daytime information service providing advice about how to listen to Radio 2 on FM.
- 20 August – The Moral Maze is broadcast for the first time on BBC Radio 4.
- 24 August – Listening Corner, the weekday lunchtime programme for small children, is broadcast for the final time. This marks the end of children's programming on Radio 4 until 1994.
- 26 August –
  - Sport is broadcast on BBC Radio 2 for the final time with the final sports desk broadcast at 10.02pm.
  - Educational programmes are broadcast on BBC Radio 4's FM transmitters for the final time – educational programmes will return to Radio 4 in 1994 but will be broadcast only on long wave.
- 27 August –
  - At midnight, BBC Radio 2 stops broadcasting on MW. Consequently, Radio 2 becomes the first national radio station in the UK to broadcast only on FM.
  - At 9am, the BBC's long-awaited fifth national radio station, BBC Radio 5 is launched on the old Radio 2 mediumwave frequencies. The station mainly carries sports, children's and educational programmes along with a selection of programmes from the World Service.
  - Following the transfer of all of BBC radio's educational and children's programming from Radio 4's FM frequencies to Radio 5, the full BBC Radio 4 schedule is available on FM for the first time.

=== September ===
- 1 September –
  - Kiss 100 begins broadcasting legally for the first time when it launches in London. The station had previously operated as a pirate broadcaster.
  - Following the transfer of BBC Radio Sport to Radio 5, Sport on 2 is renamed Sport on 5.
- 30 September – Mark Goodier replaces Bruno Brookes as host of BBC Radio 1’s Top 40 show.

=== October ===
- 1 October –
  - The Evening Session debuts on BBC Radio 1, presented by Mark Goodier.
  - BBC Radio 3 stays on air for an extra 30 minutes on weeknights, ending broadcasting at 12.35am. The station continues to close at midnight at the weekend.
- 6 October – The Superstation closes after 2 years 3 months on air after going into liquidation.
- 8 October – Severn Sound splits into two services, with Severn Sound continuing on FM with 3 Counties Radio launching on MW.
- 21 October – The Network Chart is expanded to a top 40 chart and the length of the programme is extended by just under an hour, starting after the 4 pm IRN bulletin – although not all of the stations take the extra hour to begin with.

=== November ===
- 1 November – The Broadcasting Act 1990 receives Royal Assent, paving the way for deregulation of the British commercial broadcasting industry.
- 5 November
  - The last of the IBA's Incremental Radio licenses, Sunderland station Wear FM, starts broadcasting.
  - Offshore "pirate" radio station Radio Caroline ceases broadcasting.

=== December ===
- 30 December – WABC begins broadcasting to Shropshire.

=== Unknown ===
- The Piccadilly brand name returns to the FM band in Manchester when Key 103 is rebranded as Piccadilly Key 103.
- Sean Rafferty fronts the first chat show on BBC Radio Ulster, entitled Rafferty.
- BBC Radio 1 starts broadcasting split travel bulletins during the Simon Mayo Breakfast Show. This allows for the London area to receive a separate bulletin from the rest of the country. One is broadcast live, the other recorded during the preceding record.

== Station debuts ==
- 3 January – Clyde 2
- 17 January – BBC CWR
- 22 January – Radio Borders
- 7 February – Cool FM
- 17 February – KFM
- 4 March – 102.2 Jazz FM
- 18 March – Radio Thamesmead
- 31 March – Choice FM
- 6 April –
  - KCBC
  - Belfast Community Radio
- 12 April – BBC Radio Suffolk
- 15 April – Isle of Wight Radio
- 21 April – FTP
- 14 May – Buzz FM
- 21 May – South West Sound
- 1 June – Red Rose Gold
- 4 June –
  - Centre Sound
  - CityBeat
- 24 June – Chiltern Supergold
- 25 June –
  - Airport Information Radio
  - East End Radio
  - Spectrum Radio
- 9 July – Melody 105.4 FM
- 15 July –
  - Max AM
  - Touch AM
- 17 July – Magic 828
- 27 August – BBC Radio 5
- 28 August – Radio Harmony
- 1 September – Kiss FM
- 7 October – Mellow 1557
- October – Echo 96
- 5 November – Wear FM

== Programme debuts ==
- March – And Now in Colour on BBC Radio 4 (1990–1991)
- 3 April – Jazz Parade on BBC Radio 2 (1990–1993)
- 13 May – All the World's a Globe (National Theatre of Brent) on BBC Radio 3 (1990)
- 2 June – Flywheel, Shyster, and Flywheel on BBC Radio 4 (1990–1992)
- 20 August – The Moral Maze on BBC Radio 4 (1990–Present)
- 30 August – Formula Five on BBC Radio 5 (1990–1994)

== Continuing radio programmes ==
=== 1940s ===
- Sunday Half Hour (1940–2018)
- Desert Island Discs (1942–Present)
- Down Your Way (1946–1992)
- Letter from America (1946–2004)
- Woman's Hour (1946–Present)
- A Book at Bedtime (1949–Present)

=== 1950s ===
- The Archers (1950–Present)
- The Today Programme (1957–Present)
- Sing Something Simple (1959–2001)
- Your Hundred Best Tunes (1959–2007)

=== 1960s ===
- Farming Today (1960–Present)
- In Touch (1961–Present)
- The World at One (1965–Present)
- The Official Chart (1967–Present)
- Just a Minute (1967–Present)
- The Living World (1968–Present)
- The Organist Entertains (1969–2018)

=== 1970s ===
- PM (1970–Present)
- Start the Week (1970–Present)
- Week Ending (1970–1998)
- You and Yours (1970–Present)
- I'm Sorry I Haven't a Clue (1972–Present)
- Good Morning Scotland (1973–Present)
- Kaleidoscope (1973–1998)
- Newsbeat (1973–Present)
- The News Huddlines (1975–2001)
- File on 4 (1977–Present)
- Money Box (1977–Present)
- The News Quiz (1977–Present)
- Breakaway (1979–1998)
- Feedback (1979–Present)
- The Food Programme (1979–Present)
- Science in Action (1979–Present)

=== 1980s ===
- In Business (1983–Present)
- Sounds of the 60s (1983–Present)
- Loose Ends (1986–Present)
- Flying the Flag (1987–1992)
- Citizens (1987–1991)
- Top of the Pops (1988–1991)

== Ending this year ==
- December – The Mary Whitehouse Experience (1989–1990)

== Births ==
- 14 February – Jordan North, DJ

== Deaths ==
- 2 April – Peter Jones, sports commentator (born 1930)
- 1 June – Eric Barker, comic actor and writer (born 1912)
- 14 June – Elsie Waters, comedy performer (born 1893)
- 16 July – Sidney Torch, orchestral conductor and music broadcaster (Friday Night is Music Night) (born 1908)
- 9 October – Richard Murdoch, comic actor (born 1907)
- 9 December – Andrew Timothy, Anglican priest, previously BBC announcer (born 1912)

== See also ==
- 1990 in British music
- 1990 in British television
- 1990 in the United Kingdom
- List of British films of 1990
