= List of British films of 1990 =

A list of films produced in the United Kingdom in 1990 (see 1990 in film):

== 1990 ==
Title	Director	Cast	Genre	Notes
1990
1871	Ken McMullen			Screened at the 1990 Cannes Film Festival
American Dream	Barbara Kopple		Documentary	With the US - Academy Award for Documentary Feature win
The Big Man	David Leland	Kenny Ireland, Liam Neeson	Drama	
Blood Oath	Stephen Wallace	Bryan Brown, George Takei, Terry O'Quinn, John Polson, Nicholas Eadie, Toshi Shioya, Deborah Unger, Ray Barrett, Jason Donovan	Drama	
Bullseye!	Michael Winner	Michael Caine, Roger Moore	Comedy	
Chicago Joe and the Showgirl	Bernard Rose	Kiefer Sutherland, Emily Lloyd, Liz Fraser	Crime/drama	
The Children	Tony Palmer	Ben Kingsley, Kim Novak, Britt Ekland	Drama	
The Comfort of Strangers	Paul Schrader	Natasha Richardson, Christopher Walken	Drama	Screened at the 1990 Cannes Film Festival
Dances With Wolves	Kevin Costner	Kevin Costner, Mary McDonnell, Graham Greene, Rodney Grant	Epic western	
Dancin' Thru the Dark	Mike Ockrent	Ben Murphy, Con O'Neill	Comedy	
The Field	Jim Sheridan	Richard Harris, John Hurt	Drama	Co-production with the Republic of Ireland
The Fool	Christine Edzard	Derek Jacobi, Cyril Cusack	Drama	
Fools of Fortune	Pat O'Connor	Iain Glen, Julie Christie	Drama	
The Garden	Derek Jarman	Tilda Swinton, Johnny Mills	Drama	Co-production with Germany & Japan; Entered into the 17th Moscow International Film Festival
Hamlet	Franco Zeffirelli	Mel Gibson, Glenn Close	Drama	
Hardware	Richard Stanley	Dylan McDermott, Stacey Travis, John Lynch, William Hootkins, Iggy Pop	cyberpunk science fiction horror	
Hidden Agenda	Ken Loach	Frances McDormand, Brian Cox	Political thriller	Won the Jury Prize at Cannes
I Hired a Contract Killer	Aki Kaurismäki	Jean-Pierre Léaud, Margi Clarke	Drama	
Killing Dad	Michael Austin	Richard E. Grant, David Austin	Comedy	
The Krays	Peter Medak	Martin Kemp, Gary Kemp, Billie Whitelaw	Crime biopic	
Life is Sweet	Mike Leigh	Alison Steadman, Jim Broadbent, Jane Horrocks	Comedy drama	
Memphis Belle	Michael Caton-Jones	Matthew Modine, Eric Stoltz	World War II drama	
Mister Frost	Philippe Setbon	Jeff Goldblum, Alan Bates	Thriller	
Mr. & Mrs. Bridge	James Ivory	Paul Newman, Joanne Woodward, Blythe Danner, Simon Callow, Kyra Sedgwick, Robert Sean Leonard	Drama	British-American-Canadian co-production
Nightbreed	Clive Barker	Craig Sheffer, Anne Bobby, David Cronenberg, Charles Haid	Dark fantasy horror	
Nuns on the Run	Jonathan Lynn	Eric Idle, Robbie Coltrane,	Comedy	
Reversal of Fortune	Barbet Schroeder	Glenn Close, Jeremy Irons, Ron Silver	Drama	American-Japanese-British co-production
Rosencrantz & Guildenstern Are Dead	Tom Stoppard	Gary Oldman, Tim Roth, Richard Dreyfuss	Literary drama	
The Sheltering Sky	Bernardo Bertolucci	Debra Winger, John Malkovich	Drama	Co-production with Italy
Silent Scream	David Hayman	Iain Glen		Glen won the Silver Bear for Best Actor at Berlin.
State of Grace	Phil Joanou	Sean Penn, Ed Harris, Gary Oldman, Robin Wright, John Turturro	Neo-noir crime	
Treasure Island	Fraser Clarke Heston	Charlton Heston, Christian Bale, Oliver Reed	Adventure	
Truly, Madly, Deeply	Anthony Minghella	Juliet Stevenson, Alan Rickman	Fantasy romance	
Vroom	Beeban Kidron	Diana Quick, Clive Owen	Drama	
The Witches	Nicolas Roeg	Jasen Fisher, Anjelica Huston	Fantasy	

== See also ==
- 1990 in British music
- 1990 in British radio
- 1990 in British television
- 1990 in the United Kingdom
