= 1990 in British television =

This is a list of British television related events from 1990.

== Events ==
=== January ===
- 1 January
  - New Year's Day highlights on BBC1 include the network television premiere of the 1985 romantic drama Out of Africa, starring Robert Redford and Meryl Streep as well as the 1982 musical sequel Grease 2.
  - Debut of the iconic sitcom Mr. Bean on ITV, starring Rowan Atkinson as the titular character.
- 2 January
  - Granada's flagship nightly news programme Granada Reports is rebranded as Granada Tonight.
  - The first episode of the sixth T-Bag series airs in which Georgina Hale debuts as Tabatha Bag, the second T-Bag.
  - The 30-minute weekday 6am Ceefax slot returns to BBC1, but rather than the special pages used for Ceefax AM, the content is the same as for all other Ceefax broadcasts.
  - For the first time, Emmerdale is networked across almost all of ITV, airing at 7pm on Tuesdays and Thursdays.
- 3 January – The US animated series Teenage Mutant Hero Turtles makes its debut on BBC1. The show's original US title, Teenage Mutant Ninja Turtles, is changed for the UK because of controversy surrounding ninjas and related weapons such as nunchaku. The intro sequence is heavily edited because of this, replacing the word ninja with hero or fighting, using a digitally faded logo instead of the animated blob and removing any scenes in which the character Michelangelo wields his nunchaku. Scenes of Michelangelo using his nunchaku are likewise edited out of the episodes themselves, leading the American producers to drop the weapons from the series entirely, in order to make the show more appropriate for the international market.
- 4 January – Debut of the sitcom One Foot in the Grave on BBC1, starring Richard Wilson.
- 6 January
  - The US action drama series Baywatch, starring David Hasselhoff and Pamela Anderson, makes its UK debut on ITV. Made by NBC, the series proves popular with British viewers with audience figures regularly reaching 13 million. When NBC cancels the series after its first season, ITV teams up with an international consortium of broadcasters to sponsor the show for further seasons. The series comes to an end in 2001, following an eleven-year run.
  - Debut of Jekyll & Hyde on ITV, a made-for-television film starring Michael Caine and Cheryl Ladd.
- 8 January – The popular classic children's song Nellie the Elephant has been spawned into a five-minute animated cartoon series on ITV, featuring the voices of singer Lulu and Tony Robinson. The first episode is called Nellie and the Ghost and was shown every Monday until 9 April with the episode Nellie Rescues Mrs Maple's Moggy. The series will return on 5 September with Nellie Goes Ballooning and will be shifted onto a Wednesday timeslot. The last three episodes will be broadcast in January 1991 with the final one being shown on 21 January.
- 9 January – The Secret Cabaret, an innovative and shocking magic-based programme hosted by magician Simon Drake, makes its debut on Channel 4.
- 14 January – The Observer reports that TVS have started searching for a buyer for a 49% stake in US production company MTM Enterprises which it bought in 1988.
- 24 January–3 February – The BBC broadcasts the 1990 Commonwealth Games. BBC1 stays on the air all night to provide live coverage. This is the first time that BBC1 has provided full live coverage of an overseas Commonwealth Games with around 12 hours of live action broadcast each day.
- 27 January – The final episode of Bob's Full House is broadcast on BBC1.
- 31 January – The network television premiere of the James Bond film A View to a Kill on ITV, starring Roger Moore, Tanya Roberts, Patrick Macnee, Christopher Walken and Grace Jones.
- January
  - Chrysalis Television takes over the contract to produce LWT News.

=== February ===
- 2 February – The BBC Schools gay-themed television film Two of Us is given its first daytime showing on BBC2. It is shown in two parts, on consecutive Friday lunchtimes. The channel had previously shown the film late at night in March 1988.
- 5 February – Sky Movies is fully encrypted and becomes Sky's first pay channel.
- 11 February
  - Live coverage is aired of the African National Congress leader Nelson Mandela's release from Victor Verster Prison, near Cape Town, South Africa.
  - Sky Movies broadcasts its first special event, the boxing fight between Mike Tyson and Buster Douglas.
- 13 February – The US science-fiction series Quantum Leap makes its UK debut on BBC2, starring Scott Bakula and Dean Stockwell.
- 15 February – The hugely popular game show The Crystal Maze makes its debut on Channel 4, presented by Richard O'Brien.
- 19 February – The documentary series Cutting Edge makes its debut on Channel 4.
- 20 February – Steve McFadden makes his first appearance as the EastEnders character Phil Mitchell. Ross Kemp's debut as Phil's brother, Grant would air two days later.

=== March ===
- 4 March – The Observer newspaper reports that it has formed a partnership with Central to create Central Observer, making environmental themed films for British Satellite Broadcasting and other terrestrial channels with funding from the charity Television Trust for the Environment.
- 12 March
  - Ahead of the first free legislative election in the German Democratic Republic, BBC1 airs an edition of Panorama in which Fred Emery reports from the GDR and West Germany on the opportunities and strains facing the Germans.
  - The final episode of Blankety Blank presented by Les Dawson is broadcast on BBC1, the series is officially cancelled later in September, although it would return in 1997 with Lily Savage as its host.
- 20 March – Chancellor John Major delivers the first budget to be broadcast on television.
- 25 March – British Satellite Broadcasting launches on cable as a rival to Sky Television which launched the previous year. Its five BSB channels are launched one-by-one over the space of five days, with The Movie Channel being the first to go on air.
- 26 March
  - The science-fiction soap Jupiter Moon makes its debut on the Galaxy channel. 150 episodes are commissioned, but only 108 are aired before the series is cancelled in December following BSB's merger with Sky.
  - Debut of the game show Turnabout on BBC1, presented by Rob Curling.
- 27 March – BBC1 airs the first of two flashback episodes of EastEnders as part of a storyline in which Diane Butcher, played by Sophie Lawrence, ran away from home. The episodes show Frank Butcher (Mike Reid) going to meet his teenage daughter at King's Cross station after she contacted him following a three-month absence. Scenes showing Frank waiting for Diane and their subsequent reunion are interspersed with flashbacks to January showing her leaving home and living rough on the streets. Sophie Lawrence did research among real homeless people for the storyline.
- 28 March – ITV airs the Granada documentary drama Who Bombed Birmingham?. The programme, which looks at the 1974 Birmingham pub bombings and the conviction of the Birmingham Six, names several people believed to have actually been behind the bombings.
- 31 March – Opportunity Knocks returns to BBC1 for the 1990 series with its original title and with Les Dawson as host.

=== April ===
- 3 April – ITV airs the First Tuesday documentary Sonia's Baby, the story of a woman's fight with the medical establishment to have a test tube baby using her late husband's sperm.
- 6 April – The Australian children's science-fiction comedy Round the Twist makes its UK debut on BBC1.
- 10 April – The UK's first Asian TV channel TV Asia launches and becomes Europe's first entertainment and information channel for the South Asian community from the Indian subcontinent. It initially broadcasts through the night during Sky One's downtime.
- 14 April
  - BBC2 begins showing the 91-part 1988 Indian serial Mahabharat, a dramatisation of the epic poem the Mahabharata. The programme is shown in Hindi with English subtitles and is repeated the following day in a late-night slot on BBC1.
  - Debut of You've Been Framed! on ITV, presented by Jeremy Beadle.
- 16 April
  - BBC1 airs Nelson Mandela – an International Tribute, a concert held at Wembley Stadium in honour of Nelson Mandela. The concert features a number of prominent musicians, including Anita Baker, Tracy Chapman, Stanley Clarke, Natalie Cole, George Duke, Peter Gabriel and Patti LaBelle. Nelson Mandela himself is also in attendance.
  - BBC1 airs Wogan on Ice, a special edition of Terry Wogan's chat show that gives viewers a rare chance to see ice dancers Jayne Torvill and Christopher Dean performing together. The pair, who achieved success during the 1984 Winter Olympics, are appearing together in the UK for the first time since 1985.
- 17 April – The Channel Four Daily is revamped in a bid to attract more viewers. Some of the segments are changed and the programme starts 30 minutes later, at 6:30am.
- 19 April – Original airdate of a French and Saunders episode featuring the sketch "Modern Mother and Daughter", which forms the basis of the hugely popular sitcom Absolutely Fabulous that starts in 1992.
- 21 April
  - The BBC reverts to airing just one summer Saturday morning magazine show and replaces On the Waterfront and UP2U with a new show, The 8.15 from Manchester, named after its start time and broadcast location.
  - The final episode of You Bet! presented by Bruce Forsyth is broadcast on ITV.
- 29 April – British Satellite Broadcasting launches on satellite television.

=== May ===
- 5 May – Italy's Toto Cutugno wins the Eurovision Song Contest 1990 from Yugoslavia with "Insieme: 1992"; the programme is notable for a technical fault with Spain's entry from Azucar Moreno.
- 6 May – Original airdate of the Everyman episode A Game of Soldiers, a documentary which concerns a group of soldiers exploring their feelings about being trained to kill.
- 10 May – The Broadcasting Bill receives its third reading in the House of Commons and is passed with 259 votes to 180.
- 19 May – Helen Rollason becomes the first female presenter of BBC1's Grandstand.
- 22 May – ITV airs Trojan Horse, an episode of The Bill in which the character PC Ken Melvin, played by Mark Powley, is killed while trying to park a car when a bomb inside explodes.
- 25 May – The anarchic cult comedy series Vic Reeves Big Night Out makes its debut on Channel 4, starring Vic Reeves and Bob Mortimer.
- 27–28 May – ITV stages its second nationwide Telethon.
- 28 May – ITV airs a special edition of Coronation Street as part of its Telethon in which Hilda Ogden (Jean Alexander) returns for a special visit.

=== June ===
- 1 June – The game show The 64,000 Question makes its debut on ITV, presented by Bob Monkhouse.
- 2 June – The revived series of Opportunity Knocks ends its run on BBC1 after four series with the 1990 final which will be officially confirmed in September.
- 4 June – The government announces that the copyright on TV and radio listings will end on 1 March 1991 meaning that, from this date, any publication (including newspapers) will be able to publish 7-day listings, having previously been able to publish only the present day's listings (and two days on Saturdays).
- 8 June–8 July – The BBC and ITV provide television coverage of the 1990 FIFA World Cup.
- 15 June – The long-running children's arts and crafts series Art Attack makes its debut on Children's ITV, presented by Neil Buchanan.
- 16 June – Pages from Ceefax is shown after 10am for the final time and as from 19 June, BBC2 begins broadcasting programmes when Daytime on Two is not on the air at 10am rather than at lunchtime.
- 20 June – Archie Macpherson commentates his last football match for BBC Scotland with the Scotland v Brazil World Cup match in Italy which Brazil win 1–0 leaving Scotland eliminated from the finals. He is replaced by Jock Brown (who has commentated the same match on STV) as main commentator when Sportscene returns on 25 August. Brown is replaced by Gerry McNee for Scotsport which is shown the following day.
- 24 June – The network television premiere of James Cameron's 1984 science fiction film The Terminator, on BBC2 as part of the channel's Moviedrome strand, starring Arnold Schwarzenegger, Linda Hamilton, Michael Biehn and Lance Henriksen.
- 28 June – The sitcom Waiting for God makes its debut on BBC1, starring Stephanie Cole.

=== July ===
- 2 July
  - ITV airs Tom McGurk's film Dear Sarah, a play about Giuseppe Conlon's letters to his wife, Sarah, after he was convicted as one of the Maguire Seven for allegedly making IRA bombs.
  - Series 4 of The Cook Report began with Roger Cook returning to Spain's Costa Del Sol to investigate the growing drug trade.
  - The Channel 4 game show Countdown celebrates its 1000th edition.
  - Debut of the cookery competition MasterChef on BBC1, presented by Loyd Grossman.
- 5 July – The Tavernier family make their EastEnders debut with parents Celestine and Etta (played by Leroy Golding and Jacqui Gordon-Lawrence), their children, Clyde (Steven Woodcock), Hattie (Michelle Gayle) and Lloyd (Garey Bridges), and grandfather Jules (Tommy Eytle).
- 6 July
  - Channel 4 introduces a third weekly episode of its soap Brookside, airing on a Friday evening. It now airs on Mondays, Wednesdays and Fridays.
  - BBC1 concludes season 13 of Dallas with a 90 minute feature-length episode. It would be the last time the original series would be on a peak time slot as the final season next year would be shown on Sunday afternoons.
- 7 July
  - Hey, Hey, it's Saturday! replaces Wac '90 as TV-am's flagship Saturday morning children's programme.
  - In Rome, on the eve of the final of the 1990 FIFA World Cup, the Three Tenors sing together for the first time. The event is broadcast live on Channel 4. The main highlight is Luciano Pavarotti's performance of "Nessun Dorma" from Giacomo Puccini's opera Turandot. It will reach number two on the UK Singles Chart.
- 9 July – Anglia replaces its news programme About Anglia with Anglia News. It is a new dual news service with both editions broadcast from Norwich. Journalists are also based at seven regional newsrooms and a Westminster bureau. They also begin providing separate news services for the East and West of the Anglia region from that day.
- 13 July – The network television premiere of Michael Schultz's 1987 science-fiction adventure Timestalkers on BBC1, the film having been postponed from 25 June (this was due to a live 1990 FIFA World Cup match between Italy and Uruguay played on the 25 June that was shown live on BBC1).
- 19 July – MPs vote to make televised proceedings of the House of Commons a permanent feature.
- 21 July – Debut of Stars in Their Eyes on ITV, a series presented by Leslie Crowther in which members of the public impersonate their favourite singers.
- 23 July – That night's edition of The Cook Report saw Roger Cook investigate the Tainted Blood Scandal.
- 25 July – Final appearance of Jason Donovan as Scott Robinson in Neighbours shown on BBC1 14 months after the episode aired in Australia. He will return for the 2022 finale.
- 31 July – The final edition of Engineering Announcements is shown on Channel 4 at 5:45am.

=== August ===
- 9 August – Debut of the sitcom Drop the Dead Donkey on Channel 4.
- 16 August – With English clubs due to return to UEFA competition after the Heysel ban, the Football League approves a deal for ITV to show exclusive coverage of Manchester United and Aston Villa's European matches in the 1990–91 season.
- 18 August – BSB's second Marcopolo satellite is launched.
- 20 August – The final episode of Miami Vice, Freefall, is broadcast on BBC1.
- 24 August – Debut of The Word on Channel 4 hosted by Terry Christian and Amanda de Cadenet with the series being shown on at 6pm and repeated late night later on in the evening.
- 25 August – The first series of Stars in Their Eyes on ITV is won by Maxine Barrie, performing as Shirley Bassey.
- 30 August – Dannii Minogue makes her first appearance as Emma Jackson in Home and Away which today airs on ITV, a few days after the character made her final appearance in Australia.
- 31 August – The network television premiere of Miracles on BBC1, Jim Kouf's 1986 comedy starring Tom Conti and Teri Garr.

=== September ===
- 1 September — Sky Movies begins broadcasting 24 hours a day. Previously the channel had broadcast shopping programmes between 6am and 2pm.
- 2 September
  - The network television premiere of Heartsounds on BBC1, a film based on the autobiographical book by Martha Weinman Lear and stars James Garner and Mary Tyler Moore.
  - The long-running US animated series The Simpsons is broadcast in the UK for the first time, making its debut on Sky One. Call of the Simpsons is the first episode to be shown on Sky.
- 3 September – The children's series Rosie and Jim makes its debut on Children's ITV.
- 5 September – The new BBC building at White City opens.
- 7 September – After an eight-year absence, The Generation Game returns to BBC1 with Bruce Forsyth as its returning host and Rosemarie Ford as its hostess.
- 8 September
  - Ahead of the UK broadcast of the 1,000th episode of Neighbours, BBC1 airs Neighbours 1,000th Episode Celebration, a TV special produced by Australia's Network Ten which brought together past and present cast members to mark the occasion.
  - Debut of Unsolved Mysteries on Sky One. It uses a documentary format to profile real-life mysteries featuring re-enactments of unsolved crimes, conspiracy theories and unexplained paranormal phenomena.
- 9 September – As part of the Screen One series, BBC1 airs the groundbreaking comedy-drama Frankenstein's Baby which explores the subject of male pregnancy.
- 10 September – ThunderCats returns to BBC1 with the second half of the first series.
- 13 September – BBC1 airs the 1,000th episode of Neighbours which features a storyline in which the characters Des Clarke and Jane Harris, played by Paul Keane and Annie Jones, become engaged.
- 15 September
  - Raymond Baxter introduces BBC1's live coverage of the fly-past and parade at Buckingham Palace as the Royal Air Force marks the 50th anniversary of the Battle of Britain.
  - BBC2 screens Horror Cafe, a late-night horror themed special with film-makers and authors, such as John Carpenter, Clive Barker and Roger Corman telling scary stories. Followed by the George A. Romero film Martin the Vampire and Dr. Jekyll and Mr. Hyde, starring Spencer Tracy and Ingrid Bergman.
- 16 September – Cliff Michelmore introduces BBC1's coverage of the Battle of Britain Service from Westminster Abbey, conducted by the Archbishop of Canterbury the Most Rev. and Rt Hon. Dr Robert Runcie.
- 17 September – BBC1 airs a special edition of Blue Peter in which Yvette Fielding travels to Montserrat to report on efforts to rebuild the island which experienced widespread damage when it was struck by Hurricane Hugo on 17 September 1989.
- 23 September – Debut of the Screen One drama Sweet Nothing which deals with the subject of homeless young people in London.
- 24 September
  - Yorkshire Television launches a third sub-regional news opt-out for south Yorkshire and north Derbyshire called South and is broadcast from Sheffield while East (Hull) continues to air in east Yorkshire, Lincolnshire and north Norfolk and Calendar News is broadcast to the rest of the region, west and north Yorkshire.
  - Joan Bunting wins the 1990 series of MasterChef on BBC1.
- 25 September – The children's animated fantasy series The Dreamstone makes its debut on ITV.
- 26 September
  - Star Trek: The Next Generation makes its UK debut on BBC2, with the feature-length episode Encounter at Farpoint.
  - After a nine-year absence, the long-running children's series How is revived as How 2 on ITV, presented by Fred Dinenage, Carol Vorderman and Gareth Jones.
- 28 September – Debut of the panel game show Have I Got News For You on BBC2, presented by Angus Deayton.
- 30 September – The BSB channel Galaxy airs the pilot episode of Heil Honey I'm Home!, a controversial sitcom featuring a fictionalised Adolf Hitler and Eva Braun. The show attracts much criticism and is cancelled after one episode. Several other episodes were recorded, but none has ever been broadcast.

=== October ===
- 2 October – The First Tuesday documentary Swing Under the Swastika airs on ITV. The programme looks at jazz music under the Nazi regime and is narrated by Alan Plater.
- 3 October – The BBC Radio 1 comedy series The Mary Whitehouse Experience comes to television with a series on BBC2.
- 6 October – ITV screens the network television premiere of Tony Scott's blockbuster 1986 film Top Gun, starring Tom Cruise and Kelly McGillis.
- 7 October – Channel 4 premiers the Belgian animated series Bobobobs, while CBBC2 premieres Saban's Adventures of Pinocchio.
- 15 October
  - BBC1 launches a new weekday morning service called Daytime UK. Linked live from Birmingham and running for four hours, from 8:50am until lunchtime, the new service includes hourly regional news summaries, broadcast after the on-the-hour news bulletins.
  - Fireman Sam returns to BBC1 for a new series with a new character named Penny Morris.
- 18 October – That day's edition of BBC1's Question Time from Edinburgh becomes the first edition of the programme to feature six panellists after delays require the last-minute substitution of two guests. Tony Benn, Margaret Ewing, Andrew Neil and Malcolm Rifkind were originally scheduled to appear, but Menzies Campbell and Magnus Linklater are drafted in when Benn and Neil are late. They then arrive 20 minutes into the programme and join the discussion.
- 23 October – David Lynch's critically acclaimed serial drama Twin Peaks makes its UK debut at 9pm on BBC2.
- 29 October – Debut of the popular sitcom Keeping Up Appearances on BBC1, starring Patricia Routledge.
- 30 October – Debut of The Sentence, an eight-part BBC2 documentary series looking at life inside Glen Parva Young Offenders Institute near Leicester, Europe's largest prison of its type. It is the first time a television crew has been given access to the prison.

=== November ===
- 1 November – The Broadcasting Act 1990 receives Royal Assent. The Act paves the way for the deregulation of the British commercial broadcasting industry and will have many consequences for the ITV system. The Act also sets out the terms of a license for a fifth UK television channel which would need to be a general entertainment channel with a remit for some public service broadcasting. Additionally, it is estimated that the channel's coverage would reach only 74% of the UK and a video retuning operation would need to be undertaken.
- 2 November – BSB merges with Sky Television, becoming British Sky Broadcasting. Of BSB's five channels, only two, The Movie Channel and The Sports Channel, remain on the air long-term, though both are eventually renamed. Galaxy is closed with its transponders handed over to Sky One, Now is replaced in the most part with Sky News and The Power Station remains on the air until 8 April 1991 before being replaced with MTV.
- 8 November – The comedy sketch show Harry Enfield's Television Programme, later called Harry Enfield & Chums, makes its debut on BBC2. Harry Enfield, Paul Whitehouse and Kathy Burke star.
- 9 November – The Word is moved from 6pm to a late-night timeslot on Channel 4 with the show being repeated the following night.
- 11 November – At 10:40pm, ITV airs an ITN News special in which Trevor McDonald talks to Saddam Hussein. In his first interview with a British broadcaster since his country's invasion of Kuwait in August, the Iraqi President calls for talks and attempts to link the ongoing Gulf crisis with the Palestinian issue.
- 12 November – The British/Swiss children's series Pingu makes its debut on BBC1.
- 13 November – Geoffrey Howe makes a dramatic resignation speech in the House of Commons which will precipitate Margaret Thatcher's resignation as Prime Minister; this is the first significant speech to have been seen since television cameras were admitted to the House a year ago.
- 14 November – Tim Whitnall succeeds Tyler Butterworth as alien Angelo in the ITV children's sitcom Mike and Angelo.
- 18 November–23 December – The BBC's serialisation of The Chronicles of Narnia concludes with the fourth and final story, The Silver Chair, being aired in six parts.
- 20 November
  - The date of broadcaster John Sergeant's famous encounter with Margaret Thatcher on the steps of the British embassy in Paris. He was waiting for Thatcher in the hope of hearing her reaction to the first ballot in the party leadership contest of 1990, only to be pushed aside by her press secretary, Sir Bernard Ingham, when Thatcher emerges from the building. Sergeant later wins the British Press Guild award for the most memorable broadcast of the year.
  - BBC1 airs The Maze – Enemies Within, an Inside Story special looking at life inside Northern Ireland's Maze Prison.
  - On today's episode of Emmerdale, Malandra Burrows (as Kathy Merrick) sings "Just This Side of Love", a song that was released by Burrows as a single on 26 November. The song enters the UK Singles Chart at #44, before spending eight weeks in the top 60 and peaking at #11 on 22 December.
- 22 November – Following Margaret Thatcher's resignation as Prime Minister, this evening's edition of Question Time, broadcast from London's Barbican Centre, is transmitted in two parts, with two different panels. The first part features Enoch Powell, David Owen, James Callaghan and Simon Jenkins while Michael Howard, Nigel Lawson, Paddy Ashdown and Roy Hattersley are the panellists for the second part.
- 25 November
  - The final episode of Howards' Way is broadcast on BBC1.
  - The original airdate of episode three of the ninth series of Spitting Image which concludes with a film showing footage of Britain's homeless crisis over which plays a parody of Dionne Warwick's 1964 song "Walk on By". The piece is introduced as one of the legacies of Margaret Thatcher's government and is rare for the series in that no puppets were used.

=== December ===
- 1 December – With the media watching, the two ends of the service tunnel of the Channel Tunnel are joined together, linking Britain and France for the first time since the Ice Age. A handshake then takes place between Englishman Graham Fagg and Frenchman Phillippe Cozette, after which British and French workers board trains to complete the first journey between the two countries.
- 2 December
  - ITV airs a repeat of the first-ever episode of Coronation Street as the soap approaches its 30th anniversary.
  - Galaxy and Now are closed down and are replaced on the Marcopolo satellite by Sky One and Sky News, although arts programmes are shown for a short time as a weekend opt-out service from Sky News.
- 7 December – BBC2 airs Your Move, a pioneering interactive show in which the home audience are invited to play chess against grandmaster Jonathan Speelman using telephone voting to select each move.
- 9 December
  - Cilla Black hosts Happy Birthday Coronation Street, an evening of entertainment on ITV to celebrate the 30th anniversary of the long–running soap.
  - The Greek language channel Hellenic TV, the UK's first foreign-language service to be given a broadcast licence by the Independent Television Commission goes on the air in London.
- 15 December – Last edition of The Noel Edmonds Saturday Roadshow on BBC1. The programme was a slow-burning success since it began in 1988, and following this series, Edmonds' popularity and reputation were sufficiently re-established with the public for Edmonds to pitch Noel's House Party to the BBC, which began the following year.
- 16 December – The network television premiere of the 1984 comedy film The Muppets Take Manhattan on BBC1, the third feature-length film starring The Muppets.
- 22 December – BBC1 shows the network television premiere of the 1987 sci-fi comedy film Innerspace, starring Dennis Quaid and Martin Short.
- 24 December
  - BBC1 airs feature-length episode of All Creatures Great and Small, the last to be shown in the long-running series.
  - The first Wallace & Gromit film, A Grand Day Out, makes its debut on Channel 4. The film itself already had its premiere a year earlier at an animation festival in Bristol and features the voice of Peter Sallis as Wallace.
- 25 December
  - The network television premiere of Steven Spielberg's 1982 science-fiction blockbuster E.T. the Extra-Terrestrial on BBC1, starring Dee Wallace, Peter Coyote and Henry Thomas.
  - ITV shows the network television premiere of the 1987 action comedy sequel Beverly Hills Cop II, starring Eddie Murphy.
  - Channel 4 airs The Coronation Street Birthday Lecture, a talk delivered by Labour politician Roy Hattersley in which he discusses aspects of the soap in front of an invited audience which includes some Coronation Street cast members. The programme also includes some classic clips from the series.
- 26 December
  - Boxing Day highlights on ITV include the network television premieres of the 1987 romantic drama film Dirty Dancing, starring Patrick Swayze and Jennifer Grey and the 1985 children's fantasy film Return to Oz.
  - BBC1 shows the network television premiere of the 1986 supernatural horror film Poltergeist II: The Other Side, starring JoBeth Williams and Craig T. Nelson as well as Toto – Live in Paris, a rare live performance from Toto.
  - ITV airs a TV adaptation of R. D. Blackmore's historical romance Lorna Doone. The film, produced by Thames is noted for its choice of filming location, footage having been shot near Glasgow rather than in the novel's Exmoor setting.
- 27 December
  - BBC1 airs the first part of the Australian film Bushfire Moon. The second part is shown the following day.
  - The network television premiere of Jim Henson's 1982 fantasy adventure The Dark Crystal on BBC2.
  - The network television premiere of My Left Foot, Jim Sheridan's 1989 biopic of the writer Christy Brown on ITV, starring Daniel Day-Lewis.
- 31 December – New Year's Eve highlights on BBC1 include the network television premiere of the 1987 romantic comedy Roxanne, a modern retelling of Edmond Rostand's 1897 verse play Cyrano de Bergerac, starring Steve Martin and Daryl Hannah.

== Debuts ==
=== BBC1 ===
- 3 January –
  - Teenage Mutant Hero Turtles (1987–1996)
  - Mick and Mac (1990)
- 4 January –
  - Alfonso Bonzo (1990)
  - One Foot in the Grave (1990–2000)
- 6 January – Waterfront Beat (1990–1991)
- 8 January – The Further Adventures of SuperTed (1989)
- 15 February
  - Ben Elton: The Man from Auntie (1990–1994)
  - Dizzy Heights (1990–1993)
- 26 March – Turnabout (1990–1996)
- 6 April – Round the Twist (1990, 1992, 2000–2001)
- 21 April – The 8:15 from Manchester (1990–1991)
- 26 May – Takeover Bid (1990–1991)
- 29 May – Chain (1990)
- 28 June – Waiting for God (1990–1994)
- 2 July – MasterChef (1990–2001, 2005–present)
- 4 September – On the Up (1990–1992)
- 14 September – Bump (1990–1994)
- 22 September – Babar (1989–1991)
- 3 October
  - Canned Carrott (1990–1992)
  - The Trials of Life (1990)
- 4 October – Uncle Jack (1990–1993)
- 11 October – Your Cheatin' Heart (1990)
- 28 October – The Green Man (1990)
- 29 October – Keeping Up Appearances (1990–1995)
- 12 November – Pingu (1986–2000, 2004–2006)
- 13 November – Forget Me Not Farm (1990–1991)
- 18 November
  - The Silver Chair (1990)
  - House of Cards (1990)
- 23 December – The Inspector Alleyn Mysteries (1990–1994)

=== BBC2 ===
- 10 January – Oranges Are Not the Only Fruit (1990)
- 13 February – Quantum Leap (1989–1993)
- 21 March – Never Come Back (1990)
- 6 April – United (1990)
- 20 May – The March (1990)
- 19 September – Portrait of a Marriage (1990)
- 26 September – Star Trek: The Next Generation (1987–1994)
- 27 September – Rab C. Nesbitt (1990–2014)
- 28 September – Have I Got News for You (1990–present)
- 3 October – The Mary Whitehouse Experience (1990–1992)
- 7 October – Saban's Adventures of Pinocchio (1972–1973)
- 13 October – The Littl' Bits (1980)
- 23 October – Twin Peaks (1990–1991, 2017)
- 24 October – Blood Rights (1990)
- 8 November – Harry Enfield's Television Programme (1990–1998)
- 14 November – Die Kinder (1990)
- 22 November – Nicholas Craig Masterclass (1990–1992)

=== ITV ===
- 1 January – Mr. Bean (1990–1995)
- 5 January – Stolen (1990)
- 6 January
  - Jekyll & Hyde (1990)
  - Baywatch (1989–2001)
- 7 January – Rescue (1990)
- 8 January – Nellie the Elephant (1990–1991)
- 10 January – Wowser (1989)
- 13 January – Yellowthread Street (1990)
- 20 January – Kappatoo (1990–1992)
- 21 January – Tarrant on TV (1990–2006)
- 27 January – Haggard (1990–1992)
- 7 February
  - El C.I.D. (1990–1992)
  - No Job for a Lady (1990–1992)
- 21 February – Spatz (1990–1992)
- 6 March – Chancer (1990–1991)
- 22 March – TECX (1990)
- 25 March – Not with a Bang (1990)
- 26 March – What-a-Mess (1979–1980, 1990)
- 5 April – Video View (1990–1992)
- 14 April – You've Been Framed! (1990–2022)
- 20 April – The Chief (1990–1995)
- 22 April
  - Jeeves and Wooster (1990–1993)
  - Perfect Scoundrels (1990–1992)
- 23 April – Families (1990–1993)
- 1 May – The Upper Hand (1990–1996)
- 2 May – Up the Garden Path (1990–1993)
- 12 May – Wayne Dobson – A Kind of Magic (1990–1992)
- 19 May – Cannon and Ball's Casino (1990)
- 30 May – Missing Persons (1990)
- 1 June – The $64,000 Question (1990–1993)
- 3 June – Shoot to Kill (1990)
- 15 June – Art Attack (1990–2007)
- 9 July – ITV News Anglia (1990–present)
- 21 July – Stars in Their Eyes (1990–2006, 2015)
- 24 July – Made in Heaven (1990)
- 25 July – Cluedo (1990–1993)
- 1 September – The New Adventures of Black Beauty (1990–1993)
- 3 September – Rosie and Jim (1990–2000)
- 6 September – Emlyn's Moon (1990)
- 7 September – The Piglet Files (1990–1992)
- 21 September – Paddington Bear (1989–1990)
- 24 September – Cannon and Balls Playhouse (1990)
- 25 September – The Dreamstone (1990–1995)
- 26 September – How 2 (1990–2006)
- 9 October – She-Wolf of London (1990–1991)
- 26 October – Coasting (1990)
- 14 November – Medics (1990–1995)
- 22 November – Sea Dragon (1990)
- 25 November – Come Home, Charlie, and Face Them (1990)
- 26 December – Lorna Doone (1990)
- 28 December – Father Dowling Mysteries (1987–1991)
- 29 December – The Widowmaker (1990)

=== Channel 4 ===
- 2 January – Gophers! (1990)
- 9 January – The Secret Cabaret (1990–1992)
- 2 February – The Great Moghuls (1990)
- 14 February – Boom! (1990–1991)
- 15 February – The Crystal Maze (1990–1995, 2016–2020)
- 19 February – Cutting Edge (1990–2017)
- 27 February – Nightingales (1990–1993)
- 27 March – Oh, Mr. Toad (1990)
- 5 May – Bright Sparks (1989)
- 10 May – My Two Dads (1987–1990)
- 25 May – Vic Reeves Big Night Out (1990–1991)
- 4 June – Don't Quote Me (1990)
- 12 June – Set of Six (1990)
- 27 June – The Gravy Train (1990)
- 14 July – Elly & Jools (1990)
- 29 July – A TV Dante (1990)
- 9 August – Drop the Dead Donkey (1990–1998)
- 10 August – The Word (1990–1995)
- 7 October – Bobobobs (1988–1989)
- 8 October – Centrepoint (1990)
- 24 December – A Grand Day Out (1989)
- Unknown
  - Nocturne (1990)
  - Hero Hungry (1990)
  - M.A.S.K. (1985–1986)

=== S4C ===
- 17 September – Heno (1990–2003, 2012–present)

=== Sky One ===
- 2 September – The Simpsons (1989–present) (Repeated on BBC1 & BBC2 from 1996–2004 and Channel 4 & E4 from 2004–present)
- 3 September – Love at First Sight (1990–1992)
- 8 September – Unsolved Mysteries (1987–2002, 2008–2010, 2020)
- 3 October – Alien Nation (1989–1990)

== Channels ==
=== New channels ===
Date	Channel
25 March	The Movie Channel
26 March	Galaxy
27 March	The Sports Channel
28 March	Now
29 March	The Power Station
10 April	TV Asia
28 June	The Computer Channel

=== Defunct channels ===
Date	Channel
29 November	The Computer Channel
1 December	Now
2 December	Galaxy

=== Rebranded channels ===
Date	Old Name	New Name
11 February	Sky Movies	Sky Movies Plus

== Continuing television shows ==
=== 1920s ===
- BBC Wimbledon (1927–1939, 1946–2019, 2021–present)

=== 1930s ===
- Trooping the Colour (1937–1939, 1946–2019, 2023–present)
- The Boat Race (1938–1939, 1946–2019, 2021–present)
- BBC Cricket (1939, 1946–1999, 2020–2024)

=== 1940s ===
- Come Dancing (1949–1998)

=== 1950s ===
- What's My Line? (1951–1964, 1984–1996)
- Panorama (1953–present)
- What the Papers Say (1956–2008)
- The Sky at Night (1957–present)
- Blue Peter (1958–present)
- Grandstand (1958–2007)

=== 1960s ===
- Coronation Street (1960–present)
- Songs of Praise (1961–present)
- Doctor Who (1963–1989, 1996, 2005–present)
- World in Action (1963–1998)
- Top of the Pops (1964–2006)
- Match of the Day (1964–present)
- Crossroads (1964–1988, 2001–2003)
- Play School (1964–1988)
- Mr. and Mrs. (1965–1999)
- World of Sport (1965–1985)
- Jackanory (1965–1996, 2006)
- Sportsnight (1965–1997)
- Call My Bluff (1965–2005)
- The Money Programme (1966–2010)
- Reksio (1967–1990)
- The Big Match (1968–2002)

=== 1970s ===
- The Old Grey Whistle Test (1971–1987)
- The Two Ronnies (1971–1987, 1991, 1996, 2005)
- Pebble Mill at One (1972–1986)
- Rainbow (1972–1992, 1994–1997)
- Emmerdale (1972–present)
- Newsround (1972–present)
- Weekend World (1972–1988)
- We Are the Champions (1973–1987)
- Last of the Summer Wine (1973–2010)
- That's Life! (1973–1994)
- Wish You Were Here...? (1974–2003)
- Arena (1975–present)
- Jim'll Fix It (1975–1994)
- One Man and His Dog (1976–present)
- 3-2-1 (1978–1988)
- Grange Hill (1978–2008)
- Ski Sunday (1978–present)
- Terry and June (1979–1987)
- The Book Tower (1979–1989)
- Blankety Blank (1979–1990, 1997–2002)
- The Paul Daniels Magic Show (1979–1994)
- Antiques Roadshow (1979–present)
- Question Time (1979–present)

=== 1980s ===
- Play Your Cards Right (1980–1987, 1994–1999, 2002–2003)
- Family Fortunes (1980–2002, 2006–2015, 2020–present)
- Juliet Bravo (1980–1985)
- Cockleshell Bay (1980–1986)
- Children in Need (1980–present)
- Finders Keepers (1981–1985)
- Freetime (1981–1985)
- Game for a Laugh (1981–1985)
- Tenko (1981–1985)
- That's My Boy (1981–1986)
- Razzamatazz (1981–1987)
- Bergerac (1981–1991)
- Odd One Out (1982–1985)
- On Safari (1982–1985)
- 'Allo 'Allo! (1982–1992)
- Wogan (1982–1992)
- Saturday Superstore (1982–1987)
- The Tube (1982–1987)
- Brookside (1982–2003)
- Countdown (1982–present)
- Let's Pretend (TV series) (1982–1988)
- No. 73 (1982–1988)
- Timewatch (1982–present)
- Right to Reply (1982–2001)
- Up the Elephant and Round the Castle (1983–1985)
- Inspector Gadget (1983–1986)
- Bananaman (1983–1986)
- Just Good Friends (1983–1986)
- Philip Marlowe, Private Eye (1983–1986)
- Breadwinners (1983–1986)
- Breakfast Time (1983–1989)
- Dramarama (1983–1989)
- Don't Wait Up (1983–1990)
- Good Morning Britain (1983–1992)
- First Tuesday (1983–1993)
- Highway (1983–1993)
- Blockbusters (1983–93, 1994–95, 1997, 2000–01, 2012, 2019)
- The New Statesman (1987–1994)
- The Cook Report (1987–1999)

== Ending this year ==
- 19 January – Home to Roost (1985–1990)
- 6 February – Greenclaws (1989–1990)
- 27 January – Bob's Full House (1984–1990)
- 16 February – Colin's Sandwich (1988–1990)
- 12 March – Blankety Blank (1979–1990, 1997–2002)
- 16 March – Campion (1989–1990)
- 25 March – Don't Wait Up (1983–1990)
- 9 April – The Labours of Erica (1989–1990)
- 2 June – Opportunity Knocks (1956–1978, 1987–1990)
- 22 June – South of the Border (1988–1990)
- 6 July – Connections (1985–1990)
- 28 July – The Trap Door (1986–1990)
- 14 August – Made in Heaven (1990)
- 15 August – TECX (1990)
- 19 August – A Kind of Living (1988–1990)
- 22 August – Fraggle Rock (1984–1990)
- 19 September – The Best of Magic (1989–1990)
- 1 October – Penny Crayon (1989–1990)
- 7 November – Blood Rights (1990)
- 25 November
  - Juke Box Jury (1959–1967, 1979, 1989–1990)
  - Howards' Way (1985–1990)
- 27 November – The Paradise Club (1989–1990)
- 7 December – Coasting (1990)
- 9 December – Come Home, Charlie, and Face Them (1990)
- 11 December – Huxley Pig (1989–1990)
- 13 December – The Brollys (1990)
- 15 December – The Noel Edmonds Saturday Roadshow (1988–1990)
- 19 December – Die Kinder (1990)
- 24 December – All Creatures Great and Small (1978–1990, 2020–present)
- Unknown –
  - Coconuts (1990)
  - Reksio (1967–1990)

== Births ==
- 1 March – Harry Eden, actor
- 16 May – Thomas Brodie-Sangster, actor
- 18 June – Jacob Anderson, actor
- 24 June – Rosie Jones, comedian
- 29 July – Joey Essex, reality TV personality
- 17 October – Scarlett Moffatt, TV presenter

== Deaths ==
Date	Name	Age	Cinematic Credibility
8 January	Terry-Thomas	78	actor
14 January	Gordon Jackson	66	actor (Upstairs, Downstairs, The Professionals)
23 January	Derek Royle	61	actor
8 April	Doreen Sloane	56	actress (Coronation Street, Emmerdale, Brookside)
2 May	David Rappaport	38	actor (Time Bandits, The Wizard)
21 May	Max Wall	82	comedian and actor
15 June	Raymond Huntley	86	actor (Upstairs, Downstairs)
30 June	Lynne Carol	76	actress (Coronation Street)
14 July	Philip Leacock	72	television director
16 July	Sidney Torch	82	theme tune composer
2 August	Edwin Richfield	68	actor
17 August	Graham Williams	45	television producer
7 September	A. J. P. Taylor	84	historian and television presenter
12 September	Athene Seyler	101	actress
4 October	Alyn Ainsworth	66	musical director (Fifty Years of Music, Lena Zavaroni and Music)
4 October	Jill Bennett	58	actress
4 October	Avis Bunnage	67	actress
3 November	Valerie French	62	actress
14 November	Malcolm Muggeridge	87	journalist, author and media personality
15 November	Jill Day	59	actress (The Jill Day Show)
19 December	Basil Henson	72	actor

== See also ==
- 1990 in British music
- 1990 in British radio
- 1990 in the United Kingdom
- List of British films of 1990
