= 1990 in the United Kingdom =

Events from the year 1990 in the United Kingdom.

== Incumbents ==
- Monarch – Elizabeth II
- Prime Minister – Margaret Thatcher (Conservative) (until 28 November), John Major (Conservative) (starting 28 November)

== Events ==
=== January ===
- 1 January
  - Glasgow begins its year as European Capital of Culture, the first designated in the British Isles.
  - Television debut of Rowan Atkinson's Mr. Bean in a Thames Television special.
- 4 January – Premiere of the BBC One television comedy One Foot in the Grave, which stars Richard Wilson and Annette Crosbie.
- 13 January – Some 50,000 people demonstrate on the streets of London in support of Britain's ambulance workers, as the ongoing ambulance crew strike continues four months after it began.
- 18 January – The first MORI poll of the decade shows that Labour have a 12-point lead over the Conservatives with 48% of the vote. Liberal support is at its lowest for more than a decade as the Liberal Democrats gain just 5% of the vote.
- 19 January – Police in Johannesburg, South Africa, break up a demonstration against the cricket match played by rebel English cricketers led by Mike Gatting.
- 25 January – Burns' Day Storm: hurricane-force winds are reported to have killed 39 people in England and Wales.
- 29 January – Lord Justice Taylor publishes his report in the Hillsborough disaster, which claimed the lives of 95 Liverpool F.C. supporters on 15 April last year. He recommends that all top division stadiums are all-seater by 1994 and that the rest of the Football League follows suit by 1999, but rules out the government's proposed ID card scheme to combat football hooliganism as "unworkable".

=== February ===
- 9 February – Ayatollah Khamenei of Iran renews his predecessors' fatwa on British author Salman Rushdie, which was imposed last year following controversy over the author's book: The Satanic Verses.
- 15 February
  - The UK and Argentina restore diplomatic relations after eight years. Diplomatic ties were broken off in response to Argentina's invasion of the Falkland Islands in 1982.
  - Neil Kinnock's dream of being prime minister appears closer to becoming reality as the latest MORI poll shows Labour on 51% with a 17-point lead over the Conservatives.
- 20 February – Three people are injured in Leicester city centre by a bomb explosion.
- 26 February – Fourteen people are killed as storms hit Britain. One of the worst-hit areas is Towyn in North Wales, where approximately 2,000 people are evacuated from their homes after huge waves smash a 200-yard hole in the sea wall and cause a major flood.
- 27 February – Economists warn that house prices could fall by up to 10% this year.

=== March ===
- 1 March – The Official Secrets Act 1989 comes into force.
- 7 March – Halifax Building Society reveals that house prices rose by 0.3% last month – the first monthly rise since July last year.
- 9 March – 37 people are arrested and 10 police officers injured in Brixton, London, during rioting against the new Community Charge.
- 13 March – The ambulance crew dispute ends after six months when workers agree to a 17.6% pay rise.
- 15 March
  - Iraq hangs British journalist Farzad Bazoft for spying. Daphne Parish, a British nurse, is sentenced to fifteen years in prison for being an accomplice to Mr Bazoft.
  - Britain's unemployment is now down to 1,610,000 – the lowest since 1978. However, it is a drop of just 2,000 on January's total and economists fear that a sharp rise in unemployment could soon begin as there are widespread fears of a recession.
- 20 March – Chancellor John Major delivers the first budget to be broadcast on television.
- 23 March – The Duke and Duchess of York's second daughter, Princess Eugenie of York, is born.
- 31 March – Poll tax riots in London as 200,000 people protest in the week preceding official introduction of the Community Charge.

=== April ===
- 1–25 April – 1990 Strangeways Prison riot in Manchester.
- 2 April – An earthquake measuring 5.1 on the Richter scale and centred on the Shropshire town of Bishop's Castle is felt throughout much of England and Wales.
- 4 April – Dr Raymond Crockett is struck off the medical register for using kidneys from Turkish immigrants who had been paid to donate them.
- 5 April – Aldi, a German discount food supermarket chain, opens its first store in Britain, in Stechford, Birmingham.
- 9 April – Four Ulster Defence Regiment soldiers are killed by an IRA bomb in County Down.
- 10 April – With nineteen inmates at Strangeways Prison in Manchester still staging a rooftop protest against prison conditions, rioting has broken out at prisons in Cardiff and Bristol.
- 11 April – Customs and Excise officers seize parts of an Iraqi supergun in Middlesbrough.
- 19 April – Labour have a 23-point lead over the Conservatives in the latest MORI poll.
- 29 April – Stephen Hendry, 21, becomes the youngest ever world snooker champion.

=== May ===
- May – Rover Group launches a new version of its popular Metro supermini, now branded as a Rover which has been the best-selling BL/Austin Rover car since its 1980 launch. At the same time, Vauxhall launches the Calibra, built by Opel in Germany, onto the UK market.
- 3 May – The end of house price inflation is declared by Halifax Building Society, two years after the housing market peaked.
- 4 May – Local council elections see Labour win more local council seats than the Conservatives. Neil Kinnock's hopes of victory in the next general election are further boosted by the fact that Labour have finished ahead in most of opinion polls for the last 12 months.
- 7 May – The Prince and Princess of Wales (Charles and Diana) travel to Budapest for the first postwar British royal visit there.
- 8 May – Billy Cartman, a 33-year-old grouter, becomes the sixth Briton to die in the construction of the Channel Tunnel when he is crushed by heavy machinery.
- 11 May – Inflation now stands at 9.4% – the highest level for eight years.
- 12 May – The final of the FA Cup ends in a 3–3 draw between Manchester United and Crystal Palace at Wembley Stadium.
- 17 May – Manchester United win the FA Cup final replay 1–0 at Wembley Stadium, with the only goal of the game being scored by defender Lee Martin. Manchester United have now won the FA Cup seven times, equalling the record already held by Aston Villa and Tottenham Hotspur.
- 19 May
  - British agriculture Minister John Gummer publicly feeds a hamburger to his five-year-old daughter to counter rumours about the spread of Bovine spongiform encephalopathy and its transmission to humans.
  - Unemployment is reported to have risen for the first time in nearly four years.
- 24 May
  - Bobby Robson announces that he will not be renewing his contract as manager of the England national football team after the World Cup in Italy this summer.
  - A by-election in Bootle is held, caused by the death of the sitting Labour MP Allan Roberts of cancer aged 46 on 21 March. The seat is retained for Labour by 43-year-old Michael Carr, but, unbeknownst to the people, he is in poor health and will die on 20 July. The "rump" Social Democratic Party (consisting of members who backed out of the merger with the Liberal Party which formed the Liberal Democrats two years ago) finishes behind the Monster Raving Loony Party in the by-election.
- 30 May – France prohibits British beef and live cattle imports as a precaution against fears of BSE being spread.

=== June ===
- 1 June – An army recruit is shot dead and two others are wounded by two suspected IRA gunmen in Lichfield, Staffordshire.
- 2 June – The long-serving actor Sir Rex Harrison dies of cancer aged 82 at his home in Manhattan, New York City.
- 3 June – The "rump" Social Democratic Party is wound up, two years after a splinter group refused to join up in the merger with the Liberal Democrats.
- 7 June – France, Italy and West Germany lift bans on British beef imposed during the BSE outbreak.
- 14 June
  - The proposed high-speed rail link between London and the Channel Tunnel is shelved.
  - Unemployment rises for the second month running, though by just over 4,000 to a total of 1,611,000 in May.
- 20 June – Chancellor of the Exchequer John Major proposes the "hard ecu", a currency which would circulate into parallel with national currencies as an alternative to full monetary union.
- 26 June – The Carlton Club in central London is bombed by the IRA, killing one and injuring 20.

=== July ===
- 2 July – Girobank is privatised by sale to the Alliance & Leicester Group.
- 4 July – England's hopes of World Cup glory are ended by a penalty shootout defeat in the semi-final against West Germany after a 1–1 draw in Turin.
- 10 July
  - The first Hampton Court Palace Flower Show is opened by Princess Anne.
  - UEFA lifts the ban on English football clubs in European competitions, five years after all teams were excluded due to the Heysel disaster.
- 11 July – Labour MP's accuse the Conservative government of "fraud" amid allegations that the 1,600,000 fall in unemployment since 1986 includes a million people leaving the list without finding work.
- 14 July – Trade and Industry Secretary Nicholas Ridley resigns following an interview in The Spectator in which he likened the European Community to Hitler's Germany.
- 16 July
  - An official report reveals that High Street sales are at their lowest since 1980, sparking further fears of a recession.
  - Nigel Mansell, Britain's most successful racing driver of the last 10 years, announces that he is to retire from Grand Prix races at the end of the 1990 season.
  - Graham Taylor, the manager of Aston Villa F.C., is appointed as the England team's new manager.
- 17 July – German food superstore chain Aldi opens its first British store in Birmingham and plans to have up to 200 stores across the country by 1993.
- 19 July – Saddam Hussein, dictator of Iraq, frees Daphne Parish from prison for "humanitarian reasons" and she returns to Britain.
- 20 July
  - An IRA bomb explodes at Stock Exchange Tower, the base of the London Stock Exchange.
  - Michael Carr, the newly-elected Labour MP for Bootle, dies after just 57 days in parliament from a heart attack at the age of 43.
- 24 July – A Roman Catholic nun and three police officers are killed by an IRA landmine in County Armagh.
- 30 July – An IRA car bomb kills British MP Ian Gow, a staunch unionist, six days after he assured the IRA that the British government would never surrender to them.
- 31 July – The England cricket team defeats the India national cricket team in a high-scoring Lord's test match totalling 1,603 runs.

=== August ===
- 1 August – British Airways Flight 149 is seized by the Iraqi Army at Kuwait International Airport following the Iraqi invasion of Kuwait.
- 3 August – The 1990 heat wave peaks with a temperature of 37.1 °C (98.8 °F) recorded at Cheltenham, Gloucestershire.
- 5 August – Margaret Thatcher announces her desire for a new Magna Carta to guarantee basic rights for all European citizens.
- 14 August – A survey carried out by the BBC reveals that 20% of taxpayers in England and Wales had not paid their Community Charge by 30 June this year.
- 16 August – A MORI poll shows that Labour now has a 15-point lead over the Conservatives with 50% of the vote, while support for the Liberal Democrats has doubled to 10% over the last seven months.
- 22 August – James MacMillan's symphonic piece The Confession of Isobel Gowdie premieres at The Proms in London.
- 23 August
  - British hostages in Iraq are paraded on TV.
  - Ford launches the fifth generation of its Escort hatchback, estate and cabriolet and Orion saloon. The two models have combined sales figures which account more than 10% of new cars sold in Britain. Sales of the two new models begin in Britain and the rest of Europe next month. However, the new generation models are widely panned by the motoring press due to their bland styling and driving experience as well as an old engine range from their predecessors.
- 24 August – Irish hostage Brian Keenan is released in Beirut, Lebanon, after being held a hostage there for more than four years.
- 27 August
  - Four investors are found guilty in the Guinness share-trading fraud trial.
  - The BBC begins broadcasting on Radio 5, its first new station for 23 years.

=== September ===
- September – The new Ford Escort and Orion go on sale, as does a new model from Nissan, the Primera which replaces the Bluebird and is produced in Sunderland.
- 3 September – The children's series Rosie and Jim debuts on Children's ITV.
- 8 September – Historian, author and broadcaster A. J. P. Taylor, 84, dies from Parkinson's disease in a London nursing home.
- 8 September – York City footballer David Longhurst, 25, collapses and dies during a Football League Fourth Division match.
- 10 September – Pegasus, a leading British travel operator, goes bankrupt.
- 18 September – Air Chief Marshal Sir Peter Terry survives a murder attempt by IRA terrorists at his home near Stafford.
- 22 September – John Banham, Director General of the Confederation of British Industry, warns that most of Britain is now affected by a recession and that there is worse to come. The latest CBI prediction is also the gloomiest since 1980, the last time Britain was in recession. Fears of a recession have been growing across most of the world since the autumn of last year. However, chancellor John Major denies that Britain is on the verge of a recession.
- 26 September – Margaret Thatcher joins in with the politicians who are denying that the British economy is slumping into recession, despite manufacturers reporting their biggest drop in output since 1982, as well as a growing number of bankruptcies.
- 27 September – The Knowsley South by-election, caused by the death of sitting Labour MP Sean Hughes on 25 June, takes place; Edward O'Hara holds the seat for Labour.

=== October ===
- 2 October – Neil Kinnock cites education and training as key areas needing an improvement in standards when he addresses his party's conference in Blackpool.
- 8 October
  - Pound sterling joins the European Exchange Rate Mechanism.
  - First members of the Women's Royal Naval Service to serve officially on an operational warship board Type 22 frigate HMS Brilliant.
- 18 October – The Eastbourne by-election in East Sussex takes place, sparked by Conservative MP Ian Gow's murder by the IRA on 30 July. David Bellotti of the Liberal Democrats wins the "safe" Conservative seat.
- 23 October
  - Treasury officials state that a "brief, technical" recession in the British economy is now inevitable.
  - Edward Heath, the former British prime minister, leaves Baghdad on a plane bound for Heathrow Airport with 33 freed hostages. Saddam Hussein has promised to release a further 30 hostages in the near future.
- 27 October – Economists predict that the current economic downturn will be confined to the second half of this year.
- 29 October – Premiere of the BBC One television comedy Keeping Up Appearances, which stars Patricia Routledge, Clive Swift and Geoffrey Hughes.
- 30 October – Fashion-based business Polly Peck enters administration following an investigation by the Serious Fraud Office. The CEO, Asil Nadir, is much later sentenced to imprisonment for theft in connection with the company's affairs.

=== November ===
- November
  - Government produces Planning Policy Guidance 16: Archaeology and Planning to advise local authorities on the treatment of archaeology within the planning process. Site developers are required to contract with archaeological teams to have sites investigated in advance of development.
  - Neil Kinnock, who has been leader of the Labour Party since October 1983, is now the longest serving opposition leader in British political history.
- 1 November
  - Geoffrey Howe, Deputy Prime Minister, resigns over the government's European policy.
  - Broadcasting Act makes bidding for independent television franchises more commercially based and relaxes regulation of television and radio broadcasting.
  - Courts and Legal Services Act introduces major reforms of the legal profession and Courts of England and Wales.
  - Employment Act prohibits the closed shop and solidarity action in industrial disputes.
- 2 November
  - Neil Kinnock announces his support for the adoption of a single European currency.
  - British Sky Broadcasting (BSkyB) founded as a merger between Sky Television and British Satellite Broadcasting.
- 8 November – By-elections are held in Bootle (for the second time this year) and Bradford North, caused by the respective deaths of Labour MPs Michael Carr on 20 July and Pat Wall on 30 August. Labour retain both seats, with new Bootle MP Joe Benton gaining nearly 80% of the votes, while in Bradford North Terry Rooney becomes the first Latter-day Saint MP.
- 12 November – The Football Association deducts Arsenal two points and Manchester United one point and fines both clubs £50,000 for a mass player brawl in a Football League match between the two clubs last month in a league match at Old Trafford.
- 13 November – Geoffrey Howe makes a dramatic resignation speech in the House of Commons, attacking the Prime Minister, Margaret Thatcher's hostility towards the EC.
- 14 November
  - The CBI confirms that the whole of Britain is now in recession, with every region now reporting a fall in output.
  - Former cabinet minister Michael Heseltine announces that he will challenge Margaret Thatcher's leadership.
- 15 November – Despite constant disputes in the government and widespread doubt over Thatcher's position as prime minister and party leader, combined with recent by-election defeats and anger over the poll tax, the Conservatives have cut Labour's lead in the opinion polls to four points as they gain 41% of the vote in the latest MORI poll.
- 19 November – Major job cuts are reported to be on the way at the Rover Group, Britain's largest independent carmaker.
- 20 November – Margaret Thatcher fails to win outright victory in a leadership contest for the Conservative Party.
- 22 November – Margaret Thatcher announces her resignation as Leader of the Conservative Party and therefore as Prime Minister, having led the government for more than 11 years and the Conservative Party for over 15 years. She is the longest serving prime minister of the 20th century.
- 23 November – The best-selling children's author Roald Dahl dies of cancer aged 74 in Oxford.
- 26 November – Plastic surgeons Michael Masser and Kenneth Paton are murdered in Wakefield, West Yorkshire.
- 27 November – John Major is elected leader of the Conservative Party and becomes Britain's new prime minister, defeating Douglas Hurd and Michael Heseltine. At 47, Major will be the youngest British Prime Minister of the 20th century until 1997. He is to be officially appointed prime minister tomorrow at Buckingham Palace.
- 28 November – John Major is officially appointed prime minister by the Queen, as Margaret Thatcher officially tenders her resignation after leaving 10 Downing Street for the last time.
- 29 November – By-elections are held in the neighbouring Scottish constituencies of Paisley North and Paisley South, caused by the deaths of their respective Labour MPs Allen Adams on 5 September and Norman Buchan on 23 October. Labour fends off the Scottish National Party and wins both by-elections.

=== December ===
- 1 December
  - Channel Tunnel workers from the United Kingdom and France meet 40 metres beneath the English Channel seabed, establishing the first land connection between the United Kingdom and the mainland of Europe for around 8,000 years.
  - The CBI predicts that the recession will last longer than predicted, and that GDP is likely to fall by at least 1% in 1991.
- 2 December – BSB Galaxy shuts down for the final time, replaced by Sky One.
- 3 December – The mother of Gail Kinchin is awarded £8,000 in the High Court, a decade after her pregnant 16-year-old daughter was killed by a police marksman who intervened with a siege at the Birmingham flat where she was being held hostage by her boyfriend.
- 6 December
  - Saddam Hussein announces that all British hostages in Iraq are to be released.
  - House price inflation has returned and stands at 0.2% for November, the first year-on-year rise in house prices since February.
- 8 December
  - The UK grinds to a halt following heavy snow overnight. Large parts of the country are without power after snowfall brings down power lines, disrupting the electricity supply. Many rural areas are cut off for several days, while the Army is called out to help restore power.
  - There is grim news for the retail industry as a CBI survey reports that retail sales have hit a standstill and High Street employment will fall.
- 11 December
  - The first British hostages from Iraq released by Saddam Hussein arrive back in the UK.
  - The government makes £42 million compensation available to the 1,200 British haemophiliacs infected with the AIDS virus through blood transfusions.
- 12 December – The new chancellor Norman Lamont rules out an early cut in interest rates which critics, including opposition MP's, claim would be a quick route out of recession.
- 13 December
  - Russell Bishop is sentenced to life imprisonment for the abduction, indecent assault and attempted murder of a seven-year-old girl in Brighton in February this year. He was cleared of the murder of two young girls in Brighton four years ago but will be convicted for that crime in 2018.
  - Poundland, a supermarket chain selling all items for £1, opens its first store at Burton upon Trent, Staffordshire.
  - Netto, a Danish discount food supermarket chain, launches its first UK store in Leeds.
  - The sharpest rise in unemployment since 1981 has taken it to more than 1,700,000, with 155,000 jobs having been lost in Britain since April. Economists blame high interest rates; a government method to combat inflation.
- 19 December – Tony Adams, the Arsenal captain and England defender, is sentenced to four months in prison for a drink-driving offence committed near his home in Southend-on-Sea on 6 May this year. He is also fined £500 and banned from driving for two years.
- 20 December
  - British women Karyn Smith (aged 19) and Patricia Cahill (aged 20) receive 25-year prison sentences in Thailand for heroin smuggling after being arrested in Bangkok five months ago. Their lawyers are planning to ask for a Royal pardon.
  - An era ends in the Rhondda, South Wales, when the last coalmine closes after more than 100 years of heavy coalmining in the region. 300 miners have lost their jobs and just seventeen will remain employed in the industry elsewhere in the valley.
- 23 December – The nine-month-old daughter of the Duke and Duchess of York is christened Eugenie Victoria Helena.
- 25 December – Storms on Christmas Day leave more than 100,000 British homes without power.
- 26 December – The fatwa (order to kill) against Satanic Verses author Salman Rushdie is upheld by Ayatollah Ali Khamenei, more than one year after it was first issued. Rushdie is still living in hiding.
- 27 December – The latest MORI poll shows that Conservative support has been boosted by the appointment of John Major, with his party now just four points behind Labour – eight months after Labour had peaked with a 23-point lead.
- 29 December – Leading economists warn that the recession creeping upon Britain will deepen during 1991 and unemployment is likely to increase to well over 2,000,000 from the current total of over 1,700,000.
- 30 December – An opinion poll shows Labour slightly ahead of the Conservatives for the first time since John Major became prime minister.
- 31 December – 89-year-old romantic novelist Barbara Cartland becomes a Dame in the 1991 New Year Honours.

=== Undated ===
- Inflation reaches 9.5% for the first time since 1981.

== Publications ==
- Iain M. Banks' novel Use of Weapons.
- Louis de Bernières' novel The War of Don Emmanuel's Nether Parts.
- A. S. Byatt's novel Possession: A Romance.
- Elizabeth Jane Howard's novel The Light Years, first of the Cazalet series.
- Hanif Kureishi's novel The Buddha of Suburbia.
- Ian McEwan's novel The Innocent.
- Terry Pratchett's Discworld novels Eric and Moving Pictures and The Bromeliad novels Diggers and Wings.
- Terry Pratchett and Neil Gaiman's novel Good Omens.

== Births ==
- 4 January – Lucy Letby, convicted serial killer
- 7 January – Jack Gallagher, pro wrestler
- 9 January – Jonathan Gullis, politician
- 11 January – Mark Wood, cricketer
- 14 January – Oli London, internet troll
- 15 January
  - Stephen Bear, television personality and sex offender
  - Paul Blake, English sprinter
- 18 January – Scott Williams, darts player
- 1 February
  - Dan Gosling, English footballer
  - Laura Marling, English folk-pop singer-songwriter
- 6 February – Dominic Sherwood, English actor and model
- 8 February
  - Jonathan Page, English footballer
  - Emily Scarratt, English rugby union player
- 13 February – Olivia Allison, swimmer
- 17 February – Alex Banfield, operatic tenor
- 19 February – Luke Pasqualino, actor
- 20 February – Anjli Mohindra, actress
- 28 February – Georgina Leonidas, actress
- 1 March
  - Harry Eden, actor
  - James Lomas, actor
- 2 March – Cadet, English rapper (d. 2019)
- 5 March – Danny Drinkwater, English footballer
- 10 March - Olivia Blake, Labour politician
- 17 March – Greg Stewart, Scottish footballer
- 19 March – Maddy Hill, actress
- 23 March – Princess Eugenie of York, daughter of The Duke and Duchess of York
- 24 March – Cleo Sol, musician
- 28 March – Zoe Sugg, YouTuber and vlogger
- 6 April – Kate Forbes, Scottish politician
- 10 April
  - Ben Amos, English footballer
  - Alex Pettyfer, actor
- 15 April Emma Watson, actress
- 20 April – Abby Mavers, English actress
- 21 April – Chris Broad, YouTuber
- 23 April
  - Dev Patel, actor
  - Callum Smith, boxer
- 27 April – Martin Kelly, footballer
- 6 May – Craig Dawson, footballer
- 16 May – Thomas Sangster, actor
- 20 May – Josh O'Connor, actor
- 26 May – Nadia Oh, musician
- 28 May – Kyle Walker, footballer
- 31 May – Chris Dobey, darts player
- 2 June – Jack Lowden, actor
- 9 June – Lauren Socha, actress
- 13 June – Aaron Taylor-Johnson, actor
- 16 June – John Newman, singer
- 17 June
  - Jordan Henderson, footballer
  - Laura Wright, singer
- 18 June – Jacob Anderson, actor
- 19 June – Chuku Modu, actor
- 24 June – Rosie Jones, comedian
- 27 June – TomSka, youtuber
- 5 July – Nikki Patel, actress
- 7 July – Joe Marler, English rugby union player
- 15 July – Olly Alexander, actor and singer
- 19 July – GFOTY, signer
- 21 July – Chris Martin, footballer
- 24 July
  - Jay McGuiness, English pop singer
  - Dean Stoneman, English racing driver
- 29 July – Joey Essex, reality TV personality
- 30 July – Chris Maxwell, Welsh footballer
- 2 August – Chris Billam-Smith, boxer
- 3 August
  - James Baxter, actor
  - Jourdan Dunn, model
- 10 August – Tai Woffinden, speedway rider
- 13 August – Jamal Edwards, music entrepreneur (d. 2022)
- 14 September – Alex and Sam Lowes, twin brother motorcycle racers
- 18 September – Michael Smith, darts world champion
- 21 September – Rob Cross, darts player
- 27 September – Lola Kirke, English-born American actress and singer
- 1 October – Charlotte McDonnell, YouTube personality
- 8 October – Karl Darlow, English footballer
- 12 October – Henri Lansbury, English footballer
- 17 October – Scarlett Moffatt, TV presenter
- 18 October – Danny Mayor, English footballer
- 20 October – Jamie George, English rugby union player
- 14 November – Josh Warrington, boxer
- 26 November – Danny Welbeck, footballer
- 28 November – Holly Hale, model
- 10 December – Bryony Page, trampolinist
- 13 December − Joseph Garrett, YouTuber, gamer, author, actor, voice actor, and stop-motion animator
- 17 December – John Rooney, footballer
- 20 December – Bugzy Malone, English grime rapper
- 26 December
  - Heather Knight, cricketer
  - Aaron Ramsey, footballer
- 30 December – Joe Root, cricketer

== Deaths ==
=== January ===
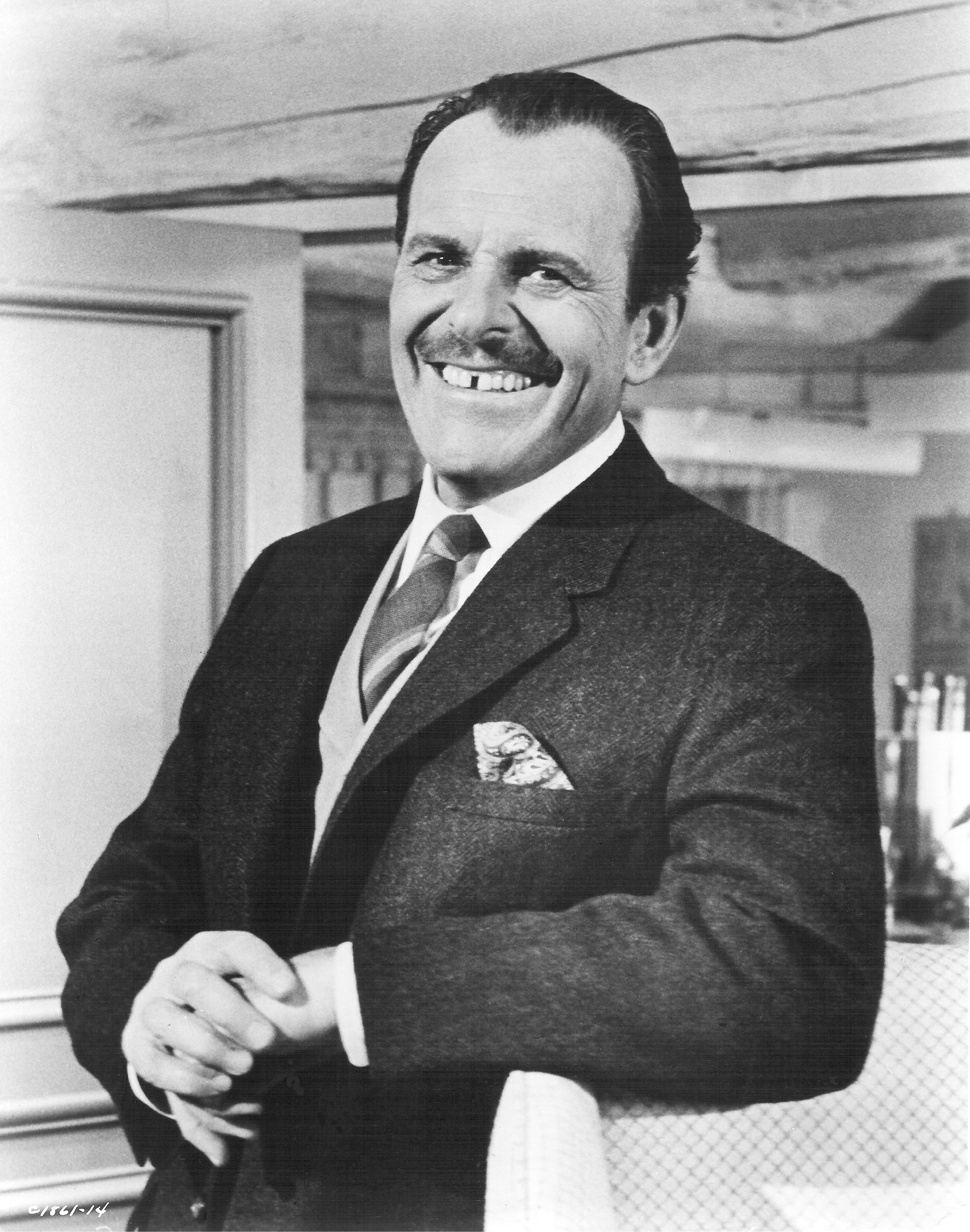
Terry-Thomas

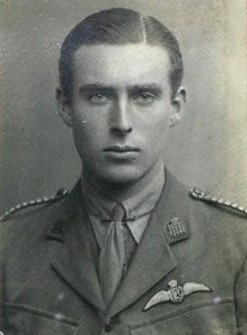
F. W. Winterbotham

- 1 January – Joe Hardstaff Jr, cricketer (born 1911)
- 2 January – Reginald Paget, Baron Paget of Northampton, lawyer and politician (born 1908)
- 3 January – William Wells, lawyer and politician (born 1908)
- 4 January – Lydia Bilbrook, actress (born 1888)
- 6 January – Ian Charleson, actor (born 1949)
- 7 January
  - Gerald Gardiner, Baron Gardiner, Lord Chancellor (1964–1970) (born 1900)
  - Edwin McAlpine, Baron McAlpine of Moffat, construction magnate (born 1907)
- 8 January – Terry-Thomas, actor (born 1911)
- 9 January – Sir Roger Bower, Army lieutenant-general (born 1903)
- 10 January – John Benham, Olympic runner (born 1900)
- 14 January
  - Rosalind Pitt-Rivers, biochemist (born 1907)
  - John Witty, actor (born 1915)
- 15 January – Gordon Jackson, actor (born 1923)
- 16 January – Ruskin Spear, artist (born 1911)
- 17 January – Simon Nicholson, artist (born 1934)
- 18 January
  - Melanie Appleby, singer (born 1966)
  - Elke Mackenzie, explorer and botanist (born 1911)
- 19 January – Alberto Semprini, pianist (born 1908)
- 20 January – Robert Donington, musicologist (born 1907)
- 22 January – Bill Ferrar, mathematician (born 1893)
- 23 January – Derek Royle, actor (born 1928)
- 24 January – John Blacking, anthropologist (born 1928)
- 26 January – Bob Gerard, racing driver (born 1914)
- 27 January – Pit Corder, linguist (born 1918)
- 28 January – F. W. Winterbotham, RAF officer and World War II spy (born 1897)

=== February ===
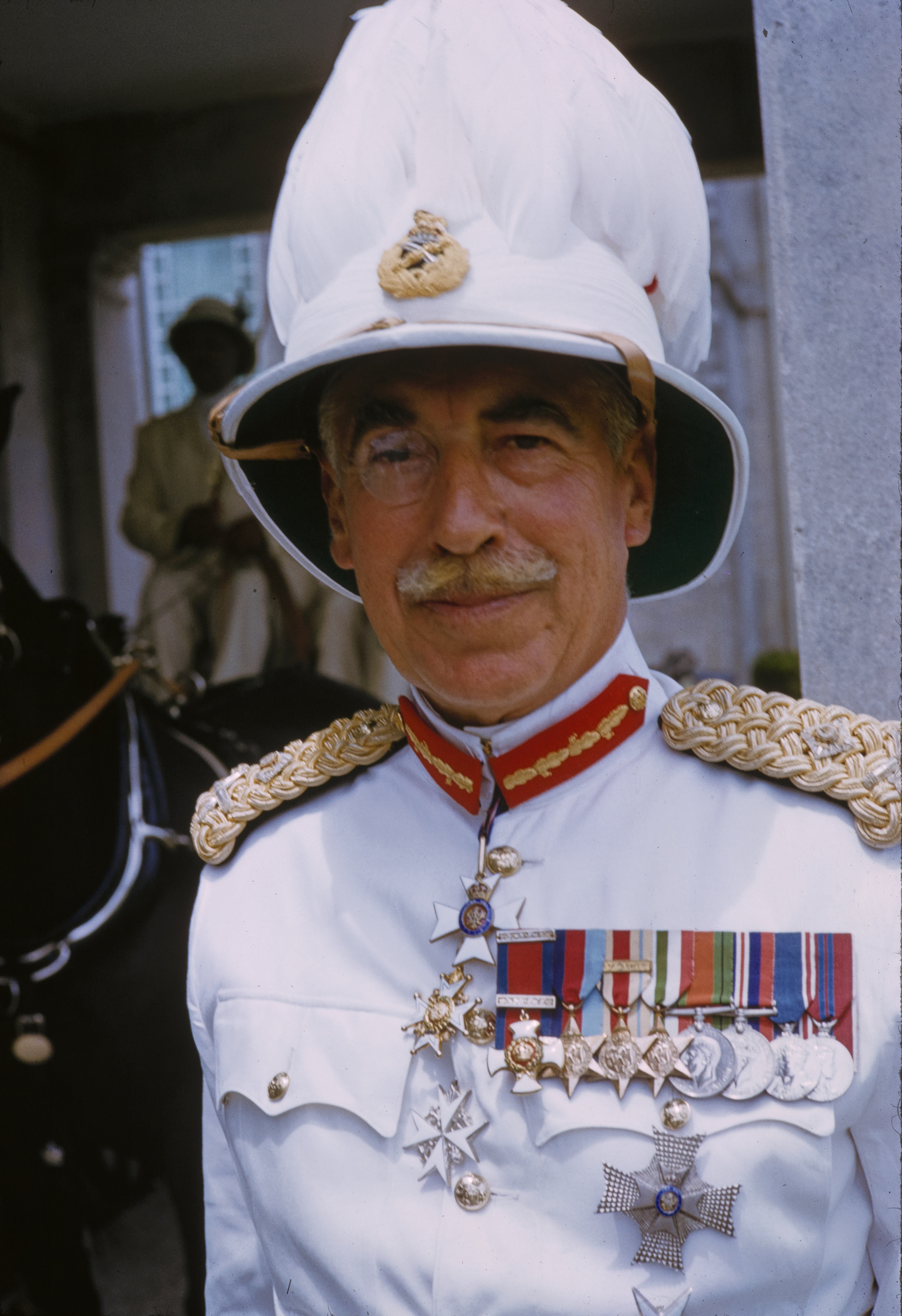
Julian Gascoigne

- 1 February – Peter Racine Fricker, composer (born 1920)
- 2 February – Kathleen Hamilton, Duchess of Abercorn, Mistress of the Robes to Queen Elizabeth The Queen Mother (born 1905)
- 6 February – John Merivale, actor (born 1917, Canada)
- 8 February
  - Rhys Adrian, playwright and screenwriter (born 1928)
  - Charles Maclean, Baron Maclean, Lord Chamberlain to the Queen (1971–1984) (born 1916)
  - Sir Ernest Titterton, nuclear physicist (born 1916)
- 10 February – Sir John Arthur Pilcher, diplomat (born 1912)
- 11 February – Colin Henderson Roberts, classical scholar (born 1909)
- 12 February – Harold McCusker, Ulster Unionist Member of Parliament (born 1940)
- 15 February – Norman Parkinson, photographer (born 1913)
- 16 February – J. C. Trewin, journalist (born 1908)
- 18 February
  - Margaret Craske, ballet dancer and choreographer (born 1892)
  - Joe Erskine, boxer (born 1934)
- 19 February
  - Laura Spencer-Churchill, Duchess of Marlborough, socialite (born 1915)
  - Michael Powell, filmmaker (born 1905)
- 25 February – Henry Fairlie, political journalist (born 1924)
- 26 February – Sir Julian Gascoigne, Army major-general (born 1903)
- 28 February
  - Fabia Drake, actress (born 1905)
  - Colin Milburn, English cricketer (born 1941)
  - Greville Wynne, engineer and businessman (born 1919)

=== March ===
- 2 March – Arthur Fleischmann, sculptor (born 1896, Austria-Hungary)
- 5 March – Timothy Mason, Marxist historian of Nazi Germany (born 1940); suicide in Italy
- 7 March – Ruth Glass, sociologist and urban planner (born 1912, German Empire)
- 8 March – Jack Lindsay, writer (born 1900, Australia)
- 10 March
  - Michael Stewart, Baron Stewart of Fulham, politician (born 1906)
  - Lance Tingay, tennis journalist (born 1915)
- 11 March – Dean Horrix, English footballer (born 1961); car accident
- 12 March
  - Wallace Breem, author (born 1926)
  - Jane Grigson, cookery writer (born 1928)
  - Rosamond Lehmann, novelist and translator (born 1901)
  - Harry South, jazz pianist and composer (born 1929)
- 13 March – Hugh Cholmondeley, 6th Marquess of Cholmondeley, peer and Lord Great Chamberlain (born 1919)
- 14 March – Aubrey Wisberg, filmmaker (born 1909)
- 15 March – Farzad Bazoft, journalist (born 1958, Iran); executed in Iran
- 17 March – Ric Grech, rock musician (born 1945)
- 18 March – Eileen Soper, artist (born 1905)
- 20 March
  - Sir Kenneth Mather, geneticist (born 1911)
  - Victor Rothschild, 3rd Baron Rothschild, banker, intelligence officer and zoologist (born 1910)
- 21 March – Allan Roberts, Labour Member of Parliament (born 1943)
- 22 March – Geoffrey Ostergaard, political scientist (born 1926)
- 23 March – John Dexter, theatre director (born 1925)
- 27 March – Sir Alfred Earle, RAF air marshal (born 1907)

=== April ===
Geoffrey Harrison

- 2 April
  - Vanda Godsell, actress (born 1922)
  - Peter Jones, radio broadcaster (born 1930)
- 6 April
  - James MacNabb, Olympic rower (1924) (born 1901)
  - Peter Doherty, Northern Irish footballer (born 1913)
- 10 April – Sir Hugh Trefusis Brassey, Army colonel and magistrate (born 1915)
- 12 April – Sir Geoffrey Harrison, diplomat (born 1908)
- 15 April – Jock Bruce-Gardyne, politician (born 1930)
- 20 April
  - N. H. Gibbs, academic (born 1910)
  - Alex McCrindle, actor (born 1911)
  - George Reindorp, former Bishop of Salisbury (born 1911)
- 21 April – R. B. Braithwaite, philosopher and theologian (born 1900)
- 22 April – Rosalind Moss, Egyptologist (born 1890)
- 23 April – Charlie Wilson, criminal (Great Train Robbery) (born 1932); murdered in Spain
- 28 April – Peter Fuller, art critic (born 1947); car accident
- 30 April – Ken Chisholm, Scottish footballer (born 1925)

=== May ===
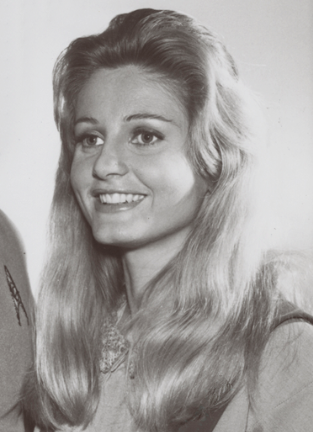
Jill Ireland

- 2 May
  - Ann Casson, actress (born 1915)
  - David Rappaport, actor (born 1951); suicide
- 4 May – John Ormond, poet and filmmaker (born 1923)
- 5 May – Sir Reginald Goodall, orchestral conductor (born 1901)
- 7 May – Ann Bishop, biologist (born 1899)
- 8 May – Tomás Ó Fiaich, cardinal (born 1923)
- 9 May – George Kennedy Young, politician and merchant banker (born 1911)
- 15 May – Peter Grimwade, television director and screenwriter (born 1942)
- 18 May
  - Jill Ireland, actress and singer (born 1936)
  - Lorna Johnstone, equestrian (born 1902)
- 21 May
  - Mrs Victor Bruce (Mary Petre), racing driver (born 1895)
  - Max Wall, comedian and actor (born 1908)
- 22 May
  - Pat Reid, Army officer and historian (born 1910)
  - Leslie Spriggs, politician (born 1910)
- 24 May – John Kendall-Carpenter, English rugby union player (born 1925)
- 27 May – Jessie MacWilliams, mathematician (born 1917)
- 28 May – Ralph Bagnold, geologist (born 1896)
- 30 May – Charles Morris, Baron Morris of Grasmere, philosopher (born 1898)

=== June ===
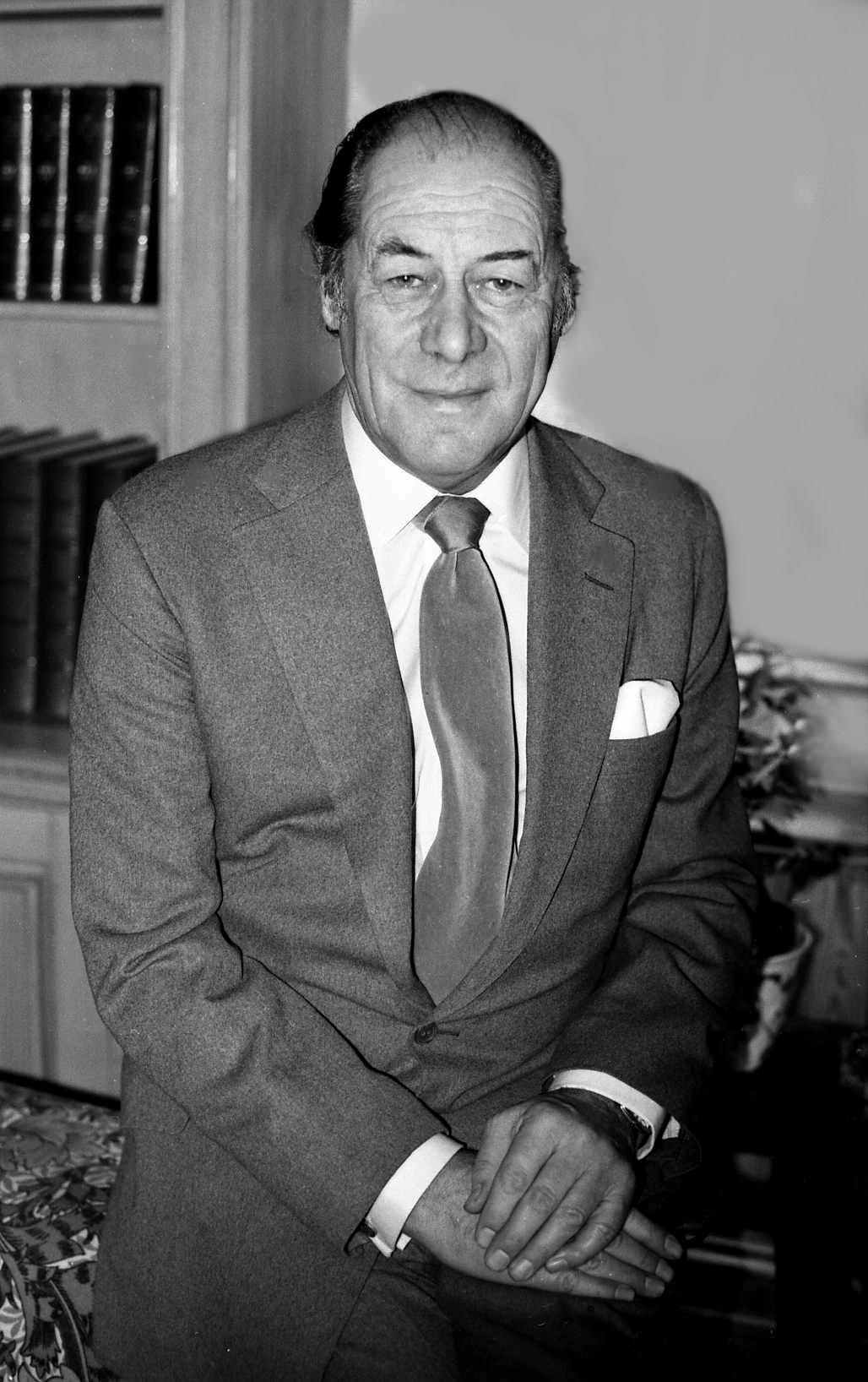
Rex Harrison

- 1 June – Eric Barker, comedy actor (born 1912)
- 2 June – Sir Rex Harrison, actor (born 1908)
- 3 June
  - Robert Edwards, politician (born 1905)
  - Ivor Raymonde, musician (born 1926)
- 6 June
  - Albert Alderman, cricketer and footballer (born 1907)
  - Joe Loss, bandleader (born 1909)
- 7 June – Sir Robert Perceval Armitage, colonial administrator (born 1906)
- 9 June
  - James Carreras, film producer (born 1909)
  - Eric Fletcher, Baron Fletcher, politician (born 1903)
  - Angus McBean, photographer (born 1904)
- 12 June – Terence O'Neill, politician, Prime Minister of Northern Ireland (1963–1969) (born 1914)
- 13 June
  - Antony Andrewes, historian (born 1910)
  - Thomas Ponsonby, 3rd Baron Ponsonby of Shulbrede, peer and politician (born 1930)
- 15 June
  - Raymond Huntley, actor (born 1904)
  - Leonard Sachs, actor (born 1909, South Africa)
- 16 June
  - Thomas Cowling, astronomer (born 1906)
  - Dame Eva Turner, opera singer (born 1892)
- 17 June – Ronald F. Tylecote, archaeologist (born 1916)
- 20 June – Sir Tom Hopkinson, journalist (born 1905)
- 21 June – Cedric Belfrage, journalist (born 1904)
- 22 June – Elizabeth Harwood, opera singer (born 1938)
- 23 June – Frank Gatliff, actor (born 1927, Australia)
- 24 June – Sean Hughes, Labour Member of Parliament (born 1946)
- 26 June – Sidney Smith, snooker player (born 1908)
- 30 June
  - Lynne Carol, actress (born 1914)
  - Brian Tiler, footballer, manager and director (born 1943); car accident in Italy

=== July ===
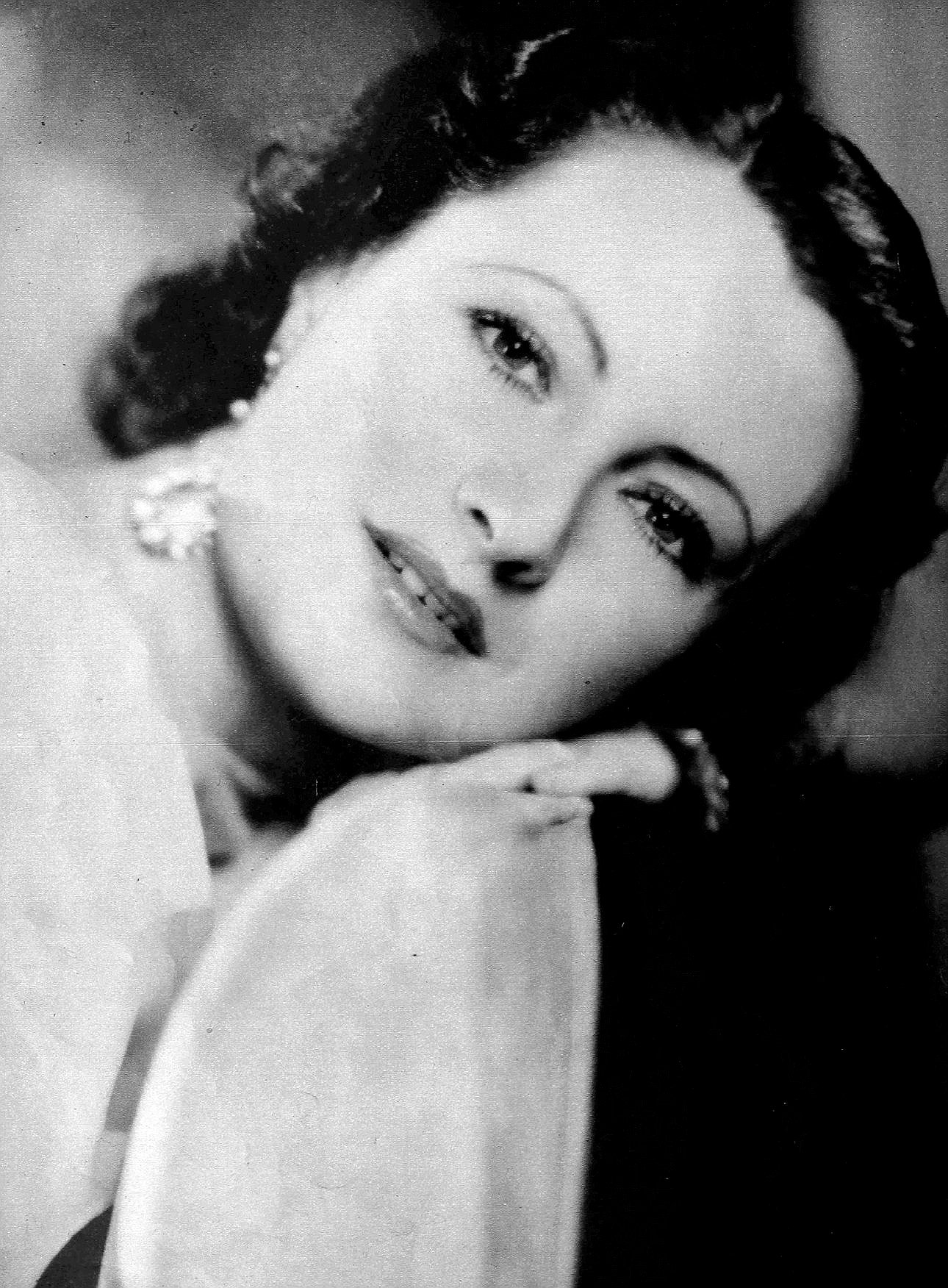
Jill Esmond

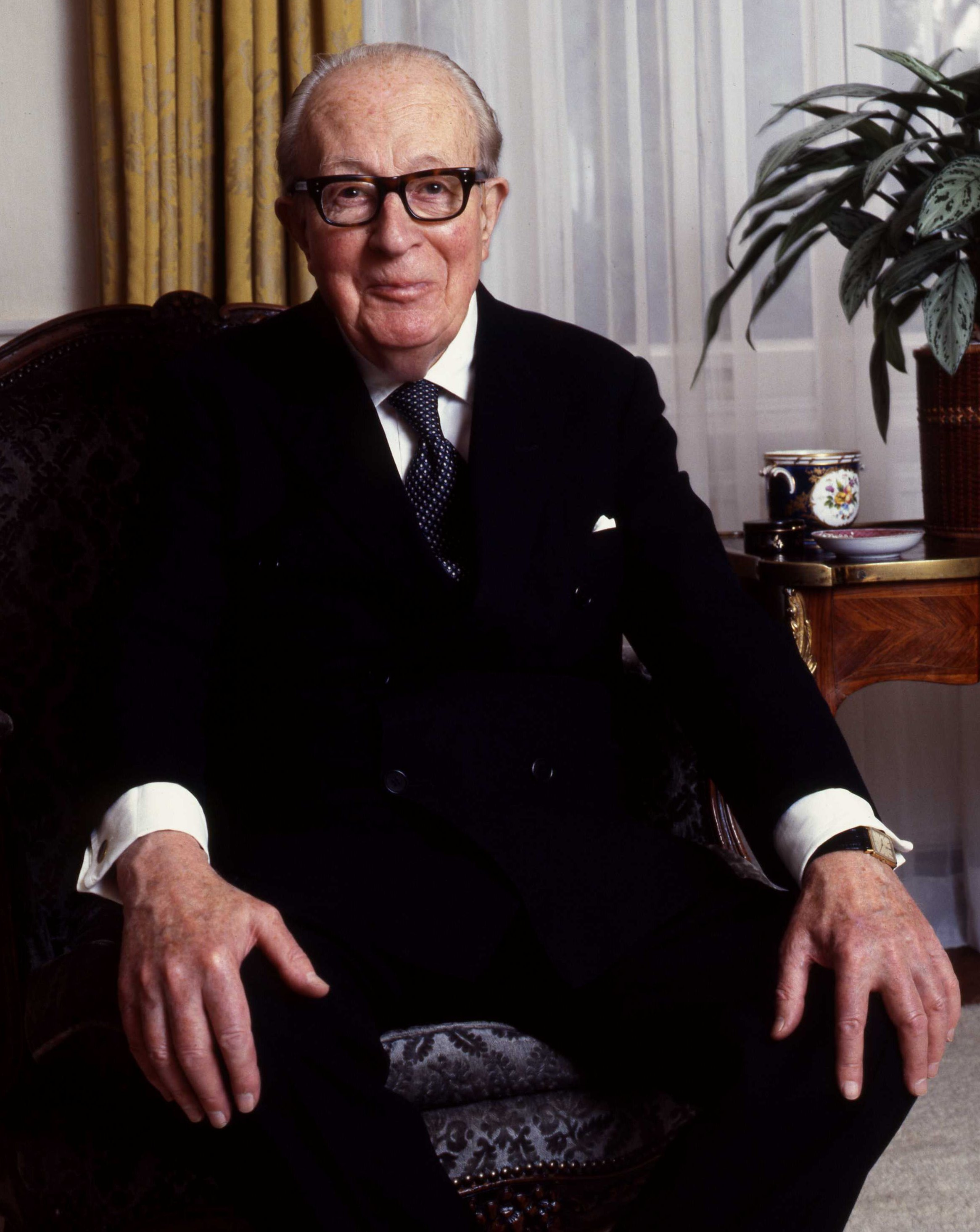
Victor Cavendish-Bentinck, 9th Duke of Portland

- 1 July
  - Anna Palk, actress (born 1941)
  - Eric M. Rogers, physicist (born 1902)
- 8 July – Malcolm Hilton, English cricketer (born 1928)
- 14 July – Philip Leacock, television and film director (born 1917)
- 15 July
  - Alison Leggatt, actress (born 1904)
  - Margaret Lockwood, actress (born 1915)
- 16 July – Sidney Torch, composer and conductor (born 1908); suicide
- 17 July – Wilf Grant, English footballer (born 1920)
- 20 July – Michael Carr, Labour Member of Parliament for 57 days (born 1947)
- 22 July – Ray Mawby, politician (born 1922)
- 24 July – Alan Clarke, filmmaker (born 1935)
- 27 July – Elizabeth Allan, actress (born 1910)
- 28 July
  - Maurice Braddell, actor and author (born 1900)
  - Jill Esmond, actress (born 1908)
- 30 July
  - Victor Cavendish-Bentinck, 9th Duke of Portland, peer and diplomat (born 1897)
  - Launcelot Fleming, Anglican bishop and polar explorer (born 1906)
  - Ian Gow, Conservative Member of Parliament (born 1937)

=== August ===
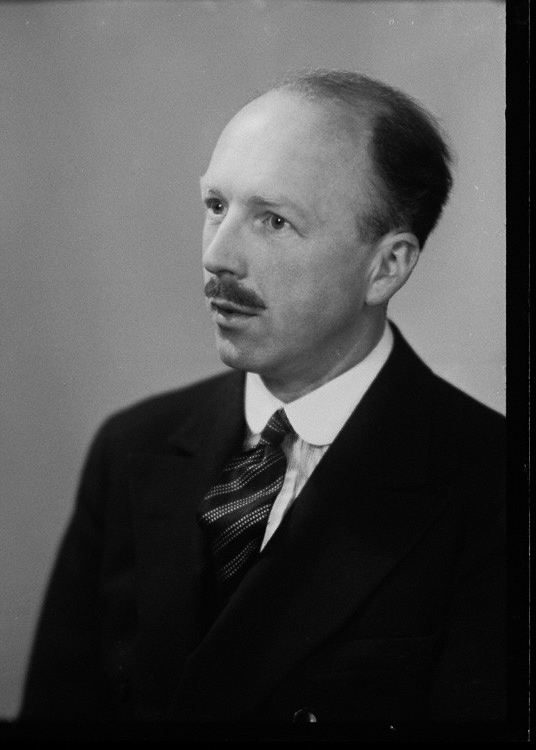
Francis Hastings, 16th Earl of Huntingdon

- 1 August
  - Michael Glenny, author and translator (born 1927)
  - Graham Young, convicted serial killer (born 1947)
- 2 August – Edwin Richfield, actor (born 1921)
- 5 August – Ivan Blatný, poet (born 1919, Czechoslovakia)
- 6 August – Pat Wall, politician (born 1933)
- 9 August – Joe Mercer, footballer and manager (born 1914)
- 12 August
  - Dorothy Mackaill, actress (born 1903)
  - Roy Williamson, songwriter (born 1936)
- 15 August – Billy Hume, Scottish footballer (born 1935)
- 17 August
  - Roderick Cook, actor and playwright (born 1932)
  - Graham Williams, television producer and screenwriter (born 1945); accidentally killed
- 20 August – Tim Barrett, actor (born 1929)
- 24 August – Francis Hastings, 16th Earl of Huntingdon, peer, artist and politician (born 1901)
- 25 August – David Hampshire, racing driver (born 1917)
- 26 August – Sir Peter Agnew, 1st Baronet, Royal Navy commander and politician (born 1900)
- 31 August – Bert Assirati, wrestler (born 1908)

=== September ===
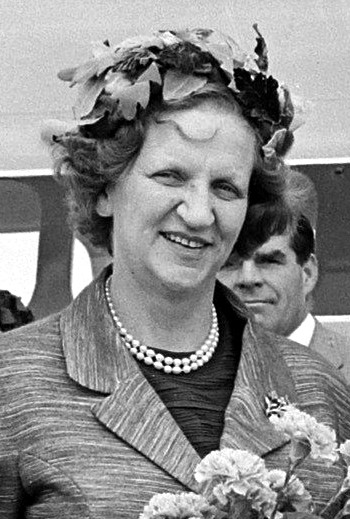
Elizabeth Douglas-Home, Baroness Home of the Hirsel

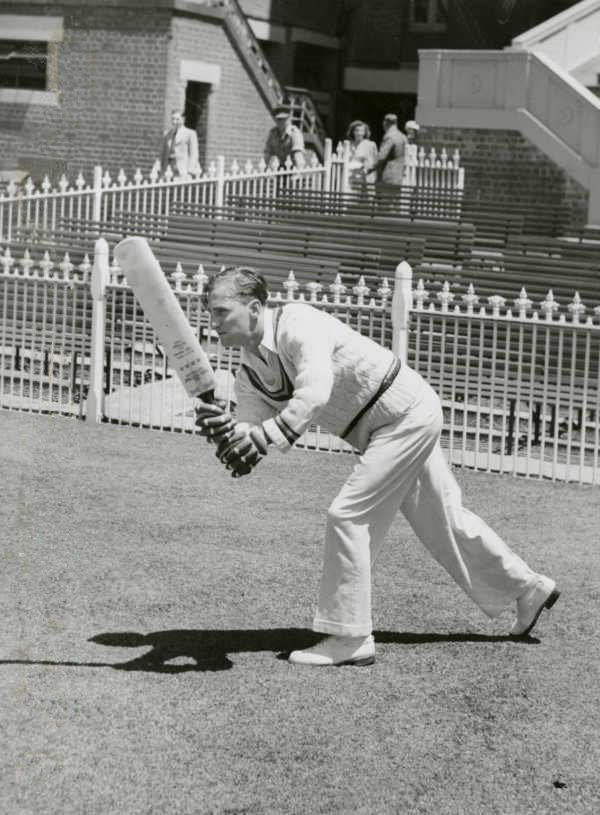
Len Hutton

- 2 September – John Bowlby, psychologist (born 1907)
- 3 September – Elizabeth Douglas-Home, Baroness Home of the Hirsel, socialite and wife of Alec Douglas-Home (born 1909)
- 5 September
  - Allen Adams, politician (born 1946)
  - Hugh Foot, Baron Caradon, colonial administrator (born 1907)
  - Jack Hildyard, cinematographer (born 1908)
  - Graham Hough, literary critic (born 1908)
- 6 September – Len Hutton, cricketer (born 1916)
- 7 September – A. J. P. Taylor, historian (born 1906)
- 8 September
  - Kathleen Gough, anthropologist (born 1925)
  - Denys Watkins-Pitchford, writer (born 1905)
- 9 September – Molly Adair, actress (born 1905)
- 11 September – F. F. Bruce, biblical scholar (born 1910)
- 12 September – Athene Seyler, actress (born 1889)
- 16 September – Harold Palin, English rugby league player (born 1916)
- 18 September
  - Richard Eric Holttum, botanist (born 1895)
  - Walter Thompson Welford, physicist (born 1916)
- 22 September – Michael Swann, Baron Swann, biologist (born 1920)
- 27 September – John Aldam Aizlewood, Army major-general (born 1895)
- 28 September – Dan Davin, author (born 1913, New Zealand)
- 30 September – W. F. R. Hardie, philosopher (born 1902)

=== October ===
- 1 October
  - John Stewart Bell, physicist, discoverer of Bell's theorem (born 1928)
  - Sir Edmund George Irving, Royal Navy admiral and hydrographer (born 1910)
- 4 October
  - Alyn Ainsworth, singer, composer and orchestral conductor (born 1924)
  - Jill Bennett, actress (born 1931, British India); suicide
  - Avis Bunnage, actress (born 1923)
  - Peter Taylor, English footballer and manager (born 1928)
- 8 October – B. J. Wilson, rock drummer (born 1947)
- 9 October – Richard Murdoch, comedy actor (born 1907)
- 10 October – Kenneth Cross, paediatrician and physiologist (born 1916)
- 12 October – Bridget Bate Tichenor, Surrealist painter (born 1917)
- 15 October – Gwen Nelson, actress (born 1901)
- 16 October – Roger Powell, bookbinder (born 1896)
- 18 October – Sir Ben Lockspeiser, scientific administrator (born 1891)
- 20 October – Freda Jackson, actress (born 1907)
- 21 October – Jo Ann Kelly, blues singer and guitarist (born 1944)
- 23 October
  - Norman Buchan, politician (born 1922)
  - Berthold Lubetkin, architect (born 1901, Russian Empire)
- 29 October – Emrys Roberts, politician (born 1910)
- 31 October – Harold Caccia, Baron Caccia, diplomat (born 1905, British India)

=== November ===
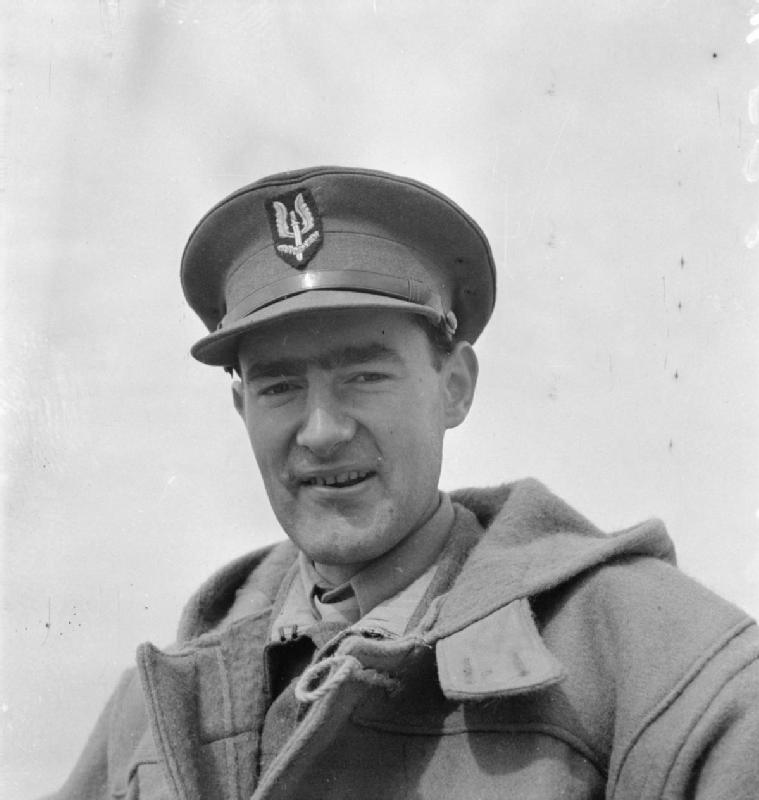
David Stirling

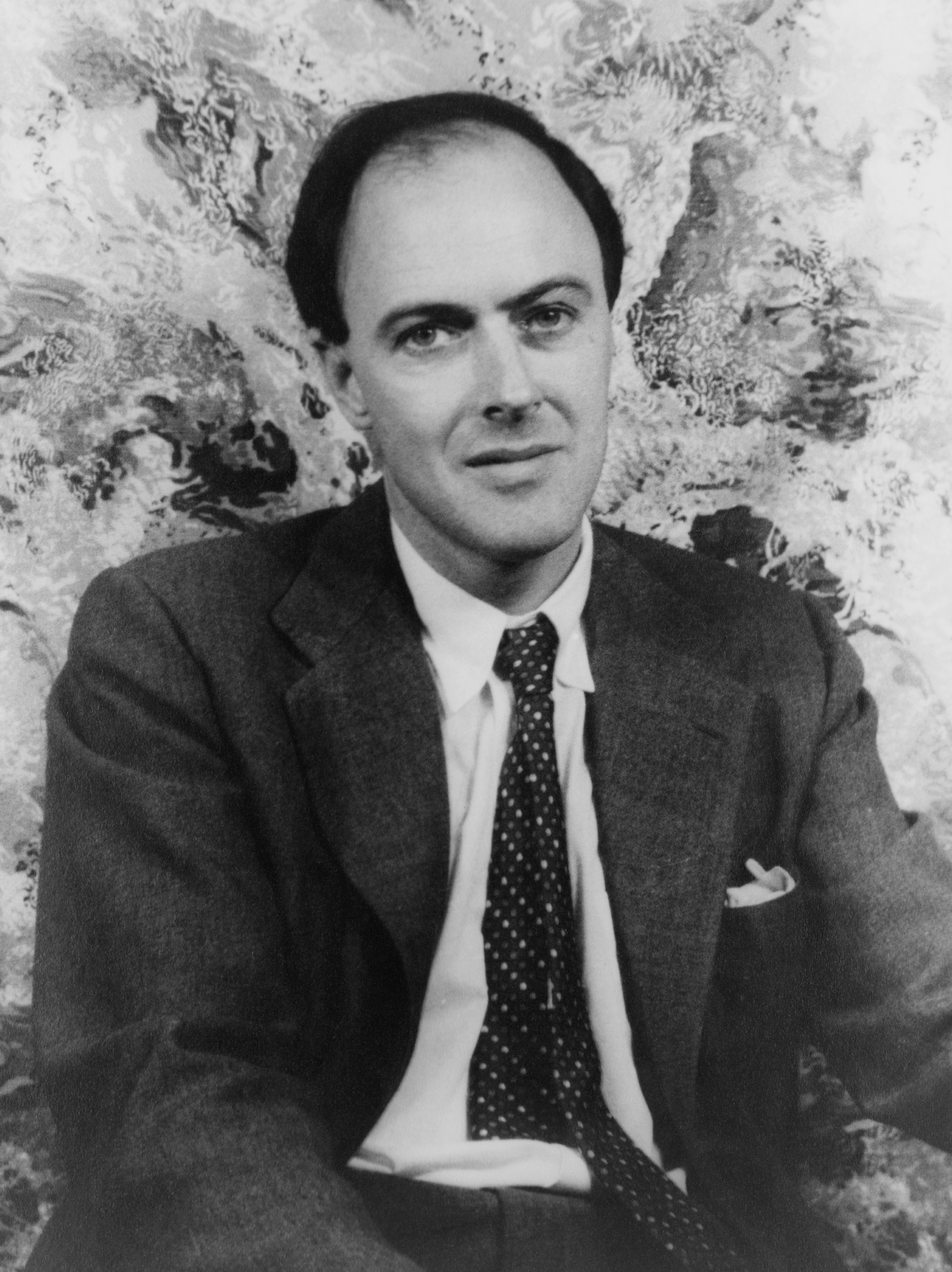
Roald Dahl

- 3 November
  - Valerie French, actress (born 1928)
  - George Gale, journalist (born 1927)
- 4 November – Sir David Stirling, Army lieutenant-colonel and founder of the SAS (born 1915)
- 5 November – Erich Heller, essayist (born 1911, Austria-Hungary)
- 6 November – Rodrigo Moynihan, painter (born 1910)
- 7 November
  - Lawrence Durrell, writer (born 1912)
  - Josephine Wilson, Baroness Miles, actress and wife of Bernard Miles, Baron Miles (born 1904)
- 10 November – Tommy Sale, English footballer (born 1910)
- 13 November
  - Don Chaffey, film director (born 1913)
  - Rowland Emett, kinetic sculptor (born 1906)
  - Richard Lewis, operatic tenor (born 1914)
- 14 November – Malcolm Muggeridge, journalist, author and media personality (born 1903)
- 15 November – Jill Day, singer and actress (born 1930)
- 17 November – Edna Hughes, Olympic swimmer (born 1916)
- 18 November
  - Fred Daly, Northern Irish golfer (born 1911)
  - Beatrice Shilling, aeronautical engineer (born 1909)
- 21 November – Vernon Ellis Cosslett, microscopist (born 1908)
- 22 November – Jack Petersen, boxer (born 1911)
- 23 November – Roald Dahl, author (born 1916)
- 24 November – Dodie Smith, novelist and playwright (born 1896)
- 26 November – Edward Pearce, Baron Pearce, judge (born 1901)

=== December ===
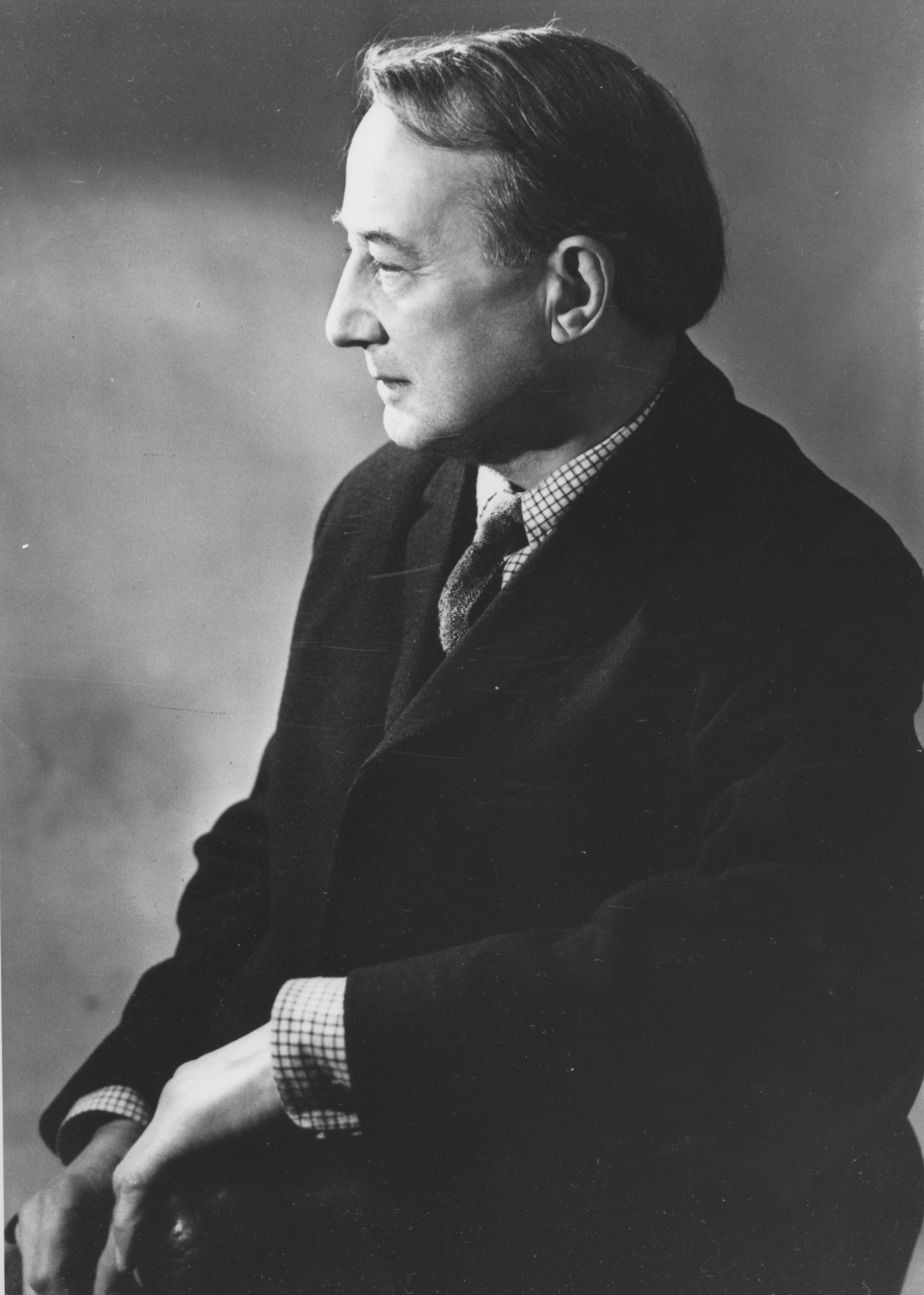
Michael Oakeshott

- 7 December – Oscar Millard, screenwriter (born 1908)
- 11 December – David Turner, playwright (born 1927)
- 12 December
  - Jack Harley, botanist (born 1911)
  - Sir Ian Trethowan, journalist and broadcaster (born 1922)
- 15 December – Frederic Seebohm, Baron Seebohm, banker and social work innovator (born 1909); road accident
- 18 December – Arthur Roy Clapham, botanist (born 1904)
- 19 December
  - Basil Henson, actor (born 1918)
  - Michael Oakeshott, philosopher (born 1901)
- 20 December
  - Andrea Dunbar, playwright (born 1961)
  - John Hewetson, newspaper editor (born 1913)
- 22 December – Robin Friday, English footballer (born 1952)
- 24 December
  - Judith Ledeboer, architect (born 1901, the Netherlands)
  - Gwyn Williams, writer (born 1904)
- 25 December – Dodo Watts, actress (born 1910)
- 29 December – David Piper, curator and novelist (born 1918)
- 31 December – Donald Kingaby, World War II air ace (born 1920)

== See also ==
- 1990 in British music
- 1990 in British television
- List of British films of 1990
