= 1930 in British radio =

This is a list of events from British radio in 1930.

== Events ==
- 8 March – Last day of broadcast for 5GB Daventry, the BBC's experimental National Programme which has been running on a scheduled basis since 21 August 1927; it is replaced by the National Programme Daventry.
- 9 March – First day of broadcast for the BBC's new National and Regional Programmes, which gradually replace the existing call-signed regional radio stations. 9 May sees three new stations broadcast: the National Programme (aka National Programme Daventry, replacing station 5XX), the Regional Programme London (replacing 2LO) and the Regional Programme Midlands. The BBC also opens its second high-power medium-wave transmitter at Brookmans Park, north of London.
- 18 April – BBC radio listeners uniquely hear the announcement "Good evening. Today is Good Friday. There is no news." Piano music follows.
- 28 May – The BBC Symphony Orchestra is formed as a permanent full-scale ensemble under the directorship of Adrian Boult. It gives its first concert on 22 October at the Queen's Hall, London.
- 14 June–19 July – The Scoop, a serial written by members of the Detection Club, is broadcast on the BBC National Programme.
- 12 October – First day of broadcast of the National Programme London, providing better reception for the south of England than is available from Daventry.
- Elsie and Doris Waters introduce the radio comedy characters Gert and Daisy.

== Births ==
- 6 February – Lionel Blue, reform rabbi and broadcaster (died 2016)
- 7 February – Peter Jones, Welsh-born sports commentator (died 1990)
- 7 April – Cliff Morgan, Welsh rugby union player, sports commentator and broadcasting executive (died 2013)
- 4 June – Edward Kelsey, actor (died 2019)
- 17 July – Ray Galton, comedy scriptwriter (died 2018)
