= United (TV series) =

- Genre: Documentary
- Country of origin: United Kingdom
- Original language: English
- No. of seasons: 1
- No. of episodes: 6

Production
- Running time: 30 minutes

Original release
- Network: BBC Two
- Release: 6 April – 11 May 1990

For the 1960s UK TV series, see United!.

United was a 1990 television documentary series first screened in the United Kingdom on BBC Two in 1990. The series followed the fortunes of English football team Sheffield United during the 1989–90 football season.

== Themes and format ==
Consisting of six half-hour episodes, the series followed Sheffield United as they chased promotion from Division Two, with the final episode focusing on the final games of the season as they achieved this ambition. Each of the episodes concerned one element of United the cameras were given full behind-the-scenes access to the club's inner workings.

Each episode focused on a specific element of the club:

- The Players
- The Wives
- The Board
- The Fans
- The Apprentices
- The Managers

== Transmission ==
Debuting on 6 April 1990, the series was first shown on BBC Two with each episode airing at 9pm on successive Fridays.

The theme song for each episode was United by Judas Priest.
