= Walter Thompson Welford =

British physicist

Walter Thompson Welford FRS
- Born: Walter Weinstein; 31 August 1916; London, UK
- Died: 18 September 1990 (aged 74)
- Citizenship: British
- Education: B.Sc. (1942)
- Alma mater: University of London
- Awards: Young Medal (1974)
- Scientific career
- Fields: physics, optics
- Institutions: Imperial College London

Walter Thompson Welford FRS (31 August 1916 – 18 September 1990) was a British physicist with expertise in optics.

== Biography ==
Welford attended Hackney Technical College, leaving at 16 to work as a technician at the London Hospital and then Oxford University Biochemistry Department. He studied mathematics privately and in 1942 obtained a first-class external degree from the University of London. After working for a time at the optical instrument manufacturer Adam Hilger Ltd., he came to Imperial College London in 1947 as a research assistant. He was appointed lecturer in 1951 and after successive promotions became a full professor of physics in 1973, retiring in 1983. He continued to be scientifically active at Imperial College and the University of Chicago until his death in 1990.

== Honours and awards ==
Welford was awarded the Institute of Physics Young Medal in 1974. He was elected to the Royal Society in 1980. He also won awards for his work in Microlithography and the ultraviolet: experiments with an excimer laser.

Patents

He held a patent for work in cutting by laser. This laid the ground for laser eye surgery. Walter Welford's pioneering and often cited work in Solar Energy, revolving around the optics of CPCs was the work that got him elected to the Royal Society, though others hold all the patents related to Solar Energy.

Other fields of expertise

Sub particle physics and the co-invention of the bubble chamber. Solar energy, and CPCs. Camera lens, one of his students worked with Walter on the invention of zoom camera lenses. Telescopes, Welford created some of the earliest shots of Jupiter from a lens he designed. Holograms Double glazing. Pilkington hired Welford to create Double glazing. Welford didn't own the patents.

There are several documents online such as the Optical legacy of Imperial College London, which cite the inventiveness of Welford and the department.

== Bibliography ==
A full bibliography appears on the accompanying microfiche, nat the Royal Society, in London. A photocopy is available from The Royal Society’s Library, at cost.

(1) (1) 1947 The reflectivity and transmittivity of multiple thin coatings. J. Opt. Soc. Am. 37, 576–581.

(2) (2) 1949 Wavefront aberrations of oblique pencils in a symmetrical optical system: refraction and transfer formulae. Proc. Phys. Soc. Lond. B 62, 726–740.

(3) (4) 1950 The computation of wavefront aberrations of oblique pencils in a symmetrical optical system. Proc. Phys. Soc. Lond. B 63, 709–723.

(4) (5) 1951 (With L. C. Martin & P. B. Watt) An apparatus for correlated interferometer and resolving power tests on camera lenses. Optica Acta (special number), 26–31.

(5) (14) 1954 Light distribution in the image of an incoherently illuminated edge. J. Opt. Soc. Am. 44, 610–615.

(6) (22) 1957 Scanning microscopy and particle size determination. J. Quekett Microsc. Club 4, 339–352.

(7) (23) 1957 (With E. W. Richards & A. R. Thomas) Design of a 21 ft. grating spectrograph using a plane grating. AERE Reports nos. 2152, 2163 and 2338.

(8) (24) 1958 (With P. N. Slater) Light transmitted by very small pinholes. J. Opt. Soc. Am. 48, 146–149.

(9) (26) 1959 (With L. Riddiford, B. Van der Raay, C. C. Butler, N. C. Barford, D. Macmullan, A. Thetford, D. B. Thomas, A. Amery, W. H. Evans, M. J. Moore and 6 others) Some features of the British National Hydrogen Bubble Chamber. In Proc. Int. Conf. High Energy Accelerators and Instrumentation (ed. L. Kowarski), pp. 445–453. Geneva: CERN.

(10) (35) 1962 Undergraduate textbooks in physics, vol. 1 (Geometrical optics; optical instrumentation). Amsterdam: North-Holland.

(11) (37) 1962 Tracing skew rays through concave diffraction gratings. Optica Acta 9, 389–394. Walter Thompson Welford 329

(12) (41) 1963 Bubble chamber optics. Appl. Optics 2, 981–986.

(13) (43) 1965 Aberration theory of gratings and grating mountings. Prog. Optics 4, 241–280.

(14) (44) 1966 (With L. C. Martin) Technical optics, 2nd edn, vol. 1. London: Pitman.

(15) (45) 1966 Obtaining increased focal depth in bubble chamber photography by an application of the hologram principle. Appl. Optics 5, 872.

(16) (49) 1968 The Mach effect and the microscope. Adv. Optics Electron Microsc. 2, 41–76.

(17) (51) 1968 (With K. H. Carnell, N. C. Gortmans & C. Pataky) A telecentric camera lens for bubble chamber photography. Optica Acta 15, 187–193.

(18) (52) 1968 (With D. Roaf, C. A. Bailey, G. Davey, B. A. Hands, J. MacKenzie, A. B. Millar, J. Moffatt, T. D. Peel, D. F. Shaw, W. Turner and 5 others) An 80 cm liquid helium bubble chamber. Nucl. Instrum. Methods 64, 301–309.

(19) (55) 1969 Fringe visibility and localisation in hologram interferometry. Optics Commun. 1, 123–125.

(20) (57) 1970 Fringe visibility and localisation in hologram interferometry with parallel displacement. Optics Commun. 1, 311–314.

(21) (65) 1971 (With J. C. Dainty) Reduction of speckle in image plane hologram reconstruction by moving pupils. Optics Commun. 3, 289–294.

(22) (66) 1971 (With R. A. Lawes) An illumination system of improved power and resolution for the HoughPowell device. Nucl. Instrum. Methods 96, 383–386.

(23) (69) 1971 Development and performance of the Argonne National Laboratory 140 deg. camera lens. In Proc. Int. Conf. Bubble Chamber Technology (ed. M. Derrick), vol. 2, pp. 915–940. Argonne National Laboratory.

(24) (71) 1971 Bubble chamber holography. In Proc. Int. Conf. Bubble Chamber Technology (ed. M. Derrick), vol. 2, pp. 997–1009. Argonne National Laboratory.

(25) (72) 1972 On the relationship between the modes of image formation in scanning microscopy and conventional microscopy. J. Microsc. 96, 105–107.

(26) (74) 1973 (With R. Q. Twiss) On the coherence length of a monochromator for use with a Michelson stellar interferometer. Optics Commun. 7, 103–106.

(27) (75) 1973 Isoplanatism and holography. Optics Commun. 8, 239–243.

(28) (76) 1973 Aplanatic hologram lenses on spherical surfaces. Optics Commun. 9, 268–269.

(29) (77) 1974 Film flatness, lens distortion, illumination and other matters in bubble chamber photography. Photogramm. Rec. 8, 167–177.

(30) (78) 1974 Aberrations of the symmetrical optical system. New York: Academic Press.

(31) (79) 1974 (With K. H. Carnell, M. J. Kidger, A. J. Overill, R. W. Reader, F. C. Reavell & C. G. Wynne) Some experiments on precision lens mounting. Optica Acta 21, 615–629.

(32) (81) 1975 First order statistics of speckle produced by weak scattering media. Optics Quantum Electron. 7, 413–416.

(33) (82) 1975 Practical design of an aplanatic hologram lens of focal length 50 mm and numerical aperture 0.5. Optics Commun. 15, 46–49.

(34) (87) 1976 Aplanatism and isoplanatism. Prog. Optics 13, 267–292.

(35) (88) 1976 Optics. Oxford University Press.

(36) (90) 1976 (With E. Jakeman) Speckle statistics in imaging. Optics Commun. 21, 72–79.

(37) (92) 1977 Optical estimation of statistics of surface roughness from light scattering measurements. Optics Quant. Electr., 9, 269–287.

(38) (97) 1978 (With D. J. Nicholas & C. Pataky) High aperture optics for laser compression experiments: a new type. Appl. Optics 17, 3368–3371.

(39) (100) 1978 (With R. Winston) The optics of nonimaging concentrators: light and solar energy. New York: Academic Press.

(40) (103) 1979 (With R. Winston) Geometrical vector flux and some new nonimaging concentrators. J. Opt. Soc. Am. 69, 532–536.

(41) (107) 1980 (With R. Q. Twiss) Adjusting spatially separated plane mirrors to coplanarity. Appl. Optics 19, 2416–2418.

(42) (108) 1980 Theory and principles of optical scanning microscopy. In Scanned image microscopy (ed. E. A. Ash), pp. 165–182. New York: Academic Press.

330 Biographical Memoirs (43) (120) 1986 Aberrations of optical systems. Bristol: Adam Hilger.

(44) (121) 1986 (With F. N. Goodall & R. A. Moody) Reduction photolithography by ablation at wavelength 197 nm. Optics Commun. 57, 227–229.

(45) (127) 1989 (With R. Winston) High collection non-imaging optics. New York: Academic Press.

(46) (128) 1989 (With I. M. Bassett & R. Winston) Nonimaging optics for flux concentration. In Progress in optics (ed. E. Wolf), vol. 26, pp. 161–226. Amsterdam: Elsevier.

(47) (132) 1991 Useful optics (University of Chicago Lectures in Physics). University of Chicago Press
