= Saturday (novel) =

2005 novel by Ian McEwan

- British hardcover edition, with the BT Tower in the background
- Author: Ian McEwan
- Cover artist: Chris Frazer Smith
- Publisher: Jonathan Cape
- Publication date: 2005
- Publication place: United Kingdom
- Media type: Hardback
- Pages: 308
- ISBN: 0-224-07299-4
- OCLC: 57559845

Saturday (2005) is a novel by Ian McEwan. It is set in Fitzrovia, central London, on Saturday, 15 February 2003, as a large demonstration is taking place against the United States' 2003 invasion of Iraq. The protagonist, Henry Perowne, a 48-year-old neurosurgeon, has planned a series of errands and pleasures, culminating in a family dinner in the evening. As he goes about his day, he ponders the meaning of the protest and the problems that inspired it; however, the day is disrupted by an encounter with a violent, troubled man.

To understand his character's world-view, McEwan spent time with a neurosurgeon. The novel explores one's engagement with the modern world and the meaning of existence in it. The main character, though outwardly successful, still struggles to understand meaning in his life, exploring personal satisfaction in the post-modern, developed world. Though intelligent and well read, Perowne feels he has little influence over political events.

The book, published in February 2005 by Jonathan Cape in the United Kingdom and in April in the United States, was critically and commercially successful. Critics noted McEwan's elegant prose, careful dissection of daily life, and interwoven themes. It won the 2005 James Tait Black Memorial Prize for fiction. It has been translated into eight languages.

== Composition and publication ==
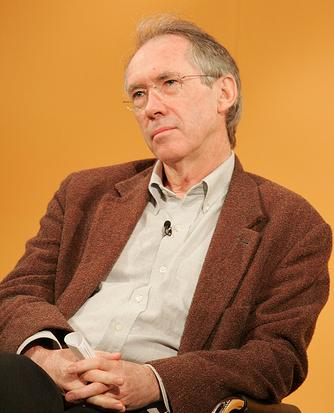
Ian McEwan

Saturday is McEwan's ninth novel, published between Atonement and On Chesil Beach, two works of historical fiction. McEwan has discussed that he prefers to alternate between writing about the past and the present.

While researching the book, McEwan spent two years work-shadowing Neil Kitchen, a neurosurgeon at The National Hospital for Neurology and Neurosurgery in Queen Square, London. Kitchen testified that McEwan did not flinch in the theatre, a common first reaction to surgery; "He sat in the corner, with his notebook and pencil". He also had several medical doctors and surgeons review the book for accuracy, though few corrections were required to the surgical description. Saturday was also proof-read by McEwan's longstanding circle of friends who review his manuscripts, Timothy Garton Ash, Craig Raine, and Galen Strawson.

There are elements of autobiography in Saturday: the protagonist lives in Fitzroy Square, the same square in London that McEwan does and is physically active in middle age. Christopher Hitchens, a friend of McEwan's, noted how Perowne's wife, parents and children are the same as the writer's. McEwan's son, Greg, who like Theo played the guitar reasonably well in his youth, emphasized one difference between them, "I definitely don't wear tight black jeans".

Excerpts were published in five different literary magazines, including the whole of chapter one in the New York Times Book Review, in late 2004 and early 2005. The complete novel was published by the Jonathan Cape Imprint of Random House Books in February 2005 in London, New York, and Toronto; Dutch, Hebrew, German, French, Spanish, Polish, Russian, and Japanese translations followed.

== Synopsis ==
The book follows Henry Perowne, a successful, middle-aged surgeon. Five chapters chart his day and thoughts on Saturday 15 February 2003, the day of the demonstration against the 2003 invasion of Iraq, the largest protest in British history. Perowne's day begins in the early morning, when he sees a burning aeroplane streak across the sky. This casts a shadow over the rest of his day as reports on the television change and shift: is it an accident, or terrorism?

En route to his weekly squash game, a traffic diversion reminds Perowne of the anti-war protests occurring that day. After being allowed through the diversion, he collides with another car, damaging its wing mirror. At first the driver, Baxter, tries to extort money from him. When Perowne refuses, Baxter and his two companions become aggressive. Noticing symptoms in Baxter's behaviour, Perowne quickly recognises the onset of Huntington's disease. Though he is punched in the sternum, Perowne manages to escape unharmed by distracting Baxter with discussions of his disease.

Perowne goes on to his squash match, still thinking about the incident. He loses the long and contested game by a technicality in the final set. After lunch he buys some fish from a local fishmonger for dinner. He visits his mother, suffering from vascular dementia, who is cared for in a nursing home.

After a visit to his son's rehearsal, Perowne returns home to cook dinner, and the evening news reminds him of the grander arc of events that surround his life. When Daisy, his daughter, arrives home from Paris, the two passionately debate the coming war in Iraq. His father-in-law arrives next. Daisy reconciles an earlier literary disagreement that led to a froideur with her maternal grandfather; remembering that it was he who had inspired her love of literature. Perowne's son Theo returns next.

Rosalind, Perowne's wife, is the last to arrive home. As she enters, Baxter and an accomplice 'Nige' force their way in armed with knives. Baxter punches the grandfather, intimidates the family and orders Daisy to strip naked. When she does, Perowne notices that she is pregnant. Finding out she is a poet, Baxter asks her to recite a poem. Rather than one of her own, she recites Dover Beach, which affects Baxter emotionally, effectively disarming him. Instead he becomes enthusiastic about Perowne's renewed talk about new treatment for Huntington's disease. After his companion abandons him, Baxter is overpowered by Perowne and Theo, and knocked unconscious after falling down the stairs. That night Perowne is summoned to the hospital for a successful emergency operation on Baxter. Saturday ends at around 5:15 a.m. on Sunday, after he has returned from the hospital and had sex with his wife again.

== Themes ==
=== Happiness ===
McEwan's earlier work has explored the fragility of existence using a clinical perspective, Christopher Hitchens hails him a "chronicler of the physics of every-day life". Saturday explores the feeling of fulfilment in Perowne: he is respected and respectable but not quite at ease, wondering about the luck that has him where he is and others homeless or in menial jobs. The family is materially well-off, with a plush home and a Mercedes, but justifiably so—Perowne and his wife work hard. McEwan tells of his success rate and keeping cool under pressure; there is a trade off, as he and his wife work long hours and need to put their diaries side by side to find time to spend together.

Perowne's composure and success mean the implied violence is in the background. His personal contentment (at the top of his profession, and, as John Banville finds, "an unashamed beneficiary of the fruits of late capitalism") provides a hopeful side to the book, instead of the unhappiness in contemporary fiction. McEwan's previous novels highlighted the fragility of modern fulfilled life, seemingly minor incidents dramatically upsetting existence. Critic Michiko Kakutani notes that Saturday returns to a theme explored in Atonement, which plotted the disruption of a lie to a middle-class family, and in The Child in Time, where a small child is kidnapped during a day's shopping. This theme is continued in Saturday, a "tautly wound tour-de-force" set in a world where terrorism, war and politics make the news headlines, but the protagonist has to live out this life until he "collides with another fate". Ruth Scurr notes that in Saturday the perspective on the delicate state of humanity that Perowne derives from his medical knowledge is presented in contrast to, and from Perowne's perspective superior to, that of novelists.

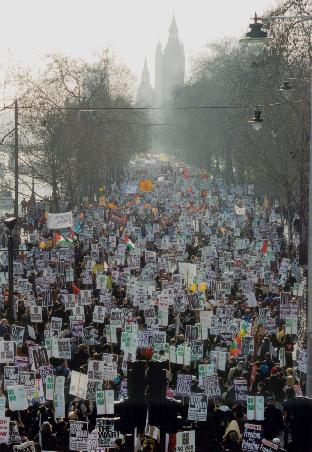
The protest against the Iraq War, in London, February 2003, forms a backdrop to the events of Saturday

=== Political engagement ===
The burning aeroplane in the book's opening, and the suspicions it immediately arouses, quickly introduces the problems of terrorism and international security. The day's political demonstration and the ubiquity of its news coverage provide background noise to Perowne's day, leading to him to ponder his relationship with these events. Christopher Hitchens pointed out that the novel is set on the "actual day the whole of bien-pensant Britain moved into the streets to jeer at George Bush and Tony Blair" and placed the novel as "unapologetically anchored as it is in the material world and its several discontents". The Economist newspaper set the context as a "world where terrorism and war make headlines, but also filter into the smallest corners of people's lives." McEwan said himself, "The march gathered not far from my house, and it bothered me that so many people seemed so thrilled to be there". The characterisation of Perowne as an intelligent, self-aware man: "..a habitual observer of his own moods' [who] is given to reveries about his mental processes," allows the author to explicitly set out this theme.

"It's an illusion to believe himself active in the story. Does he think he's changing something, watching news programmes, or lying on his back on the sofa on Sunday afternoon, reading more opinion columns of ungrounded certainties, more long articles about what really lies behind this or that development, or what is surely going to happen next, predictions forgotten as soon as they are read, well before events disprove them?"

Physically, Perowne is neither above nor outside the fray but at an angle to it; emotionally his own intelligence makes him apathetic, he can see both sides of the argument, and his beliefs are characterised by a series of hard choices rather than sure certainties.

He is concerned for the fate of Iraqis; through his friendship with an exiled Iraqi professor he learned of the totalitarian side of Saddam Hussein's rule, but also takes seriously his children's concerns about the war. He often plays devil's advocate, being dovish with this American friend, and hawkish with his daughter.

=== Rationalism ===
McEwan establishes Perowne as anchored in the real world. Perowne expresses a distaste for some modern literature, puzzled by, even disdaining magical realism:

"What were these authors of reputation doing – grown men and women of the twentieth century – granting supernatural powers to their characters?" Perowne earnestly tried to appreciate fiction, under instruction from his daughter he read both Anna Karenina and Madame Bovary, but could not accept their artificiality, even though they dwelt on detail and ordinariness.

Perowne's dismissive attitude towards literature is directly contrasted with his scientific world-view in his struggle to comprehend the modern world. Perowne explicitly ponders this question, "The times are strange enough. Why make things up?". There is the possibility of irony or hubris in Perowne's presentation, as he does not read novels and throughout the book remarks on his lack of literary education.

Perowne's world view is rebutted by his daughter, Daisy, a young poet. In the book's climax in chapter four, while he struggles to remain calm offering medical solutions to Baxter's illness, she quotes Matthew Arnold's poem Dover Beach, which calls for civilised values in the world, temporarily placating the assailant's violent mood. McEwan described his intention as wanting to "play with this idea, whether we need stories". Brian Bethune interpreted McEwan's approach to Perowne as "mercilessly [mocking] his own protagonist...But Perowne's blind spot [literature] is less an author's little joke than a plea for the saving grace of literature."

Similarly he is irreligious, his work making him aware of the fragility of life and consciousness's reliance on the functioning brain. His morality is nuanced, weighing both sides of an issue. When leaving the confrontation with Baxter, he questions his use of his medical knowledge, even though it was in self-defense, and with genuine Hippocratic feeling. While shopping for his fish supper, he cites scientific research that shows greater consciousness in fish, and wonders whether he should stop eating them. As a sign of his rationalism, he appreciates the brutality of Saddam Hussein's rule as described by the Iraqi professor whom Perowne treated, at the same time taking seriously his children's concerns about the war.

== Genre and style ==
Saturday is a "post 9/11" novel, dealing with the change in lifestyle faced by Westerners after the 11 September attacks in the United States. As such, Christopher Hitchens characterised it as "unapologetically anchored as it is in the material world and its several discontents". "Structurally, Saturday is a tightly wound tour de force of several strands"; it is both a thriller which portrays a very attractive family, and an allegory of the world after 11 September 2001 which meditates on the fragility of life.

In this respect the novel correctly anticipates, at page 276, the 7 July 2005 bombings on London's Underground railway network, which occurred a few months after the book was published:

London, his small part of it, lies wide open, impossible to defend, waiting for its bomb, like a hundred other cities. Rush hour will be a convenient time. It might resemble the Paddington crash – twisted rails, buckled, upraised commuter coaches, stretchers handed out through broken windows, the hospital's Emergency Plan in action. Berlin, Paris, Lisbon. The authorities agree, an attack's inevitable.

The book obeys the classical unities of place, time and action, following one man's day against the backdrop of a grander historical narrative – the anti-war protests happening in the city that same day. The protagonist's errands are surrounded by the recurring leitmotif of hyper real, ever-present screens which report the progress of the plane and the march Perowne has earlier encountered. Saturday is in tune with its protagonist's literary tastes; "magical realism" it is not. The 26-hour narrative led critics to compare the book to similar novels, especially Ulysses by James Joyce, which features a man crossing a city, and Virginia Woolf's Mrs. Dalloway, of which Michiko Kakutani described Saturday as an "up-to-the-moment, post-9/11 variation."

The novel is narrated in the third person, limited point of view: the reader learns of events as Perowne does. Using the free indirect style the narrator inhabits Perowne, a neurosurgeon, who often thinks rationally, explaining phenomena using medical terminology. This allows McEwan to capture some of the "white noise that we almost forget as soon as we think it, unless we stop and write it down." Hitchens highlighted how the author separates himself from his character with a "Runyonesque historical present ("He rises …" "He strides …") that solidifies the context and the actuality."

== Reception ==
It spent a week at No. 3 on both the New York Times Best Seller List on 15 April 2005, and Publishers Weekly (4 April 2005) lists. A strong performance for literary fiction, Saturday sold over 250,000 copies on release, and signings were heavily attended. The paperback edition sold another quarter of a million.

Ruth Scurr reviewed the book in The Times, calling McEwan "[maybe] the best novelist in Britain and is certainly operating at the height of his formidable powers". She praised his examination of happiness in the 21st century, particularly from the point of view of a surgeon: "doctors see real lives fall to pieces in their consulting rooms or on their operating tables, day in, day out. Often they mend what is broken, and open the door to happiness again." Christopher Hitchens said the "sober yet scintillating pages of Saturday" confirmed the maturation of McEwan and displayed both his soft, humane, side and his hard, intellectual, scientific, side. In Literary Review, Matt Thorne wrote "this is an elegant and sophisticated novel, which is beautifully written and creates a wonderful sense of unease".

Reviewers celebrated McEwan's dissection of the quotidian and his talent for observation and description. Michiko Kakutani liked the "myriad of small, telling details and a reverence for their very ordinariness ", and the suspense created that threatens these. Tim Adams concurred in The Observer, calling the observation "wonderfully precise". Mark Lawson in The Guardian said McEwan's style had matured into "scrupulous, sensual rhythms," and noted the considered word choice that enables his work. Perowne, for example, is a convincing neurosurgeon by the end of the book. This focus allowed McEwan to use all the tricks of fiction to generate "a growing sense of disquiet with the tiniest finger-flicks of detail".

The construction of the book was noticed by many critics; Scurr praised it, describing a series of "vivid tableaux", but John Banville was less impressed, calling it an assembly of discrete set pieces, though he said the treatment of the car crash and its aftermath was "masterful", and said of Perowne's visit to his mother: "the writing is genuinely affecting in its simplicity and empathetic force." From the initial "dramatic overture" of the aircraft scene, there were "astonishing pages of description", sometimes "heart-stopping", though it was perhaps a touch too artful at times, according to Michael Dirda in The Washington Post. Christopher Hitchens said that McEwan delivered a "virtuoso description of the aerodynamics of a squash game," enjoyable even "to a sports hater like myself", Banville said he, as a literary man, had been bored by the same scene. Zoe Heller praised the tension in the climax as "vintage McEwan nightmare" but questioned the resolution as "faintly preposterous".

Banville wrote a scathing review of the book for The New York Review of Books. He described Saturday as the sort of thing that a committee directed to produce a 'novel of our time' would write, the politics were "banal"; the tone arrogant, self-satisfied and incompetent; the characters cardboard cut-outs. He felt McEwan strove too hard to display technical knowledge "and his ability to put that knowledge into good, clean prose".

Saturday won the James Tait Black Prize for fiction, and was nominated on the long-list of the Man Booker Prize in 2005.

== Radio dramatisation ==
A 10-part abridgement of Saturday by Alison Joseph, read by Robert Glenister, was broadcast of BBC Radio 4 Extra in 2016.

== Cultural influence ==
Songwriter Neil Finn of Crowded House was reading Saturday when he wrote "People Are Like Suns" for the Time on Earth album (2007). Finn was struck by the image of "a man on his balcony watching a plane go down", and this inspired the beginning of the lyrics.

== See also ==
- September 11, 2001 attacks in popular culture
