= The Comfort of Strangers =

1981 novel by Ian McEwan

- First edition (publ. Jonathan Cape); Cover art: Turner, Grand Canal Venice After Sunset, 1839
- Author: Ian McEwan
- Publisher: Simon & Schuster
- Publication date: June 1, 1981
- ISBN: 0679749845

The Comfort of Strangers is a 1981 novel by British writer Ian McEwan. It is his second novel, and is set in an unnamed city (though the detailed description strongly suggests Venice). Harold Pinter adapted it as a screenplay for a film directed by Paul Schrader in 1990 (The Comfort of Strangers), which starred Rupert Everett, Christopher Walken, Helen Mirren and Natasha Richardson. The film is set in Venice.

== Plot summary ==
Mary and Colin are an English couple on holiday abroad in an unnamed city. Mary is divorced with two children; Colin is her angelically handsome lover who has been with her for seven years. Although they do not usually live together, their relationship is deep, passionate and intimate, but they seem to be bored.

One evening, the couple gets lost among the canals and is befriended by a forceful native named Robert, who takes them to a bar. Later, he insists on bringing them to his house where they meet his wife Caroline. Although the guests are at first shown great hospitality, it becomes clear that the hosts have a peculiar relationship with each other – Robert is the product of a sadistic upbringing and Caroline, who is disabled, has an uncomfortable masochistic view of men as being masters to whom women should yield.

At the beginning of their next meeting, Robert immediately separates Colin and Mary, and takes Colin for a long walk in the city. As they are walking, Robert talks exclusively to men, all in a language that Colin doesn't understand. Later, Robert informs Colin that he told the men that Colin was his lover.

Meanwhile, Caroline tells Mary about the sado-masochistic relationship she has with Robert. Robert had started to become very violent towards her, especially when they were having sex. Once, he broke her back during sex, the reason for Caroline's enduring pain and limping. Caroline tells Mary that in a way, she enjoyed being hurt and loathed by her husband. Eventually, the couple shared a mutual fantasy of murdering someone. Mary does not comment on what she has learned. Later, Caroline makes tea and leads Mary into her and Robert's bedroom. Mary is surprised to find a wall covered with photographs of Colin. As she slowly begins to understand what Caroline and Robert have in mind with Colin, she starts to feel very tired and falls asleep.

Shortly afterwards, Colin and Robert return from their walk and Colin notices something is wrong with Mary. Caroline has laced the tea with a drug that paralyzes Mary but leaves her able to see. With Mary being unable to move or warn Colin, he is unaware what is going to happen to him. She watches helplessly as Robert and Caroline start to touch Colin and kiss him, whereupon Robert slits Colin's wrist with a razorblade. As a result, Colin bleeds to death; Mary loses consciousness. She later awakens in the hospital and discovers that Robert and Caroline are gone, having taken all their belongings with them.

The police later inform Mary that such crimes are common.

== Themes ==
McEwan's novel explores the desultory closeness that exists between Mary and Colin. They have known each other for seven years and "often forget that they are two separate people". As well as being an expression of their love, this closeness makes them weak and puerile. It causes them pain, and enables Robert to take advantage of them.

The disturbing climax of the narrative suggests that McEwan is concerned with two main themes. First, the sadistic behaviour of Robert and the subservience of Caroline are manifestations of a raw and haunting human sexuality. Second, Robert's acts are placed in the context of his childhood, suggesting that his family upbringing with a domineering, authoritarian father, submissive mother and older, more powerful sisters, was responsible for his behaviour.

== Reception ==
McEwan scholar David Malcolm argues that reviews for The Comfort of Strangers were positive, noting that James Campbell of New Statesman praised it as a "fine novel" and that a number of critics (including Anthony Thwaite) deemed it superior to McEwan's previous novel The Cement Garden (1978). In the London Review of Books, Christopher Ricks wrote that "McEwan’s tale is as economical as a shudder" and discussed the alarm of English critic John Ruskin about the ubiquity of death in modern novels, arguing that “the cutting force of the story is in its laying bare how ineradicable is this shock that it should be the mostly inoffensive and mostly respectable whom such horrors befall." Ricks lauded the ending as emotionally affecting.

However, the novel received unfavorable reviews from some American reviewers. A writer for Kirkus Reviews stated that although the "first half promises important fiction", the book ends in a "a kinky, symbolic sexual situation which is neither effective as storytelling nor freshly resonant as metaphor”. The reviewer argued, "McEwan seems to be a huge talent constricted by the need to preach, philosophize, or work out private obsessions; and one can only hope that writing beguiling but disappointing essay-stories like this one will free him to write more wide-ranging, full-visioned fiction in the future." Stephen Koch of The Washington Post wrote, "It is better written [than The Cement Garden]. The elegance of McEwan's [readability] and technical skill – invariably much admired – have been brought to a higher luster and intricacy. [...] McEwan proceeds through most of this sickly tale with subtlety and promise." However, the reviewer also argued that "all this skill is directed toward a climax which, even though it is duly horrific, is sapped by a certain thinness and plain banality at its core", writing that the short story "Psychopolis" from McEwan's collection In Between the Sheets covers the same themes more effectively.

In The New York Times, the critic John Leonard called McEwan "one of the few English writers of fiction who belong these days to a dark Europe; he is a Samuel Beckett with some genital organization", but said that Thomas Mann had already written the novel – Death in Venice – and that Mann's book was better. Leonard argued, "No reader will begin The Comfort of Strangers and fail to finish it; a black magician is at work. [...] And yet everything that is erotic is also sick. [...] this novel, by a writer of enormous talent, is definitely diseased."

In a 2010 article for The Daily Beast, Lucas Wittman listed The Comfort of Strangers as one of the best of McEwan's pre-Atonement works, writing, "McEwan perfectly captures the thrill of travel when one is divorced from familiar surroundings and the chance of something unusual and out-of-character seems possible. Of course, this being a McEwan fiction, the possibility is a brutal truth about how people find love in extreme ways." In 2014, Eileen Battersby of The Irish Times tied it (with The Cement Garden) for fifth place in her list of McEwan's best works.
