= Cockroach (disambiguation) =

A cockroach is an insect of the order Blattodea.

(The) Cockroach may also refer to:

== Books ==
- Cockroach (novel), a 2008 novel by Rawi Hage
- The Cockroach (novella), a 2019 novella by Ian McEwan
- Cockroaches (novel), the second novel in the Harry Hole series by Jo Nesbø
- Cockroaches (memoir), a 2006 memoir by Scholastique Mukasonga

== Film and television ==
- Cockroach (2010 film), a 2010 film by Luke Eve
- "Cockroaches" (CSI episode), an episode of CSI: Crime Scene Investigation
- Walter Bradley, aka Cockroach, a character in The Cosby Show

== Music ==
- Cockroach (album), a 2001 album by Danger Danger
- Cockroaches (EP), a 1987 EP by Voivod
- The Cockroaches, an Australian band in the 1980s
- The Cockroaches, a pseudonym used by The Rolling Stones

== Other ==
- The Cockroach (comics), a fictional character
- Cockroach Labs, software company that sells CockroachDB
- Cockroach, a dehumanization nickname for protester or citizen
- The Indian Cockroach Janta Party, or Cockroach movement, a youth-based political movement

== See also ==
- Kockroach, a 2007 novel by William Lashner under the name "Tyler Knox"
- Raghav Juyal (born 1991), Indian dancer and actor, known as "Crockroaxz"
