= Sweet Tooth (novel) =

2012 novel by Ian McEwan

- Cover of the United Kingdom first edition
- Author: Ian McEwan
- Cover artist: Chris Frazer Smith
- Language: English
- Publisher: Jonathan Cape
- Publication date: 21 August 2012
- Publication place: United Kingdom
- Pages: 336 pages
- ISBN: 0224097377

Sweet Tooth is a novel by the English writer Ian McEwan, published on 21 August 2012. It deals with the experiences of its protagonist, Serena Frome, during the early 1970s. After graduating from Cambridge she is recruited by MI5, and becomes involved in a covert programme to combat communism by infiltrating the intellectual world. When she becomes romantically involved with her mark, complications ensue.

McEwan wanted to write a novel dealing with the social turmoil of the 1970s, and Sweet Tooth is to a large extent based on his own life. The story explores the relationship between artistic integrity and government propaganda, and addresses competing approaches to literature; the boundary between reality and fiction is tested throughout. The novel is dedicated to McEwan's late friend Christopher Hitchens. He is not referred to directly in the book, but he did play a part as the host of a real-life literary event fictionalised in the book, involving McEwan and Martin Amis, who does appear in the story. Critical reception was mixed; some reviewers found the novel moving and poignant, while others saw it as weaker than much of McEwan's previous work.

== Plot summary ==
The plot is set in early-1970s England. Serena Frome ("rhymes with plume"), the daughter of an Anglican bishop, shows a talent for mathematics and is admitted to the University of Cambridge. But she struggles academically, and graduates with a third. While at Cambridge she becomes romantically involved with Tony Canning, a professor, who before abruptly ending the affair secures a position for Serena with MI5. The job is low-level, but a more exciting opportunity appears when Serena is offered a chance to take part in a new covert programme codenamed "Sweet Tooth". To counter Communist propaganda during the Cold War, the agency wants to offer financial assistance to young writers, academics and journalists with an anti-Communist bent. Serena, who is an avid and quick reader of fiction, is given the task of vetting burgeoning writer Thomas Haley.

Serena is immediately taken by Haley's published short fiction. She travels to the University of Sussex, where he works, to offer him a stipend from the fictional Freedom International Foundation. Soon the two begin a romantic affair, but things gradually start to unravel. Serena discovers that Professor Canning (who, it turns out, broke off their affair only because he knew he was dying from cancer) was in fact a Soviet spy, and she was recruited because the agency wanted to keep tabs on Canning. Then, when Haley's first novel comes out, it is a great critical success, but its dystopian, anti-capitalist theme is not well received by the agency. Finally, his affair with Serena is exposed by the press, and the whole Sweet Tooth programme is threatened.

Serena fears that she has lost Haley's love forever, now he knows she has deceived him. Haley, however, had known about the programme for months, and instead of ending the affair, had decided to turn the story into a novel. The reader now discovers that the author of Sweet Tooth is in fact Haley, despite its being written from Serena's first-person perspective. As the novel ends, Haley asks Serena in a letter to marry him.

== Autobiographical elements ==
Several reviewers have pointed out that the Thomas Haley character shares many traits and biographical details with the author. Like Haley, McEwan studied at the University of Sussex (later also at the University of East Anglia), and not at one of the more prestigious Oxbridge universities. Haley's stories, summarised briefly in the novel, are in several cases strikingly similar to some of McEwan's earlier work. This goes particularly for Haley's dystopian début novel, which closely follows the plot of "Two Fragments", a short story from McEwan's 1978 In Between the Sheets. The novel wins Haley the fictional Jane Austen Prize for Fiction, just as McEwan's debut First Love, Last Rites was rewarded with the Somerset Maugham Award in 1976. Several of McEwan's acquaintances from this period also make cameo appearances in the novel, including his friend Martin Amis, his first publisher Tom Maschler, and his mentor Ian Hamilton.

McEwan has been open about the autobiographical elements in the book, and has called it "a muted and distorted autobiography" and "a muted, or transmuted, memoir of myself as a young writer." There are, however, significant differences between author and character. Haley is both an academic and a writer of fiction, while McEwan has been a professional author for his entire career. The intelligence agency plot is also completely fictional; there was never a scheme such as the one described in the book run by MI5. As McEwan says himself, "unfortunately a beautiful woman never came into my room and offered me a stipend."

== Genre and style ==
I said I didn’t like tricks, I liked life as I knew it recreated on the page. He said it wasn’t possible to recreate life on the page without tricks.

— Sweet Tooth, ch. 14

Sweet Tooth is a love story, a spy novel, and a book about literature itself. Serena and her boyfriend Haley – she a well-read but uncritical lover of literature, he a highly accomplished writer and literary scholar – have different attitudes towards literature. Serena prefers a realist approach, where life in the book reflects real life. Haley on the other hand is of a more modernist school, and enjoys experimentation in his work. McEwan plays with these differences, firstly by placing himself in the novel and blurring the line between author and character, and secondly by writing what appears to be a straight first-person narrative, only to distort this perception at the very end.

== Themes ==
McEwan had long wanted to write a novel about the 1970s, a formative period in his life he refers to as "the time of my life." For the United Kingdom it was a turbulent period, with striking miners, energy crisis, escalation of the conflict over Northern Ireland, repeated states of emergency and several shifts of government. It was also the period of the Cold War, when Western governments were trying to win the war of ideas against a highly radicalised intelligentsia. Operation Sweet Tooth is entirely fictional, but the story is inspired by the actual scandal affecting the conservative literary magazine Encounter, which in 1967 was revealed to have received covert funding from the CIA. McEwan uses this back-story to explore the relationship between artist and government, and the need for literature to remain independent. According to McEwan, the problem was not the anti-Communist crusade itself, but the secrecy with which it was conducted. "All that's really required is that anything the state does in relation to the arts is laid on the table where we can see it."

== Critical reception ==
Julie Myerson of The Observer enjoyed the "Russian doll" of the novel's multiple layers, and its "keen emotional pull." Though she had certain misgivings, she felt that the last few pages answered all her questions and "moved [her] almost to tears." Lucy Kellaway of the Financial Times was taken by the stories within the story, and though they tended to "suck vivacity from the main narrative", she saw this as a device to illuminate the "different crafts of writing short stories and novels." Benjamin Errett, writing for the National Post, pointed out how McEwan had blended spy fiction and literary criticism to a combination that was both exciting and intellectually stimulating. In reference to Serena and Tom's different literary preferences, he concluded that "[t]his novel is juicy enough to satisfy them both."

Other reviewers were less enthusiastic. The Daily Telegraph's Catherine Taylor found the protagonist "a little too credulous." She also found McEwan's "wilful narrative sadism" sadly missing from the work. The review in The Economist was even more critical: referring to Sweet Tooth as "not Mr McEwan's finest book", the reviewer concluded that by the end, "it is hard to feel much of anything for these heroes, who are all notions and no depth." James Lasdun of The Guardian found that there were "momentous political questions" raised in the earlier parts of the novel, which were not fully addressed by the end. Stylistically, Serena found herself caught in exactly the kind of narrative she disliked, but, asked Lasdun, "to what end?" The ending of the book was especially polarising. Kellaway saw it as "a good excuse to go back to the beginning and read this rich and enjoyable novel all over again", while another reviewer confessed that, though the ending "might be enough to send McEwan acolytes scurrying back through the novel to see how he did it ... it made me want to throw the book out the window."

The statistical journal "Significance" analyses McEwan's representation of the famous mathematical conundrum: the Monty Hall Problem.
