= Nutshell (novel) =

2016 novel by Ian McEwan

- First UK edition
- Author: Ian McEwan
- Cover artist: Suzanne Dean (design) with detail from Five Views of a Foetus in the Womb by Leonardo da Vinci
- Language: English
- Publisher: Jonathan Cape
- Publication date: 2016
- Publication place: United Kingdom
- Media type: Print (Hardcover)
- Pages: 208 pages
- ISBN: 978-038-554207-4

Nutshell is the 14th novel by English author and screenwriter Ian McEwan published in 2016. It alludes to William Shakespeare’s Hamlet and re-imagines the plot from the perspective of an eight-month-old unborn foetus in London in 2015.

The novel centres around the themes of betrayal, love, hopelessness and the complexities of human relationships. Nevertheless, there is a dark humorous tone throughout the novel which is implemented through McEwan's use of playful and witty descriptions.

The allusions to Hamlet are made notable from the epigraph which quotes a line from Act II Scene II in Hamlet "Oh God, I could be bounded in a nutshell and count myself a king of infinite space – were it not that I have bad dreams."

== Plot ==
The story begins with the uncanny line: "So here I am, upside down in a woman". Considering the narrator is an unnamed unborn foetus, everything is narrated from his (he describes himself as his father's son) limited point of view. In a crafty manner, the narrator gains knowledge from listening to what is going on outside the womb. From this information, he builds a rough understanding of the world around him. Consequently, on several occasions in the text, the narrator comments on current affairs, politics and literature, after learning about them from podcasts and the radio that his mother, Trudy, listens to.

As the story progresses, the narrator figures out that his mother and her lover Claude - who also happens to be the narrator's uncle - are planning on murdering the narrator's father, John. Eventually, the pair are successful in poisoning him.

As a result of this dreadful reality, the narrator experiences feelings of existential dread which are developed both in reaction to this domestic crisis but also from listening to the news and understanding the uncertain times that await him. At one point, following John's murder, the narrator even attempts suicide by choking himself with his umbilical cord to escape this nightmare but fails. In a book review published by The Guardian, Kate Clanchy wrote: "Trapped in the womb rather than his dreams, this Hamlet suffers his story in reverse: he wonders if he should be born rather than if he should die; he starts with his father’s life and goes on to his ghost; he begins in silence but ends in chaos."

The climax of the book takes place when the narrator's frustration and feeling of helplessness has reached its limit, so he decides to initiate his own birth to prevent Trudy and Claude from escaping: "I’ve come to a decision. Enough. My amniotic sac is the translucent silk purse, fine and strong, that contains me. It also holds the fluid that protects me from the world and its bad dreams. No longer. Time to join in. To end the endings. Time to begin."

Although the narrator seems to be an intelligent conscious individual, this heavily conflicts with the implausibility of the narrative's perspective. To answer this question we can refer to when McEwan referenced Henry James in 2005 when being interviewed by writer Zadie Smith: "in the contract between writer and reader, one thing we must accept as given is the subject matter: I accept wholly. It’s a great contract. There’s nowhere you’ll not let your imagination go". According to McEwan, it is assumed that when reading a work of fiction the reader must be willing to suspend their disbelief, and therefore, accept this narratorial presence.

== Origins ==
Interviewing McEwan for The Wall Street Journal, Michael W. Miller explained: "The idea for the extremely unusual narrator of Ian McEwan's new novel Nutshell first came to him while he was chatting with his pregnant daughter-in-law. "We were talking about the baby, and I was very much aware of the baby as a presence in the room," he recalls. He jotted down a few notes, and soon afterward, daydreaming in a long meeting, the first sentence of the novel popped into his head: "So here I am, upside down in a woman."

Although the allusions to Hamlet are fairly obvious, in an interview by The Australian, McEwan admitted that "[he] didn’t really intend to write a version of Hamlet."

== Critical reception ==
In The Guardian, Kate Clanchy began by admitting: "This may not sound like an entirely promising read: a talking foetus could be an unconvincing or at least tiresomely limited narrator, and updatings of Shakespeare often strain at their own seams. From the start, though, McEwan manages to establish both the groggy, gripping parameters of the uterus—'My limbs are folded hard across my chest, my head is wedged into my only exit. I wear my mother like a tight-fitting cap'—and that this foetus, Hamlet-style, is 'king of infinite space'". She found the book's retelling of Hamlet to have "a strong forward momentum" and to be not only a "brutally effective" thriller, "but many other sorts of book too". Despite finding some faults with the novel's social satire, characterisation, and portrayal of contemporary life, she concluded that "... the architecture wins. This book is organised so thoroughly, in its plot, characters and themes, around the central image of the foetus suspended in the churnings of gravity and time [...]. Like TS Eliot's "Marina", also a riff on Shakespeare, it is a consciously late, deliberately elegiac, masterpiece, a calling together of everything McEwan has learned and knows about his art."

Also writing for The Guardian, Tim Adams noted: "There have been plenty of novels inspired by Hamlet—Iris Murdoch's The Black Prince, John Updike's Gertrude and Claudius, even David Foster Wallace's Infinite Jest. And there have been one or two novels told in the voice of foetuses in the womb—Carlos Fuentes's Christopher Unborn, for example. But Ian McEwan's virtuoso entertainment is almost certainly the first to combine the two." He added, "Biology was always Hamlet's destiny—'The time is out of joint. Oh cursed spite, that ever I was born to set it right'—but never has it seemed quite so graphically chromosomal." Adams found the book to be "both alive with wild and whirling wordplay and capable of all sorts of antic dispositions" but warned that "As with all novels based on self-consciously clever conceits, the danger is always self-consciously clever conceit".

The Financial Times's Christopher Tayler judged that "The central gimmick, however, is that the novel is narrated from inside the Gertrude-figure's womb by her nearly due and highly loquacious son. [... A]nd what follows is clearly generated by the technical challenges implicit in the opening sentence, rather than a story that McEwan urgently needs to tell." He decided that "Interspersed throughout the text are extended soliloquies on the general theme of 'the time is out of joint'. Global warming, the erosion of Enlightenment values, the rise of competing nationalisms: the narrator has heard about all these, and more, thanks to Trudy's love of the World Service. ... As you'd expect, these musings are fitted into McEwan's now-standard dramatic opposition between muddled artiness and cold rationality, and injected with a dose of irony. But there's no mistaking Nutshell for a young man's novel." Whilst judging McEwan to be "a master of suspense to just about keep a reader wondering how he's going to resolve the new book's murder plot without doing too much violence to his source material", Tayler concluded that "... the high-wire act doesn’t really come off. McEwan's usual strengths—imaginative precision, narrative placement and control of story dynamics—can make even slim works like On Chesil Beach (2007) oddly resonant. Nutshell relies instead on pure voice and quickly collapses into a mishmash of pentameter-ridden sentences and half-baked wordplay."

John Boyne writing in The Irish Times judged Nutshell to be McEwan's "most intriguing book since that novella [On Chesil Beach], recalling the darker short stories of his early career, the illicit family relationships that make up The Cement Garden, and the complex and deceitful relationships between men and women that lie at the heart of The Comfort of Strangers."
