= Black Dogs =

1992 novel by Ian McEwan

- First edition cover
- Author: Ian McEwan
- Cover artist: Daov Moores
- Language: English
- Publisher: Jonathan Cape
- Publication date: 1 July 1992
- Publication place: United Kingdom
- Media type: Print (Hardcover)
- Pages: 178 pages
- ISBN: 0-224-03572-X
- OCLC: 26400027
- LC Class: PR6063.C4 B5 1992b

Black Dogs is a 1992 novel by the British author Ian McEwan. It concerns the aftermath of the Nazi era in Europe, and how the fall of the Berlin Wall in the late 1980s affected those who once saw Communism as a way forward for society. The main characters travel to France, where they encounter disturbing residues of Nazism still at large in the French countryside. Critical reception was polarized.

== Plot ==
June and Bernard join the Communist Party after their marriage following World War II. Their goal is to dedicate their lives to the pursuit of a utopian communist society through active involvement in socialist politics. Despite their privileged backgrounds and refined education, they have limited practical life experience.

During their honeymoon across war-torn Europe, the couple witnesses the devastating aftermath of the war firsthand, which deeply affects them. Bernard, an atheist, responds with despair and seeks solace in idealistic political ideologies. Meanwhile, June has a frightening encounter with two aggressive black dogs, an event that triggers her conversion to belief in God. From that day forward, the loving couple's relationship begins to deteriorate, as they remain married and in love but grow increasingly divided on the existence of God.

== Reception ==
Black Dogs divided critics. M. John Harrison of The Times Literary Supplement lauded the book as "compassionate without resorting to sentimentality, clever without losing its honesty, an undisguised novel of ideas which is also Ian McEwan's most human work." Poet Craig Raine billed it as "a novel whose formal perfection was so subtle that most critics failed to notice." An anonymous reviewer in The Observer declared Black Dogs to be McEwan's best book yet, as did Andrew Billen. In Entertainment Weekly, writer Gary Giddens said, "McEwan's narratives are small and focused, but resonate far into the night."

A writer for Kirkus Reviews stated, "McEwan explores the personal consequences of political ideas in this remarkably precise little novel. His lapidary prose neatly disguises his search for transcendence.” A reviewer for Publishers Weekly argued that for some the pivotal scene may be unconvincing because McEwan "is rather too didactic in the exposition of his theme”. However, the reviewer also said the work remains "impressive; McEwan's meticulous prose, his shaping of his material to create suspense, and his adept use of specific settings [...] produce a haunting fable about the fragility of civilization, always threatened by the cruelty latent in humankind.”

Edward P. McBride of The Harvard Crimson praised McEwan's psychological insight and argued, “Black Dogs challenges us to confront the tension we all feel in the meeting of science and religion, the rational and the irrational. McEwan crafts the work subtly, weaving the same uncertainty through prose and plot.” In the London Review of Books, Graham Coster complained that the final section's authoritative account is inconsistent with the "relativistic collage of verdicts over the preceding pages", and also criticized certain climactic encounters for the novel's narrator as areas where "McEwan’s metaphysical inquiry shrinks to [...] a knowing wink of, You can’t rule it out, can you?" But Coster also described the philosophical conflict between Bernard and June as a source of considerable pathos, and wrote that the author "shares Forster's sensitivity to landscape as a numinous protagonist [...] McEwan’s prose evokes [the menacing environment where June is attacked] with tender precision.”

In The New York Times, critic Michiko Kakutani stated that "McEwan dexterously opens out his story onto a political and philosophical level" but skates briskly over these larger implications of the story after doing so. Kakutani said that the reader is ultimately “intrigued and provoked but also vaguely undernourished", describing the novel as "absorbing yet vexing”. Amanda Craig wrote in the Literary Review that while Black Dogs had potential to be "a pleasing essay on the ambiguous nature of memory and desire, or the real and the ideal," it ultimately "gets lost in portentous [...] polemic." James Saynor of The Observer derided the book as "wan and fractured" and the characterization as "schematic".

Conversely, Zadie Smith in 2005 dubbed Black Dogs a "brilliant, flinty little novel, bursting with big ideas". The following year, Roger Boylan wrote that the novel is "the most thought-provoking" of McEwan's books and that it deserved the Booker Prize more than Amsterdam (1998). Academic Bob Corbett lauded the novel in 2016 as "a disturbing, challenging, chilling and gripping read. [...] It touches me in a very personal manner." In 2018, Tina Jordan and Susan Ellingwood of The New York Times listed it as one of McEwan's six "noteworthy" works.

== Bibliography ==
- Malcolm, David (2002). Understanding Ian McEwan. Univ of South Carolina Press. ISBN 978-1-57003-436-7.
