= Ian McEwan =

British novelist and screenwriter (born 1948)

Ian McEwan CH CBE FRSA FRSL
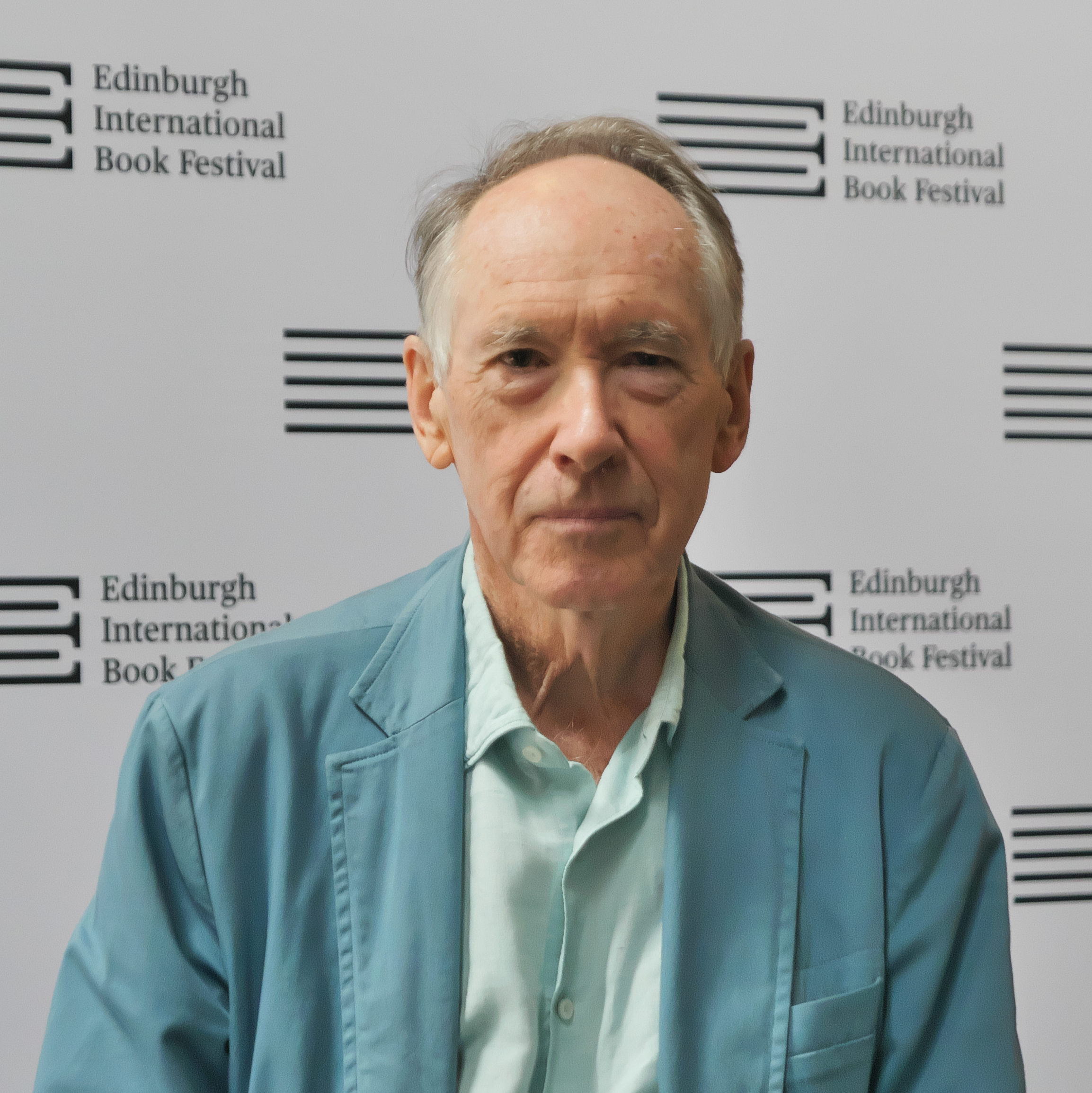
- McEwan in 2025
- Born: Ian Russell McEwan; 21 June 1948 (age 78); Aldershot, Hampshire, England
- Education: University of Sussex; University of East Anglia
- Occupations: Novelist, screenwriter
- Spouse(s): Penny Allen (m. 1982; div. 1995) Annalena McAfee (m. 1997)
- Children: 2
- Writing career
- Period: 1975–present
- Website: ianmcewan.com

Ian Russell McEwan CH CBE FRSA FRSL (born 21 June 1948) is a British novelist and screenwriter. In 2008, The Times featured him at number 35 on its list of "the 50 greatest British writers since 1945", and The Daily Telegraph ranked him number 19 out of "the 100 most powerful people in British culture".

McEwan began his career writing sparse, Gothic short stories. His first two novels, The Cement Garden (1978) and The Comfort of Strangers (1981), earned him the nickname "Ian Macabre". These were followed by three novels of some success in the late 1980s and early 1990s. His 1997 novel Enduring Love was adapted into a film of the same name. He won the Booker Prize with Amsterdam (1998). He was awarded the 1999 Shakespeare Prize.

His next novel, Atonement (2001), garnered acclaim and was adapted into an Oscar-winning film featuring Keira Knightley and James McAvoy. He received the 2011 Jerusalem Prize. His later novels have included The Children Act, Nutshell, and Machines Like Me. His latest novel, about climate change, is What We Can Know.

== Early life and education ==
McEwan was born in Aldershot, Hampshire, on 21 June 1948, the son of David McEwan and Rose Lilian Violet (née Moore). His father was a working-class Scotsman who had worked his way up through the army to the rank of major.

McEwan spent much of his childhood in East Asia (including Singapore), Germany, and North Africa (including Libya), where his father was posted. His family returned to England when he was 12 years old. He was educated at Woolverstone Hall School in Suffolk; the University of Sussex, where he received a degree in English literature in 1970; and the University of East Anglia, where he undertook a master's degree in literature (with the option to submit creative writing instead of a critical dissertation).

== Career ==
=== 1975–1987: Short stories and "Ian Macabre" phase ===
McEwan's first published work was a collection of short stories, First Love, Last Rites (1975), which won the Somerset Maugham Award in 1976. He achieved notoriety in 1979 when the BBC suspended production of his play Solid Geometry because of its supposed obscenity. His second collection of short stories, In Between the Sheets, was published in 1978. The Cement Garden (1978) and The Comfort of Strangers (1981), his two earliest novels, were both adapted into films. The nature of these works caused him to be nicknamed "Ian Macabre". These were followed by his first book for children, Rose Blanche (1985), and a return to literary fiction with The Child in Time (1987), winner of the 1987 Whitbread Novel Award.

=== 1988–2007: Mainstream success and Booker Prize win ===
After The Child in Time, McEwan began to move away from the darker, more unsettling material of his earlier career and towards the style that would see him reach a wider readership and gain significant critical acclaim. This new phase began with the publication of the mid-Cold War espionage drama The Innocent (1990), and Black Dogs (1992), a quasi companion-piece reflecting on the aftermath of the Nazi era in Europe and the end of the Cold War. McEwan followed these works with his second book for children, The Daydreamer (1994).

Enduring Love (1997), about the relationship between a science writer and a stalker, was popular with critics, although it was not shortlisted for the Booker Prize. It was adapted into a film in 2004. In 1998, he won the Booker Prize for Amsterdam. His next novel, Atonement (2001), received considerable acclaim; Time magazine named it the best novel of 2002, and it was shortlisted for the Booker Prize. In 2007, the critically acclaimed film Atonement, directed by Joe Wright and starring Keira Knightley and James McAvoy, was released in cinemas worldwide. His next work, Saturday (2005), follows an especially eventful day in the life of a successful neurosurgeon. Saturday won the James Tait Black Memorial Prize for 2005. His novel On Chesil Beach (2007) was shortlisted for the 2007 Man Booker Prize and was adapted into a film starring Saoirse Ronan in 2017, for which McEwan wrote the screenplay. McEwan has also written a number of produced screenplays, a stage play, children's fiction, and an oratorio and a libretto titled For You with music composed by Michael Berkeley.

In 2006, McEwan was accused of plagiarism; specifically that a passage in Atonement (2001) closely echoed a passage from a memoir, No Time for Romance, published in 1977 by Lucilla Andrews. McEwan acknowledged using the book as a source for his work. McEwan had included a brief note at the end of Atonement, referring to Andrews's autobiography, among several other works. The incident recalled critical controversy over his debut novel The Cement Garden, key elements of the plot of which closely mirrored some of those of Our Mother's House, a 1963 novel by British author Julian Gloag, which had also been made into a film. McEwan denied charges of plagiarism, claiming he was unaware of the earlier work. Writing in The Guardian in November 2006, a month after Andrews' death, McEwan professed innocence of plagiarism while acknowledging his debt to the author of No Time for Romance. Several authors defended him, including John Updike, Martin Amis, Margaret Atwood, Thomas Keneally, Kazuo Ishiguro, Zadie Smith, and Thomas Pynchon.

=== 2008–present: Political works and continued acclaim ===
McEwan's first novel of the 2010s, Solar, was published by Jonathan Cape and Doubleday in March 2010. In June 2008 at the Hay Festival, McEwan gave a surprise reading of this work-in-progress. The novel includes "a scientist who hopes to save the planet" from the threat of climate change, with inspiration for the novel coming from a Cape Farewell expedition McEwan made in 2005 in which "artists and scientists ... spent several weeks aboard a ship near the north pole discussing environmental concerns". McEwan observed: "The novel's protagonist Michael Beard has been awarded a Nobel prize for his pioneering work on physics, and has discovered that winning the coveted prize has interfered with his work." He said that the work was not a comedy: "I hate comic novels; it's like being wrestled to the ground and being tickled, being forced to laugh", instead, that it had extended comic stretches.

Solar was followed by McEwan's twelfth novel, Sweet Tooth, a meta-fictional historical novel set in the 1970s, and was published in late August 2012. In an interview with The Scotsman newspaper to coincide with publication, McEwan revealed that the impetus for writing Sweet Tooth had been "a way in which I can write a disguised autobiography". He revealed in an interview with The Wall Street Journal, in November 2012, that the film rights to Sweet Tooth had been bought by Working Title Films – the company that had adapted Atonement as a film. Sweet Tooth was followed two years later by The Children Act, which concerned High Court judges, UK family law, and the right to die.

Two years after The Children Act, McEwan's 2016 novel Nutshell, a short novel closer in style and tone to his earlier works, was published. McEwan's next work, a short novella, was titled My Purple Scented Novel – part of which was published previously as a short story by the same title in The New Yorker in 2016. This short work was published to mark McEwan's 70th birthday in June 2018. McEwan followed Nutshell in April 2019 with the alternate history/science fiction novel Machines Like Me. It concerns artificial intelligence and an alternate history in which Great Britain loses the Falklands War and the Labour Party, led by Tony Benn, eventually wins the 1987 UK general election. In September 2019, McEwan announced a quick surprise follow-up novella inspired by Brexit, The Cockroach. McEwan published his novel Lessons in 2022 to much critical acclaim. Andrew Billen of The Times calls it McEwan's "500-page masterpiece", and The New Statesman claims the novel "may well be remembered as one of the finest humanist novels of its age".

In 2025, McEwan published his 18th novel What We Can Know, which follows the academic Tom Metcalfe. Set in a 2120 dystopia, Metcalfe and a companion search for a long-lost poem. The book received positive reviews from several critics, including Dwight Gardner of The New York Times, who described the book as the best written by the author in years.

== Style, themes and influences ==
McEwan's work has often explored psychological tension, moral complexity, and the consequences of seemingly small actions. His early short stories and novels, such as First Love, Last Rites and The Cement Garden, earned him a reputation for unsettling and gothic themes. As his career progressed, McEwan shifted toward broader socio-political subjects and more nuanced emotional landscapes. Atonement, for instance, reflects on memory, guilt, and historical trauma, while Saturday probes post-9/11 anxiety through the lens of one day in the life of a neurosurgeon. His later works, such as Solar and Machines Like Me, incorporate speculative and satirical elements, tackling topics like climate change and artificial intelligence. Across his oeuvre, McEwan is noted for precise prose, formal control, and an interest in scientific as well as literary themes. He cites Edward Slingerland's What Science Offers the Humanities as an influence:

I would like to inhabit a glorious mental space in which books like Slingerland’s would not need to be written. In other words – and this comes back to the notion of mental freedom – your average literary intellectual, just as much as your average research scientist, would take for granted a field of study in which the humanities and sciences were fluid, or lay along a spectrum of enquiry. This is the grand enlightenment dream of unified knowledge. If you think of the novel as an exploration or investigation into human nature, well, science undertakes a parallel pursuit.

Among poets, he cites the influence of Philip Larkin: "His poems are part of my mental furniture." He says John Updike "has been a very important writer for me, the one I’ve admired most, read most, and returned to most often."

== Honours and awards ==
McEwan has been nominated for the Booker Prize six times to date, winning the prize for Amsterdam in 1998. His other nominations were for The Comfort of Strangers (1981, shortlisted), Black Dogs (1992, shortlisted), Atonement (2001, shortlisted), Saturday (2005, longlisted), and On Chesil Beach (2007, shortlisted). McEwan also received nominations for the International Booker Prize in 2005 and 2007. He is a Fellow of the Royal Society of Literature (FRSL), a Fellow of the Royal Society of Arts (FRSA), a Fellow of the Society of Authors, and a Fellow of the American Academy of Arts and Sciences. He was awarded the annual Shakespeare Prize by the Alfred Toepfer Foundation, Hamburg, in 1999. He is also a Distinguished Supporter of Humanists UK. He was appointed Commander of the Order of the British Empire (CBE) in the 2000 New Year Honours for services to literature. In 2005, he was the first recipient of Dickinson College's Harold and Ethel L. Stellfox Visiting Scholar and Writers Program Award, in Carlisle, Pennsylvania. In 2008, McEwan was awarded the honorary degree of Doctor of Literature by University College London, where he had previously taught English literature.

In 2006, the Board of Trustees of the Kenyon Review honoured McEwan with the Kenyon Review Award for Literary Achievement, writing that "McEwan's stories, novels, and plays are notable for their fierce artistic dramas, exploring unanticipated and often brutal collisions between the ordinary and the extraordinary". In 2008, The Times named McEwan among their list of "The 50 greatest British writers since 1945". In 2010, McEwan received the Peggy V. Helmerich Distinguished Author Award. The Helmerich Award is presented annually by the Tulsa Library Trust.

On 20 February 2011, McEwan was awarded the Jerusalem Prize for the Freedom of the Individual in Society. He accepted the prize, despite controversy and pressure from groups and individuals opposed to the Israeli government. McEwan responded to his critics, and specifically the group British Writers in Support of Palestine (BWISP), in a letter to The Guardian, stating in part, "There are ways in which art can have a longer reach than politics, and for me the emblem in this respect is Daniel Barenboim's West-Eastern Divan Orchestra – surely a beam of hope in a dark landscape, though denigrated by the Israeli religious right and Hamas. If BWISP is against this particular project, then clearly we have nothing more to say to each other". McEwan's acceptance speech discussed the complaints against him and provided further insight into his reasons for accepting the award. He also said he will donate the amount of the prize, "ten thousand dollars to Combatants for Peace, an organisation that brings together Israeli ex-soldiers and Palestinian ex-fighters".

In 2012, the University of Sussex presented McEwan with its 50th Anniversary Gold Medal in recognition of his contributions to literature. In 2014, the Harry Ransom Center at the University of Texas paid $2 million for McEwan's literary archives. The archives include drafts of all of his later novels. In 2018, McEwan was awarded the Bauer-Incroci di civiltà prize in Venice for his literary career. In 2019, McEwan received the Golden Plate Award of the American Academy of Achievement.

In 2020, McEwan was awarded the Goethe Medal, a yearly prize given by the Goethe-Institut honouring non-Germans "who have performed outstanding service for the German language and for international cultural relations". According to the jury, McEwan's literary work ("Machines like us") is "imbued with the essence of contradiction and critical, depth-psychological reflection of social phenomena". Despite harsh attacks in his own country, the writer "openly defends himself against narrow-minded nationalisms" and appears as a passionate pro-European. He was appointed Member of the Order of the Companions of Honour (CH) in the 2023 Birthday Honours for services to literature.

== Views ==
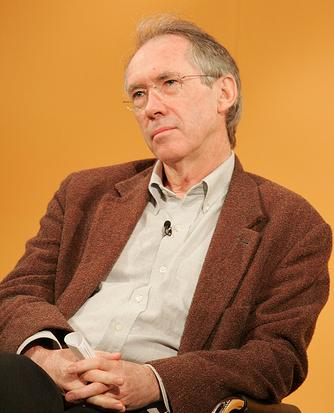
Ian McEwan

=== Religion ===
In 2008, McEwan publicly spoke out against Islamism for its views on women and on homosexuality. He was quoted as saying that fundamentalist Islam wanted to create a society that he "abhorred". His comments appeared in the Italian newspaper Corriere della Sera to defend fellow writer Martin Amis against allegations of racism. McEwan, an atheist, said that certain streams of Christianity were "equally absurd" and that he did not "like these medieval visions of the world according to which God is coming to save the faithful and to damn the others". McEwan put forward the following statement on his official site and blog after claiming he was misinterpreted:

Certain remarks of mine to an Italian journalist have been widely misrepresented in the UK press, and on various websites. Contrary to reports, my remarks were not about Islam, but about Islamism – perhaps 'extremism' would be a better term. I grew up in a Muslim country – Libya – and have only warm memories of a dignified, tolerant and hospitable Islamic culture. I was referring in my interview to a tiny minority who preach violent jihad, who incite hatred and violence against 'infidels', apostates, Jews and homosexuals; who in their speeches and on their websites speak passionately against free thought, pluralism, democracy, unveiled women; who will tolerate no other interpretation of Islam but their own and have vilified Sufism and other strands of Islam as apostasy; who have murdered, among others, fellow Muslims by the thousands in the market places of Iraq, Algeria and in the Sudan. Countless Islamic writers, journalists and religious authorities have expressed their disgust at this extremist violence. To speak against such things is hardly 'astonishing' on my part (Independent on Sunday) or original, nor is it 'Islamophobic' and 'right-wing' as one official of the Muslim Council of Britain insists, and nor is it to endorse the failures and brutalities of US foreign policy. It is merely to invoke a common humanity which I hope would be shared by all religions as well as all non-believers.'

In 2007, Christopher Hitchens dedicated his book God Is Not Great to McEwan. In 2008, McEwan was among more than 200,000 signatories of a petition to support Italian journalist Roberto Saviano who received multiple death threats and was placed in police protection after exposing the Mafia-like crime syndicate, Camorra, in his 2006 book Gomorrah. McEwan said he hoped the petition would help "galvanize" the Italian police into taking seriously the "fundamental matter of civil rights and free speech". McEwan also signed a petition to support the release of Sakineh Mohammadi Ashtiani, an Iranian woman sentenced to death by stoning after being convicted of committing adultery. In 2009, McEwan joined the 10:10 project, a movement that supports positive action on climate change by encouraging people to reduce their carbon emissions.

On winning the Jerusalem Prize in 2011, McEwan defended himself against criticism for accepting the prize in light of opposition to Israeli policies, saying: "If you didn't go to countries whose foreign policy or domestic policy is screwed up, you'd never get out of bed". On accepting the honour, he spoke in favour of Israel's existence, security, and freedoms, while strongly attacking Hamas, Israel's policies in Gaza, and the expansion of Israeli settlements in the occupied territories; these were notable words since the audience included politicians such as the Israeli President Shimon Peres and Nir Barkat, the mayor of Jerusalem. McEwan also personally attended a protest in Sheikh Jarrah against the expansion of Israeli settlements. In 2025, McEwan, alongside Irvine Welsh, Jeanette Winterson and approximately 400 other authors and organisations, co-signed an open letter calling for an immediate ceasefire in Gaza. The letter also describes Israel's military campaign in the territory as "genocidal".

In 2013, McEwan sharply criticised Stephen Hawking for boycotting a conference in Israel as well as the boycott campaign in general, stating that there are many countries "whose governments we might loathe or disapprove of" but "Israel–Palestine has become sort of tribal and a touchstone for a certain portion of the intellectual classes. I say this in the context of thinking it is profoundly wrong of the Israeli government not to be pursuing more actively and positively and creatively a solution with the Palestinians. That's why I think one wants to go to these places to make the point. Turning away will not produce any result." That same year, as part of a wide-ranging interview with Channel 4 News, McEwan discussed the furore that surrounded his remarks on Islamism in 2008, stating: "I remember getting a lot of stick five or six years ago saying something disobliging about jihadists. There were voices, particularly on the left, that thought anyone who criticised Islamism was really criticising Islam and therefore racist. Well, those voices have gone quiet because the local atrocities committed by Islamists whether in Pakistan or Mali is so self-evidently vile."

In the same interview, McEwan remarked that he felt protesters of the 2003 Iraq War were "vindicated" by what happened subsequently; argued that the chief legacy of the Iraq War was that "sometimes there are things we could do [before that war] which we no longer can" in foreign affairs; stated that at one point prior to the 2003 invasion he had hoped to be able to seek an audience with Tony Blair to persuade him not to go ahead with the war; and as someone who voted for the Liberal Democrats in the 2010 UK general election that the then current coalition government of the United Kingdom should end, stating "Let's either have a Tory government or let Ed Miliband try something different" to try and turn around a country of "great inequity". McEwan is traditionally a Labour Party supporter and said he had his "fingers crossed" that Miliband would become prime minister.

=== Politics ===
Following the referendum on the United Kingdom's membership of the European Union resulting in a win for the Leave or Brexit campaign in June 2016, McEwan wrote a critical opinion article for The Guardian titled "Britain is changed utterly. Unless this summer is just a bad dream", published on 9 July 2016. In the article, McEwan wrote of the consequences of the Brexit vote: "Everything is changed utterly. Or about to be, as soon as your new leader is chosen. The country you live in, the parliamentary democracy that ruled it, for good or bad, has been trumped by a plebiscite of dubious purpose and unacknowledged status. From our agriculture to our science and our universities, from our law to our international relations to our commerce and trade and politics, and who and what we are in the world – all is up for a curious, unequal renegotiation with our European neighbours".

McEwan's piece appeared to conclude with a sense of bewilderment and unease at how events were panning out, anticipating the ascension of Theresa May to the leadership of the Conservative Party and her appointment as prime minister, and noting how the previously unthinkable in British politics had actually happened. McEwan's article was published on 9 July, and May effectively won the 2016 Conservative Party leadership election on 11 July, which precipitated her appointment as prime minister two days later. In May 2017, speaking at a London conference on Brexit, apparently referring to what he believed to be the older demographic of leave voters, McEwan stated that "one and a half million oldsters freshly in their graves" would result in a putative second referendum returning a Remain outcome.

In May 2025, McEwan was among more than 400 authors and organisations who signed an open letter calling for an immediate ceasefire in Gaza and unrestricted humanitarian aid. The letter described Israel’s actions in Gaza as “genocidal”.

== Personal life ==
McEwan lives in London, and has been married twice. His first marriage was to Penny Allen, an astrologer and alternative practitioner, with whom he had two sons. The marriage ended in 1995. Two years later in 1997, McEwan married Annalena McAfee, a journalist and writer who was formerly the editor of The Guardian's Review section.

In 2002, McEwan discovered that he had a brother who had been given up for adoption during the Second World War; the story became public in 2007. The brother, a bricklayer named David Sharp, was born six years earlier than McEwan when their mother was married to a different man. Sharp has the same mother and father as McEwan but was born from an affair that occurred before they married. After her first husband was killed in combat, McEwan's mother married her lover, and Ian was born a few years later. The brothers are in regular contact and McEwan has written a foreword to Sharp's memoir.

McEwan was a long-time friend of the essayist and critic Christopher Hitchens. For the thirtieth anniversary of The Selfish Gene, he proposed a canon of science writing. He discussed "Science's Revelations" with Richard Dawkins on In Our Time. He is a music lover. On Desert Island Discs, his first choice was the Aria from Bach's Goldberg Variations. His book choice was James Joyce's Ulysses: "I can think of no other book in which daily life, ordinary life and poetry meet in such an effortless fusion."

== Bibliography ==
=== Novels ===
- The Cement Garden (1978)
- The Comfort of Strangers (1981)
- The Child in Time (1987)
- The Innocent (1990)
- Black Dogs (1992)
- Enduring Love (1997)
- Amsterdam (1998)
- Atonement (2001)
- Saturday (2005)
- On Chesil Beach (2007)
- Solar (2010)
- Sweet Tooth (2012)
- The Children Act (2014)
- Nutshell (2016)
- Machines Like Me (2019)
- The Cockroach (2019) (novella)
- Lessons (2022)
- What We Can Know (2025)

=== Short stories ===
- First Love, Last Rites (1975) (Collection of short stories)
- In Between the Sheets (1978) (Collection of short stories)
- The Short Stories (1995) (Collection of short stories)
- My Purple Scented Novel (2016 in The New Yorker;
  2018 as a booklet commemorating McEwan's 70th birthday)

=== Children's fiction ===
- Rose Blanche (1985)
- The Daydreamer (1994)

=== Plays ===
- Jack Flea's Birthday Celebration (1976)
- The Imitation Game (1980)

=== Screenplays ===
- The Ploughman's Lunch (1983)
- Soursweet (1988)
- The Good Son (1993)
- On Chesil Beach (2017)
- The Children Act (2017)

=== Oratorio ===
- Or Shall We Die? (1983)

=== Libretto ===
- For You (2008)

=== Film adaptations ===
- Last Day of Summer (1984)
- The Comfort of Strangers (1990)
- The Cement Garden (1993)
- The Innocent (1993)
- First Love, Last Rites (1997)
- Solid Geometry (2002)
- Enduring Love (2004)
- Atonement (2007)
- On Chesil Beach (2017)
- The Children Act (2017)
- The Child in Time (2017)
- Sweet Tooth (in development)

=== Non-fiction ===
- Science (2019)
