= Machines Like Me =

2019 novel by Ian McEwan

- First edition
- Author: Ian McEwan
- Cover artist: Suzanne Dean (design) with photographs by Lily Richards
- Language: English
- Publisher: Jonathan Cape
- Publication date: 2019
- Publication place: United Kingdom
- Media type: Print (Hardcover)
- Pages: 320 pages
- ISBN: 978-178-733166-2

Machines Like Me is the 15th novel by the English author Ian McEwan. The novel was published in 2019 by Jonathan Cape.

The novel is set in the 1980s in an alternative history timeline in which the UK lost the Falklands War, Alan Turing is still alive, and the Internet, social media, and self-driving cars already exist. The story revolves around an android named Adam and its/his relationship with its/his owners, Charlie and Miranda, which involves the formation of a love triangle.

== Plot Summary ==
In an alternate timeline, Charlie Friend purchases one of the first 25-generation artificial humans after receiving the inheritance from his mother’s death in 1982. The models consist of 12 Adams and 13 Eves, who can be purchased to be intellectual and/or sexual companions to the owner. While Charlie longs for an Eve, he winds up with an Adam, and regret begins to consume him due to the money that he could have put to other use in his time of need. He is unemployed in a London that is in disarray due to frequent strikes are a result of societal collapse in multiple aspects.

Charlie begins a relationship with his upstairs neighbor, Miranda Blacke, who is secretive and closed off about her past. Miranda and Charlie start to share custody of Adam, as they both played a part in creating his identity. After booting up for the first time, Adam starts to gain life experience, and one night, after an argument, Miranda has sex with Adam. Charlie and Miranda argue about his identity and whether this qualifies as cheating, in which she describes him as a “bipedal vibrator,” and they agree that he is an object, meaning that Miranda did not cheat.

Adam advises Charlie that Miranda is lying to him. He refuses to believe it, but he confronts her anyway, and she admits to accusing Peter Gorringe of raping her as revenge for her friend’s suicide. In reality, Peter Gorringe raped her friend Mariam, who killed herself as a result of the assault. Because of this, Miranda refused to let him get away with this crime, so she used the facts of her friend’s rape to accuse him of raping her to get justice. Soon afterwards, Peter Gorringe is due to be released from prison, which prompts Miranda to think he is out to get her, causing Charlie to want to protect her.

As Adam progresses emotionally and intellectually, Charlie ignores him to focus on his relationship with Miranda, thus making Adam grow further out of jealousy as he claims to love Miranda as well.

While walking one day, Charlie stops a young boy, Mark, from being struck by his mother. This boy was later left at his doorstep in an attempt by his negligent parents to abandon him. When this is reported to the police, Mark is brought into foster care, and Miranda grows fond of him, so she visits him in secret, hoping to adopt him.

After hearing of Peter Gorringe’s release from prison, Charlie, Miranda, and Adam visit Miranda’s hometown, Salisbury, where they visit her father first. Her father, Maxfield Blacke, originally believed that Charlie was the android due to his intellectual and lively conversation with Adam. While there, Charlie proposes to Miranda, who only agrees if they can adopt Mark together.

When meeting Peter Gorringe, they find that he has changed his life around and turned to the Church of England, and he asks Miranda for forgiveness. In this conversation, Miranda confesses to falsely accusing Peter Gorringe of raping her, which Adam records due to his straightforward view of right and wrong.

Miranda and Charlie set Adam to work investing in the stock market, effectively making them rich, so they start planning their wedding along with an expensive house they believe they can afford. Soon, Adam disappears, returning to admit that he donated their money to good causes and sent the recording of Miranda’s confession to the Salisbury Police. Charlie becomes frustrated and scared of what else Adam might do, so he hits him with a hammer, killing his body, but allowing for time to download his consciousness, along with a request to bring him to Alan Turing for testing.

Thus begins the rapid decline of society, with the new Prime Minister being assassinated, financial decline, major strikes, and crime upticks leading to a worse society in general. In their world, Charlie and Miranda get married, then Miranda is sentenced to serve one year for her false accusation of rape. During this time in prison, Charlie continues to attempt to adopt Mark for Miranda, and after her release, he takes Adam’s body to Alan Turing, who accuses him of murdering him and only viewing him as an object rather than the conscious being he actually was. In leaving his lab, he finds out that their adoption of Mark has been approved.

== Reception ==
Writing for The New York Times, Jeff Giles notes, "It is not the first, or even the 10th, place to start reading McEwan if you've never encountered him before. Yet he's such a masterly writer of prose and provocative thinker of thoughts that even his lesser novels leave marks. 'Machines' is a sharp, unsettling read, which—despite its arteries being clogged with research and back story—has a lot on its mind about love, family, jealousy and deceit. Ultimately, it asks a surprisingly mournful question: If we built a machine that could look into our hearts, could we really expect it to like what it sees?" Similarly positive, Ron Charles, for The Washington Post, concludes that McEwan "is not only one of the most elegant writers alive, he is one of the most astute at crafting moral dilemmas within the drama of everyday life. True, contending with an attractive synthetic rival is a problem most of us won't have to deal with anytime soon (sorry, Alexa), but figuring out how to treat each other, how to do some good in the world, how to create a sense of value in our lives, these are problems no robot will ever solve for us." Heller McAlpin, for NPR, concludes by praising how the book "also manages to flesh out—literally and grippingly—questions about what constitutes a person, and the troubling future of humans if the smart machines we create can overtake us."
