= Solar (novel) =

2010 novel by author Ian McEwan

- Cover of the first edition
- Author: Ian McEwan
- Cover artist: Andy Chatman (photo); Suzanne Dean (design)
- Language: English
- Genre: Satire
- Publisher: Random House
- Publication date: 18 March 2010
- Media type: Print (hardcover)
- Pages: 304
- ISBN: 0-224-09049-6

Solar is a novel by author Ian McEwan, first published on 18 March 2010 by Jonathan Cape, an imprint of Random House. It is a satire about a jaded Nobel-winning physicist whose dysfunctional personal life and cynical ambition see him pursuing a solar-energy based solution for climate change.

== Plot summary ==
Michael Beard is an eminent, Nobel Prize–winning physicist whose own life is chaotic and complicated. The novel takes the reader chronologically through three significant periods in Beard's life: 2000, 2005 and 2009, interspersed with some recollections of his student days in Oxford.

=== 2000 ===
Middle-aged, balding and slightly overweight womanizer Beard falls into a depression after learning that his fifth wife, Patrice, has begun an affair with their builder, a man called Tarpin. Despite being a Nobel award-winning physicist Beard realizes all his best work was done as a young man and now coasts on his reputation heading a research centre in Reading that seeks to harness wind energy. One of the younger researchers at the centre, Tom Aldous, tries to speak to Beard about the potential of solar energy but Beard shuts him down.

After seeing Patrice with a bruise on her face Beard goes to confront Tarpin, but finds himself no match for the man and leaves after causing a scene in front of Tarpin's neighbours. Depressed over his marriage Beard accepts an invitation to go to the Arctic as part of a retreat on climate change. While there he realizes he is the only scientist among groups of artists who believe passionately in climate change (which he remains skeptical of) though they treat him with respect, believing his research in wind-based energy constitutes concrete steps towards combatting global warming.

Beard returns home from his trip deciding to divorce Patrice. Arriving early however he encounters Tom Aldous in his bathrobe. After Beard tells him he will ruin his career Aldous begs him not to imploring him that his research into photosynthesis and solar energy is more important than the feud between the two of them. While pleading for his career Aldous trips on a rug and strikes his head against a coffee table. Beard realizes that if he calls the police he could be blamed for Aldous's death and instead plants evidence of Tarpin's presence.

Tarpin is indeed arrested and convicted of Aldous's murder and Beard is painted in the media as a sympathetic figure who had been cuckolded by his wife. Aldous's research on solar energy is given to Beard as it had been labelled with his name.

=== 2005 ===
By 2005, Beard is experiencing a career resurgence due to his research into solar energy which in actuality was the research of Tom Aldous. Beard no longer works for the government having been fired after giving a press conference in which he stated that the lack of women in science was due to the natural limitations of their gender. The ensuing anger into his comments caused a media storm and resulted in his womanizing past being scrutinized in the press.

He has a sexual relationship with a younger woman named Melissa who owns a string of dance supply shops whom he deliberately refuses to marry despite her desire for a child. Returning home from a trip Melissa informs Beard that she is currently pregnant having stopped taking birth control pills. Beard is angry and tries to think of ways to convince Melissa to have an abortion.

=== 2009 ===
Beard is now a father, and sixty-two years old. He is not in the best of health, and is worried about a suspicious-looking lesion on his wrist. His solar power plant is in the final stages of construction in Lordsburg, New Mexico, where he has acquired another girlfriend, Darlene, a waitress. Darlene wants to marry him, but he has a very comfortable set-up with Melissa and his three-year-old daughter, Catriona. All his problems culminate on the eve of the opening ceremony for his solar power plant. Tarpin is out of jail and turns up looking for work, Melissa flies to New Mexico with his daughter to try and win him over from Darlene, a patent lawyer arrives with proof that he stole his ideas from the now-dead Aldous, his doctor confirms the lesion on his hand is cancerous, his business partner abandons him to multimillion-dollar debts, and then he learns that somebody (presumably Tarpin) has sabotaged his power plant by smashing the solar panels. In the final scene Beard gets an "unfamiliar, swelling sensation" in his heart which he interprets as love for his daughter, but may well be the onset of a heart attack.

== Background ==
The novel is primarily a work of fiction but draws heavily on references to real science and modern history.

Michael Beard's trip to the Norwegian Arctic island of Spitsbergen is based on a 2005 trip McEwan made with art and climate change organisation, Cape Farewell. The group of artists and scientists that McEwan travelled with included Antony Gormley and Rachel Whiteread. He later said of the trip:

We spent our evenings discussing [climate change], talking about how the world needed fundamental changes of approach and culture, and at the same time there was this growing chaos in the room next door – the boot room, where all our outdoor gear was stored – our snow mobile suits and so on. It was this disparity between the self-made disorder in our lives on the ship, and our aspirations, our ideals, that suggested that one approach to this subject was through a kind of forgiving humour.

== Reception ==
In 2010, Solar was awarded the Bollinger Everyman Wodehouse Prize, a British literary award for comic writing.
