= Lucilla Andrews =

British writer

Lucilla Matthew Andrews Crichton
- Born: Lucilla Matthew Andrews; 20 November 1919; Suez, Egypt
- Died: 3 October 2006 (aged 86); Edinburgh, Scotland, United Kingdom
- Occupations: Nurse, novelist
- Spouse: James Crichton (1947–1954)
- Children: Veronica Crichton
- Writing career
- Pen name: Lucilla Andrews, Diana Gordon, Joanna Marcus
- Language: English
- Period: 1954–1996
- Genre: Romance

Lucilla Matthew Andrews Crichton (born 20 November 1919 in Suez, Egypt – d. 3 October 2006 in Edinburgh, Scotland) was a British writer of 33 romance novels from 1954 to 1996. As Lucilla Andrews she specialised in hospital romances, and under the pen names Diana Gordon and Joanna Marcus wrote mystery romances.

She was a founding member of the Romantic Novelists' Association, which honoured her shortly before her death with a lifetime achievement award.

== Biography ==
Born Lucilla Matthew Andrews on 20 November 1919 in Suez, Egypt, the third of four children of William Henry Andrews and Lucilla Quero-Bejar. They met in Gibraltar, and married in 1913. Her mother was daughter of a Spanish doctor and descended from the Spanish nobility. Her British father worked for the Eastern Telegraph Company (later Cable and Wireless) on African and Mediterranean stations until 1932. At the age of three, she was sent to join her older sister at boarding school in Sussex.

She joined the British Red Cross in 1940 as a VAD before training as a nurse at St Thomas' Hospital, London, 1941-1944, becoming a registered nurse in December 1944 - all during World War II. In 1947, she retired and married Dr James Crichton, but discovered that he was addicted to drugs. In 1949, soon after their daughter Veronica was born, he was committed to hospital and she returned to full-time nursing by night, while writing by day. In 1952, she sold her first romance novel, published in 1954, the same year that her husband died. She specialised in doctor-nurse and hospital romances, using her personal experience as inspiration.

In 1969, she decided to move to Edinburgh. Her daughter read History at Newnham College, Cambridge, and became a journalist and Labour Party communications adviser, before her death from cancer in 2002.

She was a founder member of the Romantic Novelists' Association in 1960 and an inaugural recipient of their Lifetime Outstanding Achievement Award, in the Scottish Parliament shortly before her death.

Andrews died on 3 October 2006 in Edinburgh, Scotland, UK.

== Atonement controversy ==
In late 2006, Lucilla Andrews' autobiography No Time for Romance became the focus of a posthumous controversy, when it was publicly alleged, most prominently by Andrews' agent, that Ian McEwan plagiarised from this work's description of Andrews' wartime nursing experiences in his 2001 novel Atonement. McEwan denied that he had plagiarised, noting that he had listed Andrews' book in the acknowledgements of his novel and had publicly named it as a source. Andrews herself had been alerted to the connection and similarities between her book and Atonement the year before, but was apparently untroubled.

== Bibliography ==
=== Standalone novels ===
- The Print Petticoat (1954)
- The Secret Armour (1955)
- The Quiet Wards (1956)
- The First Year (1957)
- A Hospital Summer (1958)
- The Wife of the Red-Haired Man (1959)
- My Friend the Professor (1960)
- Nurse Errant (1961)
- Flowers from the Doctor (1963)
- The Young Doctors Downstairs (1963)
- The New Sister Theatre (1964)
- The Light in the Ward (1965)
- A House for Sister Mary (1966)
- Hospital Circles (1967)
- Highland Interlude (1968)
- The Healing Time (1969)
- Edinburgh Excursion (1970)
- Ring O'Roses (1972)
- Silent Song (1973)
- In Storm and in Calm (1975)
- Busman's Holiday (1978)
- The Crystal Gull (1978)
- After a Famous Victory (1984)
- Lights of London (1985)
- The Phoenix Syndrome (1987)
- Frontline 1940 (1990)
- The Africa Run (1993)

=== Endel & Lofthouse Trilogy ===
1. A Few Days in Endel (1967) aka Endel House (originally as Diana Gordon)
2. Marsh Blood (1980) (originally as Joanna Marcus)
3. The Sinister Side (1996)

=== Jason Trilogy ===
1. One Night in London (1979)
2. Weekend in the Garden (1981)
3. In an Edinburgh Drawing Room (1983)

=== Serialised novels ===
- The Golden Hour (Woman and Home; 1955–6)
- The Fair Wind (Woman's Weekly; 1957)
- Pippa's Story (Woman's Weekly; 1968)

=== Omnibus ===
- My Friend the Professor / Highland Interlude / Ring O' Roses (1979)
