= What We Can Know =

2025 novel by Ian McEwan

- Author: Ian McEwan
- Language: English
- Publisher: Jonathan Cape (UK)
- Publication date: 2025
- Publication place: United Kingdom
- Media type: Print
- Pages: 400
- ISBN: 9781787335738

What We Can Know is the 18th novel by author Ian McEwan, published on 18 September 2025 by Jonathan Cape. The novel is set almost a century in the future, in 2119, in a UK partially submerged by rising seas, and is centred on Tom Metcalfe, an academic at the fictional University of the South Downs, who is investigating a lost poem, read aloud at a party in 2014.

McEwan has described the book as a work of science fiction "without the science." In the book, people in 2119 call the first half of the 21st century "the Derangement" because everyone knew about climate change but failed to act.

== Plot ==
What We Can Know unfolds in two contrasting movements.

Part One is set in 2119, in a Britain drastically reduced by climate catastrophe and, it's later implied, a nuclear disaster—much of the former landmass now submerged, populations scattered, states collapsed. Universities persist, though the humanities have been demoted to a marginal, half-respected pursuit. Against this backdrop, literature scholar Thomas Metcalfe is consumed by a single obsession, shared with his partner and fellow researcher Rose Church: the recovery of a lost poem by the (fictional) celebrated 21st-century poet Francis Blundy. Titled A Corona for Vivien, it was a sequence of fifteen interlinked sonnets—a corona of sonnets, in the rare technical sense—composed as a birthday gift for Blundy's wife, Vivien, and read aloud once, at a now-legendary dinner party in 2014, before vanishing. For Thomas, recovering it isn't just scholarship; it's the discovery that could finally secure him the professorship his career has been circling for years. The section closes with a breakthrough: Thomas and Rose track down what remained from the Blundys' former home, now on one of the small islands left of Britain, and there unearth a buried time capsule with a trove of documents and a valuable violin.

Part Two, which is much shorter, pivots entirely in form and voice: a confessional first-person account, reaching back to the real events of the past, that overturns nearly everything Thomas believed he'd reconstructed. It lays bare why the poem was never published—a truth far darker and more damning than the story of artistic modesty or lost manuscripts that Thomas had built his theories around.

The novel's final irony is quiet but pointed: Thomas and Rose do go on to receive their professorships—the very outcome Thomas had been chasing—even though virtually everything they'd concluded about the poem, the marriage, and the dinner turns out to have been wrong. It's a fitting close to a book whose real subject, as the title suggests, is the gap between what we can piece together from fragments and what actually happened. Unreliability of memory itself stressed many times too.

== Reception ==
In an anonymous review appearing pre-publication in Kirkus Reviews, the book was classified as dystopian fiction and described as a "philosophically charged tour de force". Kevin Power of the Guardian saw the book as a commentary on the liberalist movement in the post-Brexit world, noting that McEwan dons the hat of a "liberal critic of liberalism" and "compels us to consider the moral consequences of global catastrophe."

Writing for The New York Times, Dwight Garner called the book "the best thing McEwan has written in ages" and "entertainment of a high order". Garner praised the many themes explored by McEwan, including the meaning of history and legacy.
