= Amsterdam (novel) =

1998 novel by Ian McEwan

- First edition cover
- Author: Ian McEwan
- Language: English
- Genre: Novel
- Publisher: Jonathan Cape
- Publication date: 1 December 1998
- Publication place: United Kingdom
- Media type: Print (hardback & paperback)
- ISBN: 0-385-49424-6
- OCLC: 42992366
- Preceded by: Enduring Love
- Followed by: Atonement

Amsterdam is a 1998 novel by British writer Ian McEwan, for which he was awarded the 1998 Booker Prize.

== Summary ==
Amsterdam is the story of a euthanasia pact between two friends, a composer and a newspaper editor, whose relationship spins into disaster.

== Plot ==
At the funeral of photographer and writer Molly Lane, three of Molly's former lovers converge. They include newspaper editor Vernon Halliday and composer Clive Linley, who are old friends, and British Foreign Secretary Julian Garmony.

Clive and Vernon muse upon Molly's death from an unspecified rapid-onset brain disease that left her helpless and in the clutches of her husband, George Lane, whom they both despise. Neither man can understand her attraction to Julian Garmony, the right-wing Foreign Secretary who is about to challenge his party's leadership.

Shortly after Molly's death, Clive, who is single, begins to ponder what would happen to him if he began to decline in health. He confides in Vernon and asks him to perform euthanasia on him should he ever reach that point. Vernon reluctantly agrees on the condition that Clive do the same for him.

Vernon, whose newspaper is in decline, is given a tip by George, a series of private photographs taken by Molly of Garmony cross-dressing. Vernon decides to use the scandal to unseat Garmony, whose politics he disagrees with. He faces pushback from his editorial staff and the board members of his newspaper about publishing the clearly private pictures. Seeking comfort he brings up the matter to Clive who vehemently disagrees with Vernon's decision to publish.

After their argument, Clive, who has been commissioned to write a symphony for the forthcoming millennium, takes a retreat to the Lake District which has inspired him before. While hiking he comes across a woman being attacked by a man. Rather than intervene, Clive leaves the scene to finish composing the end melody of his symphony. He then returns to his hotel and abruptly leaves for home.

The day that Vernon's paper is due to publish the pictures of Garmony, Vernon reaches out to Clive and the two have a brief conversation where they forgive their differences and Clive tells Vernon what he saw in the Lake District. At work, during an editorial meeting, Vernon realizes that one of his journalists is tracking the story of a rapist in the Lake District and realizes that this is who Clive must have seen. He calls Clive and attempts to force him to go to the police, though Clive declines as he is working on his symphony. Their conversation is interrupted by Garmony's wife holding a press conference where she calls Vernon a flea and calls the pictures a private personal matter, while pretending that she was aware Molly took them. Public opinion turns against Vernon and his paper and he is forced to resign.

Angered by their conversation, Clive sends Vernon a note telling him he should be fired, which Vernon sees after he is fired and views as Clive gloating. He then calls the police to force Clive to give information about the Lake District rapist but is disappointed that Clive will not face criminal charges. Inspired by an article on euthanasia that he sees in his old paper, Vernon decides to lure Clive to Amsterdam and murder him under the grounds he is mentally unwell. Meanwhile, the composition of Clive's symphony is interrupted by the police calling him to the Lake District. With the symphony permanently ruined, Clive also makes the decision to try to lure Vernon to Amsterdam, where he is rehearsing his symphony, to euthanize him on the grounds he is mentally depraved. Both of the murders go through and each man last hallucinates seeing Molly Lane.

Garmony and George Lane are sent out to retrieve the bodies, Garmony on behalf of the government for Clive and George on behalf of Vernon's widow, Mandy. They are under the impression it is a double suicide, caused in part because Clive's symphony was a dud and ends on a heavy plagiarism of "Ode to Joy". Garmony learns it was actually a double murder and informs George, who is pleased. George reflects on the fact that two of Molly's former lovers are dead and Garmony, despite having weathered the scandal, will never be able to rise in the party. He contemplates asking out Vernon's widow Mandy.

== Reception ==
In The New York Times, critic Michiko Kakutani called Amsterdam "a dark tour de force, a morality fable, disguised as a psychological thriller." In The Guardian, Nicholas Lezard wrote, "Slice him where you like, Ian McEwan is a damned good writer" and discussed "the compulsive nature of McEwan's prose: you just don't want to stop reading it." In The New York Times Book Review, critic William H. Pritchard called the book a "well-oiled machine, and McEwan's pleasure in time-shifting, presenting events out of their temporal order (flashing back in Clive's mind, say, to a conversation he had the day before) is everywhere evident. Vladimir Nabokov, asked whether sometimes his characters didn't break free of his control, replied that they were galley slaves, kept severely under his thumb at all times. McEwan follows this prescription in spades."

However, recent appraisals (such as Sam Jordison's in The Guardian) have criticised the novel's plot and perceived sub-par execution.

== Awards ==
Amsterdam received the 1998 Booker Prize. Announcing the award, Douglas Hurd, the former British Foreign Secretary who served as the chairman of the five-judge panel, called McEwan's novel "a sardonic and wise examination of the morals and culture of our time."

== Resources ==
- McEwan, Ian. Amsterdam. New York: Anchor Books, 1999. (ISBN 978-0-385-49424-3).
- Pinaki Roy|Roy, Pinaki. "Rereading Ian McEwan's Amsterdam". The Atlantic Literary Review Quarterly 13(3), July–September 2012: 27–38. (ISSN 0972-3269; ISBN 978-81-269-1788-4).
