= Lessons (novel) =

2022 novel by Ian McEwan

- Author: Ian McEwan
- Cover artist: Tina Berning
- Language: English
- Publisher: Jonathan Cape (UK)
- Publication date: 2022
- Publication place: United Kingdom
- Media type: Print
- Pages: 486
- ISBN: 9781787333970

Lessons is the 17th novel by the author Ian McEwan, published in 2022 by Jonathan Cape. The book is considered by some to be his most autobiographical novel to date with the central character, Roland Baines written as being born in June 1948, the same as McEwan. Another reviewer has described it as a 'boomer parable'.

== Plot ==
The story covers some seventy years of the fictional life of Roland Baines, including his relationships with his parents, siblings and partners, as well as details of his homelife and work against the backdrop of mid 20th century historical events. This includes a focus around the issues when Roland as a 14-year-old schoolboy is seduced by his piano teacher Miss Miriam Cornell and the subsequent effects it has on his life. Global events that affect Roland include decolonization, the Cold War, the Chernobyl disaster, Brexit and COVID-19.
