= The Comfort of Strangers (film) =

1990 Paul Schrader psychological thriller film

- Theatrical release poster
- Directed by: Paul Schrader
- Screenplay by: Harold Pinter
- Based on: The Comfort of Strangers by Ian McEwan
- Produced by: Mario Cotone; Angelo Rizzoli Jr.
- Starring: Christopher Walken; Natasha Richardson; Rupert Everett; Helen Mirren
- Cinematography: Dante Spinotti
- Edited by: Bill Pankow
- Music by: Angelo Badalamenti
- Production company: Sovereign Pictures
- Distributed by: Penta Distribuzione (Italy); Rank Film Distributors (United Kingdom); Skouras Pictures (United States)
- Release dates: 1 September 1990 (Italy); 30 November 1990 (United Kingdom); 15 March 1991 (United States)
- Running time: 107 minutes
- Countries: Italy; United Kingdom; United States
- Language: English
- Box office: $1.2 million £404,175 (UK)

The Comfort of Strangers is a 1990 psychological thriller film directed by Paul Schrader, and starring Christopher Walken, Rupert Everett, Natasha Richardson, and Helen Mirren. The screenplay by Harold Pinter was adapted from the 1981 novel of the same name by Ian McEwan.

It was screened out of competition at the 1990 Cannes Film Festival.

== Plot ==
Unmarried English couple Colin and Mary are vacationing in Venice for a second time. As they meander through the city visiting landmarks, they are surreptitiously photographed by a stranger. Over dinner, Mary questions Colin as to whether he likes her two children, whom she conceived during her last marriage. While wandering through the streets, the couple gets lost. They encounter Robert, an elegant British-Italian man who offers to take them to his bar. Over several bottles of wine, Robert regales the couple with intimate, bizarre details of his life, including stories about his sadistic father, an Italian diplomat, as well as cruel pranks his younger sisters played on him during his childhood. He also recounts how he met his wife, Caroline, the daughter of a Canadian diplomat. Colin and Mary attempt to return to their hotel after their night with Robert, but become lost. Mary suffers a migraine and the two end up sleeping on the streets.

At dawn, the couple awaken and visit a cafe in the square at St Mark's Basilica. There, Mary expresses unease and wishes to abort their vacation. The two are again met by Robert, who apologizes after learning the couple slept on the street. He offers to have them over for a meal at his home, which they accept. The three are taken by a water taxi to Robert's spacious, Moorish-styled apartment, and the couple take a nap. They awaken and are met by Caroline. She tells them Robert has left to work at his bar, and offers Mary food. As Mary spends time with Caroline, she notices that she appears to have a back injury. Caroline confesses to having looked in on the couple while they were sleeping, and remarks on their beauty.

When Robert returns, he continues to unfurl anecdotes about his domineering father and grandfather. When Colin insults Robert in the library, Robert punches him in the stomach. Colin does not tell Mary about the incident. After dinner, Colin and Mary return to their hotel, where they have passionate sex. Later, Mary has a nightmare, and upon waking, admits to Colin that she saw a photograph of him in Robert and Caroline's apartment. While the couple visit the beach later, Colin confesses to Mary how Robert hit him. Colin suggests they get married when they return to England, but Mary is now hesitant about the idea.

While walking through the city, Colin and Mary stumble upon Robert and Caroline's residence by chance. Caroline, out on a balcony, notices them, and calls out for them to come and visit. Caroline and Robert inform the couple that they will be leaving the next day to visit Caroline's family in Canada. Robert insists Colin accompany him on a short trip to tend to his bar, to which he agrees. Caroline stays with Mary at the house, and finds the home is mostly packed. Caroline tells Mary that she and Robert plan to sell it when they return. Over tea, Caroline tells Mary her back injury stems from years of sadomasochistic sex that she and Robert engage in. Meanwhile, Robert tells Colin he is selling his bar. Colin asks Robert why he took photographs of him, but Robert continues to steer the conversation toward anecdotes relating to his family.

Mary begins to suffer vertigo, and suspects she has been drugged. She is escorted by Caroline to a bedroom, where she finds the walls covered in photographs of Colin taken over the course of their vacation. Caroline explains that Robert has been stalking him since the day they arrived, having passed the couple on the street. Robert and Colin return to the house, and Colin is alarmed to find Mary unable to speak. Colin attempts to get the couple to call for a doctor for Mary but they slash his throat with a razor as Mary helplessly watches. As Colin bleeds to death, Robert and Caroline embrace. Later, Mary is questioned by the Italian police before she goes to view Colin's body. As she is escorted out of the police station, Robert and Caroline are interrogated. As the detectives commence their interview with Robert, he begins telling the same story about his father.

== Cast ==
- Christopher Walken as Robert
- Rupert Everett as Colin Mayhew
- Natasha Richardson as Mary Kenway
- Helen Mirren as Caroline
- Manfredi Aliquò as Concierge
- David Ford as Waiter
- Daniel Franco as Waiter
- Rossana Canghiari as Hotel Maid
- Fabrizio Castellani as Bar Manager
- Mario Cotone as Detective
- Giancarlo Previati as First Policeman
- Antonio Serrano as Second Policeman

== Reception ==
Upon release, The Comfort of Strangers received generally mixed reviews from critics. Rotten Tomatoes gives a rating of 54% from 24 reviews. It holds a rating of 61% on Metacritic from 20 reviews. Vincent Canby of the New York Times reviewed the film positively, saying "Mr. Schrader is a director of great rigor and discipline. The movie is fascinated by the baroque behavior it observes, but without imitating it." Roger Ebert gave the film a mixed review, rated it 2.5 stars out of 4, and said:

Paul Schrader sees the story as literate, elegant eroticism. It is based on a novel by Ian McEwan, the best-selling British novelist of the perverse, and the screenplay is by Harold Pinter, so expert at suggesting the terrifying depths beneath innocent words. The actors are well-chosen for this material, particularly Walken, who can project decadence and danger without doing anything in particular to call attention to his methods [...] Perhaps the arbitrary, unfinished nature of the story is part of its purpose. But I felt that characters this interesting should not be allowed to remain complete ciphers.

Peter Travers of Rolling Stone also wrote a generally positive review, commenting that "Schrader is an astute guide through the circuitous byways of sexual manipulation. His hypnotic thriller supplies intelligent pleasures as well as gruesome chills." Slant Magazine gave it 4 stars out of 5, calling it "underrated" in a more recent review.

The film was released on home video by the Criterion Collection in 2020.
