= The Child in Time =

1987 novel by Ian McEwan

- First edition cover
- Author: Ian McEwan
- Cover artist: Leonardo da Vinci, detail from The Virgin and Child with Saint Anne and Saint John the Baptist, 1499-1500
- Publisher: Jonathan Cape
- Publication date: 1987
- Publication place: UK
- Media type: Print hardcover
- Pages: 220
- Awards: 1987 Whitbread Novel Award
- ISBN: 978-0224024990
- Website: www.ianmcewan.com/books/child.html

The Child in Time (1987) is a novel by Ian McEwan. The story concerns Stephen, an author of children's books, and his wife, two years after the kidnapping of their three-year-old daughter Kate.

The Child in Time divided critics. It won the Whitbread Novel Award for 1987 and has sometimes been declared one of McEwan's greatest novels, but others criticise the book as heavy-handed.

== Plot summary ==
Stephen Lewis is, by his own admission, an accidental author of children's books. One Saturday, on a routine visit to the supermarket, during a momentary distraction, he loses his only daughter, Kate, aged three. The only purpose in his life becomes sitting as a member of a government committee on childcare, an activity he does with little to no interest. Otherwise he spends his days lying on the sofa drinking scotch and watching mindless TV programmes and the Olympic games. His wife, Julie, frustrated by her husband’s seemingly futile quest to find Kate, has moved away to the countryside and become a recluse.

Stephen occasionally visits his close friend, Charles Darke, who was in charge of publishing Stephen's first novel and is now a junior Minister in the Cabinet, and a rumoured future candidate for Prime Minister. Darke's wife, Thelma, is a quantum physicist who engages Stephen with her theories on quantum physics, time and space.

At the behest of Thelma, who believes Stephen's marriage with Julie is salvageable, he makes an effort to reconnect with Julie by visiting her. Although he has never visited the town, he feels strangely familiar with the place - especially a pub. There Stephen experiences a strange event that he cannot explain: he sees his parents as a young couple in a pub, before they were married, an event that is later confirmed to have happened by his parents. Though Julie and Stephen temporarily reconnect during his visit and sleep together, Kate's absence has become too great a divider between the two and they part believing it impossible to overcome her loss.

In the meantime, Charles Darke and his wife leave their life in London for a place in the countryside. During Stephen’s visit, Charles expressed his motive for his retreat as a search for an inner child that’s been forbidden and denied. A few years later, Charles, who according to Thelma suffered from bipolar disorder, dies by suicide after being unable to reconcile his political ambitions and drive with his desire for recreating his missed childhood.

The book ends with Stephen finding out Julie had got pregnant during his visit through their emotional tryst, and her giving birth.

== Themes ==
The book deals with the theory that time is relative, and can be fluid and unstructured. In one respect it can be viewed as a time travelling story. At the very core of the novel is the "child in time" — Stephen himself — appearing to his mother as a child's face at a window, which makes his mother decide not to abort, but instead to continue the pregnancy.

It also explores the way both Stephen's and Julie's lives disintegrate after Kate's disappearance, and how an unexpected event at the very end of the book may bring them back together.

== Reviews ==
In Publishers Weekly, The Child in Time was billed as "a beautifully rendered, very disturbing novel", with the reviewer describing the kidnapping scene as "more frightening than any from a horror novel". A reviewer for Kirkus Reviews lauded it as "a work of remarkable intellectual and political sophistication--his most expansive and passionate fiction to date", and argued that the novel shows McEwan to be a writer of "narrative daring and imaginative genius". Judy Cooke argued in The Listener that the novel drew from the major concerns of its decade a "rich, complicated narrative, its ideas embodied in character and situation, its style fluent and witty, engaging the reader's attention on every page." In The Spectator, Brian Martin dubbed it McEwan's best book to that point and "a serious novel which has many levels of intention, and provides many pleasures". Jack Slay also described the book as McEwan's finest in his 1996 study of the author's output.

Other reviews were mixed or negative, however. In the London Review of Books, Nicholas Spice praised McEwan's prose but wrote that the novel "expends its uncommon creative energies on a programme of undistinguished social and philosophical commentary.” Spice compared it unfavourably with an Iris Murdoch book released that year and argued, "Murdoch’s novel ends on a note of foreboding, a dark and open question about what may be coming to term in the womb of time. The Child in Time thinks it knows the answer and offers to play midwife. [...] The novel’s certainty that its values are the right ones, the ones that it is safe to be seen with in public, makes it particularly exasperating to anyone, like myself, who has sponged up the same values from the same cultural pool”.

Michiko Kakutani wrote in The New York Times that McEwan uses “his marvelous control and sympathy as a writer [...] to make Stephen's state of mind so palpable that we are made to share all his shifting emotions”. But the critic also described Kate's disappearance as a "heavy-handed metaphor for his own inability to retrieve his youth" and complained that a number of the book's motifs "feel like afterthoughts grafted onto Stephen and Kate's story and not fully assimilated into the text”. Kakutani found the novel "discursive and uneven". Gabriele Annan wrote in The New York Review of Books that too much of the book is "corn".

In 2002, Adam Begley of The Paris Review listed The Child in Time as the beginning of a period in McEwan's career of novels which are "more ambitious than the earlier books, more thoughtful—and equally vivid". Christopher Hitchens stated in 2005 that he still considered the book McEwan's masterpiece. However, Roger Boylan of the Boston Review wrote that the novel's powerful moments were mainly in the parts centring on Stephen's loss, dismissing the book as "overly earnest in its concern with exposing corruption in high places. The political becomes rather too personal, and the different aspects of The Child in Time undermine rather than support one another. The result is a bit of a mess". In a 2015 article for The Guardian, Aida Edemariam wrote that the novel "made imaginable something I had not imagined before, and could not now un-think: that in a moment, and without reason, everything can change, and change utterly". Eileen Battersby, who had reviewed the novel positively upon its release, again praised it in 2014 as “a very powerful third novel and also the one which first suggested that McEwan [...] was far more than a gifted master of menace. Suddenly it seemed that a humane spine did in fact sustain all the terror.” She listed the novel as second only to the first 200 pages of Atonement (2001) in the author’s oeuvre.

== Adaptation ==
In February 2017, BBC One commissioned a television film adaptation of the novel starring Benedict Cumberbatch and Kelly Macdonald. It premiered on BBC One on 24 September 2017, to positive critical response.
