= Manfredi Aliquò =

Italian actor and voice actor

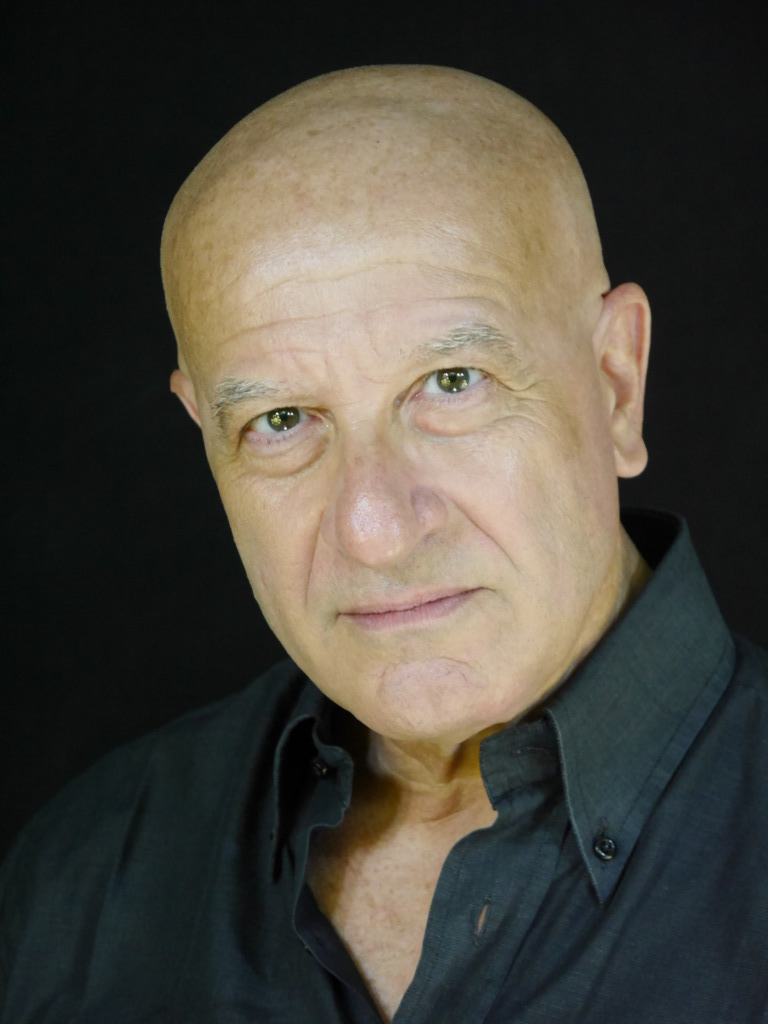
- Aliquò in 2019
- Born: 12 June 1958 (age 67); Rome, Italy
- Occupations: Actor; voice actor
- Years active: 1980–present

Manfredi Aliquò (born 12 June 1958) is an Italian actor and voice actor.

== Biography ==
Born in Rome, Aliquò attended the Silvio D'Amico National Academy of Dramatic Arts and began acting on stage, television and films during the early 1980s. He took part in events such as Festival dei Due Mondi and starred in plays directed by Aldo Trionfo, Pino Quartullo and Gabriele Lavia, among others.

On screen, Aliquò acted in international films such as Elie Chouraqui's Man on Fire and Paul Schrader's The Comfort of Strangers, and he is well known for portraying Castor in the historical drama television series Rome. He even enjoyed success as a voice actor and dubber, and is known for providing the Italian voice of Apu Nahasapeemapetilon in The Simpsons.

== Filmography ==
=== Cinema ===
- The Mass Is Ended (1985) - Hooligan
- Man on Fire (1987) - Policeman
- The Comfort of Strangers (1990) - Concierge
- The Council of Egypt (2002) - Duke of Caccamo
- Ex 2: Still Friends? (2011) - Onorevole Lo Foco

=== Television ===
- La fuggidiva (1983) - TV film
- L'armata Sagapò - TV film (1985)
- Cinema che follia! - variety show (1987)
- Blue Blood - TV series (1988)
- Un bambino in fuga - Tre anni dopo - TV miniseries (1991)
- Un commissario a Roma - TV series (1992)
- Passioni - TV series (1993)
- Pazza famiglia - TV series (1994)
- Il Barone - TV miniseries (1995)
- La voce del cuore - TV miniseries (1995)
- In nome della famiglia - TV miniseries (1997)
- Primo cittadino (1997)
- Gli eredi - TV miniseries (1997)
- Ama il tuo nemico - TV miniseries (1999)
- Incantesimo - soap opera (1999)
- Camici bianchi - TV series (2000)
- Compagni di scuola - TV series (2001)
- La squadra - TV series (2003/07)
- Carabinieri - TV series (2003)
- Ho sposato un calciatore - TV miniseries (2005)
- Rome - TV series (2005/07)
- L'onore e il rispetto - TV series (2006/09)
- Gente di mare - TV series (2007)
- Piper - TV miniseries (2009)
- La nuova squadra - TV series (2010)
- A fari spenti nella notte - TV film (2012)
- Provaci ancora prof! - TV series (2013)

== Voice work ==
| Year | Title | Role | Notes |
|---|---|---|---|
| 1992 | Jesus: A Kingdom without Frontiers | Machir | Animated film |
| 1999 | The Legend of the Titanic | Chinese mouse | Animated film |
| 2000 | Sandokan - La tigre ruggisce ancora | Sindhia | Documentary |
| 2002 | The Prince of Dinosaurs (Original title: Il principe dei dinosauri) | Sigfrido | Animated film |
| 2004 | Tentacolino | Chinese mouse | Animated film |
| 2004 | La storia di Leo | Drill | Animated film |
| 2006 | Sandokan - Le due tigri | Kiom | Animated film |
| 2014 | Spike Team | Juri Chechi | Animated series |

=== Dubbing roles ===
==== Animation ====
- Apu Nahasapeemapetilon and other voices in The Simpsons, Apu Nahasapeemapetilon in The Simpsons Movie and Family Guy
- Ambrister Minion in Ratatouille
- Andy Dick in Where My Dogs At?
- The Royal Advisor in Minions
- Mr.Wilter in ChalkZone

==== Live action ====
- Zit Boy in Liar Liar
- Teddy Pollack in Best Men
- National Enquirer photographer in The Birdcage
- Chapeau in Beauty and the Beast
- Boothe in Deadpool
- Mutant Organiser in X-Men: The Last Stand
- Detective McCann in American Gangster
- Saul Mineroff in The Infiltrator
- Shayes in Mercury Rising
- William Tompkins in Bridge of Spies
- Frank in Road to Perdition
- Tom Wallace in Scream 3
- Store Clerk in Dead Again

=== Video games ===
- Apu Nahasapeemapetilon in The Simpsons Game
