= Rose Blanche (novel) =

1985 picture book story by Roberto Innocenti

- First edition
- Author: Roberto Innocenti
- Language: French
- Published: 1985 (Script Éditions)
- Media type: Print (Hardback)
- Pages: 36 pp
- ISBN: 2-83120001-6

Rose Blanche is a 1985 picture book children's story by Italian illustrator Roberto Innocenti concerning wartime experiences of the title character, a young German girl.

== Authorship ==
Roberto Innocenti is shown as author on all covers of the different editions of this book. However, in a number of published versions Christophe Gallaz or Robert McEwan are shown as co-authors along with Innocenti.

Rose Blanche version published with co-authors as Innocenti and Gallaz.

Rose Blanche version published with co-authors as Innocenti and McEwan.

Innocenti produced the illustrations which make up the large majority of page space in all cases. Gallaz wrote the accompanying French text. This text was subsequently translated into many different languages for publication around the world. This included an English translation for the version published in the USA. However, in the UK publication, the English text was written by Ian McEwan and does not correspond to that of Gallaz.

== Plot ==
Rose Blanche is a young girl who lives in a German town at the time of the Second World War. The local people are enthusiastic as the war begins. Rose Blanche however is horrified to happen upon children who are imprisoned and starving in a camp close to her village. She smuggles food to them even as reversals in the war bring severe privations. As the fighting reaches the camp, she is killed in the crossfire, never to be found by her mother.

== Illustrations ==
The book features 22 pictures created by Roberto Innocenti, whose work has been described as "wonderfully meticulous, painterly and often sumptuous".

Rose Blanche appears in fifteen of the pictures. She is specifically identifiable by a bright red ribbon in her hair, which contrasts with the relatively drab colours which dominate most of the other scenes.

The complete list of pictures may be described as follows:

- Cover - Rose at her window - wounded soldiers reflect in the glass
- Title page - Rose running down a muddy rural lane carrying a bag
- Picture 1 - A crowd including Rose cheer men leaving to go to war
- Picture 2 - A tank goes through the town where people queue for food
- Pictures 3 & 4 - Rose goes to school and walks by the river as normal
- Picture 5 - Rose sees a boy try to escape from a broken down truck
- Picture 6 - The boy is recaptured by a soldier and Nazi officials
- Picture 7 - Rose sees the boy bundled back with others in the truck
- Picture 8 - Rose follows the truck through the town
- Picture 9 - Rose follows further into a restricted area of forest
- Picture 10 - Rose goes through the trees to a barbed wire fence
- Picture 11 - Imprisoned is a crowd in striped uniforms bearing yellow stars
- Picture 12 - At home Rose is furtively putting food in her bag
- Picture 13 - Rose is rushing away from school with her bag
- Picture 14 - Rose gives food to the children through the electric fence
- Picture 15 - Rose sees wounded dispirited soldiers pass through town
- Picture 16 - A chaotic scene of soldiers and townspeople evacuating
- Picture 17 - Disheveled Rose puts a flower on the barbed wire of the destroyed prison camp while soldiers are fighting nearby
- Picture 18 - An army with Red Star insignia occupy the ruined town
- Picture 19 - Flowers flourish on the broken prison camp fortifications
- Inside back page - The flower Rose placed on the barbed wire has withered

== Title ==
Rose Blanche is the French translation of the German "Die Weiße Rose" which means in English "The White Rose". It was the name of a group of young intellectual Germans, who protested non-violently against the Nazi regime and the Second World War. They were executed in 1943.

== Themes ==
Robert Innocenti describes in the book's introduction how, as a small child during the Second World War in Italy, he lived through events that he did not fully understand but left him feeling that "something terrible was happening". It was this personal experience that led him to create his drawings. He states "in this book I wanted to illustrate how a child experiences war without really understanding it" and so his intention was to illustrate how The Holocaust might have been experienced by a German child in the immediate vicinity of its perpetration.

Due in particular to its potentially upsetting conclusion, the book is generally not recommended for children below the age of 8.

Historical Association finds a general consensus as appropriate for those between the ages of 9 and 11.

The subject matter and the quality and detail of the illustrations make it of more general interest for adults too. Furthermore, the subsequent renown of co-author Ian McEwan gives the work a broader potential readership than at the time of its original publication.

The apparent themes presented by this book may then vary when considered in respect to these different readership groups, as discussed by Patty Campbell in The New York Times. For adults this is an examination of virtue in the face of evil and good deeds performed even at the risk of terrible personal repercussions. For the actual target child age group, Campbell writes that a "fairy tale is evoked in the theme of an evil thing found in the woods". While the child reader may be able to feel unconsciously that "redemption through compassion is implied by the girl's martyrdom", without knowledge of the actual facts "this is a story full of puzzles and intimations of unnamed horrors". As such it does invoke the same feelings experienced by the illustrator himself during the war.

== Development of the novel ==
Innocenti proposed his idea for the book to Italian publishers in the early 1980s. However it was only in 1983 that Swiss organisation Edipresse commissioned the work. For the first published version in 1985, Swiss writer Christophe Gallaz then used Innocent's drafts and notes to create the accompanying text in French. In the same year, the USA publishers used direct translations of Gallaz's words into English. However also in 1985, for the UK version the author Ian McEwan wrote a completely new interpretation.

It was not until 1990 that "Rosa Bianca" was finally published in Innocenti's native tongue.

== Critical reception ==
=== Favourable ===
There is general admiration shown for the quality of the illustrations in this book. As Natalia Bragaru writes:

"Roberto Innocenti is known for his hyperrealistic and highly detailed painterly style, as is amply evident in "Rose Blanche". His style can not be mistaken for anybody else's, instantly recognisable are his delicate palette, refined draughtsmanship and interesting compositions".

For this and his other works, Innocenti received the Hans Christian Andersen Illustrator Award in 2008.

When considered in conjunction with the various accompanying text versions, the book has received significantly polarised reviews. The illustrator Quentin Blake rates it among his top seven children's books and is quoted as describing it in The Independent as "a modern fairy tale that does not flinch at reality".

A typical positive education-oriented rating is delivered by Critical Literacy Book Reviews, with a favourable comparison is made to the young adult novel The Boy in the Striped Pyjamas as it deals with a similar subject matter but is more accessible for younger readers.

Natalia Bragaru also lists several awards that it received.

=== Unfavourable ===
However reviews from those critics with a significant academic interest into the relevant subject matter are more circumspect. The author and professor of children's literature Michael Rosen says that he dislikes the book because: "The book is illustrated in a hyper-real way, almost as if we are looking at photographs, but the ending is almost a negation of that, primarily because it refuses to show death".

The novel had adhered to the tenet that "children's books should offer hope or restitution" however "had done so in the least appropriate circumstance: in relation to the Holocaust".

Nina Barrett in Los Angeles Times expresses particular concerns for the intended audience. She writes that "the publisher acknowledges that some parents may find the book "inappropriate" for the 7-and-up age group it is going to be marketed to".

The New York Times concurs that age suitability is debatable. In this regard given the likely target audience, this is viewed as a "deeply problematic work" which lacks "the catharsis of confrontation with the full truth". It is wrong to leave the young reader in the same position as the young author: lacking a real understanding of the terrible things that had happened.

Some readers consider the central premise of the novel to be simply implausible as the prison guards would have not allowed Rose to repeatedly pass food through the camp fence.

=== Analysis of variations in accompanying text ===
A further important aspect that has received critical attention is the significance of textual interpretations in the various language versions. Most attention centres on the different approaches presented by Christophe Gallaz and Ian McEwan. For example, for the first half of the story Gallaz adopts a first person perspective, beginning the story with the words "My name is Rose Blanche". He then switches to the third person as she approaches her demise. In contrast McEwan writes exclusively as the observer, for example on the first page saying "Rose Blanche was shivering with excitement".

Bragaru feels that "Gallaz describes what Rose sees in short simple sentences. It allows the reader to stand with her at that moment and observe what she is experiencing". Whereas "McEwan's text is coloured by a distant perspective of past events and what is known of their consequences. It's like he doesn’t trust the reader to interpret Innocenti's illustrations through their lens of reference".

Emer O'Sullivan concurs writing "McEwan doesn’t trust the visual narrative to tell its story, or the readers to decipher it, and reduces the pictures to mere illustrations of his verbal text".

Hiller and McCann agree writing: "The two versions also show us how the combination of text and picture position the reader's encounter with the story … In the British version it is somewhat like watching a movie in which the film-maker is concerned to make the message impinge upon the audience". Whereas Gallaz allows the "depictions to do their work and uses the words to refine what we see".

Susan Stan extends the analysis to compare the Gallaz text, as translated into English for the US publication, both with that of McEwan and additionally with the German version by Abraham Teuter.

O'Sullivan expands upon this, identifies at least 10 translations, then proceeds "to examine the French, American, English, German, Spanish, and Italian versions to question how cultural differences are inscribed into these, even though the pictorial narrations are identical".

An example of an interesting deviation is identified in the German version. In prior language versions the town mayor is a merely nameless Nazi fanatic. In Teuter's translation: "Bürgermeister Schröder is given a name and an individual identity". He is then referred to several times and is inferred to have escaped ultimate retribution, in stark contrast to Rose's fate. Such introduced variations in perspective may have an outcome possibly not initially envisaged by the (Italian) illustrator himself as: "The Italian translation is—with only one small omission—a word-for-word translation of the German”.

=== Educational Resource ===
O'Sullivan's in-depth analysis illustrates the importance academics have attached to assessment of "how acceptable this picture book treatment of the war and Holocaust topic was deemed to be and how translators tried to make it accessible specifically for readers in their languages".

Innocenti's own stated intention in the introduction was that "in this book I wanted to illustrate how a child experiences war without really understanding it". Ultimately none of the differing versions of accompanying text offer the child reader a full explanation, although McEwan has been judged to offer more interpretation than others. This explicit failure to provide the truth has, as noted, angered some critics. However, in contrast, Historical Association considers that it is "profound because it works on several layers at once" and offers a "basis for teaching Key Stage 2 pupils about the Holocaust". This is reflected in the wide variety of educational establishments internationally that have made their associated study materials publicly available.
