= The Cockroach (novella) =

2019 novella by Ian McEwan

- First edition (UK)
- Author: Ian McEwan
- Cover artist: Suzanne Dean
- Language: English
- Publisher: Jonathan Cape (UK); Knopf (Canada); Anchor Books (US)
- Publication date: 2019
- Publication place: United Kingdom
- Media type: Print
- Pages: 100
- ISBN: 1-5291-1292-3

The Cockroach is a satirical novella by the author Ian McEwan, published in 2019 by Jonathan Cape, inspired by Kafka's The Metamorphosis and loosely based on the ramifications of Brexit.

== Background ==
McEwan on the Today Programme, declined an invitation to say something conciliatory about Leave voters. "Let’s stop pretending that there are two sides to this argument," he says. "There aren't. I'm sorry. When I'm abroad and people say, 'What the f*** are you doing?' I say, 'I don't know. I wish I could give you some arguments for it."

McEwan doubts The Cockroach will be his last word on the subject. "I think I will get back to it. I probably have to get back to it.” He hopes readers find the novella “therapeutic” but doesn't expect it to change any minds. "I’m afraid the people who like it will probably be Remainers and the people who loathe it will be Brexiters. That's the world we have now. No one’s going to say, ‘I’ve just read The Cockroach and I’m becoming a Remainer.' If only! So I don’t flatter myself that I'm going to have any impact on this process."

== Plot ==
A cockroach takes over the body of the prime minister of the UK and finds itself in 10 Downing Street. All of his cabinet except the foreign secretary are also cockroaches in 'superficial human form'. Instead of Brexit is the theory of Reversalism in which the flow of money is reversed. Workers pay money to their employers, and in turn are paid to shop. Trade functions by exporters giving Britain money to take their goods; Britain will in turn pay other countries to import its products and services.

== Reception ==
Fintan O'Toole in The Guardian praises the novella "It is written to comfort and entertain those who already believe that the Brexit project is deranged. And even in that McEwan faces a formidable challenge. Brexit has such a camp, knowing, performative quality that it is almost impossible to inflate it any further. How do you make a show of people who are doing such a fabulous job of making a show of themselves? McEwan manages to do so with great style and comic panache...McEwan elaborates this great scheme in prose so finely wrought that the plan seems to have some genuine gravity. And this in turn makes it very funny. He cannot hope to laugh the terrible reality of Brexit out of existence, but McEwan’s comic parable at least provides some relief from a political farce that has long gone beyond a joke."

Erik Martiny also praises the novel in The London Magazine, "With politics the main focus of his attention, McEwan gives it all the pizzazz he possesses and with hilarious results. His mastery of free indirect speech allows you to enter the cockroach’s mind in startlingly funny ways." and "a refreshing and imaginative contribution to the genre of magic realism."

Dwight Garner has the opposite view, writing in The New York Times: "The Cockroach is so toothless and wan that it may drive his readers away in long apocalyptic caravans. The young McEwan, the author of blacker-than-black little novels, the man who acquired the nickname “Ian Macabre,” would rather have gnawed off his own fingers than written it. At dark political and social moments, we need better, rougher magic than this...Once McEwan has established his premise, however, The Cockroach stalls. It devolves into self-satisfied, fish-in-barrel commentary about topics like Twitter and the tabloid press...The idea of writing The Cockroach probably seemed, in the shower one morning, like a good one. Later, after coffee, it might have occurred to McEwan that suggesting your opponents are cockroaches might be to drop down to their carpet level.

Robert Shrimsley writing in Financial Times explains "By the end of this short, occasionally elegant and no doubt cathartic fictional essay, McEwan has inadvertently given readers a fresh insight into the arrogance and contempt that liberal society feels towards those who have dared to defy it by voting for Brexit. For all the flourishes one would expect from a novelist of McEwan’s brilliance, this falls way short of his usual standard...This is the McEwan we expect; playful, inventive and clever. The descriptions of physical transformation are unsurprisingly excellent though he is not the first author to riff on Kafka’s classic. But as soon as he returns to the pure politics, the intelligence gives way to unfiltered and uninquisitive rage. What a shame. A cold-headed, forensic McEwan on Brexit would have been worth reading.
