= In Between the Sheets =

1978 collection of short stories by Ian McEwan

First edition cover (publ. Jonathan Cape)

In Between the Sheets (1978) is the second collection of short stories by British writer Ian McEwan.

== Context ==
The collection is McEwan's second book and second collection of short stories, and was regarded by the author (along with his first collection, First Love, Last Rites) as an opportunity to experiment and find his voice as a writer. In an interview with Christopher Ricks in 1979, McEwan commented, "They were a kind of laboratory for me. They allowed me to try out different things, to discover myself as a writer."

== Stories ==
- "Pornography" is about a two-timing pornographer. His medical nurse lovers eventually trap him and tie him to the bed. The story ends as the two women prepare to perform a penectomy on him in revenge for his having passed on venereal disease to them.
- "Reflections of a Kept Ape" appears to show a relationship of bestiality between a writer and her ape, seen from the point of view of the 'ape'. No dialogue is spoken.
- "Two Fragments" gives a post-apocalyptic view of a ravaged London through the eyes of a father caring for his young daughter in a collapsed society.
- "Dead As They Come" tells of a wealthy businessman's bizarre obsession with a fashion mannequin, which he purchases and takes home with him.
- "In Between the Sheets" tells of a father's suspicions about his teenage daughter's relationship with her older midget girl-friend.
- "To and Fro" tells a story of two lovers laid alongside each other in bed. One of the lovers continuously switches 'to and fro' between the present moment and an office scene throughout the story.
- "Psychopolis" tells of a British traveller's growing sense of ennui as he travels across America, culminating in an unusual dinner party.

== Reception ==
Some critics acclaimed In Between the Sheets while others did not. In The Times, Caroline Moorehead asked in her headline, "Who Else But Ian McEwan Would Put a Lover in Ape's Clothing?" In The New York Review of Books, Robert Towers praised McEwan's "quiet, precise, sensual touch," calling him "a writer in full control of his materials" and describing his England as a "flat, rubble-strewn wasteland, populated by freaks and monsters, most of them articulate enough to tell their own stories with mesmerizing narrative power and an unfaltering instinct for the perfect, sickening detail." In the Washington Post, Terence March described McEwan's prose as "clear as a windowpane," and ranked the author as "a gifted storyteller and possibly the best British writer to appear in a decade or more." Hermione Lee of New Statesman referred to the stories as “seven elegantly gruesome accounts of derelict and perverted lives [that] cannot be dismissed after the first frisson: their peculiar images of pain and loss seem, retrospectively, to grow in depth.”

A year later, again in The New York Review of Books, writer and critic V.S. Pritchett gave a good sense of the stories' impact: "Ian McEwan has been recognized as an arresting new talent in the youngest generation of English short story writers. His subject matter is often squalid and sickening; his imagination has a painful preoccupation with the adolescent secrets of sexual aberration and fantasy. But in his accomplishment as a story writer he is an immediate master of styles and structures, his writing transfigures, and he can command variety in subject and feeling. His intellectual resources enable him—and the reader—to open windows in a claustrophobia which otherwise would have left us flinching and no more. Invention, irony, humor, a gift for satirical parody and curiosity give him the artist’s initiative. We do recognize an underworld—for that is what it is—and it is natural that he has evoked an, albeit distant, connection with Beckett and Kafka. His limitation is that his range of felt experience is confined to his love of his disgusts."

A reviewer for Kirkus Reviews criticized "Pornography" as predictable, but praised the title story, "Reflections of a Kept Ape", and "Dead as They Come", referring to the last of the three as "not the first story about a man in love with a mannequin, but surely both the funniest and ugliest". The reviewer wrote that "this slim collection is hardly McEwan at his best (he remains a writer of tremendous style who seems limited by his obsessions), but at the very least it reinforces his position as the Roald DaM for the sexually-eruptive 1970s.”

Julian Moynahan of The New York Times wrote an unfavorable review. Moynahan praised "To and Fro" as an "elegant stylistic exercise", but panned the title story, arguing "The see-saw relation between life and art that is implied goes back to Pater, Wilde, Mann, Yeats and a host of other writers active at the turn of the century. Nobody minds if a writer uses a stale and questionable idea, just so long as it combines with genuine feeling and insight. No such combining goes on here." Moynahan stated that "the stories are really not very good. They are mostly one-finger exercises containing a few passages of striking writing”. In The Times Literary Supplement, Caroline Blackwood argued that McEwan's "descriptions of desolate urban landscapes are very vivid. He can create a memorable atmosphere of menace. But he disgusts at a cost, for his determination to shock can make his dialogue absurdly tortured and the stories too contrived.”

David Malcolm, however, argued in 2002 that most of the stories are "rather detailed and painstaking evocations of mood and feeling" along with those in the author's earlier collection First Love, Last Rites (1975). Lucas Wittmann of The Daily Beast listed the collection in 2010 as one of McEwan's strongest early works along with his other short story collection, arguing, "In all of these stories lie the essence of McEwan’s fictional vision, and for any fan of his work this is the place to start to understand how he has evolved as a writer even while he’s never quite given up on finding humanity and dark humor in our collective foibles."

== Bibliography ==
- Malcolm, David (2002). Understanding Ian McEwan. Univ of South Carolina Press. ISBN 978-1-57003-436-7.
