= On Chesil Beach =

2007 novella by Ian McEwan

- Cover of UK hardback
- Author: Ian McEwan
- Cover artist: Chris Frazer Smith
- Genre: Fiction
- Publisher: Jonathan Cape
- Publication date: 2007
- Publication place: United Kingdom
- Media type: Print (hardback)
- Pages: 166
- ISBN: 0-224-08118-7
- OCLC: 76797966
- Dewey Decimal: 823.914

On Chesil Beach is a 2007 novella by the British writer Ian McEwan. It was selected for the 2007 Booker Prize shortlist.

The Washington Post and Pulitzer Prize-winning book critic Jonathan Yardley placed On Chesil Beach on his top ten list for 2007, praising McEwan's writing and saying that "even when he's in a minor mode, as he is here, he is nothing short of amazing".

== Plot summary ==
In July 1962, Edward Mayhew, a graduate student of history, and Florence Ponting, a violinist in a string quartet, are spending their honeymoon in a small hotel at Chesil Beach in Dorset. The two are very much in love despite being from drastically different backgrounds.

During the course of an evening, the couple reflect upon their upbringing and future prospects. Edward is sexually motivated and has a taste for rash behaviour. Florence is bound by the social code of another era and, perhaps having been sexually abused by her father, is terrified of sexual intimacy. She tries to prepare herself mentally for the inevitable consummation, but the thought continues to repel her.

Just as the couple are about to have sex for the first time the inexperienced Edward involuntarily ejaculates onto her belly and thighs. Revolted, Florence runs out of the hotel and onto the beach. Edward follows, and the couple argue, with Florence making it clear that she will never agree to have sex. Edward accuses her of lying during their marriage vows, and is further angered when Florence suggests that he could sleep with other women to relieve his sexual desires. The couple separate, and their marriage is annulled for lack of consummation.

A year after the annulment, ruminating on Florence's suggestion that he could sleep with other women, Edward realises that he no longer finds it to be insulting, though he remains unwilling to re-connect. Losing interest in writing history books, he becomes a shop manager. After his mother's death, he moves back to his childhood home to take care of his ailing father. Decades later, thinking back on his life, he recalls enjoying good relationships with his friends and family, and exploring other romances including a brief marriage with another woman, while acknowledging that he had never loved anyone as much as he loved Florence.

She, meanwhile, has been enjoying critical and commercial success with her string quartet. Edward does not attend any performance and avoids even reminders of it, unaware that Florence thinks of him after every performance. Edward chooses not to make contact, preferring to retain his early memories of her.

In his sixties, Edward recalls once again the night that he and Florence separated, wondering what could have been. He concludes that he and Florence would have enjoyed a loving and happy marriage, that Florence would have been beneficial to his career success, and that with love and patience he might have helped her to open up and enjoy sex. He muses that one's life can be changed by simply doing nothing: Florence had loved him deeply as she had walked away, and wanted nothing more than for him to call out so that she could turn back and reconcile. The novel ends with Edward remembering the sight of Florence walking away along the beach before disappearing from his sight.

== Pebbles ==
In a BBC Radio 4 interview, McEwan admitted to taking a few pebbles from Chesil Beach and keeping them on his desk while he wrote the novel. Protests by conservationists and a threat by Weymouth and Portland borough council to fine him £2,000 led the author to return the pebbles. "I was not aware of having committed a crime," he said. "Chesil Beach is beautiful and I'm delighted to return the shingle to it."

== Booker Prize nomination ==
After it was nominated for the Booker Prize in 2007, where its entry generated controversy over its length—at 166 pages and fewer than 40,000 words—even the author declared it to be a novella. In the end, the prize went to The Gathering.

== Film adaptation ==
On 17 February 2016, it was announced that Saoirse Ronan, who previously played Briony Tallis in the film adaptation of McEwan's Atonement, would star in On Chesil Beach. On 22 August 2016, Billy Howle was announced to play the role of Edward Mayhew. Dominic Cooke would be making his film directorial debut. The film was released in May 2018.
