= Atonement (novel) =

2001 novel by Ian McEwan

- Atonement cover
- Author: Ian McEwan
- Cover artist: Chris Frazer Smith
- Language: English
- Publisher: Jonathan Cape
- Publication date: 2001
- Publication place: United Kingdom
- Media type: Print (hardcover)
- Pages: 371 pp
- ISBN: 0-224-06252-2 (first edition)
- OCLC: 47231087

Atonement is a 2001 British novel written by Ian McEwan. Set in three time periods, 1935 England, Second World War England and France, and present-day England, it covers an upper-class girl's half-innocent mistake that ruins lives, her adulthood in the shadow of that mistake, and a reflection on the nature of writing.

Widely regarded as one of McEwan's best works, it was shortlisted for the 2001 Booker Prize for Fiction. In 2010, Time magazine named Atonement in its list of the 100 greatest English-language novels since 1923.

In 2007, the book was adapted into a BAFTA and Academy Award-winning film of the same title, starring Saoirse Ronan, James McAvoy, Keira Knightley and Vanessa Redgrave and directed by Joe Wright.

== Synopsis ==
=== Part one ===
Briony Tallis, a 13-year-old English girl with a talent for writing, lives at her family's country estate with her parents Jack and Emily Tallis. Her older sister Cecilia has recently graduated from the University of Cambridge with Robbie Turner, the Tallis family housekeeper's son and Cecilia's childhood friend, whose university education was funded by Jack Tallis.

In the summer of 1935, Briony's maternal cousins, 15-year-old Lola and 9-year-old twins Jackson and Pierrot, visit the family amidst their parents' divorce. Cecilia's older brother Leon returns from London, accompanied by his friend from Oxford, the well-off manufacturer Paul Marshall. Cecilia and Robbie bicker over a vase, which breaks and falls into a fountain. Cecilia strips to her underwear and dives in to retrieve the pieces, surprising Robbie. Briony, watching from a window, is confused and intrigued by Cecilia and Robbie's actions. She is inspired to begin writing psychological realism, and the reader is informed that this will eventually become a hallmark of her fiction.

After the incident by the pond, Robbie is attracted to Cecilia, and writes several drafts of a love letter to her. He gives the letter to Briony to deliver to Cecilia; however, he inadvertently gives her a version he had meant to discard, which contains lewd references ("In my dreams I kiss your cunt"). By the time Robbie realises his mistake, Briony has returned to the house with his letter.

Despite Robbie's instructions to the contrary, Briony opens the letter and reads it. She is shocked by its vulgar language, and becomes convinced that Robbie intends to harm Cecilia. An injured Lola goes to Briony for comfort, claiming that her younger brothers attacked her, although it is implied to have instead been Paul Marshall, who has a long scratch on his face. Briony relays the contents of the letter to Lola, who labels Robbie a "maniac", re-affirming Briony's feelings. Robbie arrives at the main house for a family dinner party, and is confronted by Cecilia. He confesses his feelings to her, and she responds in kind. Later the same evening, Briony walks in on Robbie and Cecilia having sex in the library. The immature Briony believes she interrupted a vicious assault on Cecilia, and stands stunned while Robbie and Cecilia quickly exit.

At the dinner, which is generally tense, it is discovered the twins have run away. The party breaks into teams to search for them. When Cecilia goes with Leon, Robbie and Briony each set off on their own. In the darkness, while everyone is searching for the twins, Briony discovers her cousin Lola being raped by an assailant neither girl can clearly see. The attacker flees. Briony, convinced that it must have been Robbie, gets Lola to agree that she likely heard Robbie's voice. The girls return home, and Briony identifies Robbie to the police as the rapist, claiming she saw his face in the dark. Lola is sedated by the local doctor, Cecilia screams at Briony and locks herself in her room, and Paul Marshall shares cigarettes with the policemen.

Robbie does not return, and the family and police officers stay awake waiting for him. As dawn breaks, Robbie appears in the driveway with Jackson and Pierrot, having found and rescued them. He is arrested on the spot and taken away, with only Cecilia and his mother believing his protestations of innocence. Briony is satisfied by this conclusion to her mythologised version of the events, with her as the hero and Robbie as the villain.

=== Part two ===
By the time the Second World War has started, Robbie has spent several years in prison. He and Cecilia have exchanged letters, maintaining their love for each other. Robbie is released from prison on the condition he enlist in the army. Meanwhile, Cecilia has completed training as a nurse, and cut off all contact with her family for the parts they played in locking Robbie up. Shortly before Robbie is deployed to France, they meet once for half an hour, during Cecilia's lunch break. Their reunion starts awkwardly, but they share a kiss before leaving each other.

The Battle of France is going badly and the army is retreating to Dunkirk. As the injured Robbie makes his way there, he thinks about his love for Cecilia and his hatred for Briony. He concludes that Briony was too young to be blamed fully, and writes Cecilia a letter encouraging her to reconnect with her family. His condition deteriorates over the course of the section; he weakens and becomes delirious. Robbie falls asleep in Dunkirk, one day before the evacuation begins.

=== Part three ===
A remorseful Briony, now eighteen years old, has refused her place at Cambridge and instead is a trainee nurse in London. She has realised the full extent of her mistake and decides it was Paul Marshall, Leon's friend, whom she saw with Lola.

Briony still writes fiction, and receives a letter from Cyril Connolly at the hospital where she works. Cyril is rejecting Briony's submitted draft of her latest work to his magazine, Horizon, but providing kindly and constructive feedback. The work is in fact the first draft of the first section of this novel.

Briony travels to attend the wedding of Paul Marshall and her cousin Lola, with the knowledge that Lola is marrying her rapist. Briony considers speaking up during the wedding, but does not. Afterwards, she visits Cecilia, who is cold but invites Briony in nonetheless. While Briony is apologizing to Cecilia, Robbie unexpectedly appears from the bedroom. He has been living with Cecilia while he is on leave from the army. Robbie expresses his fury at Briony, but with Cecilia's soothing remains civil.

Cecilia and Robbie both refuse to forgive Briony, who nonetheless tells them she will try to put things right. She promises to begin the legal procedures needed to exonerate Robbie, even though Paul Marshall will never be held responsible for his crime because of his marriage to Lola. As Briony leaves Cecilia's, she is optimistic about her role in Robbie's exoneration, thinking that it will be "a new draft, an atonement" and that she is ready to begin.

=== Postscript ===
The final section, titled "London 1999", is narrated by Briony herself in the first person. Now 77, she is a successful novelist who has recently been diagnosed with vascular dementia, so she is facing rapid mental decline.

It is confirmed that Briony is the author of the preceding three sections of the novel. She attends a party in her honour at the former Tallis family home (now a country-house hotel), where the extended Tallis children perform The Trials of Arabella, the play that 13-year-old Briony had written and unsuccessfully attempted to stage with her cousins in the summer of 1935. Leon and Pierrot are in attendance, Jackson is fifteen years deceased, and Lola is alive but does not attend. Finally, Briony reveals to the reader that Robbie Turner died of septicaemia on the beaches of Dunkirk, that Cecilia was killed several months later when a bomb destroyed Balham Underground station during the Blitz, and that Briony's story of seeing them together in 1940 was a fabrication. Briony did attend Lola's wedding to Paul Marshall, but confesses she was too "cowardly" to visit the recently bereaved Cecilia to make amends. The novel, which she says is factually true apart from Robbie and Cecilia being reunited, is her lifelong attempt at "atonement" for what she did to them.

Briony justifies her invented happy ending by saying she does not see what purpose it would serve to give readers a "pitiless" story. She writes, "I like to think that it isn't weakness or evasion, but a final act of kindness, a stand against oblivion and despair, to let my lovers live and to unite them at the end."

== Main characters ==
- Briony Tallis – The younger sister of Leon and Cecilia Tallis, Briony is an aspiring writer. She is a thirteen-year-old at the beginning of the novel and takes part in sending Robbie Turner to prison when she falsely claims that he assaulted Lola. Briony is part narrator, part character and we see her transformation from child to woman as the novel progresses. At the end of the novel, Briony has realised her wrongdoing as a child and decides to write the novel to find atonement.
- Cecilia Tallis – The middle child in the Tallis family, Cecilia has fallen in love with her childhood companion, Robbie Turner. After a tense encounter by the fountain, she and Robbie do not speak again until they meet before a formal dinner. When Robbie is accused of rape shortly after, Cecilia loses him to prison and war, and chooses not to contact any members of her family again.
- Leon Tallis – The eldest child in the Tallis family, Leon returns home to visit. He brings his friend Paul Marshall along with him on his trip home.
- Emily Tallis – Emily is the mother of Briony, Cecilia, and Leon. Emily is ill in bed for most of the novel, suffering from severe migraines.
- Jack Tallis – Jack is the father of Briony, Cecilia, and Leon. Jack often works late nights and it is alluded to in the novel that he is having an affair.
- Robbie Turner – Robbie is the son of Grace Turner, who lives on the grounds of the Tallis home. Having grown up with Leon, Briony and Cecilia, he knows the family well. He attended Cambridge University with Cecilia and when they come home after graduating, they fall in love. Robbie is sent to prison for three and a half years, after Briony falsely accuses him of raping Lola.
- Grace Turner – The mother of Robbie Turner, she was given permission from Jack Tallis to live on the grounds. She has become the family's charlady and does laundry for the Tallises. When her son is accused of raping Lola, only she and Cecilia believe he is innocent, and Grace chooses to leave the Tallis family.
- Lola Quincey – A 15-year-old girl who is Briony, Cecilia, and Leon's cousin. She comes, along with her twin brothers, to stay with the Tallises during her parents' divorce. Lola was supposed to assume the main role in Briony's play, until it was cancelled. She is also subject to rape while staying at the Tallis household. Lola appears later in the novel as a mature woman, married to Paul Marshall. She is red-headed and fair-skinned with freckles.
- Jackson and Pierrot Quincey – Lola's younger twin brothers and Briony, Cecilia, and Leon's cousins. They come, along with their sister, to stay with the Tallises during their parents' divorce. Briony wants the twins to take a role in her play, but disputes mean the play is cancelled, upsetting them both. Pierrot appears later in the novel as an old man while his brother has died.
- Danny Hardman – The handyman for the Tallis family. Robbie and Cecilia suspect he is responsible for Lola's rape until Briony tells them otherwise, prompting Robbie to say they owe him an apology.
- Paul Marshall – A friend of Leon. He rapes Lola outside the Tallis household after dark; Briony, however, accuses Robbie of Lola's rape, and many years later Lola and Paul marry. Paul Marshall also owns a chocolate factory that manufactures 'Amo' bars – chocolate bars which he negotiates to supply to army troops, which later earn him a considerable fortune.
- Corporal Nettle – Nettle is one of Robbie's two companions during the Dunkirk evacuation. In the fourth and final section of the novel, an elderly Briony alludes to an "old Mr. Nettle" from whom she received a "dozen long letters" but whether this is the same person is not made exactly clear.
- Corporal Mace – Mace is the second of Robbie's two companions during the Dunkirk evacuation. He is last seen presumably rescuing an RAF man from a possible lynching by some infantrymen under the guise of wanting to do harm by drowning him in the "bloody sea".
- Betty – The Tallis family's servant, described as "wretched" in personality.

== References to other literary works ==
Atonement contains intertextual references to a number of other literary works, including Gray's Anatomy, Virginia Woolf's The Waves, Thomas Hardy's Jude the Obscure, Henry James' The Golden Bowl, Jane Austen's Northanger Abbey, Samuel Richardson's Clarissa, Vladimir Nabokov's Lolita, Rosamond Lehmann's Dusty Answer, and Shakespeare's The Tempest, Macbeth, Hamlet, and Twelfth Night. McEwan has also said that he was directly influenced by L. P. Hartley's The Go-Between.

Atonement references two real-life literary critics: Cyril Connolly and Elizabeth Bowen.

== Reception ==
=== Awards and honours ===
==== Awards ====
- Shortlisted for the 2001 Booker Prize for Fiction
- Shortlisted for the 2001 James Tait Black Memorial Prize
- Shortlisted for the 2001 Whitbread Novel Award
- Won the 2002 Los Angeles Times Book Prize for fiction
- Won the 2002 National Book Critics Circle Award for Fiction
- Won the 2002 WH Smith Literary Award
- Won the 2002 Boeke Prize
- Won the 2004 Santiago Prize for the European Novel

==== Honours ====
- Ranked #82 on Entertainment Weekly's list of 100 best books (1983-2008)
- Named best fiction novel of the year by Time and included in its All-Time 100 Greatest Novels
- Listed in The Observer's 100 greatest novels
- Ranked #41 on The Guardian's list of 100 best books of the 21st century
- Included in The Daily Telegraph's "100 greatest novels of all time"
- Ranked #26 on The New York Times' "100 Best Books of the 21st Century"

=== Controversies ===
==== Accusations of plagiarism ====
In late 2006, the agent for the late romance and historical author Lucilla Andrews accused McEwan of failing to give Andrews sufficient credit for material on wartime nursing in London sourced from her 1977 autobiography No Time for Romance. McEwan, who had faced similar accusations before (see The Cement Garden § Controversy), professed innocence of plagiarism while acknowledging his debt to the author. McEwan had included Andrews among the acknowledgements in the book, and several authors defended him, including John Updike, Martin Amis, Margaret Atwood, Thomas Keneally, Zadie Smith, and the reclusive Thomas Pynchon.

== Publication ==
The novel was initially named An Atonement. Historian Tim Garton-Ash, to whom McEwan often shows his book drafts, persuaded McEwan to change the title at the last minute.

It was first published by then publishing director Dan Franklin, Jonathan Cape, London, the UK in 2001. The first American edition was published by Nan A. Talese/Doubleday in April 2002. The first audio book is by Recorded Books, 2002 and read by Jill Tanner.

=== Cover ===
The first-edition cover image, designed by Suzanne Dean, depicts a girl wearing a summer dress sitting on the stone steps of a bridge at Gaddesden Place, a country house in Hertfordshire. John Wilson of BBC4 describes it as having "a pensive quality, almost a weariness". This picture was taken only after the girl had been photographed for hours, getting frustrated and tapping her foot in boredom.

== Adaptations ==
A film adaptation, directed by Joe Wright from a screenplay by Christopher Hampton, was released by Working Title Films in September 2007 in the United Kingdom and in December 2007 in the United States. The film, starring James McAvoy and Keira Knightley, was a commercial and critical success, and won an Oscar for Best Original Score.

In 2023, the novel was adapted for ballet by Cathy Marston, with a score composed by Laura Rossi, sets designed by Michael Levine, and costumes by Bregje Van Balen. The ballet had its world premiere at Ballett Zürich on 28 April, before its U.S. premiere in October by the Joffrey Ballet at the Lyric Opera of Chicago. The adaptation was lauded by critics as "Marston's finest ballet to date". When McEwan saw the world premiere of the ballet in April of 2023, he noted that the performance allowed himself to "fully experience the emotion" of his novel for the first time and found it to be "very very powerful, emotionally, to see bodies speaking the narrative".

It was announced in February 2026 that Christopher Hampton was adapting the novel into a stage play, to premiere at Chichester Festival Theatre in May of that year. Miriam Petche as Cecilia and Jasper Talbot as Robbie, with Isabella Dempster as the young Briony, act in the production.
