= Lara Jones =

British artist, children's author and illustrator (1975–2010)

- Born: 1975; Ashby-de-la-Zouch, England
- Died: 26 March 2010 (aged 34–35)
- Education: Canterbury College of Art; Cheltenham College
- Occupations: Artist, children's author and illustrator
- Spouse: Shaun Clarke (m. 2003)
- Children: 2
- Parent(s): Mal Lewis Jones and Ivan Jones

Lara Kate Jones (1975 – 26 March 2010) was a British artist, children's author and illustrator. She is best remembered for her Poppy Cat series of children's books, which have been published in 20 languages and sold more than two and a half million copies.

In 2012, a major award was set up in her name by Macmillan Children's books, called The Lara Jones Illustration Award, with a prize of £500 for the best illustration for a children's book by a new illustrator. So far there have been four winners.

== Early life ==
Lara Kate Jones was born in Ashby-de-la-Zouch, Leicestershire, England, and spent her childhood in Shropshire. Both of her parents were writers. Her father was Ivan Jones the best-selling fiction writer and poet, and her mother Mal Lewis Jones was also a children's writer. Lara was the first born of their three children, her siblings being Levin, a professional violinist, and Jessica, an artist, poet and singer songwriter.

Lara studied art at Canterbury College of Art and then at Cheltenham College, going on to work at the Royal Academy and the Inkshed artists' agency before becoming a full-time writer and illustrator.

== As a writer ==
She published many books, but is best remembered for her Poppy Cat series, which are published by Macmillan/Campbell Books. These books, for the very young, have sold in 20 languages and nearly two million copies. They are published in Brazil, Spain, France, Italy, Mexico, Finland, Denmark, Ireland, the Netherlands and Japan, as well as other countries. To date, there have been two major television animated series of 52 episodes each and were produced by Nick Jr. and BAFTA award-winning King Rollo Films. The 104 episodes are shown all over the world including America and Great Britain.

Jones was awarded the 2004 Sheffield Baby Book prize (bronze) and then a Booktrust Early Years Award for Poppy Cat's Farm in 2005.

Poppy Cat Hug won the Bronze Award at the Right Start Best Toy Award 2006.

Swap the Scene Poppy Cat was a Bronze Award winner of the Practical Parenting Award 2006.

Good Night, Poppy Cat was acclaimed as one of the best 10 books for the under-fives in The Independent, by Boyd Tonkin.

The recently published Poppy Cat's First Word Book has been highly praised by pre-school magazine for containing more than 50 words that toddlers can learn.

Jones illustrated numerous other books, including her own picture books, I Love Hugs and I Love My Potty. Other books illustrated by Jones include Mermaid Poems (Clare Bevan), Mermaid Stories, Fairy Poems and Fairy Stories (all published by MacMillan), as well as Babies Can by Ian Whybrow and Pip and the Edge of Heaven by Elizabeth Liddle (Lion, 2002). Her final book was I Want a Mini Tiger, written by Joyce Dunbar and published by Macmillan Books. Jones also had other projects in the pipeline, notably a book with Orchard Books, for which she had done initial drawings.

== Personal life ==
While at college, Jones met fellow artist Shaun Clarke, whom she married in 2003; they had two children. On 26 March 2010, she died at the age of 34 from melanoma.
