= Theakston =

Theakston may refer to:

- Theakston, North Yorkshire
- Theakston Brewery, a British brewery

== People ==
- Greg Theakston (b. 1953), American comics artist and illustrator
- Jamie Theakston (b. 1971), English television and radio presenter
- Joseph Theakston (1772-1842) English sculptor
- Paul Theakston, founder of the Black Sheep Brewery
- Will Theakston (b. 1984), English actor
