= Mal Lewis Jones =

British children's author

Mal Lewis Jones is a British children's author.

== Background ==
Mal Lewis Jones was born in Kidderminster, England, and attended Kidderminster High School for Girls. She continued her education at Warwick University, where she read English and American Literature. Her tutors were Germaine Greer, Harold Beaver, and Bernard Bergonzi.

Lewis Jones' main titles concern Cassie at the Ballet School. The books are published by Hodder Children's Books and by Ravensburger in Germany. There have been many "collections" of the stories where two stories are contained in one edition. The covers of the original books show Sophie Bould and Mal's youngest daughter, Jess. Sophie Bould starred alongside Connie Fisher in The Sound of Music.

Lewis Jones has published other dance books including the six titles in the Dance Club series, published by McDonald Young books.

She has also adapted The Wind in the Willows by Kenneth Grahame for Hodder and WHSmith.

Her strange and mysterious story The Grey Pony is published by Orion. Mal Lewis Jones is also well known for the series of educational books published by Heinemann. These have been very successful and widely used in UK schools and elsewhere.

She is also joint co-collator of the classic poetry anthology Good Night, Sleep Tight (2000), which is a collection of 366 poems, one for every night of the year. It is published by Scholastic and in America by Scholastic Inc.

She lives in Shropshire with her husband, Ivan Jones. Their eldest daughter was the illustrator of Poppy Cat, Lara Jones, who died aged 34, in 2010.

== Titles of books ==
- Cassie at the Ballet School
- Ghost at the Ballet School
- New Friends at the Ballet School
- Trouble at the Ballet School
- On Tour with the Ballet School
- Stars of the Ballet School

Lewis Jones has also written and published many poems in anthologies.
