= Ivan Jones (author) =

British writer of fiction

Ivan Jones is a British writer of fiction. His work includes novels, picture books, plays, poetry anthologies, television series and many adaptations for BBC Radio. He was born in Shropshire and educated at Adams Grammar School in Newport and has a first degree from Birmingham University and a master's degree from the University of Nottingham.

== Novels and picture books ==
Jones' best known novels are The Ghost Hunter series, published by Scholastic and Kindle. The books were adapted into three six-part series for BBC Television. The first series was broadcast in 2000, second series in 2001 and the third series in 2002. They are still being shown in the UK and in other parts of the world. One of the main characters in the series was Mrs Croker, played by Jean Marsh (who also acted in Upstairs Downstairs). Will Theakston played Roddy Oliver. The ghost boy, William Povey, was played by Lee Godwin and Roddy's sister was played by Verity-Jane Dearsley.

The Ghost Hunter and The Ghost Hunter at Chillwood Castle have also been published as an audiobook and in large print. The Ghost Hunter is also published in Japanese. The Ghost Hunter's House of Horror was the third book published by Scholastic.

His picture books, including The Golden Cage (Andersen Press), and The Lazy Giant (Oxford University Press, illustrated by Dee Shulman) and in the USA (Dingles & Co) are written in a classic fairy-tale style and contain a moral. The Golden Cage is illustrated by Ken Brown and is also published in France (by Gallimard) and in Sweden.

His best-selling stories about Zot the Dog, published by Puffin Books, are humorous and zany. The first title, Adventures of Zot the Dog, was first noticed by Elizabeth Attenborough when the manuscript arrived at Penguin Books. The book originally published in hardback, was chosen as one of the best books of the year by Julia Eccleshare.

Other titles followed: Zot's Treasures, Zot Solves It and Zot Goes Camping. The books are illustrated by Judy Brown. The stories were adapted into a 13-part animated cartoon series for ITV and subsequently released on video. The books were dramatised for Cannon Hill Puppet Theatre and the production ran for 88 performances in Birmingham, as well as touring schools nationally. Jones has published other books, notably The Battle for Muck Farm, (Hodder and Stoughton, illustrated by Georgie Birkett,) which is a magical fantasy about a girl called Kitty and her strange and mysterious horse friend, Humpy Lumpy.

== Plays ==
Early in his career, Jones wrote a weekly comedy for BBC Radio called Lost Hollow. Lost Hollow is the name of the village round which the series was based; a village cut off from the outside world and full of eccentric characters such as Reginald Pustule Quatt, Gilbert Sludge and Madame Cochon. Parts of the drama are satirical, while other parts are gently humorous – exaggerating rivalries and characters of village life. The series ran for 60 episodes and was produced and directed by Diane Kemp.

Ivan Jones' play Shelter was one of the winning entries for the Midlands New Writers Festival. This is a moving, sometimes tragic, play with powerful themes of homelessness and fantasy. It contains strong characters and explores such themes as young love, anger, religion and escapism. The central character's obsession with James Bond is both a parody of Fleming's character but also an exploration of the power of such a character on the workings and imaginings of a young person's mind.

Jones' stage play Winterblock's Ghost was performed at Leicester Haymarket, with the lead role played by Colin Hurley. This is a play in the absurdist tradition. It uses black humour and grotesque characters. All the action takes place in the offices of an educational bureaucracy where absurd struggles for power take place – and where a ghost seeks revenge.

== Poems ==
As well as his other writing, Ivan Jones has published many poems for adults and children, including the very successful Good Night, Sleep Tight, which is published by Scholastic and Scholastic Inc (USA). The book contains a poem for every night of the year (365 in all) and each month is illustrated by a different, well-known artist.

Many of Jones' poems were commissioned for BBC schools' radio, including several about Kochi in India, viz: The Chinese Fishermen at Kochi; Water City; Monsoon Storm. Some of these poems were read for radio by Michael Rosen. Other commissioned works included poems The Magpie, Birds Arrive and many about "the sea". Numerous other poems appear in collections such as I Love You, Football; and I Wanna Be Your Mate, (edited by Tony Bradman ) and Spooky Poems, (published by Scholastic). More recently poems have appeared in collections edited by Gaby Morgan (Macmillan).

One of Jones's controversial poems, "Ironbridge" is featured in several collections including "Between the Severn and the Wye" edited by Johnny Coppin.

== Adaptations ==
He has adapted many children's books for Radio 4 and Radio 7 including:

- The Machine Gunners by Robert Westall
- Al Capone Does My Shirts by Gennifer Choldenko
- The Pig Scrolls by Paul Shipton
- Wolf Brother by Michelle Paver
- The Fantastical Adventures of the Invisible Boy by Lloyd Alexander
- Chinese Cinderella by Adeline Yen Mah
- The Girl with the Broken Wing by Heather Dyer
- The Daydreamer by Ian McEwan.
- Stunt Girl by Jonny Zucker.
- The War Diaries of Alistair Fury by Jamie Rix
- Avril Crump by Angela Woolfe.
- Smile by Geraldine McCaughrean
- Notes from a Liar and her Dog by Gennifer Choldenko
- Vinegar Street by Philip Ridley

== Personal life ==
Ivan Jones is married to the author, Mal Lewis Jones. His eldest daughter was Lara Jones, the illustrator and writer of the multimillion selling Poppy Cat books. Lara died in March 2010 from melanoma. Poppy Cat is currently a television series in the UK and America.
