= Parsley Sidings =

- Country of origin: United Kingdom
- Home station: BBC Radio 2
- Syndicates: BBC Radio 7; BBC Radio 4 Extra
- Starring: Arthur Lowe; Ian Lavender; Kenneth Connor
- Created by: Jim Eldridge
- No. of series: 2
- No. of episodes: 21

Parsley Sidings is a BBC Radio sitcom of the early 1970s created by Jim Eldridge. It stars Arthur Lowe and Ian Lavender (who were starring in the sitcom Dad's Army at the time) and Kenneth Connor from the Carry On films.

The show is set in a sleepy out of the way railway station on the main line between London and Birmingham, in the Midlands. The main characters are the station master, Mr Horace Hepplewhite (played by Arthur Lowe); his son, Bertrand (Ian Lavender); station porter Percy Valentine (Kenneth Connor); Mr Bradshaw, the signalman (also played by Kenneth Connor, as was Clara the station hen); and station tannoy announcer Gloria Simpkins (Liz Fraser, who was also in the Carry On films, and appeared in the Dad's Army feature film). The guest cast in some episodes included Bill Pertwee (also from Dad's Army, appearing in episode 11), Roger Delgado (The Master in Doctor Who during the Jon Pertwee era) with the announcer for the programme being Keith Skues.

The scripts are by Jim Eldridge (who would later go on to write for many more series, the most successful being the BBC's King Street Junior). The series was produced by Edward Taylor, and was broadcast on BBC Radio 2. Due to the BBC's then practice of wiping tapes after the broadcast of a show, only a minority of the 21 episodes produced were still in the BBC archive; Goodbye, Parsley Sidings and The Entente Cordial are aired on BBC Radio 4 Extra occasionally and have always been in the BBC archives, while A Night Out, A Bird in the Hand and The Secret Agent were recovered between 2001 and 2003 as off-air recordings from members of the public. These episodes were aired in early 2007. All the other episodes are known to exist in private hands.

In 2008, more episodes were 'discovered', including the pilot and "The New Level Crossing".

The BBC broadcast some programmes from the series in February 2011. Starting 1 November 2012, 4 Extra began a run of the whole series using audio compiled from both the BBC's own archive and private collections, with intros and outros re-recorded by original on-stage announcer Keith Skues.

The signature tune is "Banjo Boy" by Roger Roger, from the LP Mood Music Vol. 18 in the Chappell music library. (This music was also used for the signature tune of the 1969–71 British TV series The Mind of Mr. J.G. Reeder.)

== Episodes ==
Series 1
| Title | Recorded | First broadcast |
| Pilot | Unknown | 28–02–1971 |
| The Market Special | 01–12–1971 | 05–12–1971 |
| The Postal Express | 02–12–1971 | 12–12–1971 |
| The Beauty Queen Contest | 02–12–1971 | 19–12–1971 |
| The Inspector Calls | 03–12–1971 | 31–12–1971 |
| The 1890 Rocket | 03–12–1971 | 02–01–1972 |
| The Excursion | 07–12–1971 | 09–01–1972 |
| Cricket, Lovely Cricket | 12–12–1971 | 16–01–1972 |
| Who'll Be Mother? | 14–12–1971 | 23–01–1972 |
| The Concert | Unknown | 30–01–1972 |
| Goodbye, Parsley Sidings | 09–01–1972 | 06–02–1972 |
Series 2
| Title | Recorded | First broadcast |
| Pass The Parcel | 25–10–1972 | 29–09–1973 |
| The Flower Show | Unknown | 06–10–1973 |
| The Entente Cordiale | 15–11–1972 | 13–10–1973 |
| A Night Out | 23–10–1972 | 20–10–1973 |
| The Goods Train | Unknown | 27–10–1973 |
| A Bird in the Hand | 08–11–1972 | 03–11–1973 |
| The Purity League | 13–11–1972 | 10–11–1973 |
| The New Level Crossing | 27–10–1972 | 17–11–1973 |
| The Film Makers | 06–11–1972 | 24–11–1973 |
| The Secret Agent | 01–11–1972 | 01–12–1973 |
