= King Street Junior Revisited =

- Genre: Radio comedy
- Running time: 30 minutes
- Country of origin: United Kingdom
- Language: English
- Home station: BBC Radio 4
- Starring: Carolyn Pickles; Marlene Sidaway
- Created by: Jim Eldridge
- Written by: Jim Eldridge
- Produced by: John Fawcett Wilson
- Original release: 26 April 2002 – 6 May 2005
- No. of series: 4
- No. of episodes: 24
- Website: King Street Junior Revisited at BBC Radio 4 Extra

King Street Junior Revisited is a continuation of the earlier BBC radio comedy King Street Junior. The show debuted in 2002 on BBC Radio 4 and ran for four series until 2005. It starred Carolyn Pickles and Marlene Sidaway.

Of the cast from the original show, Sidaway and Paul Copley (as Mr. Long) reprise their roles, as well as Beatty who joined the cast from the penultimate series onwards.

== Cast ==
- Carolyn Pickles as Mrs. June Devon
- Marlene Sidaway as Miss. Glenda Lewis
- Michael Cochrane as Mr. David Maxwell
- Paul Copley as Mr. Geoff Long
- Teresa Gallagher as Miss. Daphne Featherstone
- Jacqueline Beatty as Miss. Ginny Reid
- Janice Acquah as Mrs. Khan

== Episodes ==
=== Series 1 ===
No. overall	No. in series	Title	Original release date
1	1	"A Good Heart"	26 April 2002
2	2	"The Real Thing"	3 May 2002
3	3	"The System"	10 May 2002
4	4	"Oh No It Isn't"	17 May 2002
5	5	"Waiting for Ofsted"	24 May 2002
6	6	"Jour de Fête"	31 May 2002

=== Series 2 ===
No. overall	No. in series	Title	Original release date
7	1	"Going Through the Roof"	27 June 2003
8	2	"The Spirit of Christmas"	4 July 2003
9	3	"Time"	11 July 2003
10	4	"Love All"	18 July 2003
11	5	"Priorities"	25 July 2003
12	6	"Play On"	1 August 2003

=== Series 3 ===
No. overall	No. in series	Title	Original release date
13	1	"Half Term Blues"	23 July 2004
14	2	"Ice"	30 July 2004
15	3	"Filling In"	6 August 2004
16	4	"Rumours"	13 August 2004
17	5	"Flaming June"	20 August 2004
18	6	"This Is Your Life"	27 August 2004

=== Series 4 ===
No. overall	No. in series	Title	Original release date
19	1	"Another Year, Another Head"	1 April 2005
20	2	"In the News"	8 April 2005
21	3	"It's Behind You"	15 April 2005
22	4	"To the Barricades"	22 April 2005
23	5	"Turning the Tables"	29 April 2005
24	6	"Centenary"	6 May 2005

== Broadcast history ==
The show was originally broadcast on BBC Radio 4. Repeats of the show later aired on BBC Radio 7 and BBC Radio 4 Extra.

== Multimedia ==
The four series of the show are published by Penguin and available to purchase at Audible.
