= 23rd Young Artist Awards =

2002 US media awards ceremony

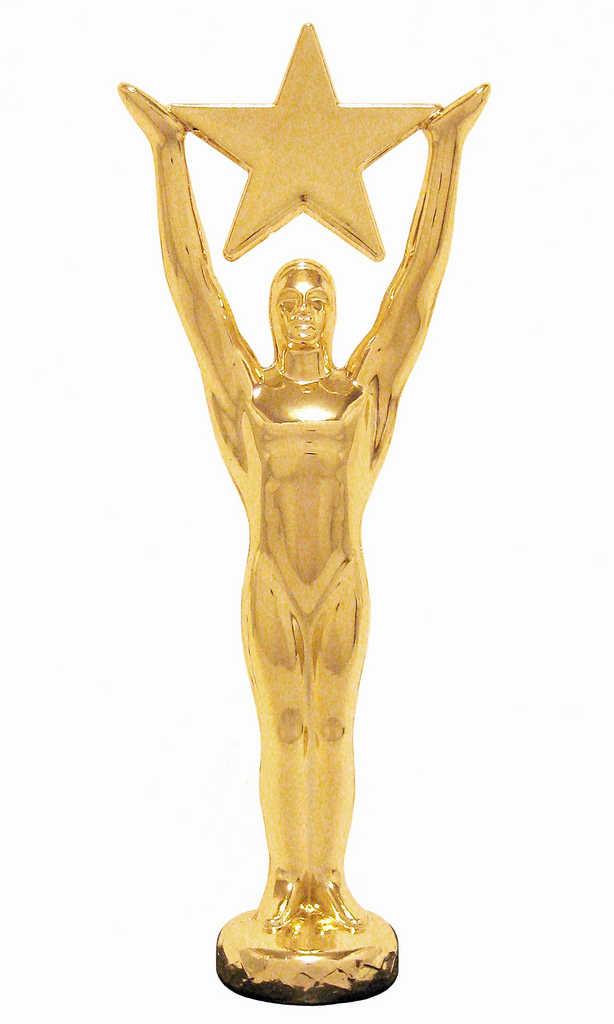
- Awarded for: Achievement in 2001 in film and television
- Date: April 7, 2002
- Site: Sportsmen's Lodge; Studio City, California
- Hosted by: Cole Caplan and Kristen Bone

The 23rd Young Artist Awards ceremony, presented by the Young Artist Association, honored excellence of young performers under the age of 21 in the fields of film, television, theater and music for the year 2001, and took place on April 7, 2002 at the Sportsmen's Lodge in Studio City, California.

Established in 1978 by long-standing Hollywood Foreign Press Association member, Maureen Dragone, the Young Artist Association was the first organization to establish an awards ceremony specifically set to recognize and award the contributions of performers under the age of 21 in the fields of film, television, theater and music.

== Categories ==
★ Bold indicates the winner in each category.

== Best Performance in a Feature Film ==
=== Best Performance in a Feature Film: Leading Young Actor ===
★ Anton Yelchin - Hearts in Atlantis - Warner Bros.

- Blake Foster - Kids World - Blue Steel Releasing
- Trevor Morgan - The Glass House - Columbia Pictures
- Camden Munson - In the Bedroom - Miramax
- Haley Joel Osment - A.I. Artificial Intelligence - DreamWorks
- Alexander Pollock - Cats & Dogs - Warner Bros.
- Jake Gyllenhaal - Donnie Darko - Pandora Cinema

=== Best Performance in a Feature Film: Leading Young Actress ===
★ (tie) Scarlett Johansson - An American Rhapsody - Paramount Classics
★ (tie) Emma Watson - Harry Potter and the Sorcerer's Stone - Warner Bros.

- Hayden Panettiere - Joe Somebody - 20th Century Fox
- Evan Rachel Wood - Little Secrets - TriStar Pictures

=== Best Performance in a Feature Film: Supporting Young Actor ===
★ Jake Thomas - A.I. Artificial Intelligence - DreamWorks

- Justin Berfield - Max Keeble's Big Move - Walt Disney
- Freddie Boath - The Mummy Returns - Universal
- Serge Cockburn - Crocodile Dundee in Los Angeles - Universal
- Tom Felton - Harry Potter and the Sorcerer's Stone - Warner Bros.
- Matthew O'Leary - Domestic Disturbance - Paramount
- Will Rothhaar - Hearts in Atlantis - Warner Bros.

=== Best Performance in a Feature Film: Supporting Young Actress ===
★ Brooke Anne Smith - Max Keeble's Big Move - Walt Disney

- Mika Boorem - Hearts in Atlantis - Warner Bros.
- Irene Gorovaia - The Royal Tenenbaums - Touchstone
- Alakina Mann - The Others - Miramax
- Alexa Vega - Spy Kids - Miramax
- Mae Whitman - An American Rhapsody - Paramount Classics

=== Best Performance in a Feature Film: Young Actor Age Ten or Under ===
★ James Bentley - The Others - Miramax

- Anthony Borrows - Liam - Lions Gate Films
- Angus T. Jones - See Spot Run - Warner Bros.
- Jonah Meyerson - The Royal Tenenbaums - Touchstone
- Grant Rosenmeyer - The Royal Tenenbaums - Touchstone

=== Best Performance in a Feature Film: Young Actress Age Ten or Under ===
★ Dakota Fanning - I Am Sam - New Line Cinema

- Kelly Endresz-Banlaki - An American Rhapsody - Paramount Classics
- Skye McCole Bartusiak - Riding in Cars with Boys - Sony Pictures
- Steffani Brass - Dawg - Gold Circle Films
- Brittany Tiplady - The Pledge - Warner Bros.

== Best Performance in a TV Movie ==
=== Best Performance in a TV Movie (Comedy or Drama): Leading Young Actor ===
★ Ryan Merriman - Dangerous Child - Lifetime

- Nicholas Braun - Walter and Henry - Showtime
- Rory Culkin - Off Season - Showtime
- Bobby Edner - The Day the World Ended - HBO
- Alex D. Linz - The Jennie Project - Disney Channel
- Trevor O'Brien - Motocrossed - Disney Channel
- Josh Zuckerman - 'Twas the Night - Disney Channel

=== Best Performance in a TV Movie (Comedy or Drama): Leading Young Actress ===
★ Kelsey Keel - My Louisiana Sky - Showtime

- Kimberly J. Brown - Halloweentown II: Kalabar's Revenge - Disney Channel
- Kerry Duff - Jett Jackson: The Movie - Disney Channel
- Chloe Rose Lattanzi - My Louisiana Sky - Showtime
- Ashley Rose Orr - Child Star: The Shirley Temple Story - ABC
- Alison Pill - What Girls Learn - Showtime
- Shadia Simmons - Zenon: The Zequel - Disney Channel

=== Best Performance in a TV Movie (Comedy or Drama): Supporting Young Actor ===
★ Robert Clark - Prancer Returns - USA

- J. Adam Brown - My Horrible Year! - Showtime
- Michael Cera - My Louisiana Sky - Showtime
- Marc Donato - Dangerous Child - Lifetime
- Kyle Kassardjian - They Call Me Sirr - Showtime
- Max Morrow - Sister Mary Explains It All - Showtime
- Scott Terra - Motocrossed - Disney Channel
- Joey Zimmerman - Halloweentown II: Kalabar's Revenge - Disney Channel

=== Best Performance in a TV Movie (Comedy or Drama): Supporting Young Actress ===
★ Brenda Grate - 'Twas the Night - Disney Channel

- Hallee Hirsh - Taking Back Our Town - Lifetime
- Tamara Hope - What Girls Learn - Showtime

=== Best Performance in a TV Movie (Comedy or Drama): Young Actor Age 10 or Under ===
★ Gavin Fink - Prancer Returns - USA

- Andrew Van Hise - Two For One - PAX
- Adam Schurman - The Sons of Mistletoe - CBS

=== Best Performance in a TV Movie (Comedy or Drama): Young Actress Age 10 or Under ===
★ Hayley Lochner - Prancer Returns - USA

- Ashley Edner - Rain - United General
- Brittany Tiplady - The Sports Pages - Showtime

== Best Performance in a TV Drama Series ==
=== Best Performance in a TV Drama Series: Leading Young Actor ===
★ Eric Ian Goldberg - The Education of Max Bickford - CBS

- David Gallagher - 7th Heaven - WB
- Tyler Hynes - Tales from the Neverending Story - Hallmark Channel
- Robert Iler - The Sopranos - HBO
- Alex Wrathell - Pit Pony - CBS / Cochran Entertainment

=== Best Performance in a TV Drama Series: Leading Young Actress ===
★ Kirsten Storms - Days of Our Lives - NBC

- Ashley Lyn Cafagna - The Bold and the Beautiful - CBS
- Lindsay Felton - Caitlin's Way - Nickelodeon
- Elliot Page - Pit Pony - CBS / Cochran Entertainment
- Brittany Snow - Guiding Light - CBS

=== Best Performance in a TV Drama Series: Supporting Young Actor ===
★ Jesse McCartney - All My Children - ABC

- Jared Daperis - Ponderosa - PAX
- Scotty Leavenworth - Philly - ABC

=== Best Performance in a TV Drama Series: Supporting Young Actress ===
★ Keiko Agena - Gilmore Girls - WB

- Alexis Bledel - Gilmore Girls - WB
- Chea Courtney - Passions - NBC
- Mackenzie Rosman - 7th Heaven - WB
- Karle Warren - Judging Amy - CBS

=== Best Performance in a TV Drama Series: Guest Starring Young Actor ===
★ J.B. Gaynor - Touched by an Angel - CBS

- Marc Donato - Twice in a Lifetime - PAX
- Bobby Edner - Charmed - WB
- Marc John Jefferies - The Practice - ABC
- Erik Knudsen - The Guardian - CBS
- Jesse Plemons - The Guardian - CBS
- Shawn Pyfrom - The Division - Lifetime
- Corey Sevier - Twice in a Lifetime - PAX

=== Best Performance in a TV Drama Series: Guest Starring Young Actress ===
★ Jamie Renée Smith - ER - NBC

- Daveigh Chase - Touched by an Angel - CBS
- Jamie Lauren - The Practice - ABC
- Ashley Edner - 7th Heaven - WB
- Hallee Hirsh - ER - NBC
- Cassie Steele - Relic Hunter - Paramount

== Best Performance in a TV Comedy Series ==
=== Best Performance in a TV Comedy Series: Leading Young Actor ===
★ Frankie Muniz - Malcolm in the Middle - FOX

- Ryan Cooley - Degrassi: The Next Generation - CTV / Epitome Pictures
- Jake Goldsbie - Degrassi: The Next Generation - CTV / Epitome Pictures
- Shia LaBeouf - Even Stevens - Disney Channel
- Jonathan Malen - Screech Owls - Youth Television
- A.J. Trauth - Even Stevens - Disney Channel

=== Best Performance in a TV Comedy Series: Leading Young Actress ===
★ Christy Carlson Romano - Even Stevens - Disney Channel

- Hilary Duff - Lizzie McGuire - Disney Channel
- Brie Larson - Raising Dad - WB
- Alia Shawkat - State of Grace - ABC
- Michelle Trachtenberg - Truth or Scare - Discovery Kids Channel
- Mae Whitman - State of Grace - ABC

=== Best Performance in a TV Comedy Series: Supporting Young Actor ===
★ Timmy Fitzpatrick - Grounded for Life - FOX

- Matt Adams - Big Kids - Noggin
- Mitch Holleman - Reba - WB
- Steven Anthony Lawrence - Even Stevens - Disney Channel
- Tyler Posey - Doc - PAX
- Craig Lamar Traylor - Malcolm in the Middle - FOX

=== Best Performance in a TV Comedy Series: Supporting Young Actress ===
★ Lauren Frost - Even Stevens - Disney Channel

- Lalaine - Lizzie McGuire - Disney Channel
- Scarlett Pomers - Reba - WB
- Kelly Salmon - Big Kids - Noggin
- Madylin Sweeten - Everybody Loves Raymond - CBS

=== Best Performance in a TV Comedy Series: Guest Starring Young Actor ===
★ Shawn Pyfrom - Reba - WB

- Bobby Brewer - Malcolm in the Middle - FOX
- Eddie Karr - Grounded for Life - FOX
- Miles Marsico - Trading Places - BBC America
- Kevin Schmidt - Grounded for Life - FOX
- Jacob Smith - Becker - CBS

=== Best Performance in a TV Comedy Series: Guest Starring Young Actress ===
★ Brooke Anne Smith - Malcolm in the Middle - FOX

- Jenna Morrison - The Amanda Show - Nickelodeon
- Michelle Trachtenberg - Madtv - FOX

== Best Performance in a TV Comedy or Drama Series ==
=== Best Performance in a TV Series (Comedy or Drama): Young Actor Age 10 or Under ===
★ Austin Majors - NYPD Blue - ABC

- Myles Jeffrey - ER - NBC
- Demetrius Joyette - Doc - PAX
- Logan O'Brien - General Hospital - ABC
- Sullivan Sweetin - Everybody Loves Raymond - CBS
- Kendall Schmidt - Gilmore Girls - WB
- Erik Per Sullivan - Malcolm in the Middle - FOX
- Hayden Tank - Six Feet Under - HBO

=== Best Performance in a TV Series (Comedy or Drama): Young Actress Age 10 or Under ===
★ Ashley Edner - The Huntress - USA

- Taylor Atelian - According to Jim - ABC
- Skye McCole Bartusiak - Touched by an Angel - CBS
- Billi Bruno - According to Jim - ABC
- Parker McKenna Posey - My Wife and Kids - ABC
- Brittany Tiplady - Night Visions - FOX

== Best Ensemble Performance ==
=== Best Ensemble in a TV Series (Comedy or Drama) ===
★ Degrassi: The Next Generation - CTV/Epitome Pictures

Sarah Barrable-Tishauer, Shane Kippel, Lauren Collins, Miriam McDonald, Melissa McIntyre, Ryan Cooley, Christina Schmidt, Jake Goldsbie, Cassie Steele, Aubrey Graham, Daniel Clark

- The Brothers García - Nickelodeon

Alvin Alvarez, Bobby Gonzales, Jeffrey Licon, Vaneza Leza Pitynski

- Lizzie McGuire - Disney Channel

Hilary Duff, Lalaine, Adam Lamberg, Jake Thomas, Ashlie Brillault

- Malcolm in the Middle - FOX

Frankie Muniz, Justin Berfield, Erik Per Sullivan, Craig Lamar Traylor

=== Best Ensemble in a Feature Film ===
★ An American Rhapsody - Paramount Classics

Scarlett Johansson, Mae Whitman, Kelly Endresz-Banlaki

- Harry Potter and the Sorcerer's Stone - Warner Bros.

Rupert Grint, Emma Watson, Tom Felton

- The Shipping News - Miramax

Alyssa Gainer, Kaitlyn Gainer, Lauren Gainer, Kyle Timothy Smith, Andrew Fowler, Will McAllister

== Best Family Entertainment ==
=== Best Family Movie or Special (Network or Cable) ===
★ Prancer Returns - USA

- Life with Judy Garland: Me and My Shadows - ABC
- Motocrossed - Disney Channel
- My Louisiana Sky - Showtime
- Child Star: The Shirley Temple Story - ABC
- They Call Me Sirr - Showtime
- 'Twas the Night - Disney Channel

=== Best Family TV Drama Series ===
★ The Education of Max Bickford - CBS

- Any Day Now - Lifetime
- Boston Public - FOX
- Pit Pony - CBS/Cochran Entertainment
- 7th Heaven - WB
- Touched by an Angel - CBS

=== Best Family TV Comedy Series ===
★ Malcolm in the Middle - FOX

- Degrassi: The Next Generation - CTV/Epitome Pictures
- Grounded for Life - FOX
- Reba - WB
- The Simpsons - FOX

=== Best Family Feature Film - Drama ===
★ I Am Sam - New Line Cinema

- An American Rhapsody - Paramount Classics
- Harry Potter and the Sorcerer's Stone - Warner Bros.
- Hearts in Atlantis - Warner Bros.
- The Lord of the Rings: The Fellowship of the Ring - New Line Cinema
- The Others - Miramax

=== Best Family Feature Film - Comedy ===
★ The Princess Diaries - Walt Disney

- Cats & Dogs - Warner Bros.
- Ghost World - MGM
- Kids World - Blue Steel Releasing
- Legally Blonde - MGM
- Serendipity - Miramax
- Spy Kids - Miramax

=== Best Family Feature Film - Animation ===
★ Shrek - DreamWorks

- Atlantis: The Lost Empire - Walt Disney
- Jimmy Neutron: Boy Genius - Nickelodeon
- Monsters, Inc. - Walt Disney
- Blue's Big Musical Movie - Nickelodeon

== Special awards ==
=== Best Young Actor in an International Film ===
★ Fernando Tielve - The Devil's Backbone (El Espinazo del Diablo) (Spain) - Directed by: Guillermo del Toro, Distributed by: Sony Pictures Classics

=== Best Young Actress in an International Film ===
★ Aleksandra Gietner - Hi, Tereska (Czesc Tereska) (Poland) - Directed by: Robert Gliński, Produced by: Propaganda AG

=== Best International Family Film ===
★ Taliesin Jones (Wales) - Starring: John-Paul Macleod as "Taliesin", Directed by: Martin Duffy, Produced by: Snake River Films, Distributed by: Impact Entertainment

=== Outstanding Young International Performers ===
★ The Mini Beats (Germany)

=== Most Promising Young Newcomer ===
★ Rupert Grint (England) - "Ron Weasley" from Warner Brothers' Harry Potter and the Sorcerer's Stone

=== Outstanding Young Performer in Live Theater ===
★ Christopher Massey - From the Los Angeles production of Disney's The Lion King

=== Outstanding Young Voice-Over ===
★ Aria Noelle Curzon - The voice of "Ducky" in Universal's The Land Before Time (1997–2001)

=== Outstanding Young Performer in a National Commercial Featuring Youth ===
★ Tyler Patrick Jones - "Hallmark Greeting Cards"

=== The Michael Landon Award ===
==== Community Service to Youth ====
★ Promises - Documentary directed by: Justine Shapiro, B.Z. Goldberg, Carlos Bolado; Produced by: Promises Film Project

=== The Jackie Coogan Award ===
==== Outstanding Contribution to Youth Through Motion Pictures ====
★ Tir Nan Og - Short film directed by: Danica DeCosto, Starring: Sarah Swanberg

=== The Mickey Rooney Award ===
==== Former Child Star Life Achievement Award ====
★ Alison Arngrim - For her role as "Nellie Oleson" in the TV series Little House on the Prairie (1974–1981).
