= Good Night, Sleep Tight =

Good Night, Sleep Tight may refer to:

- Good Night, Sleep Tight (anthology), a 2000 children's poetry anthology collated by Ivan Jones and Mal Lewis Jones
- Good Night, Sleep Tight (Fox book), a 2012 children's picture book by Mem Fox, illustrated by Judy Horacek
