= Jim Eldridge =

Prolific English radio, film, and TV screenplay writer

- Born: 1944 (age 81–82) London, England
- Occupation: Children's author and screenwriter.
- Period: 1965–present
- Genre: Comedy, drama, adventure, science fiction

Jim Eldridge (born November 1944) is an English radio, film and television screenwriter with hundreds of radio and TV scripts broadcast in the United Kingdom and across the world in a career spanning over 30 years.

Eldridge is the creator and writer of radio shows including Shut UP, King Street Junior, Coming Alive, Crosswords, Albert and Me, Parsley Sidings and The Demon Headmaster. On TV, he has created children's science fiction drama Powers, Time of My Life and Uncle Jack and written for The Ghost Hunter, Julia Jekyll and Harriet Hyde, and Up the Elephant and Round the Castle, in addition to other TV and radio series.

In 1971 he sold his first sitcom to the BBC and had his first book commissioned. Since then he has had more than 100 books published, which have sold over three million copies. He lives in Kent with his wife.

== Bibliography ==
"Warpath" Series

- Warpath 1: Tank Attack
- Warpath 2: Deadly Skies
- Warpath 3: Behind Enemy Lines
- Warpath 4: Depth Charge Danger
- Warpath 5: Last Convoy
- Warpath 6: Beach Assault
- Warpath 7: Night Bomber
- Warpath 8: Island Of Fear

"My Story" Series

- My Story: The Trenches (2002)
- My Story: Armada (2002)
- My Story: Flying Ace (2003)
- My Story: Spy Smuggler (2004)
- My Story: Desert Danger (2005)

"Museum mysteries"
- Murder at the Fitzwilliam (2018)

- Murder at the British Museum (2019)
- Murder at the Ashmolean (2019)
- Murder at the Manchester Museum (2020)
- Murder at the Natural History Museum (2020)
- Murder at Madame Tussauds (2021)
- Murder at the National Gallery (2022)
- Murder at the Victoria and Albert Museum (2022)
- Murder at the Tower of London (2023)
- Murder at the Louvre (2024)

World War 2 Mysteries featuring Detective Chief Inspector Coburg, Rosa Weeks, and Detective Sergeant Lampson

Hotel Mysteries:

- Murder at the Ritz: The Stylish Wartime Whodunnit (2021)
- Murder at the Savoy: The Sophisticated Wartime Whodunnit (2021)
- Murder at Claridge's: The Elegant Wartime Whodunnit (2022)

London Underground Station Mysteries:

- Murder at Aldwych Station (2022)
- Murder at Down Street Station (2023)
- Murder at Lord's Station (2024)
- Murder at Whitechapel Road Station (2024)

Cathedral Mysteries:

- Murder at St. Paul's Cathedral (2025)
- Murder at Canterbury Cathedral (2026)

== Writing credits ==
Production	Notes	Broadcaster
Time of My Life	6 episodes (1980)	BBC1
Up the Elephant and Round the Castle	"May the Best Man Win" (1983); "The Hostage" (1985); "A Taxing Problem" (1985)	ITV
Bad Boyes	16 episodes (co-written with Duncan Eldridge, 1987–1988)	BBC1
Uncle Jack and Operation Green	6 episodes (1990)	BBC1
Time Riders	4 episodes (1991)	Children's ITV
Uncle Jack and the Loch Noch Monster	6 episodes (1991)	BBC1
Spatz	"Talent Contest" (1991); "Witness" (1992)	Children's ITV
Uncle Jack and the Dark Side of the Moon	6 episodes (1992)	BBC1
Uncle Jack and Cleopatra's Mummy	6 episodes (1993)	BBC1
Harry's Mad	"That's Entertainment" (1996); "Spooks" (1996); "Gambling Is a Risky Business" (1996)	CITV
Woof!	"When My Sheep Comes In" (1997)	ITV
The Legend of the Lost Keys	10 episodes (1998)	BBC2
Julia Jekyll and Harriet Hyde	6 episodes (1998)	CBBC
Monster TV	26 episodes (1999–2001)	BBC2; CBBC
The Ghost Hunter	18 episodes (co-written with Ivan Jones and Roy Apps, 2000–2002)	BBC1
Powers	13 episodes (2004)	BBC1

== Awards and nominations ==
Year	Award	Work	Category	Result	Reference
1973	Writers' Guild of Great Britain Award	Lines from My Grandfather's Forehead	Best Light Entertainment Show (Radio)	Won	
1987	Sunday Times Literary Award	Save Our Planet: An Anti-Nuclear Guide for Teenagers	—N/a	Nominated	
1988	Royal Television Society Awards	Bad Boyes	Best Children's Drama Series (with Duncan Eldridge)	Won	
1988	Sony Radio Awards	King Street Junior	—N/a	Nominated	
1989	British Academy Television Awards	Bad Boyes	Best Children’s TV Series (with Duncan Eldridge)	Nominated	
1991	Writers' Guild of Great Britain Award	King Street Junior	—N/a	Nominated	
1992	Writers' Guild of Great Britain Award	King Street Junior	—N/a	Nominated	
1998	Rose d'Or	Upwardly Mobile	Shortlist for Best Situation Comedy	Nominated	
1999	Chicago International Festival of Children's Films	Whizziwig: Double Trouble	Short Children’s Film/Video (Live Action Category)	Nominated	
1999	Prix Danube	Whizziwig: Double Trouble	Best Children’s Drama	Nominated	
