= Sophie Ward =

British actress

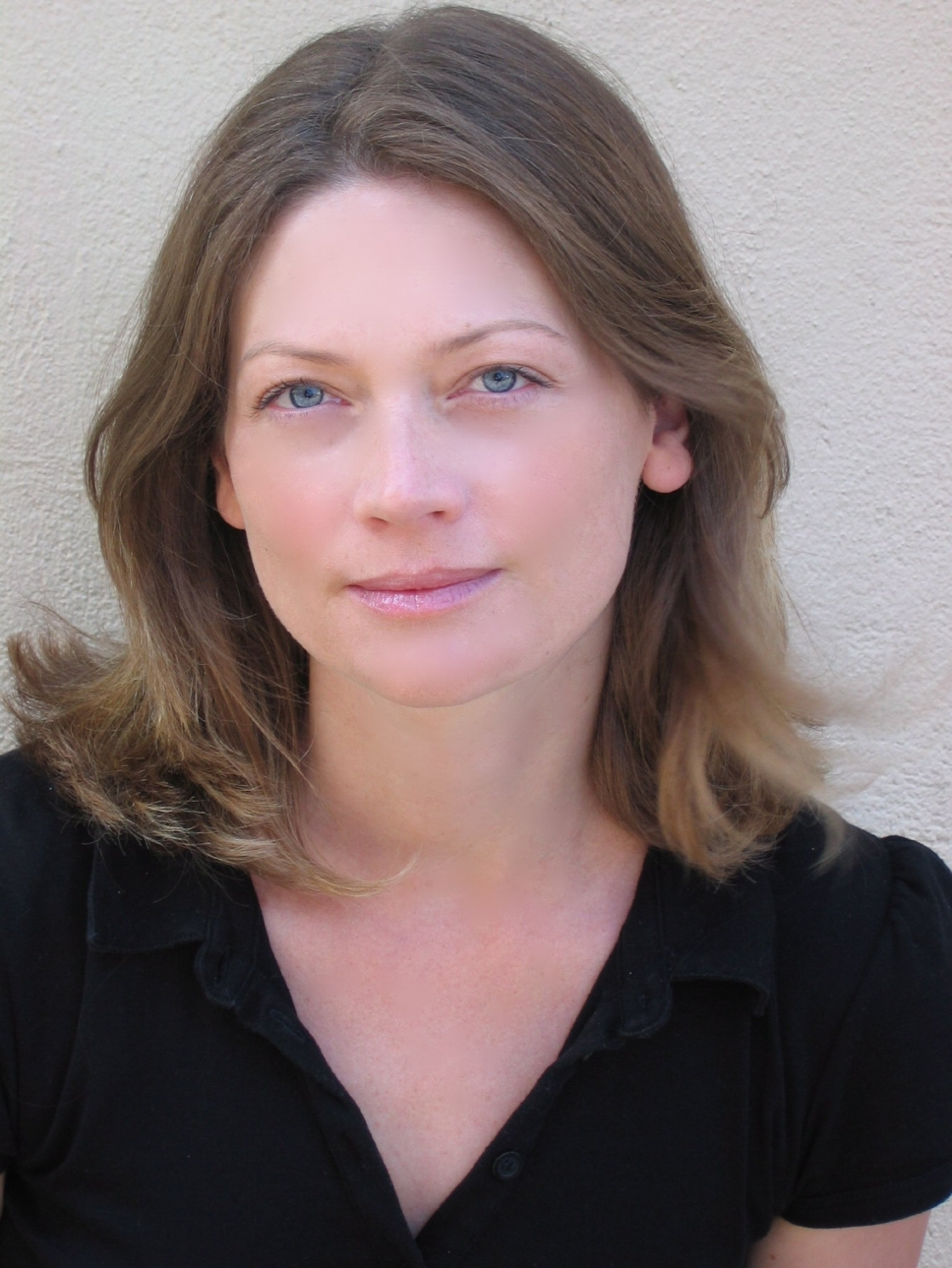
- Born: Sophie Anna Ward; 30 December 1964 (age 61); London, England
- Occupations: Actress; writer
- Years active: 1974–present
- Notable work: Love and Other Thought Experiments (2020)
- Spouse: Paul Hobson (m. 1988; div. 1996) Rena Brannan (m. 2014)
- Children: 2
- Parent: Simon Ward
- Website: sophieannaward.com

Sophie Anna Ward (born 30 December 1964) is a British stage and screen actress, and a writer of non-fiction and fiction from London. As an actress, she played Jocelyn Sheffield in The Nanny; she also played Elizabeth Hardy, the female lead in Barry Levinson's Young Sherlock Holmes (1985), and in other feature film roles including in Cary Joji Fukunaga's period drama Jane Eyre (2011), and Jane Sanger's horror feature Swiperight (2020). In 1982 she had a role in the Academy Award-winning short film A Shocking Accident. On television she played Dr Helen Trent in the ITV police period drama series Heartbeat from 2004 to 2006, Sophia Byrne in the series Holby City from 2008 to 2010, Lady Ellen Hoxley in the series Land Girls from 2009 to 2011, and Lady Verinder in the mini-series The Moonstone (2016).

== Early life and education ==
Sophie Anna Ward was born in Hammersmith, London, in 1964, the eldest of the three daughters of Alexandra (née Malcolm) and actor Simon Ward, one of whom, Kitty, went on to marry comedian Michael McIntyre. In childhood, Sophia Ward trained at the Anna Scher Theatre. She earned a BA honours degree in English with Philosophy from the Open University.

She returned to higher education, earning a PhD in English and Comparative Literature at Goldsmiths, University of London in 2019, where, according to Ward, her research focused on "thought experiments in philosophy of mind and the use of narrative in philosophy, looking at issues of consciousness and AI, and the meeting between literature and philosophy."

== Acting career ==
Ward started work as an actress when she was aged 10, and has worked in film, television and theatre. She trained as a dancer under ballerina Merle Park. She co-starred in 1975 alongside Gwyneth Strong in an episode of the children's supernatural anthology series Shadows and had an early film role in Full Circle (1977). In 1983, she had a brief, non-speaking role at the very end of the Tony Scott vampire movie The Hunger; in the credits, her character is listed as "Girl In London House". Another early film role was in the film Young Sherlock Holmes (1985), directed by Barry Levinson. Other films included Return to Oz (1985) playing Princess Mombi II, Little Dorrit (1987) and A Summer Story (1988), and she also portrayed a dancer in Roxy Music's 1982 music video "Avalon".

Ward's later films include Out of Bounds (2003), in which she co-starred with Sophia Myles and Celia Imrie, and Book of Blood (2008), co-starring Jonas Armstrong and Reg Fuller. She also appeared in Cary Fukunaga's Jane Eyre (2011). She has worked with Susan Sarandon in The Hunger directed by Tony Scott, Liv Ullmann in A Time of Indifference, directed by Mauro Bolognini, and Elizabeth Taylor in Young Toscanini (1988), directed by Franco Zeffirelli.

Ward's television work includes the mini-series A Dark-Adapted Eye with Helena Bonham Carter, and the fantasy Dinotopia. From 2004 until 2006, Ward had the recurring role of Dr Helen Trent in long-running ITV drama Heartbeat. In 2008, Ward joined the cast of Holby City in a recurring role as Sophia Byrne. She appeared in the BBC series Land Girls from 2009 to 2011.

Ward has appeared in several Glasgow Citizens' Theatre productions including Private Lives (as Amanda), Don Carlos (as Queen Elizabeth) and in Hamlet (as Ophelia).

Ward was considered a "Face of the 1980s" as a Vogue model.

Ward acted in the 1982 Academy Award-winning short film A Shocking Accident. Her role in the first (2009) series of Land Girls earned her a regional (Midlands) RTS Television Award for best acting performance (by a female) in that year.

== Writing ==
Especially since beginning her advanced academic work, Ward has been writing professionally, including for newspapers The Guardian, The Times and The Spectator, and the online journalism network The Conversation. While undertaking her post-graduate study, Ward wrote a short work, "Sunbed", which won the 2018 Royal Academy Pin Drop Award for new writers, in the short story category.

Ward's debut novel, Love and Other Thought Experiments, was published in 2020 by Corsair, an imprint of Little, Brown Book Group. It was longlisted for both the Desmond Elliott Prize and the Booker Prize in its publication year.

Ward's second novel, The Schoolhouse, was published in 2022.

== Personal life ==
Ward married veterinary surgeon Paul Hobson in 1988, and the couple have two sons, born in 1989 and 1993. After Ward became involved with Korean-American poet and writer Rena Brannan and coming out in 1996, Hobson and Ward divorced. Ward and Brannan had a civil partnership ceremony in 2005, followed by marriage after it was legalised in 2014.

Ward and Brannan divide their time between Britain and the United States. Ward's brother-in-law is comedian Michael McIntyre.

Ward has become known as an LGBT activist, and her 2014 long-form essay, a strong statement regarding equality of marriage rights, was published by Guardian Shorts, The Guardian's e-book publishing house. It later appeared in serialised form in issues of the newspaper. Ward has hosted several of the annual European Diversity Awards, including in 2016, 2019, and 2021.

== Written works ==
- Love and other thought experiments. London: Corsair. 2020. ISBN 978-1-4721-5460-6. OCLC 1085164094. (Novel)
- A Marriage Proposal: The importance of equal marriage and what it means for all of us. Guardian Shorts. 2014. (Non-fiction)

== Filmography ==
=== Film ===
- Full Circle – 1977
- The Lords of Discipline – 1983
- The Hunger – 1983
- Return to Oz – 1985
- Young Sherlock Holmes – 1985
- A Summer Story – 1988
- Aria – 1987
- Little Dorrit – 1988
- Young Toscanini – 1988
- A Demon in My View – 1989
- Una vita scellerata – 1989
- Seduction of a Priest – 1990
- Wuthering Heights – 1992
- Waxwork II: Lost in Time – 1992
- Crime & Punishment – 1993
- The Big Fall – 1997
- Bella Donna – 1998
- Crime and Punishment – 2002
- Out of Bounds – 2003
- Book of Blood – 2008
- Jane Eyre – 2011
- The Moonstone – 2016

=== Television ===
- Shadows anthology series, Series 1, "The Other Window" (1975)
- Too Old to Fight – 1981
- A Time of Indifference – 1987
- Casanova – 1987
- Miss Marple (TV series): A Caribbean Mystery – 1989
- The Shell Seekers – 1989
- The Strauss Dynasty – 1990
- Class of '61 – 1991
- Events at Drimaghleen – 1991
- A Dark-Adapted Eye – 1992
- Taking Liberty – 1993
- Chiller (TV series): Prophecy – 1994
- MacGyver: Lost Treasure of Atlantis – 1994
- A Village Affair – 1995
- Legacy – 1999
- Crusade – 1999
- The Inspector Lynley Mysteries – 2001
- Dinotopia – 2002
- Heartbeat – 2004-2006, series 14-15 (as "Dr Helen Trent")
- Holby City – 2008
- Land Girls – 2009, Series 1 (awarded Best Acting Performance (Female) in the 2010 Royal Television Regional Awards [Midlands])
- Lewis – 2010
- Land Girls – 2010, Series 2
- New Tricks – 2010, Series 7
- Hustle – 2012
- A Very British Scandal – Janet Kidd – 2021

=== Guest appearances ===
- The Nanny– 1999 ("The Wedding Episode", "The Fran in the Mirror", "The Hanukkah Episode")
- Crusade – 1999 ("The Path of Sorrows")
- Rhona – 2000 ("The Fridge")
- Peak Practice – 2001 ("Blind spot")

=== Short films ===
- "Avalon" – 1982, music video for Roxy Music
- A Shocking Accident – 1982 (Academy Award-winner for best short film)
- Rock-a-bye Baby – 1983
- A Prayer for the Dying – 1984
- The Malady – 1985
- Chinese Whispers – 1998
- Bubblegum – 2004
- Missing Link – 2009
- David Rose – 2011

=== Child performances ===
- The Chester Mysteries – 1974
- Shadows – 1975 ("The Other Window")
- Full Circle – 1975 ("The Haunting of Julia" US)
- The Copter Kids – 1976
- Ibsen: The Wild Duck – 1977
- The Brensham People – 1977
- Too Old to Fight – 1980
