= Albert and Me =

UK radio programme

- Genre: Sitcom
- Running time: 30 mins
- Country of origin: United Kingdom
- Language(s): English
- Home station: BBC Radio 2
- Syndicates: BBC Radio 4 Extra
- Starring: Richard Beckinsale (Series 1); Robert Lindsay (Series 2); Pat Coombs
- Written by: Jim Eldridge
- Produced by: John Fawcett Wilson
- Original release: 5 November 1977 – 4 May 1983
- No. of series: 2
- No. of episodes: 17

Albert and Me is a British radio comedy series that was broadcast on BBC Radio 2 in 1977 and 1983. The first series starred Richard Beckinsale as Bryan Archer, a single parent struggling to find a job and to bring up his child, with the help of his mother, played by Pat Coombs, who also did the voice of baby Albert. Beckinsale played the role of Bryan for the original pilot and the following eight episodes, which were broadcast in 1977. Due to Beckinsale's death in 1979, Robert Lindsay took over the role of Bryan for the second series, which consisted of eight episodes and was broadcast in 1983.

The writer was Jim Eldridge. BBC Radio 4 Extra has run repeats of the show in recent times. The complete two series were made available for digital download by BBC Digital Audio in January 2021.
