= George Asprey =

British stage, film, and television actor (born 1966)

George Asprey (born 1 October 1966) is a British stage, film, and television character actor. Since 2008, Asprey has played the part of Scar in the West End theatre production of the musical The Lion King.

== Early life ==
Of Asprey's origins, the Daily Mirror said that his world had been one of "indecent wealth" and he was not born with a silver spoon in his mouth but a "silver shovel". The only son of Edward Asprey, of Asprey the jewellers, he was educated at Charterhouse School and was expected to join the family business on leaving school. Asprey rebelled, wishing instead to pursue an acting career. This was not welcomed by his father, and the pair did not speak for several months. Asprey subsequently studied business in the United States, with a view to joining the family firm, but while there was cast in a stage production of The Tempest. This led him to audition for entry to the London Academy of Music and Dramatic Art (LAMDA), and at the age of twenty he was one of nineteen new students accepted out of some 2,500 applicants.

== Career ==
Soon after leaving LAMDA, Asprey was cast as Sean Devereux in the television film The Dying of the Light (Yorkshire Television, 1992). His character was a UNICEF aid worker who was murdered, and Asprey received good reviews for the performance. He appeared as a policeman in Mary Shelley's Frankenstein (1994).

In 1995, Asprey was cast as Tony Paterson, a promiscuous hairdresser, in the ITV television serial An Independent Man. In 2003 he played Doc Holliday in a BBC production, in 2016 appeared as Walter Monckton in The Crown, and in 2021 played Jonathan Rees QC in Four Lives.

Asprey's longest-running part on stage is as Scar in the West End production of The Lion King, which he began to play in 2008 and was still performing in October 2019, when in an interview he described Scar as "probably the greatest baddie that Disney has ever written". The production had to close in March 2020 due to the COVID-19 lockdown, but it reopened at the Lyceum Theatre in July 2021, with Asprey returning as Scar.

== Personal life ==
In 1992, while they were both appearing in The Sound of Music, Asprey dated Amanda Holden.

Asprey and his wife Kirsten have three daughters.

== Filmography ==
=== Film ===
Year	Title	Role	Notes	Ref.
1992	The Dying of the Light	Sean Devereux	Television film	
1994	Mary Shelley's Frankenstein	Policeman		
2000	Secrets & Lines	Andrew H	Television film	
2002	AKA	David, Lord Glendening		
2003	Out of Bounds	Matthew Van Huet		
2005	The Wedding Date	Pat		
2005	Ian Fleming: Bondmaker	Officer	Television film	
2005	The Greatest Game Ever Played	Wilfrid Reid		
2005	Riot at the Rite	Journalist	Television film	
2019	The Gentlemen	Lord Snowball		
2021	Without Remorse	Denis Stewart		
2024	The Ministry of Ungentlemanly Warfare	Commander Hopkirk		
2025	Heavyweight	Harry		

=== Television ===
Year	Title	Role	Notes	Ref.
1994	Screen One	2nd Lieutenant	Episode: "A Breed of Heroes"	
1995	An Independent Man	Tony Patterson	Series regular; 7 episodes	
1997	The Peter Principle	Simon	Episode: "The Midas Touch"	
1998	Coming Home	Dr Jeremy Wells	Miniseries; 2 episodes	
1998	Supply & Demand	Terry James	Episode: "Blood Ties"	
1998	The Bill	Anthony Howarth	Episode: "Trial Run"	
1998–1999	Trial & Retribution	DC Jack Hutchins	Recurring role; 4 episodes	
1999	Nancherrow	Jeremy Wells	Miniseries; 2 episodes	
2003	Holby City	Simon Hargreaves	Episode: "Love Nor Money"	
2006	The Afternoon Play	Boniface	Episode: "Molly"	
2006	The Gil Mayo Mysteries	Adam Kendrick	Episode: "A Species of Revenge"	
2006	The Bill	Andrew King	Episode: "Little Black Book"	
2007	Waking the Dead	Young Bruno Rivelli	Episode: "Mask of Sanity"	
2007	The Wild West	Doc Holliday	Episode: "The Gunfight at the OK Corral"	
2008	New Tricks	Cameron Wyatt	Episode: "A Face for Radio"	
2009	Psychoville	John George Haigh	Episode: "Joy"	
2010	Upstairs Downstairs	Oswald Mosley	Recurring role; 3 episodes	
2016–2017	The Crown	Walter Monckton	Recurring role; 6 episodes	
2021	Sex Education	Jeff Groff	Episode: "Series 3, Episode 6"	
2022	Four Lives	Jonathon Rees QC	Episode: "Episode 3"	
2024	Grantchester	Professor Henry Waddingham	Episode: "Series 9, Episode 6"	
2024	A Very Royal Scandal	Alastair Watson	Episode: "Episode 1"	
