= Gillian Wright =

English actress (born 1959)

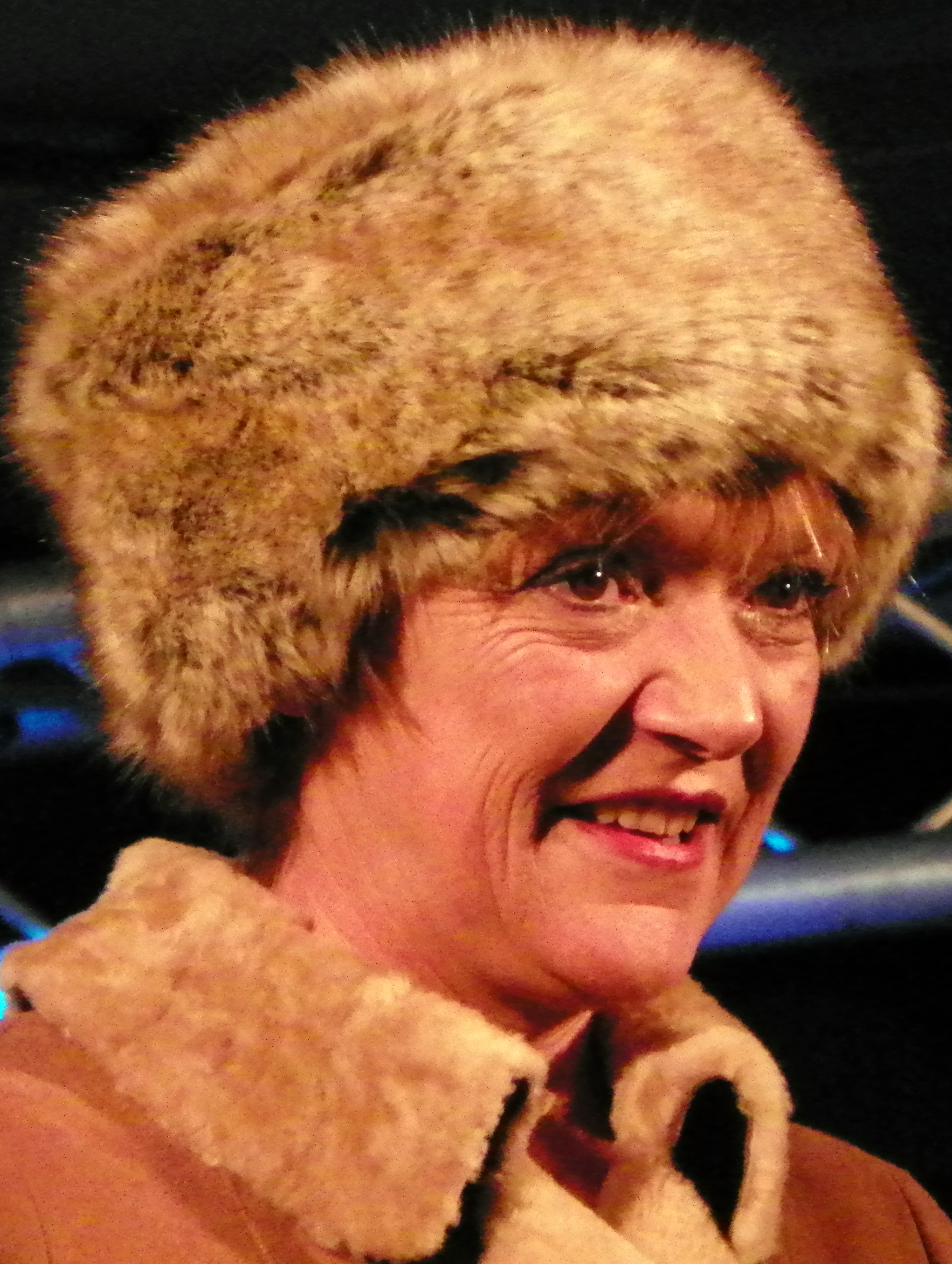
- Wright in 2013
- Born: 7 December 1959 (age 66); Bermondsey, London, England
- Occupation: Actress
- Years active: 1993–present
- Television: ChuckleVision; Sir Gadabout: The Worst Knight in the Land; EastEnders

Gillian Wright (born 7 December 1959) is an English actress, known for playing Jean Slater on the BBC soap opera EastEnders since 2004, for which she has won numerous awards. She previously worked as a drama teacher and a theatre director before occupying acting roles.

== Career ==
Wright's first television role was in an episode of ChuckleVision as Mrs. Stone in 1994. She went on to portray guest roles in Casualty and Holby City, before portraying the nanny in the CITV children's comedy Sir Gadabout: The Worst Knight in the Land for two series between 2002 and 2003. She also appeared in episodes of Doctors, Calendar Girls and Heartbeat, before taking on her prestigious role of Jean Slater in the BBC soap opera EastEnders. Wright was originally signed for one episode in December 2004, but bosses brought her back into the series a year later for four more episodes. After guest starring in two episodes of rival soap opera Coronation Street, she then returned to EastEnders on a recurring basis until her character moved into Albert Square in November 2007. In 2006, she collected a Mental Health Media Award for her portrayal of Jean, a person living with bipolar disorder.

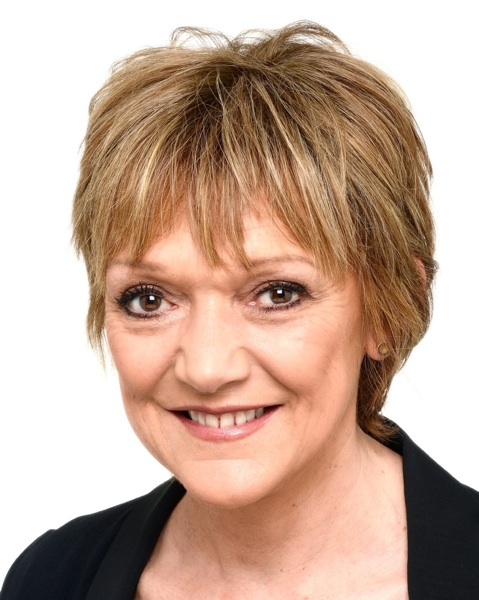
Wright has portrayed the role of Jean Slater in the BBC soap opera EastEnders since 2004

Wright's departure from the series was announced in 2010, along with her on-screen daughter Stacey Slater, played by Lacey Turner, but it was later confirmed that she would return in spring 2011. In 2012, she won the 'Best Actress' award at the Inside Soap Awards. Wright departed EastEnders again in 2013 and returned for a short stint in August 2014. She also guest starred in one episode of hospital drama, Holby City in early 2015. After making numerous guest appearances from 2015 to 2017, the character of Jean was reintroduced in 2018 by former executive consultant John Yorke. In 2019, Wright won the award for Best Dramatic Performance at that year's British Soap Awards.

=== Theatre ===
Wright is also an established theatre actress, and is a visiting director and workshop leader at drama schools, universities and with young people with special needs. She is a co-founder of Pilot Theatre, at York's Theatre Royal.

In December 2011, she played the Fairy godmother in the pantomime Dick Whittington and His Cat at the Aylesbury Waterside Theatre, starring alongside Jonathan Wilkes.

In September 2013, she appeared in the world premiere of five visceral new short plays, under the collective title Religion and Anarchy, at the Jermyn Street Theatre. From December 2013 to January 2014, she appeared as the Fairy Godmother in Cinderella at the Gordon Craig Theatre in Stevenage. She also performed at the Theatre Royal, Norwich during a production of Sleeping Beauty in 2017.

== Filmography ==
Year	Title	Role	Notes
1994	ChuckleVision	Mrs. Stone	Episode: "Mind over Marrow"
1998	Casualty	Amber Stevens	Episode: "The Ties That Bind"
2003	Holby City	Candice Holloway	Episode: "Can't Always Get What You Want"
2002–2003	Sir Gadabout: The Worst Knight in the Land	Nanny	2 series; main cast; 19 episodes
2003	Calendar Girls	Eddie's woman	Film
2003	Doctors	Carol	Episode: "The Time Is Right"
2004	Heartbeat	Barbara Simner	Episode: "Scent of a Kill"
2004–present	EastEnders	Jean Slater	Series regular
2005	Coronation Street	Yvonne	2 episodes
2006	Dalziel and Pascoe	Pat Richardson	Episodes: "A Death in the Family: Parts 1 & 2"
2006	Silent Witness	Dr. Angeline Parry	Episode: "Terminus: Part 1"
2006	The Bill	Sharon Little	3 episodes
2007	Spooks	Karen Dugan	Episode: "The Virus: Part 2"
2013	Tamwar Tales – The Life of an Assistant Market Inspector	Jean Slater	Episode: "Jean"
2015	Holby City	Lydia Rathbone	Episode: "Tug of Love"

== Awards and nominations ==
Year	Award	Category	Result	Ref.
2011	Inside Soap Awards	Funniest Performance	Shortlisted	
2012	Inside Soap Awards	Best Actress	Won	
2013	TV Choice Awards	Best Soap Actress	Shortlisted	
2019	TV Choice Awards	Best Soap Actress	Shortlisted	
2019	The British Soap Awards	Best Female Dramatic Performance	Won	
2019	Inside Soap Awards	Best Actress	Shortlisted	
2019	I Talk Telly Awards	Best Soap Performance	Nominated	
2022	The British Soap Awards	Best Leading Performer	Shortlisted	
2022	The British Soap Awards	Best Dramatic Performance	Nominated	
2022	The British Soap Awards	Best On-Screen Partnership (shared with Lacey Turner)	Won	
2022	27th National Television Awards	Serial Drama Performance	Shortlisted	
2022	Inside Soap Awards	Best Double Act (shared with Turner)	Shortlisted	
2022	Inside Soap Awards	Best Actress	Won	
2022	TV Choice Awards	Best Soap Actress	Won	
2022	I Talk Telly Awards	Best Soap Performance	Nominated	
