= Ian Fleming: Bondmaker =

2005 British television drama about James Bond author Ian Fleming

- Genre: Drama
- Directed by: John Alexander
- Starring: Ben Daniels; Emily Woof; Pip Torrens
- Composers: Andrew Phillips; Michael Vickerage
- Country of origin: United Kingdom
- Original language: English

Production
- Executive producers: Adam Kemp; Jacquie Hughes; Leanne Klein
- Producer: Colette Flight
- Running time: 60 minutes

Original release
- Network: BBC One
- Release: 28 August 2005

Ian Fleming: Bondmaker is a 2005 BBC Television drama telling the life story of the British author Ian Fleming.

== Cast ==
- George Asprey as Officer
