= Bad Boyes =

- Genre: Children's drama; comedy
- Written by: Jim Eldridge; Duncan Eldridge
- Starring: Steven Kember; Warren Brian; Anna Dawson; Susan Jameson; Dean Harris; Gregory Cox; Christopher Owen; Nicola Greenhill; Helen Cotterill; Lila Kaye
- Composer: Jonathan Cohen
- Country of origin: United Kingdom
- Original language: English
- No. of series: 2
- No. of episodes: 16

Production
- Producer: Jeremy Swan
- Running time: 25 mins
- Production company: BBC

Original release
- Network: BBC1
- Release: 15 September 1987 – 22 December 1988

Bad Boyes is a 1987 British children's comedy-drama television series produced by the BBC and which was aired on BBC1's afternoon Children's BBC slot for two series in 1987 and 1988. It was written by Jim Eldridge and starred Paul Kember as the eponymous hero, Brian Arthur Derek (BAD) Boyes, a mischievous schoolboy who had a tendency to get himself into trouble and consequently had a series of misadventures. He was especially prone to clashing with his ultra-strict form teacher Mr Wiggis (Gregory Cox). As for his parents – his kindly but weak-willed father (Dean Harris) was always completely fooled by his son's innocent facade, but his abrasive mother (Susan Jameson) rather less so – it rarely took her long to get to the bottom of her son's devilish plots, and her war-cry of "Bri-an!" was always a sure sign that either he'd been rumbled or that he soon would be.

The series also starred Warren Brian as Edward 'Slug' Slogg, the hulking school bully who often clashed with Brian, Nicola Greenhill as Bernetta Vincent, Brian's close friend and confidante, Christopher Owen as their well-meaning but ineffectual headmaster Mr Blake, Helen Cotterill as Brian's mother's neurotic and decidedly oddball friend Rose Moncrieff and Lila Kaye as Brian's grumpy and mean-spirited Gran. In addition, a pre-Birds of a Feather Linda Robson appeared in a few early episodes as Miss King, a teacher and would-be love-interest for Wiggis at the school, and Sam Kelly and Christine Ozanne appeared as the Boyes' near-neighbours Mr and Mrs Worple, whose cats Brian tried to look after while the couple were on holiday, with predictably disastrous consequences.

Writer Jim Eldridge and his son, Duncan Eldridge, had created a character for the "Diary of X" sections of their successful How To Handle Grown-Ups series of children's books which detailed the exploits of an anonymous schoolboy's many schemes, dodges and scrapes. When the Eldridges met with the BBC about developing the concept into a children's comedy series, they came up with a name for the character and fleshed out the scenario for the television series. The actual diary framing device element was dropped early on in the show's planning stages, due in part to avoid comparisons with the very successful The Secret Diary of Adrian Mole, Aged 13¾ books and television series, as well as it being felt that the diary sections simply weren't required for the format of the television series.

Although not generally recognised as a classic Children's BBC series of the era, the series performed well with its target age group and proving popular enough that two spin-off paperbacks, adapting stories from the first and second series respectively, were released. However, plans for a Christmas one-off episode and a third series were shelved, reportedly at recommendation of then-Director-General of the BBC Sir Michael Checkland to Head of Children's Programming Anna Home and following several letters from parents on Points of View voicing concern that, whilst Brian Boyes was mostly seen as mischievous but harmless in the vein of Dennis the Menace and various other 'naughty schoolboy' characters from over the years, the character and his endless manipulative schemes, and the lies he told to get away with them, were very seldom seen to have any sort of comeuppance or redemption beyond the occasional telling off – or risk of – from his mother, with concern that this conduct, without illustrated effect of punishment or correction, could be viewed as setting a bad example to young viewers. Despite this, series 1 and 2 were repeated in 1989 and 1990 respectively, but as a result no further episodes were made.
