= Lines from My Grandfather's Forehead =

UK comedy radio sketch show 1971–1972

- Running time: 30 minutes
- Country of origin: UK
- Language: English
- Home station: BBC Radio 4
- Starring: Ronnie Barker
- Created by: Ronnie Barker
- Produced by: John Fawcett Wilson
- Original release: 15 February 1971 – 26 July 1972
- No. of series: 2
- No. of episodes: 16

Lines From My Grandfather's Forehead, is a British comedy radio sketch show first broadcast on BBC Radio 4 in 1971.

== Overview ==
Two series of eight episodes of the show were broadcast, the first from 15 February 1971 to 5 April 1971, the second was transmitted from 9 July 1972 to 26 July 1972. In addition, there were two special episodes. A Christmas special, entitled Lines From My Grandfather Christmas's Forehead, was broadcast on 24 December 1971; and a compilation of selected items from past editions, under the title Just A Few Lines From My Grandfather's Forehead, was broadcast on 27 August 1977.

The show was created by BBC Radio producer John Fawcett Wilson and Ronnie Barker and featured Barker together with Terence Brady and Pauline Yates and Gordon Langford at the piano. Some editions also featured guitarist Dick Abell. The theme music was a short excerpt taken from Divertissement by Jacques Ibert.

Each programme was a sequence of comedy sketches, monologues and comic songs. The writers were credited on each recording but the items they wrote were not named, so identifying the author of a particular item is difficult. Among the credited writers was Gerald Wiley, a pseudonym used by Barker to submit material without using his own name. Other writers for the series included Jim Eldridge, Spike Milligan and Harold Pinter. The then director of programmes for BBC Radio, Gerard Mansell, described the show as having a "very individual type of humour, quite unlike that of any other TV or radio programme".

== Sources ==
- Elmes, Simon (2008). And Now on Radio 4: A Celebration of the World's Best Radio Station. Arrow. ISBN 978-0099505372.
- Webber, Richard (2011). Remembering Ronnie Barker. Arrow. ISBN 978-0099545569.
