= Big Kids =

British-American television programme

- Big Kids logo
- Genre: Children's television Comedy
- Created by: Lucy Daniel-Raby
- Developed by: Elaine Sperber
- Directed by: Baz Taylor
- Starring: Imogen Stubbs; Duncan Duff; Matt Adams; Kelly Salmon
- Composer: Tony Flynn
- Countries of origin: United Kingdom; United States
- Original language: English
- No. of series: 1
- No. of episodes: 13

Production
- Executive producer: Cas Lester
- Producer: Jacinta Peel
- Editor: Ian Williams
- Camera setup: Peter Woodley
- Running time: 24 minutes

Original release
- Network: BBC One (UK); Noggin (U.S.)
- Release: 27 September – 20 December 2000

Big Kids is a 13-episode children's comedy television series created by Lucy Daniel-Raby. The series is a British-American co-production of the BBC and the American network Noggin. It premiered on CBBC on BBC One on 27 September 2000 and on the Noggin channel on 29 January 2001. All 13 episodes were aired on Noggin's sister channel, Nickelodeon, from 9 to 30 March 2001.

== History ==
According to the show's developer, Elaine Sperber, the writers "had to tread carefully" to make sure that the content was relevant to both UK and U.S. children. She said, "We had a great relationship with Noggin ... but when you co-produce with North Americans, you always run into problems over British accents and language. We couldn’t use terms like 'snogging' in Big Kids because no one in the U.S. would have understood it." The magazine Kidscreen wrote that "children start drinking far earlier in Britain than they do in North America, so a sequence showing booze being consumed at a school dance had to be watered down."

On Noggin, the show was aired as part of a primetime programming block called "The Hubbub," which allowed viewers to submit comments through Noggin's website and see them live on-air. Noggin grouped the final two episodes as an hour-long special, and they aired on 25 March 2001. Leading up to them, Noggin reran a marathon of the entire series, promoted as the Big Kids Big Marathon. From April 2002 to January 2004, Noggin aired reruns of Big Kids during its overnight programming block, The N.

== Plot ==
The show follows the lives of the Spiller family: Simon, Kate, and their parents, Sarah, a piano teacher, and Geoff, a doctor. When the family attends a school charity event, a hypnotist and entertainer named Ming the Mind Master uses Sarah and Geoff in a performance. After the show is over, Kate and Simon realize that their parents have never been properly unhypnotized. At seemingly random moments, they black out and begin to act like children.

The two siblings have to deal with keeping their parents under control in their hypnotized state, trying to get their parents to believe what happens when they black out, and trying to discover what triggers the change. Simon tries to keep his parents' hypnosis a secret from his best friend, Jake, who lives across the street and often visits at inopportune times. During trances, Sarah and Geoff engage in behaviour for which they would otherwise scold their children, while Kate and Simon are forced to act like mature adults. According to Noggin, the show was meant to explore "the complex and sometimes chaotic relationship between parent and child."

Eventually, the children convince their parents by showing them filmed footage, and discover that the trigger is "ming", or any word with "ming" in it, just like the hypnotist's name. They finally track down Ming at a fête and convince him to 'unhypnotise' their parents, which appears to restore them to normal. However, their childish behaviour on the carousel leaves the children confused; whether Sarah and Geoff are acting like this deliberately or have fallen back into a state of hypnosis is left ambiguous.

== Episode list ==
1. Performance by a Hypnotist
2. Kate Avoids Friends
3. Videotaping Mum and Dad
4. Library/Shopping
5. Restaurant
6. New Car/Concert
7. Museum
8. Aunt Muriel
9. Chicken Pox
10. Puppy
11. Simon Pursues Melanie
12. Trigger Revealed
13. Finding Hypnotist

== Cast ==
- Duncan Duff as Dr. Geoffrey "Geoff" Spiller
- Imogen Stubbs as Sarah Spiller
- Matt Adams as Simon Spiller
- Kelly Salmon as Kate Spiller
- Sam Green as Jake Tyler
- Jasper Britton as Ming the Mind Master
- Amanda Fairbank-Hynes as Becky
- Barnaby Francis as Edward Bagley

== Awards and nominations ==
At the 23rd Young Artist Awards, held in April 2002 in Studio City, California, both Matt Adams and Kelly Salmon were nominated for their roles. At the ceremony, the series was counted as an American production, and the nominations were received on behalf of Noggin.

Ceremony	Award	Nominee	Result
23rd Young Artist Awards	Best Performance in a TV Comedy Series: Supporting Young Actor	Matt Adams	Nominated
23rd Young Artist Awards	Best Performance in a TV Comedy Series: Supporting Young Actress	Kelly Salmon	Nominated
