= Sir Gadabout: The Worst Knight in the Land =

- Genre: Children's television series; Comedy; Family
- Based on: Sir Gadabout by Martyn Beardsley
- Written by: Lenny Barker; John Brennan; Nathan Cockerill; Ian Emes; Lucy Goodman; Steve Jeanes; Rupert Jones; Paul McKenzie; Jim Shields; Alex Williams
- Directed by: Angelo Abela; Ian Emes; Rupert Jones; Jim Shields; Nick Wood
- Presented by: Alibi Productions
- Starring: Jason Thorpe; Kim Wall; Vincent Franklin; Gillian Wright; Tamsin Egerton; Will Theakston; Asier Newman; Ian Lindsay; Damien Goodwin; Don Klass; Dickon Tolson; Joseph Mawle; Richard James
- Theme music composer: Mark Dyson
- Country of origin: United Kingdom
- Original language: English
- No. of seasons: 2
- No. of episodes: 20

Production
- Executive producers: Linda James; Roger Holmes
- Producer: Lucy Goodman
- Cinematography: Alan Wright
- Editors: Matthew Tabern; Liz Webber
- Running time: 24 minutes
- Production company: Alibi Productions

Original release
- Network: ITV (CITV)
- Release: 11 February 2002 – 9 May 2003

Sir Gadabout: The Worst Knight In The Land is a British children's comedy television programme, broadcast on CITV. It originally aired between 11 February 2002 and 9 May 2003.

== Overview ==
Sir Gadabout was an adaptation of series of books by Martyn Beardsley. The show was produced by Lucy Goodman who co-wrote on some episodes. Lead Director was Ian Emes who also co-wrote and Lead Writer was Alex Williams. The show won a BAFTA at the BAFTA Children's Awards in 2003 in the category "Best Writer", with the award going to head writer Alex Williams.

It was nominated for "Best Drama" at the BAFTA Children's Awards in 2002. and won "Best Children's Programme" at the INDIE Awards 2003.

== Plot ==
In Camelot Sir Gadabout is a nightmare of the Round Table as his devotion to the task of protecting King Arthur is undermined by constant blundering. He is often teased by the other knights, particularly the handsome but irritating Sir Lancelot, who Gadabout and his friends frequently try to get the better of.

At the head of the Round Table is the legendary King Arthur who tolerates Gadabout's blundering as he sympathises with him - he too being a terrible blunderer. His teenage daughter, Princess Elenora, is by far more intelligent and capable than her father. She often aids Gadabout and his squire Will (later Juan) in their adventures.

The kingdom is terrorised by the terrible twosome Sir Rancid and his "Nanny" - a comical version of Sir Mordred and his aunt Morgan le Fay - who are set on destroying Camelot and the Round Table. Their attempts to destroy Camelot are always stopped by the intervention of Gadabout, Will, and the mysterious "Sir Knight". The only one who knows the identity of "Sir Knight" is Merlin, who watches over Camelot in his crystal ball.

== Episodes ==
=== Series 1 ===
- 1. Lead Balloons - Accident prone Sir Gadabout loses his job and the dastardly Nanny is out to replace him as Knight of the Round Table. Nanny, is also unsure of Elenora, whose secret dream to become a knight is about to be realised. It all comes to a head and a battle ensues.
- 2. Halibut in the Stone - When Excalibur the magic sword is stolen, King Arthur banishes Sir Gadabout from Camelot. Without Excalibur, Camelot will crumble and fall. Can Excalibur be rescued in time to save Camelot, and will Sir Gadabout be restored to the Round Table?
- 3. The Strike - Rancid and Nanny incite the Knights of the Round Table to go on strike and Nanny takes over as Queen of Camelot. Can Sir Gadabout restore the King to the throne and banish Nanny back to Castle Rancid for good?
- 4. Love Potion - It is Cupid's Day in Camelot but Nanny's plan to make King Arthur fall in love with her goes horribly wrong. Instead Sir Gadabout falls in love with Nanny, and King Arthur falls in love with his horse! Surely Sir Knight can save the day?
- 5. Chiller - Rancid awakens Chiller, a demon from the Underworld who secretly takes over the body of Elenora. King Arthur's beautiful daughter is now a wicked little minx who can freeze people with her breath. The transformation will be permanent and Elenora will be stuck in the Underworld, unless someone can save her. Can Will do it?
- 6. Ogwozzle - Sir Gadabout accidentally brings the Ogwozzle stick back to life and finds he is inextricably bound to a supernatural imp who is hell-bent on wreaking havoc in Camelot. Can Sir Gadabout outwit the dangerous Ogwozzle and return Camelot to normal?
- 7. Elenora's Betrothal - King Arthur dreams that Elenora will one day run Camelot. He must marry her off to prevent such a terrible thing. Rancid is determined to win her hand and therefore Camelot. Sadly, Will's rescue plan depends on Sir Gadabout winning a duel. Only a miracle can save her.
- 8. Silent Knight - It's the Knight of the Year competition but rancid and Nanny plan to spoil it by stealing the prize money. Their obnoxious young visitor accidentally locks Sir Gadabout in the torture chamber. Will he stop the gruesome twosome making off with the prize money?
- 9. The Ghost - Sir Gadabout sees a ghost but no-one believes him. Is this another plot by Rancid and Nanny to scare the Knights right out of Camelot? Or will the ghost scare Rancid and Nanny out of their wits?
- 10. A Fishy Tale - King Marcel, from the magnificent kingdom of Avalon, is choosing a town to twin with. Camelot would be in with a chance were it not for an unfortunate halibut infestation; King Marcel has an irrational fear of.

=== Series 2 ===
- 1. Teddy Ransom
- 2. Decoy
- 3. The King and Irene
- 4. For Batter or for Worse
- 5. Sir Badabout
- 6. Five Knights and a Baby - King Arthur is turned into a baby by Nanny resulting in Sir Gadabout, Sir Prano, Sir Prise, Sir Tificate and Sir Real having to look after him. Meanwhile, Elenora goes to Merlin to convince him to use magic to turn him back.
- 7. Interview with an Umpire - Sir Rancid injects cricket bats with vampire serum and unleashes them on Camelot.
- 8. Knight Fever
- 9. Wild Nights
- 10. Amateur Knights - Elenora's identity is at risk of being revealed when the knights put on a play on the life of Sir Knight, only for Rancid and Nanny to launch another attack. Will the truth of Sir Knight come out?

== Characters ==
=== Main characters ===
- Sir Gadabout - The worst knight in the land. He's a good man – but clumsy, and not very bright. He's rubbish with a sword, and bravely blunders from calamity to crisis via catastrophe. He shares a rivalry with the big-headed Sir Lancelot, whom he often tries to get the better of. Played by Jason Thorpe.
- King Arthur - The ruler of Camelot. He is an eccentric king who rarely sees his two enemies Sir Rancid and Nanny coming. Nonetheless he is well-meaning and kind as he tolerates Gadabout because he feels sorry for him. He underestimates his daughter Elenora despite the fact she is more than capable of looking after herself. He is occasionally seen with a teddy bear. Played by Kim Wall.
- Sir Rancid and Nanny - The main antagonists and enemies of King Arthur. They both live in a dark gloomy briar, in a claw-shaped castle. They are a somewhat gruesome twosome who scheme and dream of Camelot’s downfall. They are a comic version of Morgana and Mordred in the Arthurian legend. Played by Vincent Franklin and Gillian Wright.
- Princess Elenora/Sir Knight - Arthur's beautiful and tomboyish daughter. Elenora wishes to be a knight herself but is underestimated by her father. Ironically, she often finds herself being the one to protect her father from Rancid and Nanny. When trouble strikes, she secretly dons a mysterious silver suit of armour and appears as the enigmatic Sir Knight. Only Merlin knows that Elenora is really Sir Knight. Played by Tamsin Egerton.
- Master Will Watford - Originally Gadabout's squaire and Elenora's best friend who dreams of becoming a knight one day. He develops a friendship with Elenora's alter-ego "Sir Knight" and frequently helps him save Arthur, Gadabout and the other knights. Elenora becomes smitten with him but is unable to tell him that it is her as the identity of "Sir Knight" is a closely guarded secret. Played by Will Theakston.
- Juan de Frisco - Gadabout's squaire in the second series. Hailing from Spain, he and Elenora at first share an initial rivalry as she misses Will. Elenora disputes everything Juan says. He greatly admires "Sir Knight" and, like Will before him, is unaware it is Elenora's alter-ego. Played by Asier Newman.
- Merlin - The magician of Camelot. He has sworn never to practice magic again after a terrible accident and reckoning science is safer. Merlin is obsessed by discovering the secret of man-powered flight but his outlandish flying machines invariably get no further than Camelot’s moat. He has a magic ball that tells him what is going on in the kingdom. He is the only one who knows Elenora is "Sir Knight" and acts as her tutor. Played by Ian Lindsay.
- "Sir Knight" - The mysterious knight who turns up when trouble breaks out. The identity of Sir Knight is a closely guarded secret and no one other than Merlin is aware that he or she is actually Princess Elenora. Sir Knight has many admirers including Will and Juan. According to Merlin, the previous "Sir Knight" was Elenora's late mother, Guinevere. The persona of Sir Knight appears to be one that has been passed down the female line of the family as in one episode the knights put on a show of Sir Knight's "life", which features Arthur's parents and it is suggested that Arthur's mother was also a "Sir Knight" too.

=== The Knights of the Round Table ===
At the beginning of every episode, Arthur addresses each of his knights by name individually:

- Sir Lancelot – The pompous and "bravest" knight in the land, he is actually very shallow and something of a coward. He often makes fun of Gadabout although, in the end, Gadabout gets the last laugh. Played by Damien Goodwin.
- Sir Prise The Japanese foreign exchange knight who is a martial arts expert. He often jumps out of nowhere unexpectedly, scaring the other knights. His name is a play on the word "surprise". Played by Don Klass.
- Sir Prano/Sir Real (Dickon Tolson) Two twin knights; Sir Prano speaks with a high-pitched voice and Sir Real often makes bizarre observations and suggestions during the knights' plans. Sir Real has a Salvador Dalí style moustache, and the coat of arms on his shield is a fish. Their names play on the words "soprano" and "surreal".
- Sir Tificate (Joseph Mawle). His name is a play on "certificate".
- Sir Gestion (Richard James) An extremely well-spoken knight with an odd wit. His name is a play on "suggestion".

== Repeats ==
In 2007, the show was repeated for the first time on the CITV channel since 2003. It was repeated for a one-off repeat one day in the Easter holidays (as an 'Easter Surprise!'). Then in the summer holidays from late July to the end of August. Over a year later in December 2008, it was repeated again throughout the Christmas holidays till January 2009 and again from August 2009 to September 4, 2009, when it last aired.
