= Tamsin Egerton =

British actress (born 1988)

- Born: Tamsin Olivia Egerton-Dick; 26 November 1988 (age 37); Surrey, England
- Occupation: Actress
- Years active: 2001–2019, 2024–present
- Spouse: Josh Hartnett (m. 2021)
- Children: 4

Tamsin Olivia Egerton-Dick (born 26 November 1988) is an English actress. She is known for her roles as Chelsea Parker in the 2007 film St Trinian's, Holly Goodfellow in the 2005 film Keeping Mum and Guinevere in the 2011 television series Camelot, one of three different roles she played in TV series connected with Arthurian legends.

== Early life ==
Egerton was born on 26 November 1988 in Surrey, to Michael Dick and his wife Nicola Egerton. Her father is a businessman. She began her acting career at age 6, following her older half-sister in a local youth theatre. Egerton attended the independent Ditcham Park School near Petersfield in Hampshire.

== Career ==
In 2001, Egerton began acting professionally when she played Mary Lennox in a Royal Shakespeare Company musical production of The Secret Garden, and appeared as young Morgaine in the television miniseries The Mists of Avalon. She soon chose to shorten her surname to Egerton. The following year she played Princess Elenora in the children's television series Sir Gadabout: The Worst Knight in the Land.

Egerton's film debut was as Holly Goodfellow, a precocious vicar's daughter in the black comedy Keeping Mum (2005). Her breakthrough role was as Chelsea, a member of a posh clique in St. Trinian's (2007). She reprised the role in its sequel St Trinian's II: The Legend of Fritton's Gold in 2009. Two years later, she starred in Chalet Girl with Felicity Jones, Ed Westwick, and Bill Nighy. In the same year she portrayed Guinevere in the historical fantasy drama series Camelot. In 2013, Egerton appeared in Michael Winterbottom's biopic The Look of Love which was based on the life of strip-club owner Paul Raymond.

== Personal life ==
Egerton has been in a long-term relationship with American actor Josh Hartnett since 2012. They have a daughter, born in 2015, and three other children born in 2017, 2019, and 2024. They married in November 2021, and live in the Surrey–Sussex border region, in southeast England.

== Filmography ==
=== Film ===
Year	Title	Role	Notes
2005	Keeping Mum	Holly Goodfellow	
2006	Driving Lessons	Sarah	
2006	Eragon	Katrina	Uncredited
2007	St Trinian's	Chelsea Parker	
2009	Knife Edge	Flora	
2009	St Trinian's 2: The Legend of Fritton's Gold	Chelsea Parker	
2010	4.3.2.1.	Cassandra	
2010	Huge	Clarisse	
2010	The Story of F***	Daisy	
2011	Chalet Girl	Georgie	
2013	The Look of Love	Amber St. George / Fiona Richmond	
2013	Justin and the Knights of Valour	Lara (voice)	
2013	Grand Piano	Ashley	
2013	The Lovers	Laura Fennel	
2014	Queen and Country	Ophelia	
2014	Love, Rosie	Sally	
2016	Grimsby	Carla	
2019	Balance, Not Symmetry	Fiona Miller	
2024	Tell That to the Winter Sea	Jade	

=== Television ===
Year	Title	Role	Notes
2001	The Mists of Avalon	Young Morgaine	Miniseries, 2 episodes
2002	Napoléon	Betsy Balcombe	Miniseries, 4 episodes
2002–2003	Sir Gadabout: The Worst Knight in the Land	Princess Elenora / Sir Knight	20 episodes
2003	Hans Christian Andersen: My Life as a Fairytale	Kate Dickens	TV film
2004	Sherlock Holmes and the Case of the Silk Stocking	Miranda Helhoughton	TV film
2006	Mayo	Patti Feathers	Episode: "A Species of Revenge"
2006	Silent Witness	Hannah Duncan	Episodes: "Supernova: Parts 1 & 2"
2007	The Abbey	Tiffany	Unsold TV pilot
2009	Octavia	Octavia Brennan	TV film
2009	Trial & Retribution	Imogen	Episode: "Siren: Part 1"
2010	Money	Butch Beausoleil	Miniseries, 2 episodes
2011	Camelot	Guinevere	Main role
2013	The List	Delilah	TV film
2013	Psychobitches	Nancy Spungen	Episode #1.4
2015	Killing Jesus	Claudia	TV film
