= The Daydreamer (novel) =

1994 children's novel by Ian McEwan

- First edition
- Language: English
- Publisher: Jonathan Cape
- Publication date: 1994
- Publication place: United Kingdom
- Media type: Print
- Pages: 144
- ISBN: 0-224-03671-8

The Daydreamer is a 1994 children's novel by British author Ian McEwan. Illustrated by Anthony Browne. The novel was first published by Jonathan Cape. It draws its plot directly from the Rankin/Bass movie, The Daydreamer (1966) in which a young boy daydreams and enters a world of Hans Christian Andersen stories. It is considered to be McEwan's first book for children, or second if taking into account the picture book Rose Blanche (1985). Critics praised McEwan's imagination, but noted that the book had high "sweetness-and-light levels".

== Synopsis ==
The book comprises seven interlinked stories about a young boy, Peter Fortune, whose daydreams place him into various fantastic situations: he discovers a cream that makes people vanish and makes his family disappear, he conquers a bully on the thought that life was a dream so he had nothing to lose but to wake up, he switches body with his cat and fights off a new tabby stray, he transforms into his baby cousin and experiences the joys of being a toddler, his sister's dolls become alive and attack him, he imagines that the old neighbor becomes a thief and, in the last story, he turns into an adult and discovers that adults' lives are not as boring as he thought. He is 10 years old at the start of the novel and 12 at the end.

== Publication ==
The novel was first published by Jonathan Cape and has been translated into several languages. It has been reprinted by Vintage, amongst others. It is considered to be his first book for children, or second if taking into account the picture book Rose Blanche (1985), both illustrated by Anthony Browne.

McEwan read the stories to his children as he wrote them. In an interview he compared his child self to Peter, saying he was "quiet, pale, dreamy" and was someone who preferred having close friends.

== Analysis ==
Eva Maria Mauter in her 2006 MA thesis Subjective Perspectives in Ian McEwan's Narrations writes that The Daydreamer gets neglected in treatment about McEwan's works because it is a children's novel.

David Malcolm in Understanding Ian McEwan (2002) writes that in the novel Peter, in his unconstrained world, moves between ordinary and impossibly fantastic situations. He compares it to First Love, Last Rites (1975), McEwan's first collection of short stories, because they both contain exciting, frightening, and loose worlds.

== Reception ==
American novelist David Leavitt in The New York Times praises McEwan's imagination, but writes that "fantastic passages" are infrequent and a larger portion is devoted to charting the "everyday calamities of Peter's suburban life", that the staples of the genre "get dutifully dragged out for a rehash." He opines that like most authors of adult fiction who then went on to write children's books, McEwan has a tendency to talk down to the reader. Ending the review, Leavitt concluded that McEwan is at his best when he simply writes, not when he is "writing for children". Paul Taylor writes in The Independent that McEwan, whose early novels concerned "dark and deviant" material, was "too strenuously engaged in keeping the sweetness-and-light levels high". Robert Winder in the New Statesman calls the novel a "lovely children's book ... which captures the gulfs between children and grown-ups more vividly than he does [in Atonement]". Tom Shone in The New York Times writes that the book "had a nice Roald Dahl-like streak of malice to it".

The book was marketed as an adult book in Italy, where it sold well; in 1998 it was released as an adult book in Britain and in North America. .

literacymatters.com includes the book as part of a lesson plan for primary school teachers.

The book was adapted for BBC Radio by Ivan Jones in 2008.
