= The Ghost Hunter (TV series) =

- Genre: Fantasy; Drama; Children's television series
- Based on: The Ghost Hunter series by Ivan Jones
- Written by: Ivan Jones; Jim Eldridge; Roy Apps
- Directed by: David Bell
- Starring: Jean Marsh; William Theakston; Lee Godwin; Verity-Jane Dearsley; Tracy Brabin; John McAndrew
- Composers: David Chilton; Nick Russell-Pavier
- Country of origin: United Kingdom
- Original language: English
- No. of series: 3
- No. of episodes: 18

Production
- Executive producer: Peter Murphy
- Producer: David Bell
- Cinematography: Mike Thomson; Chris Goodger
- Production company: Zenith North

Original release
- Network: BBC One
- Release: 4 January 2000 – 18 February 2002

The Ghost Hunter is a British children's drama series created for the BBC and based on The Ghost Hunter series of novels by Ivan Jones. The series was first broadcast in January 2000 for three seasons, ending in 2002. Repeats continue to be shown on BBC and CBBC as well as in other countries. The first and second series were later reworked into two ninety-minute films.

School location scenes from each of the three series were filmed at St. Laurence School in Bradford on Avon, Wiltshire. Many of the castle scenes were filmed at Berkeley Castle in the Cotswolds.

The Ghost Hunter series revolves around Roddy and Tessa Oliver, two ordinary children whose lives are turned upside down when William Povey, a shoeshine boy from the Victorian era appears in Roddy's bedroom as a ghost and appeals to him for help. The Ghost Hunter is searching for William in order to obtain 'spectral energy' which is only obtainable from capturing ghosts.

At first she seems concerned only to "collect" ghosts, but later her intentions become clear. She wants to use their energy to pass through Time itself and thereby have everlasting life. William's energy is especially high which makes him more attractive to the Ghost Hunter. As Roddy has second sight (the ability to see ghosts) and is the only person initially who can see William, he is the only person who can help him escape. Later, Roddy's sister Tessa also finds she has second sight and can also see William. In their on-going battles, the two boys and Tessa become firm friends and have many adventures together.

Although the series was a ground-breaking one for children's television and influenced other series which followed it, and although it had very high ratings, a fourth series was never commissioned.

== Characters ==
- Roddy Oliver, played by William Theakston – William's friend who has the ability to see and hear ghosts which is known as 'second sight'.
- Tessa Oliver, played by Verity-Jane Dearsley – Roddy's sister, also has 'second sight'
- William Povey, played by Lee Godwin – the main protagonist, a shoeshine boy from the Victorian era who died and lived on as a ghost.
- Elliot Town, played by Jack Quarmby – Roddy's best mate from the year 2027
- Mrs Croker, 'The Ghost Hunter', played by Jean Marsh – the titular antagonist, who detests ghosts and who is willing to do anything to avoid death.
- Clarence DeSniff, played by Richard Hanson – the Ghost Hunter's assistant
- Murdoch, played by Glyn Angell – the keeper of Newgate Prison.
- Mr Oliver & Mrs Oliver, played by John McAndrew and Tracy Brabin – Roddy and Tessa's parents
- Leo, played by Eddie Brown – Roddy's son from the year 2027 who inherits his father's ability to see ghosts.
- Bex, played by Kelly Salmon – Roddy's daughter from the year 2027 who also inherits her father's ability to see ghosts.
- Professor Darcy, played by Andrew Havill – Victorian inventor who begins working with the Ghost Hunter in series 3.

== Plot ==
=== Series One ===
The main action takes place in Roddy and Tessa's village and school where the Ghost Hunter is active. One of the Ghost Hunter's chief abilities is her sense of smell. She can sniff out a ghost effortlessly. Roddy and Tessa do not know who the Ghost Hunter is. They set about trying to discover this so they can protect William. One of their ruses is to put garlic all round Roddy's bedroom, where the ghost is hiding, as the smell is said to keep ghosts and evil away. Eventually, the children realise that the Ghost Hunter is Mrs Croker, but only when she arrives at Roddy's house with her "ghost immobilising vapour" (GIV) with which she tries to freeze William, shrink him and put him in a bottle. Thanks to Roddy's quick wittedness, William escapes and the police almost arrest Mrs Croker but she escapes. Mrs Croker is also, and always, on the look out for other ghosts. She has a whole collection of bottled ghosts that is discovered by Roddy, William and Tessa when the two boys save Tessa, after she is kidnapped by Mrs Croker's side-kick DeSniff and left tied up and gagged in a secret hideout while Mrs Croker and DeSniff go back to the house to look for William. When she learns that there is to be an AGM (Annual Ghost Meeting) at Chillwood Castle, she and DeSniff set up a powerful plan to bottle dozens of ghosts. Her plan is to use ghost-energy for her own wicked purposes, but the plan fails when she attacks the ghosts during a unique ghost celebration that allows them to assume their human bodies once again. Thanks to Roddy, Tessa and William, Mrs Croker falls from the battlements of Chillwood Castle, and is believed to have been killed. DeSniff escapes.

=== Series Two ===
The tone changes and becomes more sinister. DeSniff has discovered Mrs Croker is not dead. She has survived her fall from the castle and returns to work in a strange old mansion, called Deadlock Hall. Here, her demonic energy kicks into action again and she creates a machine called a "specktrika" which pulls ghosts towards it like a magnet. With this she intends to catch enough ghosts to power her "time travelling machine". But by now the eccentric and foolish DeSniff has tasted power and he wants to time travel too. The Ghost Hunter manages to create a time hole in the fabric of the universe and both DeSniff and Mrs Croker are carried back to Victorian times.

=== Series Three ===
Mrs Croker teams up with a Victorian scientist, Mr Darcy. They develop an elaborate plan together to catch masses of ghosts. Mrs Croker wants to use the ghost-energy so that she can become immortal. Returning to the modern era, 25 years have now passed since Roddy and Tessa last defeated Croker, and Roddy is a doctor with two children who are called Leo and Bex. Roddy is nervous when they question him about his old stories of the Ghost Hunter and William. William meets Roddy again, but Roddy can no longer see him, due to the loss of his second sight.

Using the time portal, Mrs Croker and Mr Darcy make millions of pounds, and plan to buy Roddy's former school, and set up "The Ghost School", which is now derelict and abandoned, apart from the ghosts who reside there. The year in the future is 2027.

Bex and Leo, having gone through the time portal to 1890, help a Victorian baby (Albert Povey) who is seriously ill, by bringing him back to 2027. Their father, Dr Roddy, gives the baby antibiotics which saves its life, but by doing so, changes the course of history. Albert grows up to be a successful doctor and in the future, is widely celebrated. Meanwhile, an angry DeSniff thwarts Mrs Croker's plans by withdrawing all of the money Mrs Croker and Mr Darcy have saved. A final showdown between the pair sees DeSniff donating all of the money to the charity which has been set up and is celebrating Albert Povey Day.

Bex and Leo, back in Victorian times, where they have returned the baby Albert to its parents, get back to the Time Portal, only to find it is closed. William and his friends risk sacrificing themselves in order to re-open the portal. Bex and Leo return to the future and in doing so, the time portal closes, perhaps forever. Arriving at the place where the derelict school and The Ghost School had once stood, they see it is now a new hospital, dedicated to Albert Povey. Roddy comes out and tells them they are just in time to see a new ward opening up in honour of the man who donated so much to help ... the DeSniff Ward. Back in Victorian times, two of the ghosts have emerged unscathed from the time machine, but William is nowhere to be seen. Roddy is seen in his office, where William makes his final goodbyes to him. Roddy is delighted he had the chance to see his friend one last time.
