= Out of Bounds (2003 film) =

- Directed by: Merlin Ward
- Written by: Merlin Ward
- Produced by: Michael Lionello Cowan; Jason Piette
- Starring: Sophia Myles; Sophie Ward; George Asprey; Michael Elphick; Julia Barrie; Celia Imrie
- Edited by: PJ Harling
- Music by: Mark Ryder
- Release date: 31 October 2003
- Running time: 90 minutes
- Country: United Kingdom
- Language: English

Out of Bounds, also known as Dead in the Water, is a 2003 British psychological thriller film starring Sophia Myles, Celia Imrie and Sophie Ward. It is the directorial debut of Merlin Ward, who also wrote the screenplay.

== Plot ==
18-year-old Louise (Myles) is stuck in a run-down girls' boarding school and can't bear the thought of being away from her lover, art teacher Matthew (Asprey), during the half term break. So she stays on at school, ostensibly to do extra work for her exams. But when Matthew's wife, Veronica (Ward), who is also the school's headmistress, finds out about the affair, she is driven over the edge and stabs him. Veronica gets rid of Louise by sending her off on an errand while she hides Matthew's body. When Louise returns, she is shocked to find Matthew gone. According to Veronica, she and Matthew need a little time apart to heal their marriage. Trapped in the remote school and haunted by nightmares, Louise finds the vast Victorian building a spooky shell without the other pupils. Late one night, she is awakened by Matthew calling up to her from outside her bedroom window. Scared and excited, Louise rushes to meet him, but it is only as his arms encircle her that she realises her eyes were deceived, with terrible consequences.

== Cast ==
- Sophia Myles as Louise Thompson
- Sophie Ward as Veronica Van Huet
- George Asprey as Matthew Van Huet
- Michael Elphick as Lionel Stubbs
- Julia Barrie as Isabelle Benallack
- Celia Imrie as Doctor Imogen Reed
- Richard Huw as David Benallack
- Chris Humphreys as Detective Inspector Amer
- Kelly Salmon as Phoebe Benallack
