= Uncle Jack =

- Written by: Jim Eldridge
- Starring: Paul Jones; Fenella Fielding; Vivian Pickles; Tricia George; Roger Hammond; Sarah Lambert; Giuseppe Peluso; Catherine Lohr; Brian Capron; Jimmi Harkishin
- Country of origin: United Kingdom
- Original language: English
- No. of series: 4
- No. of episodes: 24

Production
- Running time: 25 minutes

Original release
- Network: BBC1
- Release: 4 October 1990 – 4 November 1993

Uncle Jack was a children's TV show which aired on BBC1 in the early 1990s.

The plot centres around Jack Green, an environmentalist and undercover agent for MI5, who with his family are on a mission to save the planet. Jack's archenemy was a criminal known only as "the Vixen" who would come up with diabolical schemes to rule the world.

== Cast ==
- Jack Green (Paul Jones) – A keen environmentalist and a brilliant undercover agent for MI5. His curiosity and strange methods of work sometimes get him into trouble.
- The Vixen (Fenella Fielding) – Jack's archenemy, a glamorous and notorious international crook whose sole purpose is to rule the world and steal wealth for herself.
- Kate Stevens (Sarah Lambert) – Jack's niece and Michael's younger sister who admires her uncle's work.
- Michael Stevens (Giuseppe Peluso) – Jack's nephew and Kate's elder brother who considers his uncle embarrassing at first but eventually warmed up to him.
- Elizabeth Stevens (Christine Lohr) – Jack's sister and Kate and Michael's mother who loves her brother, but sometimes finds him embarrassing and doesn't always like his methods of work getting the family into trouble.
- Edward Stevens (Brian Capron) – Elizabeth's husband and Kate and Michael's father. He is a bit more tolerant towards Jack's strange methods of work.
- Cynthia Birdwood (Vivian Pickles) – Jack's friend and a very clever but eccentric scientist who helps him on his missions.
- Dorothy Evans/Greckle (Tricia George) – The brilliant but sometimes dimwitted agent 7 of MI5.
- M (Roger Hammond) – The strong but narrow minded head of MI5.
- Jose Cuervo (Jimmi Harkishin) – A villain who often hires the Vixen for her criminal services.
- Kevin (Ross Coumbe) - Nephew of the Head Mistress.
- Helen Brimley (Catherine Bailey) – Another of Jack's nieces who accompanies him on a dig to Egypt. (This was Bailey's screen debut. Also, despite IMDB listing her character's surname as Green, it clearly states in the programme her surname is Brimley).

== Episodes ==
Uncle Jack ran for four series with four six part episodes with each having an environmental message:

=== Series 1 (1990) ===
Uncle Jack and Operation Green

Episodes:

1. How it all Began..
2. The Plot Thickens
3. Carrying the Can
4. Oil
5. Kidnapped
6. All Tied Up

Uncle Jack accidentally gets hold of a formula for a lethal new gas being developed by the GasChem company, but MI5, the Russians and the Americans are after it and all request help from the World's smartest criminal, known only as the Vixen, who has her own sinister scheme of getting the formula for herself.

=== Series 2 (1991) ===
Uncle Jack and the Loch Noch Monster

Episodes:

1. Sinister Happenings...
2. The Return of the Vixen
3. Operation Rescue
4. Terror In Edinburgh
5. Monsters Galore!
6. Countdown

Uncle Jack and his sister's family visit his cousin and his daughter, Tammy, in Scotland only to find that he has disappeared since he went fishing in his boat at Loch Noch and Tammy has been left at home on her own. Jack discovers that the marine base at the Loch is hiding something after also seeing a radioactive material that keeps appearing everywhere that ties in with the mystery of his cousin's disappearance. Meanwhile, the Vixen is up to her old tricks again and wants to use the radioactive material to terrorize the world.

=== Series 3 (1992) ===
Uncle Jack and the Dark Side of the Moon

Episodes:

1. Evil Weather
2. Kidnapped
3. The Vixen Strikes
4. Escape
5. The Vixen Has Landed
6. Off With His Head

When Uncle Jack visits Kate at her new school, he discovers the weather around Brimley Crompton is changing from one extreme to another with heat waves, sudden blustery winds and rain, as if someone is controlling the weather. That someone just happens to be the Vixen from her base on the moon using a standing stone in the school grounds with the help of the school headmistress, Miss Bones and her brother.

=== Series 4 (1993) ===
Uncle Jack and Cleopatra's Mummy

Episodes:

1. A Dig At El Ninny
2. The Camel's Breath
3. Meet The Mummy
4. The Legend Comes Alive
5. The Tomb Of El Wadi Whant
6. The Treasure Of Cleopatra!

Uncle Jack travels to Egypt with his niece Helen to find the lost treasure of Queen Cleopatra, but a mummy seems to be guarding it. The Vixen also wants the treasure and is determined to get to it first by any means necessary without anyone stopping her.
