= Gordon Langford =

Background information
- Born: 11 May 1930; Edgware, Middlesex
- Died: 18 April 2017 (aged 86)
- Occupation: Composer

Gordon Langford (11 May 1930 – 18 April 2017) was an English composer, arranger and performer. He is well known for his brass band compositions and arrangements. He was also a composer of choral and orchestral music, winning an Ivor Novello award for best light music composition for his March from the Colour Suite in 1971.

== Biography ==
Langford was born in Edgware, Middlesex in May 1930 as Gordon Maris Colman. His father was a precision toolmaker. He was a prodigious child, beginning piano lessons aged five. At nine, one of his compositions received a public performance. He attended Bedford Modern School, and he went on to win a scholarship to the Royal Academy of Music where he studied piano and composition with Norman Demuth. It was Demuth who suggested that he should change his surname or use a pseudonym. Hence, he changed his name to become Gordon Colman Langford.

In 1951, during his army service with the Royal Artillery Band, he made his first BBC broadcast as a solo pianist. After leaving the army, he worked with seaside orchestras, a touring opera company and as a ship's musician, but it was during the 1960s he came to prominence as a pianist, arranger and composer on BBC programmes such as Music in the Air, Melody around the World and Ronnie Barker's Lines From My Grandfather's Forehead. In later life he lived in East Devon, mainly composing but occasionally appearing in recordings, concerts and broadcasts.

In 2011 he was nominated for a Fellowship of the Royal Academy of Music (FRAM) by the Governing Body of the Academy. He died in April 2017.

== Works ==
Langford won an Ivor Novello Award for best light music composition for his March from the Colour Suite in 1971. He is perhaps best known as a brass band composer and arranger. In particular, the test pieces Facets of Glass and Rhapsody for trombone are well known. The Black Dyke Band issued a CD of his music in 1976, including the Rhapsody with Don Lusher as soloist. He also arranged the works of other composers, such as Henry Mancini, Jerry Goldsmith and John Williams.

Langford's career had a notable relationship with the BBC. Some of his compositions and arrangements were used as Test Card music in the 1960s and '70s, with such titles as Hebridean Hoedown, The Lark in the Clear Air and Royal Daffodil being remembered by Test Card aficionados. He also wrote and arranged music for Friday Night is Music Night, as well as numerous other BBC programmes. In 1994 the BBC commissioned his piece Grand Fantasia on La bohème for the centenary of the Proms.

Langford produced many choral arrangements for the King's Singers in the 1970s. He was also known for his theatre compositions, such as The Crooked Mile and The House of Cards. Langford was often used by Hollywood as a score orchestrator, with Return of the Jedi, Superman II, The First Great Train Robbery, Clash of the Titans and Return to Oz to his name.

In 1974 he released a demo album entitled The Amazing Music of the Electronic ARP Synthesizer. This contained several compositions of his own, plus cover versions, played entirely on the then new innovation, the ARP synth, of pieces as diverse as "Yellow Submarine", "Raindrops Keep Fallin' on My Head", "Cocktails for Two", "Light Cavalry Overture" and Mozart's Symphony No. 40.

A CD of his original compositions for orchestra, performed by the BBC Concert Orchestra conducted by Rumon Gamba, was released in 2003. Included are the Concertino for Trumpet and Orchestra (1979), Four Movements for String Orchestra (1965), the First Suite of Dances (1973), and two movements from the Colour Suite (1966). Later compositions include his Berceuse and Burlesque for bassoon and orchestra, performed on 1 February 2008 at Axminster.

=== Selected compositions ===
Orchestral

- Beautiful Haven (for Frank Chacksfield, 1986)
- Capriciello for string orchestra
- Chanson d'été (196^)
- A Christmas Fantasy
- Cirrus, rhapsody for piano and orchestra (1966)
- Colour Suite (1966)
- Comedietta, overture
- Concertino for trumpet and orchestra (1979)
- First Suite of Dances (1973)
- Four Movements for string orchestra (1965)
- Friendly Street (1966)
- Grand Fantasia on La bohème (1994)
- Greenways (1966)
- Hebridean Hoedown (1966)
- Hippodrome Waltz (1988)
- Royal Daffodil (1966)
- Song for All Seasons: a fantasie for piano and orchestra (1997)
- Spirit of London, overture (1965)
- Theme and Diversions for accordion and orchestra

Brass band and concert band

- Carnival Day March
- Facets of Glass
- Harmonious Variations on a Theme of Handel (1978)
- Leviathan March
- London Miniature
- Metropolis, overture
- The Peacemakers
- Prince of Wales March
- Proclamation, for bass trombone and brass band
- Rhapsody, for cornet and brass band
- Rhapsody, for trombone and brass band
- Sinfonietta (1975)
- A Summer Scherzo
- Three Haworth Impressions For Brass Band

Chamber

- Andante and Rondo on Flemish Themes for chamber ensemble
- Ballade for violin and piano
- Divertimento for saxophone quartet
- Sonatina for violin and piano
