= Time Riders (TV series) =

- Created by: Jim Eldridge
- Directed by: Michael Winterbottom
- Country of origin: United Kingdom
- Original language: English
- No. of series: 1
- No. of episodes: 4

Production
- Producer: Alan Horrox
- Running time: 22 minutes
- Production company: Thames Television

Original release
- Network: ITV (CITV)
- Release: 16 October – 6 November 1991

Time Riders is a 4-part 1991 CITV show directed by Michael Winterbottom and starring Haydn Gwynne as Dr. B. B. Miller, a motorbike riding time traveler.

Location filming was carried out at the Polytechnic of Wales for scenes set in the modern day (Part One and the end of Part Four), whilst those set in the past (Parts Two, Three and the bulk of Part Four) occurred at Chepstow Castle.

A novelisation of the series written by Eldridge (ISBN 0-09-993940-1) was published in 1991. It was illustrated by Mark Robertson.

== Cast ==
- Haydn Gwynne as Dr. B. B. Miller
- Kenneth Hall as Ben
- Ian McNeice as Leather Hardbones
- Paul Bown as Captain
- Clive Merrison as Professor Crow
- Kerry Shale as Hepworth
- Julie T. Wallace as Lady Chalmerston
- James Saxon as Lord Chalmerston

== Episode list ==
No.	Title	Directed by	Written by	Original release date
1	"Part One"	Michael Winterbottom	Jim Eldridge	16 October 1991
After her experimental time machine accidentally retrieves Ben Hardy from 1832, Dr BB Miller must prevent him from being captured by the unscrupulous Professor Crow. They are eventually forced to flee into the past to escape.
2	"Part Two"	Michael Winterbottom	Jim Eldridge	23 October 1991
BB and Ben land amidst a battle of the English Civil War. After being held prisoner by the Roundheads, they manage to escape, but end up taking a plunge off the top of the castle walls.
3	"Part Three"	Michael Winterbottom	Jim Eldridge	30 October 1991
BB and Ben gain sanctuary with some Royalists, only to find that they are no less dangerous.
4	"Part Four"	Michael Winterbottom	Jim Eldridge	6 November 1991
Having been recaptured by the Roundheads, BB and Ben incite the suspicions of a witchfinder. They eventually manage to escape and return to the 20th Century, arriving before they originally left. It is implied that BB adopts Ben.
