= Roy Apps =

British screenwriter, dramatist, children's author

- Born: 1951 (age 74–75)
- Occupations: Author; Dramatist; Screenwriter
- Known for: BAFTA for outstanding contributions to children’s film and television

Roy Apps (born 1951) is a British screenwriter, dramatist and children's author.

In 2001 Roy Apps was awarded a personal BAFTA for outstanding contributions to children's film and television.

For 10 years he wrote for the award-winning CBBC series Byker Grove where his first job was to write out the show's leading characters "PJ and Duncan" played by Ant and Dec. He co-devised and wrote for the award-winning series The Ghost Hunter and has contributed to many other TV series, including Chucklevision, Barmy Aunt Boomerang, Stacey Stone and Casper's Scare School. In 2019 his black comedy Dr Bodkin's Needle, featuring Celia Imrie, was produced by Pier Productions for BBC 1.

He is the author of 98 children's books. In 1991 his novel The Secret Summer of Daniel Lyons won the Writers’ Guild Children's Book Award and was shortlisted for the Whitbread Awards. Of his most recent titles, Charlie - Prince Of Wheels is published by the Oxford University Press and his Sporting Heroes series is published by Franklin Watts.

He has written over a hundred scripts for BBC radio, including Hopping Down in Kent and a dramatisation of Raymond Briggs' Fungus the Bogeyman, both of which won Sony Awards. His most recent radio work includes The Saving of Albert Perks [for Bernard Cribbins] and the five part serial Miss Bessemer Saves the Train [for Dame Penelope Keith] both produced for BBC Radio 4 by Pier Productions.
