= King Street Junior =

Fictional English Junior school teachers drama series

- Genre: Radio comedy
- Running time: 30 minutes
- Country of origin: United Kingdom
- Language: English
- Home station: BBC Radio 4
- Starring: Peter Davison (series 1–2); Karl Howman (series 3–10); James Grout
- Created by: Jim Eldridge
- Written by: Jim Eldridge (66 episodes); Paul Copley (3 episodes); Richard Stoneman (3 eps); Martin Davies (2 episodes); Andy Rashleigh (1 episode); Ivan Shakespeare (1 episode)
- Produced by: John Fawcett Wilson
- Original release: 25 March 1985 – 2 November 1998
- No. of series: 10
- No. of episodes: 76
- Website: King Street Junior at BBC Radio 4 Extra

King Street Junior is a radio comedy which was broadcast on BBC Radio 4 between March 1985 and November 1998. The show ran for ten series and the cast included Peter Davison, James Grout and Karl Howman. The series is written by Jim Eldridge.

Research for the show was done at Newtown Road School in Carlisle.

A continuation series aired in 2002 and was named King Street Junior Revisited.

Episodes closed with a children's choir singing "See the Farmer Sow the Seed," a hymn written by Baptist minister Frederick Arthur Jackson (1867–1942).

== Cast ==
- Peter Davison as Mr. Eric Brown (Series one and two)
- James Grout as Mr. Harry Beeston
- Karl Howman as Mr. Philip Sims (From series three onwards)
- Tom Watson as Mr. Fred Holliday
- Margaret John as Mrs. Dorothy Stone
- Vivienne Martin as Mrs. Lillian Rudd
- Paul Copley as Mr. Geoff Long
- Marlene Sidaway as Miss. Glenda Lewis
- Deirdre Costello as Mrs. Yvonne Patterson

== Episodes ==
=== Series 1 ===
Broadcast in 1985

All episodes written by Jim Eldridge

- The New School Year Starts Here
- Redeployment
- Crime And Punishment
- The Principle of the Thing
- Scale Points
- Language Units
- Christmas at King Street

=== Series 2 ===
Broadcast in 1987

- Priorities
- Dispute
- Barn Dance
- Problem Parents
- The Sound of Music
- Assemblies
- Parents' Evening
- The Outing
- Sports Day
- Breaking Up Is Hard To Do

=== Series 3 ===
Broadcast in 1988. Peter Davison's character is no longer in the show, having taken a position at another school; from here on is Karl Howman as Philip Sims.

- Back To School
- Fireworks
- The Spirit of Christmas
- The History Game
- Pressures
- Facts of Life
- Under Canvas
- The School Fete

=== Series 4 ===
- It's Only Rock'n'Roll
- Closure
- Opting Out
- Fundraising
- Health
- The Succession
- It's Not Cricket
- That Old Time Religion

=== Series 5 ===
Broadcast in 1990

- D-Day Minus One
- Is This A Career I See Before Me?
- Good Times, Bad Times
- Choices
- Bon Voyage
- Work
- The Reunion

=== Series 6 ===
- In Real Terms
- Travellers
- Safety First
- A Good Read
- Emergency
- A Day at the Centre
- Thursday's Child
- The Games Children Play

=== Series 7 ===
Broadcast in 1992

- Back in the Jug Again
- Witch Hunt
- Is There A Father Christmas?
- Fatal Attraction
- Horses For Courses
- Beside The Seaside
- Taking The Rap
- Endings & Beginnings

=== Series 8 ===
Back after a few years in 1995

- Mr Chips – by Paul Copley
- Settling In
- Beginnings & Endings
- Left Out, Roped In
- Confusion – by Richard Stoneman
- Internal Enquiries

=== Series 9 ===
- Responsibilities by Richard Stoneman
- Danger Zone by Jim Eldridge
- A Bridge To Afar by Paul Copley
- Relative Value by Andy Rashleigh
- With Love by Jim Eldridge
- Crossed Lines Richard Stoneman
- Financial Times by Paul Copley
- Gridlocked by Jim Eldridge

=== Series 10 ===
Broadcast in 1998

- Proposals
- The Rivals
- Accusations
- Target Practice
- Incidental Music
- Final Thoughts

== Broadcast History ==
For most of its run, it was broadcast in Radio 4's lunchtime comedy slot at 12.27, with later series moving to a morning broadcast. Repeats have also been aired on BBC Radio 7 and BBC Radio 4 Extra.

== Critical reception ==
The series was described as follows:

"An unassuming Radio 4 institution, this character sitcom-cum-light drama serial followed the working lives of a group of teachers at a small junior school in a multiracial area, and came from the pen of Jim Eldridge, himself a former teacher."

== Multimedia ==
The ten series of the show are published by Penguin and available to purchase at Audible.

== Book ==
Jim Eldridge, who created the show and wrote 87 episodes, also wrote a 2006 book, King Street Junior – The Inside Story, describing the history of the show including the behind-the-scenes conflicts.
