= Good Night, Sleep Tight (anthology) =

Poetry anthology collated by Ivan Jones and Mal Lewis Jones

Good Night, Sleep Tight is a major children's poetry anthology collated by Ivan Jones and Mal Lewis Jones. It contains 366 poems by world famous and lesser known poets, including some of the editors' own poems. There is one poem for each night of the year. The book is divided into twelve sections with each month illustrated by a well-known illustrator. The idea of the book is for busy parents to read their children a poem every night - and to pick out special ones for birthdays, religious festivals and other significant events. The book was published by Scholastic and Scholastic Inc (USA) in 2000 and has sold over a hundred thousand copies in hardback.

The book contains many major poems, including "I Met At Eve" by Walter de la Mare, "Will There Really Be a Morning" by Emily Dickinson, "Last Night I Dreamed about Chickens" by Jack Prelutsky, and "Escape at Bedtime" by Robert Louis Stevenson.
