= Inkshed =

Inkshed (later CASLL, the Canadian Association for the Study of Language and Learning]) was a Canadian organization of teachers and scholars of writing and reading, predominantly in postsecondary institutions. It effectively began in 1982 with the publication of a newsletter, which continued in various forms until 2015. The first national "Inkshed Working Conference" was held in Fredericton, New Brunswick, in August 1984, and annual conferences were held in various Canadian cities until 2015.

The organization's aims, as codified when it was incorporated, in 1994, were "to provide a forum and common context for discussion, collaboration, and reflective inquiry in discourse and pedagogy in the areas of writing, reading (including the reading of literature), rhetoric, and language."

The name "Inkshed" was proposed by co-founder James A. Reither, who found it in the Oxford English Dictionary as a "humorous" word, meaning "the shedding or spilling of ink; consumption or waste of ink in writing." He and Russell A. Hunt, the other co-founder, explained that it was their intention to make "freewriting," a strategy popularized by composition theorist Peter Elbow, into "something dialogically transactional" by embedding the writing into situations, usually in classrooms, where the freewritten texts were immediately read by others, in search of ideas or insights that impromptu writing might generate. The Inkshed conferences used this strategy in various ways over the years, the common thread being that written texts were created and read immediately, and stood in for—and underlay and promoted—some part of the oral discussion that usually characterizes academic gatherings.

== Context ==
Inkshed's origin has been characterized as in part a reaction among Canadian teachers of English to the widespread advent of the (often required) introductory composition course in US universities, and the concomitant growth there of the "comp industry." As more courses were offered, more faculty was hired, more pressure exerted on young faculty to publish, more conferences in which to collaborate and present, more organizations to sponsor such conferences and more journals in which to publish. In Canada such an institution never did develop. At the time of Inkshed's founding, the vast majority of first-year English courses in Canadian universities were identified as introductions to literature, and while it was often tacitly assumed that learning to write was something that such courses would afford, little attention was paid to issues at the forefront of theory and scholarship such as the cognitive processes of composition, and introductory composition courses were rare. Thus, for Inkshed, in contrast to the situation in the U.S., there was no pre-existing constituency of composition teachers and thus no supporting infrastructure. Canadian teachers and scholars who, for whatever reasons, were concerned with the teaching and learning of writing, typically found colleagues and collaborators by attending American conferences and reading American journals.

== History ==
Inkshed began as an occasional newsletter, the W&R/T&P (Writing and Reading, Theory and Practice) Newsletter, circulated by mail to a group of a hundred or so subscribers. Within a year, circulation was over 250, and it was rechristened Inkshed. Eventually there were several hundred subscribers, and issues came out six times during the academic year. The associated online listserv discussion group had accumulated a subscription list in the hundreds, and served as a venue for often intense and extended discussions of contentious issues, some of which were edited and published in the newsletter or online. One, for example, was an extended online conversation about the nature of inkshedding itself, which appeared in reformatted form in the February 1994 issue of the newsletter. The annual conferences, usually in loose association with meetings of CCTE (the Canadian Council of Teachers of English) or the "Learneds" (the annual national meeting of university faculty, since renamed the Congress of the Humanities and Social Sciences) had become an important venue for teachers and theorists to explore at length new ideas about the teaching and learning of literacy at every level.

In 1994 the organization gave rise to a new initiative, Inkshed Publications, which was to become the only academic publisher of peer-reviewed books focused on Canadian writing and teaching studies, publishing eleven books over the next quarter century, the two most recent in 2017.

By the end of the 90s, however, the newsletter was reduced to two or three issues a year, and in 2009 it ceased publication altogether, with an issue featuring two reviews of a book detailing the life and lingering death of a bellwether writing program at a major Canadian university. About the same time, the Canadian Association of Teachers of Technical Writing broadened its focus, transforming itself into the Canadian Association for the Study of Discourse and Writing, and a new association, the Canadian Writing Centre Association, also emerged. This meant there were more outlets for discussion of the place of writing in Canadian universities, and more conferences. Although an online-only version of the newsletter was revived in 2012, participation in online and other discussion of the kind Inkshed had fostered was declining. The CASLL list, like other similar lists, saw less sustained multivoiced discussion and an increasing proportion of institutional announcements. The final issue of Inkshed appeared just before the last conference, in Ottawa, in May 2015. In 2018 the inkshed.ca Web site disappeared, and the remaining archives of the organization moved to the Web site of the Canadian Association for the Study of Discourse and Writing, who had offered to host them.

== Legacy ==
The influence of Inkshed is felt in the continuing, active presence of Inkshed Publications, and as well in the publications and documents of the scholars and teachers involved. The ideas are still regularly revived and explored in new contexts. The larger influence of the organization is found primarily in its role in the paradigm shift which theory and practice of literacy teaching underwent beginning in the 1980s. This shift entailed a new recognition that writing and reading were complex processes which could be more deeply understood, and that the processes were not merely cognitive processes, occurring in isolated minds, but social events, shaped by the circumstances and participants. It has been argued that Inkshed participants like Anthony Paré were at the forefront of this increasing awareness, and that many members of the organization over the years have been instrumental in this process of collaborative discovery. More generally, It has been argued that Inkshed was at the forefront of the movement away from "process-based" models of writing to external, transactive and social ones.
