= Kelly Salmon =

British actress

- Occupation: Actress

Kelly Salmon is an English actress.

== Filmography ==
Television
Year	Title	Role	Notes
1997	Blue Peter	Modelling	
1998	Blue Peter	Duffy	West End Show
1999	Merlin: The Return	Dubbing Co-lead	
2000	The Ghosthunter	Bex	
2000	Big Kids	Kate Spiller	
2000	Big Kids	Herself	Interview
2001	London's Burning	Girl Guide	
2002	The Ghost Hunter	Bex	
2003	Big Kids	Herself - Interview	
2004	The Ghost Hunter	Herself	Interview
Film
Year	Film	Role	Notes
1995	Solitaire for 2	Young Katie in garden	
2003	Out of Bounds	Phoebe Benallack	
