= Poppy Cat =

British children's book series

Poppy Cat is a series of books created by the British illustrator and writer Lara Jones. The books are published by Campbell Books (a division of Macmillan Publishers), and include Poppy Cat's Play House, Poppy Cat's Christmas, Poppy Cat Loves Rainbows, Poppy Cat's Dream, and Poppy Cat's Sparkly Night. The books have been published in many countries and have sold in excess of two million copies.

== TV series ==
An animated TV series based on the Poppy Cat books and comprising 52 episodes running 11 minutes, was created by Mallory Lewis and produced by Coolabi Productions UK, Cake Entertainment, Ingenious Media and BAFTA award-winning King Rollo Films. Poppy Cat herself is voiced in the UK by Joanna Page from BBC's award-winning series Gavin & Stacey (later replaced by Jessica Ransom from Doc Martin) and in the US by Cake Charles. The series was scored by composer Oliver Davis.
