= Will Theakston =

British actor

- Born: 4 October 1984 (age 40); United Kingdom

William Theakston (born 4 October 1984) is an English former actor who appeared in the first Harry Potter film. He played the role of the Slytherin Terrance Higgs, the seeker of the Slytherin Quidditch team. He attended Latymer Upper School.

He has also appeared in two children's TV series: CBBC's The Ghost Hunter and CITV's Sir Gadabout: The Worst Knight in the Land. In Ghost Hunter he played the character of Roddy, one of the main characters. Roddy and his sister Tessa make friends with the ghost of a Victorian shoe-shine boy who is being hunted by the sinister Ghost Hunter. In Sir Gadabout he played the character of Will, a more minor character who is the friend of the princess in the series. This programme was loosely based on the stories of King Arthur.

== Partial filmography ==
- Harry Potter and the Philosopher's Stone (2001) - Terence Higgs
