= List of British films of 2002 =

A list of British films released in 2002.

Title	Director	Cast	Genre	Notes
24 Hour Party People	Michael Winterbottom	Steve Coogan, Shirley Henderson, Paddy Considine, Ralf Little	Comedy/drama	Manchester party culture; entered at Cannes
28 Days Later	Danny Boyle	Cillian Murphy, Naomie Harris, Christopher Eccleston	Horror	
About a Boy	Chris Weitz	Hugh Grant, Nicholas Hoult, Toni Collette	Comedy	
AKA	Duncan Roy	Matthew Leitch, Diana Quick, George Asprey	Drama	Eight awards and nominations
Ali G Indahouse	Mark Mylod	Sacha Baron Cohen, Martin Freeman, Michael Gambon, Charles Dance	Comedy	
All or Nothing	Mike Leigh	Timothy Spall, Sam Kelly		Entered into the 2002 Cannes Film Festival
Anita and Me	Metin Hüseyin	Chandeep Uppal, Kabir Bedi, Anna Brewster	Comedy/drama	British Indian film
Before You Go	Lewis Gilbert	Julie Walters, John Hannah	Comedy	
Bend It Like Beckham	Gurinder Chadha	Parminder Nagra, Keira Knightley, Jonathan Rhys Meyers	Drama/sports	
Deathwatch	Michael J. Bassett	Jamie Bell, Laurence Fox	Horror	
Die Another Day	Lee Tamahori	Pierce Brosnan, Halle Berry, John Cleese, Madonna	Spy/action	Last James Bond film starring Brosnan
Dirty Pretty Things	Stephen Frears	Chiwetel Ejiofor	Drama	
Doctor Sleep (also known as Close Your Eyes)	Nick Willing	Goran Visnjic, Shirley Henderson, Paddy Considine	Drama	
Dog Soldiers	Neil Marshall	Sean Pertwee, Kevin McKidd	Horror	
The Escapist	Gillies MacKinnon	Jonny Lee Miller, Andy Serkis	Thriller	
Extreme Ops	Christian Duguay	Devon Sawa, Bridgette Wilson-Sampras, Rupert Graves, Rufus Sewell	Action/thriller	
The Guru	Daisy von Scherler Mayer	Jimi Mistry, Heather Graham, Marisa Tomei	Comedy	
Harry Potter and the Chamber of Secrets	Chris Columbus	Daniel Radcliffe, Rupert Grint, Emma Watson	Fantasy	
The Honeytrap	Michael G. Gunther	Emily Lloyd, Valerie Edmond, Anthony Green, Ed Harris	Thriller	
The Hours	Stephen Daldry	Nicole Kidman, Meryl Streep, Julianne Moore, Ed Harris	Drama	
The Importance of Being Earnest	Oliver Parker	Rupert Everett, Colin Firth, Judi Dench	Comedy	Adaptation of the play by Oscar Wilde
In This World	Michael Winterbottom	Jamal Udin Torabi, Enayatullah	Drama	
The Last Great Wilderness	David Mackenzie	Alastair Mackenzie, Jonathan Phillips, Ewan Stewart, David Hayman, Victoria Smurfit	Dogme 95-esque thriller/dark humour	
Long Time Dead	Marcus Adams	Joe Absolom, Lukas Haas	Horror	
The Magdalene Sisters	Peter Mullan	Anne-Marie Duff, Nora Jane Noone, Geraldine McEwan	Drama	
Miranda	Marc Munden	Christina Ricci, John Simm	Romance/comedy	
Morvern Callar	Lynne Ramsay	Samantha Morton	Drama	
My Little Eye	Marc Evans	Sean Cw Johnson, Kris Lemche	Horror	
My Wrongs #8245–8249 & 117	Chris Morris	Paddy Considine	Comedy	Short film
Nicholas Nickleby	Douglas McGrath	Charlie Hunnam, Nathan Lane, Jim Broadbent	Comedy drama	
Once Upon a Time in the Midlands	Shane Meadows	Robert Carlyle, Shirley Henderson, Kathy Burke	Crime drama	
The One and Only	Simon Cellan Jones	Justine Waddell, Richard Roxburgh, Jonathan Cake	Comedy/romance	
The Pianist	Roman Polanski	Adrien Brody, Frank Finlay	Drama	
Pure	Gillies MacKinnon	David Wenham, Keira Knightley, Molly Parker	Drama	
The Revenger's Tragedy	Alex Cox	Christopher Eccleston, Eddie Izzard, Derek Jacobi	Drama	Adaptation of the play by Thomas Middleton
Ripley's Game	Liliana Cavani	John Malkovich, Dougray Scott	Crime	Co-production with Italy and the US
Silent Cry	Julian Richards	Emily Woof, Douglas Henshall	Thriller	
Solid Geometry	Denis Lawson	Ewan McGregor, Ruth Millar	Mystery	Short film
The Soul Keeper	Roberto Faenza	Emilia Fox, Iain Glen, Craig Ferguson	Romance/drama	Italian-French-British co-production
Spider	David Cronenberg	Ralph Fiennes, Miranda Richardson, Gabriel Byrne	Psychological thriller	
Tomorrow La Scala!	Francesca Joseph			Screened at the 2002 Cannes Film Festival
Two Men Went to War	John Henderson	Kenneth Cranham, Leo Bill	World War II comedy	
Vacuuming Completely Nude in Paradise	Danny Boyle	Timothy Spall, Michael Begley	Comedy/drama	
The Warrior	Asif Kapadia	Irrfan Khan	Adventure	Made in Hindi

== See also ==
- 2002 in film
- 2002 in British music
- 2002 in British radio
- 2002 in British television
- 2002 in the United Kingdom
- List of 2002 box office number-one films in the United Kingdom
