= List of British films of 2003 =

A list of British films released in 2003.

== 2003 ==
Title	Director	Cast	Genre	Notes
16 Years of Alcohol	Richard Jobson	Kevin McKidd, Iain De Caesteker, Susan Lynch	Drama	
The Actors	Conor McPherson	Michael Caine, Dylan Moran	Comedy/crime	
Anything Else	Woody Allen	Woody Allen, Jason Biggs, Stockard Channing, Danny DeVito, Jimmy Fallon, Christina Ricci	Romantic comedy	
Baltic Storm	Reuben Leder	Greta Scacchi, Jürgen Prochnow	Thriller	Co-production with Germany
Blackball	Mel Smith	Paul Kaye, Alice Evans	Comedy	
Bollywood Queen	Jeremy Wooding	Preeya Kalidas, James McAvoy	Musical	
Bright Young Things	Stephen Fry	Emily Mortimer, Stephen Campbell Moore	Period drama	
Calendar Girls	Nigel Cole	Julie Walters, Helen Mirren	Drama	
Code 46	Michael Winterbottom	Tim Robbins, Samantha Morton	Science fiction	
Cold Mountain	Anthony Minghella	Jude Law, Nicole Kidman, Ray Winstone	War	Co-production with Romania, Italy and the US
Devil's Gate	Stuart St. Paul	Laura Fraser, Callum Blue	Drama	
Festival Express	Bob Smeaton	Janis Joplin, Grateful Dead, The Band	Documentary	
Game Over: Kasparov and the Machine	Vikram Jayanti	Garry Kasparov	Documentary	
Girl with a Pearl Earring	Peter Webber	Colin Firth, Scarlett Johansson, Tom Wilkinson	Drama	
The Gospel of John	Philip Saville	Henry Ian Cusick, Stuart Bunce	Biblical	
The Heart of Me	Thaddeus O'Sullivan	Helena Bonham Carter, Paul Bettany	Period drama	
Hope Springs	Mark Herman	Colin Firth, Minnie Driver	Comedy	
Imagining Argentina	Christopher Hampton	Antonio Banderas, Emma Thompson	Drama	
Imperium: Augustus	Roger Young	Peter O'Toole, Charlotte Rampling	Drama	
Johnny English	Peter Howitt	Rowan Atkinson, John Malkovich	Spy/comedy	
Kiss of Life	Emily Young	Gemma Jones	Drama	Screened at the 2003 Cannes Film Festival
The Last Horror Movie	Julian Richards	Kevin Howarth, Mark Stevenson	Horror	
Love Actually	Richard Curtis	Alan Rickman, Bill Nighy, Emma Thompson, Ant & Dec	Romance	
Matchstick Men	Ridley Scott	Nicolas Cage, Sam Rockwell, Alison Lohman, Bruce McGill	Black comedy	
Monsieur N.	Antoine de Caunes	Philippe Torreton, Richard E. Grant	Historical	Co-production with France
The Mother	Roger Michell	Anne Reid, Peter Vaughan, Daniel Craig	Drama	
Out of Bounds	Merlin Ward	Sophia Myles, Sophie Ward	Thriller	
Owning Mahowny	Richard Kwietniowski	Philip Seymour Hoffman, Minnie Driver, John Hurt	Drama	Co-production with Canada
Peter Pan	P. J. Hogan	Jeremy Sumpter, Jason Isaacs	Family	Co-production with Australia and the United States
The Reckoning	Paul McGuigan	Paul Bettany, Marián Aguilera, Trevor Steedman	Mystery	
Revengers Tragedy	Alex Cox	Christopher Eccleston, Derek Jacobi	Drama	
Seeing Double	Nigel Dick	Tina Barrett, Jon Lee, Bradley McIntosh, Jo O'Meara, Hannah Spearritt, Rachel Stevens	Comedy/drama/musical	
A Short Film About John Bolton	Neil Gaiman	John O'Mahony, Marcus Brigstocke	Mockumentary	
The Statement	Norman Jewison	Michael Caine, Tilda Swinton, Jeremy Northam	Drama	
Sylvia	Christine Jeffs	Gwyneth Paltrow, Daniel Craig	Biopic	
The Tesseract	Oxide Pang	Jonathan Rhys-Meyers, Saskia Reeves	Drama	
This Is Not a Love Song	Bille Eltringham	Michael Colgan, David Bradley, John Henshaw	Thriller	
To Kill a King	Mike Barker	Tim Roth, Dougray Scott	Historical	Entered into the 25th Moscow International Film Festival
Touching the Void	Kevin MacDonald	Brendan Mackey, Nicholas Aaron, Ollie Ryall	Documentary	
Triads, Yardies and Onion Bhajees	Sarjit Bains	Dave Courtney, Manish Patel	Crime/thriller	
The Trouble with Men and Women	Tony Fisher	Joseph McFadden, Kate Ashfield	Drama	
The Tulse Luper Suitcases	Peter Greenaway			Entered into the 2003 Cannes Film Festival
Wondrous Oblivion	Paul Morrison	Sam Smith, Delroy Lindo	Sports	
Young Adam	David Mackenzie	Ewan McGregor, Tilda Swinton, Peter Mullan	Thriller/drama	

== See also ==
- 2003 in film
- 2003 in British music
- 2003 in British radio
- 2003 in British television
- 2003 in the United Kingdom
- List of 2003 box office number-one films in the United Kingdom
