= List of 1990 box office number-one films in the United Kingdom =

This is a list of films which have placed number one at the weekly box office in the United Kingdom during 1990.

== Number one films ==
| † | This implies the highest-grossing movie of the year. |

| # | Week ending | Film | Gross | Notes | Ref |
|---|---|---|---|---|---|
| 1 | 5 January 1990 | Back to the Future Part II | £870,957 | | |
| 2 | 12 January 1990 | When Harry Met Sally... | £940,111 | When Harry Met Sally reached number one in its sixth week of release | |
| 3 | 19 January 1990 | Parenthood | £1,155,153 | | |
| 4 | 26 January 1990 | Parenthood | £1,026,465 | | |
| 5 | 2 February 1990 | Black Rain | £1,044,253 | | |
| 6 | 9 February 1990 | Black Rain | £801,322 | | |
| 7 | 16 February 1990 | Honey, I Shrunk the Kids | £1,750,661 | Honey, I Shrunk the Kids had the biggest opening week for a Disney film | |
| 8 | 23 February 1990 | Honey, I Shrunk the Kids | £3,049,785 | | |
| 9 | 2 March 1990 | Honey, I Shrunk the Kids | £1,655,565 | | |
| 10 | 9 March 1990 | Born on the Fourth of July | £1,153,894 | | |
| 11 | 16 March 1990 | Born on the Fourth of July | £862,042 | | |
| 12 | 23 March 1990 | Born on the Fourth of July | £526,655 | | |
| 13 | 30 March 1990 | The War of the Roses | £1,424,019 | The War of the Roses reached number one in its third week of release | |
| 14 | 6 April 1990 | The War of the Roses | £1,091,348 | | |
| 15 | 11 April 1990 | Look Who's Talking | £1,886,779 | Six days only | |
| 16 | 19 April 1990 | Look Who's Talking | £1,968,369 | | |
| 17 | 26 April 1990 | Look Who's Talking | £1,281,831 | | |
| 18 | 3 May 1990 | The Krays | £1,036,117 | | |
| 19 | 10 May 1990 | The Krays | £691,771 | | |
| 20 | 17 May 1990 | Pretty Woman | £1,351,836 | | |
| 21 | 24 May 1990 | Pretty Woman | £1,259,370 | | |
| 22 | 31 May 1990 | Pretty Woman | £920,097 | | |
| 23 | 7 June 1990 | Pretty Woman | £838,476 | | |
| 24 | 14 June 1990 | Pretty Woman | £822,042 | | |
| 25 | 21 June 1990 | Pretty Woman | £671,228 | | |
| 26 | 28 June 1990 | Pretty Woman | £783,657 | | |
| 27 | 5 July 1990 | Pretty Woman | £682,635 | | |
| 28 | 12 July 1990 | Pretty Woman | £673,517 | | |
| 29 | 19 July 1990 | Back to the Future Part III | £2,227,580 | | |
| 30 | 26 July 1990 | Back to the Future Part III | £1,544,843 | | |
| 31 | 2 August 1990 | Gremlins 2: The New Batch | £2,436,707 | | |
| 32 | 9 August 1990 | Gremlins 2: The New Batch | £1,521,568 | | |
| 33 | 16 August 1990 | Total Recall | £1,931,415 | Total Recall reached number one in its third week of release | |
| 34 | 23 August 1990 | Total Recall | £1,608,429 | | |
| 35 | 30 August 1990 | Die Hard 2 | £1,738,784 | Die Hard 2 reached number one in its second week of release | |
| 36 | 6 September 1990 | Die Hard 2 | £1,294,204 | | |
| 37 | 13 September 1990 | Memphis Belle | £1,174,250 | | |
| 38 | 20 September 1990 | Memphis Belle | £1,080,722 | | |
| 39 | 27 September 1990 | Another 48 Hrs. | £982,527 | | |
| 40 | 4 October 1990 | Presumed Innocent | £1,168,011 | | |
| 41 | 11 October 1990 | Ghost † | £2,677,450 | | |
| 42 | 18 October 1990 | Ghost † | £2,388,613 | | |
| 43 | 25 October 1990 | Ghost † | £2,507,197 | | |
| 44 | 1 November 1990 | Ghost † | £2,224,302 | | |
| 45 | 8 November 1990 | Ghost † | £2,197,639 | | |
| 46 | 15 November 1990 | Ghost † | £1,963,776 | | |
| 47 | 22 November 1990 | Ghost † | £1,672,825 | | |
| 48 | 29 November 1990 | Ghost † | £1,301,821 | | |
| 49 | 6 December 1990 | Teenage Mutant Ninja Turtles | £2,013,665 | Teenage Mutant Ninja Turtles reached number one in its second week of release | |
| 50 | 13 December 1990 | Teenage Mutant Ninja Turtles | £1,131,231 | | |
| 51 | 20 December 1990 | Home Alone | £978,535 | Home Alone reached number one in its second week of release | |
| 52 | 27 December 1990 | Home Alone | £944,656 | | |

== Highest-grossing films ==
Highest-grossing films in the U.K. between 1 December 1989 and 20 December 1990

| Rank | Title | Distributor | Gross (£) |
|---|---|---|---|
| 1. | Ghost | Paramount Pictures/UIP | 19,161,000 |
| 2. | Pretty Woman | Touchstone Pictures/Warner Bros. | 12,068,000 |
| 3. | Look Who's Talking | Columbia Tri-Star | 10,381,000 |
| 4. | Honey, I Shrunk the Kids | Touchstone/Warner Bros. | 9,395,000 |
| 5. | Total Recall | Guild | 8,580,000 |
| 6. | Ghostbusters II | Columbia Tri-Star | 8,491,000 |
| 7. | Back to the Future Part III | Universal Pictures/UIP | 8,007,000 |
| 8. | Back to the Future Part II | Universal/UIP | 7,675,000 (Note: The chart per The Guinness Book of Box Office Hits from Screen International lists Gremlins 2: The New Batch above Back to the Future Part II with the latter having a gross for the period reported by Screen International of £7.2 million) |
| 9. | Gremlins 2: The New Batch | Warner Bros. | 7,419,000 |
| 10. | When Harry Met Sally | Palace Pictures | 7,000,000 |

== See also ==
- List of British films — British films by year
- Lists of box office number-one films

== Chronology ==
| Preceded by 1989 | 1990 | Succeeded by 1991 |
