= List of 1997 box office number-one films in the United Kingdom =

This is a list of films which have placed number one at the weekend box office in the United Kingdom during 1997.

== Number one films ==
†	This implies the highest-grossing movie of the year.

#	Weekend End Date	Film	Box Office	Notes	Ref
1	January 5, 1997	Evita	£2,068,488	Evita reached number one in its third week of release	
2	January 12, 1997	Evita	£1,749,118		
3	January 19, 1997	Evita	£1,412,412		
4	January 26, 1997	Evita	£1,119,052		
5	February 2, 1997	Evita	£838,500		
6	February 9, 1997	Ransom	£3,283,302	Ransom reached number one in its second week of release. The nationwide opening set a record for February	
7	February 16, 1997	Ransom	£2,053,737		
8	February 23, 1997	Ransom	£1,382,489		
9	March 2, 1997	Mars Attacks!	£2,121,878		
10	March 9, 1997	Jerry Maguire	£1,529,748		
11	March 16, 1997	Jerry Maguire	£1,334,625		
12	March 23, 1997	Star Wars (Special Edition)	£3,702,720	The reissue of Star Wars Episode IV: A New Hope had a record opening for March surpassing Toy Story's £3,387,160	
13	March 30, 1997	Star Wars (Special Edition)	£2,406,795		
14	April 6, 1997	Star Wars (Special Edition)	£1,480,940		
15	April 13, 1997	The Empire Strikes Back (Special Edition)	£1,987,161		
16	April 20, 1997	The Empire Strikes Back (Special Edition)	£1,265,879		
17	April 27, 1997	Return of the Jedi (Special Edition)	£1,681,159		
18	May 4, 1997	Liar Liar	£1,969,204		
19	May 11, 1997	Liar Liar	£1,749,272		
20	May 18, 1997	Liar Liar	£1,206,000		
21	May 25, 1997	Liar Liar	£909,257		
22	June 1, 1997	Absolute Power	£472,544	Absolute Power's opening weekend gross included previews of £70,196. Excluding previews, Liar Liar retained the number one spot with a gross of £440,994	
23	June 8, 1997	Con Air	£1,339,155		
24	June 15, 1997	The Fifth Element	£1,483,043	The Fifth Element reached number one in its second week	
25	June 22, 1997	The Fifth Element	£1,193,215		
26	June 29, 1997	Batman & Robin	£4,940,566	Batman & Robin had a record opening for Warner Bros. beating Batman Forever's £4,714,000 and a record opening for June	
27	July 6, 1997	Batman & Robin	£2,214,719		
28	July 13, 1997	Batman & Robin	£1,214,411		
29	July 20, 1997	The Lost World: Jurassic Park	£5,666,917	The Lost World: Jurassic Park had a record opening for United International Pictures and a record opening for July, beating Jurassic Park's £4,875,317	
30	July 27, 1997	The Lost World: Jurassic Park	£3,794,948		
31	August 3, 1997	Men in Black	£7,066,748	Men in Black set the opening weekend record beating Independence Day's £7,005,905	
32	August 10, 1997	Men in Black	£3,388,263		
33	August 17, 1997	Men in Black	£2,547,413		
34	August 24, 1997	Men in Black	£2,438,822		
35	August 31, 1997	Men in Black	£1,720,695		
36	September 7, 1997	The Full Monty †	£1,569,956	The Full Monty reached number one in its second week of release	
37	September 14, 1997	The Full Monty †	£1,839,950		
38	September 21, 1997	The Full Monty †	£1,981,757		
39	September 28, 1997	The Full Monty †	£1,993,426		
40	October 5, 1997	The Full Monty †	£2,123,319		
41	October 12, 1997	The Full Monty †	£1,914,537		
42	October 19, 1997	The Full Monty †	£1,830,228		
43	October 26, 1997	The Full Monty †	£1,722,755		
44	November 2, 1997	The Full Monty †	£1,655,822	The Full Monty becomes the first film to top the box office for nine consecutive weekends	
45	November 9, 1997	Face/Off	£1,601,342		
46	November 16, 1997	The Full Monty †	£1,251,606	The Full Monty returned to number one in its twelfth week of release	
47	November 23, 1997	The Full Monty †	£1,119,520		
48	November 30, 1997	Alien: Resurrection	£2,672,657	Alien: Resurrection set a record opening for November and for an 18-certificate film, the latter beating Bram Stoker's Dracula's £2.64 million.	
49	December 7, 1997	Alien: Resurrection	£1,095,607		
50	December 14, 1997	Tomorrow Never Dies	£3,656,746	Tomorrow Never Dies set a record opening for December beating 101 Dalmatians's £2,360,762	
51	December 21, 1997	Tomorrow Never Dies	TBD		
52	December 28, 1997	Spiceworld	£4,777,124	Spiceworld set a record opening for a British production beating Bean: The Ultimate Disaster Movie's £2,278,390 (excluding previews)	

== Highest-grossing films ==
Highest-grossing films 29 November 1996 to 30 November 1997

Rank	Title	Distributor	Gross
1.	The Full Monty	20th Century Fox	£40,817,733
2.	Men in Black	Columbia TriStar	£35,801,983
3.	The Lost World: Jurassic Park	UIP	£25,799,961
4.	101 Dalmatians	Buena Vista	£20,380,347
5.	Bean	PolyGram	£17,621,882
6.	Star Wars (Special Edition)	20th Century Fox	£16,343,172
7.	Batman & Robin	Warner Bros.	£14,676,429
8.	Evita	Entertainment	£14,218,510
9.	Ransom	Buena Vista	£12,799,311
10.	The English Patient	Buena Vista	£12,554,629

== See also ==
- List of British films — British films by year

== Chronology ==
Preceded by 1996	1997	Succeeded by 1998
