= List of 2001 box office number-one films in the United Kingdom =

This is a list of films which have placed number one at the weekend box office in the United Kingdom during 2001.

== Number-one films ==
†	This implies the highest-grossing movie of the year.

#	Weekend End Date	Film	Box Office	Notes	Refs
1	7 January 2001	Unbreakable	£2,211,667		
2	14 January 2001	Cast Away	£2,807,312		
3	21 January 2001	Cast Away	£2,402,289		
4	28 January 2001	Cast Away	£1,838,033		
5	4 February 2001	What Women Want	£3,375,075		
6	11 February 2001	What Women Want	£2,512,404		
7	18 February 2001	Hannibal	£6,402,540	Hannibal set an opening weekend record for UIP and for an 18 certificate film. The weekend gross included £800,000 of previews.	
8	25 February 2001	Hannibal	£3,574,408		
9	4 March 2001	Hannibal	£2,026,933		
10	11 March 2001	Hannibal	£1,208,717		
11	18 March 2001	Enemy at the Gates	£1,033,164		
12	25 March 2001	Miss Congeniality	£1,873,246		
13	1 April 2001	Miss Congeniality	£1,527,576		
14	8 April 2001	Rugrats in Paris: The Movie	£1,511,553		
15	15 April 2001	Bridget Jones's Diary	£5,720,292		
16	22 April 2001	Bridget Jones's Diary	£4,260,089		
17	29 April 2001	Bridget Jones's Diary	£3,506,182		
18	6 May 2001	Bridget Jones's Diary	£2,771,790		
19	13 May 2001	Bridget Jones's Diary	£1,374,350		
20	20 May 2001	The Mummy Returns	£5,929,146		
21	27 May 2001	The Mummy Returns	£3,063,383		
22	3 June 2001	Pearl Harbor	£3,075,147		
23	10 June 2001	Pearl Harbor	£2,061,916		
24	17 June 2001	Pearl Harbor	£1,448,209		
25	24 June 2001	Evolution	£1,910,285		
26	1 July 2001	Shrek	£4,686,210		
27	8 July 2001	Lara Croft: Tomb Raider	£3,846,592		
28	15 July 2001	Shrek	£2,804,798	Shrek returned to number one in its third week of release	
29	22 July 2001	Jurassic Park III	£4,762,155		
30	29 July 2001	Jurassic Park III	£1,802,580		
31	5 August 2001	Cats & Dogs	£3,707,358		
32	12 August 2001	Cats & Dogs	£2,813,072		
33	19 August 2001	Planet of the Apes	£5,445,983		
34	26 August 2001	Planet of the Apes	£2,364,945		
35	2 September 2001	A Knight's Tale	£1,678,264		
36	9 September 2001	Moulin Rouge!	£2,403,378		
37	16 September 2001	Moulin Rouge!	£1,859,732		
38	23 September 2001	Artificial Intelligence: A.I.	£2,285,786		
39	30 September 2001	Artificial Intelligence: A.I.	£1,556,911		
40	7 October 2001	Moulin Rouge!	£1,072,657	Moulin Rouge! returned to number one in its fifth week of release	
41	14 October 2001	American Pie 2	£5,508,709		
42	21 October 2001	American Pie 2	£2,823,776		
43	28 October 2001	American Pie 2	£1,626,438		
44	4 November 2001	The Others	£2,259,538		
45	11 November 2001	The Others	£1,687,041		
46	18 November 2001	Harry Potter and the Philosopher's Stone †	£16,335,627	Harry Potter and the Philosopher's Stone set the record opening weekend beating Star Wars: Episode I – The Phantom Menace's £9.5 million. Harry Potter and the Philosopher's Stone opening included £6,735,259 from previews	
47	25 November 2001	Harry Potter and the Philosopher's Stone †	£8,362,749		
48	2 December 2001	Harry Potter and the Philosopher's Stone †	£5,809,759		
49	9 December 2001	Harry Potter and the Philosopher's Stone †	£3,345,310		
50	16 December 2001	Harry Potter and the Philosopher's Stone †	£2,391,251		
51	23 December 2001	The Lord of the Rings: The Fellowship of the Ring	£11,058,045	The Lord of the Rings: The Fellowship of the Ring opening figures included £3,755,170 from previews	
52	30 December 2001	The Lord of the Rings: The Fellowship of the Ring	£7,825,995		

== See also ==
- List of British films — British films by year
- Lists of box office number-one films

Preceded by 2000	2001	Succeeded by 2002
