= First Love, Last Rites =

1975 short story collection by Ian McEwan

- First edition cover
- Author: Ian McEwan
- Cover artist: Bill Botten
- Language: English
- Publisher: Jonathan Cape
- Publication date: 1975
- Publication place: United Kingdom
- Media type: Print (hardcover)
- Pages: 165
- ISBN: 0-224-01095-6

First Love, Last Rites is a collection of short stories by Ian McEwan. It was first published in 1975 by Jonathan Cape, with cover designed by Bill Botten, and re-issued in 1997 by Vintage.

== Context ==
The collection is McEwan's first published work and was regarded by the author (along with his second collection of short stories, In Between the Sheets) as an opportunity to experiment and find his voice as a writer. In an interview with Christopher Ricks in 1979, McEwan commented, "They were a kind of laboratory for me. They allowed me to try out different things, to discover myself as a writer." As a piece of work that portrays McEwan, the writer, at his youngest, it is perhaps fitting that the dominant theme is that of adolescence, of the blurry and perilous divide between childhood and adulthood; in addition themes of sex, perversion, and the grotesque in its many forms feature throughout.

== Stories ==
The book is composed of eight short stories, with the title story coming seventh:

- "Last Day of Summer" is an eerily haunting story of a twelve-year-old boy who, having lost his own mother, finds another mother figure in Jenny, a large woman who comes to stay with him. On one of their many journeys in his rowing boat on the Thames, however, Jenny and the baby Alice drown and die. The event is described hauntingly by McEwan "Jenny is big and my boat is small...it goes over quickly like a camera shutter" and we hear no moral judgement, no remorse, just the narrator "hanging on to the green shell with nothing in my mind." The significance seems all the more heavy because of this, Kiernan Ryan believing it to in fact suggest a "matricidal fantasy."
- "Homemade", the second story in the collection, is an unsettling tale of a self-satisfied teenager, confident in his ability to outperform his friend in every 'adult' discipline: drinking, smoking, etc., until he realises he is still a virgin. The protagonist then sets out to have sex with his ten-year-old sister, whom he does not find in the least attractive ("you could almost pass her off as plain"), under the grotesque pretence of playing 'Mummies and Daddies". We get the impression that the narrator wants to lose the shameful tag of virginity above everything else, and is desperate to assert his masculinity on something, anything. This criticism of male thinking is best summed up in the narrator's thoughts as he "felt proud, proud to be fucking, even if it were only Connie, my ten-year-old sister, even if it had been a crippled mountain goat..."
- "Butterflies" again sails close to the wind of obscenity, being told through the eyes of a socially isolated man who is not remarkable in any positive way. On one of his walks into his town's decaying underbelly, he meets a young girl and walks with her. On arrival at a deserted dry canal, he demands that she touch his penis, and after this sordid encounter, drowns her. Perhaps most harrowing is the way the protagonist describes the murder, "My mind was clear, my body was relaxed and I was thinking of nothing... I ... eased her quietly into the canal." Again morality is completely detached and the reader is made to squirm at the lack of remorse or even feeling shown.
- "Solid Geometry" takes a narrator who shuns his wife, Maisie (who seems desperate to elicit some affection from him) in favour of reading his great-grandfather's eventful diary. Ryan sees the diary as a 'symbol of patriarchal heritage," and it is fitting that it should provide the means for the protagonist to dispose of his wife once and for all. He reads a section in which his great-grandfather sees a scientist contort his body in a way that makes him disappear inside himself, and applies this to his wife. The murder is disturbingly clean, just as is the case with many of McEwan's atrocities, "As I drew her arms and legs through, Maisie appeared to turn in on herself like a sock.... all that remained was the echo of her question above the deep-blue sheets."
- "Conversation with a Cupboard Man" takes the form of a confessional by a man who was treated as a baby by his mother until the age of seventeen, when he was thrown out due to his mother remarrying and forced to fend for himself. The narrator is torn between knowing how wrong his mother's actions were "I could hardly move without her, and she loved it, the bitch" and still yearning for them "I don't want to be free."
- "Cocker at the Theatre" is the shortest story. It is an account of some acting couples who simulate sex, only to be interrupted by a couple who are having sex for real.
- "First Love, Last Rites" the title story tells the tale of a narrator and his teenage lover, Sissel, who enjoy a long summer of love making. As well as acknowledging the immense gratification he gains from satisfying his most base instincts "sperms... inches from my cock's end... the unstoppable chemistry of a creature growing out of dark red slime" the narrator details the temptation he and his lover have of wallowing in animalistic decadence. This is personified by a giant pregnant rat whose presence is felt more and more, until it bursts out from its den and attacks. The narrator bludgeons it to death and realises the significance of it when he sees "a translucent purple bag, and inside five pale crouching shapes" i.e., the baby rats. Again a female has been killed and the reader must determine the relevance themselves.
- "Disguises" involves a boy, Henry, taken under the wing of his eccentric aunt, who puts Henry in elaborate costumes for their evening meals. Things turn strange when Henry is faced with a costume consisting of a girl's wig and frock. The odd pressure on his sexuality is released when he falls in love with Linda, and McEwan seems to dissolve the boy's masculinity by having him revel in the girl's dress "invisible inside this girl." The ending is far from conclusive and we do not learn what becomes of Henry.

It has been suggested by any critics that as well as adolescence, the stories revolve around the difficulty of becoming a 'man,' whatever society deems a man to be. McEwan has described adolescents as "the perfect strangers," and through his use of first person narratives in this collection focuses on that difficult and often shocking transitional period.

== Awards ==
First Love, Last Rites received the Somerset Maugham Award for 1976; coincidentally, McEwan's friend Martin Amis had been the previous author to receive the honour.

== Reception ==
The collection was well received by critics. In the Dictionary of Literary Biography, John Fletcher wrote, "Such writing would be merely sensational if it were not, like Kafka's, pointed, so accurate, so incapable indeed of being appalled. In contemporary writing one has to turn to French literature to encounter a similar contrast between the elegance of the language and the disturbing quality of the material; in writing in English McEwan is wholly unique." Critic Robert Towers described McEwan's England in The New York Review of Books as a "flat, rubble-strewn wasteland, populated by freaks and monsters, most of them articulate enough to tell their own stories with mesmerizing narrative power and an unfaltering instinct for the perfect, sickening detail"; Towers called the collection "possibly the most brilliantly perverse and sinister batch of short stories to come out of England since Angus Wilson's The Wrong Set."

In The New York Times, Michael Mewshaw stated that "even the most measured plot synopsis may make these stories sound sensational or slightly psychopathic [...] But what sounds lurid and macabre in summary comes across on the page as poignant and often appealing. This is a tribute to Ian McEwan, a young British writer who has an extraordinary talent for humanizing potentially unpalatable characters." While Mewshaw argued that central characters in "Homemade" and "Conversation with a Cupboard Man" were literary and sophisticated to an extent that was incompatible with their situations, Mewshaw also wrote that the stories “indicate at once that [McEwan] is a writer of wit, imagination and incisiveness.” An unfavorable write-up appeared in Kirkus Reviews, however, where the reviewer complained, "There are no elements of fine drawn invention and surprise here--only too literally does he manage to soil his hands. [...] Provocation of a sort, but is it really justified by such an overwhelming fetor?"

David Malcolm stated in 2002 that "Cocker at the Theatre" is "perhaps the weakest of the stories" but referred to the others as "rather detailed and painstaking evocations of mood and feeling, of desire, shame, uncertainty, distaste, and confusion." Lucas Wittmann of The Daily Beast listed the collection in 2010 as one of McEwan's stronger pre-Atonement works along with his other short story collection, arguing, "In all of these stories lie the essence of McEwan's fictional vision, and for any fan of his work this is the place to start to understand how he has evolved as a writer even while he's never quite given up on finding humanity and dark humor in our collective foibles." Conversely, Sandra Martin wrote in The Globe and Mail that McEwan had evolved as an artist since his early works and that First Love, Last Rites is among the books in which the author is a "literary shocker" rather than an "innovative and compassionate novelist", likening it to punk rock.

== Film adaptations ==
The title story was adapted for a 1997 film of the same name. The film stars Natasha Gregson Wagner as Sissel and Giovanni Ribisi as Joey. It was directed by Jesse Peretz.

"Butterflies" has been adapted twice for cinema. In 1988 by Wolfgang Becker under the German title Schmetterlinge and in 2005 by Max Jacoby under its original English title.

"Solid Geometry" was also adapted by Channel 4 in 2002 into a short film of the same name. This adaptation was directed by Denis Lawson and stars Ewan McGregor as Phil and Ruth Millar as Maisie.

== Bibliography ==
- Malcolm, David (2002). Understanding Ian McEwan. Univ of South Carolina Press. ISBN 978-1-57003-436-7.
- Ryan, Kiernan (1994). Writers and their Work: Ian McEwan. Northcote House. ISBN 9780746307427.
