= List of 1993 box office number-one films in the United Kingdom =

This is a list of films which have placed number one at the weekend box office in the United Kingdom during 1993.

== Number one films ==
†	This implies the highest-grossing movie of the year.

#	Weekend ending	Film	Box Office	Notes	Ref
1	3 January 1993	The Bodyguard	£1,286,920		
2	10 January 1993	The Bodyguard	£1,435,628		
3	17 January 1993	The Bodyguard	£1,361,441		
4	24 January 1993	The Bodyguard	£1,182,845		
5	31 January 1993	Bram Stoker's Dracula	£2,640,584	Bram Stoker's Dracula set an opening weekend record surpassing Batman Returns' £2.5 million	
6	7 February 1993	Bram Stoker's Dracula	£1,840,433		
7	14 February 1993	Bram Stoker's Dracula	£1,123,283		
8	21 February 1993	Bram Stoker's Dracula	£714,284		
9	28 February 1993	Under Siege	£1,400,180		
10	7 March 1993	Under Siege	£886,062		
11	14 March 1993	Under Siege	£507,964		
12	21 March 1993	Scent of a Woman	£359,280	Scent of a Woman reached number one in its second week of release	
13	28 March 1993	Forever Young	£1,094,789		
14	4 April 1993	The Jungle Book (reissue)	£870,600		
15	11 April 1993	The Jungle Book (reissue)	£1,137,727		
16	18 April 1993	The Jungle Book (reissue)	£684,965		
17	25 April 1993	Sommersby	£1,190,143		
18	2 May 1993	Sommersby	£880,764		
19	9 May 1993	Groundhog Day	£748,106		
20	16 May 1993	Indecent Proposal	£1,547,925	Includes previews	
21	23 May 1993	Indecent Proposal	£1,189,918		
22	30 May 1993	Indecent Proposal	£987,297		
23	6 June 1993	Falling Down	£729,563		
24	13 June 1993	Falling Down	£682,851		
25	20 June 1993	Indecent Proposal	£449,965	Indecent Proposal returned to number one in its sixth week of release	
26	27 June 1993	Cliffhanger	£1,351,158		
27	4 July 1993	Cliffhanger	£920,773		
28	11 July 1993	Cliffhanger	£907,342		
29	18 July 1993	Jurassic Park †	£4,875,137	Jurassic Park set an opening weekend record (including £443,034 of previews) beating the record set earlier in the year by Bram Stoker's Dracula and beat Terminator 2: Judgment Day's weekly record of £4.64 million with a weekly gross of £9.2 million	
30	25 July 1993	Jurassic Park †	£4,301,647		
31	1 August 1993	Jurassic Park †	£3,360,646	Jurassic Park became the first film to gross more than £2 million for three consecutive weekends	
32	8 August 1993	Jurassic Park †	£2,686,827	Jurassic Park became the highest-grossing film of all-time in the United Kingdom	
33	15 August 1993	Jurassic Park †	£2,151,284		
34	22 August 1993	Jurassic Park †	£1,581,161		
35	29 August 1993	Jurassic Park †	£1,314,569		
36	5 September 1993	Jurassic Park †	£955,114	Jurassic Park becomes the first film to top the box office for eight consecutive weekends	
37	12 September 1993	The Firm	£1,437,712	The Firm had a record September opening. The gross included previews of £126,078.	
38	19 September 1993	The Firm	£1,055,425		
39	26 September 1993	The Fugitive	£1,616,243		
40	3 October 1993	The Fugitive	£1,548,427		
41	10 October 1993	The Fugitive	£1,309,909		
42	17 October 1993	The Fugitive	£974,357		
43	24 October 1993	The Fugitive	£820,000		
44	31 October 1993	The Fugitive	£736,992		
45	7 November 1993	The Fugitive	£526,195		
46	14 November 1993	Demolition Man	£1,376,106		
47	21 November 1993	Demolition Man	£936,758		
48	28 November 1993	Demolition Man	£603,680		
49	5 December 1993	Aladdin	£1,668,778	Aladdin set an opening record for a Disney film in the UK beating the record set by Who Framed Roger Rabbit	
50	12 December 1993	Aladdin	£1,380,028		
51	19 December 1993	Aladdin	TBD	Aladdin grossed £2,335,972 for the week ended 23 December	
52	26 December 1993	Aladdin	TBD	Aladdin grossed £2,515,240 for the week ended 30 December	

== Highest-grossing films ==
Rank	Title	Distributor	Gross (£)
1.	Jurassic Park	UIP	46,564,080
2.	The Bodyguard	Warner Bros.	14,665,069
3.	The Fugitive	Warner Bros.	14,002,047
4.	Indecent Proposal	UIP	11,885,752
5.	Bram Stoker's Dracula	Columbia TriStar	11,548,429
6.	Sleepless in Seattle	Columbia TriStar	9,417,608
7.	Cliffhanger	Guild	9,219,405
8.	A Few Good Men	Columbia TriStar	8,416,625
9.	Aladdin	Buena Vista	8,167,165
10.	The Jungle Book (reissue)	Buena Vista	7,415,989

== See also ==
- List of British films — British films by year
- Lists of box office number-one films

Preceded by 1992	1993	Succeeded by 1994
