= List of 2000 box office number-one films in the United Kingdom =

This is a list of films which have placed number one at the weekend box office in the United Kingdom during 2000.

== Number-one films ==
†	This implies the highest-grossing movie of the year.

#	Weekend End Date	Film	Box Office	Notes	Refs
1	2 January 2000	The World Is Not Enough	£797,142		
2	9 January 2000	Sleepy Hollow	£2,848,933		
3	16 January 2000	Sleepy Hollow	£1,739,653		
4	23 January 2000	Sleepy Hollow	£1,170,710		
5	30 January 2000	Double Jeopardy	£1,287,911		
6	6 February 2000	American Beauty	£2,836,678	American Beauty reached number one in its second weekend of release and had a record weekend for an 18-certificate film beating Alien Resurrection's £2.7 million.	
7	13 February 2000	Toy Story 2 †	£7,758,936	Toy Story 2, in its second week of release, had a record three-day weekend, beating Star Wars: Episode I – The Phantom Menace's 3-day opening, excluding previews.	
8	20 February 2000	Toy Story 2 †	£6,521,187		
9	27 February 2000	Toy Story 2 †	£6,301,601		
10	5 March 2000	Toy Story 2 †	£2,755,664		
11	12 March 2000	Toy Story 2 †	£1,622,052		
12	19 March 2000	Toy Story 2 †	£1,037,594		
13	26 March 2000	Toy Story 2 †	£732,926		
14	2 April 2000	Lake Placid	£931,472		
15	9 April 2000	Erin Brockovich	£1,609,930		
16	16 April 2000	Pokémon: The First Movie	£2,833,721		
17	23 April 2000	Kevin & Perry Go Large	£2,404,517		
18	30 April 2000	Scream 3	£2,449,937		
19	7 May 2000	Kevin & Perry Go Large	£923,483	Kevin & Perry Go Large returned to number one in its third week of release	
10	14 May 2000	Gladiator	£3,555,446		
21	21 May 2000	Gladiator	£3,459,104		
22	28 May 2000	Gladiator	£2,987,696		
23	4 June 2000	Gladiator	£2,073,765		
24	11 June 2000	Gladiator	£1,401,766		
25	18 June 2000	Gladiator	£613,491		
26	25 June 2000	Gladiator	£976,300		
27	2 July 2000	Chicken Run	£3,848,755		
28	9 July 2000	Mission: Impossible 2	£4,621,948		
29	16 July 2000	Chicken Run	£2,573,372	Chicken Run returned to number one in its third week of release	
30	23 July 2000	Stuart Little	£1,694,498	Stuart Little reached number one in its fourth week of release	
31	30 July 2000	The Perfect Storm	£2,181,194		
32	6 August 2000	Gone in 60 Seconds	£1,715,147		
33	13 August 2000	Gone in 60 Seconds	£1,021,267		
34	20 August 2000	X-Men	£4,749,241		
35	27 August 2000	X-Men	£2,026,544		
36	3 September 2000	Snatch	£3,180,002	Snatch beat American Beauty's record weekend for an 18-certificate film	
37	10 September 2000	Scary Movie	£3,191,096		
38	17 September 2000	Scary Movie	£1,460,710		
39	24 September 2000	Me, Myself & Irene	£1,292,512		
40	1 October 2000	Hollow Man	£1,634,386		
41	8 October 2000	Nutty Professor II: The Klumps	£1,780,521		
42	15 October 2000	Dinosaur	£2,128,218		
43	22 October 2000	What Lies Beneath	£2,258,893		
44	29 October 2000	Dinosaur	£2,173,178	Dinosaur returned to number one in its third week of release	
45	5 November 2000	What Lies Beneath	£1,341,518	What Lies Beneath returned to number one in its third week of release	
46	12 November 2000	Bedazzled	£1,112,178		
47	19 November 2000	What Lies Beneath	£811,997	What Lies Beneath returned to number one in its fifth week of release	
48	26 November 2000	Charlie's Angels	£3,182,114		
49	3 December 2000	How the Grinch Stole Christmas	£3,063,799		
50	10 December 2000	How the Grinch Stole Christmas	£2,547,769		
51	17 December 2000	Meet the Parents	£2,261,785		
52	24 December 2000	How the Grinch Stole Christmas	£1,588,377		
53	31 December 2000	Unbreakable	£2,002,862		

== Highest grossing films ==
Rank	Title	Distributor	Domestic gross £m
1.	Toy Story 2	Buena Vista	£43.1
2.	Gladiator	UIP	£30.7
3.	Chicken Run	Pathé	£29.2
4.	American Beauty	UIP	£21.1
5.	Stuart Little	CTSI	£17.7
6.	Mission: Impossible 2	UIP	£17.1
7.	Billy Elliot	UIP	£16.5
8.	X-Men	Fox	£14.8
9.	The Beach	Fox	£13.2
10.	What Lies Beneath	Fox	£13.1

== See also ==
- List of British films — British films by year

Preceded by 1999	2000	Succeeded by 2001
