= List of 1996 box office number-one films in the United Kingdom =

This is a list of films which have placed number one at the weekend box office in the United Kingdom during 1996.

== Number one films ==
†	This implies the highest-grossing movie of the year.

#	Weekend End Date	Film	Total Weekend Gross	Notes	Ref
1	January 7, 1996	Seven	£2,628,821	Seven had a record opening weekend for an independent release	
2	January 14, 1996	Seven	£2,672,896		
3	January 21, 1996	Seven	£2,153,223		
4	January 28, 1996	Seven	£1,403,435		
5	February 4, 1996	Heat	£1,624,316	Heat reached number one in its second weekend of release	
6	February 11, 1996	Heat	£1,352,356		
7	February 18, 1996	Jumanji	£2,166,563		
8	February 25, 1996	Jumanji	£2,420,940		
9	March 3, 1996	Jumanji	£1,352,947		
10	March 10, 1996	Trainspotting	£1,422,906	Trainspotting reached number one in its third week of release	
11	March 17, 1996	Get Shorty	£1,087,453		
12	March 24, 1996	Toy Story	£3,387,160	Toy Story set a record opening for an animated film beating The Lion King's £2.5 million. It was also a record opening for March and for Buena Vista.	
13	March 31, 1996	Toy Story	£2,430,057		
14	April 7, 1996	Toy Story	£2,073,045		
15	April 14, 1996	Toy Story	£1,883,603		
16	April 21, 1996	12 Monkeys	£1,363,967		
17	April 28, 1996	12 Monkeys	£918,261		
18	May 5, 1996	The Birdcage	£746,965	The Birdcage reached number one in its second week of release	
19	May 12, 1996	Executive Decision	£592,110		
20	May 19, 1996	Executive Decision	£424,177		
21	May 26, 1996	Spy Hard	£663,820		
22	June 2, 1996	From Dusk till Dawn	£501,303		
23	June 9, 1996	Up Close and Personal	£542,315		
24	June 16, 1996	Up Close and Personal	£350,710		
25	June 23, 1996	The Rock	£1,422,041		
26	June 30, 1996	The Rock	£1,217,266		
27	July 7, 1996	Mission: Impossible	£4,161,780		
28	July 14, 1996	Mission: Impossible	£2,211,738		
29	July 21, 1996	Mission: Impossible	£1,159,872		
30	July 28, 1996	Twister	£3,044,033		
31	August 4, 1996	Twister	£1,790,501		
32	August 11, 1996	Independence Day †	£7,005,905	Independence Day beat Jurassic Park's opening weekend record of £4,875,137	
33	August 18, 1996	Independence Day †	£3,905,792		
34	August 25, 1996	Independence Day †	£3,340,577		
35	September 1, 1996	Independence Day †	£2,038,470		
36	September 8, 1996	Independence Day †	£1,373,550		
37	September 15, 1996	Independence Day †	£968,780		
38	September 22, 1996	Independence Day †	£797,494		
39	September 29, 1996	Last Man Standing	£678,839		
40	October 6, 1996	The Nutty Professor	£2,278,236		
41	October 13, 1996	The Nutty Professor	£1,918,448		
42	October 20, 1996	The Nutty Professor	£1,288,056		
43	October 27, 1996	Dragonheart	£1,071,947	Dragonheart reached number one in its second week of release	
44	November 3, 1996	Dragonheart	£722,106		
45	November 10, 1996	Michael Collins	£1,160,575	Michael Collins's opening gross from the Republic of Ireland of £442,867 was a record	
46	November 17, 1996	The First Wives Club	£1,151,858		
47	November 24, 1996	The First Wives Club	£915,539		
48	December 1, 1996	The Long Kiss Goodnight	£1,195,105		
49	December 8, 1996	Jingle All the Way	£943,769		
50	December 15, 1996	101 Dalmatians	£2,360,762	101 Dalmatians set a record for a December opening	
51	December 22, 1996	101 Dalmatians	£2,000,000		
52	December 29, 1996	101 Dalmatians	£2,200,000		

== Highest-grossing films ==
Highest-grossing films for the calendar year

Rank	Title	Distributor	Gross
1.	Independence Day	20th Century Fox	£36,867,029
2.	Toy Story	Buena Vista	£22,163,663
3.	Seven	Entertainment	£19,516,175
4.	Mission: Impossible	UIP	£18,619,357
5.	Twister	UIP	£15,004,691
6.	Sense and Sensibility	Columbia TriStar	£13,605,627
7.	Babe	UIP	£13,547,941
8.	Jumanji	Columbia TriStar	£13,441,279
9.	Trainspotting	PolyGram	£12,431,664
10.	The Nutty Professor	UIP	£12,200,000

== See also ==
- List of British films — British films by year

== Chronology ==
Preceded by 1995	1996	Succeeded by 1997
