= List of 1992 box office number-one films in the United Kingdom =

This is a list of films which have placed number one at the weekly box office in the United Kingdom during 1992.

== Number one films ==
†	This implies the highest-grossing movie of the year.

#	Week ending	Film	Box office	Notes	Ref
1	2 January 1992	The Addams Family	£2,138,137		
2	9 January 1992	The Addams Family	£1,565,622		
3	16 January 1992	The Addams Family	£1,030,084		
4	23 January 1992	Freddy's Dead: The Final Nightmare	£1,644,019		
5	30 January 1992	JFK	£1,245,488		
6	6 February 1992	JFK	£1,230,304		
7	13 February 1992	My Girl	£1,652,035	My Girl reached number one in its second week of release	
8	20 February 1992	My Girl	£1,713,568		
9	27 February 1992	Father of the Bride	£1,903,985		
10	5 March 1992	Father of the Bride	£1,129,947		
11	12 March 1992	Father of the Bride	£910,867		
12	19 March 1992	Cape Fear	£2,758,920	Cape Fear reached number one in its second week of release. It set a record March nationwide opening weekend with a gross of £1,665,000	
13	26 March 1992	Cape Fear	£2,042,832		
14	2 April 1992	Cape Fear	£1,414,001		
15	9 April 1992	Cape Fear	£1,058,411		
16	16 April 1992	Hook	£3,236,314		
17	23 April 1992	Hook	£3,627,112		
18	30 April 1992	Hook	£1,898,638		
19	7 May 1992	The Hand That Rocks the Cradle	£1,539,548	The Hand That Rocks the Cradle reached number one in its second week of release	
20	14 May 1992	Basic Instinct †	£3,624,440	Basic Instinct set a record May opening weekend with a gross of £2,169,000	
21	21 May 1992	Basic Instinct †	£2,333,122		
22	28 May 1992	Wayne's World	£1,962,473		
23	4 June 1992	Wayne's World	£1,581,563		
24	11 June 1992	Wayne's World	£1,186,599		
25	18 June 1992	Basic Instinct †	£782,191	Basic Instinct returned to number one in its sixth week of release	
26	25 June 1992	Wayne's World	£664,094	Wayne's World returned to number one in its fifth week of release	
27	2 July 1992	Wayne's World	£608,548		
28	9 July 1992	Sleepwalkers	£691,617		
29	16 July 1992	Batman Returns	£4,312,764	Batman Returns set an opening weekend record with a gross of £2,774,796 (£2,526,446 excluding previews) beating Terminator 2: Judgment Day's £2.3 million	
30	23 July 1992	Batman Returns	£2,473,467		
31	30 July 1992	Batman Returns	£1,522,201		
32	6 August 1992	Universal Soldier	£1,349,087	Universal Soldier reached number one in its second week of release	
33	13 August 1992	Beethoven	£1,185,719	Beethoven reached number one in its third week of release	
34	20 August 1992	Lethal Weapon 3	£4,171,402		
35	27 August 1992	Alien 3	£2,683,497		
36	3 September 1992	Lethal Weapon 3	£1,885,401	Lethal Weapon 3 returned to number one in its third week of release	
37	10 September 1992	Lethal Weapon 3	£1,144,846		
38	17 September 1992	Housesitter	£1,190,085		
39	24 September 1992	Unforgiven	£1,434,711		
40	1 October 1992	Patriot Games	£1,698,592		
41	8 October 1992	Patriot Games	£1,297,691		
42	15 October 1992	Patriot Games	£1,017,310		
43	22 October 1992	Beauty and the Beast	£1,899,246	Beauty and the Beast reached number one in its second week of release	
44	29 October 1992	Beauty and the Beast	£3,612,762		
45	5 November 1992	Beauty and the Beast	£1,607,880		
46	12 November 1992	The Last of the Mohicans	£1,289,427		
47	19 November 1992	The Last of the Mohicans	£1,070,980		
48	26 November 1992	Single White Female	£1,451,694		
49	3 December 1992	Sister Act	£2,266,392		
50	10 December 1992	Death Becomes Her	£1,643,994		
51	17 December 1992	Home Alone 2: Lost in New York	£2,995,947	Home Alone 2 set a record December opening weekend with a gross of £2,128,000	
52	24 December 1992	Home Alone 2: Lost in New York	£2,903,628		
53	31 December 1992	The Bodyguard	£1,295,415	Weekend only. The Bodyguard set a record Christmas opening	

== Highest-grossing films ==
Highest-grossing films in the U.K. between 1 December 1991 and 29 November 1992

Rank	Title	Distributor	Gross (£)
1.	Basic Instinct	Guild	15,471,799
2.	Hook	Columbia TriStar	13,099,578
3.	Lethal Weapon 3	Warner Bros.	11,878,179
4.	Batman Returns	Warner Bros.	10,979,599
5.	The Addams Family	Columbia TriStar	10,396,698
6.	Cape Fear	UIP	10,360,215
7.	Beauty and the Beast	Walt Disney Pictures	9,538,000
8.	Wayne's World	UIP	9,133,551
9.	My Girl	Columbia TriStar	7,629,917
10.	The Hand That Rocks the Cradle	Buena Vista Pictures Distribution	7,306,665

== See also ==
- List of British films — British films by year
- Lists of box office number-one films

Preceded by 1991	1992	Succeeded by 1993
