= List of 1995 box office number-one films in the United Kingdom =

This is a list of films which have placed number one at the weekly box office in the United Kingdom during 1995.

== Number one films ==
†	This implies the highest-grossing movie of the year.

#	Week ending	Film	Box Office	Notes	Ref
1	5 January 1995	The Specialist	£1,555,832		
2	12 January 1995	Timecop	£1,549,564		
3	19 January 1995	Stargate	£3,056,586		
4	26 January 1995	Interview with the Vampire	£3,799,972		
5	2 February 1995	Interview with the Vampire	£2,668,698		
6	9 February 1995	Interview with the Vampire	£1,643,651		
7	16 February 1995	Star Trek Generations	£2,995,104		
8	23 February 1995	Star Trek Generations	£2,078,332		
9	2 March 1995	Natural Born Killers	£1,802,145		
10	9 March 1995	Natural Born Killers	£1,198,567		
11	16 March 1995	Disclosure	£2,639,354		
12	23 March 1995	Disclosure	£1,738,581		
13	30 March 1995	Disclosure	£1,116,861		
14	6 April 1995	Disclosure	£775,214		
15	12 April 1995	Dumb and Dumber	£2,416,012		
16	19 April 1995	Dumb and Dumber	£2,139,988		
17	27 April 1995	Dumb and Dumber	£1,172,200		
18	4 May 1995	Legends of the Fall	£1,221,196		
19	11 May 1995	Muriel's Wedding	£804,534	Muriel's Wedding reached number one in its fourth week of release	
20	18 May 1995	Muriel's Wedding	£812,900		
21	25 May 1995	Street Fighter	£834,870		
22	1 June 1995	Rob Roy	£1,267,632	Rob Roy reached number one in its second week of release	
23	8 June 1995	Rob Roy	£898,208		
24	15 June 1995	The Brady Bunch Movie	£704,687		
25	22 June 1995	Bad Boys	£1,363,603		
26	29 June 1995	Bad Boys	£899,270		
27	6 July 1995	Congo	£1,513,277		
28	13 July 1995	First Knight	£1,541,894		
29	20 July 1995	Batman Forever †	£7,524,402	Batman Forever set an opening weekend record for Warner Bros. with a gross of £4,714,000	
30	27 July 1995	Batman Forever †	£4,478,142		
31	3 August 1995	Casper	£3,498,125		
32	10 August 1995	Casper	£2,896,093		
33	17 August 1995	Waterworld	£2,892,084		
34	24 August 1995	Die Hard with a Vengeance	£3,278,452		
35	31 August 1995	Die Hard with a Vengeance	£2,689,618		
36	7 September 1995	While You Were Sleeping	£2,225,430		
37	14 September 1995	Braveheart	£2,254,317		
38	21 September 1995	Braveheart	£1,880,292		
39	28 September 1995	Apollo 13	£3,510,955	Apollo 13 had a record opening weekend for September with a gross of £2,359,000	
40	5 October 1995	Apollo 13	£2,521,478		
41	12 October 1995	Apollo 13	£1,767,980		
42	19 October 1995	Pocahontas	£1,978,974	Pocahontas reached number one in its second week of release	
43	25 October 1995	Pocahontas	£3,807,886	Six days only	
44	2 November 1995	Pocahontas	£1,974,067		
45	9 November 1995	French Kiss	£1,110,781		
46	16 November 1995	Crimson Tide	£1,911,929	Crimson Tide reached number one in its second week of release	
47	23 November 1995	Crimson Tide	£1,454,761		
48	30 November 1995	GoldenEye	£5,554,527	GoldenEye set a record non-holiday opening with an opening weekend of £3,589,000	
49	7 December 1995	GoldenEye	£3,623,747		
50	14 December 1995	GoldenEye	£2,197,895		
51	21 December 1995	Babe	£2,555,856		
52	28 December 1995	Babe	£2,549,888		

== Highest-grossing films ==
Highest-grossing films in the U.K. for the calendar year

Rank	Title	Distributor	Gross
1.	Batman Forever	Warner Bros.	£20,015,001
2.	Casper	UIP	£15,965,083
3.	GoldenEye	UIP	£14,785,675
4.	Apollo 13	UIP	£11,912,733
5.	Braveheart	20th Century Fox	£11,358,882
6.	Interview with the Vampire	Warner Bros.	£10,515,385
7.	Pocahontas	Buena Vista	£10,387,314
8.	Die Hard with a Vengeance	Buena Vista	£10,181,784
9.	Stargate	Guild	£9,781,482
10.	Dumb and Dumber	First Independent	£9,511,120

== See also ==
- List of British films — British films by year

Preceded by 1994	1995	Succeeded by 1996
