= List of 1991 box office number-one films in the United Kingdom =

This is a list of films which have placed number one at the weekly box office in the United Kingdom during 1991.

== Number one films ==
†	This implies the highest-grossing movie of the year.

#	Week ending	Film	Box Office	Notes	Ref
1	3 January 1991	Home Alone	£1,639,898		
2	10 January 1991	Arachnophobia	£1,305,699		
3	17 January 1991	Arachnophobia	£1,221,939		
4	24 January 1991	Arachnophobia	£1,062,383		
5	31 January 1991	Rocky V	£1,826,024		
6	7 February 1991	Kindergarten Cop	£1,995,320		
7	14 February 1991	Three Men and a Little Lady	£2,358,154		
8	21 February 1991	Three Men and a Little Lady	£3,002,703		
9	28 February 1991	Three Men and a Little Lady	£1,947,367		
10	7 March 1991	Three Men and a Little Lady	£1,425,722		
11	14 March 1991	Three Men and a Little Lady	£1,152,053		
12	21 March 1991	Green Card	£1,167,612	Green Card reached number one in its third week of release	
13	28 March 1991	Look Who's Talking Too	£1,903,552		
14	4 April 1991	Look Who's Talking Too	£1,414,050		
15	11 April 1991	Dances With Wolves	£1,201,344	Dances with Wolves reached number one in its ninth week of release	
16	18 April 1991	Highlander II: The Quickening	£1,984,265		
17	25 April 1991	Sleeping with the Enemy	£2,130,968	Sleeping with the Enemy reached number one in its second week of release	
18	2 May 1991	Sleeping with the Enemy	£1,723,382		
19	9 May 1991	Sleeping with the Enemy	£1,466,686		
20	16 May 1991	The Doors	£1,063,510	The Doors reached number one in its third week of release	
21	23 May 1991	Misery	£1,072,609	Misery reached number one in its second week of release	
22	30 May 1991	Misery	£863,375		
23	6 June 1991	Mermaids	£989,064	Mermaids reached number one in its second week of release	
24	13 June 1991	The Silence of the Lambs	£4,260,472	The Silence of the Lambs reached number one in its second week of release and beat the one week record set by Batman	
25	20 June 1991	The Silence of the Lambs	£3,566,735		
26	27 June 1991	The Silence of the Lambs	£2,532,977		
27	4 July 1991	The Naked Gun 2½: The Smell of Fear	£2,587,730		
28	11 July 1991	The Naked Gun 2½: The Smell of Fear	£1,621,072		
29	18 July 1991	The Naked Gun 2½: The Smell of Fear	£1,426,471		
30	25 July 1991	Robin Hood: Prince of Thieves †	£2,372,538		
31	1 August 1991	Robin Hood: Prince of Thieves †	£2,300,000		
32	8 August 1991	Robin Hood: Prince of Thieves †	£1,991,986		
33	15 August 1991	Robin Hood: Prince of Thieves †	£1,831,174		
34	22 August 1991	Terminator 2: Judgment Day	£4,631,895	Terminator 2 set an opening weekend record of £2,337,980 beating Batman's £2 million and beat the opening week record set by Silence of the Lambs earlier in the year	
35	29 August 1991	Terminator 2: Judgment Day	£3,564,891		
36	5 September 1991	Terminator 2: Judgment Day	£2,395,446		
37	12 September 1991	Terminator 2: Judgment Day	£1,807,188		
38	19 September 1991	Terminator 2: Judgment Day	£1,541,718		
39	26 September 1991	Terminator 2: Judgment Day	£1,085,761		
40	3 October 1991	Terminator 2: Judgment Day	£868,862		
41	10 October 1991	Robin Hood: Prince of Thieves †	£723,922	Robin Hood: Prince of Thieves returned to number one in its twelfth week of release	
42	17 October 1991	The Commitments	£779,674	The Commitments reached number one in its second week of release	
43	24 October 1991	The Commitments	£1,298,137		
44	31 October 1991	The Commitments	£1,172,034		
45	7 November 1991	City Slickers	£1,005,788	City Slickers reached number one in its third week of release	
46	14 November 1991	The Fisher King	£820,557		
47	21 November 1991	The Fisher King	£666,523		
48	28 November 1991	Point Break	£1,190,599		
49	5 December 1991	Point Break	£841,788		
50	12 December 1991	Hot Shots!	£1,852,988	Hot Shots! reached number one in its second week of release	
51	19 December 1991	The Addams Family	£2,017,379		
52	26 December 1991	The Addams Family	£1,464,784		

== Highest-grossing films ==
Highest-grossing films of 1991
Rank	Title	Distributor	Gross (£)
1.	Robin Hood: Prince of Thieves	Warner Bros.	20,104,692
2.	Terminator 2: Judgment Day	Guild	18,179,609
3.	The Silence of the Lambs	Rank	17,119,333
4.	Three Men and a Little Lady	Warner Bros.	12,967,783
5.	Dances with Wolves	Guild	10,598,273
6.	Sleeping with the Enemy	20th Century Fox	9,230,825
7.	The Naked Gun 2½: The Smell of Fear	UIP	8,790,453
8.	Home Alone	20th Century Fox	8,353,519 (Note: The chart per The Guinness Book of Box Office Hits lists Home Alone in fifth place but does not report the gross)
9.	Kindergarten Cop	UIP	8,216,680
10.	The Commitments	20th Century Fox	6,997,113

== See also ==
- List of British films — British films by year
- Lists of box office number-one films

== Notes ==
Preceded by 1990	1991	Succeeded by 1992
