= List of 1999 box office number-one films in the United Kingdom =

This is a list of films which have placed number one at the weekend box office in the United Kingdom during 1999.

== Number-one films ==
†	This implies the highest-grossing movie of the year.

#	Weekend End Date	Film	Box Office	Notes	Ref
1	3 January 1999	Star Trek: Insurrection	£2,706,800		
2	10 January 1999	Star Trek: Insurrection	£1,132,823		
3	17 January 1999	Meet Joe Black	£986,511		
4	24 January 1999	Practical Magic	£1,001,536		
5	31 January 1999	Shakespeare in Love	£1,819,385		
6	7 February 1999	A Bug's Life	£4,204,678	A Bug's Life set a record opening for an animated film, surpassing Toy Story's £3.3 million	
7	14 February 1999	A Bug's Life	£4,107,566		
8	21 February 1999	A Bug's Life	£4,311,358		
9	28 February 1999	A Bug's Life	£2,220,635		
10	7 March 1999	A Bug's Life	£1,509,076		
11	14 March 1999	Patch Adams	£786,778		
12	21 March 1999	Waking Ned	£911,901		
13	28 March 1999	The Rugrats Movie	£1,971,685		
14	4 April 1999	The Rugrats Movie	£1,403,862		
15	11 April 1999	The Rugrats Movie	£1,326,486		
16	18 April 1999	The Faculty	£822,777		
17	25 April 1999	8MM	£733,535		
18	2 May 1999	The Waterboy	£887,245		
19	9 May 1999	I Still Know What You Did Last Summer	£802,498		
20	16 May 1999	Forces of Nature	£493,897		
21	23 May 1999	She's All That	£1,200,565		
22	30 May 1999	Notting Hill	£4,323,678		
23	6 June 1999	Notting Hill	£3,004,696		
24	13 June 1999	The Matrix	£3,384,948		
25	20 June 1999	The Matrix	£2,275,576		
26	27 June 1999	The Mummy	£3,771,429		
27	4 July 1999	The Mummy	£2,535,195		
28	11 July 1999	The Mummy	£1,278,869		
29	18 July 1999	Star Wars: Episode I – The Phantom Menace †	£9,528,131	The Phantom Menace beat the record opening of Men in Black	
30	25 July 1999	Star Wars: Episode I – The Phantom Menace †	£5,104,514		
31	1 August 1999	Austin Powers: The Spy Who Shagged Me	£6,005,087		
32	8 August 1999	Austin Powers: The Spy Who Shagged Me	£3,421,492		
33	15 August 1999	Wild Wild West	£2,487,176		
34	22 August 1999	Star Wars Episode I: The Phantom Menace †	£1,420,885		
35	29 August 1999	South Park: Bigger, Longer & Uncut	£1,496,581		
36	5 September 1999	South Park: Bigger, Longer & Uncut	£813,613		
37	12 September 1999	Eyes Wide Shut	£1,189,672		
38	19 September 1999	Eyes Wide Shut	£881,889		
39	26 September 1999	The Haunting	£1,562,169		
40	3 October 1999	Big Daddy	£1,360,121		
41	10 October 1999	American Pie	£2,094,122		
42	17 October 1999	Deep Blue Sea	£1,946,454		
43	24 October 1999	Tarzan	£3,055,218		
44	31 October 1999	The Blair Witch Project	£5,875,318		
45	7 November 1999	The Blair Witch Project	£2,290,106		
46	14 November 1999	The Sixth Sense	£4,792,296		
47	21 November 1999	The Sixth Sense	£3,277,054		
48	28 November 1999	The World Is Not Enough	£6,273,584		
49	5 December 1999	The World Is Not Enough	£3,842,119		
50	12 December 1999	The World Is Not Enough	£2,329,718		
51	19 December 1999	The World Is Not Enough	£1,389,490		
52	26 December 1999	The World Is Not Enough	£336,718		

== Highest grossing films ==
Rank	Title	Distributor	Domestic gross £m
1.	Star Wars: Episode I – The Phantom Menace	Fox	£50.9
2.	Notting Hill	UIP	£30.7
3.	A Bug's Life	Buena Vista International (BVI)	£29.3
4.	Austin Powers: The Spy Who Shagged Me	Entertainment	£25.8
5.	The World Is Not Enough	UIP	£23.4
6.	The Sixth Sense	BVI	£20.6
7.	Shakespeare in Love	UIP	£20.4
8.	The Mummy	UIP	£17.4
9.	The Matrix	Warner Bros.	£17.3
10.	Tarzan	BVI	£16.9

== See also ==
- List of British films – British films by year
- Lists of box office number-one films

Preceded by 1998	1999	Succeeded by 2000
