= List of 1994 box office number-one films in the United Kingdom =

This is a list of films which have placed number one at the weekly box office in the United Kingdom during 1994.

== Number one films ==
†	This implies the highest-grossing movie of the year.

#	Week ending	Film	Box Office	Notes	Ref
1	6 January 1994	Aladdin	£2,318,095		
2	13 January 1994	Aladdin	£988,035		
3	20 January 1994	Aladdin	£863,548		
4	27 January 1994	Tombstone	£937,700		
5	3 February 1994	Mrs. Doubtfire	£4,308,602	Mrs. Doubtfire had a record opening for 20th Century Fox with an opening weekend gross of £2,633,285	
6	10 February 1994	Mrs. Doubtfire	£3,820,614		
7	17 February 1994	Mrs. Doubtfire	£3,366,278		
8	24 February 1994	Mrs. Doubtfire	£2,585,384		
9	3 March 1994	Mrs. Doubtfire	£1,794,833		
10	10 March 1994	Philadelphia	£1,533,479	Philadelphia reached number one in its second week of release	
11	17 March 1994	Schindler's List	£1,297,268	Schindler's List reached number one in its fourth week of release	
12	24 March 1994	Schindler's List	£1,371,165		
13	30 March 1994	Schindler's List	£1,322,811	6-day total	
14	7 April 1994	Beethoven's 2nd	£1,915,722		
15	14 April 1994	Schindler's List	£1,174,338	Schindler's List returned to number one in its eighth week of release	
16	21 April 1994	Schindler's List	£995,925		
17	28 April 1994	Schindler's List	£1,988,326		
18	5 May 1994	Ace Ventura: Pet Detective	£1,198,977		
19	12 May 1994	Ace Ventura: Pet Detective	£834,922		
20	19 May 1994	Four Weddings and a Funeral †	£2,664,577	Four Weddings and a Funeral's opening weekend gross of £1.4 million was a record for a UK production	
21	26 May 1994	Four Weddings and a Funeral †	£2,712,387		
22	2 June 1994	Four Weddings and a Funeral †	£2,633,994		
23	9 June 1994	Four Weddings and a Funeral †	£2,432,374		
24	16 June 1994	Four Weddings and a Funeral †	£2,060,957		
25	23 June 1994	Four Weddings and a Funeral †	£1,766,929		
26	30 June 1994	Four Weddings and a Funeral †	£1,818,278		
27	7 July 1994	Four Weddings and a Funeral †	£1,377,387		
28	14 July 1994	Four Weddings and a Funeral †	£1,219,690		
29	21 July 1994	Maverick	£1,494,925		
30	28 July 1994	The Flintstones	£5,699,403		
31	4 August 1994	The Flintstones	£4,989,471		
32	11 August 1994	The Flintstones	£3,476,401		
33	18 August 1994	True Lies	£3,793,002		
34	25 August 1994	The Mask	£3,894,225		
35	1 September 1994	The Mask	£3,736,351		
36	8 September 1994	The Mask	£2,236,809		
37	15 September 1994	The Mask	£1,585,553		
38	22 September 1994	Clear and Present Danger	£1,908,206		
39	29 September 1994	Clear and Present Danger	£1,345,871		
40	6 October 1994	Speed	£3,439,858		
41	13 October 1994	Forrest Gump	£2,972,674		
42	20 October 1994	The Lion King	£3,736,208	The Lion King reached number one in its second week of release with a record nationwide opening weekend gross for an animated film of £2.5 million and a record for October and Buena Vista	
43	27 October 1994	The Lion King	£6,482,582		
44	3 November 1994	The Lion King	£3,570,885		
45	10 November 1994	Mary Shelley's Frankenstein	£2,003,901		
46	17 November 1994	Mary Shelley's Frankenstein	£1,653,394		
47	24 November 1994	The Lion King	£987,679	The Lion King returned to number one in its seventh week of release	
48	1 December 1994	Highlander III: The Sorcerer	£863,973		
49	8 December 1994	Miracle on 34th Street	£1,333,461		
50	15 December 1994	Miracle on 34th Street	£1,230,067		
51	22 December 1994	Miracle on 34th Street	£1,633,926		
52	29 December 1994	Miracle on 34th Street	£979,217		

== Highest-grossing films ==
List of highest-grossing films by calendar year.

Rank	Title	Distributor	Gross
1.	Four Weddings and a Funeral	Rank/Polygram	£27,448,517
2.	Mrs. Doubtfire	Fox	£21,010,011
3.	The Lion King	Buena Vista	£20,461,949
4.	The Flintstones	UIP	£20,168,826
5.	The Mask	Entertainment Film Distributors	£17,278,396
6.	Forrest Gump	UIP	£13,927,138
7.	True Lies	UIP	£13,888,752
8.	Schindler's List	UIP	£13,838,103
9.	Speed	Fox	£10,621,820
10.	Philadelphia	Columbia TriStar	£9,996,313

Highest-grossing films of 1994 by BBFC rating
U	The Lion King
PG	The Mask
12	Mrs. Doubtfire
15	Four Weddings and a Funeral
18	Pulp Fiction

== See also ==
- List of British films — British films by year
- Lists of box office number-one films

Preceded by 1993	1994	Succeeded by 1995
