= List of 1998 box office number-one films in the United Kingdom =

This is a list of films which have placed number one at the weekend box office in the United Kingdom during 1998.

== Number-one films ==
†	This implies the highest-grossing movie of the year.

#	Weekend End Date	Film	Box Office	Notes	Ref
1	January 4, 1998	Starship Troopers	£2,221,631		
2	January 11, 1998	The Jackal	£1,422,193		
3	January 18, 1998	The Devil's Advocate	£1,213,771		
4	January 25, 1998	Titanic †	£4,805,270	Titanic set a record opening for January beating Bram Stoker's Dracula's £2.6 million	
5	February 1, 1998	Titanic †	£4,773,404		
6	February 8, 1998	Titanic †	£4,274,375		
7	February 15, 1998	Titanic †	£3,849,120		
8	February 22, 1998	Titanic †	£3,657,613		
9	March 1, 1998	Titanic †	£3,403,199		
10	March 8, 1998	Titanic †	£3,010,921		
11	March 15, 1998	Titanic †	£2,469,191		
12	March 22, 1998	Titanic †	£1,953,082		
13	March 29, 1998	Titanic †	£2,223,046		
14	April 5, 1998	Titanic †	£1,504,551		
15	April 12, 1998	Titanic †	£1,373,363		
16	April 19, 1998	Titanic †	£981,940		
17	April 26, 1998	U.S. Marshals	£780,012		
18	May 3, 1998	Scream 2	£2,493,950		
19	May 10, 1998	Scream 2	£1,213,184		
20	May 17, 1998	Deep Impact	£1,763,805		
21	May 24, 1998	Deep Impact	£1,601,651		
22	May 31, 1998	Deep Impact	£1,070,805		
23	June 7, 1998	The Wedding Singer	£1,031,660		
24	June 14, 1998	The Wedding Singer	£974,719		
25	June 21, 1998	City of Angels	£1,141,654		
26	June 28, 1998	City of Angels	£674,705		
27	July 5, 1998	Six Days Seven Nights	£908,713		
28	July 12, 1998	Six Days Seven Nights	£706,928		
29	July 19, 1998	Godzilla	£4,176,960		
30	July 26, 1998	Godzilla	£2,145,088		
31	August 2, 1998	Lost in Space	£3,127,079		
32	August 9, 1998	Armageddon	£2,732,785		
33	August 16, 1998	Armageddon	£2,243,095		
34	August 23, 1998	The X-Files	£2,506,148		
35	August 30, 1998	The X-Files	£1,192,131		
36	September 6, 1998	Lock, Stock and Two Smoking Barrels	£1,147,448		
37	September 13, 1998	Saving Private Ryan	£2,704,522		
38	September 20, 1998	Saving Private Ryan	£2,077,362		
39	September 27, 1998	There's Something About Mary	£2,076,411		
40	October 4, 1998	There's Something About Mary	£2,026,662		
41	October 11, 1998	The Truman Show	£2,210,999		
42	October 18, 1998	The Truman Show	£1,687,037		
43	October 25, 1998	Small Soldiers	£1,137,725		
44	November 1, 1998	The Exorcist	£2,186,977		
45	November 8, 1998	Antz	£1,650,562		
46	November 15, 1998	Antz	£1,737,782		
47	November 22, 1998	Antz	£1,357,591		
48	November 29, 1998	Antz	£978,414		
49	December 6, 1998	Rush Hour	£1,809,093		
50	December 13, 1998	Rush Hour	£1,179,123		
51	December 20, 1998	Rush Hour	£744,783		
52	December 27, 1998	Enemy of the State	£1,420,216		

== See also ==
- List of British films — British films by year

Preceded by 1997	1998	Succeeded by 1999
