= List of 2003 box office number-one films in the United Kingdom =

This is a list of films which have placed number one at the weekend box office in the United Kingdom during 2003.

== Number-one films ==
†	This implies the highest-grossing movie of the year.

#	Weekend End Date	Film	Box office	Openings
1	January 5, 2003	The Lord of the Rings: The Two Towers	£5,774,170	Star Trek: Nemesis (#2), City of God (#6), Spider (#11)
2	January 12, 2003	The Lord of the Rings: The Two Towers	£3,728,876	Gangs of New York (#2), The Tuxedo (#3), The Good Girl (#9), City by the Sea (#12)
3	January 19, 2003	8 Mile	£4,440,334	The Transporter (#9), Dil Ka Rishta (#12), The Master of Disguise (#14)
4	January 26, 2003	8 Mile	£2,514,467	I Spy (#5), Ghost Ship (#6), About Schmidt (#7), The Pianist (#10)
5	February 2, 2003	Catch Me If You Can	£3,720,957	The Banger Sisters (#11)
6	February 9, 2003	Two Weeks Notice	£2,636,050	Final Destination 2 (#3), The Wild Thornberrys (#4), Punch-Drunk Love (#13)
7	February 16, 2003	Two Weeks Notice	£2,189,331	Daredevil (#2), Treasure Planet (#5), The Hours (#8), Undercover Brother (#11)
8	February 23, 2003	The Ring	£2,200,084	
9	March 2, 2003	The Ring	£1,692,154	Jackass: The Movie (#2), Analyze That (#6), Solaris (#12), Adaptation (#14)
10	March 9, 2003	Maid in Manhattan	£2,424,584	Far from Heaven (#7)
11	March 16, 2003	Maid in Manhattan	£1,281,755	The Life of David Gale (#2), Equilibrium (#4), Confessions of a Dangerous Mind (#6), Barbershop (#14)
12	March 23, 2003	Just Married	£973,469	National Security (#4), Evelyn (#6)
13	March 30, 2003	The Recruit	£923,834	The Core (#3), Cradle 2 the Grave (#5), The Rules of Attraction (#7)
14	April 6, 2003	The Recruit	£770,014	Shanghai Knights (#2), A Man Apart (#3), Blue Crush (#4)
15	April 13, 2003	Johnny English	£3,435,342	The Jungle Book 2 (#2), S Club Seeing Double (#5)
16	April 20, 2003	Johnny English	£2,529,665	Phone Booth (#2), How to Lose a Guy in 10 Days (#3), Bulletproof Monk (#5), Ghosts of the Abyss (#12)
17	April 27, 2003	Johnny English	£2,279,100	Dreamcatcher (#5), Welcome to Collinwood (#6), 25th Hour (#9)
18	May 4, 2003	X2	£7,037,861	The Heart of Me (#12), Half Past Dead (#13)
19	May 11, 2003	X2	£3,079,985	Old School (#2), Darkness Falls (#4), Hope Springs (#7), I Capture the Castle (#9)
20	May 18, 2003	X2	£2,115,011	Kangaroo Jack (#2), The Actors (#9), Secretary (#10)
21	May 25, 2003	The Matrix Reloaded	£12,165,276	The Hot Chick (#6), Andaaz (#12)
22	June 1, 2003	The Matrix Reloaded	£3,783,905	Bringing Down the House (#2), Ripley's Game (#5)
23	June 8, 2003	The Matrix Reloaded	£2,485,938	Anger Management (#2), The Hunted (#4)
24	June 15, 2003	The Matrix Reloaded	£1,071,551	
25	June 22, 2003	2 Fast 2 Furious	£2,747,875	
26	June 29, 2003	Bruce Almighty	£7,260,467	
27	July 6, 2003	Charlie's Angels: Full Throttle	£3,273,078	
28	July 13, 2003	Charlie's Angels: Full Throttle	£1,581,273	
29	July 20, 2003	Hulk	£3,529,440	
30	July 27, 2003	Hulk	£1,384,426	
31	August 3, 2003	Terminator 3: Rise of the Machines	£6,080,369	
32	August 10, 2003	Pirates of the Caribbean: The Curse of the Black Pearl	£3,765,450	
33	August 17, 2003	American Wedding	£4,151,788	
34	August 24, 2003	American Wedding	£2,180,783	
35	August 31, 2003	Pirates of the Caribbean: The Curse of the Black Pearl	£2,037,014	
36	September 7, 2003	Pirates of the Caribbean: The Curse of the Black Pearl	£1,542,745	
37	September 14, 2003	Calendar Girls	£1,762,505	
38	September 21, 2003	The Italian Job	£2,294,027	
39	September 28, 2003	Calendar Girls	£1,761,985	
40	October 5, 2003	Bad Boys II	£3,175,258	
41	October 12, 2003	Finding Nemo †	£7,381,962	
42	October 19, 2003	Finding Nemo †	£5,923,138	
43	October 26, 2003	Finding Nemo †	£3,887,996	
44	November 2, 2003	Finding Nemo †	£3,393,575	
45	November 9, 2003	The Matrix Revolutions	£8,712,350	
46	November 16, 2003	The Matrix Revolutions	£2,575,595	
47	November 23, 2003	Love Actually	£6,657,479	
48	November 30, 2003	Love Actually	£4,660,595	
49	December 7, 2003	Love Actually	£3,202,417	
50	December 14, 2003	Love Actually	£2,273,706	
51	December 21, 2003	The Lord of the Rings: The Return of the King	£15,021,761	
52	December 28, 2003	The Lord of the Rings: The Return of the King	£7,149,427	

== See also ==
- List of British films — British films by year

Preceded by 2002	2003	Succeeded by 2004
