= North Square =

- DVD cover
- Created by: Peter Moffat
- Starring: Phil Davis; Helen McCrory; Kevin McKidd; Rupert Penry-Jones; Kim Vithana; Dominic Rowan; Victoria Smurfit; Ruth Millar; Tony Monroe; Sasha Behar; James Murray; James Midgeley
- Country of origin: United Kingdom
- Original language: English
- No. of series: 1
- No. of episodes: 10 (list of episodes)

Production
- Running time: 50 minutes
- Production company: Company Pictures

Original release
- Network: Channel 4
- Release: 18 October – 20 December 2000

North Square is a British television drama series written and created by Peter Moffat, and broadcast by Channel 4 from 18 October to 20 December 2000. Starring an ensemble cast, including Phil Davis, Rupert Penry-Jones, Helen McCrory and Kevin McKidd, the programme is set around the practice of a barristers' chambers in Leeds. The series was filmed in and around the real life Park Square, Leeds. This is the area in the city where the majority of barristers' chambers are concentrated.

Despite gaining considerable critical acclaim, the show failed to garner a substantial audience resulting in only the one series of ten episodes being produced. In Australia, the series was broadcast in 2001 on ABC and repeated in 2004 after popular and critical acclaim. The full series was released on DVD for the first time by Acorn Media UK on 5 March 2012.

== Synopsis ==
North Square is a British drama about a group of young, irreverent barristers all hoping to make their mark in the legal profession at a defence chambers in Leeds, West Yorkshire. They are all under the leadership of their Machiavellian chief clerk Peter McLeish (Phil Davis), who is clever and obsessed by work and doesn't appear to have a social life. He's struggling to make this new enterprise work and will do anything to make it succeed and beat his archrival, Michael Marlowe (Tony Monroe), from whom he left, taking the best barristers with him. He establishes relationships with the top criminals in Leeds so he can get their best cases. He is not above persuading a client to offer a plea, not because it's in their best interests but because he doesn't want to miss out on a bigger case coming up.

Early in the series, Rose (Helen McCrory) and Billy (Kevin McKidd) give birth to a baby boy and Rose comes back to work four days later. Billy is on an assault charge for defending Wendy De Souza (Kim Vithana), their head of chambers, whom another barrister, Leo Wilson (who works for Marlowe's chambers), claimed only got to her position because of her skin colour and is suspended but then cleared. However, Marlowe continues to ask Billy to come back to his chambers which he refuses to do and he instructs the case to go to trial. Morag Black (Ruth Millar) is a new pupil at chambers, taken under the wing of Rose, and is used as a scapegoat to represent cases for Peter while he gives more high-profile cases to other barristers. Johnny Boy (James Murray) begins a relationship with Morag, however, Peter is against the relationship and instructs them both to end it. Later on, Hussein Ali (Robert Mountford), another pupil, also joins chambers under the guidance of Tom Mitford (Dominic Rowan), yet there is only one new place in chambers available. Peter supports Hussein as he believes he will bring in business because he's a British Asian. At the end of the series the decision of who should stay in chambers goes to Hussein, however Peter tells Morag that she can "squat" in their chambers.

Alex Hay (Rupert Penry-Jones), the golden boy of Peter McLeish, is a smooth, good-looking barrister with a city centre apartment and a relationship with Dr. Helen Ferryhough (Victoria Smurfit). But Peter is working with solicitor Stevie Goode (Sasha Behar), who can bring business to chambers away from Marlowe, and believes Helen is not strong enough for Alex so pushes Stevie and Alex together for the good of chambers. They embark on an affair, unaware that Peter is pulling the strings; using their relationship to secure big clients from Stevie. After a tip-off from Peter to Helen, she and Alex split up and Helen embarks on a relationship with Tom Mitford. At the end of the series, Alex begs Helen to come back to him and it is unknown whether Helen leaves Tom for Alex. John is the nephew of Peter McLeish and starts work as a trainee at chambers but due to the confusion of his name with his colleague, Johnny Boy, Peter tells him that he is now known as Bob to the rest of chambers. No one except Johnny Boy knows of their kinship, Peter admitting he has been installed "as his eyes and ears" of chambers.

Throughout the series there is an underlying story of Wendy De Souza, who happens to be having an affair with Judge Martin Bould, applying to be QC. She does not succeed in getting the position. Marlowe finds out about the affair and asks Billy to confirm it, stating that if he does the trial will be dropped. Billy confirms this to Marlowe which results in the trial being dropped but Peter is suspicious as to why. He eventually learns from Billy about his admission and advises Judge Martin to end his affair with Wendy De Souza. Billy tells Rose about what he has done and she is in despair about how Peter is controlling everybody's personal lives, how Wendy was betrayed and why Billy would go to Peter and not her. Plus, she is against Peter's dealings with criminals to secure work. At the same time, Alex learns from Helen that it was Peter who told her about his affair with Stevie. At this point, Rose lobbies the team to have Peter removed but in the end she gets no support and decides to leave chambers. However, Peter asks her to do one more case; represent his son, whom he has had no dealings with for 18 years, on a drugs charge. She manages to secure a "Not Guilty" verdict. At the end of the last episode, Rose walks back into chambers as the rest of the team are celebrating their one-year anniversary as a chambers.

== Cast ==
- Phil Davis - Peter McLeish
- Helen McCrory - Rose Fitzgerald
- Kevin McKidd - Billy Guthrie
- Rupert Penry-Jones - Alex Hay
- Kim Vithana - Wendy De Souza
- Sasha Behar – Stevie Goode
- Ruth Millar – Morag Black
- Dominic Rowan – Tom Mitford
- James Murray – Johnny Boy
- James Midgeley – John "Bob" Mayfield
- Victoria Smurfit – Dr. Helen Ferryhough
- Robert Mountford – Hussein Ali
- Tony Monroe – Michael Marlowe
- Murray Head – Judge Martin Bould
- Jack Fortune – Leo Wilson

== Episode list ==
No.	Title	Directed by	Written by	Original release date	Viewers (millions)
1	"Just Another Day"	Philippa Langdale	Peter Moffatt & Simon Block	18 October 2000	N/A
Alex and Billy are drawn into a fight in court over a racist slur by a client, while Peter works with trainee barrister Morag over a tricky bail application for a notorious criminal.
2	"For Those Who Wait"	Tim Fywell	Peter Moffatt & Simon Block	25 October 2000	N/A
Rose returns to work after giving birth just three days ago, while Billy stays at home and waits for his verdict.
3	"Volcano"	Tim Leandro	Peter Moffatt & Simon Block	1 November 2000	N/A
Billy hits a rival in court while defending two armed robbers. Rose struggles to manage a busy career and being a mother.
4	"The Good 'Ol Insanity Defence"	Tim Leandro	Peter Moffatt & Simon Block	8 November 2000	N/A
A local crime boss has been charged with murder, but he has some novel suggestions for his defence, but his team doesn't want to use them. McLeish hires Hussein Ali making Morag's future uncertain.
5	"Claws Out"	Tim Leandro	Peter Moffatt & Simon Block	15 November 2000	N/A
McLeish assigns Billy a case to keep his mind off his upcoming criminal trial, and Tom has his sights set on Alex's ex.
6	"As Time Ticks By"	Philippa Langdale	Peter Moffatt & Simon Block	22 November 2000	N/A
Billy and Rose disagree over the case of a Colombian drug runner, while Billy struggles knowing that his trial is looming.
7	"Malicia"	Nigel Douglas	Peter Moffatt & Simon Block	29 November 2000	N/A
Marlowe threatens to leak Wendy's affair to the chambers – and the press – unless Billy tends his immediate resignation.
8	"Winning and Losing"	Nigel Douglas	Peter Moffatt & Simon Block	6 December 2000	N/A
Rose's day goes from bad to worse when a trial she is working on becomes the subject of unwanted press attention.
9	"The Big Cheese"	Nigel Douglas	Peter Moffatt & Simon Block	13 December 2000	N/A
Rose decides to challenge McLeish's authority, which threatens to have devastating consequences for the chambers.
10	"Quadrophenia"	Nigel Douglas	Peter Moffatt & Simon Block	20 December 2000	N/A
Big changes being brought into motion threaten to cause upheaval for all employees of the chambers.

== Awards ==
- BAFTA Television Awards 2001 – Best Editing (Fiction/Entertainment) – Jon Costelloe
- Broadcasting Press Guild Awards 2001

- Best Drama Series/Serial
- Best Actor – Phil Davis
- Best Actress – Helen McCrory
- Writer's Award – Peter Moffat (shared with Simon Schama for A History of Britain)

Davis was also nominated for Best Actor at the 2001 Royal Television Society Awards.
