= Basic Instinct =

1992 film by Paul Verhoeven

- Theatrical release poster
- Directed by: Paul Verhoeven
- Written by: Joe Eszterhas
- Produced by: Alan Marshall; Mario Kassar
- Starring: Michael Douglas; Sharon Stone; George Dzundza; Jeanne Tripplehorn; Wayne Knight
- Cinematography: Jan de Bont
- Edited by: Frank J. Urioste
- Music by: Jerry Goldsmith
- Production companies: Carolco Pictures; Le Studio Canal+
- Distributed by: TriStar Pictures (United States); Guild Film Distribution (United Kingdom); UGC Distribution (France)
- Release dates: March 18, 1992 (Los Angeles); March 20, 1992 (United States); May 8, 1992 (France and United Kingdom)
- Running time: 128 minutes
- Countries: United States; United Kingdom; France
- Language: English
- Budget: $49 million
- Box office: $353 million

Basic Instinct is a 1992 erotic thriller mystery film directed by Paul Verhoeven and written by Joe Eszterhas. Starring Michael Douglas, Sharon Stone, George Dzundza, Jeanne Tripplehorn, and Wayne Knight, the film follows San Francisco homicide detective Nick Curran (Douglas) as he investigates the murder of rock star Johnny Boz, only to begin an intense relationship with the prime suspect Catherine Tramell (Stone), a wealthy heiress and crime novelist.

The script was developed by Eszterhas in the 1980s and became the subject of a bidding war, which Carolco Pictures won before bringing Verhoeven on board to direct. Stone, who was relatively unknown at the time, was cast as Tramell after the role was rejected by several prominent actresses and production was plagued by protests and intense conflict between Eszterhas and Verhoeven.

Basic Instinct premiered in Los Angeles on March 18, 1992, and was theatrically released by TriStar Pictures in the United States two days later. The film received mixed reviews from critics; while praise was given to the performances, score, and editing, the script and character development were criticized. It also generated controversy due to its graphic depiction of violence and homosexual relationships. Despite public protest, it was a commercial success, grossing $353 million against its $49 million production budget, becoming the fourth highest grossing film of 1992. Due to its success and controversy, it inspired many imitators and has been labeled as "perhaps the quintessential erotic thriller of the 1990s".

The film was followed by the sequel Basic Instinct 2 (2006), which starred Stone but was made without the involvement of Verhoeven or Douglas. It received negative reviews and was relatively unsuccessful.

== Plot ==
In San Francisco, a blonde woman ties retired rock star Johnny Boz to a bed with a silk scarf during sex, then stabs him to death with an ice pick. SFPD Detective Nick Curran and his partner, Gus Moran, investigate the murder. The prime suspect is Boz's girlfriend, crime novelist Catherine Tramell, whose latest novel mirrors the details of the killing.

Catherine is uncooperative with the investigators, taunting them by smoking during questioning and exposing herself. Though released for lack of evidence, she becomes a person of interest when Nick learns that she has a history of close relationships with violent individuals. These include her girlfriend Roxanne "Roxy" Hardy, who killed her younger brothers as a teenager, and Hazel Dobkins, a convicted family murderer.

Nick, a recovering alcoholic with a history of drug abuse and a prior incident in which he accidentally shot two tourists, attends mandatory counseling with police psychologist Dr. Elisabeth Garner, with whom he has an unstable romantic relationship. He discovers that Catherine is using him as the inspiration for a new character—a detective who is murdered after falling for the wrong woman. When Nick suspects that his confidential psychiatric file has been leaked, he assaults internal affairs lieutenant Marty Nilsen, who had access to the file. Nilsen is later found murdered and Nick is placed on administrative leave.

At Boz's nightclub, Nick sees Catherine and Roxy using cocaine. Later, at Catherine's home, she ties Nick to the bed during sex while Roxy watches. Moran expresses concern about Nick's involvement with Catherine and uncovers that Nilsen received a $50,000 payment months before Nick met her.

Roxy attempts to kill Nick in a car attack but dies in the ensuing crash. Catherine reveals that she had an intense relationship with a woman in college who became obsessed with her. Nick suspects the woman was Garner, who claims the obsession went the other way. Investigating further, Nick finds that Nilsen had withdrawn a complaint Catherine filed against Garner years earlier. He also uncovers that a professor shared by Garner and Catherine was killed with an ice pick in an unsolved case resembling Catherine's fiction, and that Garner's former husband was murdered in another unresolved case investigated by Nilsen.

Nick finds the draft of Catherine's new novel, which depicts a detective discovering his partner's body in an elevator. Catherine abruptly ends their relationship. Later, Moran tells Nick he has arranged to meet Catherine's former college roommate in Oakland to learn more about her and Garner. When Nick arrives, he finds Moran stabbed to death with an ice pick in an elevator, mirroring the novel. Garner arrives shortly afterward, claiming she was lured there by a message. Believing she is reaching for a weapon, Nick shoots and kills her but she is found to be unarmed.

Police find evidence in Garner's apartment implicating her in multiple murders, including files and photographs related to Catherine. Nick is left confused and emotionally shaken. Later, Catherine returns to Nick's apartment and they have sex. As they lie in bed discussing their future, an ice pick lies unseen beneath the bed.

== Cast ==
- Michael Douglas as SFPD Police Detective Nick Curran
- Sharon Stone as Catherine Tramell
- George Dzundza as Detective Gus Moran
- Jeanne Tripplehorn as Dr. Elisabeth Garner
- Denis Arndt as Lieutenant Phillip Walker
- Leilani Sarelle as Roxanne "Roxy" Hardy
- Bruce A. Young as Det. Sam Andrews
- Chelcie Ross as Captain Talcott
- Wayne Knight as District Attorney John Correli
- Daniel von Bargen as Lieutenant Marty Nilsen
- Stephen Tobolowsky as Dr. Lamott
- Benjamin Mouton as Harrigan
- Dorothy Malone as Hazel Dobkins
- Jack McGee as Sheriff
- Bill Cable as Johnny Boz
- James Rebhorn as Dr. McElwaine
- Mitch Pileggi as Internal Affairs Investigator

== Production ==
The screenplay, which was written in the 1980s, sparked a bidding war until it was finally purchased by Carolco Pictures for US$3 million. Joe Eszterhas, who had previously been the creative force behind several blockbuster films such as Flashdance (1983) and Jagged Edge (1985), managed to complete the script in just 13 days. However, Paul Verhoeven had suggested changes to the script that Eszterhas strongly disagreed with, including a lesbian sex scene that Eszterhas deemed "exploitative". With Verhoeven unwilling to budge, Eszterhas and producer Irwin Winkler left the production.

Gary Goldman was subsequently brought on board to rewrite the script four times at Verhoeven's suggestion. However, by the fourth draft, Verhoeven himself acknowledged that his proposals were "undramatic" and "really stupid". By the fifth and final draft, the script had returned to Eszterhas' original vision, with only minor tweaks to visuals and dialogue. As a result, Eszterhas received sole writing credit for the film. In preparation for the car chase scene, Michael Douglas drove up the steps on Kearny Street in San Francisco for four nights by himself.

The home of Sharon Stone's character Catherine Tramell, prominently featured in the film, is said to be in Stinson Beach, California, just north of San Francisco. The scenes were shot at a mansion near Carmel-by-the-Sea, about 120 miles (190 km) south of San Francisco. The property had been previously owned by the late adventurer Steve Fossett and his wife Peggy Viehland until her death in 2017. In 2018, the residence was purchased by software engineer Gary Vickers, who combined it into an estate with four adjoining cottages he also owned; he put the entire property on sale the following year for $52.4 million. By 2022, the asking price had been lowered to $29.6 million.

=== Casting ===
After numerous actors turned down the lead role of Nick Curran, Carolco worried they would not be able to cast a suitable male lead. CAA's agent Ronald Meyer called Carolco and said that he knew the script had been turned down by actors; Meyer said Michael Douglas would agree to star in the film if Carolco could meet his salary requirement and Carolco quickly agreed. Douglas was cast in the project early on. He recommended Kim Basinger for the role of Catherine Tramell, but she declined. He also suggested Julia Roberts, Greta Scacchi and Meg Ryan but they all turned down the role. Debra Winger, Michelle Pfeiffer, Geena Davis, Kathleen Turner, Kelly Lynch, Ellen Barkin and Mariel Hemingway all turned down the role as well when offered by Verhoeven and the producers.

Verhoeven considered Demi Moore but ultimately chose Sharon Stone, with whom he had previously worked on Total Recall. Verhoeven had been particularly struck by the way she quickly transitioned from evil to love in a couple of seconds before her character Lori Quaid's death in that film. Stone wanted the role but the studio refused to send her the script, until her manager broke into the studio's office locker to give her the script. Verhoeven tested with Stone as Douglas first refused to test with her. Verhoeven kept playing her test after testing everyone else and Douglas later agreed to test with Stone after 12 other actresses turned down the role. Douglas was initially upset that the relatively unknown Stone was cast in the role, determined to have another A-list actress star in the movie with him. Worried about taking the risk on his own, he said, "I need someone to share the risks of this movie. [...] I don't want to be up there all by myself. There's going to be a lot of shit flying around." He later remarked that "we had a fabulous actress in Sharon. She was just perfect for the role". Stone also suspected that a heated argument between Douglas and herself at a Cannes Film Festival party sometime earlier was a contributing factor. Ultimately, Stone was paid $500,000 for her role, while Douglas received $14 million.

The movie was the last screen appearance of Dorothy Malone.

== Music ==
=== Soundtrack ===
Professional ratings
Review scores
Source	Rating
Filmtracks	link

The musical score for Basic Instinct was composed by Jerry Goldsmith and earned him nominations for an Academy Award and a Golden Globe Award. Goldsmith described the process as challenging, stating, "Basic Instinct was probably the most difficult [score] I've ever done. It's a very convoluted story with very unorthodox characters. It's a murder mystery, but it isn't really a murder mystery. The director, Paul Verhoeven, had a very clear idea of how the woman should be, and I had a hard time getting it. Because of Paul pushing me, I think it's one of the best scores I've ever written. It was a true collaboration."

In terms of featured music, commercially released tracks played a minor role in the film. The club scene prominently features "Blue" by Chicago house music performer LaTour and "Rave the Rhythm" by the group Channel X, as well as "Movin' on Up" by Jeff Barry and Ja'Net DuBois. Chris Rea's "Looking for the Summer" is heard during a scene between Nick and his partner Gus Moran (George Dzundza) at Mac's Diner.

The film's official soundtrack was released on March 17, 1992. In 2004, Prometheus Records issued an expanded version of Goldsmith's score, which included previously omitted sections and alternative compositions for certain elements.

== Release ==
=== Theatrical ===
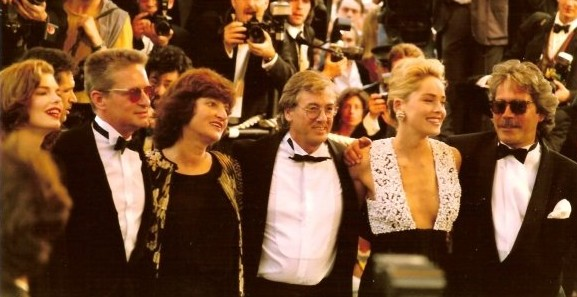
Jeanne Tripplehorn, Michael Douglas, Martine Tours (wife of Verhoeven), Paul Verhoeven, Sharon Stone and Mario Kassar at the 1992 Cannes Film Festival

The film opened in North American theatres in March 1992, and after being entered into the 1992 Cannes Film Festival continued on to a worldwide release.

=== MPAA rating ===
Basic Instinct is rated R for "strong violence and sensuality, and for drug use and language". Initially, the film was given an NC-17 rating by the MPAA for "graphic depictions of extremely explicit violence, sexual content and strong language". However, under pressure from TriStar and Carolco, Verhoeven cut 35 to 40 seconds from the film to achieve an R rating. Verhoeven described the changes in a March 1992 article in The New York Times:

Actually, I didn't have to cut many things, but I replaced things from different angles, made it a little more elliptical, a bit less direct.

=== Home media ===
The theatrical release of the film was cut by 35 to 40 seconds to avoid an NC-17 rating, with some violence and sexually explicit content removed. The missing or censored material, later released on video and DVD as the director's cut, included:

- The murder of Johnny Boz (Bill Cable) in the opening scene. In the director's cut, the killer is seen stabbing him in his neck, in the chest and through his nose. In addition, the killer is still having violent sex with him while stabbing him at the same time.
- The scene where Nick rapes Beth Garner (Jeanne Tripplehorn) is cut in the US theatrical version. He is seen ripping off her clothes and forcing her over the couch, before a cut to the two of them lying on the floor. In the uncut version, she verbally tells him to stop and says 'no' multiple times.
- The scene where Nick and Catherine have sex after going to the club is longer and much more explicit in the uncut version.

In 2021, StudioCanal released a restored 4K Ultra HD collector's edition of the film on Blu-ray, DVD, and digital download in the UK (June 14), Australia (July 7), and New Zealand (July 14). The restoration was supervised by the director and completed in 2019–2020, using the original 35 mm negative. Additionally, a new documentary titled Basic Instinct, Sex, Death & Stone was added as a special feature.

== Reception ==
=== Box office ===
Basic Instinct opened in theaters in the United States and Canada on March 20, 1992, and became one of the highest-grossing films of that year. It debuted at number one at the US box office, grossing $15 million in its opening weekend. After briefly dropping down the charts, it returned to number one in its fifth week, where it remained for four weeks. In total, the film grossed $117.7 million in the United States and Canada. Internationally, it grossed $352,927,224, making it the fourth-highest-grossing film released in 1992 worldwide. In Italy, it had a record opening of $5.44 million and remained number one for four weeks, ultimately grossing $20 million and becoming the highest-grossing film for the year. It was the highest-grossing film in Spain of all time, with a gross of $21.6 million, and in the United Kingdom, it was number one for three weeks and the highest-grossing film for the year with a gross of £15.5 million. It was also number one for the year in France ($27 million), Germany (4.5 million admissions), South Africa ($3 million), Iceland, and Ireland. In Australia, it was number one for three weeks and the second-highest-grossing film for the year, grossing A$13.1 million.

=== Critical response ===
Basic Instinct's critical reaction was mixed. On the review aggregator website Rotten Tomatoes, 56% of 79 critics' reviews are positive, with an average rating of 6.2/10. The website's consensus reads: "Unevenly echoing the work of Alfred Hitchcock, Basic Instinct contains a star-making performance from Sharon Stone but is ultimately undone by its problematic, overly lurid plot." On Metacritic the film holds a score of 43 based on 28 critics, indicating "mixed or average" reviews. Audiences polled by CinemaScore gave the film an average grade of "B+" on an A+ to F scale.

Janet Maslin of The New York Times praised the film, saying "Basic Instinct transfers Mr. Verhoeven's flair for action-oriented material to the realm of Hitchcockian intrigue, and the results are viscerally effective even when they don't make sense." Peter Travers of Rolling Stone also praised the film, saying it was a guilty pleasure film; he also expressed admiration for Verhoeven's direction, saying his "cinematic wet dream delivers the goods, especially when Sharon Stone struts on with enough come-on carnality to singe the screen," and praised Stone's performance: "Stone, a former model, is a knockout; she even got a rise out of Arnold Schwarzenegger in Verhoeven's Total Recall. But being the bright spot in too many dull movies (He Said, She Said; Irreconcilable Differences) stalled her career. Though Basic Instinct establishes Stone as a bombshell for the Nineties, it also shows she can nail a laugh or shade an emotion with equal aplomb."

Australian critic Shannon J. Harvey of the Sunday Times called it one of the "1990s['] finest productions, doing more for female empowerment than any feminist rally. Stone—in her star-making performance—is as hot and sexy as she is ice-pick cold."

The film had many detractors. Roger Ebert of the Chicago Sun-Times awarded it two out of four stars, saying the film was well crafted but died down in the last half-hour: "The film is like a crossword puzzle. It keeps your interest until you solve it. Then it's just a worthless scrap with the spaces filled in." Dave Kehr of the Chicago Tribune also gave a negative review, calling it psychologically empty: "Verhoeven does not explore the dark side, but merely exploits it, and that makes all the difference in the world."

=== Controversy ===
==== Initial ====
I had no pressure from anybody, not from Carolco, not from Tri-Star, not from anybody to change anything about the so-called gay issue. I did it the way I wanted. I was, you might say, politically correct. The gay characters are positive. And the reaction is totally unwarranted. Have they seen the film? No. They read the script. They read the script like fundamentalists read the bible. They could not visualize the film.
— Paul Verhoeven on the film's controversy before release

After the script was made available to gay rights activist groups in 1990, concerns arose as to the film's depiction of homosexual relationships and the portrayal of a bisexual woman as a murderous psychopath. Activists claimed that the film followed a pattern of negative depictions and stereotypes of homosexuals in film. While Eszterhas was open to addressing these concerns, Verhoeven, Douglas and producer Alan Marshall rejected the changes, claiming that they "undermined" Eszterhas' script and "lessen the integrity of the picture." Upon resuming filming in San Francisco in late April 1991, gay and lesbian rights activists and demonstrators attended, and the San Francisco Police Department's riot police were present at every location to manage the crowds. Protesters outside the filming locations held signs that said "Honk if you love the 49ers" and "Honk if you love men." On April 29, Marshall ordered a citizen's arrest and personally identified each protester he wanted arrested. However, this did not result in any action by the local police department.

Protesters outside a theater in Philadelphia on the film's opening night

Members of the lesbian and bisexual activist group LABIA protested against the film on its opening night. Others also picketed theatres to dissuade people from attending screenings, carrying signs saying "Kiss My Ice Pick", "Hollywood Promotes Anti-Gay Violence" and "Catherine Did It!"/"Save Your Money—The Bisexual Did It". Verhoeven himself defended the groups' right to protest, but criticized the disruptions they caused, saying "Fascism is not in raising your voice; the fascism is in not accepting the no."

Six protestors disrupted the filming of Saturday Night Live on April 11, 1992, while Stone was hosting. The protestors attempted to rush the stage but they were apprehended by security; two women and four men were arrested and charged with disorderly conduct and harassment. The live version of Stone's interrupted monologue was replaced in repeat broadcasts with footage from the dress rehearsal.

Film critic Roger Ebert mentioned the controversy in his review, saying "As for the allegedly offensive homosexual characters: The movie's protesters might take note of the fact that this film's heterosexuals, starting with Douglas, are equally offensive. Still, there is a point to be made about Hollywood's unremitting insistence on typecasting homosexuals—particularly lesbians—as twisted and evil." Camille Paglia denounced the gay activist and feminist protests against Basic Instinct and called Sharon Stone's performance "one of the great performances by a woman in screen history", praising her character as "a great vamp figure, like Mona Lisa herself, like a pagan goddess."

Women's rights groups also protested the film over its negative depiction of women and a brutal rape scene, with a branch of The National Organization for Women calling the film "the most blatantly misogynistic film in recent memory." Its Los Angeles branch president at the time claimed the movie sent a message "that women like violence, women like to be used, women like to be raped." The film was also criticized for glamorizing cigarette smoking. Screenwriter Joe Eszterhas was later diagnosed with throat cancer and publicly apologized for glamorizing smoking in his films.

In 1992, in Les Herbiers, France, the mayor Jeanne Briand banned the movie in her municipality, claiming that this movie was "apologism for crime and violence, which exacerbates impulses that can lead to rape."

==== Renewed ====
Stone has alleged multiple times that a scene in which her vulva was exposed as she crossed her legs was filmed without her knowledge. She said she was told that her lack of underwear would only be alluded to and not shown. She had been wearing white underwear until Verhoeven said it reflected light on the camera lens and asked her to remove it, assuring her that only a shadow would be visible. She said it was not until she saw the film in a screening room with a test audience that she became aware of the visible nudity, leading her to slap Verhoeven in the face and leave the screening.

In her 2021 memoir, Stone again stated that she was misled by Verhoeven with regard to the circumstance of the filming of the scene, even though she ultimately did not seek an injunction against it. Verhoeven responded that it was "impossible" and "she knew exactly what we were doing." However, despite having a "radically different" memory about the particular scene, he praised Stone's performance and said they are on good terms. In a 1998 Inside the Actors Studio interview, Stone said that while she was initially angry, she realized Verhoeven's decision was the right one, saying, "And I thought about it for a few days and I knew in my heart, he was right. I hated that it existed, I hated it more that he stole it from me instead of allowing me to choose. But he was right."

In a 1993 Entertainment Weekly interview, Jeanne Tripplehorn stated that the notorious "brutal, bruising sex" between her and Douglas' character was somewhat "lighter" when described to her by Verhoeven before shooting.

During the trial for Luka Magnotta for the murder of Jun Lin, the prosecution stated that Magnotta stabbed Lin to death with a screwdriver painted silver in order to resemble the ice pick used by Stone's character, Catherine Tramell. Magnotta had also used the alias 'Kirk Trammel' [sic], after Stone's character, and during interrogation falsely claimed the existence of a criminal associate named 'Manny', after Catherine Trammell's unseen fiancé Manny Vasquez.

=== Accolades ===
Award	Category	Recipients	Result
Academy Awards	Best Film Editing	Frank J. Urioste	Nominated
Academy Awards	Best Original Score	Jerry Goldsmith	Nominated
BMI Film & TV Awards	Film Music Award	Jerry Goldsmith	Won
Cannes Film Festival	Palme d'Or	Paul Verhoeven	Nominated
Chicago Film Critics Association Awards	Best Actress	Sharon Stone	Nominated
DVD Exclusive Awards	Best Original Retrospective Documentary	Jeffrey Schwarz	Nominated
Golden Globe Awards	Best Actress in a Motion Picture – Drama	Sharon Stone	Nominated
Golden Globe Awards	Best Original Score – Motion Picture	Jerry Goldsmith	Nominated
Golden Raspberry Awards	Worst Actor	Michael Douglas (also for Shining Through)	Nominated
Golden Raspberry Awards	Worst Supporting Actress	Jeanne Tripplehorn	Nominated
Golden Raspberry Awards	Worst New Star	Sharon Stone's tribute to Theodore Cleaver	Nominated
Golden Screen Awards			Won
Japan Academy Film Prize	Outstanding Foreign Language Film		Nominated
MTV Movie Awards	Best Movie		Nominated
MTV Movie Awards	Best Male Performance	Michael Douglas	Nominated
MTV Movie Awards	Best Female Performance	Sharon Stone	Won
MTV Movie Awards	Most Desirable Female	Sharon Stone	Won
MTV Movie Awards	Best Villain	Sharon Stone	Nominated
MTV Movie Awards	Best On-Screen Duo	Michael Douglas and Sharon Stone	Nominated
Nikkan Sports Film Awards	Best Foreign Film		Won
Saturn Awards	Best Horror Film		Nominated
Saturn Awards	Best Director	Paul Verhoeven	Nominated
Saturn Awards	Best Writing	Joe Eszterhas	Nominated
Saturn Awards	Best Actress	Sharon Stone	Nominated
Saturn Awards	Best Music	Jerry Goldsmith	Nominated

== Sequel ==
A sequel titled Basic Instinct 2 was released in 2006.

== Reboot ==
In July 2025, it was announced that Amazon MGM Studios' label United Artists, headed by Scott Stuber, had paid $2 million to buy rights to a currently untitled reboot of the film, with Eszterhas returning to write the script.

In August 2025, Sharon Stone said she was not involved with the project and questioned the need for a reboot, telling US TV’s Today: "I don't know why you'd do it ... good luck," and later adding that "there's not going to be a Basic Instinct reboot."

In April 2026, Eszterhas claimed that Emerald Fennell was in negotiations to direct the film. A spokesperson for Amazon would later deny Fennell's involvement, along with several of Fennell's reps. However, later in July, Eszterhas said that he would write the reboot himself and it would include Catherine Tramell and a new character in her daughter Jezebel.

== See also ==
- Fatal Attraction, a 1987 film, also starring Douglas, exploring similar themes
- Fatal Instinct, a 1993 film parody
- The Fourth Man (1983 film), an earlier film by Verhoeven that bears similarities to Basic Instinct
- Murder of Jun Lin, a murder case influenced by Basic Instinct
