= Kim Vithana =

British actress (born 1970)

- Born: 4 June 1970 (age 54); Nottingham, Nottinghamshire, England
- Occupation: Actress

Kim Vithana (born 4 June 1970) is a British actress.

She had acted in television serials Family Pride, Specials and Firm Friends when the filmmaker Gurinder Chadha took her in Bhaji on the Beach to play the role of Ginder, a girl of Punjabi origin in England. The film brought her much recognition.

Vithana has worked mainly in television production. Among other roles, she is known for playing an Oriental Princess in The Phoenix and the Carpet (1997), Rosie Sattar in the television series Holby City from 2003 to 2005, Mike Baldwin's feisty solicitor Frances "Frankie" Stillman (from 1997 to 1998) and Dr Bannerjee/Saira Habeeb in Coronation Street, and Yvonne in Always and Everyone. She has also appeared in Casualty, EastEnders, Cracker, Love Hurts, Dangerfield and North Square. In 2003 she played Beth Downing in "Multistorey", a two-part episode of Waking the Dead.

Vithana has also worked on the Silver Street radio programme on the BBC Asian Network.

in 1994, Vithana gave birth to a son, Jake, who is a screenwriter and producer.
