= List of 2002 box office number-one films in the United Kingdom =

This is a list of films which have placed number one at the weekend box office in the United Kingdom during 2002.

== Number-one films ==
†	This implies the highest-grossing movie of the year.

#	Weekend End Date	Film	Box Office	Notes
1	6 January 2002	The Lord of the Rings: The Fellowship of the Ring	£5,967,910	
2	13 January 2002	The Lord of the Rings: The Fellowship of the Ring	£4,371,354	
3	20 January 2002	The Lord of the Rings: The Fellowship of the Ring	£3,276,912	
4	27 January 2002	Vanilla Sky	£2,978,264	
5	3 February 2002	Vanilla Sky	£1,743,556	
6	10 February 2002	Monsters, Inc.	£9,200,257	
7	17 February 2002	Monsters, Inc.	£5,757,712	
8	24 February 2002	Monsters, Inc.	£4,234,293	
9	3 March 2002	Ocean's Eleven	£2,623,689	Ocean's Eleven reached number one in its third week of release
10	10 March 2002	Ocean's Eleven	£1,850,350	
11	17 March 2002	Ocean's Eleven	£1,357,063	
12	24 March 2002	Ali G Indahouse	£3,231,673	
13	31 March 2002	Blade II	£2,540,226	
14	7 April 2002	Blade II	£1,335,594	
15	14 April 2002	Bend It Like Beckham	£2,001,795	
16	21 April 2002	Bend It Like Beckham	£1,721,146	
17	28 April 2002	About a Boy	£3,747,966	
18	5 May 2002	About a Boy	£2,239,288	
19	12 May 2002	About a Boy	£1,521,312	
20	19 May 2002	Star Wars: Episode II – Attack of the Clones	£11,386,209	
21	26 May 2002	Star Wars: Episode II – Attack of the Clones	£5,955,017	
22	2 June 2002	Star Wars: Episode II – Attack of the Clones	£2,442,698	
23	9 June 2002	Star Wars: Episode II – Attack of the Clones	£2,058,716	
24	16 June 2002	Spider-Man	£9,426,969	
25	23 June 2002	Spider-Man	£4,255,920	
26	30 June 2002	Spider-Man	£2,605,993	
27	7 July 2002	Minority Report	£4,506,315	
28	14 July 2002	Scooby-Doo	£5,129,109	
29	21 July 2002	Scooby-Doo	£2,513,564	
30	28 July 2002	Austin Powers in Goldmember	£5,585,978	
31	4 August 2002	Men in Black II	£6,191,428	
32	11 August 2002	Men in Black II	£3,106,105	
33	18 August 2002	Men in Black II	£1,403,344	
34	25 August 2002	The Guru	£1,521,984	
35	1 September 2002	Insomnia	£1,159,754	
36	8 September 2002	The Bourne Identity	£2,150,511	
37	15 September 2002	Signs	£3,767,713	
38	22 September 2002	Signs	£2,657,379	
39	29 September 2002	Signs	£1,877,796	
40	6 October 2002	Lilo & Stitch	£1,516,249	
41	13 October 2002	Red Dragon	£3,180,493	
42	20 October 2002	xXx	£3,435,891	
43	27 October 2002	xXx	£2,044,850	
44	3 November 2002	28 Days Later	£1,500,079	
45	10 November 2002	28 Days Later	£1,073,142	
46	17 November 2002	Harry Potter and the Chamber of Secrets †	£18,871,829	
47	24 November 2002	Die Another Day	£9,122,344	
48	1 December 2002	Die Another Day	£5,364,433	
49	8 December 2002	Die Another Day	£3,426,623	
50	15 December 2002	Die Another Day	£2,220,351	
51	22 December 2002	The Lord of the Rings: The Two Towers	£13,063,560	
52	29 December 2002	The Lord of the Rings: The Two Towers	£8,177,801	

== See also ==
- List of British films — British films by year
- Lists of box office number-one films

Preceded by 2001	2002	Succeeded by 2003
