= Christian Duguay =

Christian Duguay may refer to:

- Christian Duguay (actor) (born 1970), American comic actor
- Christian Duguay (director) (born 1956), Canadian director
