= Devil's Gate (2004 film) =

- Directed by: Stuart St. Paul
- Written by: Stuart St Paul; Trevor Todd
- Produced by: Stuart St Paul; Jean Heard
- Starring: Laura Fraser; Callum Blue
- Cinematography: Malcolm McLean
- Edited by: Chris Joyce
- Music by: Mark Blackledge
- Distributed by: Echelon Entertainment
- Release date: 2004
- Country: United Kingdom
- Language: English

Devil's Gate is a 2004 British film directed by Stuart St. Paul. Upon learning of her father's illness the protagonist Rachael decides to travel home - despite having previously had no intent to ever visit the town again. Her feelings for the town derive from her mistreatment by her mother. Various tragedies occur which essentially trap her on the island - mysteries soon arise. Devil's Gate was mainly filmed on the islands of Shetland, due to the stark landscape.

== Cast ==
- Laura Fraser - Rachael
- Callum Blue - Rafe
- Luke Aikman - Matt
- Roger Ashton-Griffiths - Eagle
- Tom Bell - Jake
- Patrick Gordon - Clem
- Lynda Bellingham - Marlene
- Jean Heard - Betty
- Mames Kristian - Bob
