= Solid Geometry (film) =

2002 British television film

- Based on: "Solid Geometry" by Ian McEwan
- Written by: Denis Lawson
- Directed by: Denis Lawson
- Starring: Ewan McGregor; Ruth Millar; Peter Capaldi
- Country of origin: United Kingdom
- Original language: English

Production
- Running time: 24 minutes

Original release
- Network: Channel 4
- Release: 2002

Solid Geometry is a 2002 British mystery drama short film written and directed by Denis Lawson and starring his nephew Ewan McGregor and Ruth Millar. It is based on a short story by Ian McEwan, published in the 1975 collection First Love, Last Rites. It was made for the Scottish Television/Grampian Television New Found Land series, first shown by them on 3 October 2002. Co-financed by Channel 4, it was subsequently shown by them on 28 November 2002. Production on an earlier BBC adaptation was halted at a late stage in 1979.

== Plot ==
Phil (McGregor) is a successful advertising executive and Maisie (Millar) is his young and hedonistic wife, but their lives are thrown into turmoil when Phil inherits his great-great grandfather's secret diaries. He becomes obsessed with research into solid geometry contained in the diaries and is fascinated by the theory of "a plane without a surface." His pursuit of this mythical geometric concept tears his marriage apart. The film is interspersed with flashbacks showing Phil's great-great grandfather discovering the same mysteries of the supernatural side of geometry as Phil is uncovering by reading the diaries.

Eventually Phil follows the instructions buried in the diaries and begins carefully folding a large sheet of paper in on itself like a lotus flower, then the folded paper emits a bright light, folds over itself and disappears. On seeing this, he dedicates his life to understanding more about the diaries and his great-great grandfather's mysterious disappearance.

He goes on to become obsessed with this transformation and the discussion in the book which links it to 'sexual intercourse positions' of which the diary claims there are only 17. After a love-making session with his wife, he proceeds to place another of the paper lotus flowers in the center of her curled body. As she curls into a foetal position unknowingly around the paper flower, she somehow completes the flower folding as had previously been achieved with just the paper. She spins around the paper flower several times and disappears, emitting tones of shock and fear. The film ends with Phil alone in bed.
