= Stuart St. Paul =

British stuntman and broadcster

Stuart St. Paul is a stuntman, director, broadcaster and author. St. Paul was born in Walthamstow, London, and attended the McEntee Technical High School. He fought competitively in Judo attending two National Championships represented Sussex University in 1972.

== Career ==
St. Paul joined BBC Radio in 1973 working as a backroom assistant technical engineer to disc jockeys Tony Blackburn, Johnny Walker, David Hamilton and Noel Edmunds amongst others.

While at the BBC he did the nighttime show on UBN as one of the second wave of DJ's, along with Steve Allen and Dale Winton.

In 1977 he left to join EMI and became the promotions manager at Capitol Records, breaking Mink DeVille's "Spanish Stroll" amongst other singles.

In 1978 he joined Metro Radio in Newcastle as the new breakfast DJ, and that year compered the main tent at the Tyneside Summer Exhibition introducing acts such as The New Seekers and The Bay City Rollers. After signing with agent Bill Steel he starred in Cinderella that year at the Sunderland Empire, alongside Bill Maynard. In 1979, St. Paul took over from Steve Wright on Radio Orwell in Ipswich when Wright left for BBC Radio 1.

St. Paul worked on multiple films and television sets as an actor, including Minder, The Kenny Everett Video Show, Juliet Bravo and The Bill but soon moved into stunts although he later made an appearance in Mrs. Brown's Boys D'Movie.

He worked on stunts for many pop videos and including doubling Elton John in "Passenger" and often working as double for Simon LeBon, as well as designing all the action in the short film and video "Wild Boys" where he worked alongside Arlene Philips. St. Paul worked as a stunt coordinator and doubled for Dennis Waterman in Stay Lucky, performed many stunts for Noel's House Party and also choreographed fight sequences for Jean-Claude Van Damme.

He also coordinated and choreographed A View to a Kill, Never Say Never Again, Lifeforce, The Krays, and Pink Floyd: The Wall, and also played the Queen Alien in Aliens. He was stunt co-ordinator for Emmerdale for 26 years.

St. Paul has directed several films including 1998's The Scarlet Tunic starring Jean-Marc Barr, Simon Callow and Lynda Bellingham. He has directed several other films including 2004's Devil’s Gate, with Laura Fraser and Tom Bell, which received a nomination at Fantasporto.

St. Paul won Best Director at Breckenridge for the 2010 film Freight. It also won the Silva Palm at the Melbourne International Film Festival.

== Author ==
St. Paul has written a number of novels, including six novels in the CSCI series; Cruise Ship Heist, Cruise Ship Serial Killer, Cruise Traffic, Cruise Ship Art Theft, Disastrous Cruise Romance, and Bloods Diamonds.

St. Paul is a Patron of the Evesham Festival of Words literary Festival.

== Personal life ==
St. Paul is married to the actress Jean Heard. He is the father of entrepreneur Luke Aikman and actress Laura Aikman.
