= Ruth Millar =

Scottish actress, writer and producer

- Born: Ruth Laura Millar; 1975 (age 50–51); Newton Mearns, near Glasgow

Ruth Laura Millar (born in 1975 Newton Mearns, near Glasgow, Scotland) is a Scottish actress, writer and producer.

== Early years ==
She spent her early years in Glasgow before attending Central Saint Martins College of Art and Design where she graduated with a degree in fine art in 1996. After leaving art school Millar formed Wee Lassie Productions, a production company that showcased the best of acting and writing talent. The showcase was held for one night only at the Groucho Club, London. This was where Millar was spotted by an agent and then landed the Punto girl in one of the year's most successful advertising campaigns.

== Acting career ==
Millar starred in Glasgow Kiss alongside Iain Glen and Sharon Small, as younger sister Jess Rossi, to great acclaim. North Square was the next lead role, where she played pupil barrister Morag Black in the Bafta winning Channel 4 drama, starring alongside Phil Davis, Helen McCrory, Rupert Penry-Jones and Kevin McKidd. Millar then went on to work on several hit television shows including Silent Witness, Life on Mars, Friends and Crocodiles, Legless, Footballers' Wives, New Street Law, Sold, Auf Wiedersehen Pet and Monarch of the Glen. Millar's feature films include Love Live Long by Mike Figgis and Broken Lines with Paul Bettany in 2008. In 2003 she played alongside Ewan McGregor in the Channel 4 short film Solid Geometry, directed by McGregor's uncle Denis Lawson. In 2009 Millar reprised the role of Jackie Queen from Life on Mars in the sequel series Ashes to Ashes. Millar recently returned to the UK and can be seen in Doctors as Sonia O'Neil. Millar has partnered with Marcus McPeake, a Scottish writer and director/producer, and has a feature film in development for 2014.

== Theatre roles ==
Millar starred as Pia in the original cast of Festen starring alongside Jonny Lee Miller as Christian at the Almeida Theatre, London, before transferring to the Lyric Theatre. "Festen" was directed by Rufus Norris and nominated for five Laurence Olivier Awards.

== Personal life ==
Millar now lives in Scotland with her three daughters, Grace Sophia, Ava Jeanne and Peggy Margot.
