= 1996 in British music =

This is a summary of 1996 in music in the United Kingdom, including the official charts from that year.

== Summary ==
This year saw the start of an increase in the number of number 1 singles. 24 hit the top spot this year, the highest since 1980, which had an equal number.

The first number 1 single of the year was "Jesus to a Child", George Michael's first solo #1 for 10 years. This was followed by Babylon Zoo's "Spaceman", which had been used in an advert for Levi's. The single was quite different from the version used in the advert, which had been sped up and re-arranged. It stayed at #1 for five weeks, sold over a million copies, and Jas Mann, the man behind Babylon Zoo, became the first solo male to make their chart debut at number 1.

After five years, the boy band Take That announced that they were splitting up, resulting in such distress for their many fans that a telephone helpline had to be set up. Their final number 1 came in March, a cover of the Bee Gees song "How Deep Is Your Love". Several of the members went on to start a solo career, with Gary Barlow the first to hit #1 with "Forever Love" in July. However, it would be Robbie Williams who would go on to score the most success as a solo artist.

After George Michael scored another number 1 with "Fastlove" in April, Gina G reached the top spot with "Ooh Aah... Just a Little Bit" in May. This song was the UK's entry to the 1996 Eurovision Song Contest, and originally reached #6 when it was released at the beginning of April. It hovered around the top 5 for the next few weeks, before moving up to 1 in the week of the contest. Although it failed to win, it still became the first Eurovision song to hit #1 since Nicole's "A Little Peace", which won the contest in 1982.

The next number 1 was also influenced by media events: "Three Lions", released by comedians David Baddiel and Frank Skinner and the band The Lightning Seeds, was the official song of the 1996 European Football Championship (Euro '96), which was being held in England. A rewritten version of the song ("Three Lions '98") would reach number 1 two years later, coinciding with the Football World Cup 1998 (France '98).

The Fugees had the biggest selling single of the year, with a cover of Roberta Flack's "Killing Me Softly With His Song". It sold over a million copies.

However, by far the most successful act of the year was the Spice Girls, who kickstarted their career with three number 1 singles – the million-selling "Wannabe" in July, which was one of the longest No 1 stints by any girl group (7 weeks); (Shakespears Sister's "Stay" is the longest girl group No 1, with 8 weeks), and remains the biggest-selling single by a girl group; "Say You'll Be There" in October; and "2 Become 1" in December, also a million-seller, the year's Christmas number one single and the UK's fastest selling single of 1996. The Spice Girls debut album Spice was the fastest selling album of 1996, shifting over 1.8 million copies in just 7 weeks. It was also the Number 1 album for Christmas 1996 and the second-best-selling album of the year.

Oasis smashed the record for most weeks in the singles chart (previously held by Adam and the Ants in 1981) with 134 weeks, thanks to mass waves of re-entries of songs from their back catalogue throughout the year.

1996 is also grimly notable for having the drummers of two popular bands, Mathew Fletcher of Heavenly, on 14 June, and Chris Acland of Lush, on 17 October, commit suicide. Lush had at the time been in the final stages of planning an American tour, which his devastated bandmates cancelled; they then disbanded.

Prolific classical composer Peter Maxwell Davies produced the tenth of his Strathclyde Concertos, an orchestral work which was first performed in Glasgow in October by the Scottish Chamber Orchestra, under the composer's baton. In June, his new opera, The Doctor of Myddfai, was premièred in Cardiff. Other British composers who produced new works were Michael Berkeley (Viola Concerto) and John Tavener (Innocence). Andrew Lloyd Webber's new musical, Whistle Down the Wind opened in Washington D.C. in December, to poor reviews, but its score would go on to provide Boyzone with one of the best-selling singles of the decade in the form of "No Matter What"; the show did not appear in the West End until 1998.

== Events ==
- 19 February – Jarvis Cocker disrupts a performance by Michael Jackson at the BRIT Awards. During an elaborate staging of "Earth Song" Cocker and Peter Mansell (a former Pulp member) invade the stage; Cocker lifts his shirt and points his bottom in Jackson's direction before getting into a scuffle with security. He is arrested and taken for questioning (with Bob Mortimer acting as his solicitor), but is released without charge. Cocker later states that his actions were "a form of protest at the way Michael Jackson sees himself as some kind of Christ-like figure with the power of healing".
- 28 February – At the 38th Annual Grammy Awards in Los Angeles:
  - Trevor Horn (producer) and Seal win Record of the Year for "Kiss From a Rose".
  - Christopher Hogwood (conductor), Sylvia McNair and the Academy of Ancient Music win Best Classical Vocal Performance for The Echoing Air – The Music of Henry Purcell.
  - Annie Lennox wins Best Female Pop Vocal Performance for "No More 'I Love You's'".
  - The Chieftains and Van Morrison win Best Pop Collaboration with Vocals for "Have I Told You Lately"
- 1 March – Status Quo take BBC Radio One to the High Court over a dispute in which the station refused to play their single "Fun Fun Fun". The band lost their case, with Radio One arguing that Status Quo does not fit the demographic audience that the station is reaching out to.
- 2 March – Melody Maker praises Jarvis Cocker for his protest at the Brit Awards ceremony, suggesting he should be knighted.
- 4 March – The Beatles' second reunion song is released as part of their first reunion since the band's breakup 26 years earlier. The song is a finished version of "Real Love", a John Lennon demo from 1980.
- 22 March – Black Grape perform a cover of "Pretty Vacant" by the Sex Pistols on TFI Friday on Channel 4. During the performance, Shaun Ryder uses several f-words and the incident results in Ryder being banned from live broadcasting and TFI Friday being recorded instead of being broadcast live.
- 1 April – John Squire announces his departure from the Stone Roses. He is replaced by Aziz Ibrahim, formerly of Simply Red.
- 28 April – Oasis play the second of two gigs in Maine Road, home of Manchester City F.C., featured on the video "...There and Then".
- June – Musicians listed in the Queen's Birthday Honours include songwriter Ivan Morrison, clarinetist Emma Johnson, jazz pianist George Shearing and opera singer Felicity Lott.
- 21 June – The Sex Pistols reform and begin their 78-date Filthy Lucre Tour. This would be the first time the band have performed together since their original breakup in 1978, and their first with Glen Matlock since his original departure in 1977.
- 8 July – The Spice Girls release their début single "Wannabe" in the United Kingdom. The song proved to be a global hit, hitting number one in 31 countries and becoming not only the biggest-selling début single by an all-female group, but also the biggest-selling single by an all-female group of all time.
- 18 July – First performance of James MacMillan’s cor Anglais concerto The World’s Ransoming, with the London Symphony Orchestra and its principal cor Anglais player Christine Pendrill as soloist, conducted by Kent Nagano at the Barbican.
- 22 July – Rob Collins, keyboardist with the Charlatans, is killed in a car crash on a country road outside Monmouth.
- July – The Spice Girls appear in Top of the Pops magazine, where each member is given a nickname based upon her image: "Posh Spice", "Baby Spice", "Scary Spice", "Ginger Spice", and "Sporty Spice".
- 10 August – Oasis play two nights at Knebworth House with an audience of 125,000 per night. Over 2.5 million people applied for tickets for the shows, making it the largest-ever demand for concert tickets in British history. They are supported by the Charlatans, Kula Shaker, Manic Street Preachers, the Bootleg Beatles, the Chemical Brothers, Ocean Colour Scene and the Prodigy.
- 25 August – The Stone Roses perform a disastrous final gig at the Reading Festival. The performance receive a negative reception from fans and critics, with Ian Brown's vocals being particularly criticised. The band would then split up in October.
- 4 September – Oasis perform "Champagne Supernova" at the MTV Video Music Awards, held in New York. During the performance, Liam Gallagher makes obscene gestures at brother Noel as he plays his guitar solo, then spits beer all over the stage before storming off.
- 12 September – These Premises are Alarmed for orchestra by Thomas Adès is performed for the first time at the Bridgewater Hall in Manchester.
- 14 September – The first open-air "Proms in the Park" is staged in Hyde Park as part of the Proms Last Night celebrations.
- 3 October – The premiere of James MacMillan's Cello Concerto takes place at the Barbican Centre with soloist Mstislav Rostropovich and the London Symphony Orchestra, conducted by Colin Davis.
- 19 October – The premiere of Gnarly Buttons for clarinet and chamber ensemble by the American composer John Adams, takes place at the Queen Elizabeth Hall, with the composer conducting the London Sinfonietta and Michael Collins as soloist.
- 31 October – David Brookes is fined £45 in Hampstead Magistrates' Court for disrupting the "quiet enjoyment" of the public by playing his bagpipes on Hampstead Heath. Described as "a pain in the neck" by a spokesperson for the College of Pipers in Glasgow, Brookes said he had been playing the pipes on the heath for twenty years and had been given permission to do so, adding that he is surprised by the ruling because social workers were allowed to distribute condoms there.
- November – Jesus Christ Superstar is revived in London's West End. Directed by Gale Edwards, this version stars Steve Balsamo and Zubin Varla as Jesus and Judas, with Joanna Ampil as Mary Magdalene, and a recording is released as an album.
- 12 December – Mike Joyce, former drummer with the Smiths, is awarded £1 million in missing royalties and damages from former bandmates Morrissey and Johnny Marr in the High Court.

== Charts ==
=== Number-one singles ===
Chart date (week ending)	Song	Artist(s)	Sales
6 January	"Earth Song"	Michael Jackson	55,000
13 January	"Earth Song"	Michael Jackson	80,000
20 January	"Jesus to a Child"	George Michael	113,000
27 January	"Spaceman"	Babylon Zoo	417,547
3 February	"Spaceman"	Babylon Zoo	204,000
10 February	"Spaceman"	Babylon Zoo	129,000
17 February	"Spaceman"	Babylon Zoo	80,000
24 February	"Spaceman"	Babylon Zoo	63,000
2 March	"Don't Look Back in Anger"	Oasis	250,000
9 March	"How Deep Is Your Love"	Take That	257,000
16 March	"How Deep Is Your Love"	Take That	120,000
23 March	"How Deep Is Your Love"	Take That	90,000
30 March	"Firestarter"	The Prodigy	119,000
6 April	"Firestarter"	The Prodigy	80,000
13 April	"Firestarter"	The Prodigy	78,000
20 April	"Return of the Mack"	Mark Morrison	90,000
27 April	"Return of the Mack"	Mark Morrison	90,000
4 May	"Fastlove"	George Michael	110,000
11 May	"Fastlove"	George Michael	74,000
18 May	"Fastlove"	George Michael	56,000
25 May	"Ooh Aah... Just a Little Bit"	Gina G	75,000
1 June	"Three Lions"	Baddiel, Skinner & The Lightning Seeds	110,000
8 June	"Killing Me Softly"	The Fugees	157,000
15 June	"Killing Me Softly"	The Fugees	195,000
22 June	"Killing Me Softly"	The Fugees	173,000
29 June	"Killing Me Softly"	The Fugees	160,000
6 July	"Three Lions"	Baddiel, Skinner & The Lightning Seeds	138,000
13 July	"Killing Me Softly"	The Fugees	98,000
20 July	"Forever Love"	Gary Barlow	109,000
27 July	"Wannabe"	Spice Girls	108,000
3 August	"Wannabe"	Spice Girls	154,000
10 August	"Wannabe"	Spice Girls	150,000
17 August	"Wannabe"	Spice Girls	145,000
24 August	"Wannabe"	Spice Girls	125,000
31 August	"Wannabe"	Spice Girls	110,000
7 September	"Wannabe"	Spice Girls	90,000
14 September	"Flava"	Peter Andre	129,000
21 September	"Ready or Not"	The Fugees	72,000
28 September	"Ready or Not"	The Fugees	75,000
5 October	"Breakfast at Tiffany's"	Deep Blue Something	85,000
12 October	"Setting Sun"	The Chemical Brothers	99,000
19 October	"Words"	Boyzone	232,000
26 October	"Say You'll Be There"	Spice Girls	350,000
2 November	"Say You'll Be There"	Spice Girls	163,000
9 November	"What Becomes of the Brokenhearted" / "Saturday Night at the Movies" / "You'll Never Walk Alone"	Robson & Jerome	196,000
16 November	"What Becomes of the Brokenhearted" / "Saturday Night at the Movies" / "You'll Never Walk Alone"	Robson & Jerome	113,000
23 November	"Breathe"	The Prodigy	195,000
30 November	"Breathe"	The Prodigy	95,000
7 December	"I Feel You"	Peter Andre	87,000
14 December	"A Different Beat"	Boyzone	90,000
21 December	"Knockin' on Heaven's Door"/"Throw These Guns Away"	Dunblane	189,000
28 December	"2 Become 1"	Spice Girls	500,000

=== Number-one albums ===
Chart date (week ending)	Album	Artist	Sales
6 January	Robson & Jerome	Robson & Jerome	216,000
13 January	(What's the Story) Morning Glory?	Oasis	53,000
20 January	(What's the Story) Morning Glory?	Oasis	48,000
27 January	(What's the Story) Morning Glory?	Oasis	46,000
3 February	(What's the Story) Morning Glory?	Oasis	45,000
10 February	(What's the Story) Morning Glory?	Oasis	48,000
17 February	(What's the Story) Morning Glory?	Oasis	42,000
24 February	Expecting to Fly	The Bluetones	83,000
2 March	(What's the Story) Morning Glory?	Oasis	81,000
9 March	(What's the Story) Morning Glory?	Oasis	107,000
16 March	(What's the Story) Morning Glory?	Oasis	84,000
23 March	Falling into You	Céline Dion	101,000
30 March	Anthology 2	The Beatles	78,000
6 April	Greatest Hits	Take That	276,000
13 April	Greatest Hits	Take That	174,000
20 April	Greatest Hits	Take That	100,000
27 April	Greatest Hits	Take That	52,000
4 May	Jagged Little Pill	Alanis Morissette	54,000
11 May	Jagged Little Pill	Alanis Morissette	65,000
18 May	1977	Ash	54,000
25 May	Older	George Michael	281,000
1 June	Older	George Michael	114,000
8 June	Older	George Michael	80,000
15 June	Load	Metallica	70,000
22 June	18 Til I Die	Bryan Adams	54,000
29 June	Jagged Little Pill	Alanis Morissette	42,000
6 July	Recurring Dream	Crowded House	80,000
13 July	Recurring Dream	Crowded House	47,000
20 July	Jagged Little Pill	Alanis Morissette	41,000
27 July	Jagged Little Pill	Alanis Morissette	37,000
3 August	Jagged Little Pill	Alanis Morissette	59,000
10 August	Jagged Little Pill	Alanis Morissette	62,000
17 August	Jagged Little Pill	Alanis Morissette	56,000
24 August	Jagged Little Pill	Alanis Morissette	49,000
31 August	Jagged Little Pill	Alanis Morissette	45,000
7 September	Jagged Little Pill	Alanis Morissette	47,000
14 September	Coming Up	Suede	42,000
21 September	New Adventures in Hi-Fi	R.E.M	125,000
28 September	K	Kula Shaker	133,000
5 October	K	Kula Shaker	54,000
12 October	Natural	Peter Andre	45,000
19 October	Greatest Hits	Simply Red	87,000
26 October	Greatest Hits	Simply Red	84,000
2 November	Blue Is the Colour	The Beautiful South	80,000
9 November	A Different Beat	Boyzone	95,000
16 November	Spice	Spice Girls	128,000
23 November	Take Two	Robson & Jerome	187,000
30 November	Take Two	Robson & Jerome	168,000
7 December	Spice	Spice Girls	170,000
14 December	Spice	Spice Girls	217,000
21 December	Spice	Spice Girls	271,000
28 December	Spice	Spice Girls	364,000

=== Number-one compilation albums ===
Chart date (week ending)	Album
6 January	Hits 96
13 January	Hits 96
20 January	Hits 96
27 January	Hits 96
3 February	Sisters of Swing
10 February	The Best Album in the World...Ever! 2
17 February	The Best Album in the World...Ever! 2
24 February	The No.1 Love Album
2 March	In the Mix 96
9 March	In the Mix 96
16 March	In the Mix 96
23 March	In the Mix 96
30 March	Now 33
6 April	Now 33
13 April	Now 33
20 April	Now 33
27 April	Now 33
4 May	Dance Zone 7
11 May	Boyz of Swing
18 May	New Hits 96
25 May	New Hits 96
1 June	New Hits 96
8 June	New Hits 96
15 June	New Hits 96
22 June	New Hits 96
29 June	New Hits 96
6 July	New Hits 96
13 July	New Hits 96
20 July	Big Mix '96
27 July	Big Mix '96
3 August	Big Mix '96
10 August	Big Mix '96
17 August	The Best Dance Album in the World...Ever! Part 6
24 August	Now 34
31 August	Now 34
7 September	Now 34
14 September	Now 34
21 September	Now 34
28 September	Now 34
5 October	Now 34
12 October	In the Mix 96 – 3
19 October	Kiss in Ibiza '96
26 October	Kiss in Ibiza '96
2 November	Kiss in Ibiza '96
9 November	Kiss in Ibiza '96
16 November	Huge Hits 1996
23 November	Huge Hits 1996
30 November	Now 35
7 December	Now 35
14 December	Now 35
21 December	Now 35
28 December	Now 35

== Year-end charts ==
=== Best-selling singles ===
No.	Title	Artist	Peak position
1	"Killing Me Softly"	Fugees	1
2	"Wannabe"	Spice Girls	1
3	"Spaceman"	Babylon Zoo	1
4	"Say You'll Be There"	Spice Girls	1
5	"Return of the Mack"	Mark Morrison	1
6	"Ooh Aah... Just a Little Bit"	Gina G	1
7	"Three Lions"	Baddiel & Skinner & Lightning Seeds	1
8	"Children"	Robert Miles	2
9	"Mysterious Girl"	Peter Andre featuring Bubbler Ranx	2
10	"2 Become 1"	Spice Girls	1
11	"Don't Look Back in Anger"	Oasis	1
12	"How Deep Is Your Love"	Take That	1
13	"Un-Break My Heart"	Toni Braxton	2
14	"Breathe"	The Prodigy	1
15	"Firestarter"	The Prodigy	1
16	"Words"	Boyzone	1
17	"Breakfast at Tiffany's"	Deep Blue Something	1
18	"If You Ever"	East 17 featuring Gabrielle	2
19	"What Becomes of the Broken Hearted"/ "Saturday Night at the Movies"/"You'll Never Walk Alone"	Robson & Jerome	1
20	"Anything"	3T	2
21	"Fastlove"	George Michael	1
22	"Macarena"	Los del Río	2
23	"Born Slippy .NUXX"	Underworld	2
24	"Ready or Not"	Fugees	1
25	"The X Files"	Mark Snow	2
26	"One & One"	Robert Miles featuring Maria Nayler	3
27	"Because You Loved Me"	Celine Dion	5
28	"Give Me a Little More Time"	Gabrielle	5
29	"Nobody Knows"	The Tony Rich Project	4
30	"You're Gorgeous"	Babybird	3
31	"Knockin' on Heaven's Door"/"Throw These Guns Away"	Dunblane	1
32	"Cecilia"	Suggs featuring Louchie Lou & Michie One	4
33	"Flava"	Peter Andre	1
34	"Don't Stop Movin'"	Livin' Joy	5
35	"It's All Coming Back to Me Now"	Celine Dion	3
36	"I Love You Always Forever"	Donna Lewis	5
37	"How Bizarre"	OMC	5
38	"Jesus to a Child"	George Michael	1
39	"Virtual Insanity"	Jamiroquai	3
40	"Forever Love"	Gary Barlow	1
41	"Hillbilly Rock Hillbilly Roll"	The Woolpackers	5
42	"I Wanna Be a Hippy"	Technohead	6
43	"There's Nothing I Won't Do"	JX	4
44	"Insomnia"	Faithless	3
45	"What's Love Got to Do with It"	Warren G featuring Adina Howard	2
46	"Freedom"	Robbie Williams	2
47	"I Got 5 on It"	Luniz	3
48	"Earth Song"	Michael Jackson	1
49	"Spinning the Wheel"	George Michael	2
50	"A Design for Life"	Manic Street Preachers	2

=== Best-selling albums ===
No.	Title	Artist	Peak position	Sales
1	Jagged Little Pill	Alanis Morissette	1	2,000,000
2	(What's the Story) Morning Glory?	Oasis	1	1,840,000
3	Spice	Spice Girls	1	1,678,000
4	Falling into You	Celine Dion	1	
5	Older	George Michael	1	
6	Take Two	Robson & Jerome	1	
7	The Score	Fugees	2	
8	Greatest Hits	Take That	1	
9	Greatest Hits	Simply Red	1	
10	Blue Is the Colour	The Beautiful South	1	
11	Moseley Shoals	Ocean Colour Scene	2	
12	Recurring Dream: The Very Best of Crowded House	Crowded House	1	
13	Ocean Drive	Lighthouse Family	3	
14	Bizarre Fruit/Bizarre Fruit II	M People	3	
15	Travelling Without Moving	Jamiroquai	2	
16	K	Kula Shaker	1	
17	The Smurfs Go Pop!	The Smurfs	2	
18	A Different Beat	Boyzone	1	
19	Different Class	Pulp	2 (Note: Reached number 1 in 1995)	
20	Everything Must Go	Manic Street Preachers	2	
21	Definitely Maybe	Oasis	9 (Note: Reached number 1 in 1994)	
22	Hits	Mike and the Mechanics	3	
23	Around the World Hit Singles: The Journey So Far	East 17	3	
24	18 til I Die	Bryan Adams	1	
25	Garbage	Garbage	6	
26	Wildest Dreams	Tina Turner	4	
27	All Change	Cast	7	
28	Secrets	Toni Braxton	10	
29	1977	Ash	1	
30	Sheryl Crow	Sheryl Crow	5	
31	Christmas Party	The Smurfs	8	
32	Stanley Road	Paul Weller	7 (Note: Reached number 1 in 1995)	
33	Free Peace Sweet	Dodgy	7	
34	New Adventures in Hi-Fi	R.E.M.	1	
35	HIStory: Past, Present and Future, Book I	Michael Jackson	3 (Note: Reached number 1 in 1995)	
36	Said and Done	Boyzone	5 (Note: Reached number 1 in 1995)	
37	Robert Miles	Robert Miles	7	
38	Spiders	Space	5	
39	Robson & Jerome	Robson & Jerome	1	
40	The Bends	Radiohead	4	
41	Expecting to Fly	The Bluetones	1	
42	Natural	Peter Andre	1	
43	If We Fall in Love Tonight	Rod Stewart	8	
44	Life	Simply Red	8 (Note: Reached number 1 in 1995)	
45	Crocodile Shoes II	Jimmy Nail	10	
46	Walking Wounded	Everything but the Girl	4	
47	Evita	Madonna/Various Artists	7 (Note: Reached number 1 in 1997)	
48	The It Girl	Sleeper	5	
49	The Finest	Fine Young Cannibals	10	
50	Mercury Falling	Sting	4	

=== Best-selling compilation albums ===
No.	Title	Peak position
1	Now 35	1
2	Now 34	1
3	Trainspotting Original Soundtrack	2
4	The Best Sixties Album in the World... Ever! II	2
5	Now 33	1
6	New Hits 96	1
7	The Best Dance Album in the World... Ever! 6	1
8	Heartbeat: No. 1 Love Songs of the 60s	2
9	The Annual II	3 (Note: Reached number 1 in 1997)
10	The Love Album III	2

== Classical music ==
- Michael Garrett – Fantasia No. 2 for string orchestra, Op. 111
- Peter Maxwell Davies –
  - Strathclyde Concerto No. 10: Concerto for Orchestra
  - Symphony No. 6
- Howard Blake – Flute Concerto

== Opera ==
- Peter Maxwell Davies – The Doctor of Myddfai

== Musical films ==
- James and the Giant Peach

== Births ==
- 1 February – Dionne Bromfield, singer-songwriter and TV presenter
- 15 May – Birdy, singer
- 7 October – Lewis Capaldi

== Deaths ==
- 17 January – Harry Robertson, musician, bandleader, music director and composer, 63
- 21 January – the London Boys:
  - Edem Ephraim, 36 (car accident)
  - Dennis Fuller, 36 (car accident)
- 17 February – Evelyn Laye, actress and singer, 95
- 19 March – Alan Ridout, composer, 61
- 8 April – Donald Adams, opera singer and actor, 67 (brain tumour)
- 28 April – Christopher Headington, composer, pianist, musicologist, and music critic, 65
- 6 May – Wally Nightingale, guitarist, 40 (drug-related)
- 19 June – Vivian Ellis, composer, 93
- 17 July – Chas Chandler (The Animals), 57 (heart attack)
- 22 July – Rob Collins, keyboard player, 33 (car crash)
- 12 October – Vernon Elliott, bassoonist, conductor and composer, 84
- 17 October
  - Chris Acland, drummer, 30 (suicide)
  - Berthold Goldschmidt, composer in exile, 93
- 23 October – Alexander Kelly, pianist and composer, 67
- 12 November – Gwen Catley, operatic soprano, 90
- 26 November – Charles Proctor, conductor, pianist, composer, 90
- 28 November – Anna Pollak, operatic mezzo-soprano, 84
- 14 December – Norman Hackforth, accompanist and broadcaster, 87
- 15 December – Dave Kaye, pianist, 90
- 17 December – Ruby Murray, singer and actress, 61
- 23 December – Ronnie Scott, jazz musician and club owner, 69

== Music awards ==
=== BRIT Awards ===
The 1996 BRIT Awards winners were:

- Artist of a generation: Michael Jackson
- Best British producer: Brian Eno
- Best soundtrack: Batman Forever
- British album: Oasis – (What's the Story) Morning Glory
- British breakthrough act: Supergrass
- British dance act: Massive Attack
- British female solo artist: Annie Lennox
- British group: Oasis
- British male solo artist: Paul Weller
- British single: Take That – "Back for Good"
- British video: Oasis – "Wonderwall"
- Freddie Mercury award: The Help Album for the charity Warchild
- International breakthrough act: Alanis Morissette
- International female: Björk
- International group: Bon Jovi
- International male: Prince
- Outstanding contribution: David Bowie

=== Mercury Music Prize ===
The 1996 Mercury Music Prize was awarded to Pulp – Different Class.

== See also ==
- 1996 in British radio
- 1996 in British television
- 1996 in the United Kingdom
- List of British films of 1996
