= Jerome Flynn =

English actor and singer (born 1963)

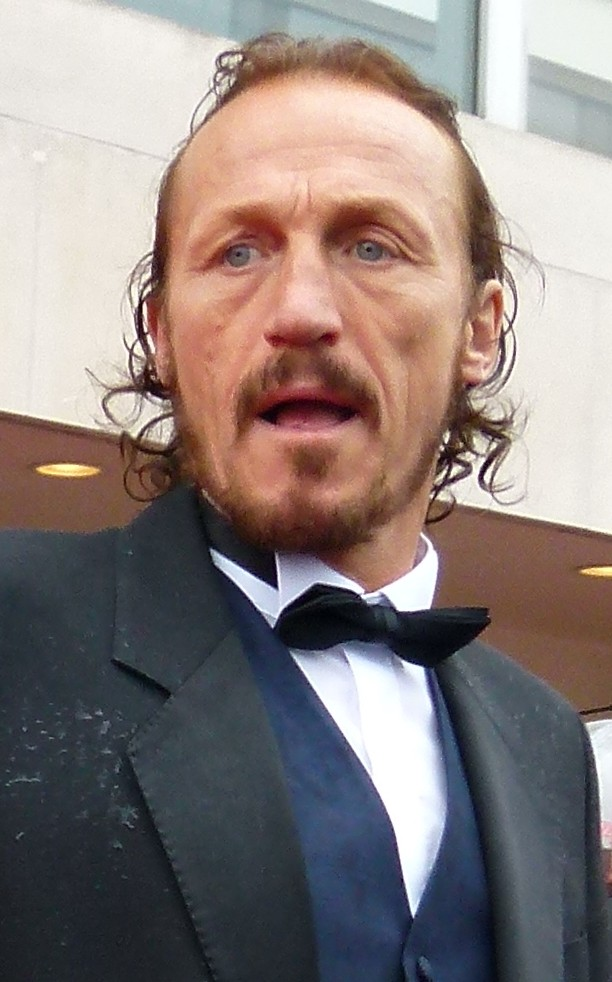
- Flynn at the 2013 BAFTA TV Awards
- Born: Jerome Patrick Flynn; 16 March 1963 (age 63); Bromley, Kent, England
- Education: Royal Central School of Speech and Drama
- Occupations: Actor; singer
- Years active: 1985–present
- Father: Eric Flynn
- Relatives: Daniel Flynn (brother); Johnny Flynn (half-brother)
- Website: jeromeflynn.com

Jerome Patrick Flynn (born 16 March 1963) is a British actor and singer. He is best known for his role as Bronn in the HBO fantasy series Game of Thrones (2011–2019). His other roles include Paddy Garvey of the King's Fusiliers in the ITV series Soldier Soldier (1991–1995), Bennet Drake in the BBC mystery series Ripper Street (2012–2016), Hector in the Black Mirror episode "Shut Up and Dance" (2016), Banner Creighton in the Paramount+ western series 1923 (2022–2025) and Boris Oliver in L2: Empuraan (2025).

He and his Soldier Soldier co-star Robson Green also performed as Robson & Jerome in the latter half of the 1990s. They released a version of "Unchained Melody", which stayed at number 1 for 7 weeks on the UK Chart, selling more than a million copies and becoming the best-selling single of 1995. The duo had two further number 1 singles: "I Believe" and "What Becomes of the Brokenhearted". Their eponymous debut album and the follow-up Take Two reached number 1 on the UK Albums Chart.

== Early life ==
Flynn was born on 16 March 1963, in Bromley, Kent, (now part of Greater London). He is the son of actor and singer Eric Flynn, who was born on Hainan Island in China, and drama teacher Fern Flynn. He has a brother, actor Daniel Flynn, a sister; and a half-sister and a half-brother, musician and actor Johnny Flynn, from his father's second marriage.

== Career ==
In 1986, Flynn appeared in the LWT television film London's Burning as firefighter Kenny "Rambo" Baines. When the film spawned a series of the same name in 1988, he was unable to reprise his role due to previous commitments. Also in 1986, he played a minor role as the soldier "Franny" in "The Monocled Mutineer". In 1988 he played the character Freddie in the ITV drama The Fear, which was about the London underworld. He appeared as D.S Eddie Hargreaves for six episodes of the British Academy Television Award (BAFTA) winning police drama, Between The Lines between 1992 and 1994.

Flynn portrayed Corporal Paddy Garvey of the King's Fusiliers, alongside Robson Green in the ITV series Soldier Soldier. After Flynn and Green performed Unchained Melody on the programme, ITV was inundated by people looking to buy the song, and the pair were persuaded by record producer Simon Cowell to record it and release it as a single, a double A-side with White Cliffs of Dover. The single was released under the name Robson & Jerome and reached number one in the UK chart in 1995. It stayed at No.1 for 7 weeks in the UK Singles Chart, selling more than 1.9 million copies, and making it the best-selling single of the year, and winning the duo the Music Week Awards in 1996 for best single and best album. The duo had two more number one hits in 1995 and 1996 with "I Believe" and "What Becomes of the Brokenhearted" both re-makes of standards, they also produced two number one albums.

In 1997, he starred as Eddie Wallis, alongside singing partner Robson Green, in the comedy-drama Ain't Misbehavin. In 1999, Flynn starred in the short-lived police show Badger, played real-life footballer Bobby Charlton in the film Best, played Tommy Cooper in Jus' Like That, a tribute to the late comic, written by John Fisher and directed by Simon Callow.

In 2007, Flynn having semi-retired from acting and moved to Pembrokeshire, directed and starred in the low budget film Rude Tales. The film was split into a series of short stories centred in the lead character, Jerome Rude, played by Flynn. In July 2010, after almost 10 years away from acting, it was confirmed that Flynn would be playing the role of Bronn in the HBO television series Game of Thrones. He continued the role for nine years until 2019.

Flynn provides the voice of Daniel (the hound) in the children's television show Tommy Zoom. In 2012, Flynn stars alongside Matthew Macfadyen in four series of Ripper Street for the BBC.

In 2016, Flynn appeared in "Shut Up and Dance", an episode of the anthology series Black Mirror. In 2017, he was the voice of Dr. Gachet in the film Loving Vincent.

In 2019, in an interview, Flynn revealed that he had been cast in Amazon Prime Video's upcoming series adaptation of Stephen King's The Dark Tower series in an unannounced role.

In 2021, Flynn portrayed Neil Wallis specialist in crisis management in the BBC1 television drama film The Trick, based on the true story about Climategate. In 2022, he starred alongside Harrison Ford and Helen Mirren, playing Scottish sheep farmer, Banner Creighton in Taylor Sheridan’s 1923. In 2025, Flynn portrayed an MI6 officer Boris Oliver in the Indian-Malayalam action thriller film L2: Empuraan, directed by Prithviraj Sukumaran.

== Personal life ==
Vegetarian since the age of 18, Flynn is a patron of the Vegetarian Society and Compassion in World Farming. He has joined PETA in advocating the vegan lifestyle he himself lives by. In December 2018, Flynn joined the board of directors of VeganNation, an Israeli-based vegan lifestyle project that aims to create an ‘international vegan economy based on a virtual currency, the VeganCoin.” Flynn has narrated several Sleep Stories for the Calm App and is an advocate for Meditation and Mindfulness. Flynn acts as patron for the Mindfulness in Schools Project.

Having taken childhood holidays in Pembrokeshire, Wales with his family, as a then follower of Ratu Bagus, a form of meditation, Flynn and some friends moved to a Georgian house there in the late 1990s, where he still lived in 2014.

Flynn was in a brief relationship with Game of Thrones co-star Lena Headey, which ended in 2014; the two have not been on speaking terms since that year.

== Filmography ==
=== Film ===
Year	Title	Role	Notes
1988	A Summer Story	Joe Narracombe	
1988	To Kill a Priest	Traffic militiaman	
1991	Edward II	Edmund of Woodstock, 1st Earl of Kent	
1991	Kafka	Castle Attendant	
2000	Best	Bobby Charlton	
2007	Rude Tales	Jerome Rude	
2013	Dante's Daemon	Fisherman	
2017	Loving Vincent	Dr Gachet	
2019	John Wick: Chapter 3 – Parabellum	Berrada	
2025	L2: Empuraan	Boris Oliver	Indian-Malayalam language film

=== Television ===
Year	Title	Role	Notes
1985	American Playhouse	Kurt	Episode: "Displaced Person"
1986	Screen Two	Nigel	Episode: "The Russian Soldier"
1986	The Monocled Mutineer	Franny	Episodes: "When the Hurly-Burly's Done", "Before the Shambles"
1986	Breaking Up	John Mailer	
1986	London's Burning: The Movie	Kenny 'Rambo' Baines	TV movie
1988	Troubles	Matthews	TV miniseries
1988	The Fear	Freddie	
1989	Flying Lady	Benny Barton	Episode: "The Trip"
1990	Bergerac	Alan Bruton	Episode: "Under Wraps"
1991	Casualty	Alan Deacon	Episode: "Living in Hope"
1991	Boon	Chris Shepley	Episode: "Lie of the Land"
1991–1995	Soldier Soldier	Patrick "Paddy" Garvey	
1992	Between the Lines	Eddie Hargreaves	6 episodes
1993	Don't Leave Me This Way	Tony Fleming	TV movie
1995	A Mind to Murder	Peter Nagle	TV movie
1997	Ain't Misbehavin'	Eddie Wallis	TV miniseries
1999	The Ruth Rendell Mysteries	Martin Urban	Episode: "The Lake of Darkness"
1999–2000	Badger	Tom McCabe	
2007	Tommy Zoom	Daniel	Voice role
2011–2019	Game of Thrones	Bronn	36 episodes
2012–2016	Ripper Street	Bennet Drake	31 episodes
2016	Black Mirror	Hector	Episode: "Shut Up and Dance"
2022	1923	Banner Creighton	Miniseries
2023	The Change	Pig Man	TV series

== Awards and nominations ==
Year	Award	Category	Work	Result
2011	Screen Actors Guild Award	Outstanding Performance by an Ensemble in a Drama Series	Game of Thrones	Nominated
2013	British Academy Television Awards	Best Supporting Actor	Ripper Street	Nominated
2015	Screen Actors Guild Award	Outstanding Performance by an Ensemble in a Drama Series	Game of Thrones	Nominated
