= King Kong Groover =

Studio album by Babylon Zoo
- Released: 8 February 1999
- Genre: Glam rock
- Length: 48:22; 59:14 (Japan edition)
- Label: EMI
- Producer: Jas Mann

Babylon Zoo chronology
The Boy with the X-Ray Eyes (1996)	King Kong Groover (1999)	Love Lies Bleeding (single) (2000)

King Kong Groover is the second and final album by Babylon Zoo, released on 26 February 1999. It met with negative reviews and was a commercial flop. The singles from the album were "All the Money's Gone", which peaked at #46 on the UK Singles Chart, and a cover of Mott the Hoople's "Honaloochie Boogie", which was issued as a promotional single in France (plans for an international release were abandoned).

The song "Chrome Invader" was originally called "Silver Surfer" but had to be changed for copyright reasons. The Japanese version of the album includes two bonus tracks: an acoustic cover of T.Rex's "Cosmic Dancer" and a remix of "The Boy with the X-Ray Eyes".

== Commercial performance ==
An "abject failure", King Kong Groover sold less than 10,000 copies and did not chart.

== Critical reception ==
Professional ratings
Review scores
Source	Rating
AllMusic	4/5 stars
Dotmusic	4/10 stars
Gaffa	3/6 stars
The Guardian	2/5 stars
NME	1/10
The Press	1/5 stars
Scotland on Sunday	1/5 stars
Uncut	3/5 stars
The Virgin Encyclopedia of Nineties Music	3/5 stars

King Kong Groover met with negative reviews. NME scored the album one out of ten, calling it a "slickly produced machiavellian plundering of pop classics" and a "clumsy effort to resurrect a career that was a fluke in the first place." In the Scotland on Sunday, Colin Somerville awarded the record one star out of five. He argued that "Bikini Machine" plagiarises The Beatles' "Across the Universe", and concluded: "Sadly lacking in anything even remotely approaching originality, King Kong Groover is the sound of a career spinning into terminal decline." Dotmusic felt that none of the songs match the "futuristic kick" of Babylon Zoo's 1996 debut single, "Spaceman".

Some critics offered scant praise. Caroline Sullivan of The Guardian wrote that bandleader Jas Mann is "shrill and fun, but lacking the depth to take him beyond 'Spaceman'." In the Sunday Tribune, Anna Carey described King Kong Groover as "sub-Bowie" and "stupid", and "Manhattan Martian" a "piss-poor rip off of 'Starman'." She allowed, however, that the record is "hard to hate". Kevin Courtney of The Irish Times found the record to be a marked improvement over predecessor The Boy with the X-Ray Eyes (1996), but noted that despite its "[aspirations] to Ziggy Stardust-era elevation, Babylon Zoo are still tied down by too many threadbare ideas".

In a favourable retrospective review, AllMusic's Dave Thompson said that while there is "nothing in sight to even approach the peaks that their debut hit 'Spaceman' attained", the album has "yearning majesty" and "neo-operatic flair". Virgin Encyclopedia of Nineties Music author Colin Larkin was mildly positive, but remarked that Mann's "full-on adoption of glam rock... appeared too late to cash in on the attendant furore surrounding Todd Haynes' genre tribute, Velvet Goldmine."

== Track listing ==
All tracks written by Jas Mann except where noted.

1. "All the Money's Gone" – 3:46
2. "Manhattan Martian" – 6:01
3. "Honaloochie Boogie" (Ian Hunter) – 3:28
4. "Honeymoon in Space" – 4:53
5. "Stereo Superstar" – 3:39
6. "Chrome Invader" – 5:03
7. "Bikini Machine" – 3:55
8. "Are You a Boy or a Girl?" – 5:05
9. "Hey Man" – 5:34
10. "Aroma Girl" – 6:58
11. "The Boy with the X-Ray Eyes" (Armageddon Babylon mix) (Japanese version only) – 5:54
12. "Cosmic Dancer" (Marc Bolan) (Japanese version only) – 4:58
