= List of UK Albums Chart Christmas number ones =

The Beatles have released seven Christmas number one albums, more than any other act.

The UK Albums Chart is a weekly record chart based on sales of albums in the United Kingdom; the term "Christmas number ones" refers to the records that are at the top of the chart on Christmas Day. Typically, the Christmas number one is the album that was announced as number one on the Sunday before 25 December. When Christmas Day falls on a Sunday itself, the official number one is the one announced on that day's chart. As of December 2023, 65 albums have been Christmas number ones.

The UK Albums Chart is based on Sunday to Saturday sales of both physical and digital albums. It is compiled by the Official Charts Company (OCC) on behalf of the UK music industry, and each week's new number one is first announced on Sunday evenings on The Radio 1 Chart Show. The album chart was first published by Record Mirror in 1956. The record at number one on 25 December that year was the original soundtrack to the 1956 film The King and I, making it the first ever UK Christmas number one album; The King and I soundtrack was also Christmas number one in 1957, the following year. In 1958, the original soundtrack to South Pacific became the second Christmas number one album. Staying at the top of the album chart for a total of 115 weeks, it was also number one in 1959 and 1960. Soundtracks to the movies The Sound of Music and Grease also became Christmas number ones.

Record labels earn as much as forty per cent of their annual sales during the festive season. Speaking in 2009, music retailer Geoff Bonouvrie remarked: "The whole psychology of buying changes around Christmas. ... People's buying habits change. They are buying gifts for other people." As a result of this, topping the album chart for 25 December is considered prestigious among the industry, as Christmas number one albums often sell in high quantities. Between 1986 and 2012, 23 of the 27 Christmas number one albums were featured in the top three of their respective year-end bestsellers chart.

Betting shops in the UK often run books regarding which albums will be at number one for Christmas. For example, in 2010, British bookmakers William Hill and Ladbrokes both issued odds of 2/5 on for Take That to top the album chart at Christmas. At the time, these were the lowest odds William Hill had ever offered for a prediction on the Christmas number-one album. In 2011, Christmas by Canadian singer Michael Bublé became the Christmas number one. In a statement, Bublé announced that he was "thrilled" to have achieved the feat. The following year, Scottish singer-songwriter Emeli Sandé topped the chart at Christmas. The 2014 Christmas number one was claimed by Ed Sheeran, who achieved the biggest one-week sales of any artist album that year with X; the next year, 25 by Adele topped the Christmas chart with sales of 450,000.

Following the December 1983 release of the first album in the Now That's What I Call Music series, compilation albums featuring various artists became very popular in the UK during the mid to late 1980s; this is reflected in the albums that were Christmas number one during this time. From 1983 to 1987, every album at the top of the Christmas chart was a various artists compilation album, from either the Now That's What I Call Music or the Hits series. The UK Albums Chart was subsequently altered so that, from 14 January 1989, releases from various artists were no longer eligible for the main album chart.

== Number ones ==
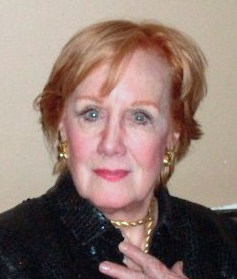
Singer Marni Nixon provided vocals on the soundtrack album to The King and I, the first album ever to top the UK Albums Chart at Christmas.

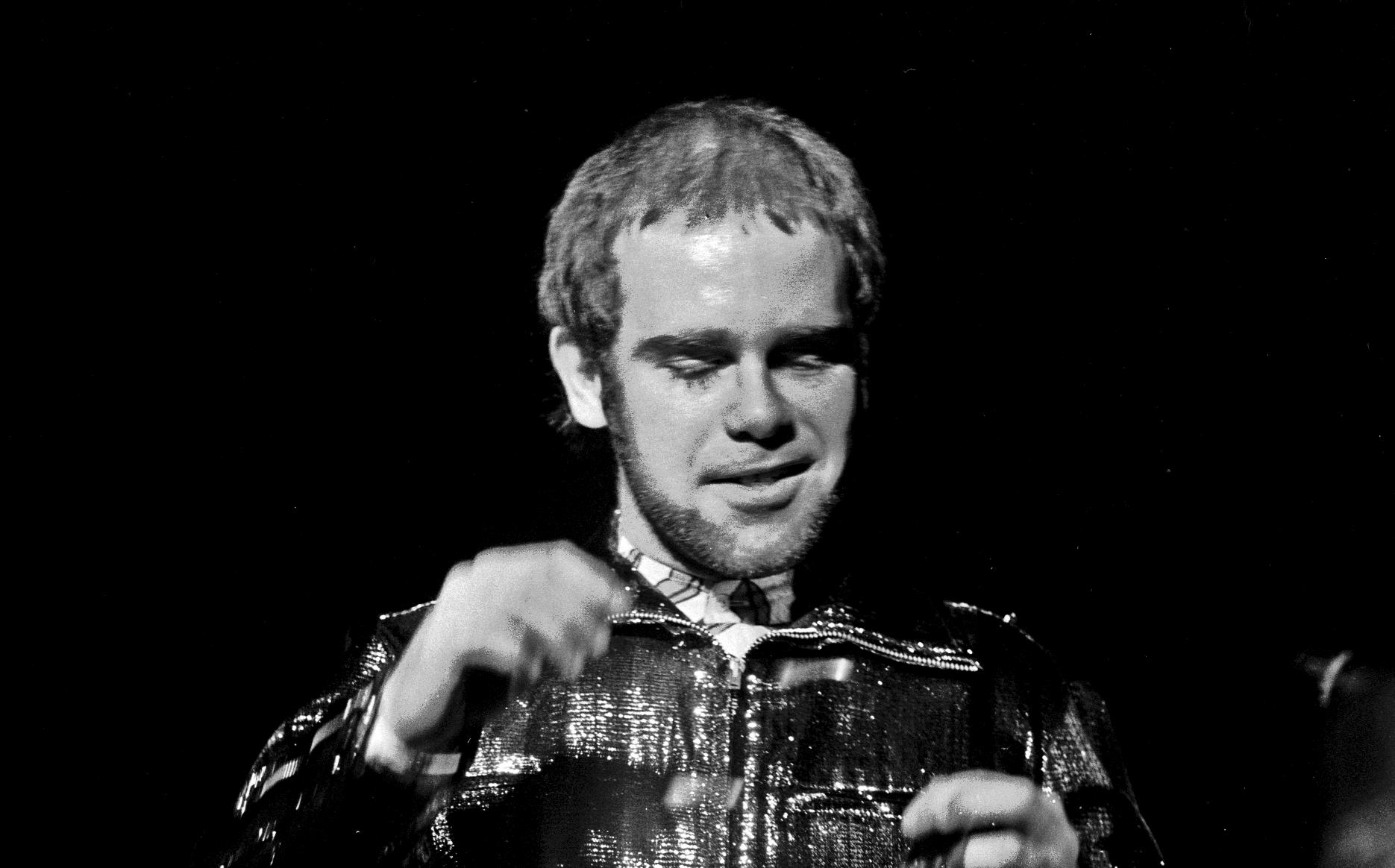
Elton John has topped the albums chart twice at Christmas, in consecutive years.

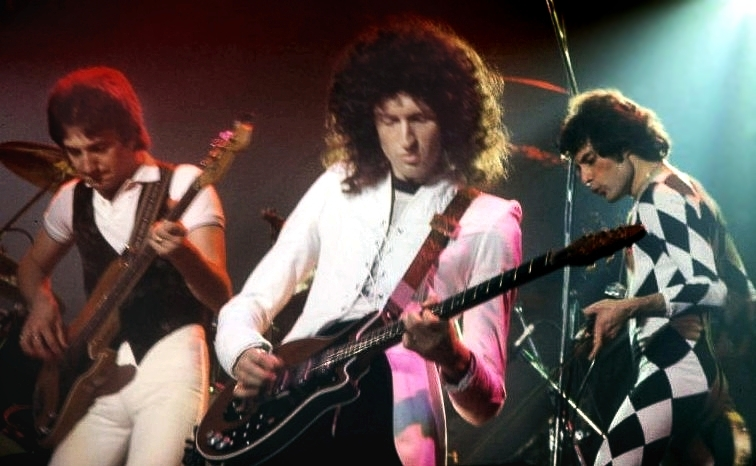
Queen have released two Christmas number one albums, in 1975 and 1991.

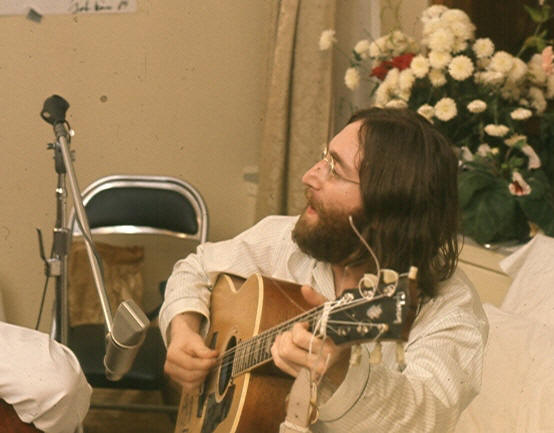
John Lennon posthumously achieved a solo Christmas number one in 1982 with The John Lennon Collection.

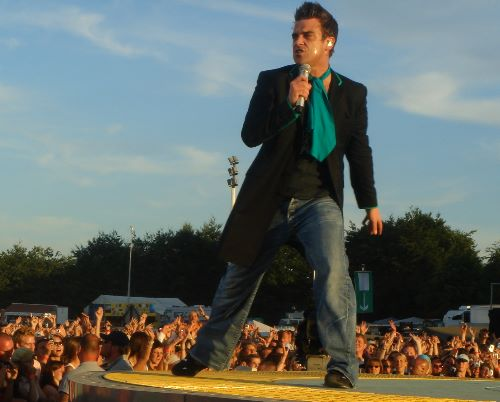
Robbie Williams has topped the UK Albums Chart four times at Christmas.

As of December 2019, there have been 61 Christmas number one albums. The most successful act is The Beatles, who have topped the Christmas chart with seven different albums. With the exception of 1966, they reached number one on every Christmas chart from 1963 to 1969, and also topped the chart in 2000 with their singles collection, 1. The only other act to release more than three Christmas number one albums is British singer Robbie Williams, who has topped the chart with four solo albums. Williams also featured as part of Take That on their 2010 album, Progress. Take That have had three Christmas number one albums.

The most successful record label is Virgin Records, who have released eight Christmas number one albums. Benefitting from sales of the Now That's What I Call Music! compilation series, Virgin achieved four of the five Christmas number ones between 1983 and 1987. From 14 January 1989, compilation albums featuring various artists were no longer included in the UK Albums Chart.

Year	Artist	Album	Record label (Note: The record labels are those given by the OCC.)	Weeks at number one
1956	Motion Picture Cast Recording	The King and I	Capitol	48
1957	Motion Picture Cast Recording	The King and I	Capitol	48
1958	Motion Picture Cast Recording	South Pacific	RCA Victor	115
1959	Motion Picture Cast Recording	South Pacific	RCA Victor	115
1960	Motion Picture Cast Recording	South Pacific	RCA Victor	115
1961	George Mitchell Minstrels	Another Black and White Minstrel Show	His Master's Voice	8
1962	George Mitchell Minstrels	The Black and White Minstrel Show	His Master's Voice	9
1963	The Beatles	With the Beatles	Parlophone	21
1964	The Beatles	Beatles for Sale	Parlophone	11
1965	The Beatles	Rubber Soul	Parlophone	8
1966	Motion Picture Cast Recording	The Sound of Music	RCA Victor	70
1967	The Beatles	Sgt. Pepper's Lonely Hearts Club Band	Parlophone	27
1968	The Beatles	The Beatles (White Album)	Apple	8
1969	The Beatles	Abbey Road	Apple	17
1970	Andy Williams	Andy Williams' Greatest Hits	CBS	5
1971	T. Rex	Electric Warrior	Fly	8
1972	Various artists	20 All Time Hits of the 50s	K-tel	11
1973	Elton John	Goodbye Yellow Brick Road	DJM	2
1974	Elton John	Elton John's Greatest Hits	DJM	11
1975	Queen	A Night at the Opera	EMI	4
1976	Glen Campbell	Glen Campbell's Twenty Golden Greats	Capitol	6
1977	Various artists	Disco Fever	K-tel	6
1978	Original soundtrack	Grease: The Original Soundtrack from the Motion Picture	RSO	13
1979	Rod Stewart	Greatest Hits, Vol. 1	Riva	5
1980	ABBA	Super Trouper	Epic	9
1981	ABBA	The Visitors	Epic	3
1982	John Lennon	The John Lennon Collection	Parlophone	6
1983	Various artists	Now That's What I Call Music	Virgin/EMI	5
1984	Various artists	Hits 1	CBS/WEA	7
1985	Various artists	Now – The Christmas Album	Virgin/EMI	2
1986	Various artists	Now That's What I Call Music 8	Virgin/EMI/PolyGram	6
1987	Various artists	Now That's What I Call Music 10	Virgin/EMI/PolyGram	6
1988	Cliff Richard	Private Collection: 1979–1988 (Note: Private Collection: 1979–1988 was announced as the 1988 Christmas number one a day later than usual, on Monday 26 December.)	EMI	2
1989	Phil Collins	...But Seriously	Virgin	15
1990	Madonna	The Immaculate Collection	Sire	9
1991	Queen	Greatest Hits II	Parlophone	5
1992	Cher	Greatest Hits: 1965–1992	Geffen	7
1993	Meat Loaf	Bat Out of Hell II: Back into Hell	Virgin	11
1994	The Beautiful South	Carry On Up the Charts	Go! Discs	7
1995	Robson & Jerome	Robson & Jerome	RCA	7
1996	Spice Girls	Spice	Virgin	15
1997	Céline Dion	Let's Talk About Love	Epic	4
1998	George Michael	Ladies & Gentlemen: The Best of George Michael	Epic	8
1999	Shania Twain	Come On Over	Mercury	11
2000	The Beatles	1	Apple	9
2001	Robbie Williams	Swing When You're Winning	Chrysalis	7
2002	Robbie Williams	Escapology	EMI	7
2003	Dido	Life for Rent	Cheeky	10
2004	Robbie Williams	Greatest Hits	Chrysalis	4
2005	Eminem	Curtain Call: The Hits	Interscope	5
2006	Take That	Beautiful World	Polydor	8
2007	Leona Lewis	Spirit	Syco	8
2008	Take That	The Circus	Polydor	5
2009	Susan Boyle	I Dreamed a Dream	Syco	4
2010	Take That	Progress	Polydor	7
2011	Michael Bublé	Christmas	Reprise	3
2012	Emeli Sandé	Our Version of Events	Virgin	10
2013	Robbie Williams	Swings Both Ways	Island	4
2014	Ed Sheeran	X	Asylum	13
2015	Adele	25	XL	13
2016	Michael Ball & Alfie Boe	Together	Decca	2
2017	Eminem	Revival	Interscope	1
2018	Motion Picture Cast Recording	The Greatest Showman	Atlantic	25
2019	Rod Stewart	You're in My Heart	Rhino	3
2020	Paul McCartney	McCartney III	Capitol	1
2021	Adele	30	Columbia	5
2022	Taylor Swift	Midnights	Republic	5
2023	The Rolling Stones	Hackney Diamonds	Polydor	5
2024	Sabrina Carpenter	Short n' Sweet	Island	2
2025	Pink Floyd	Wish You Were Here	Harvest (Note: Columbia released the 2025 reissue Wish You Were Here 50 – the original album was released by Harvest.)	2 (Note: Including a week in October 1975.)
