= The Sandkings (band) =

British band

- Origin: Wolverhampton, England
- Genre: Alternative rock
- Years active: 1987–1992; 2025–
- Labels: London Records; Long Beach Records; Revolver Records
- Members: Dave Brown; Glenn Dodd; Terry Kirkbride; Vincent Cocker
- Past members: Andy Parton; Jas Mann; Neil Clitheroe

The Sandkings are an indie pop music band from Wolverhampton, England who had minor success in the late 1980s and early 1990s.

They were named after a 1981 collection of sci-fi short stories by George R. R. Martin (called Sandkings).

Their first four singles were released on their own Long Beach Records – the first, "Rain", featured a singer called Andy Parton, before they recruited Jas Mann as their lead vocalist. They toured with other West Midlands bands including The Wonder Stuff, Pop Will Eat Itself and Ned's Atomic Dustbin as well as being the opening act for Happy Mondays and The Stone Roses in the early 1990s.

Mann left the band in 1992 because of creative differences, and they disbanded. Mann went on to form Babylon Zoo who had a No. 1 single with "Spaceman" in over 20 countries in 1996. Dodd went on to form Gravity Wheel with Brown and Producer/DJ Lee 'Peza' Perry, and released several critically acclaimed singles "WSH", "Tears in the Rain", and "U Mudda U", as well as the album Bulldogtunawasp. They also provided several re-mixes for other artists. Kirkbride went on to play for Southern Fly and Proud Mary, as well as touring the world with a solo Noel Gallagher (Oasis). He also is credited as playing on Oasis' album Don't Believe the Truth, and Paul Weller's 22 Dreams.

The band reformed in 2025. Original members Dodd, Brown and Kirkbride with newly recruited vocalist Vincent Cocker played to a sold-out show at Wolverhampton Arts Centre.

== Band members ==
- Current members
- Vincent Cocker: vocals (2025-present)
- Dave Brown: bass guitar (1987-1992, 2025-present)
- Glenn Dodd: guitar, backing vocals (1987–1992, 2025-present)
- Terry Kirkbride: drums, tambourine, backing vocals (1988–1992, 2025-present)
- Past members
- Neil Clitheroe: drums (1987-1988)
- Jas Mann: vocals, guitar (1988-1992)
- Andy Parton: vocals (1987-1988)

== Discography ==
=== Singles ===
- "Rain" – 1988 – released on Long Beach Records (BEACH 1)
- "Hope Springs Eternal" – 1988 – 12" single released on Long Beach Records (BEACH 2)
- "All's Well with the World" – August 1989 – 7" and 12" singles released on Long Beach Records (BEACH 3)
- "Circles" / "Need To Know" – 1990 – Double A-side 12" single released on Long Beach Records (BEACH 4)-UK no. 122
- "Earthwheel" – 1990 – 7", 12" and CD single, released on Sugarbeach Records – UK no. 130
- "Temple Redneck" – 1991 – 12" and CD single released on London Records – UK no. 100
- "Shake Your Head" – 1991 – 12" and CD single, released on London Records. Featured live cover version of "Tomorrow Never Knows" a song from Revolver by The Beatles.- UK no. 102
- "Let It Grow EP" – 1992 – 12" and CD single released on London Records – UK no. 102
- "Pin Stripe Ghetto" – 1992 – 12" and CD single released on London Records

=== Albums ===
- Welcome to England – 1992 – Vinyl LP, Cassette and CD album released on London Records

=== Compilations ===
- "Anthology 1 : 1987-1989" – 2022 – CD released on Revolver Records
- "Anthology 2 : 1990-1991" – 2022 – CD released on Revolver Records
- "Anthology 3 : 1991-1992" – 2023 – CD released on Revolver Records
