= Clive Black =

British music publishing executive

- Occupation: Music executive
- Years active: 1980–present

Clive Black, is a British music executive. He is the founder of Blacklist Entertainment, and former managing director at EMI.

== Career ==
Black started his career at 16 years old, as a junior for Island Records in 1980, but moved into A&R. He was the scout responsible for signing Mark Hollis, lead singer and principal songwriter of the band Talk Talk, to Island Publishing. He also set up the dance label Positiva Records.

Black then worked as Director of A&R at EMI, followed by Warner Music Group, before returning to EMI as Managing Director. He signed and released several UK number one singles such as Return of the Mack by Mark Morrison, Spaceman by Babylon Zoo, Something's Gotten Hold of My Heart by Marc Almond, I Wanna Be the Only One by Eternal, and Sleeping Satellite by Tasmin Archer. Throughout his career, Black has worked closely with artists such as Kate Bush, Cliff Richard, Kraftwerk, Afrika Bambaataa, Robert Palmer and Robbie Williams.

In 1997 he set up Blacklist Entertainment as a joint venture with Edel, and later took sole ownership in a management buy-out.

In 1998, he set up a new record label with Cliff Richards called Blacknight Productions.
