= Ain't Misbehavin' (serial) =

- Genre: Comedy drama
- Written by: Norman Stone; Bob Larbey
- Directed by: Norman Stone
- Starring: Jerome Flynn; Robson Green; Julia Sawalha; Warren Mitchell; Jim Carter
- Country of origin: United Kingdom
- Original language: English
- No. of series: 1
- No. of episodes: 3

Production
- Executive producer: Norman Stone
- Producer: George Gallaccio
- Running time: 60 minutes (with commercials)
- Production companies: Clapp Trapp Productions; Anglia Television

Original release
- Network: ITV
- Release: 28 July – 11 August 1997

Ain't Misbehavin' is a British three-part television comedy-drama serial by Norman Stone and Bob Larbey, that starred Jerome Flynn, Robson Green, Julia Sawalha, Warren Mitchell and Jim Carter. Three episodes were produced by Clapp Trapp Productions for Anglia Television, and were broadcast on the ITV network from 28 July to 11 August 1997.

== Plot ==
Set in London during the Second World War at the height of the Blitz in 1940, the story follows the misadventures of Eddie Wallis (Jerome Flynn) and Eric Trapp (Robson Green). Wallis finds himself back in civilian life, after being medically discharged from the RAF, following injuries sustained when he crashed landed a Blenheim bomber. Eddie tries to make a living as a saxophonist on the big band circuit and soon joins the Ray Smiles Big Band, where meets double-bass player Eric Trapp, a womanising and egocentric spiv who dabbles in black markeetering and will do anything to avoid conscription. He also runs a private detective agency, and is soon commissioned by local gang boss Maxie Morrell (Jim Carter) to investigate the nefarious dealings of his rival Malky Fraser (James Cosmo) and uncover an underworld scheme involving the pilfering of the country's wartime survival supplies from a MoD depot. Meanwhile, Eddie desperately tries to win the affection of upper-crust Red Cross nurse Dolly Nightingale (Julia Sawalha), while he encounters setbacks along the way.

== Cast ==
- Jerome Flynn as Eddie Wallis
- Robson Green as Eric Trapp
- Julia Sawalha as Dolly Nightingale
- Warren Mitchell as Ray Smiles
- Jim Carter as Maxie Morrell
- James Cosmo as Malky Fraser
- Roy Donachie as Billy the Book
- Graham Stark as Spadger
- Jane Lapotaire as Clara Van Trapp
- Tom Beard as Roger Horace-Brown
- Campbell Morrison as Flight Sgt. Fullerton
- Heidi Monsen as Mavis Johnson
- Joe Caffrey as Corporal Jennings
- Danny Dyer as Young Ronnie
- Terry Mortimer as Chas
- June Brown as Mrs Jilkes
- Trevor Fox as Albert
- Peter Cellier as George Nightingale
- George Melly as Bing Williams
- Barbara Durkin as Rita
- Annette Badland as Anna
- Trevor Martin as Group Captain
- John D. Collins as Medical Officer

== Background ==
After appearing together in five series of Soldier Soldier, actors Robson Green and Jerome Flynn signed a recording contract, working together as pop duo Robson & Jerome, subsequently releasing three successful singles all of which went to No.1 in the UK singles charts. The music video for their cover of Unchained Melody was produced in the style of the film Brief Encounter (1945) and was directed by Norman Stone. Upon seeing the results, Stone was inspired after seeing Green and Robson in trench coats and trilbies, he approached the actors about the possibility of doing a series set in the 1940s. Subsequently they teamed up with Stone and his business partner Pete Bigg and together set up Clapp Trapp Productions, they pitched their ideas for the series to ITV, who immediately jumped at the idea and commissioned the series.

== Episodes ==
No.	Title	Original release date
1	"Episode 1"	28 July 1997
After sustaining injuries following a crash landing, pilot Eddie Wallis is discharged from the RAF on medical grounds. Feeling dejected, he travels back to London, during the train journey he becomes acquainted with Dolly Nightingale. Walking through the streets of London, he accidentally bumps into Eric Trapp who is on the run from a pursuing soldier after spending the night with his wife. Eric promptly hands Eddie his double-bass case and scarpers, the soldier subsequently gives Eddie a black eye for his troubles. Eddie eventually finds the address of the rehearsal rooms where the Ray Smiles Big Band are based, he bursts in and angrily confronts Eric. Band leader Ray discovers a saxophone in Eddie's luggage and enquires about his experience, he subsequently offers him a place in the band which Eddie readily accepts. Meanwhile local gang boss Maxie Morrell wants to find out more about the nefarious dealings of his rival Malky Fraser and asks his niece Mavis to persuade Eric to investigate, on the false pretence of probing into the blackmailing of her 'husband' by Scottish mobster Billy the Book. Eric falls for her tall story and generous financial incentive, he agrees to take up the case.
2	"Episode 2"	4 August 1997
The untimely demise of the band's singer Bing Williams leads to an opening for Eddie and Eric as they manage to secure a top billing singing spot in the band. To his dismay, Eric discovers that he has been roped in by Maxie into investigating the disreputable underworld scheme organised by Malky Fraser's gang of Glasweigan mobsters. Eric breaks into their compound, he accidentally wakes Billy up while checking for clues and is chased into a van which then journeys onto a MoD depot. Emerging within the base, he finds out that the mobsters have been secretly infiltrating the depot through their informer Flight Sgt. Fullerton in order to steal shipments of vital wartime supplies. Eric reports back to Maxie about his findings, Maxie commandeers Eric to persuade Eddie in assisting him with his investigations, due to the latter's experience with the military. Eddie continues in his attempts to win the affections of Dolly despite she being engaged to Roger Horace-Brown. Following a gig one night, he serenades her as she returns from work and they quickly find themselves in a bombing raid, and later take part in assisting with the recovering of the casualties.
3	"Episode 3"	11 August 1997
Dolly invites Eddie to a RAF social event, desperate not to reveal his discommisioned status he asks for Eric's help. He supplies them with counterfeit RAF uniforms which unbeknowst to Eddie, they have been produced by Maxie in order for them to infiltrate the MoD depot in disguise. Eric and Eddie bluff their way into the gathering, and soon Eddie's cover is blown when Roger's colleague recognises the pair as the musicians he saw performing at the club the other night. On the journey back, Eric reveals his side of the bargain and lures Eddie to the MoD depot where he discloses the full extent of his investigations. While Eddie is initially enraged by Eric's act of deception, he reluctantly decides to help him when he discovers what is at stake. He searches through the office hoping to find incriminating paperwork when Corporal Jennings accosts him at gunpoint. Jennings is fooled by the insignia on Eddie's uniform and decides to hand over the documents. As Eddie and Eric leave the vicinity, Fullerton recognises their ruse and raises the alarm. Subsequently, the duo flee under a hail of bullets from pursuing guardsmen.

== Home media ==
The series was initially released on VHS by BMG Video in 1997. It was subsequently released on DVD as part of the Robson Green: A Trilogy boxset by John Williams Productions on 28 May 2007.
