= List of best-selling albums by year in the United Kingdom =

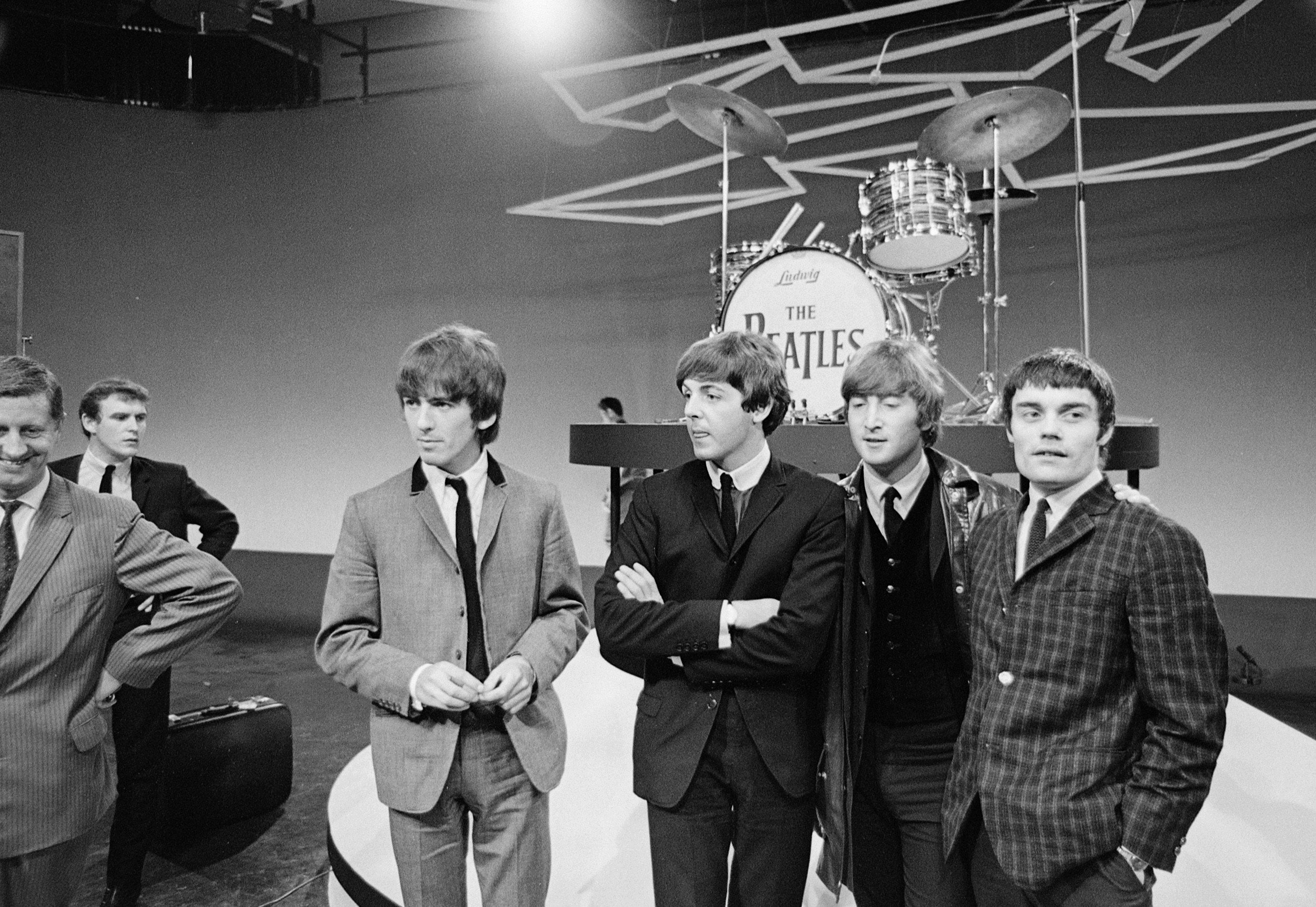
The Beatles went on to earn the most best-selling albums of the year, five times with With the Beatles (1963), Beatles for Sale (1964), Sgt. Pepper's Lonely Hearts Club Band (1967), Abbey Road (1969) and 1 (2000).

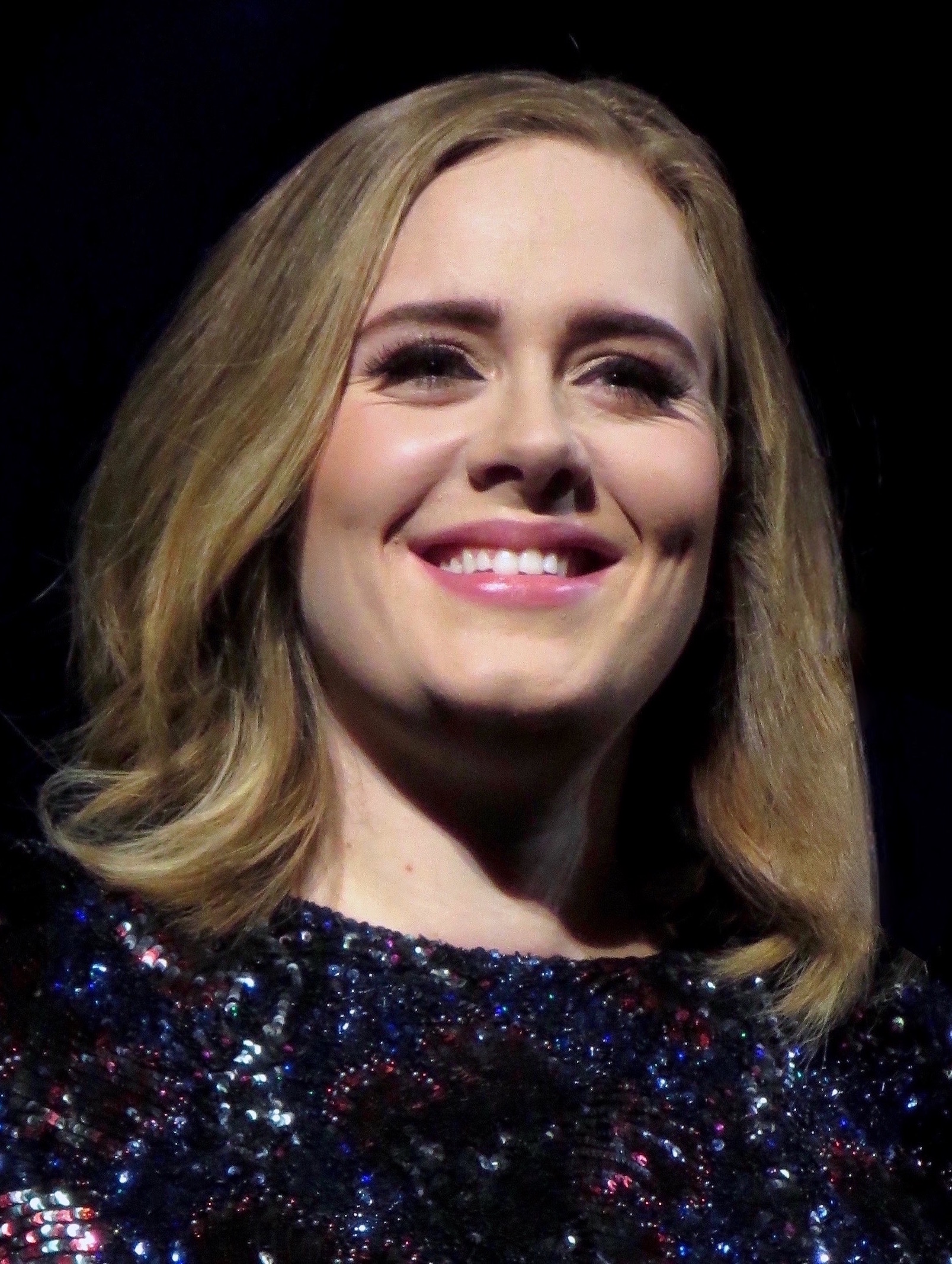
Adele had the best-selling album four times, the most for a female artist with 21 (2011), 25 (2015, 2016) and 30 (2021).

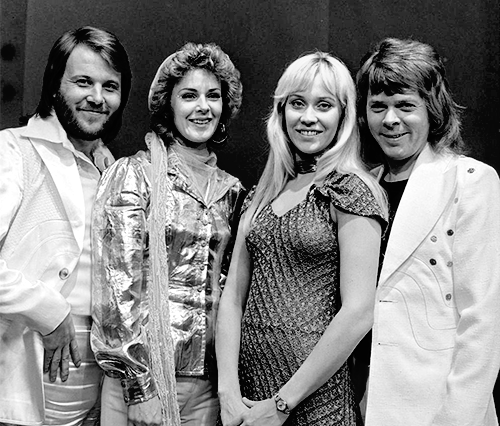
ABBA had the best-selling album of the year three times with Greatest Hits (1976), Arrival (1977) and Super Trouper (1980).

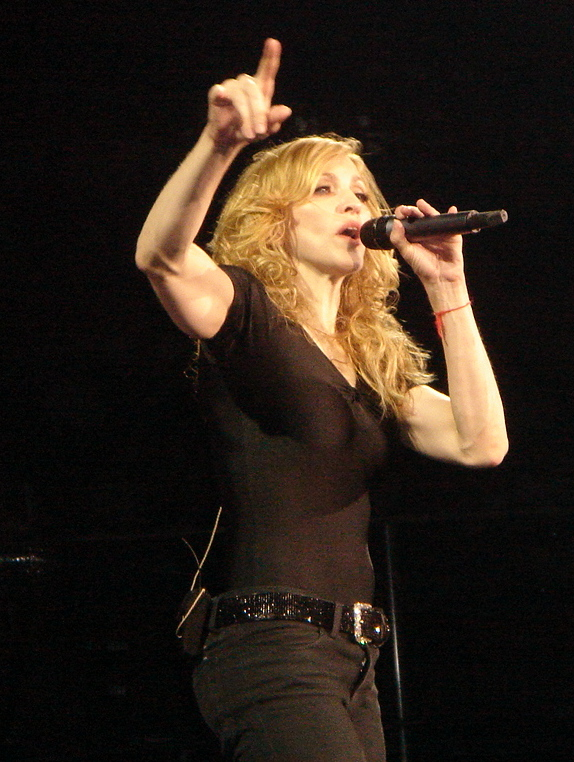
Madonna had the best-selling album of 1986 with True Blue.

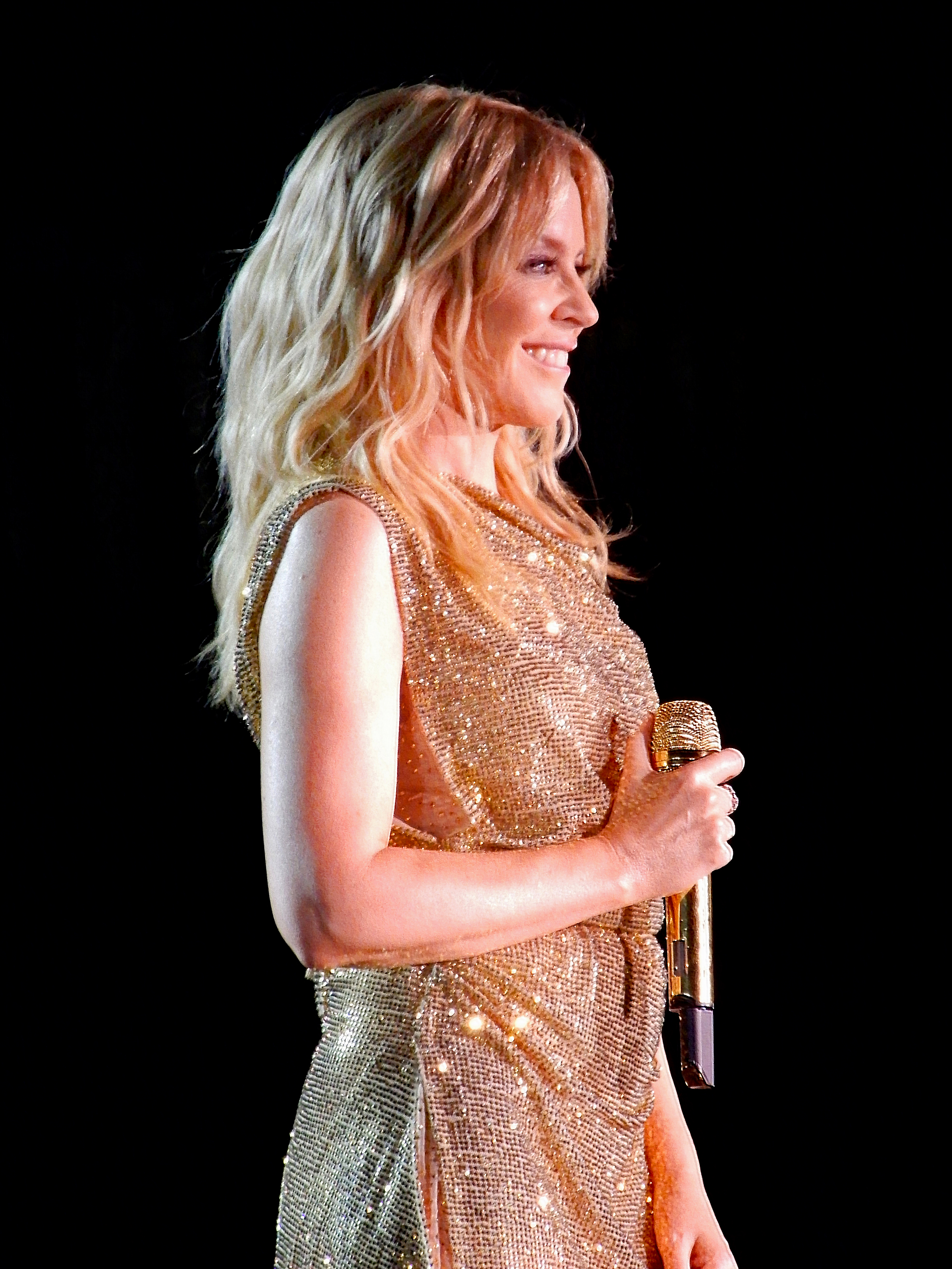
Kylie Minogue had the best-selling album of 1988 with her debut album Kylie.

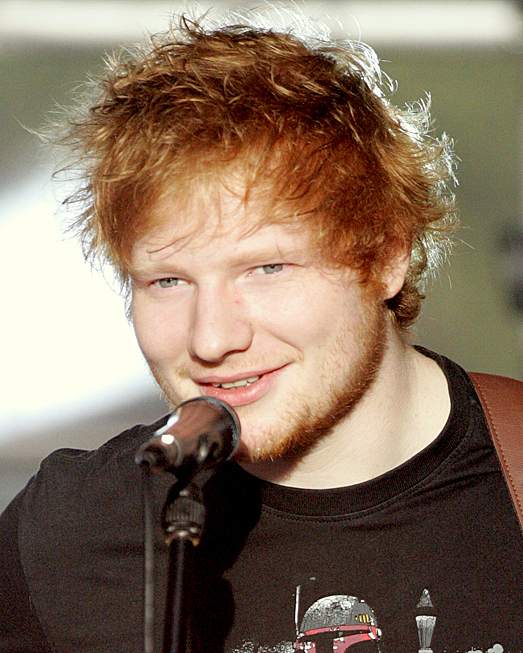
Ed Sheeran has earned the best-selling album of the year twice with X (2014) and ÷ (2017).

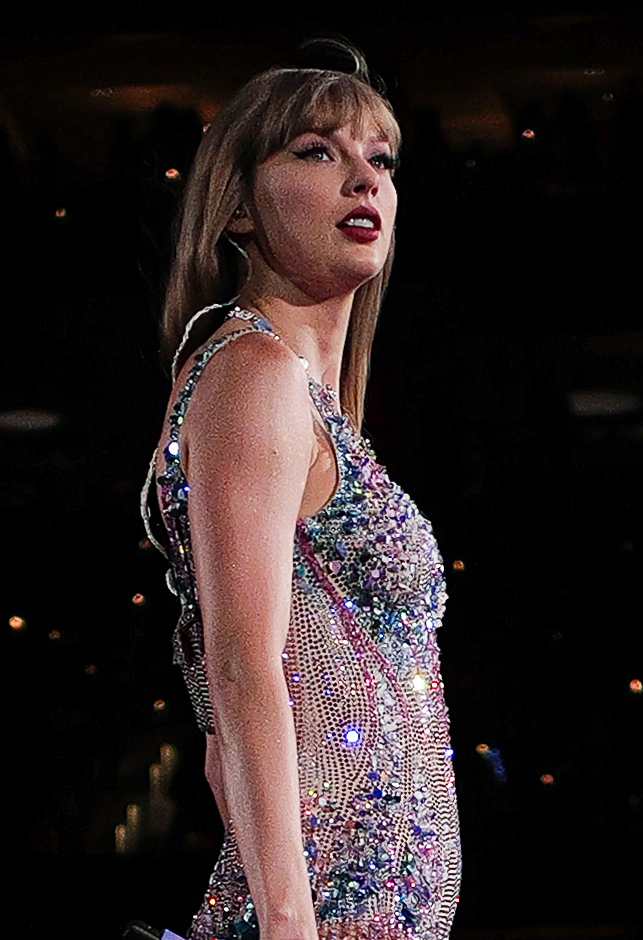
Taylor Swift has earned the best-selling album of the year consecutively with The Tortured Poets Department (2024) and The Life of a Showgirl (2025).

This is a list of the best-selling albums in the United Kingdom each year. The sales figures given are only within that year, but each album has sold more copies overall.

== Best-selling albums by year ==
Year	Album	Artist	Number sold	Ref
1956	Carousel	Original soundtrack		
1957	The King and I	Original soundtrack		
1958	My Fair Lady	Broadway Cast recording		
1959	South Pacific	Original soundtrack		
1960	South Pacific	Original soundtrack		
1961	G.I. Blues	Elvis Presley		
1962	West Side Story	Original soundtrack		
1963	With the Beatles	The Beatles		
1964	Beatles for Sale	The Beatles		
1965	The Sound of Music	Original soundtrack		
1966	The Sound of Music	Original soundtrack		
1967	Sgt. Pepper's Lonely Hearts Club Band	The Beatles	751,000	
1968	The Sound of Music	Original soundtrack		
1969	Abbey Road	The Beatles		
1970	Bridge over Troubled Water	Simon and Garfunkel		
1971	Bridge over Troubled Water	Simon and Garfunkel		
1972	20 Dynamic Hits	Various Artists		
1973	Aladdin Sane	David Bowie		
1974	The Singles: 1969–1973	The Carpenters		
1975	The Best of the Stylistics	The Stylistics		
1976	Greatest Hits	ABBA		
1977	Arrival	ABBA		
1978	Saturday Night Fever	Original soundtrack		
1979	Parallel Lines	Blondie		
1980	Super Trouper	ABBA		
1981	Kings of the Wild Frontier	Adam and the Ants		
1982	Love Songs	Barbra Streisand		
1983	Thriller	Michael Jackson		
1984	Can't Slow Down	Lionel Richie		
1985	Brothers in Arms	Dire Straits		
1986	True Blue	Madonna		
1987	Bad	Michael Jackson		
1988	Kylie	Kylie Minogue		
1989	Ten Good Reasons	Jason Donovan		
1990	...But Seriously	Phil Collins		
1991	Stars	Simply Red		
1992	Stars	Simply Red		
1993	Bat Out of Hell II: Back into Hell	Meat Loaf		
1994	Cross Road	Bon Jovi		
1995	Robson & Jerome	Robson & Jerome	2,040,000	
1996	Jagged Little Pill	Alanis Morissette	1,627,000	
1997	Be Here Now	Oasis	1,740,000	
1998	Talk on Corners	The Corrs	1,676,439	
1999	Come On Over	Shania Twain	2,201,842	
2000	1	The Beatles	1,850,101	
2001	No Angel	Dido	1,920,167	
2002	Escapology	Robbie Williams	1,410,931	
2003	Life for Rent	Dido	2,168,302	
2004	Scissor Sisters	Scissor Sisters	1,594,259	
2005	Back to Bedlam	James Blunt	2,367,758	
2006	Eyes Open	Snow Patrol	1,514,554	
2007	Back to Black	Amy Winehouse	1,883,897	
2008	Rockferry	Duffy	1,685,000	
2009	I Dreamed a Dream	Susan Boyle	1,632,732	
2010	Progress	Take That	1,841,148	
2011	21	Adele	3,772,346	
2012	Our Version of Events	Emeli Sandé	1,393,000	
2013	Midnight Memories	One Direction	685,000	
2014	x	Ed Sheeran	1,689,000	
2015	25	Adele	2,496,000	
2016	25	Adele	753,000	
2017	÷	Ed Sheeran	2,700,000	
2018	The Greatest Showman: Original Motion Picture Soundtrack	Original soundtrack	1,600,000	
2019	Divinely Uninspired to a Hellish Extent	Lewis Capaldi	641,000	
2020	Divinely Uninspired to a Hellish Extent	Lewis Capaldi	456,000	
2021	30	Adele	600,000	
2022	Harry's House	Harry Styles	460,000	
2023	The Highlights	The Weeknd	391,000	
2024	The Tortured Poets Department	Taylor Swift	783,800	
2025	The Life of a Showgirl	Taylor Swift	642,000	

== Best-selling albums by decade ==
Decade	Album	Artist(s)	Number sold	Ref
1950s	South Pacific	Original soundtrack		
1960s	Sgt. Pepper's Lonely Hearts Club Band	The Beatles		
1970s	Bridge over Troubled Water	Simon & Garfunkel		
1980s	Brothers in Arms	Dire Straits		
1990s	(What's the Story) Morning Glory?	Oasis	3,000,000	
2000s	Back to Bedlam	James Blunt	3,200,000	
2010s	21	Adele	5,170,000	

== See also ==
- List of best-selling singles by year in the United Kingdom
- List of best-selling compilation albums by year in the United Kingdom
