= The Fear (1988 TV series) =

- Written by: Paul Hines
- Directed by: Stuart Orme
- Starring: Iain Glen; Susannah Harker
- Theme music composer: Colin Towns
- Country of origin: United Kingdom
- Original language: English
- No. of series: 1
- No. of episodes: 5

Production
- Executive producers: Johnny Goodman; John Hambley
- Producers: Jacky Stoller; Antony Root
- Running time: 60 minutes
- Production company: Euston Films for Thames

Original release
- Network: ITV
- Release: 17 February – 16 March 1988

The Fear is a five-part television drama produced for Thames Television by its subsidiary company Euston Films.

Transmitted on ITV between 17 February and 16 March 1988, The Fear is the story of Carl Galton (Iain Glen), the enterprising leader of a criminal gang running a protection racket in North London. Young and ambitious, Galton represents a new breed of criminal who seeks to expand his underworld empire and takes on the old East End firms. 1980's materialism clashes with old school London villainy as Galton rises to power, yet his ruthlessness carries a personal cost, especially on his wife Linda and best friend Marty.

== Cast ==
- Iain Glen – Carl Galton
- Susannah Harker – Linda
- Anthony Valentine – Tony Slater
- Jesse Birdsall – Marty
- Jerome Flynn – Freddie
- Fergus Brazier – Nicky
- Mario Kalli – Mario
- Denis Lill – George Klein
- Adrian Dunbar – Con
- Linda Marlowe – Pat Klein

== Home media ==
The Fear is available on DVD in the UK through a DVD release from Network. The set includes audio commentaries on two of the five episodes from lead actor Iain Glen, producer Jacky Stoller and director Stuart Orme.
