= The Boy with the X-Ray Eyes =

Studio album by Babylon Zoo
- Released: 5 February 1996
- Recorded: 1995
- Genres: Grunge; alternative rock
- Length: 54:47
- Label: EMI
- Producers: Jas Mann; Steve Power

Babylon Zoo chronology
The Boy with the X-Ray Eyes (1996)	King Kong Groover (1999)

Singles from The Boy with the X-Ray Eyes
- 1. "Spaceman" Released: 15 January 1996; 2. "Animal Army" Released: 15 April 1996; 3. "The Boy with the X-Ray Eyes" Released: 16 September 1996

Alternative cover
- US edition cover

The Boy with the X-Ray Eyes is the debut studio album by the English rock band Babylon Zoo, released in February 1996. It features the single "Spaceman", which charted at number one on the UK singles chart after being featured in a popular Levi's jeans TV advertisement in late 1995. The album peaked at number 6 on the UK Albums Chart and met with generally favourable reviews.

== Commercial performance ==
The Boy with the X-Ray Eyes peaked at number 6 in the UK Albums Chart on 17 February 1996, and lasted a total of six weeks in the top 100 (three in the top 40). Other than the chart-topping "Spaceman", singles released from the album were "Animal Army", which reached number 17 in the UK Singles Chart, and the title track, which peaked at number 32.
By the end of 1996, the album had sold around 750,000 copies worldwide, with its main markets in Europe (reaching the top 20 in several countries including Germany and Scandinavian territories), Japan and Australia. UK sales exceeded 100,000. In two months, the album had sold a "respectable" 12,000 copies in Canada.

== Critical reception ==
Professional ratings
Contemporaneous reviews (published in 1996)
Review scores
Source	Rating
The Age	5/10
Alternative Press	4/5
Dayton Daily News	3/4 stars
The Guardian	4/5 stars
Pensacola News Journal	3/4 stars
Q	4/5 stars
Select	2/5
Smash Hits	3/5
Times Colonist	3.5/5 stars
Vox	2/10

The Boy with the X-Ray Eyes was generally well-received by critics upon its release. In Babylon Zoo's native UK, Observer journalist Neil Spencer noted "a blast of Beatles and a hunk of early [David] Bowie", hailing bandleader Jas Mann as a "hero" and "1996's first real phenomenon". The Guardian named the album their "CD of the week". Rick Glanvill said: "This is a fey, pretentious vision of music but deny its energy and style to your detriment... Lyrics aren't a strong point but strong tunes put [Mann] on the harder side of glam." Q's Martin Aston asserted that "Spaceman" is "startlingly great", with the rest of the record being "equally appealing". David Sinclair in The Times referred to "a credible and cohesive collection of songs which harnesses a big, distorted guitar sound to a futuristic vision". Less enthused was music historian Martin C. Strong, who found the album to be "mediocre".

There were several negative reviews throughout the British Isles. The Daily Telegraph commended the first two tracks but lost interest thereafter, directing criticism at the "mannered" vocals, "increasingly precious" lyrics, and song arrangements in which "one grinding riff sure enough follows another". Andy Gill in The Independent described the album as "re-heated techno-glam guitar-rock somewhere between Ziggy Stardust and Jesus Jones", which brings home "just how mundane the notionally exotic can be". The Irish Times observed an "outmoded melange of distorted guitars, washed out synthesisers and pseudo sociological sci fi lyrics", listening to which is "not a pleasant experience". The List's Rodger Evans portrayed the record as "wholly uninspired", while Ian Harrison of Select dubbed it "a mime troupe unable to keep quiet".

The Boy with the X-Ray Eyes also garnered attention in the United States. People contended: "[T]he tunes basically reprise the sonic spirit and hooky appeal of ['Spaceman']. Before long you just might find yourself humming them in your sleep." Dave Thompson in Alternative Press felt "no fears for follow-ups" to the lead single, and likened the album to "[David] Bowie's Ziggy Stardust, remixed by the guys from Underworld". New York Times critic Neil Strauss described the record as "wonderful and satisfying in the short term but ultimately disposable". An unfavourable J. D. Considine in The Baltimore Sun chided the album's "shoddy sound and abundant gimmickry", concluding that "it's hard to imagine America falling for this junk".

== Legacy ==
Professional ratings
Retrospective reviews (published after 1996)
Review scores
Source	Rating
AllMusic	3/5 stars
The Virgin Encyclopedia of Nineties Music	2/5 stars

Kevin Courtney of The Irish Times found The Boy with the X-Ray Eyes to be "fatally flawed". British journalist Tim Moore criticised the length of its tracks as excessive, and called the album "persistently tuneless, repetitive and garbled". It was identified by BBC Radio presenter OJ Borg as the record he regrets buying. In 2017, Vice's Daisy Jones ranked 15 "one-hit wonder" albums from history, naming The Boy with the X-Ray Eyes as the worst. Jones had praise only for the chorus of "Spaceman", likening the remainder of the record to "being thumped on the head with a large chunk of wood then dragged backwards through thick sludge".

The Guardian and Q, who initially published favourable reviews, have named the record one of the worst of all time. In a 1999 Guardian article, critic Andrew Mueller labelled The Boy with the X-Ray Eyes "one of the most hilariously terrible albums ever made". Q staff ranked the LP at number 42 in their 2006 list of the 50 worst records in history, calling it an "album of lumpen MOR rock" that "sank without trace". A 2016 public poll organised by online trade-in site Ziffit.com placed it at number 31 in a list of the 50 worst records ever.

While acknowledging that readers might "sneer", NME published a defence of The Boy with the X-Ray Eyes by critic Gavin Haynes, who argued that the album, although "garish", "manages to pack as much melody and pop joy into its span as any of the canonical albums of [1996]." AllMusic awarded the record 3/5 stars, despite editor Stephen Thomas Erlewine's discrete review in which he observed a lack of cohesion and hooks, and characterised Mann as "pretentious, not ambitious".

== Track listing ==
All tracks written by Jas Mann.

1. "Animal Army" – 5:55
2. "Spaceman" – 5:41
3. "Zodiac Sign" – 4:58
4. "Paris Green" – 4:43
5. "Confused Art" – 4:32
6. "Caffeine" – 6:34
7. "The Boy with the X-Ray Eyes" – 4:27
8. "Don't Feed the Animals" – 1:38
9. "Fire Guided Light" – 6:43
10. "Is Your Soul for Sale?" – 5:52
11. "I'm Cracking Up I Need a Pill" – 3:46
- A CD promo sampler was also issued that includes the tracks "Spaceman", "Zodiac Sign", "Animal Army" and "I'm Cracking Up I Need a Pill".

== Charts ==
Chart (1996)	Peak Position
Australian Albums (ARIA)	28
Austrian Albums (Ö3 Austria)	23
Belgian Albums (Ultratop Flanders)	21
Belgian Albums (Ultratop Wallonia)	19
Canadian Albums (RPM)	65
Dutch Albums (Album Top 100)	21
Estonian Albums (Eesti Top 10)	2
European Albums Chart	20
Finnish Albums (Suomen virallinen lista)	4
French Albums (SNEP)	9
German Albums (Offizielle Top 100)	18
Hungarian Albums (MAHASZ)	31
Icelandic Albums (Tonlist)	11
Irish Albums (IRMA)	19
Italian Albums (Musica e dischi)	22
New Zealand Albums (RMNZ)	39
Norwegian Albums (VG-lista)	20
Swedish Albums (Sverigetopplistan)	19
Swiss Albums (Schweizer Hitparade)	8
UK Albums (OCC)	6

== Certifications ==
Region	Certification	Certified units/sales
United Kingdom (BPI)	Gold	100,000^{^}
^{^} Shipments figures based on certification alone.
