= Animal Army =

1996 single by Babylon Zoo

Single by Babylon Zoo

from the album The Boy With The X-Ray Eyes
- Released: 15 April 1996
- Genre: Gothic rock
- Length: 5:55 (album version); 3:58 (7-inch edit)
- Label: EMI
- Songwriter: Jas Mann
- Producers: Jas Mann; Steve Power

Babylon Zoo singles chronology
"Spaceman" (1996)	"Animal Army" (1996)	"The Boy with the X-Ray Eyes" (1996)

Professional ratings
Review scores
Source	Rating
Smash Hits	2/5 stars

"Animal Army" is a song by English rock band Babylon Zoo, released in April 1996 as the second single from their first album The Boy with the X-Ray Eyes and the follow-up to the band's UK chart-topping debut single "Spaceman". "Animal Army" was unable to duplicate the success of its predecessor, reaching number 17 on the UK Singles Chart and falling off the chart after a further week in the top 40. The song was more successful in continental Europe, entering the top 10 in Hungary and Latvia.

== Reception ==
The Daily Telegraph called the song a "surging, riff-heavy monster" that "could well give [Babylon Zoo] another number one". Select were critical, writing: "No amount of nudity, drugs or free stuff would help make this low-rent gothic mush any better." Sonic Youth's Lee Ranaldo, a guest reviewer in Select, said that the track "isn't nearly as good as ['Spaceman']."

== Track listings ==
UK CD single

1. "Animal Army" (7-inch edit) – 3:58
2. "Animal Army" (Arthur Plays with Animals) – 10:47
3. "Animal Army" (Babylon Bass mix) – 6:54
4. "Animal Army" (Arthur Dubs with Animals) – 10:58

UK 12-inch single

A1. "Animal Army" (Arthur Plays with Animals) – 10:47
B1. "Animal Army" (Kiss mix—remixed by Sunrise) – 7:04
B2. "Animal Army" (Capital mix—touched by the Zupervarians) – 3:47

UK cassette single

1. "Animal Army" (7-inch edit) – 3:58
2. "Animal Army" (Arthur Plays with Animals) – 10:47

European CD single

1. "Animal Army" (7-inch edit) – 3:58
2. "Animal Army" (Babylon Bass mix) – 6:54

Australian CD single

1. "Animal Army" (7-inch edit) – 4:01
2. "Animal Army" (Arthur Plays with Animals) – 10:49
3. "Animal Army" (Babylon Bass mix) – 6:55

== Charts ==
=== Weekly charts ===
Chart (1996)	Peak position
Australia (ARIA)	59
Croatia (HRT)	22
Europe (Eurochart Hot 100)	82
Hungary (Mahasz)	10
Latvia (Latvijas Top 40)	3
Scotland Singles (OCC)	23
UK Singles (OCC)	17
UK Rock & Metal (OCC)	1

=== Year-end charts ===
Chart (1996)	Position
Latvia (Latvijas Top 50)	43

== Release history ==
Region	Date	Format(s)	Label(s)	Ref.
United Kingdom	15 April 1996	CD; cassette	EMI United Kingdom	
United Kingdom	22 April 1996	12-inch vinyl	EMI United Kingdom	
