= All the Money's Gone =

Single by Babylon Zoo

from the album King Kong Groover
- B-side: Chrome Invader; All the Money's Gone (Wiseass Dawn Patrol Mix)
- Released: 25 January 1999
- Recorded: 1998
- Genre: Glam rock, alternative rock
- Label: EMI
- Songwriter(s): Jas Mann
- Producer(s): Jas Mann; Steve Power

Babylon Zoo singles chronology
"The Boy with the X-Ray Eyes" (1996)	"All the Money's Gone" (1999)	"Honaloochie Boogie" (1999)

"All the Money's Gone" is a song by Babylon Zoo and the first single to be taken from their second album King Kong Groover. It was written and produced by Jas Mann, and peaked at #46 on the UK Singles Chart in February 1999. An animated music video was made to accompany the single.

== Reception ==
The Sunday Mercury read: "Mann is having an identity crisis... he can't decide if he's [David] Bowie, Marc Bolan or Gary Glitter – but glam-rock, this disappointing record ain't". Ewan MacLeod of the Sunday Mail enjoyed the single's accompanying music video, but felt it "a shame the song sounds like a rip-off of Seventies glam group T-Rex". In NME, Steven Wells wrote that the "very Bowie-esque" track "sucks" on an unrivalled level. Anna Carey of the Sunday Tribune called it "hideous".

In a retrospective article for AllMusic, critic Dave Thompson likened the song to "an unholy collision between Oasis and Barry Blue's 'Dancing on a Saturday Night'."

== Track listing ==
- CD Promo Single 1998 EMI (CDEMDJ 519)
1. All the Money's Gone (7" Mix) - 3.44
- CD Single 1 1998 EMI (CDEMS 519)
1. All the Money's Gone - 3.44
2. Chrome Invader - 5.03
3. All the Money's Gone (Wiseass Dawn Patrol Remix) - 6.53
- CD Single 2 1998 EMI (CDEM 519)
1. All the Money's Gone - 3.44
2. All the Money's Gone (Tin Tin Out Vocal Mix) - 8.35
3. All the Money's Gone (Space Raiders Mix) - 6.08
