= Robson & Jerome (album) =

Studio album by Robson & Jerome
- Released: 19 November 1995
- Recorded: 1995
- Genre: Pop
- Label: RCA
- Producer: Mike Stock; Matt Aitken; Nigel Wright

Robson & Jerome chronology
Robson & Jerome (1995)	Take Two (1996)

Professional ratings
Review scores
Source	Rating
Smash Hits	5/5 stars

Robson & Jerome is the debut studio album by British singing duo Robson & Jerome. It was released in the UK in 1995 by RCA Records, and reached number one on the UK Albums Chart. It was the Christmas number one album of 1995, and was the biggest-selling album of the year, with sales of 2,040,000. For almost 20 years, it held the record for selling 2 million copies in the UK in the fastest time, doing so in 42 days; in 2015, Adele surpassed the record when her album 25 took just 29 days to reach the landmark.

In 2006, Q magazine included Robson & Jerome in their list of the 50 worst albums of all time.

== Background ==
In November 1994, in an episode of the British television drama series Soldier Soldier, Robson Green and Jerome Flynn performed "Unchained Melody" as an impromptu duo called "The Unrighteous Brothers", after the entertainment failed to appear at wedding. Their performance triggered a big response from the audience and ITV was inundated by people looking to buy the song. Simon Cowell was alerted to the interest shown by the public, and pursued the two reluctant actors (and later Robson's mother) for the next four months to record the song, to the extent that Robson Green threatened legal action to stop Cowell harassing them. The actors were eventually persuaded to sign a recording contract with Cowell and record a Righteous Brothers-type version of the song as a duo. Cowell enlisted music producers Mike Stock and Matt Aitken, with whom he had worked many times before, to produce the single.

== Success ==
Their cover of "Unchained Melody" was released as a double A-side single with "White Cliffs of Dover". It immediately reached No. 1 and stayed there for seven weeks, and became the best-selling song of 1995. It was also the best-selling song of the 1990s, until it was over-taken by "Candle in the Wind 1997", Elton John's tribute to Diana, Princess of Wales. It remains one of the country's best-selling singles. Their two follow-up singles, "I Believe" released later in the year, and "What Becomes of the Brokenhearted" released in 1996, also reached No. 1 on their release, and they became the first act in UK chart history to have their first three singles going straight in at number one. Their third single "What Becomes of the Brokenhearted"/"Saturday Night at the Movies"/"You'll Never Walk Alone" is also the only single released as a Triple A-side to go to number one.

Robson & Jerome was released in November 1995 and became the best-selling album of the year. The Beatles' Anthology 1, which it kept at number two, included one of the same songs, "This Boy".

== Track listing ==
1. "Unchained Melody" (Alex North, Hy Zaret)
2. "Daydream Believer" (John Stewart)
3. "I Believe" (Ervin Drake, Irvin Graham, Jimmy Shirl, Al Stillman)
4. "The Sun Ain't Gonna Shine Anymore" (Bob Crewe, Bob Gaudio)
5. "Up on the Roof" (Gerry Goffin, Carole King)
6. "I'll Come Running Back to You" (Sam Cooke)
7. "(There'll Be Bluebirds Over) The White Cliffs of Dover" (Walter Kent, Nat Burton)
8. "Amazing Grace" (John Newton, William Walker)
9. "If I Can Dream" (Walter Earl Brown)
10. "This Boy" (John Lennon, Paul McCartney)
11. "Love You Forever" (Paul Berrington)
12. "Little Latin Lupe Lu" (Bill Medley)
13. "Danny Boy" (Frederic Weatherly, Traditional)

== Charts and certifications ==
=== Weekly charts ===
Chart (1995)	Peak position
Australian Albums (ARIA)	74
Scottish Albums (OCC)	1
UK Albums (OCC)	1

=== Year-end charts ===
Chart (1995)	Position
UK Albums (OCC)	1
Chart (1996)	Position
UK Albums (OCC)	42

=== Decade-end charts ===
Chart (1990–99)	Position
UK Albums (OCC)	6

=== Certifications ===
Region	Certification	Certified units/sales
United Kingdom (BPI)	6× Platinum	2,336,086
Summaries
Europe (IFPI)	2× Platinum	2,000,000^{*}
^{*} Sales figures based on certification alone.
