= Babylon Zoo =

English rock band

- Origin: Wolverhampton, England
- Genres: Alternative rock; electronic rock
- Years active: 1992–2000
- Labels: Phonogram; WEA; EMI
- Past members: Jas Mann; Carrie Melbourne; Dave Goodes; Darrin Mooney; Paul Alcock; Robin Alcock; Chris Sheehan; Mark Bloomer

Babylon Zoo were an English rock band formed in 1992 in Wolverhampton. Their song "Spaceman" gained considerable exposure through its use in a Levi's jeans television advert in the United Kingdom in late 1995. Released as the band's debut single on 21 January 1996, it entered the UK singles chart at number one. "Spaceman" led to the band being perceived as a one-hit wonder, when subsequent releases charted less successfully.

== History ==
Frontman Jas Mann had formerly been in indie music band The Sandkings. In 1993, a three-track demo earned him a contract from Phonogram Records for his next project, Babylon Zoo, but ended up being signed to Warner's WEA record label, where the band recorded the album The Boy with the X-Ray Eyes. However, around this time Clive Black, managing director of Warner, was poached by rival record company EMI and so took Babylon Zoo over to EMI.

The band's first single was "Spaceman", which had been recorded and pressed by Warner as a CD single, before being scrapped when Black left the company. However, a promo version was played on a Manchester radio station. An advertising-agency creative heard it and decided it would be perfect for a Levi's jeans TV advert they were developing. Levi's used part of "Spaceman" for their UK TV ad and the hook of the song became popular. Even though the rest of the song turned into a slower grunge-glam style, it still became the fastest-selling debut single in British history at the time. The single sold 383,000 copies in the first week of release, spending 5 weeks at number 1.

Critic Steven Wells wrote the "Spaceman" single (resembling the Levi's advert version for only "about ten seconds") angered many consumers. He reported Mann drew further ire through self-aggrandising interviews, and noted his ridicule in the media, including by NME and in a 1997 episode of comedy TV series Brass Eye.

Tim Moore wrote "only failure and embarrassment" followed for Babylon Zoo. An album entitled The Boy with the X-Ray Eyes was produced at Mann's New Atlantis Productions music and video centre. It peaked at number 6 on the UK Albums Chart on 17 February, but quickly dropped out of the Top 40, lasting only a further two weeks on the chart. Subsequent singles charted progressively lower, failing to match the success of "Spaceman". The band's reputation was further damaged by a series of scathing live reviews.

In 1999, a follow-up album was released, King Kong Groover. The album received negative reviews and sold fewer than 10,000 units, failing to chart in the UK. The first single from the album was "All The Money's Gone", released in the UK and Europe and peaking at number 46 on the UK Singles Chart. The second single, a cover of Mott the Hoople's "Honaloochie Boogie", was only released as a promotional single in France. The group disbanded shortly after and Mann moved to India where he spent time working for an aid agency.

In 2005, Jas Mann announced he would be issuing a new Babylon Zoo album, called Cold Clockwork Doll. However, no official release date was ever announced and no further updates followed.

== Musical style and influences ==
Many journalists felt Babylon Zoo was influenced by David Bowie's musical style. As such, the band can be seen as a 1990s alternative rock band with glam and electronic influences.

== Discography ==
=== Albums ===
Title	Released	UK	AUS	Certification
The Boy with the X-Ray Eyes	February 1996	6	28	UK: Gold
King Kong Groover	February 1999	–	–	

=== Singles ===
Year	Song	UK	AUS	Certification	Album
1996	"Spaceman"	1	3	UK: Platinum; AUS: Gold	The Boy with the X-Ray Eyes
1996	"Animal Army"	17	59		The Boy with the X-Ray Eyes
1996	"The Boy with the X-Ray Eyes"	32	–		The Boy with the X-Ray Eyes
1999	"All the Money's Gone"	46	–		King Kong Groover
1999	"Honaloochie Boogie"	–	–		King Kong Groover
2000	"Love Lies Bleeding"	–	–		Non-album single

== See also ==
- List of people from Wolverhampton
