= List of best-selling singles by year in the United Kingdom =

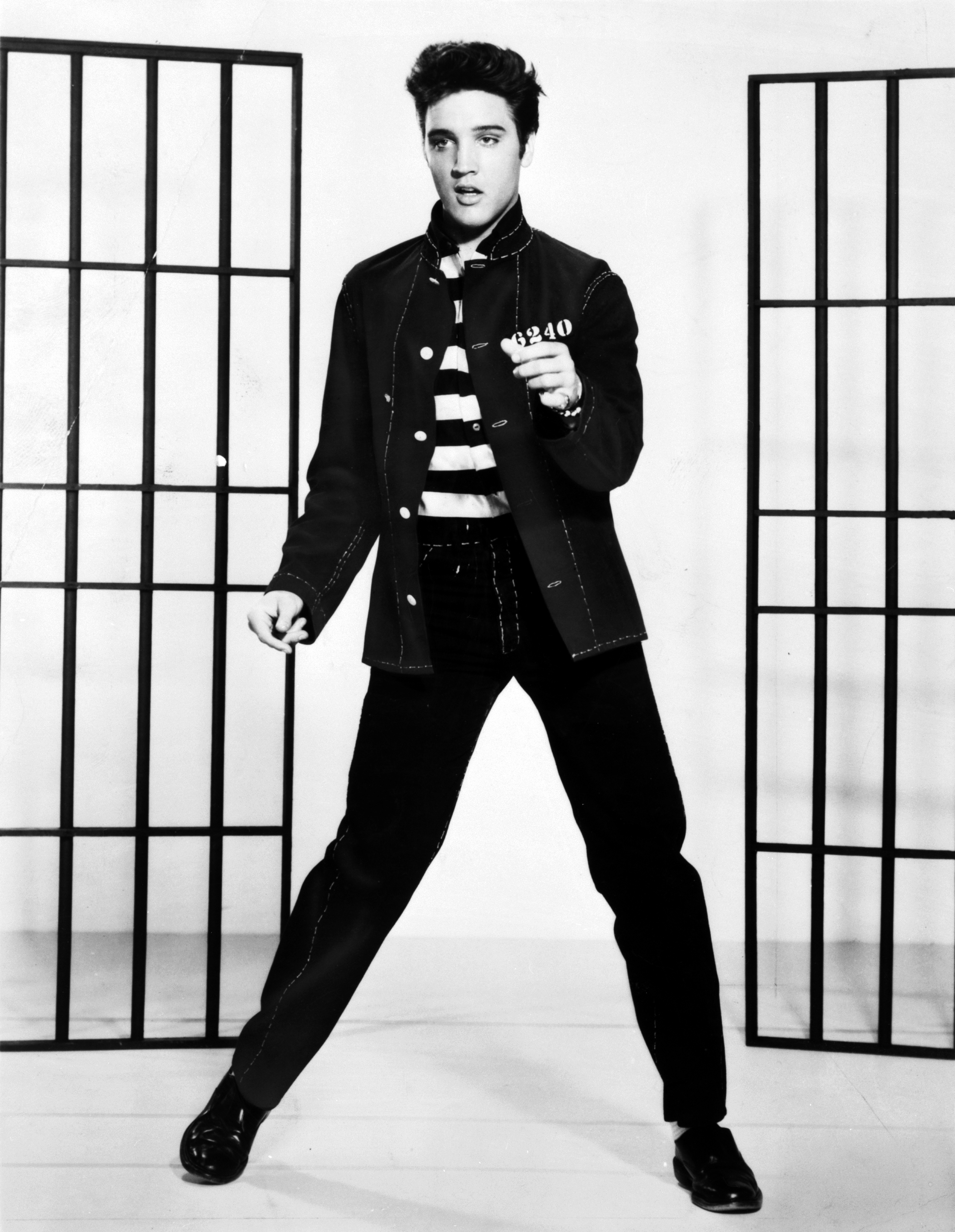
Elvis Presley performed the best-selling song in three years (1958, 1960, 1961)

This is a list of the best-selling singles on the UK singles chart for each year. The Number sold section denotes the number sold within the year, not in total, as very often the single continues to sell more in later years (and sometimes other singles released within a particular year will go on to outsell the year-end winner – e.g., Kylie Minogue and Jason Donovan's "Especially for You", from 1988, ultimately outsold "Mistletoe and Wine").

The best-selling UK single of all time is "Candle in the Wind 1997/Something About The Way You Look Tonight" by Elton John, which sold 4,770,000 copies.

== Best-selling singles by year ==
Year	Single	Artist	Number sold	Number sold and streamed
1952	"Here in My Heart"	Al Martino		N/A
1953	"I Believe"	Frankie Laine		N/A
1954	"Secret Love"	Doris Day		N/A
1955	"Rose Marie"	Slim Whitman		N/A
1956	"I'll Be Home"	Pat Boone		N/A
1957	"Diana"	Paul Anka		N/A
1958	"Jailhouse Rock"	Elvis Presley		N/A
1959	"Living Doll"	Cliff Richard	800,000	N/A
1960	"It's Now or Never"	Elvis Presley		N/A
1961	"Wooden Heart"	Elvis Presley		N/A
1962	"I Remember You"	Frank Ifield		N/A
1963	"She Loves You"	The Beatles	1,300,000	N/A
1964	"Can't Buy Me Love"	The Beatles		N/A
1965	"Tears"	Ken Dodd	1,268,000	N/A
1966	"Green, Green Grass of Home"	Tom Jones	850,000	N/A
1967	"Release Me"	Engelbert Humperdinck		N/A
1968	"Hey Jude"	The Beatles		N/A
1969	"Sugar, Sugar"	The Archies		N/A
1970	"In the Summertime"	Mungo Jerry		N/A
1971	"My Sweet Lord"	George Harrison	700,000	N/A
1972	"Amazing Grace"	The Royal Scots Dragoon Guards Band		N/A
1973	"Tie a Yellow Ribbon Round the Ole Oak Tree"	Dawn featuring Tony Orlando		N/A
1974	"Tiger Feet"	Mud	730,000	N/A
1975	"Bye Bye Baby"	Bay City Rollers		N/A
1976	"Save Your Kisses for Me"	Brotherhood of Man	1,006,000	N/A
1977	"Mull of Kintyre" / "Girls' School"	Wings	2,000,000	N/A
1978	"Rivers of Babylon" / "Brown Girl in the Ring"	Boney M.	1,995,000	N/A
1979	"Bright Eyes"	Art Garfunkel	1,155,000	N/A
1980	"Don't Stand So Close to Me"	The Police	808,000	N/A
1981	"Don't You Want Me"	The Human League	1,150,000	N/A
1982	"Come On Eileen"	Dexys Midnight Runners	1,200,000	N/A
1983	"Karma Chameleon"	Culture Club	1,390,000	N/A
1984	"Do They Know It's Christmas?"*	Band Aid	3,000,000	N/A
1985	"The Power of Love"	Jennifer Rush	1,280,000	N/A
1986	"Don't Leave Me This Way"	The Communards	745,000	N/A
1987	"Never Gonna Give You Up"	Rick Astley	759,000	N/A
1988	"Mistletoe and Wine"	Cliff Richard	750,000	N/A
1989	"Ride On Time"	Black Box	960,000	N/A
1990	"Unchained Melody"	The Righteous Brothers	840,000	N/A
1991	"(Everything I Do) I Do It for You"	Bryan Adams	1,850,000	
1992	"I Will Always Love You"	Whitney Houston	1,500,000	N/A
1993	"I'd Do Anything for Love (But I Won't Do That)"	Meat Loaf	720,000	N/A
1994	"Love Is All Around"	Wet Wet Wet	1,783,000	N/A
1995	"Unchained Melody"	Robson & Jerome	1,840,000	N/A
1996	"Killing Me Softly"	Fugees	1,360,000	N/A
1997	"Candle in the Wind 1997" / "Something About the Way You Look Tonight"*	Elton John	4,770,000	N/A
1998	"Believe"	Cher	1,830,000	N/A
1999	"...Baby One More Time"	Britney Spears	1,445,000	N/A
2000	"Can We Fix It?"	Bob the Builder	853,000	N/A
2001	"It Wasn't Me"	Shaggy featuring Rikrok	1,151,000	N/A
2002	"Anything Is Possible" / "Evergreen"	Will Young	1,783,919	N/A
2003	"Where Is the Love?"	The Black Eyed Peas	625,198	N/A
2004	"Do They Know It's Christmas?"*	Band Aid 20	1,065,000	N/A
2005	"Is This the Way to Amarillo"*	Tony Christie featuring Peter Kay	1,100,200	N/A
2006	"Crazy"	Gnarls Barkley	820,053	N/A
2007	"Bleeding Love"	Leona Lewis	788,000	N/A
2008	"Hallelujah"	Alexandra Burke	888,000	N/A
2009	"Poker Face"	Lady Gaga	882,059	N/A
2010	"Love the Way You Lie"	Eminem featuring Rihanna		N/A
2011	"Someone like You"	Adele	1,996,000	N/A
2012	"Somebody That I Used to Know"	Gotye featuring Kimbra	1,318,000	N/A
2013	"Blurred Lines"	Robin Thicke featuring T.I. and Pharrell Williams	1,470,000	N/A
2014	"Happy"	Pharrell Williams	1,500,000	1,620,000
2015	"Uptown Funk"	Mark Ronson featuring Bruno Mars		1,760,000
2016	"One Dance"	Drake featuring Wizkid & Kyla	530,000	1,950,000
2017	"Shape of You"	Ed Sheeran	787,000	3,200,000
2018	"One Kiss"	Calvin Harris and Dua Lipa	244,000	1,570,000
2019	"Someone You Loved"	Lewis Capaldi		2,300,000
2020	"Blinding Lights"	The Weeknd		2,200,000
2021	"Bad Habits"	Ed Sheeran	142,000	1,700,000
2022	"As It Was"	Harry Styles	65,000	1,550,000
2023	"Flowers"	Miley Cyrus	91,000	1,700,000
2024	"Stick Season"	Noah Kahan		1,990,000
2025	"Ordinary"	Alex Warren		2,200,000

== Best-selling singles by decade ==
Decade	Single	Artist	Number sold
1950s	"Rock Around the Clock"	Bill Haley & His Comets	
1960s	"She Loves You"	The Beatles	
1970s	"Mull of Kintyre" / "Girls' School"	Paul McCartney and Wings	
1980s	"Do They Know It's Christmas?"	Band Aid	
1990s	"Something About the Way You Look Tonight" / "Candle in the Wind 1997"	Elton John	
2000s	"Anything Is Possible" / "Evergreen"	Will Young	
2010s	"Shape of You"	Ed Sheeran (Note: Based on combined sales, i.e. including streaming.)	

== See also ==
- List of best-selling albums by year in the United Kingdom
