= Take Two (Robson & Jerome album) =

Studio album by Robson & Jerome
- Released: 1996
- Recorded: 1996
- Genre: Pop, easy listening, middle of the road
- Label: RCA
- Producer: Mike Stock, Matt Aitken and Nigel Wright

Robson & Jerome chronology
Robson & Jerome (1995)	Take Two (1996)

Take Two is the second album by English singing duo Robson & Jerome. It was released in 1996 by RCA Records and peaked at number one on the UK Albums Chart. It was the Christmas number two album that year.

== Track listing ==
1. "What Becomes of the Brokenhearted" (William Weatherspoon, Paul Riser, James Dean)
2. "True Love Ways" (Buddy Holly, Norman Petty)
3. "Something's Gotten Hold of My Heart" (Roger Greenaway, Roger Cook)
4. "Elenore" (Howard Kaylan, Mark Volman, Al Nichol, Jim Pons, John Barbata)
5. "Saturday Night at the Movies" (Cynthia Weil, Barry Mann)
6. "Bring It On Home to Me" (Sam Cooke)
7. "You'll Never Walk Alone" (Richard Rodgers, Oscar Hammerstein II)
8. "Oh, Pretty Woman" (Roy Orbison, Bill Dees)
9. "Keep the Customer Satisfied" (Paul Simon)
10. "The Price of Love" (Don Everly, Phil Everly)
11. "Silent Night" (Franz Xaver Gruber, Joseph Mohr)
12. "What Becomes of the Brokenhearted (Gospel Version)" (Weatherspoon, Riser, Dean)
13. "Ain't Misbehavin'" (Thomas "Fats" Waller, Harry Brooks, Andy Razaf)
14. "A Nightingale Sang in Berkeley Square" (Eric Maschwitz, Manning Sherwin)
15. "The Kiss Polka" (Mack Gordon, Harry Warren)

== Charts ==
=== Weekly charts ===
Chart (1996)	Peak position
New Zealand Albums (RMNZ)	14
Scottish Albums (OCC)	1
UK Albums (OCC)	1

=== Year-end charts ===
Chart (1996)	Position
UK Albums (OCC)	6
