= The Boy with the X-Ray Eyes (song) =

Single by Babylon Zoo

from the album The Boy With The X-Ray Eyes
- B-side: Merv's Tune; Spaceman - Zupervarian Mix
- Released: 16 September 1996
- Recorded: 1995
- Label: EMI
- Songwriter: Jas Mann
- Producers: Jas Mann; Steve Power

Babylon Zoo singles chronology
"Animal Army" (1996)	"The Boy with the X-Ray Eyes" (1996)	"All the Money's Gone" (1999)

"The Boy with the X-Ray Eyes" is a song by Babylon Zoo, released in September 1996 as the third and final single from their debut album of the same name. The release was a failure, continuing a downward trend in chart positions for the group's singles and peaking at #32 on the UK Singles Chart. It marked Babylon Zoo's final appearance in the UK Top 40.

The single version was a new edit of the song, remixed by Arthur Baker. Each CD version (including the two promos) has a different colour sleeve and disc.

== Reception ==
Select critic Ian Harrison wrote that the song "mixes showtune sensibilities with generic Beatles theft".

== Track listing ==
CD Promo Single 1996 EMI (CDEMDJ 440)

1. The Boy with the X-Ray Eyes (7" Mix)

CD Promo Single 1996 EMI (CDEMDJX 440)

1. The Boy with the X-Ray Eyes (7" Mix)
2. The Boy with the X-Ray Eyes (Armageddon Babylon Mix)
3. The Boy with the X-Ray Eyes (Orchestral Mix)
4. The Boy with the X-Ray Eyes (X-Rated Mix)
5. Mervs Tune

CD Single 1 1996 EMI (CDEM 440)

1. The Boy with the X-Ray Eyes (7" Mix)
2. Mervs Tune
3. Spaceman (Zupervarian Mix)

CD Single 2 1996 EMI (CDEMS 440)

1. The Boy with the X-Ray Eyes (7" Mix)
2. The Boy with the X-Ray Eyes (Armageddon Babylon Mix)
3. The Boy with the X-Ray Eyes (X-Rated Mix)
4. The Boy with the X-Ray Eyes (Orchestral Mix)

== Charts ==
Chart (1996)	Peak position
Latvia (Latvijas Top 40)	10
Scotland Singles (Official Charts)	50
UK Singles (Official Charts)	32
