= Jas Mann =

British musician (born 1971)

- Born: Jasbinder Singh Mann; 24 April 1971 (age 55); Dudley, Staffordshire, England
- Genre: Alternative rock
- Occupations: Musician; singer-songwriter; record producer; film producer
- Instruments: Vocals; guitar; bass guitar; piano
- Years active: 1986–present
- Labels: New Atlantis; EMI
- Website: www.jasmann.org

Jasbinder Singh "Jas" Mann (Punjabi: ਜਸਵਿੰਦਰ ਸਿੰਘ ਮੱਨ, born 24 April 1971) is a British songwriter, musician, singer, record producer and film producer. He was lead singer of Babylon Zoo, known for their 1996 UK chart-topping single "Spaceman" and No. 6 album The Boy with the X-Ray Eyes.

== Early life ==
Mann was born in Dudley, West Midlands, England, to a Punjabi Indian father and a mother of Apache descent. Mann formed his first band at the age of 15, with his friend Adam Toussaint; they were called The Glove Puppets. Mann personally funded a 7" vinyl single, sold through local record shops in 1987.

The Sandkings, another Wolverhampton band, enlisted Mann as their vocalist in 1988. The group, named after a 1981 collection of sci-fi short stories by George R. R. Martin, released seven singles and an EP with Mann between 1988 and 1992 as well as an album. They scored three Top 10 hits in the UK indie single chart.

The Sandkings were the opening act for Happy Mondays and The Stone Roses in the early 1990s, but Mann left the band because of creative differences.

== Babylon Zoo ==
The single "Spaceman" charted at No. 1 in the UK Singles Chart, in January 1996 after appearing on a Levi's commercial, selling 420,000 copies in its first week. It became the fastest selling single in the United Kingdom in over thirty years, since The Beatles' "Can't Buy Me Love". "Spaceman" became a number one chart hit in 23 countries, including the United Kingdom. As of November 2012, "Spaceman" was the 74th best selling single in the history of the United Kingdom, selling 1.14 million copies. Critic Jon Savage wrote, "Staring into the cameras, as sexy/strange as Mick Jagger in 1965, Mann cast the nation under his spell."

An album entitled The Boy with the X-Ray Eyes was produced at Mann's New Atlantis Productions music/artwork/video centre. It was released in 1996 and peaked at No. 6 in the UK Albums Chart The following two singles charted in the UK top 40: "Animal Army" (No. 17) and "The Boy with the X-Ray Eyes" (No. 32). Three years later, in 1999, a follow-up album was released entitled King Kong Groover. Neither the album nor its single, "All the Money's Gone", were top 40 entries.

== After "Spaceman" ==
In 2004, Mann staged a competition in which he asked fans to sum up their lives in one word, which he would then write into the song lyrics of his new album. In 2005, he announced he would be issuing the new Babylon Zoo album, Cold Clockwork Doll, although this has yet to be released.

In 2008, Mann co-founded the Indomina Group, an independent studio based in Los Angeles and the Dominican Republic. In 2011, in partnership with Pinewood Group, Indomina Group created Pinewood Indomina Studios in the Dominican Republic. Mann sold his ownership to the Vicini Group after an investment from the IFC. Indomina distributed the 2012 films The Imposter (2012) and A Fantastic Fear of Everything. In 2013, Indomina shut its US office to relocate full operations to the Dominican Republic.

Mann is also a board member of the children's charity International Child Art Foundation, providing arts programming in schools.

In 2013, Mann co-founded Virgin Produced India, a film production company in partnership with the Virgin Group.
