= Saturday Night at the Movies (song) =

Single by the Drifters

from the album The Good Life with the Drifters
- B-side: "Spanish Lace"
- Released: 1964
- Recorded: 1964
- Studio: Atlantic (New York City)
- Genre: Soul, doo-wop
- Length: 2:26
- Label: Atlantic
- Songwriters: Barry Mann, Cynthia Weil
- Producer: Bert Berns

The Drifters singles chronology
"I've Got Sand in My Shoes" (1964)	"Saturday Night at the Movies" (1964)	""The Christmas Song" / "I Remember Christmas"" (1964)

Official audio
- "Saturday Night at the Movies" on YouTube

"Saturday Night at the Movies" is a song written by Barry Mann and Cynthia Weil and performed by American vocal group the Drifters with Johnny Moore as vocalist. The song was arranged and conducted by Teacho Wiltshire and produced by Bert Berns.

The song was released as a 1964 single, peaking at number 18 on the US Billboard Hot 100. In the United Kingdom, the song peaked at number 35. The song charted again in the UK in March 1972 when reissued as a double A-side with "At the Club", peaking at number three on the UK Singles Chart.

== Personnel ==
The song was recorded on August 4, 1964, at Atlantic Studios in New York City.

- Johnny Moore – lead tenor vocal
- Charlie Thomas – tenor vocal
- Eugene Pearson – baritone vocal
- Johnny Terry – bass vocal
- Ernie Hayes – piano
- Everett Barksdale – guitar
- Bill Suyker – guitar
- Bob Bushnell – guitar
- Milt Hinton – bass
- Gary Chester – drums

== Charts ==
Chart (1964–1965)	Peak position
UK Singles (OCC)	35
US Billboard Hot 100	18
US Top 50 in R&B Locations (Cash Box)	8

Chart (1972)	Peak position
UK Singles (OCC)	3

== Certifications ==
Region	Certification	Certified units/sales
New Zealand (RMNZ)	Platinum	30,000^{‡}
United Kingdom (BPI)	Silver	200,000^{‡}
^{‡} Sales+streaming figures based on certification alone.

== Other versions ==
- Inger Öst recorded the song with lyrics in Swedish by Green as På nian på lördag, releasing it as a single in January 1968, with Öppna ditt hjärta (Open Your Heart) acting as a B-side.
- In 1996, a version was featured as track 5 on the album Take Two, the second and final studio album by English pop-duo Robson and Jerome. It also features on both of the duo's compilation albums, titled "Happy Days – The Best Of" and "The Love Songs".
- In 2002, the song was recorded by Swedish band Barbados on the album Världen utanför.
- In 2008, Swedish band Drifters recorded the song on the album Tycker om dig: Svängiga låtar från förr.
- In 2017, English singer Joe McElderry recorded the song on his #10 album, also titled Saturday Night at the Movies.
