= Spaceman (Babylon Zoo song) =

1996 single by Babylon Zoo

Single by Babylon Zoo

from the album The Boy with the X-Ray Eyes
- B-side: "Spaceman (The 5th Dimension)"; "Metal Vision"; "Blue Nude"
- Released: 15 January 1996
- Length: 5:41 (album version); 4:08 (radio edit)
- Label: EMI
- Songwriter: Jas Mann
- Producers: Jas Mann; Steve Power

Babylon Zoo singles chronology
"Spaceman" (1996)	"Animal Army" (1996)

"Spaceman" is a song by the English rock band Babylon Zoo, released on 15 January 1996 by EMI Records as the lead single from their debut album, The Boy with the X-Ray Eyes (1996). It was written by lead singer Jas Mann and co-produced by him with Steve Power. Featuring heavily distorted guitars and metallic, robotic sounding vocals, the song entered the UK singles chart at number one on 21 January 1996 following its use in a Levi's jeans television advertisement the previous year; "Spaceman" was the sixth song to reach number one in the UK after being featured in a Levi's advert. It was a worldwide hit as well, reaching number one in 10 other countries and entering the top 10 in an additional 11. Mark Neale directed the accompanying music video.

== Song history ==
Promotional copies of "Spaceman" had been distributed, and the Arthur Baker remix was chosen to tie in with the release of a new Levi's advertisement titled "Planet" in 1995, which was directed by Vaughan Arnell and Anthea Benton and aired in the UK. The advertisement concentrated on Baker's sped-up vocal section at the beginning and end of the song, featuring an alien neighbourhood inspired by the 1950s with alien parents awaiting the return of their teen daughter. There is a full EDM version with sped up vocals called "Spaceman (Zupervarian Mix)". Russian model Kristina Semenovskaya played the daughter, wearing Levi's jeans.

The initial intro to "Spaceman" on the promotional copies, before it was used for the advert, featured Jas Mann's whispering vocals of "I killed your mother, I killed your sister, I killed you all." These lyrics were later taken out of the song and replaced with the more radio friendly Arthur Baker introduction.

In 2006, "Spaceman" featured on trailers for Ant and Dec's film Alien Autopsy, the BBC's children's channel, CBeebies for the animated preschool series Lunar Jim, and Network Ten's advertisement for Battlestar Galactica. "Spaceman" is also used in Eesti otsib superstaari (Pop Idol Estonia). "Spaceman" is also featured in E4's My Mad Fat Diary, in the episode "Ladies and Gentlemen", during the scene where Rae and Finn begin their drive to Knebworth.

== Reception and legacy ==
Contemporary reception was generally favourable. The NME's Roger Morton made it Single of the Week; Chuck Eddy at Entertainment Weekly described the song's "futuristic kitsch" as "both funny and seductive." Music & Media said it's "basically a good pop tune whose hooks grab you by the throat." Music Week gave it a score of four out of five, adding that "the energetic and distinctive guitar rock of Spaceman is featured on the new Levis ad, so expect big sales." Reviewing The Boy with the X-Ray Eyes in Select, Ian Harrison described the song as a "bin-lid dancey metal effort with a weakness for vintage Bowie-isms (done like Bauhaus with synths) and a suspected humour deficiency". Also Helen Lamont of Smash Hits rated the song four out of five. She noted: "The intro sounds just like the ad – all high pitched and squeaky – but then everything takes a turn for the serious. Fear not, though – it is still good – but in a charming slit-your-wrists, top-of-the-rock charts kind of way." David Sinclair of The Times wrote: "A heavily synthesised rocker, with an oddly lurching, varispeed intro, Spaceman is rich in futuristic imagery, with echoes of David Bowie and Gary Numan that extend well beyond its title... With its bright, icy appeal and a moody undercurrent, it sounds as if it should wear well. Like the jeans."

Many felt misled by the intro compared to the rest of the song , claiming it was a bait and switch. Retrospectively, Noisey UK managing editor Daisy Jones found the song's verses to be lacklustre but the chorus reminiscent of "the sudden sickly swell of euphoria 20 minutes after popping a surprisingly pure pill". Stephen Thomas Erlewine of AllMusic called the track a "bizarre, tuneless collage of hip-hop rhythms, techno keyboards and alternative guitars", that despite sounding distinctive, lacks "any tangible hook to make it memorable". Writer Tim Moore and a Scotsman journalist likened the song to a dirge, and unfavourably compared it to the Arthur Baker (Zupervarian) remix; Moore attributed the single's success to the Baker (Zupervarian) remix and its Levi's advert exposure. Steven Wells of NME recalled: "Millions of pop kids rushed down Woolies and bought the single – only to get it home to discover to their horror that it was 'good' (like in the advert) for about ten seconds, and then became rubbish. Very rubbish." Colleague Sarah Anderson wrote: "There can be few more crushing letdowns in pop than the full single mix of 'Spaceman'." Singer Katie Melua, who has performed the song live occasionally, has called it "ridiculously catchy" with "bloody weird" lyrics. The Danish singer, MØ employed the chorus in her song Spaceman, which was published on YouTube on 12 August 2022. She said on its launch: "I wrote my version of the song with Noonie Bao, Ilsey Juber, and Oscar Holter, building on the original version written by Jas Mann. It was Oscar Holter who had the brilliant idea to use the hook from Babylon Zoo’s cult classic Spaceman as the chorus, and we all loved that idea! ". Commenting on the music video, MØ said she gets to "live out my Ripley from Alien fantasy and then I get turned into this alien."

MTV UK ranked "Spaceman" as the number-24 single of the 1990s. "Spaceman" was voted number 31 in a 2006 Channel 4 poll of the 50 best songs by one-hit wonders.

Numerous bands and artists have covered the song in various styles through recent years, including MØ, Ze Gran Zeft and The Parasitic Twins.

== Commercial performance ==
The single charted at number one on the UK Singles Chart, registering first-week sales of 383,000. It became the fastest-selling debut single in British pop music history, and the best-selling single in the United Kingdom in over thirty years, since the Beatles' "Can't Buy Me Love". "Spaceman" became a number one chart hit in 23 countries. As of June 2013, "Spaceman" was the 79th best-selling single in the history of the United Kingdom, selling 1.15 million copies.

== Music video ==
Following the release of the single a music video was produced, directed by British director Mark Neale. It features a black-and-white prologue with Jas Mann as a night driver who has a close encounter with aliens appearing from fog on the road, with the vocals sped up. When the vocals decelerate and return to normal pitch, the video alternates between the band playing in an underground place full of young people dancing with the band playing alone in a blue-colored desert landscape, with Mann singing to camera. Finally the vocals are sped up again, during a black-and-white epilogue that returns to the prologue's scene, where aliens go missing in the fog but one of them turns in front of the camera pointing to the night sky, showing that he's the night driver, turned into another alien.

== Track listings ==
- UK CD1
1. "Spaceman" – 4:41
2. "Metal Vision" – 3:48
3. "Blue Nude" – 2:09
4. "Spaceman" (album version) – 5:42
- UK CD2
1. "Spaceman" (album version) – 5:42
2. "Spaceman" (Electronic Information) – 7:43
3. "Spaceman" (Arthur Meets the Spaceman) – 5:56
4. "Spaceman" (E Before I) – 6:37
5. "Spaceman" (Morbid Television Control) – 4:40
- UK 12-inch single

A1. "Spaceman" (radio edit) – 4:08
A2. "Spaceman (The 5th Dimension)" – 5:09
B1. "Spaceman" (Arthur Meets the Spaceman) – 5:56
B2. "Spaceman" (E Before I) – 6:37

- UK cassette single

A1. "Spaceman" (radio edit) – 4:08
A2. "Blue Nude" – 2:09
B1. "Metal Vision" – 3:48
B2. "Spaceman (The 5th Dimension)" – 5:09

- US and Australian CD single
1. "Spaceman" (radio edit) – 4:08
2. "Metal Vision" – 3:48
3. "Blue Nude" – 2:09
4. "Spaceman (The 5th Dimension)" – 5:09
- US cassette single
1. "Spaceman" (radio edit) – 4:08
2. "Blue Nude" – 2:09

== Charts ==
=== Weekly charts ===
Chart (1996)	Peak position
Australia (ARIA)	3
Austria (Ö3 Austria Top 40)	1
Belgium (Ultratop 50 Flanders)	1
Belgium (Ultratop 50 Wallonia)	1
Canada Retail Singles (The Record)	17
Canada Rock/Alternative (RPM)	23
Croatia (HRT)	2
Czech Republic (IFPI CR)	5
Denmark (IFPI)	1
Estonia (Eesti Top 20)	3
Europe (Eurochart Hot 100)	1
Europe (European Alternative Rock Radio)	2
Europe (European Hit Radio)	4
Finland (Suomen virallinen lista)	1
Finland Airplay (Radiosoittolista)	1
France (SNEP)	1
France Airplay (SNEP)	1
Germany (GfK)	1
Iceland (Íslenski Listinn Topp 40)	2
Ireland (IRMA)	1
Israel (Israeli Singles Chart)	3
Italy (Musica e dischi)	3
Latvia (Latvijas Top 40)	11
Netherlands (Dutch Top 40)	4
Netherlands (Single Top 100)	3
New Zealand (Recorded Music NZ)	4
Norway (VG-lista)	1
Poland Airplay (Music & Media)	1
Scottish Singles Sales (Official Charts)	1
Spain (AFYVE)	4
Spain Airplay (Top 40 Radio)	1
Sweden (Sverigetopplistan)	1
Switzerland (Schweizer Hitparade)	2
UK Singles (Official Charts)	1
UK Airplay (Music Week)	15
UK Pop Tip Club Chart (Music Week)	1

=== Year-end charts ===
Chart (1996)	Position
Australia (ARIA)	30
Austria (Ö3 Austria Top 40)	13
Belgium (Ultratop 50 Flanders)	5
Belgium (Ultratop 50 Wallonia)	13
Europe (Eurochart Hot 100)	5
France (SNEP)	19
France Airplay (SNEP)	29
Germany (Media Control)	19
Iceland (Íslenski Listinn Topp 40)	37
Latvia (Latvijas Top 50)	47
Netherlands (Dutch Top 40)	65
Netherlands (Single Top 100)	73
New Zealand (RIANZ)	27
Norway (VG-lista)	5
Sweden (Topplistan)	3
Switzerland (Schweizer Hitparade)	25
UK Singles (OCC)	3

== Certifications ==
Region	Certification	Certified units/sales
Australia (ARIA)	Gold	35,000^{^}
Austria (IFPI Austria)	Gold	25,000^{*}
Belgium (BRMA)	Gold	25,000^{*}
France (SNEP)	Gold	250,000^{*}
Germany (BVMI)	Gold	250,000^{^}
New Zealand (RMNZ)	Platinum	10,000^{*}
Sweden (GLF)	Gold	25,000^{^}
United Kingdom (BPI)	Platinum	1,150,000
^{*} Sales figures based on certification alone.^{^} Shipments figures based on certification alone.

== Release history ==
Region	Date	Format(s)	Label(s)	Ref.
United Kingdom	15 January 1996	12-inch vinyl; CD; cassette	EMI	
United States	30 April 1996	Contemporary hit radio	EMI	

== Notable cover versions ==
- Katie Melua has performed an acoustic version of this song live.
- The Kovenant has covered the song on their album Animatronic.
- Rosetta Stone included their cover as one of six hidden tracks on their Chemical Emissions reworkings album
