= Robson & Jerome =

English pop duo

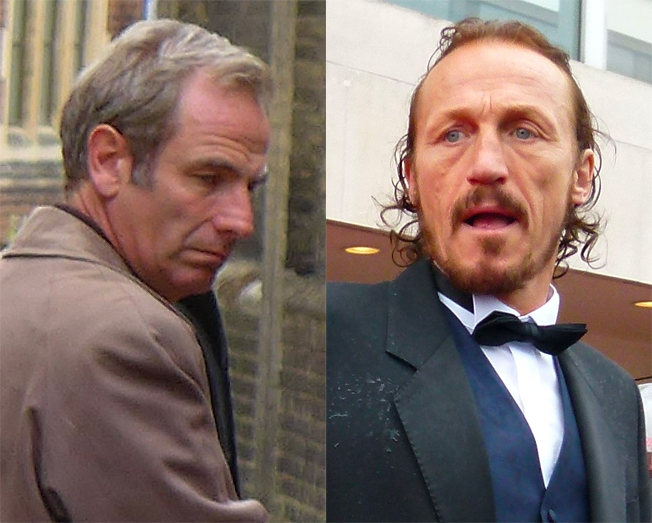
- Robson Green (left, pictured in 2015) and Jerome Flynn (right, pictured in 2013)

Background information
- Origin: England
- Genres: Pop
- Years active: 1995–1997
- Labels: RCA; BMG
- Past members: Robson Green; Jerome Flynn

Robson & Jerome were an English pop duo active in the mid-1990s, consisting of actors Robson Green and Jerome Flynn. They rose to prominence via the British television series Soldier Soldier.

The duo's musical catalogue was composed entirely of covers. Their version of "Unchained Melody" stayed at number 1 for 7 weeks on the UK Chart, selling more than 1.8 million copies and becoming the best-selling single of 1995. They had two further number-one singles, produced by Mike Stock and Matt Aitken – "I Believe" (1995) and "What Becomes of the Brokenhearted" (1996) – and two number-one studio albums. A pair of compilation albums followed.

== Music career ==
In a November 1994 episode of the UK television drama series Soldier Soldier, Dave Tucker and Paddy Garvey, played by Robson Green and Jerome Flynn respectively, performed "Unchained Melody" as an impromptu duo "The Unrighteous Brothers" after the entertainment failed to appear at a wedding. Their performance triggered a big response from the audience and ITV was inundated by people looking to buy the song. Simon Cowell was alerted to the interest shown by the public, and pursued the two reluctant actors (and later Robson's mother) for the next four months to record the song, to the extent that Robson Green threatened legal action to stop Cowell harassing them. The actors were eventually persuaded to sign a recording contract with Cowell and record a Righteous Brothers-type version of the song as a duo. Cowell enlisted music producers Mike Stock and Matt Aitken, with whom he had worked many times before, to produce the single.

Their cover of "Unchained Melody" was released as a double A-side single with White Cliffs of Dover. It immediately reached No. 1 and stayed there for seven weeks, and became the best-selling song of 1995 in the UK. It was also the best-selling song of the 1990s, until it was over-taken by "Candle in the Wind 1997", Elton John's tribute to Diana, Princess of Wales. It remains one of the country's best-selling singles. Their two follow-up singles, "I Believe" released later in the year, and "What Becomes of the Brokenhearted" released in 1996, also reached No. 1 on their release, and they became the first act in UK chart history to have their first three singles going straight in at number one.

Their first album, the self-titled Robson & Jerome, was released in November 1995 and became the best-selling album of the year, and the second album from 1996, Take Two, was equally successful. Robson & Jerome eventually sold 7 million albums and 5 million singles. They decided to quit despite being offered £3 million for a third album by Cowell.

== Popularity and criticisms ==
Robson & Jerome were popular but music critics argued that they lacked artistic merit. Stephen Thomas Erlewine in AllMusic wrote that they "offered nothing new musically", and said that: "such grand success made them the target of derision for much of the music press, who criticized the duo's manufactured, polished covers of pop and rock classics as nostalgia mongering...Robson & Jerome became the target of a number of attacks."

The duo also attracted criticism after it emerged that they did not sing parts of their recordings, which were patched with uncredited vocalists to achieve higher and steadier notes than they could achieve. Session singer Des Dyer (formerly of the band Jigsaw) made the allegation that his was the voice on the record, and contacted RCA and a newspaper. Although Stock obtained a court injunction to stop Dyer from making the allegation, the head of BMG John Preston decided to pay Dyer £75,000 at Simon Cowell's behest, money that was then deducted from Stock's royalties. In 2008, Stock admitted that the vocals were "assisted" by session singers, explaining: 'Des Dyer was brought in to assist with the Jerome part – because his voice and Jerome's were similar...The Robson part was done by a totally different singer and the high note was a totally different guy.' Stock added that both Robson and Jerome did contribute vocals: "they are singing on the record without a shadow of a doubt".

== Discography ==
=== Studio albums ===
List of studio albums, with selected details, chart positions and certifications
Title	Album details	Peak chart positions				Certifications
Title	Album details	UK	AUS	NZ	SCO	Certifications
Robson & Jerome	Released: November 1995; Label: RCA	1	74	—	1	UK: 6× Platinum
Take Two	Released: November 1996; Label: RCA	1	—	14	1	UK: 4× Platinum
"—" denotes items that did not chart or were not released in that territory.

=== Compilation albums ===
Title	Album details	Peak chart positions		Certifications
Title	Album details	UK	SCO	Certifications
Happy Days: The Best of Robson & Jerome	Released: November 1997; Label: RCA	20	50	UK: Gold
Love Songs	Released: April 2000; Label: BMG	—	—	
"—" denotes items that did not chart or were not released in that territory.

=== Singles ===
Year	Title	Peak chart positions				Certifications	Album
Year	Title	UK	IRE	NLD	SCO	Certifications	Album
1995	"Unchained Melody" / "(There'll Be Bluebirds Over) The White Cliffs of Dover"	1	2	—	1	UK: 2× Platinum	Robson & Jerome
1995	"I Believe" / "Up on the Roof"	1	3	45	1	UK: Platinum	Robson & Jerome
1996	"What Becomes of the Brokenhearted" / "Saturday Night at the Movies" / "You'll Never Walk Alone"	1	7	—	1	UK: Platinum	Take Two
"—" denotes items that did not chart or were not released in that territory.

== See also ==
- List of UK Singles Chart number ones of the 1990s
