= List of UK top-ten albums in 1991 =

The UK Albums Chart is one of many music charts compiled by the Official Charts Company that calculates the best-selling albums of the week in the United Kingdom. Before 2004, the chart was only based on the sales of physical albums. This list shows albums that peaked in the Top 10 of the UK Albums Chart during 1991, as well as albums which peaked in 1990 and 1992 but were in the top 10 in 1991. The entry date is when the album appeared in the top ten for the first time (week ending, as published by the Official Charts Company, which is six days after the chart is announced).

The first new number-one album of the year was MCMXC a.D. by Enigma. Overall, twenty-four different albums peaked at number-one in 1991, with Queen (2) having the most albums hit that position.

== Top-ten albums ==
Key

Symbol	Meaning
‡	Album peaked in 1990 but still in chart in 1991.
♦	Album released in 1991 but peaked in 1992.
Entered	The date that the album first appeared in the chart.
Peak	Highest position that the album reached in the UK Albums Chart.

Entered (week ending)	Weeks in top 10	Single	Artist	Peak	Peak reached (week ending)	Weeks at peak
Albums in 1990
17 March 1990	23	Soul Provider ‡	Michael Bolton	4	8 September 1990	1
4 August 1990	4	Please Hammer, Don't Hurt 'Em ‡	MC Hammer	8	11 August 1990	2
1 September 1990	22	Carreras Domingo Pavarotti in Concert ‡	José Carreras, Placido Domingo and Luciano Pavarotti	1	8 September 1990	5
15 September 1990	19	Listen Without Prejudice Vol. 1 ‡	George Michael	1	15 September 1990	1
10 November 1990	20	The Very Best of Elton John ‡	Elton John	1	10 November 1990	2
17 November 1990	12	Serious Hits... Live! ‡	Phil Collins	2	17 November 1990	1
17 November 1990	10	I'm Your Baby Tonight	Whitney Houston	4	19 January 1991	1
17 November 1990	8	From a Distance: The Event ‡	Cliff Richard	3	29 December 1990	1
24 November 1990	27	The Immaculate Collection ‡	Madonna	1	24 November 1990	9
24 November 1990	9	The Singles Collection 1984/1990	Jimmy Somerville	4	5 January 1991	1
Albums in 1991
5 January 1991	4	To the Extreme	Vanilla Ice	4	12 January 1991	1
12 January 1991	7	MCMXC a.D.	Enigma	1	26 January 1991	1
26 January 1991	1	A Little Ain't Enough	David Lee Roth	4	26 January 1991	1
26 January 1991	9	Wicked Game	Chris Isaak	3	16 February 1991	1
2 February 1991	2	The Soul Cages	Sting	1	2 February 1991	1
2 February 1991	3	All True Man	Alexander O'Neal	2	2 February 1991	1
2 February 1991	8	Greatest Hits 1977-1990	The Stranglers	4	6 July 1991	1
2 February 1991	1	World Power	Snap!	10	2 February 1991	1
9 February 1991	3	Doubt	Jesus Jones	1	9 February 1991	1
9 February 1991	1	Don't Explain	Robert Palmer	9	9 February 1991	1
9 February 1991	3	Runaway Horses	Belinda Carlisle	6	16 February 1991	2
16 February 1991	4	Innuendo	Queen	1	16 February 1991	2
16 February 1991	6	Into the Light	Gloria Estefan	2	16 February 1991	2
16 February 1991	2	Dedication: The Very Best of Thin Lizzy	Thin Lizzy	8	16 February 1991	2
2 March 1991	4	Circle of One	Oleta Adams	1	2 March 1991	1
2 March 1991	7	The Simpsons Sing the Blues	The Simpsons	6	2 March 1991	1
2 March 1991	1	30 Something	Carter the Unstoppable Sex Machine	8	2 March 1991	1
2 March 1991	1	Free	Rick Astley	9	2 March 1991	1
9 March 1991	8	Auberge	Chris Rea	1	9 March 1991	1
9 March 1991	1	The Best of Free: All Right Now	Free	9	9 March 1991	1
16 March 1991	3	Spartacus	The Farm	1	16 March 1991	1
16 March 1991	7	The White Room	The KLF	3	16 March 1991	1
16 March 1991	2	ex:el	808 State	4	16 March 1991	1
16 March 1991	7	The Complete Picture: The Very Best of Deborah Harry and Blondie	Deborah Harry and Blondie	3	23 March 1991	2
16 March 1991	1	Kill Uncle	Morrissey	8	16 March 1991	1
23 March 1991	27	Out of Time	R.E.M.	1	23 March 1991	1
23 March 1991	4	Inspector Morse (Original Music from the ITV Series)	Barrington Pheloung	4	6 April 1991	1
23 March 1991	2	The Very Best of Joan Armatrading	Joan Armatrading	9	23 March 1991	2
30 March 1991	21	Greatest Hits	Eurythmics	1	30 March 1991	10
6 April 1991	8	Vagabond Heart	Rod Stewart	2	6 April 1991	1
6 April 1991	1	Entreat	The Cure	10	6 April 1991	1
13 April 1991	10	Joyride	Roxette	2	13 April 1991	1
13 April 1991	1	God Fodder	Ned's Atomic Dustbin	4	13 April 1991	1
13 April 1991	1	Mama Said	Lenny Kravitz	8	13 April 1991	1
20 April 1991	5	Real Life	Simple Minds	2	20 April 1991	2
20 April 1991	1	Flashpoint	The Rolling Stones	6	20 April 1991	1
4 May 1991	3	Gold Mother	James	2	4 May 1991	1
4 May 1991	1	The Beast Inside	Inspiral Carpets	5	4 May 1991	1
11 May 1991	2	The Best of The Waterboys 81–90	The Waterboys	2	11 May 1991	1
11 May 1991	1	Union	Yes	7	11 May 1991	1
18 May 1991	11	Time, Love & Tenderness	Michael Bolton	2	18 May 1991	2
18 May 1991	3	Schubert Dip	EMF	3	18 May 1991	1
18 May 1991	6	Sugar Tax	Orchestral Manoeuvres in the Dark	3	17 August 1991	1
25 May 1991	1	Mighty Like a Rose	Elvis Costello	5	25 May 1991	1
25 May 1991	1	De La Soul Is Dead	De La Soul	7	25 May 1991	1
25 May 1991	1	Power of Love	Luther Vandross	9	25 May 1991	1
1 June 1991	19	Seal	Seal	1	1 June 1991	3
1 June 1991	14	Beverley Craven	Beverley Craven	3	1 June 1991	1
1 June 1991	1	Unplugged (The Official Bootleg)	Paul McCartney	7	1 June 1991	1
1 June 1991	2	Memorabilia – The Singles	Soft Cell and Marc Almond	8	1 June 1991	1
8 June 1991	2	Electronic	Electronic	2	8 June 1991	1
8 June 1991	2	Never Loved Elvis	The Wonder Stuff	3	8 June 1991	1
15 June 1991	2	Fellow Hoodlums	Deacon Blue	2	15 June 1991	1
15 June 1991	1	Love and Kisses	Dannii Minogue	8	15 June 1991	1
22 June 1991	2	The Big Wheel	Runrig	4	22 June 1991	1
22 June 1991	1	Slave to the Grind	Skid Row	5	22 June 1991	1
22 June 1991	3	We Are in Love	Harry Connick Jr.	7	29 June 1991	1
22 June 1991	1	The Promise	T'Pau	10	22 June 1991	1
29 June 1991	13	Love Hurts	Cher	1	29 June 1991	6
29 June 1991	1	Stars Crash Down	Hue and Cry	10	29 June 1991	1
6 July 1991	1	Holidays in Eden	Marillion	7	6 July 1991	1
6 July 1991	1	Pop Symphonies	James Last & His Orchestra	10	6 July 1991	1
13 July 1991	4	Greatest Hits	The Jam	2	13 July 1991	3
13 July 1991	1	Hey Stoopid	Alice Cooper	4	13 July 1991	1
13 July 1991	3	Some People's Lives	Bette Midler	5	20 July 1991	1
20 July 1991	2	Into the Great Wide Open	Tom Petty and the Heartbreakers	3	20 July 1991	1
20 July 1991	8	Essential Pavarotti II	Luciano Pavarotti	1	10 August 1991	2
27 July 1991	2	Spellbound	Paula Abdul	4	27 July 1991	1
3 August 1991	3	Gonna Make You Sweat	C+C Music Factory	8	10 August 1991	1
10 August 1991	2	Move to This	Cathy Dennis	3	10 August 1991	1
24 August 1991	2	Metallica	Metallica	1	24 August 1991	1
24 August 1991	5	C.M.B.	Color Me Badd	3	7 September 1991	1
31 August 1991	5	Joseph and the Amazing Technicolor Dreamcoat	Jason Donovan and the Original London Cast	1	31 August 1991	2
7 September 1991	1	Leisure	Blur	7	7 September 1991	1
14 September 1991	15	From Time to Time – The Singles Collection	Paul Young	1	14 September 1991	1
14 September 1991	1	Guaranteed	Level 42	3	14 September 1991	1
14 September 1991	1	Of the Heart, of the Soul and of the Cross: The Utopian Experience	P.M. Dawn	8	14 September 1991	1
14 September 1991	1	Roll the Bones	Rush	10	14 September 1991	1
21 September 1991	5	On Every Street	Dire Straits	1	21 September 1991	1
21 September 1991	2	Mr. Lucky	John Lee Hooker	3	21 September 1991	1
21 September 1991	1	Hymns to the Silence	Van Morrison	5	21 September 1991	1
21 September 1991	1	The Specials Singles	The Specials	10	21 September 1991	1
28 September 1991	4	Use Your Illusion II	Guns N' Roses	1	28 September 1991	1
28 September 1991	3	Use Your Illusion I	Guns N' Roses	2	28 September 1991	1
28 September 1991	4	The Ultimate Collection	Marc Bolan and T. Rex	4	28 September 1991	1
28 September 1991	1	Don't Try This at Home	Billy Bragg	8	28 September 1991	1
28 September 1991	1	Greatest Hits	Jason Donovan	9	28 September 1991	1
5 October 1991	6	Waking Up the Neighbours	Bryan Adams	1	5 October 1991	1
5 October 1991	1	Trompe le Monde	Pixies	7	5 October 1991	1
5 October 1991	1	Screamadelica	Primal Scream	8	5 October 1991	1
5 October 1991	1	Ceremony	The Cult	9	5 October 1991	1
5 October 1991	1	Rock 'til You Drop	Status Quo	10	5 October 1991	1
12 October 1991	51	Stars	Simply Red	1	12 October 1991	12
12 October 1991	10	Diamonds and Pearls	Prince and The New Power Generation	2	12 October 1991	1
12 October 1991	22	Simply the Best	Tina Turner	2	19 October 1991	3
12 October 1991	1	The Best of R.E.M.	R.E.M.	7	19 October 1991	1
19 October 1991	1	The Greatest Hits	Salt-n-Pepa	6	19 October 1991	1
19 October 1991	1	Apocalypse 91... The Enemy Strikes Black	Public Enemy	8	19 October 1991	1
19 October 1991	1	The Best of Daryl Hall & John Oates: Looking Back	Daryl Hall & John Oates	9	19 October 1991	1
26 October 1991	3	Chorus	Erasure	1	26 October 1991	1
26 October 1991	4	Voices	Kenny Thomas	3	26 October 1991	2
26 October 1991	2	Live Your Life Be Free	Belinda Carlisle	7	26 October 1991	1
26 October 1991	8	The Commitments (Original Motion Picture Soundtrack)	The Commitments	4	9 November 1991	1
26 October 1991	8	Emotions ♦	Mariah Carey	4	15 February 1992	1
9 November 1991	18	Greatest Hits II	Queen	1	9 November 1991	5
9 November 1991	2	Timeless – The Very Best of Neil Sedaka	Neil Sedaka	10	9 November 1991	2
16 November 1991	7	Shepherd Moons	Enya	1	16 November 1991	1
16 November 1991	2	Discography: The Complete Singles Collection	Pet Shop Boys	3	16 November 1991	1
16 November 1991	1	Live Baby Live	INXS	8	16 November 1991	1
23 November 1991	21	We Can't Dance	Genesis	1	23 November 1991	2
23 November 1991	19	Real Love ♦	Lisa Stansfield	3	18 January 1992	3
30 November 1991	24	Dangerous	Michael Jackson	1	30 November 1991	1
30 November 1991	5	Achtung Baby	U2	2	30 November 1991	1
7 December 1991	9	Greatest Hits ♦	Queen	6	18 January 1992	1
14 December 1991	8	Michael Crawford Performs Andrew Lloyd Webber	Michael Crawford and the Royal Philharmonic Orchestra	3	21 December 1991	2
14 December 1991	2	Together with Cliff Richard	Cliff Richard	10	14 December 1991	2
21 December 1991	2	The Definitive Simon and Garfunkel	Simon and Garfunkel	8	21 December 1991	2

== See also ==
- 1991 in British music
- List of number-one albums from the 1990s (UK)
