= List of UK top-ten albums in 1990 =

The UK Albums Chart is one of many music charts compiled by the Official Charts Company that calculates the best-selling albums of the week in the United Kingdom. Before 2004, the chart was only based on the sales of physical albums. This list shows albums that peaked in the Top 10 of the UK Albums Chart during 1990, as well as albums which peaked in 1989 and 1991 but were in the top 10 in 1990. The entry date is when the album appeared in the top 10 for the first time (week ending, as published by the Official Charts Company, which is six days after the chart is announced).

One-hundred and nineteen albums were in the top ten this year. Fourteen albums from 1989 remained in the top 10 for several weeks at the beginning of the year, or re-entered during the year, while I'm Your Baby Tonight by Whitney Houston and The Singles Collection 1984/1990 by Jimmy Somerville were both released in 1990 but did not reach their peak until 1991. Forever Your Girl by Paula Abdul, Hangin' Tough by New Kids on the Block, Journeyman by Eric Clapton, Labour of Love II by UB40 and Sleeping with the Past by Elton John were the albums from 1989 to reach their peak in 1990. Eleven artists scored multiple entries in the top 10 in 1990. Alannah Miles, Betty Boo, The Charlatans and The Sundays were among the many artists who achieved their first UK charting top 10 album in 1990.

The 1989 Christmas number-one album, ...But Seriously by Phil Collins, remained at number-one for the first 3 weeks of 1990. The first new number-one album of the year was Colour by The Christians. Overall, seventeen different albums peaked at number-one in 1990, with Luciano Pavarotti (2) having the most albums hit that position.

== Background ==
=== Multiple entries ===
One-hundred and nineteen albums charted in the top 10 in 1990, with one-hundred and three albums reaching their peak this year.

Eleven artists scored multiple entries in the top 10 in 1990.

== Top-ten albums ==
Key

Symbol	Meaning
‡	Album peaked in 1989 but still in chart in 1990.
♦	Album released in 1990 but peaked in 1991.
(#)	Year-end top ten album position and rank
Entered	The date that the album first appeared in the chart.
Peak	Highest position that the song reached in the UK Albums Chart.

Entered (week ending)	Weeks in top 10	Single	Artist	Peak	Peak reached (week ending)	Weeks at peak
Albums in 1989
18 February 1989	17	The Raw & the Cooked ‡	Fine Young Cannibals	1	18 February 1989	1
1 April 1989	12	Like a Prayer ‡	Madonna	1	1 April 1989	2
15 April 1989	6	Forever Your Girl	Paula Abdul	3	12 May 1990	1
22 April 1989	17	Club Classics Vol. One ‡	Soul II Soul	1	15 July 1989	1
13 May 1989	29	Ten Good Reasons ‡	Jason Donovan	1	20 May 1989	4
23 September 1989	17	Sleeping with the Past	Elton John	1	28 July 1990	5
30 September 1989	18	Foreign Affair ‡	Tina Turner	1	30 September 1989	1
21 October 1989	16	Enjoy Yourself ‡	Kylie Minogue	1	21 October 1989	1
11 November 1989	20	The Road to Hell ‡	Chris Rea	1	11 November 1989	3
11 November 1989	7	Holding Back the River ‡	Wet Wet Wet	2	11 November 1989	1
18 November 1989	9	Journeyman	Eric Clapton	2	17 February 1990	2
25 November 1989	11	The Best of Rod Stewart ‡	Rod Stewart	3	25 November 1989	1
2 December 1989	42	...But Seriously ‡	Phil Collins	1	2 December 1989	15
2 December 1989	16	Affection ‡	Lisa Stansfield	2	2 December 1989	2
9 December 1989	7	Jive Bunny: The Album ‡	Jive Bunny	2	9 December 1989	5
9 December 1989	9	Hangin' Tough	New Kids on the Block	2	20 January 1990	1
9 December 1989	12	Labour of Love II	UB40	3	19 May 1990	1
Albums in 1990
27 January 1990	3	Colour	The Christians	1	27 January 1990	1
27 January 1990	1	Reading, Writing and Arithmetic	The Sundays	4	27 January 1990	1
27 January 1990	1	The Love Songs	Dionne Warwick	6	27 January 1990	1
3 February 1990	4	The Very Best of Cat Stevens	Cat Stevens	4	3 February 1990	1
10 February 1990	1	A Bit of What You Fancy	The Quireboys	2	10 February 1990	1
10 February 1990	2	The Sweet Keeper	Tanita Tikaram	3	10 February 1990	1
10 February 1990	1	Vigil in a Wilderness of Mirrors	Fish	5	10 February 1990	1
10 February 1990	6	Pump Up the Jam	Technotronic	2	10 March 1990	1
17 February 1990	1	Carved in Sand	The Mission	7	17 February 1990	1
17 February 1990	4	Heart of Stone	Cher	7	24 February 1990	2
17 February 1990	1	The Language of Life	Everything But the Girl	10	17 February 1990	1
24 February 1990	1	Miss Saigon	Original London Cast	4	24 February 1990	1
24 February 1990	1	Waking Hours	Del Amitri	6	24 February 1990	1
24 February 1990	1	Running Free/Sanctuary (The First Ten Years)	Iron Maiden	10	24 February 1990	1
3 March 1990	1	Women in Uniform/Twilight Zone (The First Ten Years)	Iron Maiden	10	3 March 1990	1
10 March 1990	1	Purgatory/Maiden Japan (The First Ten Years)	Iron Maiden	5	10 March 1990	1
10 March 1990	1	The House of Love	The House of Love	8	10 March 1990	1
17 March 1990	2	Missing...Presumed Having a Good Time	The Notting Hillbillies	2	17 March 1990	1
17 March 1990	1	Run to the Hills/The Number of the Beast (The First Ten Years)	Iron Maiden	3	17 March 1990	1
17 March 1990	10	Vivaldi: The Four Seasons	Nigel Kennedy and the English Chamber Orchestra	3	24 March 1990	1
17 March 1990	23	Soul Provider	Michael Bolton	4	8 September 1990	1
24 March 1990	4	I Do Not Want What I Haven't Got	Sinéad O'Connor	1	24 March 1990	1
24 March 1990	6	Changesbowie	David Bowie	1	31 March 1990	1
24 March 1990	1	Flight of Icarus/The Trooper (The First Ten Years)	Iron Maiden	7	24 March 1990	1
24 March 1990	14	The Essential Pavarotti	Luciano Pavarotti	1	23 June 1990	4
31 March 1990	3	Violator	Depeche Mode	2	31 March 1990	1
31 March 1990	13	Only Yesterday – Richard & Karen Carpenter's Greatest Hits	The Carpenters	1	7 April 1990	7
31 March 1990	2	Cosmic Thing	The B-52s	8	7 April 1990	1
7 April 1990	3	The Best of Van Morrison	Van Morrison	4	7 April 1990	2
7 April 1990	1	Running Free/Run to the Hills (The First Ten Years)	Iron Maiden	9	7 April 1990	1
14 April 1990	4	Brigade	Heart	3	14 April 1990	1
14 April 1990	1	Wasted Years/Stranger in a Strange Land (The First Ten Years)	Iron Maiden	9	14 April 1990	1
21 April 1990	6	Behind the Mask	Fleetwood Mac	1	21 April 1990	1
21 April 1990	3	Absolutely	ABC	7	21 April 1990	1
21 April 1990	1	Can I Play with Madness/The Evil That Men Do (The First Ten Years)	Iron Maiden	10	21 April 1990	1
28 April 1990	5	Alannah Myles	Alannah Myles	3	28 April 1990	1
28 April 1990	1	Fear of a Black Planet	Public Enemy	4	28 April 1990	1
28 April 1990	1	Days of Open Hand	Suzanne Vega	7	28 April 1990	1
5 May 1990	3	Life	Inspiral Carpets	2	5 May 1990	1
5 May 1990	2	Everybody Knows	Sonia	7	5 May 1990	1
12 May 1990	2	A Pocketful of Dreams	Big Fun	7	19 May 1990	1
26 May 1990	5	Through a Big Country: Greatest Hits	Big Country	2	26 May 1990	1
2 June 1990	7	Vol. II: 1990 – A New Decade	Soul II Soul	1	2 June 1990	3
2 June 1990	8	I'm Breathless: Music from and Inspired by the Film "Dick Tracy"	Madonna	2	2 June 1990	2
2 June 1990	1	Passion and Warfare	Steve Vai	8	2 June 1990	1
9 June 1990	7	Between the Lines	Jason Donovan	2	9 June 1990	2
9 June 1990	5	Natural History: The Very Best of Talk Talk	Talk Talk	3	16 June 1990	1
16 June 1990	1	Other Voices	Paul Young	4	16 June 1990	1
16 June 1990	1	Home	Hothouse Flowers	5	16 June 1990	1
23 June 1990	10	Summer Dreams	The Beach Boys	2	23 June 1990	1
23 June 1990	8	Greatest Hits	The Bangles	4	23 June 1990	1
30 June 1990	12	Step by Step	New Kids on the Block	1	30 June 1990	1
30 June 1990	4	Wilson Phillips	Wilson Phillips	7	7 July 1990	1
7 July 1990	7	Hot Rocks 1964-1971	The Rolling Stones	3	14 July 1990	1
14 July 1990	1	Compositions	Anita Baker	7	14 July 1990	1
21 July 1990	3	Flesh and Blood	Poison	3	21 July 1990	1
21 July 1990	1	Goodnight L.A.	Magnum	9	21 July 1990	1
4 August 1990	4	Please Hammer, Don't Hurt 'Em	MC Hammer	8	11 August 1990	2
11 August 1990	2	Craig McLachlan & Check 1-2	Craig McLachlan & Check 1-2	10	11 August 1990	2
18 August 1990	2	Lovegod	The Soup Dragons	7	18 August 1990	1
25 August 1990	4	Young Guns II: Blaze of Glory	Jon Bon Jovi	2	25 August 1990	1
25 August 1990	2	Bossanova	Pixies	3	25 August 1990	1
1 September 1990	2	Graffiti Bridge	Prince	1	1 September 1990	1
1 September 1990	22	Carreras Domingo Pavarotti in Concert	José Carreras, Placido Domingo and Luciano Pavarotti	1	8 September 1990	5
1 September 1990	1	Liberty	Duran Duran	8	1 September 1990	1
1 September 1990	5	Look Sharp	Roxette	4	15 September 1990	1
8 September 1990	1	Jordan: The Comeback	Prefab Sprout	7	8 September 1990	1
15 September 1990	19	Listen Without Prejudice Vol. 1	George Michael	1	15 September 1990	1
15 September 1990	3	Mariah Carey	Mariah Carey	6	15 September 1990	1
15 September 1990	2	Stepping Out: The Very Best of Joe Jackson	Joe Jackson	7	15 September 1990	1
22 September 1990	4	Ooh Las Vegas	Deacon Blue	3	22 September 1990	2
22 September 1990	4	Boomania	Betty Boo	4	22 September 1990	2
29 September 1990	2	Room to Roam	The Waterboys	5	29 September 1990	1
29 September 1990	1	Heaven or Las Vegas	Cocteau Twins	7	29 September 1990	1
6 October 1990	3	X	INXS	2	6 October 1990	1
6 October 1990	1	The Razors Edge	AC/DC	4	6 October 1990	1
6 October 1990	1	Rust in Peace	Megadeth	8	6 October 1990	1
13 October 1990	2	No Prayer for the Dying	Iron Maiden	2	13 October 1990	1
13 October 1990	5	Reflection	The Shadows	5	27 October 1990	1
13 October 1990	1	Doctor Adamski's Musical Pharmacy	Adamski	8	13 October 1990	1
20 October 1990	2	Some Friendly	The Charlatans	1	20 October 1990	1
20 October 1990	9	Rocking All Over the Years	Status Quo	2	20 October 1990	2
20 October 1990	1	Enlightenment	Van Morrison	5	20 October 1990	1
27 October 1990	10	The Rhythm of the Saints	Paul Simon	1	27 October 1990	2
27 October 1990	1	Recycler	ZZ Top	8	27 October 1990	1
27 October 1990	1	Bona Drag	Morrissey	9	27 October 1990	1
27 October 1990	2	Led Zeppelin Remasters	Led Zeppelin	10	27 October 1990	2
3 November 1990	2	Behaviour	Pet Shop Boys	2	3 November 1990	1
3 November 1990	2	Cornerstones: 1967–1970	Jimi Hendrix	5	3 November 1990	1
3 November 1990	1	New Kids on the Block	New Kids on the Block	6	3 November 1990	1
3 November 1990	2	Trip on This: The Remixes	Technotronic	7	10 November 1990	1
10 November 1990	20	The Very Best of Elton John	Elton John	1	10 November 1990	2
10 November 1990	3	Choke	The Beautiful South	2	10 November 1990	1
17 November 1990	12	Serious Hits... Live!	Phil Collins	2	17 November 1990	1
17 November 1990	1	Pills 'n' Thrills and Bellyaches	Happy Mondays	4	17 November 1990	1
17 November 1990	10	I'm Your Baby Tonight ♦	Whitney Houston	4	19 January 1991	1
17 November 1990	1	Mixed Up	The Cure	8	17 November 1990	1
17 November 1990	8	From a Distance: The Event	Cliff Richard	3	29 December 1990	1
24 November 1990	27	The Immaculate Collection	Madonna	1	24 November 1990	9
24 November 1990	9	The Singles Collection 1984/1990 ♦	Jimmy Somerville	4	5 January 1991	1
24 November 1990	1	Rhythm of Love	Kylie Minogue	9	24 November 1990	1
1 December 1990	4	The Very Best of the Bee Gees	Bee Gees	8	8 December 1990	2

== Entries by artist ==
The following table shows artists who achieved two or more top 10 entries in 1990, including albums that reached their peak in 1989. The figures only include main artists, with featured artists and appearances on compilation albums not counted individually for each artist. The total number of weeks an artist spent in the top ten in 1990 is also shown.

Entries	Artist	Weeks	Albums
9	Iron Maiden	10	Can I Play with Madness/The Evil That Men Do (The First Ten Years), Flight of Icarus/The Trooper (The First Ten Years), No Prayer for the Dying, Purgatory/Maiden Japan (The First Ten Years), Run to the Hills/The Number of the Beast (The First Ten Years), Running Free/Run to the Hills (The First Ten Years), Running Free/Sanctuary (The First Ten Years), Wasted Years/Stranger in a Strange Land (The First Ten Years), Women in Uniform/Twilight Zone (The First Ten Years)

== Notes ==
- Foreign Affair re-entered the top 10 at number 8 on 3 March 1990 (week ending) for 5 weeks.
- The Road to Hell re-entered the top 10 at number 8 on 17 February 1990 (week ending) for 7 weeks.
- Hangin' Tough re-entered the top 10 at number 8 on 6 January 1990 (week ending) for 6 weeks and at number 9 on 19 May 1990 (week ending) for 2 weeks.
- Like a Prayer re-entered the top 10 at number 10 on 6 January 1990 (week ending) for 2 weeks.
- Club Classics Volume One re-entered the top 10 at number 8 on 20 January 1990 (week ending).
- The Best of Rod Stewart re-entered the top 10 at number 10 on 20 January 1990 (week ending), at number 10 on 3 February 1990 (week ending) and at number 6 on 3 March 1990 (week ending) for 3 weeks.
- Journeyman re-entered the top 10 at number 7 on 27 January 1990 (week ending) for 7 weeks.
- The First Ten Years was a collection released to celebrate Iron Maiden's tenth anniversary. It combined various singles as double EPs which charted individually.
- The Raw and the Cooked re-entered the top 10 at number 9 on 3 March 1990 (week ending).
- Vivaldi - The Four Seasons re-entered the top 10 at number 5 on 5 May 1990 (week ending) for 4 weeks.
- Soul Provider re-entered the top 10 at number 9 on 26 May 1990 (week ending) for 3 weeks, at number 10 on 25 August 1990 (week ending) for 10 weeks and at number 10 on 1 December 1990 (week ending) for 8 weeks.
- The Essential Pavarotti re-entered the top 10 at number 8 on 16 June 1990 (week ending) for 11 weeks.
- Labour of Love II re-entered the top 10 at number 8 on 14 April 1990 (week ending) for 10 weeks and at number 9 on 23 June 1990 (week ending) for 2 weeks.
- Forever Your Girl re-entered the top 10 at number 3 on 12 May 1990 (week ending) for 4 weeks.
- I'm Breathless re-entered the top 10 at number 5 on 28 July 1990 (week ending) for 5 weeks.
- Cosmic Thing re-entered the top 10 at number 10 on 2 June 1990 (week ending) for 2 weeks.
- Between the Lines re-entered the top 10 at number 7 on 21 July 1990 (week ending) for 2 weeks.
- Natural History: The Very Best of Talk Talk re-entered the top 10 at number 6 on 14 July 1990 (week ending).
- Wilson Phillips re-entered the top 10 at number 10 on 8 September 1990 (week ending) and at number 10 on 22 September 1990 (week ending).
- Sleeping with the Past re-entered the top 10 at number 2 on 7 July 1990 (week ending) for 16 weeks.
- Please Hammer, Don't Hurt 'Em re-entered the top 10 at number 10 on 26 January 1991 (week ending).
- Listen Without Prejudice Vol. 1 re-entered the top 10 at number 10 on 29 December 1990 (week ending) for 4 weeks, at number 3 on 23 February 1991 (week ending) for 5 weeks and at number 7 on 30 March 1991 (week ending) for 2 weeks.
- The Very Best of Elton John re-entered the top 10 at number 9 on 6 April 1991 (week ending).
- I'm Your Baby Tonight re-entered the top 10 at number 8 on 22 December 1990 (week ending) for 8 weeks and at number 9 on 23 February 1991 (week ending).
- The Immaculate Collection re-entered the top 10 at number 7 on 23 March 1991 (week ending) for 3 weeks, at number 10 on 20 April 1991 (week ending) and at number 3 on 3 August 1991 (week ending) for 7 weeks.
- Figure includes album that peaked in 1989.
- Figure includes album that first charted in 1989 but peaked in 1990.

== See also ==
- 1990 in British music
- List of number-one albums from the 1990s (UK)
