= List of UK Albums Chart number ones of the 1990s =

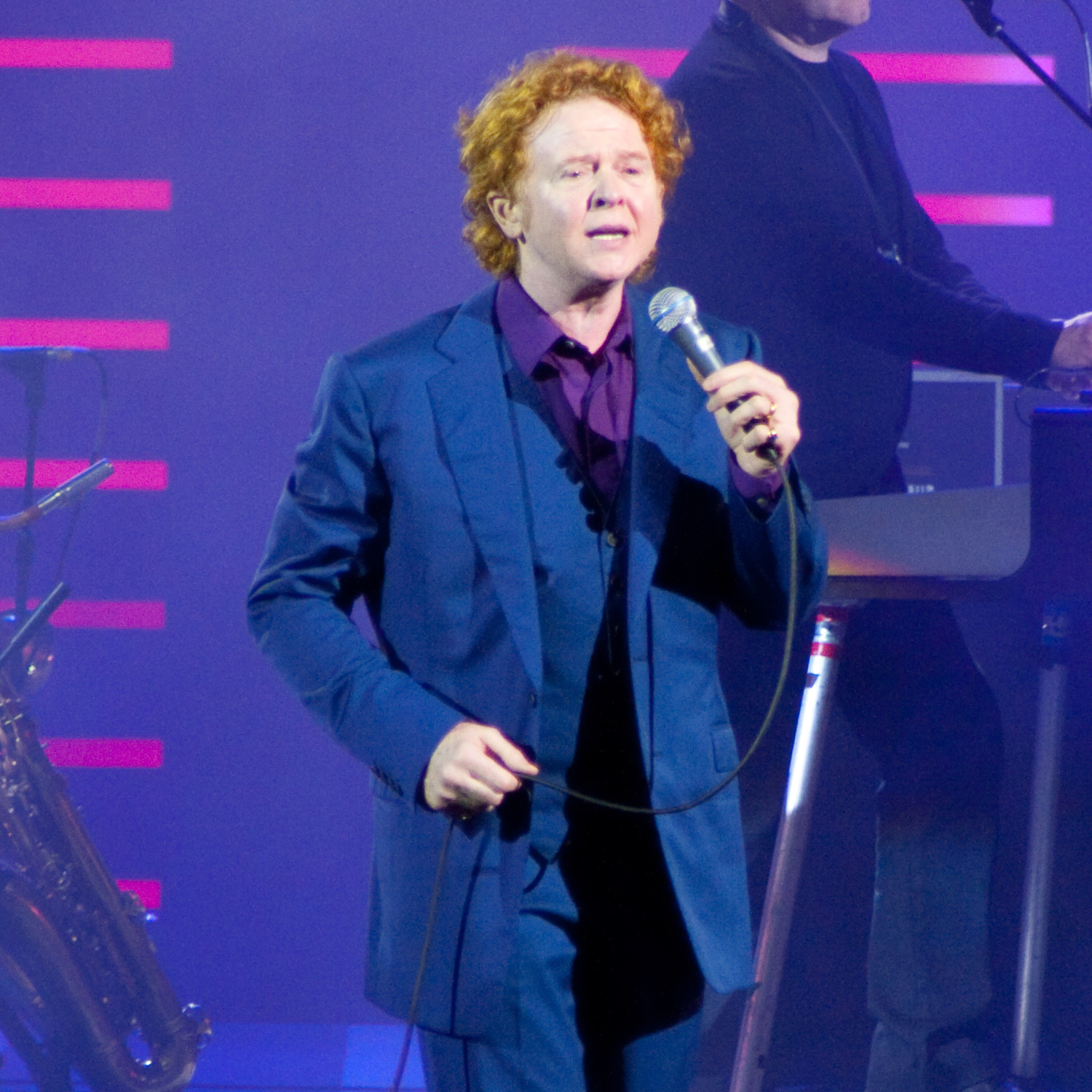
British band Simply Red spent 19 weeks at the top of the UK Albums Chart during the 1990s, longer than any other act.

The UK Albums Chart is a weekly record chart based on album sales from Sunday to Saturday in the United Kingdom; during the 1990s, a total of 216 albums reached number one. Until 1 February 1994, the chart was compiled each week by Gallup – after this date, it was managed by Millward Brown, who expanded the number of sales figures sampled, and extended the use of electronic point of sale machines. From July 1998 onwards, compilation of the chart was overseen by the Chart Information Network, jointly operated by the British Phonographic Industry (BPI) and the British Association of Record Dealers. Throughout the decade, the chart was based solely on physical album sales, and each week's number one was first announced on Sunday evenings on The Radio 1 Chart Show.

The most successful artist of the 1990s was British band Simply Red, who topped the UK Albums Chart for 19 weeks with four different albums. Stars, their fourth studio album, sold 3.29 million copies in total, and was the biggest-selling album of both 1991 and 1992. Stars was the second biggest-selling album of the decade; it was outsold by Manchester band Oasis's second album, (What's the Story) Morning Glory?, which spent 10 weeks at number one during 1995 and 1996, and sold 4.16 million copies. It was the highest-certified album of the 1990s, achieving platinum certification 13 times. Following the album's success, Oasis's follow-up, Be Here Now, sold 663,000 copies in the first four days of its release, making it the fastest-selling album in UK chart history.

The first number-one album of the 1990s was ...But Seriously by Phil Collins – released in 1989, ...But Seriously first reached number one in December of that year, and remained at the top for eight weeks. It stayed at number one for nine weeks during the decade, and was the biggest-selling album of 1990. The final number one of the 1990s was Come On Over by Shania Twain. Like ...But Seriously, Come on Over remained at number one into the following decade, and was the biggest-selling album of its year. In chart terms, the most successful album of the nineties was Spice, the debut album from the Spice Girls, which spent 15 weeks at number one over five separate runs. The Spice Girls' record label, Virgin Records, was the most successful label of the decade – with an artist roster that included the Spice Girls, Phil Collins and Meat Loaf, Virgin topped the albums chart with 19 different albums for a total of 62 weeks.

== Number ones ==
Key
No.	nth album to top the UK Albums Chart
re	Return of an album to number one
Silver	Silver certification (60,000 units)
Gold	Gold certification (100,000 units)
Platinum	Platinum certification (300,000 units)
†	Best-selling album of the year
‡	Best-selling album of the decade

No.	Artist (Note: The artist, album, week ending date of reaching number one and number of weeks at number one are those given by the OCC.)	Album	Record label (Note: The record labels are those given by the OCC.)	Reached number one (for the week ending)	Weeks at number one	Certification (as of 31 December 1999) (Note: The certifications are those awarded by the BPI as of 31 December 1999.)
1990
402	Phil Collins	...But Seriously †	Virgin	2 December 1989	8	8× Platinum
403	The Christians	Colour	Island	27 January 1990	1	Platinum
re	Phil Collins	...But Seriously †	Virgin	3 February 1990	7	8× Platinum
404	Sinéad O'Connor	I Do Not Want What I Haven't Got	Ensign	24 March 1990	1	2× Platinum
405	David Bowie	Changesbowie	EMI	31 March 1990	1	Gold
406	The Carpenters	Only Yesterday: Richard and Karen Carpenter's Greatest Hits	A&M	7 April 1990	2	4× Platinum
407	Fleetwood Mac	Behind the Mask	Warner Bros.	21 April 1990	1	Platinum
re	The Carpenters	Only Yesterday: Richard and Karen Carpenter's Greatest Hits	A&M	28 April 1990	5	4× Platinum
408	Soul II Soul	Vol. II: 1990 – A New Decade	10	2 June 1990	3	Platinum
409	Luciano Pavarotti	The Essential Pavarotti	Decca	23 June 1990	1	3× Platinum
410	New Kids on the Block	Step by Step	CBS	30 June 1990	1	Platinum
re	Luciano Pavarotti	The Essential Pavarotti	Decca	7 July 1990	3	3× Platinum
411	Elton John	Sleeping with the Past	Rocket	28 July 1990	5	3× Platinum
412	Prince	Graffiti Bridge	Paisley Park	1 September 1990	1	Gold
413	Luciano Pavarotti/Plácido Domingo/José Carreras	In Concert	Decca	8 September 1990	1	5× Platinum
414	George Michael	Listen Without Prejudice Vol. 1	Epic	15 September 1990	1	4× Platinum
re	Luciano Pavarotti/Plácido Domingo/José Carreras	In Concert	Decca	22 September 1990	4	5× Platinum
415	The Charlatans	Some Friendly	Situation Two	20 October 1990	1	Gold
416	Paul Simon	The Rhythm of the Saints	Warner Bros.	27 October 1990	2	2× Platinum
417	Elton John	The Very Best of Elton John	Rocket	10 November 1990	2	9× Platinum
418	Madonna	The Immaculate Collection	Sire	24 November 1990	9	12× Platinum
1991
419	Enigma	MCMXC a.D.	Virgin	26 January 1991	1	3× Platinum
420	Sting	The Soul Cages	A&M	2 February 1991	1	Gold
421	Jesus Jones	Doubt	Food	9 February 1991	1	Gold
422	Queen	Innuendo	Parlophone	16 February 1991	2	Platinum
423	Oleta Adams	Circle of One	Fontana	2 March 1991	1	Gold
424	Chris Rea	Auberge	East West	9 March 1991	1	2× Platinum
425	The Farm	Spartacus	Produce	16 March 1991	1	Gold
426	R.E.M.	Out of Time	Warner Bros.	23 March 1991	1	5× Platinum
427	Eurythmics	Greatest Hits	RCA	30 March 1991	9	6× Platinum
428 (Note: Seal released two number-one albums during the 1990s, both of which were eponymously titled.)	Seal	Seal	ZTT	1 June 1991	3	2× Platinum
re	Eurythmics	Greatest Hits	RCA	22 June 1991	1	6× Platinum
429	Cher	Love Hurts	Geffen	29 June 1991	6	3× Platinum
430	Luciano Pavarotti	Essential Pavarotti II	Decca	10 August 1991	2	Platinum
431	Metallica	Metallica	Vertigo	24 August 1991	1	3x Platinum
432	Jason Donovan/London cast	Joseph and the Amazing Technicolor Dreamcoat	Really Useful/Polydor	31 August 1991	2	Platinum
433	Paul Young	From Time to Time – The Singles Collection	Columbia	14 September 1991	1	3× Platinum
434	Dire Straits	On Every Street	Vertigo	21 September 1991	1	2× Platinum
435	Guns N' Roses	Use Your Illusion II	Geffen	28 September 1991	1	Platinum
436	Bryan Adams	Waking Up the Neighbours	A&M	5 October 1991	1	3× Platinum
437	Simply Red	Stars †	East West	12 October 1991	2	12× Platinum
438	Erasure	Chorus	Mute	26 October 1991	1	Platinum
re	Simply Red	Stars †	East West	2 November 1991	1	12× Platinum
439	Queen	Greatest Hits II	Parlophone	9 November 1991	1	5× Platinum
440	Enya	Shepherd Moons	WEA	16 November 1991	1	4× Platinum
441	Genesis	We Can't Dance	Virgin	23 November 1991	1	5× Platinum
442	Michael Jackson	Dangerous	Epic Records	30 November 1991	1	6× Platinum
re	Queen	Greatest Hits II	Parlophone	7 December 1991	4	5× Platinum
1992
re	Simply Red	Stars †	East West	4 January 1992	5	12× Platinum
443	Wet Wet Wet	High on the Happy Side	The Precious Organisation	8 February 1992	2	Platinum
re	Simply Red	Stars †	East West	22 February 1992	3	12× Platinum
444	Madness	Divine Madness	Virgin	14 March 1992	3	3× Platinum
445	Bruce Springsteen	Human Touch	Columbia	4 April 1992	1	Gold
446	Def Leppard	Adrenalize	Bludgeon Riffola	11 April 1992	1	Gold
447	Annie Lennox	Diva	RCA	18 April 1992	1	4× Platinum
448	Right Said Fred	Up	Tug	25 April 1992	1	2× Platinum
449	The Cure	Wish	Fiction	2 May 1992	1	Gold
re	Simply Red	Stars †	East West	9 May 1992	1	12× Platinum
450	Carter the Unstoppable Sex Machine	1992 – The Love Album	Chrysalis	16 May 1992	1	Gold
451	Iron Maiden	Fear of the Dark	EMI	23 May 1992	1	Gold
452	Michael Ball	Michael Ball	Polydor	30 May 1992	1	Gold
453	Lionel Richie	Back to Front	Motown	6 June 1992	6	4× Platinum
454	The Orb	U.F.Orb	Big Life	18 July 1992	1	None
455	Neil Diamond	The Greatest Hits: 1966–1992	Columbia	25 July 1992	3	Platinum
456	INXS	Welcome to Wherever You Are	Mercury	15 August 1992	1	Gold
re	Genesis	We Can't Dance	Virgin	22 August 1992	1	5× Platinum
457	The Smiths	Best...I	WEA	29 August 1992	1	Gold
458	Kylie Minogue	Greatest Hits	PWL International	5 September 1992	1	Platinum
459	Mike Oldfield	Tubular Bells II	WEA	12 September 1992	2	2× Platinum
460	Belinda Carlisle	The Best of Belinda, Volume 1	Virgin	26 September 1992	1	2× Platinum
461	ABBA	Gold: Greatest Hits	Polydor	3 October 1992	1	18× Platinum
462	R.E.M.	Automatic for the People	Warner Bros.	10 October 1992	1	6× Platinum
463	Prince and The New Power Generation	Symbol	Paisley Park	17 October 1992	1	Platinum
464	Simple Minds	Glittering Prize 81/92	Virgin	24 October 1992	3	3× Platinum
465	Bon Jovi	Keep the Faith	Jambco	14 November 1992	1	Platinum
466	Cher	Greatest Hits: 1965–1992	Geffen	21 November 1992	1	3× Platinum
467	Erasure	Pop! The First 20 Hits	Mute	28 November 1992	2	3× Platinum
re	Cher	Greatest Hits: 1965–1992	Geffen	12 December 1992	6	3× Platinum
1993
468	Genesis	The Way We Walk, Volume Two: The Longs	Charisma	23 January 1993	2	Gold
469	Little Angels	Jam	Polydor	6 February 1993	1	Silver
470	The Cult	Pure Cult: for Rockers, Ravers, Lovers, and Sinners	Beggars Banquet	13 February 1993	1	Gold
471	Buddy Holly & The Crickets	Words of Love	PolyGram TV/MCA	20 February 1993	1	Gold
472	East 17	Walthamstow	London	27 February 1993	1	Platinum
re	Annie Lennox	Diva	RCA	6 March 1993	1	4× Platinum
473	Lenny Kravitz	Are You Gonna Go My Way	Virgin	13 March 1993	2	Platinum
474	Hot Chocolate	Their Greatest Hits	EMI	27 March 1993	1	Platinum
475	Depeche Mode	Songs of Faith and Devotion	Mute	3 April 1993	1	Gold
476	Suede	Suede	Nude	10 April 1993	1	Gold
477	David Bowie	Black Tie White Noise	Arista	17 April 1993	1	Gold
re	R.E.M.	Automatic for the People	Warner Bros.	24 April 1993	1	6× Platinum
478	Cliff Richard	The Album	EMI	1 May 1993	1	Gold
re	R.E.M.	Automatic for the People	Warner Bros.	8 May 1993	1	6× Platinum
479	New Order	Republic	Centredate Co	15 May 1993	1	Gold
re	R.E.M.	Automatic for the People	Warner Bros.	22 May 1993	1	6× Platinum
480	Janet Jackson	Janet	Virgin	29 May 1993	2	2× Platinum
481	2 Unlimited	No Limits	PWL Continental	12 June 1993	1	None
482	Tina Turner	What's Love Got to Do with It	Parlophone	19 June 1993	1	Platinum
483	Jamiroquai	Emergency on Planet Earth	Sony S2	26 June 1993	3	Platinum
484	U2	Zooropa	Island	17 July 1993	1	Platinum
485	UB40	Promises and Lies	DEP International	24 July 1993	7	2× Platinum
486	Mariah Carey	Music Box	Columbia	11 September 1993	1	5× Platinum
487	Meat Loaf	Bat Out of Hell II: Back into Hell †	Virgin	18 September 1993	1	6× Platinum
488	Nirvana	In Utero	Geffen	25 September 1993	1	Gold
re	Meat Loaf	Bat Out of Hell II: Back into Hell †	Virgin	2 October 1993	1	6× Platinum
489	Pet Shop Boys	Very	Parlophone	9 October 1993	1	Platinum
re	Meat Loaf	Bat Out of Hell II: Back into Hell †	Virgin	16 October 1993	1	6× Platinum
490	Take That	Everything Changes	RCA	23 October 1993	1	4× Platinum
re	Meat Loaf	Bat Out of Hell II: Back into Hell †	Virgin	30 October 1993	3	6× Platinum
491	Phil Collins	Both Sides	Virgin	20 November 1993	1	2× Platinum
re	Meat Loaf	Bat Out of Hell II: Back into Hell †	Virgin	27 November 1993	5	6× Platinum
1994
492	Diana Ross	One Woman: The Ultimate Collection	EMI	1 January 1994	1	4× Platinum
re	Take That	Everything Changes	RCA	8 January 1994	1	4× Platinum
493	Bryan Adams	So Far So Good	A&M	15 January 1994	1	2× Platinum
re	Diana Ross	One Woman: The Ultimate Collection	EMI	22 January 1994	1	4× Platinum
494	Chaka Demus & Pliers	Tease Me	Mango	29 January 1994	2	Platinum
495	Tori Amos	Under the Pink	East West	12 February 1994	1	Platinum
496	Enigma	The Cross of Changes	Virgin	19 February 1994	1	Platinum
re	Mariah Carey	Music Box	Columbia	26 February 1994	4	5× Platinum
497	Morrissey	Vauxhall and I	Parlophone	26 March 1994	1	Gold
re	Mariah Carey	Music Box	Columbia	2 April 1994	1	5× Platinum
498	Pink Floyd	The Division Bell	EMI	9 April 1994	4	2× Platinum
499	Blur	Parklife	Food	7 May 1994	1	4× Platinum
500	Deacon Blue	Our Town – The Greatest Hits	Columbia	14 May 1994	2	2× Platinum
501	Erasure	I Say I Say I Say	Mute	28 May 1994	1	Gold
502	Seal	Seal	ZTT	4 June 1994	2	2× Platinum
503	2 Unlimited	Real Things	PWL	18 June 1994	1	Gold
504	The Cranberries	Everybody Else Is Doing It, So Why Can't We?	Island	25 June 1994	1	2× Platinum
505	Ace of Base	Happy Nation	London	2 July 1994	2	2× Platinum
506	The Prodigy	Music for the Jilted Generation	XL	16 July 1994	1	Platinum
507	The Rolling Stones	Voodoo Lounge	Virgin	23 July 1994	1	Gold
508	Wet Wet Wet	End of Part One: Their Greatest Hits	The Precious Organisation	30 July 1994	4	4× Platinum
509	Prince	Come	Warner Bros.	27 August 1994	1	Gold
re	Wet Wet Wet	End of Part One: Their Greatest Hits	The Precious Organisation	3 September 1994	1	4× Platinum
510	Oasis	Definitely Maybe	Creation	10 September 1994	1	7× Platinum
511	Luciano Pavarotti/Plácido Domingo/José Carreras	The Three Tenors in Concert 1994	Teldec	17 September 1994	1	2× Platinum
512	Eric Clapton	From the Cradle	Duck	24 September 1994	1	Gold
513	Luther Vandross	Songs	Epic	1 October 1994	1	Platinum
514	R.E.M.	Monster	Warner Bros.	8 October 1994	2	3× Platinum
515	Bon Jovi	Cross Road †	Jambco/Mercury	22 October 1994	3	6× Platinum
516	Nirvana	MTV Unplugged in New York	Geffen	12 November 1994	1	Platinum
re	Bon Jovi	Cross Road †	Jambco/Mercury	19 November 1994	2	6× Platinum
517	The Beautiful South	Carry On up the Charts	Go! Discs	3 December 1994	1	6× Platinum
518	The Beatles	Live at the BBC	Parlophone	10 December 1994	1	2× Platinum
re	The Beautiful South	Carry On up the Charts	Go! Discs	17 December 1994	6	6× Platinum
1995
519	Celine Dion	The Colour of My Love	Epic	28 January 1995	6	5× Platinum
520	Bruce Springsteen	Greatest Hits	Columbia	11 March 1995	1	2× Platinum
521	Annie Lennox	Medusa	RCA	18 March 1995	1	2× Platinum
522	Elastica	Elastica	Deceptive	25 March 1995	1	Gold
re	Celine Dion	The Colour of My Love	Epic	1 April 1995	1	5× Platinum
523	The Boo Radleys	Wake Up!	Creation	8 April 1995	1	Gold
re	Bruce Springsteen	Greatest Hits	Columbia	15 April 1995	1	2× Platinum
524	Wet Wet Wet	Picture This	The Precious Organisation	22 April 1995	3	3× Platinum
525	Take That	Nobody Else	RCA	13 May 1995	2	2× Platinum
526	Paul Weller	Stanley Road	Go! Discs	27 May 1995	1	4× Platinum
527	Alison Moyet	Singles	Columbia	3 June 1995	1	Platinum
528	Pink Floyd	Pulse	EMI	10 June 1995	2	Gold
529	Michael Jackson	HIStory: Past, Present and Future, Book I	Epic	24 June 1995	1	4× Platinum
530	Bon Jovi	These Days	Mercury	1 July 1995	4	4× Platinum
531	Supergrass	I Should Coco	Parlophone	29 July 1995	3	Platinum
532	Black Grape	It's Great When You're Straight... Yeah	Radioactive	19 August 1995	2	Platinum
533	Boyzone	Said and Done	Polydor	2 September 1995	1	3× Platinum
534	The Charlatans	The Charlatans	Beggars Banquet	9 September 1995	1	Gold
535	Levellers	Zeitgeist	China	16 September 1995	1	Gold
536	Blur	The Great Escape	Food	23 September 1995	2	3× Platinum
537	Mariah Carey	Daydream	Columbia	7 October 1995	1	2× Platinum
538	Oasis	(What's the Story) Morning Glory? ‡	Creation	14 October 1995	1	14× Platinum
539	Simply Red	Life	East West	21 October 1995	3	5× Platinum
540	Pulp	Different Class	Island	11 November 1995	1	4× Platinum
541	Queen	Made in Heaven	Parlophone	18 November 1995	1	4× Platinum
542	Robson & Jerome	Robson & Jerome †	RCA	25 November 1995	7	5× Platinum
1996
re	Oasis	(What's the Story) Morning Glory? ‡	Creation	13 January 1996	6	14× Platinum
543	The Bluetones	Expecting to Fly	Superior Quality	24 February 1996	1	Platinum
re	Oasis	(What's the Story) Morning Glory? ‡	Creation	2 March 1996	3	14× Platinum
544	Celine Dion	Falling into You	Epic	23 March 1996	1	7× Platinum
545	The Beatles	Anthology 2	Apple	30 March 1996	1	Platinum
546	Take That	Greatest Hits	RCA	6 April 1996	4	3× Platinum
547	Alanis Morissette	Jagged Little Pill †	Maverick	4 May 1996	2	10× Platinum
548	Ash	1977	Infectious	18 May 1996	1	Platinum
549	George Michael	Older	Virgin	25 May 1996	3	6× Platinum
550	Metallica	Load	Vertigo	15 June 1996	1	Gold
551	Bryan Adams	18 til I Die	A&M	22 June 1996	1	2× Platinum
re	Alanis Morissette	Jagged Little Pill †	Maverick	29 June 1996	1	10× Platinum
552	Crowded House	Recurring Dream	Capitol	6 July 1996	2	4× Platinum
re	Alanis Morissette	Jagged Little Pill †	Maverick	20 July 1996	8	10× Platinum
553	Suede	Coming Up	Nude	14 September 1996	1	Platinum
554	R.E.M.	New Adventures in Hi-Fi	Warner Bros.	21 September 1996	1	Platinum
555	Kula Shaker	K	Columbia	28 September 1996	2	2× Platinum
556	Peter Andre	Natural	Mushroom	12 October 1996	1	Platinum
557	Simply Red	Greatest Hits	East West	19 October 1996	2	6× Platinum
558	The Beautiful South	Blue Is the Colour	Go! Discs	2 November 1996	1	5× Platinum
559	Boyzone	A Different Beat	Polydor	9 November 1996	1	3× Platinum
560	Spice Girls	Spice	Virgin	16 November 1996	1	10× Platinum
561	Robson & Jerome	Take Two	RCA	23 November 1996	2	4× Platinum
re	Spice Girls	Spice	Virgin	7 December 1996	8	10× Platinum
1997
562	Original cast recording (Note: Evita is sometimes credited to Madonna & Various Artists.)	Evita	Warner Bros.	1 February 1997	1	2× Platinum
563	Reef	Glow	Sony S2	8 February 1997	1	Gold
564	Texas	White on Blonde	Mercury	15 February 1997	1	6× Platinum
565	Blur	Blur	Food	22 February 1997	1	Platinum
566	Mansun	Attack of the Grey Lantern	Parlophone	1 March 1997	1	Gold
re	Spice Girls	Spice	Virgin	8 March 1997	1	10× Platinum
567	U2	Pop	Island	15 March 1997	1	Platinum
re	Spice Girls	Spice	Virgin	22 March 1997	4	10× Platinum
568	The Chemical Brothers	Dig Your Own Hole	Virgin	19 April 1997	1	Platinum
569	Depeche Mode	Ultra	Mute	26 April 1997	1	Gold
570	The Charlatans	Tellin' Stories	Beggars Banquet	3 May 1997	2	Platinum
re	Spice Girls	Spice	Virgin	17 May 1997	1	10× Platinum
571	Michael Jackson	Blood on the Dance Floor: HIStory in the Mix	Epic	24 May 1997	2	Gold
572	Gary Barlow	Open Road	RCA	7 June 1997	1	Platinum
573	Wu-Tang Clan	Wu-Tang Forever	Loud	14 June 1997	1	Gold
574	Hanson	Middle of Nowhere	Mercury	21 June 1997	1	Gold
575	Radiohead	OK Computer	Parlophone	28 June 1997	2	3× Platinum
576	The Prodigy	The Fat of the Land	XL	12 July 1997	6	3× Platinum
re	Texas	White on Blonde	Mercury	23 August 1997	1	6× Platinum
577	Oasis	Be Here Now †	Creation	30 August 1997	4	6× Platinum
578	Ocean Colour Scene	Marchin' Already	MCA	27 September 1997	1	Platinum
re	Oasis	Be Here Now †	Creation	4 October 1997	1	6× Platinum
579	The Verve	Urban Hymns	Hut	11 October 1997	5	10× Platinum
580	Spice Girls	Spiceworld	Virgin	15 November 1997	2	5× Platinum
581	Celine Dion	Let's Talk About Love	Epic	29 November 1997	2	6× Platinum
re	Spice Girls	Spiceworld	Virgin	13 December 1997	1	5× Platinum
re	Celine Dion	Let's Talk About Love	Epic	20 December 1997	2	6× Platinum
1998
re	The Verve	Urban Hymns	Hut	3 January 1998	6	10× Platinum
582	James Horner	Titanic: Music from the Motion Picture	Sony Classical	14 February 1998	1	3× Platinum
re	The Verve	Urban Hymns	Hut	21 February 1998	1	10× Platinum
re	James Horner	Titanic: Music from the Motion Picture	Sony Classical	28 February 1998	2	3× Platinum
583	Madonna	Ray of Light	Maverick	14 March 1998	2	6× Platinum
re	Celine Dion	Let's Talk About Love	Epic	28 March 1998	1	6× Platinum
584	James	The Best Of	Fontana	4 April 1998	1	Platinum
585	Pulp	This Is Hardcore	Island	11 April 1998	1	Gold
586	Robbie Williams	Life thru a Lens	Chrysalis	18 April 1998	2	8× Platinum
587	Massive Attack	Mezzanine	Circa	2 May 1998	2	Platinum
588	Catatonia	International Velvet	Blanco y Negro	16 May 1998	1	3× Platinum
589	Garbage	Version 2.0	Mushroom	23 May 1998	1	2× Platinum
590	Simply Red	Blue	East West	30 May 1998	1	2× Platinum
591	Boyzone	Where We Belong	Polydor	6 June 1998	1	2× Platinum
re	Simply Red	Blue	East West	13 June 1998	1	2× Platinum
592	Embrace	The Good Will Out	Hut	20 June 1998	1	Platinum
593	The Corrs	Talk on Corners †	Atlantic	27 June 1998	1	9× Platinum
594	Five	Five	RCA	4 July 1998	1	Platinum
re	The Corrs	Talk on Corners †	Atlantic	11 July 1998	1	9× Platinum
595	Beastie Boys	Hello Nasty	Grand Royal	18 July 1998	1	Gold
596	Jane McDonald	Jane McDonald	Focus Music International	25 July 1998	3	Platinum
re	The Corrs	Talk on Corners †	Atlantic	15 August 1998	3	9× Platinum
re	Boyzone	Where We Belong	Polydor	5 September 1998	2	2× Platinum
re	The Corrs	Talk on Corners †	Atlantic	19 September 1998	1	9× Platinum
597	Manic Street Preachers	This Is My Truth Tell Me Yours	Epic	26 September 1998	3	3× Platinum
598	Phil Collins	Hits	Virgin	17 October 1998	1	6× Platinum
599	The Beautiful South	Quench	Go! Discs	24 October 1998	2	3× Platinum
600	Robbie Williams	I've Been Expecting You	Chrysalis	7 November 1998	1	10× Platinum
601	U2	The Best of 1980–1990 & B-Sides	Island	14 November 1998	1	5× Platinum
602	George Michael	Ladies & Gentlemen: The Best of George Michael	Epic	21 November 1998	8	8× Platinum
1999
re	Robbie Williams	I've Been Expecting You	Chrysalis	16 January 1999	1	10× Platinum
603	Fatboy Slim	You've Come a Long Way, Baby	Skint	23 January 1999	4	3× Platinum
re	Robbie Williams	I've Been Expecting You	Chrysalis	20 February 1999	1	10× Platinum
re	The Corrs	Talk on Corners	Atlantic	27 February 1999	3	9× Platinum
604	Stereophonics	Performance and Cocktails	V2	20 March 1999	1	3× Platinum
605	Blur	13	Food	27 March 1999	2	Platinum
re	The Corrs	Talk on Corners	Atlantic	10 April 1999	1	9× Platinum
re	ABBA	Gold: Greatest Hits	Polydor	17 April 1999	1	18× Platinum
606	Catatonia	Equally Cursed and Blessed	Blanco y Negro	24 April 1999	1	Platinum
re	ABBA	Gold: Greatest Hits	Polydor	1 May 1999	2	18× Platinum
607	Suede	Head Music	Nude	15 May 1999	1	Gold
608	Texas	The Hush	Mercury	22 May 1999	1	2× Platinum
re	ABBA	Gold: Greatest Hits	Polydor	29 May 1999	2	18× Platinum
609	Boyzone	By Request	Polydor	12 June 1999	2	6× Platinum
610	Jamiroquai	Synkronized	S2	26 June 1999	1	Platinum
611	The Chemical Brothers	Surrender	Virgin	3 July 1999	1	Platinum
re	Boyzone	By Request	Polydor	10 July 1999	7	6× Platinum
612	Travis	The Man Who	Independiente	28 August 1999	2	9× Platinum
613	Shania Twain	Come On Over †	Mercury	11 September 1999	3	11× Platinum
614	Leftfield	Rhythm and Stealth	Hard Hands	2 October 1999	1	Gold
615	Tom Jones	Reload	Gut	9 October 1999	1	Platinum
re	Shania Twain	Come On Over †	Mercury	16 October 1999	3	11× Platinum
616	Steps	Steptacular	EBUL	6 November 1999	3	3× Platinum
617	Celine Dion	All the Way... A Decade of Song	Epic	27 November 1999	1	2× Platinum
re	Steps	Steptacular	EBUL	4 December 1999	1	3× Platinum
re	Shania Twain	Come On Over †	Mercury	11 December 1999	5	11× Platinum

=== By artist ===
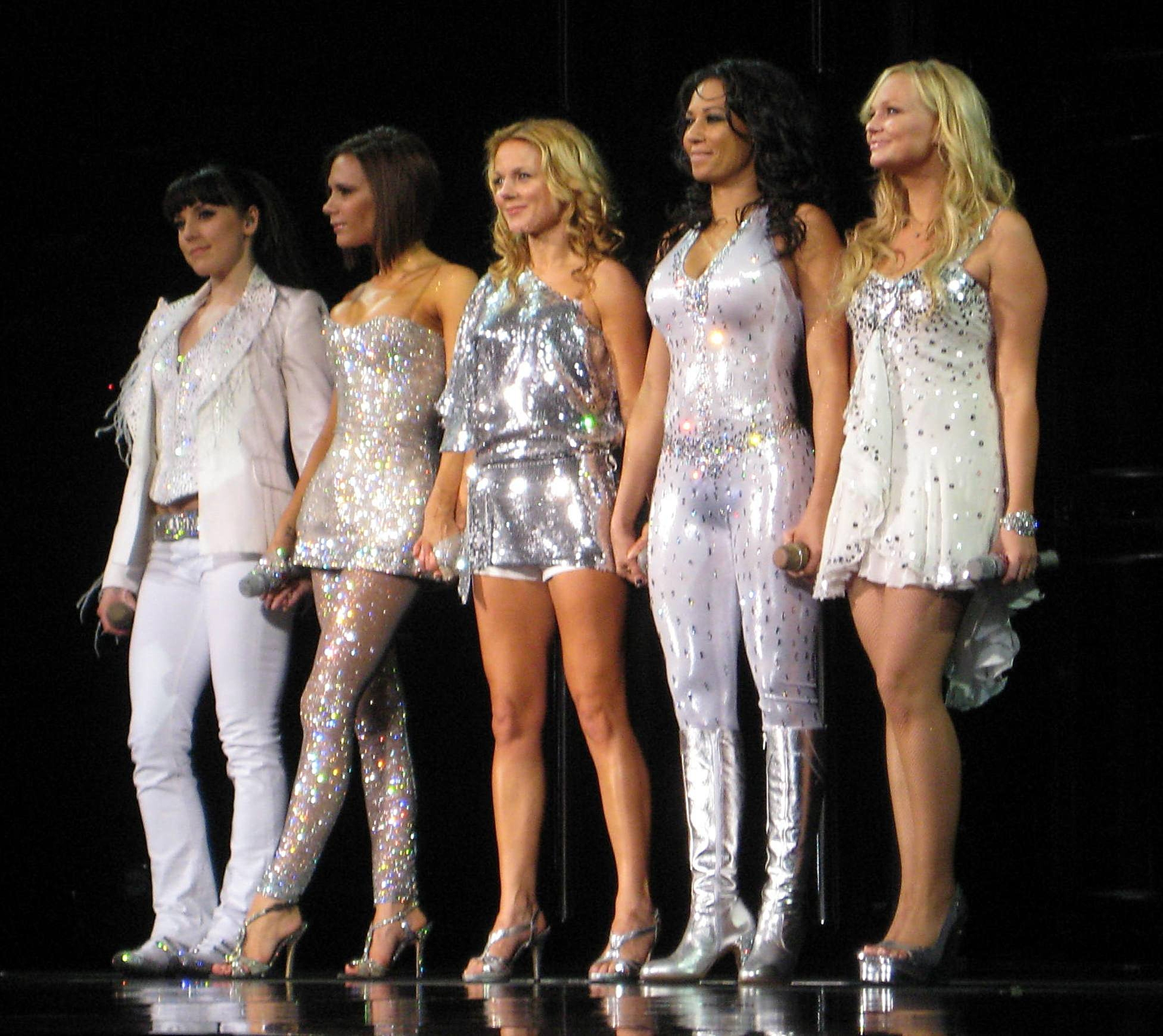
The Spice Girls' debut, Spice, spent a total of 15 weeks at number one on the UK Albums Chart during the 1990s, longer than any other album.

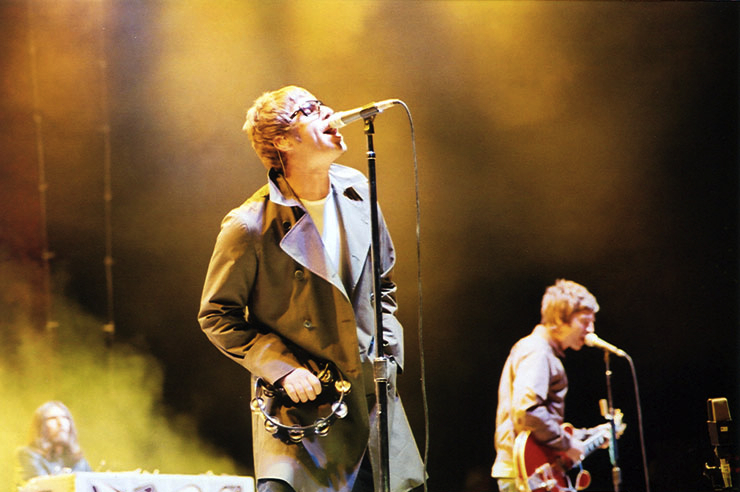
(What's the Story) Morning Glory? by Oasis was the biggest-selling album of the decade.

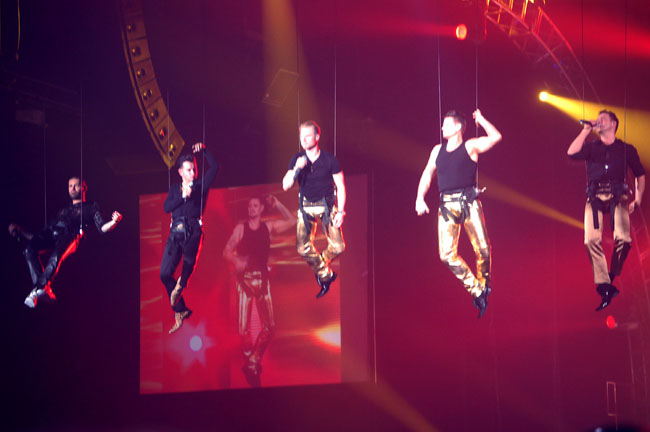
Irish group Boyzone topped the albums chart with four different releases this decade.

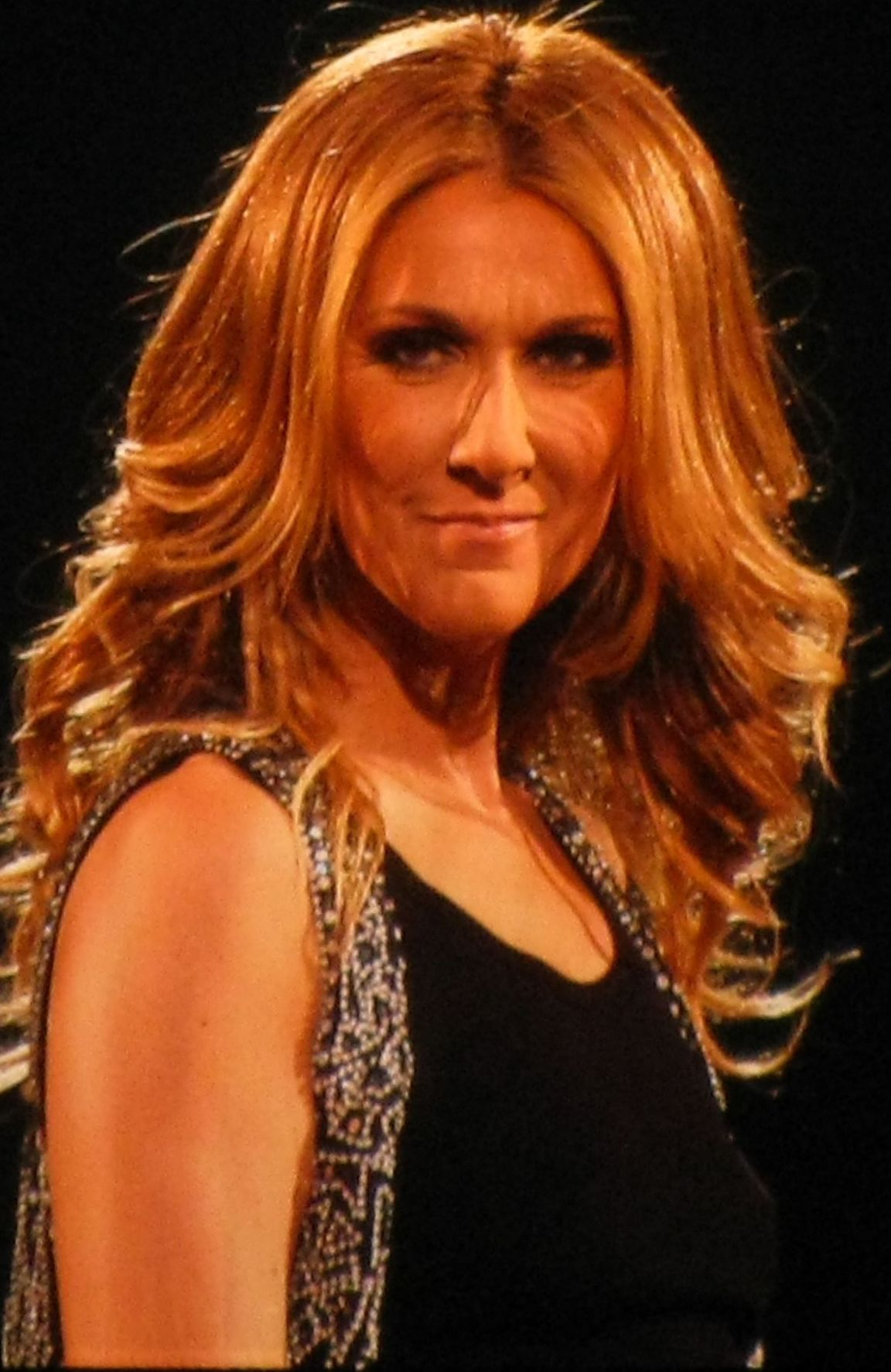
Canadian singer Celine Dion achieved four number-one albums during the 1990s.

Eight artists spent 12 weeks or more at number one on the album chart during the 1990s.

Artist	Number ones	Weeks at number one	Albums
Simply Red	4	19	• Stars (1991–92, twelve weeks at number one) • Life (1995, three weeks) • Greatest Hits (1996, two weeks) • Blue (1998, two weeks)
Spice Girls	2	18	• Spice (1996–97, fifteen weeks at number one) • Spiceworld (1997, three weeks)
Oasis	3	16	• Definitely Maybe (1994, one week at number one) • (What's the Story) Morning Glory? (1995–96, ten weeks) • Be Here Now (1997, five weeks)
Boyzone	4	14	• Said and Done (1995, one week at number one) • A Different Beat (1996, one week) • Where We Belong (1998, three weeks) • By Request (1997, nine weeks)
Celine Dion	4	14	• The Colour of My Love (1995, seven weeks at number one) • Falling into You (1996, one week) • Let's Talk About Love (1997–8, five weeks) • All the Way... A Decade of Song (1999, one week)
Cher	2	13	• Love Hurts (1991, six weeks at number one) • Greatest Hits: 1965–1992 (1992–93, seven weeks)
Luciano Pavarotti (Note: The totals for Luciano Pavarotti include two albums co-credited with Plácido Domingo and José Carreras.)	4	12	• The Essential Pavarotti (1990, four weeks at number one) • In Concert (1990, five weeks) • Essential Pavarotti II (1991, two weeks) • The Three Tenors in Concert 1994 (1994, one week)
George Michael	3	12	• Listen Without Prejudice Vol. 1 (1990, one week at number one) • Older (1996, three weeks) • Ladies & Gentlemen: The Best of George Michael (1998–99, eight weeks)

=== By record label ===
Six record labels spent 20 weeks or more at number one on the album chart during the 1990s.

Record label	Number-one albums	Weeks at number one
Virgin Records	19	62
RCA Records	10	32
Epic Records	10	30
Polydor Records	8	24
Mercury Records	7	24
East West Records	6	21

== Christmas number ones ==
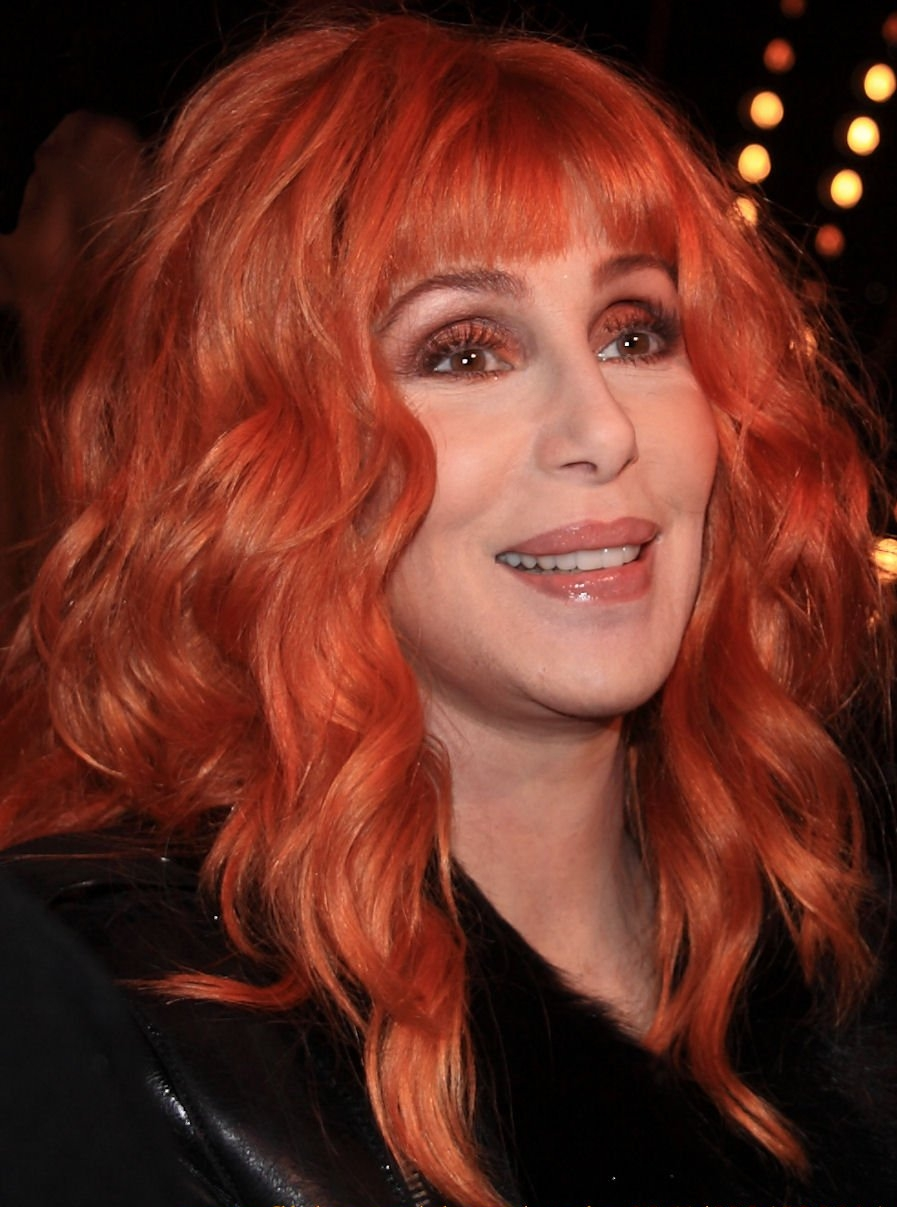
Cher's greatest hits album 1965–1992 was the 1992 Christmas number-one album.

In the UK, Christmas number one albums are those that are at the top of the UK Albums Chart on Christmas Day. Typically, this will refer to the album that was announced as number one on the Sunday before 25 December—when Christmas Day falls on a Sunday itself, the official number one is considered by the OCC to be the one announced on that day's chart. During the 1990s, the following albums were Christmas number ones.

Year	Artist	Album	Record label	Weeks at number one	Ref.
1990	Madonna	The Immaculate Collection	Sire	9	
1991	Queen	Greatest Hits II	Parlophone	5	
1992	Cher	Greatest Hits: 1965–1992	Geffen	7	
1993	Meat Loaf	Bat Out of Hell II: Back into Hell	Virgin	11	
1994	The Beautiful South	Carry On up the Charts	Go! Discs	7	
1995	Robson & Jerome	Robson & Jerome	RCA	7	
1996	Spice Girls	Spice	Virgin	15	
1997	Celine Dion	Let's Talk About Love	Epic	5	
1998	George Michael	Ladies & Gentlemen: The Best of George Michael	Epic	8	
1999	Shania Twain	Come On Over	Mercury	11	
