= List of UK top-ten albums in 1992 =

The UK Albums Chart is one of many music charts compiled by the Official Charts Company that calculates the best-selling albums of the week in the United Kingdom. Before 2004, the chart was only based on the sales of physical albums. This list shows albums that peaked in the Top 10 of the UK Albums Chart during 1992, as well as albums which peaked in 1991 and 1993 but were in the top 10 in 1992. The entry date is when the album appeared in the top ten for the first time (week ending, as published by the Official Charts Company, which is six days after the chart is announced).

The first new number-one album of the year was High on the Happy Side by Wet Wet Wet. Overall, twenty-five different albums peaked at number-one in 1992, with twenty-five unique artists hitting that position.

== Top-ten albums ==
Key

Symbol	Meaning
‡	Album peaked in 1991 but still in chart in 1992.
♦	Album released in 1992 but peaked in 1993.
Entered	The date that the album first appeared in the chart.
Peak	Highest position that the album reached in the UK Albums Chart.

Entered (week ending)	Weeks in top 10	Single	Artist	Peak	Peak reached (week ending)	Weeks at peak
Albums in 1991
18 May 1991	11	Time, Love & Tenderness ‡	Michael Bolton	2	18 May 1991	2
1 June 1991	14	Beverley Craven ‡	Beverley Craven	3	1 June 1991	1
14 September 1991	15	From Time to Time – The Singles Collection ‡	Paul Young	1	14 September 1991	1
12 October 1991	51	Stars ‡	Simply Red	1	12 October 1991	12
12 October 1991	10	Diamonds and Pearls ‡	Prince and The New Power Generation	2	12 October 1991	1
12 October 1991	22	Simply the Best ‡	Tina Turner	2	19 October 1991	3
26 October 1991	8	The Commitments (Original Motion Picture Soundtrack) ‡	The Commitments	4	9 November 1991	1
26 October 1991	8	Emotions	Mariah Carey	4	15 February 1992	1
9 November 1991	18	Greatest Hits II ‡	Queen	1	9 November 1991	5
16 November 1991	7	Shepherd Moons	Enya	1	16 November 1991	1
23 November 1991	21	We Can't Dance ‡	Genesis	1	23 November 1991	2
23 November 1991	19	Real Love	Lisa Stansfield	3	18 January 1992	3
30 November 1991	24	Dangerous ‡	Michael Jackson	1	30 November 1991	1
30 November 1991	5	Achtung Baby ‡	U2	2	30 November 1991	1
7 December 1991	9	Greatest Hits	Queen	6	18 January 1992	1
14 December 1991	8	Michael Crawford Performs Andrew Lloyd Webber ‡	Michael Crawford and the Royal Philharmonic Orchestra	3	21 December 1991	2
21 December 1991	3	The Definitive Simon and Garfunkel ‡	Simon and Garfunkel	8	21 December 1991	2
Albums in 1992
18 January 1992	6	Nevermind	Nirvana	7	1 February 1992	2
25 January 1992	2	Magic and Loss	Lou Reed	6	25 January 1992	1
1 February 1992	3	No Regrets – The Best of Scott Walker and The Walker Brothers 1965–1976	Scott Walker and The Walker Brothers	4	8 February 1992	1
8 February 1992	9	High on the Happy Side	Wet Wet Wet	1	8 February 1992	2
8 February 1992	1	Spooky	Lush	7	8 February 1992	1
8 February 1992	1	Finally	CeCe Peniston	10	8 February 1992	1
22 February 1992	4	From the Heart – His Greatest Love Songs	Elvis Presley	4	22 February 1992	1
29 February 1992	3	Seven	James	2	29 February 1992	1
29 February 1992	8	Hormonally Yours	Shakespears Sister	3	29 February 1992	2
29 February 1992	2	Curtis Stigers	Curtis Stigers	7	29 February 1992	1
7 March 1992	12	Divine Madness	Madness	1	14 March 1992	3
7 March 1992	1	Yours Sincerely	The Pasadenas	6	14 March 1992	1
14 March 1992	8	Tears Roll Down (Greatest Hits 82–92)	Tears for Fears	2	14 March 1992	3
14 March 1992	3	Woodface	Crowded House	6	28 March 1992	1
21 March 1992	2	After Hours	Gary Moore	4	21 March 1992	1
21 March 1992	1	Going Blank Again	Ride	5	21 March 1992	1
21 March 1992	3	The Very Best of Frankie Valli and The Four Seasons	Frankie Valli and The Four Seasons	7	21 March 1992	1
28 March 1992	12	Up	Right Said Fred	1	25 April 1992	1
4 April 1992	3	Human Touch	Bruce Springsteen	1	4 April 1992	1
4 April 1992	2	Lucky Town	Bruce Springsteen	2	4 April 1992	1
11 April 1992	4	Adrenalize	Def Leppard	1	11 April 1992	1
11 April 1992	2	0898 Beautiful South	The Beautiful South	4	11 April 1992	1
11 April 1992	3	Hear My Song – The Very Best of Josef Locke	Josef Locke	7	18 April 1992	1
18 April 1992	24	Diva	Annie Lennox	1	18 April 1992	2
25 April 1992	3	Volume III (Just Right)	Soul II Soul	3	25 April 1992	1
25 April 1992	5	Greatest Hits	ZZ Top	5	2 May 1992	2
25 April 1992	1	Motown's Greatest Hits	The Temptations	8	25 April 1992	1
2 May 1992	2	Wish	The Cure	1	2 May 1992	1
9 May 1992	2	Power of Ten	Chris de Burgh	3	9 May 1992	1
9 May 1992	1	Some Girls Wander by Mistake	The Sisters of Mercy	5	9 May 1992	1
16 May 1992	2	1992 – The Love Album	Carter the Unstoppable Sex Machine	1	16 May 1992	1
23 May 1992	2	Fear of the Dark	Iron Maiden	1	23 May 1992	1
23 May 1992	2	The Southern Harmony and Musical Companion	The Black Crowes	2	23 May 1992	1
23 May 1992	3	Greatest Hits	Squeeze	6	23 May 1992	1
23 May 1992	1	Revenge	Kiss	10	23 May 1992	1
30 May 1992	3	Michael Ball	Michael Ball	1	30 May 1992	1
30 May 1992	8	This Thing Called Love: The Greatest Hits of Alexander O'Neal	Alexander O'Neal	4	30 May 1992	3
6 June 1992	24	Back to Front	Lionel Richie	1	6 June 1992	6
6 June 1992	4	Live at Wembley '86	Queen	2	6 June 1992	1
13 June 1992	2	Change Everything	Del Amitri	2	13 June 1992	1
13 June 1992	5	Completely Hooked – The Best of Dr. Hook	Dr. Hook	3	20 June 1992	2
13 June 1992	1	Shadows and Light	Wilson Phillips	6	13 June 1992	1
13 June 1992	4	Rush Street	Richard Marx	7	13 June 1992	1
13 June 1992	1	As Ugly as They Wanna Be (EP)	Ugly Kid Joe	9	13 June 1992	1
20 June 1992	2	Angel Dust	Faith No More	2	20 June 1992	1
27 June 1992	5	The One	Elton John	2	27 June 1992	3
27 June 1992	7	The Legend – The Essential Collection	Joe Cocker	4	27 June 1992	3
27 June 1992	1	Sgt. Pepper's Lonely Hearts Club Band	The Beatles	6	27 June 1992	1
27 June 1992	2	The Complete Tom Jones	Tom Jones	8	4 July 1992	1
4 July 1992	11	The Greatest Hits: 1966–1992	Neil Diamond	1	25 July 1992	3
11 July 1992	4	A Life of Surprises: The Best of Prefab Sprout	Prefab Sprout	3	11 July 1992	1
11 July 1992	1	Good Stuff	The B-52's	8	11 July 1992	1
18 July 1992	2	U.F.Orb	The Orb	1	18 July 1992	1
18 July 1992	4	MTV Unplugged (EP)	Mariah Carey	3	18 July 1992	1
18 July 1992	1	Countdown to Extinction	Megadeth	5	18 July 1992	1
1 August 1992	1	Dirty	Sonic Youth	6	1 August 1992	1
8 August 1992	4	Growing Up in Public	Jimmy Nail	2	8 August 1992	1
8 August 1992	1	Your Arsenal	Morrissey	4	8 August 1992	1
15 August 1992	3	Welcome to Wherever You Are	INXS	1	15 August 1992	1
15 August 1992	1	The Definitive Jim Reeves 1923-1964	Jim Reeves	9	15 August 1992	1
29 August 1992	4	Best... I	The Smiths	1	29 August 1992	1
29 August 1992	2	Some Gave All	Billy Ray Cyrus	9	29 August 1992	2
5 September 1992	4	Greatest Hits	Kylie Minogue	1	5 September 1992	1
5 September 1992	1	Laughing on Judgement Day	Thunder	2	5 September 1992	1
5 September 1992	13	Take That and Party ♦	Take That	2	16 January 1993	1
12 September 1992	8	Tubular Bells II	Mike Oldfield	1	12 September 1992	2
12 September 1992	3	Tourism: Songs from Studios, Stages, Hotelrooms & Other Strange Places	Roxette	2	12 September 1992	1
12 September 1992	13	Unplugged ♦	Eric Clapton	2	20 March 1993	1
12 September 1992	1	Paul Weller	Paul Weller	8	12 September 1992	1
19 September 1992	8	The Best of Belinda, Volume 1	Belinda Carlisle	1	26 September 1992	1
19 September 1992	1	Amused to Death	Roger Waters	8	19 September 1992	1
19 September 1992	1	Copper Blue	Sugar	10	19 September 1992	1
26 September 1992	2	III Sides to Every Story	Extreme	2	26 September 1992	1
26 September 1992	9	Boss Drum	The Shamen	3	26 September 1992	2
26 September 1992	2	Am I Not Your Girl?	Sinéad O'Connor	6	3 October 1992	1
3 October 1992	18	ABBA Gold: Greatest Hits	ABBA	1	3 October 1992	1
3 October 1992	1	Songs of Freedom	Bob Marley	10	3 October 1992	1
10 October 1992	46	Automatic for the People	R.E.M.	1	10 October 1992	4
10 October 1992	3	Us	Peter Gabriel	2	10 October 1992	1
10 October 1992	13	Timeless: The Classics	Michael Bolton	3	31 October 1992	6
10 October 1992	1	Back to the Light	Brian May	6	10 October 1992	1
10 October 1992	1	Greatest Hits	The Police	10	10 October 1992	1
17 October 1992	3	Love Symbol	Prince and The New Power Generation	1	17 October 1992	1
17 October 1992	1	Kiss This	Sex Pistols	10	17 October 1992	1
24 October 1992	13	Glittering Prize 81/92	Simple Minds	1	24 October 1992	3
24 October 1992	5	Erotica	Madonna	2	24 October 1992	3
24 October 1992	2	Once in a Lifetime/Sand in the Vaseline	Talking Heads	7	24 October 1992	2
31 October 1992	1	Great Expectations	Tasmin Archer	8	31 October 1992	1
7 November 1992	1	AC/DC Live	AC/DC	5	7 November 1992	1
7 November 1992	1	Cooleyhighharmony	Boyz II Men	7	7 November 1992	1
7 November 1992	1	Love Deluxe	Sade	10	7 November 1992	1
14 November 1992	6	Keep the Faith	Bon Jovi	1	14 November 1992	1
14 November 1992	2	God's Great Banana Skin	Chris Rea	4	14 November 1992	1
14 November 1992	11	Greatest Hits	Gloria Estefan	2	26 December 1992	2
14 November 1992	1	Harvest Moon	Neil Young	9	14 November 1992	1
21 November 1992	11	Greatest Hits: 1965–1992	Cher	1	21 November 1992	7
28 November 1992	8	Pop! The First 20 Hits	Erasure	1	28 November 1992	2
28 November 1992	10	Live – The Way We Walk, Volume One: The Shorts	Genesis	3	28 November 1992	3
28 November 1992	6	The Freddie Mercury Album	Freddie Mercury	4	28 November 1992	1
28 November 1992	2	The Celts	Enya	10	28 November 1992	2

== See also ==
- 1992 in British music
- List of number-one albums from the 1990s (UK)
