= 1990 in British music =

This is a summary of 1990 in music in the United Kingdom, including the official charts from that year.

== Summary ==
The first year of the 1990s saw a total of 17 singles top the chart. The first, "Hangin' Tough" by the boyband New Kids on the Block, which became the group's second chart-topper, set the record for lowest first-week sales for a number 1, with only 28,000 copies sold. Although January is usually a low sales month due to it being post-Christmas season, the vinyl single had been in severe decline in the UK since the late 1980s. In 1990 New Kids on the Block released a total of three albums and six singles (not including "Hangin' Tough") during the course of the year. Although their third album Step by Step topped the charts, their follow-up debut eponymous album was re-released and made only number six. The six singles released after their chart-topper in January all failed to top the charts, though four did make the top 5, the most successful, "Step By Step", reaching number two.

The next No. 1 was Kylie Minogue's cover of the Little Anthony & the Imperials song "Tears on My Pillow", taken from the film The Delinquents, which became her fourth number one single in the UK and the final number one for production team Stock Aitken Waterman. Her album release for the year Rhythm of Love made number 9 on the UK Albums Chart with the lead single "Better the Devil You Know" making number two.

Despite the huge success experienced by Stock Aitken Waterman the previous four years, 1990 saw a sharp decline in the popularity of their songs. With Jason Donovan's chart positions rapidly declining, both Sonia and Big Fun were dropped, Donna Summer reportedly fell-out with the trio and only Lonnie Gordon was able to go Top 10 with her number 4 single "Happenin' All Over Again", a song originally intended for Donna Summer. Kylie Minogue ended her run of Top 2's when "Step Back in Time" stalled at number 4, and new songs by Hazell Dean, Pat and Mick and Sybil missed the chart completely. Mike Stock revealed in his book "The Hit Factory" he felt it was Pete Waterman's fault their popularity plummeted after the outspoken Producer made several scathing attacks about the British Music Industry to the press. By the end of the year, rumours began circulating about unrest in the PWL camp and, next year, Matt Aitken would be the first to depart.

The continued success of Kylie, and the Australian soap opera's Neighbours on BBC 1 and Home and Away on ITV, saw more actors releasing singles this year in the hope of replicating the success of Kylie and Jason Donovan. The most successful of these was Craig McLachlan (who notably appeared in both series) and his band Check 1–2 who scored a number 2 in the spring with "Mona" and went Top 20 with its follow-up, "Amanda".

Madonna scored her 7th number 1 single with "Vogue", from her hit album I'm Breathless which made No. 2, charting in the same position as her follow-up single "Hanky Panky". Her album success did not end there, however, with The Immaculate Collection (greatest hits release) becoming her most successful album ever, topping the UK albums chart for 9 weeks and selling 3.6 million copies in the UK (10th best selling album of all-time) and promotional single "Justify My Love" giving her a second No. 2 hit, whose video caused some controversy and was banned from MTV.

Showing something of a revival in popularity this year were Belinda Carlisle who followed three tracks that barely made the top 40 with a remix of a track from her 1989 album Runaway Horses, "(We Want) The Same Thing", which made number six. The album was subsequently re-released, peaking at the same position it had before, number four, and "Summer Rain" became the sixth and final hit from the album, making number 23 in December. Another comeback was from Elton John who got his first solo number 1 in June, and only his second overall (his first being "Don't Go Breaking My Heart" with Kiki Dee in 1976) with the charity single "Sacrifice"/"Healing Hands", with all the proceeds going to AIDS charities. Both tracks had previously failed to reach the top 40 when they were originally released in 1989, but significant airplay on Radio 2 ensured the songs were re-issued and became massive hits. He also enjoyed success with two number 1 albums, Sleeping With the Past in July, and The Very Best of Elton John in November. The latter went on to sell 2.7 million copies in the UK, becoming the 17th-best-selling album of all-time.

An obscure British house-dance act DNA revived Suzanne Vega's fortunes this year with a smash hit remix of 1987 album track "Tom's Diner" which peaked at number two in July. The track was an international hit, peaking in the top 10 all over the world. European dance music was one of the most popular genres of the year, with several songs of that type hitting number 1, including, from Germany, Snap!'s "The Power", the last record to jump from outside the top 10 to number 1 until 2006, discounting imports. Although their album, World Power, made only number 21 upon initial release, Snap went on to have a further three top 10 singles, "Ooops Up" (No.5, June), "Cult of Snap" (No.8, October) and "Mary Had a Little Boy" (No.8, December) and this caused the album to re-chart and peak at number 10.

Belgian house music was very popular in 1990 with artists like Technotronic powering the charts with songs like No.2 smash "Get Up ! (Before the Night Is Over)" and "Rockin' Over the Beat", a big summer No.9 hit, and finally a "Megamix" rounded off the year, making number 6 in October. From Italy, 49ers scored two of the biggest dance hits of the year; "Touch Me" peaked at number 3, and the follow-up, "Don't You Love Me", which contained a sample from Jody Watley's song "Don't You Want Me", made number 12. Meanwhile, Dutch trio Twenty 4 Seven hit the Top 20 twice with their two hits, "I Can't Stand It" (No.7) and "Are You Dreaming" (No.17); both tracks were fronted by US rapper, Captain Hollywood.

Manchester in the UK was the base of 808 State who scored two Top 10 hits this year, one with fellow Mancunian rapper MC Tunes, "The Only Rhyme That Bites", and one on their own, "Cubik/Olympic", both tracks reached No.10. Londonbeat hit the charts in the summer of 1990 with "I've Been Thinking About You" and The Adventures Of Stevie V released the summer anthem of 1990 "Dirty Cash" which reached No.2 in July. The KLF, who were formerly in the charts as The Timelords back in 1988, had a huge club and chart comeback with "What Time is Love?" which made No.5 in September. This started a successful run of hits that continued through to 1992.

A problem occurred in September when two records – Steve Miller Band's "The Joker" and Deee-Lite's "Groove Is in the Heart" – both tied for the number one position, selling exactly the same number of copies. As the rules stated that in the event of this happening, the single which had climbed the highest would be the number 1, "The Joker", re-issued after being featured in a Levi's advert, won out (having climbed five places instead of three). Due to the controversy that followed, with some saying that it was unfair to let a re-issue of an old song overtake the debut single of a new group, the rules were changed so that records would now be allowed to tie.

Four of the number ones this year came from films. Kylie Minogue's "Tears on My Pillow", mentioned earlier, Partners In Kryme's "Turtle Power", from Teenage Mutant Ninja Turtles, Maria McKee's "Show Me Heaven", from Days of Thunder, and a re-issue of The Righteous Brothers' "Unchained Melody" (originally a number 14 hit in 1965) from Ghost, which was the biggest selling single of the year. A re-issue of the 1965 No. 1 "You've Lost That Lovin' Feelin'" in December was also successful, peaking at #3.

Cliff Richard scored the Christmas number one single with "Saviour's Day", his 13th number one, and his 100th top 40 hit. With this he became the only person to have a number one in the 1950s, 60s, 70s, 80s, and 90s.

Merseyside composer John McCabe produced a flute concerto, written for James Galway and premièred by the London Symphony Orchestra who had commissioned it; it was not recorded until 1999. Another Lancashire composer, John Pickard, produced his best-known work The Flight of Icarus. Simon Rattle became musical director of the City of Birmingham Symphony Orchestra, of which he had been Principal Conductor since 1980.

== Events ==
- 18 February – Fine Young Cannibals win two Brit awards, but they soon return them in protest after a video message from Prime Minister Margaret Thatcher appears at the ceremony.
- 3 April – Jupiter Landing, a music theatre piece by Peter Maxwell Davies, is performed for the first time at the Queen Elizabeth Hall in London.
- 12 April – The Stone Roses are fined £6,000 for causing damage and vandalism to the offices of their former label, FM Revolver, after the band took offence to a video their former label made for the re-release of their "Sally Cinnamon" single
- 18 May – Clarissa, an opera by Robin Holloway, is performed for the first time at the London Coliseum.
- 27 May – The Stone Roses play an outdoor concert at Spike Island in Widnes, Cheshire.
- 7 June – The first complete performance of Gerald Finzi’s Requiem da camera, composed in the mid 1920s, takes place at the Spitalfields Festival with the City of London Sinfonia, BBC Northern Singers, soloist Stephen Varcoe and conductor Richard Hickox.
- 1 August – UB40 are deported from Seychelles after being arrested on suspicion of marijuana possession.
- 2 August – Three world premieres are given at a concert commemorating the Queen Mother's 90th birthday in Buckingham Palace: The Thistle and the Rose, a song cycle by Patrick Doyle; Suite for Violin by Patrick Gowers; and the Romanza for Cello and Orchestra by David Matthews.
- 24 August – Thrinos for cello by John Taverner is performed for the first time in Edinburgh.
- 5 October – Rainbow for orchestra by Thea Musgrave is performed for the first time, in Royal Concert Hall, Glasgow.
- 9 October – Radio stations worldwide play "Imagine" by John Lennon, honouring him on what would have been his 50th birthday.
- 3 December – Ibbs and Tillett goes into voluntary liquidation.

== Charts ==
=== Number-one singles ===
Chart date (week ending)	Song	Artist(s)	Sales
6 January	"Do They Know It's Christmas?"	Band Aid II	38,709
13 January	"Hangin' Tough"	New Kids on the Block	28,067
20 January	"Hangin' Tough"	New Kids on the Block	50,320
27 January	"Tears on My Pillow"	Kylie Minogue	59,262
3 February	"Nothing Compares 2 U"	Sinéad O'Connor	81,192
10 February	"Nothing Compares 2 U"	Sinéad O'Connor	114,155
17 February	"Nothing Compares 2 U"	Sinéad O'Connor	108,375
24 February	"Nothing Compares 2 U"	Sinéad O'Connor	107,083
3 March	"Dub Be Good to Me"	Beats International	72,029
10 March	"Dub Be Good to Me"	Beats International	84,133
17 March	"Dub Be Good to Me"	Beats International	62,968
24 March	"Dub Be Good to Me"	Beats International	44,982
31 March	"The Power"	Snap!	53,380
7 April	"The Power"	Snap!	80,053
14 April	"Vogue"	Madonna	67,643
21 April	"Vogue"	Madonna	75,225
28 April	"Vogue"	Madonna	60,605
5 May	"Vogue"	Madonna	51,680
12 May	"Killer"	Adamski featuring Seal	51,782
19 May	"Killer"	Adamski featuring Seal	82,297
26 May	"Killer"	Adamski featuring Seal	73,882
2 June	"Killer"	Adamski featuring Seal	60,860
9 June	"World in Motion"	New Order	67,371
16 June	"World in Motion"	New Order	77,149
23 June	"Sacrifice" / "Healing Hands"	Elton John	74,205
30 June	"Sacrifice" / "Healing Hands"	Elton John	107,899
7 July	"Sacrifice" / "Healing Hands"	Elton John	111,129
14 July	"Sacrifice" / "Healing Hands"	Elton John	93,908
21 July	"Sacrifice" / "Healing Hands"	Elton John	60,945
28 July	"Turtle Power"	Partners in Kryme	59,211
4 August	"Turtle Power"	Partners in Kryme	76,636
11 August	"Turtle Power"	Partners in Kryme	51,918
18 August	"Turtle Power"	Partners in Kryme	46,852
25 August	"Itsy Bitsy Teeny Weeny Yellow Polka Dot Bikini"	Timmy Mallett with Bombalurina	52,190
1 September	"Itsy Bitsy Teeny Weeny Yellow Polka Dot Bikini"	Timmy Mallett with Bombalurina	67,439
8 September	"Itsy Bitsy Teeny Weeny Yellow Polka Dot Bikini"	Timmy Mallett with Bombalurina	54,825
15 September	"The Joker"	Steve Miller Band	44,118
22 September	"The Joker"	Steve Miller Band	60,911
29 September	"Show Me Heaven"	Maria McKee	44,455
6 October	"Show Me Heaven"	Maria McKee	75,463
13 October	"Show Me Heaven"	Maria McKee	74,480
20 October	"Show Me Heaven"	Maria McKee	65,807
27 October	"A Little Time"	The Beautiful South	60,996
3 November	"Unchained Melody"	The Righteous Brothers	167,331
10 November	"Unchained Melody"	The Righteous Brothers	175,933
17 November	"Unchained Melody"	The Righteous Brothers	127,330
24 November	"Unchained Melody"	The Righteous Brothers	98,430
1 December	"Ice Ice Baby"	Vanilla Ice	100,759
8 December	"Ice Ice Baby"	Vanilla Ice	113,560
15 December	"Ice Ice Baby"	Vanilla Ice	89,845
22 December	"Ice Ice Baby"	Vanilla Ice	89,539
29 December	"Saviour's Day"	Cliff Richard	100,946

=== Number-one albums ===
Chart date (week ending)	Album	Artist
6 January	...But Seriously	Phil Collins
13 January	...But Seriously	Phil Collins
20 January	...But Seriously	Phil Collins
27 January	Colour	The Christians
3 February	...But Seriously	Phil Collins
10 February	...But Seriously	Phil Collins
17 February	...But Seriously	Phil Collins
24 February	...But Seriously	Phil Collins
3 March	...But Seriously	Phil Collins
10 March	...But Seriously	Phil Collins
17 March	...But Seriously	Phil Collins
24 March	I Do Not Want What I Haven't Got	Sinéad O'Connor
31 March	Changesbowie	David Bowie
7 April	Only Yesterday: Their Greatest Hits	The Carpenters
14 April	Only Yesterday: Their Greatest Hits	The Carpenters
21 April	Behind the Mask	Fleetwood Mac
28 April	Only Yesterday: Their Greatest Hits	The Carpenters
5 May	Only Yesterday: Their Greatest Hits	The Carpenters
12 May	Only Yesterday: Their Greatest Hits	The Carpenters
19 May	Only Yesterday: Their Greatest Hits	The Carpenters
26 May	Only Yesterday: Their Greatest Hits	The Carpenters
2 June	Vol. II: 1990 – A New Decade	Soul II Soul
9 June	Vol. II: 1990 – A New Decade	Soul II Soul
16 June	Vol. II: 1990 – A New Decade	Soul II Soul
23 June	The Essential Pavarotti	Luciano Pavarotti
30 June	Step by Step	New Kids on the Block
7 July	The Essential Pavarotti	Luciano Pavarotti
14 July	The Essential Pavarotti	Luciano Pavarotti
21 July	The Essential Pavarotti	Luciano Pavarotti
28 July	Sleeping with the Past	Elton John
4 August	Sleeping with the Past	Elton John
11 August	Sleeping with the Past	Elton John
18 August	Sleeping with the Past	Elton John
25 August	Sleeping with the Past	Elton John
1 September	Graffiti Bridge	Prince
8 September	In Concert	Carreras, Domingo, Pavarotti (The Three Tenors); Orchestra Del Maggio Musical Fiorentino; Orchestra Del Teatro Dell'Opera Di Roma Zubin Mehta
15 September	Listen Without Prejudice Vol. 1	George Michael
22 September	In Concert	Carreras, Domingo, Pavarotti (The Three Tenors); Orchestra Del Maggio Musical Fiorentino; Orchestra Del Teatro Dell'Opera Di Roma Zubin Mehta
29 September	In Concert	Carreras, Domingo, Pavarotti (The Three Tenors); Orchestra Del Maggio Musical Fiorentino; Orchestra Del Teatro Dell'Opera Di Roma Zubin Mehta
6 October	In Concert	Carreras, Domingo, Pavarotti (The Three Tenors); Orchestra Del Maggio Musical Fiorentino; Orchestra Del Teatro Dell'Opera Di Roma Zubin Mehta
13 October	In Concert	Carreras, Domingo, Pavarotti (The Three Tenors); Orchestra Del Maggio Musical Fiorentino; Orchestra Del Teatro Dell'Opera Di Roma Zubin Mehta
20 October	Some Friendly	The Charlatans
27 October	The Rhythm of the Saints	Paul Simon
3 November	The Rhythm of the Saints	Paul Simon
10 November	The Very Best of Elton John	Elton John
17 November	The Very Best of Elton John	Elton John
24 November	The Immaculate Collection	Madonna
1 December	The Immaculate Collection	Madonna
8 December	The Immaculate Collection	Madonna
15 December	The Immaculate Collection	Madonna
22 December	The Immaculate Collection	Madonna
29 December	The Immaculate Collection	Madonna

=== Number-one compilation albums ===
Chart date (week ending)	Album
6 January	Now 16
13 January	Now 16
5 May	Now 17
4 August	Now Dance 902
1 December	Now 18

== Year end charts ==
=== Best-selling singles of 1990 ===
No.	Title	Artist	Peak position
1	"Unchained Melody"	The Righteous Brothers	1
2	"Nothing Compares 2 U"	Sinéad O'Connor	1
3	"Sacrifice"/"Healing Hands"	Elton John	1
4	"Ice Ice Baby"	Vanilla Ice	1
5	"Killer"	Adamski	1
6	"Show Me Heaven"	Maria McKee	1
7	"Dub Be Good to Me"	Beats International	1
8	"Vogue"	Madonna	1
9	"World in Motion"	England New Order	1
10	"The Power"	Snap!	1
11	"Nessun Dorma"	Luciano Pavarotti	2
12	"A Little Time"	The Beautiful South	1
13	"Turtle Power"	Partners in Kryme	1
14	"It Must Have Been Love"	Roxette	3
15	"U Can't Touch This"	MC Hammer	3
16	"Itsy Bitsy Teeny Weeny Yellow Polka Dot Bikini"	Bombalurina	1
17	"Get Up! (Before the Night Is Over)"	Technotronic featuring Ya Kid K	2
18	"Black Velvet"	Alannah Myles	2
19	"Dirty Cash (Money Talks)"	The Adventures of Stevie V	2
20	"Don't Worry"	Kim Appleby	2
21	"Saviour's Day"	Cliff Richard	1
22	"Mona"	Craig McLachlan & Check 1–2	2
23	"Love Shack"	The B-52's	2
24	"The Joker"	The Steve Miller Band	1
25	"Opposites Attract"	Paula Abdul and The Wild Pair	2
26	"Groove Is in the Heart"/"What Is Love"	Deee-Lite	2
27	"Blue Velvet"	Bobby Vinton	2
28	"How Am I Supposed to Live Without You"	Michael Bolton	3
29	"I've Been Thinking About You"	Londonbeat	2
30	"Unbelievable"	EMF	3
31	"Naked in the Rain"	Blue Pearl	4
32	"Tom's Diner"	DNA featuring Suzanne Vega	2
33	"Ooops Up"	Snap!	5
34	"Tears on My Pillow"	Kylie Minogue	1
35	"Kingston Town"	UB40	4
36	"The Anniversary Waltz – Part One"	Status Quo	2
37	"Take My Breath Away"	Berlin	3 (Note: Reached number 1 in 1986)
38	"Better the Devil You Know"	Kylie Minogue	2
39	"Tonight"	New Kids on the Block	3
40	"I'm Free"	Soup Dragons featuring Junior Reid	5
41	"Lily Was Here"	David A. Stewart featuring Candy Dulfer	6
42	"Blue Savannah"	Erasure	3
43	"Justify My Love"	Madonna	2
44	Four Bacharach & David Songs EP	Deacon Blue	2
45	"Hold On"	En Vogue	5
46	"Hear the Drummer (Get Wicked)"	Chad Jackson	3
47	"Fantasy"	Black Box	5
48	"What Time Is Love? (Live at Trancentral)"	The KLF featuring the Children of the Revolution	5
49	"Got to Have Your Love"	Mantronix featuring Wondress	4
50	"Step On"	Happy Mondays	5

=== Best-selling artist albums of 1990 ===
Position	Title	Artist	Peak position
1	...But Seriously	Phil Collins	1
2	The Immaculate Collection	Madonna	1
3	In Concert	José Carreras/Placido Domingo/Luciano Pavarotti	1
4	The Very Best of Elton John	Elton John	1
5	Soul Provider	Michael Bolton	4
6	The Essential Pavarotti	Luciano Pavarotti	1
7	Only Yesterday	Carpenters	1
8	Sleeping with the Past	Elton John	1
9	Serious Hits... Live!	Phil Collins	2
10	Listen Without Prejudice Vol. 1	George Michael	1
11	The Rhythm of the Saints	Paul Simon	1
12	Vivaldi: The Four Seasons	Nigel Kennedy with the English Chamber Orchestra	3
13	Foreign Affair	Tina Turner	3 (Note: Reached number 1 in 1989)
14	Rocking All Over the Years	Status Quo	2
15	Labour of Love II	UB40	3
16	I Do Not Want What I Haven't Got	Sinéad O'Connor	1
17	From a Distance: The Event	Cliff Richard	3
18	The Singles Collection 1984/1990	Jimmy Somerville	4
19	The Road to Hell	Chris Rea	4 (Note: Reached number 1 in 1989)
20	Step By Step	New Kids on the Block	1
21	Hangin' Tough	New Kids on the Block	2
22	Pump Up the Jam: The Album	Technotronic	2
23	Choke	The Beautiful South	2
24	Vol. II: 1990 – A New Decade	Soul II Soul	1
25	I'm Your Baby Tonight	Whitney Houston	4
26	Changesbowie	David Bowie	1
27	I'm Breathless	Madonna	2
28	Heart of Stone	Cher	7
29	The Very Best of the Bee Gees	Bee Gees	6
30	Affection	Lisa Stansfield	2
31	The Best of Rod Stewart	Rod Stewart	6 (Note: Reached number 3 in 1989)
32	Journeyman	Eric Clapton	2
33	Summer Dreams: 28 Classic Tracks	The Beach Boys	2
34	Look Sharp!	Roxette	4
35	X	INXS	2
36	Please Hammer Don't Hurt 'Em	MC Hammer	8
37	Cuts Both Ways	Gloria Estefan	11 (Note: Reached number 1 in 1989)
38	Between the Lines	Jason Donovan	2
39	Violator	Depeche Mode	2
40	Behind the Mask	Fleetwood Mac	1
41	Cosmic Thing	The B-52s	8
42	Boomania	Betty Boo	4
43	Waking Hours	Del Amitri	6
44	Reflection	The Shadows	5
45	Natural History: The Very Best of Talk Talk	Talk Talk	3
46	Greatest Hits	The Bangles	4
47	The Stone Roses	The Stone Roses	9
48	Wild!	Erasure	12 (Note: Reached number 1 in 1989)
49	Shaking the Tree: Sixteen Golden Greats	Peter Gabriel	11
50	To the Extreme	Vanilla Ice	4

== Classical music ==
- John Rutter – Magnificat
- Colin Matthews – Strugnell's Haiku

== Opera ==
- Jonathan Dove – Hastings Spring
- John Metcalf – Tornrak
- Judith Weir – The Vanishing Bridegroom

== Births ==
- 1 February – Laura Marling, singer-songwriter
- 17 February – Alex Banfield, operatic tenor
- 29 April – Loick Essien, singer
- 17 June – Laura Wright, singer (All Angels)
- 11 July – George Craig, English singer-songwriter and model (One Night Only)
- 12 July – Maverick Sabre, singer-songwriter
- 18 July – Dan Croll, singer-songwriter
- 24 July – Jay McGuiness, English singer
- 4 September – Danny Worsnop, singer-songwriter (Asking Alexandria and We Are Harlot)
- 17 September – Pixie Geldof, model and singer, daughter of Bob Geldof and Paula Yates
- 26 November
  - Rita Ora, singer
  - Chip, rapper

== Deaths ==
- 18 January – Melanie Appleby, singer and dancer (Mel and Kim), 23
- 19 January – Alberto Semprini, pianist, conductor and composer, 81
- 1 February – Peter Racine Fricker, composer, 69
- 12 March – Harry South, jazz pianist, composer and arranger, 60
- 17 March – Ric Grech, bass guitarist (Family, Blind Faith), 43 (liver cirrhosis)
- 5 May – Sir Reginald Goodall, conductor, 88
- 6 June – Joe Loss, bandleader, 80
- 16 June – Dame Eva Turner, operatic soprano, 98
- 21 June – Elizabeth Harwood, operatic soprano, 52 (cancer)
- 16 July – Sidney Torch, pianist, organist, conductor, arranger and composer, 82 (suicide)
- 12 August – Roy Williamson, Scottish songwriter and musician (The Corries), writer of "Flower of Scotland", 54
- 28 August – Pamela Harrison, pianist, music teacher and composer, 74 (car accident)
- 25 September – Wilfred Burns, film composer, 73
- 4 October – Alyn Ainsworth, conductor, 66
- 8 October – B. J. Wilson, drummer of Procol Harum, 43 (pneumonia)
- 13 November – Richard Lewis, operatic tenor, 76
- date unknown – Leslie Osborne, composer of TV and radio themes, 85

== Music awards ==
=== Brit Awards ===
The 1990 Brit Awards winners were:

- Best British Producer: Dave Stewart
- Best Classical Recording: Simon Rattle – George Gershwin's "Porgy and Bess"
- Best International Artist: Neneh Cherry
- Best Music Video: The Cure – "Lullaby"
- Best Soundtrack: Batman
- British Album: Fine Young Cannibals – The Raw and the Cooked
- British Breakthrough Act: Lisa Stansfield
- British Female Solo Artist: Annie Lennox
- British Group: Fine Young Cannibals
- British Male Solo Artist: Phil Collins
- British Single: Phil Collins – "Another Day in Paradise"
- International Breakthrough Act: Neneh Cherry
- International Group: U2
- Outstanding Contribution: Queen

== See also ==
- 1990 in British radio
- 1990 in British television
- 1990 in the United Kingdom
- List of British films of 1990
