= 1991 in British music =

1991 in music in the United Kingdom saw 17 songs at number 1. The first number 1 of the year came from heavy metal band Iron Maiden, scoring their first and only number one "Bring Your Daughter... to the Slaughter" which stayed at the top for two weeks. The next number one was Enigma, with "Sadeness Part 1", which brought commercial success to the new age, chill out genre. Romanian-German producer Michael Cretu mixed repeated trance-like dance beats with gregorian chants and whispered, erotic vocals provided by his wife, Sandra. Enigma's debut concept album MCMXC ad also went straight to the top of the UK Album Chart in January.

In the album charts Simply Red entered with Stars which would prove to be the second best-selling album of the 90s and the best of 1991 and 1992. Although none of its singles reached no.1, title track "Stars" did make the top ten.

February saw cartoon character Bart Simpson reach No. 1 with "Do the Bartman", from the album The Simpsons Sing the Blues which reached #6. The show had premiered on UK screens on the satellite channel Sky One in 1990, though it did not premiere on terrestrial TV until 1996, on BBC One. The family became the first cartoon characters to hit No. 1 since The Archies did so in 1969, with "Sugar Sugar", and the follow-up ("Deep, Deep Trouble") also reached the top ten, peaking at No. 7 in April.

In March, The Clash received their first number 1 with "Should I Stay or Should I Go", after the song was used in a commercial for Levi's. A month later, Cher scored her first UK solo No. 1 with "The Shoop Shoop Song (It's in His Kiss)", taken from the film Mermaids.

Bryan Adams also reached No. 1 for the first time in July with "(Everything I Do) I Do It for You", from the film Robin Hood: Prince of Thieves. Breaking the record held since 1955, it stayed there for sixteen consecutive weeks, a record that remains to this day. It also became the biggest selling single of the year, selling over a million copies.

The Christmas number one single this year was Queen's "Bohemian Rhapsody", re-issued after the death of Freddie Mercury in November, coupled with "These Are the Days of Our Lives". As "Bohemian Rhapsody" had previously hit the top in 1975 (also becoming the Christmas number one) it became the first song ever to reach number 1 in two separate releases.

The classical music scene saw the death of Joy Finzi, who had founded the Finzi Trust in 1969 to commemorate her husband Gerald. Harrison Birtwistle's opera, Gawain, with a libretto by David Harsent, received its premiere at the Royal Opera House in May. Symphony Hall, Birmingham, with a big emphasis on acoustic flexibility, opened in April, with the official opening by the Queen in June.

== Events ==
- 14 January – Carter the Unstoppable Sex Machine's single "Bloodsport for All" is released on the day the Gulf War officially starts, and is banned by the BBC due to its lyrics about racism and bullying in the army.
- 15 January – A new all-star rendition of the John Lennon song "Give Peace a Chance" is released, featuring Yoko Ono, Lenny Kravitz, Peter Gabriel, Alannah Myles, Tom Petty, Bonnie Raitt and many more, billed as "The Peace Choir". The single is rushed to market in response to the imminent Gulf War.
- 4 February – Queen releases their final studio album of Freddie Mercury's lifetime, entitled Innuendo.
- 11 February – Massive Attack release their single "Unfinished Sympathy" but have to temporarily shorten their name to "Massive" to avoid a radio ban of the word "attack" during the Gulf War.
- 24 February – The Chamber Symphony for 15 players by Thomas Adès is performed for the first time, in West Road Concert Hall, Cambridge, directed by the composer.
- 15 May – The 2,262-seat concert venue Symphony Hall, Birmingham, home to the City of Birmingham Symphony Orchestra is opened for its first concerts, although the official opening by the Queen takes place on 12 June.
- 15 May – Richey Edwards of Manic Street Preachers carves the words "4 Real" into his arm with a razor blade during an interview with NME journalist Steve Lamacq, after Lamacq questions the band's authenticity. The incident results in Edwards requiring 18 stitches.
- 17 May – The first performance of Timon of Athens, a two act opera by Stephen Oliver, takes place at the London Coliseum by the English National Opera.
- 25 May – The Stone Roses are released from their contract with Silvertone Records by the High Court, winning up to £500,000 in damages from the label after the band's contract was dismissed by Judge Humphries as "unfair and unjustified". The band would then sign up to Geffen Records, though it would be another 3 years before new material would be released.
- 30 May – The opening night of Harrison Birtwistle's opera Gawain takes place in London at the Royal Opera House, Covent Garden, with Elgar Howarth conducting.
- 25 June – The first performance of James MacMillan's Tuireadh (Lament) for clarinet and string quartet, is given by James Campbell and the Allegri Quartet at St Magnus Cathedral in Kirkwall (Orkney Islands).
- 28 June – Paul McCartney's classical composition, the Liverpool Oratorio, receives its premiere at the Liverpool Anglican Cathedral.
- 7 July – The world premiere of John Casken's Cello Concerto takes place at the Schleswig-Holstein Musik Festival, with soloist Heinrich Schiff and the Northern Sinfonia.
- 14 August – Oasis play their first ever gig at the Boardwalk Club in Manchester. Noel Gallagher, who was at the time roadie for Inspiral Carpets, went with them to watch his brother's band play.
- 19 September – Summer Music: Concertino No.5 op.74 for oboe, clarinet, and string quartet by Robin Holloway is performed for the first time, at the Purcell Room.
- 27 October – Fruitbat of Carter the Unstoppable Sex Machine rugby tackles presenter Phillip Schofield at the Smash Hits Poll Winners Party after the group performs their single "After the Watershed".
- 9 November – The first performance of the Symphony No 3 by William Mathias takes place at St David's Hall, Cardiff, performed by the BBC Welsh Symphony Orchestra, conductor Grant Llewellyn.
- 24 November – Queen lead singer Freddie Mercury dies from Bronchopneumonia resulting from AIDS at the age of 45, at his home in Kensington, London, England.
- November – The Rolling Stones sign a new contract with Virgin Records.
- 1 December – George Harrison plays Yokohama, Japan. The brief Japanese tour with Eric Clapton marks his first set of formal concert performances since 1974.
- 11 December – The Strathclyde Concerto No 5 for violin, viola and orchestra by Peter Maxwell Davies, is performed for the first time in Glasgow.

== Publications ==
- Moura Lympany (with Margot Strickland) – Moura – Her Autobiography

== Charts ==
=== Number-one singles ===
Chart date (week ending)	Song	Artist(s)	Sales
5 January	"Bring Your Daughter... to the Slaughter"	Iron Maiden	41,599
12 January	"Bring Your Daughter... to the Slaughter"	Iron Maiden	32,032
19 January	"Sadness (Part I)"	Enigma	41,936
26 January	"Innuendo"	Queen	45,936
2 February	"3 a.m. Eternal"	The KLF	52,384
9 February	"3 a.m. Eternal"	The KLF	66,608
16 February	"Do the Bartman"	The Simpsons	52,256
23 February	"Do the Bartman"	The Simpsons	79,072
2 March	"Do the Bartman"	The Simpsons	69,120
9 March	"Should I Stay or Should I Go"	The Clash	56,688
16 March	"Should I Stay or Should I Go"	The Clash	60,752
23 March	"The Stonk"	Hale and Pace	83,840
30 March	"The One and Only"	Chesney Hawkes	42,368
6 April	"The One and Only"	Chesney Hawkes	61,360
13 April	"The One and Only"	Chesney Hawkes	51,872
20 April	"The One and Only"	Chesney Hawkes	46,048
27 April	"The One and Only"	Chesney Hawkes	33,008
4 May	"The Shoop Shoop Song (It's in His Kiss)"	Cher	70,544
11 May	"The Shoop Shoop Song (It's in His Kiss)"	Cher	88,384
18 May	"The Shoop Shoop Song (It's in His Kiss)"	Cher	65,664
25 May	"The Shoop Shoop Song (It's in His Kiss)"	Cher	60,048
1 June	"The Shoop Shoop Song (It's in His Kiss)"	Cher	47,616
8 June	"I Wanna Sex You Up"	Color Me Badd	45,456
15 June	"I Wanna Sex You Up"	Color Me Badd	56,288
22 June	"I Wanna Sex You Up"	Color Me Badd	52,176
29 June	"Any Dream Will Do"	Jason Donovan	97,520
6 July	"Any Dream Will Do"	Jason Donovan	93,056
13 July	"(Everything I Do) I Do It for You"	Bryan Adams	64,480
20 July	"(Everything I Do) I Do It for You"	Bryan Adams	97,296
27 July	"(Everything I Do) I Do It for You"	Bryan Adams	104,816
3 August	"(Everything I Do) I Do It for You"	Bryan Adams	113,376
10 August	"(Everything I Do) I Do It for You"	Bryan Adams	106,400
17 August	"(Everything I Do) I Do It for You"	Bryan Adams	104,400
24 August	"(Everything I Do) I Do It for You"	Bryan Adams	96,384
31 August	"(Everything I Do) I Do It for You"	Bryan Adams	94,224
7 September	"(Everything I Do) I Do It for You"	Bryan Adams	85,280
14 September	"(Everything I Do) I Do It for You"	Bryan Adams	81,072
21 September	"(Everything I Do) I Do It for You"	Bryan Adams	79,136
28 September	"(Everything I Do) I Do It for You"	Bryan Adams	74,784
5 October	"(Everything I Do) I Do It for You"	Bryan Adams	68,864
12 October	"(Everything I Do) I Do It for You"	Bryan Adams	58,656
19 October	"(Everything I Do) I Do It for You"	Bryan Adams	50,608
26 October	"(Everything I Do) I Do It for You"	Bryan Adams	45,728
2 November	"The Fly"	U2	66,160
9 November	"Dizzy"	Vic Reeves and The Wonder Stuff	64,800
16 November	"Dizzy"	Vic Reeves and The Wonder Stuff	57,488
23 November	"Black or White"	Michael Jackson	77,456
30 November	"Black or White"	Michael Jackson	76,544
7 December	"Don't Let the Sun Go Down on Me"	George Michael and Elton John	55,072
14 December	"Don't Let the Sun Go Down on Me"	George Michael and Elton John	82,960
21 December	"Bohemian Rhapsody" / "These Are the Days of Our Lives"	Queen	330,800
28 December	"Bohemian Rhapsody" / "These Are the Days of Our Lives"	Queen	263,392

=== Number-one albums ===
Chart date (week ending)	Album	Artist(s)
5 January	The Immaculate Collection	Madonna
12 January	The Immaculate Collection	Madonna
19 January	The Immaculate Collection	Madonna
26 January	MCMXC a.D.	Enigma
2 February	The Soul Cages	Sting
9 February	Doubt	Jesus Jones
16 February	Innuendo	Queen
23 February	Innuendo	Queen
2 March	Circle of One	Oleta Adams
9 March	Auberge	Chris Rea
16 March	Spartacus	The Farm
23 March	Out of Time	R.E.M.
30 March	Greatest Hits	Eurythmics
6 April	Greatest Hits	Eurythmics
13 April	Greatest Hits	Eurythmics
20 April	Greatest Hits	Eurythmics
27 April	Greatest Hits	Eurythmics
4 May	Greatest Hits	Eurythmics
11 May	Greatest Hits	Eurythmics
18 May	Greatest Hits	Eurythmics
25 May	Greatest Hits	Eurythmics
1 June	Seal	Seal
8 June	Seal	Seal
15 June	Seal	Seal
22 June	Greatest Hits	Eurythmics
29 June	Love Hurts	Cher
6 July	Love Hurts	Cher
13 July	Love Hurts	Cher
20 July	Love Hurts	Cher
27 July	Love Hurts	Cher
3 August	Love Hurts	Cher
10 August	Essential Pavarotti II	Luciano Pavarotti
17 August	Essential Pavarotti II	Luciano Pavarotti
24 August	Metallica	Metallica
31 August	Joseph and the Amazing Technicolor Dreamcoat	London Stage Cast
7 September	Joseph and the Amazing Technicolor Dreamcoat	London Stage Cast
14 September	From Time to Time – The Singles Collection	Paul Young
21 September	On Every Street	Dire Straits
28 September	Use Your Illusion II	Guns N' Roses
5 October	Waking Up the Neighbours	Bryan Adams
12 October	Stars	Simply Red
19 October	Stars	Simply Red
26 October	Chorus	Erasure
2 November	Stars	Simply Red
9 November	Greatest Hits II	Queen
16 November	Shepherd Moons	Enya
23 November	We Can't Dance	Genesis
30 November	Dangerous	Michael Jackson
7 December	Greatest Hits II	Queen
14 December	Greatest Hits II	Queen
21 December	Greatest Hits II	Queen
28 December	Greatest Hits II	Queen

== Year-end charts ==
=== Best-selling singles ===
No.	Title	Artist	Peak position
1	"(Everything I Do) I Do It for You"	Bryan Adams	1
2	"Bohemian Rhapsody"/"These Are the Days of Our Lives"	Queen	1
3	"The Shoop Shoop Song (It's in His Kiss)"	Cher	1
4	"I'm Too Sexy"	Right Said Fred	2
5	"Do the Bartman"	The Simpsons	1
6	"Any Dream Will Do"	Jason Donovan	1
7	"The One and Only"	Chesney Hawkes	1
8	"Dizzy"	Vic Reeves & the Wonder Stuff	1
9	"Insanity"	Oceanic	3
10	"I Wanna Sex You Up"	Color Me Badd	1
11	"Get Ready for This"	2 Unlimited	2
12	"3 a.m. Eternal" (Live at the S.S.L.)	The KLF featuring the Children of the Revolution	1
13	"Black or White"	Michael Jackson	1
14	"Let's Talk About Sex"	Salt-N-Pepa	2
15	"Don't Let the Sun Go Down on Me"	George Michael and Elton John	1
16	"More Than Words"	Extreme	2
17	"When You Tell Me That You Love Me"	Diana Ross	2
18	"Sunshine on a Rainy Day" (remix)	Zoë	4
19	"Should I Stay or Should I Go" / "Rush"	The Clash / Big Audio Dynamite II	1
20	"Sit Down"	James	2
21	"Wind of Change"	Scorpions	2
22	"The Stonk"	Hale and Pace and the Stonkers	1
23	"(I Wanna Give You) Devotion"	Nomad featuring MC Mikee Freedom	2
24	"Now That We Found Love"	Heavy D & the Boyz	2
25	"Baby Baby"	Amy Grant	2
26	"Charly"	The Prodigy	3
27	"Justified & Ancient (Stand by the JAMs)"	The KLF featuring Tammy Wynette	2
28	"World in Union"	Kiri Te Kanawa	4
29	"Promise Me"	Beverley Craven	3
30	"Last Train to Trancentral" (Live from the Lost Continent)	The KLF	2
31	"You Got the Love" (Erens Bootleg Mix)	The Source featuring Candi Staton	4
32	"Gypsy Woman (La Da Dee)"	Crystal Waters	2
33	"Thinking About Your Love"	Kenny Thomas	4
34	"Rhythm of My Heart"	Rod Stewart	3
35	"Set Adrift on Memory Bliss"	PM Dawn	3
36	"Love to Hate You"	Erasure	4
37	"Sadness (Part I)"	Enigma	1
38	"Crazy"	Seal	2
39	"Move Any Mountain"	The Shamen	4
40	"Everybody's Free (To Feel Good)"	Rozalla	6
41	"Saltwater"	Julian Lennon	6
42	"Sailing on the Seven Seas"	Orchestral Manoeuvres in the Dark	3
43	"Wiggle It"	2 in a Room	3
44	"Always Look on the Bright Side of Life"	Monty Python	3
45	"All 4 Love"	Color Me Badd	5
46	"Crazy for You" (remix)	Madonna	2
47	"Joyride"	Roxette	4
48	"Get Here"	Oleta Adams	4
49	"Gett Off"	Prince and the New Power Generation	4
50	"You Could Be Mine"	Guns N' Roses	3

=== Best-selling albums ===
No.	Title	Artist	Peak position
1	Stars	Simply Red	1
2	Greatest Hits	Eurythmics	1
3	Greatest Hits II	Queen	1
4	Simply the Best	Tina Turner	2
5	Dangerous	Michael Jackson	1
6	Out of Time	R.E.M.	1
7	Time, Love & Tenderness	Michael Bolton	2
8	The Immaculate Collection	Madonna	1
9	Love Hurts	Cher	1
10	From Time to Time – The Singles Collection	Paul Young	1
11	Seal	Seal	1
12	Waking Up the Neighbours	Bryan Adams	1
13	We Can't Dance	Genesis	1
14	On Every Street	Dire Straits	1
15	The Very Best of Elton John	Elton John	1
16	Beverley Craven	Beverley Craven	3
17	Michael Crawford Performs Andrew Lloyd Webber	Michael Crawford	3
18	Achtung Baby	U2	2
19	Auberge	Chris Rea	1
20	Shepherd Moons	Enya	1
21	Joyride	Roxette	2
22	Voices	Kenny Thomas	3
23	Greatest Hits 1977–1990	The Stranglers	4
24	Joseph and the Amazing Technicolor Dreamcoat	Original London Cast starring Jason Donovan	1
25	Greatest Hits	Queen	1
26	Essential Pavarotti II	Luciano Pavarotti	1
27	Diamonds and Pearls	Prince & the New Power Generation	2
28	Real Love	Lisa Stansfield	4
29	Chorus	Erasure	1
30	Listen Without Prejudice Vol. 1	George Michael	1
31	Innuendo	Queen	1
32	The Commitments (Original Soundtrack)	Various Artists	4
33	Into the Light	Gloria Estefan	2
34	MCMXC a.D.	Enigma	1
35	The Definitive Simon and Garfunkel	Simon & Garfunkel	8
36	Discography: The Complete Singles Collection	Pet Shop Boys	3
37	Wicked Game	Chris Isaak	3
38	Use Your Illusion II	Guns N' Roses	1
39	Together with Cliff Richard	Cliff Richard	10
40	In Concert	José Carreras/Placido Domingo/Luciano Pavarotti	1
41	Real Life	Simple Minds	2
42	Use Your Illusion I	Guns N' Roses	2
43	Vagabond Heart	Rod Stewart	2
44	Sugar Tax	Orchestral Manoeuvres in the Dark	3
45	The White Room	The KLF	3
46	Please Hammer Don't Hurt 'Em	MC Hammer	8
47	Fellow Hoodlums	Deacon Blue	2
48	Serious Hits... Live!	Phil Collins	2
49	Timeless: The Very Best of Neil Sedaka	Neil Sedaka	10
50	The Greatest Hits	Salt-n-Pepa	6

== Classical music ==
- Roy Douglas – Festivities and A Nowell Sequence for strings
- Michael Tippett – String Quartet No. 5

== Music awards ==
=== BRIT Awards ===
The 1991 BRIT Awards winners were:

- Best British producer: Chris Thomas
- Best classical recording: José Carreras, Plácido Domingo, Luciano Pavarotti – In Concert
- Best soundtrack: Twin Peaks
- British album: George Michael – Listen Without Prejudice Vol. 1
- British breakthrough act: Betty Boo
- British female solo artist: Lisa Stansfield
- British group: The Cure
- British male solo artist: Elton John
- British single: Depeche Mode – "Enjoy the Silence"
- British video: The Beautiful South – "A Little Time"
- International breakthrough act: MC Hammer
- International female: Sinéad O'Connor
- International group: INXS
- International male: Michael Hutchence
- Outstanding contribution: Status Quo

== Births ==
- 12 January – Pixie Lott, singer
- 17 February – Ed Sheeran, singer-songwriter
- 16 June – Joe McElderry, singer
- 17 June – Shura, singer, songwriter and producer
- 30 July – Diana Vickers, singer
- 11 November – Emma Blackery, singer
- 19 December – Declan Galbraith, singer
- 24 December – Louis Tomlinson, singer-songwriter

== Deaths ==
- 8 January – Steve Clark, guitarist (Def Leppard), 30 (alcohol poisoning)
- 21 February – Margot Fonteyn, ballerina, 71
- 9 March – Denise Tolkowsky, pianist and composer, 72
- 24 March – Maudie Edwards, actress and singer, 84
- 27 March – Alfredo Campoli, Italian-born violinist, 84
- 10 April – Martin Hannett (aka Martin Zero), record producer, 42 (heart failure)
- 20 April – Steve Marriott, singer, songwriter and guitarist (Small Faces and Humble Pie), 44 (killed in house fire)
- 11 June – John Vallier, pianist and composer, 70
- 14 June – Joy Finzi, founder of the Finzi Trust, 84
- 30 July – Max Jaffa, violinist and bandleader, 79
- 6 August – Max Rostal, Austrian-born violinist and viola player, 86
- 28 August – Vince Taylor, singer (Vince Taylor and the Playboys), 52
- 25 September – Sydney MacEwan, singer of traditional Scottish and Irish songs, 82
- 27 October – Sir Andrzej Panufnik, Polish-born composer and conductor, 77
- 8 November – Dave Rowbotham, musician, guitarist, (The Durutti Column, the Mothmen), 33 (murdered by unknown hand)
- 14 November – Bryden Thomson, conductor, 63
- 24 November – Freddie Mercury, singer and songwriter, 45 (pneumonia brought on by AIDS)
- 12 December – Ronnie Ross, jazz saxophonist, 58
- 31 December – Christopher Steel, composer, 53

== See also ==
- 1991 in British radio
- 1991 in British television
- 1991 in the United Kingdom
- List of British films of 1991
