= Essential Pavarotti II =

Greatest hits album by Luciano Pavarotti
- Released: 1991
- Genre: Opera
- Label: Decca Records

Essential Pavarotti II is an album by tenor Luciano Pavarotti. It was released in 1991 by Decca Records and peaked at number one on the UK Albums Chart. In doing so it duplicated its predecessor and became the second classical album to achieve this.

== Track listing ==
A side

1. "Questa o quella" (from Verdi's Rigoletto)
2. "Recondita armonia" (from Puccini's Tosca)
3. Brindisi: "Libiamo ne' lieti calici" (from verdi's La traviata)
4. "Amor ti vieta" (from Giordano's Fedora)
5. "Mi batte il cor ... O paradiso" from Meyerbeer's L'Africaine)
6. "Se quel guerrier io fossi! ... Celeste Aida" from Verdi's Aida
7. "Ch'ella mi creda" (from Puccini's La fanciulla del West)
8. "Donna non vidi mai" (from Puccini's Manon Lescaut)
9. "Pourquoi me réveiller?" (from Massenet's Werther
10. "O soave fanciulla" (from Puccini's La bohème)

B side

1. "Marechiare" (Neapolitan song by Paolo Tosti)
2. "Ave Maria" (lied by Schubert)
3. "La serenata" (song by Paolo Tosti)
4. "Panis angelicus" (by César Franck)
5. "In un palco della scala (With Apologies to Pink Panther)" (song by Henry Mancini)
6. "Caro mio ben" (arietta by Tommaso Giordani)
7. "Mamma" (song by Cesare Andrea Bixio and Bixio Cherubini)
8. "Nessun dorma" – live (from Puccini's Turandot)

== Chart performance ==
Chart (1991)	Peak position
UK Albums Chart	1
