= The Definitive Simon and Garfunkel =

Compilation album by Simon & Garfunkel
- Released: November 18, 1991
- Recorded: 1964–1969
- Genres: Folk rock, folk pop
- Length: 53:14
- Label: Columbia
- Producers: Tom Wilson; Bob Johnston; Paul Simon; Art Garfunkel; Roy Halee

Simon & Garfunkel chronology
20 Greatest Hits (1991)	The Definitive Simon and Garfunkel (1991)	Old Friends (1997)

Professional ratings
Review scores
Source	Rating
AllMusic	4/5 stars

The Definitive Simon and Garfunkel is the fourth compilation album of greatest hits by the folk duo Simon & Garfunkel, released in UK and Europe in 1991.

To promote the album, “A Hazy Shade of Winter” and “The Boxer” were re-released as singles in the UK in 1991 and 1992 respectively.

== Track listing ==
All songs written and composed by Paul Simon, except where noted.

1. "Wednesday Morning, 3 A.M."
2. "The Sound of Silence" (Acoustic version with electric overdubs)
3. "Homeward Bound"
4. "Kathy's Song" (Live)
5. "I Am a Rock"
6. "For Emily, Whenever I May Find Her" (Live)
7. "Scarborough Fair/Canticle" (Traditional, arranged by Paul Simon, Art Garfunkel)
8. "The 59th Street Bridge Song (Feelin' Groovy)"
9. "Seven O'Clock News/Silent Night"
10. "A Hazy Shade of Winter"
11. "El Condor Pasa (If I Could)" (Daniel Alomía Robles; English lyrics by Paul Simon, arranged by Jorge Milchberg)
12. "Mrs. Robinson"
13. "America"
14. "At the Zoo"
15. "Old Friends"
16. "Bookends Theme"
17. "Cecilia"
18. "The Boxer"
19. "Bridge over Troubled Water"
20. "Song for the Asking"

Tracks 1, 2 produced by Tom Wilson
Tracks 3, 5, 7–10, produced by Bob Johnston
Track 14 produced by Bob Johnston, Paul Simon, Art Garfunkel
Tracks 4, 6, 11–13, 15–20 produced by Paul Simon, Art Garfunkel & Roy Halee

Compiled by Art Garfunkel
Liner notes by Patrick Humphries

== Charts ==
=== Weekly charts ===
Chart	Position
Australian ARIA Album Chart	5
Austrian Albums Chart	43
Belgian Albums Chart (Wallonia)	5
Canadian RPM Albums Chart	37
Dutch Albums Chart	35
French SNEP Compilation Albums Chart	2
German Media Control Albums Chart	12
Japanese Oricon Albums Chart	13
New Zealand Albums Chart	12
Norwegian Albums Chart	1
Swedish Albums Chart	3
UK Albums Chart	8

=== Year-end charts ===
Chart (1993)	Position
French Albums Chart	37
Chart (1998)	Position
Belgian Albums Chart (Wallonia)	60

== Certifications ==
Region	Certification	Certified units/sales
Australia (ARIA)	Platinum	70,000^{^}
Belgium (BRMA)	Platinum	50,000^{*}
Canada (Music Canada)	Platinum	100,000^{^}
Finland (Musiikkituottajat)	Gold	29,600
France (SNEP)	Diamond	1,000,000^{*}
Germany (BVMI)	Gold	250,000^{^}
Japan (RIAJ)	2× Platinum	179,000
Netherlands (NVPI)	Gold	50,000^{^}
New Zealand (RMNZ)	Gold	7,500^{^}
Norway (IFPI Norway)	2× Platinum	100,000^{*}
Sweden (GLF)	Gold	50,000^{^}
Switzerland (IFPI Switzerland)	Gold	25,000^{^}
United Kingdom (BPI)	Platinum	300,000^{^}
^{*} Sales figures based on certification alone.^{^} Shipments figures based on certification alone.
