= Only Yesterday (album) =

Greatest hits album by the Carpenters
- Released: 1990
- Recorded: 1969–1981
- Genres: Pop, adult contemporary
- Label: A&M
- Producer: Richard Carpenter

The Carpenters chronology
Lovelines (1989)	Only Yesterday (1990)	From the Top (1991)

Professional ratings
Review scores
Source	Rating
AllMusic	2.5/5 stars

Only Yesterday (subtitled Richard & Karen Carpenter's Greatest Hits) is a greatest hits compilation album by American group the Carpenters. It was released in 1990 by A&M Records and peaked at number one on the UK Albums Chart for seven weeks.

== Re-issues ==
The album was released as Their Greatest Hits worldwide later in 1990, charting in several other countries and peaking at number one in New Zealand, also for seven weeks. This version has almost identical cover art except for the title as well as the addition of a sticker reading "20 Tracks, 76 Minutes Playing Time".

== Track listing ==
1. "Yesterday Once More" (remix)
2. "Superstar" (remix)
3. "Rainy Days and Mondays" (remix)
4. "Top of the World" (single mix)
5. "Ticket to Ride"
6. "Goodbye to Love" (remix)
7. "This Masquerade"
8. "Hurting Each Other"
9. "Solitaire"
10. "We've Only Just Begun" (remix)
11. "Those Good Old Dreams"
12. "Please Mr. Postman"
13. "I Won't Last a Day Without You"
14. "Touch Me When We're Dancing"
15. "Jambalaya (On the Bayou)"
16. "For All We Know"
17. "All You Get from Love Is a Love Song"
18. "(They Long to Be) Close to You"
19. "Only Yesterday"
20. "Calling Occupants of Interplanetary Craft (The Recognised Anthem of World Contact Day)" (remix)

== Charts ==
Chart (1990–1993)	Peak position
Australian Albums (ARIA)	9
Dutch Albums (Album Top 100)	3
Finnish Albums (The Official Finnish Charts)	8
New Zealand Albums (RMNZ)	1
Norwegian Albums (VG-lista)	8
UK Albums (Official Charts)	1
European Albums (Eurotipsheet)	7

Chart (1996)	Peak position
Scottish Albums (Official Charts)	33

== Certifications ==
Region	Certification	Certified units/sales
Argentina (CAPIF)	Gold	30,000^{^}
Australia (ARIA)	Platinum	70,000^{^}
Finland (Musiikkituottajat)	Gold	25,000
Japan (RIAJ)	Gold	100,000^{^}
Mexico (AMPROFON)	Gold	100,000
New Zealand (RMNZ)	Platinum	15,000^{^}
United Kingdom (BPI)	5× Platinum	1,500,000^{^}
^{^} Shipments figures based on certification alone.
