= The Essential Pavarotti =

Compilation album by Luciano Pavarotti
- Released: 1990
- Label: Decca

The Essential Pavarotti is a compilation album by Italian operatic tenor Luciano Pavarotti, released in 1990 by Decca Records. It contains arias and excerpts from works by several major composers, including operas in which Pavarotti had previously performed, along with popular Italian songs that, according to the compilation's liner notes written by Mel Cooper, editor-in-chief of the magazine Opera Now, "represent [Pavarotti's] childhood, his roots."

The compilation peaked at number one on the UK Albums Chart, becoming the first ever classical album to do so.

== Track listing ==
No.	Title	Writer(s)	Origin	Length
1.	"La donna è mobile"	Giuseppe Verdi	Rigoletto – Act 3 (1851)	2:23
2.	"Che gelida manina"	Giacomo Puccini	La bohème – Act 1 (1896)	4:41
3.	"E lucevan le stelle"	Puccini	Tosca – Act 3 (1900)	3:13
4.	"Nessun dorma"	Puccini	Turandot – Act 3 (1926)	3:01
5.	"Una furtiva lagrima"	Gaetano Donizetti	L'elisir d'amore – Act 2 (1832)	4:47
6.	"M'appari"	Friedrich von Flotow	Martha – Act 3 (1847)	3:31
7.	"La fleur que tu m'avais jetée"	Georges Bizet	Carmen – Act 2 (1875)	4:29
8.	"Vesti la giubba"	Ruggero Leoncavallo	Pagliacci – Act 1 (1892)	3:39
9.	"Di quella pira"	Verdi	Il trovatore / Act 3 (1853)	2:14
10.	"Caruso"	Lucio Dalla	inspired by operatic tenor Enrico Caruso (1986)	5:19
11.	"Mattinata"	Leoncavallo	first song written for the Gramophone Company; dedicated to Caruso, the first singer to record it (1904)	2:01
12.	"Aprile"	Paolo Tosti	salon song for voice and piano (1882)	3:25
13.	"Core 'ngrato"	Salvatore Cardillo	Neapolitan song (1911)	4:55
14.	"La Danza"	Gioachino Rossini	Soirées musicales (1835)	3:09
15.	"Volare"	Domenico Modugno; Franco Migliacci	single and Italian entrant for the third edition of the Eurovision Song Contest (1958)	4:35
16.	"Funiculì, funiculà"	Luigi Denza; Peppino Turco	written to commemorate the opening of the first funicular railway on Mount Vesuvius (1880)	2:45
17.	"Torna a Surriento"	Ernesto De Curtis; Giambattista De Curtis	Neapolitan song (1902)	4:27
18.	"'O sole mio"	Eduardo di Capua; Alfredo Mazzucchi; Giovanni Capurro	Neapolitan song (1898)	3:25

== Charts ==
Chart performance for The Essential Pavarotti
Chart (1990)	Peak position
Australian Albums (ARIA)	11
New Zealand Albums (RMNZ)	6
UK Albums (Official Charts)	1

== Certifications ==
Region	Certification	Certified units/sales
Australia (ARIA)	Gold	35,000^{^}
^{^} Shipments figures based on certification alone.
