= 1996 in British television =

This is a list of British television-related events from 1996.

== Events ==
=== January ===
- 1 January – The James Bond film Never Say Never Again is aired as part of BBC1's New Year's Day schedule, starring Sean Connery.
- 3 January – Debut on BBC1 of Hetty Wainthropp Investigates, starring Patricia Routledge.
- 7 January – The Herald (Glasgow) reports that STV has sold its shares in HTV to United News and Media.
- 8 January – Rainbow Days, a television programme for preschoolers and the replacement programme for the toy shop format of Rainbow, is launched on CITV at 3:30pm.
- 9 January – The American science-fiction series The X-Files makes its debut on BBC1 with the episode "Humbug".
- 12 January – Gaby Roslin presents her final edition of The Big Breakfast on Channel 4 after three years, weeping live on the air.
- 14 January – The network television premiere on ITV of Father of the Bride, starring Steve Martin and Diane Keaton.
- 15 January – Zoe Ball begins hosting The Big Breakfast on Channel 4.
- 15 January–11 March – Our Friends in the North, a nine-part drama spanning from the 1960s to the 1990s in the lives of four friends, begins airing on BBC2.
- 22 January – The Sci-Fi Channel begins airing episodes 109–150 of the BSB soap Jupiter Moon which were not televised during the series' original 1990 run. Two episodes are aired per day up to 19 February.
- 23 January – The network television premiere on ITV of Single White Female, starring Bridget Fonda and Jennifer Jason Leigh.
- 26 January – The findings of the judicial review into the ITC's decision to award the licence for a fifth UK television channel to Channel 5 Broadcasting Ltd are published. The review concludes that there was no illegality or unfairness in the process.
- January – L!VE TV introduces the News Bunny.

=== February ===
- 1 February – Channel One launches its second channel, in Bristol and Bath.
- 5 February – Breakfast News Extra is launched. The 20-minute programme, which airs at the end of the main edition of Breakfast News, is presented by Juliet Morris.
- 9 February – The entertainment show TFI Friday makes its debut on Channel 4, presented by Chris Evans. The show ran for six series over four and a half years until the year 2000.
- 11 February – Debut on BBC1 of the Irish-set drama series Ballykissangel.
- 18 February – The final episode of the long-running satirical puppet show Spitting Image airs on ITV.
- 19 February – At the 1996 BRIT Awards, aired by ITV, Pulp's lead singer Jarvis Cocker invades the stage during Michael Jackson's performance of "Earth Song". Jackson, surrounded by children, was dressed as a Christ-like figure, an image which Cocker found objectionable.
- 21 February – Debut on BBC1 of the crime drama Silent Witness, starring Amanda Burton.
- 24 February – BBC1 begins airing a four-part adaptation of Minette Walters' psychological thriller The Sculptress. The miniseries stars Pauline Quirke, Caroline Goodall and Christopher Fulford, and is shown over two consecutive weekends, on 24–25 February and 2–3 March.

=== March ===
- 1 March – The Media Authority of Berlin and Brandenburg (Medienanstalt Berlin-Brandenburg) awards a terrestrial television licence to BBC World, thought to be the first time a country has awarded a television frequency to a foreign broadcaster.
- 2 March – The network television premiere on ITV of The Marrying Man, starring Kim Basinger and Alec Baldwin.
- 8 March – Mersey Television boss and creator of Channel 4 soaps Brookside and Hollyoaks Phil Redmond predicts that every major soap on television will be aired five nights a week.
- 11 March – Launch of the business and financial news channel CNBC Europe, which is based in London.
- 13 March – In the wake of the Dunblane school massacre, ITV postpones the James Bond film Licence to Kill, which was due to be shown this evening.
- 14 March – Channel 4 is forced to apologise to viewers after an ident showing The Big Breakfast presenter Mark Little firing a gun at the camera is seen on screen the day after the Dunblane school massacre.
- 16 March
  - Cable channel L!VE TV stages a live reconstruction of the Frank Bruno vs. Mike Tyson fight using lookalike boxers as a way of hitting back at pay-per-view television on which the actual fight is being shown.
  - The network television premiere on ITV of A Few Good Men, starring Tom Cruise, Demi Moore and Jack Nicholson.
  - Debut of the crime drama series Dalziel and Pascoe on BBC1.
  - Launch of the pay-per-view service Sky Box Office.
- 18 March – Debut of the drama series This Life on BBC2.
- 19 March – Debut of And the Beat Goes On on Channel 4.
- 24 March
  - ITV airs Coronation Street – The Cruise, something which proves to be controversial as the film had only been released on VHS a few months earlier to celebrate the show's 35th anniversary.
  - The final episode of the long-running storytelling series Jackanory airs on BBC2, although it would be briefly revived in 2006.
- 26 March – Cadbury becomes the first company to sponsor Coronation Street after signing a deal with Granada. The sponsorship will begin in September.
- 30 March – The final episode of Saturday Disney airs on ITV.
- March – After two years of Pages from Ceefax Level 2 teletext graphics, they return to using the more basic Level 1 Teletext format.

=== April ===
- 1 April
  - Sir Christopher Bland succeeds Marmaduke Hussey as Chairman of the BBC.
  - All BBC commercial activities, including BBC Publications, are merged into BBC Enterprises Ltd.
- 2 April – The comic strip character from The Beano Dennis the Menace is brought to life with a new animated series on BBC1 as part of the CBBC lineup.
- 5 April – BBC1 airs Eskimo Day, Jack Rosenthal's poignant comedy about parents letting go of their children when they make their way in the world.
- 11 April – Channel 4 trials an overnight sports programme. Airing for six weeks, Nightsports mixes comment and live action from America.
- 13 April
  - Channel 4 airs the first of ten editions of The Gaby Roslin Show, a chat show presented by Gaby Roslin which aims to recapture the atmosphere of 1970s series such as Parkinson. Ratings for the show quickly fall from 3 million to less than a million and it is panned by viewers and critics alike.
  - Andi Peters and Emma Forbes present their final edition of Live & Kicking on BBC1.
- 15 April – ITV airs Episode 4000 of Coronation Street.
- 18 April
  - The ITC confirms the awarding of the Channel 5 licence to Channel 5 Broadcasting Ltd, setting out its broadcasting remit. 50% of programming must be original, while there are quotas for the amount of public service programming that must be aired.
  - Marketing (magazine) reports that Midland Bank will sponsor ITV Drama Premieres, starting on 1 May with the latest series of Sharpe.
- 21 April – The BBC Arabic television service closes down when the Saudi backer pulls out following a row over coverage of the execution of a princess accused of adultery.
- 23 April – Debut of Edward on Edward, a documentary produced for ITV by Prince Edward's company Ardent Productions and is presented by the Prince himself. It tells the story of the Abdication of Edward VIII.
- 27 April – Bob Monkhouse presented his 1st edition of The National Lottery Live.
- 27 April – Granada confirms that O. J. Simpson has been booked to appear on the first edition of Richard Madeley and Judy Finnigan's new series, Tonight with Richard and Judy, scheduled to air on 13 May. The former football star will be paid a nominal fee of £1 for his first interview since being cleared of murder in 1995, though Granada will also pay for his travel expenses. The interview proves to be controversial, with both Madeley and Finnigan attracting media criticism for what is deemed to be their "candyfloss" questioning of Simpson. Ultimately, the show airs for just one series.
- April – The BBC becomes the world's first digital terrestrial broadcaster after conducting a test transmission.

=== May ===
- 1 May – Imperial College London wins the 1995–96 series of University Challenge on BBC2, beating the London School of Economics 275–220.
- 2 May – Debut on BBC1 of Airport, a fly-on-the-wall documentary series about London's Heathrow Airport.
- 6 May – BBC1 airs the first episode of a new series of The Liver Birds, which catches up with Beryl (Polly James) and Sandra (Nerys Hughes), two decades on from the original series.
- 9 May – The BBC announces its plans for digital television. They include a free-to-air news channel, widescreen versions of BBC1 and BBC2, "side channels" which will broadcast extra programmes related to what is on the main channels and several paid-for channels featuring programming from the BBC archives.
- 13 May – After an eight year absence, the game show Call My Bluff returns to BBC1, presented by Bob Holness.
- 18 May – Ireland's Eimear Quinn wins the 1996 Eurovision Song Contest with "The Voice".
- 21 May – Bill Treacher makes his final appearance as EastEnders character Arthur Fowler. Having left the series in December 1995, he briefly returned to the role of Arthur to film scenes in which his character is killed off.
- 24 May – The final edition of Good Morning with Anne and Nick airs on BBC1.
- 25 May
  - Paul Doody wins the seventh series of Stars in Their Eyes on ITV, performing as Marti Pellow. He is the second Grand Final winner to portray the singer.
  - Debut of the golf-based game show Full Swing on BBC1, presented by Jimmy Tarbuck. However, the series is not a success and is axed after eight episodes on 27 July.
- 27 May – Doctor Who, an American television film continuation of the British series of the same name, airs on BBC1. It is regarded as being a part of the same story as the original series and is an unsuccessful pilot for a new, American co-produced series. This marks the end of Sylvester McCoy's era as the Seventh Doctor. Paul McGann stars as the Eighth Doctor. Doctor Who would return for a full series when it was revived in 2005.

=== June ===
- 1 June – Darren Day succeeds Matthew Kelly as the presenter of You Bet! on ITV. He is joined on the show by Diane Youdale, best known for appearing as Jet on Gladiators, who presents the challenges filmed on location.
- 5 June – Channel 4 beginning showing the American horror series American Gothic, starring Gary Cole.
- 7 June – The BBC is restructured by the Director-General John Birt. In the new structure, BBC Broadcast will commission programmes and BBC Production will make them.
- 8–30 June – The BBC and ITV broadcast live coverage of Euro 96 which is held in England.
- 8 June – The final edition of International Gladiators aired on ITV, the series 2 grand final also marked the final appearance for the female Gladiator Jet.
- 10 June – For the Summer period, the late afternoon block of children's programmes aired on BBC1 are transferred to BBC2.
- 14 June – After thirty-two years, excluding six months in 1973 and one month in 1974, Top of the Pops moves from Thursdays to Fridays on BBC1.
- 21 June – Debut of the children's game show To Me... To You... on BBC2 and later on BBC1, presented by the Chuckle Brothers.
- 26 June – The BBC and ITV broadcast live coverage of the England v. Germany semi-final match of Euro 96 that is collectively watched by twenty-six million viewers.
- 30 June – Neil Haidar wins the 1996 series of MasterChef on BBC1.

=== July ===
- 7 July – BBC1 airs Killing Me Softly, a Screen One film about the Sara Thornton case that stars Maggie O'Neill and Peter Howitt.
- 9 July – The final episode of the game show Going for Gold airs on BBC1, although it would make a brief return to Channel 5 in 2008.
- 11 July
  - BBC2 airs South African President Nelson Mandela's address to the Houses of Parliament. The programme is introduced by Michael Buerk.
  - ITV announces a deal with Doritos sponsoring ITV Movies with the premieres of Demolition Man, Unforgiven, The Fugitive, The Pelican Brief, In the Line of Fire, A Few Good Men, Groundhog Day and Sleepless in Seattle, the sponsorship will begin on 17 August.
- 19 July–4 August – The BBC provides full live coverage of the 1996 Olympic Games. Live coverage runs for 15 hours a day: 1:40pm until 4:30am with highlights at breakfast time and morning-long extended highlights of the previous day's action. In addition to BBC1's coverage for the first time, the BBC also provides alternative live action during the overnight hours on BBC2.
- 24 July – Buckingham Palace ends the BBC's monopoly on producing the Royal Christmas Message which has been the sole responsibility of the broadcaster for 63 years. It is produced by ITV from 1997, before returning to the BBC in 1999, then ITV again from 2001, and so on in continuation.
- 25 July – A report commissioned collectively by the broadcasters that make up ITV claims that Channel 5's plans to retune millions of televisions and video recorders are inadequate and underfunded. The report follows a survey conducted on 700 households in Channel 5's pilot retuning area in Surrey which says fewer than 60 per cent of households have been contacted by the retuning teams and less than 50 per cent have had their equipment successfully retuned.
- 26 July
  - The BBC and Hat Trick Productions are fined £10,000 each in the High Court for contempt of court over comments made on a 1994 edition of Have I Got News for You, in which presenter Angus Deayton referred to Ian and Kevin Maxwell as "two heartless, scheming bastards" ahead of their trial.
  - Scottish acquires Caledonian Publishing, at this time publishers of The Herald (Glasgow) and Glasgow Evening Times, and renames itself Scottish Media Group (SMG).
- 29 July – Sources at Channel 5 Broadcasting confirm the estimated cost of the retuning operation required for people to watch the channel has risen by at least 25 per cent above the original £55 million budget.

=== August ===
- 10 August
  - BBC1 begins airing Stephen King's The Stand, a miniseries based on the novel of the same name. It is shown in four parts over two weekends, on 10–11 August and 17–18 August.
  - The network television premiere of Uli Edel's 1993 erotic thriller Body of Evidence on BBC1, starring Madonna, Willem Dafoe, Joe Mantegna, Anne Archer and Julianne Moore.
- 13 August – Flextech plc, the second largest supplier of subscription television in the United Kingdom, confirms it is in talks with the BBC about setting up to six new cable and satellite channels.
- 16 August
  - The American animated science-fiction comedy series Captain Simian & the Space Monkeys makes its UK debut on ITV before airing in its homeland the following month.
  - Sky Sports 3 launches with broadcasting hours of midday to midnight and Sky Sports Gold closes.
- 22 August – BBC World begins broadcasting to Berlin.
- 27 August – The late afternoon block of children's programmes returns to BBC1.
- 30 August
  - London Weekend Television launches new idents.
  - Zoe Ball presents her final edition of The Big Breakfast on Channel 4; she is leaving the series in order to present BBC1's Live & Kicking with Jamie Theakston.
- August – David Elstein of BSkyB is appointed Chief Executive of Channel 5.

=== September ===
- 1 September
  - Sky 2 launches. It is a sister channel to the then-titled Sky1. It closes a year later, but a channel of almost the same name would launch in 2005.
  - The Computer Channel is launched. It is later renamed .tv (pronounced Dot TV).
  - Two American weather channels launch UK versions. The Weather Channel begins broadcasting in the UK. It transmits for five hours each morning on Sky and 24 hours on cable in some areas. The Weather Network launches on the same day on many other cable networks. They take advantage of the localness of cable franchises by providing on-screen local weather forecasts.
  - London's Burning returns to ITV for a new series, its ninth since launching in 1988 and the first to be shown in two halves, with an American-style hiatus over Christmas. Following episode 11 on 17 November, the series takes a break until 12 January 1997 when the final four episodes of the series are shown. London's Burning continues to air with this format until the end of the thirteenth series in 2001. The hiatus is shifted to coincide with Easter from the twelfth series when it becomes part of ITV's Winter schedule rather than its Autumn line-up.
- 2 September
  - Carlton Television's first spin-off channel, Carlton Food Network, launches exclusively on cable. It broadcasts on weekday afternoons and shares space with SelecTV.
  - Launch of "Daytime on 1", BBC1's new daily schedule that includes six and a half hours of drama, quiz shows, discussion programming, chat shows and cooking shows.
  - The ITV region Tyne Tees Television is rebranded as Channel 3 North East. The rebranding is unsuccessful and returns to its original name two years later.
  - Former Olympic swimmer Sharron Davies succeeds Zoe Ball on The Big Breakfast on Channel 4.
- 4 September – Debut on BBC2 of the makeover series Changing Rooms, presented by Carol Smillie.
- 5 September – The Canadian animated series based on the books by Else Holmelund Minarik and Maurice Sendak called Little Bear makes its UK debut on BBC1.
- 9 September – The NBC Super Channel renames itself as NBC Europe or simply known as NBC on the air.
- 10 September – The Nickelodeon animated series Hey Arnold! makes its UK debut on ITV a month before its debut in America.
- 12 September – The children's magazine show It's a Mystery makes its debut on ITV.
- 14 September – The final episode of the practical jokes series Beadle's About is broadcast on ITV.
- 15 September – Debut of Rhodes, an eight-part BBC1 series about the life of the controversial British adventurer and empire-builder Cecil Rhodes. The series concludes on 3 November. It took a decade to make, employed over 10,000 extras and at a cost of £10 million is the most expensive British television project to date. However, despite a high-profile publicity campaign leading up to its launch, Rhodes attracts relatively poor viewing figures with 7.6 million tuning into the first episode and 4.8 million watching the second and it is quickly panned by critics. The BBC is also forced to launch an accompanying booklet about Cecil Rhodes as the series assumes a prior knowledge of the figure and many viewers are unfamiliar with him.
- 20 September – The Independent reports that Channel 5 will employ another 1,500 people to undertake its retuning operation, bringing the total number of people working on the task to 8,500. An estimated 11.4 million televisions and video recorders will need to be retuned before the channel goes on air next year.
- 21 September – Zoe Ball and Jamie Theakston present their first edition of Live & Kicking on BBC1.
- 29 September – It is reported that the comedian and television presenter Leslie Crowther has died at the age of 63, that same day saw the death of London's Burning's most popular characters in the form of John Hallam played by Sean Blowers.
- 30 September – Debut of the three-part fantasy drama Wilderness on ITV, starring Amanda Ooms, Michael Kitchen and Owen Teale, which is based on Dennis Danvers 1991 lupine horror novel of the same name, adapted by Andrew Davies and Bernadette Davis. It concludes on 14 October.

=== October ===
- 1 October
  - Granada Sky Broadcasting launches with four new channels, Granada Plus, Men & Motors, Granada Good Life and Granada Talk TV.
  - The Granada-produced series Springhill makes its debut on Sky1; it is a supernatural soap set in Liverpool that airs for two series of 26 episodes. It is later shown on Channel 4.
- 2 October – It is reported that Channel 5 Broadcasting is planning to bid for newly available space on the Astra 1A satellite in the hope of reaching a further one million UK viewers.
- 5 October – Channel 4 airs The Ghost of Ivy Tilsley, a programme telling the story of singer and actress Lynne Perrie, who played Ivy Tilsley, in Coronation Street in which she speaks about her time with the soap and how she lost her sense of self in her search for fame.
- 6 October – Scottish Television launches new idents.
- 7 October – The final episode of the game show Turnabout is broadcast on BBC1 after six years on the air.
- 9 October – Debut on BBC2 of the cookery series Two Fat Ladies, presented by Clarissa Dickson Wright and Jennifer Paterson.
- 11 October – After nearly 14 years, Channel 4 is given a whole new look replacing the original coloured blocks idents with all-new circles idents.
- 13 October – The BBC's coverage of Formula One ends after 20 years with coverage of the Japanese Grand Prix. The broadcast rights are transferred to ITV the following year, the BBC would regain the rights in 2009.
- 19 October – Fox Kids Network launches in the UK, becoming the first Fox Kids channel in Europe.
- 23 October
  - NYNEX, Vidéotron and Bell Cablemedia merge with the subsidiary of Cable & Wireless, Mercury Communications. The new company is called Cable & Wireless Communications.
  - The network television premiere of Groundhog Day on ITV, starring Bill Murray and Andie MacDowell.
- 24 October – The American sitcom 3rd Rock from the Sun makes its UK debut on BBC2.
- 26 October
  - ITV shows the Jonathan Ross hosted documentary In Search of Dracula, followed by the UK terrestrial premiere of the 1992 Francis Ford Coppola film Bram Stoker's Dracula, starring Gary Oldman, Winona Ryder, Keanu Reeves and Anthony Hopkins.
- 27 October – Lucy Wright wins the 1996 series of Junior MasterChef on BBC1.
- October – United News & Media buys Scottish Television's 20% stake in HTV.

=== November ===
- 1 November
  - Sky Scottish launches. The channel is a joint venture between Scottish Television and British Sky Broadcasting.
  - Sky Soap changes broadcasting hours from 7am to 11am to the new hours of 12pm to 4pm, and refreshes its schedule with the introduction of UK soaps Take the High Road and Emmerdale Farm, both from the beginning. These two would remain fixtures on the channel until its closure in 1999.
  - Discovery extends its broadcast hours by two hours and is now on air between 4pm and 2am.
- 6–7 November – A two-part special episode of the sitcom Absolutely Fabulous called The Last Shout is broadcast on BBC1. It is billed as the final episode at the time but the series will return in 2001.
- 11 November – UTV introduces a new series of idents which showcase scenic locations in Northern Ireland. These include the Giant's Causeway, a waterfall at Glenarriff and Portaferry harbour. Some of the idents feature UTV personalities.
- 12 November – Debut of the music-based comedy panel show Never Mind the Buzzcocks on BBC2, presented by Mark Lamarr.
- 14 November – ITV airs the 2000th episode of Home and Away.
- 15 November – Sarah Lancashire makes her final appearance in Coronation Street as Raquel Watts.
- 17 November – BBC1 airs Ruby Wax Meets the Duchess of York, a one-off interview with Sarah, Duchess of York conducted by American comedian Ruby Wax.
- 21 November – Campaign (magazine) reports that ITV's decision to stop airing Baywatch midway through the season and replace it with Sabrina the Teenage Witch has raised questions about the vulnerability of sponsorship deals to programme rescheduling. Wella had renewed its sponsorship of Baywatch with ITV earlier in the year, but the show has been pulled from its Saturday evening timeslot after only eight of the scheduled twenty-two episodes were shown with Sabrina the Teenage Witch, set to air from 23 November. ITV says the decision was taken because it began airing Baywatch earlier than planned after a previously scheduled programme, SeaQuest 2032 did not prove as popular with viewers as anticipated; this led to episodes of Baywatch catching up with their airdates in America. ITV says the programme will return in 1997 while Wella will continue its sponsorship.
- 23 November – The BBC picks up the terrestrial rights to The Simpsons, which is first shown at 5:30pm on BBC1 with a Sunday lunchtime repeat on BBC2. There's No Disgrace Like Home is the first episode to be shown on BBC1, later being beaten in the ratings by Sabrina the Teenage Witch which makes its UK debut on that day.
- 24 November – ITV introduces a fourth weekly episode of Coronation Street, airing on Sundays at 7:30pm.
- 25 November – Carlton launches a new set of idents.
- 30 November – During a live broadcast of The National Lottery Live on BBC1, the draw machine does not start, causing it to be delayed by 50 minutes. Resident psychic Mystic Meg later said that she had been predicting it all day.

=== December ===
- 6 December – The Adam and Joe Show, written and hosted by comedy performers Adam Buxton and Joe Cornish, makes its debut on Channel 4.
- 12 December – The game show Strike It Lucky returns under the new name of Michael Barrymore's Strike It Rich on ITV. Like its predecessor, it is presented by Michael Barrymore.
- 17 December – BBC2 shows the first episode of the four-part Gothic Horror documentary series Nightmare: Birth of Horror. Written and hosted by Christopher Frayling, the series looks at the creators of the horror genre, Mary Shelley, Bram Stoker, Robert Louis Stevenson and Arthur Conan Doyle, and examines their impact and cultural legacy.
- 18 December – Labour Party leader Tony Blair is a guest on ITV's Des O'Connor Tonight where he admits to trying to run away from school as a teenager by attempting to stow away on a flight to the Bahamas.
- 21 December – BBC1 airs the first Christmas episode of The Simpsons.
- 23 December – ITV airs the pilot of In the Dark with Julian Clary, a game show in which couples must complete everyday tasks while in complete darkness. The show is not picked up for a full series by ITV, but a series is recorded for the United States where Julian Clary will be introduced to American viewers. However, it is pulled a few hours before its transmission. Two series of In the Dark are later produced for Channel 5 starting in 1998, but presented by Junior Simpson.
- 24 December – Christmas Eve highlights on BBC1 include the network television premieres of Super Mario Brothers, starring Bob Hoskins, John Leguizamo and Dennis Hopper and Cliffhanger, starring Sylvester Stallone.
- 25 December
  - Christmas Day highlights on BBC1 include the network television premiere of Steven Spielberg's 1993 dinosaur adventure film Jurassic Park and "The Christmas Lunch Incident" episode of The Vicar of Dibley.
  - Only Fools and Horses.... returns with a new episode after three years with Heroes and Villains, the first of a three-part miniseries that Radio Times suggests "may prove to be its swansong". The second part, Modern Men, airs on 27 December, followed by the final part, Time on Our Hands on 29 December.
  - Top of the Pops is guest presented by the Spice Girls. Their three performances are introduced by Robbie Williams, Mark Morrison and Gina G.
- 26 December
  - The network television premieres of Sommersby, a 1993 period drama starring Richard Gere and Jodie Foster and Free Willy, starring Jason James Richter and Lori Petty, both on BBC1.
  - Ian Kelsey makes his final appearance in Emmerdale when Dave Glover dies in a fire.
- 27 December – The network television premiere of The Firm on BBC1, starring Tom Cruise and Jeanne Tripplehorn.
- 29 December – Time On Our Hands, the final episode of the Christmas trilogy of the sitcom Only Fools and Horses...., airs on BBC1. Originally publicised as the last ever episode, it draws 24.35 million viewers, the largest ever audience for a sitcom in the UK and discounting the funeral of Diana, Princess of Wales, the following year, the biggest UK television audience of the 1990s. However, the show returns for three subsequent specials, one shown each Christmas from 2001.
- 31 December – New Year's Eve highlights on BBC1 include Star Trek VI: The Undiscovered Country, starring William Shatner and Leonard Nimoy, and Shadowlands, starring Anthony Hopkins.

== Debuts ==
=== BBC1 ===
- 1 January – The Peacock Spring (1996)
- 2 January – The Demon Headmaster (1996–1998)
- 3 January
  - Agent Z and the Penguin from Mars (1996)
  - Hetty Wainthropp Investigates (1996–1998)
- 4 January – The Morph Files (1996)
- 8 January – The Genie from Down Under (1996–1998)
- 16 January – Free Willy (1994)
- 28 January – A Mug's Game (1996)
- 11 February – Ballykissangel (1996–2001)
- 12 February – BBC Newsline (1996–present)
- 14 February
  - Out of Tune (1996–1998)
  - Into the Fire (1996)
- 15 February – Alien Empire (1996)
- 21 February – Silent Witness (1996–present)
- 24 February – The Sculptress (1996)
- 10 March – Witness Against Hitler (1996)
- 16 March – Dalziel and Pascoe (1996–2007)
- 2 April – Dennis the Menace (1996–1998)
- 5 April – Eskimo Day (1996)
- 6 April – Deep Secrets (1996)
- 7 April – Over Here (1996)
- 12 April – Little Mouse on the Prairie (1996)
- 17 April – Madson (1996)
- 28 April – Karaoke (1996)
- 2 May – Airport (1996–2005)
- 5 May – No Bananas (1996)
- 25 May – Full Swing (1996)
- 27 May – Doctor Who (1996)
- 16 June – A Royal Scandal (1996)
- 21 June
  - To Me... To You... (1996–1998)
  - Future Fantastic (1996)
- 21 July – The Writing on the Wall, called Operation Schmetterling in Germany (1996) (4 episodes)
- 5 August – The Alphabet Game (1996–1997)
- 24 August – The Bite (1996)
- 5 September
  - Little Bear (1995–1999)
  - The Hello Girls (1996–1998)
- 6 September – Muppets Tonight (1996–1998)
- 15 September – Rhodes (1996)
- 22 September – The Legacy of Reginald Perrin (1996)
- 24 September – Romuald the Reindeer (1996)
- 2 October – Beck (1996)
- 4 October – Satellite City (1996–1999)
- 6 October – Clive Anderson All Talk (1996–1999)
- 7 October – Ace Ventura: Pet Detective (1995–2000)
- 28 October – Billy Connolly's World Tour of Australia (1996)
- 3 November – Accused (1996)
- 10 November – The Prince and the Pauper (1996)
- 14 November – Crocodile Shoes II (1996)
- 17 November – The Tenant of Wildfell Hall (1996)
- 25 December – Brambly Hedge (1996–97)

=== BBC2 ===
- 15 January
  - Our Friends in the North (1996)
  - Look and Read: Spywatch (1996)
- 18 March – This Life (1996–1997)
- 21 April – A History of British Art (1996)
- 4 September – Changing Rooms (1996–2004)
- 12 September – Neverwhere (1996)
- 16 September – Megamaths (1996–2002)
- 27 September – All Rise for Julian Clary (1996–1997)
- 9 October – Two Fat Ladies (1996–1999)
- 24 October – 3rd Rock from the Sun (1996–2001)
- 4 November – The Crow Road (1996)
- 12 November – Never Mind the Buzzcocks (1996–2015)
- 23 November – The Simpsons (1989–present) (Terrestrial rights, initially on BBC1)
- 2 December – Wicked Women (1996) (Anthology: Brazen Hussies; King Girl; Giving Tongue)
- 22 December – Cruel Train (1996)
- 29 December – The Moonstone (1996)

=== ITV ===
- 2 January – Santo Bugito (1995)
- 3 January
  - Delta Wave (1996)
  - Potamus Park (1996–1999)
- 5 January
  - Bimble's Bucket (1996–1998)
  - The Tide of Life (1996)
- 8 January – Call Red (1996)
- 13 January – The Bare Necessities (1996)
- 26 January – Paul Merton in Galton and Simpson's... (1996–1997)
- 15 February – London Bridge (1996–1999)
- 16 February – The Girl (1996)
- 16 February – Carnal Knowledge (1996)
- 25 February – My Wonderful Life (1996–1999)
- 5 March – Married for Life (1996)
- 19 March – The Island (1996–1997)
- 4 April – Crazy Cottage (1996–1998)
- 10 April – Bodyguards (1996–1997)
- 13 April – Wake Up in the Wild Room (1996–1998)
- 15 April – The Big Bang (1996–2004)
- 1 May – The Adventures of Captain Zeelig (1996)
- 3 May – The Treacle People (1996–1997)
- 4 May – Man O Man (1996–1999)
- 7 May – Frontiers (1996)
- 10 June – An Independent Man (1996)
- 11 June – Gayle's World (1996–1997)
- 8 July – Red Amber Green (1996–1999)
- 27 July – The Big Big Talent Show (1996–1997)
- 31 July – Chatterhappy Ponies (1996–1998)
- 4 August – The English Wife
- 11 August – Some Kind of Life (1996)
- 16 August – Captain Simian & the Space Monkeys (1996–1997)
- 6 September – Barry Welsh Is Coming (1996–2004)
- 7 September
  - Professor Bubble (1996–1997)
  - Bug Alert (1996–2000)
- 10 September – Hey Arnold! (1996–2004)
- 11 September – Retrace (1996–1998)
- 12 September – It's a Mystery (1996–2002)
- 13 September – Roger and the Rottentrolls (1996–2000)
- 20 September
  - Oscar and Friends (1996)
  - The Adventures of Dawdle the Donkey (1996–1997)
- 30 September – Wilderness (1996)
- 1 October – Springhill (1996–1997)
- 2 October – Poldark (1996)
- 5 October – Mole in the Hole (1996)
- 29 October – Zot the Dog (1996–1997)
- 31 October – Frighteners (1996–1997)
- 1 November
  - Snug and Cozi (1996–1997)
  - Staying Alive (1996–1997)
- 7 November – Out of Sight (1996–1998)
- 9 November – Kiss and Tell (1996)
- 20 November – Matt's Million (1996)
- 23 November – Sabrina the Teenage Witch (1996–2003)
- 24 November – Emma (1996)
- 1 December – The Fortunes and Misfortunes of Moll Flanders (1996)
- 5 December – Hillsborough (1996)
- 17 December – Respect (1996)
- 25 December – Percy the Park Keeper (1996–1999)
- 31 December – Cuts (1996)

=== Channel 4 ===
- 5 January – Cybill (1995–1999)
- 1 February – Annie's Bar (1996)
- 9 February – TFI Friday (1996–2000)
- 23 February – The Mark Thomas Comedy Product (1996–2003)
- 19 March – And the Beat Goes On (1996)
- 6 April – Insektors (1994–1995)
- 17 May – Life After Birth (1996)
- 26 May – Cold Lazarus (1996)
- 5 June – American Gothic (1995–1996)
- 20 September – Caroline in the City (1995–1999)
- 2 October – Aaahh!!! Real Monsters (1994–1997)
- 30 October – Wanted (1996–1997)
- 6 November – The Fragile Heart (1996)
- 6 December – The Adam and Joe Show (1996–2001)
- 13 December – Family Money (1996–1997)
- 24 December
  - The Adventures of Toad (1996)
  - Famous Fred (1996)

=== Sky One/1 ===
- 7 January – Murder One (1995–1996)
- 20 January – Sliders (1995–2000)
- 9 June – The Feds (1993–1996)
- 8 September – The Beast (1996)
- 1 October – Springhill (1996–1997)
- 22 December – Millennium (1996–1999)
- Unknown
  - What-a-Mess (Series 3) (1995–1996)
  - Ned and Stacey (1995–1997)

=== Sky 2 ===
- 2 September – Water Rats (1996–2001)

=== Fox Kids UK ===
- 19 October – Billy the Cat (1996–2001)

=== Disney Channel UK ===
- 21 October
  - Brand Spankin' New! Doug (1996–1999)
  - Mighty Ducks (1996–1997)
- Unknown – Sing Me a Story with Belle (1995–1996)

=== Cartoon Network UK ===
- 2 September – Dexter's Laboratory (1996–2003)
- Unknown
  - Omer and the Starchild (1992)
  - Monchhichis (1983)

=== Nickelodeon UK ===
- 6 January – CBBC on Nickelodeon (1996–1999)
- Unknown – Bruno the Kid (1996–1997)

== Channels ==
=== New channels ===
Date	Channel
11 March	CNBC Europe
16 March	Sky Box Office
16 August	Sky Sports 3
1 September	The Computer Channel
1 September	Sky 2
1 September	The Weather Channel
2 September	Carlton Food Network
1 October	Granada Good Life
1 October	Granada Men & Motors
1 October	Granada Plus
1 October	Granada Talk TV
19 October	Fox Kids
24 October	ONTV (CableTel (UK) ltd) (Trademark Information)
1 November	Sky Scottish

=== Defunct channels ===
Date	Channel
16 August	Sky Sports Gold

=== Rebranded channels ===
Date	Old Name	New Name
1 September	Sky One	Sky 1
9 September	NBC Super Channel	NBC Europe

== Television shows ==
=== Changes of network affiliation ===
Shows	Moved from	Moved to
Oscar's Orchestra	BBC1	The Children's Channel
Dennis the Menace	BBC1	The Children's Channel
X-Men	BBC1	Fox Kids
Santo Bugito	ITV	Nickelodeon
Hey Arnold!	ITV	Nickelodeon
Sabrina the Teenage Witch	ITV	Disney Channel
Thomas The Tank Engine & Friends	ITV	Cartoon Network
Earthworm Jim	The Children's Channel	Channel 4
The Magic School Bus	Nickelodeon	Channel 4
The Ferals	Nickelodeon	Channel 4

=== Returning this year after a break of one year or longer ===
- 4 March – The Wombles (1973–1975, 1990–1991 BBC, 1996–1997 ITV)
- 10 April – The Two Ronnies for a 25th Anniversary special (1971–1987, 1991, 1996, 2005)
- 6 May – The Liver Birds (1969–1979, 1996)
- 13 May – Call My Bluff (1965–1988, 1996–2005)
- 27 May – Doctor Who (1963–1989, 1996, 2005–present)

== Continuing television shows ==
=== 1920s ===
- BBC Wimbledon (1927–1939, 1946–2019, 2021–present)

=== 1930s ===
- Trooping the Colour (1937–1939, 1946–2019, 2023–present)
- The Boat Race (1938–1939, 1946–2019, 2021–present)
- BBC Cricket (1939, 1946–1999, 2020–2024)

=== 1940s ===
- Come Dancing (1949–1998)

=== 1950s ===
- Panorama (1953–present)
- Take Your Pick! (1955–1968, 1992–1998)
- What the Papers Say (1956–2008)
- The Sky at Night (1957–present)
- Blue Peter (1958–present)
- Grandstand (1958–2007)

=== 1960s ===
- Coronation Street (1960–present)
- Songs of Praise (1961–present)
- World in Action (1963–1998)
- Top of the Pops (1964–2006)
- Match of the Day (1964–present)
- Mr. and Mrs. (1965–1999)
- Sportsnight (1965–1997)
- Call My Bluff (1965–2005)
- The Money Programme (1966–2010)

=== 1970s ===
- Rainbow (1972–1992, 1994–1997)
- Emmerdale (1972–present)
- Newsround (1972–present)
- Last of the Summer Wine (1973–2010)
- Wish You Were Here...? (1974–2003)
- Arena (1975–present)
- One Man and His Dog (1976–present)
- Grange Hill (1978–2008)
- Ski Sunday (1978–present)
- Antiques Roadshow (1979–present)
- Question Time (1979–present)

=== 1980s ===
- Play Your Cards Right (1980–1987, 1994–1999, 2002–2003)
- Family Fortunes (1980–2002, 2006–2015, 2020–present)
- Children in Need (1980–present)
- Timewatch (1982–present)
- Brookside (1982–2003)
- Countdown (1982–present)
- Right to Reply (1982–2001)
- Surprise Surprise (1984–2001, 2012–2015)
- The Bill (1984–2010)
- Channel 4 Racing (1984–2016)
- Thomas & Friends (1984–2021)
- EastEnders (1985–present)
- The Cook Report (1987–1999)
- Crosswits (1985–1998)
- Screen Two (1985–1998)
- Telly Addicts (1985–1998)
- Blind Date (1985–2003, 2017–2019)
- Comic Relief (1985–present)
- The Chart Show (1986–1998, 2008–2009)
- Equinox (1986–2006)
- The Really Wild Show (1986–2006)
- Casualty (1986–present)
- Chain Letters (1987–1997)
- The Time, The Place (1987–1998)
- ChuckleVision (1987–2009)
- You Bet! (1988–1997)
- Playdays (1988–1997)
- Wheel of Fortune (1988–2001)
- London's Burning (1988–2002)
- On the Record (1988–2002)
- Fifteen to One (1988–2003, 2013–2019)
- This Morning (1988–present)
- Children's Ward (1989–2000)
- Mike and Angelo (1989–2000)
- Birds of a Feather (1989–1998, 2014–2020)
- Bodger & Badger (1989–1999)

=== 1990s ===
- Drop the Dead Donkey (1990–1998)
- One Foot in the Grave (1990–2000)
- Rosie and Jim (1990–2000)
- MasterChef (1990–2001, 2005–present)
- How 2 (1990–2006)
- Stars in Their Eyes (1990–2006, 2015)
- 2point4 Children (1991–1999)
- Big Break (1991–2002)
- The Brittas Empire (1991–1997)
- Soldier Soldier (1991–1997)
- Noel's House Party (1991–1999)
- GamesMaster (1992–1998)
- Heartbeat (1992–2010)
- Men Behaving Badly (1992–1998)
- The Big Breakfast (1992–2002)
- 999 (1992–2003)
- Sooty & Co. (1993–1998)
- Mr. Motivator exercise routines (1993–2000)
- Breakfast with Frost (1993–2005)
- Ky’s Cartoons (1994–1999)
- Animal Hospital (1994–2004)
- The National Lottery Draws (1994–2017)
- Time Team (1994–2013)
- The Vicar of Dibley (1994–2007)
- Wipeout (1994–2003)
- Frasier (1993–2004)
- Wycliffe (1994–1998)
- Top of the Pops 2 (1994–present)
- Oh, Doctor Beeching! (1995–1997)
- Father Ted (1995–1998)
- Hollyoaks (1995–present)
- Is It Legal? (1995–1998)

== Ending this year ==
- Jackanory (1965–1996, 2006)
- Pebble Mill (1971–1986, 1991–1996)
- Finders Keepers (1991–1996, 2006)
- Only Fools and Horses (1981–1996, 2001–2003, 2014)
- Spitting Image (1984–1996)
- Beadle's About (1986–1996)
- Going for Gold (1987–1996, 2008–2009)
- That's Showbusiness (1989–1996)
- Turnabout (1990–1996)
- The Upper Hand (1990–1996)
- Bitsa (1991–1996)
- Garden Club (1991–1996)
- Absolutely Fabulous (1992–1996, 2001–2004, 2011–2012)
- Good Morning with Anne and Nick (1992–1996)
- Brill (1992–1996)
- Chef! (1993–1996)
- Doctor Finlay (1993–1996)
- Jo Brand Through the Cakehole (1993–1996)
- Saturday Disney (1993–1996)
- The Good Sex Guide (1993–1996)
- Body Heat (1994–1996)
- The Magic House (1994–1996)
- Budgie the Little Helicopter (1994–1996)
- Terror Towers (1994–1996)
- Dino Babies (1994–1996)
- Pets Win Prizes (1994–1996)
- Small Talk (1994–1996)
- Bad Boys (1995–1996)
- God's Gift (1995–1996)
- Out of the Blue (1995–1996)
- Raise the Roof (1995–1996)
- The Thin Blue Line (1995–1996)
- The Beatles Anthology (1995–1996)
- Call Red (1996)
- And the Beat Goes On (1996)
- Full Swing (1996)
- Our Friends in the North (1996)
- Rhodes (1996)
- The Fragile Heart (1996)
- The Tenant of Wildfell Hall (1996)
- The Moonstone (1996)
- The Sculptress (1996)

== Births ==
- 3 January – Florence Pugh, actress
- 26 January – Tyger Drew-Honey, actor and presenter
- 21 February – Sophie Turner, actress and model
- 23 April – Charlie Rowe
- 1 June – Tom Holland, actor
- 21 July – Anya Chalotra, actress
- 30 July – Synnøve Karlsen, actress
- 17 September – Ella Purnell, actress
- 25 October – Georgia Lock, actress and presenter

== Deaths ==
Date	Name	Age	Cinematic Credibility
17 January	Harry Robertson	63	television musical director
6 February	Renee Roberts	87	actress (Miss Gatsby in Fawlty Towers)
6 February	Patsy Smart	77	actress (Upstairs, Downstairs)
15 February	Margaret Courtenay	72	actress
19 February	Brenda Bruce	72	actress (Jeeves and Wooster)
6 March	Simon Cadell	45	actor (Hi-de-Hi!)
4 April	Winifred Shotter	91	television presenter
24 April	Preston Lockwood	83	actor
11 May	Joan Thirkettle	48	television journalist for ITN
19 May	Margaret Rawlings	89	actress
20 May	Jon Pertwee	76	actor (Doctor Who, Worzel Gummidge and voice of Spotty in SuperTed)
23 May	Patrick Cargill	77	actor (Father, Dear Father)
29 May	Jeremy Sinden	45	actor
7 June	Percy Edwards	88	voice actor
1 July	Alfred Marks	75	TV comedian
21 July	Wolfe Morris	71	actor
29 July	Hilary Pritchard	54	actress (Crossroads, Whoops Baghdad!)
7 August	Anne Kristen	59	actress (Olive Rowe in Coronation Street)
10 August	Rex Tucker	83	television director
13 September	Jane Baxter	87	actress
24 September	Mark Frankel	34	actor
29 September	Leslie Crowther	63	British TV comedian and game show host (Crackerjack, The Price Is Right and Stars in Their Eyes)
13 October	Beryl Reid	77	actress
21 October	Eric Halsall	76	television presenter
26 October	Tricia Ingrams	50	journalist and presenter for Thames Television
26 November	Michael Bentine	74	comedian, comic actor, and founding member of The Goons
9 December	Diana Morgan	88	television screenwriter
11 December	Willie Rushton	59	comedian, satirist, cartoonist and writer
19 December	Ronald Howard	78	actor

== See also ==
- 1996 in British music
- 1996 in British radio
- 1996 in the United Kingdom
- List of British films of 1996
