= 1996 in British radio =

This is a list of events in British radio during 1996.

== Events ==
=== January ===
- No events.

=== February ===
- 4 February – Trevor Nelson joins BBC Radio 1 to present the UK's first national R&B show Rhythm Nation.
- 5 February – Radio Wyvern becomes the last commercial radio station in England to end simulcasting on FM and AM.

=== March ===
- 15 March – Alan Freeman joins Virgin Radio to present a new Friday night rock show.
- 18 March – Mike Read replaces Nick Bailey as host of Classic FM’s breakfast show.
- 30 March – Steve Wright joins BBC Radio 2.
- 31 March – Michael Parkinson begins presenting Parkinson's Sunday Supplement on Radio 2.
- Undated in March
  - Jim Moir replaces Frances Line as controller of BBC Radio 2 and begins repositioning the station to attract a wider audience of over 35s, many of whom have moved to commercial radio following the repositioning of BBC Radio 1 three years earlier. He introduces a daytime playlist consisting of AOR/contemporary music with specialist programmes airing during the evening and at the weekend. Nostalgic/easy listening music is restricted to Sundays only.
  - BBC Dorset FM closes and is replaced by a rebroadcast of BBC Radio Solent with localised news bulletins.
  - Allied Radio plc is taken over by Independent Radio Group plc.

=== April ===
- 1 April – Network News closes.
- 3 April – After 18 years, the name BBC Radio Manchester returns to the airwaves. Since 1988 the station had been called BBC GMR. Shortly after the namechange, the station opens a relay on 104.6 FM to give areas of the Upper Tame Valley, including Saddleworth, Tameside and down to Hyde, improved coverage.
- 5–8 April – Classic FM broadcasts its first Hall of Fame over the Easter weekend.
- 9 April – BBC Radio Oxford and BBC Radio Berkshire are merged to form BBC Thames Valley FM.

=== May ===
- 4 May – BBC Radio 3 commences 24-hour transmission.
- Undated in May – Viva 963 is sold to Mohammed Al Fayed, owner of Harrods and chairman of Fulham Football Club, who renames the station as Liberty Radio.

=== June ===
- Undated in June
  - Radio 1 starts live streaming on the internet.
  - Schools programmes are broadcast during the day for the final time. Schools programmes continued to be broadcast overnight until 2003.

=== July ===
- 1 July – The LBC name returns to London's airwaves following a rebrand of London News Radio's MW station News Talk 1152.
- 9 July – The Radio Authority receives 25 bids for the final FM citywide London licence. In November the Authority announces that XFM has been awarded the licence which will broadcast on 104.9.

=== August ===
- Undated in August
  - Hallam FM switches off its transmitter covering Rotherham as part of its licence agreement.
  - Minster FM extends northwards when it switches on a transmitter covering Thirsk and Northallerton.

=== September ===
- 9 September – Following a change in ownership, Manchester station Fortune 1458 is relaunched as Lite AM.
- 27 September – Paul Gambaccini leaves BBC Radio 3 after less than a year with the station.
- 30 September – Belfast Community Radio closes and is replaced by CityBeat.
- Undated in September
  - Scottish Radio Holdings purchases Northern Ireland stations Downtown Radio and Cool FM.
  - The Radio Authority awards a full-time commercial licence to a student radio station for the first time when it awards the Oxford licence to Oxygen FM.

=== October ===
- 9 October – BBC Radio 1's London studios move from Egton House to Yalding House.
- Undated in October – Richard Skinner, who presented the first show on Virgin Radio, leaves.

=== November ===
- 4 November – The Asian Network expands into a full-time station when it increases the number of hours on air from 80 hours a week to 126 hours a week (18 hours a day). The station, which broadcasts on the MW frequencies of BBC Radio Leicester and BBC Radio WM, is renamed BBC Asian Network.
- 14 November – London News relaunches its rolling news service as News Direct 97.3.

=== December ===
- 20 December – Steve Penk leaves Key 103 to move to Capital FM after 18 years at the Manchester station.

=== Unknown ===
- Matthew Bannister becomes Director of BBC Radio.
- Following its purchase of Bedford station Chiltern 96.9, new owners GWR Group rebrand the station as B97 FM.

== Station debuts ==
- 5 February – Wyvern FM and Wyvern AM
- Spring – Burn FM
- 4 April – 96.4 The Eagle
- 9 April – BBC Thames Valley FM
- 21 April – Spirit FM
- 24 May – FM102 The Bear
- 3 June – Asian Sound Radio
- 15 July – Oban FM
- 29 September – The Beach
- 23 November – Valleys Radio
- Unknown date – Fly Live

== Programme debuts ==
- 31 March – Parkinson's Sunday Supplement on BBC Radio 2 (1996–2007)
- 17 April – Chambers on BBC Radio 4 (1996–1999)
- 5 July – Goodness Gracious Me on BBC Radio 4 (1996–1998)
- 26 July – Comedy Quiz on BBC Radio 4 (1996–1997)
- 4 August – Independence Day UK on BBC Radio 1 (1996)
- 6 October – The David Jacobs Collection on BBC Radio 2 (1996–2013)

== Continuing radio programmes ==
=== 1940s ===
- Sunday Half Hour (1940–2018)
- Desert Island Discs (1942–Present)
- Letter from America (1946–2004)
- Woman's Hour (1946–Present)
- A Book at Bedtime (1949–Present)

=== 1950s ===
- The Archers (1950–Present)
- The Today Programme (1957–Present)
- Sing Something Simple (1959–2001)
- Your Hundred Best Tunes (1959–2007)

=== 1960s ===
- Farming Today (1960–Present)
- In Touch (1961–Present)
- The World at One (1965–Present)
- The Official Chart (1967–Present)
- Just a Minute (1967–Present)
- The Living World (1968–Present)
- The Organist Entertains (1969–2018)

=== 1970s ===
- PM (1970–Present)
- Start the Week (1970–Present)
- Week Ending (1970–1998)
- You and Yours (1970–Present)
- I'm Sorry I Haven't a Clue (1972–Present)
- Good Morning Scotland (1973–Present)
- Kaleidoscope (1973–1998)
- Newsbeat (1973–Present)
- The News Huddlines (1975–2001)
- File on 4 (1977–Present)
- Money Box (1977–Present)
- The News Quiz (1977–Present)
- Breakaway (1979–1998)
- Feedback (1979–Present)
- The Food Programme (1979–Present)
- Science in Action (1979–Present)

=== 1980s ===
- In Business (1983–Present)
- Sounds of the 60s (1983–Present)
- Loose Ends (1986–Present)

=== 1990s ===
- The Moral Maze (1990–Present)
- Essential Selection (1991–Present)
- No Commitments (1992–2007)
- Harry Hill's Fruit Corner (1993–1997)
- The Pepsi Chart (1993–2002)
- Wake Up to Wogan (1993–2009)
- Essential Mix (1993–Present)
- Up All Night (1994–Present)
- Wake Up to Money (1994–Present)
- Collins and Maconie's Hit Parade (1994–1997)
- Julie Enfield Investigates (1994–1999)
- Private Passions (1995–Present)

== Ending this year ==
- January – Change at Oglethorpe (1995–1996)
- September – The Mark Steel Solution (1992–1996)

== Closing this year ==
- 9 April –
  - BBC Radio Berkshire (1992–1996)
  - BBC Radio Oxford (1970–1996)
- 1 September – Supergold (1988–1996)

== Deaths ==
- 10 January ‒ Dennis McCarthy, 62, radio presenter
- 26 March – John Snagge, 91, newsreader
- 6 April – Gordon Clough, 61, radio journalist
- 29 April – David Davis, 87, radio executive and broadcaster
- 11 May – Joan Thirkettle, 48, television journalist and radio personality
- 7 June – Percy Edwards, 88, animal impersonator
- 19 June – Vivian Ellis, 92, theme tune composer (My Word, Paul Temple)
- 11 December – Willie Rushton, 59, comic performer, broadcast personality and cartoonist
- 14 December – Norman Hackforth, 87, musical accompanist and radio "mystery voice"

== See also ==
- 1996 in British music
- 1996 in British television
- 1996 in the United Kingdom
- List of British films of 1996
