= Sarah Cullen =

British journalist

- Born: 6 October 1949; Newcastle upon Tyne, United Kingdom
- Died: 22 January 2012 (aged 62); Exeter, Devon, United Kingdom
- Education: University College London
- Occupations: Radio and television journalist
- Notable credit(s): ITN (1972–1991); Today (1994–1998)
- Spouse: Kieran Devaney (1986–1998)
- Children: 1

Sarah Cullen (6 October 1949 – 22 January 2012) was a British radio and television journalist who worked for ITN, as well as BBC Radio 4's Today programme. Remembered for her red hair and volatile temperament, Cullen forged a reputation for reporting from the street, and undertook many assignments in Northern Ireland, including covering events during the closing days of The Troubles.

== Life and career ==
Born in Newcastle upon Tyne, Cullen's father was the manager of a quarry in County Durham while her mother taught mathematics at a teacher training college. Her grandfather was John Bradley, editor of the Scottish Catholic Herald. She was educated at the Sisters of Notre Dame convent school, a boarding school in Southport, before studying for A-levels at a sixth form college in Cambridge. She was a student at University College London from 1968 to 1972, graduating with a BA degree in English. She interrupted her studies from 1970 to 1971 to take a paid sabbatical year as editor of the University of London student newspaper then titled Sennet. Cullen joined ITN as a graduate trainee in 1972.

After being sent for a brief period to the Liverpool Daily Post, she worked as a scriptwriter and desk editor for the broadcaster, before auditioning as an on-screen reporter. She was one of ITN's first female reporters along with Carol Barnes, Joan Thirkettle and Sue Lloyd-Roberts, and was appointed their Home Affairs Correspondent in 1983. On one occasion, her reporting was teased in a review for The Observer by Clive James: "'Each school will have to raise the cost of their computer,' announced Sarah Cullen on News at Ten ... Each channel will have to clean up their grammar: this is getting ridiculous."

After being made redundant from ITN in 1991 she moved to radio, freelancing for Radio 4's PM, and was the recipient of a Bronze Sony Radio Academy Award as News Reporter of the Year in 1994. She joined the morning Today programme in 1994. During her career she developed a talent for getting the so-called "real voices" of people onto radio and television through her news reports, going out into the street to interview members of the public. Often she would be sent out to gauge opinion on issues of government policy, where she would seek out those who were most likely to be affected by a particular decision.

She was also sent to Belfast on many occasions to cover issues relating to The Troubles, and would employ the same news gathering technique, often venturing into so-called "no-go" areas of the city to speak to ordinary people caught up in the conflict. During one late-night visit to Belfast she was seized by members of the Provisional IRA who had heard she had been interviewing locals on the Falls Road. On that occasion she was ordered to telephone a senior editorial manager in London because the group's commander was unconvinced by her BBC credentials. Stephen Mitchell later recalled the telephone call: "Before I had fully woken up a man with a very strong Irish accent was explaining that he was with the Provisionals, that he and I had met years before when I was working in Belfast, and he was demanding to know whether I could vouch for this 'mad woman’ who had been found talking to people on the Falls Road in the middle of the night and who was claiming to be from the BBC." Mitchell verified her identity to which the IRA man replied: "Thank God, we can let her go. I was afraid we would have had to keep her and she’s terrifying."

For another series of news reports she went to Glasgow to investigate the city's illegal drug trade, and gathered her material by befriending a young woman who was a drug addict. After spending almost a week working undercover she helped the woman through the rehabilitation process.

Cullen left the BBC after being diagnosed with ovarian cancer in 1998, and undergoing chemotherapy. She suffered further health problems later in life. Her memoirs of her early days at ITN, In Praise of Panic were published in 1982.

== Personal life ==
Cullen married fellow journalist Kieran Devaney in 1986. The couple had a son, Tom, and the marriage was dissolved in 1998.
