= Rizwan Khan =

British broadcaster, journalist and author (born 1962)

Riz Khan
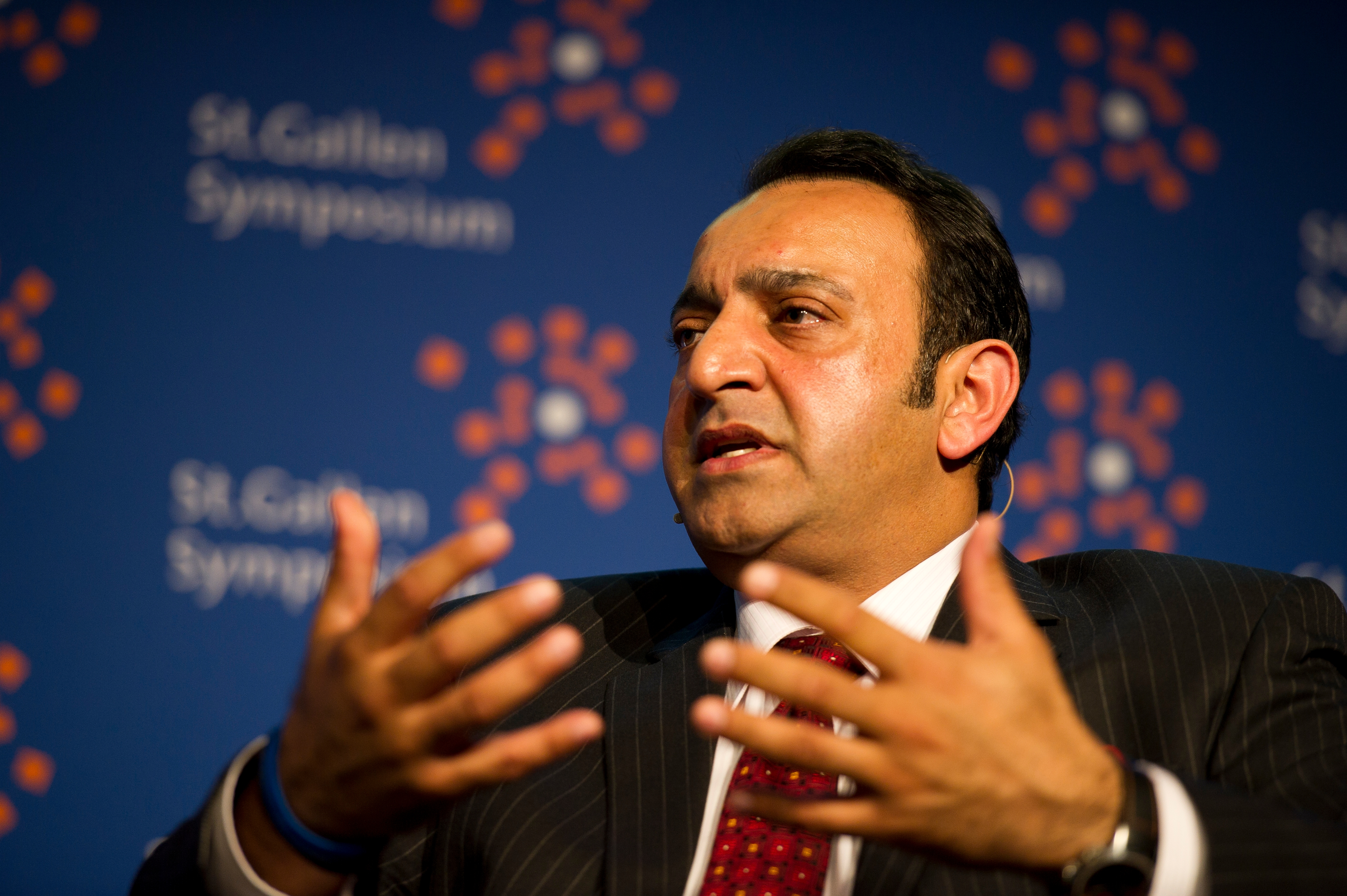
- Khan in 2011
- Born: Rizwan Ahmad Khan; 1 April 1962 (age 64); Aden Colony, Yemen
- Education: University of Wales (BSc)
- Occupations: Journalist, Author, TV Host
- Years active: 1986–present
- Website: Official website

Rizwan Ahmad Khan (born 1962) is a British broadcaster, journalist and author. He is known for presenting international news and current-affairs programmes, including Q&A with Riz Khan on CNN. In 2003, he hosted Pakistan's first English-language talk show, International Questions (IQ), on ARY News.Then From 2006 until April 2011 he hosted his own eponymous television show on Al Jazeera English. He first rose to prominence while working for the BBC CNN ARY Al Jazeera & Al Arabiya.

== Early life ==
Riz Khan was born on 1 April 1962 in the British colony of Aden (now part of the Republic of Yemen), to a Pakistani Punjabi Muslim family. His father was born in Amritsar, British India, and migrated to Lahore during the partition. Khan's mother was born in Mukalla, in British-controlled Yemen, but her family roots go back to Kathiawar, Gujarat, in India.

At the age of four, Khan moved with his family to London, during the Aden Emergency, an armed civil conflict that saw the end of British rule in Aden. His parents divorced when he was six and he was estranged from his father from the age of 21.

Khan grew up in the West London suburb of Hounslow and attended Springwell Junior School followed by Hounslow Manor Comprehensive School during which time he joined the 86th Squadron, Heston & Isleworth Air Training Corps cadets.

He graduated with a Bachelor of Science with Honours in Medical Physiology from the University of Wales in Cardiff in 1984, and then took a postgraduate course in Radio Journalism at Highbury College near Portsmouth before beginning his career in BBC local radio in 1985.

== Broadcasting career ==
Khan has been identified as the first mainstream BBC and CNN newscaster of South Asian origin.

In 1987, he was selected for the BBC News Trainee scheme - a highly competitive two-year BBC programme, usually taking only 12 recruits annually. Khan progressed to jobs as a BBC writer, producer and reporter, working in both television and radio, and later became one of the founding News Presenters on BBC World Service Television News (now BBC World). With former ITN newscaster, Pamela Armstrong, Khan co-hosted the news bulletin that launched BBC World in 1991.

He was recruited to join CNN in May 1993, as the American channel prepared to launch CNN International as a sister network to its US channel. At CNN-I, Khan became a senior anchor and reporter for the network's global news shows, covering events that included the 1996 and 1999 coverage of elections in India; the 1997 historic election in Britain; and in April 1998 the unprecedented live coverage from the Muslim pilgrimage, the Hajj, in Mecca (Makkah), Saudi Arabia.

In 1996 he launched his interactive, live, daily interview show on CNN: Q&A with Riz Khan, conducting discussions on a diverse range on topics and featuring leading global figure including former UN Secretary General Kofi Annan, former US Presidents Jimmy Carter and Bill Clinton; the Dalai Lama, Nelson Mandela, physicist Stephen Hawking, genomic scientist J. Craig Venter and others. Khan also secured the world exclusive interview with Pakistan's General Pervez Musharraf following his coup in October 1999. An additional daily, live show Q&A-Asia with Riz Khan, was soon launched to serve audiences across the Asian continent. Both interactive shows put world newsmakers and celebrities up for viewer questions live by phone, e-mail, video-mail, and fax, along with questions and comments taken from the real-time chatroom that opened prior to each show.

In 2003, Riz Khan joined ARY News, where he launched and hosted International Questions (IQ), the channel's first English-language talk show. The programme featured interviews and discussions on international affairs, politics and current events, and was hosted by Riz Khan.

In 2004, Khan was approached to help launch an English-language channel for the Al Jazeera Network whose headquarters are based in Doha, Qatar. Khan began recruiting for it prior to its launch in November 2006 and conducted his shows primarily from Washington, D.C.

From 2006 until April 2011, Khan had his own eponymous Programme on Al Jazeera English, in which he interviewed top global figures and celebrities, as well as analysts and policymakers to discuss leading news topics. The Riz Khan show invited viewers to interact with his guests via phone, email, and SMS texts.

At the same time, he also launched 'One on One with Riz Khan', a weekly show featuring well-known and accomplished names talking about their life stories, including family history and defining moments. The show featured an international list of names that included Richard Branson, Gore Vidal, Kareem Abdul Jabbar, Terry Waite, Antonio Banderas, Shah Rukh Khan, Gilberto Gil, Ellen Johnson Sirleaf, and Peter Gabriel, among others.

== Other work ==
In 2016, Khan founded and launched a sustainable clothing brand that supports rhino conservation. Named hornï - from the anagram of rhino - it is primarily focused on premium underwear. hornï has a close relationship with Save The Rhino International, based in the UK, and also works with Wild Tomorrow Fund in the USA.

In 2005 he authored his first book, Al-Waleed : Businessman Billionaire Prince, published by HarperCollins.

In 2011 he authored a preface for the Committee to Protect Journalists (CPJ) annual report "Attacks on the Press 2010", which examined working conditions for journalists in more than 100 countries.

His first novel, We Interrupt Our Programming…, was e-published in 2012 and takes a candid and satirical look at the world of international news.

Khan can speak Urdu and also has a basic understanding of some other South Asian languages such as Punjabi and Kutchi. He has studied French, and has some conversational Swedish.
