= Tarby's Frame Game =

- Genre: Game show
- Presented by: Jimmy Tarbuck
- Starring: Sharon Moulden
- Voices of: Tony Schaeffer
- Country of origin: United Kingdom
- Original language: English
- No. of series: 3
- No. of episodes: 36

Production
- Running time: 30 minutes (inc. adverts)
- Production companies: Yorkshire Television in association with Bernstein/Hovis Productions, Columbia Pictures Television and Action Time

Original release
- Network: ITV
- Release: 24 May 1987 – 7 July 1989

Tarby's Frame Game is a British game show that aired on ITV from 24 May 1987 to 29 July 1989 and hosted by Jimmy Tarbuck. It was based on a 1984 unsold pilot in the United States called It, produced by Bernstein-Hovis productions, and hosted by Gene Rayburn

== Premise ==
Two teams of couples try to solve a series of three-word puzzles called frames. A frame is two words with a linking word missing in between. The object of the game is to guess a word that is the missing link between the two words.

Example: LITTLE-<<BLANK>>-SIMMONS Answer: "Richard" - LITTLE-RICHARD-SIMMONS

== Gameplay ==
In each round, the couples were shown up to three frames each worth a decreasing number of points. The first was worth 30 points, the second was worth 20 points, and the last was worth 10 points. As soon as a couple knows the word they can buzz-in, if they're right, they score the points attached to the frame, if they're wrong or if nobody knows however, another frame with the same missing link was shown. An unlimited number of frames were played according to time.

The losing couples went away with a portable colour television.

Two new couples competed in the first two rounds with the winners of each round playing the super final round for the right to play the bonus round for big prizes.

In series 2 the format was changed where 3 couples competed in 2 rounds instead of the 2 heats and at the end of the 2 rounds the couple with the lowest score was eliminated while the 2 remaining couples played each other for the right to play for the big prizes.

=== Final Round ===
In the final round, while one member of the winning couple was isolated, the other was shown five middle words, and constructed a frame for each word by giving two connecting words before & after each word. When the giving player was finished, the guessing player returned and had 45 seconds within which to complete the frames. Solving all five won a grand prize, but failure won an increasing consolation prize.

== Transmissions ==
Series	Start date	End date	Episodes
1	24 May 1987	23 August 1987	15
2	28 May 1988	27 August 1988	14
3	26 May 1989	7 July 1989	7
