= Carla's Song =

- UK theatrical release poster
- Directed by: Ken Loach
- Written by: Paul Laverty
- Produced by: Sally Hibbin
- Starring: Robert Carlyle, Oyanka Cabezas, Scott Glenn
- Narrated by: Stephen Fry
- Cinematography: Barry Ackroyd
- Edited by: Jonathan Morris
- Music by: George Fenton
- Production companies: Channel 4 Films; Scottish Television; Flextech
- Distributed by: PolyGram Filmed Entertainment
- Release dates: 20 September 1996 (Spain); 31 January 1997 (UK)
- Running time: 126 minutes
- Countries: United Kingdom; Spain; Germany
- Language: English

Carla's Song is a 1996 film directed by Ken Loach and written by Paul Laverty, that deals with the impact of the Contra War in Nicaragua. It is a United Kingdom–Spain–Germany co-production.

== Plot ==
Set in 1987, Carla's Song tells the story of love in a time of war. The plot follows the relationship between a Scottish bus driver, George Lennox (Robert Carlyle) and Carla (Oyanka Cabezas), a Nicaraguan refugee living in Glasgow. George first encounters Carla when she sneaks onto his bus without paying the fare. They go out for coffee but Carla seems hesitant to tell George anything about her life or where she's from. When Carla needs a place to stay George arranges for her to stay at his friend's place.

Later George returns to his friend's flat and finds Carla in the bathtub where she has slit her wrists. George takes her to the hospital where he learns that Carla also attempted suicide six weeks ago. George stays by Carla's side in the hospital while she is recovering.

Carla later explains that she read letters from her boyfriend, Antonio (Richard Loza), which she had never been able to open before. She was so horrified by the content of the letters that she tried to take her own life. Carla tells him that she doesn't know what happened to her boyfriend Antonio or to her family and asks George to hold her. She appears to be haunted by her past and suffering the effects of posttraumatic stress disorder.

George decides they need to return to a war-torn Nicaragua to find out what happened to Antonio and Carla's family. George begins to learn and about the U.S.-sponsored Contra insurgency against the Sandinistas. When they return to Nicaragua, they find Bradley, a U.S. citizen who is working as an aid worker and helping other U.S. citizens document human rights abuses conducted by the Contras. Bradley claims that he doesn't know the whereabouts of Carla's boyfriend and says that he will be heading North soon and that Carla should join him.

While Carla and George are taking a truck to the North of the country, the truck engine overheats and explodes in a burst of steam making a sound resembling gunfire. Carla completely breaks down and becomes catatonic when she hears this, and George tries to comfort her. Bradley happens by in a 4x4 and offers to take them off the truck and give them a ride while attempting to calm Carla down.

Bradley later admits that Antonio has been staying with him. Carla tells Bradley that he needs to let go of his past, which he seems to be struggling with also. Carla has terrible night horrors where she relives the experience of being in the revolution and their group being attacked by the Contras. In the nightmare, Carla is shot in the back several times yet manages to flee while the Contras descend on Antonio who falls after being shot. Carla's watches on in horror from some bushes.

On the way to Carla's family, a group of Sandinistas warns them that there are Contra fighters in the area. Carla finds her family and introduces George to them. Later that night, heavily armed Contras attack the village. The Contras kill many people and huge explosions go off around the village, while Sandinista villagers return fire.

In the morning George discovers that Carla and Antonio have a baby daughter. George asks Carla to return to Glasgow with him and bring the baby, but Carla refuses. George meets Bradley who seems absolutely incensed. Bradley explains that the Contras, who are operating out of Honduras, are a CIA-organized and funded group. Bradley then explains how Antonio was captured by the Contras, who used CIA torture methods. The Contras cut out Antonio's tongue, broke his spine in several places with rifle butts leaving him paralysed, and poured acid on his face, all while Carla watched from her hiding place in the bushes.

George breaks down when he hears what Carla has suffered through and runs to find her. George finds Carla's family who gives him a letter which Carla left for him. The letter says that Carla is heading north to find Antonio, and implies she may try to take her own life again. George steals a bus and Bradley joins him to help find Carla. They head to Bradley's village and find Carla in a room curled up and terrified of reuniting with Antonio. George encourages her to visit Antonio and explains that she will have to do this alone, that he can't do it with her.

Antonio is sitting on a stool in Bradley's house, a guitar in hand. Antonio's face is severely disfigured from the acid mutilation. Antonio reaches out to Carla and begins to play his guitar. Carla tearfully sings her song in accompaniment with the guitar. George prepares to return to Glasgow the next day, having found closure as both he and Carla keep one another in their hearts.

== Cast ==
- Robert Carlyle as George Lennox
- Oyanka Cabezas as Carla
- Scott Glenn as Bradley
- Salvador Espinoza as Rafael
- Louise Goodall as Maureen
- Richard Loza as Antonio
- Gary Lewis as Sammy

== Soundtrack ==
- Your Song - Written by Elton John and Bernie Taupin
- Miss You Nights - Written by Pete Townshend
- Quién es esa chavala - Written by Carlos Mejía
- Vientos del pueblo - Written by Víctor Jara
- El gigante que despierta - Written by Luis Enrique Mejía Godoy
- Aquella indita - Traditional marimba melody
- La consigna - Written by Carlos Mejía
- Cuando venga la paz - Written by Allan Bolt and Carlos Mejía
- Canción urgente para Nicaragua - Written by Silvio Rodríguez
- Cumbia chinandegana - Written by Jorge Paladino
- The Magnificent Seven - Composed by Elmer Bernstein
- Oh Read (Palo de mayo) - Traditional song
- Guerrero del amor - Written by Rossy Soley and Salvador Cardenal

== Reception ==
On Rotten Tomatoes the film has an approval rating of 88% based on reviews from 8 critics, with an average rating of 6.9 out of 10.

The film opened with a gross of £71,968 in the UK from 42 screens in its opening weekend.

=== Accolades ===
The film was nominated for both the Alexander Korda Award for Best British Film at the 1997 BAFTA Awards and for Best Feature Film at the 1997 BAFTA Awards, Scotland. Ken Loach won the President of the Italian Senate's Gold Medal at the 1996 Venice Film Festival. The film also won the Coral Award for Best Work of a Non-Latin American Director on a Latin America Subject at the 1996 Havana Film Festival. In 1998 Robert Carlyle won the Evening Standard British Film Award for Best Actor for his performance, as well as the 1998 London Critics Circle Film Awards British Actor of the Year Award.

Awards
Award	Category	Name	Result
BAFTA Awards, 1997	Alexander Korda Award for Best British Film	Ken Loach and Sally Hibbin	Nominated
BAFTA Awards, Scotland 1997	Best Feature Film	Ken Loach, Sally Hibbin, Paul Laverty	Nominated
Camerimage, 1996	Golden Frog	Barry Ackroyd	Nominated
Evening Standard British Film Award, 1998	Best Actor	Robert Carlyle	Won
Havana Film Festival, 1996	Best Work of a Non-Latin American Director on a Latin America Subject	Ken Loach	Won
London Critics Circle Film Awards, 1998	British Actor of the Year	Robert Carlyle	Won
Venice Film Festival, 1996	The President of the Italian Senate's Gold Medal	Ken Loach	Won
Venice Film Festival, 1996	Golden Lion	Ken Loach	Nominated

== See also ==
- List of British films of 1996
- List of Spanish films of 1996
