= Shantell Martin =

British visual artist (born 1980)

Shantell Martin MBE
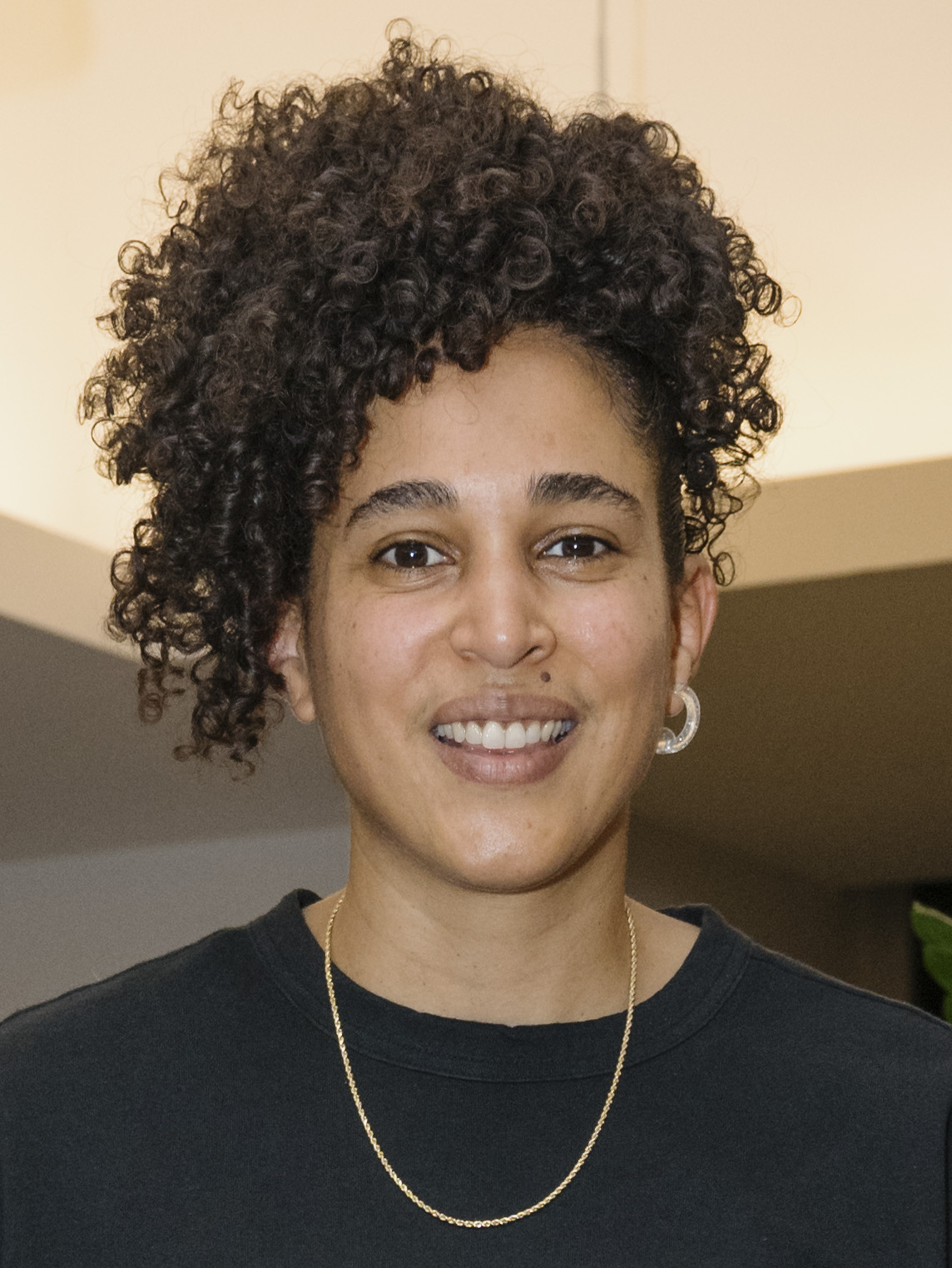
- Martin in 2024
- Born: Shantell May Martin; 1 October 1980 (age 45); Thamesmead, London, England
- Education: Camberwell College of Arts; Central Saint Martins
- Known for: Visual arts

Shantell May Martin MBE (born 1 October 1980) is a British visual artist and songwriter. Best known for her large scale, black-and-white line drawings, she performs many of her drawings for a live audience.

Along with exhibitions and commission for museums and galleries, Martin frequently collaborates with international commercial projects, both private and public.

== Early life ==
Martin was born in 1980 in Thamesmead in south-east London, and was educated nearby at Bexleyheath School in Bexleyheath. After a year at Camberwell College of Arts, she was admitted to Central Saint Martin's College of Art and Design in London.

After graduation, she lived in Japan where she first experimented with live performance art as a visual jockey. From 2006 to 2009, Martin developed her drawing skills through "liveography" — the process of projecting live drawings to sound, music or other experience.

== Career ==
External videos
- Martin gives a short talk about her work, 2012

In 2008, Martin relocated to New York. This period marked the next phase of her career, where she began to focus primarily on physical drawing.

Her first solo exhibition, Continuous Line, was held at Black and White Gallery in Williamsburg, New York, and her first solo museum show, ARE YOU YOU, opened at The Museum of Contemporary African Diasporan Arts in Brooklyn. This was followed by Black and White, a collaboration in embroidery with her grandmother, as a part of the Brooklyn Museum group show, Crossing Brooklyn: Art from Bushwick, Bed-Stuy, and Beyond, in 2015.

She staged a live drawing installation at the Museum of Modern Art in New York for a private event.

Since 2013, Martin has been adjunct professor at NYU Tisch ITP, a visiting scholar at MIT Media Lab, and a fellow at Columbia University’s Brown Institute for Media Innovation (at NYU Tisch School of the Arts where she taught the course "Drawing on Everything"). Martin was previously a visiting scholar and research affiliate at MIT Media Lab, Social Computing group (2011–2017). She was a 2018-2019 advisory board member for the Climate Museum in New York.

In addition to contributing to a body of work, Martin is a public figure. In 2012, her Bedford-Stuyvesant bedroom and artwork were featured in the New York Times' Home and Garden Section. Her personal style has been documented in Vogue, and The New Yorker created a short video on her creative process in 2014, called "Follow the Pen".

Martin was awarded an MBE in the 2025 New Year Honours "For services to the British Arts and to Charity".

== Collaborations ==
In 2016, Martin collaborated with Kendrick Lamar for a 75-minute performance at Art Basel in Miami. She worked with Puma for three separate collaborations, PUMA x SHANTELL MARTIN. In 2018, for her third collaboration, Puma staged a pop-up on Canal Street in New York City. She has also collaborated with Tiffany & Co., The North Face, Vespa and 1800 Tequila, as part of the tequila company's "Essential Artists" series. For Kelly Wearstler, she created a mural for the Melrose Avenue boutique and a line of clothing and furniture. She gave a TED talk, “How Drawing Can Set You Free” in June 2021. In 2023, Martin collaborated with type foundry ArrowType on the marker-style typeface Shantell Sans.

== Commissions ==
Martin had a commission in the lobby of the New York City Ballet as part of its annual Art Series. and a permanent mural for Young & Rubicam's Manhattan headquarters. In March 2022, Martin premiered her first choreographed ballet, “KITES,” at the Boston Ballet.

== Publications ==
WAVE: A Journey Through the Sea of Imagination for the Adventurous Colorist was published by TarcherPerigee as a nine-foot long coloring book with the artist's black-and-white line drawings. The book was created from a series of micro-detailed drawings in a series of 27 notebooks.

In March 2020, Heni Publishing released Martin's monograph, LINES, charting her prolific career. A 200 limited-edition version was included on release with a unique front and back cover drawn by the artist.

== Personal life ==
Born in Thamesmead, London, Martin lives and works in Los Angeles and New York. Martin is half-Nigerian. She is also queer.
