= List of British films of 1996 =

A list of British films released in 1996.

== 1996 ==
Title	Director	Cast	Genre	Notes
1996
The Adventures of Pinocchio	Steve Barron	Jonathan Taylor Thomas, Martin Landau, Geneviève Bujold	Fantasy	
August	Anthony Hopkins	Anthony Hopkins, Rhys Ifans, Leslie Phillips	Drama	
Beautiful Thing	Hettie Macdonald	Scott Neal, Glen Berry, Linda Henry	Romance/comedy/drama	
Boyfriends	Tom Hunsinger	James Dreyfus, Mark Sands	Drama	
Brassed Off	Mark Herman	Ewan McGregor, Pete Postlethwaite, Tara Fitzgerald	Comedy	
Carla's Song	Ken Loach	Robert Carlyle, Oyanka Cabezas	Drama	
Clancy's Kitchen	Duncan Roy	Mark Aiken, Indira Varma, Rocky Marshall	Comedy	
Crimetime	George Sluizer	Stephen Baldwin, Pete Postlethwaite, Sadie Frost	Thriller	
Different for Girls	Richard Spence	Steven Mackintosh, Rupert Graves	Comedy	
Dragonheart	Rob Cohen	Dennis Quaid, Sean Connery, David Thewlis	Fantasy	
Element of Doubt	Christopher Morahan	Nigel Havers, Gina McKee	Thriller	
Emma	Douglas McGrath	Gwyneth Paltrow, James Cosmo	Romance	
Fargo	Joel Coen	Frances McDormand, William H. Macy, Steve Buscemi, Harve Presnell, Peter Stormare	Black comedy/crime	American-British co-production
Glastonbury the Movie			Documentary	Glastonbury Festival
Hamlet	Kenneth Branagh	Kenneth Branagh, Derek Jacobi	Literary drama	Adaptation of the play by William Shakespeare
Hard Men	J. K. Amalou		Crime drama	
Hellraiser: Bloodline	Kevin Yagher	Bruce Ramsay, Valentina Vargas, Doug Bradley	Science fiction horror	
The Innocent Sleep	Scott Michell	Oliver Cotton, Tony Bluto	Thriller	
Intimate Relations	Philip Goodhew	Julie Walters, Rupert Graves	Black comedy	
James and the Giant Peach	Henry Selick	Paul Terry, Joanna Lumley	Fantasy/adventure	
Jane Eyre	Franco Zeffirelli	William Hurt, Charlotte Gainsbourg	Drama	
Jude	Michael Winterbottom	Christopher Eccleston, Kate Winslet	Drama	
The Leading Man	John Duigan	Jon Bon Jovi, Anna Galiena	Thriller	
Loch Ness	John Henderson	Ted Danson, Joely Richardson	Drama	
The Pillow Book	Peter Greenaway	Vivian Wu, Ewan McGregor, Ken Ogata	Drama	
The Rolling Stones Rock and Roll Circus	Michael Lindsay-Hogg	The Rolling Stones	Documentary	
Saint-Ex	Anand Tucker	Bruno Ganz, Miranda Richardson	Biopic	
Secrets & Lies	Mike Leigh	Brenda Blethyn, Marianne Jean-Baptiste, Timothy Spall	Drama	Won the Palme d'Or at Cannes
Small Faces	Gillies MacKinnon	Iain Robertson, Joseph McFadden	Drama	
Space Truckers	Stuart Gordon	Dennis Hopper, Debi Mazar	Sci-fi	
Stealing Beauty	Bernardo Bertolucci	Joseph Fiennes, Jeremy Irons, Liv Tyler	Drama	Co-production with France and Italy
Stella Does Tricks	Coky Giedroyc	Kelly Macdonald, James Bolam	Drama	
The English Patient	Anthony Minghella	Ralph Fiennes, Kristin Scott Thomas, Willem Dafoe, Juliette Binoche	Romantic war drama	
Trainspotting	Danny Boyle	Ewan McGregor, Jonny Lee Miller, Robert Carlyle	Drama	Number 10 in the list of BFI Top 100 British films
True Blue	Ferdinand Fairfax	Johan Leysen, Geraldine Somerville	Sports drama	
Twelfth Night	Trevor Nunn	Imogen Stubbs, Toby Stephens	Comedy	
Victory	Mark Peploe	Willem Dafoe, Sam Neill	Drama	Co-production with France and Germany
White Squall	Ridley Scott	Jeff Bridges, Caroline Goodall, John Savage, Scott Wolf, Jeremy Sisto, Balthazar Getty	Disaster survival	Co-production with the US
The Wind in the Willows	Terry Jones	Steve Coogan, Eric Idle, Terry Jones	Family	

== See also ==
- 1996 in film
- 1996 in British music
- 1996 in British radio
- 1996 in British television
- 1996 in the United Kingdom
- List of 1996 box office number-one films in the United Kingdom
