= London Academies Enterprise Trust =

London Academies Enterprise Trust (LAET) was a multi-academy trust (MAT) controlled by the Academies Enterprise Trust (AET) in England. It was dissolved in August 2021.

== History ==
Since the 1990s schools in London had been improving at a faster rate than schools in the rest of England, and this is called the "London Effect."

In 2010 Boris Johnson, the Mayor of London decided that the Mayor’s office should be involved in school transformation by sponsoring Academies. He therefore formed a group called the Mayor’s Academies Limited (MAL) and decided to work in a partnership with the country’s largest academy chain, (AET), as joint co-sponsors in order to transform London schools. This partnership was formalised in the setting up on 1 April 2010 of a limited company (Company number 07211219) called London Academies Enterprise Trust (LAET)

The Mayor's Academies programme was controversial. Even at the very time that the programme was announced in 2010, concerns were raised by London Assembly leader Len Duvall who said that it was “just a vanity project that sound good for a short while, but long term what's really going to be the impact?". Concerns about the programme proved to be not without foundation, as (AET) went on to become embroiled in financial controversy when it was revealed that Ian Comfort (the CEO) and other directors' businesses were benefiting directly from AET contracts. Then the DfE went on to ban (AET) from expanding and opening more academies, including it on its list of "restricted" Academy chains until it could improve the performance of the schools which it already had. The Education Funding Agency went on to give (AET) a financial Warning Notice for poor financial practices. OFSTED also went on to blast (AET) for low expectations and poor standards The Mayor's Academies programme had originally been intended to have 10 Academies. But following the problems which (AET) found itself with, and the difficulties in improving the LAET schools (which we shall see more on below), the LAET only ever grew to 4 Academies before the Mayor's Office began withdrawing from the programme.

The Mayor's withdrawal can be seen for example in 2015 when one of the 4 schools received criticism from OFSTED for its poor standards, a spokesman on behalf of the Mayor stated "The Mayor has not been involved in the governance of the schools since 2013, but we are in touch with the London Academies Education Trust to see what is being done to raise attainment at Kingsley." Previous to this in July 2013 the Mayor's Academies Programme had transferred from the London Development Agency (LDA) to the GLA and the Mayor resigned as a corporate member of LAET.

As of August 2014 the trust employed 299 teachers, compared to 328 at the same time in 2013.

Confusion about the trust arose in 2017 when individual academies such as Kingsley Academy ceased describing itself as an LAET school, and began posting a welcome from the CEO of AET (Academies Enterprise Trust) which described it as an AET Academy. Records at Company House nevertheless confirmed that LAET still existed as a separate Trust.

== Schools ==
The four schools within London Academies Enterprise Trust (LAET) are contained in the following table which notes their pass rate for the flagship measure of 5GCSE A-C (including English and Maths) until 2015. From 2016 the measure of school performance changed to "progress 8"

Academy Name	Joined AET	OFSTED Grade	2011	2012	2013	2014	2015	2016
Aylward Academy	Apr 2010	Good	48%	43%	43%	40%	41%	-0.12
Bexleyheath Academy	Sep 2011	Requires Improvement	NA	51%	61%	49%	25%	-0.56
Kingsley Academy	Apr 2013	Requires Improvement	43%	47%	34%	46%	38%	-0.09
Nightingale Academy	Sep 2010	Requires Improvement	42%	33%	43%	35%	32%	-0.18
National Maintained Schools			59%	59%	60%	57%	59%	0

In 2015 three of the four schools were below the minimum 40% government "floor standard." Several of the schools have gone backwards with their results, and OFSTED judgements have declined (e.g. Kingsley and Bexleyheath).

On the new measures from 2016 all of the schools have achieved below the national average of "0." Bexleyheath's progress measure is in the bottom 10% of schools for England

== Financial management ==
The 4 LAET schools have had access to additional funding, over and above what other schools would normally receive from the Department for Education. As the Mayor's contribution to the scheme, the schools have received almost £1m in extra funding from Boris Johnson, including £330,000 to Kingsley Academy alone. Previous to this in July 2013 the Mayor's Academies Programme had transferred from the London Development Agency (LDA) to the GLA and the Mayor resigned as a corporate member of LAET.

According to the LAET Annual Financial Report (p7) in 2014 LAET made an in-year deficit (i.e. a loss) of -£544,000. with Nightingale Academy being more than £1m in deficit. At the same time the headcount of teachers reduced by 29 between 2013 and 2014 (from 329 to 299) the number of managers in LAET increased from 28 to 30 and the number of staff paid at £100,000 per annum or more, increased from 2 to 3.
