= Mayor of London =

Head of the government of Greater London

- Coat of arms of the Greater London Authority

- Wordmark

- Incumbent; The Lord Khan of Tooting since 9 May 2016
- Greater London Authority
- Type: Council Leader
- Status: Chief executive officer
- Member of: Greater London Authority; Council of the Nations and Regions; Mayoral Council for England
- Reports to: London Assembly
- Seat: City Hall, London
- Appointer: Electorate of London
- Term length: Four years, renewable
- Constituting instrument: Greater London Authority Act 1999, s 2(1)(a)
- Inaugural holder: Ken Livingstone
- Deputy: Statutory Deputy Mayor of London
- Salary: £170,282 (per annum)

The mayor of London is the strategic authority mayor for the Greater London Authority. The role was created in 2000 after the Greater London devolution referendum in 1998, and was the first directly elected mayor in the United Kingdom.

Sadiq Khan took office as mayor on 9 May 2016, and was re-elected in 2021 and 2024. The position had been held by Ken Livingstone from the creation of the role on 4 May 2000 until he was defeated after two terms in May 2008 by Boris Johnson, who also served two terms before Khan was elected.

The mayor is scrutinised by the London Assembly and, supported by their Mayoral Cabinet, is responsible for the strategic government of the entirety of London, including the City of London (for which there is also the Lord Mayor of the City of London). Each of the 32 London Boroughs also has a ceremonial mayor or, in Croydon, Hackney, Lewisham, Newham and Tower Hamlets, an elected mayor. The mayor of London is elected by the largest single-member electorate in the United Kingdom.

== Background ==
The Greater London Council, the elected government for Greater London, was abolished in 1986 by the Local Government Act 1985. Strategic functions were split off to various joint arrangements. Londoners voted in a referendum in 1998 to create a new governance structure for Greater London. The directly elected mayor of London was created by the Greater London Authority Act 1999 in 2000 as part of the reforms.

== Elections ==
The mayor is elected for a fixed term of four years, with elections taking place in May.

Voting is conducted by the supplementary vote method, except in 2024 when the first-past-the-post system was substituted by the Elections Act 2022, which was passed by the Conservative government. In 2026, the Labour government restored the supplementary vote.

There are no limits on the number of terms a mayor may serve. The mayor is elected by the largest single-member electorate in the United Kingdom.

As with most elected posts in the United Kingdom, there is a deposit (in this case of £10,000), which is returnable on the candidate's winning of at least 5% of votes cast.

=== 2024 election ===
A London mayoral election was held on 2 May 2024, with results announced on 4 May. Sadiq Khan was re-elected as mayor beating the Conservative Susan Hall, becoming the first mayor elected for three terms.

== List of mayors ==
Colour key
(for political parties)
Independent
Labour
Conservative

| # | Portrait | Name (Birth–Death) | Term of office | | Elected | Political party | Previous, concurrent and subsequent political offices |
|---|---|---|---|---|---|---|---|
| 1 | | Ken Livingstone (born 1945) | 4 May 2000 | 4 May 2008 (Note: The Adjudication Panel for England suspended Livingstone from the office of mayor for 4 weeks in February 2006, but this was overturned in October 2006.) | 2000 2004 | Independent Labour | Member of the Greater London Council (Note: for Norwood (1973–1977); Hackney North and Stoke Newington (1977–1981); Paddington (1981–1986)) (1973–1986); Leader of the Greater London Council (1981–1986); Member of Parliament for Brent East (1987–2001) |
| 1 | | Ken Livingstone (born 1945) | 8 years, 0 days | | 2000 2004 | Independent Labour | Member of the Greater London Council (1973–1986); Leader of the Greater London Council (1981–1986); Member of Parliament for Brent East (1987–2001) |
| 2 | | Boris Johnson (born 1964) | 4 May 2008 | 9 May 2016 | 2008 2012 | Conservative | Member of Parliament for Henley (2001–2008); Member of Parliament for Uxbridge and South Ruislip (2015–2023); Secretary of State for Foreign and Commonwealth Affairs (2016–2018); Leader of the Conservative Party (2019–2022); Prime Minister (2019–2022) |
| 2 | | Boris Johnson (born 1964) | 8 years, 5 days | | 2008 2012 | Conservative | Member of Parliament for Henley (2001–2008); Member of Parliament for Uxbridge and South Ruislip (2015–2023); Secretary of State for Foreign and Commonwealth Affairs (2016–2018); Leader of the Conservative Party (2019–2022); Prime Minister (2019–2022) |
| 3 | | Sadiq Khan, Baron Khan of Tooting (born 1970) | 9 May 2016 | Incumbent | 2016 2021 2024 | Labour | Member of Parliament for Tooting (2005–2016); Minister of State for Transport (2009–2010); Shadow Secretary of State for Justice and Shadow Lord Chancellor (2010–2015); Member of the House of Lords (2026–present) |
| 3 | | Sadiq Khan, Baron Khan of Tooting (born 1970) | 10 years, 172 days | | 2016 2021 2024 | Labour | Member of Parliament for Tooting (2005–2016); Minister of State for Transport (2009–2010); Shadow Secretary of State for Justice and Shadow Lord Chancellor (2010–2015); Member of the House of Lords (2026–present) |

== Timeline ==
Timeline

== Powers and functions ==
Most powers are derived from the Greater London Authority Act 1999, with additional functions coming from the Greater London Authority Act 2007, the Localism Act 2011 and Police Reform and Social Responsibility Act 2011.

The mayor's main functions are:

- Strategic planning, including housing, waste management, the environment and production of the London Plan
- Refuse or permit planning permission on strategic grounds
- Transport policy, delivered by functional body Transport for London
- Fire and emergency planning, delivered by functional body London Fire and Emergency Planning Authority
- Policing and crime policy, delivered by functional body Mayor's Office for Policing and Crime (before 2012 by functional body Metropolitan Police Authority). The Metropolitan Police has a structure different to most others across the country, reporting to the Mayor of London instead of a police and crime commissioner.
- Economic development, delivered directly by the Greater London Authority through subsidiary company GLA Land and Property (before 2012 by functional body London Development Agency)
- Power to create development corporations, such as the London Legacy Development Corporation

The remaining local government functions are performed by the London borough councils. There is some overlap; for example, the borough councils are responsible for waste management, but the mayor is required to produce a waste management strategy. In 2010, Johnson launched an initiative in partnership with the Multi-academy Trust AET to transform schools across London. This led to the establishment of London Academies Enterprise Trust (LAET) which was intended to be a group of ten academies, but it only reached a group of four before the mayor withdrew it in 2013. The mayor is a member of the Mayoral Council for England and the Council of the Nations and Regions.

The following is a table comparing power over services of the boroughs to the GLA and mayor.

| Service | Greater London Authority | London borough councils |
|---|---|---|
| Education | | check |
| Housing | check | check |
| Planning applications | | check |
| Strategic planning | check | check |
| Premises licensing | (Note: Since the English Devolution and Community Empowerment Act 2026) | check |
| Transport planning | check | check |
| Passenger transport | check | |
| Highways | check | check |
| Police | check | |
| Fire | check | |
| Social services | | check |
| Libraries | | check |
| Leisure and recreation | | check |
| Waste collection | | check |
| Waste disposal | | check |
| Environmental health | | check |
| Revenue collection | | check |

== Initiatives ==
=== Ken Livingstone ===
Initiatives taken by Ken Livingstone as Mayor of London included the London congestion charge on private vehicles using city centre London on weekdays, the creation of the London Climate Change Agency, the London Energy Partnership and the founding of the international Large Cities Climate Leadership Group, now known as C40 Cities Climate Leadership Group. The congestion charge led to many new buses being introduced across London. In August 2003, Livingstone oversaw the introduction of the Oyster card electronic ticketing system for Transport for London services. Livingstone supported the withdrawal of the vintage AEC Routemaster buses from regular service in London.

Livingstone introduced the London Partnerships Register which was a voluntary scheme without legal force for same sex couples to register their partnership, and paved the way for the introduction by the United Kingdom Parliament of civil partnerships and later still, Same-sex marriage. Unlike civil partnerships, the London Partnerships Register was open to heterosexual couples who favour a public commitment other than marriage.

As Mayor of London, Livingstone was a supporter of the London Olympics in 2012, ultimately winning the bid to host the Games in 2005. Livingstone encouraged sport in London; especially when sport could be combined with helping charities like The London Marathon and 10K charity races. Livingstone, in a mayoral election debate on the BBC's Question Time in April 2008, stated that the primary reason he supported the Olympic bid was to secure funding for the redevelopment of the East End of London. In July 2007, he brought the Tour de France cycle race to London.

=== Boris Johnson ===
In May 2008, Boris Johnson introduced a new transport safety initiative to put 440 high visibility police officers in and around bus stations. A ban on alcohol on underground, and Docklands Light Railway, tram services and stations across the capital was introduced.

Also in May 2008, he announced the closure of The Londoner newspaper, saving approximately £2.9 million. A percentage of this saving was to be spent on planting 10,000 new street trees.

In 2010, he extended the coverage of Oyster card electronic ticketing to all National Rail overground train services. Also in 2010, he opened a cycle hire scheme (originally sponsored by Barclays bank, now Santander bank) with 5,000 bicycles available for hire across London. Although initiated by his predecessor, Ken Livingstone, the scheme rapidly acquired the nickname of "Boris Bikes". Johnson withdrew the recently introduced high-speed high-capacity "bendy buses" which had been bought by Livingstone from service in 2011, and supported the development of the New Routemaster bus which entered service the next year.

In 2011, Boris Johnson set up the Outer London Fund of £50 million designed to help improve local high streets. Areas in London were given the chance to submit proposals for two tranches of funding. Successful bids for Phase 1 included Enfield, Muswell Hill and Bexley town centre. As of 2011 the recipients of phase 2 funding were still to be announced.

In January 2013, he appointed journalist Andrew Gilligan as the first Cycling Commissioner for London. In March 2013, Johnson announced £1 billion of investment in infrastructure to make cycling safer in London, including a 15-mile (24 km) East to West segregated 'Crossrail for bikes'.

At the general election of 7 May 2015, Johnson was elected MP for Uxbridge and South Ruislip, He continued to serve as mayor for the remainder of his term, and was not a candidate in the mayoral election of May 2016, won by Labour's Sadiq Khan. Johnson was later elected prime minister in 2019.

=== Sadiq Khan ===
==== First term ====
Sadiq Khan introduced the 'bus hopper' fare on TfL buses, which allows passengers to board a second bus within one hour for the same fare. Under Khan cash payment for travel was discontinued; payment was accepted, as before, by Oyster payment card, and contactless payment by debit or credit card was introduced, an initiative started under Johnson.

Upon election, Khan outlined a vision to make London the "greenest city" by investing in walking and cycling infrastructure and reducing polluting vehicles. In 2019, the London "Ultra Low Emission Zone" (ULEZ), in which higher-polluting vehicles pay a charge, was established. London declared itself the world's first "National Park City" (effective from July 2019), reflecting its unusually high amount of green space for a city of its size. The Government postponed all elections due in May 2020, including for the mayor of London, for one year due to the COVID-19 pandemic, so that Khan served a five- rather than four-year first term.

==== Second term ====
Elections were held in May 2021; Khan was re-elected for a three-year term, defeating the Conservative candidate Shaun Bailey.

== Controversies ==
=== Ken Livingstone ===
In February 2006, Livingstone was suspended from office for four weeks by the Adjudication Panel for England after telling a Jewish reporter from the Evening Standard, who had asked him for a comment outside a City Hall reception, that he was acting "just like a concentration camp guard." The panel found he had brought his office into disrepute. Livingstone appealed to the High Court, which quashed the suspension in October 2006; justice Andrew Collins ruled the remark "unnecessarily offensive" and "indefensible" but found the panel had misdirected itself, as Livingstone had not been acting in an official capacity.

=== Boris Johnson ===
Johnson strongly backed the Garden Bridge, a proposed pedestrian crossing over the Thames with extensive planting, from 2013. After he left office, Sadiq Khan commissioned an independent review led by Dame Margaret Hodge, which raised concerns about value for money and recommended the scheme not proceed; Khan withdrew the mayoral guarantee and the project was abandoned in 2017. A subsequent Transport for London report found the bridge had cost £53.5 million, almost £43 million of it public funds, with no reasonable prospect of recovery.

In 2014, Johnson authorised the purchase of three second-hand water cannons from the German police for over £320,000, anticipating public disorder. In 2015, Home Secretary Theresa May refused to license them for use in England and Wales on safety grounds; Khan's administration sold them for scrap in 2018 for just over £11,000, a net loss of more than £300,000.

=== Sadiq Khan ===
In August 2023, Khan expanded the Ultra Low Emission Zone (ULEZ) to cover all of Greater London, requiring non-compliant vehicles to pay a £12.50 daily charge. The expansion proved highly contentious, with critics, including several outer London councils and Conservative politicians, arguing that it imposed a disproportionate financial burden on drivers in outer London, particularly those on lower incomes, while supporters, such as health campaigners and medical organisations, pointed to the scheme's expected air quality and public health benefits. Several councils mounted an unsuccessful legal challenge against the expansion.

Following the 7 October 2023 Hamas attacks, large pro-Palestinian marches in central London prompted calls from some Conservative politicians and Jewish community leaders for Khan to curtail or ban the demonstrations. Khan said the right to peaceful protest was a "cornerstone" of democracy and that the Mayor lacked legal powers to ban marches, while condemning antisemitic and extremist behaviour and urging protesters to be mindful of Jewish Londoners' fears.

== See also ==
- International relations of the Greater London Authority
- Leaders of the Greater London Council
- Timeline of London § 21st century
