= Bexleyheath Academy =

Mixed secondary school in Bexleyheath, London

Coordinates: 51.460°N 0.144°E

Location
- Woolwich Road; Bexleyheath, London, DA6 7DA; England

Information
- Type: Academy
- Motto: Pride Through Achievement
- Established: 1968
- Local authority: London Borough of Bexley
- Department for Education URN: 137138 Tables
- Ofsted: Reports
- Principal: Rubeka Luthfa
- Staff: 200 Approx
- Gender: Mixed
- Age: 11 to 18
- Enrolment: 2000 Approx
- Academy: Lift Schools
- Website: www.bexleyheathacademy.org

Bexleyheath Academy is a mixed secondary school state school in Bexleyheath, in the London Borough of Bexley. Students typically join the school in year 7 or enter into the sixth form.

== History ==
Logo during time as Bexleyheath School

The school was formed as a result of the merger in 1968 of two schools - an all-girls secondary modern school on the current site, and a boys central school which was located on Graham Road. The current site has been in use since before World War II and is set in a residential area.

On 1 September 2011, Bexleyheath School became Bexleyheath Academy, sponsored by the London Academies Enterprise Trust (LAET), part of the Academies Enterprise Trust (AET) family of schools.

Headmaster Malcolm Noble retired after 14 years in the 2007 Summer term. He was replaced on an interim basis by Paul O'Brien. In 2010, he was replaced by Robert Dore until 2013 when Carl Wakefield took over. He left in 2015 and was replaced by Jan Atkinson on an interim basis. In January 2016 the governors announced they were advertising for a permanent Principal, and in June 2016 it was announced that Mr Mark Pinchin, an ambassador for the Youth Sports Trust, had been appointed the new permanent principal and started in September 2016.

In 2014 a report published by the Office of the Schools Adjudicator revealed Bexleyheath Academy had failed to comply with central Government criteria. The report, which was published on gov.uk, said: "Two issues were raised about the 2014 sixth form admission arrangements.

"The first was that there were no current arrangements for admission to the sixth form on the school’s website and the second was that the school required applicants to attend a selection interview as part of the admission arrangements to the sixth form.

"The letter does not make it clear that the interview is not part of the admission arrangements and that if an applicant does not attend it has no bearing on the success or otherwise of their application.

In 2019, the school was the subject of controversy due to having seven headteachers in eight years, and receiving an "Inadequate" Ofsted inspection.

== GCSE League Tables ==
The GCSE results for Summer 2015 were 26% A*-C (Incl English and Maths), the lowest of all the standard maintained secondary schools in the London Borough of Bexley, and a decline from 2014 when the results were 49%.

== Premises ==
The new buildings were opened in 2006. The main contractor for the project was Skanska. It is a PFI owned school. The newest building, a revamp on the old admin building, has a gym, new music classrooms and facilities for the music and PE department. All the facilities of the school are open to the community for use out of school hours.

== Uniform ==
The school's uniform is navy blue blazer, mid grey trousers or skirt, white shirt, grey jumper and tie with appropriate year colour stripe. When the new uniform was introduced in 2011 there were shortages.

== Notable alumni ==
=== As Bexleyheath School ===
- Shantell Martin, artist
- Liam Ridgewell, footballer (Portland Timbers)
- Linda Smith, stand-up comic and radio comedian
- Andy Townsend, professional footballer

=== Bexleyheath Boys’ Secondary Modern School ===
- Kenneth Noye, notorious criminal

=== Bexleyheath Secondary Modern School For Girls ===
- Delia Smith, TV chef
- Joan Thirkettle, television journalist
- Pamela Kosh, actress and stage director
