= Tarbuck's Luck =

1970 British TV variety show

- Genre: Comedy
- Starring: Jimmy Tarbuck
- Composer: Ronnie Hazlehurst
- Country of origin: United Kingdom
- Original language: English
- No. of series: 1
- No. of episodes: 7

Production
- Producers: Freddie Carpenter; James Moir; Peter Whitmore
- Running time: 45 minutes
- Production company: BBC

Original release
- Network: BBC One
- Release: 29 May 1970 – 13 May 1972

Tarbuck's Luck is a British television variety show which aired on BBC 1. It appeared for one-off episode in 1970, then returned as a full six-part series in 1972. Hosted by Jimmy Tarbuck, who had been signed up by the BBC following his success on ITV's Sunday Night at the London Palladium, it combined a mixture of stand-up comedy, sketches and musical performances.

Guests who appeared on the show included Anita Harris, Lionel Blair, Carolyn Seymour, The Bee Gees, Cilla Black, Carol Raye, Joan Benham, Julia Breck, April Walker, June Whitfield, Yootha Joyce, Miriam Karlin, Patricia Hayes, Lulu, Margaret Nolan, Clodagh Rodgers, Joan Sims, Harry Secombe, Josephine Tewson and Sheila Steafel.

== Bibliography ==
- Maxford, Howard . Hammer Complete: The Films, the Personnel, the Company. McFarland, 2018.
- Perry, Christopher . The British Television Pilot Episodes Research Guide 1936-2015. 2015.
