= Kingsley Academy =

Location
- Cecil Road; Hounslow, Greater London, TW3 1AX; England
- Coordinates: 51.4708°N 0.3590°W

Information
- Former name: Hounslow Manor School
- Type: Academy
- Motto: Find your remarkable
- Local authority: Hounslow London Borough Council
- Trust: London Academies Enterprise Trust
- Department for Education URN: 139276 Tables
- Ofsted: Reports
- Head teacher: Bob Tinsley
- Gender: Mixed
- Age range: 11–18
- Enrolment: 744 (2019)
- Capacity: 1,000
- Website: www.kingsleyacademy.org

Kingsley Academy (formerly Hounslow Manor School) is an 11–18 mixed, secondary school and sixth form with academy status in Hounslow, Greater London, England. It is part of the Academies Enterprise Trust.
