= Parkinson's Sunday Supplement =

BBC programme

- Genre: Music, news and talk
- Running time: 120 minutes
- Country of origin: United Kingdom
- Language: English
- Home station: BBC Radio 2
- Hosted by: Michael Parkinson
- Produced by: Rick Rosgrow, Anthony Cherry
- Original release: 31 March 1996 – 2 December 2007
- Audio format: Stereo
- Website: www.bbc.co.uk/programmes/b006z81s

Parkinson's Sunday Supplement is the incarnation of the Sunday morning programme on BBC Radio 2, between 31 March 1996 and 2 December 2007. It was presented by the journalist and broadcaster Michael Parkinson. The programme featured newspaper reviews and entertainment summaries with the help of journalists and a lengthy interview with a media personality.

== Show format ==
The programme began after the 11:00 news and was introduced by Parkinson, who would outline some of the features that would be on that morning's show. These would usually be a review of the Sunday papers with a guest; a round-up of the week's entertainment news in the world of film, radio, television, music and the arts, also with a guest reviewer; and after the midday news, an interview with a media personality from the worlds of entertainment, arts, sport and music. Between these features Parkinson would play what he termed "the very best in music" from the jazz and big band genres, including such artists as Frank Sinatra, Ella Fitzgerald, Sarah Vaughan and Joe Williams. After his guest interview Parkinson would often review new album releases in the jazz and big band genres, playing a selection of tracks. The show was then concluded before handing over to the 13:00 news bulletin. Guests for the newspaper review included Steve Richards from the New Statesman and Michael Prescott from The Guardian. Entertainment guests included Gillian Reynolds from The Daily Telegraph and the BBC Radio 4 journalist Quentin Cooper.

Parkinson won a Sony Radio Award for the programme in 1998.

In October 2007, a few months after announcing his retirement from his television series, Parkinson said his radio show would also end. The final edition of Parkinson's Sunday Supplement was aired on 2 December 2007. His final guest was the actor Sir Ian McKellen. It was replaced in early 2008 by a show presented by Michael Ball titled Michael Ball's Sunday Brunch.
