= Jimmy Tarbuck =

English comedian (born 1940)

Jimmy Tarbuck OBE
- Born: James Joseph Tarbuck; 6 February 1940 (age 86); Wavertree, Liverpool, England
- Other name: Tarby
- Occupations: Comedian; television presenter
- Years active: 1963–present
- Spouse: Pauline Carfoot (m. 1959)
- Children: 3, including Liza
- Website: jimmytarbuck.com

James Joseph Tarbuck (born 6 February 1940) is an English comedian, singer, actor, entertainer and game show host.

Tarbuck was a host of Sunday Night at the London Palladium in the mid-1960s and hosted numerous game shows and quiz shows on ITV during the 1970s, 1980s and early 1990s. He is also known for leading ITV's Live from Her Majesty's and its subsequent incarnations during the 1980s.

Actress, television and radio presenter Liza Tarbuck is his daughter.

== Biography ==
Tarbuck was born in Wavertree, Liverpool, on 6 February 1940, son of Ada (née McLoughlin) and bookmaker Joseph Frederick Tarbuck. Joseph Tarbuck had been at school with Ted Ray. Jimmy had a brother, Kenneth, and a sister, Norma; another older brother had died at 18 months old. Jimmy was a friend of Dave Morris. He attended Dovedale Primary School in Liverpool, where he was a schoolmate of John Lennon.

In April 1960, at the age of 20, he was convicted of stealing a diamond-encrusted cigarette holder from the dressing room of comedian Terry-Thomas, and was placed on probation for two years. For a period, he worked in a ladies' hairdresser with Mike McCartney (brother of Paul) and Lewis Collins.

His first television show was It's Tarbuck '65! on ITV in 1964, though he had been introduced on Sunday Night at the London Palladium in October 1963 by Bruce Forsyth. He then replaced Forsyth as the last original host of the show from 1965 until it was cancelled in 1967. He has also hosted numerous quiz shows, including Winner Takes All (1976–1986), Old Flames (1991), Full Swing (1996), and Tarby's Frame Game (1987–1989). In the early 1970s he hosted a variety show Tarbuck's Luck on the BBC.

In the 1980s, he hosted similar Sunday night variety shows, Live from Her Majesty's, Live from the Piccadilly and finally Live from the Palladium, which were produced by London Weekend Television for ITV.

He appeared on the fourth series of BBC One's Strictly Come Dancing in 2006, but was forced to pull out due to high blood pressure, and needed surgery to fit stents in his heart. In 2008, he returned to a variety format on television screens when he co-hosted, alongside Emma Bunton, an edition of ITV1's variety show For One Night Only. He appeared on Piers Morgan's Life Stories on 25 May 2012, while on 3 December that year he was invited to celebrate 100 years of the Royal Variety Performance along with Bruce Forsyth, Ronnie Corbett and Des O'Connor.

Tarbuck made a Comedy Playhouse pilot for the BBC in 1967, acting in Johnny Speight's To Lucifer, A Son alongside John Le Mesurier and Pat Coombs, but a series was not commissioned. In October 2015, Tarbuck and Des O'Connor starred in their own one-off show at the London Palladium to raise money for the new Royal Variety Charity. During the following two years they toured clubs and theatres around the UK with his comedy show.

Tarbuck was a close friend of actor and singer Kenny Lynch.

In 2026, Tarbuck starred in horror short A Hand to Hold, opposite Frances Barber, Murray McArthur and Shane Casey, playing a catholic priest.

== Personal life ==
Tarbuck married Pauline (née Carfoot) on 9 September 1959 at Our Lady of Mount Carmel Roman Catholic Church in Toxteth. His best man was footballer Bobby Campbell. The couple live in Coombe, Kingston upon Thames and have three children.

Tarbuck has often been nicknamed 'Tarby'. He is a Conservative Party supporter and at the height of his celebrity was a prominent supporter of Margaret Thatcher.

Tarbuck is well known as a keen player of golf, and was prominent as a competitor in pro-celebrity golf matches when these were televised. He is also a devoted supporter of Liverpool Football Club.

In February 2020, Tarbuck revealed that he had been diagnosed with prostate cancer.

On 15 May 2023, Tarbuck committed a series of driving offences, causing damage to vehicles while driving in Kingston upon Thames, near his home. He was subsequently fined £716 and his driving record was issued with five penalty points. Tarbuck sent a letter to Lavender Hill Magistrates' Court pleading guilty to the offences and apologising for his actions. The incident was reported to have occurred a few days after his sister's funeral.

== Discography ==
=== Albums ===
- Jimmy Tarbuck (RCA Victor, 1968)
- Having a Party (Wonderful, 1980, Jimmy Tarbuck & Kenny Lynch)
- Jimmy Tarbuck (Clam Records)

=== Singles and EPs ===
- "Someday" / "Wastin' Time" (Immediate, 1965)
- "Stewball" / "When My Little Girl Is Smiling" (Philips, 1967)
- "Doctor Dolittle" (Parlophone, 1967)
- "Your Cheatin' Heart" (Parlophone, 1968)
- "There's No Such Thing as Love" (RCA Victor, 1968)
- "You Wanted Someone to Play With" (RCA Victor, 1969)
- "Lucky Jim" / "Run to Him" (Bell, 1972)
- "Follow the Fairway" / "Lee Trevino" (EMI, 1976)†
- "Let's Have a Party" (Laser, 1979, with Kenny Lynch)
- "Let's Have a Party" (Towerbell, 1982, EP with Kenny Lynch)
- "Again" (Safari, 1985)

†Credited to 'The Caddies' (Henry Cooper, Tony Dalli, Bruce Forsyth, Kenny Lynch, Glen Mason, Ed Stewart, Jimmy Tarbuck)
