= Full Swing (game show) =

- Genre: Game show
- Directed by: John Rooney
- Presented by: Jimmy Tarbuck
- Narrated by: Rosemarie Ford
- Country of origin: United Kingdom
- Original language: English
- No. of series: 1
- No. of episodes: 8

Production
- Running time: 30 minutes

Original release
- Network: BBC1
- Release: 25 May – 27 July 1996

Related
- Bullseye; Big Break

Full Swing is a British game show that aired on BBC1 from 25 May to 27 July 1996 and hosted by Jimmy Tarbuck with voice overs by Rosemarie Ford.

== Format ==
=== Round 1: Three for the Tee ===
The contestant's celebrity guests use a golf simulator of famous golf courses. The celeb swings – the ball landing on the green or a hazard. The contestant is asked questions by cards. A correct answer gives a boost toward the pin.

Whichever 2 pairs gets closest to the pin goes through to round 2; the one who gets the least is eliminated and wins a consolation prize through a bonus game called Crazy Consolation.

=== Round 2: Fairway Or Foul ===
In this round, the contestant answers a question to make the celeb hit the ball to the green, which has hazards.

- bunkers or deep bunkers
- river and waterfalls
- rabbits digging holes

There is a special golf hole that the ball only goes into if it is lit up; if it is not lit, it ejects the golf ball back onto the green.

If it lands on any hazard, the contestant answers a hazard question – if they get it right, Tarbuck places the ball on the green for the contestant to putt in to the hole; if they get it wrong, they get another chance.

The winner was who putts the ball with the most remaining time or nearest to the pin. The losing contestant and their celebrity guest play a bonus round to win a cash consolation prize, called Celebrity Consolation.

=== Round 3: The Final Green ===
The contestant answers 4 general knowledge questions, getting them all right adds 40 seconds to the clock. Then a Bonus Ball is selected at random from a massive golf ball (similar to lottery machine). Each are numbered 10 to 60, and whichever one the contestant picks out, then it is added the time.

The celebrity guest then had to putt 10 golf balls into a hole within the time the contestant had accumulated, with the money rising from £100 to £1,000. Sinking all the balls in the hole wins the £1,000 jackpot, a holiday, if not they go away with the money they had won.
