= Joan Thirkettle =

British journalist (1947–1996)

- Born: 14 September 1947; Kent, United Kingdom
- Died: 11 May 1996 (aged 48); London, United Kingdom
- Occupations: Television journalist and radio personality
- Notable credit: ITN

Joan Thirkettle (14 September 1947 – 11 May 1996) was a British television journalist, radio personality and writer. She was one of the first female reporters to work for ITN, and was part of a team which won the broadcaster a Royal Television Society Award in 1994 for their coverage of the death of Labour Party leader John Smith.

== Early life ==
Thirkettle was born in Kent on 14 September 1947. She attended school at Hurst Primary School and at Bexleyheath Academy in Bexleyheath, Kent, where she was brought up. She took an external degree in English at the University of London.

== Career ==
Thirkettle began her career in journalism as a trainee researcher with Associated Rediffusion, London's first ITV television station, in 1965 and as a researcher for Radio Caroline, before moving into print journalism, first joining the Daily Mail and later working for The Sunday Times as property correspondent and a business writer in 1969. She moved to radio in 1970, reporting for the BBC and the British Forces Broadcasting Service, and in 1973 was one of the founding members of London's news station London Broadcasting Company (LBC). She joined ITN the following year and quickly became a familiar presence on television screens. Along with Carol Barnes, Sarah Cullen and Sue Lloyd-Roberts, Thirkettle was one of the first female reporters to be seen on the broadcaster. Both Barnes and Thirkettle were recruited by editor Nigel Ryan, and the two were later known as "Ryan's Daughters".

During her career with the broadcaster, Thirkettle reported on more than 1,500 stories, including the famine in Ethiopia, Richard Branson's trans-oceanic ballooning and the artistic talent of autistic boy Stephen Wiltshire. She was a member of the ITN team which covered the 1994 death of Labour Party leader John Smith, which coverage won ITN a Royal Television Society Award. At the time of her death in 1996 she was considered to be one of the broadcaster's most experienced journalists. Thirkettle had covered more than 1,500 stories for ITN.

Away from television Thirkettle wrote short stories and studied natural history, politics and foreign affairs. She was also an occasional presenter on Classic FM.

She died in hospital aged 48 on 11 May 1996 after suffering from cancer.

== Personal life ==
Thirkettle was divorced from the publisher Jonathan Wallace (grandson of thriller writer Edgar Wallace) since 1986. She lived in Camden Town with her two children Daisy Wallace and Michael Wallace.
