= Sue Lloyd-Roberts =

British journalist

Sue Lloyd-Roberts CBE
- Born: Susan Ann Lloyd-Roberts; 27 October 1950; Belgravia, London, England
- Died: 13 October 2015 (aged 64); London, England
- Education: Cheltenham Ladies' College; St. Hilda's College, University of Oxford
- Occupations: Foreign correspondent, television journalist
- Notable credit(s): ITN, BBC News, Newsnight
- Website: Sue Lloyd-Roberts blog

Susan Ann Lloyd-Roberts CBE (27 October 1950 – 13 October 2015) was a British television journalist who contributed reports to BBC programmes and, earlier in her career, worked for ITN.

== Early life ==
Born in London in 1950, she was the daughter of an orthopedic surgeon George Lloyd-Roberts and Catherine (née Ray). She failed the 11-Plus examination.

== Education ==
Lloyd-Roberts was educated at Francis Holland School, an independent school for girls in central London, followed by Cheltenham Ladies College, a boarding independent school in the spa town of Cheltenham in Gloucestershire, followed by St Hilda's College at the University of Oxford (1970–73), where she read History and Modern Languages, graduating with a second-class BA Honours degree.

While at university, she worked on Isis, the student magazine.

== Career ==
She joined Britain's ITN, the news provider for ITV, straight from university and then reported extensively for the channel's News at Ten.

Lloyd-Roberts joined the BBC in 1992. She worked as a special correspondent, travelling to, and reporting on, major news stories across the world, including important issues not covered widely elsewhere. She presented many in-depth reports for the Newsnight programme and for Our World, the international current affairs series on BBC World News, its international satellite and cable news channel, as well as for the UK's domestic BBC News channel.

Lloyd-Roberts produced reports from states such as North Korea, Myanmar and Syria, where she focused on a range of important issues such as human rights violations, environmental degradation and political corruption.

== Illness and death ==
She announced on the Victoria Derbyshire programme she had been diagnosed with an aggressive form of leukaemia and urgently needed a donor with matching tissue type so she could have a stem cell transplant. Lloyd-Roberts confirmed she would be keeping a video diary for the programme. (In August 2015, Derbyshire was diagnosed with a different form of cancer, and also announced that she would keep a public vlog.)

Lloyd-Roberts died on 13 October 2015 at University College Hospital in London, aged 64.

== Personal life ==
She ran a hotel in Mallorca, Spain, with her husband Nick Guthrie, a BBC producer.

== Awards ==
- 1995: European Women of Achievement Award, European Union of Women (EUW), London.
- 2002: Member of the Order of the British Empire (MBE) in the 2002 New Year Honours for services to broadcast journalism.
- 2011: Emmy Award for her reports from North Korea.
- 2013: Commander of the Order of the British Empire (CBE) in the 2013 Birthday Honours for services to journalism.
