= Revelations (Gene album) =

Studio album by Gene
- Released: 1 March 1999
- Recorded: 1998
- Studios: Rockfield, Rockfield, Wales; Maison Rogue, London
- Length: 51:53
- Label: Polydor
- Producers: Hugh Jones, Gene

Gene chronology
Drawn to the Deep End (1997)	Revelations (1999)	Libertine (2001)

Singles from Revelations
- 1. "As Good as It Gets" Released: 8 February 1999; 2. "Fill Her Up" Released: 5 April 1999

Revelations is the third studio album by English rock band Gene. It was released on 1 March 1999 through Polydor Records. When they released their second studio album Drawn to the Deep End in 1997, it was a commercial success, but did not meet the label's expectations. Polydor was hesitant about letting them record another; sessions were mainly held at Rockfield Studios in Rockfield, Wales with producer Hugh Jones. The band produced one song at Maison Rogue in London. Revelations was compared to the band's debut studio album Olympian (1995), though lacked the Smiths influence found there. A few of the songs criticize British politicians, such as Tony Blair.

Revelations received mixed reviews from critics, some of whom commented on the production, while others highlighted frontman Martin Rossiter's lyrics. The album reached number 25 in the UK Albums Chart as the singles "As Good as It Gets" and "Fill Her Up" peaked at numbers 23 and 36, respectively. Preceded by a tour of the United Kingdom in late 1998, "As Good as It Gets" was released as the lead single from the album in February 1999. They went on a two-month UK tour leading up to the album's release; "Fill Her Up" was released as the album's second single in April 1999. Gene played a series of festivals in mainland Europe and Japan, as well as appearing at the Reading and Leeds Festivals in the UK.

== Background and recording ==
Gene released their second studio album Drawn to the Deep End in February 1997. It peaked at number eight on the UK Albums Chart; all of its singles peaked within the UK top 40, with "We Could Be Kings" reaching the highest at number 17. Despite the commercial success, the album received mixed reviews from music critics. The album ended up costing £200,000 to make; though it outsold the band's debut studio album Olympian (1995), their label Polydor Records had higher sales expectations. The label was hesitant about letting the band make another album, toying with the idea of dropping them from their roster. Revelations was produced for the most part by Hugh Jones, save for "The British Disease", which was produced by the band and worked on with engineer Ben Jones and assistant Raj Das.

The bulk of it was recorded at Rockfield Studios in Rockfield, Wales with assistant engineer Lee Butler; Phil Ault served as assistant engineer on "Something in the Water". "The British Disease" was recorded and mixed at Maison Rogue in London. Most of the recordings were mixed at Whitfield Street Recording Studios in London with mix engineer Roland Herrington. "Love Won't Work", "Mayday" and "You'll Never Walk Again" were mixed at The Pierce Rooms in London with assistant Neil Aldridge. Though the label told the band they only had a month to make the album, the recording and mixing process took seven weeks in total to complete. Ian Cooper then mastered the album at Metropolis Studios in London.

== Composition and lyrics ==
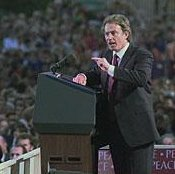
Tony Blair and New Labour were referenced in some of the songs on Revelations.

Revelations has been compared the band's earlier album Olympian, while stepping away from the latter's Smiths-influenced sound. Aidan Reynolds of Drowned in Sound wrote that the album "moves the band's palette from aggression to outright rage, stripping the songs back to their skeletal forms and adding political fury to Rossiter's already bright fire". It starts with "As Good as It Gets", which alludes to the British landscape under New Labour, and is followed by the darker-sounding "In Love with Love". "Love Won't Work" features horns from Roddy Lorimer, and is followed by "The British Disease", which critiques British Prime Minister Tony Blair and his cabinet, backed by music that evokes "What Difference Does It Make?" (1984) by the Smiths.

"Fill Her Up" features Spanish-lite horns, courtesy of Lorimer; "Something in the Water" is a slow-building song akin to the material on Drawn to the Deep End. "Mayday" make references to British politicians, namely Peter Mandelson and Aneurin Bevan. "Little Child" was inspired by Rossiter's daughter, and deals with having anxiety ahead of the birth of a firstborn. "Stop" comes across as the offspring of "Olympian" and "London, Can You Wait?", both tracks from Olympian. "The Police Will Never Find You" takes inspiration from the work of Faces, ending with a coda consisting of "la la la". The album concludes with the ballad "You'll Never Walk Again".

== Release ==
In October and November 1998, Gene embarked on a short tour of the UK, where they debuted material from their forthcoming album. Following this, they supported James on three of their UK headlining shows. On 23 January 1999, Revelations was announced for release in two months' time. "As Good as It Gets" was released as the album's lead single on 8 February 1999. Two versions were released on CD: the first with "Toasting the Union" and "Man on Earth", while the second featured "All Night" and "To All Who Sail on Her". In February and March 1999, the band toured the UK again, on a trek titled Revelations 1–26. Two of the shows had to be cancelled when Rossiter collapsed on stage.

Revelations was released by Polydor Records on 1 March 1999; the same day, the band promoted it with a performance at the flagship HMV store in London. "Fill Her Up" was released as the album's second single on 5 April 1999. Two versions were released on CD: the first with "Pass on to Me" and "Touched by the Hand of Havoc", while the second included "Common as Air" and "Slice". Two days after the single, the band announced they had left Polydor, with both parties coming to a mutual agreement. The following week, the band played a one-off secret show in London. In July 1999, they played festivals across mainland Europe and Japan, leading into two warm-up shows prior to appearances at the Reading and Leeds Festivals. Gene opened 2000 with a short UK tour; following this, they headlined the National Student Music Awards, where they were supported by Toploader.

Revelations was reissued in 2014 as a two-CD set, which included B-sides and a live set from Newcastle in October 1998. This version came about as the members were approached by Edsel Records; unlike other labels who only wanted to focus on Olympian, Edsel was interested in doing all of their albums. The standard version of the album re-appeared on CD and vinyl in 2020 as part of The Album box sets; the vinyl edition was released separately from the sets later in the year. "As Good as It Gets", "Fil Her Up", "Mayday" and "You'll Never Walk Again" were included on the band's second compilation album As Good as It Gets: The Best Of (2001). "The British Disease", "Something in the Water" and "The Police Will Never Find You" were included on the band's third compilation album The Collection (2006). "As Good as It Gets", "Fil Her Up", "Stop" and "You'll Never Walk Again" were included on the band's fourth compilation album Yours for the Taking (The Best Of) (2020).

== Reception ==
Professional ratings
Review scores
Source	Rating
AllMusic	3/5 stars
God Is in the TV	4/5
The Independent	1/5
The Line of Best Fit	3/10
NME	5/10

Revelations was met with mixed reviews from music critics. The Independent's Tim Perry said that even with a "slight revamp," Revelations was not "going to win many new fans, and unless you can tune into Martin Rossiter's often bleak world-view, this sounds very dated". AllMusic reviewer Andy Kellman thought Rossiter's lyrics were "focused more on politics than heartbreak". NME writer Johnny Cigarettes added that Rossiter's words were "more passionate, more angry, but somehow not as incisive as they have been". Alex Wisgard of The Line of Best Fit wrote that it "merely stands as a too-little-too-late exercise in A&R led music for the masses". He disliked the "intentionally-rough production" that "actually comes close to making the album sound almost demo-like". Kellman was surprised that Jones did not "add the graceful, rich luster" to it that he had to other releases from time period. Reynolds though that while the "production choices may have stemmed from budgetary constraints, they serve their subjects well".

Cigarettes wrote that Revelations showcased a band "who have run out of ideas, run out of energy and, worst of all, run out of tunes". Ben P Scott of God Is in the TV was more positive, calling it "flawed but occasionally awesome". He said it had "three below-par songs" that "don’t prevent the other ten from shining, even if a couple of them do take a few listens to have a real impact". Kellman thought the band "deserve credit for fearlessly maintaining an emotional edge that so few of their peers in the British scene lack or avoid". Clash's Gareth James saw it as an "intriguing collection, of leaner lineage than its predecessor", featuring "several of their very finest songs".

Revelations peaked at number 25 on the UK Albums Chart. "As Good as It Gets" reached number 23, while "Fill Her Up" charted at number 36.

== Track listing ==
All songs written by Gene.

1. "As Good as It Gets" – 4:12
2. "In Love with Love" – 3:13
3. "Love Won't Work" – 3:55
4. "The British Disease" – 4:12
5. "Fill Her Up" – 3:10
6. "Something in the Water" – 4:13
7. "Mayday" – 3:24
8. "Angel" – 4:34
9. "The Looker" – 3:17
10. "Little Child" – 3:40
11. "Stop" – 2:56
12. "The Police Will Never Find You" – 4:59
13. "You'll Never Walk Again" – 6:08

== Personnel ==
Personnel per booklet.

Gene

- Martin Rossiter – vocals, keyboards
- Steve Mason – guitars
- Kevin Miles – bass
- Matt James – drums, guitar

Additional musicians

- Roddy Lorimer – trumpet (tracks 3 and 5)

Production and design

- Hugh Jones – producer (all except track 4)
- Roland Herrington – mix engineer (all except track 4)
- Gene – producer (track 4)
- Ben Jones – engineer (track 4)
- Raj Das – assistant (track 4)
- Lee Butler – assistant engineer (all except track 6)
- Phil Ault – assistant engineer (track 6)
- Neil Aldridge – assistant (tracks 3, 7 and 13)
- Ian Cooper – mastering
- Pat Pope – band photography
- Laurence Stevens – art direction, design

== Charts ==
Chart performance for Revelations
Chart (1999)	Peak position
UK Albums (Official Charts)	25
