= List of UK top-ten albums in 1997 =

The UK Albums Chart is one of many music charts compiled by the Official Charts Company that calculates the best-selling albums of the week in the United Kingdom. Before 2004, the chart was only based on the sales of physical albums. This list shows albums that peaked in the Top 10 of the UK Albums Chart during 1997, as well as albums which peaked in 1996 and 1998 but were in the top 10 in 1997. The entry date is when the album appeared in the top ten for the first time (week ending, as published by the Official Charts Company, which is six days after the chart is announced).

The first new number-one album of the year was Evita: The Complete Motion Picture Music Soundtrack by Madonna and Various artists. Overall, twenty different albums peaked at number-one in 1997, with twenty unique artists hitting that position.

== Background ==
=== Best-selling albums ===
Oasis had the best-selling album of the year with Be Here Now. Urban Hymns by The Verve came in second place Spice by the Spice Girls, Spiceworld by the Spice Girls and White on Blonde by Texas made up the top five. Albums by The Prodigy, Celine Dion, Radiohead, Eternal and Wham! were also in the top-ten best selling albums of the year.

== Top-ten albums ==
Key

Symbol	Meaning
‡	Album peaked in 1996 but still in chart in 1997.
♦	Album released in 1997 but peaked in 1998.
(#)	Year-end top-ten album position and rank
Entered	The date that the album first appeared in the chart.
Peak	Highest position that the album reached in the UK Albums Chart.

Entered (week ending)	Weeks in top 10	Single	Artist	Peak	Peak reached (week ending)	Weeks at peak
Albums in 1996
16 March 1996	29	Ocean Drive	Lighthouse Family	3	8 March 1997	1
23 March 1996	41	Falling into You ‡	Celine Dion	1	23 March 1996	1
25 May 1996	35	Older ‡	George Michael	1	25 May 1996	3
1 June 1996	16	Everything Must Go ‡	Manic Street Preachers	2	1 June 1996	2
1 June 1996	31	The Score ‡	The Fugees	2	5 October 1996	1
14 September 1996	4	Coming Up ‡	Suede	1	14 September 1996	1
21 September 1996	17	Travelling Without Moving ‡	Jamiroquai	2	21 September 1996	2
28 September 1996	10	K ‡	Kula Shaker	1	28 September 1996	2
12 October 1996	6	Sheryl Crow ‡	Sheryl Crow	5	12 October 1996	3
19 October 1996	16	Greatest Hits ‡	Simply Red	1	19 October 1996	2
19 October 1996	3	Stoosh ‡	Skunk Anansie	9	19 October 1996	2
2 November 1996	22	Blue Is the Colour ‡	The Beautiful South	1	2 November 1996	1
9 November 1996	9	A Different Beat ‡	Boyzone	1	9 November 1996	1
9 November 1996	10	Evita: The Complete Motion Picture Music Soundtrack	Madonna and Various artists	1	1 February 1997	1
16 November 1996	43	Spice ‡	Spice Girls	1	16 November 1996	15
23 November 1996	7	Take Two ‡	Robson & Jerome	1	23 November 1996	2
Albums in 1997
25 January 1997	1	Secrets	Toni Braxton	10	25 January 1997	1
1 February 1997	1	Razorblade Suitcase	Bush	4	1 February 1997	1
1 February 1997	1	Homework	Daft Punk	8	1 February 1997	1
8 February 1997	5	Glow	Reef	1	8 February 1997	1
8 February 1997	12	Tragic Kingdom	No Doubt	3	12 April 1997	1
15 February 1997	42	White on Blonde	Texas	1	15 February 1997	2
15 February 1997	1	Placebo	Placebo	5	15 February 1997	1
15 February 1997	1	Earthling	David Bowie	6	15 February 1997	1
22 February 1997	5	Blur	Blur	1	22 February 1997	1
22 February 1997	3	Hits '97 Volume 1	The Smurfs	2	1 March 1997	1
1 March 1997	2	Attack of the Grey Lantern	Mansun	1	1 March 1997	1
1 March 1997	1	Drawn to the Deep End	Gene	8	1 March 1997	1
8 March 1997	1	Beautiful Freak	Eels	5	8 March 1997	1
8 March 1997	1	Whiplash	James	9	8 March 1997	1
15 March 1997	5	Pop	U2	1	15 March 1997	1
15 March 1997	2	B-sides, Seasides and Freerides	Ocean Colour Scene	4	15 March 1997	1
15 March 1997	4	The Very Best of the Bee Gees	Bee Gees	6	15 March 1997	1
15 March 1997	1	The Healing Game	Van Morrison	10	15 March 1997	1
22 March 1997	4	Still Waters	Bee Gees	2	22 March 1997	2
22 March 1997	2	Nine Lives	Aerosmith	4	22 March 1997	1
29 March 1997	9	Before the Rain	Eternal	3	29 March 1997	1
5 April 1997	3	Lisa Stansfield	Lisa Stansfield	2	5 April 1997	1
12 April 1997	4	10	Wet Wet Wet	2	12 April 1997	1
12 April 1997	1	Cowboy	Erasure	10	12 April 1997	1
19 April 1997	4	Dig Your Own Hole	The Chemical Brothers	1	19 April 1997	1
26 April 1997	3	Ultra	Depeche Mode	1	26 April 1997	1
26 April 1997	2	Mother Nature Calls	Cast	3	26 April 1997	1
26 April 1997	1	Share My World	Mary J. Blige	8	26 April 1997	1
26 April 1997	1	Come Find Yourself	Fun Lovin' Criminals	7	26 July 1997	2
3 May 1997	4	Tellin' Stories	The Charlatans	1	3 May 1997	2
3 May 1997	4	In It for the Money	Supergrass	2	3 May 1997	1
3 May 1997	1	Shelter	The Brand New Heavies	5	3 May 1997	1
10 May 1997	6	Republica	Republica	4	31 May 1997	1
17 May 1997	3	Flaming Pie	Paul McCartney	2	17 May 1997	1
17 May 1997	1	Andromeda Heights	Prefab Sprout	7	17 May 1997	1
17 May 1997	1	It Doesn't Matter Anymore	The Supernaturals	9	17 May 1997	1
24 May 1997	4	Blood on the Dance Floor: HIStory in the Mix	Michael Jackson	1	24 May 1997	2
24 May 1997	2	The Colour and the Shape	Foo Fighters	3	24 May 1997	1
24 May 1997	1	At the Club	Kenickie	9	24 May 1997	1
31 May 1997	5	Romanza	Andrea Bocelli	6	7 June 1997	1
7 June 1997	3	Open Road	Gary Barlow	1	7 June 1997	1
7 June 1997	6	Do It Yourself	The Seahorses	2	7 June 1997	1
7 June 1997	9	Always on My Mind: The Ultimate Love Songs Collection	Elvis Presley	3	21 June 1997	1
7 June 1997	1	Direction Reaction Creation	The Jam	8	7 June 1997	1
14 June 1997	1	Wu-Tang Forever	Wu-Tang Clan	1	14 June 1997	1
14 June 1997	4	Timeless	Sarah Brightman	2	21 June 1997	1
14 June 1997	4	The Best of Bob Dylan	Bob Dylan	6	21 June 1997	1
21 June 1997	3	Middle of Nowhere	Hanson	1	21 June 1997	1
21 June 1997	1	Album of the Year	Faith No More	7	21 June 1997	1
28 June 1997	19	OK Computer	Radiohead	1	28 June 1997	2
28 June 1997	3	Destination Anywhere	Jon Bon Jovi	2	28 June 1997	1
28 June 1997	1	Ladies and Gentlemen We Are Floating in Space	Spiritualized	4	28 June 1997	1
28 June 1997	1	EV3	En Vogue	9	28 June 1997	1
5 July 1997	6	Heavy Soul	Paul Weller	2	5 July 1997	1
12 July 1997	13	The Fat of the Land	The Prodigy	1	12 July 1997	6
12 July 1997	1	Some Other Sucker's Parade	Del Amitri	6	12 July 1997	1
12 July 1997	1	Guns in the Ghetto	UB40	7	12 July 1997	1
19 July 1997	2	Vanishing Point	Primal Scream	2	19 July 1997	1
19 July 1997	5	The Best of Michael Jackson & Jackson 5ive	Michael Jackson and The Jackson 5	5	26 July 1997	1
19 July 1997	2	Essentials	David Gates and Bread	9	26 July 1997	1
26 July 1997	1	Evergreen	Echo & the Bunnymen	8	26 July 1997	1
2 August 1997	1	Songs from Northern Britain	Teenage Fanclub	3	2 August 1997	1
9 August 1997	2	No Way Out	Puff Daddy & The Family	8	16 August 1997	1
16 August 1997	4	Love is For Ever	Billy Ocean	7	16 August 1997	2
23 August 1997	9	Backstreet's Back	Backstreet Boys	2	23 August 1997	1
23 August 1997	3	Blurring the Edges	Meredith Brooks	5	23 August 1997	1
23 August 1997	1	Maladjusted	Morrissey	8	23 August 1997	1
30 August 1997	11	Be Here Now	Oasis	1	30 August 1997	5
6 September 1997	2	Mouth to Mouth	Levellers	5	6 September 1997	1
6 September 1997	1	Word Gets Around	Stereophonics	6	6 September 1997	1
6 September 1997	1	Radiator	Super Furry Animals	8	6 September 1997	1
13 September 1997	3	Calling All Stations	Genesis	2	13 September 1997	1
13 September 1997	3	Much Love	Shola Ama	6	13 September 1997	1
20 September 1997	3	Butterfly	Mariah Carey	2	20 September 1997	1
20 September 1997	1	New Forms	Roni Size/Reprazent	8	20 September 1997	1
20 September 1997	1	Good Feeling	Travis	9	20 September 1997	1
27 September 1997	4	Marchin' Already	Ocean Colour Scene	1	27 September 1997	1
27 September 1997	1	The Very Best of Supertramp	Supertramp	8	27 September 1997	1
4 October 1997	8	Maverick a Strike	Finlay Quaye	3	4 October 1997	1
4 October 1997	1	Homogenic	Björk	4	4 October 1997	1
4 October 1997	1	Static & Silence	The Sundays	10	4 October 1997	1
11 October 1997	42	Urban Hymns	The Verve	1	11 October 1997	12
11 October 1997	3	Portishead	Portishead	2	11 October 1997	1
11 October 1997	4	The Big Picture	Elton John	3	11 October 1997	2
11 October 1997	1	Bridges to Babylon	The Rolling Stones	6	11 October 1997	1
11 October 1997	1	The Love Songs	Chris de Burgh	8	11 October 1997	1
11 October 1997	1	Time Out of Mind	Bob Dylan	10	11 October 1997	1
18 October 1997	1	Woman in Me	Louise	5	18 October 1997	1
18 October 1997	1	The Velvet Rope	Janet Jackson	6	18 October 1997	1
18 October 1997	1	Sci-Fi Lullabies	Suede	9	18 October 1997	1
18 October 1997	2	The Nail File: The Best of Jimmy Nail	Jimmy Nail	8	25 October 1997	1
25 October 1997	7	Fresco	M People	2	25 October 1997	1
25 October 1997	1	Pleased to Meet You	Sleeper	7	25 October 1997	1
25 October 1997	1	The Very Best of The Jam	The Jam	9	25 October 1997	1
1 November 1997	25	Postcards from Heaven	Lighthouse Family	2	1 November 1997	2
1 November 1997	12	Greatest Hits	Eternal	2	8 November 1997	1
1 November 1997	3	It's My Life – The Album	Sash!	6	1 November 1997	2
1 November 1997	56	Talk on Corners ♦	The Corrs	1	27 June 1998	10
1 November 1997	3	Their Greatest Hits	Hot Chocolate	10	1 November 1997	3
8 November 1997	6	Lennon Legend: The Very Best of John Lennon	John Lennon	4	8 November 1997	1
15 November 1997	11	Spiceworld	Spice Girls	1	15 November 1997	3
15 November 1997	7	Paint the Sky with Stars: The Best of Enya	Enya	4	15 November 1997	2
15 November 1997	2	Queen Rocks	Queen	7	15 November 1997	1
22 November 1997	8	Like You Do... Best of The Lightning Seeds	The Lightning Seeds	5	22 November 1997	1
29 November 1997	29	Let's Talk About Love	Celine Dion	1	29 November 1997	5
29 November 1997	1	Reload	Metallica	4	29 November 1997	1
6 December 1997	7	The Best of Wham!: If You Were There...	Wham!	4	6 December 1997	5
6 December 1997	15	Left of the Middle	Natalie Imbruglia	5	6 December 1997	1
13 December 1997	23	All Saints ♦	All Saints	2	17 January 1998	3

== See also ==
- 1997 in British music
- List of number-one albums from the 1990s (UK)
