= List of UK top-ten albums in 1995 =

The UK Albums Chart is one of many music charts compiled by the Official Charts Company that calculates the best-selling albums of the week in the United Kingdom. Before 2004, the chart was only based on the sales of physical albums. This list shows albums that peaked in the Top 10 of the UK Albums Chart during 1995, as well as albums which peaked in 1994 and 1996 but were in the top 10 in 1995. The entry date is when the album appeared in the top ten for the first time (week ending, as published by the Official Charts Company, which is six days after the chart is announced).

The first new number-one album of the year was The Colour of My Love by Celine Dion. Overall, twenty-seven different albums peaked at number-one in 1995, with twenty-seven unique artists hitting that position.

== Background ==
=== Best-selling albums ===
Robson & Jerome had the best-selling album of the year with Robson & Jerome. (What's the Story) Morning Glory? by Oasis came in second place. The Colour of My Love by Celine Dion, Life by Simply Red and HIStory: Past, Present and Future, Book I by Michael Jackson made up the top five. Albums by Queen, Paul Weller, Wet Wet Wet, Blur and Pulp were also in the top-ten best selling albums of the year.

== Top-ten albums ==
Key

Symbol	Meaning
‡	Album peaked in 1994 but still in chart in 1995.
♦	Album released in 1994 or 1995 but peaked in 1996.
(#)	Year-end top-ten album position and rank
Entered	The date that the album first appeared in the chart.
Peak	Highest position that the album reached in the UK Albums Chart.

Entered (week ending)	Weeks in top 10	Single	Artist	Peak	Peak reached (week ending)	Weeks at peak
Albums in 1994
29 January 1994	24	Always & Forever	Eternal	2	7 January 1995	3
5 March 1994	32	The Colour of My Love	Celine Dion	1	28 January 1995	7
7 May 1994	36	Parklife ‡	Blur	1	7 May 1994	1
4 June 1994	12	Seal (1994) ‡	Seal	1	4 June 1994	2
10 September 1994	25	Definitely Maybe ‡	Oasis	1	10 September 1994	1
15 October 1994	22	No Need to Argue ‡	The Cranberries	2	15 October 1994	1
22 October 1994	15	Cross Road ‡	Bon Jovi	1	22 October 1994	5
29 October 1994	9	Steam ‡	East 17	3	31 December 1994	3
19 November 1994	9	Fields of Gold: The Best of Sting 1984–1994 ‡	Sting	2	19 November 1994	1
19 November 1994	18	Carry on up the Charts: The Best of The Beautiful South ‡	The Beautiful South	1	3 December 1994	7
26 November 1994	26	Bizarre Fruit ♦	M People	3	17 February 1996	3
3 December 1994	4	The Best of New Order ‡	New Order	4	3 December 1994	1
10 December 1994	5	Live at the BBC ‡	The Beatles	1	10 December 1994	1
17 December 1994	14	Crocodile Shoes (Original Songs from the BBC Television Serial) ‡	Jimmy Nail	2	24 December 1994	2
Albums in 1995
7 January 1995	2	Psyche – The Album	PJ & Duncan	5	7 January 1995	1
21 January 1995	13	Dummy	Portishead	2	6 May 1995	1
28 January 1995	1	University	Throwing Muses	10	28 January 1995	1
4 February 1995	1	Behind Closed Doors	Thunder	5	4 February 1995	1
4 February 1995	1	Octopus	The Human League	6	4 February 1995	1
4 February 1995	1	Balance	Van Halen	8	4 February 1995	1
4 February 1995	10	Pan Pipe Moods	Free The Spirit	2	18 February 1995	2
11 February 1995	3	Good News from the Next World	Simple Minds	2	11 February 1995	1
11 February 1995	3	Leftism	Leftfield	3	11 February 1995	1
11 February 1995	1	Waiting for the Punchline	Extreme	10	11 February 1995	1
18 February 1995	2	Greatest Hits	Bob Seger & the Silver Bullet Band	6	18 February 1995	1
18 February 1995	1	Worry Bomb	Carter the Unstoppable Sex Machine	9	18 February 1995	1
25 February 1995	1	Smart	Sleeper	5	25 February 1995	1
25 February 1995	1	King	Belly	6	25 February 1995	1
4 March 1995	1	Maxinquaye	Tricky	3	4 March 1995	1
4 March 1995	1	Singles	The Smiths	5	4 March 1995	1
11 March 1995	12	Greatest Hits	Bruce Springsteen	1	11 March 1995	2
11 March 1995	2	Twisted	Del Amitri	3	11 March 1995	1
18 March 1995	12	Medusa	Annie Lennox	1	18 March 1995	1
18 March 1995	2	Galore	Kirsty MacColl	6	18 March 1995	1
18 March 1995	1	Beggar on a Beach of Gold	Mike and the Mechanics	9	18 March 1995	1
25 March 1995	5	Elastica	Elastica	1	25 March 1995	1
25 March 1995	1	King for a Day... Fool for a Lifetime	Faith No More	5	25 March 1995	1
25 March 1995	5	The Bends ♦	Radiohead	4	10 February 1996	1
25 March 1995	1	Conversation Peace	Stevie Wonder	8	25 March 1995	1
1 April 1995	3	Made in England	Elton John	3	1 April 1995	1
1 April 1995	1	Olympian	Gene	8	1 April 1995	1
8 April 1995	3	Wake Up!	The Boo Radleys	1	8 April 1995	1
8 April 1995	1	Subhuman Race	Skid Row	8	8 April 1995	1
15 April 1995	4	The Choir (Music from the BBC Television Series)	Anthony Way and Stanislas Syrewicz	3	22 April 1995	1
22 April 1995	18	Picture This	Wet Wet Wet	1	22 April 1995	3
29 April 1995	1	MTV Unplugged	Bob Dylan	10	29 April 1995	1
13 May 1995	11	Nobody Else	Take That	1	13 May 1995	2
13 May 1995	1	Chas & Dave's Street Party	Chas & Dave	3	13 May 1995	1
20 May 1995	1	Another Night (U.S. Album)	Real McCoy	6	20 May 1995	1
20 May 1995	1	Pan Pipe	Inspirations	10	20 May 1995	1
27 May 1995	24	Stanley Road	Paul Weller	1	27 May 1995	1
27 May 1995	11	I Should Coco	Supergrass	1	29 July 1995	3
27 May 1995	2	The Complete Stone Roses	The Stone Roses	4	27 May 1995	1
3 June 1995	10	Singles	Alison Moyet	1	3 June 1995	1
3 June 1995	3	Natural Mystic: The Legend Lives On	Bob Marley and the Wailers	5	3 June 1995	1
3 June 1995	1	P.H.U.Q.	The Wildhearts	6	3 June 1995	1
3 June 1995	1	Tuesday Night Music Club	Sheryl Crow	8	3 June 1995	1
10 June 1995	6	Pulse	Pink Floyd	1	10 June 1995	2
10 June 1995	3	A Spanner in the Works	Rod Stewart	4	17 June 1995	1
10 June 1995	1	Grand Prix	Teenage Fanclub	7	10 June 1995	1
17 June 1995	1	Big Love	Ali Campbell	6	17 June 1995	1
24 June 1995	22	HIStory: Past, Present and Future, Book I	Michael Jackson	1	24 June 1995	1
24 June 1995	4	Post	Björk	2	24 June 1995	1
24 June 1995	2	Days Like This	Van Morrison	5	24 June 1995	1
24 June 1995	1	Infernal Love	Therapy?	9	24 June 1995	1
1 July 1995	8	These Days	Bon Jovi	1	1 July 1995	4
1 July 1995	1	Replenish	Reef	9	1 July 1995	1
8 July 1995	2	Foo Fighters	Foo Fighters	3	8 July 1995	1
8 July 1995	2	Mirror Ball	Neil Young	4	8 July 1995	1
8 July 1995	1	Exit Planet Dust	The Chemical Brothers	9	8 July 1995	1
22 July 1995	1	Gorgeous George	Edwyn Collins	8	22 July 1995	1
29 July 1995	1	The Show, the After Party, the Hotel	Jodeci	4	29 July 1995	1
29 July 1995	5	Sax Moods	Blowing Free	6	5 August 1995	1
12 August 1995	1	La Carretera	Julio Iglesias	6	12 August 1995	1
19 August 1995	4	It's Great When You're Straight...Yeah	Black Grape	1	19 August 1995	2
19 August 1995	1	Alternative	Pet Shop Boys	2	19 August 1995	1
19 August 1995	1	Timeless	Goldie	7	19 August 1995	1
26 August 1995	9	CrazySexyCool	TLC	4	23 September 1995	1
2 September 1995	10	Said and Done	Boyzone	1	2 September 1995	1
9 September 1995	3	The Charlatans	The Charlatans	1	9 September 1995	1
9 September 1995	3	Zeitgeist	Levellers	1	16 September 1995	1
9 September 1995	1	Southpaw Grammar	Morrissey	4	9 September 1995	1
16 September 1995	1	Take Me Higher	Diana Ross	10	16 September 1995	1
23 September 1995	7	The Great Escape	Blur	1	23 September 1995	2
23 September 1995	2	One Hot Minute	Red Hot Chili Peppers	2	23 September 1995	1
23 September 1995	1	Circus	Lenny Kravitz	5	23 September 1995	1
30 September 1995	5	Greatest Hits (1985–1995)	Michael Bolton	2	30 September 1995	2
30 September 1995	1	On	Echobelly	4	30 September 1995	1
30 September 1995	1	World	D:Ream	5	30 September 1995	1
30 September 1995	1	Paranoid & Sunburnt	Skunk Anansie	8	30 September 1995	1
30 September 1995	2	Pan Pipe Dreams	Inspirations	10	30 September 1995	2
7 October 1995	5	Daydream	Mariah Carey	1	7 October 1995	1
7 October 1995	1	The Gold Experience	Prince	4	7 October 1995	1
7 October 1995	1	Ballbreaker	AC/DC	6	7 October 1995	1
7 October 1995	1	D'eux	Celine Dion	7	7 October 1995	1
7 October 1995	1	Outside	David Bowie	8	7 October 1995	1
14 October 1995	51	(What's the Story) Morning Glory?	Oasis	1	14 October 1995	10
14 October 1995	6	Design of a Decade: 1986–1996	Janet Jackson	2	14 October 1995	1
14 October 1995	2	All You Can Eat	k.d. lang	7	14 October 1995	1
14 October 1995	1	The X Factor	Iron Maiden	8	14 October 1995	1
21 October 1995	15	Life	Simply Red	1	21 October 1995	3
21 October 1995	1	Insomniac	Green Day	8	21 October 1995	1
28 October 1995	3	The Very Best of Robert Palmer	Robert Palmer	4	28 October 1995	1
28 October 1995	3	All Change	Cast	7	28 October 1995	1
28 October 1995	2	Chants and Dances of the Native Americans	Sacred Spirit	9	4 November 1995	1
4 November 1995	3	Vault: Def Leppard Greatest Hits (1980–1995)	Def Leppard	3	4 November 1995	1
4 November 1995	1	Mellon Collie and the Infinite Sadness	The Smashing Pumpkins	4	4 November 1995	1
4 November 1995	1	Don't Bore Us, Get to the Chorus! Roxette's Greatest Hits	Roxette	5	4 November 1995	1
11 November 1995	23	Different Class	Pulp	1	11 November 1995	1
11 November 1995	5	Welcome to the Neighbourhood	Meat Loaf	3	11 November 1995	1
11 November 1995	4	Power of a Woman	Eternal	6	11 November 1995	1
18 November 1995	10	Made in Heaven	Queen	1	18 November 1995	1
18 November 1995	12	Something to Remember	Madonna	3	18 November 1995	1
18 November 1995	8	Love Songs	Elton John	4	16 December 1995	1
18 November 1995	11	Big River	Jimmy Nail	8	18 November 1995	1
25 November 1995	13	Robson & Jerome	Robson & Jerome	1	25 November 1995	7
25 November 1995	2	Up All Night	East 17	7	25 November 1995	1
25 November 1995	1	Stripped	The Rolling Stones	9	25 November 1995	1
2 December 1995	3	Anthology 1	The Beatles	2	2 December 1995	1
2 December 1995	8	The Memory of Trees	Enya	5	9 December 1995	1

== See also ==
- 1995 in British music
- List of number-one albums from the 1990s (UK)
