= Libertine (Gene album) =

Studio album by Gene
- Released: 22 October 2001
- Recorded: 2001
- Studios: Chapel, Lincolnshire; The Barge, Twickenham; Westside, London; Townhouse, London; BFD, London
- Length: 53:35
- Label: Contra
- Producers: Hugh Jones, Stephen Street

Gene chronology
Revelations (1999)	Libertine (2001)

Singles from Libertine
- 1. "Is It Over?" Released: 8 October 2001; 2. "Does He Have a Name?" Released: 28 January 2002

Libertine is the fourth and final studio album by English rock band Gene. It was released on 22 October 2001 though their own label Contra. After departing from their previous label Polydor Records in 1999, the band spent sometime writing material. Their next album was recorded across various studios in Lincolnshire, Twickenham and London. Hugh Jones served as the producer on nearly all of the songs, bar one that was produced by Stephen Street. Libertine focusses on piano instrumentation, taking influence from soul music, namely What's Going On (1971) by Marvin Gaye.

Libertine received generally favourable reviews from critics, some of whom commented on the quality of the songs. The album reached number 92 in the UK Albums Chart. Ahead of the album's release, "Is It Over?" appeared as its lead single in October 2001. Around this time, Gene embarked on a tour of the United Kingdom. "Does He Have a Name?" was released as the second single from the album in January 2002. Libertine has been reissued on CD and vinyl over the years; four songs from it appeared on the band's fourth compilation album Yours for the Taking (The Best Of) (2020).

== Background ==
Gene released their third studio album Revelations in March 1999. It peaked at number 25 on the UK Albums Chart; out of its two singles, "As Good as It Gets" reaching the highest at number 23. The following month, the band announced they had left their label Polydor Records, with both parties coming to a mutual agreement. In the same announcement, they revealed they were working on songs for their next album. In June 2000, the band played the United States for the first time in three years; the occasion was livestreamed over the internet. A live album, titled Rising for Sunset, was released on their label Contra later in the month. This was followed by one-off shows in New York City and Tunbridge Wells.

Libertine was recorded at Chapel Studios in Lincolnshire, The Barge in Twickenham, Westside Studios in London, Townhouse Studios in London and BFD Studios in London. Hugh Jones produced nearly all of the songs, bar "You", which was produced by Stephen Street. Ewan Davies (with assistance from Will Bartle), Kenny Patterson and Cenzo Townsend served as engineers throughout the sessions. Recording concluded by May 2001. Jones mixed almost every track, save for "Does He Have a Name?", "Yours for the Taking" and "You"; the latter two were done by Street, while Michael Fayne and Jamie Maher handled "Does He Have a Name?". Kevin Metcalf then mastered the album at The Soundmaster Studios in London.

== Composition ==
Libertine places more of an emphasis on piano, and takes influence from 1960s soul music and What's Going On (1971) by Marvin Gaye. Neil Hodge of Louder Than War said it was an "atmospheric album that is a perfect example of late night listening including strings, Hammond organ, slide guitars and ventures into reggae". It opens with the seven-minute chamber pop song "Does He Have a Name?", where a lover ponders who his ex will get with next. "Is It Over?" comes across as a rewrite of "Nothing Compares 2 U" (1990) by Sinéad O'Connor, and is followed by the sophisti-pop song "O Lover". "Let Me Rest" touches on soul-pop in the vein of the Style Council; Ink 19 writer Stein Haukland said it concludes in a "frenzy of uncontrolled [...] guitar riffing and a furious Hammond organ solo". "We'll Get What We Deserve" dabbles with reggae-blues, and talks about people who no longer listen to the band. "Walking in the Shallows" evokes "You're My Best Friend" (1976) by Queen, while its chorus recalls the work of the Smiths. "Yours for the Taking" is indebted to the work of the Jam and the new wave direction of Talk Talk, circa It's My Life (1984). "Spy in the Clubs" evokes the sound of Soft Cell. The album's closing track "Somewhere in the World" previously appeared on Rising for Sunset.

== Release ==
Gene released the stop-gap As Good as It Gets: The Best Of compilation album in May 2001. In July 2001, Gene played a one-off show at the London Astoria. On 16 August 2001, Libertine was announced for release in two months' time. A few days later, they played a one-off show in Wrexham, Wales prior to appearing at the Reading and Leeds Festivals. "Is It Over?" was released as the album's lead single on 8 October 2001, featuring "Supermarket Bombscare", "Little Diamond" and "Who Said This Was the End?". It was promoted with a short film by Irvine Welsh. Libertine was released on 22 October 2001 through Contra. It was promoted with a tour of the United Kingdom in October and November 2001; three of the shows were postponed when Rossiter started suffering from a throat infection. "Does He Have a Name?" was released as the album's second single on 28 January 2002, featuring "From Georgia to Osaka", "Welcome to Dover", "With Love in Mind" and an edit of "Does He Have a Name?". The 2002 European and US editions of Libertine were co-released through iMusic, a label started by former employee Matt Geiger; "Let Me Move On", "With Love in Mind", "From Georgia to Osaka", and "Who Said This Was the End?" were included as bonus tracks.

Libertine was reissued in 2014 as a two-CD set, which included B-sides, demos and previously unreleased songs. This version came about as the members were approached by Edsel Records; unlike other labels who only wanted to focus on their debut studio album Olympian (1995), Edsel was interested in doing all of their albums. Drummer Matt James was excited by this prospect as he thought Libertine had some of their best songs, and it would allow the album to reach a wider audience than on its initial release. Though the rights to the others were owned by the Universal Music Group, the band owned Libertine, which allowed them to include unreleased extras. The standard version of the album re-appeared on CD and vinyl in 2020 as part of The Album box sets; the vinyl edition was released separately from the sets later in the year. "Is It Over?", "O Lover", "Yours for the Taking" and "Somewhere in the World" were included on the band's fourth compilation album Yours for the Taking (The Best Of) (2020).

== Reception ==
Professional ratings
Aggregate scores
Source	Rating
Metacritic	66/100
Review scores
Source	Rating
AllMusic	3/5 stars
The Boston Phoenix	3/5 stars
God Is in the TV	4/5
The Line of Best Fit	8/10
NME	3.5/5 stars

Libertine was met with generally favourable from music critics. At Metacritic, which assigns a normalized rating out of 100 to reviews from mainstream publications, the album received an average score of 66, based on five reviews.

AllMusic reviewer Jack Rabid said that while it did not stand up to their first two albums, it was an upgrade from Revelations, adding that it was the "sort of LP that is rarely made by anyone anymore: one that engages every ounce of empathy one possesses". He liked that Jones "corrected the rare small botch he made of Revelations, restoring the dollops of shiny radiance and vigor" with Libertine. Ben P Scott of God Is in the TV found it to be a "more relaxed affair" compared to Revelations. Despite it focussing a "bit heavily on the ballads overall, ‘Libertine’ is undoubtedly a strong finish from the four piece". Journalist Annie Zaleski said in a review for The Boston Phoenix that it took a "more subdued approach" than their past releases, as the "once so overt choruses are now few and far between". NME's Victoria Segal said it was an album "about emotional resilience and it’s very strong indeed". Clash writer Gareth James saw it as a "cohesive collection of songs that glisten and enthral".

Haukland felt that the album would "grow on you and reveal a subtle and beautifully crafted effort from one of the most consistently good bands out there". Aidan Reynolds of Drowned in Sound noted that it "may have been roundly ignored, but it also contains some of the best music the band ever wrote". He added that there was a "real case to be made that Libertine is Gene's best album, a couple of questionable excursions into dub and reggae aside". The Line of Best Fit writer Alex Wisgard said the band made their "most experimental album without a trace of self-consciousness", with Rossiter's lyrics "return[ing] inward, as his band’s music expanded". PopMatters contributor David Medsker thought the album was "considerably better than one would expect", though it lacked the "guitar punch of their earlier work".

Libertine peaked at number 92 on the UK Albums Chart.

== Track listing ==
All songs written by Gene.

1. "Does He Have a Name?" – 7:16
2. "A Simple Request" – 3:49
3. "Is It Over?" – 4:42
4. "O Lover" – 5:58
5. "Let Me Rest" – 6:13
6. "We'll Get What We Deserve" – 4:51
7. "Walking in the Shallows" – 2:54
8. "Yours for the Taking" – 6:25
9. "You" – 4:05
10. "Spy in the Clubs" – 4:16
11. "Somewhere in the World" – 3:03

== Personnel ==
Personnel per booklet.

Gene

- Martin Rossiter – vocals, keyboards
- Steve Mason – guitars
- Kevin Miles – bass
- Matt James – drums, percussion

Additional musicians

- The Tippett Quartet – strings

Production and design

- Hugh Jones – producer (all except track 9), mixing (all except tracks 1, 8 and 9)
- Stephen Street – producer (track 9), mixing (tracks 8 and 9)
- Michael Fayne – mixing (track 1)
- Jamie Maher – mixing (track 1)
- Ewan Davies – engineer
- Will Bartle – assistant
- Kenny Patterson – engineer
- Cenzo Townsend – engineer
- Kevin Metcalf – mastering
- Chris Floyd – photos
- Acme – design
- Laura Bailey – cover star
