= The Defenestration of St Martin =

The Defenestration of St. Martin

Studio album by Martin Rossiter
- Released: December 3, 2012
- Length: 42:50
- Label: Drop Anchor Music

The Defenestration of St. Martin is the debut album by former Gene lead singer Martin Rossiter, released in November 2012 through Pledge Music. The album features Rossiter accompanying himself on piano.

== Track listing ==
No.	Title	Length
1.	"Three Points on a Compass"	10:05
2.	"I Want to Choose When I Sleep Alone"	3:49
3.	"No One Left to Blame"	4:40
4.	"Sing It Loud"	2:25
5.	"Where There Are Pixels"	5:08
6.	"I Must Be Jesus"	3:22
7.	"My Heart's Designed for Pumping Blood"	2:46
8.	"Drop Anchor"	3:52
9.	"Darling Sorrow"	3:01
10.	"Let the Waves Carry You"	3:46
Total length:		42:50

== Reception ==
Professional ratings
Aggregate scores
Source	Rating
Metacritic	83/100
Review scores
Source	Rating
AllMusic	3.5/5 stars
Clash	9/10
Drowned in Sound	8/10
The Independent	4/5 stars
The Guardian	4/5 stars
Mojo	4/5 stars
musicOMH	4/5 stars
PopMatters	8/10
Q	4/5 stars
Uncut	8/10

The album has received widespread critical acclaim, scoring 83/100 on Metacritic. The Guardian described it as "an unlikely but often brilliant comeback". David Quantick at the BBC noted that "Rossiter’s voice, which has developed into a mature but still dramatic thing, [is] capable of conveying powerful emotion as well as sharp observation".

== Personnel ==
- Martin Rossiter - Vocals, Keyboards
