= List of UK top-ten albums in 1994 =

The UK Albums Chart is one of many music charts compiled by the Official Charts Company that calculates the best-selling albums of the week in the United Kingdom. Before 2004, the chart was only based on the sales of physical albums. This list shows albums that peaked in the Top 10 of the UK Albums Chart during 1994, as well as albums which peaked in 1993 and 1995 but were in the top 10 in 1994. The entry date is when the album appeared in the top ten for the first time (week ending, as published by the Official Charts Company, which is six days after the chart is announced).

The first new number-one album of the year was Tease Me by Chaka Demus & Pliers. Overall, twenty-seven different albums peaked at number-one in 1994, with twenty-seven unique artists hitting that position.

== Top-ten albums ==
Key

Symbol	Meaning
‡	Album peaked in 1992 or 1993 but still in chart in 1994.
♦	Album released in 1994 but peaked in 1995 or 1996.
Entered	The date that the album first appeared in the chart.
Peak	Highest position that the album reached in the UK Albums Chart.

Entered (week ending)	Weeks in top 10	Single	Artist	Peak	Peak reached (week ending)	Weeks at peak
Albums in 1992
3 October 1992	18	ABBA Gold: Greatest Hits ‡	ABBA	1	3 October 1992	1
Albums in 1993
30 January 1993	30	So Close ‡	Dina Carroll	2	30 January 1993	4
13 March 1993	15	Ten Summoner's Tales ‡	Sting	2	13 March 1993	1
17 July 1993	12	Debut ‡	Björk	3	17 July 1993	3
11 September 1993	37	Music Box ‡	Mariah Carey	1	11 September 1993	6
18 September 1993	23	Bat Out of Hell II: Back into Hell ‡	Meat Loaf	1	18 September 1993	11
16 October 1993	17	Elegant Slumming ‡	M People	2	16 October 1993	1
23 October 1993	15	Everything Changes ‡	Take That	1	23 October 1993	2
30 October 1993	18	One Woman: The Ultimate Collection	Diana Ross	1	1 January 1994	2
20 November 1993	12	Both Sides ‡	Phil Collins	1	20 November 1993	1
20 November 1993	13	So Far So Good	Bryan Adams	1	15 January 1994	1
20 November 1993	22	End of Part One: Their Greatest Hits	Wet Wet Wet	1	30 July 1994	5
27 November 1993	6	The One Thing ‡	Michael Bolton	4	27 November 1993	1
4 December 1993	5	Duets ‡	Elton John and Various artists	5	4 December 1993	2
Albums in 1994
29 January 1994	6	Tease Me	Chaka Demus & Pliers	1	29 January 1994	2
29 January 1994	24	Always & Forever ♦	Eternal	2	7 January 1995	3
5 February 1994	1	Antenna	ZZ Top	3	5 February 1994	1
5 February 1994	1	Jar of Flies/Sap (EP)	Alice in Chains	4	5 February 1994	1
5 February 1994	5	D:Ream On Volume 1	D:Ream	5	5 February 1994	1
5 February 1994	1	Hips and Makers	Kristin Hersh	7	5 February 1994	1
12 February 1994	4	Under the Pink	Tori Amos	1	12 February 1994	1
12 February 1994	2	In Pieces	Garth Brooks	2	12 February 1994	1
19 February 1994	9	The Cross of Changes	Enigma	1	19 February 1994	1
19 February 1994	1	Troublegum	Therapy?	5	19 February 1994	1
19 February 1994	2	Softly with These Songs: The Best of Roberta Flack	Roberta Flack	7	19 February 1994	1
19 February 1994	3	The Heart of Chicago	Chicago	6	19 March 1994	1
19 February 1994	1	Brave	Marillion	10	19 February 1994	1
5 March 1994	32	The Colour of My Love ♦	Celine Dion	1	28 January 1995	7
12 March 1994	16	Everybody Else Is Doing It, So Why Can't We?	The Cranberries	1	25 June 1994	1
12 March 1994	1	Tiger Bay	Saint Etienne	8	12 March 1994	1
19 March 1994	1	Brutal Youth	Elvis Costello	2	19 March 1994	1
19 March 1994	1	Superunknown	Soundgarden	4	19 March 1994	1
19 March 1994	1	Hit the Highway	The Proclaimers	8	19 March 1994	1
19 March 1994	1	The Downward Spiral	Nine Inch Nails	9	19 March 1994	1
19 March 1994	1	Devil Hopping	Inspiral Carpets	10	19 March 1994	1
26 March 1994	2	Vauxhall and I	Morrissey	1	26 March 1994	1
26 March 1994	14	Happy Nation	Ace of Base	1	2 July 1994	2
26 March 1994	1	Forever Now	Level 42	8	26 March 1994	1
26 March 1994	4	Canto Gregoriano	Coro De Monjes Del Monasterio Benedictino De Santo Domingo De Silos	7	2 April 1994	2
26 March 1994	1	U Got 2 Know	Cappella	10	26 March 1994	1
2 April 1994	1	Far Beyond Driven	Pantera	3	2 April 1994	1
2 April 1994	1	Up to Our Hips	The Charlatans	8	2 April 1994	1
9 April 1994	13	The Division Bell	Pink Floyd	1	9 April 1994	4
9 April 1994	3	Give Out But Don't Give Up	Primal Scream	2	9 April 1994	1
9 April 1994	5	The Very Best of Marvin Gaye	Marvin Gaye	3	30 April 1994	1
9 April 1994	2	Miaow	The Beautiful South	6	9 April 1994	1
16 April 1994	14	Our Town – The Greatest Hits	Deacon Blue	1	14 May 1994	2
16 April 1994	5	Brother Sister	The Brand New Heavies	4	16 April 1994	2
23 April 1994	2	Crash! Boom! Bang!	Roxette	3	23 April 1994	1
23 April 1994	1	Haddaway – The Album	Haddaway	9	23 April 1994	1
30 April 1994	2	Toni Braxton	Toni Braxton	4	30 April 1994	1
30 April 1994	1	A Night in San Francisco	Van Morrison	8	30 April 1994	1
30 April 1994	1	His 'n' Hers	Pulp	9	30 April 1994	1
30 April 1994	1	Blues	Jimi Hendrix	10	30 April 1994	1
7 May 1994	36	Parklife	Blur	1	7 May 1994	1
7 May 1994	1	Stacked Up	Senser	4	7 May 1994	1
7 May 1994	2	A Carnival of Hits	Judith Durham and The Seekers	7	7 May 1994	2
14 May 1994	6	God Shuffled His Feet	Crash Test Dummies	2	14 May 1994	2
14 May 1994	3	Goin' Back: The Very Best of Dusty Springfield	Dusty Springfield	5	21 May 1994	1
14 May 1994	1	Skin	Skin	9	14 May 1994	1
21 May 1994	1	Last of the Independents	The Pretenders	8	21 May 1994	1
21 May 1994	1	Experimental Jet Set, Trash and No Star	Sonic Youth	10	21 May 1994	1
28 May 1994	3	I Say I Say I Say	Erasure	1	28 May 1994	1
28 May 1994	1	This Way Up	Chris de Burgh	5	28 May 1994	1
4 June 1994	12	Seal (1994)	Seal	1	4 June 1994	2
4 June 1994	1	Lifeforms	The Future Sound of London	6	4 June 1994	1
4 June 1994	3	Crazy	Julio Iglesias	6	27 August 1994	1
4 June 1994	1	Ill Communication	Beastie Boys	10	4 June 1994	1
11 June 1994	1	The Plot Thickens	Galliano	8	11 June 1994	1
18 June 1994	3	Real Things	2 Unlimited	1	18 June 1994	1
18 June 1994	1	The Last Temptation	Alice Cooper	6	18 June 1994	1
18 June 1994	1	Around the Next Dream	BBM	9	18 June 1994	1
18 June 1994	1	Purple	Stone Temple Pilots	10	18 June 1994	1
25 June 1994	1	Pomme Fritz: The Orb's Little Album	The Orb	6	25 June 1994	1
2 July 1994	2	Eddi Reader	Eddi Reader	4	2 July 1994	1
2 July 1994	1	Carnival of Light	Ride	5	2 July 1994	1
2 July 1994	5	The Very Best of the Electric Light Orchestra	Electric Light Orchestra	4	9 July 1994	1
9 July 1994	2	Turn It Upside Down	Spin Doctors	3	9 July 1994	1
9 July 1994	1	Loudmouth – The Best of Bob Geldof and the Boomtown Rats	Bob Geldof and The Boomtown Rats	10	9 July 1994	1
16 July 1994	11	Music for the Jilted Generation	The Prodigy	1	16 July 1994	1
16 July 1994	6	Greatest Hits	Whitesnake	4	16 July 1994	1
16 July 1994	2	Feeling Good: The Very Best of Nina Simone	Nina Simone	9	16 July 1994	2
23 July 1994	5	Voodoo Lounge	The Rolling Stones	1	23 July 1994	1
23 July 1994	5	The Very Best of the Eagles	Eagles	4	30 July 1994	1
30 July 1994	1	Same as It Ever Was	House of Pain	8	30 July 1994	1
6 August 1994	4	The Glory of Gershwin	Larry Adler and Various artists	2	6 August 1994	3
13 August 1994	1	Swagger	Gun	5	13 August 1994	1
13 August 1994	1	One Careful Owner	Michael Ball	7	13 August 1994	1
20 August 1994	1	Snivilisation	Orbital	4	20 August 1994	1
27 August 1994	2	Come	Prince	1	27 August 1994	1
27 August 1994	2	Sleeps with Angels	Neil Young & Crazy Horse	2	27 August 1994	1
3 September 1994	11	Twelve Deadly Cyns...and Then Some	Cyndi Lauper	2	3 September 1994	3
3 September 1994	1	Everyone's Got One	Echobelly	8	3 September 1994	1
10 September 1994	25	Definitely Maybe	Oasis	1	10 September 1994	1
10 September 1994	8	The Three Tenors in Concert 1994	José Carreras, Plácido Domingo and Luciano Pavarotti	1	17 September 1994	1
10 September 1994	1	The Holy Bible	Manic Street Preachers	6	10 September 1994	1
10 September 1994	4	The Essential Collection	Elvis Presley	6	17 September 1994	1
10 September 1994	1	Secret World Live	Peter Gabriel	10	10 September 1994	1
17 September 1994	1	File Under: Easy Listening	Sugar	7	17 September 1994	1
17 September 1994	1	Have a Little Faith	Joe Cocker	9	17 September 1994	1
24 September 1994	4	From the Cradle	Eric Clapton	1	24 September 1994	1
24 September 1994	1	Disco 2	Pet Shop Boys	6	24 September 1994	1
24 September 1994	1	Simply the Best	Tina Turner	9	24 September 1994	1
1 October 1994	3	Songs	Luther Vandross	1	1 October 1994	1
1 October 1994	1	Kylie Minogue	Kylie Minogue	4	1 October 1994	1
8 October 1994	9	Monster	R.E.M.	1	8 October 1994	2
8 October 1994	3	Protection/No Protection	Massive Attack	4	8 October 1994	1
8 October 1994	1	If The Beatles Had Read Hunter...The Singles	The Wonder Stuff	8	8 October 1994	1
8 October 1994	1	The Commitments (Original Motion Picture Soundtrack)	The Commitments	9	8 October 1994	1
15 October 1994	22	No Need to Argue	The Cranberries	2	15 October 1994	1
15 October 1994	8	The Hit List – The Best of 35 Years	Cliff Richard	3	15 October 1994	1
22 October 1994	15	Cross Road	Bon Jovi	1	22 October 1994	5
22 October 1994	1	Dog Man Star	Suede	3	22 October 1994	1
22 October 1994	1	Move It!	Reel 2 Real featuring The Mad Stuntman	8	22 October 1994	1
29 October 1994	2	The Return of the Space Cowboy	Jamiroquai	2	29 October 1994	1
29 October 1994	9	Steam	East 17	3	31 December 1994	3
29 October 1994	2	Hold Me, Thrill Me, Kiss Me	Gloria Estefan	5	29 October 1994	1
5 November 1994	3	Bedtime Stories	Madonna	2	5 November 1994	1
5 November 1994	3	The Best of Chris Rea	Chris Rea	3	5 November 1994	1
5 November 1994	1	Youthanasia	Megadeth	6	5 November 1994	1
12 November 1994	3	MTV Unplugged in New York	Nirvana	1	12 November 1994	1
12 November 1994	3	The Greatest Hits	INXS	3	12 November 1994	1
12 November 1994	4	The Best of Sade	Sade	6	12 November 1994	1
12 November 1994	2	Big Ones	Aerosmith	7	12 November 1994	1
12 November 1994	1	Amorica	The Black Crowes	8	12 November 1994	1
19 November 1994	9	Fields of Gold: The Best of Sting 1984–1994	Sting	2	19 November 1994	1
19 November 1994	18	Carry on up the Charts: The Best of The Beautiful South	The Beautiful South	1	3 December 1994	7
19 November 1994	3	Labour of Love, Volumes I and II	UB40	5	26 November 1994	1
19 November 1994	1	No Quarter: Jimmy Page and Robert Plant Unledded	Jimmy Page & Robert Plant	7	19 November 1994	1
26 November 1994	26	Bizarre Fruit ♦	M People	3	17 February 1996	3
3 December 1994	4	The Best of New Order	New Order	4	3 December 1994	1
10 December 1994	5	Live at the BBC	The Beatles	1	10 December 1994	1
10 December 1994	1	Vitalogy	Pearl Jam	4	10 December 1994	1
17 December 1994	14	Crocodile Shoes (Original Songs from the BBC Television Serial)	Jimmy Nail	2	24 December 1994	2
17 December 1994	1	Second Coming	The Stone Roses	4	17 December 1994	1
24 December 1994	2	The Pure Genius of Louis Armstrong: We Have All the Time in the World	Louis Armstrong	10	24 December 1994	2

== See also ==
- 1994 in British music
- List of number-one albums from the 1990s (UK)
