= To See the Lights =

Compilation album by Gene
- Released: 26 January 1996
- Genre: Indie rock, Britpop
- Length: 78:48
- Label: Costermonger
- Producer: Sam Cunningham, Phil Vinall, Miti Adhikari, Paul Allen

Gene chronology
Olympian (1995)	To See the Lights (1996)	Drawn to the Deep End (1997)

Professional ratings
Review scores
Source	Rating
AllMusic	4.5/5 stars

To See the Lights is a compilation album by the English indie rock band Gene, featuring B-sides, covers and live versions of their songs. It was released on 26 January 1996.

The album was reissued in double disc deluxe editions containing extra materials on 3 February 2014.

== Track listing ==
All music is composed by Matt James, Steve Mason, Kevin Miles and Martin Rossiter, except when noted.

No.	Title	Length
1.	"Be My Light, Be My Guide"	4:04
2.	"Sick, Sober & Sorry"	2:52
3.	"Her Fifteen Years"	2:53
4.	"Haunted By You"	3:53
5.	"I Can't Decide If She Really Loves Me"	4:22
6.	"To See The Lights"	2:29
7.	"I Can't Help Myself"	3:14
8.	"A Car That Sped"	2:13
9.	"For The Dead"	3:28
10.	"Sleep Well Tonight"	4:13
11.	"How Much For Love"	3:39
12.	"London, Can You Wait?"	2:43
13.	"I Can't Help Myself" (Acoustic)	2:06
14.	"Child's Body"	4:04
15.	"Don't Let Me Down" (John Lennon/Paul McCartney)	3:10
16.	"I Say a Little Prayer" (Burt Bacharach/Hal David)	3:13
17.	"Do You Want To Hear It From Me"	2:41
18.	"This Is Not My Crime"	2:36
19.	"Olympian"	5:35
20.	"Child's Body" (For The Dead (Original Version) begins at 12:00)	15:20
Total length:		78:48

== Personnel ==
Gene

- Matt James
- Steve Mason
- Kevin Miles
- Martin Rossiter
