= List of UK top-ten albums in 1996 =

The UK Albums Chart is one of many music charts compiled by the Official Charts Company that calculates the best-selling albums of the week in the United Kingdom. Before 2004, the chart was only based on the sales of physical albums. This list shows albums that peaked in the Top 10 of the UK Albums Chart during 1996, as well as albums which peaked in 1995 and 1997 but were in the top 10 in 1996. The entry date is when the album appeared in the top ten for the first time (week ending, as published by the Official Charts Company, which is six days after the chart is announced).

Ninety-seven albums were in the top ten this year. Three albums from 1994 and fifteen from 1995 remained in the top 10 for several weeks at the beginning of the year, while Evita: The Complete Motion Picture Music Soundtrack by Madonna and Various artists and Ocean Drive by Lighthouse Family were both released in 1996 but did not reach their peak until 1997. Bizarre Fruit by M People first charted in 1994 but took until 1996 to hit its highest position. The Bends by Radiohead was the only album from 1995 to reach its peak in 1996. Eight artists scored multiple entries in the top 10 in 1996. are among the many artists who achieved their first UK charting top 10 album in 1996.

The first new number-one album of the year was Expecting to Fly by The Bluetones. Overall, nineteen different albums peaked at number-one in 1996, with nineteen unique artists hitting that position.

== Background ==
=== Multiple entries ===
Ninety-seven albums charted in the top 10 in 1996, with seventy-nine albums reaching their peak this year.

Eight artists scored multiple entries in the top 10 in 1996. The Beatles, Boyzone, Celine Dion, Madonna, Oasis, Robson & Jerome, Simply Red, The Smurfs were the acts to chart with two albums this year.

=== Chart debuts ===
artists achieved their first top 10 album in 1996 as a lead artist. had one other entry in their breakthrough year.

The following table (collapsed on desktop site) does not include acts who had previously charted as part of a group and secured their first top 10 solo album, or featured appearances on compilations or other artists recordings.

Artist	Number of top 10s	First entry	Chart position	Other entries

=== Soundtracks ===
Soundtrack albums for various films entered the top 10 throughout the year. These included.

=== Best-selling albums ===
Alanis Morissette had the best-selling album of the year with Jagged Little Pill. The album spent 41 weeks in the top 10 (including 11 weeks at number one), sold around 2 million copies and was certified 7× platinum by the BPI.Spice by the Spice Girls came in second place. Oasis' (What's the Story) Morning Glory?, Falling into You from Celine Dion and Older by George Michael made up the top five. Albums by Robson & Jerome, The Fugees, Simply Red, The Beautiful South and Take That were also in the top-ten best selling albums of the year.

== Top-ten albums ==
Key

Symbol	Meaning
‡	Album peaked in 1994 or 1995 but still in chart in 1996.
♦	Album released in 1996 but peaked in 1997.
(#)	Year-end top-ten album position and rank
Entered	The date that the album first appeared in the chart.
Peak	Highest position that the album reached in the UK Albums Chart.

Entered (week ending)	Weeks in top 10	Single	Artist	Peak	Peak reached (week ending)	Weeks at peak
Albums in 1994
5 March 1994	32	The Colour of My Love ‡	Celine Dion	1	28 January 1995	7
10 September 1994	25	Definitely Maybe ‡	Oasis	1	10 September 1994	1
26 November 1994	26	Bizarre Fruit	M People	3	17 February 1996	3
Albums in 1995
25 March 1995	5	The Bends	Radiohead	4	10 February 1996	1
27 May 1995	24	Stanley Road ‡	Paul Weller	1	27 May 1995	1
24 June 1995	22	HIStory: Past, Present and Future, Book I ‡	Michael Jackson	1	24 June 1995	1
2 September 1995	10	Said and Done ‡	Boyzone	1	2 September 1995	1
14 October 1995	51	(What's the Story) Morning Glory? ‡	Oasis	1	14 October 1995	10
21 October 1995	15	Life ‡	Simply Red	1	21 October 1995	3
28 October 1995	3	All Change ‡	Cast	7	28 October 1995	1
11 November 1995	23	Different Class ‡	Pulp	1	11 November 1995	1
11 November 1995	5	Welcome to the Neighbourhood ‡	Meat Loaf	3	11 November 1995	1
11 November 1995	4	Power of a Woman ‡	Eternal	6	11 November 1995	1
18 November 1995	10	Made in Heaven ‡	Queen	1	18 November 1995	1
18 November 1995	12	Something to Remember ‡	Madonna	3	18 November 1995	1
18 November 1995	8	Love Songs ‡	Elton John	4	16 December 1995	1
25 November 1995	13	Robson & Jerome ‡	Robson & Jerome	1	25 November 1995	7
2 December 1995	8	The Memory of Trees ‡	Enya	5	9 December 1995	1
Albums in 1996
20 January 1996	41	Jagged Little Pill	Alanis Morissette	1	4 May 1996	11
27 January 1996	2	First Love	Michael Ball	4	27 January 1996	1
3 February 1996	2	Boys for Pele	Tori Amos	2	3 February 1996	1
10 February 1996	1	Deliverance	Baby D	5	10 February 1996	1
10 February 1996	1	It's a Man's World	Cher	10	10 February 1996	1
17 February 1996	3	Don't Stop	Status Quo	2	17 February 1996	1
17 February 1996	1	The Boy with the X-Ray Eyes	Babylon Zoo	6	17 February 1996	1
17 February 1996	1	Murder Ballads	Nick Cave and the Bad Seeds	8	17 February 1996	1
17 February 1996	1	This World and Body	Marion	10	17 February 1996	1
24 February 1996	3	Expecting to Fly	The Bluetones	1	24 February 1996	1
24 February 1996	1	Same Oul' Town	The Saw Doctors	6	24 February 1996	1
9 March 1996	1	Roots	Sepultura	4	9 March 1996	1
9 March 1996	1	Relish	Joan Osborne	5	9 March 1996	1
16 March 1996	12	Hits	Mike and the Mechanics	3	16 March 1996	2
16 March 1996	3	Mercury Falling	Sting	4	16 March 1996	1
16 March 1996	29	Ocean Drive ♦	Lighthouse Family	3	8 March 1997	1
23 March 1996	41	Falling into You	Celine Dion	1	23 March 1996	1
23 March 1996	1	Regular Urban Survivors	Terrorvision	8	23 March 1996	1
23 March 1996	1	Second Toughest in the Infants	Underworld	9	23 March 1996	1
23 March 1996	1	Countdown 1992–1983	Pulp	10	23 March 1996	1
30 March 1996	2	Anthology 2	The Beatles	1	30 March 1996	1
30 March 1996	7	Garbage	Garbage	6	27 April 1996	2
30 March 1996	1	Lovelife	Lush	8	30 March 1996	1
6 April 1996	10	Greatest Hits	Take That	1	6 April 1996	4
6 April 1996	1	Golden Heart	Mark Knopfler	9	6 April 1996	1
13 April 1996	4	Wildest Dreams	Tina Turner	4	13 April 1996	1
13 April 1996	1	A Maximum High	Shed Seven	8	13 April 1996	1
20 April 1996	22	Moseley Shoals	Ocean Colour Scene	2	20 April 1996	6
27 April 1996	1	Evil Empire	Rage Against the Machine	4	27 April 1996	1
4 May 1996	2	Return of the Mack	Mark Morrison	4	4 May 1996	1
4 May 1996	1	Fairweather Johnson	Hootie & the Blowfish	9	4 May 1996	1
4 May 1996	1	Nearly God	Tricky	10	4 May 1996	1
11 May 1996	4	To the Faithful Departed	The Cranberries	2	11 May 1996	1
11 May 1996	1	In Sides	Orbital	5	11 May 1996	1
18 May 1996	9	1977	Ash	1	18 May 1996	1
18 May 1996	2	Walking Wounded	Everything but the Girl	4	18 May 1996	1
18 May 1996	2	The It Girl	Sleeper	5	18 May 1996	1
18 May 1996	1	Wild Mood Swings	The Cure	9	18 May 1996	1
25 May 1996	35	Older	George Michael	1	25 May 1996	3
25 May 1996	1	Slang	Def Leppard	5	25 May 1996	1
1 June 1996	16	Everything Must Go	Manic Street Preachers	2	1 June 1996	2
1 June 1996	31	The Score	The Fugees	2	5 October 1996	1
1 June 1996	1	Down on the Upside	Soundgarden	7	1 June 1996	1
15 June 1996	2	Load	Metallica	1	15 June 1996	1
22 June 1996	3	18 til I Die	Bryan Adams	1	22 June 1996	1
22 June 1996	3	Dreamland	Robert Miles	7	22 June 1996	1
29 June 1996	6	Free Peace Sweet	Dodgy	7	29 June 1996	1
6 July 1996	18	Recurring Dream: The Very Best of Crowded House	Crowded House	1	6 July 1996	2
6 July 1996	1	Naked	Louise	7	6 July 1996	1
6 July 1996	12	The Smurfs Go Pop!	The Smurfs	2	17 August 1996	1
20 July 1996	1	Raise the Pressure	Electronic	8	20 July 1996	1
31 August 1996	3	The Ultimate Collection	Neil Diamond	5	31 August 1996	1
7 September 1996	1	No Code	Pearl Jam	3	7 September 1996	1
14 September 1996	4	Coming Up	Suede	1	14 September 1996	1
14 September 1996	1	Bilingual	Pet Shop Boys	4	14 September 1996	1
21 September 1996	3	New Adventures in Hi-Fi	R.E.M.	1	21 September 1996	1
21 September 1996	17	Travelling Without Moving	Jamiroquai	2	21 September 1996	2
28 September 1996	10	K	Kula Shaker	1	28 September 1996	2
28 September 1996	4	Spiders	Space	5	28 September 1996	1
12 October 1996	2	Natural	Peter Andre	1	12 October 1996	1
12 October 1996	1	From the Muddy Banks of the Wishkah	Nirvana	4	12 October 1996	1
12 October 1996	6	Sheryl Crow	Sheryl Crow	5	12 October 1996	3
19 October 1996	16	Greatest Hits	Simply Red	1	19 October 1996	2
19 October 1996	3	Stoosh	Skunk Anansie	9	19 October 1996	2
26 October 1996	2	Only Human	Dina Carroll	2	26 October 1996	1
26 October 1996	1	Recovering the Satellites	Counting Crows	4	26 October 1996	1
2 November 1996	22	Blue Is the Colour	The Beautiful South	1	2 November 1996	1
2 November 1996	2	Dance into the Light	Phil Collins	4	2 November 1996	1
2 November 1996	1	Ugly Beautiful	Babybird	9	2 November 1996	1
9 November 1996	9	A Different Beat	Boyzone	1	9 November 1996	1
9 November 1996	1	Anthology 3	The Beatles	4	9 November 1996	1
9 November 1996	10	Evita: The Complete Motion Picture Music Soundtrack ♦	Madonna and Various artists	1	1 February 1997	1
16 November 1996	43	Spice	Spice Girls	1	16 November 1996	15
16 November 1996	6	Around the World Hit Singles: The Journey So Far	East 17	3	16 November 1996	2
16 November 1996	3	If We Fall in Love Tonight	Rod Stewart	8	16 November 1996	1
23 November 1996	7	Take Two	Robson & Jerome	1	23 November 1996	2
23 November 1996	5	Christmas Party	The Smurfs	8	23 November 1996	3
23 November 1996	1	The Finest	Fine Young Cannibals	10	23 November 1996	1
28 December 1996	1	Crocodile Shoes II (Original Songs from the BBC Television Serial)	Jimmy Nail	10	28 December 1996	1

== Entries by artist ==
The following table shows artists who have achieved two or more top 10 entries in 1996, including albums that reached their peak in 1995 or 1997. The figures only include main artists, with featured artists and appearances on compilation albums not counted individually for each artist. The total number of weeks an artist spent in the top ten in 1996 is also shown.

Entries	Artist	Weeks	Albums

== See also ==
- 1996 in British music
- List of number-one albums from the 1990s (UK)
