= List of UK top-ten albums in 1998 =

The UK Albums Chart is one of many music charts compiled by the Official Charts Company that calculates the best-selling albums of the week in the United Kingdom. Before 2004, the chart was only based on the sales of physical albums. This list shows albums that peaked in the Top 10 of the UK Albums Chart during 1998, as well as albums which peaked in 1997 and 1999 but were in the top 10 in 1998. The entry date is when the album appeared in the top ten for the first time (week ending, as published by the Official Charts Company, which is six days after the chart is announced).

The first new number-one album of the year was Titanic: Music from the Motion Picture by James Horner. Overall, twenty-one different albums peaked at number-one in 1998, with Robbie Williams (2) having the most albums hit that position.

== Background ==
=== Best-selling albums ===
The Corrs had the best-selling album of the year with Talk on Corners. Ladies & Gentlemen: The Best of George Michael by George Michael came in second place. Where We Belong by Boyzone, Life Thru a Lens by Robbie Williams and I've Been Expecting You by Robbie Williams made up the top five. Albums by The Verve, Madonna, Celine Dion, All Saints and James Horner were also in the top-ten best selling albums of the year.

== Top-ten albums ==
Key

Symbol	Meaning
‡	Album peaked in 1997 but still in chart in 1998.
♦	Album released in 1998 but peaked in 1999.
(#)	Year-end top-ten album position and rank
Entered	The date that the album first appeared in the chart.
Peak	Highest position that the album reached in the UK Albums Chart.

Entered (week ending)	Weeks in top 10	Single	Artist	Peak	Peak reached (week ending)	Weeks at peak
Albums in 1997
15 February 1997	42	White on Blonde ‡	Texas	1	15 February 1997	2
28 June 1997	19	OK Computer ‡	Radiohead	1	28 June 1997	2
4 October 1997	8	Maverick A Strike ‡	Finley Quaye	3	4 October 1997	1
11 October 1997	42	Urban Hymns ‡	The Verve	1	11 October 1997	12
25 October 1997	7	Fresco ‡	M People	2	25 October 1997	1
1 November 1997	25	Postcards from Heaven ‡	Lighthouse Family	2	1 November 1997	2
1 November 1997	12	Greatest Hits ‡	Eternal	2	8 November 1997	1
1 November 1997	56	Talk on Corners	The Corrs	1	27 June 1998	10
8 November 1997	6	Lennon Legend: The Very Best of John Lennon ‡	John Lennon	4	8 November 1997	1
15 November 1997	11	Spiceworld ‡	Spice Girls	1	15 November 1997	3
15 November 1997	7	Paint the Sky with Stars: The Best of Enya ‡	Enya	4	15 November 1997	2
22 November 1997	8	Like You Do... Best of The Lightning Seeds ‡	The Lightning Seeds	5	22 November 1997	1
29 November 1997	29	Let's Talk About Love ‡	Celine Dion	1	29 November 1997	5
6 December 1997	7	The Best of Wham!: If You Were There... ‡	Wham!	4	6 December 1997	5
6 December 1997	15	Left of the Middle ‡	Natalie Imbruglia	5	6 December 1997	1
13 December 1997	23	All Saints	All Saints	2	17 January 1998	3
Albums in 1998
17 January 1998	44	Life Thru a Lens	Robbie Williams	1	18 April 1998	2
31 January 1998	1	Moon Safari	Air	6	31 January 1998	1
31 January 1998	7	Truly: The Love Songs	Lionel Richie	5	21 February 1998	2
31 January 1998	1	The Blue Cafe	Chris Rea	10	31 January 1998	1
7 February 1998	15	Titanic: Music from the Motion Picture	James Horner	1	14 February 1998	3
7 February 1998	1	Decksandrumsandrockandroll	Propellerheads	6	7 February 1998	1
14 February 1998	1	Unfinished Monkey Business	Ian Brown	4	14 February 1998	1
14 February 1998	1	Yield	Pearl Jam	7	14 February 1998	1
14 February 1998	5	Aquarium	Aqua	6	28 February 1998	1
7 March 1998	2	Melting Pot	The Charlatans	4	7 March 1998	1
14 March 1998	20	Ray of Light	Madonna	1	14 March 1998	2
21 March 1998	2	Tin Planet	Space	3	21 March 1998	1
21 March 1998	2	Pilgrim	Eric Clapton	6	21 March 1998	1
21 March 1998	1	Return to the Last Chance Saloon	The Bluetones	10	21 March 1998	1
4 April 1998	9	The Best Of	James	1	4 April 1998	1
4 April 1998	2	In My Life	George Martin	5	25 April 1998	1
4 April 1998	1	Kylie Minogue (1998)	Kylie Minogue	10	4 April 1998	1
11 April 1998	2	This is Hardcore	Pulp	1	11 April 1998	1
25 April 1998	3	Essentials – The Very Best of George Benson	George Benson	8	25 April 1998	2
2 May 1998	5	Mezzanine	Massive Attack	1	2 May 1998	2
2 May 1998	1	Walking into Clarksdale	Jimmy Page & Robert Plant	3	2 May 1998	1
2 May 1998	18	International Velvet	Catatonia	1	16 May 1998	1
16 May 1998	1	From the Choirgirl Hotel	Tori Amos	6	16 May 1998	1
23 May 1998	7	Version 2.0	Garbage	1	23 May 1998	1
23 May 1998	1	Sketches for My Sweetheart the Drunk	Jeff Buckley	7	23 May 1998	1
30 May 1998	18	Blue	Simply Red	1	30 May 1998	2
30 May 1998	2	My Way: The Best of Frank Sinatra	Frank Sinatra	7	30 May 1998	1
6 June 1998	27	Where We Belong	Boyzone	1	6 June 1998	3
13 June 1998	4	When We Were the New Boys	Rod Stewart	2	13 June 1998	1
13 June 1998	1	Adore	The Smashing Pumpkins	5	13 June 1998	1
13 June 1998	1	Let It Ride	Shed Seven	9	13 June 1998	1
20 June 1998	6	The Good Will Out	Embrace	1	20 June 1998	1
27 June 1998	1	Try Whistling This	Neil Finn	5	27 June 1998	1
27 June 1998	1	Trampoline	The Mavericks	10	27 June 1998	1
4 July 1998	4	Five	Five	1	4 July 1998	1
18 July 1998	4	Hello Nasty	Beastie Boys	1	18 July 1998	1
18 July 1998	1	Moving On	911	10	18 July 1998	1
25 July 1998	6	Jane McDonald	Jane McDonald	1	25 July 1998	3
1 August 1998	5	Desireless	Eagle-Eye Cherry	3	1 August 1998	1
29 August 1998	9	Savage Garden	Savage Garden	2	19 September 1998	1
29 August 1998	1	Follow the Leader	Korn	5	29 August 1998	1
5 September 1998	2	100% Colombian	Fun Lovin' Criminals	3	5 September 1998	1
5 September 1998	1	Psyence Fiction	Unkle	4	5 September 1998	1
5 September 1998	1	Life Goes On	Sash!	5	5 September 1998	1
12 September 1998	2	Tubular Bells III	Mike Oldfield	4	12 September 1998	1
12 September 1998	1	Fin de Siècle	The Divine Comedy	9	12 September 1998	1
12 September 1998	1	Back to Titanic	James Horner	10	12 September 1998	1
19 September 1998	10	One Night Only	Bee Gees	4	19 September 1998	1
19 September 1998	1	Hatful of Rain (The Best of Del Amitri)	Del Amitri	5	19 September 1998	1
19 September 1998	1	Six	Mansun	6	19 September 1998	1
26 September 1998	10	This Is My Truth Tell Me Yours	Manic Street Preachers	1	26 September 1998	3
26 September 1998	25	Step One	Steps	2	26 September 1998	1
26 September 1998	1	Mechanical Animals	Marilyn Manson	8	26 September 1998	1
3 October 1998	2	The Globe Sessions	Sheryl Crow	2	3 October 1998	1
3 October 1998	7	The Best of Ladysmith Black Mambazo – The Star and the Wiseman	Ladysmith Black Mambazo	2	17 October 1998	1
3 October 1998	1	Sunday 8PM	Faithless	10	3 October 1998	1
10 October 1998	10	The Miseducation of Lauryn Hill	Lauryn Hill	2	10 October 1998	3
10 October 1998	1	The Singles 86>98	Depeche Mode	5	10 October 1998	1
17 October 1998	9	Hits	Phil Collins	1	17 October 1998	1
17 October 1998	4	Songs from Ally McBeal	Vonda Shepard	3	17 October 1998	1
17 October 1998	1	Nu-Clear Sounds	Ash	7	17 October 1998	1
24 October 1998	7	Quench	The Beautiful South	1	24 October 1998	2
24 October 1998	6	B*Witched	B*Witched	3	24 October 1998	1
24 October 1998	1	Without You I'm Nothing	Placebo	7	24 October 1998	1
24 October 1998	1	Labour of Love III	UB40	8	24 October 1998	1
31 October 1998	22	You've Come a Long Way, Baby ♦	Fatboy Slim	1	23 January 1999	4
31 October 1998	2	Sultans of Swing: The Very Best of Dire Straits	Dire Straits	6	31 October 1998	1
31 October 1998	1	Love Songs	Daniel O'Donnell	9	31 October 1998	1
31 October 1998	1	Real as I Wanna Be	Cliff Richard	10	31 October 1998	1
7 November 1998	31	I've Been Expecting You	Robbie Williams	1	7 November 1998	3
7 November 1998	1	Up	R.E.M.	2	7 November 1998	1
7 November 1998	2	Believe ♦	Cher	7	20 March 1999	1
14 November 1998	2	The Best of 1980–1990 & B-Sides	U2	1	14 November 1998	1
14 November 1998	2	The Masterplan	Oasis	2	14 November 1998	1
14 November 1998	2	Supposed Former Infatuation Junkie	Alanis Morissette	3	14 November 1998	1
14 November 1998	11	The Best of M People	M People	2	12 December 1998	1
21 November 1998	16	Ladies & Gentlemen: The Best of George Michael	George Michael	1	21 November 1998	8
21 November 1998	1	Modern Classics: The Greatest Hits	Paul Weller	7	21 November 1998	1
21 November 1998	11	The Best of 1980-1990 (Single-Disc Version)	U2	4	5 December 1998	1
28 November 1998	4	Voice of an Angel	Charlotte Church	4	28 November 1998	1
28 November 1998	1	#1's	Mariah Carey	10	28 November 1998	1

== See also ==
- 1998 in British music
- List of number-one albums from the 1990s (UK)
