= List of UK top-ten albums in 1993 =

The UK Albums Chart is one of many music charts compiled by the Official Charts Company that calculates the best-selling albums of the week in the United Kingdom. Before 2004, the chart was only based on the sales of physical albums. This list shows albums that peaked in the Top 10 of the UK Albums Chart during 1993, as well as albums which peaked in 1992 and 1994 but were in the top 10 in 1993. The entry date is when the album appeared in the top ten for the first time (week ending, as published by the Official Charts Company, which is six days after the chart is announced).

The first new number-one album of the year was Live – The Way We Walk, Volume Two: The Longs by Genesis. Overall, twenty-four different albums peaked at number-one in 1993, with twenty-four unique artists hitting that position.

== Top-ten albums ==
Key

Symbol	Meaning
‡	Album peaked in 1991 or 1992 but still in chart in 1993.
♦	Album released in 1993 but peaked in 1994.
Entered	The date that the album first appeared in the chart.
Peak	Highest position that the album reached in the UK Albums Chart.

Entered (week ending)	Weeks in top 10	Single	Artist	Peak	Peak reached (week ending)	Weeks at peak
Albums in 1991
12 October 1991	51	Stars ‡	Simply Red	1	12 October 1991	12
30 November 1991	24	Dangerous ‡	Michael Jackson	1	30 November 1991	1
Albums in 1992
18 April 1992	24	Diva ‡	Annie Lennox	1	18 April 1992	2
5 September 1992	13	Take That and Party	Take That	2	16 January 1993	1
12 September 1992	13	Unplugged	Eric Clapton	2	20 March 1993	1
26 September 1992	9	Boss Drum ‡	The Shamen	3	26 September 1992	2
3 October 1992	18	ABBA Gold: Greatest Hits ‡	ABBA	1	3 October 1992	1
10 October 1992	46	Automatic for the People ‡	R.E.M.	1	10 October 1992	4
10 October 1992	3	Us ‡	Peter Gabriel	2	10 October 1992	1
10 October 1992	13	Timeless: The Classics ‡	Michael Bolton	3	31 October 1992	6
24 October 1992	13	Glittering Prize 81/92 ‡	Simple Minds	1	24 October 1992	3
14 November 1992	6	Keep the Faith ‡	Bon Jovi	1	14 November 1992	1
14 November 1992	11	Greatest Hits ‡	Gloria Estefan	2	26 December 1992	2
21 November 1992	6	Greatest Hits: 1965–1992 ‡	Cher	1	21 November 1992	1
28 November 1992	8	Pop! The First 20 Hits ‡	Erasure	1	28 November 1992	2
28 November 1992	10	Live – The Way We Walk, Volume One: The Shorts ‡	Genesis	3	28 November 1992	3
28 November 1992	6	The Freddie Mercury Album ‡	Freddie Mercury	4	28 November 1992	1
Albums in 1993
16 January 1993	10	3 Years, 5 Months and 2 Days in the Life Of...	Arrested Development	3	13 February 1993	1
23 January 1993	3	Live – The Way We Walk, Volume Two: The Longs	Genesis	1	23 January 1993	2
23 January 1993	9	Connected	Stereo MCs	2	23 January 1993	1
23 January 1993	1	Into the Skyline	Cathy Dennis	8	23 January 1993	1
30 January 1993	30	So Close	Dina Carroll	2	30 January 1993	4
6 February 1993	1	Jam	Little Angels	1	6 February 1993	1
6 February 1993	1	Dusk	The The	2	6 February 1993	1
6 February 1993	1	Perverse	Jesus Jones	6	6 February 1993	1
6 February 1993	3	Górecki's Symphony No. 3	David Zinman	6	6 February 1993	2
13 February 1993	3	Pure Cult: for Rockers, Ravers, Lovers, and Sinners	The Cult	1	13 February 1993	1
13 February 1993	1	Star	Belly	2	13 February 1993	1
13 February 1993	3	Funky Divas	En Vogue	4	13 February 1993	1
13 February 1993	1	Off the Ground	Paul McCartney	5	13 February 1993	1
13 February 1993	1	The Madman's Return	Snap!	8	13 February 1993	1
20 February 1993	3	Words of Love	Buddy Holly and The Crickets	1	20 February 1993	1
20 February 1993	1	Conscience	The Beloved	2	20 February 1993	1
20 February 1993	1	Where You Been	Dinosaur Jr.	10	20 February 1993	1
27 February 1993	3	Walthamstow	East 17	1	27 February 1993	1
27 February 1993	4	Duran Duran (The Wedding Album)	Duran Duran	4	27 February 1993	1
6 February 1993	2	Lead Vocalist	Rod Stewart	3	6 February 1993	1
6 February 1993	1	So Tough	Saint Etienne	7	6 February 1993	1
6 February 1993	1	If I Was: The Very Best of Midge Ure & Ultravox	Midge Ure and Ultravox	10	6 February 1993	1
13 March 1993	5	Are You Gonna Go My Way	Lenny Kravitz	1	13 March 1993	2
13 March 1993	15	Ten Summoner's Tales	Sting	2	13 March 1993	1
13 March 1993	1	Whatever You Say, Say Nothing	Deacon Blue	4	13 March 1993	1
13 March 1993	4	Ingénue	k.d. lang	3	20 March 1993	1
20 March 1993	1	The Dark Side of the Moon: Twentieth Anniversary Edition	Pink Floyd	4	20 March 1993	1
20 March 1993	1	Songs from the Rain	Hothouse Flowers	7	20 March 1993	1
20 March 1993	1	Frank Black	Frank Black	9	20 March 1993	1
27 March 1993	3	Their Greatest Hits	Hot Chocolate	1	27 March 1993	1
27 March 1993	1	Amazing Things	Runrig	2	27 March 1993	1
27 March 1993	1	Coverdale•Page	Coverdale•Page	4	27 March 1993	1
27 March 1993	3	The Very Best of Randy Crawford	Randy Crawford	8	27 March 1993	1
3 April 1993	2	Songs of Faith and Devotion	Depeche Mode	1	3 April 1993	1
3 April 1993	1	Taxi	Bryan Ferry	2	3 April 1993	1
3 April 1993	1	A Real Live One	Iron Maiden	3	3 April 1993	1
3 April 1993	1	The Bliss Album…? (Vibrations of Love and Anger and the Ponderance of Life and Existence)	P.M. Dawn	9	3 April 1993	1
10 April 1993	4	Suede	Suede	1	10 April 1993	1
10 April 1993	5	Cover Shot	David Essex	3	24 April 1993	1
17 April 1993	3	Black Tie White Noise	David Bowie	1	17 April 1993	1
17 April 1993	1	Beaster (EP)	Sugar	3	17 April 1993	1
17 April 1993	1	Powertrippin'	The Almighty	5	17 April 1993	1
24 April 1993	1	In Concert/MTV Plugged	Bruce Springsteen	4	24 April 1993	1
24 April 1993	1	WrestleMania: The Album	WWF Superstars	10	24 April 1993	1
1 May 1993	3	The Album	Cliff Richard	1	1 May 1993	1
1 May 1993	2	Get a Grip	Aerosmith	2	1 May 1993	1
8 May 1993	2	Bang!	World Party	2	8 May 1993	1
8 May 1993	1	Rid of Me	PJ Harvey	3	8 May 1993	1
8 May 1993	1	The Infotainment Scan	The Fall	9	8 May 1993	1
15 May 1993	3	Republic	New Order	1	15 May 1993	1
15 May 1993	1	Symphony or Damn	Terence Trent D'Arby	4	15 May 1993	1
15 May 1993	2	Banba	Clannad	5	15 May 1993	1
15 May 1993	4	Breathless	Kenny G	4	29 May 1993	1
22 May 1993	8	No Limits!	2 Unlimited	1	12 June 1993	1
22 May 1993	2	On the Night	Dire Straits	4	22 May 1993	1
22 May 1993	2	Home Movies – The Best of Everything but the Girl	Everything but the Girl	5	22 May 1993	1
22 May 1993	1	Blues Alive	Gary Moore	8	22 May 1993	1
29 May 1993	5	Janet	Janet Jackson	1	29 May 1993	2
29 May 1993	1	Wet Wet Wet: Live at the Royal Albert Hall	Wet Wet Wet	10	29 May 1993	1
5 June 1993	2	Kamakiriad	Donald Fagen	3	5 June 1993	1
5 June 1993	2	Dream Harder	The Waterboys	5	5 June 1993	1
5 June 1993	1	Fate of Nations	Robert Plant	6	5 June 1993	1
5 June 1993	13	Unplugged...and Seated	Rod Stewart	2	3 July 1993	2
5 June 1993	17	Pocket Full of Kryptonite	Spin Doctors	2	28 August 1993	1
5 June 1993	1	Utah Saints	Utah Saints	10	5 June 1993	1
12 June 1993	2	Too Long in Exile	Van Morrison	4	12 June 1993	1
19 June 1993	6	What's Love Got to Do with It	Tina Turner	1	19 June 1993	1
19 June 1993	1	Elemental	Tears for Fears	5	19 June 1993	1
26 June 1993	10	Emergency on Planet Earth	Jamiroquai	1	26 June 1993	3
26 June 1993	3	Unplugged	Neil Young	4	26 June 1993	1
3 July 1993	1	Gold Against the Soul	Manic Street Preachers	8	3 July 1993	1
3 July 1993	1	Muddy Water Blues: A Tribute to Muddy Waters	Paul Rodgers	9	3 July 1993	1
10 July 1993	3	Back to Broadway	Barbra Streisand	4	10 July 1993	1
17 July 1993	9	Zooropa	U2	1	17 July 1993	1
17 July 1993	12	Debut	Björk	3	17 July 1993	3
17 July 1993	6	Always	Michael Ball	3	24 July 1993	2
17 July 1993	8	Bigger, Better, Faster, More!	4 Non Blondes	4	7 August 1993	1
24 July 1993	11	Promises and Lies	UB40	1	24 July 1993	7
31 July 1993	1	Siamese Dream	The Smashing Pumpkins	4	31 July 1993	1
7 August 1993	1	Evolution	Oleta Adams	10	7 August 1993	1
14 August 1993	6	River of Dreams	Billy Joel	3	21 August 1993	1
28 August 1993	3	Antmusic: The Very Best of Adam Ant	Adam Ant	6	4 September 1993	1
4 September 1993	3	Levellers	Levellers	2	4 September 1993	1
11 September 1993	37	Music Box	Mariah Carey	1	11 September 1993	6
11 September 1993	1	Last Splash	The Breeders	5	11 September 1993	1
18 September 1993	23	Bat Out of Hell II: Back into Hell	Meat Loaf	1	18 September 1993	11
18 September 1993	3	Wild Wood	Paul Weller	2	18 September 1993	1
18 September 1993	1	Post Historic Monsters	Carter the Unstoppable Sex Machine	5	18 September 1993	1
25 September 1993	3	In Utero	Nirvana	1	25 September 1993	1
25 September 1993	1	The Hits/The B-Sides	Prince	4	25 September 1993	1
25 September 1993	4	The Hits 1	Prince	5	25 September 1993	1
25 September 1993	5	The Hits 2	Prince	5	9 October 1993	1
25 September 1993	3	Elements – The Best of Mike Oldfield	Mike Oldfield	5	2 October 1993	1
25 September 1993	1	Wait for Me	Kenny Thomas	10	2 October 1993	1
2 October 1993	2	1962-1966	The Beatles	3	2 October 1993	1
2 October 1993	2	1967-1970	The Beatles	4	2 October 1993	1
9 October 1993	3	Very	Pet Shop Boys	1	9 October 1993	1
9 October 1993	1	Laid	James	3	9 October 1993	1
9 October 1993	2	Love Scenes	Beverley Craven	4	9 October 1993	1
16 October 1993	17	Elegant Slumming	M People	2	16 October 1993	1
16 October 1993	1	Construction for the Modern Idiot	The Wonder Stuff	4	16 October 1993	1
16 October 1993	3	Aces and Kings – The Best of Go West	Go West	5	16 October 1993	1
16 October 1993	1	Retro Active	Def Leppard	6	16 October 1993	1
23 October 1993	15	Everything Changes	Take That	1	23 October 1993	2
23 October 1993	3	Vs.	Pearl Jam	2	23 October 1993	1
23 October 1993	3	Together Alone	Crowded House	4	23 October 1993	1
23 October 1993	3	Come on Feel the Lemonheads	The Lemonheads	5	23 October 1993	1
23 October 1993	1	Real	Belinda Carlisle	9	23 October 1993	1
30 October 1993	18	One Woman: The Ultimate Collection ♦	Diana Ross	1	1 January 1994	2
30 October 1993	2	Bang!... The Greatest Hits of Frankie Goes to Hollywood	Frankie Goes to Hollywood	4	30 October 1993	1
30 October 1993	4	Experience the Divine: Greatest Hits	Bette Midler	3	6 November 1993	1
30 October 1993	1	Find Your Way	Gabrielle	9	30 October 1993	1
6 November 1993	2	Duets	Frank Sinatra	5	6 November 1993	1
13 November 1993	2	The Red Shoes	Kate Bush	2	13 November 1993	1
13 November 1993	1	Full Moon, Dirty Hearts	INXS	3	13 November 1993	1
13 November 1993	1	Espresso Logic	Chris Rea	8	13 November 1993	1
13 November 1993	1	Greatest Hits	Tom Petty and the Heartbreakers	10	13 November 1993	1
20 November 1993	12	Both Sides	Phil Collins	1	20 November 1993	1
20 November 1993	13	So Far So Good ♦	Bryan Adams	1	15 January 1994	1
20 November 1993	22	End of Part One: Their Greatest Hits ♦	Wet Wet Wet	1	30 July 1994	5
20 November 1993	1	So Natural	Lisa Stansfield	6	20 November 1993	1
20 November 1993	1	The Singles Collection	David Bowie	9	20 November 1993	1
27 November 1993	6	The One Thing	Michael Bolton	4	27 November 1993	1
4 December 1993	2	"The Spaghetti Incident?"	Guns N' Roses	2	4 December 1993	1
4 December 1993	5	Duets	Elton John and Various artists	5	4 December 1993	2
4 December 1993	1	Volume IV The Classic Singles 88–93	Soul II Soul	10	4 December 1993	1

== See also ==
- 1993 in British music
- List of number-one albums from the 1990s (UK)
