= Drawn to the Deep End =

Studio album by Gene
- Released: 17 February 1997
- Genre: Indie rock, Britpop
- Length: 52:44
- Label: Polydor
- Producer: Christopher Merrick Hughes*

Gene chronology
To See the Lights (1996)	Drawn to the Deep End (1997)	Revelations (1999)

Drawn to the Deep End is the second studio album by English indie rock band Gene. It was released in February 1997. The album was reissued in double disc deluxe editions containing extra materials on 3 February 2014.

== Critical reception ==
Professional ratings
Review scores
Source	Rating
AllMusic	2.5/5 stars
NME	5/10
Wall of Sound	87/100

Jack Rabid of AllMusic called the album "a total, total knockout", adding "Drawn to the Deep End, as its title implies, is an emotional onslaught, a flood of raw, unfettered, and unfiltered human feeling, an exquisite ebb and flow of earthquakes and temporary serenity" and stating that it was an "early favorite for 1997's LP of the year."

== Track listing ==
All music is composed by Matt James, Steve Mason, Kevin Miles and Martin Rossiter, except where noted.

No.	Title	Length
1.	"New Amusements"	6:51
2.	"Fighting Fit"	3:55
3.	"Where Are They Now?"	4:15
4.	"Speak To Me Someone"	3:55
5.	"We Could Be Kings"	5:15
6.	"Why I Was Born"	6:00
7.	"Long Sleeves For The Summer"	3:31
8.	"Save Me, I'm Yours"	4:25
9.	"Voice Of The Father"	3:21
10.	"The Accidental"	3:02
11.	"I Love You, What Are You?"	4:42
12.	"Sub Rosa"	3:39
Total length:		52:44

== Personnel ==
- Martin Rossiter – vocals, piano
- Steve Mason – guitar
- Kevin Miles – bass
- Matt James – drums
