= Olympian (album) =

Studio album by Gene
- Released: 20 March 1995
- Recorded: Autumn 1994
- Studio: Townhouse 3, London
- Genre: Britpop, alternative rock
- Length: 40:31; 2:19:12 (2014 remastered & expanded reissue)
- Label: Polydor (US and Europe); Costermonger (UK)
- Producer: Phil Vinall, Miti Adhikari

Gene chronology
Olympian (1995)	To See the Lights (1996)

Olympian is the 1995 debut album by British rock band Gene, released on 20 March 1995 by Costermonger Records.

It is frequently recognized as one of the crowning achievements of Britpop.

The album sound is noted for being influenced by the Smiths, the Jam and the Small Faces.

The album reached number 8 in the UK albums chart].

The image used for the cover is a still from Ingmar Bergman's The Seventh Seal.

== Reception ==
Professional ratings
Review scores
Source	Rating
AllMusic	4.5/5 stars
Chicago Tribune	3/4 stars
God Is in the TV	5/5
The Guardian	4/4 stars
The Line of Best Fit	9/10
NME	5/10
Q	4/5 stars
Rolling Stone	3/5 stars
Spin	6/10
Vox	8/10

Stephen Thomas Erlewine of AllMusic said of the album: "While Gene manages to carve out an identity indebted to the Smiths but not dominated by them, they also fail to produce an album of consistently compelling material – considering that it's a debut album, that's not a fatal flaw. And Gene's best material shows they are capable of transcending their influences."

== Track listing ==
All tracks are written by Gene

No.	Title	Length
1.	"Haunted by You"	3:41
2.	"Your Love, It Lies"	3:18
3.	"Truth, Rest Your Head"	5:00
4.	"A Car That Sped"	3:36
5.	"Left-Handed"	2:20
6.	"London, Can You Wait?"	3:11
7.	"To the City"	4:00
8.	"Still Can't Find the Phone"	3:00
9.	"Sleep Well Tonight"	4:36
10.	"Olympian"	5:25
11.	"We'll Find Our Own Way"	2:24
Total length:		40:31

US Bonus Tracks
No.	Title	Length
12.	"For the Dead"	3:26
13.	"Be My Light, Be My Guide"	4:03
Total length:		48:02

== Personnel ==
Gene

- Martin Rossiter - Vocals, Keyboards
- Steve Mason - Guitar
- Kevin Miles - Bass
- Matt James - Drums

Additional musicians

Electra Strings:

- Sian Bell - Cello
- Jocelyn Pook - Viola
- Jules Singleton - 2nd Violin
- Sonia Slany - Lead Violin
- Pete Thomas - String Arrangements

Production

- Phil Vinall - Producer
- Pete Hofmann - Engineer
- Andy Vella - Design
- Kevin Westenberg, Melanie Cox and Andrew Carruth - Photography

== Certifications ==
Certifications for Olympian
Region	Certification	Certified units/sales
United Kingdom (BPI)	Silver	60,000^{^}
^{^} Shipments figures based on certification alone.
