= Martin Rossiter =

British singer

- Born: 15 May 1970 (age 56)
- Origin: Croxley Green, Hertfordshire, England
- Occupations: Singer, educator
- Instruments: Vocals, keyboards, piano
- Years active: 1994–present
- Member of: Gene
- Website: martinrossiter.bandcamp.com

Martin Rossiter (born 15 May 1970) is a British singer from Croxley Green, Hertfordshire, who was lead singer of the Britpop band Gene from 1993 through to their break up in 2004. He released a solo album in 2012.

== Career ==
Though Gene was labelled as a Britpop band, Rossiter was never happy being included in the genre saying, "It was played out under the dirty shadow of the union flag which I always found quite distasteful. I never had any desire to represent Great Britain. At the time I said that I regarded myself as European rather than British. I'm a Socialist and I've always felt very uncomfortable with the idea of nationalism because it can be a very dangerous thing." He recorded four albums with the band between 1995 and 2001, and performed live until 2004.

In addition to writing and recording as a solo artist, he is also a member of the band Call Me Jolene, which released the four-track May EP in 2013. He works as a music teacher for British and Irish Modern Music Institute, and artist development officer at Access to Music.

In 2011, Rossiter made his solo live debut in Brighton, where he performed new material, which was later released as Live at the Unitarian Church. His first solo album, The Defenestration of St Martin, was released on 3 December 2012 on the Drop Anchor Music label. He wrote most of the songs on piano over a five-year period and financed the record through crowd-funding. Rossiter embarked on a UK tour in support of the album. It was followed in 2014 by a live album accompanied by a DVD entitled Live at Bush Hall.

On 26 August 2019, Rossiter announced a farewell show with full band, performing a one-off career-closing set spanning all areas of Gene and his solo work. The show was originally scheduled to take place on 13 June 2020 at the Shepherd's Bush Empire, but it was repeatedly rescheduled as a result of the COVID-19 pandemic and eventually took place at the O2 Forum Kentish Town on 20 November 2021, after a one-off warm-up show at Concorde 2 in Brighton on 11 November 2021.

Rossiter came out of retirement to participate in a charity fundraising show for Ukrainian refugees. A Night For Ukraine had a bill of music acts and comedians and took place on 22 March 2022 at the Shepherd's Bush Empire.

In 2025 Rossiter was confirmed as taking part in his band's Gene reunion gigs.

== Personal life ==
Rossiter is bisexual. He lives in Brighton and has three children.
