= Gene (band) =

English alternative rock band

- Origin: London, England
- Genres: Alternative rock Britpop
- Years active: 1993 – 2004; 2008 (one-off reunion); 2025 – present
- Labels: Costermonger; Polydor; Contra
- Members: Martin Rossiter; Steve Mason; Matt James; Kevin Miles

Gene are an English rock band that rose to prominence in the mid-1990s. Formed in 1993, they were categorised by the UK music press as a Britpop band and often drew comparisons with the Smiths because of lead singer Martin Rossiter's similarities to Morrissey in demeanour, surname, lyrics and song titles. Gene's music was influenced by The Jam, The Smiths, The Style Council, Faces and The Clash. The band split in 2004 but got back together to play a series of gigs in 2025 and 2026.

== History ==
=== The Go Hole and Sp!n ===
Gene's origins lie in a previous band which was first called The Go Hole, named after a fictional "Beat" club in John Clellon Holmes' novel Go. They released the single "Flight of Angels" on Big Pop Records in 1987. They were later renamed to Sp!n when they became a four-piece. The band was formed in 1987 by Lee Clark (vocals/guitar) and Darryl James Walton (Daz) (bass). However, their collaboration was short-lived as Walton was soon replaced by John Mason on bass, with Matt James (Wrigley) joining soon afterwards on drums. Walton would then take on the role of band manager, booking shows across London, using his connections. Their first single, recorded in the same studios as The Ruts' "In a Rut", appeared on Walton's own Big Pop Record label. A John Peel session fuelled their early success, where they mixed with the music and artistic community in Camberwell mingling with members of The House of Love, My White Bedroom, and Vic Reeves and Bob Mortimer. Walton would continue to organise and negotiate the group's gigs, contracts and press when they were a four-piece. After 18 months, Clark, Mason and James invited John's brother Steve Mason to play lead/rhythm guitar and thereby freeing Clark to focus on vocals.

Two singles, "Scratches (In the Sand)" and "Let's Pretend" were released in 1990 and 1991 respectively as an album had been recorded with Stephen Street as producer.

Then, Sp!n were involved in a car accident. John Mason suffered a head injury and went into an 11-day coma. Walton was also hurt. The day prior to the accident, Clark had offered his resignation in a letter to the rest of the band, due to his dissatisfaction with the way that Walton was guiding its course. "The final straw for me," stated Clark, "was calling the Sp!n album In Motion - a play on word-association which was so naff, that it beggared belief." A further EP, titled Hot Blood, was released in late 1991. The music press ceased to portray the band as new and vibrant, instead substituting headlines of car crashes and injuries, necessitating an overhaul of the band.

John Mason, disappointed with the music business, went on to become a writer. Clark briefly recorded demos with Andrew "Snake" Newton, who had been the live sound engineer for Sp!n, then gave up music to become a primary school teacher. Clark felt he was increasingly too old to become a rock star and decided to play and record in his own bedroom and indeed returned to this after a hiatus of about ten years.

Wanting to continue together in a band, Steve Mason and James recruited bass player Kevin Miles, who had a long association with the band. After seeing Watford native Martin Rossiter cross the floor of a club, Mason approached him and they began to talk. Their meeting ended with Rossiter handing out his business card and Mason asking Rossiter if he would like to audition with the band. Rossiter appeared on Sp!n's last demos as "Martin T. Falls" (a nod to the Mancunian band The Fall) shortly before the band decided to adopt the name Gene.

=== Breakthrough ===
By the time NME ... journalists Keith Cameron and Roy Wilkinson encountered Gene, the band had already gained some live experience and had written several songs. Cameron and Wilkinson were impressed enough to form an independent record label called Costermonger with the sole purpose of promoting Gene to a wider audience. Their double A-sided debut single "For The Dead" / "Child's Body" was released on Costermonger in May 1994. The single received a great deal of attention from the music press: Select named it "Single Of The Month", whilst NME made it their "Single of the Week".

The limited edition of 1,994 copies sold out in two days. Numerous live shows followed. Gene's performance in support of Pulp at London's The Forum was hailed by the NME as a breakthrough performance.

With Gene already developing a devoted fan following, a new single was planned to consolidate their popularity. The second single, a triple A-side consisting of "Be My Light Be My Guide", "This Is Not My Crime" and "I Can't Help Myself" was released on 1 August 1994 via Costermonger. Melody Maker awarded "Be My Light Be My Guide" its "Single Of The Week".

=== Popular success ===
After achieving the top spot in the UK indie chart and number 54 in the UK Singles Chart, the band played their first UK headlining tour, that included a show at London's Paradise Club which sold out immediately, with 800 people in the venue. The plaudits had not gone unnoticed by the big record companies and Gene eventually signed a deal with Polydor Records. After a live appearance at the Reading Festival, the band released their third single "Sleep Well Tonight", just prior to embarking on a large national tour, preceded by several sold-out French dates.

Featuring strongly in both critics and readers end of year polls, Gene were the recipients of the inaugural NME Brat Award for 'Best New Act', and as such played at the sold-out Brat Award ceremony at the London Astoria. They adorned the covers of both the NME and Melody Maker, who voted them their 'Brightest Hope' for 1995. Their fourth single, "Haunted By You", became the band's second Top 40 hit (reaching number 32), whilst their debut LP Olympian reached number 8 in the UK Albums Chart following a plethora of excellent reviews. The album also gained Gene their first silver disc, recording sales of over 70,000 in the UK alone, and when the final single from the album was released ("Olympian"), it went into the Top 20 of the UK Singles Chart.

The summer and autumn of 1995 were spent touring the world, including a well-received performance at Glastonbury Festival, headlining Reading Festival, a tour of Japan and Europe and then a foray into the US. With Christmas looming, the band entered the studio again for pre-production on their new album, scheduled for release the following year. 1996 began with a remixed "For the Dead" which subsequently became Gene's biggest hit (peaking at number 14 in the Top 40), leading to their debut appearance on Top of the Pops. To See The Lights, an LP of rarities, live tracks, radio sessions and acoustic versions of singles, was released in January and reached the number 11 spot in the album chart. A national tour was undertaken during most of the same month, culminating in two sell-out London shows at Shepherd's Bush Empire and the Astoria.

In anticipation of their second studio LP, October 1996 saw the release of "Fighting Fit", an up-tempo rock song which reached number 22. The start of 1997 heralded the release of "We Could Be Kings", another epic rock song which again proved to be popular, reaching number 18. The LP Drawn to The Deep End (1997), takes its name from a "Fighting Fit" B-side, and it revealed a lavish production replete with strings, far more prominent guitar solos from Mason, and a rather warbling vocal affectation from Rossiter. The album showed some measure of musical development from the band, which was reflected by the inclusion of a keyboardist in their live shows (Grand Drive's Julian Wilson [1996-98, 2004], former Style Council keyboardist Mick Talbot [1999-2001], Marcus Brown [2001], and Angie Pollack [2003-2004]), and the fact that Rossiter was starting to master the art of singing live whilst playing the keyboard for some songs. Lyrically speaking, the dominating themes of the album were loneliness and deep yearning. Indeed, Rossiter was in the depths of depression during the making of the album and the songs resulting from this period remain some of the band's most powerful work. Drawn to the Deep End was another critical success, with Q magazine awarding it four stars. Like its predecessor, the album entered the top 10 of the album charts, and subsequent singles, "Where Are They Now?" and "Speak to Me Someone" both made the top 40, at 22 and 30 respectively.

Arguably the defining moment of the band's career came in March 1997, when they played with a full orchestra to a sell-out audience at the Royal Albert Hall. Transmitted on Radio 1, the event was commemorated by the release of two live EPs in tandem with the last two singles from Drawn to the Deep End. They also played in Hong Kong that year as part of the festivities of the UK's ceding the island back into Chinese hands.

By late 1997, Rossiter in particular had gained some press attention in his newfound status as a minor celebrity. He had already appeared as a guest on Never Mind the Buzzcocks and various articles speculated on his sexuality (much to Rossiter's bemusement. As he told Sorted magazine: "I've never hidden the fact that I've slept on both sides of the bed and people find that very odd that I was quite happy to say 'yeah, I'm bisexual and it doesn't really matter.") He also hit the headlines due to a war of words between Rossiter and comedian Paul Kaye which culminated in Rossiter headbutting Kaye in a nightclub.

=== Revelations and leaving Polydor ===
1998 served as a fallow year for the band, used for writing new material as well as a few low-key shows and events such as Radio 1's Sound City. In fact, the most newsworthy article about Gene during that year was of Martin Rossiter's 'drastic' change in image. Gone were the suit jackets with white shirts and the floppy side-parted hair, in favour of the mod-like Fred Perry polo shirts, jeans and a very short haircut. The new look was to be reflective of the band's rockier forthcoming studio LP, Revelations. On their return from relative wilderness, it appeared that Gene had lost a lot of their prestige during their year out of the limelight and were no longer the golden boys of the indie scene. First off, the LP, released in February 1999, was a Jam-like political single called "As Good As It Gets", which entered the charts at number 23 to lukewarm reviews. Revelations was released that March to very mixed reviews; the NME awarded it 5/10, concluding that the album was "pretty thin on the ground".

Revelations carries some political songs, such as the aforementioned "As Good As It Gets", "The British Disease" and "Mayday". Rossiter, who had an occasional political spot on BBC Radio 5 Live, launched a vitriolic critique of New Labour's first term in office. The album charted disappointingly at number 23, and the second single from the album, "Fill Her Up", charted at number 37 that April. Despite a successful and comprehensive tour around the country, again selling out many venues, as well as making a successful appearance at the Reading Festival of that year, Gene and Polydor parted ways. The band felt somewhat undermined by their label's lack of support and failure to market the album adequately. As Rossiter explained: "Only when we got to Gretna Green did we realize that Polydor had disembarked at Crewe." Whilst the band made the best of Revelations' raw, live sound during the album's promotion, as well as the fact that the recording of the album took less than a month to complete (the marketing literature said it was in order to best convey the energy apparent from their live shows), after the split they claimed that they could have made it a better album had they been given more time by their label.

=== Artistic freedom and Libertine ===
Despite the lack of the support of a major record label, Gene spent a good portion of 2000 touring the world, which climaxed in a sell-out tour of the US. One of their shows, at the Los Angeles venue Troubadour, was broadcast over the internet in what was then a record-breaking webcast, screened to at least 60,000 people worldwide. Only two months after the recording of that show, Gene released Rising for Sunset, a live album recorded from that Troubadour show. The webcast and album were promoted with a pioneering international internet-only campaign resulting in 40k units sold upon its universal release. As well as rehearsing the band's hits, they released two new tracks, "Rising For Sunset" and "Somewhere in the World"; promising songs that bode well for their next studio LP and marking a return to the romance of their more popular tracks.

That album, entitled Libertine, was released in October 2001 on Gene's own label, 'Sub Rosa Records'.

=== Split ===
Despite further successful live shows in subsequent years including a set at the Morrissey-curated Royal Festival Hall Meltdown Festival in June 2004, Gene opted for an amicable split later that year. Gene's last live performance was on 16 December 2004 at the London Astoria.

The band members have all continued to work in music. Roy Wilkinson went on to manage the band then known as British Sea Power, while Snake Newton went on to mix an assortment of acts including Duran Duran, Sugababes, Pet Shop Boys and Snow Patrol.

In the third week of January 2008, all four members of Gene briefly took to the stage again for their ex-manager Jerry Smith's 50th birthday party. They performed five songs at the 100 Club in London: "Be My Light, Be My Guide", "For The Dead", "Where Are They Now?", "London, Can You Wait?" and "Olympian".

=== Reissues ===
In January 2014, all four studio albums plus To See the Lights were reissued in double disc deluxe editions containing extra materials (demos, out-takes, radio versions and live). Drummer Matt James discussed the re-releases and the history of the band with UK music website The Mouth Magazine.

In 2020 a box-set Gene: The Albums was released, compiling the previous 2014 re-issues plus live album Rising For Sunset into a single 8-disc or 9-CD package. An abridged double album entitled Yours For The Taking - the best of Gene was released simultaneously, at a more accessible price point.

=== Reunion ===
On 17 January 2025 the company Gene Touring Limited was registered with Companies House, listing all four band members as directors. An "official" Facebook page was then created for the band, with teaser content hinting at a London-based event to mark the 30th anniversary of debut album Olympian.

On 20 March 2025 the band announced a one-off gig to mark the anniversary, which took place on 4 October 2025 at the Eventim Apollo, Hammersmith, London.

The band announced a warmup gigs for their London reunion show at the Brudenell Social Club in Leeds on Sunday 28 September

A second warm up gig in Sheffield on Thursday 2 October 2025 was also announced.

Following high demand for their reunion shows, Gene announced a short tour for March 2026, with shows in Nottingham, Glasgow, Bristol, Dublin and Manchester.

The band played two nights at The Roundhouse, London on 9 and 10 October 2026.

== Members ==
- Martin Rossiter - vocals, keyboards, piano
- Steve Mason - guitar
- Kevin Miles - bass
- Matt James - drums, percussion, occasional backing vocals, acoustic guitar

== Tour members ==
- Julian Wilson - keyboards, organ, piano (1996-1998, 2004)
- Mick Talbot - keyboards, organ, piano (1999-2001, 2025/2026)
- Marcus Brown - keyboards, organ, piano (2001)
- Angie Pollock - keyboards, organ, piano (2001-2002, 2004)

== Discography ==
=== Studio albums ===
- 1995 Olympian - UK No. 8
- 1997 Drawn to the Deep End - No. 8
- 1999 Revelations - No. 25
- 2001 Libertine - No. 92

=== Live album ===
- 2000 Rising for Sunset - No. 118
- 2026 Apollo

=== Compilation albums ===
- 1996 To See the Lights - No. 11
- 2001 As Good As It Gets: The Best Of
- 2006 The Collection
- 2006 The John Peel Sessions
- 2020 Gene: The Albums
- 2020 Yours For The Taking - the best of Gene

=== Singles ===
- 1994 "For the Dead" / "Child's Body" UK - No. 86
- 1994 "Be My Light, Be My Guide" / "This Is Not My Crime" / "I Can't Help Myself" - No. 54
- 1994 "Sleep Well Tonight" / "Sick, Sober And Sorry" / "Her Fifteen Years" - No. 36
- 1995 "Haunted by You" / "Do You Want To Hear It From Me" / "How Much For Love" - No. 32
- 1995 "Be My Light, Be My Guide" / "I Can't Help Myself"
- 1995 "Olympian" / "I Can't Decide If She Really Loves Me" / "To See The Lights" - No. 18
- 1995 "Still Can't Find the Phone" / "I Can't Decide If She Really Loves Me" / "Don't Let Me Down" (Germany)
- 1996 "For the Dead" / "Child's Body" / "Sick, Sober & Sorry (Live - Helter Skelter 6/7/95)" (re-issue) - No. 14
- 1996 "Fighting Fit" / "Drawn To The Deep End" / "Autumn Stone" - No. 22
- 1997 "We Could Be Kings" / "Dolce & Gabbana Or Nowt" / "Wasteland" - No. 17
- 1997 "Where Are They Now?" / "Cast Out In The Seventies" / "Nightswimming" - No. 22
- 1997 "Speak to Me Someone" / "As The Bruises Fade" / "The Ship Song" - No. 30
- 1999 "As Good As It Gets" / "Toasting The Union" / "Man On Earth" - No. 23
- 1999 "Fill Her Up" / "Pass On To Me" / " Touched By The Hand Of Havoc " - No. 36
- 2001 "Is It Over?" / "Supermarket Bombscare" / "Little Diamond" / "Who Said This Was The End?" - did not chart
- 2001 "Does He Have a Name?" / "From Georgia To Osaka" / "Welcome To Dover" / "With Love In Mind" / "Does He Have A Name?" (promo)
- 2004 "Let Me Move On" / "Is It Over?" / "With Love In Mind" / "If I'm A Friend" - No. 69
